= 2002 California State Board of Equalization election =

2002 California State Board of Equalization elections
- November 5, 2002

All 4 seats on the California State Board of Equalization
	Majority party	Minority party
Party	Democratic	Republican
Last election	2	2
Seats before	2	2
Seats won	2	2
Seat change	Steady	Steady
Popular vote	3,457,322	3,156,420
Percentage	50.2%	45.9%

The 2002 California State Board of Equalization elections took place on November 5, 2002, to elect all four seats of the State Board of Equalization, with the primary election taking place on March 5, 2002.

== Overview ==
California State Board of Equalization general election, 2002
Party	Candidates	Votes		Seats			
Party	Candidates	No.	%	Before	After	+/–	%
Democratic Party	4	3,457,322	50.2%	2	2	Steady	50.0%
Republican Party	4	3,156,420	45.9%	2	2	Steady	50.0%
Libertarian Party	3	267,351	3.9%	0	0	Steady	0.0%
Total	11	6,881,093	100.0%	4	4	Steady	100.0%

Popular vote
Democratic	50.2%
Republican	45.9%
Libertarian	3.9%

Board of Equalization seats
Democratic	50.0%
Republican	50.0%

Board of Equalization District	Incumbent	Party	Elected officeholder	Party
1st	Johan Klehs	Democratic	Carole Migden	Democratic
2nd	Dean Andal	Republican	Bill Leonard	Republican
3rd	Claude Parrish	Republican	Claude Parrish	Republican
4th	John Chiang	Democratic	John Chiang	Democratic

== District 1 ==
The incumbent was Democrat Johan Klehs, who was elected in 1994 and 1998. He was ineligible for reelection.

=== Primary election ===
==== Results ====
2002 California State Board of Equalization District 1 Democratic primary
Party	Candidate	Votes	%
Democratic	Carole Migden	604,270	100.0
Total votes		604,270	100.0
Invalid or blank votes		158,181	20.7

2002 California State Board of Equalization District 1 Republican primary
Party	Candidate	Votes	%
Republican	Mark S. Bendick	211,448	56.2
Republican	Max Woods	165,401	43.8
Total votes		376,849	100.0
Invalid or blank votes		136,046	26.5

2002 California State Board of Equalization District 1 Libertarian primary
Party	Candidate	Votes	%
Libertarian	Elizabeth C. Brierly	6,304	100.0
Total votes		6,304	100.0
Invalid or blank votes		40,107	88.7

=== General election ===
==== Candidates ====
- Mark S. Bendick (R), business tax manager
- Carole Migden (D), member of the California State Assembly (1996-2002)
- Elizabeth C. Brierly (L), business analyst

==== Results ====
California's 1st Board of Equalization district, 2002
Party	Candidate	Votes	%
Democratic	Carole Migden	1,205,726	60.7
Republican	Mark S. Bendick	667,536	33.6
Libertarian	Elizabeth C. Brierly	114,962	5.7
Total votes		1,988,224	100.0
Democratic hold			

== District 2 ==
The incumbent was Republican Dean Andal, who was elected in 1994 and 1998. He was ineligible for reelection.

=== Primary election ===
==== Results ====
2002 California State Board of Equalization District 2 Democratic primary
Party	Candidate	Votes	%
Democratic	Tom Y. Santos	238,467	54.7
Democratic	Norman R. Angelo	197,959	45.3
Total votes		436,426	100.0
Invalid or blank votes		197,959	24.6

2002 California State Board of Equalization District 2 Republican primary
Party	Candidate	Votes	%
Republican	Bill Leonard	370,839	60.0
Republican	Edward J. "Ted" Costa	247,260	40.0
Total votes		618,099	100.0
Invalid or blank votes		138,904	18.3

=== General election ===
==== Candidates ====
- Bill Leonard (R), member of the California State Assembly (1978-1988, 1996-2002) and a member of the California State Senate (1996-2002)
- Tom Y. Santos (D), tax consultant/realtor

==== Results ====
California's 2nd Board of Equalization district, 2002
Party	Candidate	Votes	%
Republican	Bill Leonard	1,057,953	58.7
Democratic	Tom Y. Santos	746,019	41.3
Total votes		1,803,972	100.0
Republican hold			

== District 3 ==
The incumbent was Republican Claude Parrish, who was elected in 1998 with 53.1% of the vote. He was running for reelection.

=== Primary election ===
==== Results ====
2002 California State Board of Equalization District 3 Democratic primary
Party	Candidate	Votes	%
Democratic	Mary Christian-Heising	309,587	100.0
Total votes		309,587	100.0
Invalid or blank votes		94,354	23.4

2002 California State Board of Equalization District 3 Republican primary
Party	Candidate	Votes	%
Republican	Claude Parrish (incumbent)	363,442	64.0
Republican	Steve Petruzzo	161,355	28.4
Republican	Emad Bakeer	43,343	7.6
Total votes		568,140	100.0
Invalid or blank votes		91,564	13.9

2002 California State Board of Equalization District 3 Libertarian primary
Party	Candidate	Votes	%
Libertarian	J.R. Graham	5,577	100.0
Total votes		5,577	100.0
Invalid or blank votes		1,041	15.7

=== General election ===
==== Candidates ====
- Mary Christian-Heising (D), businesswoman/educator/journalist
- J.R. Graham (L), author/security officer
- Claude Parrish (R), incumbent member of the Board of Equalization

==== Results ====
California's 3rd Board of Equalization district, 2002
Party	Candidate	Votes	%
Republican	Claude Parrish (incumbent)	1,020,619	59.1
Democratic	Mary Christian-Heising	642,208	37.1
Libertarian	J.R. Graham	66,955	3.8
Total votes		1,729,782	100.0
Republican hold			

== District 4 ==
The incumbent was Democrat John Chiang, who was elected in 1998 for 60.2% of the vote. He was running for reelection.

=== Primary election ===
==== Results ====
2002 California State Board of Equalization District 4 Democratic primary
Party	Candidate	Votes	%
Democratic	John Chiang (incumbent)	387,460	100.0
Total votes		387,460	100.0
Invalid or blank votes		158,376	29.0

2002 California State Board of Equalization District 4 Republican primary
Party	Candidate	Votes	%
Republican	Glen Forsch	217,306	100.0
Total votes		217,306	100.0
Invalid or blank votes		103,662	32.3

2002 California State Board of Equalization District 4 Libertarian primary
Party	Candidate	Votes	%
Libertarian	Kenneth A. Weissman	2,726	100.0
Total votes		2,726	100.0
Invalid or blank votes		1,526	35.9

=== General election ===
==== Candidates ====
- John Chiang (D), incumbent member of the Board of Equalization
- Glen Forsch (R), businessman
- Kenneth A. Weissman (L), attorney

==== Results ====
California's 4th Board of Equalization district, 2002
Party	Candidate	Votes	%
Democratic	John Chiang (incumbent)	863,369	63.6
Republican	Glen Forsch	410,312	30.2
Libertarian	Kenneth A. Weissman	85,434	6.2
Total votes		1,359,115	100.0
Democratic hold			
