= 2006 California State Board of Equalization election =

2006 California State Board of Equalization elections
- November 7, 2006

All 4 seats on the California State Board of Equalization
	Majority party	Minority party
Party	Democratic	Republican
Last election	2	2
Seats before	2	2
Seats won	2	2
Seat change	Steady	Steady
Popular vote	4,101,849	3,414,117
Percentage	51.3%	42.7%

The 2006 California State Board of Equalization elections took place on November 7, 2006, to elect all four seats of the State Board of Equalization, with the primary election taking place on June 6, 2006.

== Overview ==
California State Board of Equalization general election, 2006
Party	Candidates	Votes		Seats			
Party	Candidates	No.	%	Before	After	+/–	%
Democratic Party	4	4,101,849	51.3%	2	2	Steady	50.0%
Republican Party	4	3,414,117	42.7%	2	2	Steady	50.0%
Peace and Freedom Party	4	276,610	3.5%	0	0	Steady	0.0%
Libertarian Party	3	199,306	2.5%	0	0	Steady	0.0%
Total	15	7,991,882	100.0%	4	4	Steady	100.0%

Popular vote
Democratic	51.3%
Republican	42.7%
Peace and Freedom	3.5%
Libertarian	2.5%

Board of Equalization seats
Democratic	50.0%
Republican	50.0%

Board of Equalization District	Incumbent	Party	Elected officeholder	Party
1st	Betty Yee	Democratic	Betty Yee	Democratic
2nd	Bill Leonard	Republican	Bill Leonard	Republican
3rd	Claude Parrish	Republican	Michelle Steel	Republican
4th	John Chiang	Democratic	Judy Chu	Democratic

== District 1 ==
The incumbent was Democrat Betty Yee, who was appointed to finish the term of Carole Migden. She was running for reelection.

=== Primary election ===
==== Results ====
2006 California State Board of Equalization District 1 Democratic primary
Party	Candidate	Votes	%
Democratic	Betty Yee (incumbent)	729,992	100.0
Total votes		729,992	100.0

2006 California State Board of Equalization District 1 Republican primary
Party	Candidate	Votes	%
Republican	David J. Neighbors	332,218	100.0
Total votes		332,218	100.0

2006 California State Board of Equalization District 1 Libertarian primary
Party	Candidate	Votes	%
Libertarian	Kennita Watson	5,841	100.0
Total votes		5,841	100.0

2006 California State Board of Equalization District 1 Peace and Freedom primary
Party	Candidate	Votes	%
Peace and Freedom	David Campbell	1,508	100.0
Total votes		1,508	100.0

=== General election ===
==== Candidates ====
- David Campbell (P&F), office worker
- David J. Neighbors (R), CPA
- Kennita Watson (L), retired engineer
- Betty Yee (D), incumbent member of the Board of Equalization

==== Results ====
California's 1st Board of Equalization district, 2006
Party	Candidate	Votes	%
Democratic	Betty Yee (incumbent)	1,508,130	65.0
Republican	David J. Neighbors	677,942	29.2
Libertarian	Kennita Watson	68,405	2.9
Peace and Freedom	David Campbell	67,697	2.9
Total votes		2,322,174	100.0
Democratic hold			

== District 2 ==
The incumbent was Republican Bill Leonard, who was elected in 2002 with 58.7% of the vote. Leonard was running for reelection.

=== Primary election ===
==== Results ====
2006 California State Board of Equalization District 2 Democratic primary
Party	Candidate	Votes	%
Democratic	Tim Raboy	286,188	67.3
Democratic	Tom Bright	139,566	32.7
Total votes		425,754	100.0

2006 California State Board of Equalization District 2 Republican primary
Party	Candidate	Votes	%
Republican	Bill Leonard (incumbent)	353,710	67.6
Republican	Ed Streichman	170,154	32.4
Total votes		523,864	100.0

2006 California State Board of Equalization District 2 Libertarian primary
Party	Candidate	Votes	%
Libertarian	Willard Del Michlin	3,989	100.0
Total votes		3,989	100.0

2006 California State Board of Equalization District 2 Peace and Freedom primary
Party	Candidate	Votes	%
Peace and Freedom	Richard R. Perry	866	100.0
Total votes		866	100.0

=== General election ===
==== Candidates ====
- Bill Leonard (R), incumbent member of the Board of Equalization
- Willard Del Michlin (L), financial consultant
- Richard R. Perry (P&F), gardener
- Tim Raboy (D), investigator

==== Results ====
California's 2nd Board of Equalization district, 2006
Party	Candidate	Votes	%
Republican	Bill Leonard (incumbent)	1,155,308	55.8
Democratic	Tim Raboy	783,829	37.9
Peace and Freedom	Richard R. Perry	75,419	3.6
Libertarian	Willard Del Michlin	57,823	2.7
Total votes		2,072,379	100.0
Republican hold			

== District 3 ==
The incumbent was Republican Claude Parrish, who was elected in 1998 and 2002. Due to term limits, he was ineligible for reelection.

=== Primary election ===
==== Results ====
2006 California State Board of Equalization District 3 Democratic primary
Party	Candidate	Votes	%
Democratic	Mary Christian-Heising	366,004	100.0
Total votes		366,004	100.0

2006 California State Board of Equalization District 3 Republican primary
Party	Candidate	Votes	%
Republican	Michelle Steel	206,546	37.8
Republican	Ray Haynes	184,417	33.7
Republican	Steve Petruzzo	89,497	16.3
Republican	Hal "Jimbo" Styles	38,532	7.0
Republican	Lewis A. Da Silva	28,643	5.2
Total votes		547,635	100.0

2006 California State Board of Equalization District 3 Peace and Freedom primary
Party	Candidate	Votes	%
Peace and Freedom	Mary Lou Finley	803	100.0
Total votes		803	100.0

=== General election ===
==== Candidates ====
- Mary Lou Finley (P&F), teacher
- Mary Christian-Heising (D), businesswoman/educator/journalist
- Michelle Steel (R), Equalization Boardmember's Deputy

Steel's ballot designation of "Equalization Boardmember's Deputy" was controversial. According to a Los Angeles Times investigation, Marcus Frishman had served as deputy to incumbent boardmember Claude Parrish for eight years. On December 30, 2005, Parrish demoted Frishman, cutting his pay by 31%, and hiring Steel to fill in as the deputy. Steel resigned on March 31, 2006, and Frishman was rehired as Parrish's deputy the day after (with a 1% higher salary than his pre-demotion salary). During the three months that Frishman was demoted, he also worked on Steel's campaign for an undisclosed amount. One of Steel's primary opponent accused Steel of orchestrating the scheme in order to appear like she has more experience with the position that she was seeking than she actually had.

==== Results ====
California's 3rd Board of Equalization district, 2006
Party	Candidate	Votes	%
Republican	Michelle Steel	1,147,514	57.0
Democratic	Mary Christian-Heising	774,499	38.5
Peace and Freedom	Mary Lou Finley	91,467	4.5
Total votes		2,013,480	100.0
Republican hold			

== District 4 ==
The incumbent was Democrat John Chiang, who was elected in 1998 and 2002. He was ineligible for reelection.

=== Primary election ===
==== Results ====
2006 California State Board of Equalization District 4 Democratic primary
Party	Candidate	Votes	%
Democratic	Judy Chu	243,428	49.7
Democratic	Jerome Horton	154,536	31.5
Democratic	Rita Rogers	60,621	12.3
Democratic	Vonny T. Abbott	32,020	6.5
Total votes		490,605	100.0

2006 California State Board of Equalization District 4 Republican primary
Party	Candidate	Votes	%
Republican	Glen Forsch	80,459	43.3
Republican	John Y. Wong	79,421	42.7
Republican	Sam Song Yong Park	26,099	14.0
Total votes		185,979	100.0

2006 California State Board of Equalization District 4 Libertarian primary
Party	Candidate	Votes	%
Libertarian	Monica W. Kadera	2,168	100.0
Total votes		2,168	100.0

2006 California State Board of Equalization District 4 Peace and Freedom primary
Party	Candidate	Votes	%
Peace and Freedom	Cindy Varela Henderson	740	100.0
Total votes		740	100.0

=== General election ===
==== Candidates ====
- Judy Chu (D), member of the California State Assembly (2001-2006)
- Glen Forsch (R), businessman
- Cindy Varela Henderson (P&F), telephone technician
- Monica W. Kadera (L), CPA

==== Results ====
California's 4th Board of Equalization district, 2006
Party	Candidate	Votes	%
Democratic	Judy Chu	1,035,391	65.4
Republican	Glen Forsch	433,353	27.4
Libertarian	Monica W. Kadera	73,078	4.6
Peace and Freedom	Cindy Varela Henderson	42,027	2.6
Total votes		1,583,849	100.0
Democratic hold			
