= 1998 California State Board of Equalization election =

State election in California

1998 California State Board of Equalization elections
- November 3, 1998

All 4 seats on the California State Board of Equalization
	Majority party	Minority party	Third party
Party	Democratic	Republican	Libertarian
Last election	2	2	0
Seats before	2	2	0
Seats won	2	2	0
Seat change	Steady	Steady	Steady
Popular vote	3,974,343	2,507,252	509,288
Percentage	55.8%	35.2%	7.1%

The 1998 California State Board of Equalization elections took place on November 3, 1998, to elect all four seats of the State Board of Equalization, with the primary election taking place on June 2, 1998.

== Overview ==
California State Board of Equalization general election, 1998
Party	Candidates	Votes		Seats			
Party	Candidates	No.	%	Before	After	+/–	%
Democratic Party	4	3,974,343	55.8%	2	2	Steady	50.0%
Republican Party	3	2,507,252	35.2%	2	2	Steady	50.0%
Libertarian Party	3	509,288	7.1%	0	0	Steady	0.0%
Peace and Freedom Party	2	75,012	1.1%	0	0	Steady	0.0%
Green Party	1	58,480	0.8%	0	0	Steady	0.0%
Total	13	7,124,375	100.0%	4	4	Steady	100.0%

Popular vote
Democratic	55.8%
Republican	35.2%
Libertarian	7.1%
Peace and Freedom	1.1%
Green	0.8%

Board of Equalization seats
Democratic	50.0%
Republican	50.0%

Board of Equalization District	Incumbent	Party	Elected officeholder	Party
1st	Johan Klehs	Democratic	Johan Klehs	Democratic
2nd	Dean Andal	Republican	Dean Andal	Republican
3rd	Ernest J. Dronenburg, Jr.	Republican	Claude Parrish	Republican
4th	John Chiang	Democratic	John Chiang	Democratic

== District 1 ==
The incumbent was Democrat Johan Klehs, who was elected in 1994 with 51.5% of the vote. He was running for reelection.

=== Primary election ===
==== Results ====
1998 California State Board of Equalization District 1 Democratic primary
Party	Candidate	Votes	%
Democratic	Johan Klehs (incumbent)	965,504	100.0
Total votes		965,504	100.0

1998 California State Board of Equalization District 1 Libertarian primary
Party	Candidate	Votes	%
Libertarian	Kennita Watson	277,398	100.0
Total votes		277,398	100.0

=== General election ===
==== Candidates ====
- Johan Klehs (D), incumbent member of the Board of Equalization
- Kennita Watson (L)

==== Results ====
California's 1st Board of Equalization district, 1998
Party	Candidate	Votes	%
Democratic	Johan Klehs (incumbent)	1,440,370	78.4
Libertarian	Kennita Watson	396,346	21.6
Total votes		1,836,716	100.0
Invalid or blank votes		665,707	26.6
Democratic hold			

== District 2 ==
The incumbent was Republican Dean Andal, who was elected in 1994 with 54.1% of the vote. He was running for reelection.

=== Primary election ===
==== Results ====
1998 California State Board of Equalization District 2 Democratic primary
Party	Candidate	Votes	%
Democratic	Tom Y. Santos	295,718	50.2
Democratic	Joseph F. Micallef	293,777	49.8
Total votes		589,495	100.0

1998 California State Board of Equalization District 2 Republican primary
Party	Candidate	Votes	%
Republican	Dean Andal (incumbent)	745,686	100.0
Total votes		745,686	100.0

=== General election ===
==== Candidates ====
- Dean Andal (R), incumbent member of the Board of Equalization
- Tom Y. Santos (D)

==== Results ====
California's 2nd Board of Equalization district, 1998
Party	Candidate	Votes	%
Republican	Dean Andal (incumbent)	1,041,933	55.2
Democratic	Tom Y. Santos	845,533	44.8
Total votes		1,887,466	100.0
Invalid or blank votes		377,911	16.7
Republican hold			

== District 3 ==
The incumbent was Republican Ernest J. Dronenburg, Jr., who was elected in 1986, 1990, and 1994. He was ineligible for reelection.

=== Primary election ===
==== Results ====
1998 California State Board of Equalization District 3 Democratic primary
Party	Candidate	Votes	%
Democratic	Mary Christian-Heising	196,710	44.5
Democratic	Mark A. Spiegler	171,270	38.8
Democratic	Fred Clayton	73,645	16.7
Total votes		441,625	100.0

1998 California State Board of Equalization District 3 Republican primary
Party	Candidate	Votes	%
Republican	Claude Parrish	246,965	33.1
Republican	Craig A. Wilson	237,724	31.9
Republican	Patrick James Leone	91,279	12.2
Republican	Andy Schooler	71,404	9.6
Republican	Hal J. Styles, Jr.	50,900	6.8
Republican	Jim Stieringer	47,231	6.3
Total votes		745,503	100.0

1998 California State Board of Equalization District 3 Libertarian primary
Party	Candidate	Votes	%
Libertarian	J.R. Graham	37,677	100.0
Total votes		37,677	100.0

1998 California State Board of Equalization District 3 Peace and Freedom primary
Party	Candidate	Votes	%
Peace and Freedom	Maxine Bell Quirk	15,479	100.0
Total votes		15,479	100.0

=== General election ===
==== Candidates ====
- Mary Christian-Heising (D)
- J.R. Graham (L)
- Claude Parrish (R)
- Maxine Bell Quirk (P&F)

==== Results ====
California's 3rd Board of Equalization district, 1998
Party	Candidate	Votes	%
Republican	Claude Parrish	1,028,148	53.1
Democratic	Mary Christian-Heising	806,716	41.7
Libertarian	J.R. Graham	71,428	3.7
Peace and Freedom	Maxine Bell Quirk	29,908	1.5
Total votes		1,936,200	100.0
Invalid or blank votes		194,842	9.1
Republican hold			

== District 4 ==
The incumbent was Democrat John Chiang, who was appointed in 1997 to finish the term of Brad Sherman, who resigned following his election to the U.S. House of Representatives. Chiang was running for reelection.

=== Primary election ===
==== Results ====
1998 California State Board of Equalization District 4 Democratic primary
Party	Candidate	Votes	%
Democratic	John Chiang	217,715	34.6
Democratic	Jose Fernandez	150,020	23.8
Democratic	Tyrone I. Vahedi	92,336	14.7
Democratic	Craig 'Tax Freeze' Freis	65,256	10.4
Democratic	Gregorio Alejandro Armanta	53,130	8.4
Democratic	Gil Eisner	51,369	8.2
Total votes		629,826	100.0

1998 California State Board of Equalization District 4 Republican primary
Party	Candidate	Votes	%
Republican	Joe H. Adams, Jr.	198,881	80.6
Republican	Khalil Khalil	47,767	19.4
Total votes		246,648	100.0

1998 California State Board of Equalization District 4 Libertarian primary
Party	Candidate	Votes	%
Libertarian	William R. Jennings	24,026	100.0
Total votes		24,026	100.0

1998 California State Board of Equalization District 4 Green primary
Party	Candidate	Votes	%
Green	Glenn Trujillo Bailey	22,494	100.0
Total votes		22,494	100.0

1998 California State Board of Equalization District 4 Peace and Freedom primary
Party	Candidate	Votes	%
Peace and Freedom	Shirley Rachel Isaacson	22,040	100.0
Total votes		22,040	100.0

=== General election ===
==== Candidates ====
- Joe H. Adams, Jr. (R)
- Glenn Trujillo Bailey (G)
- John Chiang (D)
- Shirley Rachel Isaacson (P&F)
- William R. Jennings (L)

==== Results ====
California's 4th Board of Equalization district, 1998
Party	Candidate	Votes	%
Democratic	John Chiang	881,724	60.2
Republican	Joe H. Adams, Jr.	437,171	29.9
Green	Glenn Trujillo Bailey	58,480	4.0
Peace and Freedom	Shirley Rachel Isaacson	45,104	3.1
Libertarian	William R. Jennings	41,514	2.8
Total votes		1,463,993	100.0
Invalid or blank votes		194,842	11.7
Democratic hold			
