= California Franchise Tax Board =

American state government agency

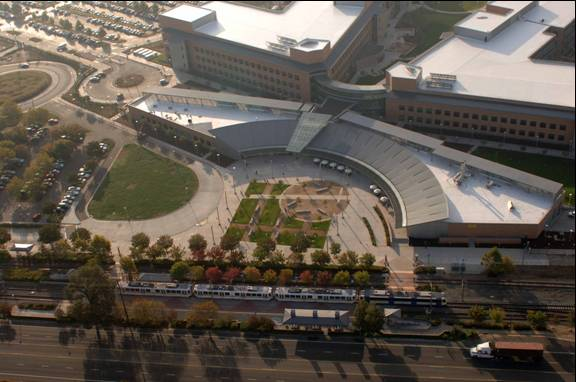
- California Franchise Tax Board headquarters building in Sacramento, California

Board overview
- Formed: 1929
- Jurisdiction: Government of California
- Headquarters: Sacramento, California; 38°34′00″N 121°20′46″W
- Board executives: Malia Cohen, California State Controller; Sally Lieber, Chair of the California State Board of Equalization; Erika Li, Interm Director of Finance
- Parent Agency: California Government Operations Agency
- Website: ftb.ca.gov

The California Franchise Tax Board (FTB) administers and collects state personal income tax and corporate franchise and income tax of California. It is part of the California Government Operations Agency.

The board is composed of the California State Controller, the director of the California Department of Finance, and the chair of the California State Board of Equalization. The chief administrative official is the executive officer of the Franchise Tax Board.

== History ==
In 1879, California adopted its state constitution which among many other programs created the State Board of Equalization and the State Controller, which administered all tax programs.

In 1929, the state legislature created the office of the Franchise Tax Commissioner to administer California's Bank and Corporation Franchise Tax Act.

In 1950, California abolished the office of the Franchise Tax Commissioner and created the Franchise Tax Board as it exists today.

The Executive Officers of the Franchise Tax Board have been:

- John J. Campbell (1950–1963)
- Martin Huff (1963–1979)
- Gerald H. Goldberg (1980–2005)
- Selvi Stanislaus (2006–present), the first woman to hold the post

== Members ==
The three members of the Franchise Tax Board are the California State Controller, the Chair of the California State Board of Equalization, and the Director of the California Department of Finance. The State Controller and the Chair of the Board of Equalization are elected officials, while the Director of the Department of Finance is appointed by the Governor of California. The State Controller is elected to a four-year term, and the Director of the Department of Finance serves at the pleasure of the Governor, who is elected to a four-year term. The four members of the State Board of Equalization typically take a one-year turn acting as Chair during their four-year elected term.

Year	Controller	BOE Chair	Director of Finance
1950	Thomas Kuchel (R)	George R. Reilly	James S. Dean (Note: James S. Dean resigned, effective October 30, 1953. He was replaced by the appointment of John M. Pierce, effective November 1, 1953.)
1951	Thomas Kuchel (R)	James H. Quinn	James S. Dean
1952	Thomas Kuchel (R)	Jerrold L. Seawell	James S. Dean
1953	Robert C. Kirkwood (R) (Note: Thomas H. Kuchel resigned, effective January 2, 1953, after his election as a US Senator. He was replaced by the appointment of Robert C. Kirkwood, effective January 6, 1953.)	William G. Bonelli	James S. Dean
1954	Robert C. Kirkwood (R)	George R. Reilly	John M. Pierce (Note: John M. Pierce resigned, effective July 14, 1958. He was replaced by the appointment of T.H. Mugford, effective July 15, 1958.)
1955	Robert C. Kirkwood (R)	James H. Quinn	John M. Pierce
1956	Robert C. Kirkwood (R)	Paul R. Leake	John M. Pierce
1957	Robert C. Kirkwood (R)	Robert E. McDavid	John M. Pierce
1958	Robert C. Kirkwood (R)	George R. Reilly	John M. Peirce
1958	Robert C. Kirkwood (R)	George R. Reilly	T.H. Mugford
1959	Alan Cranston (D)	Paul R. Leake	Bert W. Levitt (Note: Bert W. Levitt resigned, effective July 31, 1959. He was replaced by the appointment of John E. Carr, effective August 1, 1959.)
1960	Alan Cranston (D)	John W. Lynch	John E. Carr (Note: John E. Carr resigned, effective June 30, 1961. He was replaced by the appointment of Hale Champion, effective July 1, 1961.)
1961	Alan Cranston (D)	John W. Lynch	Hale Champion
1962	Alan Cranston (D)	George R. Reilly	Hale Champion
1963	Alan Cranston (D)	John W. Lynch	Hale Champion
1964	Alan Cranston (D)	Paul R. Leake	Hale Champion
1965	Alan Cranston (D)	John W. Lynch	Hale Champion
1966	Alan Cranston (D)	George R. Reilly	Hale Champion
1967	Houston I. Flournoy (R)	Paul R. Leake	Gordon P. Smith (Note: Gordon P. Smith resigned, effective February 29, 1968. He was replaced by the appointment of Caspar W. Weinberger, effective March 1, 1968.)
1968	Houston I. Flournoy (R)	Richard Nevins	Caspar W. Weinberger
1969	Houston I. Flournoy (R)	John W. Lynch	Caspar W. Weinberger
1970	Houston I. Flournoy (R)	George R. Reilly	Verne Orr
1971	Houston I. Flournoy (R)	Richard Nevins	Verne Orr
1972	Houston I. Flournoy (R)	John W. Lynch	Verne Orr
1973	Houston I. Flournoy (R)	William M. Bennett	Verne Orr
1974	Houston I. Flournoy (R)	William M. Bennett	Verne Orr
1975	Ken Cory (D)	John W. Lynch	Roy M. Bell (Note: Roy M. Bell resigned, effective November 30, 1978. He was replaced by the appointment of Richard T. Silberman, effective December 1, 1978.)
1976	Ken Cory (D)	William M. Bennett	Roy M. Bell
1977	Ken Cory (D)	William M. Bennett	Roy M. Bell
1978	Ken Cory (D)	George R. Reilly	Roy M. Bell
1979	Ken Cory (D)	William M. Bennett	Richard Silberman (Note: Richard T. Silberman resigned, effective August 20, 1979. He was replaced by the appointment of Mary Ann Graves, effective August 21, 1979.)
1980	Ken Cory (D)	Richard Nevins	Mary Ann Graves
1981	Ken Cory (D)	Ernest J. Dronenburg, Jr.	Mary Ann Graves
1982	Ken Cory (D)	William M. Bennett	Mary Ann Graves
1983	Ken Cory (D)	William M. Bennett	Michael Franchetti
1984	Ken Cory (D)	Richard Nevins	Jesse Huff
1985	Ken Cory (D)	Ernest J. Dronenburg, Jr.	Jesse Huff
1986	Ken Cory (D)	Richard Nevins	Jesse Huff
1987	Gray Davis (D)	Conway H. Collis	Jesse Huff
1988	Gray Davis (D)	Ernest J. Dronenburg, Jr.	Jesse Huff
1989	Gray Davis (D)	Paul B. Carpenter	Jesse Huff
1990	Gray Davis (D)	Conway Collis	Jesse Huff
1991	Gray Davis (D)	Brad Sherman	Thomas W. Hayes
1992	Gray Davis (D)	Brad Sherman	Thomas W. Hayes
1993	Gray Davis (D)	Brad Sherman	Thomas W. Hayes
1994	Gray Davis (D)	Brad Sherman	Russell Gould (Note: Russell Gould resigned, effective February 23, 1996. He was replaced by the appointment of Craig L. Brown, effective March 4, 1996.)
1995	Kathleen Connell (D)	Brad Sherman	Russell Gould
1996	Kathleen Connell (D)	Johan Klehs	Craig L. Brown
1997	Kathleen Connell (D)	Ernest Dronenburg, Jr.	Craig L. Brown
1998	Kathleen Connell (D)	Dean Andal	Craig L. Brown
1999	Kathleen Connell (D)	Johann Klehs	B. Timothy Gage
2000	Kathleen Connell (D)	Dean Andal	B. Timothy Gage
2001	Kathleen Connell (D)	Claude Parrish	B. Timothy Gage
2002	Kathleen Connell (D)	John Chiang	B. Timothy Gage
2003	Steve Westly (D)	Carole Migden	Steve Peace (Note: Governor Arnold Schwarzenegger appointed Donna Arduin as director of finance on his first day in office after the 2003 recall election to replace Steve Peace, who was finance director under Governor Gray Davis.)
2003	Steve Westly (D)	Carole Migden	Donna Arduin (Note: Donna Arduin resigned, effective October 18, 2004, to accept an appointment to the board of directors of a private firm and was replaced by the appointment of Tom Campbell, effective December 1, 2004.)
2004	Steve Westly (D)	Carole Migden	Donna Arduin
2005	Steve Westly (D)	John Chiang	Tom Campbell (Note: Tom Campbell resigned, effective November 10, 2005, to return to his post as dean of the Haas School of Business at the University of California at Berkeley and was replaced by the appointment of Michael C. Genest, effective December 1, 2005.)
2006	Steve Westly (D)	John Chiang	Michael C. Genest (Note: Michael C. Genest resigned effective December 14, 2009 and was replaced by the appointment of Ana J. Matosantos, effective December 31, 2009.)
2007	John Chiang (D)	Betty Yee	Michael C. Genest
2008	John Chiang (D)	Judy Chu	Michael C. Genest
2009	John Chiang (D)	Betty Yee	Michael C. Genest
2010	John Chiang (D)	Betty Yee	Ana J. Matosantos (Note: Ana J. Matosantos resigned, effective December 7, 2010, to run Governor-elect Jerry Brown's transition team. Cythina Bryant served as interim director of finance from December 7, 2010, to January 3, 2011, when Matosantos returned as director after Brown was sworn in as governor.); Cynthia Bryant
2011	John Chiang (D)	Jerome Horton	Ana J. Matosantos (Note: Ana J. Matosantos resigned, effective September 13, 2013. She was replaced by the appointment of Michael Cohen, effective September 14, 2013.)
2012	John Chiang (D)	Jerome Horton	Ana J. Matosantos
2013	John Chiang (D)	Jerome Horton	Ana J. Matosantos
2014	John Chiang (D)	Jerome Horton	Michael Cohen (Note: Michael Cohen resigned, effective August 20, 2018. He was replaced by the appointment of Keely Bosler, effective August 21, 2018.)
2015	Betty Yee (D)	Jerome Horton	Michael Cohen
2016	Betty Yee (D)	Fiona Ma	Michael Cohen
2017	Betty Yee (D)	Diane Harkey	Michael Cohen
2018	Betty Yee (D)	George Runner	Michael Cohen
2019	Betty Yee (D)	Malia Cohen	Keely Bosler (Note: Keely Bosler resigned, effective July 31, 2022. She was replaced by the appointment of Joe Stephenshaw, effective August 1, 2022.)
2020	Betty Yee (D)	Tony Vazquez	Keely Bosler
2021	Betty Yee (D)	Tony Vazquez	Keely Bosler
2022	Betty Yee (D)	Malia Cohen	Keely Bosler
2023	Malia Cohen (D)	Tony Vazquez	Joe Stephenshaw
2024	Malia Cohen (D)	Sally Lieber	Joe Stephenshaw

== Tax programs ==
=== Personal income tax ===
The FTB collects personal state income taxes. The FTB collects income taxes from California residents on their income from all sources. Meanwhile, non-residents are taxed on their California-based income. In recent years, the FTB collects more than $50 billion each year in personal income taxes.

=== Corporate income tax ===
The FTB levies a franchise tax on businesses for doing business in California. The FTB's name reflects the fact that it was originally created to collect this tax. The agency's name was left unchanged even after the state created a personal income tax and added it to the FTB's responsibilities.

The corporate tax is imposed on businesses that do business in California and derive income from within California. Over the past decade, the FTB has collected an average of $9.5 billion per year in corporate income taxes.

In addition to taxing entities formed or doing business in California, the FTB previously asserted franchise tax jurisdiction over members or partners of passthrough entities formed or doing business in California. In 2010, the FTB asserted that owning as little as 0.2% of a California-based LLC constituted doing business in California and requiring the payment of franchise tax. This position was overruled by the Office of Tax Appeals and the California Court of Appeal in 2017 and 2018.

== Non-tax programs ==
The FTB also collects delinquent vehicle registration debt collections on behalf of the California Department of Motor Vehicles and delinquent court ordered debt. The FTB also does financial audits of certain candidates for state office, ballot proposition committees, and lobbyists, according to a random selection process by the California Fair Political Practices Commission.

== See also ==
- State income tax
- State tax levels
- Taxation in the United States
