= 1994 California State Board of Equalization election =

1994 California State Board of Equalization elections
- November 8, 1994

All 4 seats on the California State Board of Equalization
	Majority party	Minority party
Party	Republican	Democratic
Last election	1	3
Seats before	2	2
Seats won	2	2
Seat change	Steady	Steady
Popular vote	3,734,744	3,388,312
Percentage	49.4%	44.8%

The 1994 California State Board of Equalization elections took place on November 8, 1994, to elect all four seats of the State Board of Equalization, with the primary election taking place on June 7, 1994.

== Overview ==
California State Board of Equalization general election, 1994
Party	Candidates	Votes		Seats			
Party	Candidates	No.	%	Before	After	+/–	%
Republican Party	4	3,734,744	49.4%	2	2	Steady	50.0%
Democratic Party	4	3,388,312	44.8%	2	2	Steady	50.0%
Libertarian Party	2	167,896	2.2%	0	0	Steady	0.0%
American Independent Party	1	140,030	1.9%	0	0	Steady	0.0%
Peace and Freedom Party	2	130,761	1.7%	0	0	Steady	0.0%
Total	13	7,561,743	100.0%	4	4	Steady	100.0%

Popular vote
Republican	49.4%
Democratic	44.8%
Libertarian	2.2%
American Independent	1.9%
Peace and Freedom	1.7%

Board of Equalization seats
Democratic	50.0%
Republican	50.0%

Board of Equalization District	Incumbent	Party	Elected officeholder	Party
1st	William M. Bennett	Democratic	Johan Klehs	Democratic
2nd	Brad Sherman	Democratic	Dean Andal	Republican
3rd	Ernest J. Dronenburg, Jr.	Republican	Ernest J. Dronenburg, Jr.	Republican
4th	Matt Fong	Republican	Brad Sherman	Democratic

== District 1 ==
The incumbent was Democrat William M. Bennett, who was elected in 1986 and 1990. He did not run for reelection.

=== Primary election ===
==== Results ====
1994 California State Board of Equalization District 1 Democratic primary
Party	Candidate	Votes	%
Democratic	Johan Klehs	247,579	44.2
Democratic	Mike Simmons	160,682	28.7
Democratic	Rich Taylor	96,595	17.2
Democratic	John Shimmon	55,724	9.9
Total votes		560,580	100.0
Invalid or blank votes		265,581	32.1

1994 California State Board of Equalization District 1 Republican primary
Party	Candidate	Votes	%
Republican	Robert 'Bob' Strawn	207,893	59.4
Republican	Mark S. Bendick	141,908	40.6
Total votes		349,801	100.0
Invalid or blank votes		160,081	31.4

1994 California State Board of Equalization District 1 Libertarian primary
Party	Candidate	Votes	%
Libertarian	Kennita Watson	4,327	100.0
Total votes		4,327	100.0

=== General election ===
==== Candidates ====
- Johan Klehs (D), member of the California State Assembly (1982-1994)
- Robert 'Bob' Strawn (R)
- Kennita Watson (L)

==== Results ====
California's 1st Board of Equalization district, 1994
Party	Candidate	Votes	%
Democratic	Johan Klehs	1,107,750	51.5
Republican	Robert 'Bob' Strawn	885,235	41.1
Libertarian	Kennita Watson	159,144	7.4
Total votes		2,152,129	100.0
Invalid or blank votes		420,165	16.5
Democratic hold			

== District 2 ==
The incumbent was Democrat Brad Sherman, who was elected in 1990 with 51.1% of the vote. He was running for reelection, but got redistricted to the 4th district.

=== Primary election ===
==== Results ====
1994 California State Board of Equalization District 2 Democratic primary
Party	Candidate	Votes	%
Democratic	Robert Presley	162,576	35.4
Democratic	Joseph F. Micallef	91,877	20.0
Democratic	Holly Hoyt	83,191	18.1
Democratic	Frank Navarrette	70,770	15.5
Democratic	Mark L. Stebbins	51,186	11.1
Total votes		459,600	100.0
Invalid or blank votes		135,329	22.7

1994 California State Board of Equalization District 2 Republican primary
Party	Candidate	Votes	%
Republican	Dean Andal	180,089	36.5
Republican	Claude Parrish	159,222	32.3
Republican	Harold W. Bertholf	109,286	22.2
Republican	Ron Glenn	44,138	9.0
Total votes		492,735	100.0
Invalid or blank votes		154,637	23.9

1994 California State Board of Equalization District 2 American Independent primary
Party	Candidate	Votes	%
American Independent	Ernest Vance	6,087	100.0
Total votes		6,087	100.0
Invalid or blank votes		5,947	49.4

=== General election ===
==== Candidates ====
- Dean Andal (R), member of the California State Assembly (1991-1994)
- Robert Presley (D)
- Ernest Vance (AI)

==== Results ====
California's 2nd Board of Equalization district, 1994
Party	Candidate	Votes	%
Republican	Dean Andal	1,129,995	54.1
Democratic	Robert Presley	817,539	39.2
American Independent	Ernest Vance	140,030	6.7
Total votes		2,087,564	100.0
Invalid or blank votes		239,140	10.3
Republican gain from Democratic			

== District 3 ==
The incumbent was Republican Ernest J. Dronenburg, Jr., who was elected in 1986 and 1990. He ran for reelection.

=== Primary election ===
==== Results ====
1994 California State Board of Equalization District 3 Democratic primary
Party	Candidate	Votes	%
Democratic	Mary Christian-Heising	194,004	54.4
Democratic	Floyd L. Morrow	162,894	45.6
Total votes		356,898	100.0
Invalid or blank votes		129,598	26.6

1994 California State Board of Equalization District 3 Republican primary
Party	Candidate	Votes	%
Republican	Ernest J. Dronenburg, Jr. (incumbent)	454,813	100.0
Total votes		454,813	100.0
Invalid or blank votes		224,723	33.1

1994 California State Board of Equalization District 3 Libertarian primary
Party	Candidate	Votes	%
Libertarian	Ken Mason	4,238	100.0
Total votes		4,238	100.0
Invalid or blank votes		881	17.2

1994 California State Board of Equalization District 3 Peace and Freedom primary
Party	Candidate	Votes	%
Peace and Freedom	Maxine B. Quirk	926	100.0
Total votes		926	100.0
Invalid or blank votes		617	40.0

=== General election ===
==== Candidates ====
- Mary Christian-Heising (D)
- Ernest J. Dronenburg, Jr. (R), incumbent member of the Board of Equalization
- Ken Mason (L)
- Maxine B. Quirk (P&F)

==== Results ====
California's 3rd Board of Equalization district, 1994
Party	Candidate	Votes	%
Republican	Ernest J. Dronenburg, Jr. (incumbent)	1,179,103	59.2
Democratic	Mary Christian-Heising	660,596	33.2
Libertarian	Ken Mason	103,711	5.2
Peace and Freedom	Maxine B. Quirk	47,226	2.4
Total votes		1,990,636	100.0
Invalid or blank votes		295,344	12.9
Republican hold			

== District 4 ==
The incumbent was Republican Matt Fong, who was appointed in 1991 to finish the term of Paul B. Carpenter, who resigned due to criminal charges. Fong ran to become the California State Treasurer, and incumbent Democrat Brad Sherman was redistricted from the 2nd district.

=== Primary election ===
==== Results ====
1994 California State Board of Equalization District 4 Democratic primary
Party	Candidate	Votes	%
Democratic	Brad Sherman (incumbent)	176,988	42.8
Democratic	Albert Robles	67,946	16.4
Democratic	Al Koch	64,535	15.6
Democratic	Glanda L. Sherman	53,305	12.9
Democratic	Jerome Edgar Horton	30,152	7.3
Democratic	David Elder	20,622	5.0
Total votes		413,548	100.0
Invalid or blank votes		112,638	21.4

1994 California State Board of Equalization District 4 Republican primary
Party	Candidate	Votes	%
Republican	Ernie Dynda	145,205	63.1
Republican	Hal J. Styles Jr.	84,845	36.9
Total votes		230,050	100.0
Invalid or blank votes		86,013	27.2

1994 California State Board of Equalization District 4 Libertarian primary
Party	Candidate	Votes	%
Libertarian	Lawrence D. Goldberg	1,838	100.0
Total votes		1,838	100.0
Invalid or blank votes		511	21.8

1994 California State Board of Equalization District 4 Peace and Freedom primary
Party	Candidate	Votes	%
Peace and Freedom	Shirley Rachel Isaacson	910	100.0
Total votes		910	100.0
Invalid or blank votes		661	42.1

=== General election ===
==== Candidates ====
- Ernie Dynda (R)
- Brad Sherman (D), incumbent member of the Board of Equalization
- Shirley Rachel Isaacson (P&F)
- Lawrence D. Goldberg (L)

==== Results ====
California's 4th Board of Equalization district, 1994
Party	Candidate	Votes	%
Democratic	Brad Sherman (incumbent)	802,427	53.8
Republican	Ernie Dynda	540,411	36.3
Peace and Freedom	Shirley Rachel Isaacson	83,535	5.6
Libertarian	Lawrence D. Goldberg	64,185	4.3
Total votes		1,490,558	100.0
Invalid or blank votes		225,672	14.9
Democratic gain from Republican			
