= 1998 California State Assembly election =

- November 3, 1998

All 80 seats in the California State Assembly 41 seats needed for a majority
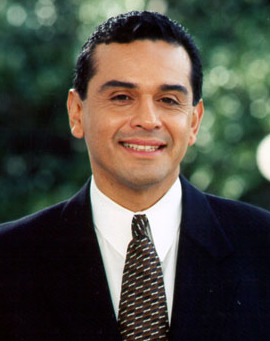

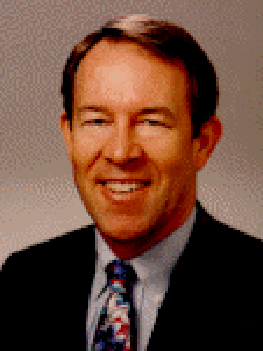
	Majority party	Minority party
Leader	Antonio Villaraigosa	Bill Leonard (retired as leader)
Party	Democratic	Republican
Leader's seat	45th–Los Angeles	63rd–San Bernardino
Last election	43 seats, 49.42%	37 seats, 46.07%
Seats won	48	32
Seat change	▲5	▼5
Popular vote	4,106,175	3,494,503
Percentage	52.65%	44.81%
- Democratic gain Democratic hold Republican hold 40–50% 50–60% 60–70% 70–80% 80–90% >90% 40–50% 50–60% 60–70% 70–80% >90%
Speaker before election
Antonio Villaraigosa
Democratic
Elected Speaker
Antonio Villaraigosa
Democratic

The 1998 California State Assembly elections were held on November 3, 1998. California's State Assembly in its entirety comes up for election in even numbered years. Each seat has a two-year term and members are limited to three 2-year terms (six years). All 80 biennially elected seats in the Assembly were up for election this year. Democrats retained control of the Assembly, gaining five Republican-held seats in the process.

== Overview ==
California State Assembly elections, 1998
Party	Votes	Percentage	Incumbents	Open	Before	After	Special	+/–
Democratic	4,106,175	52.65%	32	11	43	48	47	+4
Republican	3,494,503	44.81%	23	14	37	32	32	-5
Libertarian	144,427	1.85%	0	0	0	0	0	0
Natural Law	23,384	0.30%	0	0	0	0	0	0
Peace and Freedom	19,362	0.25%	0	0	0	0	0	0
Reform	4,256	0.05%	0	0	0	0	0	0
Green	4,093	0.05%	0	0	0	0	1	+1
American Independent	2,678	0.03%	0	0	0	0	0	0
Invalid or blank votes	842,620	9.75%	—	—	—	—	—	—
Totals	8,641,498	100.00%	55	25	80	80	80	—

↓
48	32
Democratic	Republican

== Results ==
Final results from the California Secretary of State:

=== District 1 ===
California's 1st State Assembly district election, 1998
Party	Candidate	Votes	%
Democratic	Virginia Strom-Martin (incumbent)	87,403	61.72
Republican	Sam Crump	47,662	33.66
Peace and Freedom	Pamela Elizondo	6,536	4.62
Invalid or blank votes		7,797	5.22
Total votes		149,398	100.00
Democratic hold			

=== District 2 ===
California's 2nd State Assembly district election, 1998
Party	Candidate	Votes	%
Republican	Richard L. Dickerson	71,357	56.74
Democratic	Francie L. Sullivan	50,202	39.92
Libertarian	Pete Bret	4,196	3.34
Invalid or blank votes		7,901	5.91
Total votes		133,656	100.00
Republican hold			

=== District 3 ===
California's 3rd State Assembly district election, 1998
Party	Candidate	Votes	%
Republican	Sam Aanestad	78,683	60.90
Democratic	Scott Gruendl	50,511	39.10
Invalid or blank votes		10.028	7.08
Total votes		139,222	100.00
Republican hold			

=== District 4 ===
California's 4th State Assembly district election, 1998
Party	Candidate	Votes	%
Republican	Rico Oller (incumbent)	103,688	61.66
Democratic	Mark A. Norberg	57,492	34.19
Libertarian	Robert L. "Bob" Mulvany	6,980	4.15
Invalid or blank votes		14,359	7.87
Total votes		182,519	100.00
Republican hold			

=== District 5 ===
California's 5th State Assembly district election, 1998
Party	Candidate	Votes	%
Republican	Dave Cox	74,497	57.24
Democratic	Linda Davis	51,150	39.30
Libertarian	Eugene Frazier	4,496	3.45
Invalid or blank votes		11,223	7.94
Total votes		141,366	100.00
Republican hold			

=== District 6 ===
California's 6th State Assembly district election, 1998
Party	Candidate	Votes	%
Democratic	Kerry Mazzoni (incumbent)	99,887	67.33
Republican	Russ Weiner	45,237	30.49
Peace and Freedom	Coleman C. Persily	3,221	2.17
Invalid or blank votes		10,763	6.76
Total votes		159,108	100.00
Democratic hold			

=== District 7 ===
California's 7th State Assembly district election, 1998
Party	Candidate	Votes	%
Democratic	Pat Wiggins	80,178	62.13
Republican	Bob Sanchez	43,398	33.63
Libertarian	Mike Rodrigues	3,694	2.86
Peace and Freedom	Irv Sutley	1,773	1.37
Invalid or blank votes		8,532	6.20
Total votes		137,575	100.00
Democratic hold			

=== District 8 ===
California's 8th State Assembly district election, 1998
Party	Candidate	Votes	%
Democratic	Helen M. Thomson (incumbent)	73,315	64.19
Republican	Toni Thompson	40,904	35.81
Invalid or blank votes		10,333	8.30
Total votes		124,552	100.00
Democratic hold			

=== District 9 ===
California's 9th State Assembly district election, 1998
Party	Candidate	Votes	%
Democratic	Darrell Steinberg	66,867	72.32
Republican	Mike Dismukes	25,591	27.68
Invalid or blank votes		11,989	11.48
Total votes		104,447	100.00
Democratic hold			

=== District 10 ===
California's 10th State Assembly district election, 1998
Party	Candidate	Votes	%
Republican	Anthony Pescetti	67,535	48.68
Democratic	Debra Gravert	67,249	48.47
Libertarian	Tom Kohlhepp	3,960	2.85
Invalid or blank votes		11,992	7.96
Total votes		150,736	100.00
Republican hold			

=== District 11 ===
California's 11th State Assembly district election, 1998
Party	Candidate	Votes	%
Democratic	Tom Torlakson (incumbent)	80,323	69.02
Republican	Allen D. Payton	36,046	30.98
Invalid or blank votes		8,427	6.75
Total votes		124,796	100.00
Democratic hold			

=== District 12 ===
California's 12th State Assembly district election, 1998
Party	Candidate	Votes	%
Democratic	Kevin Shelley (incumbent)	80,962	80.50
Republican	Howard Epstein	19,615	19.50
Invalid or blank votes		23,956	19.24
Total votes		124,533	100.00
Democratic hold			

=== District 13 ===
California's 13th State Assembly district election, 1998
Party	Candidate	Votes	%
Democratic	Carole Migden (incumbent)	95,218	84.80
Republican	Randy Bernard	17,073	15.20
Invalid or blank votes		19,483	14.79
Total votes		131,774	100.00
Democratic hold			

=== District 14 ===
California's 14th State Assembly district election, 1998
Party	Candidate	Votes	%
Democratic	Dion Aroner (incumbent)	103,726	87.16
Republican	Jerald Udinsky	15,287	12.84
Invalid or blank votes		13,875	10.44
Total votes		132,888	100.00
Democratic hold			

=== District 15 ===
California's 15th State Assembly district election, 1998
Party	Candidate	Votes	%
Republican	Lynne C. Leach (incumbent)	94,589	59.36
Democratic	Charles W. Brydon	60,662	38.07
Libertarian	R. Duncan Wheat	4,110	2.58
Invalid or blank votes		14,324	8.25
Total votes		173,685	100.00
Republican hold			

=== District 16 ===
California's 16th State Assembly district election, 1998
Party	Candidate	Votes	%
Democratic	Don Perata (incumbent)	71,548	80.33
Republican	Linda Marchall	17,517	19.67
Invalid or blank votes		12,931	12.68
Total votes		101,996	100.00
Democratic hold			

=== District 17 ===
California's 17th State Assembly district election, 1998
Party	Candidate	Votes	%
Democratic	Michael Machado (incumbent)	61,556	68.89
Republican	Jay Smart	27,794	31.11
Invalid or blank votes		7,485	7.73
Total votes		96,835	100.00
Democratic hold			

=== District 18 ===
California's 18th State Assembly district election, 1998
Party	Candidate	Votes	%
Democratic	Ellen M. Corbett	63,491	65.76
Republican	Carol Nowicki	33,060	34.24
Invalid or blank votes		10,400	9.72
Total votes		106,951	100.00
Democratic hold			

=== District 19 ===
California's 19th State Assembly district election, 1998
Party	Candidate	Votes	%
Democratic	Lou Papan (incumbent)	75,980	71.26
Republican	Penny Ferguson	26,446	24.80
Libertarian	Steve Marsland	4,203	3.94
Invalid or blank votes		8,085	7.05
Total votes		114,714	100.00
Democratic hold			

=== District 20 ===
California's 20th State Assembly district election, 1998
Party	Candidate	Votes	%
Democratic	John A. Dutra	52,132	57.69
Republican	Jonelle Joan Zager	38,239	42.31
Invalid or blank votes		10,068	10.02
Total votes		100,439	100.00
Democratic hold			

=== District 21 ===
California's 21st State Assembly district election, 1998
Party	Candidate	Votes	%
Democratic	Ted Lempert (incumbent)	89,221	70.08
Republican	Laverne F. Atherly	35,053	27.53
Natural Law	Marilyn M. Bryant	3,036	2.38
Invalid or blank votes		10,995	7.95
Total votes		138,305	100.00
Democratic hold			

=== District 22 ===
California's 22nd State Assembly district election, 1998
Party	Candidate	Votes	%
Democratic	Elaine Alquist (incumbent)	61,980	63.80
Republican	Stan Kawczynski	30,186	31.07
Libertarian	Raul Rako	3,562	3.67
Natural Law	Rick Dunstan	1,414	1.46
Invalid or blank votes		11,575	10.65
Total votes		108,717	100.00
Democratic hold			

=== District 23 ===
California's 23rd State Assembly district election, 1998
Party	Candidate	Votes	%
Democratic	Mike Honda (incumbent)	45,340	75.77
Republican	Patrick Du Long	14,498	24.23
Invalid or blank votes		6,125	9.29
Total votes		65,963	100.00
Democratic hold			

=== District 24 ===
California's 24th State Assembly district election, 1998
Party	Candidate	Votes	%
Republican	Jim Cunneen (incumbent)	69,371	57.26
Democratic	Phil Stokes	47,140	38.91
Libertarian	H. Raymond Strong	4,635	3.83
Invalid or blank votes		13,690	10.15
Total votes		134,836	100.00
Republican hold			

=== District 25 ===
California's 25th State Assembly district election, 1998
Party	Candidate	Votes	%
Republican	George House (incumbent)	75,775	61.86
Democratic	Wesley Firch	42,935	35.05
Libertarian	Jonathan Zwickel	2,013	1.64
Reform	Leonard M. Surratt	1,768	1.44
Invalid or blank votes		8,360	6.39
Total votes		130,851	100.00
Republican hold			

=== District 26 ===
California's 26th State Assembly district election, 1998
Party	Candidate	Votes	%
Democratic	Dennis Cardoza (incumbent)	53,059	64.07
Republican	Patty Hollingsworth	27,848	33.63
Libertarian	David Eaton	1,128	1.36
American Independent	Carl Towe	776	0.94
Invalid or blank votes		3,285	3.82
Total votes		86,096	100.00
Democratic hold			

=== District 27 ===
California's 27th State Assembly district election, 1998
Party	Candidate	Votes	%
Democratic	Fred Keeley (incumbent)	81,234	65.34
Republican	Phil H. Chavez	38,063	30.62
Libertarian	Dirk Walker Deardorff	5,021	4.04
Invalid or blank votes		8,797	6.61
Total votes		133,115	100.00
Democratic hold			

=== District 28 ===
California's 28th State Assembly district election, 1998
Party	Candidate	Votes	%
Republican	Peter Frusetta (incumbent)	47,735	51.63
Democratic	Alan D. Styles	40,652	43.97
Libertarian	Kate Woods	4,063	4.39
Invalid or blank votes		6,590	6.65
Total votes		99,030	100.00
Republican hold			

=== District 29 ===
California's 29th State Assembly district election, 1998
Party	Candidate	Votes	%
Republican	Mike Briggs	83,080	91.22
No party	Bill Maze (write-in)	8,000	8.78
Invalid or blank votes		39,644	30.33
Total votes		130,724	100.00
Republican hold			

=== District 30 ===
California's 30th State Assembly district election, 1998
Party	Candidate	Votes	%
Democratic	Dean Florez	37,058	54.36
Republican	Robert M. Prenter, Jr. (incumbent)	31,116	45.64
Invalid or blank votes		4,707	6.46
Total votes		72,881	100.00
Democratic gain from Republican			

=== District 31 ===
California's 31st State Assembly district election, 1998
Party	Candidate	Votes	%
Democratic	Sarah L. Reyes	36,553	58.98
Republican	David Jackson	25,426	41.02
Invalid or blank votes		3,199	4.91
Total votes		65,178	100.00
Democratic hold			

=== District 32 ===
California's 32nd State Assembly district election, 1998
Party	Candidate	Votes	%
Republican	Roy Ashburn (incumbent)	73,285	70.93
Democratic	Robert "Bob" Tucker	30,029	29.07
Invalid or blank votes		7,828	7.04
Total votes		111,142	100.00
Republican hold			

=== District 33 ===
California's 33rd State Assembly district election, 1998
Party	Candidate	Votes	%
Republican	Abel Maldonado	76,596	60.34
Democratic	Betty Sanders	47,485	37.40
Libertarian	David L. Bersohn	2,868	2.26
Invalid or blank votes		5,189	3.93
Total votes		132,138	100.00
Republican hold			

=== District 34 ===
California's 34th State Assembly district election, 1998
Party	Candidate	Votes	%
Republican	Keith Olberg (incumbent)	60,374	64.13
Democratic	Steve A. Figueroa	30,444	32.34
Libertarian	Jeffrey Lang	3,319	3.53
Invalid or blank votes		7,237	7.14
Total votes		101,374	100.00
Republican hold			

=== District 35 ===
California's 35th State Assembly district election, 1998
Party	Candidate	Votes	%
Democratic	Hannah-Beth Jackson	67,224	53.03
Republican	Christopher Mitchum	56,382	44.48
Natural Law	Eric Dahl	3,151	2.49
Invalid or blank votes		7,602	5.66
Total votes		135,359	100.00
Democratic gain from Republican			

=== District 36 ===
California's 36th State Assembly district election, 1998
Party	Candidate	Votes	%
Republican	George C. Runner (incumbent)	64,221	62.90
Democratic	Paula L. Calderon	34,697	33.98
Libertarian	Gregory James Bashem	3,190	3.12
Invalid or blank votes		7,541	6.88
Total votes		109,649	100.00
Republican hold			

=== District 37 ===
California's 37th State Assembly district election, 1998
Party	Candidate	Votes	%
Republican	Tony Strickland	49,853	48.88
Democratic	Rosalind Ann McGrath	48,553	47.60
Reform	Michael Farris	3,593	3.52
Invalid or blank votes		8,092	7.35
Total votes		110,091	100.00
Republican hold			

=== District 38 ===
California's 38th State Assembly district election, 1998
Party	Candidate	Votes	%
Republican	Tom McClintock (incumbent)	78,417	100.00
Invalid or blank votes		39,758	33.64
Total votes		118,175	100.00
Republican hold			

=== District 39 ===
California's 39th State Assembly district election, 1998
Party	Candidate	Votes	%
Democratic	Tony Cardenas (incumbent)	41,841	86.69
Libertarian	Christopher "Kit" Maira	6,423	13.31
Invalid or blank votes		6,102	11.22
Total votes		54,366	100.00
Democratic hold			

=== District 40 ===
California's 40th State Assembly district election, 1998
Party	Candidate	Votes	%
Democratic	Bob Hertzberg (incumbent)	51,145	68.75
Republican	Eunice Deleuw	18,998	25.54
Libertarian	Kelley L. Ross	4,245	5.71
Invalid or blank votes		7,469	9.12
Total votes		81,857	100.00
Democratic hold			

=== District 41 ===
California's 41st State Assembly district election, 1998
Party	Candidate	Votes	%
Democratic	Sheila Kuehl (incumbent)	82,302	62.73
Republican	K. Paul Jhin	45,414	34.62
Peace and Freedom	John Honigsfeld	3,479	2.65
Invalid or blank votes		12,570	8.74
Total votes		143,765	100.00
Democratic hold			

=== District 42 ===
California's 42nd State Assembly district election, 1998
Party	Candidate	Votes	%
Democratic	Wally Knox (incumbent)	81,130	74.01
Republican	Kevin B. Davis	24,140	22.02
Peace and Freedom	Nancy Lawrence	4,353	3.97
Invalid or blank votes		11,515	9.51
Total votes		121,138	100.00
Democratic hold			

=== District 43 ===
California's 43rd State Assembly district election, 1998
Party	Candidate	Votes	%
Democratic	Scott Wildman (incumbent)	55,256	65.04
Republican	Peter R. Repovich	26,749	31.48
Libertarian	Daniel White	1,793	2.11
Reform	Marie Buren	1,160	1.37
Invalid or blank votes		6,712	7.32
Total votes		91,670	100.00
Democratic hold			

=== District 44 ===
California's 44th State Assembly district election, 1998
Party	Candidate	Votes	%
Democratic	Jack Scott (incumbent)	65,652	56.49
Republican	Ken La Corte	46,652	40.14
Libertarian	Ken Saurenman	1,757	1.51
Green	Shawn Waddell	1,474	1.27
Reform	Philip Corvalan	689	0.59
Invalid or blank votes		8,439	6.77
Total votes		124,663	100.00
Democratic hold			

=== District 45 ===
California's 45th State Assembly district election, 1998
Party	Candidate	Votes	%
Democratic	Antonio Villaraigosa (incumbent)	40,001	82.19
Republican	Kitty Hedrick	8,666	17.81
Invalid or blank votes		5,402	9.99
Total votes		54,069	100.00
Democratic hold			

=== District 46 ===
California's 46th State Assembly district election, 1998
Party	Candidate	Votes	%
Democratic	Gilbert Cedillo (incumbent)	21,654	80.83
Republican	Andrew Kim	5,137	19.17
Invalid or blank votes		3,423	11.33
Total votes		30,214	100.00
Democratic hold			

=== District 47 ===
California's 47th State Assembly district election, 1998
Party	Candidate	Votes	%
Democratic	Herb Wesson	80,222	84.02
Republican	Jonathan Leonard	12,666	13.27
Libertarian	Eric Michael Fine	2,596	2.72
Invalid or blank votes		9,848	9.35
Total votes		105,332	100.00
Democratic hold			

=== District 48 ===
California's 48th State Assembly district election, 1998
Party	Candidate	Votes	%
Democratic	Roderick "Rod" Wright (incumbent)	43,736	94.69
Republican	Ernest Woods	2,455	5.31
Invalid or blank votes		4,937	9.66
Total votes		51,128	100.00
Democratic hold			

=== District 49 ===
California's 49th State Assembly district election, 1998
Party	Candidate	Votes	%
Democratic	Gloria Romero	43,800	71.22
Republican	Jay T. Imperial	16,066	26.12
Libertarian	Rachel Brown	1,634	2.66
Invalid or blank votes		7,349	10.67
Total votes		68,849	100.00
Democratic hold			

=== District 50 ===
California's 50th State Assembly district election, 1998
Party	Candidate	Votes	%
Democratic	Marco Antonio Firebaugh	30,592	84.73
Republican	Gladys O. Miller	5,514	15.27
Invalid or blank votes		3,795	9.51
Total votes		39,901	100.00
Democratic hold			

=== District 51 ===
California's 51st State Assembly district election, 1998
Party	Candidate	Votes	%
Democratic	Edward Vincent (incumbent)	52,951	76.99
Republican	Robert Acherman	13,202	19.20
Green	Rex Frankel	2,619	3.81
Invalid or blank votes		7,186	9.46
Total votes		75,958	100.00
Democratic hold			

=== District 52 ===
California's 52nd State Assembly district election, 1998
Party	Candidate	Votes	%
Democratic	Carl Washington (incumbent)	45,742	100.00
Invalid or blank votes		12,125	20.95
Total votes		57,867	100.00
Democratic hold			

=== District 53 ===
California's 53rd State Assembly district election, 1998
Party	Candidate	Votes	%
Democratic	George Nakano	75,159	60.59
Republican	Bill Eggers	48,880	39.41
Invalid or blank votes		9,507	7.12
Total votes		133,546	100.00
Democratic hold			

=== District 54 ===
California's 54th State Assembly district election, 1998
Party	Candidate	Votes	%
Democratic	Alan Lowenthal	54,330	49.57
Republican	Julie Alban	51,291	46.80
Libertarian	Al Carlan	2,073	1.89
American Independent	George P. "Phil" Drake	1,902	1.74
Invalid or blank votes		6,965	5.98
Total votes		118,561	100.00
Democratic gain from Republican			

=== District 55 ===
California's 55th State Assembly district election, 1998
Party	Candidate	Votes	%
Democratic	Richard E. "Dick" Floyd	44,407	76.58
Republican	Ervin "Don" Eslinger	11,434	19.72
Libertarian	Guy Wilson	2,149	3.71
Invalid or blank votes		5,356	8.46
Total votes		63,346	100.00
Democratic hold			

=== District 56 ===
California's 56th State Assembly district election, 1998
Party	Candidate	Votes	%
Democratic	Sally Havice (incumbent)	48,913	53.00
Republican	Phil Hawkins	40,972	44.39
Libertarian	Bruce J. McKenzie	2,409	2.61
Invalid or blank votes		6,210	6.30
Total votes		98,504	100.00
Democratic hold			

=== District 57 ===
California's 57th State Assembly district election, 1998
Party	Candidate	Votes	%
Democratic	Martin Gallegos (incumbent)	40,578	72.07
Republican	Henry E. Gonzales	15,722	27.93
Invalid or blank votes		6,007	9.64
Total votes		62,307	100.00
Democratic hold			

=== District 58 ===
California's 58th State Assembly district election, 1998
Party	Candidate	Votes	%
Democratic	Thomas M. Calderon	52,311	72.21
Republican	Albert J. Nunez	20,136	27.79
Invalid or blank votes		7,224	9.07
Total votes		79,671	100.00
Democratic hold			

=== District 59 ===
California's 59th State Assembly district election, 1998
Party	Candidate	Votes	%
Republican	Bob Margett (incumbent)	58,339	54.73
Democratic	Christian P. Christiansen	44,133	41.40
Natural Law	Louise M. Allison	2,269	2.13
Libertarian	Jerry Johnson	1,855	1.74
Invalid or blank votes		9,144	7.9
Total votes		115,740	100.00
Republican hold			

=== District 60 ===
California's 60th State Assembly district election, 1998
Party	Candidate	Votes	%
Republican	Robert Pacheco	47,333	52.48
Democratic	Ben Wong	40,678	45.10
Libertarian	Leland Thomas Faegre	2,175	2.41
No party	Jeff Hays (write-in)	0	0.00
Invalid or blank votes		7,937	8.09
Total votes		98,123	100.00
Republican hold			

=== District 61 ===
California's 61st State Assembly district election, 1998
Party	Candidate	Votes	%
Democratic	Nell Soto	37,382	56.21
Republican	Bob Demallie	29,127	43.79
Invalid or blank votes		6,621	9.05
Total votes		73,130	100.00
Democratic gain from Republican			

=== District 62 ===
California's 62nd State Assembly district election, 1998
Party	Candidate	Votes	%
Democratic	John Longville	36,365	64.57
Republican	Irma Escobar	19,956	35.43
Invalid or blank votes		6,716	10.65
Total votes		63,037	100.00
Democratic hold			

=== District 63 ===
California's 63rd State Assembly district election, 1998
Party	Candidate	Votes	%
Republican	Bill Leonard	67,563	71.73
Libertarian	Maureen K. Lindberg	26,622	28.27
Invalid or blank votes		18,076	16.10
Total votes		112,261	100.00
Republican hold			

=== District 64 ===
California's 64th State Assembly district election, 1998
Party	Candidate	Votes	%
Republican	Rod Pacheco (incumbent)	64,852	100.00
Invalid or blank votes		25,002	27.83
Total votes		89,854	100.00
Republican hold			

=== District 65 ===
California's 65th State Assembly district election, 1998
Party	Candidate	Votes	%
Republican	Brett Granlund (incumbent)	56,523	57.12
Democratic	Ray R. Quinto	39,286	39.70
Natural Law	Joseph "Ray" Renteria	3,144	3.18
Invalid or blank votes		7,419	6.97
Total votes		106,372	100.00
Republican hold			

=== District 66 ===
California's 66th State Assembly district election, 1998
Party	Candidate	Votes	%
Republican	Bruce Thompson (incumbent)	78,961	61.73
Democratic	Patsy Hockersmith	48,949	38.27
Invalid or blank votes		12,248	8.74
Total votes		140,158	100.00
Republican hold			

=== District 67 ===
California's 67th State Assembly district election, 1998
Party	Candidate	Votes	%
Republican	Scott Baugh (incumbent)	66,570	57.53
Democratic	Marie H. Fennell	43,372	37.48
Libertarian	Autumn Browne	5,772	4.99
Invalid or blank votes		13,198	10.24
Total votes		128,912	100.00
Republican hold			

=== District 68 ===
California's 68th State Assembly district election, 1998
Party	Candidate	Votes	%
Republican	Ken Maddox	41,326	53.68
Democratic	Mike Matsuda	35,654	46.32
Invalid or blank votes		8,130	9.55
Total votes		95,110	100.00
Republican hold			

=== District 69 ===
California's 69th State Assembly district election, 1998
Party	Candidate	Votes	%
Democratic	Lou Correa	23,664	54.72
Republican	Jim Morrissey (incumbent)	18,323	42.37
Reform	Al Snook	639	1.48
Libertarian	Bolynda Schultz	620	1.43
Invalid or blank votes		2,507	5.48
Total votes		45,753	100.00
Democratic gain from Republican			

=== District 70 ===
California's 70th State Assembly district election, 1998
Party	Candidate	Votes	%
Republican	Marilyn C. Brewer (incumbent)	84,433	77.42
Natural Law	Nat Adam	24,627	22.58
Invalid or blank votes		20,730	15.97
Total votes		129,790	100.00
Republican hold			

=== District 71 ===
California's 71st State Assembly district election, 1998
Party	Candidate	Votes	%
Republican	William J. Campbell (incumbent)	89,193	69.14
Democratic	Martha Badger	36,299	28.14
Natural Law	Brenda Jo Bryant	3,517	2.73
Invalid or blank votes		12,483	8.82
Total votes		141,492	100.00
Republican hold			

=== District 72 ===
California's 72nd State Assembly district election, 1998
Party	Candidate	Votes	%
Republican	Dick Ackerman (incumbent)	71,148	67.46
Democratic	Frank Legas	31,120	29.70
Libertarian	Loren Meierding	3,000	2.84
Invalid or blank votes		11,051	9.48
Total votes		115,319	100.00
Republican hold			

=== District 73 ===
California's 73rd State Assembly district election, 1998
Party	Candidate	Votes	%
Republican	Patricia Bates	71,333	66.36
Democratic	Robert D. Wilberg	31,220	29.04
Libertarian	Donald D. Rollins	3,512	3.27
Natural Law	Matteo Ornati	1,432	1.33
Invalid or blank votes		13,216	10.95
Total votes		120,713	100.00
Republican hold			

=== District 74 ===
California's 74th State Assembly district election, 1998
Party	Candidate	Votes	%
Republican	Howard Kaloogian (incumbent)	66,049	56.95
Democratic	William F. "Bill" Fitzgerald	44,809	38.64
Natural Law	Barbara Bourdette	2,707	2.33
Libertarian	Thomas M. Hohman	2,408	2.08
Invalid or blank votes		13,655	10.53
Total votes		129,628	100.00
Republican hold			

=== District 75 ===
California's 75th State Assembly district election, 1998
Party	Candidate	Votes	%
Republican	Charlene Zettel	79,365	64.31
Democratic	David Debus	34,407	27.88
Libertarian	Donna Tello	6,017	4.88
Natural Law	William S. Cowling III	3,630	2.94
Invalid or blank votes		20,687	14.36
Total votes		144,106	100.00
Republican hold			

=== District 76 ===
California's 76th State Assembly district election, 1998
Party	Candidate	Votes	%
Democratic	Susan Davis (incumbent)	70,244	65.32
Republican	Duane A. Admire	34,143	31.75
Libertarian	Edward M. Teyssier	3,159	2.94
Invalid or blank votes		12,342	10.29
Total votes		119,888	100.00
Democratic hold			

=== District 77 ===
California's 77th State Assembly district election, 1998
Party	Candidate	Votes	%
Republican	Steve Baldwin (incumbent)	56,622	57.80
Democratic	Margaret "Marge" Carlson	37,962	38.75
Libertarian	Elizabeth Myers	3,378	3.45
Invalid or blank votes		10,814	9.94
Total votes		108,776	100.00
Republican hold			

=== District 78 ===
California's 78th State Assembly district election, 1998
Party	Candidate	Votes	%
Democratic	Howard Wayne (incumbent)	65,566	56.61
Republican	Jean Roesch	44,484	38.40
Libertarian	John Murphy	3,551	3.07
Natural Law	Stuart Knoles	2,228	1.92
Invalid or blank votes		14,010	10.79
Total votes		129,839	100.00
Democratic hold			

=== District 79 ===
California's 79th State Assembly district election, 1998
Party	Candidate	Votes	%
Democratic	Denise Ducheny (incumbent)	39,636	76.43
Republican	Carl Hurum Kinz	12,226	23.57
Invalid or blank votes		8,502	14.08
Total votes		60,364	100.00
Democratic hold			

=== District 80 ===
California's 80th State Assembly district election, 1998
Party	Candidate	Votes	%
Republican	Jim Battin (incumbent)	52,823	55.48
Democratic	Joey Acuna, Jr.	38,892	40.84
Libertarian	Susan Marie Weber	3,504	2.68
Invalid or blank votes		5,826	5.77
Total votes		101,045	100.00
Republican hold			

== See also ==
- California State Senate
- California State Senate elections, 1998
- California State Assembly Districts
- California state elections, 1998
- Districts in California
- Political party strength in California
- Political party strength in U.S. states
