= Michael Sweeney (California politician) =

American politician

Michael Sweeny

Member of the California State Assembly from the 18th district
- In office December 5, 1994 - November 30, 1998
- Preceded by: Johan Klehs
- Succeeded by: Ellen Corbett

Personal details
- Born: October 30, 1950 (age 75) Oakland, California
- Party: Democratic
- Spouse: Maria Ochoa
- Education: California State University, Hayward

Michael Patrick Sweeney (born October 30, 1950) is an American Democratic Party politician who most recently served as mayor of Hayward, California, from 2006 to 2014. He served on the City Council starting in 1982, was reelected in 1986, and elected mayor for the first time in 1990.

Born in Oakland, California, Sweeney has a B.A. and M.A. in political science from California State University, Hayward. He was also the executive director of Spectrum Community Services, a nonprofit social service organization in Hayward. Sweeney previously served as representative for California's 18th State Assembly district as a Democrat, having been elected in 1994, and serving until 1998.

In August 2013, Sweeney announced he would not seek re-election in the 2014 California elections. His successor Barbara Halliday, took over as mayor in July 2014.
