= Ellen Corbett =

American politician (1954–2024)

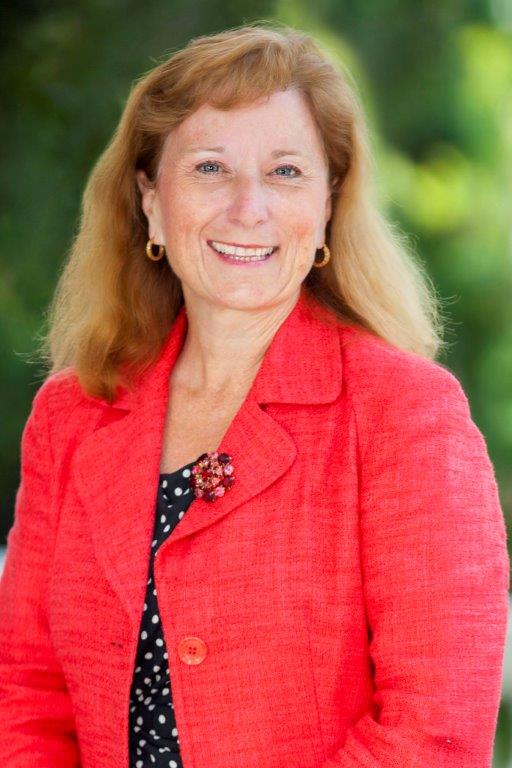
- Official portrait, 2013

Member of the California State Senate from the 10th district
- In office December 4, 2006 – November 30, 2014
- Preceded by: Liz Figueroa
- Succeeded by: Bob Wieckowski

Majority Leader of the California Senate
- In office December 6, 2010 – November 30, 2014
- Preceded by: Dean Florez
- Succeeded by: Bill Monning

Member of the California State Assembly from the 18th district
- In office December 7, 1998 – November 30, 2004
- Preceded by: Michael Sweeney
- Succeeded by: Johan Klehs

Mayor of San Leandro
- In office 1994–1998

Personal details
- Born: December 31, 1954 Oakland, California, U.S.
- Died: August 9, 2024 (aged 69)
- Party: Democratic
- Children: 1
- Education: University of California, Davis (BS); University of the Pacific (JD)

Ellen Marie Corbett (December 31, 1954 – August 9, 2024) was an American Democratic politician from the San Francisco Bay Area. She served in the California State Senate, representing the 10th District, which included San Leandro, Hayward, Pleasanton, Union City, Fremont, Newark, Milpitas, and part of San Jose. She was the Senate Majority Leader.

Ellen Corbett was elected to the California State Assembly in the 1998, and served there until 2004, when she was termed out. Previously, she served on the San Leandro City Council and was the first woman in the city's history directly elected as Mayor, serving as Mayor of San Leandro from 1994 to 1998. Corbett has also worked as an attorney, community college professor and civic activist. In 2016, Corbett was elected as a board member of the East Bay Regional Park District.

Corbett attended Chabot Community College and California State University, East Bay, earning a Bachelor of Science degree from the University of California, Davis and a Juris Doctor degree from McGeorge Law School.

== Senate 10th District ==
The 10th District encompasses the southern part of the East Bay, located directly south of California's 9th State Senate district. As such, it includes the southern half of Alameda County and a portion of Santa Clara County.

== 2011 redistricting ==
After redistricting in 2011 by the California Citizens Redistricting Commission, the new 10th district now includes 40.7% of Alameda County and 17.4% of Santa Clara County. Cities in the district include Fremont, Hayward, Milpitas, and Santa Clara. The new boundaries took effect for the 2014 election for the district, in which Corbett was ineligible to run in due to term limits.

== 2014 US Congressional elections ==
Corbett termed out of the State Senate seat in 2014. In February 2013, addressing the possibility of her running for Eric Swalwell's seat in the US House of Representatives 15th congressional district, Corbett said "I would be honored to serve in [the United States] Congress, but it's too early to discuss 2014."

After the 2013 legislative session, Corbett began campaigning against Swalwell, with the support of Pete Stark, whom Swalwell defeated in 2012. However, she finished in third place, missing a general election slot by 0.5% to Republican Hugh Bussell, a technology manager/educator from Livermore. Swalwell lead the primary with almost 50 percent of the vote, winning nearly 70 percent against Bussell in the November general election.

== Legislative positions ==
Corbett passed legislation to provide students with more information on student loan options, provide safeguards for car purchasers, and protect California homeowners who suffered during the nationwide housing crisis.

She received an 87% rating from Clean Water Action California in 2012, and a 99% lifetime rating from the California League of Conservation Voters.

Corbett publicly advocated for restoring of full funding to the Supplemental Nutrition Assistance Program in the 2012 U.S. Farm Bill, which had proposed cuts to the program.

== Legislative honors ==
In 2008, Corbett was named one of the Top 100 Attorneys in California and an Outstanding Legislator by the California State Sheriff's Association. She received honors from the California Labor Federation, the Consumer Federation of California, the American Cancer Society, the California Congress of Seniors, the Sierra Club of California, the Environmental Working Group, the California League of Conservation Voters, Clean Water Action California, and the Hindu American Foundation.

== Personal life and death ==
Corbett lived in San Leandro, California, and died August 9, 2024, at the age of 69.

California Assembly
Preceded by Michael Sweeney	California State Assembly, 18th District; December 7, 1998 – November 30, 2004	Succeeded by Johan Klehs
Political offices
Preceded by Darrell Steinberg	State Assembly Judiciary Committee Chairwoman; 2002–2004	Succeeded by Dave Jones
California Senate
Preceded by Liz Figueroa	California State Senate, 10th District; December 4, 2006 – November 30, 2014	Succeeded by Bob Wieckowski
