= Brad Sherman =

American politician (born 1954)

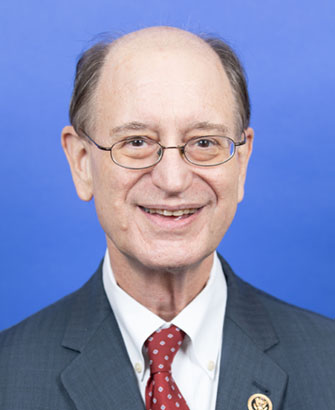
- Official portrait, 2022

Member of the U.S. House of Representatives from California
- Incumbent
- Assumed office January 3, 1997
- Preceded by: Anthony Beilenson
- Constituency: 24th district (1997–2003); 27th district (2003–2013); 30th district (2013–2023); 32nd district (2023–present)

Member of the California Board of Equalization
- In office January 7, 1991 – January 3, 1997
- Preceded by: Conway Collis
- Succeeded by: John Chiang
- Constituency: 2nd district (1991–1995); 4th district (1995–1997)

Personal details
- Born: Bradley James Sherman; October 24, 1954 (age 72) Los Angeles, California, U.S.
- Party: Democratic
- Spouse: Lisa Kaplan (m. 2006)
- Children: 3
- Education: University of California, Los Angeles (BA); Harvard University (JD)
- Website: House website Campaign website
- Sherman's voice Sherman supporting the UIGHUR Act of 2019. Recorded December 3, 2019

Bradley James Sherman (born October 24, 1954) is an American accountant and politician serving as the U.S. representative for California's 32nd congressional district. A member of the Democratic Party, he first entered Congress in 1997. Sherman represented California's 24th congressional district for three terms, California's 27th congressional district for five terms, and California's 30th congressional district for five terms. His district includes parts of the San Fernando Valley in Los Angeles County and Simi Valley in Ventura County.

== Early life, education, and early career ==
Sherman was born in Los Angeles, the son of Lane (from the Philadelphia area) and Maurice Hyman Sherman (from Indiana). His parents were both of Ukrainian Jewish descent. He attended Mark Keppel High School and Corona del Mar High School. He received a Bachelor of Arts in political science from the University of California, Los Angeles, in 1974, and a Juris Doctor from Harvard Law School in 1979. He is a Certified Public Accountant who worked at one of the nations' Big Four accounting firms. As part of his work there, he helped represent the Philippine government under Corazon Aquino in a successful effort to seize assets of deposed president Ferdinand Marcos. Sherman was an instructor at Harvard Law School's International Tax Program.

=== Board of Equalization (1991–1997) ===
Sherman served on the California State Board of Equalization from 1991 to 1997. He chaired the Board from 1991 to 1995.

The 1990 campaign for the Board seat involved numerous attacks. Claude Parrish, Sherman's Republican opponent, said that Arlo Smith, the (ultimately unsuccessful) Democratic nominee for attorney general, had declined to endorse Sherman for the Board seat. Sherman called it "one of the most outrageous hit pieces in contemporary California political history".

In turn, Sherman claimed that Parrish's ice cream company had been shut down in 1985 for failure to pay state income taxes. However, Parrish said that he had actually sold the company in 1983, just before its business license was suspended for a month by the state Franchise Tax Board. Sherman said that he relied on public records in making his allegations. Besides, Sherman said, the 1983 suspension could only have occurred because of previous tax delinquencies.

Sherman was re-elected to the Board of Equalization in 1994, but resigned in January 1997 to be sworn in to Congress.

== U.S. House of Representatives ==
=== Elections ===
In 1994, incumbent Democratic U.S. representative Anthony C. Beilenson of California's 24th congressional district barely survived the Republican Revolution, winning re-election by a two-point margin, by far the worst election performance of his career. In 1996, Beilenson decided to retire.

Sherman then ran for the seat, and won the seven-candidate Democratic primary with 54% of the vote. In the general election, he defeated Republican nominee Rich Sybert (also the 1994 nominee), 49%–44%. He has not faced another contest nearly that close since. In 1998, he was reelected with 57% of the vote. Since then, he has been reelected every two years with at least 62%.

2012

Redistricting following the 2010 census drew the homes of Sherman and fellow Democrat Howard Berman, who had previously represented the 28th district, into the 30th district. The redrawn 30th was more Sherman's district than Berman's; Sherman retained about 60% of his former territory, while Berman kept 20% of his former voters. On June 5, 2012, Sherman faced Berman in the primary for the 30th district. Sherman finished first, leading 42% to 32%. Under California's new election system, which put the two candidates who received the most votes in the primary against each other, regardless of party, the two faced each other again in the general election. Neither candidate was endorsed by the state Democratic Party.

Berman was the more established candidate. He was endorsed by over 20 congressmen, including party leaders Steny Hoyer and Xavier Becerra, sitting Governor Jerry Brown, sitting Los Angeles Mayor Antonio Villaraigosa, and the state's two U.S. senators, Barbara Boxer and Dianne Feinstein. He was endorsed by ten Republican congressmen from California: David Dreier, Wally Herger, Dan Lungren, Elton Gallegly, Buck McKeon, Ed Royce, Jerry Lewis, Ken Calvert, Mary Bono Mack, and Darrell Issa. He was endorsed by two Republican U.S. senators, John McCain and Lindsey Graham, and by Independent U.S. senator Joe Lieberman. Sherman was endorsed by then-lieutenant governor (and future governor) Gavin Newsom, former president Bill Clinton, and former Massachusetts governor Michael Dukakis.

In the general election, Sherman defeated Berman, 60%–40%.

=== Tenure ===
First elected to the House of Representatives in 1996, Sherman is serving his 12th term in Congress. He is a senior member of the House Foreign Affairs Committee. Sherman has held over 160 Town Hall meetings since being elected to Congress.

Sherman voted with President Joe Biden's stated position 100% of the time in the 117th Congress, according to a FiveThirtyEight analysis.

Sherman in November 2026

Sherman's voting record has most often earned him a 100% rating from the American Federation of Labor and Congress of Industrial Organizations (AFL–CIO), the Service Employees International Union (SEIU), and the American Federation of State, County, & Municipal Employees (AFSCME). Sherman's voting record has earned him a 100% rating in 2004 from the Humane Society. In 2017 and 2018, the Animal Welfare Institute gave Sherman a rating of 68%. Sherman's legislative record received a 100% rating from the American Civil Liberties Union (ACLU) in 2011, a 100% from the National Organization for Women (NOW) in 2007–08, a 100% from the Human Rights Campaign in 2009–10, and a 98% rating from the National Association for the Advancement of Colored People (NAACP) in 2009–10. Sherman has earned a 100% rating from the National Education Association, and the American Federation of Teachers.

==== Office environment ====
In December 2017, eight former aides to Sherman said that his offices in Washington, D. C., and California had a toxic environment characterized by frequent "verbal abuse from the congressman and senior staff who made them feel bullied and demoralized". A focus of the criticism was Matt Dababneh, Sherman's district director and a close advisor, who began working for Sherman in 2005 and became district director to Sherman in 2009. Dababneh was elected to the California State Assembly in 2013 and resigned from that body after allegations of sexual assault and other misconduct were made against him. Former employees in Sherman's office told the Los Angeles Times that Dababneh frequently made inappropriate sexual remarks, including degrading and sexist comments and bragged about his sexual exploits. Although they did not suggest that Sherman knew of Dababneh's conduct, several staffers said the office environment did not encourage reporting and that Sherman would not have been receptive to complaints about a trusted advisor.

Sherman has acknowledged being "a demanding boss" but "denied that his management style contributed to the silence about Dababneh's behavior". Surveys of Capitol Hill staff rated Sherman as one of the worst members of Congress to work for with high staff turnover rates.

In January 2018, Sherman held a town hall meeting in Reseda, where a questioner who supported a Democratic primary challenger to Sherman accused Sherman of having an inadequate sexual harassment policy. Sherman replied: "We have five different ways to report sexual harassment in my office. One among those is to talk to me personally. And I talk to each staff member several times a year about the office policy." The exchange was cut from a video of the event that Sherman's office posted to YouTube; the office said that it excluded from the highlight reel "all questions asked by a questioner working with an opponent's campaign if the questioner failed to disclose that fact in their question".

== Political positions ==
=== Abortion ===
Sherman is pro-choice. Sherman opposed the overturning of Roe v. Wade, calling it "appalling and outrageous".

=== Cryptocurrency ===
Sherman has been a strong opponent of cryptocurrency, and has advocated for banning cryptocurrency in the United States, citing concerns about crime and national security.

=== Donald Trump ===
On July 12, 2017, Sherman introduced an Article of Impeachment (H. Res. 438) against President Donald Trump for High Crimes and Misdemeanors on the grounds that Trump attempted to obstruct justice by firing James Comey from the FBI. Sherman had only one co-sponsor, Al Green, who first called for Trump's impeachment in May 2017.

=== Economic policy ===
During the debate over the Emergency Economic Stabilization Act of 2008, Sherman was an early and outspoken critic of the proposal, leading the House revolt against the bill, a move that made him "spectacularly unpopular with both the Republican and Democratic leaderships, not to mention K Street". He argued that Bush and his advisors had created a panic atmosphere in an effort to get lawmakers to rubber-stamp the bill.

Sherman opposed the North American Free Trade Agreement (NAFTA) and the Central American Free Trade Agreement (CAFTA), arguing that they cost American jobs, fail to protect foreign workers, harm the environment, and cost U.S. taxpayers billions of dollars. He has also opposed a Free Trade Agreement with South Korea, arguing that such an agreement could undermine U.S. security and economic interests by benefiting China and North Korea.

In 2026, Sherman introduced the Iran War Oil Crisis Windfall Profits Tax Act, which would levy a 100% windfall tax on the amount by which crude oil prices exceed $75 per barrel during the 2026 Iran war.

=== Environment ===
Serving on the House Budget Committee in 1997, Sherman authored the Sherman Amendment to the Budget Resolution, providing an additional $700 million for the acquisition of environmentally important lands in FY 1998.

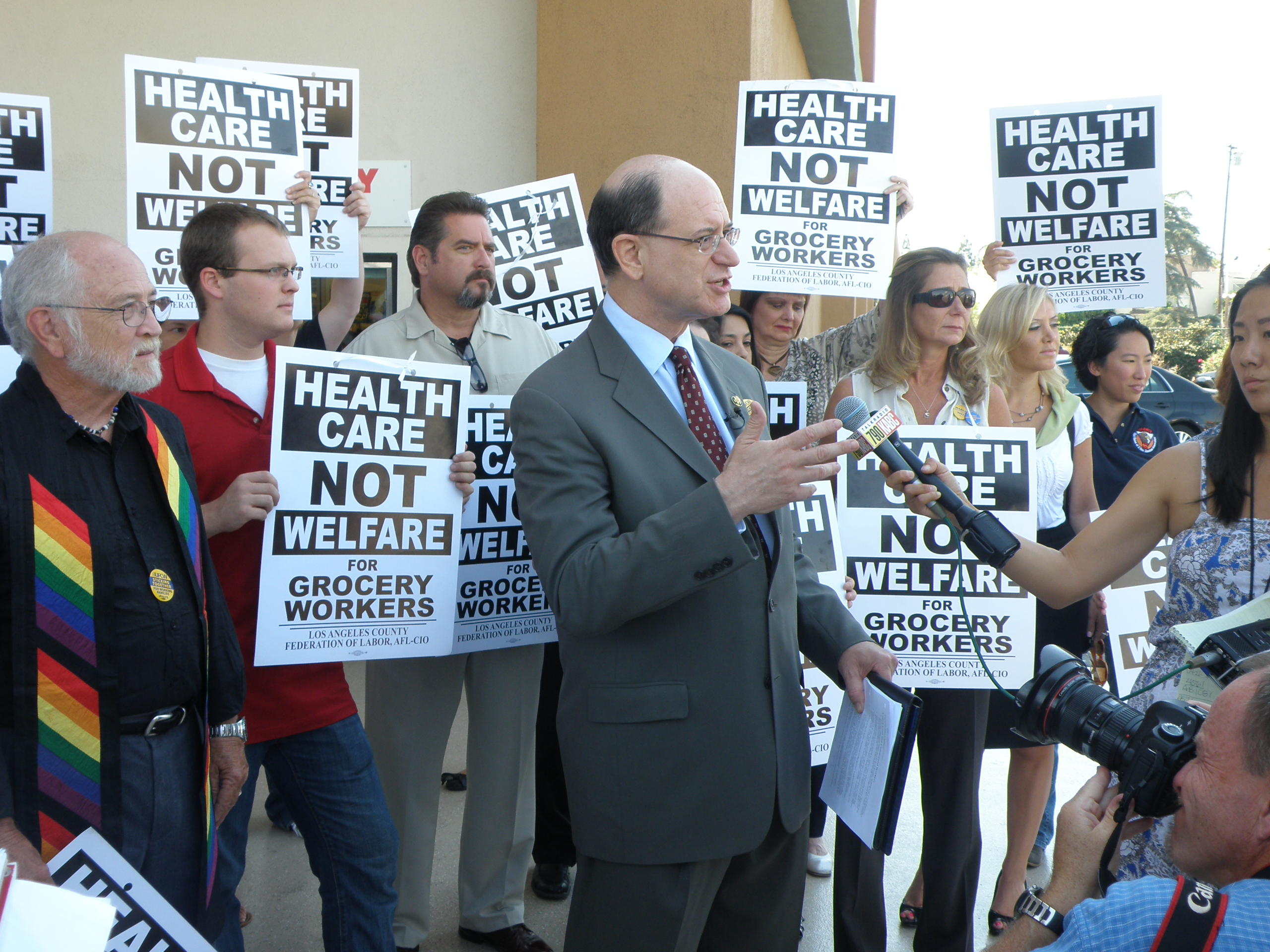
Congressman Brad Sherman joins with members of United Food and Commercial Workers (UFCW) at a local supermarket in Sherman Oaks

=== Foreign policy ===
In August 2010, Sherman introduced legislation aimed at rescinding China's Most Favored Nation status as long as there was not "a more level playing field between our two nations". He said, "the U.S.-China trade relationship is horrendously lopsided".

Sherman has introduced or co-sponsored more than 20 bills in the 111th and 112th Congresses that he says "enact tougher sanctions to isolate Iran economically and diplomatically". His efforts have included legislation designed to close loopholes for U.S. companies with subsidiaries operating in Iran, and to curtail U.S. funding of international organizations providing loans to Iran.

Sherman has been a strong supporter and advocate of the U.S-Israel relationship, consistently supporting aid to Israel. In 2016, he called the American Israel Public Affairs Committee (AIPAC), Washington's chief pro-Israel lobbying and advocacy organization, "the single most important organization in promoting the U.S.-Israel alliance". In 2004, Sherman first introduced the U.S.-Israel Energy Cooperation Act. It provides grants to joint ventures between American and Israeli academics and private companies that conduct research and develop energy-efficient and renewable energy technologies.

On July 9, 2014, Sherman appeared as a guest commentator on the Al Jazeera America's network. During his appearance, he criticized the network's Qatar-based owners for funding Hamas. Sherman said: "Every one of those rockets [fired by Hamas into Israeli cities] is a war crime, almost every one. Of course it's a war crime committed by Hamas. And of course the owners of this TV network help fund Hamas." Sherman emphasized that Hamas often aims attacks at civilian targets. The Qatari government owns Al Jazeera.

In December 2014, Sherman and Representative Pete Roskam requested new sanctions on Qatar in a letter to Secretary of Treasury Jack Lew. They also asked for a detailed accounting of public and private financing from within Qatar for Hamas, Al-Qaeda, the Islamic State, and the al-Nusra Front.

Sherman and other pro-Israel members of Congress have introduced legislation to allow Israel to be part of the visa waiver program. The legislation failed because the Israeli government was unwilling to grant reciprocal visa-free travel for all U.S. citizens.

As a senior member of the House Committee on Foreign Affairs, Sherman has focused on Congressional recognition of the Armenian genocide, as well as increasing funding to Armenia and Nagorno-Karabakh, which is part of Azerbaijan, but was under the control of the Republic of Artsakh from 1994 until 2023. He called for the imposition of sanctions against Azerbaijan.

Sherman urged the Trump administration to take a tougher line on China by imposing sanctions on Chinese officials who are responsible for human rights abuses against the Uyghur Muslim minority in China's Xinjiang region. In March 2019, Sherman and other lawmakers wrote Secretary of State Mike Pompeo a letter that read in part, "This issue is bigger than just China. It is about demonstrating to strongmen globally that the world will hold them accountable for their actions."

=== Housing ===
Sherman introduced the Preserving Equal Access to Mortgage Finance Programs Act (HR 1754), which raises the conforming loan limit for FHA loans in high-cost areas such as Sherman's district.

=== Internet ===
In 2011, Sherman co-sponsored SOPA, a controversial copyright bill. His 2012 opponent, Howard Berman, was an original co-sponsor of SOPA.

=== LGBT issues ===
Sherman strongly supports LGBT rights. Sherman is a member of the LGBT Equality Caucus and supports same-sex marriage. He voted for the Don't Ask, Don't Tell Repeal Act of 2010. Sherman was an original co-sponsor of Representative Jared Polis's Student Non-Discrimination Act. Sherman is also a co-sponsor of the Employment Non-Discrimination Act. In 2009, he voted for the Matthew Shepard and James Byrd, Jr., Hate Crimes Prevention Act, which imposes additional federal penalties for crimes motivated by hatred on the basis of race, religion, or actual or perceived sexual orientation.

=== Social Security and health care ===
Sherman has said he is "opposed to creating a voucher system for Medicare". He wants to avoid "turn[ing] Social Security into a welfare program", instead keeping it "for people who contribute to it". He supports the Patient Protection and Affordable Care Act. Sherman helped secure funds to develop a new women's and children's patient wing at El Proyecto del Barrio's Family Health Care Clinic in Winnetka.

=== Transportation ===
He has introduced legislation to implement a mandatory nighttime curfew at Bob Hope Airport to reduce airport noise in the San Fernando Valley.

In 2022, Sherman expressed concern about the construction of an underground metro line connecting San Fernando Valley with the influent neighborhood of Westside. Sherman asked the LA Metro to listen to concerns by prominent Westside residents, such as Fred Rosen and the Bel Air Association Metro Committee. In his letter to LA Metro, Sherman argued that a subway station would not useful in Westside because students at University of California, Los Angeles (which is located in Westside) do not like using the subway.

=== Wildfires ===
Sherman, whose district includes Pacific Palisades, an area heavily impacted by the wildfires that destroyed thousands of homes, engaged in a heated exchange on January 24, 2025, during President Donald Trump's meeting with local, state and congressional leaders following the tour of devastation. Sherman informed Trump that many people affected by the fires had their insurance canceled and urged him to support substantial federal funding for rebuilding programs. However, Sherman also criticized Trump's earlier comments about tying such funding to requirements like Voter ID. The Palisades Fire started January 7 and burned more than 23,000 acres, killing at least 12 people and destroying more than 6,800 structures.

Sherman expressed his support for relief funding in states like Louisiana and North Dakota, even though he disagrees with some of their political policies. "I would never tell someone in Louisiana to keep living on their cousin's couch because we won't help them rebuild until the state aligns with my views on a woman's right to choose," Sherman said. "I'm hoping we can secure these funds and avoid punishing individuals for the policies of their state." Sherman also urged Trump to consider delaying tariffs on construction materials for three years to allow rebuilding efforts to move forward without unnecessary obstacles. Trump responded that he would "take a look" at the proposal.

=== Committee assignments ===
For the 119th Congress:

- Committee on Financial Services
  - Subcommittee on Capital Markets (Ranking Member)
  - Subcommittee on Digital Assets, Financial Technology, and Inclusion
  - Subcommittee on Financial Institutions and Monetary Policy
- Committee on Foreign Affairs
  - Subcommittee on East Asia and Pacific
  - Subcommittee on the Middle East, North Africa, and Central Asia

=== Caucus memberships ===
- Congressional Progressive Caucus
- Congressional Equality Caucus
- Israel Allies Caucus (co-chair)
- Congressional Sindh Caucus (chair)
- House Baltic Caucus
- Congressional Arts Caucus
- Congressional Asian Pacific American Caucus
- Congressional Coalition on Adoption
- Congressional Ukraine Caucus
- Congressional Taiwan Caucus

== Personal life ==
Sherman is Jewish. On December 3, 2006, Sherman married Lisa Nicola Kaplan, a foreign affairs officer for the U.S. State Department. The couple has three daughters: Molly Hannah (b. 2009), Naomi Claire (b. 2010), and Lucy Rayna (b. 2011).

== Electoral history ==
=== California State Board of Equalization ===
California BOE election, 1990: District 2
Primary election
| Party | Candidate | Votes | % |
|---|---|---|---|
| Democratic | Brad Sherman | 280,212 | 50.89 |
| Democratic | Joseph Colman | 92,017 | 16.71 |
| Democratic | Louis John Papan | 73,428 | 13.34 |
| Democratic | Tom Baldwin | 52,793 | 9.59 |
| Democratic | Emil Pollak | 31,182 | 5.70 |
| Democratic | Edward Tabash | 20,768 | 3.77 |
| Total votes | | 550,400 | 100 |
General election
| Democratic | Brad Sherman | 898,820 | 51.12 |
| Republican | Claude Parrish | 682,240 | 38.81 |
| Peace and Freedom | Nancy Lawrence | 75,575 | 4.30 |
| Libertarian | Lyn Sapwosky-Smith | 60,794 | 3.46 |
| American Independent | Nicholas Kudrovzeff | 40,563 | 2.31 |
| Total votes | | 1,757,992 | 100 |
| Democratic hold | | | |

California BOE election, 1994: District 4
Primary election
| Party | Candidate | Votes | % |
|---|---|---|---|
| Democratic | Brad Sherman (incumbent) | 176,988 | 42.80 |
| Democratic | Albert Robles | 67,946 | 16.43 |
| Democratic | Al Koch | 64,535 | 15.61 |
| Democratic | Glanda Sherman | 53,305 | 12.89 |
| Democratic | Jerome Edgar Horton | 30,152 | 7.29 |
| Democratic | David Elder | 20,622 | 4.99 |
| Total votes | | 413,548 | 100 |
General election
| Democratic | Brad Sherman (incumbent) | 802,427 | 53.83 |
| Republican | Ernie Dynda | 540,411 | 36.26 |
| Peace and Freedom | Shirley Rachel Isaacson | 83,535 | 5.60 |
| Libertarian | Lawrence Goldberg | 64,185 | 4.31 |
| Total votes | | 1,490,558 | 100 |
| Democratic hold | | | |

=== United States House of Representatives ===
US House election, 1996: California District 24
Primary election
| Party | Candidate | Votes | % |
|---|---|---|---|
| Democratic | Brad Sherman | 27,513 | 53.73 |
| Democratic | Elizabeth Knipe | 7,580 | 14.80 |
| Democratic | Jeffrey Lipow | 5,360 | 10.47 |
| Democratic | Michael Jordan | 4,786 | 9.35 |
| Democratic | Craig Freis | 2,540 | 4.96 |
| Democratic | Mark Pash | 1,774 | 3.46 |
| Democratic | Elisa Charouhas | 1,650 | 3.22 |
| Total votes | | 51,203 | 100 |
General election
| Democratic | Brad Sherman | 106,193 | 49.43 |
| Republican | Rich Sybert | 93,629 | 43.58 |
| Peace and Freedom | Ralph Shroyer | 6,267 | 2.92 |
| Libertarian | Erich Miller | 5,691 | 2.65 |
| Natural Law | Ron Lawrence | 3,068 | 1.43 |
| Total votes | | 214,848 | 100 |
| Democratic hold | | | |

US House election, 1998: California District 24
| Party | Candidate | Votes | % |
|---|---|---|---|
| Democratic | Brad Sherman (incumbent) | 103,491 | 57.31 |
| Republican | Randy Hoffman | 69,501 | 38.49 |
| Natural Law | Catherine Carter | 3,033 | 1.68 |
| Libertarian | Erich Miller | 2,695 | 1.49 |
| Peace and Freedom | Ralph Shroyer | 1,860 | 1.03 |
| Total votes | | 180,580 | 100 |
| Democratic hold | | | |

US House election, 2000: California District 24
| Party | Candidate | Votes | % |
|---|---|---|---|
| Democratic | Brad Sherman (incumbent) | 155,398 | 66.00 |
| Republican | Jerry Doyle | 70,169 | 29.80 |
| Libertarian | Juan Carlos Ros | 6,966 | 2.96 |
| Natural Law | Michael Cuddehe | 2,911 | 1.24 |
| Total votes | | 235,444 | 100 |
| Democratic hold | | | |

US House election, 2002: California District 27
| Party | Candidate | Votes | % |
|---|---|---|---|
| Democratic | Brad Sherman (incumbent) | 79,815 | 61.96 |
| Republican | Robert Levy | 48,996 | 38.04 |
| Total votes | | 128,811 | 100 |
| Democratic hold | | | |

US House election, 2004: California District 27
| Party | Candidate | Votes | % |
|---|---|---|---|
| Democratic | Brad Sherman (incumbent) | 125,296 | 62.27 |
| Republican | Robert Levy | 66,946 | 33.27 |
| Green | Eric Carter | 8,956 | 4.45 |
| Total votes | | 201,198 | 100 |
| Democratic hold | | | |

US House election, 2006: California District 27
| Party | Candidate | Votes | % |
|---|---|---|---|
| Democratic | Brad Sherman (incumbent) | 92,650 | 68.77 |
| Republican | Peter Hankwitz | 42,074 | 31.23 |
| Total votes | | 134,724 | 100 |
| Democratic hold | | | |

US House election, 2008: California District 27
| Party | Candidate | Votes | % |
|---|---|---|---|
| Democratic | Brad Sherman (incumbent) | 145,812 | 68.51 |
| Republican | Navraj Singh | 52,852 | 24.83 |
| Libertarian | Tim Denton | 14,171 | 6.66 |
| Total votes | | 212,835 | 100 |
| Democratic hold | | | |

US House election, 2010: California District 27
| Party | Candidate | Votes | % |
|---|---|---|---|
| Democratic | Brad Sherman (incumbent) | 102,927 | 65.15 |
| Republican | Mark Reed | 55,056 | 34.85 |
| Total votes | | 157,983 | 100 |
| Democratic hold | | | |

US House election, 2012: California District 30
Primary election
| Party | Candidate | Votes | % |
|---|---|---|---|
| Democratic | Brad Sherman (incumbent) | 40,589 | 42.35 |
| Democratic | Howard Berman (incumbent) | 31,086 | 32.44 |
| Republican | Mark Reed | 11,991 | 12.51 |
| Republican | Navraj Singh | 5,521 | 5.76 |
| Republican | Susan Shelley | 3,878 | 4.05 |
| Green | Michael Powelson | 1,976 | 2.06 |
| Democratic | Vince Gilmore | 792 | 0.83 |
| Total votes | | 95,833 | 100 |
General election
| Democratic | Brad Sherman (incumbent) | 149,456 | 60.30 |
| Democratic | Howard Berman (incumbent) | 98,395 | 39.70 |
| Total votes | | 247,851 | 100 |
| Democratic hold | | | |

US House election, 2014: California District 30
Primary election
| Party | Candidate | Votes | % |
|---|---|---|---|
| Democratic | Brad Sherman (incumbent) | 40,787 | 57.93 |
| Republican | Mark Reed | 14,129 | 20.07 |
| Republican | Pablo Kleinman | 8,808 | 12.51 |
| Democratic | Marc Litchman | 4,251 | 6.04 |
| Green | Michael Powelson | 2,352 | 3.34 |
| Write-in | | 76 | 0.11 |
| Total votes | | 70,403 | 100 |
General election
| Democratic | Brad Sherman (incumbent) | 86,568 | 65.64 |
| Republican | Mark Reed | 45,315 | 34.36 |
| Total votes | | 131,883 | 100 |
| Democratic hold | | | |

US House election, 2016: California District 30
Primary election
| Party | Candidate | Votes | % |
|---|---|---|---|
| Democratic | Brad Sherman (incumbent) | 92,448 | 60.11 |
| Republican | Mark Reed | 21,458 | 13.95 |
| Democratic | Patrea Patrick | 14,628 | 9.51 |
| Democratic | Raji Rab | 8,847 | 5.75 |
| Republican | Navraj Singh | 6,517 | 4.24 |
| Democratic | Luke Davis | 5,150 | 3.35 |
| Republican | Christopher David Townsend | 4,741 | 3.08 |
| Total votes | | 153,789 | 100 |
General election
| Democratic | Brad Sherman (incumbent) | 205,279 | 72.64 |
| Republican | Mark Reed | 77,325 | 27.36 |
| Total votes | | 282,604 | 100 |
| Democratic hold | | | |

US House election, 2018: California District 30
Primary election
| Party | Candidate | Votes | % |
|---|---|---|---|
| Democratic | Brad Sherman (incumbent) | 80,038 | 62.30 |
| Republican | Mark Reed | 35,046 | 27.28 |
| Democratic | Raji Rab | 6,753 | 5.26 |
| Democratic | Jon Pelzer | 6,642 | 5.17 |
| Total votes | | 128,479 | 100 |
General election
| Democratic | Brad Sherman (incumbent) | 191,573 | 73.40 |
| Republican | Mark Reed | 69,420 | 26.60 |
| Total votes | | 260,993 | 100 |
| Democratic hold | | | |

US House election, 2020: California District 30
Primary election
| Party | Candidate | Votes | % |
|---|---|---|---|
| Democratic | Brad Sherman (incumbent) | 99,282 | 58.08 |
| Republican | Mark Reed | 38,778 | 22.68 |
| Democratic | Courtney "CJ" Berina | 18,937 | 11.08 |
| Democratic | Raji Rab | 7,961 | 4.66 |
| Democratic | Brian T. Carroll | 5,984 | 3.50 |
| Total votes | | 170,942 | 100 |
General election
| Democratic | Brad Sherman (incumbent) | 240,038 | 69.48 |
| Republican | Mark Reed | 105,426 | 30.52 |
| Total votes | | 345,464 | 100 |
| Democratic hold | | | |

US House election, 2022: California District 32
Primary election
| Party | Candidate | Votes | % |
|---|---|---|---|
| Democratic | Brad Sherman (incumbent) | 88,063 | 53.70 |
| Republican | Lucie Volotzky | 32,342 | 19.72 |
| Democratic | Shervin Aazami | 15,036 | 9.17 |
| Republican | Melissa Toomim | 13,926 | 8.49 |
| Democratic | Aarika Samone Rhodes | 8,744 | 5.33 |
| Democratic | Jason Potell | 2,943 | 1.79 |
| Democratic | Raji Rab | 2,938 | 1.79 |
| Total votes | | 163,992 | 100 |
General election
| Democratic | Brad Sherman (incumbent) | 167,411 | 69.17 |
| Republican | Lucie Volotzky | 74,618 | 30.83 |
| Total votes | | 242,029 | 100 |
| Democratic hold | | | |

US House election, 2024: California District 32
Primary election
| Party | Candidate | Votes | % |
|---|---|---|---|
| Democratic | Brad Sherman (incumbent) | 91,952 | 58.59 |
| Republican | Larry Thompson | 29,939 | 19.08 |
| Republican | James Shuster | 16,601 | 10.58 |
| Democratic | Christopher Ahuja | 12,637 | 8.05 |
| Democratic | Douglas Smith | 2,504 | 1.60 |
| Democratic | David Abbitt | 1,665 | 1.06 |
| Democratic | Trevor Witt | 1,635 | 1.04 |
| Total votes | | 156,933 | 100 |
General election
| Democratic | Brad Sherman (incumbent) | 212,934 | 66.20 |
| Republican | Larry Thompson | 108,711 | 33.80 |
| Total votes | | 321,645 | 100 |
| Democratic hold | | | |

US House election, 2026: California District 32
Primary election
| Party | Candidate | Votes | % |
|---|---|---|---|
| Democratic | Brad Sherman (incumbent) | 76,755 | 36.77 |
| Republican | Larry Thompson | 68,295 | 32.72 |
| Democratic | Jake Levine | 31,688 | 15.18 |
| Democratic | Marena Lin | 13,215 | 6.33 |
| Democratic | Christopher Ahuja | 8,718 | 4.18 |
| Democratic | Anna Wilding | 4,288 | 2.05 |
| Democratic | Dory Benami | 2,283 | 1.09 |
| Democratic | Josh Sautter | 2,017 | 0.97 |
| No party preference | Doug Smith | 1,458 | 0.70 |
| Total votes | | 208,717 | 100 |

== See also ==
- List of Jewish members of the United States Congress

Political offices
| Preceded by Conway Collis | Member of the California Board of Equalization from the 4th district 1991–1997 | Succeeded by John Chiang |
U.S. House of Representatives
| Preceded by Anthony Beilenson | Member of the U.S. House of Representatives from California's 24th congressional district 1997–2003 | Succeeded by Elton Gallegly |
| Preceded by Adam Schiff | Member of the U.S. House of Representatives from California's 27th congressional district 2003–2013 | Succeeded by Judy Chu |
| Preceded by Henry Waxman | Member of the U.S. House of Representatives from California's 30th congressional district 2013–2023 | Succeeded by Adam Schiff |
| Preceded by Grace Napolitano | Member of the U.S. House of Representatives from California's 32nd congressional district 2023–present | Incumbent |
U.S. order of precedence (ceremonial)
| Preceded by Jim McGovern | United States representatives by seniority 24th | Succeeded by Adam Smith |
| Preceded by Robert Aderholt | Order of precedence of the United States | Succeeded by Diana DeGette |
