= Bill Leonard (politician) =

American politician

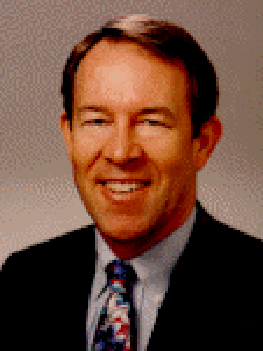

Member of the California State Board of Equalization from the 2nd District
- In office January 6, 2003 – March 10, 2010
- Governor: Gray Davis; Arnold Schwarzenegger
- Preceded by: Dean Andal
- Succeeded by: Barbara Alby

Minority Leader of the California Assembly
- In office June 17, 1997 – November 5, 1998
- Preceded by: Curt Pringle
- Succeeded by: Rod Pacheco

Member of the California State Assembly
- In office December 2, 1996 – November 30, 2002
- Preceded by: Jim Brulte
- Succeeded by: Robert Dutton
- Constituency: 63rd
- In office December 6, 1982 – November 30, 1988
- Preceded by: Dick Mountjoy
- Succeeded by: Paul A. Woodruff
- Constituency: 61st district
- In office December 4, 1978 – November 30, 1982
- Preceded by: Jerry Lewis
- Succeeded by: John Lewis
- Constituency: 67th district

Member of the California State Senate
- In office December 7, 1992 – November 30, 1996
- Preceded by: Frank Hill
- Succeeded by: Jim Brulte
- Constituency: 31st district
- In office December 5, 1988 – November 30, 1992
- Preceded by: H. L. Richardson
- Succeeded by: Teresa Patterson Hughes
- Constituency: 25th district

Personal details
- Born: October 29, 1947 (age 78) San Bernardino, California, US
- Party: Republican
- Spouse: Sherry Boldizsar
- Children: 3
- Education: University of California, Irvine

William R. Leonard (born October 29, 1947) is a Republican U.S. politician who served as a member of the California State Board of Equalization from 2002 until his resignation in March 2010.

== Early life ==
After earning his B.A. in history from the University of California, Irvine, Leonard worked in real estate and property management.

== Political career ==
Leonard served on the Board of Directors of the San Bernardino Valley Municipal Water District before being elected to the California State Assembly in 1978 on the coattails of Proposition 13.

In 1988, after serving five terms in the Assembly, he was elected to the California State Senate, representing an 11,000-square-mile (28,000 km^{2}) district. During his time in the Senate, Leonard was the longest-serving Republican Caucus Chairman, holding the post from 1990 until term limits forced him to leave the Senate in 1996.

During his time in the Senate, Leonard wrote California's Leonard Law, the only law in the United States to extend First Amendment rights to students at private colleges and universities.

In 1996, by a margin of 63%–37%, voters returned Leonard to the Assembly, where he served as Republican Leader from 1997 to 1998. He was re-elected in 1998 with 72% of the vote and in 2000 with 58% of the vote in a three-way race.

After term limits forced Leonard to leave the Assembly in 2002, he won election to represent the Second District on the five-member State Board of Equalization with 59% of the vote. He was re-elected in 2006 with 55.8% of the vote.

Leonard resigned from the State Board of Equalization in March 2010 in order to join Governor Arnold Schwarzenegger's administration as head of the California State and Consumer Services Agency.

California Assembly
Preceded by Jerry Lewis	California State Assemblyman; 67th District; December 4, 1978 - November 30, 1982	Succeeded by John R. Lewis
Preceded by Dick Mountjoy	California State Assemblyman; 61st District; December 6, 1982 - November 30, 1988	Succeeded by Paul A. Woodruff
Preceded by Jim Brulte	California State Assemblyman; 63rd District; December 2, 1996 - November 30, 2002	Succeeded by Robert Dutton
California Senate
Preceded by H. L. Richardson	California State Senator; 31st District; December 7, 1992 - November 30, 1996	Succeeded by Jim Brulte
Party political offices
Preceded by Curt Pringle	Minority Leader of the California State Assembly; June 17, 1997 – November 5, 1998	Succeeded by Rod Pacheco
Political offices
Preceded by Dean Andal	California State Board of Equalization Member; 2nd District; January 6, 2003 – March 10, 2010	Succeeded by Barbara Alby
