= Paul B. Carpenter =

American politician (1928–2002)

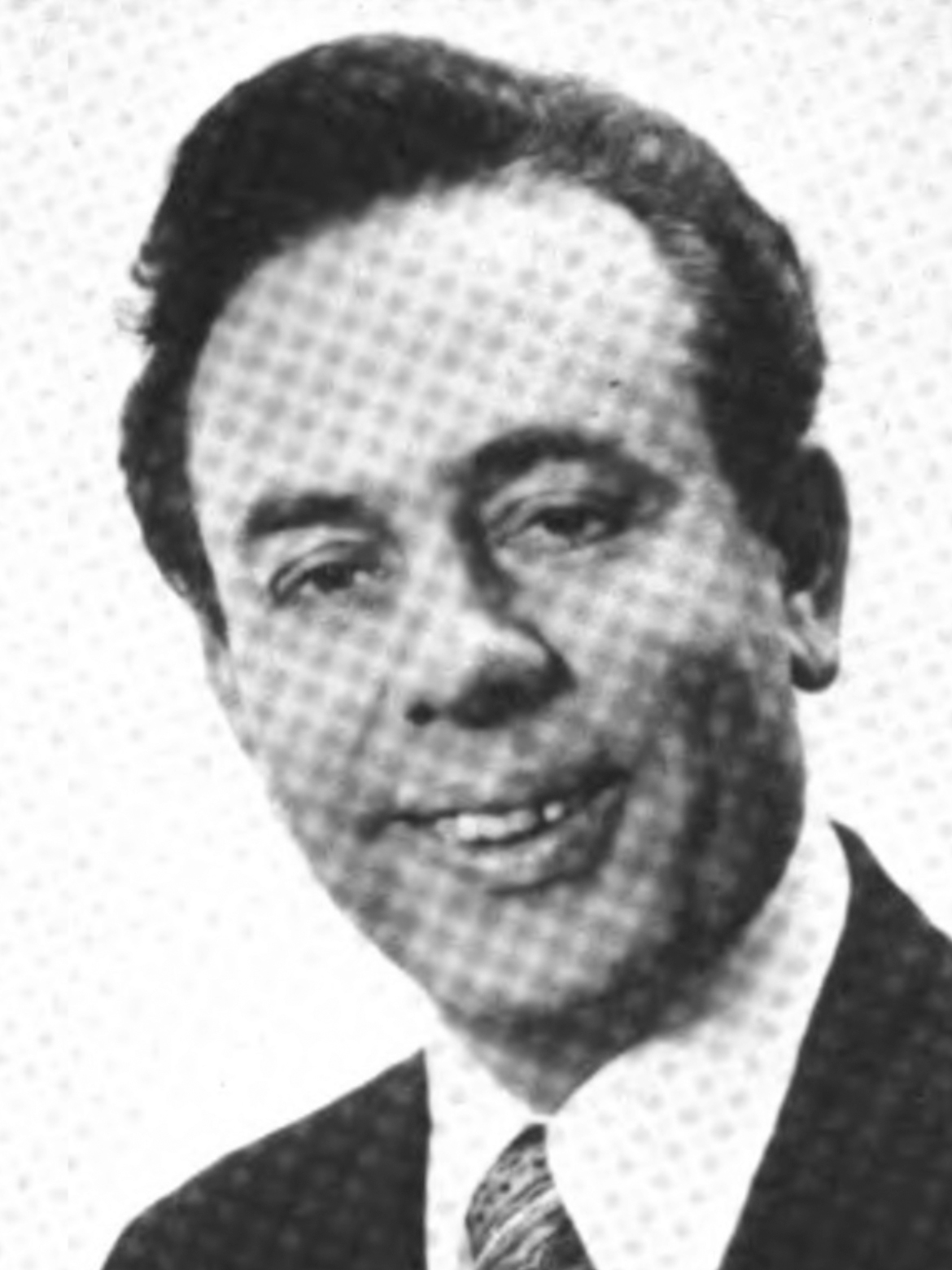
- Official portrait, 1975

Member of the California Board of Equalization
- In office 1987–1990

Member of the California State Senate
- In office December 6, 1976 – January 5, 1987
- Preceded by: George Deukmejian
- Succeeded by: Cecil Green
- Constituency: 37th district (1976–1984); 33rd district (1984–1987)

Member of the California State Assembly from the 71st district
- In office December 2, 1974 – November 30, 1976
- Preceded by: Robert Badham
- Succeeded by: Chester B. Wray

Personal details
- Born: Paul Bruce Carpenter; February 24, 1928 Sioux City, Iowa, U.S.
- Died: January 24, 2002 (aged 73) San Antonio, Texas, U.S.
- Party: Democratic
- Children: 1 [a daughter] (missing, presumed murdered)
- Education: Florida State University (PhD)

Military service
- Branch/service: United States Navy

Paul Bruce Carpenter (February 24, 1928 – January 24, 2002) was an American psychologist and politician.

== Early life ==
Born in Sioux City, Iowa, Carpenter attended the University of Iowa and received a doctorate degree in experimental psychology from Florida State University. He moved to Orange County, California in 1960 and worked as a psychologist.

== Political career ==
He was involved with the Democratic Party. From 1974 to 1976, Carpenter served in the California State Assembly. He then served in the California State Senate from 1976 to 1986. In 1982, Carpenter ran for the Democratic Party nomination for U.S. Senate but lost to then-governor Jerry Brown. Carpenter also served on the California Board of Equalization from 1987 to 1990. Despite being convicted of corruption charges in 1990, he won re-election to the board but was barred from serving because of the conviction.

Carpenter chaired his Senate caucus election fund-raising work from 1980 to 1985, which led to accusations of corruption. In 1990, Carpenter was convicted of racketeering, conspiracy and extortion as part of the BRISPEC sting operation. He fled to Costa Rica before sentencing, claiming it was for prostate cancer treatment and was subsequently extradited to the United States. He served a prison term from 1995 until 1999.

== Later life ==
Carpenter's only child, Jana Carpenter-Koklich (born January 1, 1960), went missing from her home in Lakewood, California in August 2001 and has never been found. Her husband Bruce Koklich was convicted of her murder in 2004, incarcerated for 15 years to life; in 2023, Koklich was denied parole for a fifth time, and will not be eligible again until 2028.

For many years, Carpenter lived in Cypress, California. Carpenter died of cancer in 2002 at his home in San Antonio, Texas, where he had been living since his release from prison in 1999.
