= Johan Klehs =

American politician

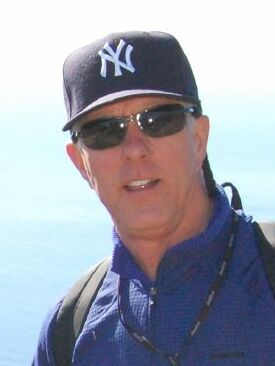
- Klehs in 2007

Member of the California State Assembly
- In office December 6, 2004 – November 30, 2006
- Preceded by: Ellen Corbett
- Succeeded by: Mary Hayashi
- Constituency: 18th district
- In office December 7, 1992 – November 30, 1994
- Preceded by: Delaine Eastin
- Succeeded by: Michael Sweeney
- Constituency: 18th district
- In office December 6, 1982 – November 30, 1992
- Preceded by: Bill Lockyer
- Succeeded by: Tom Bates
- Constituency: 14th district

Member of the California State Board of Equalization from the 1st district
- In office January 2, 1995 – January 6, 2003
- Preceded by: William Morgan Bennett
- Succeeded by: Carole Migden

Personal details
- Born: Johan Mahler Klehs; June 27, 1952 (age 74) Alameda, California, U.S.
- Party: Democratic
- Education: California State University, Hayward (BA, MPA)

Johan Mahler Klehs (born June 27, 1952) is an American politician who served on the California State Board of Equalization from 1995 to 2003. A member of the Democratic Party, Klehs served in the California State Assembly from 2004 to 2006 and from 1982 to 1994. He also served as a member of the San Leandro City Council from 1978 to 1982.

Klehs chaired the Board of Equalization three times during his tenure and was also a member of the California Franchise Tax Board. He was an unsuccessful Democratic candidate for California State Controller in 2002 and the California State Senate in 2006. After leaving elected office, Klehs joined the faculty of the University of California, Berkeley as a lecturer of political science and strategic advisor to the chancellor.

== Elected offices ==
California Assembly
Preceded by Bill Lockyer	California State Assemblyman, 14th District; 1982–1992	Succeeded by Tom Bates
Preceded by Delaine Eastin	California State Assemblyman, 18th District; 1992–1994	Succeeded by Michael Sweeney
Preceded by Ellen Corbett	California State Assemblyman, 18th District; 2004–2006	Succeeded by Mary Hayashi
