= 1990 California State Board of Equalization election =

1990 California State Board of Equalization elections
- November 6, 1990

All 4 seats on the California State Board of Equalization
	Majority party	Minority party	Third party
Party	Democratic	Republican	Libertarian
Last election	3	1	0
Seats before	3	1	0
Seats won	3	1	0
Seat change	Steady	Steady	Steady
Popular vote	3,277,069	2,984,615	355,472
Percentage	47.5%	43.5%	5.2%

The 1990 California State Board of Equalization elections took place on November 6, 1990, to elect all four seats of the State Board of Equalization, with the primary election taking place on June 5, 1990.

== Overview ==
California State Board of Equalization general election, 1990
Party	Candidates	Votes		Seats			
Party	Candidates	No.	%	Before	After	+/–	%
Democratic Party	4	3,277,069	47.5%	3	3	Steady	75.0%
Republican Party	4	2,984,615	43.5%	1	1	Steady	25.0%
Libertarian Party	3	355,472	5.2%	0	0	Steady	0.0%
Peace and Freedom Party	3	240,208	3.5%	0	0	Steady	0.0%
American Independent Party	1	40,563	0.6%	0	0	Steady	0.0%
Total	17	6,897,927	100.0%	4	4	Steady	100.0%

Popular vote
Democratic	47.5%
Republican	43.5%
Libertarian	5.2%
Peace and Freedom	3.5%
American Independent	0.6%

Board of Equalization seats
Democratic	75.0%
Republican	25.0%

Board of Equalization District	Incumbent	Party	Elected officeholder	Party
1st	William M. Bennett	Democratic	William M. Bennett	Democratic
2nd	Conway H. Collis	Democratic	Brad Sherman	Democratic
3rd	Ernest J. Dronenburg, Jr.	Republican	Ernest J. Dronenburg, Jr.	Republican
4th	Paul B. Carpenter	Democratic	Paul B. Carpenter (Note: Carpenter was convicted on corruption charges in 1990, but was still elected to a 4-year term on the State Board of Equalization. He was not allowed to take his seat, and Republican Matt Fong was appointed to the seat in 1991 for the remainder of the term.)	Democratic

== District 1 ==
The incumbent was Democrat William M. Bennett, who was elected in 1986. He was running for reelection.

=== Primary election ===
==== Results ====
1990 California State Board of Equalization District 1 Democratic primary
Party	Candidate	Votes	%
Democratic	William M. Bennett (incumbent)	458,461	63.9
Democratic	Joseph F. Micallef	140,613	19.6
Democratic	Tom Nakagawa	118,345	16.5
Total votes		717,419	100.0

1990 California State Board of Equalization District 1 Republican primary
Party	Candidate	Votes	%
Republican	Jeff Wallack	175,320	36.5
Republican	Frank W. Hauck	160,385	33.4
Republican	Paul E. Nelson	75,007	15.6
Republican	Samuel Mark Vanderbilt	69,587	14.5
Total votes		410,712	100.0

1990 California State Board of Equalization District 1 Libertarian primary
Party	Candidate	Votes	%
Libertarian	Michael R. Iddings	3,990	100.0
Total votes		3,990	100.0

=== General election ===
==== Candidates ====
- William M. Bennett (D), incumbent member of the Board of Equalization
- Michael R. Iddings (L)
- Jeff Wallack (R)

==== Results ====
California's 1st Board of Equalization district, 1990
Party	Candidate	Votes	%
Democratic	William M. Bennett (incumbent)	1,075,043	51.5
Republican	Jeff Wallack	832,471	39.9
Libertarian	Michael R. Iddings	179,495	8.6
Total votes		2,087,009	100.0
Democratic hold			

== District 2 ==
The incumbent was Democrat Conway H. Collis, who was elected in 1986. He did not seek reelection.

=== Primary election ===
==== Results ====
1990 California State Board of Equalization District 2 Democratic primary
Party	Candidate	Votes	%
Democratic	Brad Sherman	280,212	50.9
Democratic	Joseph G. Colman	92,017	16.7
Democratic	Louis John Papan	73,428	13.3
Democratic	Tom Baldwin	52,793	9.6
Democratic	Emil G. Pollak	31,182	5.7
Democratic	Edward Tabash	20,768	3.8
Total votes		550,400	100.0

1990 California State Board of Equalization District 2 Republican primary
Party	Candidate	Votes	%
Republican	Claude Parrish	260,165	61.4
Republican	Bill Duplissea	163,534	38.6
Total votes		423,699	100.0

1990 California State Board of Equalization District 2 American Independent primary
Party	Candidate	Votes	%
American Independent	Nicholas W. Kudrovzeff	3,461	100.0
Total votes		3,461	100.0

1990 California State Board of Equalization District 2 Libertarian primary
Party	Candidate	Votes	%
Libertarian	Lyn Sapwosky-Smith	2,953	100.0
Total votes		2,953	100.0

1990 California State Board of Equalization District 2 Peace and Freedom primary
Party	Candidate	Votes	%
Peace and Freedom	Nancy Lawrence	1,357	100.0
Total votes		1,357	100.0

=== General election ===
==== Candidates ====
- Nicholas W. Kudrovzeff (AI)
- Nancy Lawrence (P&F)
- Claude Parrish (R)
- Lyn Sapwosky-Smith (L)
- Brad Sherman (D)

==== Results ====
California's 2nd Board of Equalization district, 1990
Party	Candidate	Votes	%
Democratic	Brad Sherman	898,820	51.1
Republican	Claude Parrish	682,240	38.8
Peace and Freedom	Nancy Lawrence	75,575	4.3
Libertarian	Lyn Sapwosky-Smith	60,794	3.5
American Independent	Nicholas W. Kudrovzeff	40,563	2.3
Total votes		1,757,992	100.0
Democratic hold			

== District 3 ==
The incumbent was Republican Ernest J. Dronenburg, Jr., who was elected in 1986. He ran for reelection.

=== Primary election ===
==== Results ====
1990 California State Board of Equalization District 3 Democratic primary
Party	Candidate	Votes	%
Democratic	Floyd L. Morrow	366,500	100.0
Total votes		366,500	100.0

1990 California State Board of Equalization District 3 Republican primary
Party	Candidate	Votes	%
Republican	Ernest J. Dronenburg, Jr. (incumbent)	376,159	64.0
Republican	Jerry "Lee" Wilson	211,177	36.0
Total votes		587,336	100.0

1990 California State Board of Equalization District 3 Libertarian primary
Party	Candidate	Votes	%
Libertarian	Steven Currie	3,170	100.0
Total votes		3,170	100.0

1990 California State Board of Equalization District 3 Peace and Freedom primary
Party	Candidate	Votes	%
Peace and Freedom	C. T. Weber	867	100.0
Total votes		867	100.0

=== General election ===
==== Candidates ====
- Steven Currie (L)
- Ernest J. Dronenburg, Jr. (R), incumbent member of the Board of Equalization
- Floyd L. Morrow (D)
- C. T. Weber (P&F)

==== Results ====
California's 3rd Board of Equalization district, 1990
Party	Candidate	Votes	%
Republican	Ernest J. Dronenburg, Jr. (incumbent)	946,210	50.3
Democratic	Floyd L. Morrow	741,827	39.5
Libertarian	Steven Currie	115,183	6.1
Peace and Freedom	C. T. Weber	76,201	4.1
Total votes		1,879,421	100.0
Republican hold			

== District 4 ==
The incumbent was Democrat Paul B. Carpenter, who was elected in 1986. Carpenter was convicted in 1990 on corruption charges, and was not allowed take the seat following the 1990 election. Republican Matt Fong was appointed in 1991 to the district 4 seat for the remainder of the term.

=== Primary election ===
==== Results ====
1990 California State Board of Equalization District 4 Democratic primary
Party	Candidate	Votes	%
Democratic	Paul B. Carpenter (incumbent)	178,924	45.2
Democratic	Charles Davis	71,270	18.0
Democratic	Tim Mock	49,634	12.5
Democratic	Gary Gillan	41,641	10.5
Democratic	Warren Harwood	30,603	7.7
Democratic	Fred W. Chel	24,136	6.1
Total votes		396,208	100.0

1990 California State Board of Equalization District 4 Republican primary
Party	Candidate	Votes	%
Republican	Joe H. Adams Jr.	257,457	100.0
Total votes		257,457	100.0

1990 California State Board of Equalization District 4 Peace and Freedom primary
Party	Candidate	Votes	%
Peace and Freedom	Salomea Honigsfeld	818	100.0
Total votes		818	100.0

=== General election ===
==== Candidates ====
- Joe H. Adams Jr. (R)
- Paul B. Carpenter (D), incumbent member of the Board of Equalization
- Salomea Honigsfeld (P&F)

==== Results ====
California's 4th Board of Equalization district, 1990
Party	Candidate	Votes	%
Democratic	Paul B. Carpenter (incumbent)	561,379	47.8
Republican	Joe H. Adams Jr.	523,694	44.6
Peace and Freedom	Salomea Honigsfeld	88,432	7.5
Total votes		1,173,505	100.0
Democratic hold			
