= Dean Andal =

American businessman and politician (born 1959)

Member of the California State Assembly from the 17th district
- In office December 7, 1992 – November 30, 1994
- Preceded by: Willie Brown
- Succeeded by: Michael Machado

Member of the California State Assembly from the 26th district
- In office May 16, 1991 – November 30, 1992
- Preceded by: Patrick Johnson
- Succeeded by: Sal Cannella

Personal details
- Born: October 23, 1959 (age 66) Salem, Oregon, U.S.
- Party: Republican
- Spouse: Kari (m. 1987)
- Children: 1
- Education: University of California; University of the Pacific; University of Southern California

Dean Fredrick Andal (born October 23, 1959) is an American businessman and former Republican public official from Stockton, California.

== Business ==
Andal was the founder and president of Andal Communications, a bank and real estate marketing company. He was a member of the board of directors and audit committee for Service 1st Bancorp in Stockton, California. He was a director at KPMG, LLP (2002–04) and is currently a managing director at PwC, LLP, where he has been employed since 2009.

== Elected office ==
After his election to the San Joaquin County Board of Education in 1990, he won an upset 1991 special election to the California State Assembly in an overwhelmingly Democrat registered district against Democrat Patti Garamendi. The Assembly district had not elected a Republican in over 20 years. He compiled a conservative record and was appointed chief budget negotiator for the Assembly Republican Caucus.

He was reelected to a full term in 1992 in the closest state assembly race in California, and was named Legislator of the Year by the Howard Jarvis Taxpayers Association, National Tax Limitation Committee, and Crime Victims United. In 1994 he was elected to the five-member California Board of Equalization, California's tax board, and was reelected to a second term in 1998, serving as its chairman.

In 2002, he ran for California State Controller and finished second in the Republican primary. From 2004 to 2008, he served on the Lincoln Unified School Board. On November 4, 2008, Andal ran for Congress in California's 11th congressional district and was defeated by incumbent Democrat Jerry McNerney.

== Personal life ==
Andal was born in 1959 in Salem, Oregon, to Gene and Carolyn Andal. He graduated from Newbury Park High School in 1977, the University of California, San Diego (BA), the University of the Pacific (MA), and the University of Southern California (EdD).

He and his wife, Kari, have one adult son, Patrick, and reside in Stockton, California.
