= Carole Migden =

American politician (born 1948)

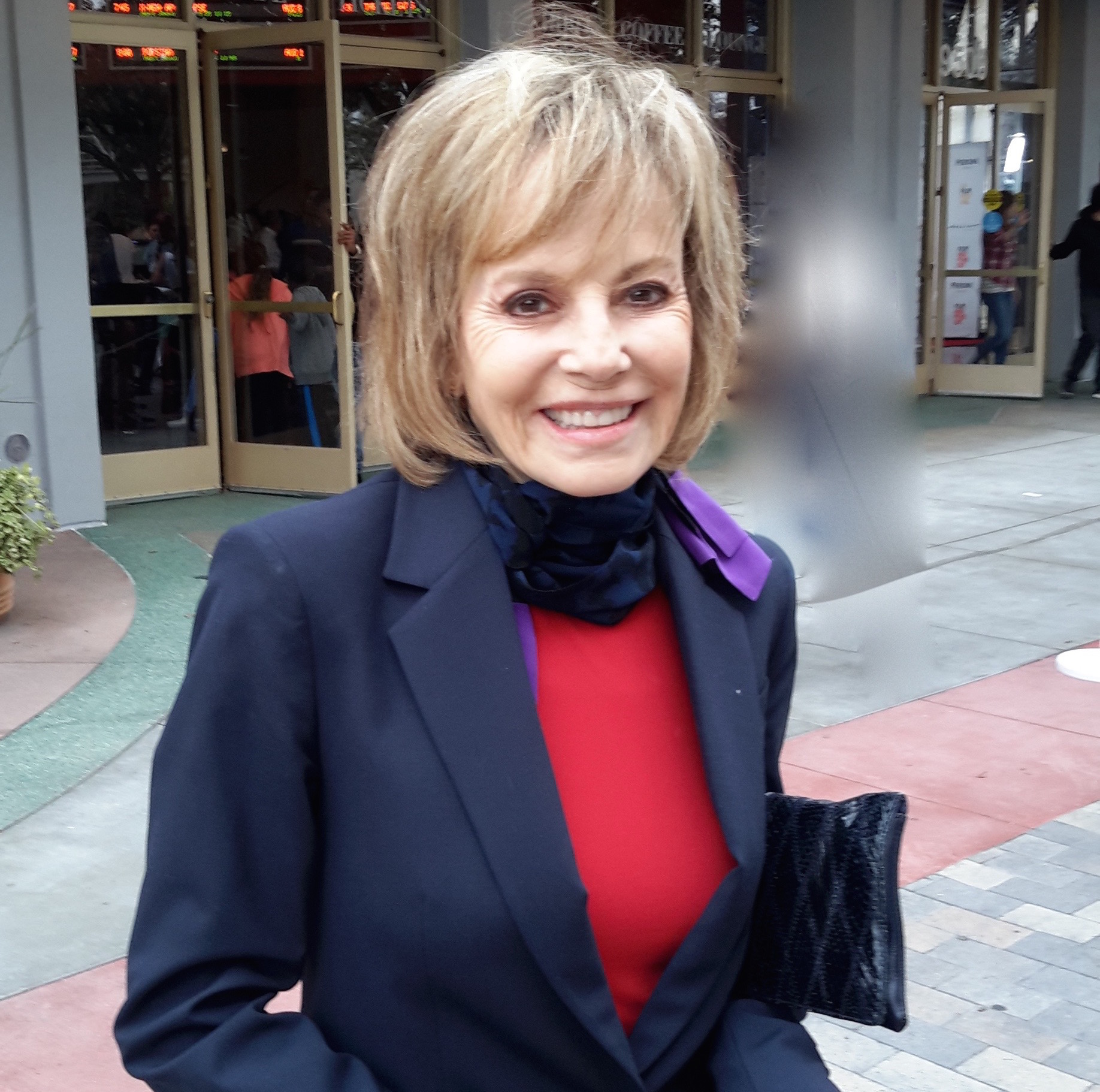
- Migden in 2016

Member of the California Senate from the 3rd district
- In office December 6, 2004 – November 30, 2008
- Preceded by: John L. Burton
- Succeeded by: Mark Leno

Member of the California State Assembly from the 13th district
- In office March 28, 1996 – November 30, 2002
- Preceded by: Willie Brown
- Succeeded by: Mark Leno

Member of the San Francisco Board of Supervisors
- In office January 8, 1991 – March 28, 1996
- Preceded by: Nancy G. Walker
- Succeeded by: Amos C. Brown

Personal details
- Born: August 14, 1948 (age 78)
- Party: Democratic

Carole Migden (born August 14, 1948) is an American politician from San Francisco who represented the third district of the California State Senate from 2004 to 2008 and the 13th district of the California State Assembly from 1996 to 2002. She is the state's second openly lesbian legislator.

Migden's former district, the 3rd Senate district, includes parts of San Francisco, Sonoma County, and Marin County. She was previously a member of the California State Assembly (1996–2002), where she became the first freshman, first woman, and first lesbian to chair the Committee on Appropriations. She was also Chairwoman of the California Board of Equalization (2002–2004), the nation's only publicly elected tax commission. Prior to that, she had served on the San Francisco Board of Supervisors (1991–1996). She also chaired the San Francisco Democratic Party for eight years and is a former member of the Democratic National Committee.

Migden was the Chairperson of California Senate Labor & Industrial Relations Committee and the Chairperson of the Senate Majority Caucus. She was previously the Senate Appropriations Committee Chair. She was, at the time, the only openly lesbian state legislator from Northern California.

In 2009, Migden was appointed State Commissioner of the California Integrated Waste Management Board (2009-2010), promoting green technology and a zero-based waste policy. In 2011, Appointed Commissioner of the California Agricultural Labor Relations Board (2011-2012), set up to protects the legal rights of agricultural workers.

== State legislature ==
In the State Assembly, Migden served for five years as Chairwoman of the Assembly Committee on Appropriations. She was the first woman and the first lesbian to chair that committee. She also served for four years as a conferee on the state's Joint Budget Conference Committee, which writes the final version of California's state budget. As a member of the State Assembly, Migden authored legislation to create California's domestic partner registry, promote children's health, preserve the old growth Headwaters Forest, increase accountability in K–12 schools, protect borrowers from predatory and deceptive lending practices, protect consumers from manipulation by energy generators, and promote the use of emergency contraception.

In 1998, Migden authored the '‘Safe Needles Act'’ (AB1208 - 1998) that became a national model for legislation that President Clinton signed into law in 2000. Prior to this bill being passed, needles injured 100,000 health care workers a year.

Migden authored the '‘Clean Water Act'’ in 1999 that imposed tougher penalties on industrial polluters dumping harmful toxins in California waterways. She also authored the Headwaters Forest and SF Wetlands/Cargill legislation that enabled the state preservation of the ancient Headwaters Forest and restoration of the San Francisco Baylands into a wildlife habitat and recovery of endangered species.

Over the last seven years Migden has authored legislation for domestic partnership in California providing benefits to the LGBT community and unmarried senior citizens. Assembly Bill 26 in 1999 marked the first time in the nation a state legislature passed a domestic partnership statute without forcible intervention of the courts. (Assembly Bill 26).

Migden's SB 565 provided for the legalization of the transfer of property between domestic partners without reassessment for tax purposes (Senate Bill 565) and provided for the filing of domestic partner income-tax returns under the same status as married couples. (Senate Bill 1827).

In 2005, Migden's SB 663 closed tax loopholes allowing corporate giants to put millions in offshore tax shelters and depleting the state of revenues. Migden has authored legislation to improve foster care that created new programs such as transitional housing, increased savings accounts, and adoption incentives for parents adopting teenagers.

Migden has authored legislation providing for rapid HIV testing (AB 1263), protection of health care workers from needle injuries (AB 1046) and enabling of HIV positive people to have healthy children (SB 443).

In 2002, Migden authored legislation (AB 1860) requiring the state to provide information regarding the "morning after" contraception to female victims of sexual assault.

Staunchly opposed to the war in Iraq, Migden became one of the first critics of the war and passed a Senate resolution making California the first state in the nation to formally oppose the surge of troops in Iraq.

== Marin ==
In the fall of 2007, Migden helped resolve a five-year- standoff between Marin County and the state of California regarding property taxes taken by the State and diverted to fund education deficits. With rising property tax values, the state decided to withhold an additional $4 million of county generated tax revenues to pay for programs for troubled children throughout California. Marin officials claimed the state was forcing the county to shoulder an unfair degree of state oriented funding. Governor Arnold Schwarzenegger vetoed two bills pushed forward by Migden to resolve the issue. Migden's third bill passed and resulted in cutting the amount of surplus funds the county will annually pay to the state by half. The bill resulted in an extra $1.9 million a year for Marin County and a total return of $24.7 million to the area.

== Personal life ==
Migden was born August 14, 1948, in New York City. She is Jewish. Migden has a Bachelor of Arts degree from Adelphi University and a Master of Arts degree from Sonoma State University.

=== Marriage ===
In February 2004, she married Cristina Arguedas, a criminal defense attorney and her partner since 1985, in a ceremony at San Francisco City Hall officiated by San Francisco Mayor Gavin Newsom. That marriage was later annulled by the California Supreme Court.

=== Leukemia ===
On May 23, 2007, Migden announced that she was diagnosed with leukemia in 1997 (about a year into her first Assembly term). She was only expected to live 3–5 years after her diagnosis.

Migden underwent rigorous and difficult chemotherapies for two years before finally becoming a participant in clinical trial, which ultimately got FDA approval for Gleevec, which has proven to be a watershed cancer drug. She has been in complete remission for many years.

Migden's legislative activity persisted, uninterrupted, during the time she was undergoing treatment, continuing to enact legislation including the Clean Water Act, the first Domestic Partnership bill, HMO Health Care Reform, and many others.

=== Driving history ===
In 1996, Migden ran a stop sign by the State Capitol and crashed into a 1990 Dodge Spirit sedan owned by Teresa Latham. The crash injured Latham and destroyed Latham's car. Latham claimed that Migden did not "seem concerned at all about the situation." Migden accepted full responsibility for the accident and refutes the claim that she was not concerned about Latham or her car.

On May 18, 2007, Migden crashed her SUV into a sedan which was stopped at a red light, injuring Ellen Butawan and her 3-year-old daughter, who were sent to the emergency room. Migden claims that she may have suffered from an adverse response to her leukemia treatment that led her to drive erratically. 911 tapes released in August show other drivers who saw her during her 30-mile trip along I-80 were panicking as they reported seeing her hit the center divider, and repeatedly come close to hitting other cars, before finally hitting one. One motorist claimed Migden told her, "You can't talk to me like that. I'm a senator." Migden voluntarily ceased driving as she continued to undergo treatment and as medical tests were pursued. Migden claimed that her "wild ride" occurred during state business, so that the Department of General Services paid $335,000 to Butawan in July 2009.

In May 2007, Migden said "I owe an explanation to the public and myself and, in particular, the person I hurt."

On August 10, 2007, Migden entered a nolo contendere (no contest) plea to charges of reckless driving, paid a $710 fine and was sentenced to two years of probation.

== Awards ==
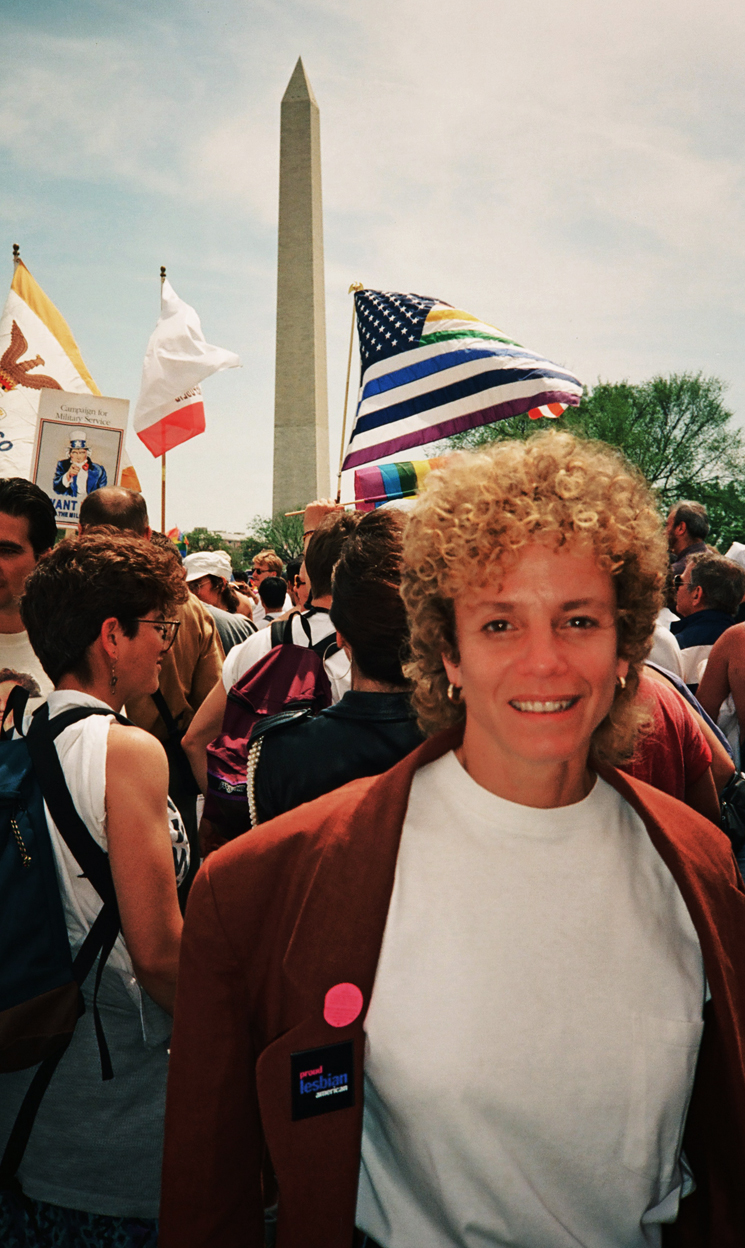
Carole Migden at the 1993 March on Washington for Gay Rights

In 1998, Migden was named "Rookie of the year" award by the California Journal, giving her top honors in the categories of integrity, intelligence, hardest working and most influential. In 1999, Migden received "Legislator of the Year" honors from the California School Employees Association. and the National Center for Lesbian Rights' "Lesbian Leadership Award". In 2000, she was recognized with the "Affordable Housing Leadership Award". In 2001, Migden was named "Legislator of the Year" by the California National Organization for Women.

== Election 2008 ==
Seeking a second term in the state senate, Migden failed to win renomination in the 2008 primary election held on 2008-06-03. She finished second in a three-way race. Assemblyman Mark Leno won the nomination, while Migden finished slightly ahead of former Assemblyman Joe Nation from El Verano. She was the first legislator to lose a renomination since Assemblyman Brian Setencich lost his primary race in 1996. The election was won by Democrat Mark Leno.

The race was one of the costliest legislative races in the state. Migden came into the race with $647,000 in the bank from past races, but according to the Fair Political Practices Commission (FPPC), she did not properly transfer campaign funds. The FPPC investigators found 89 violations in campaign finance reporting. The FPPC originally prevented her from using the $647,000 from previous races. On March 6, Migden filed a legal challenge against the FPPC, claiming the FPPC ruling had violated her right to free speech. The FPPC settled the dispute with Migden for a record $350,000 fine. Richie Ross, Migden's campaign consultant, called the issues in the complaint legitimate, saying, "There's no excuse, and she will have to take her legitimate lumps. I know it, and she knows it."

Democratic delegates at the state party convention in March 2008 voted not to endorse Migden 742–298.
