= 2002 San Francisco Board of Supervisors election =

- November 5, 2002

The 2002 San Francisco Board of Supervisors elections occurred on November 5, 2002, with runoff elections held on December 10, 2002. Five of the eleven seats were contested in this election. Three incumbents ran for reelection, while two sought another office.

Municipal elections in California are officially non-partisan, though most candidates in San Francisco do receive funding and support from various political parties. This was the last Board of Supervisors election in San Francisco to use the two-round system of elections.

== Results ==
=== District 2 ===

District 2 consists of the Marina, Pacific Heights, the Presidio, part of Russian Hill, and Sea Cliff. Incumbent supervisor Gavin Newsom ran for reelection.

District 2 supervisorial election, 2002
Candidate	Votes	%
Gavin Newsom (incumbent)	15,674	78.77
Lynne Newhouse Segal	3,247	15.81
Len Pettigrew	821	4.13
H. Brown	209	1.05
Write-in	48	0.24
Valid votes	19,899	82.14%
Invalid or blank votes	4,326	17.86
Total votes	24,225	100.00
Turnout	{{{votes}}}	52.69%

=== District 4 ===

District 4 consists primarily of the Sunset district. Incumbent supervisor Leland Yee did not seek reelection, instead running for a seat in the California State Assembly.

District 4 supervisorial election, 2002
Candidate	Votes	%
Fiona Ma	4,259	23.56
Ron Dudum	4,145	22.93
Ed Jew	2,915	16.12
Andrew Lee	2,897	16.03
Joel Ventresca	1,522	8.42
Barry Hermanson	1,252	6.93
Marks Lam	675	3.73
Krista Spence Loretto	393	2.17
Write-in	20	0.11
Valid votes	18078	88.39%
Invalid or blank votes	2,374	11.61
Total votes	20,452	100.00
Turnout	{{{votes}}}	52.97%
Runoff election
Fiona Ma	8,289	56.19
Ron Dudum	6,462	43.81
Valid votes	14,751	99.76%
Invalid or blank votes	36	0.24
Total votes	14,787	100.00
Turnout	{{{votes}}}	38.1%

=== District 6 ===

District 6 consists of Alcatraz Island, Civic Center, Mission Bay, South of Market, the Tenderloin, Treasure Island, and Yerba Buena Island. Incumbent supervisor Chris Daly ran for reelection.

District 6 supervisorial election, 2002
Candidate	Votes	%
Chris Daly (incumbent)	6,645	51.21
Burke Strunsky	1,896	14.61
Roger Gordon	1,859	14.33
Michael A. Sweet	1,247	9.61
Arthur Jackson	343	2.64
Malinka Moye	304	2.34
Garrett Jenkins	274	2.11
Robert N. Power	199	1.53
James Leo Dunn	183	1.41
Write-in	27	0.21
Valid votes	12,977	83.84%
Invalid or blank votes	2,502	16.16
Total votes	15,479	100.00
Turnout	{{{votes}}}	43.55%

=== District 8 ===

District 8 consists of The Castro, Diamond Heights, Duboce Triangle, Eureka Valley, Glen Park, and Noe Valley. Incumbent supervisor Mark Leno did not seek reelection, instead running for a seat in the California State Assembly.

District 8 supervisorial election, 2002
Candidate	Votes	%
Eileen Hansen	9,820	36.23
Bevan Dufty	8,795	32.45
Tom Radulovich	5,221	19.26
James Green	1,896	7.00
Starchild	825	3.04
Shawn O'Hearn	485	1.79
Write-in	59	0.22
Valid votes	27,101	84.95%
Invalid or blank votes	4,801	15.05
Total votes	31,902	100.00
Turnout	{{{votes}}}	58.88%
Runoff election
Bevan Dufty	11,906	52.61
Eileen Hansen	9,995	47.39
Valid votes	21,091	99.91%
Invalid or blank votes	19	0.09
Total votes	21,110	100.00
Turnout	{{{votes}}}	38.58%

=== District 10 ===

District 10 consists of Bayview-Hunters Point, McLaren Park, part of the Portola, Potrero Hill, and Visitacion Valley. Incumbent supervisor Sophie Maxwell ran for reelection unopposed.

District 10 supervisorial election, 2002
Candidate	Votes	%
Sophie Maxwell (incumbent)	9,723	97.45
Write-in	254	2.55
Invalid or blank votes	9,977	66.15
Invalid or blank votes	5,105	33.85
Total votes	15,082	100.00
Turnout	{{{votes}}}	38.39%
