= 2010 San Francisco Board of Supervisors election =

- November 2, 2010

The 2010 San Francisco Board of Supervisors elections were held on November 2, 2010. Five of the eleven seats of the San Francisco Board of Supervisors were contested in this election. Four incumbents were termed out of office, while one ran for reelection.

Municipal elections in California are officially non-partisan, though most candidates in San Francisco do receive funding and support from various political parties. The election was held using ranked-choice voting.

== Results ==
=== District 2 ===

District 2 consists of the Marina, Pacific Heights, the Presidio, part of Russian Hill, and Sea Cliff. Incumbent supervisor Michela Alioto-Pier was termed out of office.

District 2 supervisorial election, 2010
Candidate	Votes	%
Janet Reilly	9,874	41.09
Mark Farrell	9,675	40.26
Abraham Simmons	2,068	8.61
Kat Anderson	1,703	7.09
Barbara Berwick	533	2.22
Vinta B. Guinto Peoro	159	0.66
Write-in	18	0.07
Valid votes	24,030	83.12%
Invalid or blank votes	4,881	16.88
Total votes	28,911	100.00
Turnout	{{{votes}}}	62.36%
Ranked choice voting — Pass 1
Janet Reilly	9,898	41.08
Mark Farrell	9,700	40.26
Abraham Simmons (eliminated)	2,074	8.61
Kat Anderson (eliminated)	1,707	7.08
Barbara Berwick (eliminated)	537	2.23
Vinta B. Guinto Peoro (eliminated)	160	0.66
Write-in (eliminated)	18	0.07
Eligible votes	24,094	83.34%
Exhausted votes	4,817	16.66%
Total votes	28,911	100.00
Ranked choice voting — Pass 2
Mark Farrell	11,426	50.57
Janet Reilly	11,168	49.43
Eligible votes	22,594	78.15%
Exhausted votes	6,317	21.85%
Total votes	28,911	100.00

=== District 4 ===

District 4 consists primarily of the Sunset district. Incumbent supervisor Carmen Chu ran for reelection unopposed.

District 4 supervisorial election, 2010
Candidate	Votes	%
Carmen Chu (incumbent)	16,931	98.85
Write-in	248	1.44
Valid votes	17,179	74.39%
Invalid or blank votes	5,913	25.61
Total votes	23,092	100.00
Turnout	{{{votes}}}	58.94%

=== District 6 ===

District 6 consists of Alcatraz Island, Civic Center, Mission Bay, South of Market, the Tenderloin, Treasure Island, and Yerba Buena Island. Incumbent supervisor Chris Daly was termed out of office.

District 6 supervisorial election, 2010
Candidate	Votes	%
Jane Kim	6,591	31.41
Debra Walker	5,651	26.93
Theresa Sparks	3,584	17.08
James Keys	957	4.56
Matt Drake	944	4.50
Glendon "Anna Conda" Hyde	687	3.27
Elaine Zamora	633	3.02
Dean Clark	595	2.84
Jim Meko	404	1.93
George Vazhappally	240	1.14
Matt Ashe	185	0.88
h. Brown	181	0.86
George Davis	155	0.74
Nate Payne	149	0.71
Write-in	29	0.14
Valid votes	20,985	83.75%
Invalid or blank votes	4,072	16.25
Total votes	25,057	100.00
Turnout	{{{votes}}}	54.49%
Ranked choice voting — Pass 12
Jane Kim	8,865	54.08
Debra Walker	7,528	45.92
Eligible votes	16,393	65.42%
Exhausted votes	8,664	34.58%
Total votes	25,057	100.00

==== Ranked-choice vote distribution ====
Candidate	Pass 1	Pass 2	Pass 3	Pass 4	Pass 5	Pass 6	Pass 7	Pass 8	Pass 9	Pass 10	Pass 11	Pass 12
Jane Kim	6,621	6,623	6,635	6,646	6,674	6,697	6,720	6,800	6,908	7,039	7,767	8,865
Debra Walker	5,669	5,670	5,689	5,716	5,741	5,763	5,781	5,857	5,994	6,101	6,701	7,528
Theresa Sparks	3,605	3,605	3,611	3,623	3,642	3,655	3,671	3,719	3,781	3,882	4,334	
Matt Drake	947	947	955	962	986	996	1,031	1,077	1,133	1,200		
James Keys	960	960	966	974	980	995	1,002	1,043	1,102	1,148		
Glendon "Anna Conda" Hyde	692	693	709	723	740	748	757	779	804	839		
Elaine Zamora	637	637	640	649	657	673	695	714	746			
Dean Clark	602	602	612	623	629	662	697	713				
Jim Meko	407	407	420	424	436	447	498					
George Vazhapally	242	242	261	270	277	284						
h. Brown	182	182	187	198	205							
Matt Ashe	185	186	188	191								
George Davis	158	158	160									
Nate Payne	150	150										
Write-in	29											
Eligible ballots	21,086	21,062	21,033	20,999	20,967	20,920	20,852	20,702	20,468	20,209	18,802	16,393
Exhausted ballots	3,971	3,995	4,027	4,058	4,090	4,137	4,205	4,355	4,589	4,848	6,255	8,664
Total	25,057	25,057	25,057	25,057	25,057	25,057	25,057	25,057	25,057	25,057	25,057	25,057

=== District 8 ===

District 8 consists of The Castro, Diamond Heights, Duboce Triangle, Eureka Valley, Glen Park, and Noe Valley. Incumbent supervisor Bevan Dufty was termed out of office.

District 8 supervisorial election, 2010
Candidate	Votes	%
Scott Wiener	14,797	42.41
Rafael Mandelman	12,414	35.58
Rebecca Prozan	5,860	16.79
Bill Hemenger	1,791	5.13
Write-in	30	0.09
Valid votes	34,892	90.51%
Invalid or blank votes	3,659	9.49
Total votes	38,551	100.00
Turnout	{{{votes}}}	71.59%
Ranked choice voting — Pass 1
Scott Wiener	14,813	42.38
Rafael Mandelman	12,433	35.57
Rebecca Prozan (eliminated)	5,872	16.80
Bill Hemenger (eliminated)	1,802	5.16
Write-in (eliminated)	30	0.09
Eligible votes	34,950	90.66%
Exhausted votes	3,602	9.34%
Total votes	38,551	100.00
Ranked choice voting — Pass 2
Scott Wiener	18,239	55.39
Rafael Mandelman	14,687	44.61
Eligible votes	32,926	85.41%
Exhausted votes	5,625	14.59%
Total votes	38,551	100.00

=== District 10 ===

District 10 consists of Bayview-Hunters Point, McLaren Park, part of the Portola, Potrero Hill, and Visitacion Valley. Incumbent supervisor Sophie Maxwell was termed out of office.

District 10 supervisorial election, 2010
Candidate	Votes	%
Lynette Sweet	2,137	12.07
Tony Kelly	2,095	11.83
Malia Cohen	2,083	11.77
Marlene Tran	2,037	11.51
Steve Moss	1,959	11.06
Teresa Duque	1,427	8.06
DeWitt M. Lacy	1,272	7.18
Chris Jackson	1,085	6.13
Kristine Enea	543	3.07
Eric Smith	448	2.53
James M. Calloway	413	2.33
Diane Wesley Smith	390	2.20
Geoffrea Morris	330	1.86
Stephen Weber	310	1.75
Ashley Hawley Rhodes	259	1.46
Rodney Hampton, Jr.	235	1.33
Ed Donaldson	202	1.14
Jackie Norman	183	1.03
Nyese Joshua	134	0.76
MJ Marie Franklin	80	0.45
Ellsworth "Ell" Jennison	67	0.38
Write-in	16	0.09
Valid votes	17,705	86.16%
Invalid or blank votes	2,845	13.84
Total votes	20,550	100.00
Turnout	{{{votes}}}	51.64%
Ranked choice voting — Pass 20
Malia Cohen	4,321	52.70
Tony Kelly	3,879	47.30
Eligible votes	8,200	39.90%
Exhausted votes	12,350	60.10%
Total votes	20,550	100.00

==== Ranked-choice vote distribution ====
Candidate	Pass 1	Pass 2	Pass 3	Pass 4	Pass 5	Pass 6	Pass 7	Pass 8	Pass 9	Pass 10	Pass 11	Pass 12	Pass 13	Pass 14	Pass 15	Pass 16	Pass 17	Pass 18	Pass 19	Pass 20
Malia Cohen	2,097	2,098	2,100	2,105	2,111	2,132	2,154	2,194	2,215	2,244	2,300	2,386	2,423	2,530	2,677	2,741	3,229	3,501	4,120	4,321
Tony Kelly	2,102	2,102	2,108	2,111	2,132	2,136	2,139	2,150	2,155	2,180	2,185	2,281	2,310	2,410	2,639	2,661	2,858	3,392	3,576	3,879
Marlene Tran	2,049	2,049	2,052	2,059	2,071	2,072	2,074	2,096	2,104	2,116	2,124	2,132	2,169	2,216	2,300	3,039	3,084	3,231	3,330	
Lynette Sweet	2,150	2,153	2,156	2,162	2,170	2,189	2,227	2,243	2,278	2,291	2,338	2,355	2,396	2,543	2,682	2,712	2,880	3,201		
Steve Moss	1,969	1,969	1,971	1,977	1,979	1,987	1,999	2,003	2,013	2,047	2,059	2,106	2,139	2,255	2,364	2,440	2,609			
DeWitt M. Lacy	1,274	1,276	1,279	1,282	1,292	1,298	1,317	1,324	1,337	1,361	1,384	1,439	1,471	1,585	1,722	1,757				
Teresa Duque	1,441	1,441	1,443	1,449	1,456	1,459	1,464	1,467	1,473	1,483	1,495	1,499	1,512	1,542	1,574					
Chris Jackson	1,088	1,088	1,094	1,098	1,110	1,126	1,134	1,143	1,167	1,180	1,196	1,236	1,281	1,370						
Kristine Enea	544	544	548	552	555	559	564	578	585	610	617	634	654							
Diane Wesley Smith	399	399	400	400	412	428	432	461	476	499	515	526	567							
James M. Calloway	417	418	422	430	434	437	443	464	478	494	511	522								
Eric Smith	448	448	451	454	454	459	462	465	474	480	484									
Geoffrea Morris	333	333	333	336	344	349	352	356	373	375										
Stephen Weber	311	311	315	316	318	321	326	339	349											
Rodney Hampton, Jr.	237	237	239	243	251	261	280	290												
Ashley Hawley Rhodes	260	260	262	263	265	277	278													
Ed Donaldson	202	202	202	202	205	206														
Jackie Norman	186	186	188	191	193															
Nyese Joshua	135	135	141	147																
MJ Marie Franklin	81	81	85																	
Ellsworth "Ell" Jennison	68	68																		
Write-in	17																			
Eligible ballots	17,808	17,798	17,789	17,777	17,752	17,696	17,645	17,573	17,477	17,360	17,208	17,116	16,922	16,451	15,958	15,350	14,660	13,325	11,026	8,200
Exhausted ballots	2,742	2,752	2,761	2,773	2,798	2,854	2,905	2,977	3,073	3,190	3,342	3,434	3,628	4,099	4,592	5,200	5,890	7,225	9,524	12,350
Total	20,550	20,550	20,550	20,550	20,550	20,550	20,550	20,550	20,550	20,550	20,550	20,550	20,550	20,550	20,550	20,550	20,550	20,550	20,550	20,550
