= Sophie Maxwell =

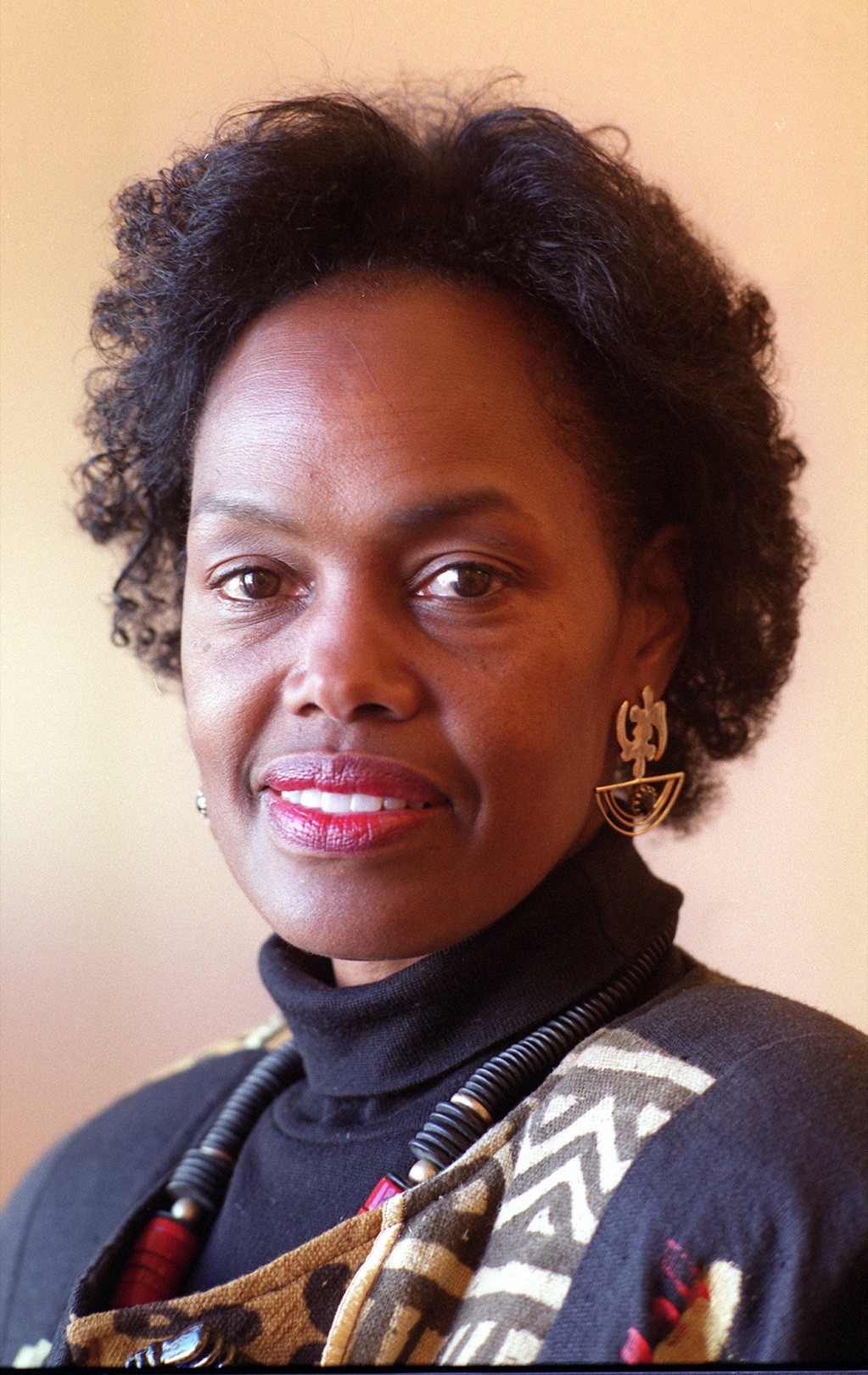

Member of the San Francisco Board of Supervisors from the 10th district
- In office January 2001 – January 2011
- Preceded by: District established
- Succeeded by: Malia Cohen

Personal details
- Born: April 9, 1950 (age 76) San Francisco, California
- Relations: Enola Maxwell (mother)
- Occupation: Politician

Sophie Maxwell (April 9, 1950) is an American politician. She is a former member of the San Francisco Board of Supervisors, representing District 10.

== Early life ==
Maxwell has lived in the Bayview district in San Francisco, California for the last twenty years.

Prior to her election, Maxwell worked as an electrician for Amtrak.

== Political career ==
In the 2000 San Francisco Board of Supervisors election Maxwell defeated San Francisco Planning Commissioner Linda Fadeke Richardson, who was supported by mayor Willie Brown. As a result of the shift from at-large to district elections, she served a transitional two-year term. She ran unopposed in the 2002 San Francisco Board of Supervisors election. She won re-election in the 2006 San Francisco Board of Supervisors election against six other candidates.

Themes of her work covered issues such as: environmental justice, clean energy and equitable distribution of public resources. Maxwell supported housing development at the Hunters Point Naval Shipyard, believing that it would bring 10,000 jobs to the area. Environmental activists have called for the preservation of the neighboring Yosemite Slough wetlands.

During her tenure, there were three failed recall campaigns against Maxwell by her constituents. In the second attempt in 2004, half of the 6000 signatures were deemed invalid and the petition was later thrown out. The 2010 recall campaign was partially motivated by Maxwell's vote against advising the United States Navy from re-establishing the Restoration Advisory Board, founded in 1994 to inform the neighboring communities around the Hunters Point Naval Shipyard cleanup. Maxwell has stated that she offered the Navy the choice of either reinstating the board or finding new ways to engage the community, however her critics found that to be weak stance.

Her termed finished in January 2011 and was succeeded by Malia Cohen.

In the 2010 San Francisco Board of Supervisors election, Maxwell endorsed Bay Area Rapid Transit board member Lynette Sweet in a race that consisted of 21 candidates.

In April 2019, Mayor London Breed Maxwell appointed her to the San Francisco Public Utilities Commission.

== Personal life ==
Maxwell's mother, Enola D. Maxwell, was a neighborhood activist in Potrero Hill and former executive director of the Potrero Hill Neighborhood House. The Potrero Hill Middle School at 655 De Haro Street was renamed Enola D. Maxwell Middle School of the Arts in 2001. The building was then converted to International Studies Academy, which closed in 2016, and is now the site of San Francisco International High School. Her son Rama died of Hodgkin lymphoma at the age of 30. She is divorced.

Political offices
New district	Member of the San Francisco Board of Supervisors; District 10; January 8, 2001 – January 8, 2011	Succeeded by Malia Cohen
