= 2006 San Francisco Board of Supervisors election =

- November 7, 2006

The 2006 San Francisco Board of Supervisors elections occurred on November 7, 2006. Five of the eleven seats were contested in this election. Four of the five incumbents ran for reelection, while one sought another elected office.

Municipal elections in California are officially non-partisan, though most candidates in San Francisco do receive funding and support from various political parties.

== Results ==
=== District 2 ===

District 2 consists of the Marina, Pacific Heights, the Presidio, part of Russian Hill, and Sea Cliff. Incumbent supervisor Michela Alioto-Pier ran for reelection.

District 2 supervisorial election, 2006
Candidate	Votes	%
Michela Alioto-Pier (incumbent)	16,393	80.13
Vilma Guinto Peoro	3,353	16.39
Dave Kiddoo (write-in)	712	3.48
Valid votes	20,458	76.18%
Invalid or blank votes	6,396	23.81
Total votes	26,854	100.00
Turnout	{{{votes}}}	62.72%

=== District 4 ===

District 4 consists primarily of the Sunset district. Incumbent supervisor Fiona Ma did not run for reelection.

District 4 supervisorial election, 2006
Candidate	Votes	%
Ed Jew	5,125	26.23
Ron Dudum	5,072	25.96
Jaynry Mak	4,504	23.05
Doug Chan	3,192	16.34
David Ferguson	1,419	7.26
Houston Zheng	225	1.15
Valid votes	19,539	87.68%
Invalid or blank votes	2,746	12.32
Total votes	22,285	100.00
Turnout	{{{votes}}}	60.79%
Ranked choice voting — Pass 4
Ed Jew	8,388	52.51
Ron Dudum	7,587	47.49
Eligible votes	15,975	72.66%
Exhausted votes	6,010	27.34%
Total votes	21,985	100.00

==== Ranked-choice vote distribution ====
Candidate	Pass 1	Pass 2	Pass 3	Pass 4
Ed Jew	5,184	5,441	6,455	8,388
Ron Dudum	5,134	5,521	6,305	7,587
Jaynry Mak	4,569	5,012	5,851	
Doug Chan	3,236	3,414		
David Ferguson	1,455			
Houston Zheng	234			
Eligible ballots	19,814	19,388	18,611	15,975
Exhausted ballots	2,171	2,597	3,374	6,010
Total	21,985	21,985	21,985	21,985

=== District 6 ===

District 6 consists of Alcatraz Island, Civic Center, Mission Bay, South of Market, the Tenderloin, Treasure Island, and Yerba Buena Island. Incumbent supervisor Chris Daly ran for reelection.

District 6 supervisorial election, 2006
Candidate	Votes	%
Chris Daly (incumbent)	8,654	48.82
Rob Black	7,051	39.77
Matt Drake	669	3.77
Davy Jones	372	2.10
Viliam Dugovic	330	1.86
Manuel Jimenez, Jr.	311	1.75
George Dias	222	1.25
Robert Jordan	119	0.67
Valid votes	17,728	89.02%
Invalid or blank votes	2,187	10.98
Total votes	19,915	100.00
Turnout	{{{votes}}}	55.94%
Ranked choice voting — Pass 5
Chris Daly (incumbent)	8,968	50.82
Rob Black	7,303	41.39
Matt Drake	869	4.92
Davy Jones	506	2.87
Eligible votes	17,646	88.61%
Exhausted votes	2,269	11.39%
Total votes	19,915	100.00

==== Ranked-choice vote distribution ====
Candidate	Pass 1	Pass 2	Pass 3	Pass 4	Pass 5
Chris Daly	8,746	8,763	8,803	8,871	8,968
Rob Black	7,115	7,115	7,173	7,215	7,303
Matt Drake	679	688	725	830	869
Davy Jones	389	402	421	463	506
Manuel Jimenez, Jr.	317	328	375	399	
Viliam Dugovic	340	348	358		
George Dias	230	231			
Robert Jordan	125				
Eligible ballots	17,941	17,894	17,855	17,778	17,646
Exhausted ballots	1,974	2,021	2,060	2,137	2,269
Total	19,915	19,915	19,915	19,915	19,915

=== District 8 ===

District 8 consists of The Castro, Diamond Heights, Duboce Triangle, Eureka Valley, Glen Park, and Noe Valley. Incumbent supervisor Bevan Dufty ran for reelection.

District 8 supervisorial election, 2006
Candidate	Votes	%
Bevan Dufty (incumbent)	20,761	66.24
Alex Rosenthal	9,109	29.07
Starchild	1,470	4.69
Valid votes	31,340	87.84%
Invalid or blank votes	4,340	12.16
Total votes	35,680	100.00
Turnout	{{{votes}}}	70.9%

=== District 10 ===

District 10 consists of Bayview-Hunters Point, McLaren Park, part of the Portola, Potrero Hill, and Visitacion Valley. Incumbent supervisor Sophie Maxwell ran for reelection.

District 10 supervisorial election, 2006
Candidate	Votes	%
Sophie Maxwell (incumbent)	7,916	56.17
Dwayne Jusino	1,684	11.95
Espanola Jackson	1,437	10.20
Rodney Hampton, Jr.	1,185	8.41
Marie L. Harrison	1,129	8.01
Charlie Walker	473	3.36
Sala Chandler	270	1.92
Valid votes	14,094	83.20%
Invalid or blank votes	2,846	16.80
Total votes	16,940	100.00
Turnout	{{{votes}}}	49.77%
