= Starchild (activist) =

American perennial candidate

- Born: c. 1971–1972 (age 53–55); California
- Occupations: Sex worker; Activist
- Political party: Libertarian

Starchild (born Chris Fox, 1971 or 1972) is an American libertarian activist, perennial candidate and sex worker from San Francisco. He is known for his flamboyant style of dress.

== Background ==
Starchild grew up in the East Bay and moved to San Francisco after a stint in the United States Army Reserves. He adopted the 'Starchild' moniker in the 1990s, and had his name legally changed in 1998. He is bisexual. Starchild has worked as an escort and erotic dancer. In 2005, Starchild was arrested for prostitution, though he was acquitted by a jury in 2007.

== Political activities ==
Starchild is an activist for the Libertarian Party and advocate for the decriminalization of sex work. In 2012 and 2016, Starchild was elected to an at-large position on the Libertarian National Committee. As of 2024, he is the Chair of the Libertarian Party of San Francisco.

Starchild has run as a Libertarian for the California State Assembly twice. In 2000, he ran in the 13th District and placed third with 6.4% of the vote. In 2020, he ran in the 17th District and advanced from the top-two primary to the general election, but lost to Democratic incumbent David Chiu 88.9%–11.1%. Starchild has also run for local office numerous times, including for the San Francisco Board of Supervisors in 2002 and 2006 and the San Francisco Board of Education in 2004 and 2010.

At the 2016 Libertarian National Convention, Starchild gained attention for wearing a see-through raincoat with a Speedo underneath to "demand transparency". During the speech of Donald Trump at the 2024 Libertarian National Convention, Starchild, dressed as Princess Leia, unfurled a "No Wannabe Dictators" banner in protest. He was taken to the ground by security and removed from the venue.
