= Molokans =

Ethno-religious group of Russian origin

Molokan (Spiritual Christians)
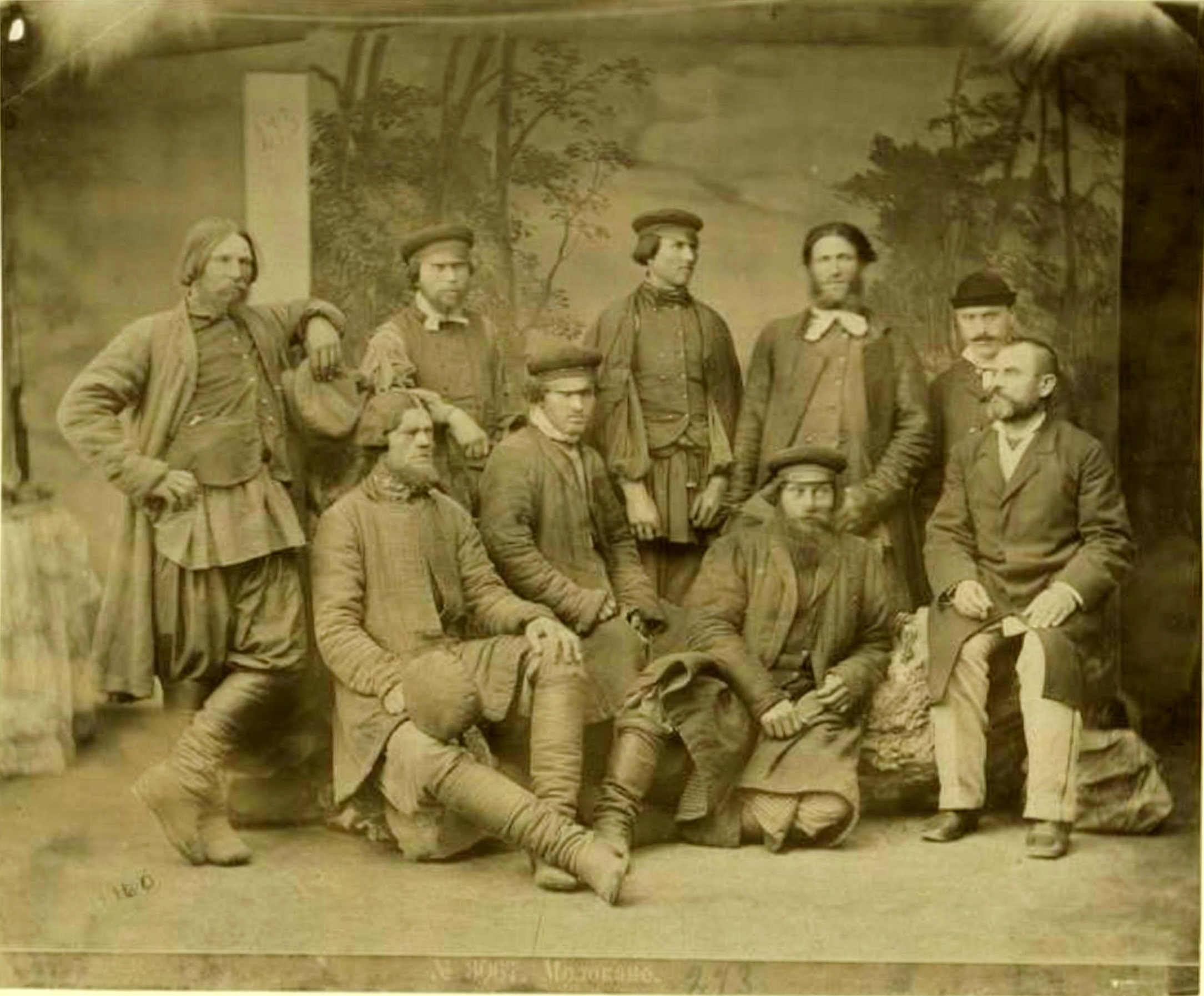
- Molokan men, 1870s

Founder
- Semyon Uklein (1733–1809)

Regions with significant populations
- Russia: 50,000–100,000; Ukraine: 10,000–20,000; Armenia: 10,000–20,000; Georgia: 5,000–15,000; United States: 10,000; Azerbaijan: 5,000–10,000; Mexico: 2,000; Australia: ~2000; Turkey: 1,000 (ancestry)

Religions
- Christianity (Spiritual Christianity)

Scriptures
- Bible

Languages
- Russian; Erzyan; English

Related ethnic groups
- Russians; Mordovians

Website
- сдхм.рф; molokane.org

The Molokans (Russian: молокан, IPA: [məlɐˈkan] or молоканин, "dairy-eater") are a Russian Spiritual Christian sect that evolved from Eastern Orthodoxy in the East Slavic lands. Their traditions, especially dairy consumption during Christian fasts, did not conform to those of the Russian Orthodox Church, and they were regarded as heretics (sektanty). The term Molokan is an exonym used by their Orthodox neighbors. Members tend to identify themselves as Spiritual Christians (духовные христиане, dukhovnye khristiane).

The specific beliefs and practices varied sharply between the various sects of Molokans. Some built chapels for worship, kept sacraments, and revered saints and icons, while others (like the Ikonobortsy, "iconoclasts") discarded these practices in the pursuit of individual approaches to scripture. In general, they rejected the institutionalized formalism of Orthodoxy and denominations with similar doctrines in favor of more emphasis on "Original Christianity" as they understood it. They emphasized spirituality and spiritual practice; such sacramental practices as water baptism have been permitted only as tangible signs and symbols of more important spiritual truths.

Similar to Presbyterians among Protestants, and considered heretical by the Orthodox Church, they elect a council of dominant elders who preserve a sort of apostolic succession in their view. Molokans had some practices similar to the European Quakers and Mennonites, such as pacifism, communal organization, spiritual meetings, and sub-groupings, but they arose in Russia together with the Doukhobors and Sabbatarians (also known as Subbotniks) and similar Spiritual Christian movements of Duhovnye Kristyanye and Ikonobortsy. They migrated into central Russia and Ukraine around the same time. As such, the Molokans have been compared to certain kinds of Protestants (such as Anabaptists and Baptists) because they have multiple similar aspects since they reject the Orthodox priesthood and icons, have their own presbyters, hold the Bible as their main guide and interpret the sacraments "spiritually". They are thus in many ways similar to Anabaptist and Quaker Christians.

== Formation and development ==
=== 11th–14th centuries and origins of milk-drinking during Lent ===
There are approximately 200 fasting days—especially the Great Fast (Lent)—when drinking milk was prohibited by Christian Orthodox ecclesiastical authorities. The practice of milk-drinking during these fasts was first sanctioned by the Nestorian Church in the 11th century in order to accommodate the conversion of some 200,000 Turkic Christians, who lived on meat and milk, to Nestorian Christianity. Two theories emerge regarding the formation of the milk-drinking practice during Lent.

The first one suggests that the Keraite Khan, Markus Buyruk Khan (formerly Sadiq Khan, prior to Christian conversion), had converted to Nestorian Christianity along with around 200,000 of his Turco-Mongolic nomadic tribespeople in 1007. The Keraite people were one of the five dominant Turco-Mongol tribes of the Tatar confederation prior to Genghis Khan. Genghis Khan united the Tatar tribes into the Mongol Empire. The Keraite resided upon the Orkhon Steppes, south of Lake Baikal and north of the Gobi Desert, also referred to as the Altai-Sayan region.

The Nestorian Metropolitan, upon the conversion of the Turco-Mongolic people, asked the Patriarch John VI what the appropriate fast for Lent should be for the new converts and it was decreed that the converts should abstain from meat eating and instead of drinking "soured" milk should consume "sweet" milk. Meat and fermented horse milk were staples of the Turco-Mongolic diet prior to the conversion to Christianity and instead of eliminating a long-held tradition of the nomadic people it was Christianized. Soured milk refers to fermented milk and sweet milk refers to fresh milk.

Arriving in the Rus' lands with the 13th century Tatar (Mongolian) invasion of Batu and Möngke, the practice was adopted by other Christian groups, who had pastoral communities on the Eurasian plains.

The second theory proposes that the Georgian king David IV converted 40,000 Cuman–Kipchak tribal families to Christianity and resettled them in Georgia between 1118 and 1120. David IV assimilated these northern Turkic tribes because he was at war with the Muslim Seljuk Turks to the south and desired to reform his army. Each Kipchak family was required to provide one soldier with a horse and weapons.

The Cumans, Kipchaks, Tatars, Mongolians, and Bashkirs (who descend from Kipchaks) all have the tradition of making fermented milk products. The Cumans call it kumis, Mongolians call it airag, Tatars call it azegay, and the Baskir call it azekay. This lends itself to the possibility of the second theory, as well as the first.

One hundred families of the original Molokan Karaits were settled in Halychyna, specifically Lviv, by hostage arrangement between Daniel of Galicia and Batu Khan in 1246.

=== 15th–16th centuries ===
The Judaizers preceded the modern day Molokans. Although they are sometimes also called "Molokans", they constitute an independent movement. Their leader Matvei Dalmatov was tortured to death in a monastery prison by breaking wheel.

In 1428, Crimea became independent and supported the original Molokan-Subbotniks, the Crimean Karaites (Qara-Tatars / Karaylar), who had always played an important role in Mongol politics. The linguistically dominant Church of the East Karait-Tatars, who had similar origins to the Khavars, became "Karaimstvuiuschie" (or Molokan Karaits).

=== 17th–18th centuries ===
The first recorded use of the term "Molokan" appears in the 1670s, in reference to a group of people who had the practice of not fasting as well as eating dairy products during the 200 fasting days stipulated by the Orthodox Church. In Russian, moloko means "milk", and thus this came to be the name for these particular Christians. Nonetheless, these were "Spiritual Christians" who were not directly related to the group later known as "Molokans".

The "Molokans" that are known today by that name split in 1779 and 1780 from the Doukhobors because they thought that the Doukhobors neglected the Bible; in their belief, God had placed the Word directly into their hearts. The Molokans, however, held the written Bible in the highest regard. The founder of the Molokans, Semyon Matveevich Uklein (1733–1809), was a son-in-law of the Doukhobor leader Ilarion Poberokhin (1720–1792) as explained by O. Beznosova: "Soon (approximately in 1779–1780) a group broke away from Pobirohin's disciples. It was led by his son-in-law Semyon Uklein, who did not share the mystical spirit and self-deification of the former leader and defended the need for reliance on the Gospel texts in the organization of church life (Margaritov, 1914). This group (called 'Molokans') became a 'rational' direction of Spiritual Christianity, as opposed to the 'mystics' – 'christoverchestvo' adherents, 'Doukhobors', and 'skoptsy'."

Uklein's Molokans from Tambov energetically proselytized in settlements along the Volga River and Russia's south-eastern frontier, spreading the Molokan faith in the provinces of Orenburg, Saratov, and Astrakhan; Uklein would further continue organizing congregations until his death in 1809.

=== 19th–20th centuries ===
From the intervention of Count Nikolay Zubov in 1795, Molokans were tolerated under Catherine the Great but constrained by strict rules imposed upon them intended to curb community growth. Those who ignored the restrictions were punished in Tsarist Russia as heretics. Molokan evangelists and missionaries suffered imprisonment, banishment, and other forms of punishment. Prohibited from winning converts, the Molokans were forced into endogamy. The government's policy was to send the Molokans away from the center of Russia into the Caucasus (1833) and other outlying areas to prevent their having influence on other peasants; they were sent to Armenia, Azerbaijan and Georgia (1834), Ukraine (1830s), central Asia, and Siberia, where many communities have survived into the present.

It is said that in 1900, despite the persecutions by the Tsarist government and Orthodox Church, there could have been about a half-million Spiritual Christians in the Russian empire. These figures appear, however, to be vastly exaggerated. In 1912, there were only 133,935 Molokane and 4,844 Pryguny counted in Russia (census of the Department of Spiritual Affairs).

Fewer than one thousand Molokane fled Russia in the early 1900s (mostly 1905–1912), many of whom settled near other non-Orthodox immigrants from Russia in an ethnic enclave on and near Potrero Hill in San Francisco, where they built a prayer hall in 1929. A second prayer hall was established near Sheridan to serve those scattered elsewhere in Northern California. There has been a population of Molokans in Whittier in Southern California. As of 2022, there is still a church called New United Molokan Church.

Though some Spiritual Christian faith groups fled Russia in the early 1900s to avoid the military draft, all eligible Molokan boys registered for the Selective Service Act of 1917, but were disqualified as aliens who did not speak English. During World War II, 136 eligible American Molokan boys enlisted during World War II, and two were conscientious objectors.

Being prohibited from winning converts under the laws of the Russian Empire, they adopted endogamy and were classified as an ethnic group under the Bolsheviks.

== Groups ==
From 1904 to the 1920s, many different faith tribes in the Caucasus immigrated to North America under the guise of "Molokan". In 1899, when about a third of all Dukhobortsty left the Caucasus to central Canada, the Canadian government also gave permission for "Molokans" to migrate and get the same privileges (land, communal, non-military). To take advantage of this generous privilege, many different faith tribes of spiritual Christians in the Caucasus all claimed to be "Molokan" while leaving Russia for Canada. Most all were diverted from Canada to Los Angeles by Peter Demens, where they clashed, never uniting. Many descendants of those different tribes still claim the coveted Molokan heritage label which perpetuates confusion.

=== Constant Molokans and Molokan Jumpers ===
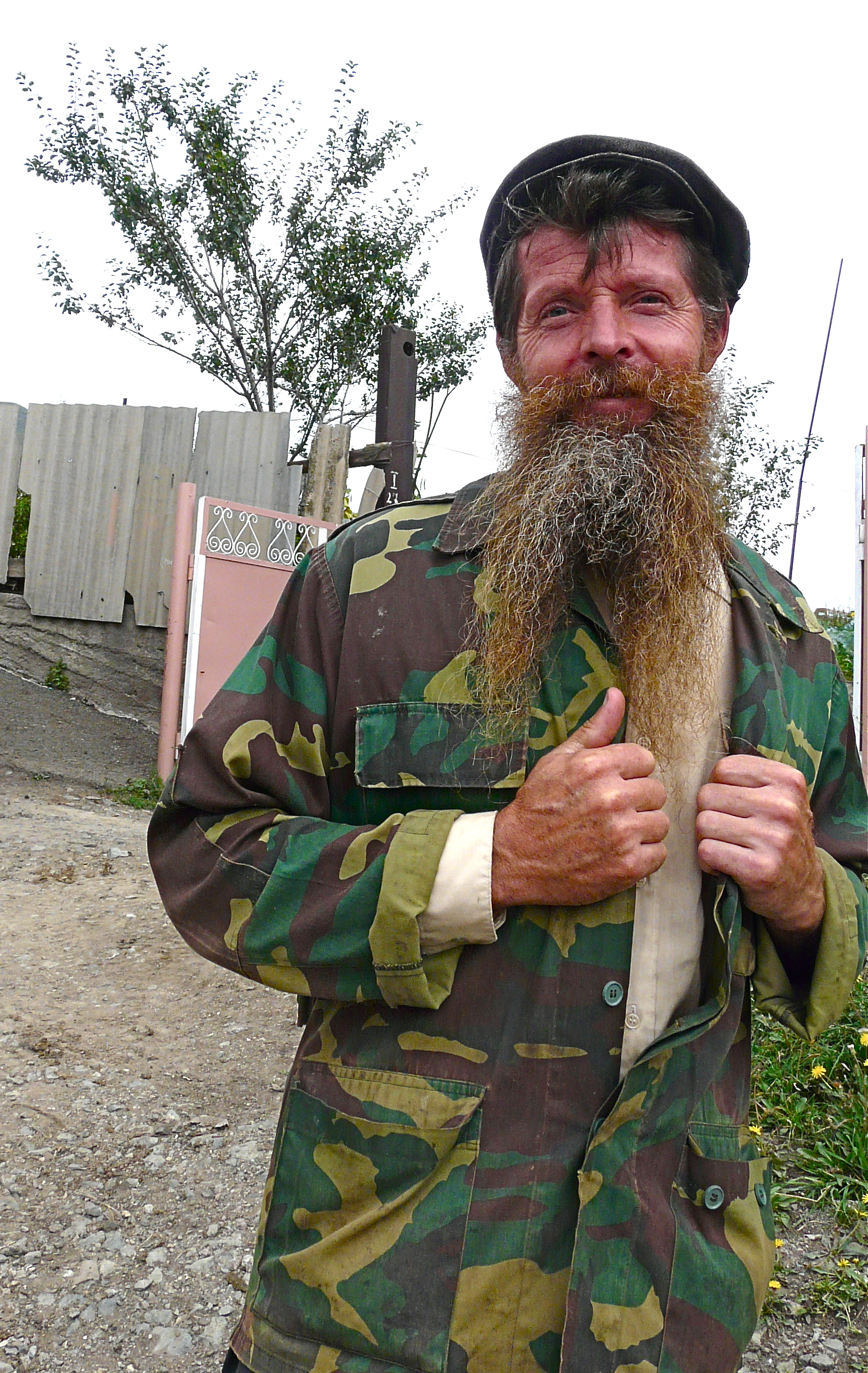
A Molokan villager in Fioletovo, Armenia

The Russian term "constant" (invariable, steadfast, unchanged, original: postoyanniye : постоянние) applied to the Molokans has been used with two different intentions. Original Molokans either refused to be evangelized by Protestant denominations or insisted that they would retain their faith unchanged by the "Jumper" revivalist movement in the 1830s. They originally constituted the by far largest segment of Molokanism. In 1833, a schism occurred that was framed by collective cataclysms of disease, famine, and persecution.

A portion of the Molokans during this time began to experience a charismatic outpouring of the Holy Spirit, similar to later Pentecostal faiths. Eventually this sect evolved into what is known today as the "Molokan Jumpers". The old Molokans were termed Constants (Postoyaniye), and the newly evolved "Molokans jumpers" (Pryguny), also called Skakuny (leapers). The Molokan Jumpers believed they were visited by a manifestation of the Holy Spirit, and this new smaller Molokan sect began a revival with intense zeal, reporting miracles that purportedly rivaled those of Christ's apostles.

=== Seeds of exodus ===
The "Constant" Molokan sect condemned the new sect to authorities, resulting in betrayals and imprisonment for many of the Molokan Jumpers. Some of these Molokan Jumpers called themselves "New Israelites", when one Prygun leader Maxim Rudomyotkin in Nikitino, Erivan Guberniya was announced to be the "King of the Spirits" in 1853. The group, also known as Maximists", considered Efim Gerasimovich Klubnikin (1842-1915) in Romanovka, Kars oblast, a divinely inspired 12-year-old boy prophet. He prophesied a "coming time that would be unbearable and that the time to leave Russia was now."

During the early 20th century under his leadership, about 2,000 Pryguny emigrated to the United States, first settling on the east side of Los Angeles. Most seeking rural isolation moved to Baja Mexico, then Arizona, Central California, and some other parts of the West Coast and Canada. Other Jumpers received a land grant from the Mexican government and settled in the Guadalupe Valley in Baja California, Mexico.

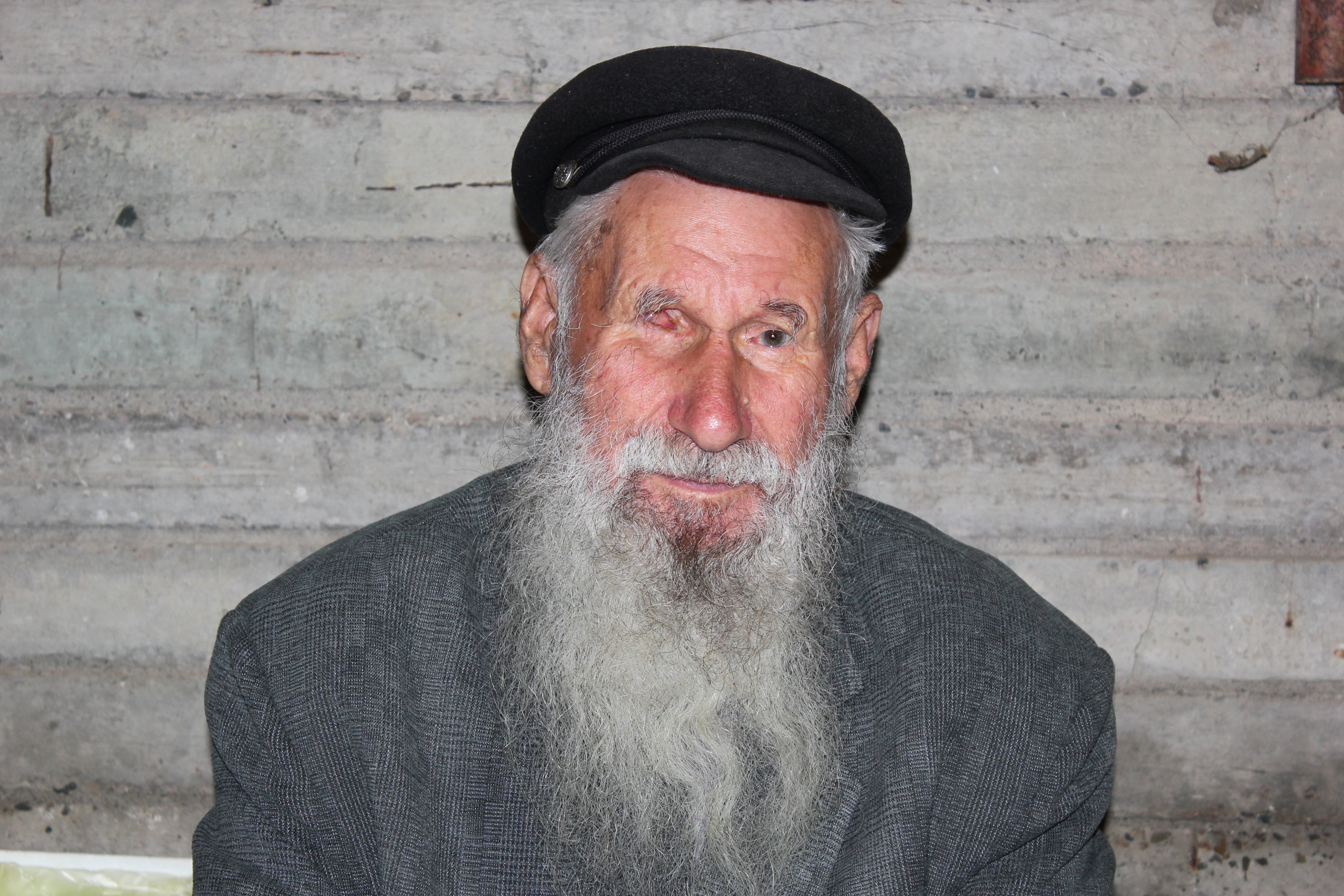
Presbyter of Molokans of Ivanovka village, Azerbaijan

In Los Angeles, a small number of the Molokan Jumpers joined the development of the American Revival called "the Pentecostal Azusa Street Revival." The founder of The Full Gospel Business Men's Association associates this Pentecostal Revival to a child prophet of the Molokan Jumpers, E.G. Klubnikin.

=== Diaspora ===
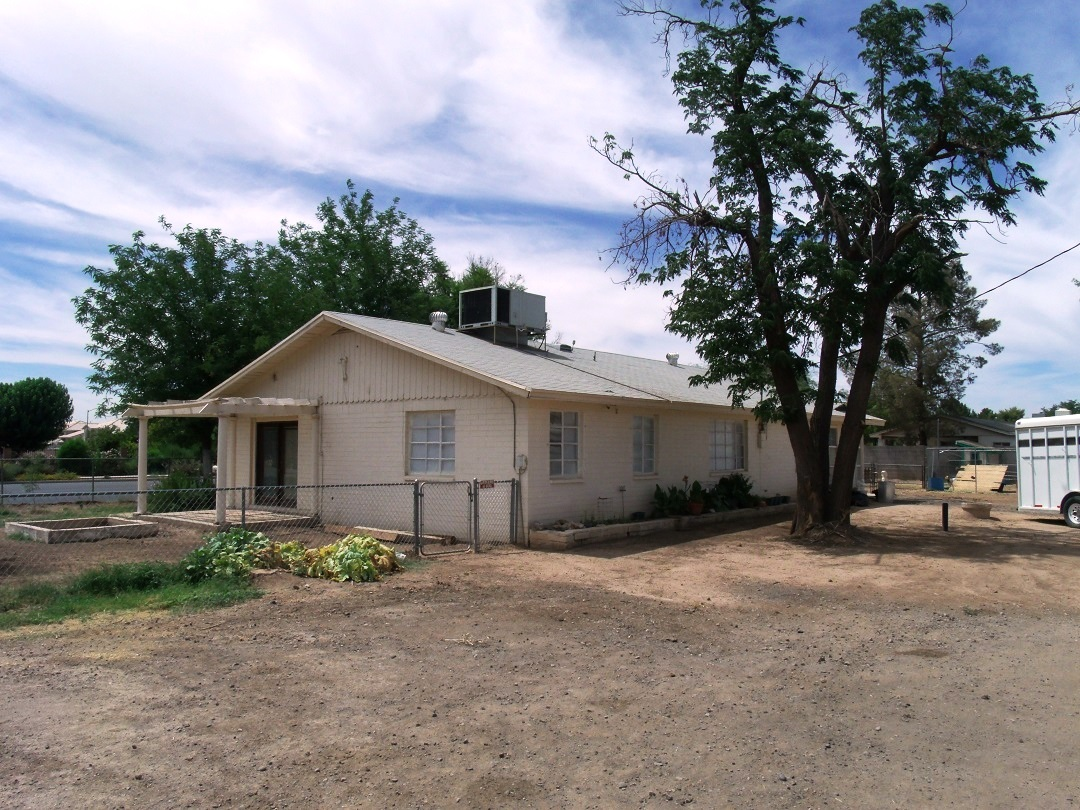
The first Russian Molokans Church (Spiritual Christians) in Glendale, Arizona was built in 1950 and is located at 7402 Griffin Ave. It is listed as a historical site by the Glendale Arizona Historical Society.

About 20,000 people identify as Molokans, at least ethnically, in the former Soviet Union. There are approximately 200 Molokan churches, 150 of them in Russia and Azerbaijan. They also lived in the North Caucasus, Southern Ukraine, Armenia, and Central Asia, where their ancestors had been exiled long ago.

Approximately 25,000 Molokans reside in the United States, of whom about 5,000 "ethnically" identify as "Molokans". The majority live in or near Los Angeles and Fresno, particularly in East Los Angeles, Boyle Heights, and Commerce.

During the 1960s other Molokans settled in southern Alaska and Australia. Molokans are said to be numerous in Australia. The majority are in South Australia, with a number of families in Western Australia and a small group residing in Queensland. Over 1,000 reside in Canada in the province of British Columbia and hundreds more in Alberta, keeping their traditional communal lifestyle. A group of Molokan families are also living in Latin America in the Guadalupe Valley, Mexico and in the country of Uruguay.

A small Molokan community was located in the eastern province of Kars, Turkey. They are known as Kars Molokans. Most of the community returned to Russia years ago; in the 21st century only one family of Molokans is left in Kars.

== Spiritual practices ==
The Molokans have been compared to the Anabaptists that originated through the Radical Reformation and to the Quakers. They have a protestant-like view of the authority of scripture, but interpreting the bible allegorically or "spiritually", they see the sacraments "spiritually", reject the use of icons, images of the cross, and Church hierarchy along with venerating the saints. The Molokans advocate for pacifism, congregate in their own homes, do not drink or smoke, and oppose contraception and modern technology.

The Molokans follow the Old Testament laws, refusing to eat pork, shellfish, or unclean foods, they additionally refused to obey Orthodox mandates on fasting.

== Racial, ethnic, and familial lineage ==
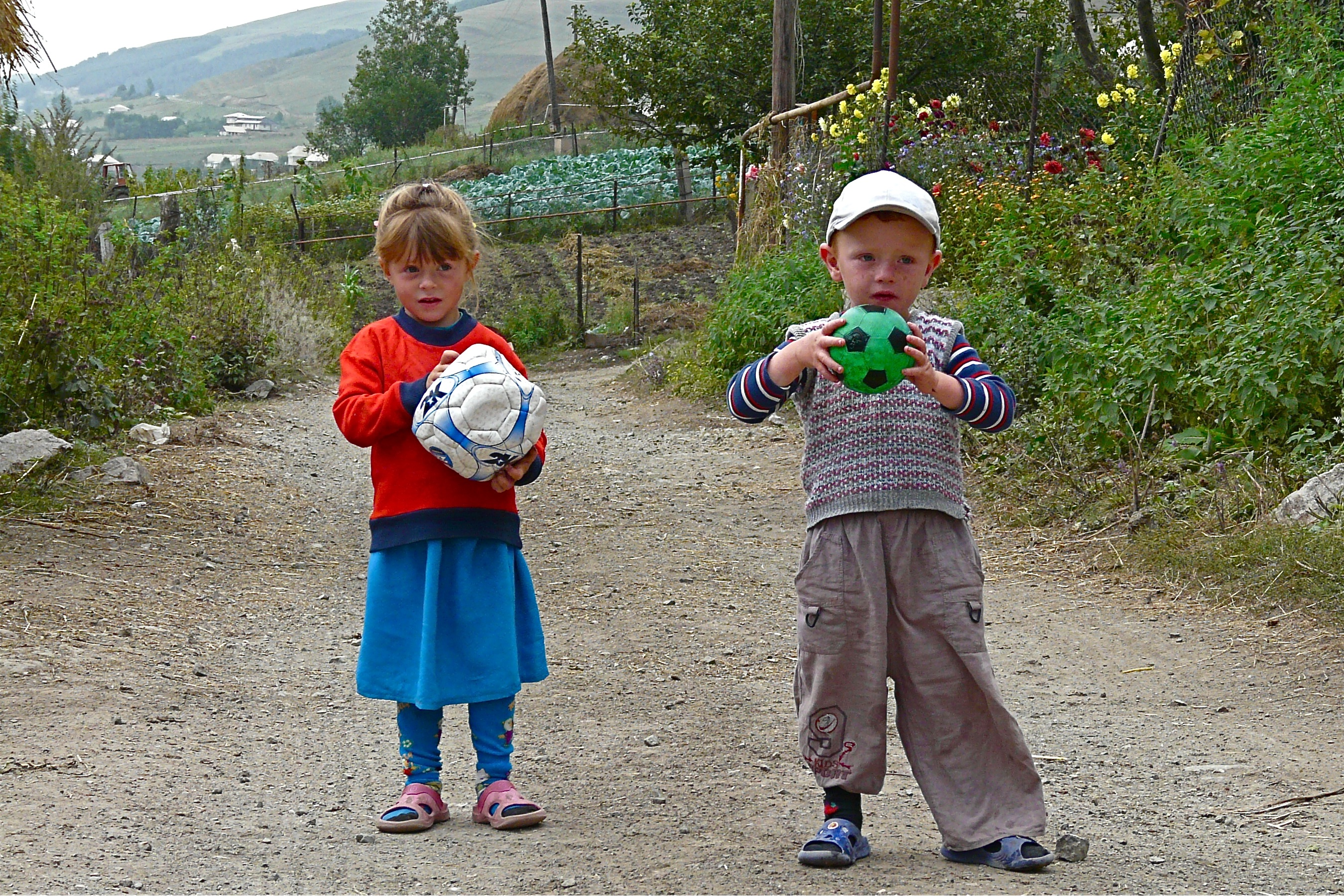
Molokan children in Armenia

The Molokans from Tambov who proselytized in settlements along the Volga River and in the Orenburg, Saratov and Astrakhan provinces were mostly of Slavic descent. Tambov Oblast had been completely settled by Slavic people by the 17th century. The regions they proselytized in all had or still have high populations of Islamic adherents and people of 'Tatar' or Turkic ancestry.

Between the 1600s and late 1800s, intermarriage between ethnic Russians and Tatars (Tatar at this point meaning anyone of Turkic background) was common. For a Tatar, marrying a Russian was a way to increase social status or class. Muslim Tatars who converted to Christianity were exempted from taxes and gained other privileges.

Molokans as partially an admixture of Slavic and Turkic genetics is also supported by other accounts. Molokans complicated the work of the Eastern Orthodox Church in the conversion of Tatar or Turkic Muslims, as Molokans taught that religious iconography was a sin. Molokans are well-known iconoclasts, which was heresy to the Orthodox Church. Muslims, also being iconoclasts, found a draw to the Molokan faith as it preserved some Islamic traditions. Muslim converts in Russia were also well known to convert to Christianity to receive the benefits of conversion, only to convert back to Islam later. Molokans, being constrained to endogamy and marrying within their religion, would marry converts indiscriminate of their genetic background.

== In the United States ==
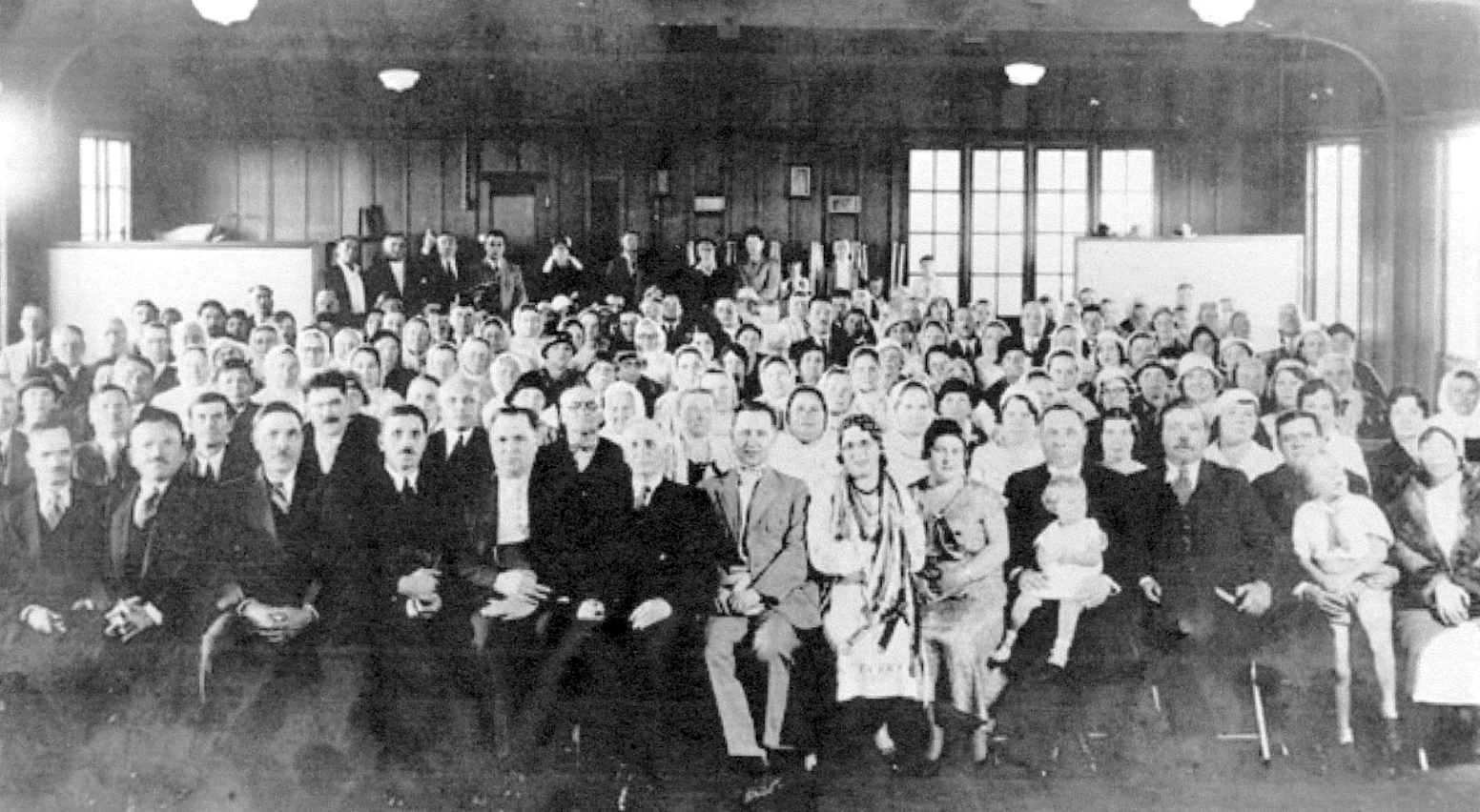
Molokan Russian immigrants at the Potrero Hill Neighborhood House, San Francisco, California

=== History ===
Roughly 3,500 Molokans left Russia between 1901 and 1911 in search of religious freedom, escaping the persecution inflicted upon them by the Russian Orthodox Church and state. Starting around the early 1900s, many Molokans settled in the Potrero Hill neighborhood of San Francisco, California. The Potrero Hill Neighborhood House was built in 1922 by the California Synodical Society of Home Mission, Inc. and the Presbyterian Church, in order to support this newfound community, provided adult education classes, a community center, and a kindergarten. By the 1970s, the Potrero Hill community was still in existence, but other smaller groups of the Molokans had become assimilated into the broader Russian-American community.

Today, Molokans in the United States are largely assimilated into the general mainstay of American culture. They do however work to preserve the uniqueness of their own traditions and culture, such as the usage of Russian in their church services, community dinners (referred to as 'obed'), and a shared adherence to diet based upon their religious beliefs.

=== Perception by others ===
Upon their arrival in the USA, the Molokans and their religious observances seemed very strange to Americans. The Molokan colonies and communities were labeled "cults" and Molokans were harassed by Americans with the creation of the derogatory term "Molokan Slackers". The Molokans were given this moniker primarily because they did not want to serve in World War I, as they were conscientious objectors.

=== Conscription ===
On June 8, 1917, the Arizona Republic reported that the Molokan community in Glendale, Arizona, refused to register under the Selective Service Act of 1917. The likely result would be the arrest of Molokan men who refused to sign the order. Molokans claimed that their religious precepts forbade them from signing such an agreement. The Czars had forced them into the military, and that is why they had fled Russia for the United States. The Molokans feared that history would repeat itself in America.

On August 9, 1917, The Daily Missoulian reported that 35 Molokans were arrested and given sentences of one year each for disobeying the Selective Service Act of 1917. Thirty-three other Molokans were arrested for creating a disturbance outside of the jail house; women struck police with their umbrellas and a knife-wielding man had to be overpowered. After the 35 men were sentenced, the Molokans in the courtroom broke out into ecstatic singing and dancing and some participants were slightly injured while being subdued.

=== Naming after immigration ===
Molokans are known for having different spellings of last names within the same immediate family for a few reasons. When Molokans arrived in the United States, some family names were horribly misspelled by immigration officials who could not read Cyrillic—for example, "Сусоев" became "Sessoyeff," which is unpronounceable in English. Also, like members of other pacifist communities, some Molokans changed the spelling of their names to avoid deportation.

Many chose to use American versions of their names. So "Vasilli Bukroff" becomes "Bill" or "William Bukroff" or "Ivan Metchikoff" becomes "John Mitchell", and "Dunya Tikunov" becomes "Julie Tyler". They sometimes use "first names" that are not their legal names and are based on nicknames from childhood within the church that stuck with people as adults. For example, "Hazel Valov" became known as "Percy Valov" for being very "persistent".

Another naming custom that can confuse those who are unfamiliar with the community was practiced by Molokans who settled in the Guadalupe Valley, Mexico. Many settlers adopted the Mexican versions of their names, so Rodion Pavlov became "Rodolfo Pabloff," and they named their children following the Mexican format. Accordingly, one will see what would have been a Russian name like "Ivan Pavilovich Pabloff" (Ivan son of Pavil (Paul) (Pavlov)), whose mother's maiden name is "Samarin," become "Juan Pablo Pabloff de Samarin" or "Juan Samarin Pabloff".

In all these instances, tracing family history can be very difficult. Otherwise, they adhere to the common naming practices. Much can be learned from a Russian headstone which will commonly go back to the use of the Russian naming protocol regardless of what name the individual used while alive. If translated correctly, one can learn the names of an individual's father and grandfather from a male's headstone. If it is displayed in English at the bottom it most likely will not contain the information.

== Ecumenical relations ==
In Russia, the Molokane historically maintained close relations with Baptists.

== Notable people ==
- Voronin, Nikita Isaevitj, was founder and first presbyter for the Baptist congregation in Tiflis
- Ivan Prokhanov, religious figure, engineer, poet, preacher,
- Lou Novikoff, professional baseball player
- Jim Loscutoff, professional basketball player
- Matvey Skobelev, Marxist revolutionary and politician
- Shirley Babashoff, Olympic swimming champion

== See also ==
- Spiritual Christianity
- Subbotniks
- Doukhobor
- Christian anarchism
- Peace church
- List of pacifist faiths
- Simple living
