= Susan Leal =

American water utility consultant and author

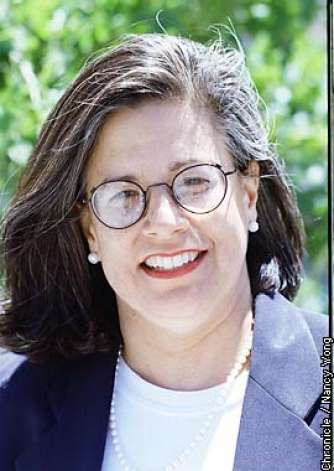

Member of the San Francisco Board of Supervisors from District 8
- In office June 1993 – 1997
- Mayor: Frank Jordan; Willie Brown
- Preceded by: Roberta Achtenberg
- Succeeded by: Mark Leno
- Constituency: 8th district

San Francisco Treasurer
- In office 1997–2004
- Preceded by: Mary Callanan
- Succeeded by: José Cisneros

General Manager of the San Francisco Public Utilities Commission
- In office August 2004 – March 2008
- Succeeded by: Ed Harrington

Personal details
- Born: October 11, 1949 (age 76) San Francisco, California
- Education: University of California at Berkeley (BA)(JD)
- Website: https://www.susanleal.com/

Susan Leal (born October 11, 1949) is an American water utility consultant and the co-author of the book Running Out of Water. Formerly, she was the General Manager of the San Francisco Public Utilities Commission, San Francisco Treasurer, and a San Francisco supervisor.

== Early life and education ==
Leal was born the youngest of three on October 11, 1949, to Mexican immigrant parents in San Francisco. She grew up in Eureka Valley. Leal graduated from Presentation High School in 1967; the Catholic prep school was founded in 1915 by the Sisters of the Presentation, and it closed in 1991. (The site is now part of the campus of University of San Francisco).

Leal attended University of California, Berkeley, where she received a bachelor's degree in economics in 1971 and a Juris Doctor in 1975. San Francisco Supervisor Bevan Dufty was a classmate of hers at Cal.

== Career ==
After graduation, Leal worked for IBM's legal department. From 1976 to 1982, Leal was a staff attorney for the United States House Committee Interstate and Foreign Commerce subcommittee. In 1982, she was a senior consultant to the California State Assembly's Committee on Ways and Means under Assembly Speaker Willie Brown. In 1985, Leal became vice-president of a health care management company.

=== San Francisco elections ===
Leal was appointed to the San Francisco Board of Supervisors in June 1993 by Mayor Frank Jordan. She was re-elected the following year to a four-year term. While on the Board, she chaired its Finance Committee. Leal was the co-author (with Tom Ammiano and Leslie Rachel Katz) of the city's Equal Benefits Ordinance, which provides equal benefits to employees and their unmarried domestic partners. It requires companies which do business with the City and County of San Francisco to provide the same benefits.

From 1997 to 2004, Leal served as Treasurer of San Francisco, winning re-election in 2001. Her duties as Treasurer also included managing all tax and revenue collection for San Francisco as well as managing billions of dollars in short-term revenue. She introduced the first socially responsible investment portfolio among California’s 58 counties. Her socially-responsible portfolio’s return on investments surpassed the other 57 other California counties during her tenure. She helped increase tax collection rates, including a 91% increase in delinquent revenue collection, representing tens of millions in additional revenue. Leal spearheaded the city's e-commerce initiative, which was named one of the top e-government projects nationwide and helped launched the nation's first audio ATM for the visually impaired.

Leal was a candidate in the 2003 San Francisco mayoral election. She lost in the general election and endorsed Gavin Newsom, who later won in the runoff election.

=== San Francisco Public Utilities Commission ===
In 2004, Leal was appointed General Manager of the San Francisco Public Utilities Commission (SFPUC), the county's utilities agency, by Mayor Newsom, though she had no experience in the utilities field prior to this appointment.

During her term, Leal implemented SFGreasecycle – a biodiesel fuel program that collects waste oil and grease to run San Francisco's fleet of vehicles and keep it out of the city's sewer system. She upgraded the Bay Area's seismically unsafe water system and initiated a program to update San Francisco's wastewater system. The Commission installed tanks of bluegills at the Millbrae water treatment plant to measure water safety and detect nonbiological threats in the water supply, as mandated by anti-terrorism federal law. It was also in talks to pay $58 million to build a new power plant in Hunters Point, San Francisco to supplement the Hunters Point Power Plant.

The Commission's governing board voted unanimously to fire Leal in February 2008. Although the board did not cite a reason, Commissioner Dick Sklar expressed disappointment in Leal's handling of the power plant negotiations. She was succeeded by City Controller Ed Harrington. Following her departure, the Board of Supervisors declared April 2008 "Susan Leal Month" for her service to the city.

=== Subsequent work ===
Leal joined Harvard University as a senior fellow of the Advanced Leadership Initiative, where she researched the delivery of potable water and treatment of wastewater in communities worldwide.

== Personal life ==
Leal is gay.

== Book ==
- Rogers, Peter P.; Leal, Susan (2010). Running out of water: the looming crisis and solutions to conserve our most precious resource. New York: Palgrave Macmillan. ISBN 978-0-230-61564-9.

Political offices
Preceded by Roberta Achtenberg	Member of the San Francisco Board of Supervisors; District 8; 1993-1998	Succeeded by Mark Leno
Preceded by Mary Callanan	San Francisco Treasurer; 1997-2004	Succeeded by José Cisneros
