= Mark Leno =

American politician (born 1951)

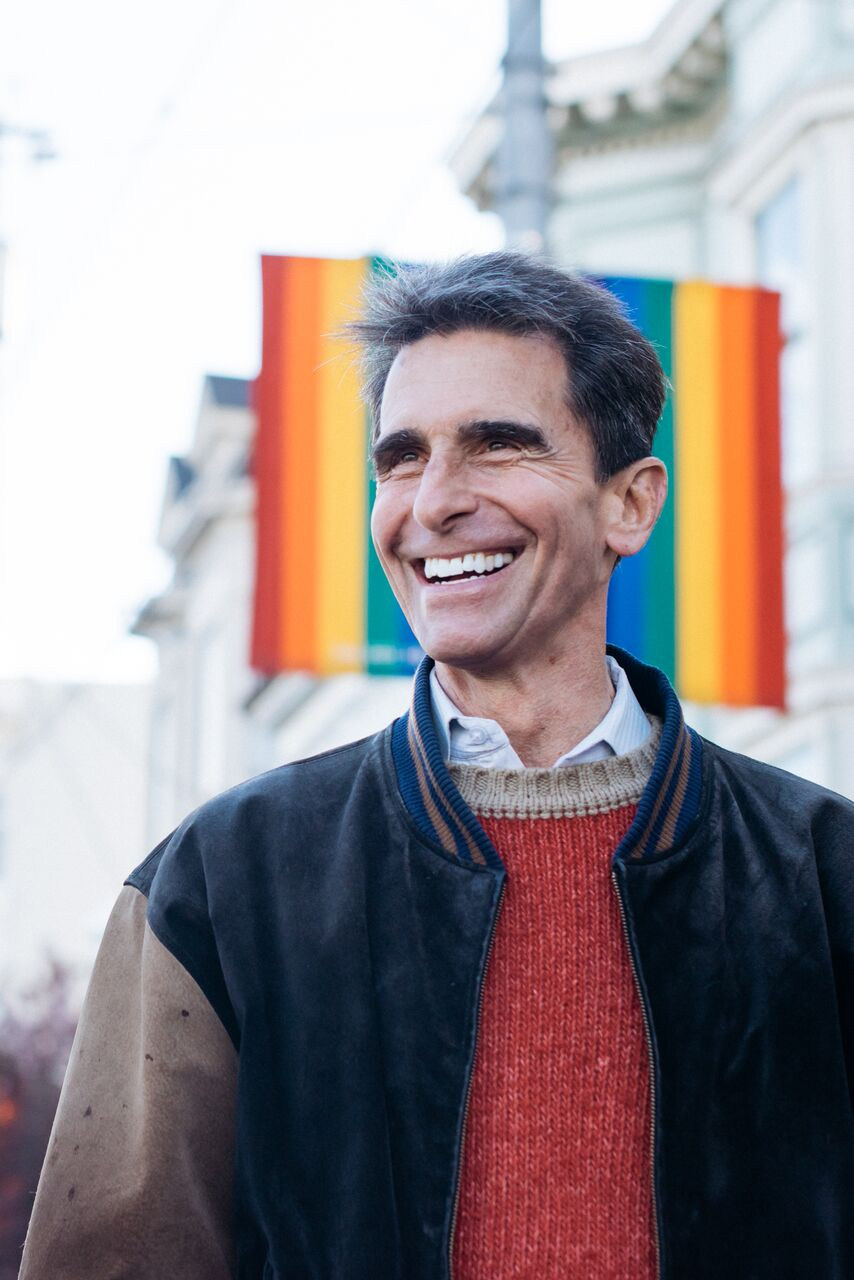

Member of the California State Senate
- In office December 1, 2008 – November 30, 2016
- Preceded by: Carole Migden
- Succeeded by: Scott Wiener
- Constituency: 3rd district (2008–2012); 11th district (2012–2016)

Member of the California State Assembly from the 13th district
- In office December 2, 2002 – November 30, 2008
- Preceded by: Carole Migden
- Succeeded by: Tom Ammiano

Member of the San Francisco Board of Supervisors
- In office April 22, 1998 – December 2, 2002
- Preceded by: Susan Leal
- Succeeded by: Bevan Dufty
- Constituency: At-large district (1998–2001); 8th district (2001–2002)

Personal details
- Born: September 24, 1951 (age 74) Milwaukee, Wisconsin, U.S.
- Party: Democratic
- Domestic partner: Douglas Jackson (deceased)
- Education: Jerusalem University College (BA)

Mark Leno (born September 24, 1951) is an American politician who served consecutively in both houses of the California State Legislature from 2002 to 2016. A Democrat, he represented the 11th Senate district, which includes San Francisco and portions of San Mateo County, from 2012 to 2016. Until the 2010 redistricting came into effect, he represented the 3rd Senate district (2008–2012). Prior to being elected to the State Senate in 2008, Leno served in the California State Assembly, representing the 13th district.

A member of the California Legislative LGBT Caucus, Leno was the first openly gay man elected to the State Senate. He was previously one of the first two openly gay men (along with John Laird) to serve in the California State Assembly.

Before his time in the Legislature, he served as a member of the San Francisco Board of Supervisors from 1998 to 2002. Leno is the owner of Budget Signs Inc., a small business; following his departure from the Legislature he was a candidate in the 2018 San Francisco mayoral special election, which he narrowly lost to London Breed.

== Early life and education ==
Leno is the grandson of Russian Jewish immigrants. A native of Milwaukee, Wisconsin, he attended Nicolet High School and later the University of Colorado at Boulder. He was valedictorian of his graduating class at the American College in Jerusalem, where he earned his Bachelor of Arts degree. Leno also spent two years in rabbinical studies at Hebrew Union College in New York. Afterward, he moved to San Francisco on the invitation of his sister (Jamie Leno Zimron). He lived his first four years in the Tenderloin before moving to the Noe Valley neighborhood.

In 1978, Leno started Budget Signs as owner and operator. The business incorporated in 1982. Working with his life partner, Douglas Jackson, the business continued to grow and their involvement in community affairs steadily expanded. Jackson died from complications related to AIDS in 1990.

== Career ==
Prior to his election, his political background included raising money for candidates and causes such as AIDS services, the San Francisco LGBT Community Center, the U.S. Holocaust Memorial Museum, and the Democratic Party.

=== Board of Supervisors ===
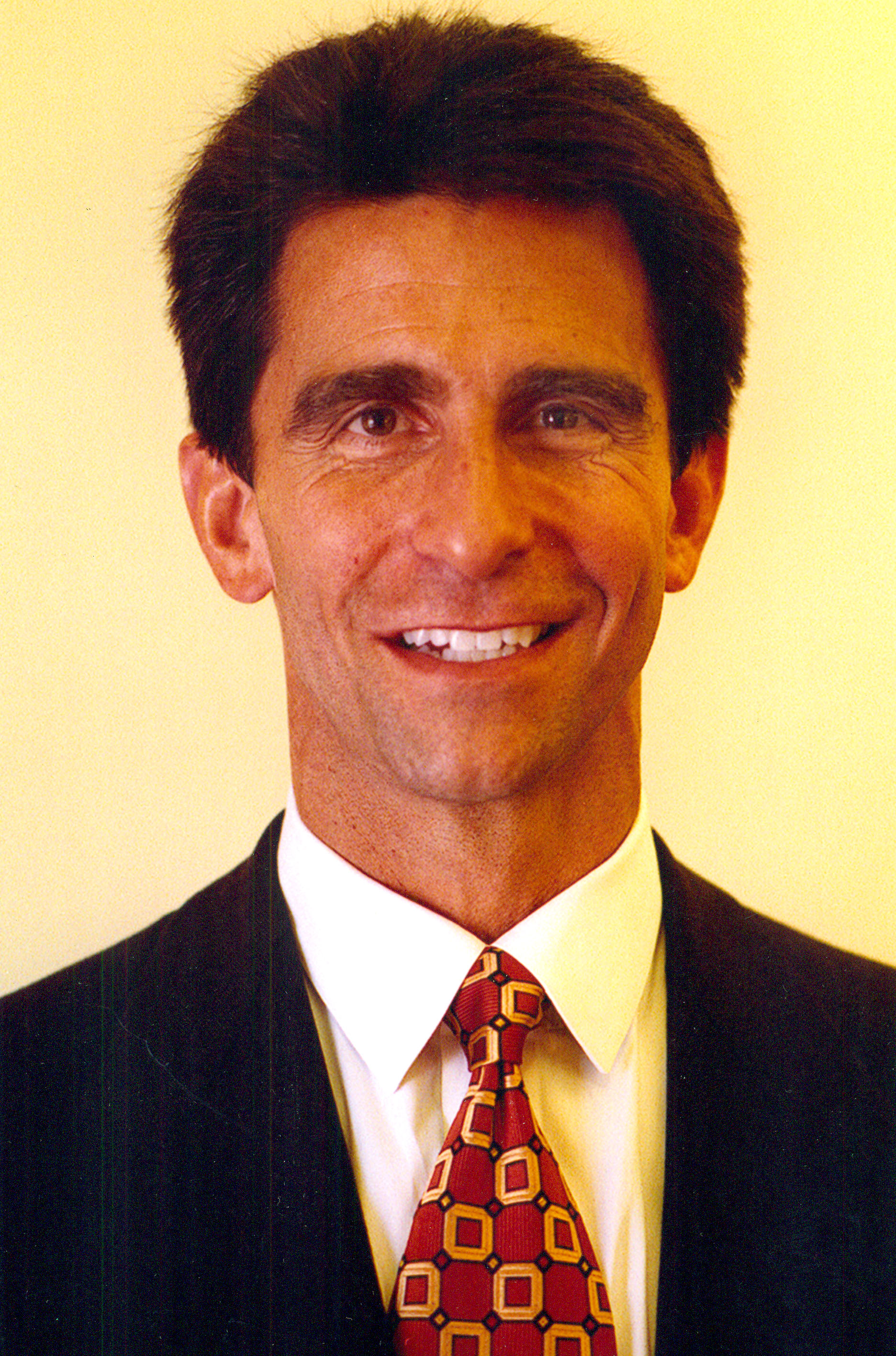
Mark Leno as a member of the SF Board of Supervisors in his office at City Hall, 1999

Leno was appointed to the San Francisco Board of Supervisors by Willie Brown in April 1998. He was elected citywide to the San Francisco Board of Supervisors in November 1998 and re-elected in the reinstated district races of 2000. Leno's district included The Castro, Noe Valley, Glen Park, Diamond Heights, Twin Peaks, Duboce Triangle, and the westernmost part of the Mission District.

Leno introduced legislation to allow tenants to replace a roommate without losing their lease, measures to aid those with HIV/AIDS, and a measure to promote the federal Earned Income Tax Credit to help low income residents. He authored legislation to ban mercury thermometers, one of the first such proposals in the country. In 2000, as a supervisor, he supported Proposition L, the slow-growth measure and authored legislation to protect neighborhood business districts from big box retail. He was a statewide spokesman for the No on Proposition 22 campaign.

In 2001, Leno successfully introduced an ordinance providing equal access to the city's health plan for transgender employees of San Francisco.

=== State Assembly ===
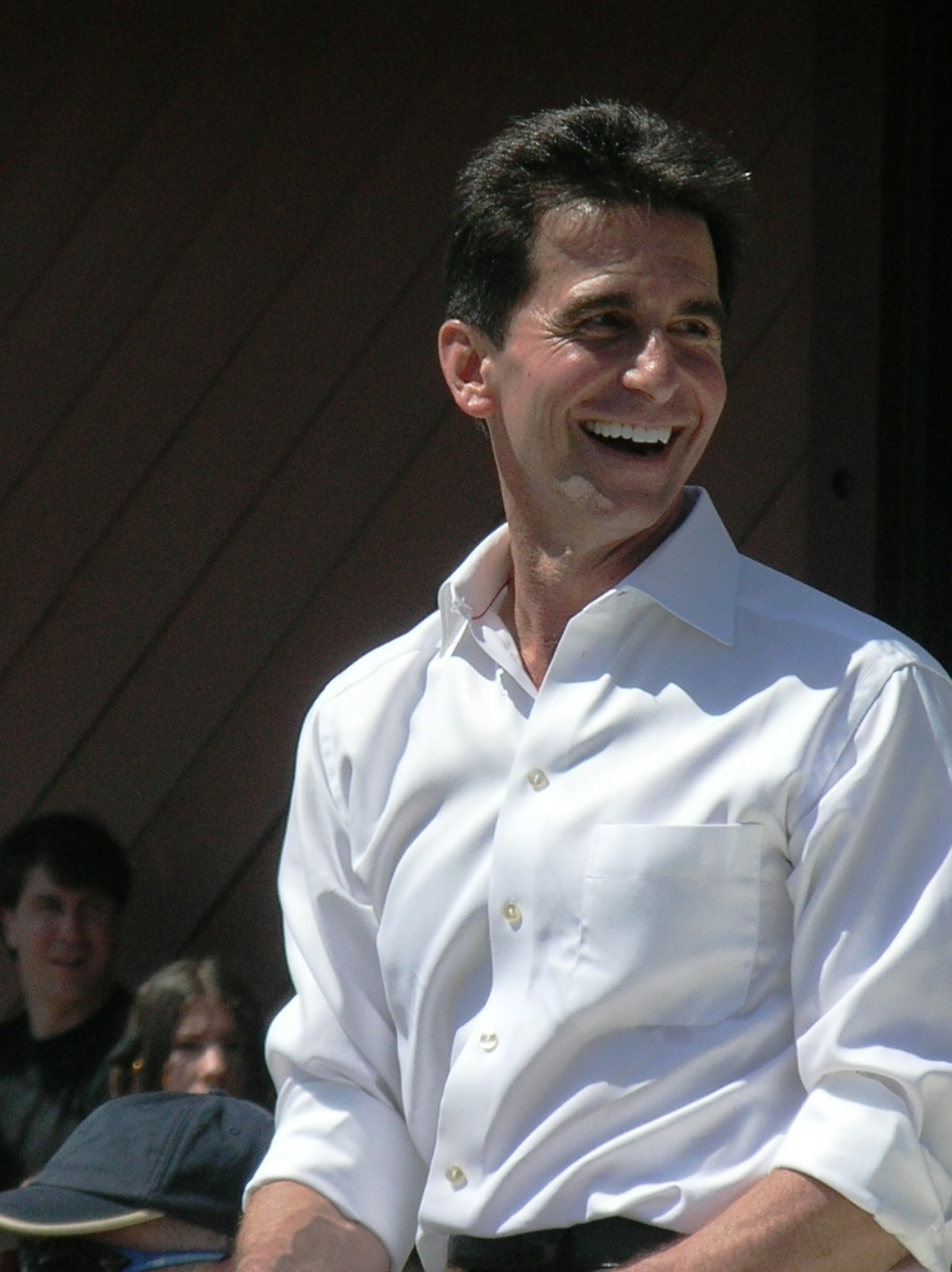
Leno at the Northern California Cherry Blossom Festival in April 2010

Leno was elected to the California State Assembly in 2002 and was re-elected in 2004 and 2006. He was the chair of the Assembly's Appropriations Committee, as well as the Select Committee on Childhood Obesity & Related Diabetes.

In 2005, Leno authored AB 849, a bill legalizing same-sex marriages that became the first bill of its kind to pass a legislative body in the United States. The bill passed both the Assembly and the State Senate but was vetoed by Governor Schwarzenegger. In 2007, Leno introduced AB 43, the Religious Freedom and Civil Marriage Protection Act, that would have allowed for same-sex marriage. This bill passed the Assembly and Senate but was again vetoed by Governor Arnold Schwarzenegger. Same-sex marriage was legalized by the California Supreme Court in a May 2008 decision, becoming effective June 16, 2008.

In 2006, Leno and Republican Assemblyman Chuck DeVore co-authored a bill that would legalize the cultivation of non-psychoactive hemp. The bill does not conflict with the federal Controlled Substances Act and would mandate that hemp be tested to ensure it is non-psychoactive. He authored California Assembly Bill Number AB 1668, on February 23, 2007 — a bill encouraging Open Document Formats ODF in California.

In Leno's first two terms in the Assembly, 58 of his bills were signed into law. He co-authored AB 32 to cap greenhouse emissions. He authored AB 706 to prohibit the use of fire retardants in upholstered furniture. He authored AB 2573 to allow San Francisco public utilities to install solar panels on public infrastructure. He also authored Assembly Bill 1358, the California Complete Streets Act, to require cities and counties to consider including walking and bicycling in their general plans. He coauthored the AB 583, California Clean Money and Fair Elections Act, to bring public financing to political campaigns.

=== State Senate ===
In 2008, he won the Democratic Party nomination for California's 3rd Senate district with 43.8 percent of the vote, defeating incumbent Senator Carole Migden, who had 28.6 percent of the vote, and former Assemblyman Joe Nation, who had 27.6 percent of the vote. Leno was a principal co-author of SB 840, the Single-Payer Universal Health Care Act, which would have provided health care coverage for all Californians and would have replaced hundreds of health insurance companies with state-provided coverage.

During his 14-year term in the State Legislature, Leno authored numerous bills including:

- SB 810, the California Universal Health Care Act.
- The Airline Passenger Bill of Rights. The bill requires airlines to provide basic needs for passengers, such as water, snacks, fresh air, sanitary restrooms, and lights if a plane is delayed on a tarmac at a California airport.
- A state constitutional amendment regarding the Public Records Act. The amendment clarifies that local governments must comply with requests for publicly available documents, and requires local governments to pay in full the costs of those requests. The amendment was approved by voters in the November 2014 election as Proposition 42.
- The Fair Education Act, which ensures LGBT and disabled people are included in social science history curriculum.
- Legislation to require disclosure of the use or absence of flame retardant chemicals on existing furniture labels.
- A smartphone "kill switch bill", requiring phones sold in the state to include an anti-theft technology.
- Legislation to establish Harvey Milk Day in California, making California the first state in the nation to officially honor the civil rights activist.
- SB 178, the California Electronic Communications Privacy Act which strengthened the digital privacy rights of California citizens.
- The state's minimum wage increase to $15 per hour in 2022.
- Legislation to limit and restrict the use of solitary confinement in juvenile facilities.
- Legislation to add electronic cigarettes to the state's existing smoke-free laws and require the packaging to be child-resistant.
- California's first major reform of the state's public utilities commission.
- Legislation to exempt Single Room Occupancy units from the Ellis Act.
- The California Community Corrections Performance Incentive Act of 2009, which helps reduce California's prison admissions.

== Awards and honors ==
Leno has been recognized by LGBT organizations, civil rights advocacy groups, and non-profits throughout his tenure for his commitment to public service and for authoring legislation to combat discrimination, protect the rights of all Californians, and lift millions out of poverty.

In 2003, Leno earned recognition from the American Heart Association, the California Association of Food Banks and Parents, Families and Friends of Lesbians and Gays. In 2004, Leno received the Award of Courage from American Foundation for AIDS Research and was honored by the Lesbian and Gay Lawyers Association of Los Angeles at their 25th Anniversary. Also in 2004, Leno (and Chris Reynolds and Steve Sampson) received a President's Award as part of the Pantheon of Leather Awards. Leno was the first out leatherman to be a state legislator in the United States. He also served as Chair of the California Legislative LGBT Caucus.

In 2005, he was honored by the California Attorneys For Criminal Justice with their Scales of Justice Award in recognition to his fair and balanced approach in chairing the Assembly Public Safety Committee. He received the "Lifetime Friend and Champion" award from the Harvey Milk Lesbian, Gay, Bisexual, Transgender Democratic Club and was chosen by OUT Magazine as one of 2005's "Most Intriguing Gay Men." In 2006, he was honored by the Stonewall Democratic Club in Los Angeles with their Sheila Kuehl Trail Blazer Award, the Lazarus Project's Lazarus Award for Marriage Equality, the California Young Democrats' Mentor of the Year, Partners Ending Domestic Abuse's Kamala Harris Leadership Award, and Temple Beth Chayim Chadashim's 2006 Herman Humanitarian Award.

In 2011, the Consumer Attorneys of California presented him with the Leadership of the Year Award and he received the Transgender Law Center's Community Ally Award in 2010. He received the California Community Choice Aggregation Champion award in 2014 for his dedication to green energy by Marin Clean Energy.

In 2015, he received the leadership award from the Northern California Innocence Project for advancing legislation to prevent wrongful conviction and the Women's Human Rights Award by Friends of the Commission on the Status of Women.

In 2016, he was recognized by the Coachella Valley Harvey Milk Diversity Coalition for his leadership on LGBT issues, the Mental Health Association of San Francisco for his work on mental health issues, the Western Center on Law and Poverty for his dedication to public service, and the Electronic Frontier Foundation for his work to protect digital privacy, among other recognitions.

== Electoral history ==
=== San Francisco Board of Supervisors ===
1998 San Francisco Board of Supervisors election
Candidate	Votes	%
Tom Ammiano (incumbent)	120,291	15.0
Gavin Newsom (incumbent)	109,015	13.6
Mabel Teng (incumbent)	95,093	11.9
Mark Leno (incumbent)	82,449	10.3
Amos Brown (incumbent)	67,554	8.4
Victor Marquez	58,935	7.4
Rose Tsai	58,571	7.3
Donna Casey	57,788	7.2
Denise D'Anne	35,244	4.4
Lucrecia Bermudez	23,115	2.9
Shawn O'Hearn	17,664	2.2
Jim Reid	16,902	2.1
Carlos Petroni	16,293	2.0
Len Pettigrew	15,049	1.9
Tahnee Stair	11,621	1.4
Frederick Hobson	8,048	1.0
Sam Lucas	7,858	1.0
Total votes	801,490	100.0

2000 San Francisco Board of Supervisors 8th district election
Candidate	Votes	%
Mark Leno (incumbent)	17,050	49.9
Eileen Hansen	11,531	33.7
James Green	2,062	6.0
Gary Virginia	1,331	3.9
Scott Bingham	1,205	3.5
Shawn O'Hearn	932	2.7
Write-in	67	0.2
Total votes	34,178	100.0
Runoff election
Mark Leno (incumbent)	9,578	51.9
Eileen Hansen	8,866	48.1
Total votes	18,444	100.0

=== California State Assembly ===
2002 California State Assembly 13th district election
Primary election
Party	Candidate	Votes	%
Democratic	Mark Leno	22,017	43.0
Democratic	Harry Britt	20,088	39.2
Democratic	Steve Phillips	6,081	11.8
Democratic	Holli Thier	3,076	6.0
Total votes		51,262	100.0
General election
Democratic	Mark Leno	89,921	81.5
Republican	Gail E. Neira	15,278	13.9
Libertarian	Christopher R. Maden	5,134	4.6
Total votes		110,333	100.0

2004 California State Assembly 13th district election
Primary election
Party	Candidate	Votes	%
Democratic	Mark Leno (incumbent)	65,796	100.0
Total votes		65,796	100.0
General election
Democratic	Mark Leno (incumbent)	148,863	82.0
Republican	Gail E. Neira	23,900	13.1
Libertarian	Jonathan Scott Marvin	8,980	4.9
Total votes		181,743	100.0

2006 California State Assembly 13th district election
Primary election
Party	Candidate	Votes	%
Democratic	Mark Leno (incumbent)	45,059	100.0
Total votes		45,059	100.0
General election
Democratic	Mark Leno (incumbent)	110,937	86.9
Republican	Ramiro Maldonado, Jr.	16,760	13.1
Total votes		127,697	100.0

=== California State Senate ===
2008 California State Senate 3rd district election
Primary election
Party	Candidate	Votes	%
Democratic	Mark Leno	58,727	43.8
Democratic	Carole Migden (incumbent)	38,234	28.6
Democratic	Joe Nation	37,136	27.6
Total votes		134,097	100.0
General election
Democratic	Mark Leno	326,755	80.2
Republican	Sashi McEntee	80,617	19.8
Total votes		407,372	100.0

2012 California State Senate 11th district election
Primary election
Party	Candidate	Votes	%
Democratic	Mark Leno (incumbent)	118,023	82.0
Republican	Harmeet K. Dhillon	25,828	18.0
Total votes		143,851	100.0
General election
Democratic	Mark Leno (incumbent)	303,241	84.7
Republican	Harmeet K. Dhillon	54,887	15.3
Total votes		358,128	100.0

Political offices
Preceded by Susan Leal	Member of the San Francisco Board of Supervisors; District 8; 1998–2002	Succeeded by Bevan Dufty
California Assembly
Preceded by Carole Migden	Member of the California State Assembly; 13th district 2002–2008	Succeeded by Tom Ammiano
California Senate
Preceded by Carole Migden	Member of the California State Senate; 3rd district 2008–2012	Succeeded by Lois Wolk
Preceded by Joe Simitian	Member of the California State Senate; 11th district 2012–2016	Succeeded by Scott Wiener
