= Enola Maxwell =

American civil rights activist (1919–2003)

Enola D. "Miz" Maxwell (August 30, 1919 – June 24, 2003) was an American civil rights activist from San Francisco in the United States. She was a community leader, active in the Potrero Hill neighborhood.

== Biography ==
In 1968, Maxwell became the first woman – and first black person – to be named as lay minister at a Presbyterian Church, she served at Olivet Presbyterian Church in the Potrero Hill neighborhood.

Maxwell was later appointed by the church as the executive director of the Potrero Hill Neighborhood House from 1971 until 2003, a role she served until her death at the age of 83. The Potrero Hill Neighborhood House serves the local community with adult education classes, youth and summer school classes, a kindergarten, a meeting hall, and offers theatre performances and dramatics classes.

In 2001, the Potrero Hill Middle School was renamed to the Enola D. Maxwell Middle School of the Arts. The Enola D. Maxwell Middle School of the Arts is located at the same site as a 1950s public housing site that Maxwell had lived in. Her daughter, Sophie Maxwell, was elected to the San Francisco Board of Supervisors in 2000.

== See also ==
- African Americans in San Francisco
