= California Proposition 22 =

California Proposition 22 may refer to:

- 2000 California Proposition 22, a law enacted by California voters in March 2000
- California Proposition 22 (2010), 2010 citizen-initiated constitutional amendment proposition
- 2020 California Proposition 22, a California ballot proposition for the general election on November 3, 2020
