= Potrero Hill Neighborhood House =

Historic community building in San Francisco, California, U.S.

Potrero Hill Neighborhood House "The NABE"
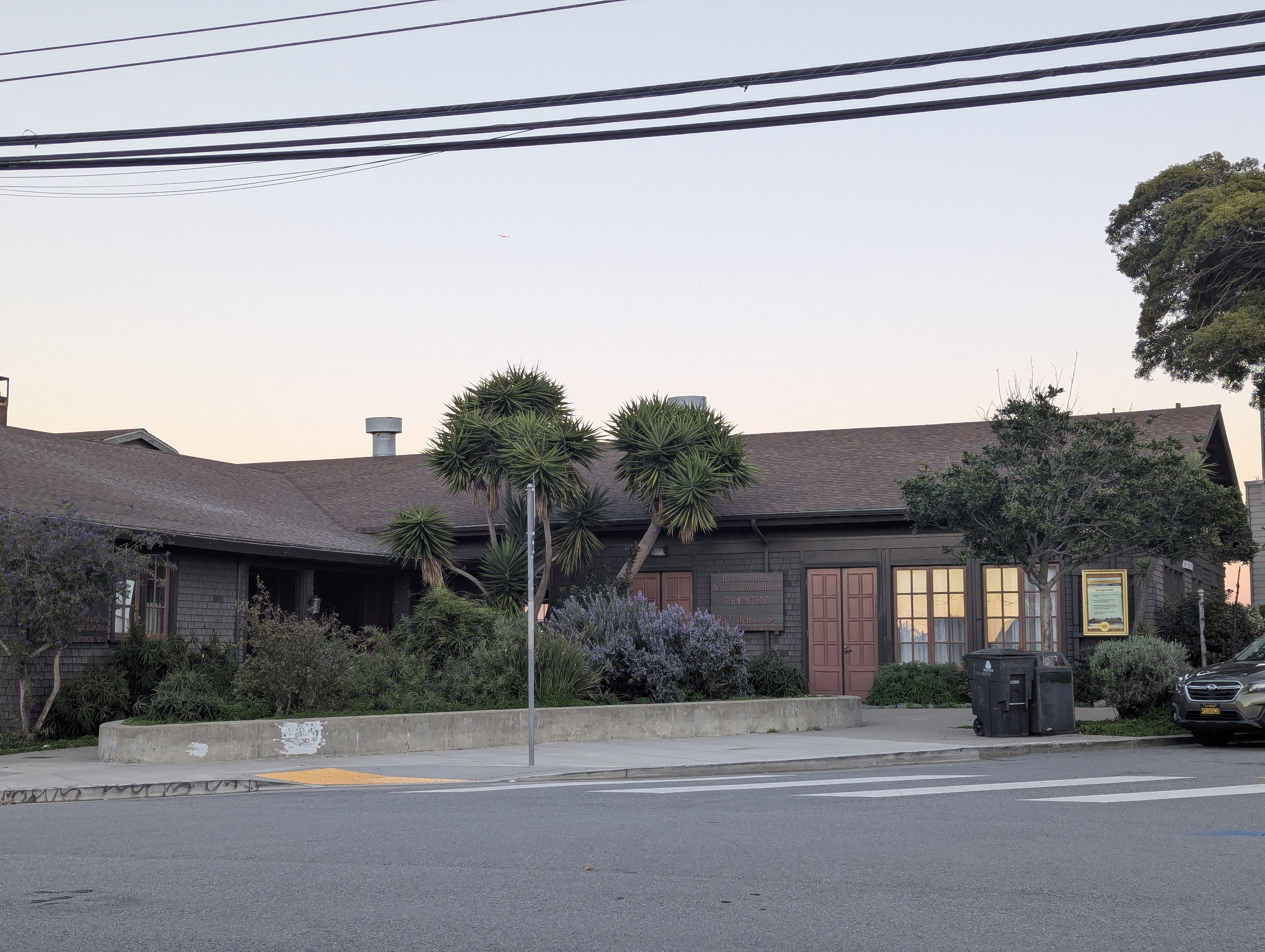

- Location within San Francisco County Location within California
- 37.758330°N 122.400726°W
- Location: 953 DeHaro Street, San Francisco, California, U.S.

History
- Opened: June 11, 1922

Site notes
- Architect: Julia Morgan

San Francisco Designated Landmark
- Designated: July 9, 1977
- Reference no.: 86

The Potrero Hill Neighborhood House (also known as "The NABE") is a multipurpose community center and historic building built in 1922 at 953 DeHaro Street in the Potrero Hill neighborhood of San Francisco, California, U.S.. The Potrero Hill Neighborhood House has been listed as a San Francisco Designated Landmark since July 9, 1977.

== Architecture ==
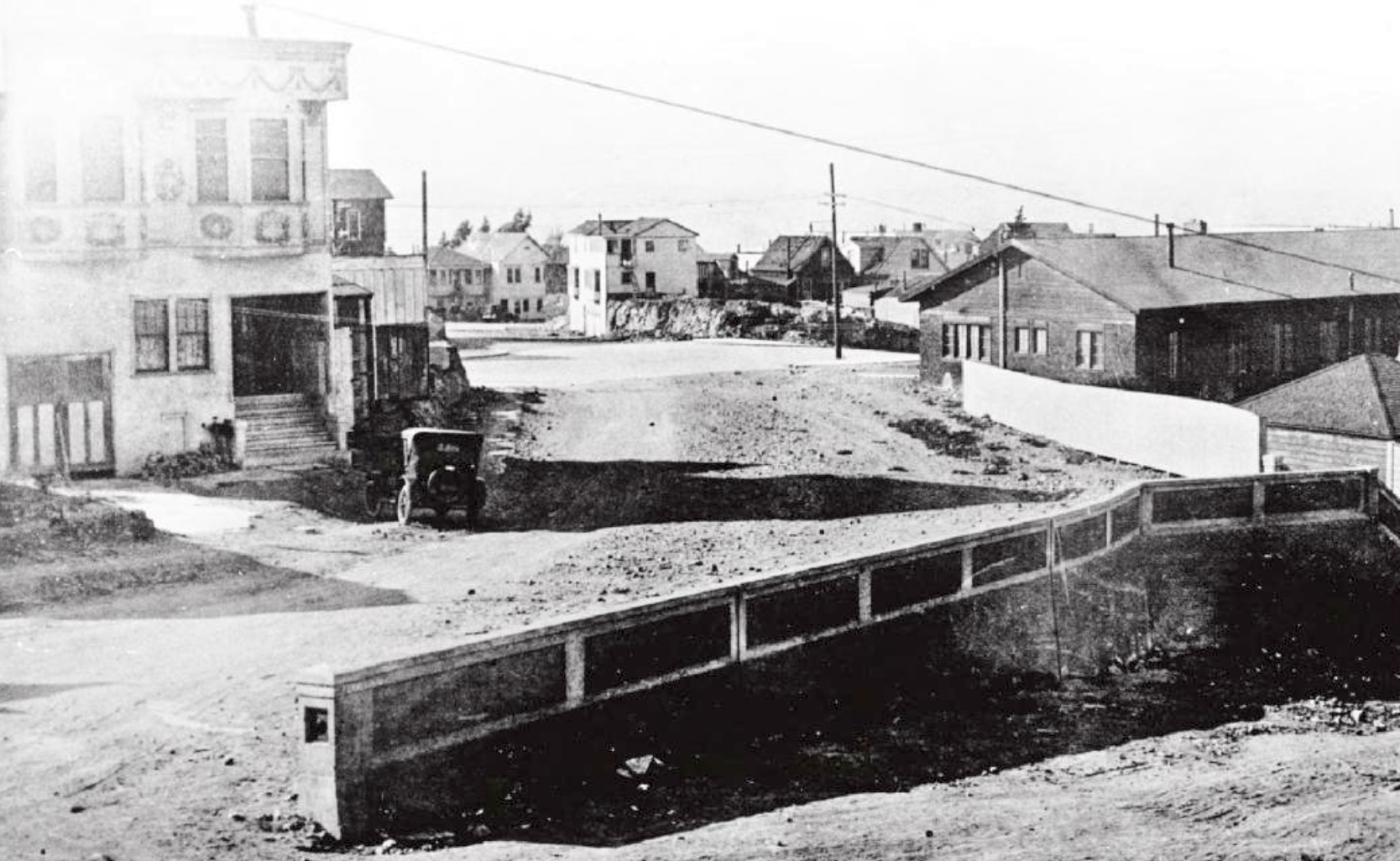
Potrero Hill Neighborhood House, after moving in 1924

Potrero Hill Neighborhood House building was designed by architect Julia Morgan, and was completed on June 11, 1922. It is a single story Arts and Crafts–style building. The Potrero Hill Neighborhood House design contained a large lobby with a fireplace, an assembly hall, clubrooms, a kindergarten, and a gymnasium room.

In 1924, the Potrero Hill Neighborhood House structure was moved 90 feet in order to make way for the construction of a new street called Southern Heights Avenue. In 1930, a new Julia Morgan-designed building on Carolina Street was created to accommodate the kindergarten.

== History ==
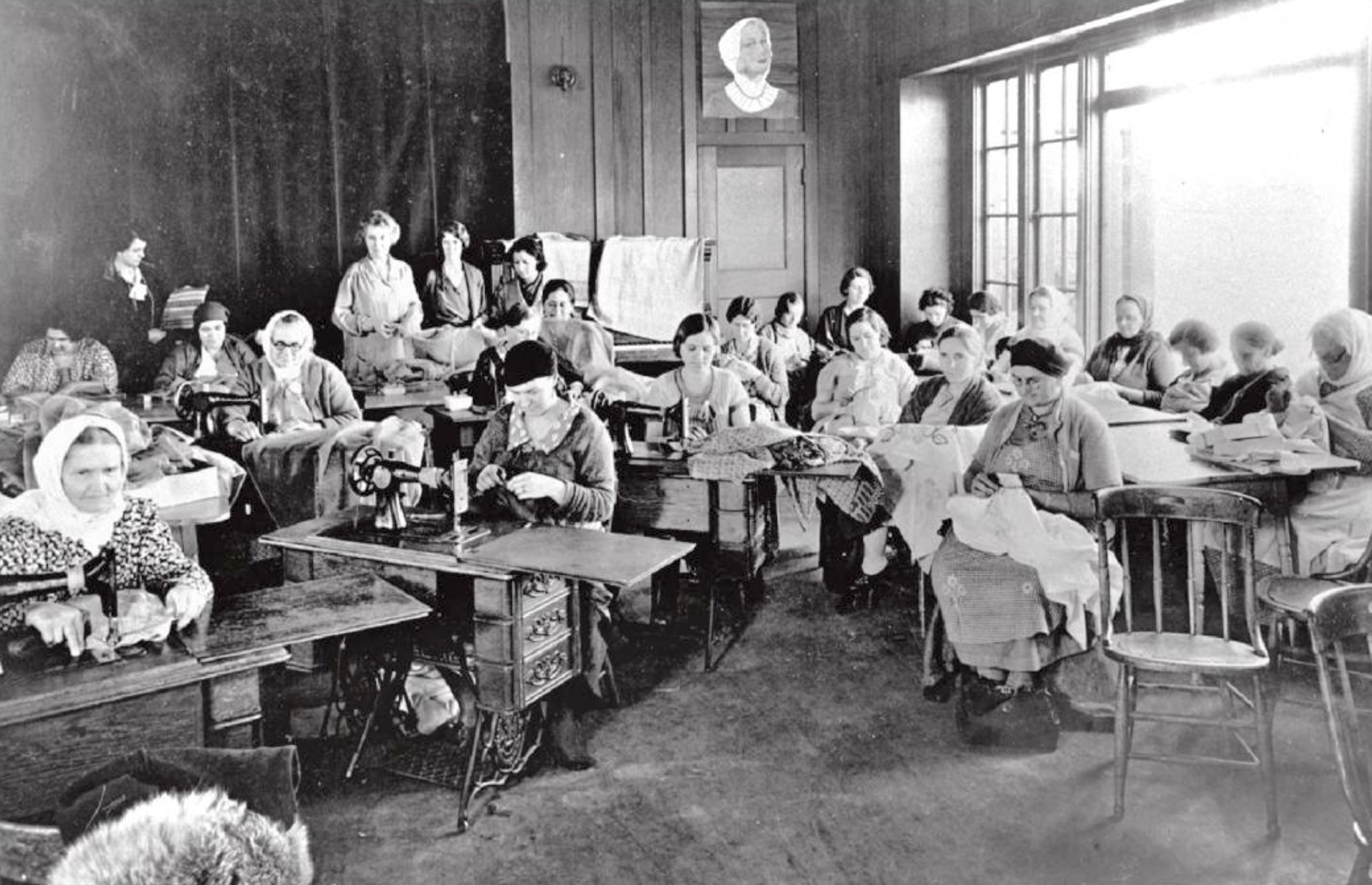
Potrero Hill Neighborhood House, an adult class

During the 1920s a number of immigrants from a Russia religious sect, the Molokans, had settled in Potrero Hill after they fled Czarist persecution in the Volga and Caucasus regions. Rev. William E. Parker, Jr., a pastor of the Olivet Presbyterian Church (located at Missouri and 19th Streets), was concerned about the needs of the community and brought the issue to the San Francisco Presbytery leaders. In 1919, the California Synodical Society of Home Mission, Inc., a group of women affiliated with the Presbyterian Church made Potrero Hill their first unit of Christian social service by offering adult education courses to the new immigrants. The Molokans were able to learned English, sewing machine skills, and other skills at the Potrero Hill Neighborhood House.

During the Great Depression, the adult education classes at the Potrero Hill Neighborhood House were funded by New Deal programs.

In the 1940s and 1950s, a school was run out of the building by the Golden Gate Kindergarten Association. During World War II, the Potrero Hill Mother's Club, a group of women which met at the Potrero Hill Neighborhood House, sold Russian food items in order to fundraise for the American war efforts.

Enola D. Maxwell, a lay minister at Olivet Presbyterian Church, later served as the director of the Potrero Hill Neighborhood House from 1971 until 2003.

== Modern history ==
Today the Potrero Hill Neighborhood House offers community interest–driven adult education, as well as theatre performances and dramatics classes, hosts youth organizations, summer camp sessions, counseling, and more.
