= Bevan Dufty =

American politician (born 1955)

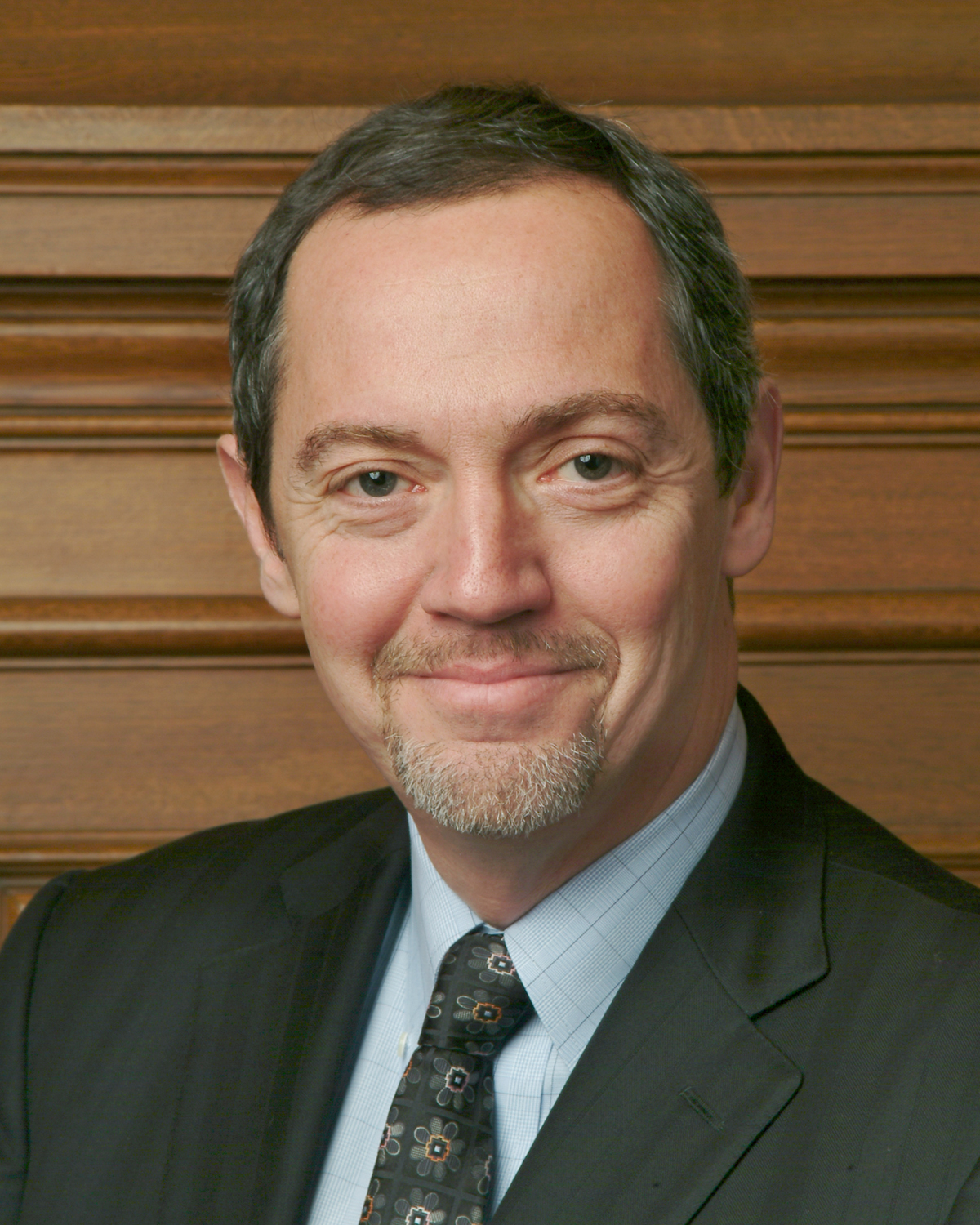
- Official portrait, 2009

Member of the San Francisco Board of Supervisors from District 8
- In office December 11, 2002 – January 8, 2011
- Preceded by: Mark Leno
- Succeeded by: Scott Wiener

Personal details
- Born: February 27, 1955 (age 71)
- Party: Democratic
- Children: 1
- Parent(s): William Dufty; Maely Bartholomew
- Education: University of California, Berkeley
- Occupation: Politician
- Profession: Government of San Francisco
- Website: Supervisor Bevan Dufty

Bevan Dufty (born February 27, 1955) is an American politician and Director of HOPE (Housing Opportunity, Partnerships and Engagement) for the City and County of San Francisco. In 2012, Dufty was elected to serve as a Member of the San Francisco Democratic County Central Committee. Previously, he was a Member of the San Francisco Board of Supervisors, and was elected in 2002 to represent the City's 8th District, succeeding Mark Leno. Dufty was re-elected as Supervisor in 2006 and was termed out in 2011.

== Early life ==
Dufty is the son of the writer William Dufty and Maely Bartholomew, who had lost most of her family in the Holocaust. Dufty was raised in Harlem, New York City where his mother befriended jazz musician Billie Holiday, who would later become his godmother. His voice can be heard on a recording made in the Dufty household where Holiday makes jokes about his red underpants.

After moving from Harlem to California at age 16, Dufty finished high school at Menlo-Atherton High School, south of San Francisco. Dufty graduated from the University of California, Berkeley, where he was a student body co-president and earned a degree in Political Science.

== Political career ==
Dufty served as Senior Legislative Assistant for Education in the office of New York Rep. Shirley Chisholm. Later, he served as Chief Legislative Aide to Rep. Julian Dixon, a post in which he helped craft legislation that created the Los Angeles Metro Rail system. In San Francisco, he worked for former Supervisor Susan Leal, served as a senior advisor for Mayor Willie Brown and as Director of Neighborhood Services.

A Democrat, Dufty was elected a supervisor from the city's eighth district in 2002 before being re-elected in 2006. He served as Chair of the San Francisco County Transportation Authority, Chair of the City Operations & Neighborhood Services Committee as well as a Representative on the Golden Gate Bridge, Highway and Transportation District Board.

== Personal life ==
Dufty is openly gay. His election campaigns have often won the backing of the Gay and Lesbian Victory Fund.

In 2006, Dufty and lesbian friend Rebecca Goldfader (an Ob/Gyn nurse practitioner and Pilates instructor) had a child, Sidney.

Political offices
Preceded by Mark Leno	Member of the San Francisco Board of Supervisors; District 8; 2002–2011	Succeeded by Scott Wiener
