= Chris Daly =

American politician (born 1972)

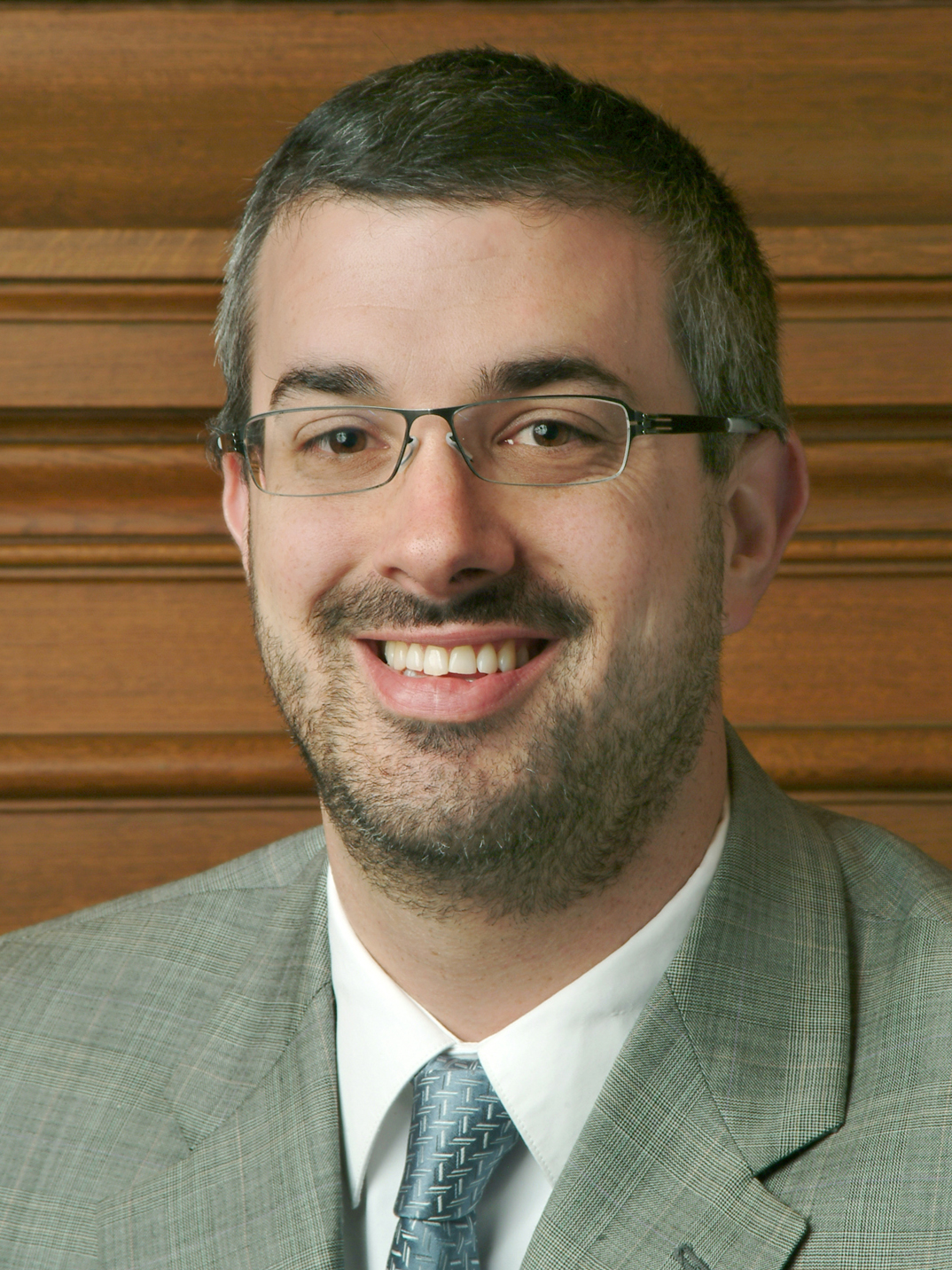
- Official portrait, 2010

Member of the San Francisco Board of Supervisors from District 6
- In office January 8, 2001 – January 8, 2011
- Preceded by: Constituency established
- Succeeded by: Jane Kim

Personal details
- Born: Christopher Edward Daly; August 13, 1972 (age 53) Silver Spring, Maryland
- Party: Democratic
- Spouse: Sarah Low Daly
- Children: Jack, Grace
- Website: Supervisor Chris Daly

Christopher Edward Daly (born August 13, 1972) is a former San Francisco Board of Supervisors member He represented District 6, serving from 2001 to 2011. He now lives in Fairfield, California, but commutes to Las Vegas, Nevada and Carson City, Nevada, where he works for the Nevada State Education Association.

== Background ==
Daly grew up in Gaithersburg, Maryland and went to Laytonsville Elementary School and Gaithersburg Middle and High Schools; his father was a federal employee and consultant, and his mother was an accountant. Daly was valedictorian of his high school class and was drawn to service as a teenager through the 4-H club. He attended Duke University, where he and other activists convinced the school to spend $3 million on affordable housing. He did not graduate. He moved to San Francisco in 1993, where he became involved in local politics through an advocacy group for homeless people called Mission Agenda.

Daly is married to Sarah Low Daly, whom he met at the World Youth Festival in Havana, Cuba; they have two children.

== Political career ==
Daly was first elected to office in 2000 in a near sweep for progressive candidates in supervisorial races. He ran on his credentials as a housing advocate in the Mission District. Daly was re-elected in 2002 and 2006. Daly received 8,472, 6,642, and 8,968 votes respectively in the three contested elections.

=== Housing and homelessness ===
Daly's legislative record focused primarily on housing and homelessness. He sponsored legislation to help low-income tenants of Single-room occupancy (SRO) residential hotels, many of whom were located in his district. In 2005, Daly negotiated a planned development on Rincon Hill, where the property was rezoned to allow for high-rise development in exchange for a higher percentage of affordable housing units and "community benefits" to non-profits in the area. Daly also received unanimous support for a plan to demolish and rebuild an apartment complex at Trinity Plaza in exchange for 590 affordable units. This was the first time in California history that a housing developer voluntarily allowed new construction to be covered by rent control.

Critics of Daly's housing policies point to his attempt to ban tenancy-in-common apartment conversions, which they believe allow middle-income people to buy property in San Francisco.

In June 2006, Daly sponsored the Eviction Disclosure Ordinance, which required real estate agents to inform buyers whether a tenant was evicted from a property they wished to purchase. The ballot proposition won with 52 percent of the vote.

In March 2007, Daly, chairman of the Budget and Finance Committee, introduced a proposal that would appropriate $28 million for affordable housing. In April 2007, Daly introduced another proposal that would appropriate an additional $15 million in services for seniors and families. Eight members of the Board of Supervisors passed the affordable housing measure, but Mayor Gavin Newsom refused to spend the money.

=== Progressive convention ===
In June 2007, Daly organized a "Progressive Convention" to find a candidate to run against popular Mayor Gavin Newsom. Daly stated that if the convention could not choose a candidate, he himself would run. But when the Progressive Convention did not nominate anyone, Daly declined to run himself. He said that he wanted to spend time with his family and that his wife was due to give birth shortly before the mayoral election.

=== Elimination of Police Chief post ===
Daly suggested putting a charter amendment before voters in the November 2007 municipal election calling for elimination of the police chief post. Instead, the elected sheriff would oversee all law enforcement in the city and county of San Francisco. The suggestion arose from Daly's disagreements with Police Chief Heather Fong about the placement and use of police patrols. "If they keep the attacks on me, I'll keep moving forward what I think is good public policy," Daly said. "What they fear is the end of their reign of terror in San Francisco."

=== Opposition to the Blue Angels ===
In June 2007, Daly announced that he was working with anti-war activist organizations such as Code Pink, Global Exchange and Veterans for Peace and considering introducing a proposal to ban the Blue Angels from flying during San Francisco's Fleet Week. Following significant negative public response and media inquiries, Daly announced that he had decided against making this proposal, blaming reporters at the San Francisco Examiner for his inability to move forward with this controversial proposal.

=== Removal from Budget Committee chairmanship ===
On June 15, 2007, Board President Aaron Peskin removed Daly as chairman of the Budget and Finance Committee shortly before it was to finalize the $6.06 billion budget proposed by Mayor Gavin Newsom. Explaining why he removed Daly, Peskin cited Daly's bitter public conflict with the mayor over budget priorities. "Fundamentally," he said, "the budget process is about public policy and not about personality and it is important that we stay committed to having an outcome that ensures we have a budget that reflects the values of the people of San Francisco."

=== Canceling of the San Francisco Grand Prix ===
Daly, along with Aaron Peskin, was instrumental in the canceling of the San Francisco Grand Prix, a world-class bicycle race held from 2001 to 2005, because of disagreements over the amount to be paid for traffic and crowd control and because the race's backers owed the city $89,924. In 2001 Mayor Willie Brown, who supported the race, allowed its organizers to incur a $350,000 debt and later ordered city officials to forgive that debt. Critics alleged that the race was canceled for political reasons including pressure from Peskin's constituents over parking issues. In Daly's personal blog, he referred to one of the chief backers of the race, San Francisco banker Thom Weisel, as a "multi-millionaire Republican politico". The race, which was organized as a 1.HC event and in 2005 was part of the UCI America Tour attracted hundreds of thousands of spectators as well as world-class athletes such as seven-time Tour de France winner Lance Armstrong, and was regarded as one of the country's most challenging, particularly for its famously difficult 18% grade Fillmore and Taylor street climbs. Mayor Gavin Newsom, who also supported the race, said it provided cultural, social, and economic benefit to San Francisco. A 2005 study commissioned by the San Francisco Convention & Visitors Bureau found the Labor Day weekend race generated $10.2 million for city businesses that year.

=== Olympic torch resolution ===
On March 20, 2008, Daly introduced a resolution which criticized the human rights record of China and urged officials representing San Francisco during the upcoming Olympic torch ceremonies (scheduled for April 9, 2008) to "make publicly known that the 2008 Summer Games torch is received with alarm and protest." Daly's resolution was covered extensively by the local media and elevated the issues of treatment of protests in relation to the Olympics being held in China, the 2008 Summer Olympics torch relay and the torch ceremonies being held in San Francisco, the only North American stop. The torch relay will be the first time in Olympics history that protests will accompany the torch as it passes through a U.S. city. Daly stated, "[T]he magnitude of attention paid to the Olympic Games and the torch relay makes the event the appropriate platform to discuss human rights. If someone can look you in the face and tell you the Olympics are limited to the individual competitions that take place, well, that's a good poker player." Daly also criticized the rare decision to set up designated "free-speech zones" stating, "I don't see why we should break from our pattern of how we handle mass protests or demonstrations for China." San Francisco mayor, Gavin Newsom, said he has "very serious concerns" about the situation in Tibet but added San Francisco is "privileged" to be the torch's only stop in North America and that the event should rise above political concerns and that the Games should be a time "to focus on the things that unite us and not divide us." In a later committee meeting supervisors Carmen Chu and Sean Elsbernd amended the resolution to welcome the Global Human Rights Torch Relay on April 5 and the Tibetan Freedom Torch on April 8 and commend "their efforts to raise awareness regarding human rights violations in China and urging the San Francisco City Representatives ... to welcome the Torch in the explicit spirit of Olympism, consistent with the United Nations Charter ... and the United Nations Universal Declaration of Human Rights."

=== Appointments to Public Utilities Commission ===
On October 22, 2003, during his one-day shift as Acting Mayor, while Mayor Willie Brown traveled to Tibet, Daly appointed two members to the San Francisco Public Utilities Commission without Brown's consent, having consulted with the City Attorney who had advised him that as acting mayor he had the legal authority to make appointments in Mayor Brown's absence. Brown, who had his own people in mind for the assignments, had a different opinion, stating that "[The appointments] were made by a person who was supposed to be operating in a ceremonial capacity... [It was] a conspiracy to... move away from the traditions, the rules, the customs and the conduct that has been the hallmark of this city, long before I became mayor of this city." Brown also compared Daly to a stalker and suicide bomber, stating that, "When you conspire and calculate what you intend to do several days before you're designated as the acting mayor, you really are venal, you really are violative of all the protocols. It's like stalking. You knew exactly what you were intending to do. You concealed all your steps. You carefully plotted, then you did it behind closed doors, and then you laughed about it." Brown said he found out about Daly's actions when his chief of staff called him in Tibet. Brown was sleeping at the time but with the assistance of Chinese officials, was on a plane home within hours, cutting short his trade and promotion trip to China—reportedly explaining the matter to his hosts simply as a "coup."

Nonetheless, the City Attorney stood behind its legal opinion and environmentalist and former Sierra Club president Adam Werbach was later sworn in. The second appointee, architect Robin Chiang, was rescinded because Brown had already made one appointment, Andrew Lee, son of one of Brown's fund-raiser Julie Lee, who was convicted of mail fraud and witness tampering on July 12, 2008. Daly and his allies on the board said Andrew Lee represented political patronage at its worst. According to John Rizzo, vice chairman of the Bay chapter of the Sierra Club, Daly's appointments would add "expertise to the SFPUC that was greatly lacking and is a great improvement" Brown said that Daly's action went beyond betrayal and that he considers his relationship with Daly, who he had praised in recent months, over. The custom of assigning the acting mayor position to supervisors on a round-robin basis was discontinued as a result of Daly's appointments. Daly said by way of explanation for his actions, "I'm an activist. I had an opportunity, and I took it. I stand by what I did. It was the right thing."

=== Controversies ===
Daly has a reputation for having a fiery demeanor. According to the San Francisco Chronicle, Daly is "either a hothead or a passionate advocate—depending on whose side you are on."

In 2001, Daly nearly came to blows with Mayor Willie Brown after Daly brought homeless activists to a meeting that was supposed to be "private." Asked to apologize, Daly replied, "I will apologize that I was lured into the mayor's finger-pointing politics." In November 2004, fellow supervisor Michela Alioto-Pier lodged a petition for censure against Daly after he told a landlord advocate to "fuck off" at a tenants' rights hearing (the petition failed by a vote of 8–2).

In 2001, Daly famously told his colleagues at a Supervisors' meeting, "I'm not feeling the love," when they rejected his proposals for balancing the budget, as he stormed out of the room. In 2002, Daly was arrested after a confrontation with police over a land use dispute concerning Hastings Law School, and reportedly told the arresting officer that he would have him fired; no charges were filed.

In June 2007, after learning that an attempted budget maneuver would be unsuccessful, Daly, according to San Francisco Chronicle columnists Phillip Matier and Andrew Ross, "went ballistic — singling out fellow progressive leader Ross Mirkarimi for a tongue lashing so heated that fellow supervisors joked about calling in the SWAT team to cool things down".

On June 19, 2007, during a Board of Supervisors meeting, Daly suggested that Mayor Gavin Newsom uses cocaine and is a hypocrite for proposing public health cuts for substance abuse treatment for the poor. Daly stated that it was ironic of Newsom to propose cuts to a drug treatment program, "while the mayor of San Francisco artfully dodges every question about allegations of his own cocaine use." The mayor's press secretary said Daly's remarks were "sleazy politics of personal destruction." The Board of Supervisors President stated that "Supervisor Daly's comments were conduct unbecoming and do not represent the position of the Board of Supervisors or its president." The editorial board of the San Francisco Chronicle recommended censuring Daly.

During an August 7, 2008, Rules Committee hearing after Daly had presented his resolution to turn the San Francisco Zoo into a rescue facility and when he was out of the room, a student from Lowell High School who had waited two hours for her chance to speak in support of the zoo, began to cry at the podium, because she, like the other speakers, was only allowed one minute to speak. Normally at Board of Supervisors hearings, speakers have 2–3 minutes to speak, but time is limited by the discretion of the chair often to shorter periods of time, especially if there are a large number of speakers. This was the second time the item had been heard in committee, and Chris Daly chose to limit public comment to one minute, so that another item regarding black flight from the city could be heard at that same hearing. Carl Friedman, the Director of the San Francisco Department of Animal Care and Control, said, "There were a lot of young people there who have never been to a government meeting. For this to be their first experience was embarrassing." When asked about the situation, the student responded, "I didn't mean to cry, I just kind of lost it. I thought they were supposed to listen to us."

On April 21, 2009, at a Democratic Party fundraising lunch, members of the Building and Construction Trades Council called on Party Chairman Aaron Peskin and Daly to resign over their support for the voter-approved Historic Preservation Commission.

In 2009, questions began to arise whether Chris Daly actually lived in San Francisco. He purchased a home in Fairfield, California, and sent his family to live there. San Francisco law requires supervisors to live in the district which they represent. . On January 8, 2010, Daly announced to the Board of Supervisors' Rules Committee, "I vow to use the word fuck in each of my remaining Board of Supervisors meetings."

On July 27, 2010, Daly called for at least 50 percent of proposed new Hunters Point housing be affordable. He stated that although it would be impossible for Lennar (the project's Miami-based developer) to meet this expanded affordability requirement, that nevertheless shouldn't be a concern. If the project becomes too expensive for local residents to move in, "there's going to be a pretty new neighborhood, with lots of white folks living in the Bayview," Daly said. Michael Cohen, head of the mayor's Office of Economic and Workforce Development, stated that Daly's amendment was a deal-killer, because "the project is not financially viable at 50 percent affordable."

Susan King, a past spokesperson for San Francisco's Green Party, said about Daly, "At the end of the day, I totally appreciate the fact that he is out there in the trenches. It's not 100 percent that I agree with him, but you know where his heart is and where his values are." Nathan Nayman, executive director of the Committee on Jobs (a pro-business PAC that receives contributions from corporate donors and promotes economic development), said "Chris Daly has given the Board of Supervisors a black eye that refuses to heal. He's maniacal and he's been given to outbursts on a regular basis." The San Francisco Bay Guardian says that "Daly's a hard worker, has a solid record...is popular in his district...is more than a good supervisor.... He's part of the class of 2000, one of a crew of activists who swept into power in the first district elections as a rebellion against the developer-driven politics of then-mayor Willie Brown." The Berkeley Planet said "Chris Daly [has] a strong progressive record in [his] legislative bod[y]... first elected because [he] engaged [his] district's most disenfranchised population."

== Post-electoral career ==
After leaving the San Francisco Board of Supervisors, Daly moved to Fairfield, California. He purchased Buck Tavern, a bar on Market Street in San Francisco. He operated the bar until October 2012, when the lease expired and he chose not to renew. In February 2012, Daly took a job with Local 1021 of the Service Employees International Union in San Francisco. He left that job in September 2014. In 2016, he started working for the Nevada State Education Association, the state teacher union based in Las Vegas.

Political offices
Preceded by Election not district-specific	Member of the San Francisco Board of Supervisors; District 6; 2001–2011	Succeeded by Jane Kim
