= 2026 California State Board of Equalization election =

2026 California State Board of Equalization elections
- November 3, 2026

All 4 seats on the California State Board of Equalization
	Majority party	Minority party
Party	Democratic	Republican
Last election	3	1
Seats before	3	1
Seats won	4	0
Seat change	1 ▲	1 ▼

District map effective from January 1, 2023

The 2026 California State Board of Equalization elections took place on November 3, 2026, to elect all four seats of the State Board of Equalization, with the non-partisan blanket primary election took place on June 2, 2026.

== Overview ==
District	Incumbent	Party	Elected	Party
1st	Ted Gaines (term-limited)	Republican	Nelson Esparza	Democratic
2nd	Sally Lieber	Democratic	Sally Lieber	Democratic
3rd	Tony Vazquez (term-limited)	Democratic	Mike Gipson	Democratic
4th	Mike Schaefer (term-limited)	Democratic	Tom Umberg	Democratic

== District 1 ==
2026 California's 1st State Board of Equalization district election
- November 3, 2026
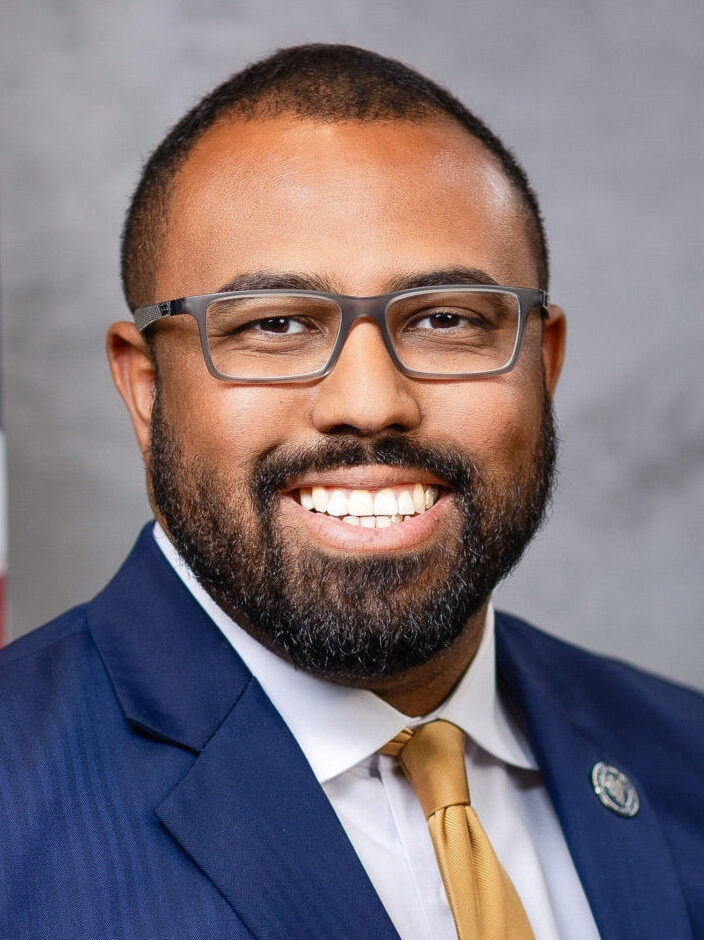

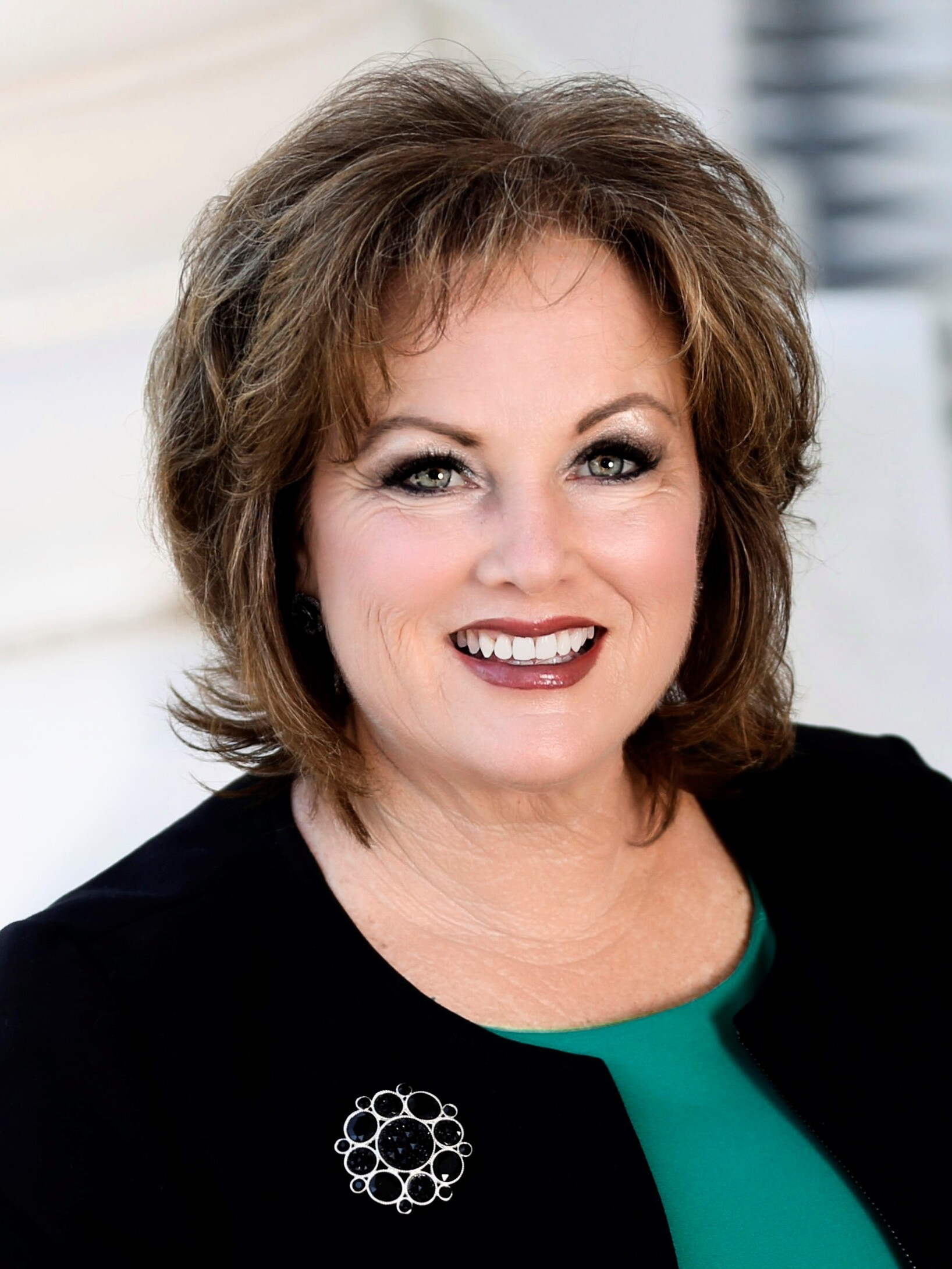
Nominee	Nelson Esparza	Shannon Grove
Party	Democratic	Republican
Popular vote	1,625,261	1,311,571
Percentage	55.3%	44.7%
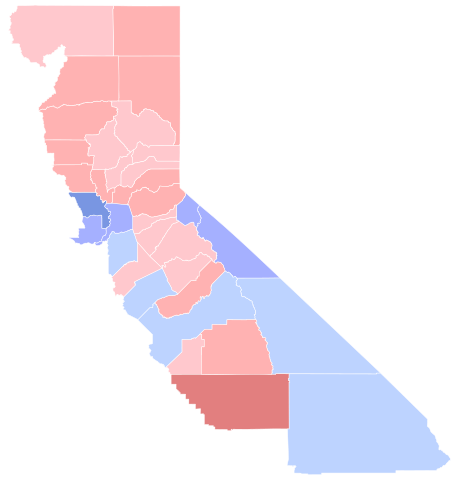
- Grove: 30–40% 40–50% 50–60% Esparza: 30–40% 40–50% 50–60%
Board of Equalization member before election
Ted Gaines
Republican
Elected Board of Equalization member
Nelson Esparza
Democratic

The incumbent is Republican Ted Gaines, who was re-elected in 2022 with 55.5% of the vote. He is term-limited and ineligible to run for re-election, instead running for the El Dorado County Board of Supervisors. District 1 encompasses much of inland California, stretching from Modoc County and Sisiyou County on the Oregon border to Southern California to include San Bernardino County (excluding the cities of Chino, Chino Hills, Ontario, Rancho Cucamonga, and Upland).

=== Candidates ===
==== Advanced to general ====
- Nelson Esparza (Democratic), Fresno city councilmember
- Shannon Grove (Republican), state senator from the 12th district

==== Eliminated in primary ====
- Dusty Beach (Republican), retired correctional officer
- Nader F. Shahatit (Republican), tax consultant
- Donald E. Williamson (Democratic), former San Bernardino County Assessor (1994–2006)

=== Endorsements ===
Shannon Grove (R)

US Representatives

- Doug LaMalfa, CA-01 (2013–2026) (deceased)

State officials

- Ted Gaines, incumbent Board of Equalization member

Newspapers

- The Fresno Bee
- The Sacramento Bee

Organizations

- Howard Jarvis Taxpayers Association

Political party organizations

- Republican Party of Sacramento County
Nelson Esparza (D)

US Representatives

- Jim Costa, CA-20 (2005–2013), CA-16 (2013–2023), CA-21 (2023–present)
- Adam Gray, CA-13 (2025–present)

State legislators

- Esmeralda Soria, state assemblymember from the 27th district (2022–present)

Labor unions

- California Labor Federation

Political parties

- California Democratic Party
- Democratic Party of Sacramento County

Organizations

- California Young Democrats

=== Results ===
2026 California's 1st Board of Equalization district election
Primary election
Party	Candidate	Votes	%
Republican	Shannon Grove	672,039	34.46
Democratic	Nelson Esparza	664,072	34.05
Democratic	Donald Williamson	289,781	14.86
Republican	Dusty Beach	238,861	12.25
Republican	Nader Shahatit	85,636	4.39
Total votes		1,950,389	100.00
General election
Democratic	Nelson Esparza	1,625,261	55.3%
Republican	Shannon Grove	1,311,571	44.7%
Democratic gain from Republican			
Total votes			100.00

== District 2 ==
2026 California's 2nd State Board of Equalization district election
- November 3, 2026
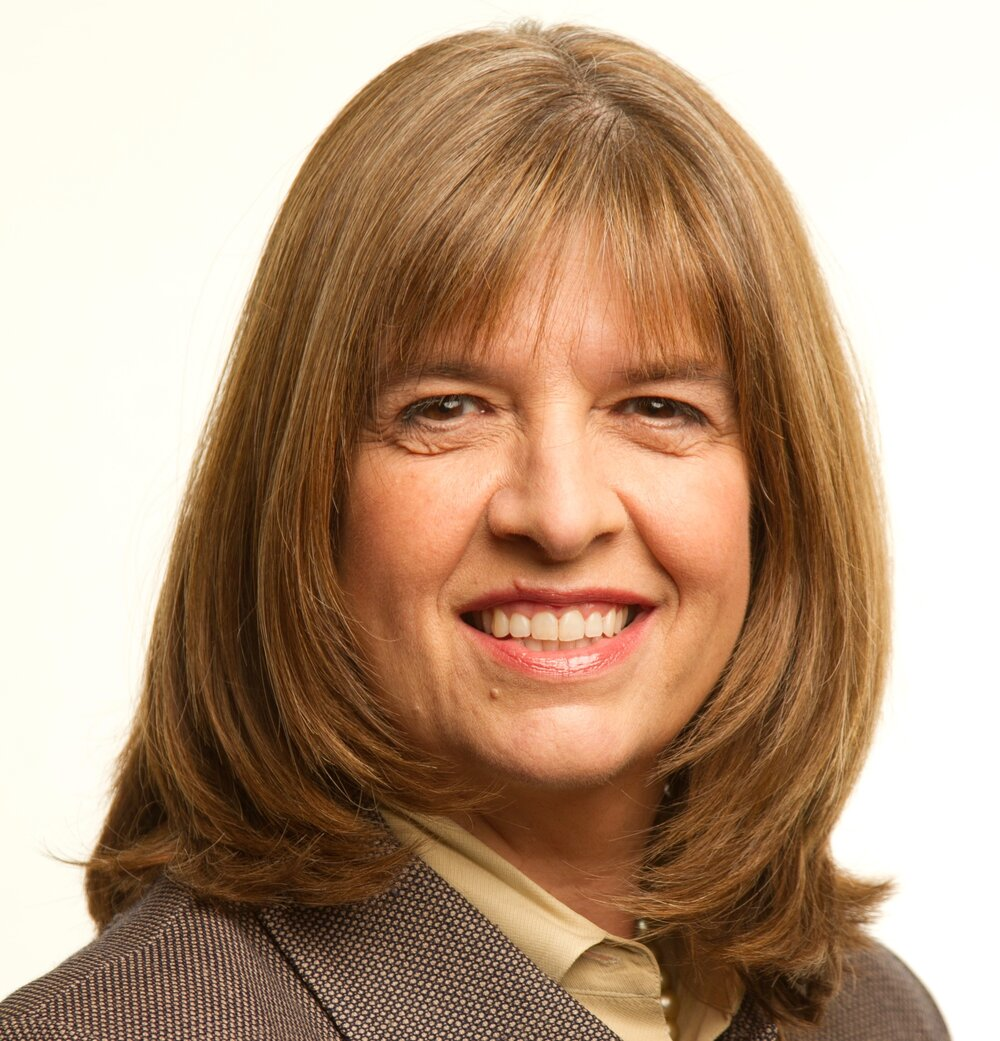

Nominee	Sally Lieber	John Pimentel
Party	Democratic	Democratic
Popular vote	1,782,314	1,210,090
Percentage	59.6%	40.4%
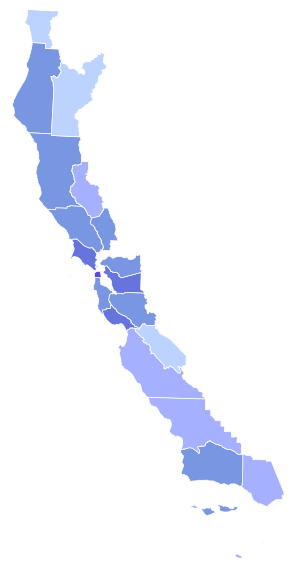
- Lieber: 30–40% 40–50% 50–60% 60–70% 70–80%
Board of Equalization member before election
Sally Lieber
Democratic
Elected Board of Equalization member
Sally Lieber
Democratic

The incumbent is Democrat Sally Lieber, who was elected in 2022 with 69.8% of the vote and is eligible to run for a second term. District 2 encompasses a majority of coastal California, stretching from Del Norte County on the Oregon border to Ventura County, near Los Angeles County.

=== Candidates ===
==== Advanced to general ====
- Sally Lieber (Democratic), incumbent member of the Board of Equalization
- John Pimentel (Democratic), trustee for the San Mateo County Community College District

==== Eliminated in primary ====
- J. Brett Marymee (Republican), small business owner
- Mark McComas (Republican)
- Bill Shireman (Republican), founder of Future500
- John Zaruka (Republican)

=== Endorsements ===
Sally Lieber (D)

Labor unions

- AFL-CIO South Bay Labor Council
- California Federation of Teachers
- California Labor Federation
- California Nurses Association
- California School Employees Association
- California Teachers Association
- CWA District 9
- IBEW Local 332
- IFPTE Local 21
- National Union of Healthcare Workers
- SEIU California and Local 521
- SEIU-UHW
- United Food and Commercial Workers Western States Council

Organizations

- Alice B. Toklas LGBTQ Democratic Club
- California Young Democrats
- East Bay Stonewall Democratic Club
- Equality California
- GrowSF
- Harvey Milk LGBTQ Democratic Club
- Planned Parenthood Affiliates of California
- Sierra Club Redwood

Political parties

- California Democratic Party
- California Working Families Party
- San Francisco Democratic Party

Newspapers

- San Francisco Bay Guardian
- The Tribune
J. Brett Marymee (R)

Organizations

- California Republican Assembly
- Howard Jarvis Taxpayers Association (co-endorsement with Pimentel)
- Reform California
John Pimentel (D)

Statewide officials

- Fiona Ma, treasurer of California (2019–present)

Local officials

- Matt Mahan, mayor of San Jose (2023–present)

Organizations

- Howard Jarvis Taxpayers Association (co-endorsement with Marymee)

Newspapers

- San Francisco Chronicle

=== Results ===
2026 California's 2nd Board of Equalization district election
Primary election
Party	Candidate	Votes	%
Democratic	Sally Lieber (incumbent)	1,336,379	56.76
Democratic	John Pimentel	371,920	15.80
Republican	Bill Shireman	259,336	11.01
Republican	J. Brett Marymee	208,311	8.85
Republican	Mark McComas	108,318	4.60
Republican	John Zaruka	70,379	2.99
Total votes		2,354,643	100.00
General election
Democratic	Sally Lieber (incumbent)	1,782,314	59.6%
Democratic	John Pimentel	1,210,090	40.7%
Total votes			100.00
Democratic hold			

== District 3 ==
2026 California's 3rd State Board of Equalization district election
- November 3, 2026
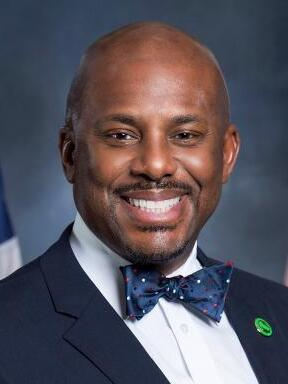

Nominee	Mike Gipson	Samuel Sukaton
Party	Democratic	Democratic
Popular vote	1,459,663	1,118,132
Percentage	56.6%	43.4%
- Gipson: 20–30% 30–40% Sukaton: 20–30%
Board of Equalization member before election
Tony Vazquez
Democratic
Elected Board of Equalization member
Mike Gipson
Democratic

The incumbent is Democrat Tony Vazquez, who was re-elected in 2022 with 70.4% of the vote. He is term-limited and ineligible to run for re-election, instead ran unsuccessfully for state treasurer. District 3 encompasses the entirety of Los Angeles County.

=== Candidates ===
==== Advanced to general ====
- Mike Gipson (Democratic), state assemblymember from the 65th district (2014-present)
- Samuel P. Sukaton (Democratic), labor organizer

==== Eliminated in primary ====
- Carlo Basail (Republican)
- Rudy Bermudez (Democratic), former state assemblyman (2002–2006)
- Stephan Hohil (Republican)
- Zhijing Liu (Democratic)
- Marie Manvel (No party preference)
- Rey Portela (Republican)
- Baru Alejandro Sanchez (Democratic)
- Yvonne Yiu (Democratic), former Monterey Park city councilmember (2020-2024), candidate for SD-25 in 2024, and candidate for state controller in 2022

==== Declined ====
- Ben Allen (Democratic), state senator from the 24th district (running for insurance commissioner)

=== Endorsements ===
Carlo Basail (R)

Organizations

- Reform California
Mike Gipson (D)

Statewide officials

- Malia Cohen, California State Controller (2023-present)
- Tony Vazquez, incumbent California State Board of Equalization member (2019-present)

State legislators

- Robert Rivas, Speaker of the California State Assembly (2023-present) and state assemblymember from the 29th district (2018-present)

Labor unions

- California Labor Federation
- SEIU-UHW

Political parties

- California Democratic Party
Samuel P. Sukaton (D)

Organizations

- California Working Families Party
- Our Revolution

=== Results ===
2026 California's 3rd Board of Equalization district election
Primary election
Party	Candidate	Votes	%
Democratic	Mike Gipson	516,324	27.88
Democratic	Samuel Sukaton	337,313	18.21
Democratic	Yvonne Yiu	236,627	12.78
Republican	Carlo Basail	194,323	10.49
Republican	Rey Portela	186,451	10.07
Democratic	Rudy Bermudez	111,616	6.03
Republican	Stephan Hohil	106,141	5.73
Democratic	Baru Sanchez	105,086	5.67
No party preference	Marie Manvel	30,513	1.65
Democratic	Zhijing Liu	27,760	1.50
Total votes		1,852,154	100.00
General election
Democratic	Mike Gipson	1,459,663	55.6%
Democratic	Samuel Sukaton	1,118,132	43.4%
Total votes			100.00
Democratic hold			

== District 4 ==
2026 California's 4th State Board of Equalization district election
- November 3, 2026
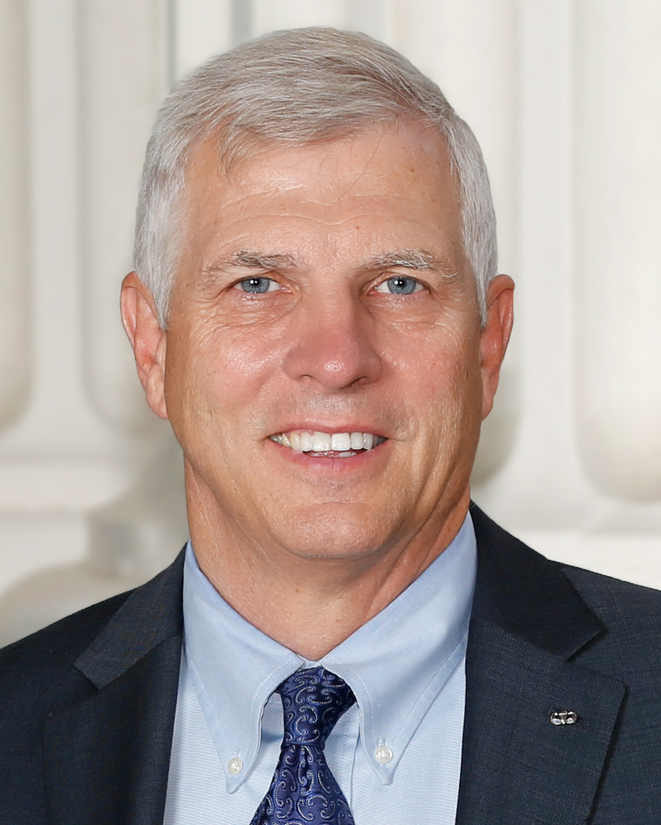

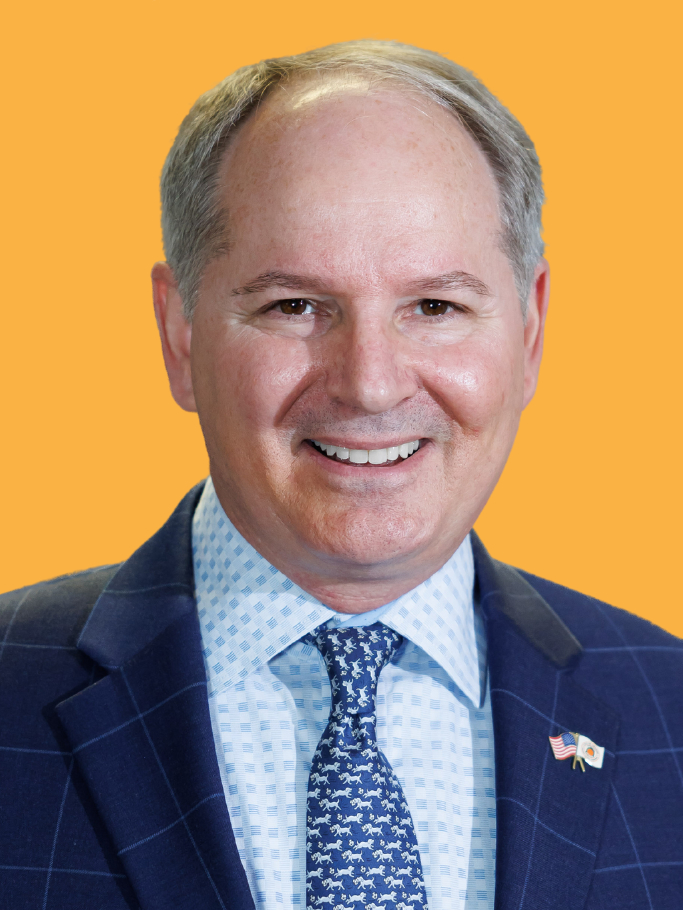
Nominee	Tom Umberg	Denis Bilodeau
Party	Democratic	Republican
Popular vote	1,943,394	1,363,275
Percentage	58.8%	41.2%
- Bilodeau: 30–40% 40–50% Umberg: 50–60% 60–70%
Board of Equalization member before election
Mike Schaefer
Democratic
Elected Board of Equalization member
Tom Umberg
Democratic

The incumbent is Democrat Mike Schaefer, who was re-elected in 2022 with 58.8% of the vote. He was term-limited and ineligible to run for re-election, instead running for California's 48th congressional district. District 4 is in Southern California and encompasses a portion of Greater Los Angeles, including the entirety of Orange County, Riverside County, San Diego County, and Imperial County, and the cities of Chino, Chino Hills, Ontario, Rancho Cucamonga, and Upland in San Bernardino County.

=== Candidates ===
==== Advanced to general ====
- Denis Bilodeau (Republican), Orange city councilmember and Orange County Water District board member
- Tom Umberg (Democratic), state senator from the 34th district

==== Eliminated in primary ====
- Cody Petterson (Democratic), member of the San Diego Unified School District Board of Education
- Martin Arias (Democratic), taxpayer advocate in San Diego County accessor office
- Gardner Osborne (Libertarian)

==== Withdrawn ====
- Chris Duncan (Democratic), former San Clemente city councilmember (ran for California State Senate, endorsed Tom Umberg)

=== Endorsements ===
Tom Umberg (D)

U.S. senators

- Adam Schiff, California

U.S. representatives

- Lou Correa, CA-46
- Dave Min, CA-47
- Derek Tran, CA-45
- Mike Levin, CA-49

Statewide officials

- Gavin Newsom, Governor of California
- Sally Lieber, California Board of Equalization member from the 2nd district

Labor unions

- California Labor Federation
- SEIU-UHW
- California School Employees Association
- United Farm Workers
- California Teachers Association
- United Food and Commercial Workers Western States Council
- National Union of Healthcare Workers
- California Federation of Teachers
- California School Employees Association
- International Brotherhood of Electrical Workers, Local 11
- Orange County Labor Federation

Political party organizations

- California Young Democrats
- San Diego County Democratic Party (co-endorsement)
- Iranian American Democrats of California
- Newport Beach Women's Democratic Club

Political organizations

- VoteVets
- Equality California
Denis Bilodeau (R)

Organizations

- Howard Jarvis Taxpayers Association (co-endorsement with Arias)
- Reform California

Political party organizations

- Imperial County Republican Central Committee
- California Republican Party
- Republican Party of Orange County
Martin Arias (D)

Political party organizations

- San Diego County Democratic Party (co-endorsement)

Organizations

- Howard Jarvis Taxpayers Association (co-endorsement with Bilodeau)
Cody Petterson (D)

U.S. representatives

- Juan Vargas, CA-46

Statewide officials

- Mike Schaefer, California Board of Equalization member from the 4th district

State legislators

- Akilah Weber Pierson, SD-39
- Tasha Boerner, AD-77

Political party organizations

- San Diego County Democratic Party (co-endorsement)
- Our Revolution
- San Diego County Young Democrats

=== Post-primary endorsements ===
Tom Umberg (D)

Political parties

- California Democratic Party
- Democrats of the Desert
- San Diego Democrats for Equality
- Fallbrook Democratic Club

Political Organizations

- Planned Parenthood Affiliates of California
- Council on American–Islamic Relations Action

Labor Unions

- California State Building and Construction Trades Council
- California State Retirees
- Association of California State Supervisors

=== Results ===
2026 California's 4th Board of Equalization district election
Primary election
Party	Candidate	Votes	%
Republican	Denis Bilodeau	972,838	45.06
Democratic	Tom Umberg	446,715	20.69
Democratic	Cody Petterson	397,057	18.39
Democratic	Martin Arias	308,330	14.28
Libertarian	Gardner C. Osborne	33,860	1.57
Total votes		2,158,800	100.00
General election
Democratic	Tom Umberg	1,943,394	58.8%
Republican	Denis Bilodeau	1,363,275	41.2%
Total votes			100.00
Democratic hold			
