= 2022 California State Board of Equalization election =

2022 California State Board of Equalization elections
- November 8, 2022

All 4 seats on the California State Board of Equalization
	Majority party	Minority party	Third party
Party	Democratic	Republican	No party preference
Last election	3	1	0
Seats before	3	1	0
Seats won	3	1	0
Seat change	Steady	Steady	Steady
Popular vote	6,854,999	2,318,229	623,017
Percentage	69.9%	23.7%	6.4%
- Democratic: 60–70% 70–80% 100% Republican: 50–60% Winners: Democratic hold Republican hold

The 2022 California State Board of Equalization elections took place on November 8, 2022, to elect all four seats of the State Board of Equalization, with the non-partisan blanket primary election taking place on June 7, 2022.

== Overview ==
California State Board of Equalization primary election, 2022
Party	Votes		Candidates	Advancing to general	Seats contesting
Party	No.	%	Candidates	Advancing to general	Seats contesting
Democratic Party	3,596,705	61.10%	10	5	4
Republican Party	2,615,705	34.63%	9	2	2
No party preference	43,084	4.27%	1	1	1
Total	6,452,940	100.0%	20	8	Steady

California State Board of Equalization general election, 2022
Party	Candidates	Votes		Seats			
Party	Candidates	No.	%	Before	After	+/–	%
Democratic Party	4	6,854,999	69.9%	3	3	Steady	75.0%
Republican Party	3	2,318,229	23.7%	1	1	Steady	25.0%
No party preference	1	623,017	6.4%	0	0	Steady	0.0%
Total	8	11,901,189	100.0%	4	4	Steady	100.0%

Popular vote
Democratic	69.9%
Republican	23.7%
Independent	6.4%

Board of Equalization seats
Democratic	75.0%
Republican	25.0%

Board of Equalization District	Incumbent	Party	Elected officeholder	Party
1st	Ted Gaines	Republican	Ted Gaines	Republican
2nd	Malia Cohen	Democratic	Sally Lieber	Democratic
3rd	Tony Vazquez	Democratic	Tony Vazquez	Democratic
4th	Mike Schaefer	Democratic	Mike Schaefer	Democratic

== District 1 ==
2022 California's 1st State Board of Equalization district election
- November 8, 2022
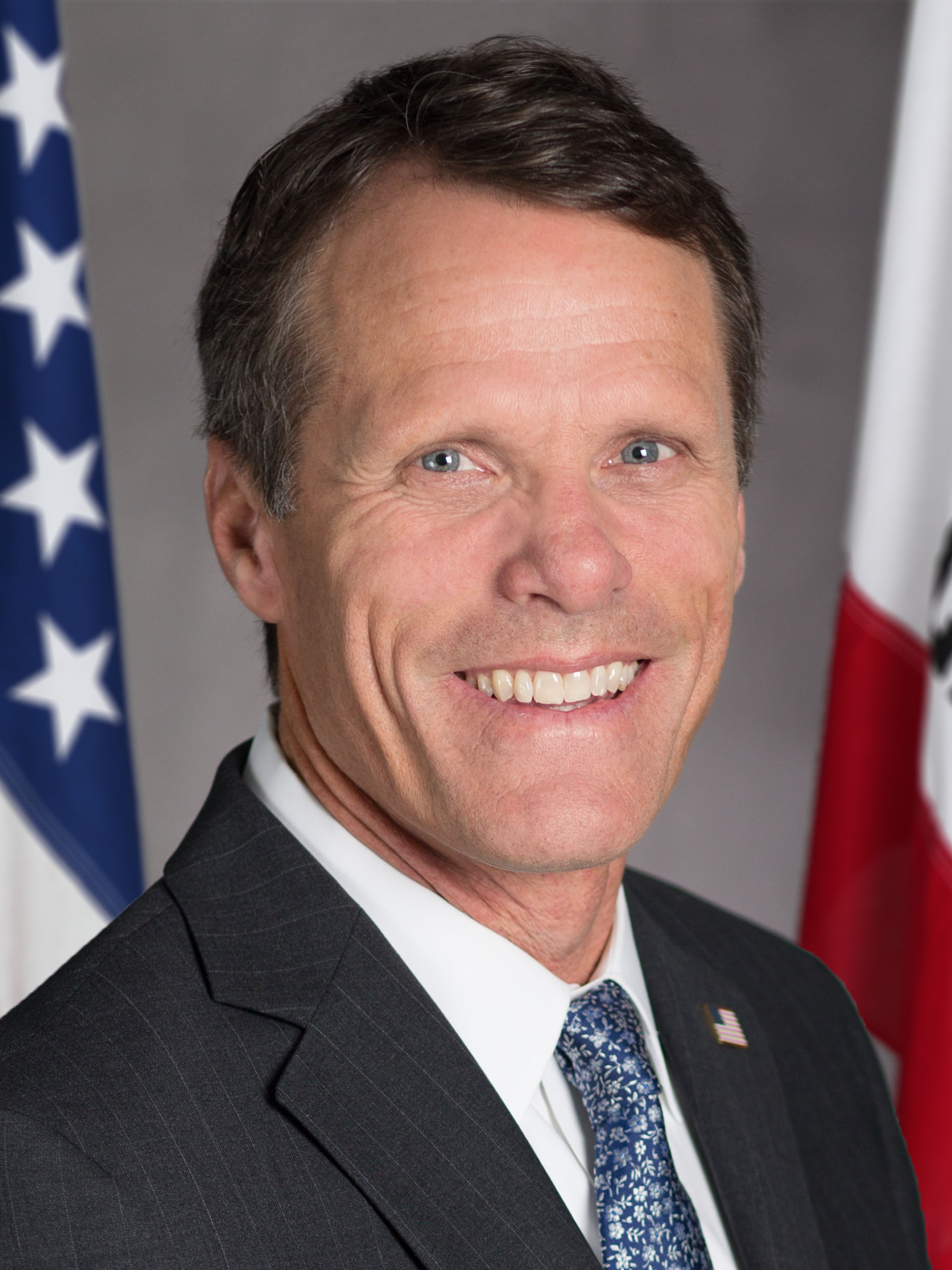

Nominee	Ted Gaines	Jose Altamirano
Party	Republican	Democratic
Popular vote	1,390,533	1,114,423
Percentage	55.5%	44.5%
- Gaines: 40–50% 50–60% 70–80% 80–90% Altamirano: 30–40% 50–60% 60–70%
Board of Equalization member before election
Ted Gaines
Republican
Elected Board of Equalization member
Ted Gaines
Republican

The incumbent was Republican Ted Gaines, who was elected in 2018 with 51.4% of the vote. He was running for reelection.

=== Candidates ===
- Jose Altamirano (D), business operations manager
- Ted Gaines (R), incumbent member of the Board of Equalization
- Braden Murphy (D), father
- Nader Shahatit (D), tax consultant

=== Results ===
California's 1st Board of Equalization district, 2022
Primary election
Party	Candidate	Votes	%
Republican	Ted Gaines (incumbent)	858,912	55.1
Democratic	Jose Altamirano	334,818	21.5
Democratic	Braden Murphy	225,428	14.5
Democratic	Nader Shahatit	139,922	9.0
Total votes		1,559,080	100.0
General election
Republican	Ted Gaines (incumbent)	1,390,533	55.5
Democratic	Jose Altamirano	1,114,423	44.5
Total votes		2,504,956	100.0
Republican hold			

== District 2 ==
2022 California's 2nd State Board of Equalization district election
- November 8, 2022
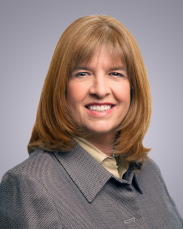

Nominee	Sally Lieber	Peter Coe Verbica
Party	Democratic	Republican
Popular vote	2,146,948	927,700
Percentage	69.8%	30.2%
- Lieber: 40–50% 50–60% 60–70% 70–80% 80–90% Verbica: 40–50% 50–60%
Board of Equalization member before election
Malia Cohen
Democratic
Elected Board of Equalization member
Sally Lieber
Democratic

The incumbent was Democrat Malia Cohen, who was elected in 2018 with 72.8% of the vote. Cohen was running in the 2022 California State Controller election.

=== Candidates ===
- Michela Alioto-Pier (D), member of the San Francisco Board of Supervisors (2004–2011), granddaughter of San Francisco Mayor Joseph Alioto
- Sally Lieber (D), assemblymember 2002–2008
- Peter Coe Verbica (R), investment advisor, family donated heart of Henry Coe State Park, Chair of Investment Committee, San Jose Symphony Foundation

=== Endorsements ===
Michela Alioto-Pier (D)

Organizations

- California Democratic Party (co-endorsed with Sally Lieber)
Sally Lieber (D)

Organizations

- California Democratic Party (co-endorsed with Michela Alioto-Pier)

=== Results ===
California's 2nd Board of Equalization district, 2022
Primary election
Party	Candidate	Votes	%
Democratic	Sally Lieber	1,034,551	53.0
Republican	Peter Coe Verbica	549,455	28.2
Democratic	Michela Alioto-Pier	366,406	18.8
Total votes		1,950,412	100.0
General election
Democratic	Sally Lieber	2,146,948	69.8
Republican	Peter Coe Verbica	927,700	32.2
Total votes		3,074,648	100.0
Democratic hold			

== District 3 ==
2022 California's 3rd State Board of Equalization district election
- November 8, 2022
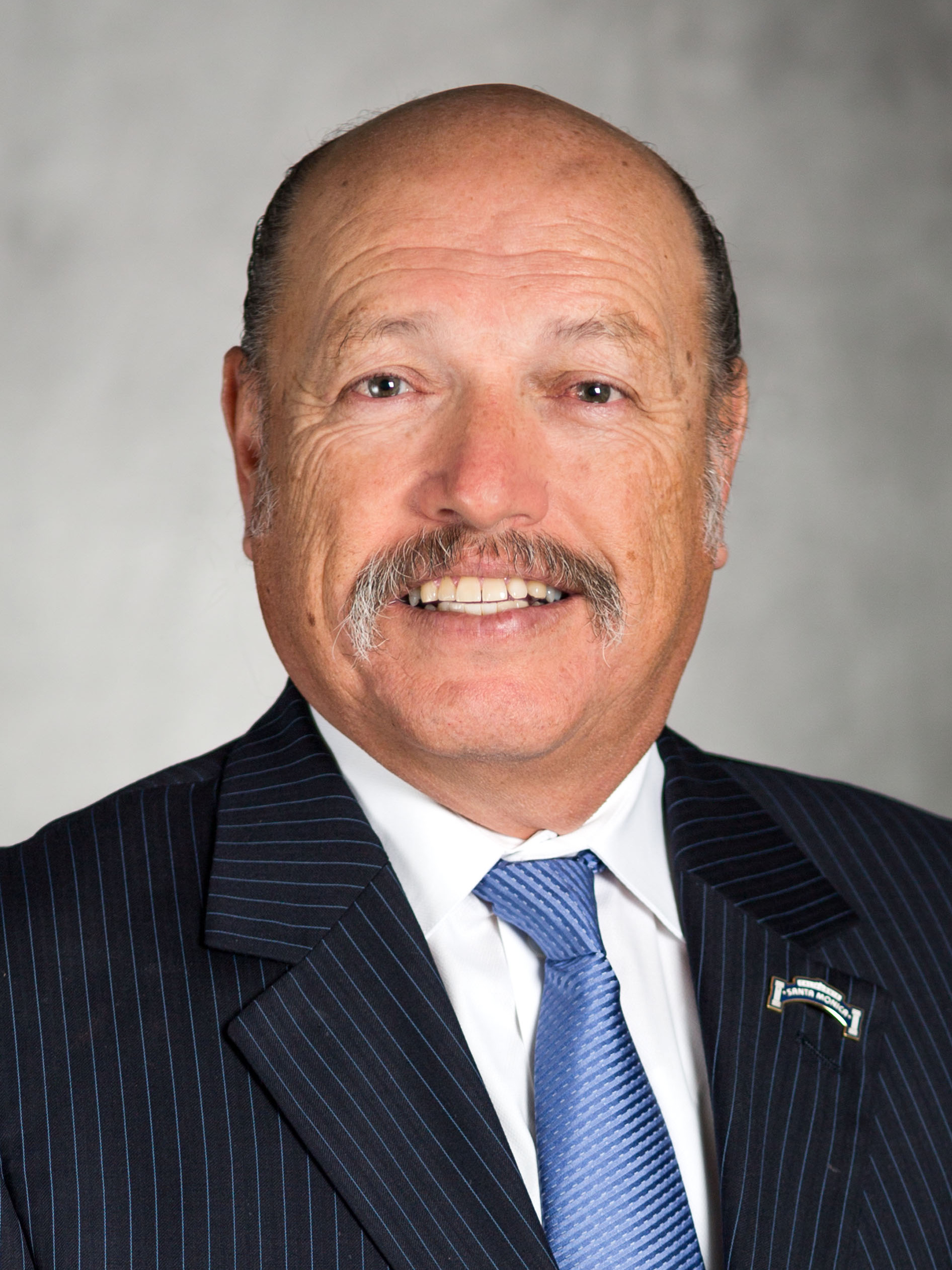

Nominee	Tony Vazquez	Y. Marie Manvel
Party	Democratic	No party preference
Popular vote	1,484,626	623,017
Percentage	70.4%	29.6%
- Vazquez: 60–70% 70–80%
Board of Equalization member before election
Tony Vazquez
Democratic
Elected Board of Equalization member
Tony Vazquez
Democratic

The incumbent was Democrat Tony Vazquez, who was elected in 2018 with 69.9% of the vote. He was running for reelection.

=== Candidates ===
- Y. Marie Manvel (NPP)
- John Mendoza (D)
- Tony Vazquez (D), incumbent member of the Board of Equalization

=== Endorsements ===
Tony Vazquez (D)

Organizations

- California Democratic Party

=== Results ===
California's 3rd Board of Equalization district, 2022
Primary election
Party	Candidate	Votes	%
Democratic	Tony Vazquez (incumbent)	849,250	66.5
No party preference	Y. Marie Manvel	275,830	21.6
Democratic	John Mendoza	144,153	11.3
Republican	G. Rick Marshall (write-in)	8,769	0.7
Total votes		1,278,002	100.0
General election
Democratic	Tony Vazquez (incumbent)	1,484,626	70.4
No party preference	Y. Marie Manvel	623,017	29.6
Total votes		2,107,643	100.0
Democratic hold			

== District 4 ==
2022 California's 4th State Board of Equalization district election
- November 8, 2022
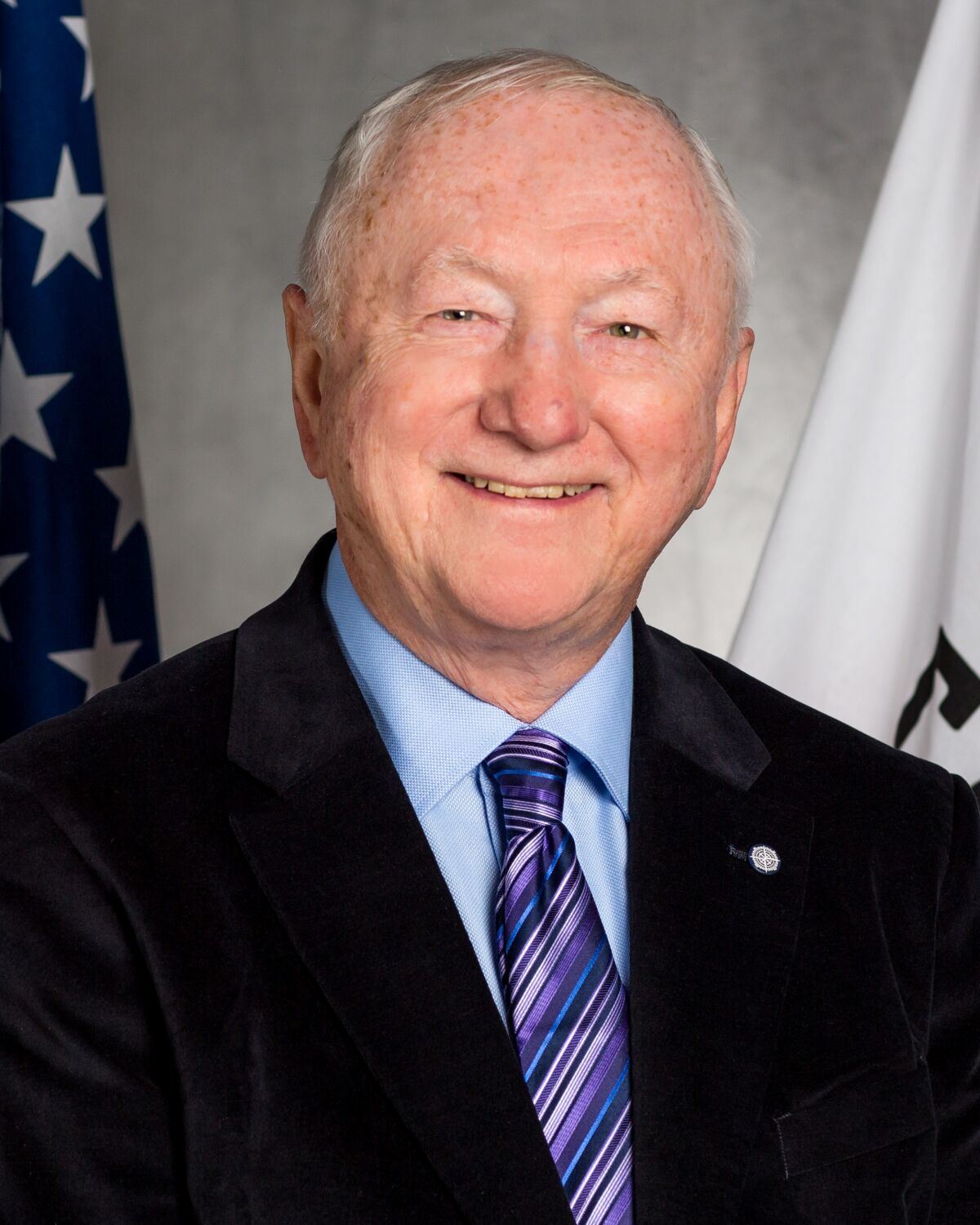

Nominee	Mike Schaefer	David Dodson
Party	Democratic	Democratic
Popular vote	1,241,062	867,945
Percentage	58.8%	41.2%
- Schaefer: 30–40% 50–60% 60–70% Dodson: 50–60%
Board of Equalization member before election
Mike Schaefer
Democratic
Elected Board of Equalization member
Mike Schaefer
Democratic

The incumbent was Democrat Mike Schaefer, who was elected in 2018 with 52.2% of the vote. He was running for reelection.

=== Candidates ===
- Denis R. Bilodeau (R), taxpayer advocate and engineer
- David Dodson (D), California State Board of Equalization, Supervisor
- Randell R. Economy (R), small business owner
- Matthew Harper (R), Mayor of Huntington Beach (2013–2014), Member of the California State Assembly, 74th district (2014–2018)
- John F. Kelly (R), small business owner
- Erik Peterson (R), businessman and Huntington Beach councilmember
- Mike Schaefer (D), incumbent member of the Board of Equalization

=== Endorsements ===
Mike Schaefer (D)

Organizations

- California Democratic Party

=== Results ===
California's 4th Board of Equalization district, 2022
Primary election
Party	Candidate	Votes	%
Democratic	Mike Schaefer (incumbent)	597,948	35.9
Democratic	David Dodson	249,971	15.0
Republican	Denis R. Bilodeau	236,625	14.2
Republican	Matthew Harper	183,330	11.0
Republican	Erik Peterson	180,278	10.8
Republican	Randell R. Economy	109,975	6.6
Republican	John F. Kelly	107,319	6.4
Total votes		1,665,446	100.0
General election
Democratic	Mike Schaefer (incumbent)	1,241,062	58.8
Democratic	David Dodson	867,945	41.2
Total votes		2,109,007	100.0
Democratic hold			
