= 2018 California State Board of Equalization election =

2018 California State Board of Equalization elections
- November 6, 2018

All 4 seats on the California State Board of Equalization
	Majority party	Minority party
Party	Democratic	Republican
Last election	2	2
Seats before	2	2
Seats won	3	1
Seat change	▲1	▼1
Popular vote	7,293,298	4,607,891
Percentage	61.3%	38.7%
- Results: Democratic hold Democratic gain Republican hold

The 2018 California State Board of Equalization elections were held on Tuesday, November 6, 2018. The primary election was held on June 5, 2018. All four seats on the State Board of Equalization were contested.

The board's members serve four-year terms and are limited to two terms.

A nonpartisan blanket primary was used for the election, starting with the primary in June 2018. The top-two primary finishers in each district, regardless of party, advanced to the general election in November. Republicans lost one seat to the Democrats, leaving only one Republican board member remaining.

== Overview ==
=== Overall results ===
California State Board of Equalization primary election, 2018
Party	Votes		Candidates	Advancing to general	Seats contesting
Party	No.	%	Candidates	Advancing to general	Seats contesting
Democratic Party	3,596,705	57.5%	13	4	4
Republican Party	2,615,705	41.8%	9	4	4
No party preference	43,084	0.7%	1	0	0
Total	6,255,494	100.0%	23	8	Steady

California State Board of Equalization general election, 2018
Party	Candidates	Votes		Seats			
Party	Candidates	No.	%	Before	After	+/–	%
Democratic Party	4	7,293,298	61.3%	2	3	▲1	75.0%
Republican Party	4	4,607,891	38.7%	2	1	▼1	25.0%
Total	8	11,901,189	100.0%	4	4	Steady	100.0%

Popular vote
Democratic	61.3%
Republican	38.7%

Board of Equalization seats
Democratic	75.0%
Republican	25.0%

==== By district ====
Results of the 2018 California state Board of Equalization election by district:

District	Democratic		Republican		Total		Result
District	Votes	%	Votes	%	Votes	%	Result
District 1	1,355,782	48.6%	1,436,547	51.4%	2,792,329	100.0%	Republican hold
District 2	2,482,171	72.8%	927,949	27.2%	3,410,120	100.0%	Democratic hold
District 3	1,895,972	69.9%	815,829	30.1%	2,711,801	100.0%	Democratic hold
District 4	1,559,373	52.2%	1,427,566	47.8%	2,986,939	100.0%	Democratic gain
Total	7,293,298	61.3%	4,607,891	38.7%	11,901,189	100.0%	

Board of Equalization District	Incumbent	Party	Elected officeholder	Party
1st	George Runner	Republican	Ted Gaines	Republican
2nd	Fiona Ma	Democratic	Malia Cohen	Democratic
3rd	Jerome Horton	Democratic	Tony Vazquez	Democratic
4th	Diane Harkey	Republican	Mike Schaefer	Democratic

=== Close races ===
Seats where the margin of victory was under 5%:

1. State Board of Equalization district 1, 2.8%
2. State Board of Equalization district 4, 4.4%

== Detailed results ==
=== District 1 ===
The incumbent was Republican George Runner, who was term-limited and ineligible to run for reelection. Runner was succeeded by Republican Ted Gaines.

==== Results ====
2018 California's 1st Board of Equalization district primary results by county
Map legend
- Hallinan—50–60%
- Hallinan—40–50%
- Hallinan—30–40%
- Gaines—30–40%
- Gaines—40–50%
- Gaines—50–60%
- Conway—30–40%
- Conway—40–50%

2018 California's 1st Board of Equalization district general election results by county
Map legend
- Gaines—70–80%
- Gaines—60–70%
- Gaines—50–60%
- Hallinan—50–60%
- Hallinan—60–70%

California's 1st Board of Equalization district, 2018
Primary election
Party	Candidate	Votes	%
Democratic	Tom Hallinan	606,159	39.4
Republican	Ted Gaines	500,879	32.6
Republican	Connie Conway	283,477	18.4
Republican	David Evans	147,473	9.6
Total votes		1,537,988	100.0
General election
Republican	Ted Gaines	1,436,547	51.4
Democratic	Tom Hallinan	1,355,782	48.6
Total votes		2,792,329	100.0
Republican hold			

General election results by county

Red represents counties won by Gaines. Blue represents counties won by Hallinan.

General election results by county
County	Gaines (R)		Hallinan (D)		Total
County	Votes	%	Votes	%	Votes
Alpine	229	38.4%	367	61.6%	596
Amador	11,038	64.6%	6,055	35.4%	17,093
Butte	45,565	53.1%	40,251	46.9%	85,816
Calaveras	13,402	64.1%	7,511	35.9%	20,913
El Dorado	52,363	60.4%	34,382	39.6%	86,745
Fresno	126,507	52.0%	116,887	48.0%	243,394
Inyo	3,960	56.5%	3,049	43.5%	7,009
Kern	119,379	60.0%	79,589	40.0%	198,968
Kings	17,920	60.4%	11,762	39.6%	29,684
Lassen	6,858	77.6%	1,981	22.4%	8,839
Los Angeles	148,406	39.6%	226,007	60.4%	374,413
Madera	23,116	61.5%	14,473	38.5%	37,589
Mariposa	4,960	61.6%	3,095	38.4%	8,055
Merced	27,557	47.9%	29,940	52.1%	57,497
Modoc	2,603	76.6%	796	23.4%	3,399
Mono	2,193	46.7%	2,503	53.3%	4,696
Nevada	25,471	48.7%	26,862	51.3%	52,333
Placer	103,211	60.4%	67,536	39.6%	170,747
Plumas	5,755	64.0%	3,234	36.0%	8,989
Sacramento	215,401	43.6%	278,817	56.4%	494,218
San Bernardino	151,162	53.1%	133,297	46.9%	284,459
San Joaquin	91,252	48.5%	96,811	51.5%	188,063
Shasta	48,646	70.9%	19,983	29.1%	68,629
Sierra	1,053	63.9%	596	36.1%	1,649
Siskiyou	10,775	60.4%	7,055	39.6%	17,380
Stanislaus	76,110	49.9%	77,544	50.1%	152,654
Sutter	18,334	63.7%	10,442	36.3%	28,776
Tulare	57,084	58.5%	40,413	41.5%	97,497
Tuolumne	14,172	61.5%	8,855	38.5%	18,754
Yuba	12,065	64.3%	6,689	35.7%	18,754
Totals	1,436,547	51.4%	1,355,782	48.6%	2,792,329

=== District 2 ===
The incumbent was Democrat Fiona Ma, who was elected state treasurer. Ma was succeeded by Democrat Malia Cohen.

==== Results ====
2018 California's 2nd Board of Equalization district primary results by county
Map legend
- Cohen—50–60%
- Cohen—40–50%
- Cohen—30–40%
- Burns—30–40%
- Burns—40–50%
- Burns—50–60%
- Burns—60–70%

2018 California's 2nd Board of Equalization district general election results by county
Map legend
- Cohen—80–90%
- Cohen—70–80%
- Cohen—60–70%
- Cohen—50–60%
- Burns—50–60%
- Burns—60–70%
- Burns—70–80%

California's 2nd Board of Equalization district, 2018
Primary election
Party	Candidate	Votes	%
Democratic	Malia Cohen	723,355	38.7
Republican	Mark Burns	502,143	26.9
Democratic	Cathleen Galgiani	480,887	25.7
Democratic	Barry Chang	163,102	8.7
Total votes		1,869,487	100.0
General election
Democratic	Malia Cohen	2,482,171	72.8
Republican	Mark Burns	927,949	27.2
Total votes		3,410,120	100.0
Democratic hold			

General election results by county

Blue represents counties won by Cohen. Red represents counties won by Burns.

General election results by county
County	Burns (R)		Cohen (D)		Total
County	Votes	%	Votes	%	Votes
Alameda	103,612	18.8%%	448,170	81.2%	551,782
Colusa	3,425	61.7%	2,128	38.3%	5,553
Contra Costa	122,204	30.9%	272,804	69.1%	395,008
Del Norte	4,720	57.7%	3,458	42.3%	8,178
Glenn	5,535	68.1%	2,589	38.9%	8,124
Humboldt	17,436	34.0%	33,850	66.0%	51,286
Lake	11,049	46.3%	9,529	53.7%	20,578
Marin	25,923	21.2%	96,214	78.8%	122,137
Mendocino	10,308	32.0%	21,954	68.0%	32,262
Monterey	36,985	32.5%	76,665	67.5%	113,650
Napa	18,596	34.3%	35,619	65.7%	54,214
San Benito	8,081	41.4%	11,442	58.6%	19,523
San Francisco	47,753	14.0%	292,973	86.0%	340,726
San Luis Obispo	56,831	47.0%	64,104	53.0%	120,935
San Mateo	66,272	24.4%	205,804	75.6%	272,076
Santa Barbara	52,216	38.1%	91,502	61.9%	143,718
Santa Clara	163,979	27.8%	425,397	72.2%	589,376
Santa Cruz	25,324	22.1%	89,496	77.9%	114,820
Solano	52,116	36.6%	90,320	63.4%	142,436
Sonoma	53,770	26.5%	149,191	73.5%	202,961
Tehama	14,374	70.1%	6,129	29.9%	20,503
Trinity	2,885	55.6%	2,308	44.4%	5,193
Yolo	22,075	31.1%	49,005	68.9%	71,080
Totals	927,949	27.2%	2,482,171	72.8%	3,410,120

=== District 3 ===
The incumbent was Democrat Jerome Horton, who was term-limited and ineligible to run for reelection. Horton was succeeded by Democrat Tony Vazquez.

==== Results ====
2018 California's 3rd Board of Equalization district primary results by county
Map legend
- Marshall—40–50%
- Marshall—30–40%
- Marshall—20–30%

2018 California's 3rd Board of Equalization district general election results by county
Map legend
- Vazquez—70–80%
- Vazquez—50–60%
- Marshall—50–60%

California's 3rd Board of Equalization district, 2018
Primary election
Party	Candidate	Votes	%
Republican	G. Rick Marshall	335,570	26.4
Democratic	Tony Vazquez	255,988	20.2
Democratic	Cheryl C. Turner	214,916	16.9
Democratic	Scott Svonkin	170,254	13.4
Democratic	Nancy Pearlman	160,105	12.6
Democratic	Doug Kriegel	44,962	3.5
Democratic	Ben Pak	44,588	3.5
No party preference	Micheál "Me-Haul" O'Leary	43,084	3.4
Total votes		1,269,467	100.0
General election
Democratic	Tony Vazquez	1,895,972	69.9
Republican	G. Rick Marshall	815,829	30.1
Total votes		2,711,801	100.0
Democratic hold			

General election results by county

Blue represents counties won by Vazquez. Red represents counties won by Marshall.

General election results by county
County	Marshall (R)		Vazquez (D)		Total
County	Votes	%	Votes	%	Votes
Los Angeles	665,421	27.9%	1,723,801	72.1%	2,389,222
Orange	13,983	53.6%	12,122	46.4%	26,105
Ventura	136,425	46.0%	160,049	54.0%	296,474
Totals	815,829	30.1%	1,895,972	69.9%	2,711,801

=== District 4 ===
The incumbent was Republican Diane Harkey, who retired to run for California's 49th congressional district. Harkey was succeeded by Democrat Mike Schaefer, giving Democrats a majority on the Board of Equalization.

==== Endorsements ====
Joel Anderson (R)

Notable individuals and organizations

- Howard Jarvis Taxpayers Association

==== Results ====
California's 4th Board of Equalization district primary results by county
Map legend
- Anderson—30–40%
- Anderson—20–30%
- Lopez-Maddox—20–30%

California's 4th Board of Equalization district general election results by county
Map legend
- Schaefer—60–70%
- Schaefer—50–60%
- Anderson—50–60%

California's 4th Board of Equalization district, 2018
Party	Candidate	Votes	%
Republican	Joel Anderson	492,122	31.2
Democratic	Mike Schaefer	269,044	17.0
Republican	John F. Kelly	263,294	16.7
Democratic	David Dodson	234,534	14.9
Democratic	Ken Lopez-Maddox	228,811	14.5
Republican	Jim Stieringer	58,642	3.7
Republican	Nader F. Shahatit	32,105	2.0
Total votes		1,578,552	100.0
General election
Democratic	Mike Schaefer	1,559,373	52.2
Republican	Joel Anderson	1,427,566	47.8
Total votes		2,986,939	100.0
Democratic gain from Republican			

General election results by county

Blue represents counties won by Schaefer. Red represents counties won by Anderson.

General election results by county
County	Anderson (R)		Schaefer (D)		Total
County	Votes	%	Votes	%	Votes
Imperial	12,381	37.9%	20,321	62.1%	32,702
Orange	531,307	51.3%	503,939	48.7%	1,035,246
Riverside	310,294	50.1%	309,535	49.9%	619,829
San Bernardino	87,306	41.4%	123,467	58.6%	210,773
San Diego	486,278	44.7%	602,111	55.3%	1,088,389
Totals	1,427,566	47.8%	1,559,373	52.2%	2,986,939
