= Electoral history of Joel Anderson =

List of elections featuring Joel Anderson as a candidate

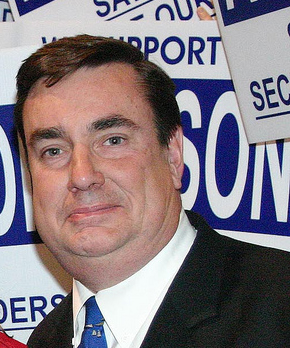
Joel Anderson

Joel Anderson is a supervisor of the San Diego County Board of Supervisors. He previously served as a California state senator, assemblyperson, and board member of a municipal water district.

== California State Assembly elections ==
=== 1998 ===
1998 California State Assembly primary election for the 75th district
Party	Candidate	Votes	%
Republican	Charlene Zettel	28,952	45.14
Republican	Joel Anderson	20,131	31.38
Republican	Mark Price	15,061	23.48

=== 2006 ===
2006 California State Assembly primary election for the 77th district
Party	Candidate	Votes	%
Republican	Joel Anderson	12,433	32.0
Republican	Jack Dale	11,575	29.8
Republican	Debbie Miller Beyer	7,163	18.3
Republican	Nancy Beecham	4,278	10.9
Republican	William (Bill) Jenkin	3,516	9.0

2006 California State Assembly election for the 77th district
Party	Candidate	Votes	%
Republican	Joel Anderson	69,436	60.6
Democratic	Christopher R. Larkin	41,292	36.0
Libertarian	Rich Belitz	3,921	3.4

=== 2008 ===
2008 California State Assembly primary election for the 77th district
Party	Candidate	Votes	%
Republican	Joel Anderson	35,029	100.0

2008 California State Assembly election for the 77th district
Party	Candidate	Votes	%
Republican	Joel Anderson (incumbent)	92,621	55.5
Democratic	Raymond Lutz	64,949	38.9
Libertarian	Richard G. Belitz	9,503	5.6

== Padre Dam Municipal Water District election (2002) ==
2002 Padre Dam Municipal Water District election for the 5th division
Party	Candidate	Votes	%
Nonpartisan	Joel C. Anderson	3,247	45.2
Nonpartisan	Dan McMillan	2,746	38.2
Nonpartisan	Michael L. George	1,186	16.5

== California State Senate elections ==
=== 2010 ===
2010 California State Senate primary election for the 36th district
Party	Candidate	Votes	%
Republican	Joel Anderson	43,465	40.3
Republican	Jeff Stone	33,478	31.1
Republican	Kenneth C. Dickson	20,858	19.3
Republican	Greg Stephens	10,120	9.3

2010 California State Senate election for the 36th district
Party	Candidate	Votes	%
Republican	Joel Anderson (incumbent)	193,573	63.2
Democratic	Paul Clay	101,112	33.0
Libertarian	Michael S. Metti	11,737	3.8

=== 2014 ===
2014 California State Senate primary election for the 38th district
Party	Candidate	Votes	%
Republican	Joel Anderson (incumbent)	87,933	71.1
Democratic	Fotios "Frank" Tsimboukakis	35,656	28.9

2014 California State Senate election for the 38th district
Party	Candidate	Votes	%
Republican	Joel Anderson (incumbent)	146,510	68.9
Democratic	Fotios "Frank" Tsimboukakis	66,066	31.1

== California State Board of Equalization election (2018) ==
2018 California State Board of Equalization primary election for the 4th district
Party	Candidate	Votes	%
Republican	Joel Anderson	492,122	31.2
Democratic	Mike Schaefer	269,044	17.0
Republican	John F. Kelly	263,294	16.7
Democratic	David Dodson	234,534	14.9
Democratic	Ken Lopez-Maddox	228,811	14.5
Republican	Jim Stieringer	58,642	3.7
Republican	Nader F. Shahatit	32,105	2.0

2018 California State Board of Equalization election for the 4th district
Party	Candidate	Votes	%
Democratic	Mike Schaefer	1,559,373	52.2
Republican	Joel Anderson	1,427,566	47.8

== San Diego County Republican Party central committee election (2020) ==
2020 Republican Party county central committee election for the 77th Assembly district
Party	Candidate	Votes	%
Republican	Joel Anderson	34,043	17.82
Republican	Frank I. Hilliker	24,329	12.74
Republican	Jim Kelly	17,438	9.13
Republican	Dustin Trotter	15,206	7.96
Republican	Mark Bryan	14,590	7.64
Republican	Dan Bickford	12,772	6.69
Republican	Baron T. "Barry" Willis	12,222	6.40
Republican	Gary G. Kreep	11,724	6.14
Republican	Ron Nehring	10,223	5.35
Republican	Steve Robak	9,170	4.80
Republican	Jordan Gascon	8,201	4.29
Republican	Christine La Marca	7,429	3.89
Republican	Jill Barto	7,393	3.87
Republican	Mike Harrison	6,285	3.29

== San Diego County Board of Supervisors ==
2020 San Diego County Board of Supervisors primary election for the 2nd district
Party	Candidate	Votes	%
Nonpartisan	Joel Anderson	59,803	35.46
Nonpartisan	Steve Vaus	52,357	31.04
Nonpartisan	Kenya Taylor	45,037	26.70
Nonpartisan	Brian Sesko	11,465	6.80

2020 San Diego County Board of Supervisors election for the 2nd district
Party	Candidate	Votes	%
Nonpartisan	Joel Anderson	145,103	50.05
Nonpartisan	Steve Vaus	144,821	49.95

2024 San Diego County Board of Supervisors District 2 election
Party	Candidate	Votes	%
Nonpartisan	Joel Anderson (incumbent)	155,232	59.81%
Nonpartisan	Gina Jacobs	104,326	40.19%
Total votes		259,558	100.0%
