= California State Board of Equalization =

Tax administration agency of California, United States

Board overview
- Formed: 1879
- Type: Tax administration and fee collection
- Jurisdiction: Government of California
- Headquarters: Sacramento, California
- Employees: 400
- Board executives: Ted Gaines, First District; Sally Lieber, Second District; Tony Vazquez, Third District; Mike Schaefer, Fourth District; Malia Cohen, State Controller
- Website: www.boe.ca.gov

The California State Board of Equalization (BOE) is a public agency charged with tax administration and fee collection in the state of California in the United States. The authorities of the Board attempt to ensure that counties fairly assess property taxes, collect excise taxes on alcoholic beverages, administer the insurance tax program, and other tax collection related activities.

The BOE is the only publicly elected tax commission in the United States. It is made up of four directly elected members, each representing a district for four-year terms, along with the State Controller, who is elected on a statewide basis, serving as the fifth member. Since the passage of Proposition 140 in 1990, board members are limited to two terms in office.

In June 2017, Governor Jerry Brown signed legislation stripping the Board of many of its powers, returning the agency to its original core responsibilities (originating in the State Constitution in 1879).

== History ==
The State Board of Equalization was created in 1879 by the ratification of the second Constitution of California. Its original mandate was to ensure that property tax assessments were uniform and equal across all counties in the state.

Prior to the creation of the state income tax, sales tax, and fuel taxes in the 1930s, California's state government was almost completely supported by property taxes, which were and still are assessed at the county level by elected tax assessors. Assessors were tempted to boost their popularity with county voters by undervaluing voters' property, and thereby lowering their taxes. This presented the risk of counties with honest assessors paying more than their fair share of the burden of operating the state government, so the Board of Equalization was created to equalize the burden.

The California Franchise Tax Board and the Employment Development Department are separately also responsible for collecting taxes. Some have criticized this as inefficient. Efforts to reform the Board were made in the 1940s, 1950s, 1960s, 1990s, and 2000s.

In 1994, Governor Pete Wilson vetoed a plan by the legislature to abolish the Franchise Tax Board and give its responsibilities to the Board of Equalization, explaining in his veto message that the state should have done the opposite. In 2004, Governor Arnold Schwarzenegger released a 2,500-page report seeking to merge the Board with other agencies and then promoted a bill by Assemblywoman Lois Wolk to do just that. The effort failed. In 2008, the agency employed approximately 3,950 people throughout the state.

By 2017, the Board had expanded to collecting $60 billion a year. It collected sales and use taxes, hazardous waste fees, jet fuel taxes, marijuana taxes, and over 30 additional taxes. That year, the Board had 4,700 employees and a $617 million annual budget. Board members were paid a $137,000 annual salary and were each allowed to hire a 12-member staff. Each year, the Board spent at least $3 million on education events where elected members appeared before their constituents.

In March 2017, an audit by the California Department of Finance revealed missing funds and signs of nepotism, leading to calls for the governor to put the Board under a public trustee. In June 2017, the California Department of Justice began a criminal investigation into the members of the Board.

On June 27, 2017, Governor Jerry Brown signed into law legislation, stripping the Board of many of its powers. The legislation created two new departments controlled by the governor responsible for the Board's statutory duties, the California Department of Tax and Fee Administration and the California Office of Tax Appeals.

The Board still has its constitutional powers to review property tax assessments and insurer tax assessments, and its role in the collection of alcohol excise and pipeline taxes. It retained 400 employees, with the rest of its 4,800 workers being shifted to the new departments.

In 2023, constitutional amendment ACA-11 was introduced by Phil Ting in the California State Assembly to abolish the board and redistribute its staff and duties to other state tax agencies. The Los Angeles Times editorial board called for ACA-11 and ACA-9, which would abolish the elected position of California State Superintendent of Public Instruction, to pass the legislature and appear before voters as a ballot proposition. ACA-9 was later withdrawn by its proposer, Kevin McCarty, after opposition from groups including the California Teachers Association and the California Schools Boards Association.

== Equalization districts ==
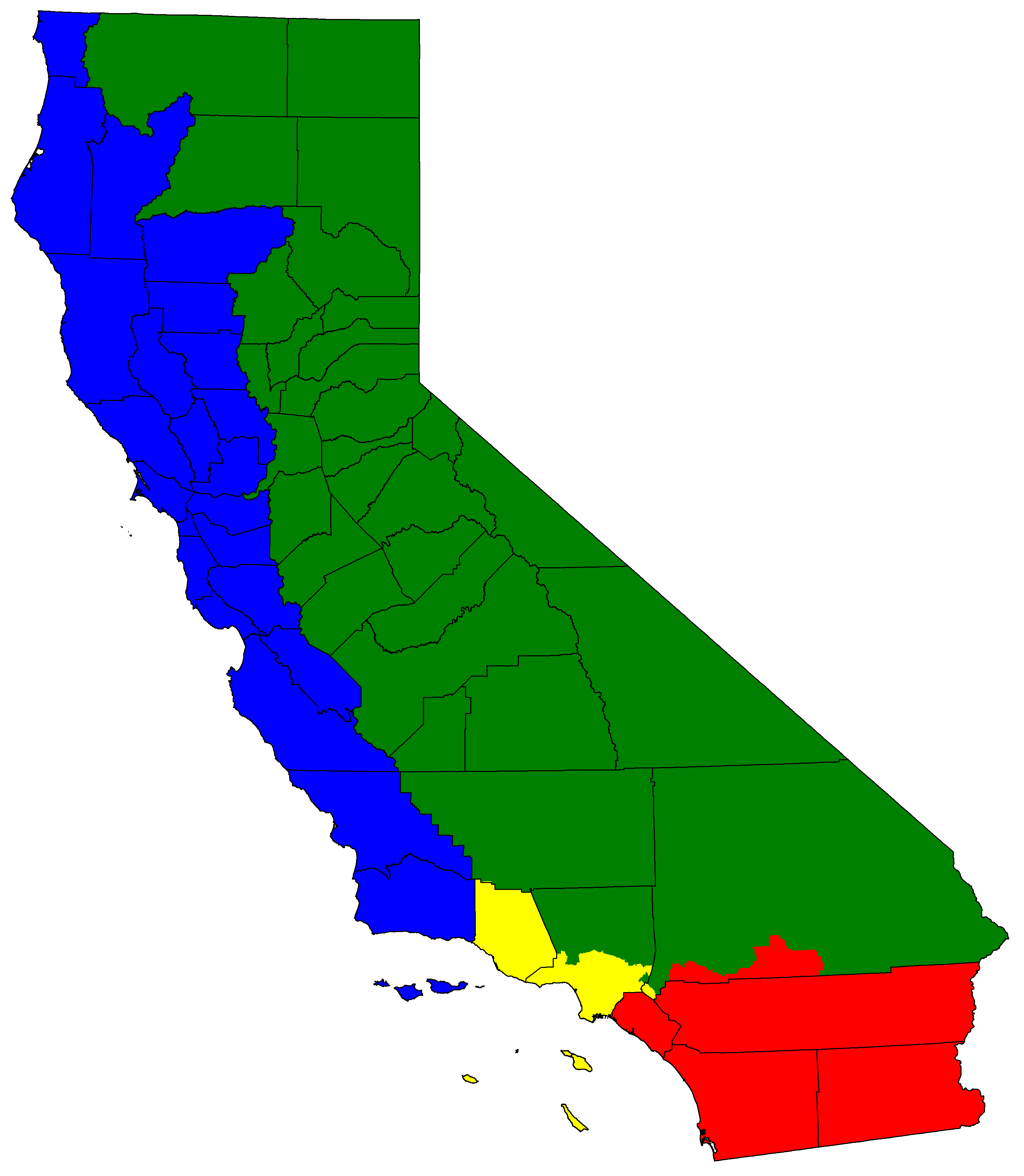
District map effective from January 1, 2015 until January 1, 2023 (left) and district map effective from January 1, 2023 (right) (Interactive version)
First District
Second District
Third District
Fourth District

For the purposes of tax administration, the BOE divides the state into four Equalization districts, each with its own elected board member. District boundaries are redrawn following the decennial census. The latest boundaries were drawn following the 2020 census and had been in effect since January 1, 2023.

=== First district ===
The First Equalization District is made up of the following counties: Alpine, Amador, Butte, Calaveras, Colusa, El Dorado, Fresno, Glenn, Inyo, Kern, Kings, Lassen, Madera, Mariposa, Merced, Modoc, Mono, Nevada, Placer, Plumas, Sacramento, the portion of San Bernardino outside of the San Bernardino panhandle, San Joaquin, Shasta, Sierra, Siskiyou, Solano, Stanislaus, Sutter, Tehama, Tulare, Tuolumne, Yuba, and Yolo.

=== Second district ===
The Second Equalization District is made up of the following counties: Alameda, Contra Costa, Del Norte, Humboldt, Lake, Marin, Mendocino, Monterey, Napa, San Benito, San Francisco, San Luis Obispo, San Mateo, Santa Barbara, Santa Clara, Santa Cruz, Sonoma, Trinity, and Ventura.

=== Third district ===
The Third Equalization District is made up of Los Angeles County.

=== Fourth district ===
The Fourth Equalization District is made up of the following counties: Imperial, Orange, Riverside and San Diego; and a portion of San Bernardino County including the cities of Colton, Fontana, Grand Terrace, Highland, Loma Linda, Redlands, Rialto, San Bernardino, Twentynine Palms, Yucaipa and Yucca Valley.

== Members of the Board of Equalization ==
=== Current members ===
District	Name	Party	Start	Elections
1	Ted Gaines	Republican	January 7, 2019	2018; 2022
2	Sally Lieber	Democratic	January 2, 2023	2022
3	Tony Vazquez	Democratic	January 7, 2019	2018; 2022
4	Mike Schaefer	Democratic	January 7, 2019	2018; 2022
Controller	Malia Cohen, Ex officio	Democratic	January 2, 2023	2022

=== List of members ===
Year	Elections	1st District	2nd District	3rd District	4th District	State Controller (ex officio)
1879	1878	James L. King	Moses M. Drew	Warren Dutton	Tyler D. Heiskel	Daniel M. Kenfield
1880	1878	James L. King	Moses M. Drew	Warren Dutton	Tyler D. Heiskel	Daniel M. Kenfield
1881	1878	James L. King	Moses M. Drew	Warren Dutton	Tyler D. Heiskel	Daniel M. Kenfield
1882	1878	James L. King	Moses M. Drew	Warren Dutton	Tyler D. Heiskel	Daniel M. Kenfield
1883	1882	Charles Gildea	L. C. Morehouse	C. E. Wilcoxon	John Markley	John P. Dunn
1884	1882	Charles Gildea	L. C. Morehouse	C. E. Wilcoxon	John Markley	John P. Dunn
1885	1882	Charles Gildea	L. C. Morehouse	C. E. Wilcoxon	John Markley	John P. Dunn
1886	1882	Charles Gildea	L. C. Morehouse	C. E. Wilcoxon	John Markley	John P. Dunn
1887	1886	Gordon E. Sloss	L. C. Morehouse	C. E. Wilcoxon	John T. Gaffey	John P. Dunn
1888	1886	Gordon E. Sloss	L. C. Morehouse	C. E. Wilcoxon	John T. Gaffey	John P. Dunn
1889	1886	Gordon E. Sloss	L. C. Morehouse	C. E. Wilcoxon	John T. Gaffey	John P. Dunn
1890	1886	Gordon E. Sloss	L. C. Morehouse	C. E. Wilcoxon	John T. Gaffey	John P. Dunn
1891	1890	J. S. Swan	L. C. Morehouse	Richard H. Beamer	James R. Hebbron	Edward P. Colgan
1892	1890	J. S. Swan	L. C. Morehouse	Richard H. Beamer	James R. Hebbron	Edward P. Colgan
1893	1890	J. S. Swan	L. C. Morehouse	Richard H. Beamer	James R. Hebbron	Edward P. Colgan
1894	1890	J. S. Swan	L. C. Morehouse	Richard H. Beamer	James R. Hebbron	Edward P. Colgan
1895	1894	A. Chesebrough	L. C. Morehouse	Richard H. Beamer	George L. Arnold	Edward P. Colgan
1896	1894	A. Chesebrough	L. C. Morehouse	Richard H. Beamer	George L. Arnold	Edward P. Colgan
1897	1894	A. Chesebrough	L. C. Morehouse	Richard H. Beamer	George L. Arnold	Edward P. Colgan
1898	1894	A. Chesebrough	L. C. Morehouse	Richard H. Beamer	George L. Arnold	Edward P. Colgan
1899	1898	J. G. Edwards	Alexander Brown	Richard H. Beamer	Thomas O. Toland	Edward P. Colgan
1900	1898	J. G. Edwards	Alexander Brown	Richard H. Beamer	Thomas O. Toland	Edward P. Colgan
1901	1898	J. G. Edwards	Alexander Brown	Richard H. Beamer	Thomas O. Toland	Edward P. Colgan
1902	1898	J. G. Edwards	Alexander Brown	Richard H. Beamer	Thomas O. Toland	Edward P. Colgan
1903	1902	William H. Alford	Alexander Brown	Richard H. Beamer	Frank Mattison	Edward P. Colgan
1904	1902	William H. Alford	Alexander Brown	Richard H. Beamer	Frank Mattison	Edward P. Colgan
1905	1902	William H. Alford	Alexander Brown	Richard H. Beamer	Frank Mattison	Edward P. Colgan
1906	1902	William H. Alford	Alexander Brown	Richard H. Beamer	Frank Mattison	A. B. Nye
1907	1906	Joseph H. Scott	Alexander Brown	Richard E. Collins	Jeff McElvaine	A. B. Nye
1908	1906	Joseph H. Scott	Alexander Brown	Richard E. Collins	Jeff McElvaine	A. B. Nye
1909	1906	Joseph H. Scott	Alexander Brown	Richard E. Collins	Jeff McElvaine	A. B. Nye
1910	1906	Joseph H. Scott	Alexander Brown	Richard E. Collins	Jeff McElvaine	A. B. Nye
1911	1910	Edward M. Rolkin	John Mitchell	Richard E. Collins	Jeff McElvaine	A. B. Nye
1912	1910	Edward M. Rolkin	John Mitchell	Richard E. Collins	Jeff McElvaine	A. B. Nye
1913	1910	Edward M. Rolkin	John Mitchell	Richard E. Collins	Jeff McElvaine	John S. Chambers
1914	1910	Edward M. Rolkin	John Mitchell	Richard E. Collins	Jeff McElvaine	John S. Chambers
1915	1914	John C. Corbett	John Mitchell	Richard E. Collins	Jeff McElvaine	John S. Chambers
1916	1914	John C. Corbett	John Mitchell	Richard E. Collins	Jeff McElvaine	John S. Chambers
1917	1914	John C. Corbett	John Mitchell	Richard E. Collins	Jeff McElvaine	John S. Chambers
1918	1914	John C. Corbett	John Mitchell	Richard E. Collins	Jeff McElvaine	John S. Chambers
1919	1918	John C. Corbett	John Mitchell	Richard E. Collins	Phillip D. Wilson	John S. Chambers
1920	1918	John C. Corbett	John Mitchell	Richard E. Collins	Phillip D. Wilson	John S. Chambers
1921	1918	John C. Corbett	John Mitchell	Richard E. Collins	Phillip D. Wilson	Ray L. Riley
1922	1918	John C. Corbett	John Mitchell	Richard E. Collins	Phillip D. Wilson	Ray L. Riley
1923	1922	John C. Corbett	John Mitchell	Richard E. Collins	Harvey G. Cattell	Ray L. Riley
1924	1922	John C. Corbett	John Mitchell	Richard E. Collins	Harvey G. Cattell	Ray L. Riley
1925	1922	John C. Corbett	John Mitchell	Richard E. Collins	Harvey G. Cattell	Ray L. Riley
1926	1922	John C. Corbett	John Mitchell	Richard E. Collins	Harvey G. Cattell	Ray L. Riley
1927	1926	John C. Corbett	Fred E. Stewart	Richard E. Collins	Harvey G. Cattell	Ray L. Riley
1928	1926	John C. Corbett	Fred E. Stewart	Richard E. Collins	Harvey G. Cattell	Ray L. Riley
1929	1926	John C. Corbett	Fred E. Stewart	Richard E. Collins	Harvey G. Cattell	Ray L. Riley
1930	1926	John C. Corbett	Fred E. Stewart	Richard E. Collins	Harvey G. Cattell	Ray L. Riley
1931	1930	John C. Corbett	Fred E. Stewart	Richard E. Collins	Harvey G. Cattell	Ray L. Riley
1932	1930	John C. Corbett	Fred E. Stewart	Richard E. Collins	Harvey G. Cattell	Ray L. Riley
1933	1930	John C. Corbett	Fred E. Stewart	Richard E. Collins	Harvey G. Cattell	Ray L. Riley
1934	1930	John C. Corbett	Fred E. Stewart	Richard E. Collins	Harvey G. Cattell	Ray L. Riley
1935	1934	John C. Corbett	Fred E. Stewart	Richard E. Collins	Orfa Jean Shontz	Ray L. Riley
1936	1934	John C. Corbett	Fred E. Stewart	Richard E. Collins	Orfa Jean Shontz	Ray L. Riley
1937	1934	John C. Corbett	Fred E. Stewart	Richard E. Collins	Orfa Jean Shontz	Harry B. Riley
1938	1934	John C. Corbett	Fred E. Stewart	Richard E. Collins	Orfa Jean Shontz	Harry B. Riley
1939	1938	George R. Reilly	Fred E. Stewart	Richard E. Collins	William G. Bonelli	Harry B. Riley
1940	1938	George R. Reilly	Fred E. Stewart	Richard E. Collins	William G. Bonelli	Harry B. Riley
1941	1938	George R. Reilly	Fred E. Stewart	Richard E. Collins	William G. Bonelli	Harry B. Riley
1942	1938	George R. Reilly	Fred E. Stewart	Richard E. Collins	William G. Bonelli	Harry B. Riley
1943	1942	George R. Reilly	James H. Quinn	Richard E. Collins	William G. Bonelli	Harry B. Riley
1944	1942	George R. Reilly	James H. Quinn	Richard E. Collins	William G. Bonelli	Harry B. Riley
1945	1942	George R. Reilly	James H. Quinn	Richard E. Collins	William G. Bonelli	Harry B. Riley
1946	1942	George R. Reilly	James H. Quinn	Richard E. Collins	William G. Bonelli	Thomas Kuchel
1947	1946	George R. Reilly	James H. Quinn	Jerrold L. Seawell	William G. Bonelli	Thomas Kuchel
1948	1946	George R. Reilly	James H. Quinn	Jerrold L. Seawell	William G. Bonelli	Thomas Kuchel
1949	1946	George R. Reilly	James H. Quinn	Jerrold L. Seawell	William G. Bonelli	Thomas Kuchel
1950	1946	George R. Reilly	James H. Quinn	Jerrold L. Seawell	William G. Bonelli	Thomas Kuchel
1951	1950	George R. Reilly	James H. Quinn	Jerrold L. Seawell	William G. Bonelli	Thomas Kuchel
1952	1950	George R. Reilly	James H. Quinn	Jerrold L. Seawell	William G. Bonelli	Thomas Kuchel
1953	1950	George R. Reilly	James H. Quinn	Jerrold L. Seawell	William G. Bonelli	Robert C. Kirkwood
1954	1950	George R. Reilly	James H. Quinn	Paul R. Leake	William G. Bonelli	Robert C. Kirkwood
1955	1954	George R. Reilly	James H. Quinn	Paul R. Leake	Robert E. McDavid	Robert C. Kirkwood
1956	1954	George R. Reilly	James H. Quinn	Paul R. Leake	Robert E. McDavid	Robert C. Kirkwood
1957	1954	George R. Reilly	James H. Quinn	Paul R. Leake	Robert E. McDavid	Robert C. Kirkwood
1958	1954	George R. Reilly	James H. Quinn	Paul R. Leake	Robert E. McDavid	Robert C. Kirkwood
1959	1958	George R. Reilly	John W. Lynch	Paul R. Leake	Richard Nevins	Alan Cranston
1960	1958	George R. Reilly	John W. Lynch	Paul R. Leake	Richard Nevins	Alan Cranston
1961	1958	George R. Reilly	John W. Lynch	Paul R. Leake	Richard Nevins	Alan Cranston
1962	1958	George R. Reilly	John W. Lynch	Paul R. Leake	Richard Nevins	Alan Cranston
1963	1962	George R. Reilly	John W. Lynch	Paul R. Leake	Richard Nevins	Alan Cranston
1964	1962	George R. Reilly	John W. Lynch	Paul R. Leake	Richard Nevins	Alan Cranston
1965	1962	George R. Reilly	John W. Lynch	Paul R. Leake	Richard Nevins	Alan Cranston
1966	1962	George R. Reilly	John W. Lynch	Paul R. Leake	Richard Nevins	Alan Cranston
1967	1966	George R. Reilly	John W. Lynch	Paul R. Leake	Richard Nevins	Houston I. Flournoy
1968	1966	George R. Reilly	John W. Lynch	Paul R. Leake	Richard Nevins	Houston I. Flournoy
1969	1966	George R. Reilly	John W. Lynch	Paul R. Leake	Richard Nevins	Houston I. Flournoy
1970	1966	George R. Reilly	John W. Lynch	Paul R. Leake	Richard Nevins	Houston I. Flournoy
1971	1970	George R. Reilly	John W. Lynch	William Morgan Bennett	Richard Nevins	Houston I. Flournoy
1972	1970	George R. Reilly	John W. Lynch	William Morgan Bennett	Richard Nevins	Houston I. Flournoy
1973	1970	George R. Reilly	John W. Lynch	William Morgan Bennett	Richard Nevins	Houston I. Flournoy
1974	1970	George R. Reilly	John W. Lynch	William Morgan Bennett	Richard Nevins	Houston I. Flournoy
1975	1974	George R. Reilly	John W. Lynch	William Morgan Bennett	Richard Nevins	Kenneth Cory
1976	1974	George R. Reilly	Iris G. Sankey (Note: Appointed by Governor Jerry Brown)	William Morgan Bennett	Richard Nevins	Kenneth Cory
1977	1974	George R. Reilly	Iris G. Sankey	William Morgan Bennett	Richard Nevins	Kenneth Cory
1978	1974	George R. Reilly	Iris G. Sankey	William Morgan Bennett	Richard Nevins	Kenneth Cory
1979	1978	George R. Reilly	Ernest J. Dronenburg Jr.	William Morgan Bennett	Richard Nevins	Kenneth Cory
1980	1978	George R. Reilly	Ernest J. Dronenburg Jr.	William Morgan Bennett	Richard Nevins	Kenneth Cory
1981	1978	George R. Reilly	Ernest J. Dronenburg Jr.	William Morgan Bennett	Richard Nevins	Kenneth Cory
1982	1978	George R. Reilly	Ernest J. Dronenburg Jr.	William Morgan Bennett	Richard Nevins	Kenneth Cory
1983	1982	Conway H. Collis	Ernest J. Dronenburg Jr.	William Morgan Bennett	Richard Nevins	Kenneth Cory
1984	1982	Conway H. Collis	Ernest J. Dronenburg Jr.	William Morgan Bennett	Richard Nevins	Kenneth Cory
1985	1982	Conway H. Collis	Ernest J. Dronenburg Jr.	William Morgan Bennett	Richard Nevins	Kenneth Cory
1986	1982	Conway H. Collis	Ernest J. Dronenburg Jr.	William Morgan Bennett	Richard Nevins	Kenneth Cory
1987	1986	William Morgan Bennett	Conway H. Collis	Ernest J. Dronenburg, Jr.	Paul B. Carpenter (Note: Carpenter won reelection in 1990 despite having been convicted of crimes earlier in the year as part of the BRISPEC sting operation. He was therefore not allowed to take the seat.)	Gray Davis
1988	1986	William Morgan Bennett	Conway H. Collis	Ernest J. Dronenburg, Jr.	Paul B. Carpenter	Gray Davis
1989	1986	William Morgan Bennett	Conway H. Collis	Ernest J. Dronenburg, Jr.	Paul B. Carpenter	Gray Davis
1990	1986	William Morgan Bennett	Conway H. Collis	Ernest J. Dronenburg, Jr.	Paul B. Carpenter	Gray Davis
1991	1990	William Morgan Bennett	Brad Sherman	Ernest J. Dronenburg, Jr.	Matt Fong (Note: Appointed by Governor Pete Wilson.)	Gray Davis
1992	1990	William Morgan Bennett	Brad Sherman	Ernest J. Dronenburg, Jr.	Matt Fong	Gray Davis
1993	1990	Vacant (Note: Governor Pete Wilson attempted to fill the vacancy with several appointees, but the California State Legislature rejected all his nominees.)	Brad Sherman	Ernest J. Dronenburg, Jr.	Matt Fong	Gray Davis
1994	1990	Vacant	Brad Sherman	Ernest J. Dronenburg, Jr.	Matt Fong	Gray Davis
1995	1994	Johan Klehs	Dean Andal	Ernest J. Dronenburg, Jr.	Brad Sherman	Kathleen Connell
1996	1994	Johan Klehs	Dean Andal	Ernest J. Dronenburg, Jr.	Brad Sherman	Kathleen Connell
1997	1994	Johan Klehs	Dean Andal	Ernest J. Dronenburg, Jr.	John Chiang (Note: In accordance with California Government Code § 1775, assumed the position of acting board member as the chief deputy of the predecessor when the predecessor resigned the office.)	Kathleen Connell
1998	1994	Johan Klehs	Dean Andal	Ernest J. Dronenburg, Jr.	John Chiang	Kathleen Connell
1999	1998	Johan Klehs	Dean Andal	Claude Parrish	John Chiang	Kathleen Connell
2000	1998	Johan Klehs	Dean Andal	Claude Parrish	John Chiang	Kathleen Connell
2001	1998	Johan Klehs	Dean Andal	Claude Parrish	John Chiang	Kathleen Connell
2002	1998	Johan Klehs	Dean Andal	Claude Parrish	John Chiang	Kathleen Connell
2003	2002	Carole Migden	Bill Leonard	Claude Parrish	John Chiang	Steve Westly
2004	2002	Carole Migden	Bill Leonard	Claude Parrish	John Chiang	Steve Westly
2005	2002	Betty Yee	Bill Leonard	Claude Parrish	John Chiang	Steve Westly
2006	2002	Betty Yee	Bill Leonard	Claude Parrish	John Chiang	Steve Westly
2007	2006	Betty Yee	Bill Leonard	Michelle Steel	Judy Chu	John Chiang
2008	2006	Betty Yee	Bill Leonard	Michelle Steel	Judy Chu	John Chiang
2009	2006	Betty Yee	Bill Leonard	Michelle Steel	Judy Chu	John Chiang
2010	2006	Betty Yee	Barbara Alby / Sean Wallentine (Note: Served for only 3 days, which set a record for shortest tenure on the board. Upon the end of his term, he became chief deputy of the incoming board member.))	Michelle Steel	Steve Shea / Jerome Horton (Note: Appointed by Governor Arnold Schwarzenegger as the permanent replacement to complete Judy Chu's unexpired term. Horton ran against Chu in 2006 and lost.)	John Chiang
2011	2010	Betty Yee	George Runner	Michelle Steel	Jerome Horton	John Chiang
2012	2010	Betty Yee	George Runner	Michelle Steel	Jerome Horton	John Chiang
2013	2010	Betty Yee	George Runner	Michelle Steel	Jerome Horton	John Chiang
2014	2010	Betty Yee	George Runner	Michelle Steel	Jerome Horton	John Chiang
2015	2014	George Runner	Fiona Ma	Jerome Horton	Diane Harkey	Betty Yee
2016	2014	George Runner	Fiona Ma	Jerome Horton	Diane Harkey	Betty Yee
2017	2014	George Runner	Fiona Ma	Jerome Horton	Diane Harkey	Betty Yee
2018	2014	George Runner	Fiona Ma	Jerome Horton	Diane Harkey	Betty Yee
2019	2018	Ted Gaines	Malia Cohen	Tony Vazquez	Mike Schaefer	Betty Yee
2020	2018	Ted Gaines	Malia Cohen	Tony Vazquez	Mike Schaefer	Betty Yee
2021	2018	Ted Gaines	Malia Cohen	Tony Vazquez	Mike Schaefer	Betty Yee
2022	2018	Ted Gaines	Malia Cohen	Tony Vazquez	Mike Schaefer	Betty Yee
2023	2022	Ted Gaines	Sally Lieber	Tony Vazquez	Mike Schaefer	Malia Cohen
2024	2022	Ted Gaines	Sally Lieber	Tony Vazquez	Mike Schaefer	Malia Cohen
2025	2022	Ted Gaines	Sally Lieber	Tony Vazquez	Mike Schaefer	Malia Cohen
2026	2022	Ted Gaines	Sally Lieber	Tony Vazquez	Mike Schaefer	Malia Cohen
2027	2026	Nelson Esparza	Sally Lieber	Mike Gipson	Tom Umberg	Malia Cohen

== Programs ==
After being reduced to its constitutional responsibilities in 2017, the Board retained almost none of its tax and fee responsibilities. The only property taxes it actively administers in its entirety are state-assessed properties and the Private Railroad Car Tax; the Board acts only in an appellate role in collecting the Alcoholic Beverage Tax and Insurance Tax, reviewing appeals of denials of claims for refund.

However, the Board does continue to appraise and audit public utilities, railroad companies and properties owned by counties outside of their own jurisdictions, known as 'state-assessed properties', and hear appeals from its own staff appraisals.

=== Tax administration programs ===
- State-assessed properties
- Private Railroad Car Tax

=== Regulatory programs ===
- County-assessed properties

=== Appellate-only programs ===
- Alcoholic Beverage Tax
- Tax on Insurers

Former responsibilities (prior to 2017)

=== Sales and use tax programs ===
- Sales and Use Tax
- Bradley-Burns Uniform Local Sales and Use Tax
- District Transactions (Sales) and Use Tax

=== Special tax and fee programs ===
- Electronic Waste Recycling Fee
- Environmental Fees
  - Hazardous Substances Tax
  - Marine Invasive Species Fee (formerly Ballast Water Management Fee)
  - Occupational Lead Poisoning Prevention Fee
- Excise Taxes
  - Alcoholic Beverages Tax
  - Alternative Cigarette Tax Stamp Program (ACTS)
  - California Tire Fee
  - Cigarette and Tobacco Products Tax
  - Cigarette and Tobacco Products Licensing Program
  - Emergency Telephone Users Surcharge
  - Energy Resources Surcharge
  - Insurance Tax
  - Integrated Waste Management Fee
  - Natural Gas Surcharge
- Fuel Taxes
  - Aircraft Jet Fuel Tax
  - Childhood Lead Poisoning Prevention Fee
  - Diesel Fuel Tax
  - International Fuel Tax Agreement (IFTA)
  - Interstate User Diesel Fuel Tax
  - Motor Vehicle Fuel Tax
  - Oil Spill Response, Prevention, and Administration Fees
  - Underground Storage Tank Maintenance Fee
  - Use Fuel Tax

=== Property Tax Programs ===
- County-assessed droperties
- Private Railroad Car Tax
- State-assessed properties
- Timber Yield Tax

=== Tax Appellate Programs ===
- Bank and Corporation Tax Law
- Personal Income Tax
- Homeowner and Renter Property Tax Assistance Law
- Publicly Owned Property Assessment Review Program
- Taxpayers' Bill of Rights Law

== See also ==
- Districts in California
