= Sally Lieber =

Member of the California State Board of Equalization (born 1961)

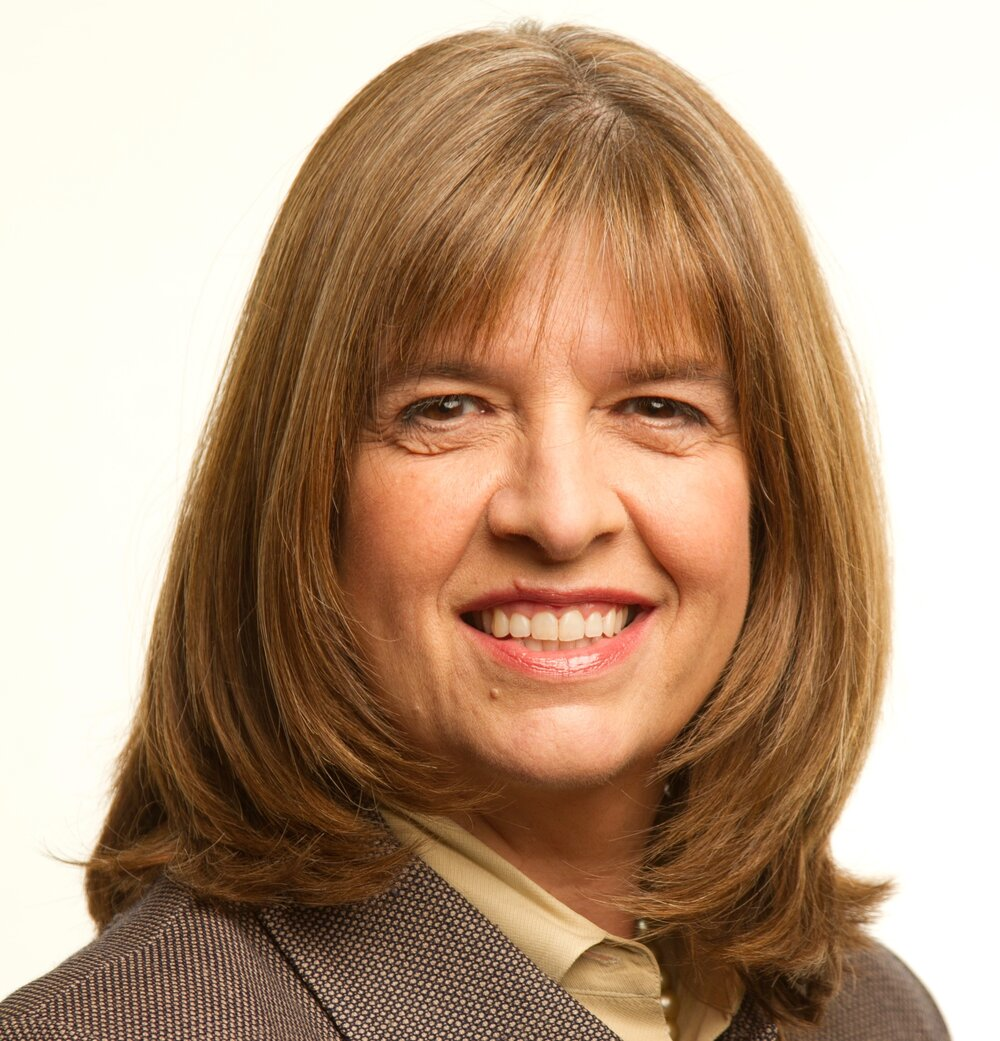
- Official portrait, 2022

Member of the California State Board of Equalization from the 2nd district
- Incumbent
- Assumed office January 2, 2023
- Preceded by: Malia Cohen

Speaker pro tempore of the California State Assembly
- In office October 24, 2006 – November 30, 2008
- Preceded by: Leland Yee
- Succeeded by: Lori Saldaña

Member of the California State Assembly from the 22nd district
- In office December 2, 2002 – November 30, 2008
- Preceded by: Elaine Alquist
- Succeeded by: Paul Fong

Personal details
- Born: April 24, 1961 (age 65) Detroit, Michigan, U.S.
- Party: Democratic
- Spouse: David Phillips
- Education: City College of San Francisco (attended); Foothill College (attended); Stanford University (BA)
- Website: Official website

Sally J. Lieber (born April 24, 1961) is an American politician from the state of California who has served as a member of the California State Board of Equalization since 2023. She was elected by her colleagues to serve as Chair for 2024 and 2026. She was previously a member of the Mountain View City Council and the California State Assembly. She represented the 22nd Assembly District that includes the cities of Mountain View, Sunnyvale, Cupertino and portions of Santa Clara and San Jose which are all located in Santa Clara County. In February 2022, Assemblywoman Lieber was endorsed by the California State Democratic Party for Board Member of the California State Board of Equalization, District 2. She won the seat in the California general election held on November 8, 2022.

Lieber held the office of Speaker pro Tempore in the 2007-2008 legislative session. In the November 7, 2006 general election she was re-elected to her third and final term in the assembly, beating her Republican opponent Roger Riffenburgh by 68.8% to 31.2%. In 2008, she was term-limited out of the office.

Lieber currently serves as an advisor to the San Francisco Bay Restoration Authority, an agency that was created through her legislation, and served on Attorney General Kamala Harris's transition team working on women's rehabilitation and mental health.

== Early life and education ==
Lieber was born in Detroit, Michigan on April 24, 1961. As a youth growing up in the 1960s and 1970s, she was interested in the antiwar and civil rights movements.

After graduating from high school, Lieber worked restoring Victorian houses and specialized in hanging historical wallpapers. She spent 10 years at this job. As she hung wallpaper, Lieber's interest in politics grew as she listened to NPR and this encouraged Lieber to return to school.

In her late 20s, she began taking night classes at San Francisco City College. In 1992, she met her husband David Phillips. The two ran into each other at Burning Man, an arts festival held every year in the Nevada desert.

After they married in 1993, Lieber moved to the peninsula and transferred to Foothill College, where she started going to school full-time and became involved in student government. She worked on issues of child care for student parents, campus access for the disabled and student health care. In the mid-1990s, Lieber transferred to Stanford University with a political science major, working with Luis Fraga.

== Early political career ==
The 37-year-old Lieber, still a senior at Stanford, launched her campaign for Mountain View city government in 1998. Lieber won this election, as the top vote-getter of seven candidates, and served as Vice Mayor and Mayor. She also served as the City's representative on the Valley Transportation Authority's Board of Directors and as Chair of the Santa Clara Valley Water District's Water Commission.

Lieber ran for the 22nd Assembly District seat in 2002. She ran against Santa Clara City Councilperson Rod Diridon Jr., who was endorsed by most party heavyweights, and fellow Mountain View City Councilperson Rosemary Stasek. She surprised political spectators when she won the Democratic primary with 44 percent of the vote. Her volunteers walked to 58,000 households during the campaign. Lieber won the general election against Republican Sunnyvale Mayor Stan Kawczynski.

Lieber announced in December 2006 that she would be running for the Santa Clara County Board of Supervisors, District 5 in the 2008 election against Liz Kniss. She later withdrew from that race.

Lieber was also a 2012 candidate for California's newly drawn 13th State Senate District, which includes northern Santa Clara County and much of San Mateo County, but lost to San Mateo County Supervisor Jerry Hill on November 6, 2012.

== State Assembly ==
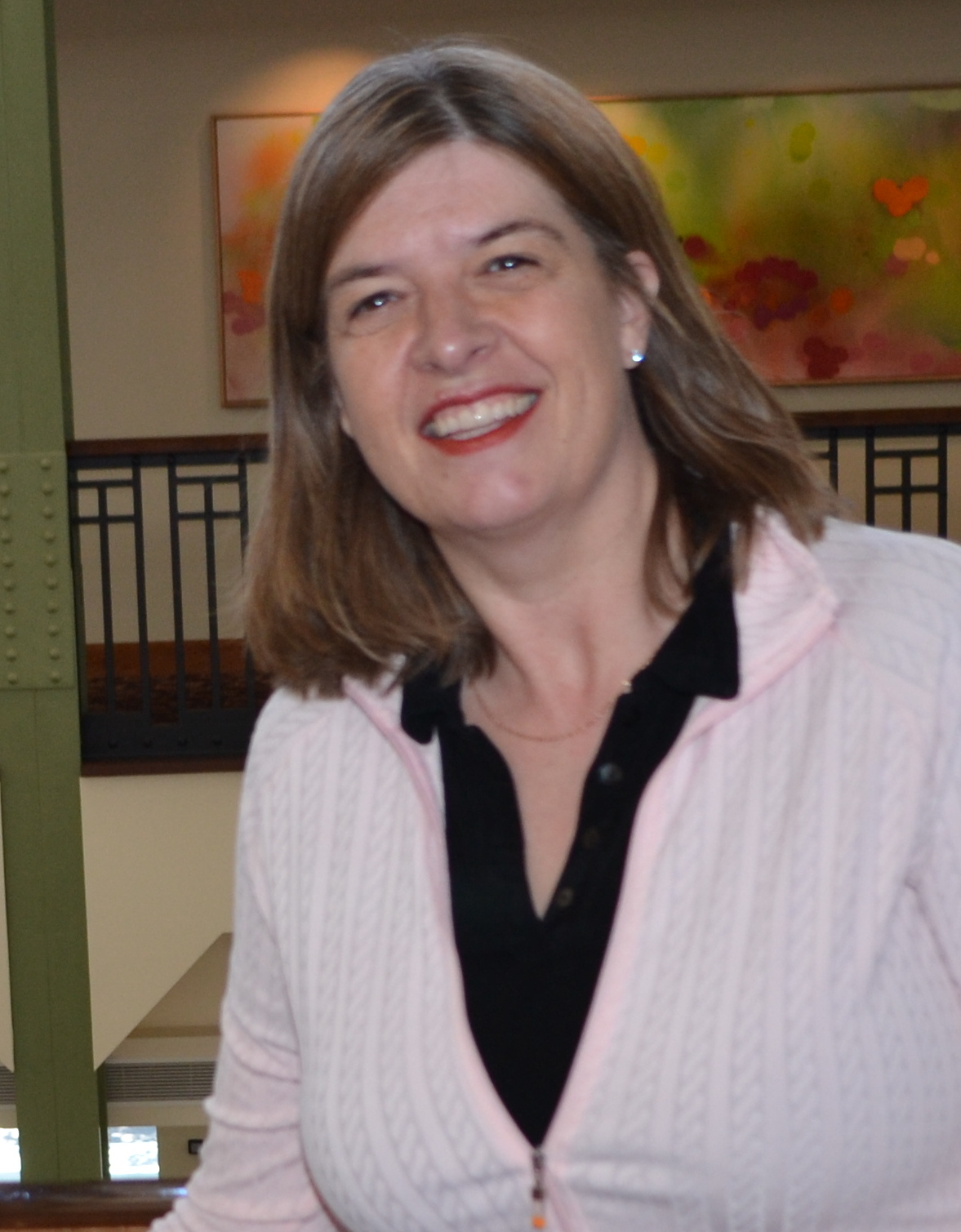
Lieber in 2011

=== Leadership positions and committees ===
During her first term she served as Assistant Speaker pro Tempore. During this term she was the only woman to serve as an officer of the Assembly. She took the oath of office for Speaker pro Tempore on October 24, 2006, becoming the third woman to serve in this role since 1849. She also served on the Assembly's Committee on Insurance, Committee on Judiciary, Committee on Local Government, Committee on Health and as the Chair of the Assembly's Select Committee on Mobilehomes. She previously served as the Assembly Chair of the legislature's Joint Committee on Ending Poverty in California.

=== Legislative priorities and accomplishments ===
Sally Lieber's main legislative priorities include: increased educational and economic opportunities for all citizens of California, protection for the environment, improvements to public health, and increased social justice.

Lieber authored legislation to increase the state's minimum wage, co-authored a greenhouse gas reduction bill, and joint-author of a bill to legalize gay marriage (though that bill was later vetoed by Gov. Arnold Schwarzenegger). Lieber was one of only a few heterosexual legislators to joint-author Mark Leno's marriage equality bill. She has authored legislation that includes efforts increasing pupil immunizations, creating an independent sentencing commission, and improving the living conditions of inmates in California's overcrowded prisons.

Lieber has authored legislation providing for a death penalty moratorium, advocating for the rights of pregnant inmates in state prison (allowing them to have prenatal vitamins, providing larger clothes as they got larger with pregnancy, anti-shackling during childbirth), fighting for victims of human trafficking and battling toxic-dumping corporations. Most recently, she advocated a mandatory vaccine against HPV, the virus that causes cervical cancer.

=== Simulated homelessness experience ===
In April 2006, Lieber spent several days living as if she were homeless in Santa Clara Valley, in an attempt to understand the problems the homeless face, and how the legislature can help them. She begged for money, and collected cans and bottles, in order to buy food on the streets of Mountain View and San Jose. Lieber used the experience to encourage the Governor to keep cold weather shelters open for the homeless.

=== Vehicle emissions testing ===
In 2004, Lieber introduced extremely controversial legislation regarding the State vehicle Emission test cycle, which was signed into law by Governor Arnold Schwarzenegger. The bi-ennial test previously exempted vehicles over 30 years old, while Lieber's legislation fixed the cutoff date at 1976 in perpetuity. Historical vehicles are not exempt. Car collectors, including Jay Leno, noted that this legislation imposed severe penalties for negligible benefit.

=== Anti-spanking bill ===
Lieber was in the press in January 2007 by announcing she was planning on introducing a bill that will make it illegal in California to spank a child three years old or younger. She may have been inspired by the law in Canada which prohibits spanking children under the age of 2 years or over the age of 11 years, which was passed in 2004. The proposed bill has since been opposed by some on the basis of the practical aspects of enforcing it, though there are those who support it as well (early polling suggests that it is supported by 23% of Californians).

=== Political leanings ===
Lieber has been rated at 100% by the Sierra Club California, the California National Organization for Women, California League of Conservation Voters, California School Employees Association, the California Alliance for Retired Americans, and the California Labor Federation (AFL-CIO). She has received low ratings from the Howard Jarvis Taxpayers Association and the California Chamber of Commerce.

== California State Board of Equalization ==
Lieber ran for the California State Board of Equalization in the 2022 election. On June 7, 2022, Lieber became the Democratic Party's nominee going into the November general election run-off, which she won.

== Santa Clara County Board of Supervisors Race ==
In April 2023, Lieber announced her intention to run for the Santa Clara County Board of Supervisors District 5 seat, an open seat being vacated by term-limited Joe Simitian. Lieber lost the general election to Mountain View councilmember Margaret Abe-Koga.

Political offices
Preceded by Leland Yee	Speaker pro tempore of the California Assembly; 2006–2008	Succeeded by Lori Saldaña
