= Jerome Horton =

American politician (born 1956)

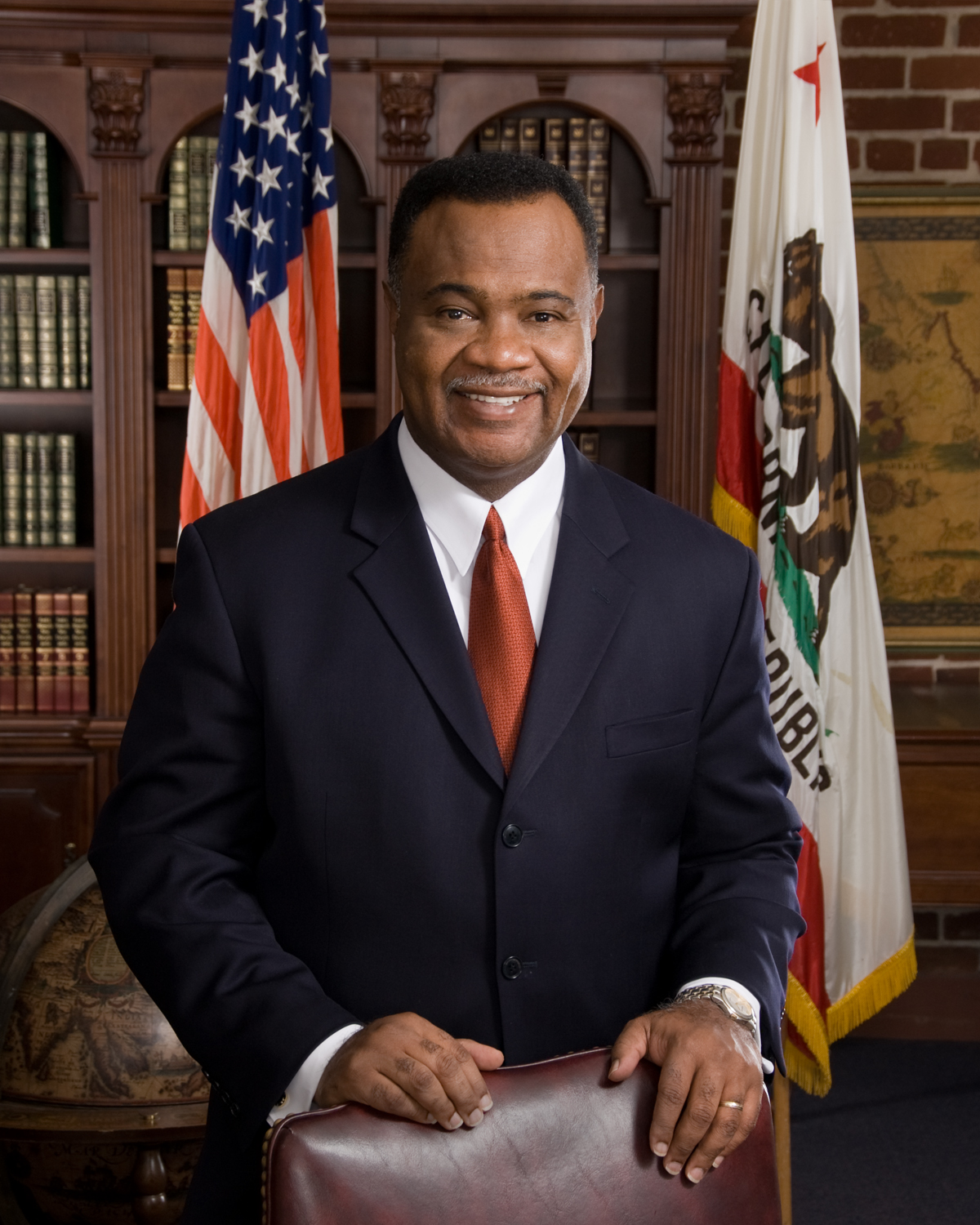
- Official portrait, 2009

Member of the California State Board of Equalization
- In office October 5, 2009 – January 7, 2019
- Preceded by: Judy Chu
- Succeeded by: Tony Vazquez
- Constituency: 4th district (2009–2015); 3rd district (2015–2019)

Member of the California State Assembly from the 51st district
- In office December 4, 2000 – November 30, 2006
- Preceded by: Edward Vincent Jr.
- Succeeded by: Curren Price

Personal details
- Born: Jerome Edgar Horton; September 14, 1956 (age 70) Pine Bluff, Arkansas, U.S.
- Party: Democratic
- Spouse: Yvonne Horton
- Children: 3
- Education: California State University, Dominguez Hills
- Profession: Accountant

Jerome Edgar Horton (born September 14, 1956) is an American accountant and politician who was a member of the California Board of Equalization from the 3rd district from October 5, 2009 to January 7, 2019. He previously served as a member of the California State Assembly from 2000 until 2006.

== Career ==
On July 15, 2009, Governor Arnold Schwarzenegger nominated Horton for the 3rd district of the California Board of Equalization to replace Judy Chu, who resigned from the board to become a member of the United States House of Representatives. Horton was confirmed by both houses of the legislature and sworn into office on October 5, 2009, at which point he was immediately elected the board's vice chair. On November 2, 2010, he was elected to his own four-year term. Horton served as chair of the board from 2011 to 2016.

On November 9, 2020, Horton announced his candidacy for the 2022 U.S. Senate election in California.

=== Allegations of improper activity ===
An audit by the California Department of Finance of Horton's tenure as board chairman revealed missing funds and signs of nepotism, leading to calls for the governor to put the board under a public trustee. In June 2017, the California Department of Justice began a criminal investigation into the members of the board leading to Governor Jerry Brown stripping the board of most of its powers.

== Electoral history ==
=== 2010 ===
2010 California State Board of Equalization, 4th district
Party	Candidate	Votes	%
Democratic	Jerome Horton (incumbent)	1,223,906	71.8%
American Independent	Shawn Hoffman	215,639	12.6%
Libertarian	Peter "Pedro" De Baets	198,575	11.6%
Peace and Freedom	Nancy Lawrence	68,577	4.0%
Majority		1,008,267	59.2%
Democratic hold

=== 2006 ===
2006 California State Board of Equalization, 4th district Democratic primary
Party	Candidate	Votes	%
Democratic	Judy Chu	243,428	49.7%
Democratic	Jerome Horton	154,536	31.5%
Democratic	Rita Rogers	60,621	12.3%
Democratic	Vonny T. Abbott	32,020	6.5%
Majority		88,892	18.2%

=== 2004 ===
2004 California State Assembly elections, 2004
Party	Candidate	Votes	%
Democratic	Jerome Horton (incumbent)	89,509	84.1%
Libertarian	Daniel R. Sherman	16,941	15.9%
Majority		72,568	68.2%
Democratic hold

=== 2002 ===
2002 California State Assembly elections, 2002
Party	Candidate	Votes	%
Democratic	Jerome Horton (incumbent)	49,718	100.0%
Majority		N/A	—
Democratic hold

California Assembly
Preceded by Edward Vincent Jr.	Member of the California State Assembly from the 51st district 2000-2006	Succeeded by Curren Price
Political offices
Preceded by Judy Chu	Member of the California State Board of Equalization from the 4th district 2009–2015	Succeeded by Diane Harkey
Preceded by Michelle Steel	Member of the California State Board of Equalization from the 3rd district 2015–2019	Succeeded by Tony Vazquez
