= Mike Schaefer =

American politician (born 1938)

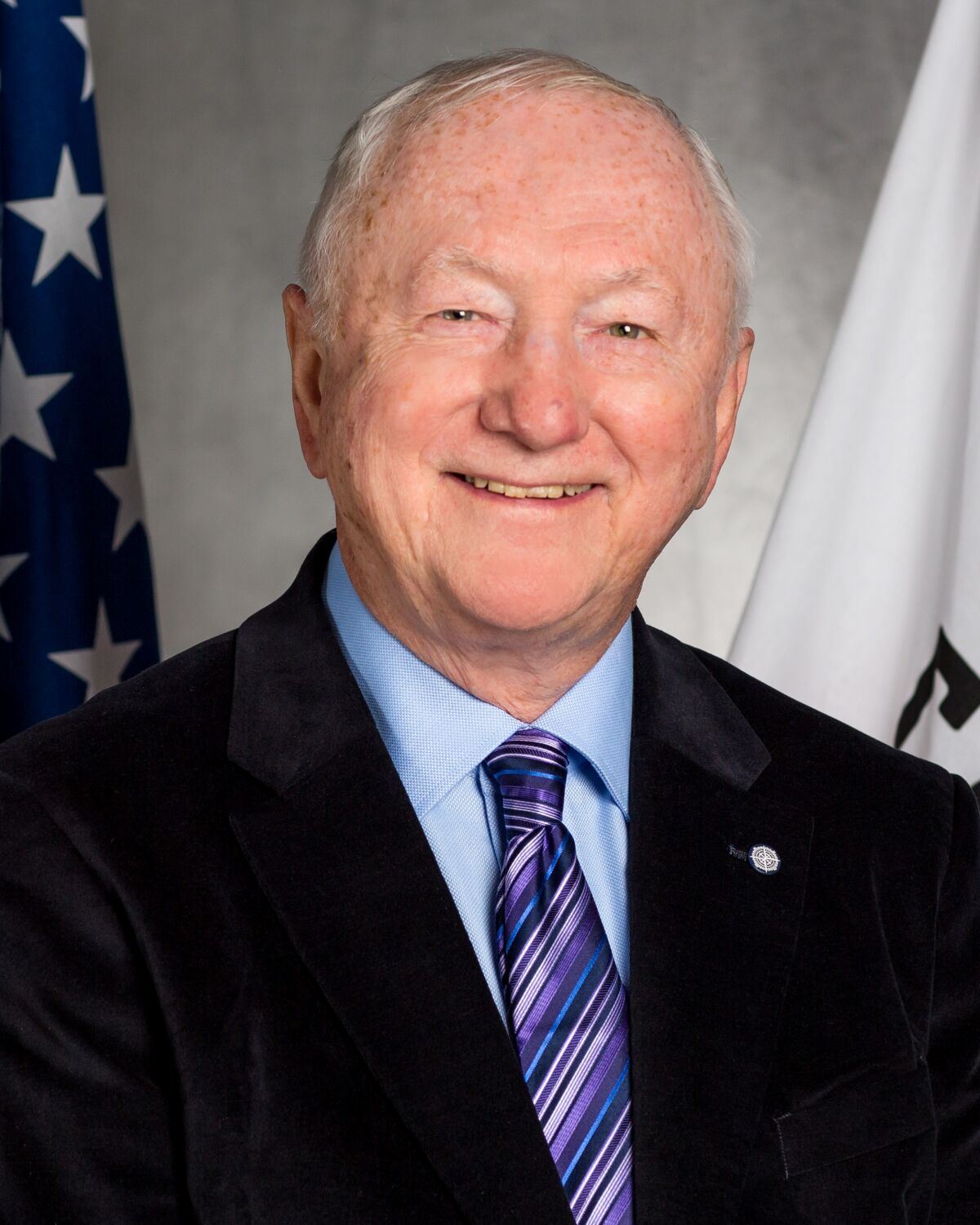
- Official portrait, 2019

Member of the California State Board of Equalization from the 4th district
- Incumbent
- Assumed office January 7, 2019
- Preceded by: Diane Harkey

Member of the San Diego City Council from the 8th District
- In office 1965–1971

Personal details
- Born: John Michael Schaefer; March 25, 1938 (age 88) San Diego, California, U.S.
- Party: Republican (before 2004); Democratic (2004–present)
- Children: 2
- Education: University of California, Berkeley (BA); Georgetown University (JD)

John Michael Schaefer (born March 25, 1938) is an American politician, lawyer, and perennial candidate who served on the San Diego City Council from 1965 to 1971 and then ran for 33 local and state offices in California, Arizona, Maryland, and Nevada for nearly half a century before unexpectedly winning election to the California Board of Equalization in 2018. Schaefer is the oldest Californian to serve in a state constitutional office. Initially a Republican, Schaefer became a Democrat in 2004.

== Early life and education ==
John Michael Schaefer was born in San Diego, California, on March 25, 1938. He graduated from Mission Bay High School in 1956, and earned a Bachelor of Business from the University of California, Berkeley and a Juris Doctor from the Georgetown University Law Center.

== Career ==
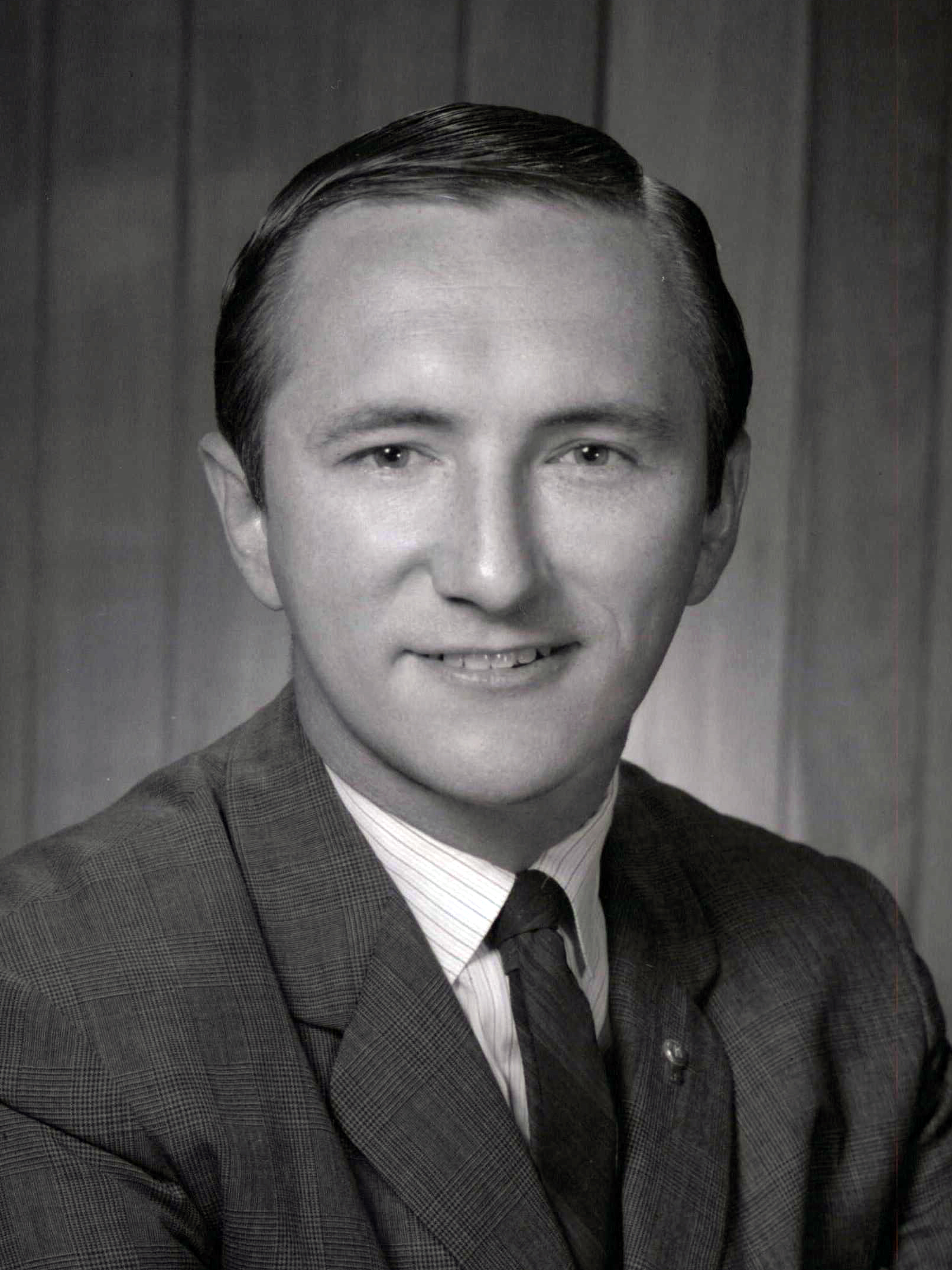
Schaefer in 1965 as a member of the San Diego City Council

During the 1960 presidential election, he supported U.S. Senator John F. Kennedy, a Democrat, and later served as a staff assistant for Senator Thomas Kuchel, a Republican. He also worked as an analyst for the U.S. Securities and Exchange Commission.

In 1965, Schaefer was elected to the San Diego City Council and served until 1971. In 1968, he received the Republican nomination in California's 37th House district, but was defeated by incumbent Representative Lionel Van Deerlin. In 1971, he ran for mayor in the open primary, but received less than one percent of the vote. In 1974, he ran for the Republican nomination for Secretary of State in Nevada, but was defeated by Stanley W. Paher.

In the 1980s, he moved to Maryland where he befriended William Donald Schaefer, who served as the mayor of Baltimore and Governor of Maryland, and Mike Schaefer believed that sharing a last name with him would help him politically, and following Schaefer's death in 2011 Mike filed a $28,000 claim to William's estate. In 1986, he ran for the Republican nomination in Maryland's U.S. Senate election, but was defeated by Linda Chavez. He became a Democrat in 2004, and in 2006 again ran in Maryland's U.S. Senate election. He finished fifth out of 18 candidates in the Democratic primary, which was won by Ben Cardin.

From the 1990s to the 2010s, he ran for local offices in Los Angeles and San Francisco, Secretary of State of California, state legislative seats in Arizona, Nevada, and Maryland, and mayor in Baltimore and Palm Springs. In 2014, he was removed from the Nevada state controller primary and the decision was upheld by the Nevada Supreme Court as he had failed to meet the residency requirements.

In 2018, he initially sought to run for California's 54th State Assembly district, but later dropped out as he would rather remain in San Diego and ran in the Board of Equalization's 4th district. He ran as a member of the Democratic Party and placed second in the top-two primary behind Republican state senator Joel Anderson. On November 6, 2018, Schaefer unexpectedly defeated Anderson by a narrow margin; Anderson had spent over $300,000 to Schaefer's $25,000. This was attributed to the Democratic wave and Anderson being reprimanded for his comments to a female lobbyist. Schaefer was re-elected to the Board in 2022, defeating fellow Democrat David Dodson.

Schaefer was briefly a Democratic candidate for California's 47th congressional district in the 2024 election, but later switched to the race for the U.S. Senate in Nevada. He lost the primary election to the incumbent Senator Jacky Rosen.

Schaefer formed a campaign committee to run for Lieutenant Governor of California in 2026, but later switched to the race for California’s 48th congressional district.

Asked why he regularly runs for office, Schaefer said that he loves to do so.

=== Legal issues ===
In 1970, Schaefer was arrested for bribery and conspiracy in the 1970 Yellow Cab bribery scandal, but was later acquitted after an eleven-hour deliberation by a jury on January 21, 1971.

Schaefer bought properties in multiple states, including the Schaefer Hotel which he bought for $450,000. He was successfully sued by his tenants in Los Angeles for the low quality of his housing and they were awarded $1.83 million.

In 1993, Schaefer was convicted of misdemeanor spousal abuse and was disbarred by the Nevada Supreme Court in 2001. In 2015, he was ordered to pay $328 to his live-in landlord.

In 2013, comedian Brad Garrett filed a restraining order against Schaefer, stating in his application: "As a celebrity, I am very concerned about stalkers who seek notoriety by associating themselves with me." Under the order, Schaefer is also banned from the MGM Grand Las Vegas.

In 2025, tech entrepreneur Palmer Luckey revealed that Schaefer had sent him numerous angry letters and had stated that he would not treat Luckey fairly on tax matters because Luckey had not invited him to a political fundraiser hosted in 2024. The chief counsel and executive director of the Board of Equalization said they would look into the matter. Schaefer also said he would exclude himself from participating in any matters related to Luckey or his interests, citing a threat of a lawsuit from Luckey, which Luckey denies making.

== Electoral history ==
Electoral history of Kevin Kiley
Year	Office	Party	Primary			General			Result	Swing	Ref.
Year	Office	Party	Total	%	P.	Total	%	P.	Result	Swing	Ref.
1965	San Diego City Council (8th)	Nonpartisan	1,993	16.68%	1st	72,836	58.21%	1st	Won	N/A	
1967	San Diego City Council (8th)	Nonpartisan	7,411	63.32%	1st	102,899	76.96%	1st	Won	N/A	
1968	U.S. House (CA 37th)	Republican	29,813	75.45%	1st	52,547	35.34%	2nd	Lost	Hold	
1974	Nevada Secretary of State	Republican	11,376	36.32%	2nd	Did not advance			Lost	Hold	
1984	San Diego City Attorney	Nonpartisan	60,585	32.48%	2nd	Did not advance			Lost	N/A	
1986	U.S. Senate (MD)	Republican	16,902	12.24%	2nd	Did not advance			Lost	Gain	
1990	San Diego County Board of Supervisors (4th)	Nonpartisan	15,562	23.99%	2nd	Did not advance			Lost	N/A	
1990	LA City Council	Nonpartisan	127	1.03%	8th	Did not advance			Lost	N/A	
1990	California State Assembly	Republican	3,200	6.05%	4th	Did not advance			Lost	Gain	
1994	San Diego County District Attorney	Nonpartisan	43,134	10.47%	5th	Did not advance			Lost	N/A	
1996	U.S. House (NV 2)	Republican	1,188	1.51%	6th	Did not advance			Lost	Gain	
1999	S.F. District Attorney	Nonpartisan	5,468	3.13%	5th	Did not advance			Lost	N/A	
2001	U.S. House (CA)	Republican	2,315	2.58%	9th	Did not advance			Lost	Hold	
2001	LA City Council	Nonpartisan	258	1.20%	9th	Did not advance			Lost	N/A	
2002	CA Secretary of State	Republican	409,215	20.68%	2nd	Did not advance			Lost	Gain	
2002	Clark County, Nevada Public Administrator	Republican	11,565	21.49%	2nd	Did not advance			Lost	Hold	
2002	U.S. House (AZ)	Republican	933	1.75%	6th	Did not advance			Lost	Gain	
2004	Nevada Senate (1st)	Democratic	922	18.98%	3rd	Did not advance			Lost	Gain	
2006	U.S. Senate (MD)	Democratic	7,770	1.32%	5th	Did not advance			Lost	Hold	
2007	Mayor of Baltimore	Democratic	762	0.89%	6th	Did not advance			Lost	Hold	
2010	Baltimore City Sheriff	Democratic	4,398	7.73%	4th	Did not advance			Lost	Hold	
2012	Nevada Assembly (16th)	Democratic	286	23.68%	2nd	Did not advance			Lost	Hold	
2013	LA City Council	Nonpartisan	359	1.87%	11th	Did not advance			Lost	N/A	
2015	LA City Council	Nonpartisan	268	1.10%	12th	Did not advance			Lost	N/A	
2015	Mayor of Palm Springs	Nonpartisan	124	1.08%	8th	Did not advance			Lost	N/A	
2016	U.S. House (NV 4th)	Democratic	773	2.53%	6th	Did not advance			Lost	Gain	
2017	LA City Council	Nonpartisan	266	1.22%	13th	Did not advance			Lost	N/A	
2018	CA Board of Equalization	Democratic	269,044	17.04%	2nd	1,559,373	52.21%	1st	Won	Gain	
2022	CA Board of Equalization	Democratic	597,948	35.90%	1st	1,241,062	58.85%	1st	Won	Hold	
2024	U.S. Senate (NV)	Democratic	3,521	2.24%	4th	Did not advance			Lost	Hold	
2026	U.S. House (CA 48th)	Democratic	4,770	2.52%	8th	Did not advance			Lost	Gain	
