= Tony Vazquez =

American politician and educator from California

- Official portrait, 2019

Member of the California State Board of Equalization from the 3rd district
- Incumbent
- Assumed office January 12, 2019
- Preceded by: Jerome Horton

Personal details
- Born: Antonio Vazquez; November 19, 1955 (age 70) California, U.S.
- Party: Democratic
- Education: University of Southern California (BA)

Antonio Vazquez (born November 19, 1955) is an American politician and former educator serving as a member of the California Board of Equalization from the third district. Elected in 2018, he assumed office on January 12, 2019.

Vazquez graduated from the University of Southern California. He worked as a teacher and served as the mayor of Santa Monica, California from 2015 to 2016.
