= Malia Cohen =

American politician (born 1977)

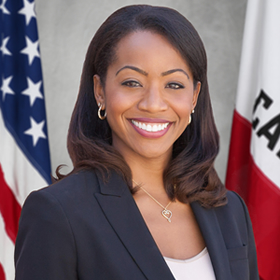
- Official portrait, 2023

33rd Controller of California
- Incumbent
- Assumed office January 2, 2023
- Governor: Gavin Newsom; Xavier Becerra (elect)
- Preceded by: Betty Yee

Member of the California State Board of Equalization from the 2nd district
- In office January 7, 2019 – January 2, 2023
- Preceded by: Fiona Ma
- Succeeded by: Sally Lieber

President of the San Francisco Board of Supervisors
- In office June 26, 2018 – January 7, 2019
- Preceded by: London Breed
- Succeeded by: Norman Yee

Member of the San Francisco Board of Supervisors from the 10th district
- In office January 8, 2011 – January 7, 2019
- Preceded by: Sophie Maxwell
- Succeeded by: Shamann Walton

Personal details
- Born: December 16, 1977 (age 48) San Francisco, California, U.S.
- Party: Democratic
- Spouse: Warren Pulley (m. 2016)
- Education: Fisk University (BA); Carnegie Mellon University (MA)

Malia M. Cohen (born December 16, 1977) is an American politician serving as the 33rd controller of California since 2023. A member of the Democratic Party, Cohen previously served as chair of the California State Board of Equalization from the 2nd district from 2019 to 2023 and as president of the San Francisco Board of Supervisors from District 10 from 2011 to 2019.

== Early life and education ==
Cohen was born in San Francisco on December 16, 1977. The eldest of five girls, she grew up in the Richmond District in San Francisco and graduated from Lowell High School. Her mother, Mary Cohen, was a social worker and her father, Evered Cohen, a telecommunication worker who later became an ordained minister.

Cohen earned a bachelor's degree in political science from Fisk University and a graduate degree in political science from Carnegie Mellon University.

== Career ==
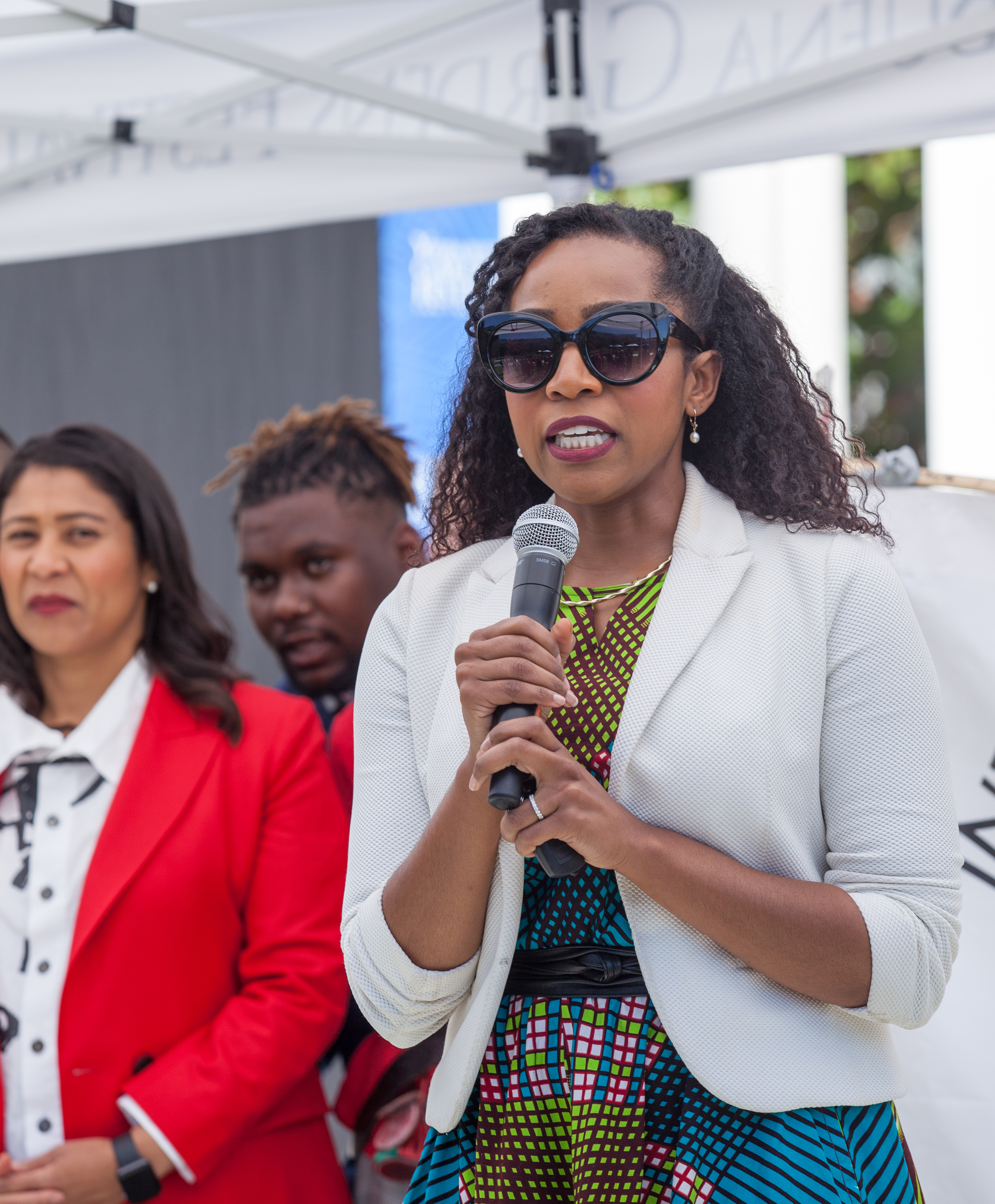
Malia Cohen in 2018 at an Indigenous Peoples' Day ceremony

Cohen worked as a field organizer for Gavin Newsom in the 2003 San Francisco mayoral election and as his confidential secretary for two years when he was mayor. After leaving Newsom's office, Cohen worked as a legislative aide for San Mateo County supervisor Rose Jacobs Gibson.

=== San Francisco Board of Supervisors ===
In the 2010 election for District 10 of the San Francisco Board of Supervisors, she was third in receiving first place votes out of a field of 22, but eventually won the election based on ranked choice voting.

In October 2013, Cohen introduced legislation that expanded an existing San Francisco law making it illegal to sell firearms with magazines capable of holding more than 10 rounds. The gun-control legislation passed unanimously.

In 2013, Cohen and Jane Kim authored the Fair Chance ordinance, a "ban the box" legislation barring employers and landlords from asking applicants to state their criminal history on applications, which passed the Board of Supervisors unanimously.

In 2014, Cohen was re-elected for a second term to represent District 10 after being challenged by Marlene Tran and Tony Kelly.

=== California State Board of Equalization ===
Cohen succeeded London Breed as president of the Board of Supervisors on June 26, 2018, following Breed's election as mayor of San Francisco. Later that year, she was elected to represent District 2 on the California State Board of Equalization.

=== Controller of California ===
Cohen ran in the 2022 election for California State Controller against Republican Lanhee Chen winning the race with 55% of the vote, the lowest margin of victory for any statewide candidate that election cycle. In September 2024, Cohen announced new recommendations aimed at preventing and detecting charter school fraud.

After the death of Senator Dianne Feinstein in September 2023, Cohen was discussed as one of several possible people to serve the remainder of Feinstein’s term.

In October 2026, a federal lawsuit accused Cohen and contractors working with the Controller's Office of taking custody of and selling foreign investors' assets without adequate notice. One plaintiff alleged that California sold $708,641.22 in Google retirement stock without notifying him, while another alleged that a contractor changed his address from Cardiff, United Kingdom, to "CARDIFF, CA 00000." The plaintiffs asked a federal judge to temporarily bar the state from taking possession of additional unclaimed property while the case proceeded.

== Personal life ==
She married workers' compensation attorney Warren Pulley in May 2016.

== Electoral history ==
=== 2018 ===
California State Board of Equalization 2nd District Election, 2018
Primary election
Party	Candidate	Votes	%
Democratic	Malia Cohen	723,355	38.7
Republican	Mark Burns	502,143	26.9
Democratic	Cathleen Galgiani	480,887	25.7
Democratic	Barry Chang	163,102	8.7
Total votes		1,869,467	100.0
General election
Democratic	Malia Cohen	2,482,171	72.8
Republican	Mark Burns	927,949	27.2
Total votes		3,410,120	100.0%

=== 2022 ===
2022 California State Controller election
Primary election
Party	Candidate	Votes	%
Republican	Lanhee Chen	2,533,305	37.22%
Democratic	Malia Cohen	1,542,397	22.66%
Democratic	Yvonne Yiu	1,024,707	15.06%
Democratic	Steve Glazer	756,518	11.11%
Democratic	Ron Galperin	690,484	10.15%
Green	Laura Wells	258,053	3.79%
Total votes		6,805,874	100.0%
General election
Democratic	Malia Cohen	5,936,852	55.35%
Republican	Lanhee Chen	4,789,340	44.65%
Total votes		10,726,192	100.0%
Democratic hold			

Political offices
Preceded by London Breed	President of the San Francisco Board of Supervisors; 2018–2019	Succeeded by Norman Yee
Preceded by Betty Yee	Controller of California; 2023–present	Incumbent
