= Ted Gaines =

American politician (born 1958)

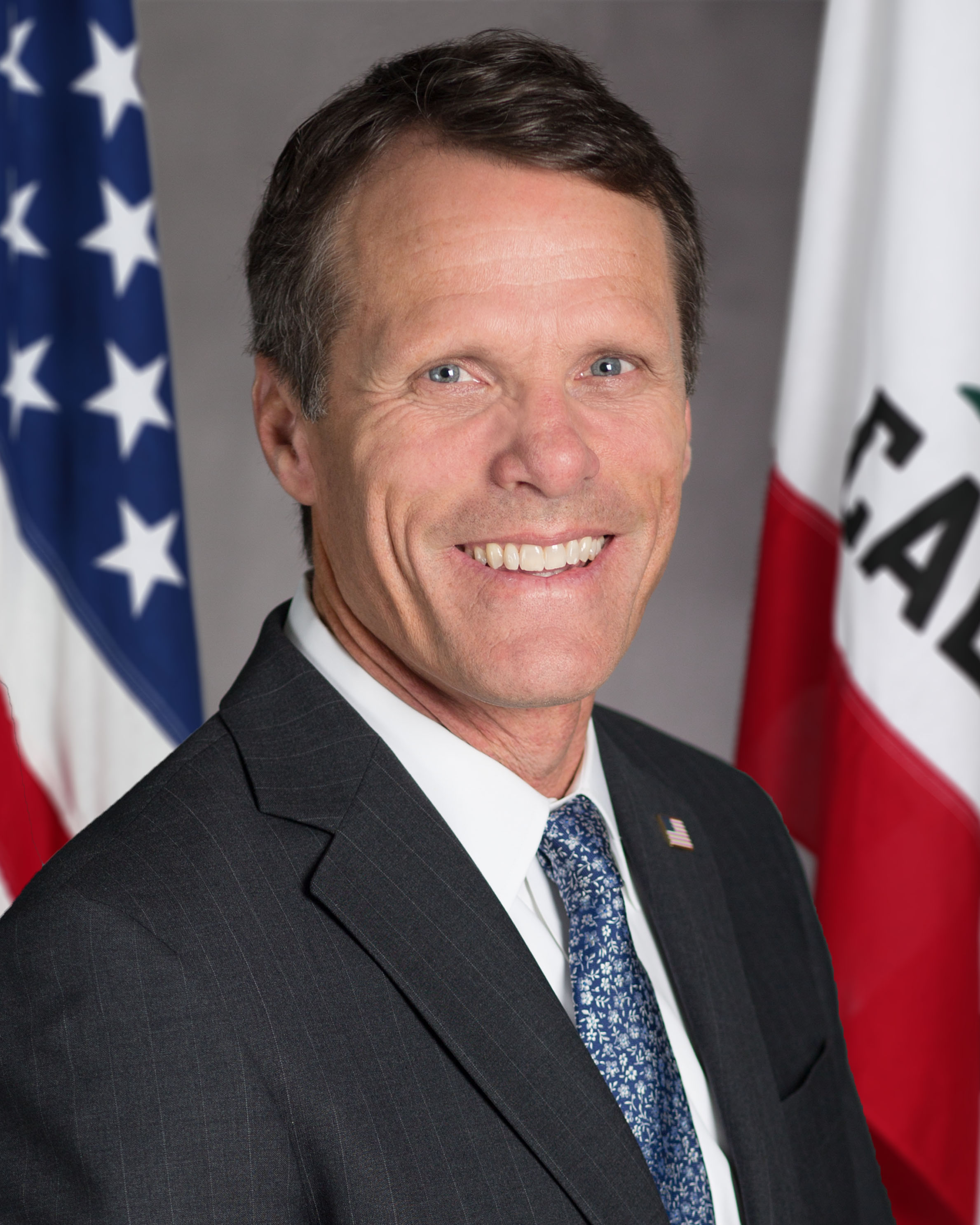
- Official portrait, 2019

Member of the California State Board of Equalization from the 1st district
- Incumbent
- Assumed office January 7, 2019
- Preceded by: George Runner

Member of the California Senate from the 1st district
- In office January 6, 2011 – January 7, 2019
- Preceded by: Dave Cox
- Succeeded by: Brian Dahle

Member of the California State Assembly from the 4th district
- In office December 4, 2006 – January 6, 2011
- Preceded by: Tim Leslie
- Succeeded by: Beth Gaines

Personal details
- Born: Edward Moore Gaines; April 25, 1958 (age 68) Roseville, California, U.S.
- Party: Republican
- Spouse: Beth Burkhard (m. 1985)
- Children: 6
- Education: Lewis and Clark College (BS)

Edward Moore Gaines (born April 25, 1958) is an American politician and businessman serving as a member of the California Board of Equalization for the 1st district. He previously served as a California State Senator, representing the 1st Senate district from 2011 to 2019.

== Career ==
Gaines is the owner of Gaines Insurance located in Roseville, California.

In 1997, Gaines was appointed to the Roseville Planning Commission, where he served for two years. In 2000, he was elected to the Placer County Board of Supervisors. He was reelected to a second term in 2004 but resigned in December 2006, two years early. As a member of the Board of Supervisors, Gaines voted in favor of several large development projects.

Assemblymember Ted Gaines resigned on January 11, 2011, creating a vacancy in California’s 4th Assembly District elections. Gaines was elected to the California State Senate in a January 4, 2011 special election to replace the late Dave Cox and took office two days later. Prior to his election to the Senate, Gaines was a California State Assemblyman, who represented the 4th district, which includes the Placer County suburbs east of Sacramento. Gaines succeeded longtime local politician Tim Leslie in the Assembly. Ted Gaines resigned from the State Senate in January 2019 after winning election to the Board of Equalization. California held a March 26 special primary and a June 4 special general election to fill the vacated Senate seat.

=== 2008 congressional election ===
Gaines formed an exploratory committee in fall of 2007 to run against longtime Congressman John Doolittle. However, before Doolittle announced he was retiring, Gaines announced he had decided to instead run for a second term in the State Assembly, for which he had neither a primary nor general election opponent.

=== 2014 insurance commissioner election ===
Gaines ran for California Insurance commissioner in 2014 against Democratic incumbent Dave Jones. They both advanced to the general election, which Jones won by 4,038,165 votes (57.5%) to 2,981,951 (42.5%).

=== 2018 Board of Equalization election ===
Gaines ran for District 1 of the California Board of Equalization in November 2018 and narrowly won with 51% of the votes.

=== 2021 gubernatorial recall election ===
Gaines was a Republican candidate for Governor of California in the 2021 California gubernatorial recall election. The 50% threshold to recall incumbent Democrat Gavin Newsom was not reached. Gaines received 0.7% of the replacement candidate vote.

== Controversy ==
Stephen Davey, Gaines' Chief of Staff, was removed from his position in 2016 due to an allegation of sexual harassment.

== Personal life ==
Gaines and his wife, Beth Gaines, who has also served in politics, currently live in El Dorado Hills with their six children.
