= Weggeland =

Weggeland is a surname. Notable people with the surname include:

- Dan Weggeland (1827–1918), Norwegian-born American artist and teacher
- Ted Weggeland (born 1963), American lawyer, politician, and corporate executive
