= California's 64th State Assembly district =

American legislative district

Current assemblymember
Blanca Pacheco; D–Downey
- Population (2010) • Voting age • Citizen voting age: 466,400; 319,811; 212,983
- Demographics: 3.30% White; 25.64% Black; 62.24% Latino; 6.68% Asian; 0.22% Native American; 1.01% Hawaiian/Pacific Islander; 0.23% other; 0.67% remainder of multiracial
- Registered voters: 235,209
- Registration: 64.01% Democratic; 8.47% Republican; 23.48% No party preference

California's 64th State Assembly district is one of 80 California State Assembly districts. It is currently represented by Democrat Blanca Pacheco of Downey.

== District profile ==
The district encompasses parts of southwestern Los Angeles County and northern Orange County and features a mix of urban and suburban communities. It is socioeconomically diverse and heavily Latino.

Los Angeles County –

- Bell
- Bell Gardens
- Cudahy
- Downey
- Norwalk
- South Whittier
- La Mirada

Orange County –

- La Habra

== Election results from statewide races ==
Year	Office	Results
2021	Recall	No 84.3 – 15.7%
2020	President	Biden 81.4 – 16.3%
2018	Governor	Newsom 85.1 – 14.9%
2018	Senator	Feinstein 60.2 – 39.8%
2016	President	Clinton 86.2 – 9.6%
2016	Senator	Harris 61.6 – 38.4%
2014	Governor	Brown 84.1 – 15.9%
2012	President	Obama 88.7 – 10.0%
2012	Senator	Feinstein 88.9 – 11.1%

== List of assembly members representing the district ==
Due to redistricting, the 64th district has been moved around different parts of the state. The current iteration resulted from the 2021 redistricting by the California Citizens Redistricting Commission.

Assembly members	Party	Years served	Electoral history	Counties represented
J. W. Cook (San Jose)	Republican	January 5, 1885 – January 3, 1887	Elected in 1884. [data missing]	Santa Clara
Charles M. Weber (Santa Clara)	Republican	January 3, 1887 – January 7, 1889	Elected in 1886. [data missing]	Santa Clara
James R. Lowe (San Jose)	Republican	January 7, 1889 – January 2, 1893	Elected in 1888. [data missing]	Santa Clara
F. A. Blakeley (Visalia)	Republican	January 2, 1893 – January 7, 1895	Elected in 1892. [data missing]	Tulare
J. W. Davis (Tulare)	Republican	January 7, 1895 – January 4, 1897	Elected in 1894. [data missing]	Tulare, Kings
James M. McClellan (Hanford)	People's	January 4, 1897 – January 2, 1899	Elected in 1896. Lost re-election as a Democrat.	Tulare, Kings
E. T. Cosper (Hanford)	Republican	January 2, 1899 – January 1, 1901	Elected in 1898. [data missing]	Tulare, Kings
R. H. Myers (Hanford)	Republican	January 1, 1901 – January 5, 1903	Elected in 1900. Redistricted to the 62nd district and lost re-election.	Tulare, Kings
Elbert M. Pyle (Santa Barbara)	Republican	January 5, 1903 – January 4, 1909	Elected in 1902. Re-elected in 1904. Re-elected in 1906. [data missing]	Santa Barbara
Samuel Fleisher (Santa Barbara)	Republican	January 4, 1909 – January 2, 1911	Elected in 1908. [data missing]	Santa Barbara
C. L. Preisker (Santa Maria)	Republican	January 2, 1911 – January 6, 1913	Elected in 1910. Redistricted to the 59th district and lost re-election.	Santa Barbara
Frank E. Woodley (Los Angeles)	Republican	January 6, 1913 – March 9, 1914	Elected in 1912. Resigned after appointment to the Los Angeles County Board of Supervisors.	Los Angeles
Vacant		March 9, 1914 – January 4, 1915		Los Angeles
Charles E. Scott (Glendale)	Republican	January 4, 1915 – January 8, 1917	Elected in 1914. [data missing]	Los Angeles
Harry Lyons (Los Angeles)	Republican	January 8, 1917 – January 6, 1919	Elected in 1916. [data missing]	Los Angeles
George A. Lynch (Los Angeles)	Republican	January 6, 1919 – January 3, 1921	Elected in 1918. [data missing]	Los Angeles
Harry Lyons (Los Angeles)	Republican	January 3, 1921 – January 2, 1933	Elected in 1920. Re-elected in 1922. Re-elected in 1924. Re-elected in 1926. Re-elected in 1928. Re-elected in 1930. Lost re-election.	Los Angeles
John D. McCarthy (Los Angeles)	Democratic	January 2, 1933 – January 4, 1937	Elected in 1932. Re-elected in 1934. [data missing]	Los Angeles
Sam Yorty (Los Angeles)	Democratic	January 4, 1937 – January 6, 1941	Elected in 1936. Re-elected in 1938. Retired to run for U.S. Senate.	Los Angeles
Roger A. Pfaff (Los Angeles)	Republican	January 6, 1941 – January 4, 1943	Elected in 1940. [data missing]	Los Angeles
John C. Lyons (Los Angeles)	Republican	January 4, 1943 – December 10, 1948	Elected in 1942. Re-elected in 1944. Re-elected in 1946. Re-elected in 1948. Died.	Los Angeles
Vacant		December 10, 1948 – April 5, 1949		Los Angeles
Sam Yorty (Los Angeles)	Democratic	April 5, 1949 – January 8, 1951	Elected to finish Lyons's term.	Los Angeles
Patrick D. McGee (Los Angeles)	Republican	January 8, 1951 – August 21, 1957	Elected in 1950. Re-elected in 1952. Re-elected in 1954. Re-elected in 1956. Resigned after election to the Los Angeles City Council.	Los Angeles
Vacant		August 21, 1957 – December 17, 1957		Los Angeles
Lou Cusanovich (Westlake Village)	Republican	December 17, 1957 – January 2, 1967	Elected to finish McGee's term. Re-elected in 1958. Re-elected in 1960. Re-elected in 1962. Re-elected in 1964. Retired to run for California State Senate.	Los Angeles
Patrick D. McGee (Los Angeles)	Republican	January 2, 1967 – May 30, 1970	Elected in 1966. Re-elected in 1968. Died.	Los Angeles
Vacant		May 30, 1970 – January 4, 1971		Los Angeles
Bob Cline (El Monte)	Republican	January 4, 1971 – November 30, 1974	Elected in 1970. Re-elected in 1972. Redistricted to the 37th district.	Los Angeles
William Campbell (Hacienda Heights)	Republican	December 2, 1974 – November 30, 1976	Redistricted from the 50th district and re-elected in 1974. Retired to run for California State Senate.	Los Angeles
M. David Stirling (La Habra Heights)	Republican	December 6, 1976 – November 30, 1982	Elected in 1976. Re-elected in 1978. Re-elected in 1980. Retired to run for California Attorney General.	Los Angeles
Ross Johnson (Fullerton)	Republican	December 6, 1982 – November 30, 1992	Redistricted from the 69th district and re-elected in 1982. Re-elected in 1984. Re-elected in 1986. Re-elected in 1988. Re-elected in 1990. Redistricted to the 72nd district.	Orange
Ted Weggeland (Riverside)	Republican	December 7, 1992 – November 30, 1996	Elected in 1992. Re-elected in 1994. Retired.	Riverside
Rod Pacheco (Riverside)	Republican	December 2, 1996 – November 30, 2002	Elected in 1996. Re-elected in 1998. Re-elected in 2000. Term-limited and ran for Riverside County District Attorney.	Riverside
John J. Benoit (Bermuda Dunes)	Republican	December 2, 2002 – November 30, 2008	Elected in 2002. Re-elected in 2004. Re-elected in 2006. Retired to run for California State Senate.	Riverside
Brian Nestande (Palm Desert)	Republican	December 1, 2008 – November 30, 2012	Elected in 2008. Re-elected in 2010. Redistricted to the 42nd district.	Riverside
Isadore Hall III (Compton)	Democratic	December 3, 2012 – November 30, 2014	Redistricted from the 52nd district and Re-elected in 2012. Retired to run for California State Senate.	Los Angeles
Mike Gipson (Carson)	Democratic	December 1, 2014 – November 30, 2022	Elected in 2014. Re-elected in 2016. Re-elected in 2018. Re-elected in 2020. Redistricted to the 65th district.	Los Angeles
Blanca Pacheco (Downey)	Democratic	December 5, 2022 – present	Elected in 2022. Re-elected in 2024.	Los Angeles, Orange

== Election results (1990-present) ==
=== 2024 ===
2024 California State Assembly 64th district election
Primary election
Party	Candidate	Votes	%
Democratic	Blanca Pacheco (incumbent)	36,075	58.3
Republican	Raul Ortiz Jr.	25,775	41.7
Total votes		61,850	100.0
General election
Democratic	Blanca Pacheco (incumbent)	102,606	62.5
Republican	Raul Ortiz Jr.	61,593	37.5
Total votes		164,199	100.0
Democratic hold			

=== 2022 ===
2022 California State Assembly 64th district election
Primary election
Party	Candidate	Votes	%
Republican	Raul Ortiz Jr.	18,048	33.0
Democratic	Blanca Pacheco	12,640	23.1
Democratic	Elizabeth Alcantar	9,558	17.5
Democratic	Rose Espinoza	4,929	9.0
Democratic	Ana M. Valencia	4,916	9.0
Democratic	Robert Cancio	4,655	8.5
Total votes		54,746	100.0
General election
Democratic	Blanca Pacheco	59,575	61.4
Republican	Raul Ortiz Jr.	37,426	38.6
Total votes		97,001	100.0
Democratic hold			

=== 2020 ===
2020 California State Assembly 64th district election
Primary election
Party	Candidate	Votes	%
Democratic	Mike Gipson (incumbent)	38,324	67.5
Democratic	Fatima S. Iqbal-Zubair	18,469	32.5
Total votes		56,793	100.0
General election
Democratic	Mike Gipson (incumbent)	83,559	59.5
Democratic	Fatima S. Iqbal-Zubair	56,875	40.5
Total votes		140,434	100.0
Democratic hold			

=== 2018 ===
2018 California State Assembly 64th district election
Primary election
Party	Candidate	Votes	%
Democratic	Mike Gipson (incumbent)	29,422	100.0
Republican	Theresa Sanford (write-in)	9	0.0
Total votes		29,431	100.0
General election
Democratic	Mike Gipson (incumbent)	83,210	84.7
Republican	Theresa Sanford	15,010	15.3
Total votes		98,220	100.0
Democratic hold			

=== 2016 ===
2016 California State Assembly 64th district election
Primary election
Party	Candidate	Votes	%
Democratic	Mike Gipson (incumbent)	46,186	76.5
Republican	Theresa Sanford	14,179	23.5
Total votes		60,365	100.0
General election
Democratic	Mike Gipson (incumbent)	86,419	73.4
Republican	Theresa Sanford	31,300	26.6
Total votes		117,719	100.0
Democratic hold			

=== 2014 ===
2014 California State Assembly 64th district election
Primary election
Party	Candidate	Votes	%
Democratic	Mike Gipson	11,975	51.0
Democratic	Prophet La'Omar Walker	5,022	21.4
Democratic	Steve Neal	3,580	15.2
Democratic	Micah Ali	2,923	12.4
Total votes		23,500	100.0
General election
Democratic	Mike Gipson	30,041	63.6
Democratic	Prophet La'Omar Walker	17,217	36.4
Total votes		47,258	100.0
Democratic hold			

=== 2012 ===
2012 California State Assembly 64th district election
Primary election
Party	Candidate	Votes	%
Democratic	Isadore Hall, III (incumbent)	23,122	100.0
Total votes		23,122	100.0
General election
Democratic	Isadore Hall, III (incumbent)	100,446	100.0
Total votes		100,446	100.0
Democratic gain from Republican			

=== 2010 ===
2010 California State Assembly 64th district election
Party	Candidate	Votes	%
Republican	Brian Nestande (incumbent)	75,737	57.3
Democratic	Jose Medina	56,574	42.7
Total votes		132,311	100.0
Republican hold			

=== 2008 ===
2008 California State Assembly 64th district election
Party	Candidate	Votes	%
Republican	Brian Nestande	124,414	100.0
Total votes		124,414	100.0
Republican hold			

=== 2006 ===
2006 California State Assembly 64th district election
Party	Candidate	Votes	%
Republican	John Benoit (incumbent)	66,501	61.1
Democratic	Paul Rasso	42,314	38.9
Total votes		108,815	100.0
Republican hold			

=== 2004 ===
2004 California State Assembly 64th district election
Party	Candidate	Votes	%
Republican	John J. Benoit (incumbent)	96,606	61.2
Democratic	Robert Melsh	61,120	38.8
Total votes		157,726	100.0
Republican hold			

=== 2002 ===
2002 California State Assembly 64th district election
Party	Candidate	Votes	%
Republican	John J. Benoit	55,351	63.3
Democratic	Robert Melsh	32,118	36.7
Total votes		87,469	100.0
Republican hold			

=== 2000 ===
2000 California State Assembly 64th district election
Party	Candidate	Votes	%
Republican	Rod Pacheco (incumbent)	60,323	54.2
Democratic	Jose Medina	43,698	39.3
Natural Law	Annie Wallack	3,977	3.6
Libertarian	Phil Turner	3,237	2.9
Total votes		111,235	100.0
Republican hold			

=== 1998 ===
1998 California State Assembly 64th district election
Party	Candidate	Votes	%
Republican	Rod Pacheco (incumbent)	64,852	100.0
Total votes		64,852	100.0
Republican hold			

=== 1996 ===
1996 California State Assembly 64th district election
Party	Candidate	Votes	%
Republican	Rod Pacheco	56,002	54.1
Democratic	Grace Slocum	43,336	41.9
Libertarian	Phil Turner	3,868	3.7
No party	Arthur Johnson (write-in)	236	0.2
Total votes		103,442	100.0
Republican hold			

=== 1994 ===
1994 California State Assembly 64th district election
Party	Candidate	Votes	%
Republican	Ted Weggeland (incumbent)	59,037	66.0
Democratic	Roberta "Bobbi" Meyer	24,606	27.5
Libertarian	Jane A. Henson	5,695	6.4
No party	Troy Lamberth (write-in)	53	0.1
Total votes		89,391	100.0
Republican hold			

=== 1992 ===
1992 California State Assembly 64th district election
Party	Candidate	Votes	%
Republican	Ted Weggeland	56,298	47.9
Democratic	Jane Carney	54,784	46.6
Libertarian	Jane A. Henson	6,572	5.6
Total votes		117,654	100.0
Republican hold			

=== 1990 ===
1990 California State Assembly 64th district election
Party	Candidate	Votes	%
Republican	Ross Johnson (incumbent)	56,646	66.0
Democratic	Kevin Grant Gardner	29,203	34.0
Total votes		85,849	100.0
Republican hold			

== See also ==
- California State Assembly
- California State Assembly districts
- Districts in California
