= 1998 California Attorney General election =

- November 3, 1998
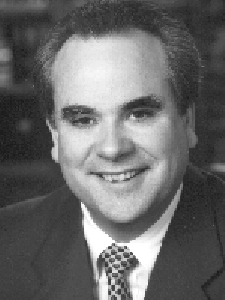

Nominee	Bill Lockyer	Dave Stirling
Party	Democratic	Republican
Popular vote	4,119,139	3,389,709
Percentage	51.5%	42.4%
- County results Lockyer: 40–50% 50–60% 60–70% 70–80% Stirling: 40–50% 50–60% 60–70%
Attorney General before election
Dan Lungren
Republican
Elected Attorney General
Bill Lockyer
Democratic

The 1998 California Attorney General election occurred on November 3, 1998. The primary elections took place on June 3, 1998. The Democratic nominee, Bill Lockyer, defeated the Republican nominee, Dave Stirling, for the office previously held by incumbent Dan Lungren, who chose not to seek re-election in favor of running for governor.

== Primary results ==
Final results from the Secretary of State of California.

=== Democratic ===
==== Candidates ====
- Bill Lockyer, State Senator
- Lynn Schenk, Former U. S. Representative
- Charles M. Calderon, State Senator
- Michael Schmeier

California Attorney General Democratic primary, 1998
Candidate	Votes	%
Bill Lockyer	1,294,166	47.27
Lynn Schenk	685,163	25.03
Charles M. Calderon	645,574	23.58
Michael Schmeier	112,875	4.12
Total votes	2,737,778	100.00

=== Republican ===
==== Candidates ====
- M. David "Dave" Stirling, Attorney, Former Assemblyman and candidate in 1982
- Mike Capizzi

California Attorney General Republican primary, 1998
Candidate	Votes	%
Dave Stirling	1,612,742	66.40
Mike Capizzi	815,919	33.60
Total votes	2,428,661	100.00

=== Peace & Freedom ===
California Attorney General Peace & Freedom primary, 1998
Candidate	Votes	%
Robert J. Evans	74,042	53.69
Gary P. Kast	63,874	46.31
Total votes	137,916	100.00

=== Others ===
California Attorney General primary, 1998 (Others)
Party	Candidate	Votes	%
Libertarian	Joseph S. Farina	86,720	100.00
American Independent	Diane Beall Templin	78,055	100.00

== General election results ==
Final results from the Secretary of State of California.

California Attorney General election, 1998
Party	Candidate	Votes	%
Democratic	Bill Lockyer	4,119,139	51.50
Republican	Dave Stirling	3,389,709	42.38
American Independent	Diane Beall Templin	194,077	2.43
Libertarian	Joseph S. Farina	149,430	1.87
Peace and Freedom	Robert J. Evans	145,379	1.82
Invalid or blank votes		623,404	7.23
Total votes		7,997,734	100.00
Turnout			41.32
Democratic gain from Republican			

=== Results by county ===
Results from the Secretary of State of California:

County	Lockyer	Votes	Stirling	Votes	Templin	Votes	Others	Votes
San Francisco	75.01%	165,888	17.38%	38,434	2.56%	5,659	5.05%	11,163
Alameda	69.43%	253,905	24.12%	88,209	2.14%	7,810	4.31%	15,766
Marin	61.95%	60,229	31.96%	31,074	2.12%	2,059	3.97%	3,860
San Mateo	61.00%	119,362	32.85%	64,276	2.39%	4,674	3.76%	7,369
Los Angeles	60.46%	1,134,245	34.38%	644,969	1.89%	35,464	3.27%	61,429
Santa Cruz	57.79%	46,925	31.47%	25,551	3.28%	2,661	7.46%	6,058
Yolo	57.12%	27,967	37.12%	18,172	1.97%	966	3.79%	1,853
Sonoma	56.91%	87,921	34.67%	53,566	3.16%	4,879	5.26%	8,129
Solano	56.55%	55,766	37.79%	37,264	2.61%	2,575	3.05%	3,012
Santa Clara	56.09%	222,707	36.94%	146,660	2.78%	11,040	4.19%	16,656
Contra Costa	55.63%	158,611	38.60%	110,060	2.30%	6,571	3.46%	9,855
Monterey	52.14%	46,315	41.05%	36,463	2.78%	2,467	4.03%	3,582
Napa	51.90%	21,621	41.29%	17,198	2.85%	1,189	3.96%	1,648
Lake	51.72%	9,521	41.73%	7,683	2.75%	506	3.80%	700
Mendocino	51.49%	14,148	36.57%	10,047	3.56%	978	8.38%	2,302
San Benito	49.67%	6,337	42.91%	5,475	3.14%	400	4.29%	547
Merced	49.30%	18,979	45.43%	17,488	2.45%	943	2.82%	1,086
Sacramento	49.17%	171,917	45.41%	158,784	2.27%	7,946	3.15%	10,997
Imperial	48.62%	11,325	41.94%	9,769	3.17%	739	6.26%	1,459
Stanislaus	46.37%	45,540	48.81%	47,937	2.08%	2,042	2.74%	2,691
Santa Barbara	46.14%	54,190	47.42%	55,699	2.42%	2,838	4.02%	4,732
San Joaquin	46.12%	55,161	48.77%	58,324	2.44%	2,915	2.68%	3,196
San Bernardino	45.87%	147,602	47.97%	154,357	2.82%	9,069	3.34%	10,738
Humboldt	45.39%	20,156	43.33%	19,243	2.79%	1,240	8.49%	3,771
Fresno	44.61%	74,110	50.02%	83,082	2.17%	3,599	3.20%	5,320
Ventura	44.53%	88,110	49.37%	97,678	2.55%	5,047	3.55%	7,014
Riverside	43.71%	145,032	50.45%	167,416	2.60%	8,635	3.23%	10,743
Kings	42.99%	9,557	50.77%	11,286	2.68%	596	3.56%	792
Tuolumne	42.54%	8,311	51.68%	10,098	2.55%	499	3.23%	631
Del Norte	42.52%	3,087	49.60%	3,601	3.58%	260	4.30%	312
San Luis Obispo	42.22%	35,521	51.76%	43,542	2.66%	2,241	3.35%	2,822
San Diego	42.06%	289,580	51.12%	351,967	2.92%	20,089	3.91%	26,901
Alpine	41.07%	223	48.25%	262	5.52%	30	5.15%	28
Amador	41.04%	5,331	53.80%	6,988	2.11%	274	3.05%	396
Yuba	40.82%	5,424	52.17%	6,933	3.25%	432	3.76%	500
Trinity	40.49%	1,969	47.48%	2,309	5.16%	251	6.87%	334
Tehama	39.75%	7,228	52.65%	9,572	3.92%	712	3.69%	670
Butte	39.47%	24,949	53.85%	34,037	2.87%	1,814	3.81%	2,408
Siskiyou	39.22%	6,331	52.46%	8,468	3.57%	577	4.75%	767
Calaveras	39.16%	6,177	52.34%	8,256	2.68%	423	5.82%	918
Plumas	38.92%	3,253	55.13%	4,608	2.62%	219	3.33%	278
Tulare	38.74%	27,663	56.23%	40,154	2.06%	1,472	2.98%	2,123
Mono	38.66%	1,302	54.10%	1,822	2.29%	77	4.96%	167
Nevada	38.14%	14,327	55.61%	20,889	2.54%	955	3.71%	1,390
Orange	37.60%	254,444	56.50%	382,392	2.48%	16,803	3.43%	23,159
Kern	37.35%	50,571	56.51%	76,512	2.74%	3,713	3.39%	4,588
Madera	36.86%	9,520	57.06%	14,736	2.46%	636	3.61%	933
Mariposa	36.85%	2,567	54.64%	3,806	3.22%	224	5.30%	369
El Dorado	36.44%	20,531	57.23%	32,240	2.63%	1,484	3.70%	2,084
Sierra	36.31%	618	53.94%	918	3.58%	61	6.17%	105
Lassen	36.04%	2,921	56.00%	4,538	3.83%	310	4.14%	335
Placer	36.01%	30,488	58.11%	49,202	2.25%	1,903	3.64%	3,077
Shasta	35.84%	18,581	57.19%	29,653	3.65%	1,893	3.32%	1,721
Colusa	35.68%	1,695	59.82%	2,842	1.60%	76	2.91%	138
Inyo	35.36%	2,328	57.52%	3,787	3.37%	222	3.75%	247
Glenn	35.17%	2,592	58.34%	4,299	3.12%	230	3.37%	248
Sutter	34.04%	7,328	60.97%	13,126	2.42%	521	2.58%	554
Modoc	33.03%	1,132	58.01%	1,988	4.93%	169	4.03%	138

== See also ==
- California state elections, 1998
- California Attorney General
- List of attorneys general of California
