= The Schenk Law Firm, LLP =

San Diego litigation and transactional law firm

- Headquarters: San Diego, California, United States
- Major practice areas: Personal injury, mass tort litigation, AI and digital tort litigation, civil rights, environmental law, business advisory
- Key people: Frederick Schenk (Founding Managing Partner); Lynn Schenk (Co-founder); Benjamin Schenk (Co-founder); David Lizerbram (Partner)
- Date founded: February 2025

The Schenk Law Firm, LLP is a comprehensive litigation and transactional law firm based in San Diego, California, founded in February 2025 by trial attorney Frederick ("Fred") Schenk, former U.S. Representative Lynn Schenk, and attorney Benjamin Schenk. The firm's practice areas include personal injury, mass tort litigation, AI and digital tort related litigation, civil rights, environmental law, and business advisory services. In February 2026, the firm merged with Lizerbram Law, APC, adding transactional and intellectual property capabilities to create a full-service legal platform.

== History ==
The Schenk Law Firm launched in February 2025, combining trial-law expertise, public-sector leadership, and financial experience. Fred Schenk, who spent approximately 40 years as a partner at Casey Gerry Schenk Francavilla Blatt & Penfield, LLP, is the firm's founding managing partner. Lynn Schenk, who served in the U.S. House of Representatives and as chief of staff to California Governor Gray Davis, joined as co-founder. Benjamin Schenk, a trial attorney and Bridgewater Associates alumnus, joined as co-founder.

In February 2026, the firm finalized a merger with Lizerbram Law, APC. David Lizerbram joined as partner to lead transactional and business advisory work, making the combined practice one of the few plaintiff litigation firms with an integrated business law component.

== Practice areas and representative matters ==
=== AI chatbot litigation ===
In January 2026, the firm filed DeCruise v. OpenAI, Inc. in California Superior Court on behalf of a Morehouse College student who alleged that interactions with ChatGPT's GPT-4o model caused severe psychiatric harm, including a psychosis diagnosis and hospitalization.

Attorney Benjamin Schenk stated that OpenAI "engineered GPT-4o to simulate emotional intimacy, foster psychological dependency, and blur the line between human and machine." The firm has positioned itself as "AI injury attorneys" and is investigating additional AI-related mental health claims nationwide.

In October 2026, the firm filed Wan v. OpenAI, Inc. in California on behalf of the family of Bowen Wan, a 31-year-old Seattle software engineer with epilepsy who died in February 2026. The complaint alleges that ChatGPT's GPT-4o model gave Wan a 25-day schedule to taper off her anti-seizure medication, lamotrigine, and told her not to mention the plan to her doctor. It attributes her death to sudden unexpected death in epilepsy (SUDEP). OpenAI described the death as "an incredibly heartbreaking situation" and said that ChatGPT is not a substitute for medical care.

=== Personal injury and wrongful death ===
The firm's personal injury practice focuses on significant injury cases and wrongful death claims, including matters involving asbestos-related harm, automobile and bicycle collisions, construction negligence, and traumatic brain injury. Fred Schenk obtained the largest verdict ever in San Diego against an asbestos manufacturer, Owens Corning Fiberglass.

=== Tobacco litigation ===
In the 1990s, Fred Schenk served as a personal legal advisor to then-Lieutenant Governor Gray Davis in a private attorney general action against tobacco companies that resulted in the recovery of billions of dollars for the State of California. The broader 1998 Master Settlement Agreement between tobacco companies and U.S. states resulted in payments of hundreds of billions of dollars.

=== NFL concussion multidistrict litigation ===
In 2012, U.S. District Judge Anita Brody appointed Fred Schenk to the Plaintiffs' Steering Committee overseeing the national multidistrict litigation (MDL) against the National Football League (NFL), alleging that repeated concussions can result in long-term brain injuries including chronic traumatic encephalopathy (CTE).

=== Social media youth addiction litigation ===
In 2023, Los Angeles Superior Court judge Carolyn Kuhl appointed Fred Schenk to the plaintiffs' steering committee in the California Judicial Council Coordination Proceedings (JCCP) involving litigation over alleged harms tied to youth social media addiction. The proceedings involve claims against several major social media companies, including Meta Platforms, Inc., YouTube, LLC, TikTok Inc., and Snap Inc.

== Leadership ==
=== Frederick ("Fred") Schenk — Founding Managing Partner ===
Frederick Schenk graduated from UCLA (B.A., 1975) and the University of San Diego School of Law (J.D., 1978), where he serves on the Board of Visitors. In 2004, he provided pro bono representation through Trial Lawyers Care—the largest pro bono effort in American legal history—on behalf of a family that lost a loved one in the September 11 attacks, obtaining a seven-figure resolution for which he accepted no fee. He served as president of the Civil Justice Foundation (2005–2006) and president of the San Diego chapter of the American Board of Trial Advocates (ABOTA) in 2021.

Schenk has served for approximately 15 years on the board of the 22nd District Agricultural Association, the California state institution that governs the Del Mar Fairgrounds, serving as board chair from 2013 to 2015 and again from 2023 to 2025. He was inducted into the Lawdragon Hall of Fame, received the 2024 USD Distinguished Alumni Award, and was named one of San Diego's Top 50 Most Influential by the San Diego Daily Transcript.

=== Lynn Schenk — Co-founder ===
Lynn Schenk is a co-founder of the firm and a former member of the United States House of Representatives, representing California's 49th congressional district from 1993 to 1995. She subsequently served as chief of staff to California Governor Gray Davis and was previously a member of the board of directors for Biogen Inc. and Sempra Energy.

=== Benjamin Schenk — Co-founder ===
Benjamin Schenk graduated magna cum laude from Dartmouth College (A.B. in Government) and holds a J.D. from the University of San Diego School of Law (2020). He serves on the USD School of Law Alumni Association Board of Directors and on the boards of the Lawrence Family Jewish Community Center and the Burn Institute. He has been quoted on AI-related legal issues by Ars Technica and Mashable and on teen sports betting addiction by the New York Post.

=== David Lizerbram — Partner ===
David Lizerbram joined the firm as partner in February 2026 following the merger with Lizerbram Law, APC. He leads the firm's transactional and business advisory practice. Lizerbram has presented annually at San Diego Comic-Con since 2008 as part of the Comic Book Law School® panel series on intellectual property law, and was appointed by Governor Jerry Brown to the Board of Directors of the 22nd District Agricultural Association, which oversees the Del Mar Fairgrounds, serving from 2011 to 2015.

== Recognition ==
The firm is ranked by Best Law Firms (Best Lawyers) in San Diego for mass tort litigation and class actions on the plaintiffs' side, and is also listed in the Super Lawyers directory for California.
