= 2002 California elections =

- November 5, 2002
- Registered: 15,303,469
- Turnout: 50.57% (▼20.37 pp)

Elections were held in California on November 5, 2002. Primary elections were held on March 5. Up for election were all the seats of the California State Assembly, 20 seats of the California Senate, seven constitutional officers, all the seats of the California Board of Equalization, as well as votes on retention of two Supreme Court justices and various appeals court judges. Seven ballot measures were also up for approval. Municipal offices were also included in the election.

The incumbent governor Gray Davis won reelection with less than 50% of the vote over his Republican challenger Bill Simon. Democrats also won every other statewide office and maintained their majorities in both houses of the state legislature.

== Constitutional Offices ==
=== Governor ===
Final results from the California Secretary of State:

2002 California gubernatorial election
Party	Candidate	Votes	%
Democratic	Gray Davis (incumbent)	3,533,490	47.3
Republican	Bill Simon	3,169,801	42.4
Green	Peter Miguel Camejo	393,036	5.3
Libertarian	Gary David Copeland	161,203	2.2
American Independent	Reinhold Gulke	128,035	1.7
Natural Law	Iris Adam	88,415	1.1
Turnout			
Democratic hold			

=== Lieutenant governor ===
Final results from the California Secretary of State:

2002 Lieutenant Governor of California election
Party	Candidate	Votes	%
Democratic	Cruz Bustamante (incumbent)	3,589,804	49.5
Republican	Bruce McPherson	3,031,571	41.8
Green	Donna J. Warren	298,951	4.1
Libertarian	Pat Wright	104,920	1.4
American Independent	James D. King	91,015	1.2
Reform	Paul Jerry Hanosh	80,307	1.1
Natural Law	Kalee Przybylak	66,847	0.9
Total votes		7,263,415	100.0
Turnout			
Democratic hold			

=== Secretary of State ===
Final results from the California Secretary of State:

2002 California Secretary of State election
Party	Candidate	Votes	%
Democratic	Kevin Shelley	3,295,397	46.4
Republican	Keith Olberg	3,008,539	42.3
Green	Lawrence H. Shoup	274,523	3.9
Libertarian	Gail Lightfoot	200,146	2.8
Natural Law	Louise Marie Allison	173,139	2.4
American Independent	Edward C. Noonan	85,791	1.2
Reform	Valli Sharpe-Geisler	76,875	1.0
Total votes		7,114,410	100.0
Turnout			
Democratic gain from Republican			

=== Controller ===
Final results from the California Secretary of State:

2002 California State Controller election
Party	Candidate	Votes	%
Democratic	Steve Westly	3,228,908	45.4
Republican	Tom McClintock	3,206,178	45.1
Green	Laura Wells	409,172	5.8
Natural Law	J. Carlos Aguirre	176,791	2.4
American Independent	Ernest F. Vance	94,088	1.3
Total votes		7,115,137	100.0
Turnout			
Democratic hold			

=== Treasurer ===
Final results from the California Secretary of State:

2002 California State Treasurer election
Party	Candidate	Votes	%
Democratic	Phil Angelides (incumbent)	3,481,146	49.4
Republican	Phillip Gregory Conlon	2,853,997	40.5
Green	Jeanne-Marie Rosenmeier	346,423	5.0
Libertarian	Marian Smithson	165,040	2.3
Natural Law	Sylvia Valentine	109,259	1.5
American Independent	Nathan E. Johnson	94,974	1.3
Total votes		7,050,839	100.0
Turnout			
Democratic hold			

=== Attorney general ===
Final results from the California Secretary of State:

2002 California Attorney General election
Party	Candidate	Votes	%
Democratic	Bill Lockyer (incumbent)	3,646,829	51.4
Republican	Dick Ackerman	2,860,542	40.4
Green	Glen Freeman Mowrer	275,475	3.9
American Independent	Diane B. Templin	190,187	2.6
Libertarian	Ed Kuwatch	124,504	1.7
Total votes		7,097,447	100.0
Turnout			
Democratic hold			

=== Insurance Commissioner ===
Final results from the California Secretary of State:

2002 California Insurance Commissioner election
Party	Candidate	Votes	%
Democratic	John Garamendi	3,283,367	46.6
Republican	Gary Mendoza	2,937,820	41.7
Green	David Ishmael Sheidlower	270,295	3.9
Libertarian	Dale F. Ogden	232,182	3.2
Natural Law	Raul Calderon	188,283	2.6
American Independent	Steven A. Klein	146,200	2.0
Total votes		7,058,147	100.0
Turnout			
Democratic hold			

== Board of Equalization ==
=== Overview ===
California Board of Equalization elections, 2002
Party	Votes	Percentage	Seats	+/–
Democratic	3,391,313	50.28%	2	0
Republican	3,092,030	45.84%	2	0
Libertarian	262,083	3.89%	0	0
Totals	6,745,426	100.00%	4	—

=== District 1 ===
Final results from the California Secretary of State:

2002 State Board of Equalization District 1 election
Party	Candidate	Votes	%
Democratic	Carole Migden	1,171,688	60.64
Republican	David J. Neighbors	648,849	33.59
Libertarian	Elizabeth C. Brierly	111,386	5.77
Total votes		1,931,923	100.00
Turnout			
Democratic hold			

=== District 2 ===
Final results from the California Secretary of State:

2002 State Board of Equalization District 2 election
Party	Candidate	Votes	%
Republican	Bill Leonard	1,027,716	58.54
Democratic	Tim Raboy	728,061	41.46
Total votes		1,755,777	100.0
Turnout			
Republican hold			

=== District 3 ===
Final results from the California Secretary of State:

2002 State Board of Equalization District 3 election
Party	Candidate	Votes	%
Republican	Claude Parrish (incumbent)	1,008,170	58.93
Democratic	Mary Christian-Heising	636,300	37.20
Libertarian	J. R. Graham	66,171	3.87
Total votes		1,710,641	100.00
Turnout			
Republican hold			

=== District 4 ===
Final results from the California Secretary of State:

2002 State Board of Equalization District 4 election
Party	Candidate	Votes	%
Democratic	John Chiang (incumbent)	855,264	63.49
Republican	Glen R. Forsch	407,295	30.24
Libertarian	Kenneth A. Weissman	84,526	6.27
Total votes		1,347,085	100.00
Turnout			
Democratic hold			

== Judicial system ==
=== Supreme Court of California ===
Final results from the California Secretary of State:

Associate Justice Marvin Baxter, Seat 1
Vote on retention	Votes	%	±%
Yes	3,455,084	71.6%	
No	1,373,645	28.4%	
Total votes	4,828,729	100.0%	
Majority	2,081,439	43.2%	
Turnout			

Supreme Court Seat 1 Retention election results by county Yes: 80–90%; 70–80%; 60–70%

Associate Justice Kathryn Werdegar, Seat 2
Vote on retention	Votes	%	±%
Yes	3,704,040	74.2%	
No	1,294,277	25.8%	
Total votes	4,998,317	100.0%	
Majority	2,409,763	48.4%	
Turnout			

Supreme Court Seat 2 Retention election results by county Yes: 90–100%; 80–90%; 70–80%; 60–70%; 50–60%

Associate Justice Carlos Moreno, Seat 3
Vote on retention	Votes	%	±%
Yes	3,628,632	72.6%	
No	1,370,685	27.4%	
Total votes	4,999,317	100.0%	
Majority	2,257,947	45.2%	
Turnout			

Supreme Court Seat 3 Retention election results by county Yes: 90–100%; 80–90%; 70–80%; 60–70%; 50–60%

=== California Courts of Appeal ===
See California Courts of Appeal elections, 2002.

== California State Legislature elections ==
=== State Senate ===
There are 40 seats in the State Senate. For this election, candidates running in odd-numbered districts ran for four-year terms.

California State Senate - 2002	Seats
Democratic-Held	25
Republican-Held	15
2002 Elections
Democratic Held and Uncontested	11
Contested	15
Republican Held and Uncontested	14
Total	40

=== State Assembly ===
All 80 biennially elected seats of the State Assembly were up for election this year. Each seat has a two-year term. The Democrats retained control of the State Assembly.

California State Assembly - 2002	Seats
Democratic-Held	48
Republican-Held	32
2002 Elections
Democratic Incumbent and Uncontested	32
Contested, Open Seats	32
Republican Incumbent and Uncontested	16
Total	80

== Statewide ballot propositions ==
Seven propositions qualified to be listed on the general election ballot in California. Five of them passed.

=== Proposition 46 ===
Proposition 46 would create a trust fund by selling $2.1 billion in general obligation funds to fund 21 types of housing programs, including multifamily, individual and farmworker housing. Proposition 46 passed with 57.5% approval.

Proposition 46 results by county Yes: 70–80%; 60–70%; 50–60%; No: 60–70%; 50–60%

=== Proposition 47 ===
The state would sell $13 billion in general obligation bonds for construction and renovation of K-12 school facilities and higher education facilities. Proposition 47 passed with 59% approval.

Proposition 47 results by county Yes: 70–80%; 60–70%; 50–60%; No: 60–70%; 50–60%

=== Proposition 48 ===
Would amend the Constitution to delete references to the municipal courts. Proposition 48 passed with 72.8% approval.

Proposition 48 results by county Yes: 80–90%; 70–80%; 60–70%; 50–60%

=== Proposition 49 ===
Would substantially increase funding for before and after-school programs, and make general funds permanently earmarked for the programs beginning in the 2004–2005 school year. Proposition 49 passed with 56.6% approval.

Proposition 49 results by county Yes: 60–70%; 50–60%; No: 60–70%; 50–60%

=== Proposition 50 ===
The state would borrow $3.4 billion through the sale of general obligation bonds for water projects. Proposition 50 passed with 55.4% approval.

Proposition 50 results by county Yes: 60–70%; 50–60%; No: 80–90%; 70–80%; 60–70%; 50–60%

=== Proposition 51 ===
Would permanently allocate sales and use taxes raised from the sale or lease of motor vehicles to specific transportation projects. Proposition 51 failed with 41.4% approval.

Proposition 51 results by county No: 70–80%; 60–70%; 50–60%; Yes: 50–60%

=== Proposition 52 ===
Would allow legally eligible California residents presenting proof of current residence to register to vote on Election Day (same-day voter registration). Proposition 52 failed with 40.6% approval.

Proposition 52 results by county No: 70–80%; 60–70%; 50–60%; Yes: 50–60%

== See also ==
- California State Legislature
- California State Assembly, California State Assembly elections, 2002
- California State Senate, California State Senate elections, 2002
- Political party strength in U.S. states
- Political party strength in California
- Elections in California
