= 2002 California Attorney General election =

- November 5, 2002
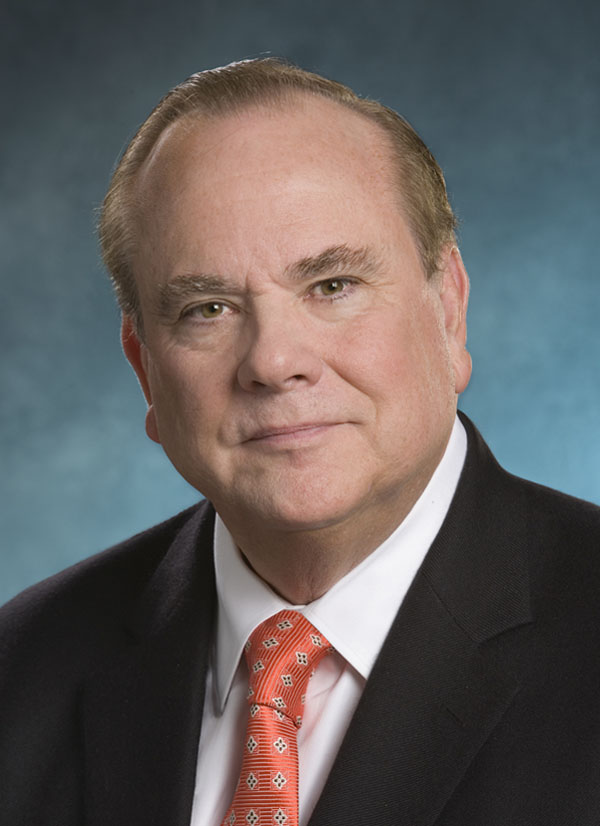

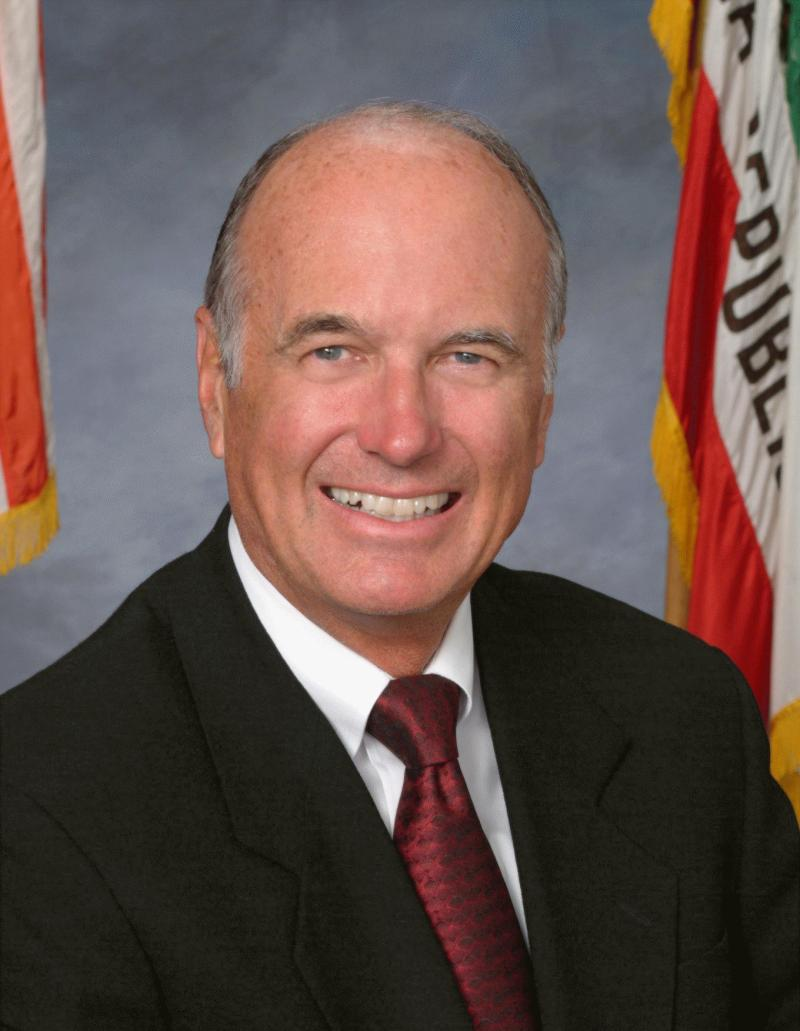
Nominee	Bill Lockyer	Dick Ackerman
Party	Democratic	Republican
Popular vote	3,716,282	2,920,752
Percentage	51.3%	40.3%
- County results Lockyer: 40–50% 50–60% 60–70% 70–80% Ackerman: 40–50% 50–60% 60–70%
Attorney General before election
Bill Lockyer
Democratic
Elected Attorney General
Bill Lockyer
Democratic

The 2002 California Attorney General election occurred on November 5, 2002. The primary elections took place on March 5, 2002. The Democratic incumbent, Bill Lockyer, easily defeated the Republican nominee, State Senate Minority Leader Dick Ackerman.

== Background ==
In March 2002, the Los Angeles Times reported that, while Lockyer's first term had drawn criticism from the left and right, his extensive fundraising deterred many prospective challengers from running against him. The California Republican Party eventually recruited State Senate Minority Leader Dick Ackerman after struggling to find other candidates. In the Democratic primary, Lockyer faced a minor challenge from attorney Mike Schmier.

== Primary results ==
=== Democratic ===
California Attorney General Democratic primary, 2002
Candidate	Votes	%
Bill Lockyer	1,715,460	82.93
Mike Schmier	353,228	17.07
Total votes	2,068,688	100.00

=== Others ===
California Attorney General primary, 2002 (Others)
Party	Candidate	Votes	%
Republican	Dick Ackerman	1,838,007	100.00
Green	Glen Freeman Mowrer	35,253	100.00
American Independent	Diane Beall Templin	27,135	100.00
Libertarian	Ed Kuwatch	19,089	100.00

== Results ==
California Attorney General election, 2002
Party	Candidate	Votes	%
Democratic	Bill Lockyer (incumbent)	3,716,282	51.32
Republican	Dick Ackerman	2,920,752	40.33
Green	Glen Freeman Mowrer	283,173	3.91
American Independent	Diane Beall Templin	194,358	2.68
Libertarian	Ed Kuwatch	127,152	1.76
Invalid or blank votes		497,104	6.42
Total votes		7,241,717	100.00
Turnout			36.05
Democratic hold			

=== Results by county ===
Results from the Secretary of State of California.

County	Lockyer	Votes	Ackerman	Votes	Mowrer	Votes	Templin	Votes	Kuwatch	Votes
San Francisco	73.75%	150,730	14.88%	30,419	7.77%	15,882	1.97%	4,026	1.62%	3,316
Alameda	68.98%	232,180	20.96%	70,550	6.85%	23,072	1.83%	6,161	1.38%	4,639
Marin	63.27%	55,164	26.40%	23,015	7.34%	6,403	1.55%	1,350	1.44%	1,257
San Mateo	62.35%	104,457	28.39%	47,553	4.89%	8,191	2.72%	4,553	1.65%	2,766
Los Angeles	59.67%	978,010	32.21%	527,970	3.60%	59,008	2.72%	44,611	1.80%	29,450
Santa Clara	58.74%	203,254	32.45%	112,292	4.15%	14,345	2.62%	9,065	2.05%	7,081
Santa Cruz	58.60%	44,484	25.97%	19,712	10.36%	7,863	2.37%	1,797	2.71%	2,060
Contra Costa	57.34%	144,312	34.64%	87,169	3.89%	9,789	2.58%	6,486	1.56%	3,915
Sonoma	56.59%	80,404	29.71%	42,216	8.73%	12,406	2.91%	4,141	2.06%	2,925
Monterey	56.47%	48,391	35.02%	30,009	3.59%	3,077	2.77%	2,377	2.15%	1,840
Solano	55.46%	48,085	37.00%	32,080	3.09%	2,683	2.93%	2,543	1.51%	1,308
Imperial	55.28%	11,916	37.23%	8,024	2.45%	528	3.63%	783	1.41%	304
Napa	54.28%	19,688	36.33%	13,175	4.83%	1,751	2.65%	962	1.91%	693
Yolo	54.06%	24,841	35.49%	16,307	6.51%	2,993	2.25%	1,032	1.68%	774
San Benito	53.17%	6,500	39.47%	4,826	2.68%	328	2.91%	356	1.77%	216
Lake	51.97%	8,236	38.60%	6,117	4.67%	740	2.78%	440	1.99%	315
Mendocino	50.66%	12,323	30.69%	7,465	12.48%	3,036	2.72%	661	3.45%	838
Sacramento	49.55%	154,010	42.31%	131,519	3.73%	11,607	2.97%	9,230	1.44%	4,474
Merced	49.14%	19,577	44.32%	17,657	2.12%	845	3.01%	1,201	1.40%	556
Humboldt	48.22%	20,219	34.86%	14,616	12.36%	5,184	1.99%	836	2.57%	1,076
San Joaquin	48.12%	57,712	44.94%	53,902	2.63%	3,152	2.86%	3,426	1.45%	1,739
Stanislaus	47.56%	45,227	45.88%	43,632	2.47%	2,353	2.85%	2,709	1.24%	1,180
Alpine	46.81%	257	37.70%	207	7.10%	39	5.83%	32	2.55%	14
Santa Barbara	46.47%	51,671	44.31%	49,272	5.32%	5,918	2.25%	2,499	1.66%	1,842
Ventura	45.25%	84,750	46.72%	87,496	3.29%	6,165	2.78%	5,203	1.95%	3,661
Del Norte	44.80%	2,980	45.04%	2,996	3.52%	234	3.92%	261	2.72%	181
San Bernardino	44.40%	120,704	48.27%	131,235	2.32%	6,302	3.30%	8,980	1.71%	4,652
San Diego	44.30%	278,746	47.99%	301,980	2.95%	18,536	2.84%	17,901	1.92%	12,056
Kings	43.88%	9,184	51.14%	10,703	1.29%	270	2.74%	573	0.96%	200
Fresno	43.80%	66,829	50.02%	76,307	2.16%	3,298	2.73%	4,169	1.28%	1,959
Riverside	43.37%	129,958	50.35%	150,867	2.01%	6,013	2.85%	8,538	1.42%	4,252
Amador	42.70%	5,499	49.80%	6,413	2.98%	384	2.98%	384	1.53%	197
Tuolumne	42.38%	7,545	49.58%	8,827	3.56%	633	2.99%	532	1.49%	265
Trinity	41.43%	1,988	45.24%	2,171	5.58%	268	4.04%	194	3.71%	178
San Luis Obispo	40.46%	32,382	50.17%	40,153	4.84%	3,875	2.51%	2,010	2.02%	1,616
Mono	39.54%	1,155	49.81%	1,455	5.27%	154	2.77%	81	2.60%	76
Calaveras	39.41%	5,913	50.42%	7,564	4.58%	687	3.37%	505	2.23%	334
Tulare	37.81%	23,457	56.62%	35,121	1.67%	1,033	2.72%	1,687	1.18%	735
Nevada	37.80%	14,613	50.87%	19,665	6.90%	2,669	2.51%	969	1.92%	744
Tehama	37.62%	5,749	53.84%	8,228	2.76%	422	3.28%	502	2.50%	382
Butte	37.32%	22,400	51.38%	30,842	6.54%	3,926	2.89%	1,734	1.87%	1,121
Mariposa	37.27%	2,367	53.14%	3,375	4.02%	255	3.90%	248	1.67%	106
Plumas	37.20%	2,880	53.36%	4,131	3.77%	292	3.62%	280	2.05%	159
Madera	36.99%	9,624	56.83%	14,785	1.89%	492	2.84%	738	1.45%	377
Kern	36.66%	48,802	56.98%	75,851	1.72%	2,296	2.83%	3,761	1.81%	2,409
Siskiyou	36.44%	5,577	53.81%	8,235	3.54%	542	3.02%	462	3.20%	489
Placer	36.28%	34,531	57.14%	54,387	2.82%	2,684	2.40%	2,288	1.35%	1,286
El Dorado	36.00%	19,821	55.32%	30,464	3.97%	2,188	2.89%	1,594	1.81%	998
Sierra	35.77%	509	53.27%	758	3.51%	50	3.87%	55	3.58%	51
Orange	35.52%	219,839	57.40%	355,234	2.54%	15,718	2.60%	16,082	1.94%	12,009
Inyo	35.54%	2,195	55.17%	3,408	3.71%	229	3.22%	199	2.36%	146
Shasta	35.29%	16,974	57.07%	27,451	2.27%	1,094	3.16%	1,522	2.20%	1,059
Lassen	34.92%	2,661	56.86%	4,333	2.09%	159	4.03%	307	2.10%	160
Yuba	34.90%	4,006	56.50%	6,486	3.36%	386	3.65%	419	1.59%	182
Colusa	34.49%	1,546	59.74%	2,678	1.87%	84	2.23%	100	1.67%	75
Sutter	33.53%	6,390	60.65%	11,558	1.95%	372	2.59%	494	1.28%	243
Glenn	31.72%	2,042	60.44%	3,891	2.87%	185	2.94%	189	2.03%	131
Modoc	30.77%	1,018	60.46%	2,000	2.57%	85	3.63%	120	2.57%	85

== See also ==
- California state elections, 2002
- State of California
- California Attorney General
- List of attorneys general of California
