= Blanca Pacheco =

American politician

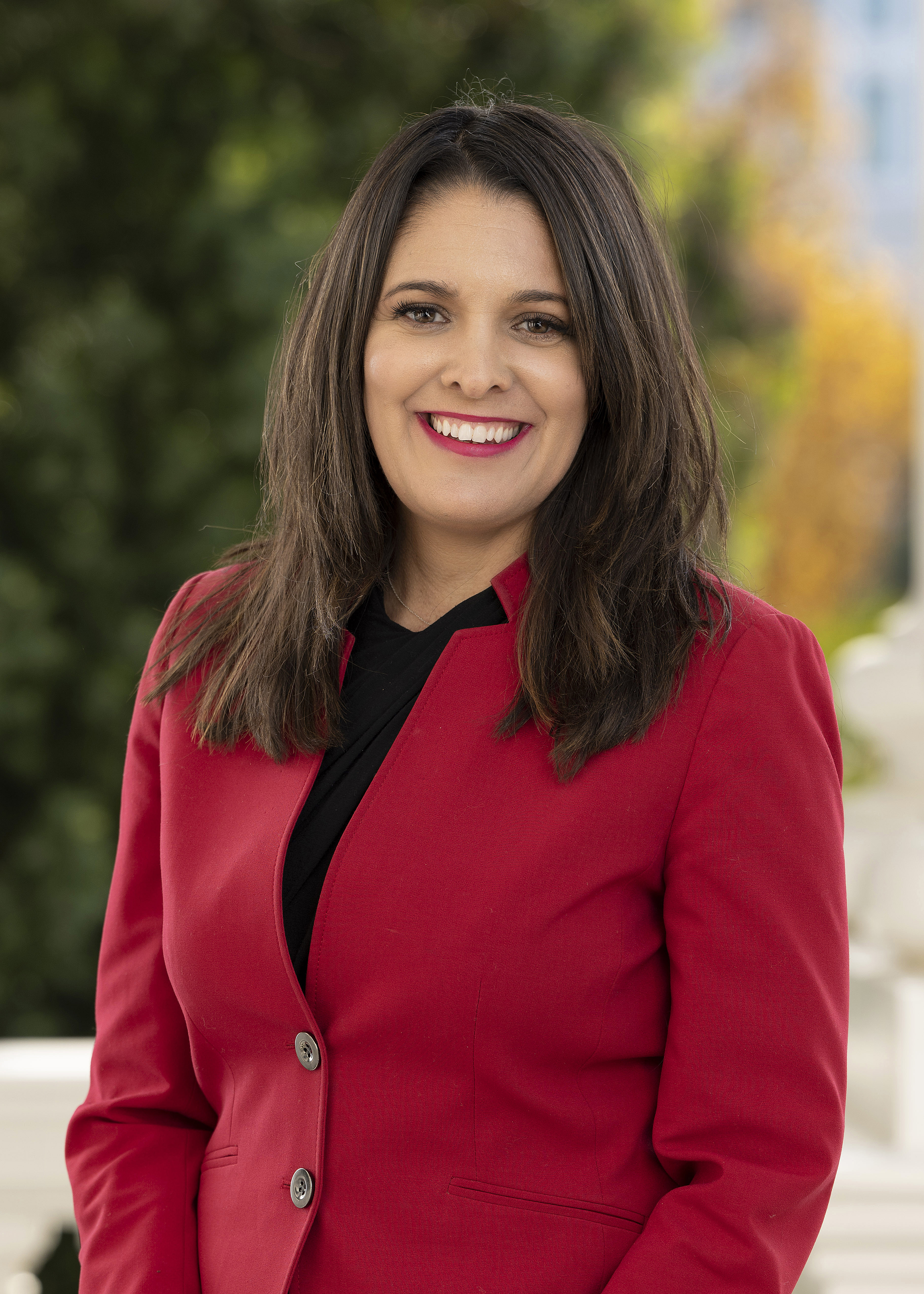

Member of the California State Assembly from the 64th district
- Incumbent
- Assumed office December 5, 2022
- Preceded by: Cristina Garcia

Personal details
- Born: April 17, 1974 (age 52)
- Party: Democratic
- Education: University of California, Los Angeles (BA); Loyola Marymount University (JD)

Blanca Pacheco (born April 17, 1974) is an American attorney and politician serving as a member of the California State Assembly for the 64th district, which includes Downey, Norwalk, Whittier, and La Mirada. She assumed office on December 5, 2022.

== Early life and education ==
After graduating from Downey High School, Pacheco attended Cerritos College, later transferred and earned a Bachelor of Arts degree in political science from the University of California, Los Angeles and a Juris Doctor from the Loyola Law School.

== Career ==
From 2006 to 2014, Pacheco worked as an attorney and real estate broker at Realty Executives in Pico Rivera, California. From 2006 to 2018, she operated an independent legal practice, specializing in probate, estates, and evictions. Pacheco joined Olivarez Madruga Lemieux O’Neill, LLP, in El Monte in 2020. She also served as a member of the Downey City Council and as Mayor of Downey. Pacheco was elected to the California State Assembly in November 2022.

== First Assembly term ==
Pacheco chairs the Assembly Rules Committee and serves on the Judiciary, Governmental Organization and Local Government committees.

In April 2024, Pacheco reintroduced a bill to permit California residents to use accents, umlauts, tildes, and other diacritical marks on official records.

== Electoral history ==
=== Downey City Council ===
2020 Downey City Council 1st district election
Candidate	Votes	%
Blanca Pacheco	6,389	68.83
Alexandria Contreras	2,893	31.17
Total votes	9,282	100.00

=== California State Assembly ===
2022 California State Assembly 64th district election
Primary election
Party	Candidate	Votes	%
Republican	Raul Ortiz Jr.	18,048	33.0
Democratic	Blanca Pacheco	12,640	23.1
Democratic	Elizabeth Alcantar	9,558	17.5
Democratic	Rose Espinoza	4,929	9.0
Democratic	Ana M. Valencia	4,916	9.0
Democratic	Robert Cancio	4,655	8.5
Total votes		54,746	100.0
General election
Democratic	Blanca Pacheco	59,575	61.4
Republican	Raul Ortiz Jr.	37,426	38.6
Total votes		97,001	100.0
Democratic hold			

2024 California State Assembly 64th district election
Primary election
Party	Candidate	Votes	%
Democratic	Blanca Pacheco (incumbent)	36,075	58.3
Republican	Raul Ortiz Jr.	25,775	41.7
Total votes		61,850	100.0
General election
Democratic	Blanca Pacheco (incumbent)	102,606	62.5
Republican	Raul Ortiz Jr.	61,593	37.5
Total votes		164,199	100.0
Democratic hold			
