= John J. Benoit =

American politician

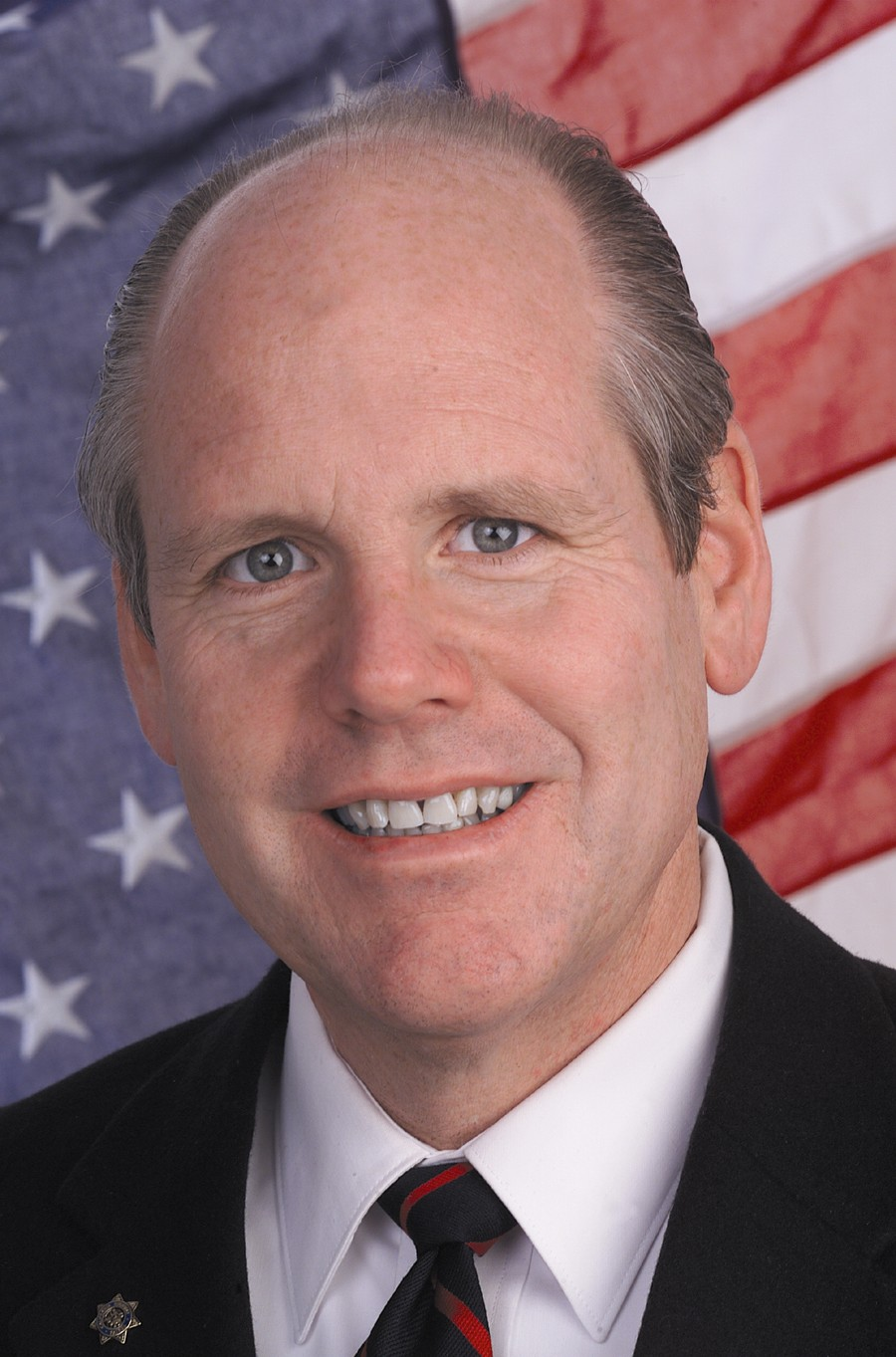
- Official portrait, 2008

Member of the California Senate from the 37th district
- In office December 1, 2008 – November 30, 2009
- Preceded by: Jim Battin
- Succeeded by: Bill Emmerson

Member of the California State Assembly from the 64th district
- In office December 2, 2002 – November 30, 2008
- Preceded by: Rod Pacheco
- Succeeded by: Brian Nestande

Personal details
- Born: December 27, 1951 Kankakee, Illinois, US
- Died: December 26, 2016 (aged 64) Bermuda Dunes, California, US
- Party: Republican
- Spouse: Sheryl
- Children: 2
- Education: Riverside Community College; California State University, Los Angeles; FBI National Academy; California State University, San Bernardino

John Joseph Benoit (December 27, 1951 – December 26, 2016) was an American law enforcement officer and politician; serving in the California State Legislature from 2002 to 2009 and the Riverside County Board of Supervisors from 2009 to 2016.

== Personal life, education, and career ==
Born in Kankakee, Illinois, Benoit graduated from Notre Dame High School in Riverside, California, and went on to earn an Associate degree at Riverside Community College in 1974. In 1978, he earned a Bachelor's degree from California State University, Los Angeles, and in 1986 he graduated from the FBI National Academy. Benoit earned a Master of Public Administration from California State University, San Bernardino, in 1993.

Benoit's law enforcement career spanned 31 years including two years with the Corona, California Police Department, and twenty-nine years with the California Highway Patrol. Benoit served as a member of the Desert Sands Unified School Board from 1999 to 2002. From 2002 to 2008 Benoit served as a Republican Party representative in the California State Assembly, and then served in the California State Senate in 2009. Benoit resigned from the California Senate on November 30, 2009, to serve on the Riverside County Board of Supervisors where he served from 2009 until his death in 2016.

Benoit died at his home in Bermuda Dunes, California, from pancreatic cancer.

California Assembly
Preceded by Rod Pacheco	California State Assemblyman, 64th district December 2, 2002 – November 30, 2008	Succeeded by Brian Nestande
California Senate
Preceded by Jim Battin	California State Senator, 37th district December 1, 2008 – November 30, 2009	Succeeded by Bill Emmerson
