= Rod Pacheco =

American politician

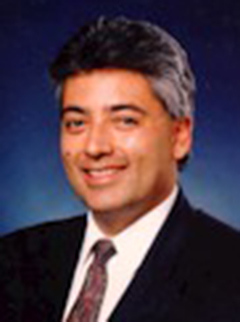
- Official portrait, 2000

District Attorney of Riverside County
- In office 2007–2011
- Preceded by: Grover Trask II
- Succeeded by: Paul Zellerbach

Minority Leader of the California Assembly
- In office November 5, 1998 – April 6, 1999
- Preceded by: Bill Leonard
- Succeeded by: Scott Baugh

Member of the California State Assembly from the 64th district
- In office December 2, 1996 – November 30, 2002
- Preceded by: Ted Weggeland
- Succeeded by: John J. Benoit

Personal details
- Born: Rodric Anthony Pacheco; May 7, 1958 (age 68) Los Angeles, California, United States
- Party: Republican
- Spouse: Rebecca Pacheco
- Children: 4
- Education: University of California, Riverside; University of San Diego Law School

Rodric Anthony Pacheco (born May 7, 1958), more commonly known as Rod Pacheco, is an American politician, formerly a District Attorney from 2007 to 2011 in Riverside County, California.

He served in the California State Assembly from 1996 to 2002, and as Republican leader from 1998 to 1999. Pacheco was defeated on June 8, 2010, in his bid for a second term as Riverside County District Attorney.

== Education ==
In 1976 Pacheco graduated from Aquinas High School in San Bernardino, California. He received his Bachelor of Arts in Political Science and Sociology from the University of California, Riverside in 1980. He received his Juris Doctor degree from the University of San Diego School of Law in 1983.

== Career ==
=== Prosecution career ===
Pacheco began working for the Riverside County District Attorney's Office in 1984.

=== Assembly career ===
Pacheco ran for the California State Assembly in 1996. With his victory, he became the first Latino Republican elected in more than a century, and was elected Leader of the Republican caucus, the first time in the state's history that a Latino served in that capacity.

=== Return to District Attorney's Office ===
In 2002, Pacheco concluded his legislative service and returned to the Riverside County District Attorney's Office as a Chief Deputy District Attorney. In 2003, he was promoted to Assistant District Attorney for the Western Division.

In 2006, Pacheco was elected the Riverside County District Attorney without any opposition. He was sworn in as District Attorney on the steps of Riverside County's Historic Courthouse by California Supreme Court Chief Justice Ronald M. George.

=== Private law practice ===
Pacheco was defeated on June 8, 2010, in his bid for reelection as District Attorney by Riverside County Superior Court Judge Paul Zellerbach. After the election, Pacheco said in a statement to the Press Enterprise, "It has been my honor to serve the citizens of Riverside County in a variety of capacities for many years. I look forward to my entrance into private life."

Party political offices
Preceded by Bill Leonard	Minority Leader of the California State Assembly; November 5, 1998 – April 6, 1999	Succeeded by Scott Baugh
California Assembly
Preceded by Ted Weggeland	California State Assemblyman; 64th District; December 2, 1996 – November 30, 2002	Succeeded by John J. Benoit
