= Frank Fat's =

Coordinates: 38°34′42.96″N 121°29′48.48″W

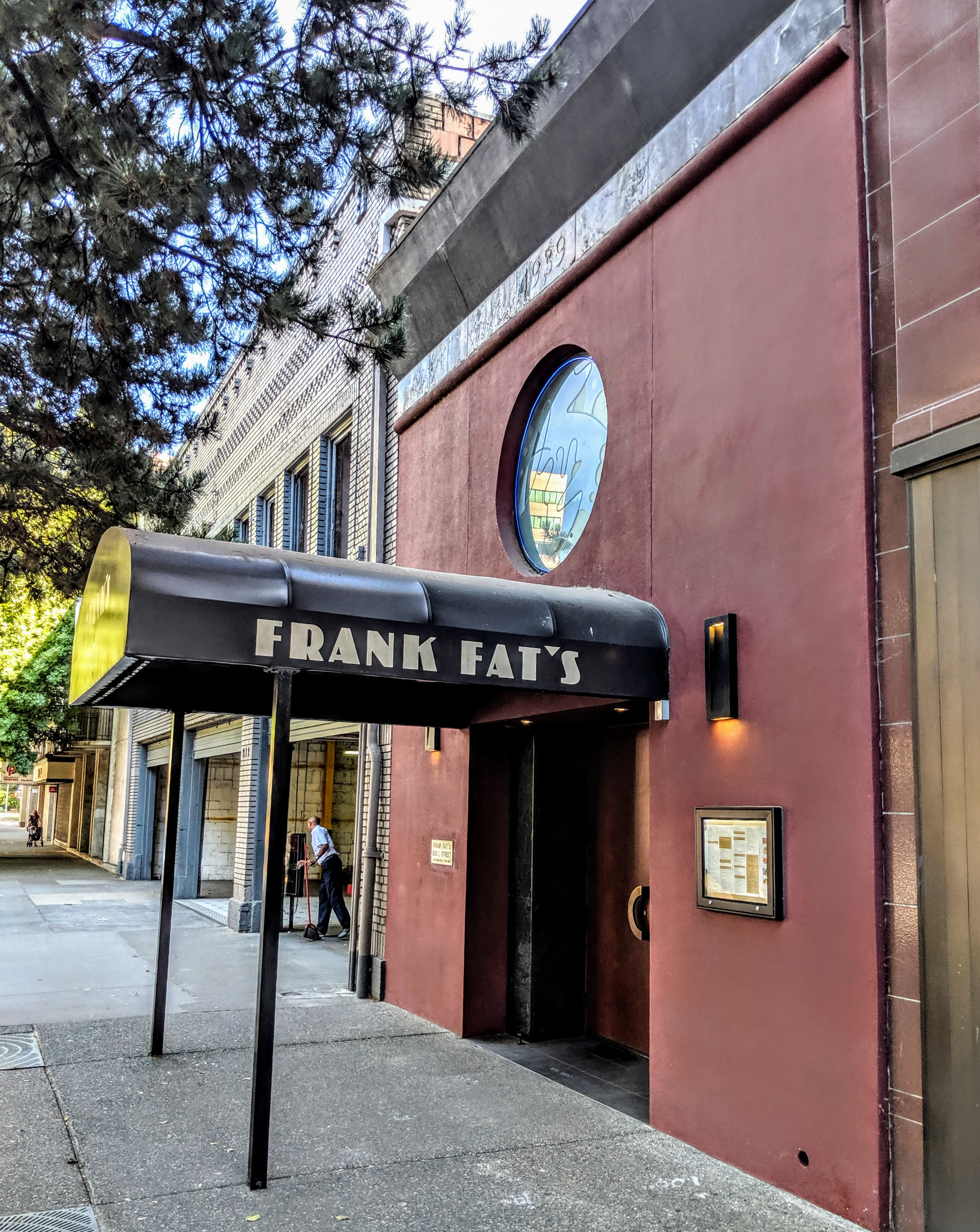
- Interactive map of Frank Fat's

Restaurant information
- Established: 1939; 87 years ago
- Owner: Jerry Fat
- Food type: American Chinese
- Location: Sacramento, California
- Other information: Price range: Moderate
- Website: Official website

Frank Fat's is an American Chinese cuisine restaurant in Sacramento, California founded in 1939 by a Chinese immigrant who called himself "Frank Fat" and who came to the United States illegally in 1919. The original restaurant is one of four now owned by the Fat family.

Frank Fat's celebrated its 80th anniversary in 2019 and is the oldest restaurant still operating in Sacramento. The restaurant has a long-standing reputation as a place where influential California politicians come to drink, dine and negotiate with lobbyists in private, and it also serves a well-known banana cream pie. The restaurant has won two major culinary awards.

== History ==
Dong Sai-Fat was born near Canton in 1904 and used falsified documents to come to San Francisco in 1919, evading the race-based Chinese Exclusion Act, which was later repealed. He was a paper son with a created identity of Wong Bing Yuen, supposedly the son of a U.S. citizen who had returned to China.

A member of China's Taishanese ethnic group, he arrived at the Angel Island Immigration Station in San Francisco Bay. He took Frank Fat as his American name.

Initially, he worked at his uncle's Sacramento restaurant, Hong King Lum, in laundries and orchards in the Midwest. In 1924, he returned to China where he entered into an arranged marriage with Yee Lai-Ching (Mary Fat), and they had a child in 1926. In those years, he spent time with a wealthy cousin who was active in the Kuomintang political party and taught him about the influence of money in politics. After the death of that cousin, Frank Fat returned to the United States without his wife and child, and ten years of hard work passed before he was able to afford to bring his family to California. He and his wife then had five more children, and he returned to work at his uncle's Sacramento restaurant.

After 20 years of labor throughout the United States and China, he still worked as a waiter at his uncle's restaurant when a state official won $900 playing keno but left before collecting his prize. Fat protected the winning ticket for weeks until the man returned and received his money. In appreciation for his honesty, the man agreed in 1939 to help Fat finance his restaurant just two blocks from the California State Capitol building.

In the restaurant's early years, Frank and Mary Fat and their children raised chickens and grew corn, bok choy, gai lan, bitter melon and squashes on an acre of land a few miles away. The restaurant was called Frank's 806 back then, because of the prominence of the street number on its neon sign.

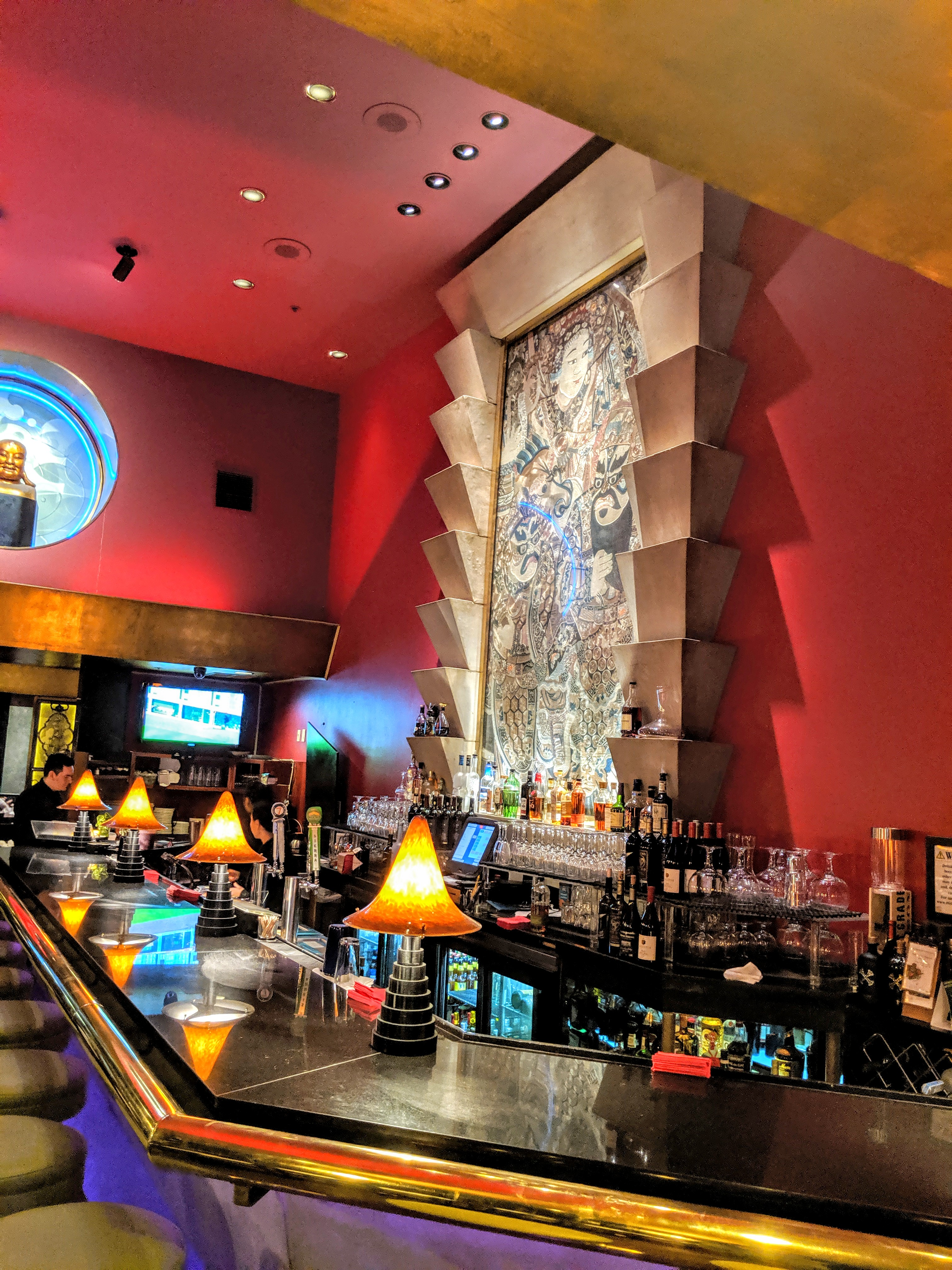
Full bar

Frank Fat's soon became popular with state legislators and lobbyists because of its location close to the capital building and its growing reputation for good food, excellent service, and privacy. Every California governor has been a customer since the restaurant opened. Former governor Earl Warren, later Chief Justice of the United States Supreme Court, was a regular customer for many years, and had a personal friendship with Fat. Former governor Jerry Brown has also been a customer for over 40 years, and attended the restaurant's 80th birthday party.

As the years passed, Frank and Mary Fat became increasingly involved with civic affairs and political activism in support of Chinese-American interests. Mary supported the Chinese Consolidated Benevolent Association and Frank backed education and lobbying efforts.

In 1987, legislative leaders Willie Brown and Bill Lockyer negotiated a five-year compromise deal on tort reform at Frank Fat's, with representatives of a wide variety of interest groups. All the stakeholders signed off on one of the restaurant's linen napkins.

Frank Fat died in 1997 and Mary Fat died in 1999. When Frank Fat died, U. S. Supreme Court Justice Anthony Kennedy, a Sacramento native, wrote, "There was a grace and dignity and decency in the man that I sensed even as a child . . . There was stability, too, from the confidence and humanity he used to bridge time and generations and arch two civilizations." Their restaurants are still family owned and operated.

As a result of lobbying reform, stricter enforcement of alcohol laws, and competition from a thriving Sacramento restaurant scene, the clientele has shifted in the 21st century from politicians and lobbyists to a more general dining audience.

The restaurant's 80th-anniversary celebration was attended by former governor Jerry Brown, former Speaker of the California State Assembly Willie Brown and former California state legislator and U.S. Congressman John Burton.

== Cuisine ==
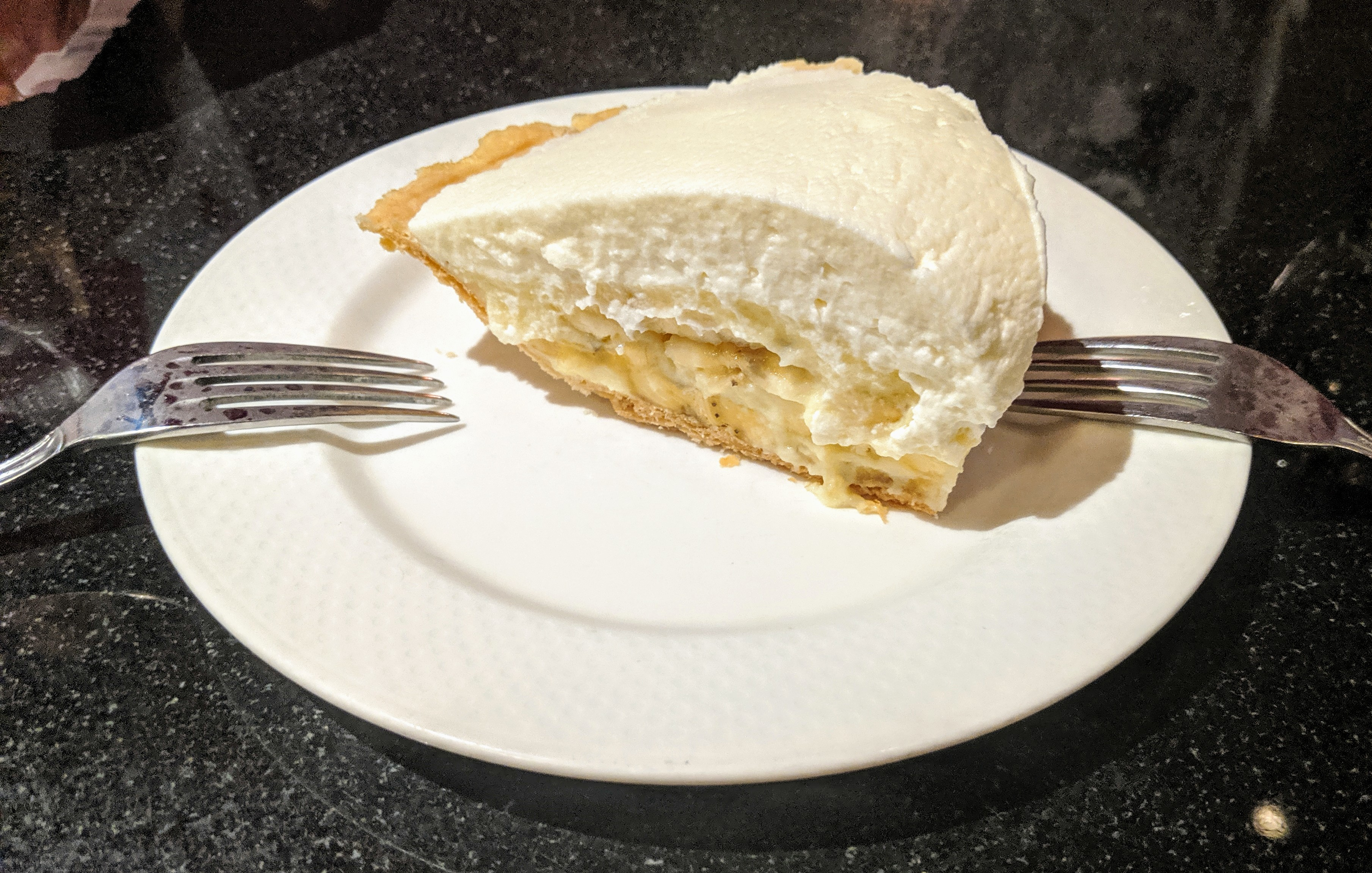
Frank Fat's banana cream pie

An early photo of Frank Fat in front of his restaurant shows that his signs promoted chop suey most prominently, but also advertised American food and cocktails, and private booths. Several varieties of chow mein and chow fun are still on the menu.

A New York strip steak has been on the menu since the early years. Honey walnut prawns is another long-standing dish. Another popular dish for decades has been Peking duck. Eater in San Francisco wrote, "the original Fat's is one of the few places around you can find deep-fried Peking duck, with crispy golden-brown skin giving way to juicy, richly-fatted meat underneath. The duck comes fully deboned and served on a platter alongside shredded scallions, house-made hoisin sauce, and freshly steamed buns that allow you to form your own bao at the table."

Banana cream pie, not a Chinese dish, is a very popular menu item. Banana cream pie has been on the menu since the 1940s and Frank Fat's version is "arguably Sacramento's most famous dessert."

== Awards ==
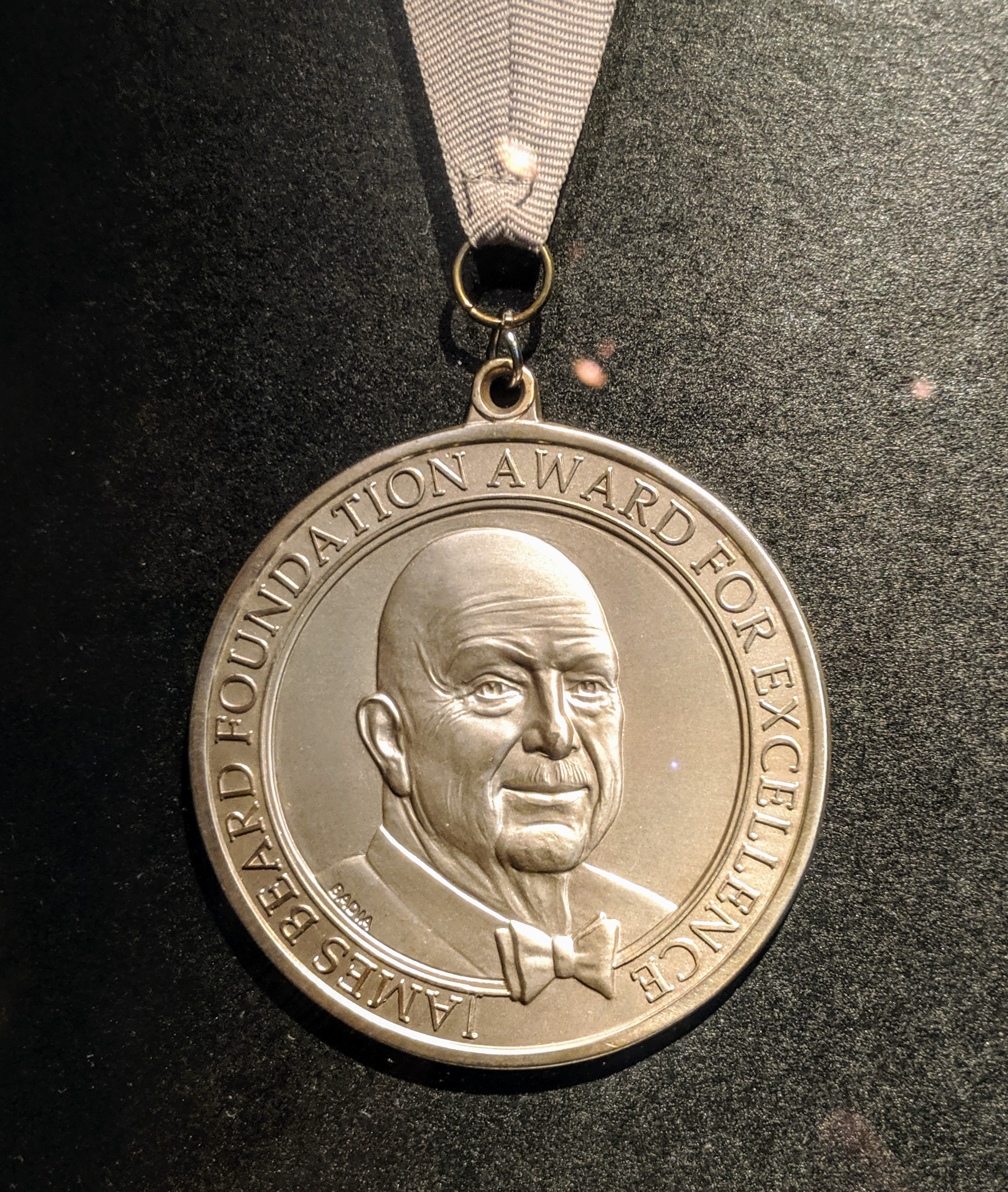
James Beard Foundation Award for Excellence medallion on display at Frank Fat's

Frank Fat's is a 2013 winner of a James Beard Foundation Award for Excellence as an American Classic. The Beard Foundation wrote, "Frank Fat's is a political landmark in California, once known as the 'Third House' and one of Sacramento's oldest restaurants. It serves Chinese-American food and is renowned for honey-walnut prawns; Frank's-style New York steak (grilled, sliced, and smothered in sautéed onions and oyster sauce); Fat's brandy fried chicken; and banana cream pie."

The restaurant also won a Michelin Bib Gourmand award in 2019. The Michelin Guide said, "Celebrated as the 'third house' because of its popularity among politicians making deals in the back booths, this venerable Chinese-American jewel has been family-owned since 1939. Step inside and you'll be transported into another era by way of a retro bar serving up happy-hour martinis and an elegant dining room attended to by tie-wearing servers and festooned with valuable relics. The menu is as much of a throwback as the décor, with yu kwok (crispy beef, pork and water chestnut dumplings) sharing equal billing with their not-so-Chinese items, including banana cream pie."

== See also ==
- List of Chinese restaurants
