= Mike Gipson =

American politician (born 1966)

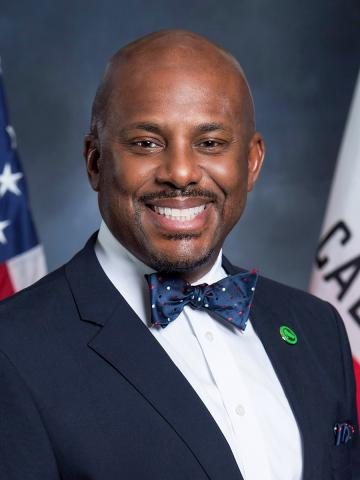

Member-elect of the California State Board of Equalization from the 3rd district
- Assuming office January 4, 2027
- Succeeding: Tony Vazquez

Member of the California State Assembly
- Incumbent
- Assumed office December 1, 2014
- Preceded by: Isadore Hall III
- Succeeded by: Ayanna Davis (elect)
- Constituency: 64th district (2014–2022); 65th district (2022–present)

Personal details
- Born: Mike Anthony Gipson; June 25, 1966 (age 60) Los Angeles, California, U.S.
- Party: Democratic
- Spouse: La Cresha
- Children: 2
- Education: Los Angeles Southwest College (attended); University of Phoenix (BA)

Mike Anthony Gipson (born June 25, 1966) is an American politician currently serving in the California State Assembly. He is a Democrat representing the 65th Assembly District, which encompasses portions of the South Bay region of Los Angeles County, including Compton, Carson, Willowbrook, and the Watts neighborhood of Los Angeles.

Gipson is a member of the California Legislative Black Caucus. Prior to being elected to the Assembly in 2014, he was served on the Carson City Council.

== Electoral history ==
2014 California State Assembly 64th district election
Primary election
Party	Candidate	Votes	%
Democratic	Mike Gipson	11,975	51.0
Democratic	Prophet La'Omar Walker	5,022	21.4
Democratic	Steve Neal	3,580	15.2
Democratic	Micah Ali	2,923	12.4
Total votes		23,500	100.0
General election
Democratic	Mike Gipson	30,041	63.6
Democratic	Prophet La'Omar Walker	17,217	36.4
Total votes		47,258	100.0
Democratic hold			

2016 California State Assembly 64th district election
Primary election
Party	Candidate	Votes	%
Democratic	Mike Gipson (incumbent)	46,186	76.5
Republican	Theresa Sanford	14,179	23.5
Total votes		60,365	100.0
General election
Democratic	Mike Gipson (incumbent)	86,419	73.4
Republican	Theresa Sanford	31,300	26.6
Total votes		117,719	100.0
Democratic hold			

2018 California State Assembly 64th district election
Primary election
Party	Candidate	Votes	%
Democratic	Mike Gipson (incumbent)	29,422	100.0
Republican	Theresa Sanford (write-in)	9	0.0
Total votes		29,431	100.0
General election
Democratic	Mike Gipson (incumbent)	83,210	84.7
Republican	Theresa Sanford	15,010	15.3
Total votes		98,220	100.0
Democratic hold			

2020 California State Assembly 64th district election
Primary election
Party	Candidate	Votes	%
Democratic	Mike Gipson (incumbent)	38,324	67.5
Democratic	Fatima S. Iqbal-Zubair	18,469	32.5
Total votes		56,793	100.0
General election
Democratic	Mike Gipson (incumbent)	83,559	59.5
Democratic	Fatima S. Iqbal-Zubair	56,875	40.5
Total votes		140,434	100.0
Democratic hold			

2022 California State Assembly 65th district election
Primary election
Party	Candidate	Votes	%
Democratic	Mike Gipson (incumbent)	28,801	68.0
Democratic	Fatima Iqbal-Zubair	13,162	31.1
Republican	Lydia Gutierrez (write-in)	414	1.0
Total votes		42,377	100.0
General election
Democratic	Mike Gipson (incumbent)	43,118	61.7
Democratic	Fatima Iqbal-Zubair	26,719	38.3
Total votes		69,837	100.0
Democratic hold			

2024 California State Assembly 65th district election
Primary election
Party	Candidate	Votes	%
Democratic	Mike Gipson (incumbent)	38,702	99.6
Republican	Lydia Gutierrez (write-in)	152	0.4
Total votes		38,854	100.0
General election
Democratic	Mike Gipson (incumbent)	92,246	70.9
Republican	Lydia Gutierrez	37,946	29.1
Total votes		130,192	100.0
Democratic hold			
