= M. David Stirling =

American politician

David Stirling

Member of the California State Assembly from the 64th district
- In office December 6, 1976 – November 30, 1982
- Preceded by: William Campbell
- Succeeded by: Ross Johnson

Personal details
- Born: September 27, 1940 (age 85) New Orleans, Louisiana, US
- Party: Republican
- Children: 3
- Education: Principia College; Tulane University

M. David Stirling (born September 27, 1940) is a Republican politician, lawyer, and author. He served in the California State Assembly representing Los Angeles County from 1976 until 1982. He was also the unsuccessful Republican party nominee for California Attorney General in 1998, losing to Democrat Bill Lockyer.

== Early life and education ==
Stirling is a native of Morgan City, Louisiana. In 1962, he received his undergraduate degree from Principia College in Elsah, Illinois. He excelled in track and football at Principia and even received offers to try out for the San Diego Chargers and the Chicago Bears of the National Football League. Well known as an excellent writer, in his senior year he was on the Dean's List. He opted against a football career and instead, in 1965, received his law degree from Tulane University in New Orleans.

== Assembly terms ==
Stirling served in the Assembly from 1976 until 1982 representing the southeast portion of Los Angeles County including Whittier, Hacienda Heights and Diamond Bar. During his tenure, he was primarily focused on criminal justice and issues relating to public safety. In 1982, he stepped down to run for California Attorney General; however, he lost in the primary to George Nicholson who at the time was a special assistant Attorney General.

== Post Assembly career ==
Stirling began a six-year career as the general counsel for the State Agricultural Labor Relations Board in the Deukmejian Administration. He also spent just over a year as a superior court judge in Sacramento County. After the election of Dan Lungren as Attorney General in 1990, Stirling resigned from the court to become the Chief Deputy Attorney General, the second ranking position in the California Department of Justice. He held the post for eight years.

== Second bid for Attorney General ==
Stirling made a second bid for Attorney General in 1998. In the primary he faced Mike Capizzi, the Orange County District Attorney. Stirling won 66% of the vote to his opponent's 34%. In the general election, he faced then State Senate President Pro Tem Bill Lockyer. In the general election, Stirling obtained 42% of the vote to Lockyer's 52% of the vote. Stirling's vote count was the highest of any non-incumbent Republican in this statewide election.

== Post political career ==
Thirty two days after leaving the Attorney General's office, Stirling became the vice president of the Pacific Legal Foundation.

== Succession Boxes ==
Political offices
Preceded by William Campbell	California's 64th State Assembly district December 6, 1976 – November 30, 1982	Succeeded by Ross Johnson
