= Isadore Hall III =

American politician (born 1971)

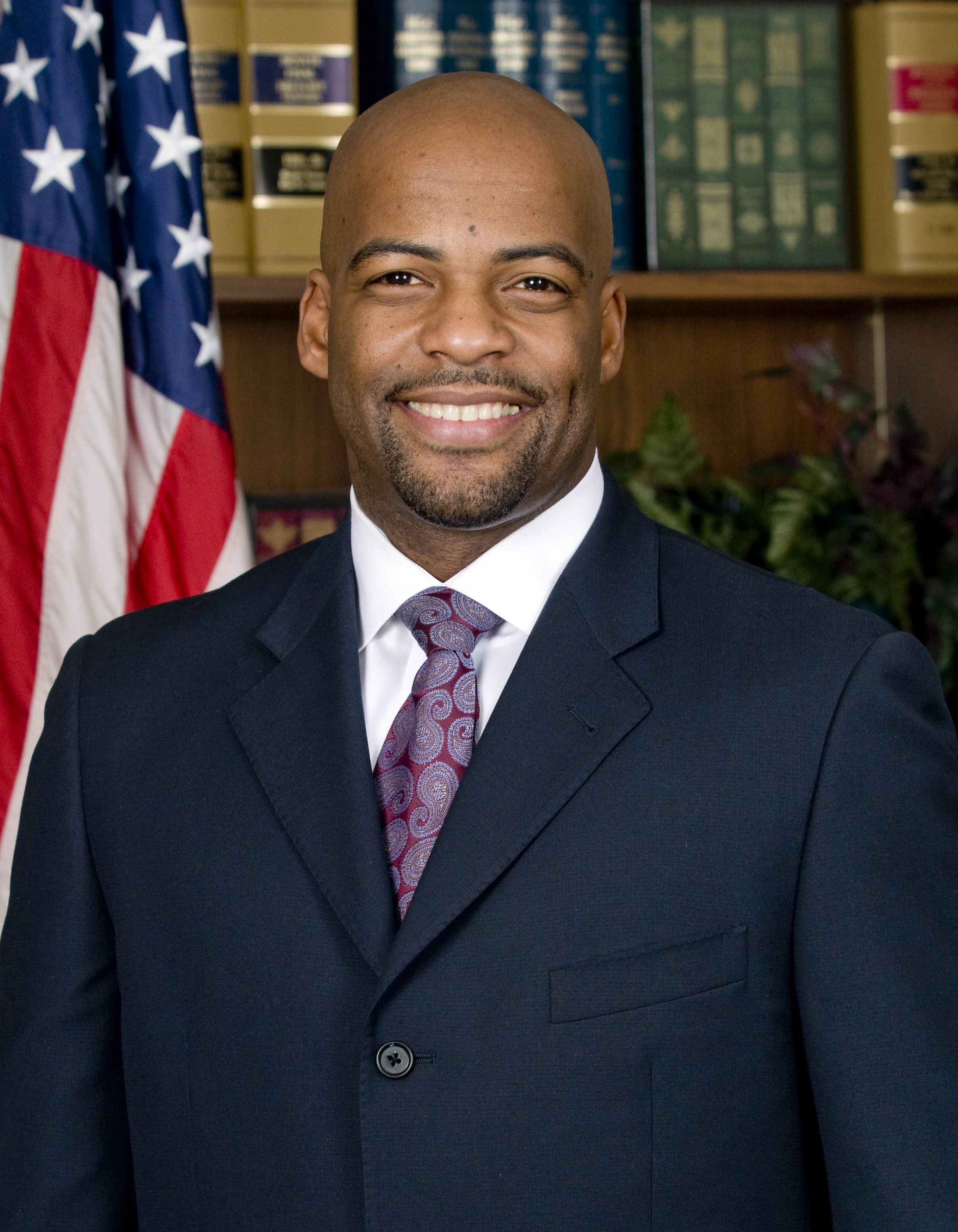
- Official portrait, 2008

Member of the California State Senate from the 35th district
- In office December 10, 2014 – November 30, 2016
- Preceded by: Rod Wright
- Succeeded by: Steven Bradford

Member of the California State Assembly
- In office December 1, 2008 – November 30, 2014
- Preceded by: Mervyn Dymally
- Succeeded by: Mike Gipson
- Constituency: 52nd district (2008–2012); 64th district (2012–2014)

Personal details
- Born: December 10, 1971 (age 54) Compton, California, U.S.
- Party: Democratic
- Education: University of Phoenix; National University; University of Southern California; Next Dimension Bible College
- Occupation: Politician

Isadore Hall III (born December 10, 1971) is an American politician and a former member of the California State Senate. He is a Democrat who represented the 35th district, encompassing parts of the South Bay. Prior to being elected to the state senate, he was the Assemblymember for the 64th district and a Compton city councilman.

He currently sits on the California Agricultural Labor Relations Board (ALRB), after being appointed by Governor Jerry Brown in 2017.

== Compton School Board and City Council ==
Hall began his career of public service in 2001 when he was elected to the Compton Unified School District Board of Trustees. Hall served two terms as President of the Board and oversaw important reforms to attract highly qualified teachers and increase funding to classrooms throughout the district.

In 2003, Hall was elected to the Compton City Council where he served in various leadership positions including Mayor Pro Tem. While on the City Council, Hall oversaw efforts to increase youth access to parks and recreational activities, reduce crime and promote business growth throughout the city. During this time Hall also served on the Metropolitan Water District Board, the Gateway Cities Council of Governments and the Southern California Association of Governments becoming a prominent regional voice for communities throughout southern California.

== State Assembly and Senate ==
Hall served as the Chair of the Assembly Governmental Organization Committee. Hall also served on Appropriations, Elections and Redistricting and Human Services.

During his tenure in the Assembly, Hall authored notable legislation and has been an influential and decisive voice on various public policy issues including: addressing the state’s fiscal crisis, job creation, reducing childhood obesity and diabetes, improving public safety, expanding access to education technology and the creation of a sustainable statewide water policy.

In 2014, Hall was elected to fill a vacancy in the State Senate.

== 2016 Congressional bid ==
In 2015, Hall announced he would not seek a full term in the State Senate in 2016, in order to run for Congress in California's 44th congressional district. The incumbent, Democrat Janice Hahn, did not seek re-election, running instead for the Los Angeles County Board of Supervisors; Hahn endorsed Hall, but he was defeated by Hermosa Beach City Councilwoman Nanette Barragán.

== 2026 Los Angeles Controller bid ==
In September 2025, Hall announced a run for Los Angeles City Controller, challenging incumbent Kenneth Mejia. Hall argued that Mejia's office was poorly managed and lacks good communication with city department heads and other local leaders. Hall dropped out of the race.

== Personal life ==
Hall received a Bachelor of Arts Degree in Business Administration from the University of Phoenix and a Master of Arts Degree in Public Administration from National University. In 2011, Hall was awarded a master's degree in Management and Leadership from the University of Southern California, and dual Doctorates in Theology and Religious Studies from Next Dimension Bible College. Hall is a member of Omega Psi Phi fraternity.

Born and raised in Compton, California, Hall is the youngest of six children.
