= 1982 California Attorney General election =

- November 2, 1982

Nominee	John Van de Kamp	George Nicholson
Party	Democratic	Republican
Popular vote	4,015,953	3,141,996
Percentage	52.8%	41.3%
- County results Van de Kamp: 40–50% 50–60% 60–70% Nicholson: 40-50% 50–60% 60–70%
Attorney General before election
George Deukmejian
Republican
Elected Attorney General
John Van de Kamp
Democratic

The 1982 California Attorney General election was held on November 2, 1982. Democratic nominee John Van de Kamp defeated Republican nominee George Nicholson with 52.83% of the vote.

== Primary elections ==
Primary elections were held on June 8, 1982.

=== Democratic primary ===
==== Candidates ====
- John Van de Kamp, former Los Angeles County District Attorney
- Omer Rains, State Senator

==== Results ====
Democratic primary results
Party	Candidate	Votes	%
Democratic	John Van de Kamp	1,579,838	62.68
Democratic	Omer Rains	940,786	37.32
Total votes		2,520,624	100.00

=== Republican primary ===
==== Candidates ====
- George Nicholson, attorney
- M. David Stirling, State Assemblyman

==== Results ====
Republican primary results
Party	Candidate	Votes	%
Republican	George Nicholson	1,272,789	67.25
Republican	M. David Stirling	619,876	32.75
Total votes		1,892,665	100.00

== General election ==
=== Candidates ===
Major party candidates

- John Van de Kamp, Democratic
- George Nicholson, Republican

Other candidates

- Bartholomew "Bert" Lee, Libertarian
- Dan Siegel, Peace and Freedom

=== Results ===
1982 California Attorney General election
Party	Candidate	Votes	%	±%
Democratic	John Van de Kamp	4,015,953	52.83%	
Republican	George Nicholson	3,141,996	41.33%	
Libertarian	Bartholomew "Bert" Lee	265,029	3.49%	
Peace and Freedom	Dan Siegel	179,055	2.36%	
Majority		873,957		
Turnout		7,602,033		
Democratic gain from Republican		Swing		
