= Lynn Schenk =

American politician (born 1945)

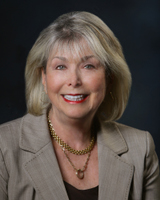

Member of the U.S. House of Representatives from California's 49th district
- In office January 3, 1993 – January 3, 1995
- Preceded by: Constituency established
- Succeeded by: Brian Bilbray

Secretary of the California Business, Transportation and Housing Agency
- In office 1980–1983
- Governor: Jerry Brown
- Preceded by: Alan Stein
- Succeeded by: Kirk West

Personal details
- Born: Lynn Alice Schenk; January 5, 1945 (age 81) New York City, New York, U.S.
- Party: Democratic
- Spouse: Hugh Friedman (m. 1972; died 2013)
- Education: University of California, Los Angeles (BA); University of San Diego (JD); London School of Economics

Lynn Alice Schenk (born January 5, 1945) is an American politician and lawyer from California. A Democrat, she served one term in the United States House of Representatives from 1993 to 1995.

== Biography ==
Schenk was born in 1945, in the Bronx, the daughter of a Holocaust survivor. She attended public schools in the Bronx and Los Angeles, and graduated from Hamilton High School. She received her B.A. from U.C.L.A. in 1967 and her J.D. from the University of San Diego School of Law in 1970. There were only three other women in her law class. Schenk did post-graduate study in international law at the London School of Economics.

In 1971, with two other female lawyers, Schenk broke the gender barrier at The Grant Grill in the downtown San Diego U. S. Grant Hotel. Women were prohibited during lunch, so a male friend made a reservation and the three women went in to eat, unescorted. They ordered mock turtle soup, a specialty not available in the hotel's other restaurants.

After trying to push them out the door, the staff seated them. The three continued to come back until a "No women before 3 p.m." sign was removed. The next year, she and other women formed the Lawyers Club of San Diego, which worked for passage of the Equal Rights Amendment and on other women's rights issues.

=== Politics ===
Schenk worked as a White House Fellow, under Vice Presidents Nelson A. Rockefeller and Walter Mondale, as a deputy attorney general in the office of the California Attorney General, and as an attorney for San Diego Gas and Electric. California Governor Jerry Brown appointed her deputy secretary, and later secretary, of the California Business, Transportation and Housing Agency from 1977 until 1983. After Brown decided not to run for a third term, she returned to private practice.

In 1984, she ran against Republican Susan Golding for San Diego County Supervisor. Late in the race, Golding's campaign allegedly mailed out a piece of literature accusing Schenk of financial irregularities. Schenk lost 45% to 55%. She later sued Golding for slander and won $150,000.

In 1992, Schenk won the Democratic nomination to run for Congress from California's 49th congressional district, covering most of San Diego. Redistricting after the 1990 U.S. census had created an open seat in much of an area previously represented by six-term Republican incumbent Bill Lowery. Schenk won, becoming the first Democrat to represent the area in 40 years. She was defeated for reelection in 1994 by Brian Bilbray, the Republican mayor of Imperial Beach.

=== After Congress ===
After serving in Congress, Schenk ran unsuccessfully for Attorney General of California in 1998. Schenk served in various positions in the California state government under California Governor Gray Davis, including Chief of Staff, from 1998 until Davis was recalled in 2003. As Chief of Staff, she didn't "suffer fools" and was responsible for much of the "centrist" policy of the Davis Administration.

Currently, Schenk practices corporate law. She sits on the boards of various organizations including The Scripps Research Institute Board of Trustees, and the California High-Speed Rail Authority

She remains active in California and national politics.

=== Personal life ===
Schenk was married to University of San Diego law professor C. Hugh Friedman, who died on January 29, 2013. Schenk lives in San Diego.

Schenk has served on the board of the California High Speed Rail Authority since 2003 when she was appointed by Gov. Gray Davis. She serves as Vice Chairperson in 2011.

Lynn Schenk was nominated and inducted into the Women's Hall of Fame in 2012 for the title of Trailblazer, meaning, women who have paved the way for other women, or were the first in their field. The annual Women's Hall of Fame induction is co-hosted by Women's Museum of California (Located in San Diego), Commission on the Status of Women, UC San Diego Women's Center, and San Diego State Women's Studies.

== Honor ==
Lynn Schenk was nominated and inducted into the San Diego County Women's Hall of Fame in 2012 by the Women's Museum of California, Commission on the Status of Women, University of California San Diego Women's Center, and San Diego State University Women's Studies.

== See also ==
- List of Jewish members of the United States Congress
- Women in the United States House of Representatives

U.S. House of Representatives
New constituency	Member of the U.S. House of Representatives from California's 49th congressional district 1993–1995	Succeeded by Brian Bilbray
U.S. order of precedence (ceremonial)
Preceded by Michael Huffington as Former U.S. Representative	Order of precedence of the United States as Former U.S. Representative	Succeeded by Walter Tucker III as Former U.S. Representative
