= 2002 California Courts of Appeal election =

The 2002 California Courts of Appeal election was held November 5, 2002. In this election, voters decided whether to retain or reject sitting judges of the California Courts of Appeal. All judges on the ballot were retained.

== Results ==
Final results from the California Secretary of State:

=== District 1 ===
==== Division 1 ====
Presiding Justice James J. Marchiano
Vote on retention	Votes	%
Yes	663,597	76.10%
No	209,045	23.90%
Invalid or blank votes	615,848	41.37%
Totals	1,488,490	100.00%
Voter turnout	%	

Associate Justice William D. Stein
Vote on retention	Votes	%
Yes	644,297	74.60%
No	219,388	25.40%
Invalid or blank votes	624,805	41.98%
Totals	1,488,490	100.00%
Voter turnout	%	

Associate Justice Sandra Margulies
Vote on retention	Votes	%
Yes	683,972	77.30%
No	201,261	22.70%
Invalid or blank votes	603,257	40.53%
Totals	1,488,490	100.00%
Voter turnout	%	

==== Division 2 ====
Associate Justice J. Anthony Kline
Vote on retention	Votes	%
Yes	654,552	75.30%
No	215,546	24.70%
Invalid or blank votes	618,392	41.54%
Totals	1,488,490	100.00%
Voter turnout	%	

==== Division 3 ====
Presiding Justice William R. McGuiness
Vote on retention	Votes	%
Yes	657,367	76.60%
No	201,811	23.40%
Invalid or blank votes	629,312	42.28%
Totals	1,488,490	100.00%
Voter turnout	%	

Associate Justice Stuart R. Pollak
Vote on retention	Votes	%
Yes	630,611	73.50%
No	228,350	26.50%
Invalid or blank votes	629,529	42.29%
Totals	1,488,490	100.00%
Voter turnout	%	

Associate Justice Joanne C. Parrilli
Vote on retention	Votes	%
Yes	682,288	78.00%
No	192,741	22.00%
Invalid or blank votes	613,461	41.21%
Totals	1,488,490	100.00%
Voter turnout	%	

==== Division 4 ====
Presiding Justice Laurence D. Kay
Vote on retention	Votes	%
Yes	639,534	74.80%
No	216,448	25.20%
Invalid or blank votes	632,508	42.49%
Totals	1,488,490	100.00%
Voter turnout	%	

Associate Justice Patricia K. Sepulveda
Vote on retention	Votes	%
Yes	670,495	77.20%
No	198,229	22.80%
Invalid or blank votes	619,766	41.64%
Totals	1,488,490	100.00%
Voter turnout	%	

Associate Justice Maria P. Rivera
Vote on retention	Votes	%
Yes	668,285	76.70%
No	203,749	23.30%
Invalid or blank votes	616,456	41.41%
Totals	1,488,490	100.00%
Voter turnout	%	

==== Division 5 ====
Presiding Justice Barbara Jones
Vote on retention	Votes	%
Yes	683,724	78.60%
No	187,130	21.40%
Invalid or blank votes	617,636	41.49%
Totals	1,488,490	100.00%
Voter turnout	%	

Associate Justice Linda M. Gemello
Vote on retention	Votes	%
Yes	660,764	76.50%
No	203,771	23.50%
Invalid or blank votes	623,955	41.92%
Totals	1,488,490	100.00%
Voter turnout	%	

Associate Justice Mark Simons
Vote on retention	Votes	%
Yes	633,549	74.40%
No	218,008	25.60%
Invalid or blank votes	636,933	42.79%
Totals	1,488,490	100.00%
Voter turnout	%	

=== District 2 ===
==== Division 1 ====
Associate Justice Miriam A. Vogel
Vote on retention	Votes	%
Yes	948,720	72.50%
No	360,511	27.50%
Invalid or blank votes	876,117	40.09%
Totals	2,185,348	100.00%
Voter turnout	%	

Associate Justice Robert M. Mallano
Vote on retention	Votes	%
Yes	969,015	73.50%
No	349,902	26.50%
Invalid or blank votes	866,431	39.65%
Totals	2,185,348	100.00%
Voter turnout	%	

==== Division 2 ====
Associate Justice Kathryn Doi Todd
Vote on retention	Votes	%
Yes	927,296	71.10%
No	377,215	28.90%
Invalid or blank votes	880,837	40.31%
Totals	2,185,348	100.00%
Voter turnout	%	

Associate Justice Judith M. Ashmann
Vote on retention	Votes	%
Yes	942,120	72.40%
No	359,563	27.60%
Invalid or blank votes	883,665	40.44%
Totals	2,185,348	100.00%
Voter turnout	%	

==== Division 3 ====
Presiding Justice Joan Dempsey Klein
Vote on retention	Votes	%
Yes	964,401	73.20%
No	354,401	26.80%
Invalid or blank votes	866,546	39.65%
Totals	2,185,348	100.00%
Voter turnout	%	

==== Division 4 ====
Associate Justice Gary Hastings
Vote on retention	Votes	%
Yes	896,728	69.70%
No	390,112	30.30%
Invalid or blank votes	898,508	41.12%
Totals	2,185,348	100.00%
Voter turnout	%	

==== Division 5 ====
Presiding Justice Paul A. Turner
Vote on retention	Votes	%
Yes	898,572	70.00%
No	386,391	30.00%
Invalid or blank votes	900,385	41.20%
Totals	2,185,348	100.00%
Voter turnout	%	

Associate Justice Richard M. Mosk
Vote on retention	Votes	%
Yes	903,730	69.30%
No	400,434	30.70%
Invalid or blank votes	881,184	40.32%
Totals	2,185,348	100.00%
Voter turnout	%	

==== Division 6 ====
Presiding Justice Arthur Gilbert
Vote on retention	Votes	%
Yes	947,926	73.00%
No	352,187	27.00%
Invalid or blank votes	885,235	40.51%
Totals	2,185,348	100.00%
Voter turnout	%	

Associate Justice Steven Z. Perren
Vote on retention	Votes	%
Yes	942,523	72.10%
No	365,233	27.90%
Invalid or blank votes	877,592	40.16%
Totals	2,185,348	100.00%
Voter turnout	%	

Associate Justice Kenneth R. Yegan
Vote on retention	Votes	%
Yes	889,067	69.50%
No	391,366	30.50%
Invalid or blank votes	904,915	41.41%
Totals	2,185,348	100.00%
Voter turnout	%	

==== Division 7 ====
Presiding Justice Mildred L. Lillie
Vote on retention	Votes	%
Yes	914,505	70.40%
No	384,800	29.60%
Invalid or blank votes	886,043	40.54%
Totals	2,185,348	100.00%
Voter turnout	%	

Associate Justice Dennis M. Perluss
Vote on retention	Votes	%
Yes	883,033	69.20%
No	393,855	30.80%
Invalid or blank votes	908,460	41.57%
Totals	2,185,348	100.00%
Voter turnout	%	

==== Division 8 ====
Presiding Justice Candace D. Cooper
Vote on retention	Votes	%
Yes	971,476	74.70%
No	330,069	25.30%
Invalid or blank votes	883,803	40.44%
Totals	2,185,348	100.00%
Voter turnout	%	

Associate Justice Paul Boland
Vote on retention	Votes	%
Yes	918,263	71.40%
No	368,592	28.60%
Invalid or blank votes	898,493	41.11%
Totals	2,185,348	100.00%
Voter turnout	%	

Associate Justice Paul Boland
Vote on retention	Votes	%
Yes	925,228	71.40%
No	371,988	28.60%
Invalid or blank votes	888,132	40.64%
Totals	2,185,348	100.00%
Voter turnout	%	

=== District 3 ===
Presiding Justice Arthur G. Scotland
Vote on retention	Votes	%
Yes	450,795	73.30%
No	164,524	26.70%
Invalid or blank votes	334,856	35.24%
Totals	950,175	100.00%
Voter turnout	%	

Associate Justice Rod Davis
Vote on retention	Votes	%
Yes	440,807	72.40%
No	168,519	27.60%
Invalid or blank votes	340,849	35.87%
Totals	950,175	100.00%
Voter turnout	%	

Associate Justice Vance W. Raye
Vote on retention	Votes	%
Yes	431,224	70.80%
No	173,176	29.20%
Invalid or blank votes	340,333	35.82%
Totals	950,175	100.00%
Voter turnout	%	

Associate Justice Richard Sims
Vote on retention	Votes	%
Yes	440,339	71.90%
No	171,176	28.10%
Invalid or blank votes	336,770	35.44%
Totals	950,175	100.00%
Voter turnout	%	

Associate Justice Ronald B. Robie
Vote on retention	Votes	%
Yes	432,611	70.70%
No	179,640	29.30%
Invalid or blank votes	337,924	35.56%
Totals	950,175	100.00%
Voter turnout	%	

Associate Justice Daniel M. Kolkey
Vote on retention	Votes	%
Yes	427,122	70.60%
No	178,008	29.40%
Invalid or blank votes	345,045	36.31%
Totals	950,175	100.00%
Voter turnout	%	

=== District 4 ===
==== Division 1 ====
Associate Justice James A. McIntyre
Vote on retention	Votes	%
Yes	883,256	73.50%
No	318,664	26.50%
Invalid or blank votes	777,896	36.31%
Totals	1,979,816	100.00%
Voter turnout	%	

Associate Justice Terry B. O'Rourke
Vote on retention	Votes	%
Yes	886,952	73.10%
No	327,927	26.90%
Invalid or blank votes	764,937	39.29%
Totals	1,979,816	100.00%
Voter turnout	%	

Associate Justice Alex C. McDonald
Vote on retention	Votes	%
Yes	883,300	73.20%
No	324,320	26.80%
Invalid or blank votes	772,196	39.00%
Totals	1,979,816	100.00%
Voter turnout	%	

Associate Justice Judith McConnell
Vote on retention	Votes	%
Yes	886,645	72.00%
No	345,814	28.00%
Invalid or blank votes	747,357	37.75%
Totals	1,979,816	100.00%
Voter turnout	%	

Associate Justice Gilbert Nares
Vote on retention	Votes	%
Yes	850,934	70.30%
No	361,078	29.70%
Invalid or blank votes	767,804	38.78%
Totals	1,979,816	100.00%
Voter turnout	%	

==== Division 2 ====
Associate Justice Thomas E. Hollenhorst
Vote on retention	Votes	%
Yes	844,544	70.40%
No	355,996	29.60%
Invalid or blank votes	779,276	39.36%
Totals	1,979,816	100.00%
Voter turnout	%	

==== Division 3 ====
Associate Justice William F. Rylaarsdam
Vote on retention	Votes	%
Yes	823,614	69.30%
No	366,015	30.70%
Invalid or blank votes	790,187	39.91%
Totals	1,979,816	100.00%
Voter turnout	%	

Associate Justice Eileen C. Moore
Vote on retention	Votes	%
Yes	865,832	71.60%
No	343,592	28.40%
Invalid or blank votes	770,392	38.91%
Totals	1,979,816	100.00%
Voter turnout	%	

Associate Justice Richard D. Fybel
Vote on retention	Votes	%
Yes	787,686	66.60%
No	395,917	33.40%
Invalid or blank votes	796,213	40.22%
Totals	1,979,816	100.00%
Voter turnout	%	

Associate Justice Kathleen E. O'Leary
Vote on retention	Votes	%
Yes	886,612	72.50%
No	336,530	27.50%
Invalid or blank votes	756,674	38.22%
Totals	1,979,816	100.00%
Voter turnout	%	

Associate Justice Richard M. Aronson
Vote on retention	Votes	%
Yes	833,047	70.30%
No	353,027	29.70%
Invalid or blank votes	793,742	40.09%
Totals	1,979,816	100.00%
Voter turnout	%	

=== District 5 ===
Associate Justice Dennis A. Cornell
Vote on retention	Votes	%
Yes	308,496	73.30%
No	112,550	26.70%
Invalid or blank votes	156,693	27.12%
Totals	577,739	100.00%
Voter turnout	%	

Associate Justice Nick J. Dibiaso
Vote on retention	Votes	%
Yes	286,755	68.20%
No	133,889	31.80%
Invalid or blank votes	157,095	27.19%
Totals	577,739	100.00%
Voter turnout	%	

Associate Justice Gene M. Gomes
Vote on retention	Votes	%
Yes	298,193	69.80%
No	129,231	30.20%
Invalid or blank votes	150,315	26.02%
Totals	577,739	100.00%
Voter turnout	%	

=== District 6 ===
Associate Justice Patricia Bamattre-Manoukian
Vote on retention	Votes	%
Yes	243,355	76.50%
No	75,117	23.50%
Invalid or blank votes	238,741	42.85%
Totals	567,213	100.00%
Voter turnout	%	

Associate Justice William M. Wunderlich
Vote on retention	Votes	%
Yes	240,027	76.70%
No	73,369	23.30%
Invalid or blank votes	243,817	43.76%
Totals	567,213	100.00%
Voter turnout	%	

Associate Justice Conrad L. Rushing
Vote on retention	Votes	%
Yes	235,834	75.60%
No	76,372	24.40%
Invalid or blank votes	245,007	43.97%
Totals	567,213	100.00%
Voter turnout	%	

Associate Justice Eugene M. Premo
Vote on retention	Votes	%
Yes	237,594	75.80%
No	76,355	24.20%
Invalid or blank votes	243,264	43.66%
Totals	567,213	100.00%
Voter turnout	%	

Associate Justice Franklin D. Elia
Vote on retention	Votes	%
Yes	235,123	75.60%
No	76,138	24.40%
Invalid or blank votes	245,952	44.14%
Totals	567,213	100.00%
Voter turnout	%	
