= Ted Weggeland =

American politician

Member of the California State Assembly from the 64th district
- In office December 7, 1992 – November 30, 1996
- Preceded by: Ross Johnson
- Succeeded by: Rod Pacheco

Personal details
- Born: Edward Mitchell Weggeland; September 30, 1963 (age 62) New Rochelle, New York
- Party: Republican
- Spouse: Jennifer
- Education: University of California, Los Angeles (BA); Pepperdine University (JD)

Edward Mitchell "Ted" Weggeland (born September 30, 1963) is an American lawyer, politician, and owner & principal of hospitality, real estate, and public affairs ventures in California.

== Early life and education ==
Born in New Rochelle, New York, he was raised in Rochester before moving to California midway through high school. He earned his Bachelor of Arts in Political Science from the University of California, Los Angeles and his Juris Doctor from Pepperdine University School of Law.

== Political career ==
He began his political career in college working for a Republican political fundraising firm in Los Angeles. After graduating from law school, he moved to Washington, DC, where he was an associate at a government relations firm representing business interests. After returning to California in 1990, he served as District Representative to Al McCandless, a Republican Congressman.

In 1992, he ran for the California State Assembly, winning one of the closest elections in the state that year. The youngest legislator in the state capitol, he represented approximately 375,000 constituents the 64th Assembly District which included the cities of Riverside, Corona, and Norco, and March Air Force Base, Norco Naval Weapons Station, UC Riverside, Cal Baptist University, La Sierra University, and the California Citrus State Historic Park.

In the Assembly, he served as the Republican Whip—the third ranking position in the caucus—and as chairman of the Committee on Banking and Finance. He also served on the Assembly Committees of Housing and Community Development, Utilities and Commerce, and Transportation.

He authored numerous bills signed into law, including AB 2060, which established a voluntary certification program for hazardous waste environmental technologies which led to the launch of California Environmental Technology Certification Program that won the Ford Foundation's Innovations in American Government Award in 1996; AB 3351, which created the California Department of Financial Institutions, consolidating the regulation of commercial banks, savings associations, and credit unions, and expanded powers for bank investments, acquisitions, trust activities, and enforcement; AB 1482, the California Interstate Banking and Branching Act, which authorized out of state banks to acquire or establish branches in the state under reciprocal conditions, promoting competition and facilitating interstate mergers; AB 1371, a statewide reform of California's Greater Avenues for Independence welfare to work program, which placed greater emphasis on quicker entry into the workforce; and AB 3503, which helped accelerate planning and unified redevelopment of former March Air Force Base property into commercial, industrial, and civil uses, including law enforcement training facilities and joint civil-military airfield operations after March Air Force Base was realigned under BRAC.

After voluntarily retiring from the Assembly to raise his family and build a business career, he was appointed by Governor Pete Wilson to the California Fish & Game Commission, where he served as vice president, and the California Travel & Tourism Commission. He also served on the Bipartisan Commission on the Political Reform Act of 1972.

== Other activities ==
From 1996 to 2012 he served as senior vice president of the Entrepreneurial Corporate Group, where he was involved in real estate development and served as executive vice president and member of the board of directors of the Historic Mission Inn Corporation.

In 2012, he founded the Raincross Corporate Group, which comprises multiple companies involved in real estate development; hospitality management, operations, and consulting; and public affairs.

He co-chaired the 1999 Congressional Medal of Honor Society National Convention, initiated and chaired the effort to build Riverside Aquatics Complex, founded the Riverside Sports Commission, and served on the Board of Directors of USA Water Polo.

He is a long-serving member of the Board of Trustees of the National World War II Museum where he served as chairman from 2022 to 2024.

== Personal life ==
Ted and his wife, Jennifer, live in Southern California. They have three children.
