= Bill Lockyer =

American politician (born 1941)

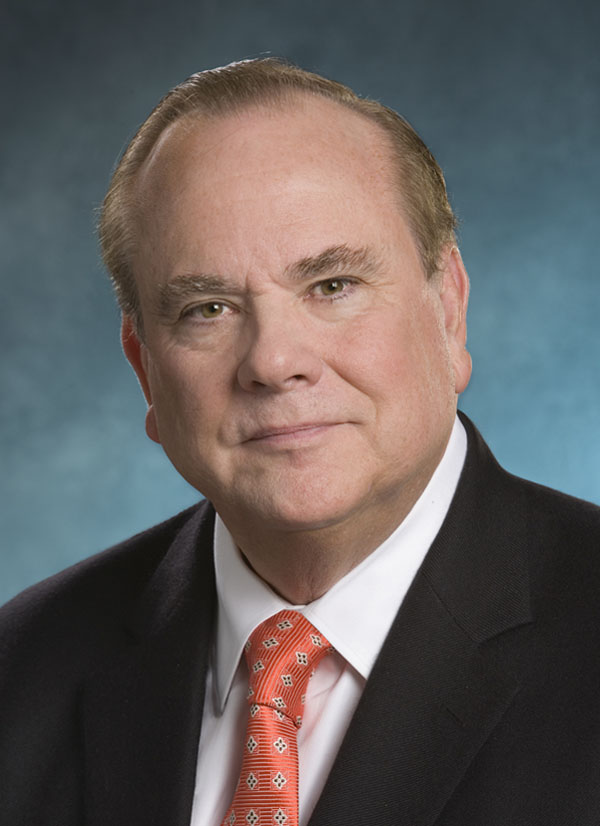
- Official portrait, 2007

32nd Treasurer of California
- In office January 8, 2007 – January 5, 2015
- Governor: Arnold Schwarzenegger; Jerry Brown
- Preceded by: Phil Angelides
- Succeeded by: John Chiang

30th Attorney General of California
- In office January 4, 1999 – January 8, 2007
- Governor: Gray Davis; Arnold Schwarzenegger
- Preceded by: Dan Lungren
- Succeeded by: Jerry Brown

President pro tempore of the California Senate
- In office January 31, 1994 – February 5, 1998
- Preceded by: David Roberti
- Succeeded by: John Burton

Member of the California Senate from the 10th district
- In office December 6, 1982 – November 30, 1998
- Preceded by: Marz Garcia
- Succeeded by: Liz Figueroa

Member of the California State Assembly from the 14th district
- In office September 10, 1973 – November 30, 1982
- Preceded by: Robert Crown
- Succeeded by: Johan Klehs

Personal details
- Born: William Westwood Lockyer; May 8, 1941 (age 85) Hayward, California, U.S.
- Party: Democratic
- Spouse: Nadia Davis (m. 2003)
- Children: 4
- Education: University of California, Berkeley (BA); University of the Pacific (JD)

William Westwood Lockyer (born May 8, 1941) is an American politician and lawyer from the state of California. A Democrat, he served in both houses of the state legislature. He spent the last four years of his State Senate tenure as president pro tempore. He then served as California Attorney General from 1999 to 2007, and as California State Treasurer from 2007 to 2015.

== Early life and education ==
Lockyer was born in Hayward, California, on May 8, 1941. He attended the University of California, Berkeley, graduating with a B.A. in Political Science in 1965. His first job with the California legislature was on the staff of Assemblyman Robert W. Crown. In 1986, Lockyer graduated with a J.D. from University of the Pacific McGeorge School of Law. Lockyer began his own political career as a member of the San Leandro Unified School District school board.

== Legislative career ==
Lockyer first won a State Assembly seat in a special election in 1973, following the accidental death of his political mentor, Bay Area Assemblyman Robert W. Crown. He served in the legislature for the next twenty-five years, more than half of that time in the state senate, where, in 1994, his peers chose him President Pro Tem, the most powerful position in the upper legislative house.

As a legislator, Lockyer won close friends in both political parties, including Jim Brulte, Republican minority leader of the state senate, who would long remember Lockyer's skill at compromise and consensus-building, and Democratic Speaker of the Assembly Willie Brown, who recalled that, by the time Lockyer left the legislature in 1998, "Capitol insiders took his prolific effectiveness for granted."

=== Environmental protection legislation and the Bay Trail ===
Lockyer considered his greatest environmental achievement to be his 1987 bill to create a Bay Trail. which he envisioned as an eventual 500-mile-long hiking and cycling path, a continuous recreational corridor, with adjacent bayshore parks and protected natural habitats, that would entirely encircle San Francisco and San Pablo Bays. Requiring city, county, and regional cooperation, the Bay Trail marked its 20th year in 2009, with 293 miles open to hikers, bicyclists, joggers, and walkers.

=== 1984 "hate crimes" legislation ===
In 1984, Lockyer sponsored the State's first "hate crimes" legislation which, as later amended, provided that "no person...shall by force or threat of force, willfully injure, intimidate, interfere with, oppress, or threaten any other person in the free exercise or enjoyment of any right or privilege secured to him or her by the Constitution or laws of this state or by the Constitution or laws of the United States because of the other person's race, color, religion, ancestry, national origin, disability, gender, or sexual orientation, or because he or she perceives that the other person has one or more of those characteristics." Later, as attorney general, Lockyer coordinated enforcement of this statute with local law enforcement.

=== 1987 tort reform "napkin deal" ===
On September 10, 1987, while Lockyer chaired the State Senate Judiciary Committee, he and Speaker of the Assembly Willie Brown met at Frank Fat's Restaurant in Sacramento with representatives of bitterly competing special interests – insurance companies, trial lawyers, doctors and manufacturers – to formalize their agreement to changes in California's civil liability laws. This compromise had already been worked out; the dinner was meant to ratify a peace pact among all the concerned parties to abide by the compromise. Lockyer, who had acted as mediator during the earlier negotiations, scribbled the terms of the pact on a restaurant cloth napkin, and so ended a political war. The compromise bill was then ramrodded through the assembly and state senate on the last night of that year's legislative session, and was signed into law by Republican governor George Deukmejian.

Though only Lockyer's theatrical touch of writing the agreement on a napkin made it especially memorable, the napkin deal became legendary in the State Capitol. Proudly reproducing the original napkin on a poster titled "Tort-Mania 1987." Lockyer and Brown regarded the special interests compromise and conciliation they had arranged as a great legislative accomplishment. "The public is better served," Lockyer said at the time, "when these groups are trying to mend rather than tear the fabric of society."

=== 1997–98 "Welfare Reform" budget ===
Federal legislation signed by President Clinton in 1996 required all states to enact “welfare-to-work” legislation to help welfare recipients move from government assistance to employment and “self-sufficiency.” The resulting establishment of a new CalWORKs (California Work Opportunity and Responsibility to Kids) program had a major effect on California's budget, propelling difficult negotiations between the Democratic legislature and Republican governor Pete Wilson. As Senate President Pro Tem, Lockyer was a key negotiator in these private negotiations, which, he later recalled to journalist Daniel Weintraub, produced the state's “last... old-fashioned balanced budget.”

== State attorney general ==
Elected attorney general in 1998, Lockyer steered the Justice Department toward a new legal activism that reflected his liberal values in areas such as civil rights, antitrust enforcement, and consumer and environmental protection. He became one of the two most prominent state Attorneys General in the nation, rivaled in media attention only by New York's Eliot Spitzer. The two men were personal rivals as well, once nearly coming to blows after "screaming expletives at each other" at a Los Angeles convention of the National Association of Attorneys General.

As attorney general, Lockyer sometimes had to defend official positions he found objectionable, such as asking the courts, in 2004, to invalidate San Francisco same-sex marriage licenses which conflicted with state law, though he personally supported the right of same-sex marriage which brought him under fire from both social conservatives and gay activists. On other occasions, the positions Lockyer defended matched his own, as when he defended California's 1996 legalization of medical marijuana against federal attacks by the Bush Administration. Lockyer found this particularly satisfying as he had come to strongly support "compassionate use" of Marijuana after living through his mother's and younger sister's deaths from leukemia.

=== Sex offenders and DNA testing ===
In 1996, the state legislature passed California's version of "Megan's Law", which required authorities to make publicly available registration information provided to local police by former child molesters, rapists, and other sex offenders after being released from custody. But the public could only access this information about registered sex offenders living in their communities by visiting a police station or calling a 900 toll-free number, until Lockyer's department, with legislative approval in 2004, launched a public website allowing Internet users, by a simple search, to find personal details about more than 60,000 past sex offenders, and to locate, through an interactive map, such offenders living in their neighborhoods. The website faced initial complaints that, despite the State's efforts to prod local Police to provide accurate data, some of the information was outdated; and that, as the ACLU contended, there were too few restrictions to protect the civil liberties of those who had already completed their sentences. But the website did draw enormous public interest, receiving over 186,000,000 "hits" from more than 16,000,000 individual users in its first year of operation.

Another large-scale bio-tech challenge was expanding State Crime Lab facilities to process DNA samples taken from convicted felons, aiming to create the largest state-run DNA criminal data bank in the country. Since 1988, California law had required blood samples taken from felons convicted of specific sex and violent crimes, in the hope of reinvigorating often “cold” investigations of unsolved crimes. When Lockyer took office, 100,000 of these blood samples sat in cold storage, still waiting to be analyzed and compared to DNA from crime scene evidence. In June 2001, Lockyer announced that with an expanded DNA Lab staff and new equipment, the backlog of unanalyzed blood samples had been eliminated, leading to the identification of suspects in homicide cases more than 15 years old.

But then a voter-approved measure of 2004 that allowed police to gather DNA, not just from convicted violent criminals, but from anyone arrested, even without charge or conviction, for any felony, led Lockyer himself to express reservations. "I personally wouldn't have put arrests in the measure," he said, adding that he would also have made it simpler for innocent people to get their information removed from the files – a complaint of civil libertarians who raised the specter of innocent people being kept in the same database as convicted armed felons. This also proved an administrative nightmare, as the backlog eliminated in 2001 had reappeared as a new backlog of 287,000 by 2006, forcing new efforts, with inadequate financial resources, to meet the television-viewing public's rising expectations of law enforcement efficiency.

=== Enron and prison-rape remark controversy ===
As attorney general, Lockyer, during the Enron scandal of 2001, achieved some notoriety for his public quip, "I would love to personally escort [Enron CEO] Ken Lay to an 8-by-10 cell that he could share with a tattooed dude who says, 'Hi, my name is Spike, honey'". This remark was widely condemned as an endorsement of prison rape.

Lockyer later apologized for the statement in a letter to the Los Angeles Times, saying, "My anger over the activities of energy barons doesn't come close to my lifelong outrage at the crime of rape. ... I guess I let my anger get the better of me in talking about the mercenary corporate executives who are making life so miserable for millions of Californians."

=== Landmark legal cases ===
- Silveira v. Lockyer (Restrictions on semi-automatic firearms)
- Lockyer v. Andrade ("Three-strikes" criminal sentencing)
- Lockyer v. City and County of San Francisco (Same-sex Marriage)

=== 2003 gubernatorial recall election ===
An initiative to recall newly re-elected Governor Gray Davis qualified for the ballot in July 2003, with a special election scheduled for October to include both a referendum on the recall itself and a list of candidates vying to replace Davis if the recall succeeded. With some arm-twisting by U.S. Senator Dianne Feinstein, all the potential Democratic candidates, including Lockyer, agreed not to run, in the hope that this would strengthen Davis' campaign to defeat the recall.

On October 7, California voters recalled Davis by a decisive vote and elected Arnold Schwarzenegger to replace him. Two weeks later, at a UC Berkeley post-mortem conference on the election, Lockyer announced that while he had voted against the recall, he had also voted for Schwarzenegger, the first time he had ever voted for a Republican in a state election. He said that he was "tired of transactional, cynical, deal-making politics," and that, for him, "Arnold represented... hope, change, reform, opportunity, upbeat problem solving." He added, "I hope I haven't been conned." Many fellow Democrats and feminists reacted negatively to Lockyer's surprise announcement.

== State treasurer ==
=== 2006 election ===
Lockyer, barred by term limit laws from seeking a third term as attorney general, considered running for governor in the 2006 election. In January 2005, he tentatively announced his candidacy for governor: "the one and only office that has held abiding interest for me since I left the Legislature ... It's the job I want, not only because I think I'll be a great executive, but because I think that I can and will lead the best campaign you've ever seen, a winning Democratic campaign of ideas, ideals and inspiration to stake out a great future for California." Lockyer changed his mind four months later, saying that he was unwilling "to spend the next 10 years of my life" in the daily "partisan fighting" that plagued governors of both parties. He later announced he would instead run for state treasurer. He was elected to that office in November 2006.

=== Climate change and renewable energy finance initiatives ===
As treasurer, Lockyer tried to use his office's influence to support various environmental causes. These attempts included:

- Expanding the "Green Wave" environmental initiative first proposed by Treasurer Phil Angelides in 2004 to a multibillion-dollar investment in renewable energy.
- With statutory authority of the Treasurer's California Alternative Energy and Advanced Transportation Financing Authority, exempting new "Zero Emission Vehicle" manufacturers, such as electric automobile startup Tesla Motors, from sales and use tax on the purchase of equipment used in California manufacturing.
- State purchase – the first by any governmental body in the US – of "green bonds" issued by the World Bank to finance Climate Change projects in developing countries.
- Providing a $48 million loan guarantee program to help California truckers comply with new diesel emission regulations put into force by the California Air Resources Board.

Lockyer also supported federal legislation introduced in July 2009 by California Congressman Mike Thompson to provide tax-exempt bond financing nationally for private-sector renewable energy projects, Zero-emission vehicle purchases, and "green" manufacturing facilities.

=== 2008–09 California budget crisis ===
In the fall of 2008, with the economy faltering, the legislature passed what Los Angeles Times political columnist George Skelton called "another atrocious, short-sighted, gimmicky budget that set a record for procrastination" and "wreaked havoc all across California among small business vendors, healthcare centers and nursing homes that couldn't be paid by the state until a budget was enacted." Lockyer was also critical of the budget. In 2009 the state faced a $25 billion deficit.

As negotiations began to revise the state budget, Lockyer tried to convince U.S. Treasury Secretary Timothy Geithner to guarantee state bond payments. "A fiscal meltdown by California ... would surely destabilize the U.S., if not worldwide financial markets," Lockyer wrote to Geithner on May 13. The Obama Administration declined the request.

When the legislature failed to pass a budget before the start of the new fiscal year on July 1, 2009, California began issuing IOUs to some state creditors. Lockyer suggested having an intermediary mediate between the Republican governor and the Democratic-controlled legislature. Republican State Senator Bob Huff scoffed at the idea, saying, "No caucus is going to go with that... I'm not going to vote for new taxes just because some mediator told me to."

Throughout the budget crisis, Lockyer warned that an impasse would increasingly raise the costs of short and long-term state borrowing, ultimately by as much as $7.5 billion in interest over the next 30 years. On July 6, with no budget agreement yet concluded, Fitch Ratings downgraded California's bond rating to BBB, just one notch above the dividing line between investment grade and speculative grade "junk" bonds. A Lockyer spokesman estimated that this downgrade alone would represent an immediate "hit of hundreds of millions of dollars" in higher credit costs.

As California continued to issue IOUs to cover $350 million in short-term debt, the formal standing of California bonds continued to decline. Moody's joined Fitch in cutting the State's debt rating because of increasing risk to debt service payments. A London firm tracking speculative credit default swaps ranked California ninth in the world among the 10 governmental entities most likely to default on their financial obligations.

In late July 2009, the governor and legislative leaders announced they had reached agreement on a budget plan that combined spending cuts with various accounting maneuvers. A month later, Standard and Poor's removed California bonds from its "credit watch list", indicating that while the bonds still had a negative outlook, they were not "under threat of an imminent downgrade". Lockyer was optimistic about this "positive development ... It reflects confidence that the budget solution adopted by the governor and legislature gets us on the right track...."

=== 2010 Tesla, Toyota and NUMMI electric auto partnership ===
When the Toyota corporation announced it would close the NUMMI auto plant in Fremont, California, after its long-time partner in the facility, General Motors, pulled out of the partnership, Lockyer appointed a blue-ribbon commission that publicized the adverse economic consequences of plant closure and the unemployment of several thousand workers, and pleaded with Toyota to reconsider. The company refused.

But Lockyer then helped arrange a new partnership at the NUMMI plant between Toyota and Tesla Motors, an electric car company he had previously assisted through the Treasurer's "Green Wave" investment policies.

=== 2010 election ===
Three of Lockyer's predecessors as state treasurer – Jesse Unruh, Kathleen Brown, and Phil Angelides – had lost gubernatorial campaigns, and Democratic pundits considered the treasurer's job a much "smaller bully pulpit," which did not provide a good springboard to higher office.

Despite persistent rumors that Lockyer, who had earlier accumulated a $10 million political war chest, might be a possibility for governor in 2010, he expressed no interest in mounting a campaign to succeed Schwarzenegger. When asked about the possibility, Lockyer stated that he saw no chance of winning a primary election battle with former governor Jerry Brown. Lockyer also said he preferred spending time with his family. "You kill yourself being a Governor," he said, "and then maybe you get a new aqueduct named after you." Lockyer was re-elected for a final term as state treasurer in the November 2010 election, defeating a Republican state senator from Orange County, Mimi Walters.

== Retirement from public office ==
As the end of his years as treasurer approached, Lockyer, unable to run for a third term due to term limits, after expressing a tentative interest in running for state controller in 2014, instead announced his retirement from elected office after four decades of public service.

== Personal life ==
In 2003, Lockyer married public interest attorney Nadia Davis, a former Alameda County Supervisor. They have three children. By an earlier marriage, he has an adult daughter.

== See also ==
- 1998 California Attorney General election
- 2002 California Attorney General election
- 2006 California State Treasurer election
- 2010 California State Treasurer election

Political offices
Preceded by David Roberti	President pro tempore of the California Senate; 1994–1998	Succeeded by John Burton
Preceded by Phil Angelides	Treasurer of California; 2007–2015	Succeeded by John Chiang
Legal offices
Preceded by Dan Lungren	Attorney General of California; 1999–2007	Succeeded by Jerry Brown
