= 2022 California State Treasurer election =

- November 8, 2022
- Registered: 21,940,274
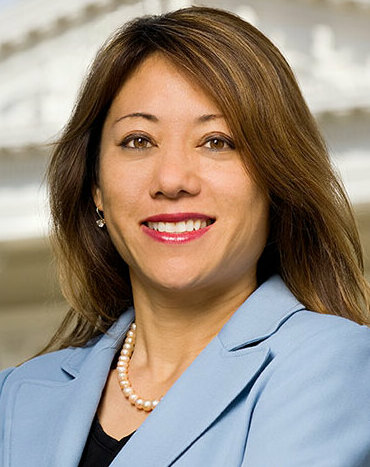

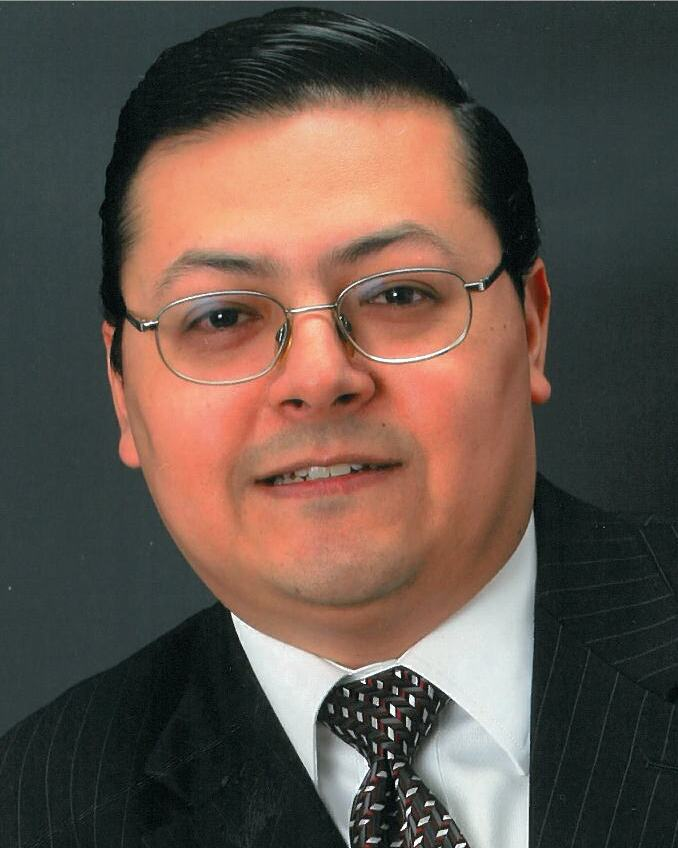
Candidate	Fiona Ma	Jack M. Guerrero
Party	Democratic	Republican
Popular vote	6,287,076	4,405,781
Percentage	58.80%	41.20%
- Ma: 50–60% 60–70% 70–80% 80–90% Guerrero: 50–60% 60–70% 70–80%
Treasurer before election
Fiona Ma
Democratic
Elected Treasurer
Fiona Ma
Democratic

The 2022 California State Treasurer election was held on November 8, 2022, to elect the State Treasurer of California. Incumbent Democratic treasurer Fiona Ma won re-election to a second term.

== Candidates ==
=== Democratic Party ===
==== Declared ====
- Fiona Ma, incumbent treasurer

=== Republican Party ===
==== Declared ====
- Andrew Do, Orange County supervisor
- Jack M. Guerrero, certified public accountant, Cudahy city councilman, and candidate for California State Treasurer in 2018

=== Peace and Freedom Party ===
==== Declared ====
- Meghann Adams, activist and local union president

== Endorsements ==
Meghann Adams (P&F)

Organizations

- Green Party of California
- Party for Socialism and Liberation
- Peace and Freedom Party
Jack Guerrero (R)

Newspapers

- The Orange County Register (post primary)
Fiona Ma (D)

Organizations

- AFSCME California
- California Democratic Party
- California Teachers Association
- Equality California
- Stonewall Democrats
Declined to endorse

Organizations

- California Republican Party

== Primary election ==
=== Results ===
Results by county Ma: 30–40%; 40–50%; 50–60%; 60–70%; 70–80%; Guerrero: 30–40%; 40–50%; 50–60%; Do: 30–40%

Primary election results
Party	Candidate	Votes	%
Democratic	Fiona Ma (incumbent)	3,903,967	57.44%
Republican	Jack M. Guerrero	1,489,533	21.92%
Republican	Andrew Do	1,157,620	17.03%
Peace and Freedom	Meghann Adams	245,369	3.61%
Total votes		6,796,489	100.0%

== General election ==
=== Polling ===
Poll source	Date(s) administered	Sample size (Note: Key: A – all adults RV – registered voters LV – likely voters V – unclear)	Margin of error	Fiona Ma (D)	Jack Guerrero (R)	Undecided
USC	October 30 – November 2, 2022	802 (RV)	± 3.5%	63%	37%	–

=== Results ===
2022 California State Treasurer election
Party	Candidate	Votes	%	±%
Democratic	Fiona Ma (incumbent)	6,287,076	58.80%	−5.33%
Republican	Jack M. Guerrero	4,405,781	41.20%	+5.33%
Total votes		10,692,857	100.00%	N/A
Democratic hold				

==== By county ====
County	Fiona Ma Democratic		Jack M. Guerrero Republican		Margin		Total votes cast
County	#	%	#	%	#	%	Total votes cast
Alameda	373,702	78.51%	102,300	21.49%	271,402	57.02%	476,002
Alpine	363	59.70%	245	40.30%	118	19.41%	608
Amador	6,294	34.46%	11,972	65.54%	-5,678	-31.09%	18,266
Butte	32,159	45.33%	38,790	54.67%	-6,631	-9.35%	70,949
Calaveras	7,428	35.54%	13,473	64.46%	-6,045	-28.92%	20,901
Colusa	1,709	31.39%	3,735	68.61%	-2,026	-37.22%	5,444
Contra Costa	257,553	67.49%	124,054	32.51%	133,499	34.98%	381,607
Del Norte	3,370	40.91%	4,868	59.09%	-1,498	-18.18%	8,238
El Dorado	35,323	40.64%	51,600	59.36%	-16,277	-18.73%	86,923
Fresno	98,682	45.92%	116,208	54.08%	-17,526	-8.16%	214,890
Glenn	2,116	27.14%	5,682	72.86%	-3,566	-45.73%	7,798
Humboldt	29,955	63.21%	17,435	36.79%	12,520	26.42%	47,390
Imperial	16,107	54.14%	13,641	45.86%	2,466	8.29%	29,748
Inyo	3,359	46.13%	3,922	53.87%	-563	-7.73%	7,281
Kern	70,434	37.76%	116,082	62.24%	-45,648	-24.47%	186,516
Kings	9,649	36.33%	16,910	63.67%	-7,261	-27.34%	26,559
Lake	9,872	49.80%	9,953	50.20%	-81	-0.41%	19,825
Lassen	1,821	20.15%	7,217	79.85%	-5,396	-59.70%	9,038
Los Angeles	1,546,485	67.09%	758,555	32.91%	787,930	34.18%	2,305,040
Madera	13,374	36.61%	23,156	63.39%	-9,782	-26.78%	36,530
Marin	90,236	78.12%	25,276	21.88%	64,960	56.24%	115,512
Mariposa	2,999	38.71%	4,748	61.29%	-1,749	-22.58%	7,747
Mendocino	19,297	64.49%	10,626	35.51%	8,671	28.98%	29,923
Merced	25,501	46.70%	29,110	53.30%	-3,609	-6.61%	54,611
Modoc	845	25.30%	2,495	74.70%	-1,650	-49.40%	3,340
Mono	2,457	54.94%	2,015	45.06%	442	9.88%	4,472
Monterey	64,314	63.77%	36,533	36.23%	27,781	27.55%	100,847
Napa	31,485	64.11%	17,625	35.89%	13,860	28.22%	49,110
Nevada	26,937	53.91%	23,031	46.09%	3,906	7.82%	49,968
Orange	451,006	47.04%	507,754	52.96%	-56,748	-5.92%	958,760
Placer	73,349	41.38%	103,894	58.62%	-30,545	-17.23%	177,243
Plumas	3,327	39.08%	5,187	60.92%	-1,860	-21.85%	8,514
Riverside	276,401	47.25%	308,538	52.75%	-32,137	-5.49%	584,939
Sacramento	269,881	57.99%	195,478	42.01%	74,403	15.99%	465,359
San Benito	10,458	54.44%	8,751	45.56%	1,707	8.89%	19,209
San Bernardino	210,227	47.05%	236,625	52.95%	-26,398	-5.91%	446,852
San Diego	559,423	55.64%	446,089	44.36%	113,334	11.27%	1,005,512
San Francisco	243,406	83.91%	46,681	16.09%	196,725	67.82%	290,087
San Joaquin	87,115	49.69%	88,209	50.31%	-1,094	-0.62%	175,324
San Luis Obispo	60,700	51.70%	56,714	48.30%	3,986	3.39%	117,414
San Mateo	178,893	73.97%	62,957	26.03%	115,936	47.94%	241,850
Santa Barbara	77,448	59.44%	52,848	40.56%	24,600	18.88%	130,296
Santa Clara	366,786	69.16%	163,551	30.84%	203,235	38.32%	530,337
Santa Cruz	77,120	75.74%	24,701	24.26%	52,419	51.48%	101,821
Shasta	19,991	29.90%	46,860	70.10%	-26,869	-40.19%	66,851
Sierra	568	37.10%	963	62.90%	-395	-25.80%	1,531
Siskiyou	6,746	38.68%	10,695	61.32%	-3,949	-22.64%	17,441
Solano	77,830	60.60%	50,597	39.40%	27,233	21.21%	128,427
Sonoma	137,588	71.21%	55,635	28.79%	81,953	42.41%	193,223
Stanislaus	56,053	43.32%	73,328	56.68%	-17,275	-13.35%	129,381
Sutter	9,414	34.15%	18,152	65.85%	-8,738	-31.70%	27,566
Tehama	5,602	27.49%	14,776	72.51%	-9,174	-45.02%	20,378
Trinity	1,966	43.97%	2,505	56.03%	-539	-12.06%	4,471
Tulare	33,484	37.03%	56,940	62.97%	-23,456	-25.94%	90,424
Tuolumne	8,702	38.02%	14,187	61.98%	-5,485	-23.96%	22,889
Ventura	148,747	53.93%	127,089	46.07%	21,658	7.85%	275,836
Yolo	44,257	66.51%	22,289	33.49%	21,968	33.01%	66,546
Yuba	6,762	35.05%	12,531	64.95%	-5,769	-29.90%	19,293
Totals	6,287,076	58.80%	4,405,781	41.20%	1,881,295	17.59%	10,692,857

Counties that flipped from Democratic to Republican

- Butte (largest municipality: Chico)
- Fresno (largest municipality: Fresno)
- Lake (largest municipality: Clearlake)
- Merced (largest municipality: Merced)
- Orange (largest municipality: Anaheim)
- Riverside (largest municipality: Riverside)
- San Bernardino (largest municipality: San Bernardino)
- San Joaquin (largest municipality: Stockton)
- Stanislaus (largest municipality: Modesto)

==== By congressional district ====
Ma won 37 of 52 congressional districts, with the remaining 15 going to Guerrero, including three that elected Democrats.

District	Ma	Guerrero	Representative
1st	35%	65%	Doug LaMalfa
2nd	71%	29%	Jared Huffman
3rd	44%	56%	Kevin Kiley
4th	64%	36%	Mike Thompson
5th	39%	61%	Tom McClintock
6th	55%	45%	Ami Bera
7th	64%	36%	Doris Matsui
8th	74%	26%	John Garamendi
9th	49%	51%	Josh Harder
10th	64%	36%	Mark DeSaulnier
11th	84%	16%	Nancy Pelosi
12th	89%	11%	Barbara Lee
13th	47%	53%	John Duarte
14th	68%	32%	Eric Swalwell
15th	75%	25%	Jackie Speier (117th Congress)
15th	75%	25%	Kevin Mullin (118th Congress)
16th	71%	29%	Anna Eshoo
17th	70%	30%	Ro Khanna
18th	65%	35%	Zoe Lofgren
19th	65%	35%	Jimmy Panetta
20th	32%	68%	Kevin McCarthy
21st	52%	48%	Jim Costa
22nd	49%	51%	David Valadao
23rd	39%	61%	Jay Obernolte
24th	59%	41%	Salud Carbajal
25th	52%	48%	Raul Ruiz
26th	53%	47%	Julia Brownley
27th	49%	51%	Mike Garcia
28th	63%	37%	Judy Chu
29th	71%	29%	Tony Cárdenas
30th	74%	26%	Adam Schiff
31st	58%	42%	Grace Napolitano
32nd	65%	35%	Brad Sherman
33rd	54%	46%	Pete Aguilar
34th	80%	20%	Jimmy Gomez
35th	55%	45%	Norma Torres
36th	66%	34%	Ted Lieu
37th	84%	16%	Karen Bass (117th Congress)
37th	84%	16%	Sydney Kamlager-Dove (118th Congress)
38th	57%	43%	Linda Sánchez
39th	54%	46%	Mark Takano
40th	44%	56%	Young Kim
41st	45%	55%	Ken Calvert
42nd	65%	35%	Lucille Roybal-Allard (117th Congress)
42nd	65%	35%	Robert Garcia (118th Congress)
43rd	78%	22%	Maxine Waters
44th	69%	31%	Nanette Barragán
45th	47%	53%	Michelle Steel
46th	57%	43%	Lou Correa
47th	48%	52%	Katie Porter
48th	38%	62%	Darrell Issa
49th	49.8%	50.2%	Mike Levin
50th	61%	39%	Scott Peters
51st	60%	40%	Sara Jacobs
52nd	62%	38%	Juan Vargas

== See also ==
- 2022 California elections
- 2022 California gubernatorial election
