= 2018 California State Treasurer election =

- November 6, 2018
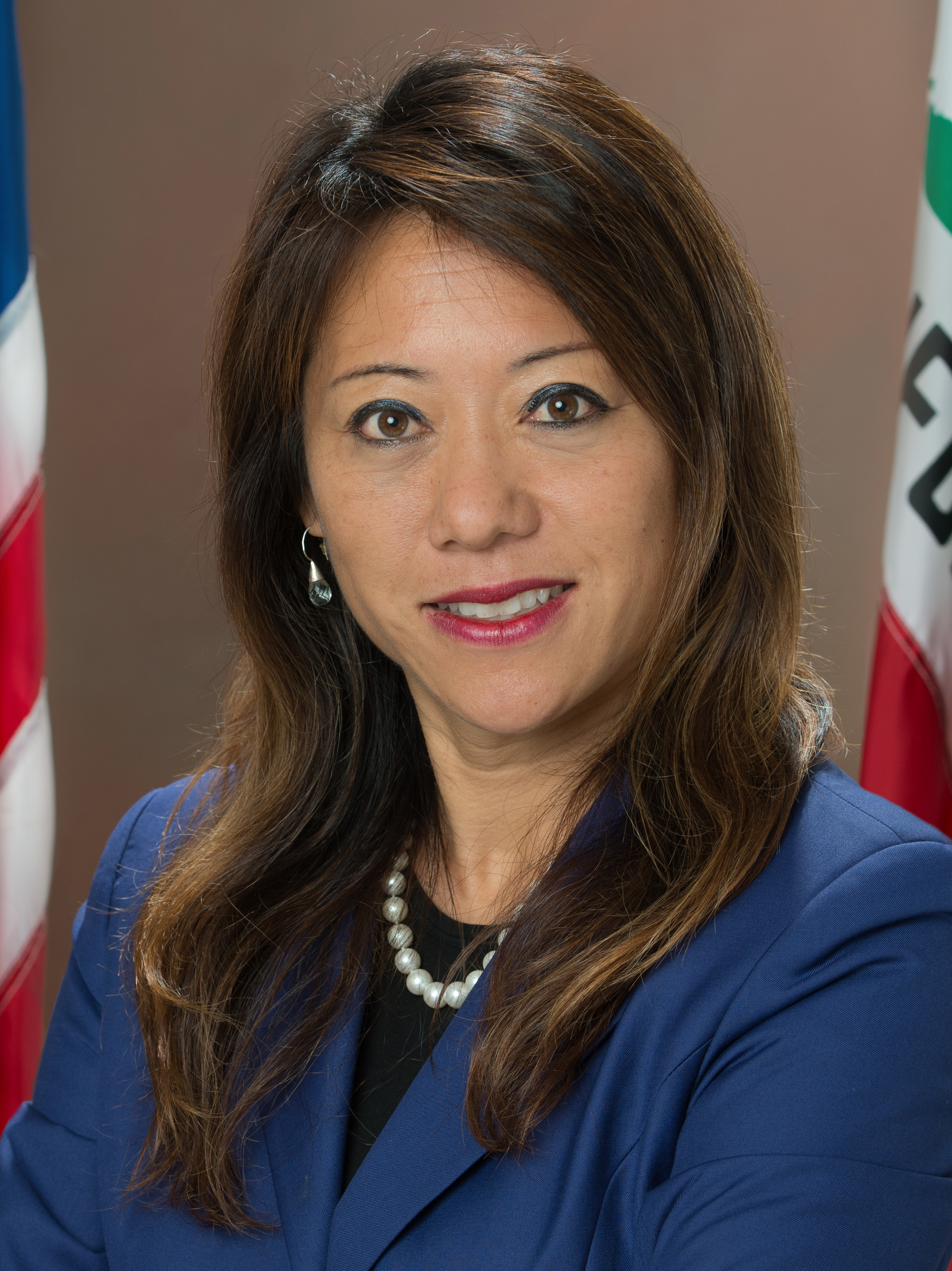

Candidate	Fiona Ma	Greg Conlon
Party	Democratic	Republican
Popular vote	7,825,587	4,376,816
Percentage	64.13%	35.87%
- County results Ma: 50–60% 60–70% 70–80% 80–90% Conlon: 50–60% 60–70% 70–80%
State Treasurer before election
John Chiang
Democratic
Elected State Treasurer
Fiona Ma
Democratic

The 2018 California State Treasurer general election was held on November 6, 2018, to elect the State Treasurer of California. Incumbent Democratic Treasurer John Chiang did not run for re-election to a second term and instead ran unsuccessfully for governor.

The race was between Fiona Ma, Democratic, Chair of the State Board of Equalization (California), and Greg Conlon, Republican, former president of the California Public Utilities Commission, after they won the two top spots from the June 5 direct primary election. Ma won the November election handily with more than 64% of all votes, and garnering more votes than any other candidate for Treasurer in the state's history. Ma's victory made her the first woman of color and only the 2nd CPA to ever serve as California State Treasurer.

== Primary election ==
=== Candidates ===
==== Republican Party ====
===== Declared =====
- Jack M. Guerrero, Cudahy City Councilman
- Greg Conlon, former president of the California Public Utilities Commission, nominee for California State Treasurer in 2014, candidate for United States Senate in 2016

==== Democratic Party ====
===== Declared =====
- Fiona Ma, chairwoman of the California State Board of Equalization
- Vivek Viswanathan, former Special Advisor to Gov. Jerry Brown and Policy Advisor to Hillary Clinton's 2016 presidential campaign.

===== Potential =====
- Brian Pendleton, philanthropist, activist and entrepreneur

===== Declined =====
- John Chiang, incumbent State Treasurer (running for Governor)
- Fabian Núñez, former Speaker of the California State Assembly

==== Peace and Freedom Party ====
===== Declared =====
- Kevin Akin, retired hospital maintenance worker and current state chair of the Peace and Freedom Party

=== Endorsements ===
Fiona Ma

Federal-level officials

- Kamala Harris, U.S. Senator (D-CA)
- Karen Bass, U.S. Representative (D-CA-37)
- Pete Aguilar, U.S. Representative (D-CA-31)
- Julia Brownley, U.S. Representative (D-CA-26)
- Judy Chu, U.S. Representative (D-CA-27)
- Jared Huffman, U.S. Representative (D-CA-2)
- Ro Khanna, U.S. Representative (D-CA-17)
- Ted Lieu, U.S. Representative (D-CA-33)
- Jimmy Panetta, U.S. Representative (D-CA-20)
- Mike Thompson, U.S. Representative (D-CA-5)
- Eric Swalwell, U.S. Representative (D-CA-15)
- Jimmy Gomez, U.S. Representative (D-CA-34)
- Mike Honda, former U.S. Representative
- George Miller, former U.S. Representative

State-level officials

- Anthony Rendon, Speaker of the California State Assembly
- Rob Bonta, California State Assemblymember (D-18)
- Ed Chau, California State Assemblymember (D-49)
- David Chiu, California State Assemblymember (D-17)
- Kansen Chu, California State Assemblymember (D-25)
- Jim Cooper, California State Assemblymember (D-9)
- Matt Dababneh, California State Assemblymember (D-45)
- Susan Eggman, California State Assemblymember (D-13)
- Jim Frazier, California State Assemblymember (D-11)
- Cristina Garcia, California State Assemblymember (D-58)
- Mike Gipson, California State Assemblymember (D-64)
- Todd Gloria, California State Assemblymember (D-78)
- Lorena Gonzalez Fletcher, California State Assemblymember (D-80)
- Adam Gray, California State Assemblymember (D-21)
- Jacqui Irwin, California State Assemblymember (D-44)
- Ash Kalra, California State Assemblymember (D-27)
- Evan Low, California State Assemblymember (D-28)
- Kevin McCarty, California State Assemblymember (D-7)
- Kevin Mullin, California State Assemblymember (D-22)
- Al Muratsuchi, California State Assemblymember (D-66)
- Adrin Nazarian, California State Assemblymember (D-46)
- Patrick O'Donnell, California State Assemblymember (D-70)
- Bill Quirk, California State Assemblymember (D-20)
- Tony Thurmond, California State Assemblymember (D-15)
- Phil Ting, California State Assemblymember (D-19)
- Jim Wood, California State Assemblymember (D-2)
- Reggie Jones-Sawyer, California State Assemblymember (D-59)
- Gene Mullin, former California State Assemblymember
- Nathan Fletcher, former California State Assemblymember
- Dario Frommer, former California State Assemblymember
- Mary Hayashi, former California State Assemblymember
- Sandre Swanson, former California State Assemblymember
- Hector De La Torre, former California State Assemblymember
- Joan Buchanan, former California State Assemblymember
- Paul Fong, former California State Assemblymember
- Patty Berg, former California State Assemblymember
- Amina Carter, former California State Assemblymember
- Bonnie Lowenthal, former California State Assemblymember
- Nicole Parra, former California State Assemblymember
- Mike Eng, former California State Assemblymember
- Alberto Torrico, former California State Assemblymember
- V. Manuel Perez, former California State Assemblymember
- Susan Bonilla, former California State Assemblymember
- Pedro Nava, former California State Assemblymember
- Floyd Mori, former California State Assemblymember
- John A. Dutra, former California State Assemblymember
- Wilmer Carter, former California State Assemblymember
- Fabian Núñez, former Speaker of the California State Assembly
- John Pérez, former Speaker of the California State Assembly
- Toni Atkins, California State Senator (D-39)
- Ben Allen, California State Senator (D-26)
- Jim Beall, California State Senator (D-15)
- Steve Bradford, California State Senator (D-35)
- Bill Dodd, California State Senator (D-3)
- Cathleen Galgiani, California State Senator (D-5)
- Bob Hertzberg, California State Senator (D-18)
- Jerry Hill, California State Senator (D-13)
- Ricardo Lara, California State Senator (D-33)
- Mike McGuire, California State Senator (D-2)
- Tony Mendoza, California State Senator (D-32)
- Bill Monning, California State Senator (D-17)
- Josh Newman, California State Senator (D-29)
- Richard Pan, California State Senator (D-6)
- Richard Roth, California State Senator (D-31)
- Bob Wieckowski, California State Senator (D-10)
- Scott Wiener, California State Senator (D-11)
- Mark Leno, former California State Senator
- Marty Block, former California State Senator
- Liz Figueroa, former California State Senator
- Steve Peace, former California State Senator
- Wes Chesbro, former California State Senator
- Noreen Evans, former California State Senator
- Betty Karnette, former California State Senator
- Isadore Hall III, former California State Senator
- Tom Torlakson, California State Superintendent of Public Instruction

Local-level officials

- Aja Brown, Mayor of Compton
- Darrell Steinberg, Mayor of Sacramento
- Janet Abelson, Mayor of El Cerrito
- Jesse Arreguin, Mayor of Berkeley
- Denise Athas, Mayor of Novato
- Robert Garcia, Mayor of Long Beach
- Kirsten Keith, Mayor of Menlo Park
- Ed Lee, Mayor of San Francisco
- Sam Liccardo, Mayor of San Jose
- Lori Liu, Mayor of Brisbane
- Polly Low, Mayor of Rosemead
- Manuel Lozano, Mayor of Baldwin Park
- Lily Mei, Mayor of Fremont
- Libby Schaaf, Mayor of Oakland
- John Seybert, Mayor of Redwood City
- Ali Sajjad Taj, Mayor of Artesia
- Raquel Vasquez, Mayor of Lemon Grove
- Dan Wolk, Mayor of Davis
- Fran Florez, Mayor Pro Tem of Shafter
- Jason Baker, former Mayor of Campbell
- Jim Dear, former Mayor of Carson
- Daniel Dodge, former Mayor of Watsonville
- Jose Esteves, former Mayor of Milpitas
- Mark Green, former Mayor of Union City
- Bill Harrison, former Mayor of Fremont
- Joey Luiz, former Mayor of Clearlake
- Willie Brown, former Mayor of San Francisco
- Luis Alejo, member of the Monterey County Board of Supervisors
- London Breed, member of the San Francisco Board of Supervisors
- Malia Cohen, member of the San Francisco Board of Supervisors
- Mark Farrell, member of the San Francisco Board of Supervisors
- Aaron Peskin, member of the San Francisco Board of Supervisors
- Jeff Sheehy, member of the San Francisco Board of Supervisors
- Katy Tang, member of the San Francisco Board of Supervisors
- Ahsha Safaí, member of the San Francisco Board of Supervisors
- Damon Connolly, member of the Marin County Board of Supervisors
- Judy Arnold, member of the Marin County Board of Supervisors
- Ryan Coonerty, member Santa Cruz County Board of Supervisors
- Zach Friend, member of the Santa Cruz Board of Supervisors
- John Gioia, member of the Contra Costa County Board of Supervisors
- Carole Groom, member of the San Mateo County Board of Supervisors
- Adam Hill, member of the San Luis Obispo Board of Supervisors
- Judy Morris, member of the Trinity County Board of Supervisors
- Henry Perea, Sr, member of the Fresno County Board of Supervisors
- Leticia Perez, member of the Fresno County Board of Supervisors
- Don Saylor, member of the Yolo County Board of Supervisors
- Ryan Sundberg, member of the Humboldt County Board of Supervisors
- John Viegas, member of the Glenn County Board of Supervisors
- John Zaragoza, member of the Ventura County Board of Supervisors
- Leticia Perez, member of the Kern County Board of Supervisors
- Willie Rivera, member of the Bakersfield City Council
- David Ryu, member of the Los Angeles City Council

Party Leaders and activists

- Craig Cheslog, California Democratic Party Region 2 Director
- Candi Easter, former Chair of the Kern County Democratic Party
- Martha Gamez, California Democratic Party Region 4 Director
- Florice Hoffman, California Democratic Party Region 17 Director
- Hene Kelly, California Democratic Party Region 6 Director
- Doug Kessler, California Democratic Party Region 8 Director
- Jeannie Klever, California Democratic Party Region 1E Director
- Matt Rogers, President of the Fresno County Young Democrats
- Susie Shannon, California Democratic Party Region 12 Director
- Omar Torres, California Democratic Party Region 7 Director
- Joe Louis Wildman, California Democratic Party Region 1W Director
Jack Guerrero

Organizations

- Howard Jarvis Taxpayers Association
- Republican Liberty Caucus
- California ProLife Council
- Californians For Life
- California Veterans Access PAC
- Santa Cruz County GOP
- Sonoma County GOP
- San Bernardino County GOP
- Riverside County Republican Assembly
- Placer County Republican Assembly
- Pacific Palisades Republican Club
- Mountain View Republicans
- San Fernando Valley GOP
- San Fernando Valley Republican Liberty Assembly
- Redlands Tea Party Patriots
- Craig Huey Voter Guide
- Powder Blue Report (Orange County)
- American Independent Party
- Election Forum Voter Guide
- Orange County Voter Guide/ California MAGA
- California Libertarian Report
- OC Politics Blog
- Surf City Tea Party (Huntington Beach)
- California Taxpayers Union
Vivek Viswanathan

Organizations

- The Mercury News

=== Results ===
Results by county Ma: 20–30%; 30–40%; 40–50%; 50–60%; 60–70%; Conlon: 20–30%; 30–40%; 40–50%; Guerrero: 30–40%

Nonpartisan blanket primary results
Party	Candidate	Votes	%
Democratic	Fiona Ma	2,900,606	44.54%
Republican	Greg Conlon	1,357,635	20.85%
Republican	Jack M. Guerrero	1,257,315	19.31%
Democratic	Vivek Viswanathan	848,026	13.02%
Peace and Freedom	Kevin Akin	148,282	2.28%
Total votes		6,511,864	100.00%

=== Results by county ===
Blue represents counties won by Ma. Red represents counties won by Conlon. Green represents counties won by Guerrero.

County	Ma%	Conlon%	Guerrero%	Viswanathan%	Akin%
Alameda	62.5	8.5	9.5	15.8	3.7
Alpine	45.0	18.5	20.9	13.8	1.9
Amador	32.1	28.1	31.5	6.2	2.1
Butte	36.3	27.8	24.1	9.5	2.2
Calaveras	32.3	30.0	29.1	6.1	2.5
Colusa	27.9	37.3	26.2	6.7	1.9
Contra Costa	50.5	16.2	15.6	15.7	2.0
Del Norte	34.3	27.3	28.4	6.9	3.1
El Dorado	33.0	25.1	32.0	8.6	1.3
Fresno	30.0	30.3	24.7	13.0	2.0
Glenn	23.3	41.3	28.2	5.0	2.2
Humboldt	49.5	16.1	19.1	11.8	3.5
Imperial	34.2	17.8	27.8	17.0	3.1
Inyo	28.3	28.5	28.0	12.3	2.8
Kern	24.5	44.3	20.9	8.2	2.2
Kings	25.7	34.8	30.8	6.6	2.1
Lake	40.1	21.3	23.4	12.5	2.8
Lassen	18.9	36.0	36.6	6.7	1.8
Los Angeles	50.0	15.1	16.8	15.9	2.2
Madera	26.4	30.4	32.6	8.7	1.8
Marin	65.0	9.6	11.0	12.8	1.6
Mariposa	30.3	32.3	27.8	7.5	2.1
Mendocino	55.3	16.7	13.5	11.0	3.6
Merced	31.1	26.6	25.6	14.2	2.5
Modoc	16.6	40.2	33.9	7.1	2.3
Mono	41.8	18.6	25.2	12.4	2.0
Monterey	53.0	20.4	14.1	10.3	2.2
Napa	51.6	20.7	15.0	10.7	2.0
Nevada	40.1	20.9	24.8	12.4	1.8
Orange	34.3	27.6	25.5	10.8	1.8
Placer	32.2	27.0	29.6	10.0	1.2
Plumas	29.6	27.8	30.5	10.2	1.9
Riverside	32.8	28.7	25.6	11.1	1.8
Sacramento	49.1	20.2	18.9	9.7	2.1
San Benito	41.2	21.2	24.6	11.1	1.9
San Bernardino	34.2	27.4	26.3	9.9	2.3
San Diego	39.8	25.0	20.8	13.2	1.3
San Francisco	64.8	6.2	7.0	12.5	9.5
San Joaquin	38.0	28.8	20.9	10.0	2.4
San Luis Obispo	41.0	25.7	22.6	9.1	1.6
San Mateo	61.1	12.9	11.5	12.6	1.9
Santa Barbara	43.1	21.2	22.0	12.5	1.2
Santa Clara	49.5	13.9	14.1	20.6	1.9
Santa Cruz	57.7	12.2	10.4	17.3	2.5
Shasta	21.7	32.9	34.6	8.7	2.2
Sierra	31.4	29.1	27.8	8.6	3.1
Siskiyou	29.7	27.8	28.3	11.5	2.8
Solano	47.5	18.9	19.3	12.2	2.0
Sonoma	58.1	13.2	13.2	13.5	2.0
Stanislaus	36.8	28.8	23.3	9.2	2.0
Sutter	26.0	35.4	26.0	10.0	2.5
Tehama	22.3	43.4	26.8	5.2	2.3
Trinity	35.0	24.7	28.3	9.0	3.1
Tulare	23.2	38.3	25.0	11.6	1.9
Tuolumne	34.4	27.0	29.8	6.9	2.0
Ventura	41.0	27.1	20.2	10.0	1.7
Yolo	55.5	16.7	14.0	11.8	2.0
Yuba	28.0	38.2	25.5	5.3	3.1
Totals	44.5	20.8	19.3	13.0	2.3

== General election ==
=== Results ===
2018 California State Treasurer election
Party	Candidate	Votes	%	±%
Democratic	Fiona Ma	7,825,587	64.13%	+5.32%
Republican	Greg Conlon	4,376,816	35.87%	−5.32%
Total votes		12,202,403	100.00%	N/A
Democratic hold				

==== By county ====
County	Fiona Ma Democratic		Greg Conlon Republican		Margin		Total votes cast
County	#	%	#	%	#	%	Total votes cast
Alameda	462,862	82.15%	100,586	17.85%	362,276	64.30%	563,448
Alpine	403	66.17%	206	33.83%	197	32.35%	609
Amador	6,817	39.62%	10,389	60.38%	-3,572	-20.76%	17,206
Butte	43,767	50.42%	43,046	49.58%	721	0.83%	86,813
Calaveras	8,394	39.73%	12,735	60.27%	-4,341	-20.55%	21,129
Colusa	2,235	39.66%	3,400	60.34%	-1,165	-20.67%	5,635
Contra Costa	283,452	70.28%	119,874	29.72%	163,578	40.56%	403,326
Del Norte	3,657	44.31%	4,596	55.69%	-939	-11.38%	8,253
El Dorado	38,344	43.81%	49,179	56.19%	-10,835	-12.38%	87,523
Fresno	126,725	51.54%	119,133	48.46%	7,592	3.09%	245,858
Glenn	2,783	34.16%	5,364	65.84%	-2,581	-31.68%	8,147
Humboldt	34,926	67.38%	16,908	32.62%	18,018	34.76%	51,834
Imperial	21,696	65.84%	11,259	34.16%	10,437	31.67%	32,955
Inyo	3,365	46.97%	3,799	53.03%	-434	-6.06%	7,164
Kern	86,701	43.29%	113,564	56.71%	-26,863	-13.41%	200,265
Kings	12,820	42.90%	17,065	57.10%	-4,245	-14.20%	29,885
Lake	11,615	55.85%	9,183	44.15%	2,432	11.69%	20,798
Lassen	2,310	26.06%	6,555	73.94%	-4,245	-47.88%	8,865
Los Angeles	2,126,054	73.87%	752,077	26.13%	1,373,977	47.74%	2,878,131
Madera	15,862	41.74%	22,142	58.26%	-6,280	-16.52%	38,004
Marin	100,940	79.74%	24,645	20.26%	75,295	59.48%	126,585
Mariposa	3,339	40.95%	4,815	59.05%	-1,476	-18.10%	8,154
Mendocino	22,926	69.88%	9,881	30.12%	13,045	39.76%	32,807
Merced	31,792	54.74%	26,288	45.26%	5,504	9.48%	58,080
Modoc	922	27.21%	2,466	72.79%	-1,544	-45.57%	3,388
Mono	2,743	57.18%	2,054	42.82%	689	14.36%	4,797
Monterey	78,824	68.64%	36,006	31.36%	42,818	37.29%	114,830
Napa	37,061	67.10%	18,171	32.90%	18,890	34.20%	55,232
Nevada	29,610	55.74%	23,515	44.26%	6,095	11.47%	53,125
Orange	549,402	51.81%	510,967	48.19%	38,435	3.62%	1,060,369
Placer	76,413	44.45%	95,504	55.55%	-19,091	-11.10%	171,917
Plumas	3,710	41.01%	5,337	58.99%	-1,627	-17.98%	9,047
Riverside	329,324	52.10%	302,757	47.90%	26,567	4.20%	632,081
Sacramento	314,492	62.46%	188,984	37.54%	125,508	24.93%	503,476
San Benito	11,940	60.20%	7,895	39.80%	4,045	20.39%	19,835
San Bernardino	286,896	54.23%	242,160	45.77%	44,736	8.46%	529,056
San Diego	661,376	58.87%	462,076	41.13%	199,300	17.74%	1,123,452
San Francisco	306,998	87.04%	45,699	12.96%	261,299	74.09%	352,697
San Joaquin	106,475	55.88%	84,059	44.12%	22,416	11.76%	190,534
San Luis Obispo	66,837	54.33%	56,174	45.67%	10,663	8.67%	123,011
San Mateo	215,097	77.09%	63,928	22.91%	151,169	54.18%	279,025
Santa Barbara	95,152	62.95%	56,013	37.05%	39,139	25.89%	151,165
Santa Clara	439,879	72.98%	162,852	27.02%	277,027	45.96%	602,731
Santa Cruz	91,777	78.56%	25,044	21.44%	66,733	57.12%	116,821
Shasta	23,093	33.46%	45,918	66.54%	-22,825	-33.07%	69,011
Sierra	656	40.10%	980	59.90%	-324	-19.80%	1,636
Siskiyou	7,693	42.97%	10,211	57.03%	-2,518	-14.06%	17,904
Solano	93,252	64.83%	50,587	35.17%	42,665	29.66%	143,839
Sonoma	154,066	74.59%	52,486	25.41%	101,580	49.18%	206,552
Stanislaus	80,530	52.34%	73,330	47.66%	7,200	4.68%	153,860
Sutter	11,694	40.30%	17,321	59.70%	-5,627	-19.39%	29,015
Tehama	6,629	32.18%	13,970	67.82%	-7,341	-35.64%	20,599
Trinity	2,500	47.78%	2,732	52.22%	-232	-4.43%	5,232
Tulare	43,775	44.49%	54,625	55.51%	-10,850	-11.03%	98,400
Tuolumne	9,840	42.06%	13,557	57.94%	-3,717	-15.89%	23,397
Ventura	174,336	57.48%	128,954	42.52%	45,382	14.96%	303,290
Yolo	51,403	70.69%	21,310	29.31%	30,093	41.39%	72,713
Yuba	7,407	39.21%	11,485	60.79%	-4,078	-21.59%	18,892
Totals	7,825,587	64.13%	4,376,816	35.87%	3,448,771	28.26%	12,202,403

Counties that flipped from Democratic to Republican

- Del Norte (largest city: Crescent City)

Counties that flipped from Republican to Democratic

- Butte (largest city: Chico)
- Orange (largest city: Anaheim)
- Riverside (largest city: Riverside)
- San Bernardino (largest city: San Bernardino)
- Stanislaus (largest city: Modesto)

== See also ==
- California gubernatorial election, 2018
- California lieutenant gubernatorial election, 2018
