= California's 11th district =

California's 11th district may refer to:

- California's 11th congressional district
- California's 11th State Assembly district
- California's 11th State Senate district
