= Electoral history of Barbara Lee =

American political record

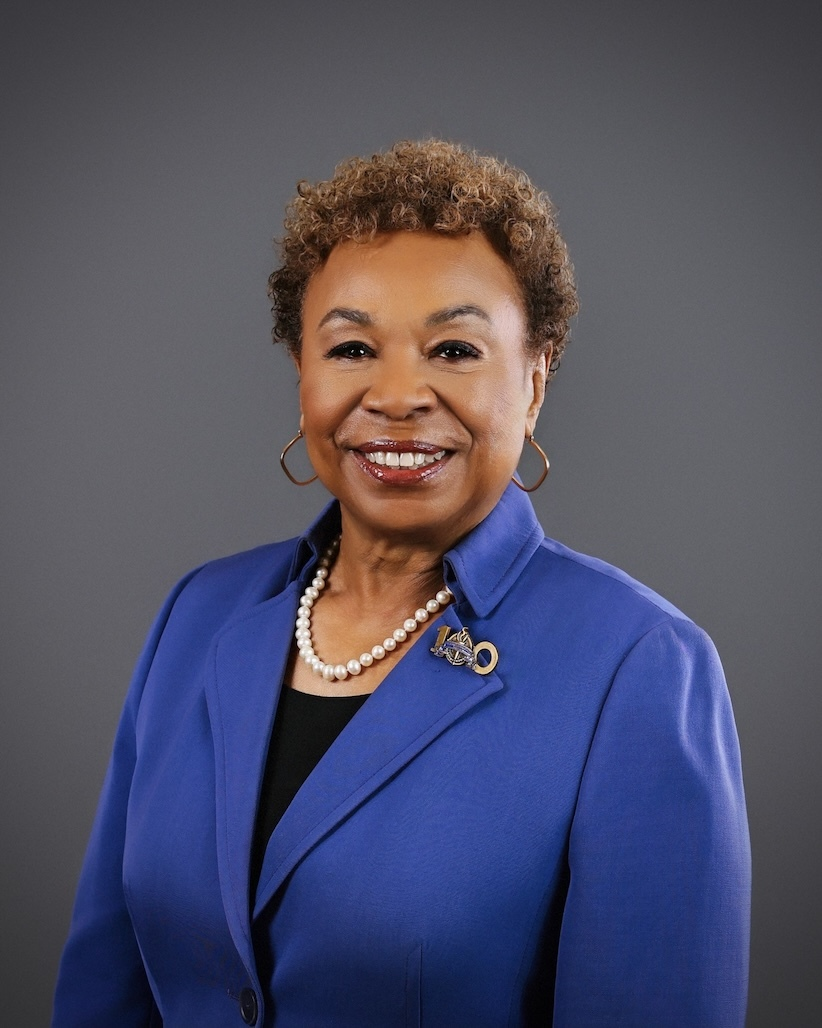
Official portrait, 2025.

Barbara Lee is an American politician currently serving as the Mayor of Oakland. Lee previously served in both the California State Assembly and California State Senate. She was elected to the U.S. House of Representatives in a special election in 1998, followed by 13 full terms in the House. She represented the 9th district from 1998 to 2013, 13th district from 2013 to 2023, and 12th district from 2023 to 2025. In 2024, Lee ran in the primaries for the U.S. Senate in the special and regular elections to fill Dianne Feinstein's seat, but she did not move onto the general elections. After Lee departed Congress, she was elected in the special election for the Mayor of Oakland following the recall of Sheng Thao.

== California State Assembly ==
1990 California State Assembly 13th district election
Primary election
| Party | Candidate | Votes | % |
|---|---|---|---|
| Democratic | Barbara Lee | 28,809 | 73.32 |
| Democratic | Aleta Cannon | 7,698 | 19.59 |
| Democratic | Aubrey LaBrie | 2,787 | 7.09 |
| Total votes | | 39,294 | 100.00 |
General election
| Democratic | Barbara Lee | 52,860 | 79.44 |
| Republican | Barbara M. Thomas | 13,682 | 20.56 |
| Total votes | | 66,542 | 100.00 |
| Democratic hold | | | |

1992 California State Assembly 16th district election
Primary election
| Party | Candidate | Votes | % |
|---|---|---|---|
| Democratic | Barbara Lee (incumbent) | 40,193 | 100.00 |
| Total votes | | 40,193 | 100.00 |
General election
| Democratic | Barbara Lee (incumbent) | 90,432 | 74.49 |
| Republican | David Anderson | 24,324 | 20.04 |
| Peace and Freedom | Emma Wong Mar | 6,643 | 5.47 |
| Total votes | | 121,399 | 100.00 |
| Invalid or blank votes | | 13,790 | |
| Democratic hold | | | |

1994 California State Assembly 16th district election
Primary election
| Party | Candidate | Votes | % |
|---|---|---|---|
| Democratic | Barbara Lee (incumbent) | 32,784 | 100.00 |
| Total votes | | 32,784 | 100.00 |
| Invalid or blank votes | | 12,324 | |
General election
| Democratic | Barbara Lee (incumbent) | 68,197 | 81.03 |
| Republican | Andre-Tanatha Ham-Lamme | 15,966 | 18.97 |
| Total votes | | 84,163 | 100.00 |
| Invalid or blank votes | | 19,925 | |
| Democratic hold | | | |

== California State Senate ==
1996 California State Senate 9th district election
Primary election
| Party | Candidate | Votes | % |
|---|---|---|---|
| Democratic | Barbara Lee | 65,481 | 60.06 |
| Democratic | Robert Campbell | 43,542 | 39.94 |
| Total votes | | 109,023 | 100.00 |
General election
| Democratic | Barbara Lee | 196,430 | 78.23 |
| Republican | Thomas N. Hudson | 37,341 | 14.87 |
| Peace and Freedom | Robert J. Evans | 8,870 | 3.53 |
| Natural Law | Carol Flyer Prettie | 8,465 | 3.37 |
| Total votes | | 273,226 | 100.00 |
| Invalid or blank votes | | 22,120 | |
| Democratic hold | | | |

== U.S. House of Representatives ==
=== California's 9th congressional district ===
1998 California's 9th congressional district special election
| Party | Candidate | Votes | % |
|---|---|---|---|
| Democratic | Barbara Lee | 33,497 | 66.81 |
| Democratic | Greg Harper | 8,048 | 16.05 |
| Republican | Claiborne Sanders | 6,114 | 12.19 |
| Democratic | Randal Stewart | 2,481 | 4.95 |
| Total votes | | 50,140 | 100.00 |
| Invalid or blank votes | | 2,037 | |
| Democratic hold | | | |

1998 California's 9th congressional district election
Primary election
| Party | Candidate | Votes | % |
|---|---|---|---|
| Democratic | Barbara Lee (incumbent) | 87,389 | 82.21 |
| Democratic | Greg Harper | 13,103 | 12.33 |
| Democratic | Randal Stewart | 5,812 | 5.47 |
| Total votes | | 106,304 | 100.0 |
General election
| Democratic | Barbara Lee (incumbent) | 140,722 | 82.83 |
| Republican | Claiborne "Clay" Sanders | 22,431 | 13.20 |
| Peace and Freedom | Gerald Sanders | 4,767 | 2.81 |
| Natural Law | Walter Ruehlig | 1,975 | 1.16 |
| Total votes | | 184,497 | 100.00 |
| Invalid or blank votes | | 14,602 | |
| Democratic hold | | | |

2000 California's 9th congressional district election
Primary election
| Party | Candidate | Votes | % |
|---|---|---|---|
| Democratic | Barbara Lee (incumbent) | 117,173 | 100.00 |
| Total votes | | 117,173 | 100.00 |
General election
| Democratic | Barbara Lee (incumbent) | 182,352 | 84.95 |
| Republican | Arneze Washington | 21,033 | 9.80 |
| Libertarian | Fred E. Foldvary | 7,051 | 3.28 |
| Natural Law | Ellen Jefferds | 4,214 | 1.96 |
| Total votes | | 229,917 | 100.00 |
| Invalid or blank votes | | 15,267 | |
| Democratic hold | | | |

2002 California's 9th congressional district election
Primary election
| Party | Candidate | Votes | % |
|---|---|---|---|
| Democratic | Barbara Lee (incumbent) | 68,550 | 84.90 |
| Democratic | Kevin Greene | 12,257 | 15.10 |
| Total votes | | 80,807 | 100.00 |
General election
| Democratic | Barbara Lee (incumbent) | 135,893 | 81.41 |
| Republican | Jerald Udinsky | 25,333 | 15.18 |
| Libertarian | James M. Eyer | 5,685 | 3.41 |
| No party | Hector Reyna (write-in) | 6 | 0.00 |
| Total votes | | 176,852 | 100.00 |
| Invalid or blank votes | | 9,935 | |
| Democratic hold | | | |

2004 California's 9th congressional district election
Primary election
| Party | Candidate | Votes | % |
|---|---|---|---|
| Democratic | Barbara Lee (incumbent) | 105,211 | 100.00 |
| Total votes | | 105,211 | 100.00 |
General election
| Democratic | Barbara Lee (incumbent) | 215,630 | 84.55 |
| Republican | Claudia Bermudez | 31,278 | 12.26 |
| Libertarian | Jim Eyer | 8,131 | 3.19 |
| Total votes | | 255,039 | 100.00 |
| Democratic hold | | | |

2006 California's 9th congressional district election
Primary election
| Party | Candidate | Votes | % |
|---|---|---|---|
| Democratic | Barbara Lee (incumbent) | 97,874 | 100.00 |
| Total votes | | 97,874 | 100.00 |
General election
| Democratic | Barbara Lee (incumbent) | 167,245 | 86.35 |
| Republican | John denDulk | 20,786 | 10.73 |
| Libertarian | James Eyer | 5,655 | 2.92 |
| Total votes | | 193,686 | 100.00 |
| Democratic hold | | | |

2008 California's 9th congressional district election
Primary election
| Party | Candidate | Votes | % |
|---|---|---|---|
| Democratic | Barbara Lee (incumbent) | 80,466 | 99.90 |
| Democratic | Brad Newsham (write-in) | 79 | 0.10 |
| Total votes | | 80,545 | 100.00 |
General election
| Democratic | Barbara Lee (incumbent) | 238,915 | 86.06 |
| Republican | Charles Hargrave | 26,917 | 9.70 |
| Libertarian | James Eyer | 11,704 | 4.22 |
| Green | David Heller (write-in) | 37 | 0.01 |
| Republican | Christopher Kula (write-in) | 27 | 0.01 |
| Total votes | | 277,600 | 100.00 |
| Democratic hold | | | |

2010 California's 9th congressional district election
Primary election
| Party | Candidate | Votes | % |
|---|---|---|---|
| Democratic | Barbara Lee (incumbent) | 82,951 | 100.00 |
| Total votes | | 82,951 | 100.00 |
General election
| Democratic | Barbara Lee (incumbent) | 180,400 | 84.27 |
| Republican | Gerald Hashimito | 23,054 | 10.77 |
| Green | Dave Heller | 4,848 | 2.27 |
| Libertarian | James M. Eyer | 4,113 | 1.92 |
| Peace and Freedom | Larry Allen | 1,670 | 0.78 |
| Total votes | | 214,085 | 100.00 |
| Democratic hold | | | |

=== California's 13th congressional district ===
2012 California's 13th congressional district election
Primary election
| Party | Candidate | Votes | % |
|---|---|---|---|
| Democratic | Barbara Lee (incumbent) | 94,709 | 83.11 |
| No party preference | Marilyn M. Singleton | 13,502 | 11.85 |
| Democratic | Justin Jelincic | 5,741 | 5.04 |
| Total votes | | 113,952 | 100.00 |
General election
| Democratic | Barbara Lee (incumbent) | 250,436 | 86.78 |
| No party preference | Marilyn M. Singleton | 38,146 | 13.22 |
| Total votes | | 288,582 | 100.00 |
| Democratic hold | | | |

2014 California's 13th congressional district election
Primary election
| Party | Candidate | Votes | % |
|---|---|---|---|
| Democratic | Barbara Lee (incumbent) | 77,461 | 82.59 |
| Republican | Dakin Sundeen | 9,533 | 10.16 |
| Democratic | Justin Jelincic | 4,602 | 4.91 |
| Peace and Freedom | Lawrence N. Allen | 2,190 | 2.34 |
| Total votes | | 93,786 | 100.00 |
General election
| Democratic | Barbara Lee (incumbent) | 168,491 | 88.48 |
| Republican | Dakin Sundeen | 21,940 | 11.52 |
| Total votes | | 190,431 | 100.00 |
| Democratic hold | | | |

2016 California's 13th congressional district election
Primary election
| Party | Candidate | Votes | % |
|---|---|---|---|
| Democratic | Barbara Lee (incumbent) | 192,227 | 91.95 |
| Republican | Sue Caro | 16,818 | 8.05 |
| Total votes | | 209,045 | 100.00 |
General election
| Democratic | Barbara Lee (incumbent) | 293,117 | 90.78 |
| Republican | Sue Caro | 29,754 | 9.22 |
| Total votes | | 322,871 | 100.00 |
| Democratic hold | | | |

2018 California's 13th congressional district election
Primary election
| Party | Candidate | Votes | % |
|---|---|---|---|
| Democratic | Barbara Lee (incumbent) | 159,751 | 99.33 |
| Green | Laura Wells (write-in) | 832 | 0.52 |
| Republican | Jeanne Marie Solnordal (write-in) | 178 | 0.11 |
| Libertarian | James M. Eyer (write-in) | 39 | 0.02 |
| No party preference | Lanenna Joiner (write-in) | 26 | 0.02 |
| American Independent | Vincent May (write-in) | 3 | 0.00 |
| Total votes | | 160,829 | 100.00 |
General election
| Democratic | Barbara Lee (incumbent) | 260,580 | 88.38 |
| Green | Laura Wells | 34,257 | 11.62 |
| Total votes | | 294,837 | 100.00 |
| Democratic hold | | | |

2020 California's 13th congressional district election
Primary election
| Party | Candidate | Votes | % |
|---|---|---|---|
| Democratic | Barbara Lee (incumbent) | 230,482 | 92.55 |
| Republican | Nikka Piterman | 18,553 | 7.45 |
| Total votes | | 249,035 | 100.00 |
General election
| Democratic | Barbara Lee (incumbent) | 327,863 | 90.37 |
| Republican | Nikka Piterman | 34,955 | 9.63 |
| Total votes | | 362,818 | 100.00 |
| Democratic hold | | | |

=== California's 12th congressional district ===
2022 California's 12th congressional district election
Primary election
| Party | Candidate | Votes | % |
|---|---|---|---|
| Democratic | Barbara Lee (incumbent) | 135,892 | 87.69 |
| Republican | Stephen Slauson | 8,274 | 5.34 |
| No party preference | Glenn Kaplan | 5,141 | 3.32 |
| Democratic | Eric Wilson | 3,753 | 2.42 |
| Republican | Ned Nuerge | 1,902 | 1.23 |
| Total votes | | 154,962 | 100.00 |
General election
| Democratic | Barbara Lee (incumbent) | 217,110 | 90.47 |
| Republican | Stephen Slauson | 22,859 | 9.53 |
| Total votes | | 239,969 | 100.00 |
| Democratic hold | | | |

== U.S. Senate ==
2024 United States Senate election in California Regular blanket primary
| Party | Candidate | Votes | % |
|---|---|---|---|
| Democratic | Adam Schiff | 2,304,829 | 31.57 |
| Republican | Steve Garvey | 2,301,351 | 31.52 |
| Democratic | Katie Porter | 1,118,429 | 15.32 |
| Democratic | Barbara Lee | 717,129 | 9.82 |
| Republican | Eric Early | 242,055 | 3.32 |
| Republican | James Bradley | 98,778 | 1.35 |
| Democratic | Christina Pascucci | 61,998 | 0.85 |
| Republican | Sharleta Bassett | 54,884 | 0.75 |
| Republican | Sarah Sun Liew | 38,718 | 0.53 |
| No party preference | Laura Garza | 34,529 | 0.47 |
| Republican | Jonathan Reiss | 34,400 | 0.47 |
| Democratic | Sepi Gilani | 34,316 | 0.47 |
| Libertarian | Gail Lightfoot | 33,295 | 0.46 |
| Republican | Denice Gary-Pandol | 25,649 | 0.35 |
| Republican | James Macauley | 23,296 | 0.32 |
| Democratic | Harmesh Kumar | 21,624 | 0.30 |
| Democratic | David Peterson | 21,170 | 0.29 |
| Democratic | Douglas Pierce | 19,458 | 0.27 |
| No party preference | Major Singh | 17,092 | 0.23 |
| Democratic | John Rose | 14,627 | 0.20 |
| Democratic | Perry Pound | 14,195 | 0.19 |
| Democratic | Raji Rab | 13,640 | 0.19 |
| No party preference | Mark Ruzon | 13,488 | 0.18 |
| American Independent | Forrest Jones | 13,140 | 0.18 |
| Republican | Stefan Simchowitz | 12,773 | 0.17 |
| Republican | Martin Veprauskas | 9,795 | 0.13 |
| No party preference | Don Grundmann | 6,641 | 0.09 |
| No party preference | Michael Dilger (write-in) | 7 | 0.00 |
| Republican | Carlos Guillermo Tapia (write-in) | 5 | 0.00 |
| No party preference | John Dowell (write-in) | 3 | 0.00 |
| Republican | Danny Fabricant (write-in) | 3 | 0.00 |
| Total votes | | 7,301,317 | 100.00 |

Results by county Schiff: 20–30%; 30–40%; 40–50%; Garvey: 30–40%; 40–50%; 50–60%; 60–70%

2024 United States Senate election in California Special blanket primary
| Party | Candidate | Votes | % |
|---|---|---|---|
| Republican | Steve Garvey | 2,455,115 | 33.25 |
| Democratic | Adam Schiff | 2,160,171 | 29.25 |
| Democratic | Katie Porter | 1,272,684 | 17.24 |
| Democratic | Barbara Lee | 866,551 | 11.74 |
| Republican | Eric Early | 451,274 | 6.11 |
| Democratic | Christina Pascucci | 109,867 | 1.49 |
| Democratic | Sepi Gilani | 68,497 | 0.93 |
| No party preference | Michael Dilger (write-in) | 27 | 0.00 |
| Total votes | | 7,384,186 | 100.00 |

== Mayor of Oakland ==
2025 Oakland mayoral special election, unofficial results
| Candidate | Round 1 | | Round 2 | | Round 3 | | Round 4 | | Round 5 | | Round 6 | | Round 7 | | Round 8 | | Round 9 |
| Candidate | Votes % | Transfer | Votes % | Transfer | Votes % | Transfer | Votes % | Transfer | Votes % | Transfer | Votes % | Transfer | Votes % | Transfer | Votes % | Transfer | Votes % |
|---|---|---|---|---|---|---|---|---|---|---|---|---|---|---|---|---|---|
| Barbara Lee | 47,177; 50.03% | +17 | 47,194; 50.07% | +66 | 47,260; 50.16% | +59 | 47,319; 50.25% | +245 | 47,564; 50.56% | +276 | 47,840; 50.92% | +83 | 47,923; 51.17% | +424 | 48,347; 51.75% | +588 | 48,935; 52.70% |
| Loren Taylor | 42,393; 44.95% | +43 | 42,436; 45.02% | +32 | 42,468; 45.07% | +66 | 42,534; 45.17% | +94 | 42,628; 45.32% | +264 | 42,892; 45.65% | +366 | 43,258; 46.19% | +292 | 43,550; 46.61% | +379 | 43,929; 47.30% |
| Tyron Jordan (withdrawn) | 1,001; 1.06% | +18 | 1,019; 1.08% | +23 | 1,042; 1.11% | +22 | 1,064; 1.13% | +53 | 1,117; 1.19% | +46 | 1,163; 1.24% | +124 | 1,287; 1.37% | +245 | 1,532; 1.64% | -1,532 | Eliminated |
| Renia Webb | 796; 0.84% | +10 | 806; 0.86% | +23 | 829; 0.88% | +47 | 876; 0.93% | +53 | 929; 0.99% | +106 | 1,035; 1.10% | +145 | 1,180; 1.26% | -1,180 | Eliminated | | |
| Mindy Pechenuk | 834; 0.88% | +8 | 842; 0.89% | +24 | 866; 0.92% | +32 | 898; 0.95% | +72 | 970; 1.03% | +52 | 1,022; 1.09% | -1,022 | Eliminated | | | | |
| Suz Robinson | 755; 0.80% | +14 | 769; 0.82% | +15 | 784; 0.83% | +35 | 819; 0.87% | +39 | 858; 0.91% | -858 | Eliminated | | | | | | |
| Eric Simpson | 588; 0.62% | +5 | 593; 0.63% | +14 | 607; 0.64% | +51 | 658; 0.70% | -658 | Eliminated | | | | | | | | |
| Elizabeth Swaney | 324; 0.34% | +9 | 333; 0.35% | +32 | 365; 0.39% | -365 | Eliminated | | | | | | | | | | |
| Peter Liu | 253; 0.27% | +13 | 266; 0.28% | -266 | Eliminated | | | | | | | | | | | | |
| Cristina Grappo | 184; 0.20% | -184 | Eliminated | | | | | | | | | | | | | | |
| Total active ballots | 94,305 | | 94,258 | | 94,221 | | 94,168 | | 94,066 | | 93,952 | | 93,648 | | 93,429 | | 92,864 |
| Exhausted ballots | | +45 | 45 | +33 | 78 | +48 | 126 | +99 | 225 | +110 | 335 | +299 | 634 | +214 | 848 | +530 | 1,378 |
