= 2010 California Superintendent of Public Instruction election =

- June 8, 2010 (first round); November 2, 2010 (runoff)
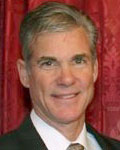

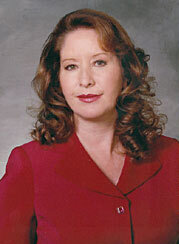
Candidate	Tom Torlakson	Larry Aceves	Gloria Romero
First round	808,970; 18.6%	832,938; 19.1%	738,032; 16.9%
Runoff	4,222,946; 54.5%	3,476,243; 44.9%	Eliminated
Candidate	Lydia Gutierrez	Grant McMicken	Karen Blake
First round	384,514; 8.8%	309,499; 7.1%	299,492; 6.9%
Runoff	Eliminated	Eliminated	Eliminated
Candidate	Diane Lenning	Daniel Nusbaum
First round	270,570; 6.2%	217,220; 5.0%
Runoff	Eliminated	Eliminated
- Runoff county results Torlakson: 40–50% 50–60% 60–70% Aceves: 40–50% 50–60% 60–70%
SPI before election
Jack O'Connell
Democratic
Elected SPI
Tom Torlakson

The 2010 California Superintendent of Public Instruction election occurred on November 2, 2010. Incumbent Jack O'Connell was term-limited and unable to run for re-election to a third term.

In the nonpartisan primary election on June 8, 2010, no candidate received a majority of the votes. The top two finishers, Larry Aceves, who came first with 19% of the vote, and Democratic State Assemblyman Tom Torlakson, who came second with 18.5% of the vote, advanced to the general election. In the general election on November 2, 2010, Torlakson defeated Aceves.

== Primary election ==
=== Candidates ===
- Larry Aceves, former Superintendent of the Franklin-McKinley School District and of the Alum Rock Union Elementary School District
- Karen Blake, geologist
- Alexia Deligianni, Board member of the Orange Unified School District
- Lydia Gutierrez, teacher
- Diane Lenning, teacher and businesswoman
- Leonard James Martin, retired
- Grant McMicken, teacher
- Daniel Nusbaum, teacher
- Gloria Romero, State Senator
- Faarax Dahir Sheikh-Noor
- Tom Torlakson, State Assemblyman
- Henry Williams, professor

=== Results ===
California Superintendent of Public Instruction primary election, 2010
Candidate	Votes	%
Larry Aceves	832,938	19.12
Tom Torlakson	808,970	18.57
Gloria Romero	738,032	16.94
Lydia Gutierrez	384,514	8.83
Grant McMicken	309,499	7.11
Karen Blake	299,492	6.88
Diane Lenning	270,570	6.21
Daniel Nusbaum	217,220	4.99
Alexia Deligianni	212,145	4.87
Henry Williams	125,283	2.88
Leonard James Martin	123,791	2.84
Faarax Dahir Sheikh-Noor	33,586	0.77
Total votes	4,356,040	100

== General election ==
=== Candidates ===
- Larry Aceves, former Superintendent of the Franklin-McKinley School District and of the Alum Rock Union Elementary School District
- Tom Torlakson, State Assemblyman

=== Results ===
California Superintendent of Public Instruction, 2010
Candidate	Votes	%
Tom Torlakson	4,222,946	54.52
Larry Aceves	3,476,243	44.88
Diane Lenning (write-in)	46,061	0.60
Total votes	7,745,250	100

== See also ==
- California elections, 2010
- California Department of Education
