= Tom Torlakson =

American politician (born 1949)

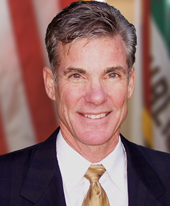

27th California State Superintendent of Public Instruction
- In office January 3, 2011 – January 7, 2019
- Governor: Jerry Brown
- Preceded by: Jack O'Connell
- Succeeded by: Tony Thurmond

Member of the California Senate from the 7th district
- In office December 4, 2000 – November 30, 2008
- Preceded by: Richard Rainey
- Succeeded by: Mark DeSaulnier

Member of the California State Assembly from the 11th district
- In office December 1, 2008 – November 30, 2010
- Preceded by: Mark DeSaulnier
- Succeeded by: Susan Bonilla
- In office December 2, 1996 – November 30, 2000
- Preceded by: Bob Campbell
- Succeeded by: Joe Canciamilla

Personal details
- Born: July 19, 1949 (age 77) San Francisco, California, U.S.
- Party: Democratic
- Spouse(s): Diana (m. 1970s, div. 2008) Mae Cendana (m. 2009)
- Children: 2
- Education: University of California, Berkeley (BA, MA)

Military service
- Allegiance: United States
- Branch/service: United States Marine Corps
- Years of service: 1967–1971
- Unit: United States Merchant Marine
- Battles/wars: Vietnam War

Thomas Allen Torlakson (born July 19, 1949) is an American educator and politician from California. In 2010, he was elected to the position of California State Superintendent of Public Instruction, a position he served in until 2019. He is a member of the Democratic Party.

He previously served three terms in the California State Assembly, representing the 11th district, which consists of northern portions of Contra Costa County. He also served two terms in the California State Senate, representing the 7th district.

== Early life ==
His younger brother, James Torlakson, is an artist in San Francisco, California. Another younger brother (Christopher Torlakson) is deceased. Torlakson attended Westmoor High School in Daly City, California. On May 25, 2017, Torlakson issued the commencement address where he graduated from 50 years ago.

Torlakson served in the U.S. Merchant Marine during the Vietnam War from 1967 to 1970. His assignments included Guam, Vietnam, Thailand and later on Chevron oil tankers to Alaska which was his first job where he was a union member. In 1968, he received the Merchant Marines Vietnam Service Medal. After his maritime service, Torlakson attended the University of California, Berkeley. He earned a B.A. in History in 1971, and an M.A. in Education in 1977.

He began work as a science teacher in 1972.

== Politics ==
Torlakson served on the Antioch City Council from 1978 to 1980 and was a member of the Contra Costa County Board of Supervisors from 1980 to 1996.

=== California State Assembly ===
In 1996 Torlakson, then a Contra Costa County Supervisor, ran for the California State Assembly seat of term-limited Bob Campbell (D-Richmond). He defeated George Miller IV, son of veteran congressman George Miller III, in the Democratic primary. Torlakson campaigned with the slogan, "His own name, his own record." He was easily reelected in 1998.

=== California State Senate ===
In 2000 Torlakson won an expensive, hard fought campaign to unseat Republican state Senator Richard Rainey (R-Walnut Creek) by 12%. While serving in the State Senate, Torlakson was appointed to chair the important Senate Appropriations Committee.

=== California State Superintendent of Public Instruction ===
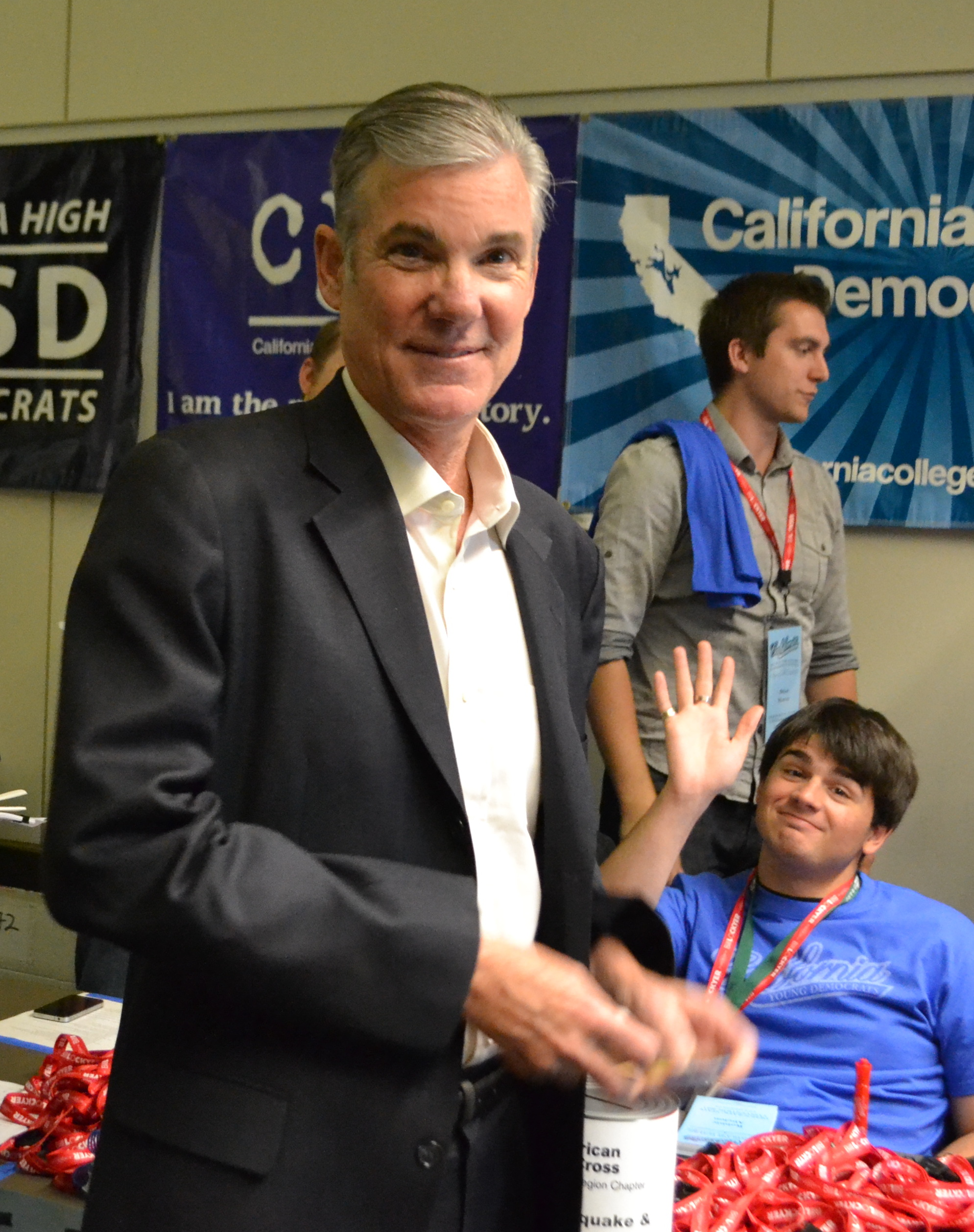
Torlakson at the 2011 California Democratic Party state convention

Torlakson ran for California State Superintendent of Public Instruction in the 2010 elections, defeating Larry Aceves in the general election held on November 2, 2010. Torlakson replaced Jack O'Connell, who was termed out of office. He was re-elected in 2014 against challenger Marshall Tuck.

As Superintendent, Torlakson was eighth in the line of succession to the office of Governor of California. On Monday, July 25, 2016, Governor Jerry Brown; Lieutenant Governor Gavin Newsom; Senate President Pro Tem Kevin de León; Assembly Speaker Anthony Rendon; Secretary of State Alex Padilla; then Attorney General Kamala Harris; Insurance Commissioner Dave Jones; and Board of Equalization chair Fiona Ma were all out of state attending the 2016 Democratic National Convention in Philadelphia, leaving Torlakson Acting Governor. As Acting Governor, Torlakson proclaimed a state of emergency for the Sand Fire in Los Angeles County and the Soberanes Fire in Monterey County.

==== Pegasus California School Scandal ====
In 2021, it was reported by Business Insider that Val Verde Unified had engaged in a scheme to funnel children in Qingdao, China to US colleges. The plan relied on the issuance of fraudulent high school diplomas from "Pegasus California School," a Qingdao-based school that was framed as a legitimate part of VVUSD and thus able to issue proper diplomas from an accredited institution. A 2026 by the Riverside County Office of Education confirmed the report, issuing a rebuke of the school district and several former senior California school officials, including former California State Superintendent Tom Torlakson and former Education Secretary David Long.

== Personal life ==
Torlakson is married to Mae Cendana, a member of the Ambrose Recreation and Park District board of directors. Mae ran for the State Assembly in 2016 to represent the 14th district. She won the primary, but lost the general election. He has two daughters, Tiffany and Tamara, from a previous marriage.

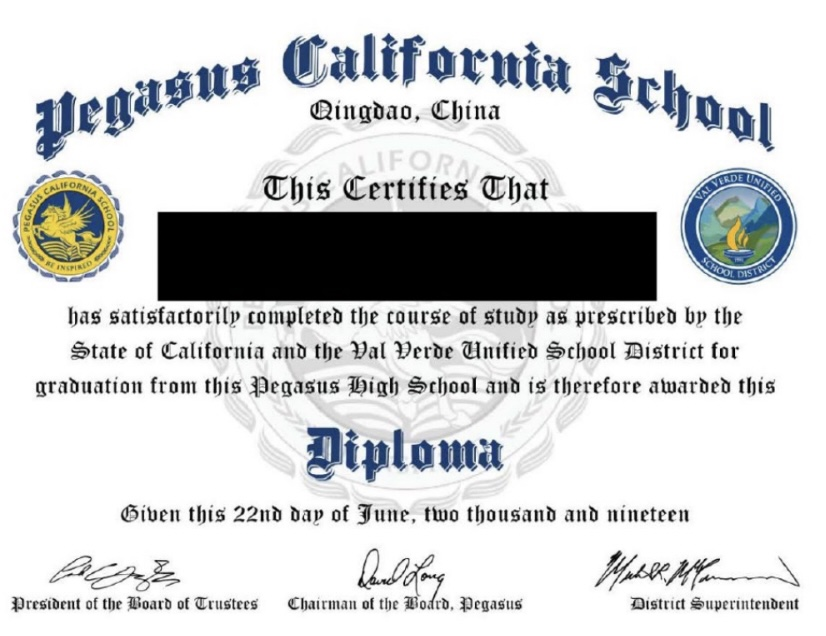
A fraudulent high school diploma issued by what was styled to be the "Pegasus California School" of the Val Verde Unified School District.

== Electoral history ==
California State Assembly 11th District Democratic Primary Election, 1996
Party	Candidate	Votes	%
Democratic	Tom Torlakson	23,689	51.02
Democratic	George Miller	22,746	48.98

California State Assembly 11th District Election, 1996
Party	Candidate	Votes	%
Democratic	Tom Torlakson	81,820	60.02
Republican	Bill Maxfield	42,137	30.91
Natural Law	Eleanor Sheppard	12,375	9.06

California State Assembly 11th District Election, 1998
Party	Candidate	Votes	%
Democratic	Tom Torlakson (inc.)	80,323	69.02
Republican	Allen Payton	36,046	30.98

California State Senate 7th District Election, 2000
Party	Candidate	Votes	%
Democratic	Tom Torlakson	197,683	54.5
Republican	Dick Rainey	156,107	43.0
Natural Law	Mark Billings	9,334	2.5

California State Senate 7th District Election, 2004
Party	Candidate	Votes	%
Democratic	Tom Torlakson (inc.)	282,714	100.0

California State Assembly 11th District Election, 2008
Party	Candidate	Votes	%
Democratic	Tom Torlakson	117,773	73.8
Republican	Elizabeth Hansen	42,023	26.2

California Superintendent of Public Instruction Primary Election, 2010
Party	Candidate	Votes	%
Nonpartisan	Larry Aceves	832,938	19.2
Nonpartisan	Tom Torlakson	808,970	18.6
Nonpartisan	Gloria Romero	738,032	17.0
Nonpartisan	Lydia Gutierrez	384,514	8.9
Nonpartisan	Grant McMicken	309,499	7.2
Nonpartisan	Karen Blake	299,492	6.9
Nonpartisan	Diane Lenning	270,570	6.2
Nonpartisan	Daniel Nusbaum	217,220	4.9
Nonpartisan	Alexia Deligianni	212,145	4.8
Nonpartisan	Leonard James Martin	123,791	2.8
Nonpartisan	Henry Williams, Jr.	125,283	2.8
Nonpartisan	Faarax Dahir Sheikh-Noor	33,586	0.7

California Superintendent of Public Instruction Election, 2010
Party	Candidate	Votes	%
Nonpartisan	Tom Torlakson	4,222,946	54.6
Nonpartisan	Larry Aceves	3,476,243	44.9
Nonpartisan/Write-in	Diane Lenning	46,061	0.5

California Superintendent of Public Instruction Primary Election, 2014
Party	Candidate	Votes	%
Nonpartisan	Tom Torlakson (inc.)	1,767,257	46.5
Nonpartisan	Marshall Tuck	1,098,441	28.9
Nonpartisan	Lydia Gutiérrez	931,719	24.5

California Superintendent of Public Instruction Election, 2014
Party	Candidate	Votes	%
Nonpartisan	Tom Torlakson (inc.)	3,167,212	52.1
Nonpartisan	Marshall Tuck	2,906,989	47.9

Political offices
Preceded by Jack O'Connell	California Superintendent of Public Instruction; 2011–2019	Succeeded by Tony Thurmond
