= Lori Wilson (California politician) =

American politician (born 1976)

Lori D. Wilson
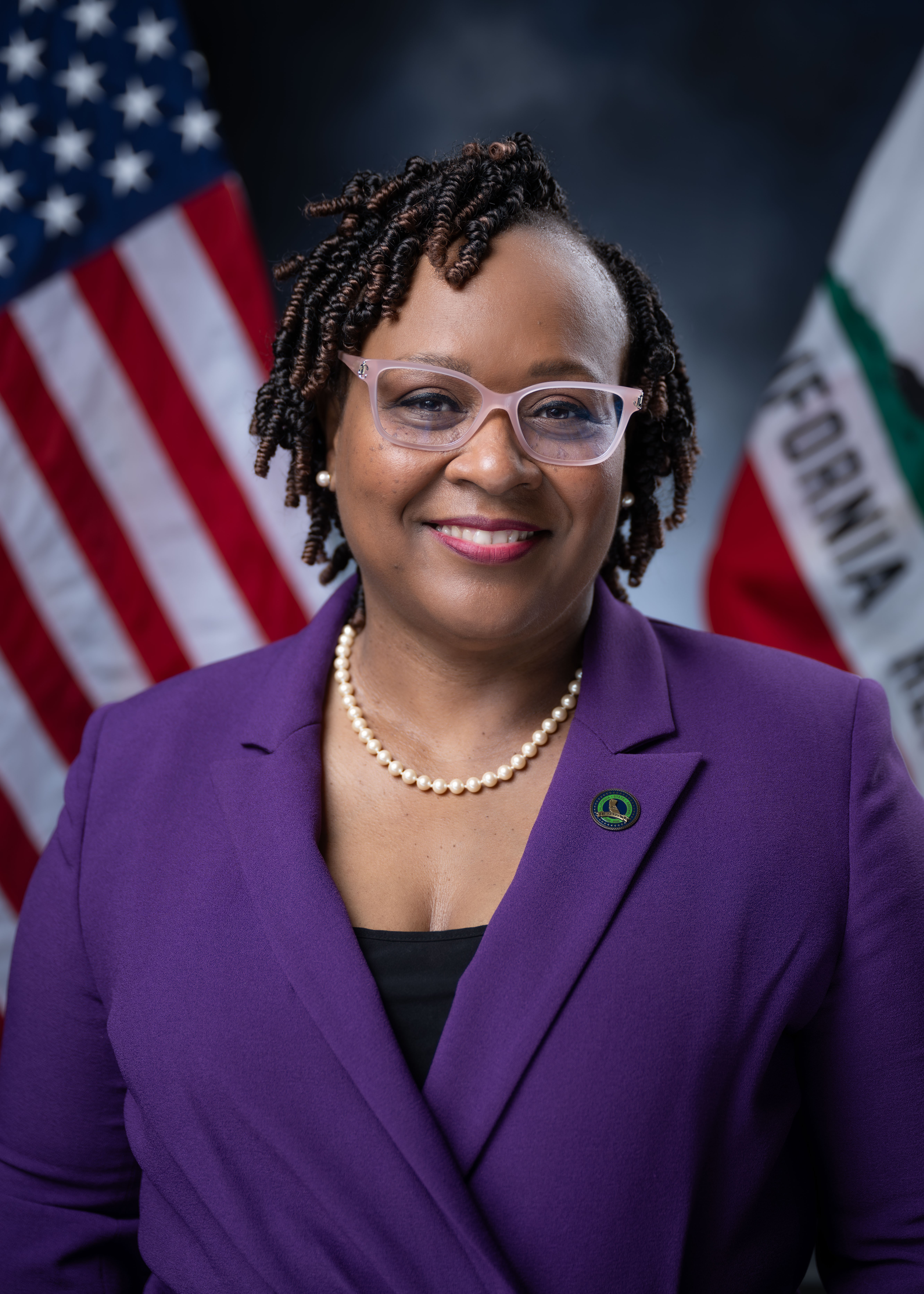
- Official portrait, 2025

Member of the California State Assembly from the 11th district
- Incumbent
- Assumed office April 6, 2022
- Preceded by: Jim Frazier

Personal details
- Born: Lori Denise Johnson; July 17, 1976 (age 50) Fresno, CA, U.S.
- Party: Democratic
- Spouse: Chavares Wilson
- Children: 2
- Education: California State University, Sacramento (BS)

Lori Denise Wilson (born July 17, 1976) is an American politician elected to the California State Assembly. She is a Democrat elected to represent the 11th district, encompassing Solano County and parts of Contra Costa County, including the city of Oakley, and Sacramento County. Prior to being elected to the State Assembly, she was mayor of Suisun City.

In 2023, Wilson authored AB957, a bill that would have required courts to consider a parent’s affirmation of their child’s gender identity or expression when determining the child's best interest in custody or visitation proceedings. This bill was ultimately vetoed by Governor Newsom.

In November 2023, Wilson made history when she was appointed chair of the Assembly Transportation Committee, becoming the first Black woman to hold that position in California.

== Electoral history ==
=== Suisun City ===
2012 Suisun City City Council election
Candidate	Votes	%
Lori Wilson	5,148	39.1
Michael A. Segala	4,291	32.6
Sam Derting	3,664	27.8
Write-in	56	0.4
Total votes	13,159	100.0

2016 Suisun City City Council election
Candidate	Votes	%
Lori Wilson (incumbent)	6,338	52.1
Michael A. Segala (incumbent)	5,572	45.8
Write-in	248	2.0
Total votes	12,158	100.0

2018 Suisun City mayoral election
Candidate	Votes	%
Lori Wilson	4,768	57.1
Pete Sanchez	3,522	42.2
Write-in	55	0.7
Total votes	8,345	100.0

=== California State Assembly ===
2022 California State Assembly 11th district special election Vacancy resulting from the resignation of Jim Frazier
Primary election
Party	Candidate	Votes	%
Democratic	Lori Wilson	30,243	93.9
Republican	Erik Elness (write-in)	1,975	6.1
Total votes		32,218	100.0
Democratic hold			

2022 California State Assembly 11th district election
Primary election
Party	Candidate	Votes	%
Democratic	Lori Wilson (incumbent)	52,139	64.2
No party preference	Jenny Leilani Callison	28,992	35.7
No party preference	James Berg (write-in)	23	0.0
Total votes		81,154	100.0
General election
Democratic	Lori Wilson (incumbent)	85,599	59.2
No party preference	Jenny Leilani Callison	58,889	40.8
Total votes		144,488	100.0
Democratic hold			

2024 California State Assembly 11th district election
Primary election
Party	Candidate	Votes	%
Democratic	Lori Wilson (incumbent)	50,129	50.2
Republican	Dave Ennis	26,078	26.1
Republican	Wanda Wallis	14,641	14.7
Democratic	Jeffrey Flack	8,988	9.0
Total votes		99,836	100.0
General election
Democratic	Lori Wilson (incumbent)	124,283	58.8
Republican	Dave Ennis	87,156	41.2
Total votes		211,439	100.0
Democratic hold			
