= John T. Knox =

American politician

Member of the California State Assembly from the 11th district
- In office January 2, 1961 - November 30, 1980
- Preceded by: Salathiel Charles Masterson II
- Succeeded by: Robert Campbell

Personal details
- Born: September 30, 1924 Reno, Nevada
- Died: April 3, 2017 (aged 92) Richmond, California
- Party: Democratic
- Spouse: Jean Henderson
- Children: 3
- Profession: lawyer

Military service
- Allegiance: United States of America
- Branch/service: United States Army Air Forces
- Battles/wars: World War II

John Theryll Knox (September 30, 1924 – April 3, 2017) was an American politician and lawyer.

He served in the California State Assembly for the 11th district and as Speaker Pro Tempore. He was a Democrat.

Knox was born in Reno, Nevada and moved to California with his parents in 1929. He served in the United States Army Air Forces during World War II. He received his bachelor's degree from Occidental College and his law degree from University of California, Hastings College of the Law. Knox was admitted to the California bar in 1953 and practiced law in Richmond, California. He died at a hospital in Richmond after a long illness.

== Legislative career ==
Knox served in the California Assembly from 1960 to 1980, acting as Assembly speaker from 1976-1980. During this time, he championed major legislation such as the California Environmental Quality Act (CEQA).

Knox was supported by both Democratic and Republican voters in the 1974 and 1976 elections.

== Legacy ==
A portion of Interstate 580 running through Richmond is called the John T. Knox Freeway.
