= Joe Canciamilla =

American politician (born 1955)

Member of the California State Assembly from the 11th district
- In office December 4, 2000 - November 30, 2006
- Preceded by: Tom Torlakson
- Succeeded by: Mark DeSaulnier

Personal details
- Born: Joseph E. Canciamilla; April 19, 1955 (age 71) Pittsburg, California
- Party: Democratic
- Education: St. Mary's College; J.D. John F. Kennedy University College of Law.

Joseph E. Canciamilla (born April 19, 1955) is a Democratic politician who represented California's 11th State Assembly district from December 4, 2000, to November 30, 2006. Canciamilla retired as the Contra Costa County Clerk-Recorder on October 31, 2019.

== Early life and political career ==
Canciamilla was born on April 19, 1955, in Pittsburg, California. He graduated Pittsburg High School, St. Mary's College and John F. Kennedy University College of Law.

First elected to the Pittsburg Board of Education at the age of 17, Joe was the youngest elected official in the nation. After serving almost 4 terms on the school board, Canciamilla moved on to the Pittsburg City Council where he served over two terms, including two years as Mayor. He was elected to the Contra Costa County Board of Supervisors in 1996 and to the State Assembly in 2000 serving the 11th Assembly District.

In July 2021, Canciamilla pleaded guilty to nine counts of perjury and grand theft. He was sentenced to one year's home detention, which he is serving in his beachfront condo on Kauai, Hawaii.

== Political Accomplishments ==
In his first term in the Assembly, Canciamilla enacted legislation to protect investors from fraudulent and deceptive "Enron-like" partnerships, provide better security options for Animal Control Officers, and expand more energy options for California businesses.

During his second term, Canciamilla wanted to encourage more constructive dialogue and cooperation between Democratic and Republican legislators, therefore, he and Assemblymember Keith Richman, a Republican from Northridge organized the 27 member Bi-Partisan Group which regularly met to discuss policy issues.

== Personal life ==
Canciamilla has experience in the private sector as co-owner of Pittsburg Funeral Chapel, Inc., a family-owned business for over 50 years, and as an attorney who maintained a practice for over 10 years. He is married to a doctor named Laura Stephenson.

Political offices
Preceded by Tom Torlakson	California State Assemblymember, 11th District; 2000 – 2006	Succeeded by Mark DeSaulnier
