= Fiona Ma =

American politician (born 1966)

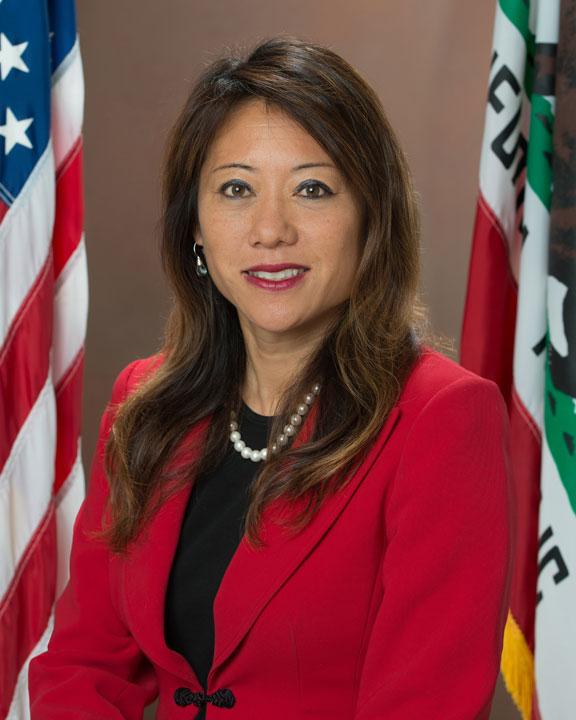
- Official portrait, 2020

Lieutenant Governor-elect of California
- Assuming office January 4, 2027
- Governor: Xavier Becerra (elect)
- Succeeding: Eleni Kounalakis

34th Treasurer of California
- Incumbent
- Assumed office January 7, 2019
- Governor: Gavin Newsom
- Preceded by: John Chiang

Chair of the California Board of Equalization
- In office February 24, 2016 – February 23, 2017
- Preceded by: Jerome Horton
- Succeeded by: Diane Harkey

Member of the California Board of Equalization from the 2nd district
- In office January 5, 2015 – January 7, 2019
- Preceded by: Betty Yee (redistricted)
- Succeeded by: Malia Cohen

Speaker pro tempore of the California State Assembly
- In office March 27, 2010 – August 10, 2012
- Preceded by: Lori Saldaña
- Succeeded by: Nora Campos

Member of the California State Assembly from the 12th district
- In office December 4, 2006 – November 30, 2012
- Preceded by: Leland Yee
- Succeeded by: Phil Ting

Member of the San Francisco Board of Supervisors from the 4th district
- In office December 11, 2002 – December 4, 2006
- Preceded by: Leland Yee
- Succeeded by: Ed Jew

Personal details
- Born: March 4, 1966 (age 60) New York City, U.S.
- Party: Democratic
- Spouse: Jason Hodge (m. 2011; div. 2026)
- Education: Rochester Institute of Technology (BS); Golden Gate University (MS); Pepperdine University (MBA)

Fiona Ma (born March 4, 1966) is an American politician and accountant who has served as the 34th state treasurer of California since January 7, 2019. She is the lieutenant governor-elect of California. She previously was a member of the California Board of Equalization (2015–2019), the California State Assembly (2006–2012), and the San Francisco Board of Supervisors (2002–2006).

A member of the Democratic Party, Ma was the first Asian American woman to serve as California Assembly Speaker pro Tempore, the second highest-ranking office in the California Assembly. She was selected as Chairperson of the California Board of Equalization in 2016, and ordered three external audits of the agency.

In 2021, Ma was accused of sexual harassment and racial discrimination in a lawsuit filed by a former employee. The suit was settled in 2024 by the state of California for $350,000.

In March 2019, Ma announced she would run for the 2026 California gubernatorial election. In March 2023, she announced that she would be running for the 2026 California lieutenant gubernatorial election instead.

== Early life and education ==
Ma is the oldest of three children born to William and Sophia Ma, both Chinese immigrants. Her father, William Ma, was a mechanical engineer. Her mother, Sophia (née Doo), was a high school art teacher for 20 years. Her paternal grandfather Ma Zhen was the first mayor of Kunming city in China during the Republic of China era and was of Bai ethnicity.

Ma was born in New York City on March 4, 1966. She attended Baker Elementary School before graduating from Great Neck North Middle and High Schools. Ma earned a Bachelor of Science degree in accounting from Rochester Institute of Technology, a Master of Science in taxation from Golden Gate University, and a Master of Business Administration from Pepperdine University. She is a CPA.

== Career ==
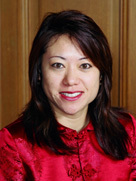
Ma's official portrait while in the San Francisco Board of Supervisors.

Ma was appointed to the Assessment Appeals Board of San Francisco by the San Francisco Board of Supervisors in 1995. That same year, she was a part-time district representative for then-State Senator John Burton. She served as Burton's district representative until her election to the San Francisco Board of Supervisors in 2002.

=== San Francisco Board of Supervisors ===
Ma was elected to the San Francisco Board of Supervisors from 2002 to 2006 representing District 4. While serving on that board, her legislative focus was a campaign to shut down massage parlors claimed to traffic persons into the country and use them for prostitution. As a Supervisor, she also started her advocacy regarding banning some chemicals from children's toys - passing an ordinance to "prohibit the manufacture, sale, or distribution in commerce of any toy or child-care article…if it contains bisphenol-A or other specified chemicals."

=== California Assembly ===
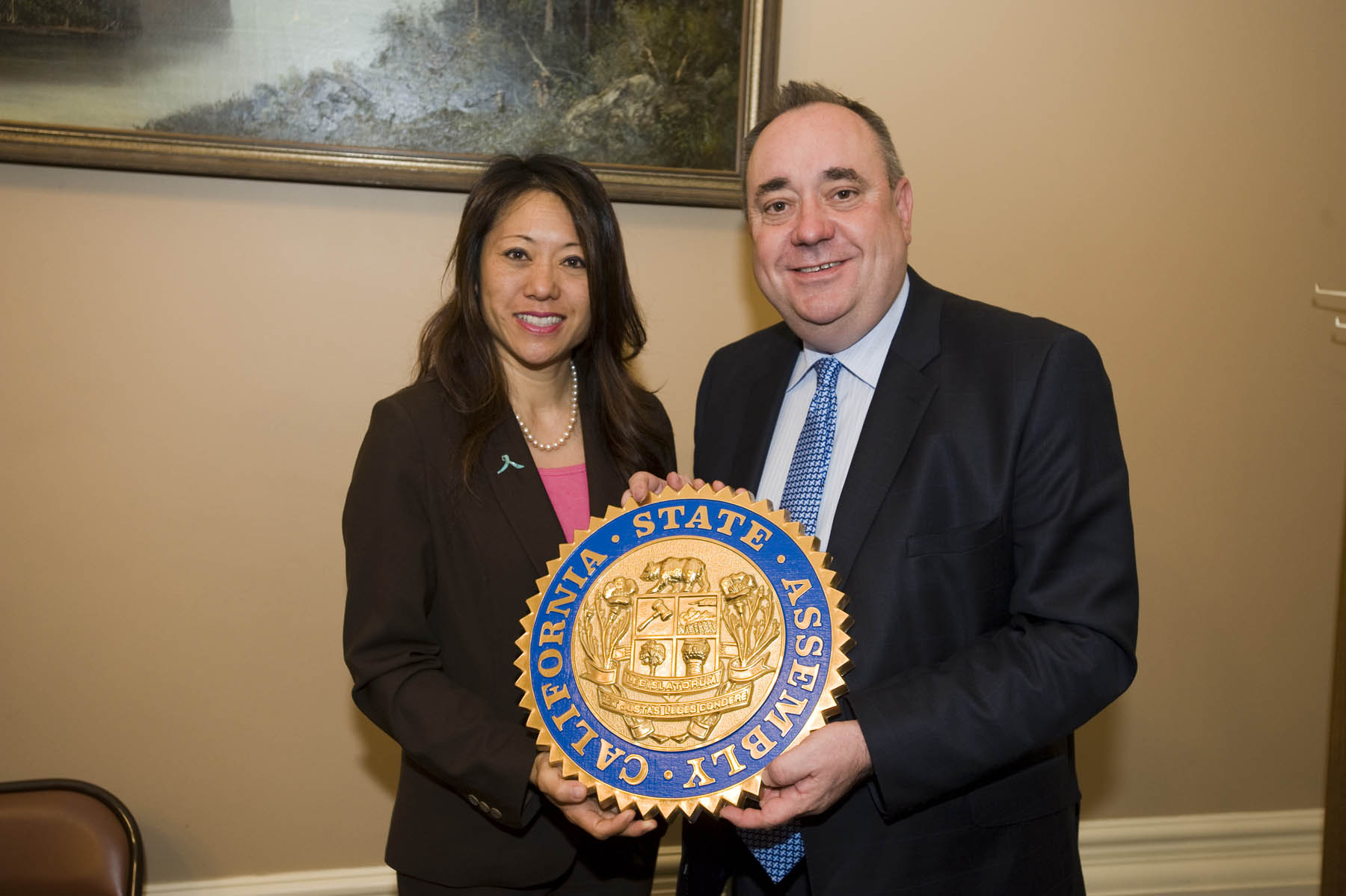
Ma with Scottish First Minister Alex Salmond in 2012.

Ma was elected to represent California's 12th Assembly District from November 2006 to November 2012, serving the maximum of three terms.

Ma won the Democratic nomination in that district against Janet Reilly in the state primary election of June 6, 2006. The campaign was one of the more expensive legislative primary races in the state.

Ma was appointed Assembly majority whip by the speaker of the assembly, Fabian Núñez, a position which she held for 4 years. In 2010, Speaker of the Assembly John Pérez appointed Ma to the position of Speaker pro Tempore, a position which she held for her final 2 years.

As an assemblywoman, Ma continued her work around safety in children's toys, writing legislation banning chemicals in products for babies and small children. Ma's legislation was later incorporated into Senator Dianne Feinstein's federal Consumer Product Safety Improvement Act of 2008 enacted on August 15, 2008.

=== California Board of Equalization ===
On November 4, 2014, Ma won election to district 2 of the California State Board of Equalization. She received 1,448,657 votes, or 68.5% of the vote. On February 24, 2016, the Board selected Ma as its chair.

=== California state treasurer ===
On May 17, 2016, Ma announced she was opening her campaign to run for California treasurer in the 2018 election. On June 5, 2018, she finished first in the nonpartisan open primary, and then defeated Republican Greg Conlon in the November 6 election. On January 7, 2019, she was sworn in as the first woman of color to ever serve as California State Treasurer.

==== Head banker and strengthening state finances ====
In her first year in office, Wall Street's Fitch Ratings and Moody's upgraded California's general obligation bonds, citing improved fiscal management. In November 2019, the nonpartisan California Legislative Analyst's Office reported on the Treasurer's cost-cutting impact stating: "the State Treasurer has been able to refinance much of the state's bond debt. Consequently, much of the state's outstanding debt now carries a lower interest rate resulting in lower annual costs." Overall in 2019, Ma's office oversaw $85 billion in bonds and $85-100 billion in short term investments.

==== Green financing and environmental policy ====
Ma chaired the inaugural meeting of the California Green Bond Market Development Committee on June 5, 2019 to develop standards for what qualified as a green bond, and incorporating green bonds into the financing of state infrastructure projects.
Ma launched the Small Business Energy Efficiency Financing and the Affordable Multifamily Energy Efficiency Financing programs in October 2019 to help small business, nonprofits and affordable housing owners to reduce the cost of financing energy efficiency improvements. Ma also chaired the California Alternative Energy and Advanced Transportation Financing Authority (CAEATFA) and the California Pollution Control Financing Authority (CPCFA).
In December 2020, Ma's office enrolled the 1,000th loan of the Residential Energy Efficiency Loan Program, to a Yuba County homeowner to install a highly efficient HVAC and smart thermostat.

==== Affordable housing ====
Ma's office oversees private activity bonds and state housing tax credits that are used to build and maintain low-income housing and keep rents in these units affordable. In 2019, her office sold over $180 million of bonds for the California Department of Veterans Affairs (CalVet) program to provide affordable loans to veterans.
In September 2020, Ma released policy reports on affordable housing for community college students, working with the Southern California Association of Non-Profit Housing. With the California School Finance Authority (CSFA), Ma's office issued $87 million in bonds to build 352 beds for Santa Rosa Junior College. In October 2020, the CTCAC chaired by Ma approved tax credits for low-income housing in counties heavily damaged by the Camp, Tubbs, Thomas, and Mendocino Complex wildfires in 2017 and 2018.

==== Protecting families, consumers and small business ====
In June 2019, Ma announced the launch of the CalSavers Retirement Savings Program, which offers an IRA retirement savings option to employees who don't currently have one through their employer.

==== COVID-19 pandemic ====
In May 2020, Ma began operating the COVID-19 Emergency HELP Loan Program to provide financial assistance to health facilities impacted by the COVID-19 pandemic.

By May 2020, California had spent $2.2 billion on safety gear to prevent coronavirus infection. No-bid contracts were used because of the emergency and unprecedented need for personal protective equipment. The state's standard purchasing processes were disrupted and Ma's office took on an oversight role.

=== Accusations of impropriety and sexual harassment lawsuit ===
In summer of 2021, a former staffer filed a civil rights complaint against Ma, alleging sexual harassment and wrongful termination for declining the harassing behavior. In court filings, Judith Blackwell complained that Ma created a hostile work environment by making overt and unwanted advances while the two shared a hotel room on work trips. Such behavior included exposing her bare rear end to Blackwell on multiple occasions. Ma also gave Blackwell many gifts, such as jewelry, a prime parking spot and marijuana edibles, up until the time she was fired according to Politico. Ma was also accused of accepting inappropriate gifts.

Ma had also shared hotel rooms 13 times with her chief of staff over a two-year period. Ma has denied any wrongdoing in her defense against Blackwell and said the sharing of hotel rooms was a cost-saving measure.

The suit was settled in 2024 by the state of California for $350,000.

== Political positions ==
=== Business taxes ===
A priority for Ma while on the Board of Equalization was to get everyone to pay "their fair share of taxes", particularly "the $8 billion in unpaid taxes in the underground economy." This included efforts to get Amazon to collect sales tax on transactions from third-party sellers as a way of helping local brick-and-mortar retailers to compete – estimated at between $431 million and $1.8 billion in new revenue for California every year. In her first year, Ma also advocated for e-cigarettes to be taxed like tobacco products, as a way to deter vaping and smoking, and to pay for health-costs caused by tobacco use. Two years later in 2017, voters passed Prop. 56 with a nearly 2/3 majority, collecting $1.7 billion in new tobacco taxes which was spent on anti-smoking programs and funding Medi-Cal payments for the poor. Ma also identified the cannabis industry as "the largest shadow economy in California" with "hundreds of millions of dollars that disappear into an underground cannabis economy".

=== Tax relief for citizens and small business ===
After 2015's Valley Fire, Ma proposed a new law (enacted the following year) that granted some tax relief to businesses that suffer losses from a natural disaster like the Valley Fire. Ma has also actively supported California's Earned Income Tax Credit to give cash back to low-income individuals, and promoted expansion of the program to minimum wage earners and independent contractors.

=== Clean government reforms ===
Within months of joining the Board of Equalization, Ma became "very, very frustrated" with the agency's fiscal conditions and mishandling of state tax accounts. She initiated three external audits of the agency. The audits exposed a culture of mismanagement, nepotism and political use of state resources. Ma co-sponsored legislation to toughen campaign reporting requirements for BOE members. She then led the effort to ask the Governor to appoint a public trustee to take over the agency, and called on CA Attorney General Xavier Becerra to assign independent legal counsel for the agency. Ma laid out a list of reforms which was incorporated into the "Taxpayer Transparency and Fairness Act of 2017", the biggest restructuring of the Board of Equalization in its 138-year history. The law was signed by Governor Jerry Brown in June 2017 and supported by Assembly Speaker Anthony Rendon, Senate President Kevin de León, and former BOE member Controller Betty Yee.

=== Women and diversity ===
In 2016, she received Emerge California's Woman of the Year Award and was a speaker at the Ascend Conference, the largest non-profit Pan-Asian business conference in America. Among her many other activities, Ma also celebrated Women's Equality Day at the Kelley House in Mendocino and spoke to students at the Future Chinese Leaders of America in Los Angeles.

=== Banning toxic chemicals ===
As a Supervisor in San Francisco, she authored and passed an ordinance to "prohibit the manufacture, sale, or distribution in commerce of any toy or child-care article…if it contains bisphenol-A or other specified chemicals." As a California State Legislator she passed a similar bill. This language was later used by Senator Dianne Feinstein in the federal Consumer Product Safety Improvement Act of 2008, signed into law in 2008.

== Personal life ==
Ma married Jason Hodge, a Ventura County firefighter of Native American descent and an Oxnard Port Commissioner with the Port of Hueneme in Ventura County, in November 2011. Ma filed for divorce in January 2026.

== Electoral history ==
Year	Office	Party	Primary			General				Result	Swing	Ref.
Year	Office	Party	Total	%	P.	Total	%	±%	P.	Result	Swing	Ref.
2002	San Francisco Supervisor	Nonpartisan	4,259	23.56%	1st	8,289	56.19%	N/A	1st	Won	N/A	
2006	State Assemblymember	Democratic	31,526	60.08%	1st	73,922	71.00%	–6.58%	1st	Won	Hold	
2008	State Assemblymember	Democratic	41,329	100.0%	1st	131,231	83.26%	+12.26%	1st	Won	Hold	
2010	State Assemblymember	Democratic	37,606	100.0%	1st	90,388	80.76%	-2.50%	1st	Won	Hold	
2014	State Board of Equalization	Democratic	876,378	68.86%	1st	1,448,657	68.67%	+25.83%	1st	Won	Flip	
2018	State Treasurer	Democratic	2,900,606	44.54%	1st	7,825,587	64.13%	+5.32%	1st	Won	Hold	
2022	State Treasurer	Democratic	3,903,967	57.44%	1st	6,287,071	58.80%	-5.33%	1st	Won	Hold	
2026	Lieutenant Governor	Democratic	1,631,935	19.12%	1st				1st	Won	Hold	

California Assembly
Preceded by Lori Saldaña	Speaker pro tempore of the California Assembly; 2010–2012	Succeeded by Nora Campos
Party political offices
Preceded by John Chiang	Democratic nominee for Treasurer of California; 2018, 2022	Succeeded by Eleni Kounalakis
Preceded by Eleni Kounalakis	Democratic nominee for Lieutenant Governor of California; 2026	Most recent
Political offices
Preceded by John Chiang	Treasurer of California; 2019–present	Incumbent
