= Robert Campbell (California politician) =

American politician (1937–2020)

Member of the California State Assembly from the 11th district
- In office December 1, 1980 – November 30, 1996
- Preceded by: John T. Knox
- Succeeded by: Tom Torlakson

Personal details
- Born: December 20, 1937 Los Angeles, California, U.S.
- Died: March 27, 2020 (aged 82) Richmond, California
- Party: Democratic
- Spouse: Maria Viramontes
- Children: 2
- Education: San Francisco State University
- Occupation: Insurance executive, politician

Military service
- Branch/service: United States Army; California National Guard
- Rank: Captain

Robert Joseph Campbell (December 20, 1937 – March 27, 2020) was an American politician who served 16 years in the California State Assembly, from 1980 to 1996. He represented the 11th district. He was a member of the Democratic Party.

== Early life, education and army service ==
His family settled in Richmond, California, when he was a child. After high school graduation, he attended Contra Costa College and San Francisco State University, where he received a Bachelor of Arts in 1961. He later received a Master of Arts in history from the University of California, Berkeley in 1964.

He served in the U.S. Army and the California National Guard from 1961 to 1972 where he attained the rank of captain.

He worked in the insurance industry.

== Political career ==
He developed an interest in politics while still in college and worked on several election campaigns. He was elected to the Richmond city council in 1975. In 1980 he was elected to the state Assembly as a Democrat and won re-election seven times in the heavily Democratic district. His priorities were education and environmental protection. He chaired the Ways and Means subcommittee on education for six years and served on the Water, Parks and Wildlife Committee for 15 years. He was often the author of bills involving funding for schools and community colleges.

In 1996, unable to seek re-election to the California State Assembly due to term limits, he opted to run for California State Senate. However, Campbell did not run for his area senate seat, which had been made more competitive after the last redistricting. He chose to instead run in a neighboring district, which was much more Democratic, but went on to lose the Democratic primary to Assembly colleague Barbara Lee. He was subsequently appointed to the California Coastal Commission by Assembly Speaker Cruz Bustamante.

== Personal life ==
Campbell was married to his first wife, Diane Marilyn Roark Campbell from 1961 through 1984; they had a daughter and son. Campbell married a second time to his wife Maria Viramontes who had three sons that became Campbell's three additional sons. He was a vegetarian, nonsmoker, and nondrinker. He died on March 27, 2020, from lung cancer that metastasized from breast cancer.
