= Susan Bonilla =

American politician (born 1960)

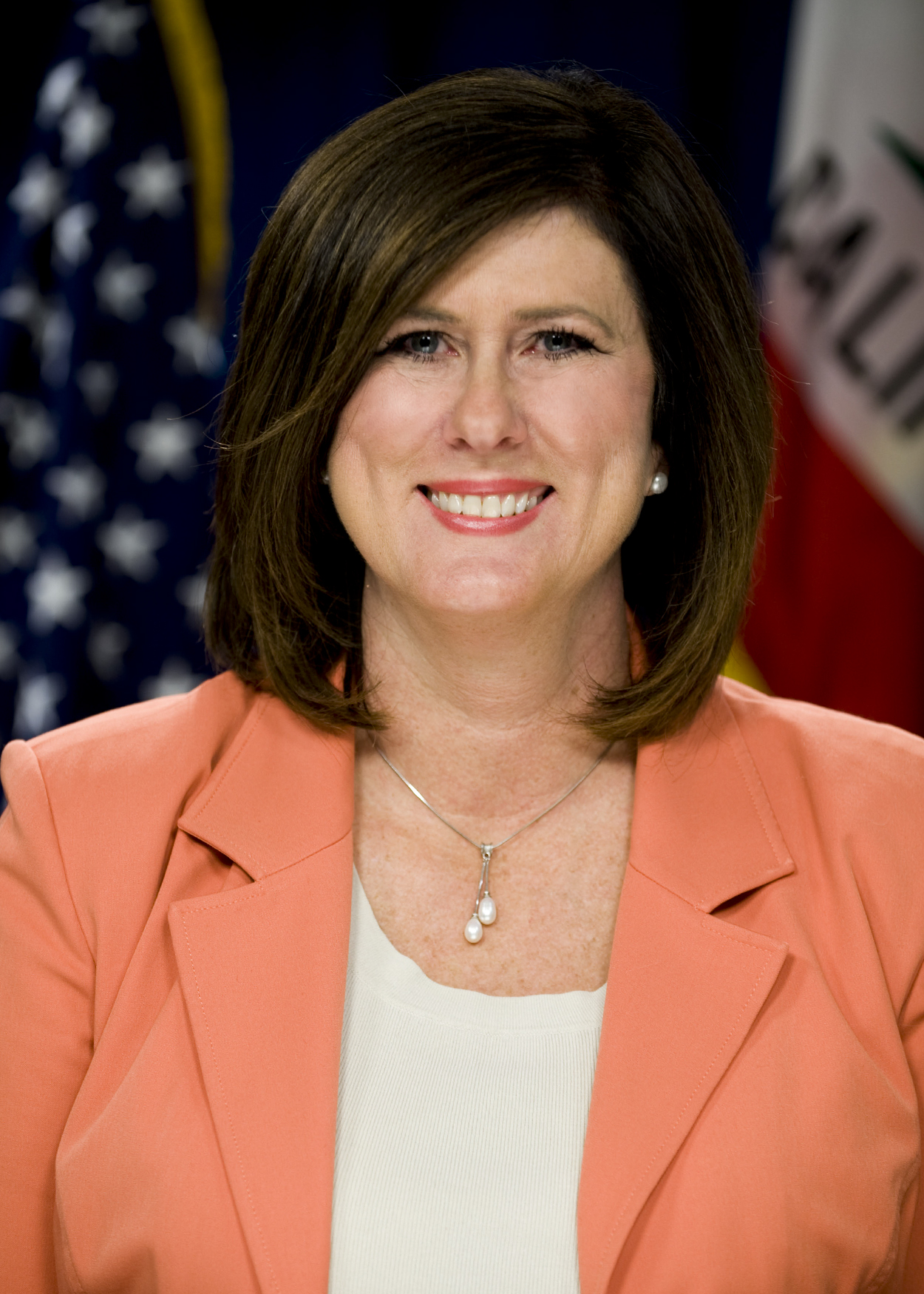

Member of the California State Assembly from the 14th district 11th district (2010–2012)
- In office December 6, 2010 – November 30, 2016
- Preceded by: Tom Torlakson
- Succeeded by: Tim Grayson

Member of the Contra Costa County Board of Supervisors from the 4th District
- In office January 9, 2007 – December 6, 2010
- Preceded by: Mark DeSaulnier
- Succeeded by: Karen Mitchoff

Personal details
- Born: Susan A. Woodward; June 22, 1960 (age 66) Taiwan
- Party: Democratic
- Spouse: John Bonilla
- Education: Azusa Pacific University
- Profession: Teacher

Susan A. Bonilla (née Woodward; born June 22, 1960) is an American politician who served in the California State Assembly, representing the 14th district, encompassing parts of Contra Costa and Solano counties. She is a Democrat. Prior to being elected to the state Assembly, she was a member of the Contra Costa County Board of Supervisors and was mayor of Concord before that.

Due partly to term limits, Bonilla had originally planned to run for Mark DeSaulnier's State Senate seat in 2016, however in November 2014 DeSaulnier resigned to take office in the U.S. House of Representatives. Bonilla ran in a 2015 special election to fill DeSaulnier's seat in California's 7th State Senate district, but lost to Orinda Mayor Steve Glazer in an upset.

In 2017, Bonilla became the California State Director of the Council for a Strong America.

== 2014 California State Assembly ==
California's 14th State Assembly district election, 2014
Primary election
| Party | Candidate | Votes | % |
|---|---|---|---|
| Democratic | Susan Bonilla (incumbent) | 44,644 | 99.1 |
| Republican | Joy D. Delepine (write-in) | 366 | 0.8 |
| No party preference | John Henry Kimack (write-in) | 24 | 0.1 |
| Total votes | | 45,034 | 100.0 |
General election
| Democratic | Susan Bonilla (incumbent) | 69,325 | 68.9 |
| Republican | Joy D. Delepine | 31,298 | 31.1 |
| Total votes | | 100,623 | 100.0 |
| Democratic hold | | | |
