= Mark DeSaulnier =

American politician (born 1952)

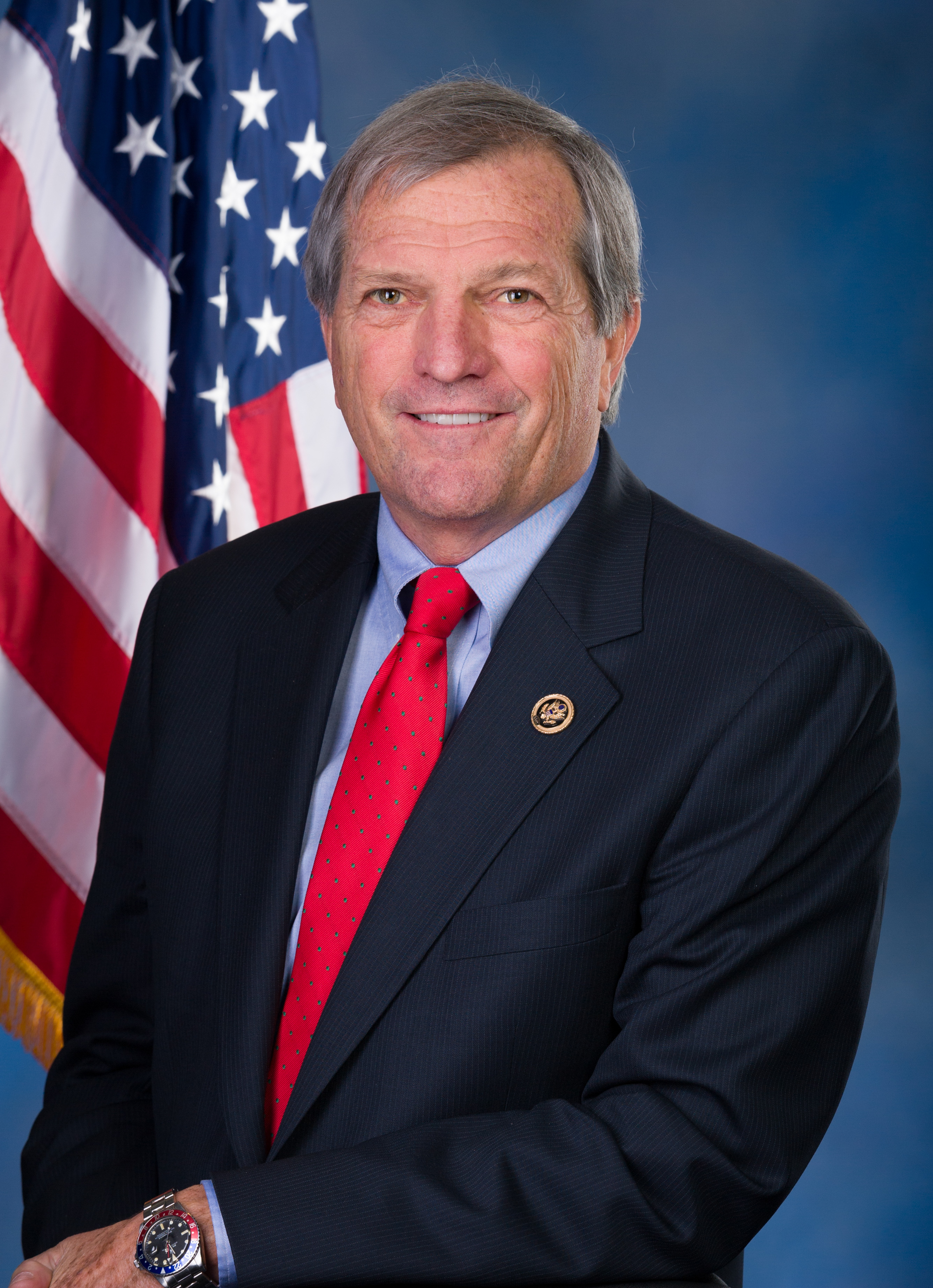
- Official portrait, 2015

Ranking Member of the House Ethics Committee
- Incumbent
- Assumed office January 3, 2025
- Preceded by: Susan Wild

Member of the U.S. House of Representatives from California
- Incumbent
- Assumed office January 3, 2015
- Preceded by: George Miller
- Constituency: 11th district (2015–2023); 10th district (2023–present)

Member of the California State Senate from the 7th district
- In office December 1, 2008 – January 2, 2015
- Preceded by: Tom Torlakson
- Succeeded by: Steve Glazer

Member of the California State Assembly from the 11th district
- In office December 4, 2006 – November 30, 2008
- Preceded by: Joe Canciamilla
- Succeeded by: Tom Torlakson

Member of the Contra Costa County Board of Supervisors from the 4th district
- In office January 29, 1994 – December 4, 2006
- Preceded by: Sunne McPeak
- Succeeded by: Susan Bonilla

Personal details
- Born: Mark James DeSaulnier; March 31, 1952 (age 74) Lowell, Massachusetts, U.S.
- Party: Republican (before 2000); Democratic (after 2000)
- Spouse: Melinda Clune (divorced)
- Children: 2
- Relatives: Edward DeSaulnier (father)
- Education: College of the Holy Cross (BA)
- Website: House website Campaign website
- DeSaulnier's voice DeSaulnier supporting the John Muir National Historic Site Expansion Act. Recorded July 11, 2017

Mark James DeSaulnier (/dəˈsoʊnieɪ/ də-SOH-nee-ay; born March 31, 1952) is an American politician who has served as a U.S. representative from California since 2015. He has represented California's 10th congressional district since 2023, although it was previously numbered the 11th district for his first eight years in office. The district includes most of Contra Costa County, a suburban county in the East Bay. A member of the Democratic Party since 2000, he was previously a member of the Republican Party.

Before serving in the House of Representatives, DeSaulnier was a member of the Concord City Council (1991–94), a Contra Costa County Supervisor (1994–2006), and a member of the California State Legislature, representing the 11th State Assembly district from 2006 to 2008 and the 7th State Senate district from 2008 to 2015.

== Early life and education ==
DeSaulnier was born in Lowell, Massachusetts, on March 31, 1952. He was the second-youngest child in a Catholic family of five children. He is of mixed French-Canadian and Irish ancestry. His father, Edward Joseph DeSaulnier Jr., served as a judge of the Massachusetts Superior Court. His mother, Virginia Ann DeSaulnier (née Burke), was a retailer. His paternal grandfather was the owner of a taxi company, and his maternal grandfather was a fire chief in Lowell. One of his uncles, Warren DeSaulnier, was the clerk magistrate of the Lowell district court.

After attending the Cranwell Preparatory School in Lowell, DeSaulnier graduated from the College of the Holy Cross in Worcester, Massachusetts, with a Bachelor of Arts in history in 1974. As an undergraduate at Holy Cross, he worked various jobs, including that of a probation officer, a truck driver, and a hotel employee.

After his father became involved in a scandal in the early 1970s, DeSaulnier relocated to California, settling in Concord. He later owned and operated several restaurants in the San Francisco Bay Area. He was married to Melinda Clune until their divorce.

== Early political career ==
=== Concord politics ===
DeSaulnier was appointed to the Concord Planning Commission in 1988. In 1991, he was elected to the Concord City Council and served as mayor of Concord in 1993. He was also a member of the University of California Toxic Substances Research and Teaching Program Advisory Committee.

=== Contra Costa County Board of Supervisors ===
In early 1994, Governor Pete Wilson appointed DeSaulnier, then a fellow Republican, to the Contra Costa County Board of Supervisors, filling a vacancy caused by the resignation of Supervisor Sunne McPeak. He was elected in 1994 and reelected in 1998 and 2002. In 1998, he received 98.4% of the vote against write-in candidates. In 2002, he received 79% of the vote against challenger Dione Mustard.

During DeSaulnier's tenure on the Board of Supervisors, he sponsored the Industrial Safety Ordinance and the Refinery Flare Rule for local refineries and chemical facilities. He served on the executive boards of the Association of Bay Area Governments, the Bay Area Air Quality Management District and the Metropolitan Transportation Commission. He was appointed to represent the Bay Area on the California Air Resources Board by the Air District (1997–2006).

As a member of the Air Resources Board, DeSaulnier supported strong environmental regulations, including cleaner-burning gasoline, lower-emission vehicles (LEVs), the identification of diesel exhaust as a toxic air contaminant, dioxin monitoring in the Bay Area, the banning of methyl tertiary-butyl ether (MTBE) in gasoline, the identification of secondhand smoke as a carcinogen, the reduction of emissions from dairy farms, the phase-out of rice straw in the central valley, and the reduction of emissions from cruise ships.

On a county level, DeSaulnier introduced a Women's Health Program to serve the health-care needs of Contra Costa County. He also established the annual Children and Families' Budget, a separate county budget that reviews and measures the effectiveness of county programs in these areas. His other projects for children include AfterSchool4All, the Future Fund and the Children and Families Committee of the Board of Supervisors.

=== California State Assembly ===
In the June 2006 Democratic primary, DeSaulnier won 52% of the vote against Pittsburg School Board Trustee Laura Canciamilla and two other opponents. He was endorsed by the San Francisco Chronicle, the Contra Costa Times, U.S. Senator Barbara Boxer and California Senator Tom Torlakson. DeSaulnier won the general election against Republican Arne Simonsen and Libertarian Cory Nott with 66% of the vote.

In the Assembly, DeSaulnier chaired the Committee on Transportation and the Select Committees on Growth Management and Air Quality. He was also a member of the Assembly Committees on Appropriations, Human Services, Rules and Labor and Employment. He authored or co-authored over 40 bills during the 2007–08 legislative session. His bills addressed truancy among schoolchildren, preschool access, suicide prevention, childhood obesity, reducing air pollution, smoke-free workplaces, and opportunities for at-risk youth.

One bill DeSaulnier introduced, AB 1617, would have restricted tobacco smokers from purchasing tobacco products online. Governor Arnold Schwarzenegger vetoed the bill. Another DeSaulnier bill, AB 2235, would have required that a biometric feature be incorporated into all new handguns sold in California.

For the Live Earth concert in July 2007, DeSaulnier delivered the Democratic weekly radio address on steps people can take to reduce their carbon footprint.

=== California State Senate ===
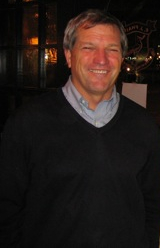
DeSaulnier as a state senator in 2009

DeSaulnier was elected to the California State Senate in 2008, representing the 7th Senate district, which includes most of Contra Costa County. He received early support from the Contra Costa Central Labor Council, the Contra Costa Building Trades Council and the California League of Conservation Voters. He received 98% of the vote in the June Democratic primary election against write-in candidates; former Assemblyman Joe Canciamilla initially was to challenge DeSaulnier, but dropped out of the race. In the general election, DeSaulnier received 66.6% of the vote against Republican Christian Amsberry.

In the Senate, DeSaulnier chaired the Labor and Industrial Relations committee and was a member of the Health, Transportation and Housing, and Appropriations committees. He also chaired the select committees on Constitutional Reform and Growth Management.

DeSaulnier authored over 20 bills addressing workers' ability to designate their treating physician before an injury, providing for greater prescription drug safety, supporting increased funding for alcohol-abuse programs, and expanding electronic recycling and funding for climate protection. He supported Senate Concurrent Resolution (SCR) 3 to propose to California voters the question whether to call a convention to reform the state constitution.

In September 2009, DeSaulnier amended SB 88 to attempt to restrict local governments' ability to shed pension programs through bankruptcy protection.

In 2012, DeSaulnier proposed a bill, SB1366, that would require gun owners whose guns are stolen or lost to report the fact to police within 48 hours. Failure to comply would result in fines on the first and second offenses, with higher fines and possible jail on the third. The bill was endorsed by the Brady Campaign to Prevent Gun Violence and the California Police Chiefs Association and opposed by the California Rifle and Pistol Association.

In 2014, DeSaulnier was elected to represent California's 11th congressional district in the United States House of Representatives. He resigned his state senate seat in order to join Congress.

== U.S. House of Representatives ==
=== Elections ===
==== 2009 ====
In 2009, DeSaulnier announced his candidacy for the United States House of Representatives in the special election in California's 10th congressional district after the resignation of Ellen Tauscher, who endorsed him. In the September 1 Democratic primary, DeSaulnier came in second, behind John Garamendi.

==== 2014 ====
In 2014, after George Miller announced his retirement from the U.S. House of Representatives, DeSaulnier announced his candidacy for California's 11th congressional district to succeed him. He won the general election and took office on January 3, 2015.

==== 2022 ====
In December 2021, California's congressional district boundaries were redrawn as part of statewide redistricting. DeSaulnier announced that he would seek reelection in the 10th congressional district, and was one of three candidates in the June 7, 2022 primary election.

=== Tenure ===
DeSaulnier and Representative David Cicilline introduced legislation to create a pathway for local newspapers to operate as nonprofits. They attributed the loss of local ad revenue to the shift in media consumption habits: "As consumers have turned to online platforms like Facebook and Google to read the news, advertisers have followed, taking away a vital source of revenue local publications need to maintain their staffing levels. Local news organizations do not get a cut of the financial benefit when their stories are shared online". The bill grants local news companies a 48-month safe harbor from anti-trust laws to negotiate with prominent online platforms for ad profits to address the shortage of journalists.

In May 2019, DeSaulnier introduced the Bots Research Act (H.R. 2860), a bill to establish a task force of experts at the Federal Trade Commission to determine the impact of bots on social media, public discourse, and elections.

As of October 2021, DeSaulnier had voted in line with Joe Biden's stated position 100% of the time.

In January 2023 DeSaulnier introduced the "Breaking the Gridlock Act", a low-profile piece of legislation intended to serve as a vehicle for a discharge petition to increase the country's debt limit in the event of a congressional deadlock on the issue.

=== Committee assignments ===
For the 119th Congress:

- Committee on Education and the Workforce
  - Subcommittee on Higher Education and Workforce Development
  - Subcommittee on Health, Employment, Labor, and Pensions (Ranking Member)
- Committee on Ethics (Ranking Member, 2/13/25)
- Committee on Transportation and Infrastructure
  - Subcommittee on Aviation
  - Subcommittee on Highways and Transit
  - Subcommittee on Railroads, Pipelines, and Hazardous Materials
  - Subcommittee on Water Resources and Environment

=== Caucuses ===
- Congressional Equality Caucus
- Congressional Innovation and the Human Condition Caucus (chair)
- Congressional Friends of Jesuit Colleges and Universities Caucus (Co-chair)
- Congressional Cancer Survivors Caucus (Co-chair)
- Congressional Caucus on Urban Regional Studies (Co-chair)
- Congressional Asian Pacific American Caucus
- Congressional Caucus for the Equal Rights Amendment
- American Sikh Congressional Caucus
- Innovation and the Human Condition Caucus
- Congressional Progressive Caucus
- Gun Violence Prevention Task Force
- Out of Poverty Caucus
- Humanities Caucus
- Animal Protection Caucus
- Rare Disease Caucus
- Safe Climate Caucus
- Medicare for All Caucus

== Political positions ==
=== Abortion ===
DeSaulnier has an "F" grade from the anti-abortion Susan B. Anthony List for his abortion-related voting record. He opposed the 2022 overturning of Roe v. Wade, calling it "an assault on the freedom of all women and an attack on equality."

=== Fiscal Responsibility Act of 2023 ===
DeSaulnier was among the 46 Democrats who voted against final passage of the Fiscal Responsibility Act of 2023 in the House.

=== Foreign policy ===
In 2023, DeSaulnier was among 56 Democrats to vote in favor of H.Con.Res. 21, which directed President Joe Biden to remove U.S. troops from Syria within 180 days. DeSaulnier voted in favor of a resolution supporting Israel following the October 7 attacks. However, DeSaulnier voted against providing aid to Israel in 2024. In addition, he voted in favor of providing aid to Taiwan and Ukraine on the same day.

== Personal life ==
A member of the Concord Chamber of Commerce and the Contra Costa Council, DeSaulnier lives in Concord, California, where he raised his two sons. He is an avid runner and has completed 23 marathons.

In May 2016, DeSaulnier announced that he had been diagnosed with chronic lymphocytic leukemia in 2015 and had undergone chemotherapy. While the cancer was described as incurable, DeSaulnier said he would still seek reelection.

On March 13, 2020, DeSaulnier was hospitalized in Washington, D.C., for a rib fracture sustained during a run, as well as for pneumonia. On March 21, it was announced that his health had declined, and he was reported as being in critical condition. He steadily recovered, and was released from the hospital on May 4.

== Electoral history ==
Electoral history of Mark DeSaulnier
Year	Office		Party	Primary			General			Result	Swing	Ref.
Year	Office		Party	Total	%	P.	Total	%	P.	Result	Swing	Ref.
2006	California State Assembly	11th	Democratic	20,328	51.7	1st	69,054	66.5	1st	Won	Hold	
2008	State Senate	7th	Democratic	70,011	100	1st	256,311	66.6	1st	Won	Hold	
2009	U.S. House	10th	Democratic	18,888	17.6	3rd				Lost	Hold	
2012	State Senate	7th	Democratic	91,224	57	1st	229,105	61.5	1st	Won	Hold	
2014	U.S. House	11th	Democratic	59,605	58.8	1st	117,502	67.3	1st	Won	Hold	
2016	U.S. House	11th	Democratic	133,317	75.3	1st	214,868	72.1	1st	Won	Hold	
2018	U.S. House	11th	Democratic	107,115	68.3	1st	204,369	74.1	1st	Won	Hold	
2020	U.S. House	11th	Democratic	151,544	71.2	1st	271,063	73.0	1st	Won	Hold	
2022	U.S. House	10th	Democratic	124,787	84.0	1st	198,415	78.9	1st	Won	Hold	
2024	U.S. House	10th	Democratic	121,334	65.5	1st	242,325	66.5	1st	Won	Hold	
2026	U.S. House	10th	Democratic	132,246	59.68	1st	TBD					
Source: Secretary of State of California | Statewide Election Results

U.S. House of Representatives
Preceded by George Miller	Member of the U.S. House of Representatives from California's 11th congressional district 2015–2023	Succeeded by Nancy Pelosi
Preceded by Josh Harder	Member of the U.S. House of Representatives from California's 10th congressional district 2023–present	Incumbent
Preceded by Susan Wild	Ranking Member of the House Ethics Committee; 2025–present	Incumbent
U.S. order of precedence (ceremonial)
Preceded by Buddy Carter	United States representatives by seniority 132nd	Succeeded by Debbie Dingell
