= Jim Frazier (politician) =

American politician

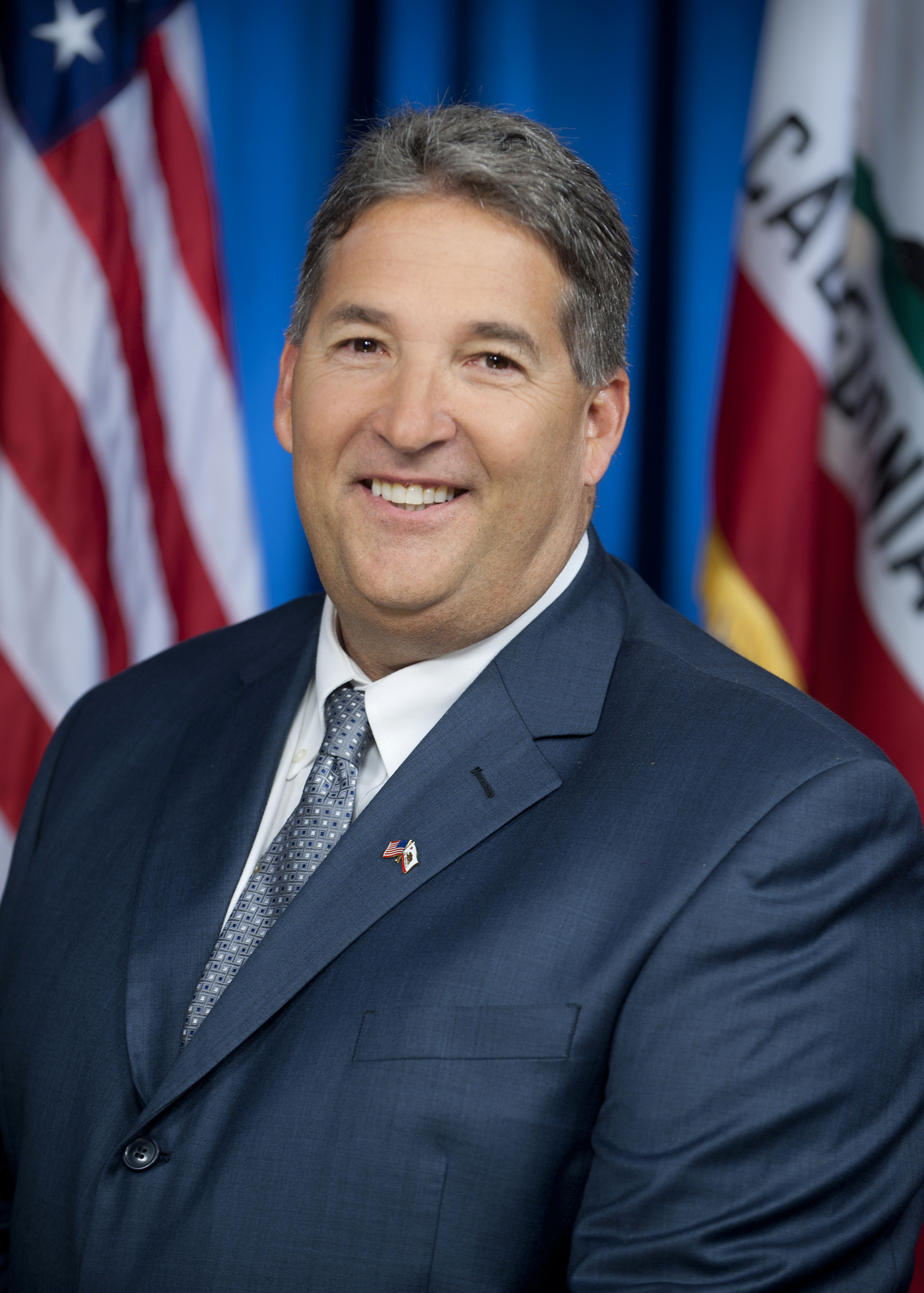

Member of the California State Assembly from the 11th district
- In office December 3, 2012 – December 31, 2021
- Preceded by: new district
- Succeeded by: Lori Wilson

Personal details
- Born: James Leroy Frazier, Jr. May 4, 1959 (age 66) Martinez, California, U.S.
- Party: Democratic
- Spouse: Janet Frazier (divorced)
- Children: 2
- Profession: Small businessman

James L. Frazier Jr. (born May 4, 1959) is an American politician who served in the California State Assembly. He is a Democrat who previously represented the 11th Assembly District, which encompasses Solano County, eastern Contra Costa County, and a portion of rural Sacramento County.

Prior to being elected to the Assembly in 2012, he was an Oakley City Councilmember and Mayor.

== Legislative career ==
During his first term, Frazier's legislation focused on roadway safety and infrastructure. He authored Assembly Bill 1113, concerning provisional driver's licenses, which sought to strengthen teen driver-licensing programs and improve the safety of the roadways. He also authored Assembly Bill 417, which lessened the processes needed to authorize bike lanes in urbanized areas. He authored Assembly Bill 513, which expands the use of rubberized asphalt (made from waste tires) in roads and other transportation projects. And he authored Assembly Bill 1336, which provides the state with added enforcement powers necessary to ensure that workers are paid mandated wages.

During the 2014-15 legislative session, Frazier served as Chair of the Assembly Transportation Committee. In this role, he contributed to the defeat of a bill seeking to explicitly add representation from disadvantage communities to the California Transportation Commission, stating that "the bill would elevate disadvantaged communities and their interests above all others, and we can’t have that."

Frazier resigned from the State Assembly on December 31, 2021, to pursue opportunities in the transportation sector.

== 2014 California State Assembly ==
California's 11th State Assembly district election, 2014
Primary election
Party	Candidate	Votes	%
Democratic	Jim Frazier (incumbent)	30,893	60.7
Republican	Alex Henthorn	20,002	39.3
Total votes		50,895	100.0
General election
Democratic	Jim Frazier (incumbent)	54,044	59.7
Republican	Alex Henthorn	36,475	40.3
Total votes		90,519	100.0
Democratic hold			

== 2016 California State Assembly ==
California's 11th State Assembly district election, 2016
Primary election
Party	Candidate	Votes	%
Democratic	Jim Frazier (incumbent)	62,952	65.9
Republican	Dave Miller	32,545	34.1
Total votes		95,497	100.0
General election
Democratic	Jim Frazier (incumbent)	111,592	64.2
Republican	Dave Miller	62,227	35.8
Total votes		173,819	100.0
Democratic hold			

== 2018 California State Assembly ==
California's 11th State Assembly district election, 2018
Primary election
Party	Candidate	Votes	%
Democratic	Jim Frazier (incumbent)	39,095	48.3
Republican	Lisa Romero	30,623	37.8
Democratic	Diane Stewart	11,224	13.9
Total votes		80,942	100.0
General election
Democratic	Jim Frazier (incumbent)	96,254	61.5
Republican	Lisa Romero	60,335	38.5
Total votes		156,589	100.0
Democratic hold			

== 2020 California State Assembly ==
2020 California's 11th State Assembly district election
Primary election
Party	Candidate	Votes	%
Democratic	Jim Frazier (incumbent)	74,950	
Republican	Debra Schwab (write in)		
Total votes			100%
General election
Democratic	Jim Frazier (incumbent)		
Republican	Debra Schwab		
Total votes			
