= California's 11th State Assembly district =

American legislative district

Current assemblymember
Lori Wilson; D–Suisun City
- Population (2010) • Voting age • Citizen voting age: 466,986; 341,465; 285,055
- Demographics: 44.10% White; 13.22% Black; 27.55% Latino; 11.39% Asian; 1.01% Native American; 0.87% Hawaiian/Pacific Islander; 0.43% other; 1.42% remainder of multiracial
- Registered voters: 252,870
- Registration: 46.55% Democratic; 25.00% Republican; 23.56% No party preference

California's 11th State Assembly district is one of 80 California State Assembly districts. It is currently represented by Democrat Lori Wilson of Suisun City.

== District profile ==
The district is centered on the Sacramento–San Joaquin River Delta. It includes the far northeastern corner of the San Francisco Bay Area and the southwestern corner of the Sacramento Valley. The Sacramento and San Joaquin rivers converge here, and a significant part of the district is low-lying and/or reclaimed.

Contra Costa County – 5.66%

- Discovery Bay
- Oakley

Sacramento County – 0.06%

- 965 assorted rural people

All of Solano County

- Benicia
- Dixon
- Fairfield
- Rio Vista
- Suisun City
- Vacaville
- Vallejo

== Election results from statewide races ==
Year	Office	Results
2021	Recall	No 59.9 – 40.1%
2020	President	Biden 60.8 - 36.2%
2018	Governor	Newsom 57.6 – 42.4%
2018	Senator	Feinstein 51.9 – 48.1%
2016	President	Clinton 58.9 – 35.2%
2016	Senator	Harris 63.2 – 36.8%
2014	Governor	Brown 60.2 – 39.8%
2012	President	Obama 60.9 – 36.8%
2012	Senator	Feinstein 63.3 – 36.7%

== List of assembly members representing the district ==
Due to redistricting, the 11th district has been moved around different parts of the state. The current iteration resulted from the 2021 redistricting by the California Citizens Redistricting Commission.

Assembly members	Party	Years served	Counties represented	Notes
Whit Henley	Democratic	January 5, 1885 – January 3, 1887	Mendocino	
Philo Handy	Republican	January 3, 1887 – January 7, 1889	Mendocino	
J. H. Seawell	Democratic	January 7, 1889 – January 5, 1891	Mendocino	
George A. Sturtevant	Republican	January 5, 1891 – January 2, 1893	Mendocino	
Isaac W. Jacobs	Democratic	January 2, 1893 – January 7, 1895	Yolo	
H. W. Laugenour	Democratic	January 7, 1895 – January 4, 1897	Yolo	
A. W. North	Republican	January 4, 1897 – January 2, 1899	Yolo	
George Washington Pierce	Republican	January 2, 1899 – January 1, 1901	Yolo	
J. F. Chiles	Democratic	January 1, 1901 – January 5, 1903	Yolo	
Charles H. McKenney	Republican	January 5, 1903 – January 7, 1907	Amador, Alpine, Calaveras, Mono	
George F. Snyder	Democratic	January 7, 1907 – January 4, 1909	Amador, Alpine, Calaveras, Mono	
Edgar Backus Moore	Republican	January 4, 1909 – January 2, 1911	Amador, Alpine, Calaveras, Mono	
Ferdinand G. Stevenot	Republican	January 2, 1911 – January 6, 1913	Calaveras	
James M. Palmer	Democratic	January 6, 1913 – January 4, 1915	Napa, Lake	
Bismarck Bruck	Republican	January 4, 1915 – January 3, 1921	Napa, Lake	
Frank Coombs	Republican	January 3, 1921 – January 5, 1931	Napa	
Roy J. Nielsen	Republican	January 5, 1931 – January 2, 1933	Sacramento	
Forsythe Charles Clowdsley	Democratic	January 2, 1933 – January 7, 1935	San Joaquin	
Dana P. Eicke	Democratic	January 7, 1935 – January 27, 1935	San Joaquin	Died in office from heart attack.
Vacant		January 27, 1935 – March 25, 1935	San Joaquin	
Charles M. Weber III	Republican	March 25, 1935 – January 8, 1951	San Joaquin	He was sworn in after winning the special election to fill the vaccany of Dana Eicke. He also switched his party from Independent to Republican while in office.
Howard Q. Parker	Democratic	January 8, 1951 – January 5, 1953	San Joaquin	
Salathiel Charles Masterson II	Democratic	January 5, 1953 – January 24, 1960	Contra Costa	Resigned from the State Assembly.
Vacant		January 24, 1960 – January 2, 1961	Contra Costa	
John T. Knox	Democratic	January 2, 1961 – November 30, 1980	Contra Costa	
Robert Campbell	Democratic	December 1, 1980 – November 30, 1996	Contra Costa	
Tom Torlakson	Democratic	December 2, 1996 – November 30, 2000	Contra Costa	
Joe Canciamilla	Democratic	December 4, 2000 – November 30, 2006	Contra Costa	
Mark DeSaulnier	Democratic	December 4, 2006 – November 30, 2008	Contra Costa	
Tom Torlakson	Democratic	December 1, 2008 – November 30, 2010	Contra Costa	
Susan Bonilla	Democratic	December 6, 2010 – November 30, 2012	Contra Costa	
Jim Frazier	Democratic	December 3, 2012 – December 31, 2021	Contra Costa, Sacramento, Solano	Resigned from the State Assembly.
Vacant		December 31, 2021 – April 6, 2022	Contra Costa, Sacramento, Solano	
Lori Wilson	Democratic	April 6, 2022 – present	Contra Costa, Sacramento, Solano	

== Election results (1990-present) ==
=== 2024 ===
2024 California State Assembly 11th district election
Primary election
Party	Candidate	Votes	%
Democratic	Lori Wilson (incumbent)	50,129	50.2
Republican	Dave Ennis	26,078	26.1
Republican	Wanda Wallis	14,641	14.7
Democratic	Jeffrey Flack	8,988	9.0
Total votes		99,836	100.0
General election
Democratic	Lori Wilson (incumbent)	124,283	58.8
Republican	Dave Ennis	87,156	41.2
Total votes		211,439	100.0
Democratic hold			

=== 2022 ===
2022 California State Assembly 11th district election
Primary election
Party	Candidate	Votes	%
Democratic	Lori Wilson (incumbent)	52,139	64.2
No party preference	Jenny Leilani Callison	28,992	35.7
No party preference	James Berg (write-in)	23	0.0
Total votes		81,154	100.0
General election
Democratic	Lori Wilson (incumbent)	85,599	59.2
No party preference	Jenny Leilani Callison	58,889	40.8
Total votes		144,488	100.0
Democratic hold			

=== 2022 (special) ===
2022 California State Assembly 11th district special election Vacancy resulting from the resignation of Jim Frazier
Primary election
Party	Candidate	Votes	%
Democratic	Lori Wilson	30,243	93.9
Republican	Erik Elness (write-in)	1,975	6.1
Total votes		32,218	100.0
Democratic hold			

=== 2020 ===
2020 California State Assembly 11th district election
Primary election
Party	Candidate	Votes	%
Democratic	Jim Frazier (incumbent)	83,125	98.8
Republican	Debra Schwab (write-in)	1,044	1.2
Total votes		84,169	100.0
General election
Democratic	Jim Frazier (incumbent)	149,304	64.7
Republican	Debra Schwab	81,374	35.3
Total votes		230,678	100.0
Democratic hold			

=== 2018 ===
2018 California State Assembly 11th district election
Primary election
Party	Candidate	Votes	%
Democratic	Jim Frazier (incumbent)	39,095	48.3
Republican	Lisa Romero	30,623	37.8
Democratic	Diane Stewart	11,224	13.9
Total votes		80,942	100.0
General election
Democratic	Jim Frazier (incumbent)	96,254	61.5
Republican	Lisa Romero	60,335	38.5
Total votes		156,589	100.0
Democratic hold			

=== 2016 ===
2016 California State Assembly 11th district election
Primary election
Party	Candidate	Votes	%
Democratic	Jim Frazier (incumbent)	62,952	65.9
Republican	Dave Miller	32,545	34.1
Total votes		95,497	100.0
General election
Democratic	Jim Frazier (incumbent)	111,592	64.2
Republican	Dave Miller	62,227	35.8
Total votes		173,819	100.0
Democratic hold			

=== 2014 ===
2014 California State Assembly 11th district election
Primary election
Party	Candidate	Votes	%
Democratic	Jim Frazier (incumbent)	30,893	60.7
Republican	Alex Henthorn	20,002	39.3
Total votes		50,895	100.0
General election
Democratic	Jim Frazier (incumbent)	54,044	59.7
Republican	Alex Henthorn	36,475	40.3
Total votes		90,519	100.0
Democratic hold			

=== 2012 ===
2012 California State Assembly 11th district election
Primary election
Party	Candidate	Votes	%
Republican	Mike Hudson	21,234	31.7
Democratic	Jim Frazier	18,846	28.1
Democratic	Patricia Hernández	11,844	17.7
No party preference	Len Augustine	10,048	15.0
Democratic	Gene Gantt	3,827	5.9
Democratic	Charles Kingeter	1,159	1.7
Total votes		66,958	100.0
General election
Democratic	Jim Frazier	96,893	62.0
Republican	Mike Hudson	59,420	38.0
Total votes		156,313	100.0
Democratic hold			

=== 2010 ===
2010 California State Assembly 11th district election
Party	Candidate	Votes	%
Democratic	Susan Bonilla	81,869	69.0
Republican	Julie Craven	36,864	31.0
Total votes		118,733	100.0
Democratic hold			

=== 2008 ===
2008 California State Assembly 11th district election
Party	Candidate	Votes	%
Democratic	Tom Torlakson	117,773	73.7
Republican	Elizabeth Hansen	42,023	26.3
Total votes		159,796	100.0
Democratic hold			

=== 2006 ===
2006 California State Assembly 11th district election
Party	Candidate	Votes	%
Democratic	Mark DeSaulnier	69,054	66.5
Republican	Arne Simonsen	31,048	29.9
Libertarian	Cory Nott	3,743	3.6
Total votes		104,845	100.0
Democratic hold			

=== 2004 ===
2004 California State Assembly 11th district election
Party	Candidate	Votes	%
Democratic	Joe Canciamilla (incumbent)	95,912	66.8
Republican	Paul Santiago	40,438	28.2
Libertarian	Frank Manske	7,162	5.0
Total votes		143,512	100.0
Democratic hold			

=== 2002 ===
2002 California State Assembly 11th district election
Party	Candidate	Votes	%
Democratic	Joe Cancimalla (incumbent)	61,969	65.0
Republican	Jan Leslie Denny	29,741	31.1
Libertarian	Frank Manske	3,752	3.9
Total votes		95,462	100.0
Democratic hold			

=== 2000 ===
2000 California State Assembly 11th district election
Party	Candidate	Votes	%
Democratic	Joe Canciamilla	98,728	66.9
Republican	James Diaz	42,523	28.8
Libertarian	Frank Manske	6,257	4.2
Total votes		147,508	100.0
Democratic hold			

=== 1998 ===
1998 California State Assembly 11th district election
Party	Candidate	Votes	%
Democratic	Tom Torlakson (incumbent)	80,323	69.0
Republican	Allen D. Payton	36,046	31.0
Total votes		118,369	100.0
Democratic hold			

=== 1996 ===
1996 California State Assembly 11th district election
Party	Candidate	Votes	%
Democratic	Tom Torlakson (incumbent)	81,820	60.0
Republican	Bill Maxfield	42,137	30.9
Natural Law	Eleanor V. Sheppard	12,375	9.1
Total votes		136,332	100.0
Democratic hold			

=== 1994 ===
1994 California State Assembly 11th district election
Party	Candidate	Votes	%
Democratic	Robert Campbell (incumbent)	86,426	82.7
Peace and Freedom	Amanda Coughlan	18,098	17.3
Total votes		104,524	100.0
Democratic hold			

=== 1992 ===
1992 California State Assembly 11th district election
Party	Candidate	Votes	%
Democratic	Robert Campbell (incumbent)	114,692	99.1
No party	Jam L. Denny (write-in)	900	0.8
No party	Wilbert E. Cossel (write-in)	113	0.1
Total votes		115,705	100.0
Democratic hold			

=== 1990 ===
1990 California State Assembly 11th district election
Party	Candidate	Votes	%
Democratic	Robert Campbell (incumbent)	72,567	100.0
Total votes		72,567	100.0
Democratic hold			

== See also ==
- California State Assembly
- California State Assembly districts
- Districts in California
