= Margaret Holtrust =

Dutch-American political scientist

- Born: December 15, 1925; Genemuiden, The Netherlands
- Died: May 8, 2011 (aged 85); Fullerton, California
- Education: University of San Francisco
- Occupations: Political scientist, missionary
- Employer: Golden West College

Margaret Holtrust (December 15, 1925 – May 8, 2011) was a Dutch-American political scientist as well as a Christian missionary.

== History ==
Margaret Holtrust was born in the Dutch town of Genemuiden in 1925. She was first hired as a social science professor in 1966 at Golden West College in Huntington Beach, California. Later, throughout the 1970s and 1980s, Holtrust taught political science at Golden West College. In 1978, Holtrust published a textbook titled Political Science.

== Activism ==
Holtrust organized Golden West College's first Earth Day celebrations in 1970, which was the year of Earth Day's founding. In 1979, Holtrust was awarded for her community organizing at Golden West College. In her political science lectures, Margaret Holtrust was vocally critical of former Republican congressman Robert Badham. Throughout the 1970s and 1980s, Holtrust organized Golden West College's political science lecture series, featuring speakers such as former 1974 California gubernatorial candidate Herbert Hafif and former Livermore mayor and California assemblyman Gilbert Marguth.

In 1981, the Los Angeles Times wrote that Margaret Holtrust was known "for offering extra credit to students who became involved in the political process."

== Personal life ==
Margaret Holtrust was the niece of Egbert J. Holtrust, founder of the Dutch-American soup company Fino Factories & California Soups. Margaret Holtrust's nephew Steve Holtrust was killed in Honduras in 2011.
