= 2009 California's 10th congressional district special election =

- November 3, 2009
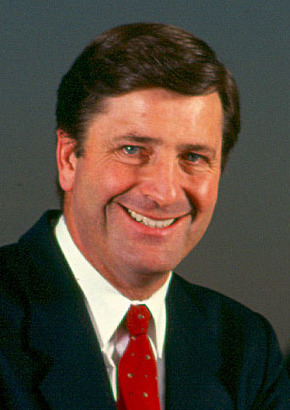

Nominee	John Garamendi	David Harmer
Party	Democratic	Republican
Popular vote	72,817	59,017
Percentage	52.8%	42.8%
- Runoff county results Garamendi: 40–50% 50–60% Harmer: 50–60%
Representative before election
Ellen Tauscher
Democratic
Elected Representative
John Garamendi
Democratic

California's 10th congressional district special election, 2009 was held on November 3, 2009, to fill the vacancy caused in California's 10th congressional district by the resignation of Ellen Tauscher. Democratic Party candidate John Garamendi won against Republican opponent David Harmer.

== Background ==
On May 5, 2009, President Barack Obama nominated Democratic Representative Ellen Tauscher for the position of Undersecretary of State for Arms Control and International Security. She was confirmed by the United States Senate on June 26 and subsequently resigned from her congressional seat.

Following her resignation, Governor Arnold Schwarzenegger called a special election. An open primary among candidates of all political parties took place on September 1, 2009. If a candidates received a majority of the vote in the primary, that candidate would wins the seat without an additional election. As that didn't occur, the general election took place on November 3, 2009, between the candidates with the most votes for each party.

== Candidates ==
The following individuals appeared in the certified list of candidates and the certified list of write-in candidates published by the Secretary of State of California, and were thus eligible to receive votes in the special primary election.

=== American Independent ===
- Jerome "Jerry" Denham, an insurance agent

=== Democratic ===
- Tiffany René Estrella Attwood, a write-in candidate
- Joan Buchanan, the State Assemblymember from the 15th district
- Mark DeSaulnier, the State Senator from the 7th district who was endorsed by Tauscher as her successor
- John Garamendi, the Lieutenant Governor
- Adriel Hampton, a Government 2.0 blogger and investigator for the San Francisco City Attorney
- Anthony Woods, an Iraq War Veteran and economic policy analyst

=== Green ===
- Jeremy Cloward, a community college instructor

=== Peace and Freedom ===
- Mary C. McIlroy

=== Republican ===
- Chris Bunch, a small business owner
- Gary W. Clift, a retired police officer
- David Harmer, an independent businessman
- Mark Loos, a small business owner
- David Peterson, an accountability system owner
- John Toth, a physician

== Polling ==
=== General election ===
Poll source	Date	John Garamendi	David Harmer	Other
Survey USA	October 26–28, 2009	50%	40%	6%

== Results ==
=== Primary ===
Since no candidate won a majority in the September 1, 2009, open primary, the candidates with the top votes for each party advanced to the special general election. Garamendi won more votes than any other Democrat and Harmer more than any Republican. Denham, Cloward, and McIlroy were the only candidates from their parties so they advanced to the general election by default.

California's 10th congressional district special primary, 2009
Party	Candidate	Votes	%
Democratic	John Garamendi	27,580	25.70
Republican	David Harmer	22,582	21.05
Democratic	Mark DeSaulnier	18,888	17.60
Democratic	Joan Buchanan	12,896	12.02
Democratic	Anthony Woods	9,388	8.75
Republican	Chris Bunch	4,871	4.54
Republican	Gary Clift	4,158	3.88
Republican	John Toth	3,340	3.11
Republican	David Peterson	1,671	1.56
Green	Jeremy Cloward	552	0.51
Republican	Mark Loos	418	0.39
Democratic	Adriel Hampton	376	0.35
American Independent	Jerome Denham	309	0.29
Peace and Freedom	Mary McIlroy	272	0.25
Democratic	Tiffany Attwood (write-in)	2	0.00
Total votes		107,303	100.00
Turnout			29.39

=== General ===
California's 10th congressional district special election, 2009
Party	Candidate	Votes	%
Democratic	John Garamendi	72,817	52.85
Republican	David Harmer	59,017	42.83
Green	Jeremy Cloward	2,515	1.83
Peace and Freedom	Mary McIlroy	1,846	1.34
American Independent	Jerome Denham	1,591	1.15
Total votes		137,786	100.00
Turnout			35.33
Democratic hold			

==== By county ====
County	John Garamendi Democratic		David Harmer Republican		All others		Margin		Total votes cast
County	#	%	#	%	#	%	#	%	Total votes cast
Alameda (part)	6,811	44.5%	8,039	52.5%	468	3.0%	-1,228	-8.0%	15,318
Contra Costa (part)	54,943	54.6%	41,486	41.3%	4,115	4.1%	13,457	13.3%	100,544
Sacramento (part)	241	48.0%	232	46.2%	29	5.8%	9	1.8%	502
Solano (part)	10,822	50.5%	9,260	43.2%	1,340	6.3%	1,562	7.3%	21,422
Totals	72,817	52.8%	59,017	42.8%	5,952	4.3%	13,800	10.0%	137,786
