= Senator Rainey =

Senator Rainey may refer to:

- Joseph Rainey (1832–1887), South Carolina State Senate
- Richard Rainey (fl. 1980s–1990s), California State Senate
