= Thomas Fraser (California politician) =

Canadian-born American politician (1833–1902)

27th President pro tempore of the California State Senate
- In office January 5, 1891 – March 25, 1891
- Preceded by: Stephen M. White
- Succeeded by: R.B. Carpenter

Member of the California State Senate
- In office January 2, 1889 – January 2, 1893
- Preceded by: A.P. Hall
- Succeeded by: Henry C. Gesford
- Constituency: 7th district
- In office January 8, 1883 – January 5, 1885
- Preceded by: Stephen L. Spencer
- Succeeded by: William H. Brown
- Constituency: 23rd district
- In office 1873–1879
- Constituency: 15th district

Member of the California State Assembly
- In office 1873–1875
- Constituency: 23rd district
- In office 1863–1865
- Constituency: 15th district

Personal details
- Born: Thomas Fraser; September 6, 1833 Nova Scotia, Canada
- Died: July 1, 1902 (age 68) Sacramento, California, U.S.
- Party: Republican; Union
- Spouse: Mary E. Edner
- Children: 5

Thomas Fraser (September 6, 1833 – July 1, 1902) was a Canadian-born American politician who served in the California State Assembly and California State Senate as a Republican. He also served a term as President pro tempore of the Senate.

== Biography ==
Fraser was born on September 6, 1833 in Nova Scotia, Canada. He arrived in California before 1858 and settled in Indian Diggings in El Dorado County. Fraser served a term on the El Dorado County Board of Supervisors, and was elected to the California State Assembly in 1863 to represent the 15th district as a member of the Union Party. Fraser was then elected to the State Senate's 15th district in 1873, the Assembly's 23rd district in 1879 and re-elected in 1880, and to the State Senate again representing the 23rd district in 1882 and the 7th district in 1888 all as a Republican. In 1891, Fraser was the 27th President pro tempore of the California State Senate.

Fraser was also Deputy State Librarian and was Register of the United States Land Office, a job he held until his death. Fraser died of Bright's disease complications in Sacramento on July 1, 1902.

== Personal life ==
Fraser was married to Mary E. Edner and had five children. He was a Freemason, Odd Fellow, and member of the Ancient Order of United Workmen.

Preceded by Stephen M. White	President pro tempore of the California State Senate; 1891	Succeeded by R.B. Carpenter
