= Daniel Boatwright =

American politician (1930–2012)

Member of the California Senate from the 7th district
- In office December 1, 1980 - November 30, 1996
- Preceded by: John A. Nejedly
- Succeeded by: Richard Rainey

Member of the California State Assembly from the 10th district
- In office January 1, 1973 - December 1, 1980
- Preceded by: James W. Dent
- Succeeded by: William P. Baker

Personal details
- Born: January 29, 1930 Harrison, Arkansas, U.S.
- Died: April 27, 2012 (aged 82) Clayton, California, U.S.
- Party: Democratic
- Spouse(s): Gina Hilbert (d.) Tersea Boatwright (m. 1984)
- Children: 3
- Education: Vallejo Junior College; University of California, Berkeley

Military service
- Allegiance: United States
- Branch/service: United States Army
- Unit: 7th Infantry Division
- Battles/wars: Korean War

Daniel Eugene Boatwright (January 29, 1930 – April 27, 2012) was a Democratic politician from the state of California. Boatwright was a longtime state legislator from Concord, California, a suburb in the San Francisco Bay Area.

Born in Harrison, Arkansas, Boatwright served in the U.S. Army during the Korean War. He graduated from the University of California at Berkeley and got a law degree.

== Pre-legislative career ==
Boatwright honorably served his country in the army in the Korean War. His service included action in the Battle at Chosin Reservoir (November 27, 1950 to December 13, 1950) in which 1,029 American soldiers were killed, 4,582 were wounded and 4,894 were missing. It was the worst battle of the Korean war.

Boatwright worked as a Contra Costa County Deputy District Attorney from 1960 to 1963. During this period, Boatwright was lead attorney in dozens of jury trials without losing a single case. He still holds the record for the most consecutive cases won in Contra Costa County. He entered elective politics by serving on the Concord City Council from 1966 until 1972 and served as Mayor from 1966 until 1968.

== Legislative career ==
In 1972, he was elected to the California State Assembly and was reelected until 1980. He became Chairman of the Assembly Appropriations Committee, a very influential post. In 1980, he was elected to the California State Senate. He quickly became popular in his suburban district and was not seriously challenged for reelection. During the 1980s, he served as chairman of the powerful Senate Appropriations Committee.

In the state legislature, Boatwright was considered a political moderate who occasionally broke with party orthodoxy and got along well with his Republican colleagues. However, this fit well with his constituents. But his career was cut short when California voters passed term limits in 1990. As a result, Boatwright was forced to retire from the Senate in 1996.

== Post-legislative career ==
After leaving the legislature, Boatwright became General Counsel for Sacramento Advocates, a prominent California lobbying firm.

== Death ==
Boatwright died on April 27, 2012, at the age of 82. "Dan Boatwright was a dedicated legislator, an early proponent of a national balanced budget amendment and a very good representative of Contra Costa County. I enjoyed his friendship and I will miss him," California Governor Jerry Brown said following his death.
