= Clayton, California =

City in California, United States

- City
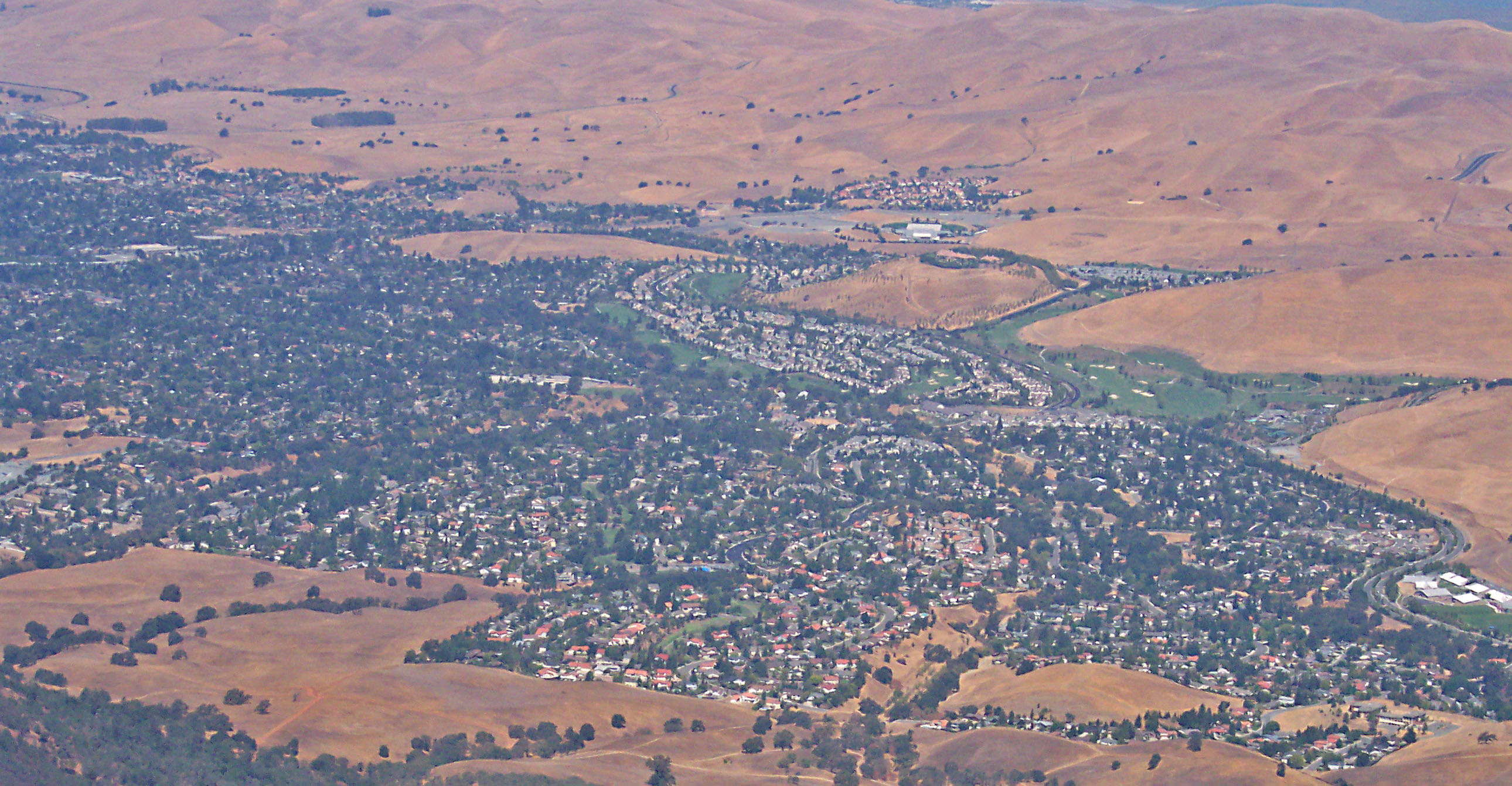
- Parts of Clayton as seen from Mt. Diablo in Summer 2005

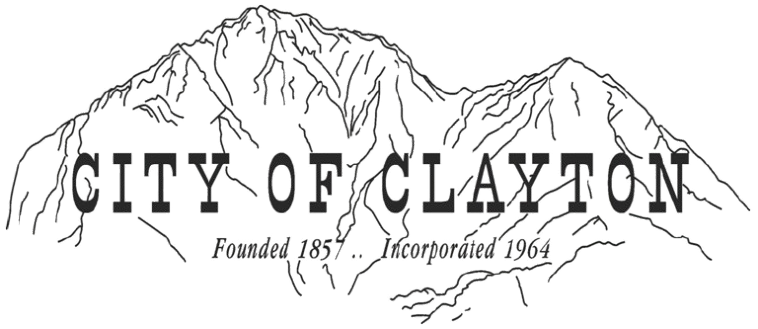
- Logo
- Interactive map of Clayton, California
- Location in the United States
- Coordinates: 37°56′28″N 121°56′09″W
- Country: United States
- State: California
- County: Contra Costa
- Incorporated: March 18, 1964

Government
  - Mayor: Jeff Wan
  - State Senator: Tim Grayson
  - State Assembly: Anamarie Avila Farias (D)
  - U. S. Congress: Mark DeSaulnier (D)

Area
  - Total: 3.84 sq mi (9.95 km^{2})
  - Land: 3.84 sq mi (9.95 km^{2})
  - Water: 0 sq mi (0.00 km^{2}) 0%
- Elevation: 390 ft (120 m)

Population (2020)
  - Total: 11,070
  - Density: 2,882.9/sq mi (1,113.09/km^{2})
- Time zone: UTC-8 (PST)
  - Summer (DST): UTC-7 (PDT)
- ZIP code: 94517
- Area code: 925
- FIPS code: 06-13882
- GNIS feature IDs: 277488, 2409474
- Website: claytonca.gov

Clayton (formerly Clayton's and Claytonville) is a city in Contra Costa County, California, United States. The population was 11,585 as of the 2020 census.

== History ==
In 1857, the town of Clayton was laid out and founded by Joel Henry Clayton (1812–1872) and his two younger brothers. Clayton was born in Bugsworth, now Buxworth, in the United Kingdom, and emigrated to the United States in 1837. After years in other states he settled down with his wife Margaret (1820–1908) at his town at the foot of Mount Diablo, where he and his family prospered. Clayton was named after Joel Henry Clayton, although only by the flip of a coin. Joel Clayton and Charles Rhine cofounded the town, and each wanted to name it after himself. If Charles had won it would have become Rhinesville, but Joel Clayton won. Joel and his wife Margaret both died in Clayton, and were buried in Live Oak Cemetery in what is now Concord, CA.

Clayton prospered during the coal mining boom in eastern Contra Costa County. The post office opened in 1861. Following a previous incorporation attempt in 1960, Clayton incorporated in 1964 in order to stave off an annexation attempt in 1963 of the Cardinet Glen neighborhood by nearby Concord. After steady expansion during the 1970s to the east and west from its original boundaries, Clayton's land area more than doubled in 1987 to near its present-day boundaries with the annexations of the Dana Hills/Dana Ridge and Clayton Wood subdivisions, as well as the former Keller Ranch property that was developed during the 1990s with the Oakhurst Country Club.

=== Fires ===
Wildfires have been a common occurrence in recent years as California had a major drought from 2011-2017.

On September 8, 2013, fire broke out on Mount Diablo. Called the Morgan Fire, it started at the mercury mine area of Morgan Territory Road. The fire grew quickly and threatened homes and livestock. Evacuations were ordered for several areas, including Oak Hill Lane and Curry Canyon. It took over 1000 firefighters and eight aircraft to extinguish it. Full containment was announced on September 14, 2013, having burned 3,100 acres (4.8 sq mi; 1,300 ha).

On July 25, 2018, a vegetation fire broke out on Marsh Creek Rd near Morgan Territory. One home and 3 out buildings were destroyed. Evacuations were ordered for that evening. By July 28 the fire was 100% contained.

On August 16, 2020, Lightning strikes caused many fires across the state, one of which was another Morgan Fire which became part of the SCU Lightning Complex fires.

== Geography ==
According to the United States Census Bureau, the city has a total area of 3.8 square miles (9.8 km^{2}), all land.

Clayton is located at the foot of Mt. Diablo.

=== Climate ===
This region experiences hot and dry summers. According to the Köppen Climate Classification system, Clayton has a warm-summer Mediterranean climate, abbreviated "Csb" on climate maps.

On December 7, 2009, snow fell in Clayton and Concord for the first time since the 1970s.

Climate data for Clayton, California
Month	Jan	Feb	Mar	Apr	May	Jun	Jul	Aug	Sep	Oct	Nov	Dec	Year
Record high °F (°C)	75 (24)	80 (27)	85 (29)	95 (35)	98 (37)	104 (40)	106 (41)	108 (42)	115 (46)	101 (38)	83 (28)	77 (25)	112 (44)
Mean daily maximum °F (°C)	54.2 (12.3)	57.4 (14.1)	60.1 (15.6)	67.1 (19.5)	75.5 (24.2)	84.3 (29.1)	90.6 (32.6)	88.8 (31.6)	85.2 (29.6)	71.2 (21.8)	61.7 (16.5)	54.7 (12.6)	69.3 (20.7)
Mean daily minimum °F (°C)	35.0 (1.7)	37.2 (2.9)	39.8 (4.3)	44.6 (7.0)	48.9 (9.4)	55.6 (13.1)	58.0 (14.4)	56.4 (13.6)	50.2 (10.1)	46.9 (8.3)	39.8 (4.3)	36.3 (2.4)	46.3 (7.9)
Record low °F (°C)	15 (−9)	23 (−5)	26 (−3)	28 (−2)	31 (−1)	38 (3)	40 (4)	41 (5)	37 (3)	31 (−1)	24 (−4)	17 (−8)	15 (−9)
Average precipitation inches (mm)	4.02 (102)	3.87 (98)	2.91 (74)	1.24 (31)	0.69 (18)	0.14 (3.6)	0.02 (0.51)	0.05 (1.3)	0.17 (4.3)	1.02 (26)	2.39 (61)	3.61 (92)	20.12 (511)
Average precipitation days (≥ 0.01 in)	11	11	8	6	4	1	0	0	1	3	6	10	59
Source: Western Regional Climate Center (temperature & precipitation days, 1991-present), PRISM Climate Group (precipitation, 1981-2010)

== Education ==
It is in the Mount Diablo Unified School District.

The public schools which the K-12 students of Clayton attend include: Mt. Diablo Elementary School, Highlands Elementary School, Diablo View Middle School, Pine Hollow Middle School, and Clayton Valley Charter High School.

=== Public libraries ===
The Clayton branch of the Contra Costa County Library system is located in Clayton.

== Demographics ==
Historical population
Census	Pop.	Note	%±
1970	1,385		—
1980	4,325		212.3%
1990	7,317		69.2%
2000	10,762		47.1%
2010	10,897		1.3%
2020	11,070		1.6%
U.S. Decennial Census

=== 2020 census ===
As of the 2020 census, Clayton had a population of 11,070 and a population density of 2,882.8 inhabitants per square mile (1,113.1/km^{2}). The age distribution was 20.6% under the age of 18, 7.6% from 18 to 24, 17.4% from 25 to 44, 32.3% from 45 to 64, and 22.2% 65 years of age or older. The median age was 48.6 years. For every 100 females, there were 91.3 males, and for every 100 females age 18 and over, there were 89.2 males age 18 and over.

There were 4,089 households, of which 31.9% had children under the age of 18 living in them. Of all households, 68.6% were married-couple households, 3.2% were cohabiting-couple households, 7.9% were households with a male householder and no spouse or partner present, and 20.4% were households with a female householder and no spouse or partner present. About 17.6% of all households were made up of individuals, and 11.7% had someone living alone who was 65 years of age or older. The average household size was 2.70. There were 3,214 families (78.6% of all households).

There were 4,165 housing units, of which 1.8% were vacant. The homeowner vacancy rate was 0.6%, and the rental vacancy rate was 4.0%. 99.1% of residents lived in urban areas, while 0.9% lived in rural areas.

Racial composition as of the 2020 census
Race	Number	Percent
White	8,150	73.6%
Black or African American	173	1.6%
American Indian and Alaska Native	22	0.2%
Asian	1,036	9.4%
Native Hawaiian and Other Pacific Islander	18	0.2%
Some other race	287	2.6%
Two or more races	1,384	12.5%
Hispanic or Latino (of any race)	1,242	11.2%

=== 2023 ACS estimates ===
In 2023, the US Census Bureau estimated that 14.1% of the population were foreign-born. Of all people aged 5 or older, 85.8% spoke only English at home, 3.9% spoke Spanish, 5.4% spoke other Indo-European languages, 3.6% spoke Asian or Pacific Islander languages, and 1.2% spoke other languages. Of those aged 25 or older, 98.5% were high school graduates and 58.8% had a bachelor's degree.

The median household income was $172,226, and the per capita income was $73,228. About 1.4% of families and 2.2% of the population were below the poverty line.

=== Presidential election results ===
Clayton vote by party in presidential elections
Year	Democratic	Republican
2024	57.5% 4,079	39.3% 2,787
2020	60.2% 4,605	37.7% 2,882
2016	54.9% 3,500	38.9% 2,479
2012	50.5% 3,210	47.6% 3,020
2008	55.1% 3,625	43.5% 2,862
2004	46.7% 2,979	52.6% 3,357
2000	44.1% 2,653	52.6% 3,161
1996	44.2% 2,232	48.2% 2,430
1992	38.0% 1,781	40.7% 1,906
1988	34.3% 1,277	65.0% 2,421
1984	28.0% 657	71.5% 1,680
1980	24.9% 504	64.5% 1,306
1976	39.3% 455	59.1% 684
1972	33.9% 210	63.5% 393
1968	39.8% 212	56.2% 299
1964	56.6% 159	43.4% 122

== Politics ==
According to the California Secretary of State, as of February 10, 2025, Clayton has 8,621 registered voters. Of those, 3,653 (42.37%) are registered Democrats, 2,611 (30.2%) are registered Republicans, and 1,722 (19.9%) are No Party Preference.

== Media ==
The city of Clayton is served by the daily newspaper East Bay Times published by Bay Area News Group-East Bay (part of the Media News Group, Denver, Colorado), and by the local newspapers The Clayton Pioneer, and the Diablo Gazette, and is also served by Claycord.com, a conservative local news platform and blog covering community news and events.

== Notable people ==
- Sean Farnham, sports analyst
- Bob Jones, baseball player
- Kara Kohler, Olympic rower
- Charlie Krueger, football player
- Brandon Mull, fantasy author
- Paul Napolitano, basketball player
- Sam Williams, football player
