= Bill Baker (politician) =

American politician (born 1940)

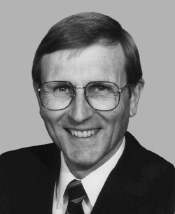

Member of the U.S. House of Representatives from California's 10th district
- In office January 3, 1993 – January 3, 1997
- Preceded by: Don Edwards
- Succeeded by: Ellen Tauscher

Member of the California State Assembly from the 15th district
- In office December 6, 1982 – November 30, 1992
- Preceded by: Gilbert Marguth
- Succeeded by: Richard Rainey

Member of the California State Assembly from the 10th district
- In office December 1, 1980 – November 30, 1982
- Preceded by: Daniel Boatwright
- Succeeded by: Phillip Isenberg

Personal details
- Born: William Pond Baker; June 14, 1940 (age 86) Oakland, California, U.S.
- Party: Republican
- Spouse: Joanne Atack
- Children: 4
- Education: San Jose State University (BS)

Military service
- Allegiance: United States
- Branch/service: United States Coast Guard
- Years of service: 1957–1965

William Pond Baker (born June 14, 1940) is an American businessman and politician who served two terms as a United States congressman from California from 1993 to 1997.

== Biography ==
He attended San Jose State University, from which he earned a business degree. Baker served as a member of the United States Coast Guard reserve from 1957 to 1965.

After graduating from college, Baker worked as a budget analyst for a large financial corporation. He then took a similar job with the California Department of Finance, which he held for four years.

=== State assembly ===
Baker worked as the vice president of a Taxpayers Association until he successfully ran for a seat in the California State Assembly as a Republican in 1980. He served six terms in a district that included portions of Contra Costa and Alameda Counties.

=== Congress ===
In 1992, Baker ran for Congress and served two terms in the House before losing reelection in 1996 to Ellen Tauscher. Baker was a political conservative.

=== After Congress ===
After leaving Congress, Baker returned to the field of finance, and was a partner in the Baker, Brose & Mitsutome investment management firm.

== Electoral history ==
California's 10th congressional district: Results 1992–1996
Year	Democrat	Votes	Pct	Republican	Votes	Pct		3rd Party	Party	Votes	Pct	3rd Party	Party	Votes	Pct	
1992	Wendell H. Williams	134,635	48%	Bill Baker	145,702	52%	*									
1994	Ellen Schwartz	90,523	39%	Bill Baker	138,916	59%		Craig W. Cooper	Peace and Freedom	4,802	2%					
1996	Ellen O. Tauscher	137,726	49%	Bill Baker	133,633	47%		John Place	Reform	6,354	2%	Valerie Janlois	Natural Law	3,047	1%	*

*Write-in and minor candidate notes: In 1992, write-ins received 92 votes. In 1996, Libertarian Gregory K. Lyon received 2,423 votes.

U.S. House of Representatives
Preceded by Don Edwards	Member of the U.S. House of Representatives from California's 10th congressional district 1993–1997	Succeeded by Ellen Tauscher
U.S. order of precedence (ceremonial)
Preceded by Ed Zschau as Former U.S. Representative	Order of precedence of the United States as Former U.S. Representative	Succeeded by James E. Rogan as Former U.S. Representative
