= John A. Nejedly =

American politician (1914–2006)

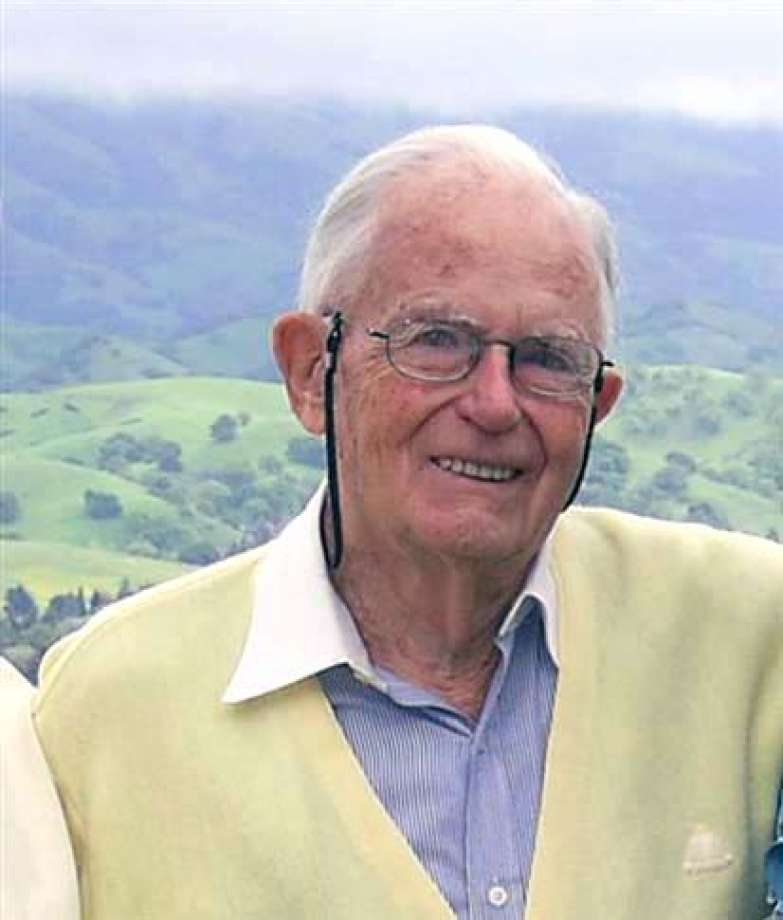
- Nejedly with Mount Diablo in the background

Member of the California Senate from the 7th district
- In office April 7, 1969 – November 30, 1980
- Preceded by: George Miller Jr.
- Succeeded by: Daniel E. Boatwright

District Attorney of Contra Costa County
- In office 1958–1969

Personal details
- Born: October 22, 1914 Oakland, California, U.S.
- Died: September 19, 2006 (aged 91) Walnut Creek, California , U.S.
- Resting place: Johnsville Cemetery; Johnsville, California , U.S.
- Party: Republican
- Children: Mary N. Piepho; James A. Nejedly; John T. Nejedly
- Education: University of California, Berkeley (BS 1935, LLB, 1941, UC Berkeley School of Law)
- Occupation: Attorney, politician

Military service
- Allegiance: United States
- Branch/service: U.S. Army Air Forces
- Years of service: 1942–1946
- Unit: Technical Air Intelligence (Japanese language)
- Battles/wars: World War II, Pacific theater

John Albert Nejedly (October 22, 1914 – September 19, 2006) was a district attorney and Republican state senator in California who represented Contra Costa County from 1958 to 1980.

== Early life ==
Born in Oakland, California, Nejedly was raised there while attending public schools. He was a member of the Boy Scouts and went on to earn the rank of Eagle Scout.

After high school, Nejedly attended the University of California, Berkeley, where he received his Bachelor of Science in business administration in 1935. In 1938, he purchased a parcel of hillside land in the then-unincorporated area of Walnut Creek, which became his lifelong home. He continued with his education and received his Bachelor of Laws from the UC Berkeley School of Law in 1941.

From 1942 to 1946, Nejedly served with the U.S. Army Air Forces in World War II as a Japanese language officer. He was also the lone survivor of a plane crash during the war.

== Professional career ==
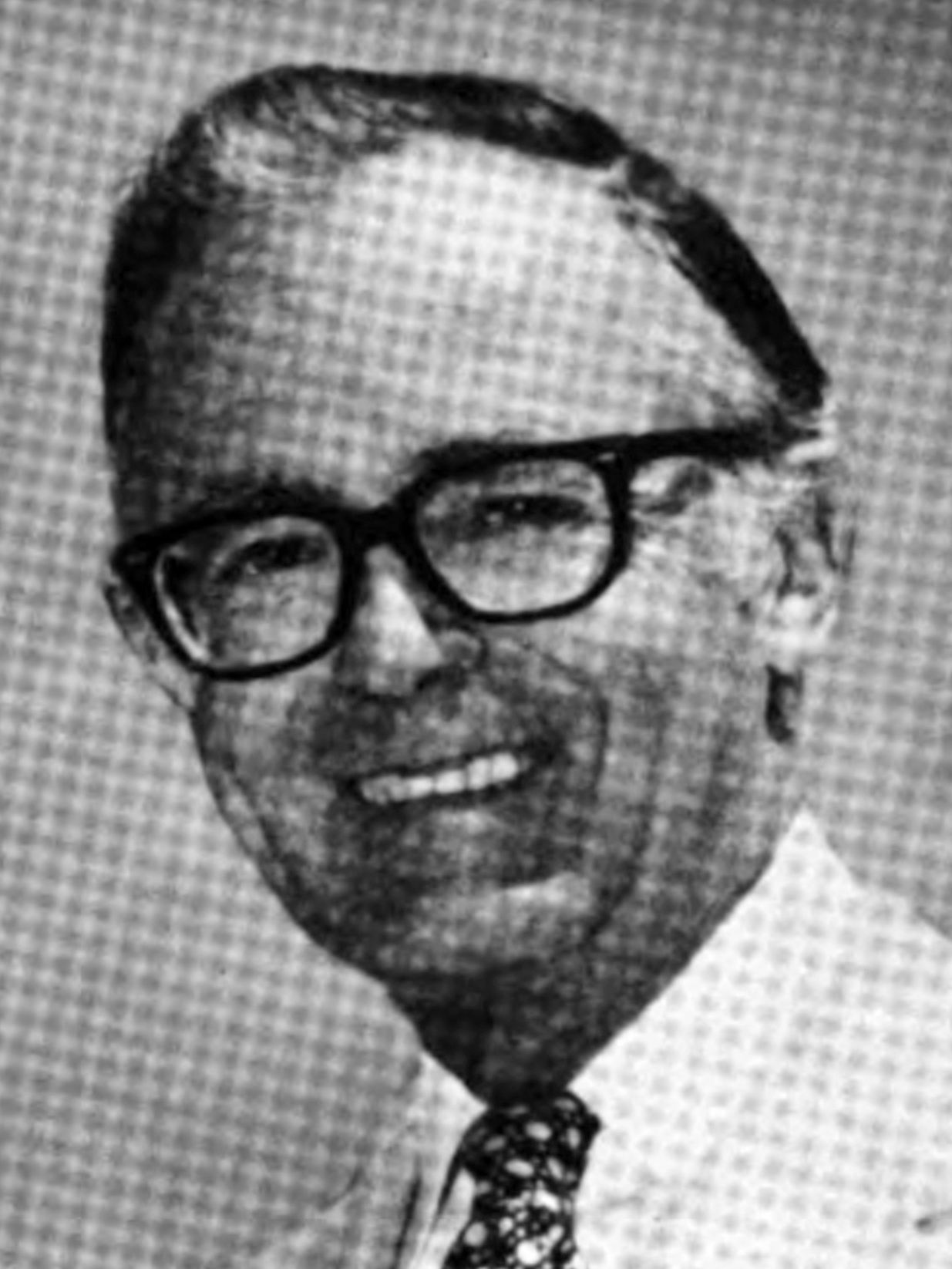
Nejedly as a State Senator in 1975.

Nejedly became a Deputy District Attorney for Contra Costa County in 1946, and in 1948 took on the additional role as the City Attorney for the City of Walnut Creek, both roles that he held until 1958. While serving as City Attorney, he played a key role in the creation of the Little Master Plan, a land use and public improvement plan that called for the culverting of portions of Walnut, Las Trampas, and San Ramon Creeks within downtown Walnut Creek, for the purpose of flood control and commercial development. This plan, which was adopted by the City in 1956, led to the expansion of Broadway Plaza and the creation of the portion of North Broadway between Lincoln Avenue and Mount Diablo Boulevard. A plaque commemorating the Little Master Plan can be found at the corner of Duncan Street and North Broadway, in downtown Walnut Creek.

While working for the city of Walnut Creek, Nejedly engineered the annexation of the city into the East Bay Municipal Utility District, thereby providing a more stable source of drinking water (the city has since grown into areas that are served by the Contra Costa Water District). Nejedly was also successful in working to annex the city into the Central Contra Costa Sanitary District, which allowed the city to close its old sewer farm and to reuse the land for what is now the eastern portion of Civic Park (at the end of Carmel Drive, near the intersection of North Broadway and Civic Drive).

== Political career ==
In 1958, Nejedly was elected to the post of district attorney for Contra Costa County, his first elected office and a position he held for the next decade.

In the late 1950s and early 1960s Nejedly helped lead attempts by the Contra Costa Park Council to create a park system in Contra Costa County. Ultimately he was a leader with local attorney Hulet Hornbeck in the successful 1964 campaign to expand the East Bay Regional Park District to include much of the County.

In 1969, Nejedly was elected to the office of State Senator for California State Senate District 7, a seat that was made vacant by the passing of George Miller Jr. Serving Contra Costa County, he went on to hold this position for three consecutive terms, until his retirement in 1980. It was also during this time that Nejedly donated 80 acres (32 ha) of wilderness land at Hawley Lake in the Sierra Nevadas for use as a summer camp by Boy Scouts of the Mt. Diablo Council and by the Contra Costa Youth Council, a new organization he created for disabled and disadvantaged children. In addition, he funded a scholarship to help minority adults.

While in the State Senate, Nejedly gained a reputation as an environmentalist, and served as Chairman of the Senate Committee on Natural Resources and Wildlife. He took an active role in legislation related to water policy and environmental preservation, authoring or co-authoring environmental legislation that included the following:

- Solid Waste Management and Resource Recovery Act of 1972 (creating the Solid Waste Management Board, requiring statewide solid waste plans, and encouraging increased recycling).
- Forest Protection Act of 1973 (providing for forest resource management that "balances timber production with watershed protection, fisheries and wildlife, and recreational opportunities").
- Suisun Marsh Preservation Act of 1974 (providing for preservation of the Suisun Marsh).
- Wilderness Act of 1974 (allowing the state legislature to designate state lands as wilderness areas and prohibit mining, logging, or road construction).
- Surface Mining and Reclamation Act of 1975 (requiring reclamation plans to minimize environmental impacts and to give "consideration to values relating to recreation, watershed, wildlife, range and forage, and aesthetic enjoyment").
- Urban and Coastal Park Bond Act of 1976 ($280 million bond used to purchase park lands).
- Hazardous Substances Information and Training Act of 1980 (establishing an employee's "right to know" about chemical hazards in the workplace).
- California Parklands Act of 1980 ($285 million bond used to purchase, rehabilitate, and develop park lands).

Nejedly was also active in the area of criminal justice, and authored the Uniform Determinate Sentencing Act of 1976, which mandated fixed sentences for most crimes.

In 1972, Nejedly authored Senate Bill 25, to authorize the design and construction of the new Antioch Bridge in Antioch, which replaced a vertical lift bridge that was constructed in 1926. After its completion, the new bridge was named the "Senator John A. Nejedly Bridge" in his honor. In 1979, nearby land was acquired for the Antioch/Oakley Regional Shoreline with the support of Nejedly, and it was Nejedly's suggestion that some of the old bridge's pillars be used for what is now a fishing pier.

== Post-retirement life ==
After his retirement from the state senate in 1980, Nejedly was active in many community organizations related to the environment, water policy, criminal justice, healthcare, and children's welfare.

Throughout the early 1980s, Nejedly fought to prevent the construction of the Peripheral Canal, a plan that would have diverted water from Sacramento River around the Sacramento River Delta and onwards to southern California.

In 1988 Nejedly was co-chairman of the East Bay Regional Park District's successful campaign in favor of Measure AA, a $225 million bond which has resulted in over 30,000 acres (120 km^{2}) being added to the District's land holdings, now totaling almost 100,000 acres (160 sq mi; 400 km^{2}).

In the mid-1980s, Nejedly was actively involved in supporting the construction of the Contra Costa Water District's Los Vaqueros Reservoir to provide a more reliable source of clean drinking water to portions of central and eastern Contra Costa County. The bond for this project was passed in 1988, and the dam was completed in 1994. In 2004 Nejedly was chairman of the campaign opposing CCWD's Measure N, an advisory measure asking voters for authorization of studies considering tearing down the recently completed Los Vaqueros dam and replacing it with a larger dam and reservoir.

A month before his 92nd birthday in 2006, Nejedly died in Walnut Creek, a few days after suffering a massive stroke.

== Honors ==
In 1978, the replacement Antioch Bridge was named the "Senator John A. Nejedly Bridge" in his honor.

In 1983, he was awarded the John Muir Conservation Award by the John Muir Memorial Association, for his efforts in protecting Mount Diablo.

In the early 1990s the East Bay Regional Park District dedicated the Nejedly Staging Area at the new Carquinez Strait Regional Shoreline in the retired State Senator's honor. In October 2005 a trail leading from the staging area was named in honor of Hulet Hornbeck, Nejedly's good friend and collaborator in helping to extend the East Bay Regional Park District into Contra Costa County.
