= California's 7th senatorial district =

American legislative district

California's 7th State Senate district
Current senator
Jesse Arreguín; D–Berkeley
- Population (2010) • Voting age • Citizen voting age: 924,708; 687,634; 569,011
- Demographics: 54.65% White; 6.14% Black; 20.95% Latino; 15.92% Asian; 0.69% Native American; 0.52% Hawaiian/Pacific Islander; 0.32% other; 0.80% remainder of multiracial
- Registered voters: 598,594
- Registration: 47.50% Democratic; 22.96% Republican; 24.41% No party preference

California's 7th senatorial district is one of 40 California State Senate districts. It is currently represented by Democrat Jesse Arreguín of Berkeley.

== District profile ==
=== 2020s ===
After 2020 redistricting, the 7th district moved to cover the westernmost portions of Alameda and Contra Costa counties. The district includes the cities of Oakland, Alameda, Berkeley, Richmond, and Hercules.

=== 2010s ===
The district encompasses most of Contra Costa County, including Concord, Antioch, Pittsburg, Bay Point, Martinez, Pleasant Hill, Walnut Creek, Lafayette, Danville, San Ramon, and Orinda; along with Castro Valley, San Lorenzo, and San Leandro in Alameda County.

== Election results from statewide races ==
Year	Office	Results
2020	President	Biden 67.9 – 30.0%
2018	Governor	Newsom 63.1 – 36.9%
2018	Senator	Feinstein 56.8 – 43.2%
2016	President	Clinton 64.3 – 29.6%
2016	Senator	Harris 68.7 – 31.3%
2014	Governor	Brown 63.1 – 36.9%
2012	President	Obama 60.5 – 37.5%
2012	Senator	Feinstein 64.3 – 35.7%
2010	Governor	Brown 59.2 – 37.0%
2010	Senator	Boxer 58.1 – 37.4%
2008	President	Obama 66.7 – 31.6%
2006	Governor	Schwarzenegger 54.2 – 40.9%
2006	Senator	Feinstein 67.6 – 28.0%
2004	President	Kerry 60.9 – 38.1%
2004	Senator	Boxer 62.0 – 34.8%
2003	Recall	No 54.9 – 45.1%
2003	Recall	Schwarzenegger 40.8 – 36.8%
2002	Governor	Davis 51.7 – 37.2%
2000	President	Gore 54.3 – 41.7%
2000	Senator	Feinstein 58.2 – 37.2%
1998	Governor	Davis 58.7 – 38.5%
1998	Senator	Boxer 53.1 – 43.8%
1996	President	Clinton 51.3 – 39.4%
1994	Governor	Wilson 58.2 – 40.1%
1994	Senator	Feinstein 54.1 – 39.8%
1992	President	Clinton 45.4 – 32.9%
1992	Senator	Boxer 50.8 – 39.5%
1992	Senator	Feinstein 59.3 – 35.1%

== List of senators representing the district ==
Due to redistricting, the 7th district has been moved around different parts of the state. The current iteration resulted from the 2021 redistricting by the California Citizens Redistricting Commission.

Senators	Party	Years served	Counties represented	Notes
C. H. Maddox	Democratic	January 8, 1883 – January 5, 1885	Santa Clara	
A. W. Saxe	Republican	January 5, 1885 – January 3, 1887	Santa Clara	Both Saxe and Lowe served together for 2 years.
James R. Lowe	Republican	January 5, 1885 – January 3, 1887	Santa Clara	Both Saxe and Lowe served together for 2 years.
A. P. Hall	Republican	January 3, 1887 – January 2, 1889	El Dorado, Placer	
Thomas Fraser	Republican	January 2, 1889 – January 2, 1893	El Dorado, Placer	
Henry C. Gesford	Democratic	January 2, 1893 – January 4, 1897	Lake, Napa	
Calhoun Lee LaRue	Democratic	January 4, 1897 – January 1, 1901	Lake, Napa	
Robert Corlett	Republican	January 1, 1901 – January 2, 1905	Lake, Napa	
James A. McKee	Republican	January 2, 1905 – January 4, 1909	Sacramento	
Charles B. Bills	Republican	January 4, 1909 – January 6, 1913	Sacramento	
Philip Charles Cohn	Democratic	January 6, 1913 – January 8, 1917	Sacramento	
J. M. Inman	Republican	January 8, 1917 – January 2, 1933	Sacramento	
Jerrold L. Seawell	Republican	January 2, 1933 – November 6, 1946	Nevada, Placer, Sierra	Resigned from the Senate.
Vacant		November 6, 1946 – November 4, 1947	Nevada, Placer, Sierra	
Allen G. Thurman	Republican	November 4, 1947 – January 3, 1949	Nevada, Placer, Sierra	Sworn in after winning special election.
Harold T. Johnson	Democratic	January 3, 1949 – January 3, 1959	Nevada, Placer, Sierra	Resigned, after winning congressional seat for the 2nd district.
Vacant		January 3, 1959 – April 20, 1959	Nevada, Placer, Sierra	
Ronald G. Cameron	Democratic	April 20, 1959 – September 3, 1963	Nevada, Placer, Sierra	Sworn in after winning special election. Resigned to become a Judge for the Placer County Superior Court.
Vacant		September 3, 1963 – December 6, 1963	Nevada, Placer, Sierra	
Paul J. Lunardi	Democratic	December 6, 1963 – January 2, 1967	Placer	Sworn in after winning special election.
George Miller Jr.	Democratic	January 2, 1967 – January 1, 1969	Contra Costa	Died in office. Died from a heart attack.
Vacant		January 1, 1969 – April 7, 1969	Contra Costa	
John A. Nejedly	Republican	April 7, 1969 – November 30, 1980	Contra Costa	Sworn in after winning special election.
Daniel Boatwright	Democratic	December 1, 1980 – November 30, 1996	Contra Costa	
Daniel Boatwright	Democratic	December 1, 1980 – November 30, 1996	Alameda, Contra Costa	
Richard Rainey	Republican	December 2, 1996 – November 30, 2000	Alameda, Contra Costa	
Tom Torlakson	Democratic	December 4, 2000 – November 30, 2008	Alameda, Contra Costa	
Tom Torlakson	Democratic	December 4, 2000 – November 30, 2008	Contra Costa	
Mark DeSaulnier	Democratic	December 1, 2008 – January 2, 2015	Contra Costa	Resigned to be sworn into the 11th Congressional district.
Mark DeSaulnier	Democratic	December 1, 2008 – January 2, 2015	Alameda, Contra Costa	Resigned to be sworn into the 11th Congressional district.
Vacant		January 2, 2015 – May 28, 2015	Alameda, Contra Costa	
Steve Glazer	Democratic	May 28, 2015 – November 30, 2024	Alameda, Contra Costa	Sworn in after winning special election.
Jesse Arreguín	Democratic	December 2, 2024 – present	Alameda, Contra Costa	

== Election results (1990-present) ==
=== 2024 ===
2024 California State Senate 7th district election
Primary election
Party	Candidate	Votes	%
Democratic	Jesse Arreguín	61,892	32.1
Democratic	Jovanka Beckles	34,085	17.7
Democratic	Dan Kalb	28,881	15.0
Democratic	Kathryn Lybarger	28,070	14.6
Democratic	Sandré Swanson	22,907	11.9
Republican	Jeanne Solnordal	16,855	8.7
Total votes		192,690	100.0
General election
Democratic	Jesse Arreguín	199,423	57.2
Democratic	Jovanka Beckles	149,415	42.8
Total votes		348,838	100.0
Democratic hold			

=== 2020 ===
2020 California State Senate 7th district election
Primary election
Party	Candidate	Votes	%
Democratic	Steve Glazer (incumbent)	135,123	48.3
Republican	Julie Mobley	76,180	27.2
Democratic	Marisol Rubio	68,362	24.4
Total votes		279,665	100.0
General election
Democratic	Steve Glazer (incumbent)	339,925	66.0
Republican	Julie Mobley	174,729	34.0
Total votes		514,654	100.0
Democratic hold			

=== 2016 ===
2016 California State Senate 7th district election
Primary election
Party	Candidate	Votes	%
Democratic	Steve Glazer (incumbent)	122,186	54.3
Republican	Joseph Alexander Rubay	61,169	27.2
Democratic	Guy Moore	41,497	18.5
Total votes		224,852	100.0
General election
Democratic	Steve Glazer (incumbent)	270,485	66.7
Republican	Joseph Rubay	135,122	33.3
Total votes		405,607	100.0
Democratic hold			

=== 2015 (special) ===
2015 California State Senate 7th district special election Vacancy resulting from the resignation of Mark DeSaulnier
Primary election
Party	Candidate	Votes	%
Democratic	Steve Glazer	38,411	33.7
Democratic	Susan Bonilla	28,389	24.9
Democratic	Joan Buchanan	25,534	22.4
Republican	Michaela M. Hertle (withdrawn)	18,281	16.1
Democratic	Terry Kremin	3,242	2.8
Total votes		113,857	100.0
General election
Democratic	Steve Glazer	68,996	54.5
Democratic	Susan Bonilla	57,491	45.5
Total votes		126,487	100.0
Democratic hold			

=== 2012 ===
2012 California State Senate 7th district election
Primary election
Party	Candidate	Votes	%
Democratic	Mark DeSaulnier (incumbent)	91,224	57.0
Republican	Mark P. Meuser	68,730	43.0
Total votes		159,954	100.0
General election
Democratic	Mark DeSaulnier (incumbent)	229,105	61.5
Republican	Mark P. Meuser	143,707	38.5
Total votes		372,812	100.0
Democratic hold			

=== 2008 ===
2008 California State Senate 7th district election
Party	Candidate	Votes	%
Democratic	Mark DeSaulnier	256,311	66.5
Republican	Christian Amsberry	128,878	33.5
Total votes		385,189	100.0
Democratic hold			

=== 2004 ===
2004 California State Senate 7th district election
Party	Candidate	Votes	%
Democratic	Tom Torlakson (incumbent)	282,714	100.0
Total votes		282,714	100.0
Democratic hold			

=== 2000 ===
2000 California State Senate 7th district election
Party	Candidate	Votes	%
Democratic	Tom Torlakson	197,683	54.5
Republican	Richard K. Rainey (incumbent)	156,107	43.0
Natural Law	Mark F. Billings	9,334	2.5
Total votes		363,124	100.0
Democratic gain from Republican			

=== 1996 ===
1996 California State Senate 7th district election
Party	Candidate	Votes	%
Republican	Richard K. Rainey	161,291	48.0
Democratic	Jeff Smith	160,632	47.8
Reform	William John Knudeon	7,077	2.1
Natural Law	Mark F. Billings	6,975	2.1
Total votes		335,975	100.0
Republican gain from Democratic			

=== 1992 ===
1992 California State Senate 7th district election
Party	Candidate	Votes	%
Democratic	Daniel E. Boatwright (incumbent)	195,777	58.0
Republican	Gilbert Marguth	141,709	42.0
Total votes		337,486	100.0
Democratic hold			

== See also ==
- California State Senate
- California State Senate districts
- Districts in California
