= Antioch/Oakley Regional Shoreline =

Coordinates: 38.01848°N 121.75107°W

- Interactive map of Antioch/Oakley Regional Shoreline
- Location: Contra Costa County, California
- Nearest city: Antioch, California; Oakley, California
- Created: 1979
- Operator: East Bay Regional Park District

Antioch/Oakley Regional Shoreline is a regional park that is part of the East Bay Regional Parks system. It is located on the south shore of the San Joaquin River in Contra Costa County, California, between the cities of Antioch and Oakley. It is owned by the State of California and operated on a no-cost lease by the East Bay Regional Parks District. The park was begun in 1979, when the adjacent John Nejedly Bridge (a.k.a. Antioch Bridge) was constructed across the river. (Note: The bridge was named for John A. Nejedly, who represented Contra Costa County in the California State Senate,) The park was originally named Antioch Regional Shoreline, and was given its present name when Oakley incorporated as a city in 1999.

== Facilities ==
The main attraction is fishing. The park features a fishing pier that was built atop the pilings of the original bridge. The pier extends 550 feet (170 m) out into the river. It is open for fishing 24 hours a day, 7 days per week. Typical species that can be caught, depending on the season, are striped bass, channel catfish, Sacramento pike, sturgeon, steelhead and salmon. The park also provides a fish cleaning station.

Picnic tables are available, and cannot be reserved in advance. The picnic area is open from 5 a.m. until 10 p.m. There is no fee to use them. No camping facilities are available and overnight camping is not permitted.

Kite flying is a popular activity at this park.

== Access ==
The park is at the north end of Bridgehead Road in Oakley. There is no fee for access. A California fishing license is required for anyone over the age of 16.
