= Gilbert Marguth =

American politician

California Deputy Superintendent of Public Instruction for Internal Management
- In office January 3, 1983 – unknown
- Governor: George Deukmejian

Member of the California State Assembly from the 15th district
- In office December 1, 1980 – November 30, 1982
- Preceded by: S. Floyd Mori
- Succeeded by: William P. Baker

Mayor of Livermore
- In office April 16, 1968 – April 21, 1970
- Preceded by: Robert Patterson
- Succeeded by: Roger Silva

Member of the Livermore City Council
- In office April 19, 1966 – April 21, 1970
- Preceded by: John Shirley
- Succeeded by: Robert Pritchard

Personal details
- Born: Gilbert R. Marguth, Jr. March 4, 1934 Portland, Oregon, U.S.
- Died: August 19, 2011 (aged 77) Livermore, California, U.S.
- Party: Republican
- Education: Oregon State University
- Occupation: Politician; businessman

Military service
- Allegiance: United States of America
- Branch/service: United States Air Force
- Years of service: 1952–1956
- Rank: Staff sergeant

Gilbert R. "Gib" Marguth Jr. (March 4, 1934 – August 19, 2011) was an American politician who served as a member of the California State Assembly from the 15th district from 1980 to 1982. A member of the Republican Party, Marguth served on the Livermore City Council from 1966 to 1970 and was the council-appointed mayor from 1968 to 1970.

Following his time in the Assembly, Marguth unsuccessfully ran for the California State Senate twice in 1982 and 1992. He was appointed to serve as the deputy superintendent of public instruction for internal management in 1982.

== Early life, education, and career ==
Marguth was born in Portland, Oregon, on March 4, 1934. After graduating from Parkrose High School in 1952, Marguth enlisted in the United States Air Force and served as a flight training instructor before being honorably discharged in 1956 as a staff sergeant.

Marguth attended Oregon State University and graduated with a Bachelor of Science in electrical engineering and mathematics in 1960.

=== Scientific career ===
Marguth had multiple professional tenures at Sandia National Laboratories, National Renewable Energy Laboratory, and Lawrence Livermore National Laboratory. After settling in Livermore, California, in the 1960s, Marguth co-founded Livermore Data Systems. He retired in 1994 and later served as an officer of the LLNL Retirees Association.

== Political career ==
=== Local politics ===
Marguth served on the Livermore Elementary School Board from 1964 to 1966.

Marguth was elected to the Livermore City Council in 1966. He was the council-appointed mayor of Livermore from 1968 to 1970. He chose not to run for a second term and left the city council in 1970.

During his time as mayor in 1969, Marguth was appointed to the Intergovernmental Board on Electronic Data Processing by Ronald Reagan.

Marguth served on the board of directors of the Zone 7 Water Agency from 1976 to 1980.

=== California State Assembly ===
Marguth was elected to the California State Assembly in 1980, defeating incumbent assemblymember S. Floyd Mori. He represented the 15th district, which was located entirely in Alameda County.

Instead of running for re-election in 1982, Marguth ran for the California State Senate in the 10th district. He was defeated by Democrat Bill Lockyer.

=== Later political activities ===
Following his term in the Assembly, Marguth was appointed by Bill Honig to serve as deputy superintendent of public instruction for internal management.

Marguth ran for the California State Senate again in 1992, this time running in the 7th district. He was defeated by incumbent Daniel Boatwright.

== Personal life ==
Marguth married his wife, Marjorie, in 1954. They had three children together.

Marguth battled leukemia and non-Hodgkin lymphoma for nine years. He died on August 19, 2011, at his home in Livermore.
