= S. Floyd Mori =

American politician

Member of the California State Assembly from the 15th district
- In office March 13, 1975 – November 30, 1980
- Preceded by: Carlos Bee, Jr.
- Succeeded by: Gilbert Marguth

Personal details
- Born: May 30, 1939 (age 87) Murray, Utah, U.S.
- Party: Democratic
- Spouse: Irene Mano (m. 1962)
- Children: 5
- Education: Brigham Young University (Master's degree)

Military service
- Branch/service: United States Army Reserves

Shiro Floyd Mori (born May 30, 1939) is an American politician and educator.

Mori was born in Murray, Utah; his parents emigrated to the United States from Japan. Mori graduated from Jordan High School in Sandy, Utah. He served in the United States Army and also served as an LDS missionary in Hawaii. Mori received a bachelor's degree with a dual major in Economics and Asian Studies and a master's degree in Economics and Political Science, both from Brigham Young University. He also went to the University of Southern California. He did fellowship programs at University of California, Los Angeles, and Stanford University. Mori taught economics at Chabot College. He was also involved with the Japanese American Citizens League (JACL) as a long time member, National President, and on the staff of the JACL as National Executive Director/CEO. He also served as President/CEO of the Asian Pacific American Institute for Congressional Studies (APAICS) in Washington, D.C. He has been an International Business Consultant and owned a golf business.

He is an author who has published a number of books, including The Japanese American Story As Told Through A Collection of Speeches and Articles.

From 1972 to 1975, Mori served on the Pleasanton, California City Council and also served as mayor of Pleasanton from 1974 to 1975. Mori then served in the California State Assembly from March 13, 1975, to November 30, 1980, and was a Democrat.

In 2012, Mori received the Order of the Rising Sun, Gold Rays with Rosette in recognition of his contributions to the "improvement of the status of Japanese Americans, strengthening of economic relations between Japan and the United States, and the promotion of Japanese culture in the United States".
