= Truman H. DeLap =

American politician (1885–1974)

Member of the California Senate from the 17th district
- In office January 4, 1937 - January 3, 1949
- Preceded by: William Richard Sharkey
- Succeeded by: George Miller Jr.

Member of the California State Assembly from the 10th district
- In office January 7, 1935 - January 4, 1937
- Preceded by: Clifford C. Anglim
- Succeeded by: Harold F. Sawallisch

Personal details
- Born: October 30, 1885 Klamath Falls, Oregon, U.S.
- Died: December 30, 1974 (aged 89) Contra Costa, California, U.S.
- Party: Republican
- Spouse: Catherine Yontz
- Children: 2

Military service
- Branch/service: United States Army
- Battles/wars: World War I

Truman H. DeLap (October 30, 1885 - December 30, 1974) served in the California State Assembly for the 17th district from 1935 to 1937 and California State Senate from 1937 to 1949. During World War I he served in the United States Army.
