= Joan Buchanan =

American politician (born 1952)

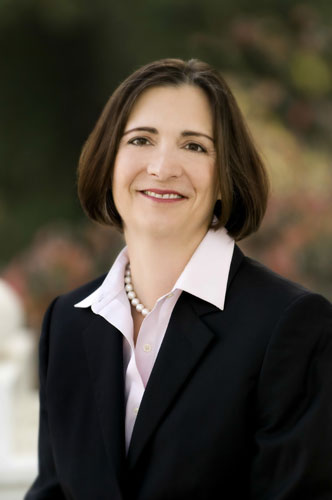

Member of the California State Assembly from the 16th district 15th district (2008–2012)
- In office December 1, 2008 – November 30, 2014
- Preceded by: Guy Houston
- Succeeded by: Catharine Baker

Personal details
- Born: October 4, 1952 (age 73) San Francisco, California, U.S.
- Party: Democratic
- Children: Jennifer; Christopher; Steven; David; Lindsey
- Education: University of California, Santa Barbara
- Occupation: Politician

Joan T. Buchanan (born October 4, 1952) is an American politician and former Democratic Party public official and former school board member from Alamo, California. She was a member of the California State Assembly from 2008 to 2014.

== Pre-political career ==
Buchanan attended the University of California, Santa Barbara and graduated with a bachelor of arts degree in economics in 1973.

Before the age of 30, she retired from the private sector, after obtaining the position of Director of Commercial Operations at Delta Dental.

While raising her five children locally, Buchanan served for 20 years on the San Ramon Valley School Board, including 4 terms as president. Buchanan's budgeting and organizational development led to SRVUSD being ranked among the top 5% of all school districts in California. Over 94% of the district's graduating seniors attend college.

Buchanan also served as Vice-President of the San Ramon Valley School Age Child Care Alliance and helped bring childcare services to San Ramon elementary schools. In addition, she successfully led the 1994 "No on Vouchers" campaign to preserve funds for public schools.

== Political career ==
=== 2008 California State Assembly campaign ===
Buchanan successfully ran for State Assembly in 2008. She ran in California's 15th district against Republican San Ramon Mayor H. Abram Wilson. Assembly District 15 includes areas of Contra Costa, Alameda, Sacramento, and San Joaquin Counties. Buchanan won the election by 52% to 48%.

=== 2009 Congressional campaign ===
On March 18, 2009, Buchanan's hometown Congresswoman Rep. Ellen Tauscher (D CA-10) was nominated by President Barack Obama to serve as Undersecretary of State for Arms Control and International Security. A special election to fill her seat took place in 2009. Buchanan ran in the Democratic Primary to replace Rep. Tauscher. She lost to Democratic former Lieutenant Governor John Garamendi.

=== 2015 state senate campaign ===
In December 2014, Buchanan announced that she would run for Mark DeSaulnier's seat in the State Senate. DeSaulnier resigned to represent California's 11th congressional district in the US House of Representatives. She lost in the primary election on March 17 to Democrats Susan Bonilla and Steve Glazer. Following her loss, she endorsed Bonilla in the runoff against Glazer.
