= George Miller Jr. =

American politician (1914–1969)

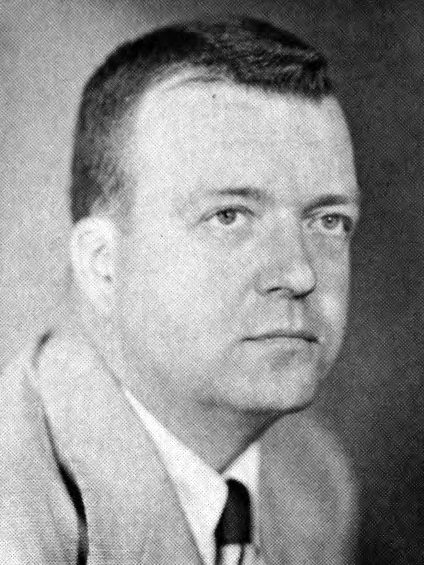
- Miller in 1961

Member of the California Senate from the 7th district
- In office January 2, 1967 – January 1, 1969
- Preceded by: Paul J. Lunardi
- Succeeded by: John A. Nejedly

Member of the California Senate from the 17th district
- In office January 3, 1949 – January 2, 1967
- Preceded by: Truman H. DeLap
- Succeeded by: Donald L. Grunsky

Member of the California State Assembly from the 10th district
- In office January 6, 1947 – January 3, 1949
- Preceded by: Harold F. Sawallisch
- Succeeded by: Robert Condon

Personal details
- Born: January 7, 1914 Oakland, California
- Died: January 1, 1969 (aged 54) Martinez, California
- Party: Democratic
- Spouse: Dorothy Rumsey
- Children: 4, including George
- Education: St. Mary's College

George Miller Jr. (January 7, 1914 – January 1, 1969) was an American Democratic politician who served as a California State Assemblyman from 1947 to 1949 and a California State Senator from 1949 to 1969. He was a leader of the liberal wing of the California Democratic Party in the early 1950s when the Republican Party dominated state government. Miller was the father of U.S. Representative George Miller III.

== History ==
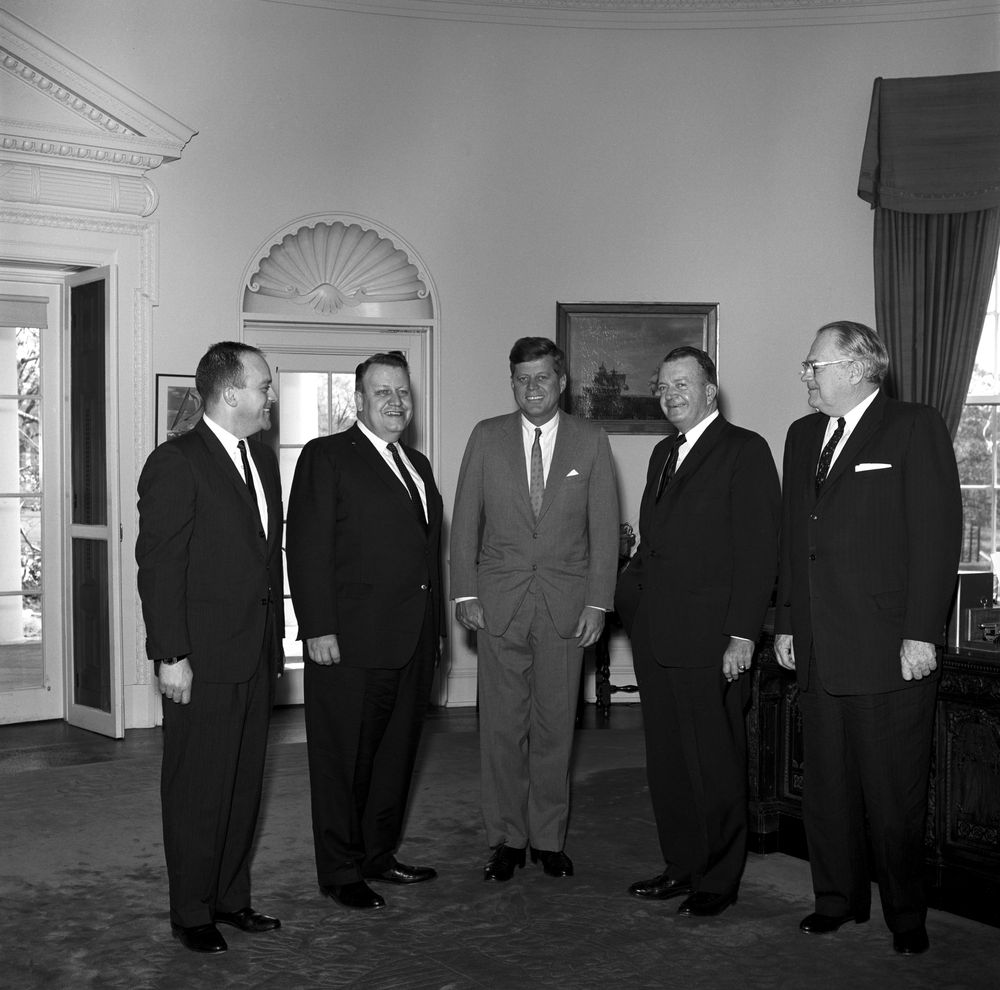
President John F. Kennedy meets with California state legislators. Left to right: Chairman of the California Assembly Committee on Ways and Means, Robert W. Crown; California State Assembly Speaker, Jesse Unruh; President Kennedy; Chairman of the California Senate Finance Committee, George Miller, Jr.; and President Pro Tempore of the California State Senate, Hugh M. Burns. Oval Office, White House, Washington, D.C.

Miller was a native Californian, educated at St. Mary's College in Contra Costa County, where he began his political career. Elected to the state Assembly in 1946, he served one term there before being elected to the state Senate in 1948. Miller ran unsuccessfully for lieutenant governor in 1950, losing his bid for the nomination as running mate to gubernatorial nominee James Roosevelt. Together with U.S. Senate nominee Helen Gahagan Douglas, Roosevelt was deserted by the old-line state Democratic organization of San Francisco boss William M. Malone, with the acquiescence of President Harry S. Truman and other Washington, D.C. Democrats.

The only Democratic state candidate to win in 1950 was Attorney General Pat Brown. Miller had another disappointment that year when he sought the chairmanship of the California Democratic Party. Roosevelt and Douglas at first encouraged and supported him for the position, but then double-crossed Miller, who was opposed by Malone, and instead chose a little-known man from the San Joaquin Valley. Miller chose not to contest the back-room decision. "If that's the way they want it," he said in his gruff voice, "to hell with it."

In 1952, Miller was one of the few California Democratic office-holders among the early supporters of the presidential campaign of Senator Estes Kefauver of Tennessee. The regular party organization had originally supported the re-election of President Truman, but when Truman withdrew from the race, the party professionals, in desperation, coalesced around Pat Brown as a "favorite son." In the June primary, Kefauver easily defeated the Brown slate and the winning California delegation to the Democratic National Convention, largely composed of Kefauver supporters, chose Miller as delegation chairman. Kefauver later lost the nomination to Illinois Governor Adlai Stevenson, a late entry into the race, but that fall, both the Truman professionals and the Kefauver and Stevenson amateurs at last united in selecting Miller as the new chairman of the state Democratic Party. He held this post for two years.

He used his official influence as party chairman to become a founding father, in 1953, of the California Democratic Council, the unofficial grassroots "club movement" organization that helped bring the Democrats to power in Sacramento in 1958 with Pat Brown's election as governor.

Miller laid the groundwork for this success. "He is an earthy, engaging man", wrote political science professor Francis Carney in 1958, "whose conversation is characterized by warmth and vigor...his steadfast championing of new party organizations..secured him a reputation for vision and courage ... he has that remarkable, rare and valuable - though hardly palpable - political asset called a following. He is, in other words 'available' for higher office and the knowledge of this within the party assures him a measure of influence."

Miller did not seek higher office, neither in the year of Brown's victory, nor in the subsequent ten years of his life during which he remained in the state Senate, becoming chairman of the Finance Committee and sometimes wary legislative collaborator of Speaker of the Assembly Jesse Unruh. He worked even more closely with Governor Brown, with whom Unruh was often feuding, to ensure the success of the governor's legislative agenda. Brown's campaign manager and political strategist, Don Bradley, was an old and close friend of Miller, whom he called "the best politician I ever ran into", and they worked closely together to "engineer" the election of more liberal Democrats to the state Senate; their unsung efforts "changed the ideological complexion" of the conservative upper house, and thus "made possible the enactment of much of the Democratic legislation" of the Brown years.

== Death and legacy ==
Miller died in office unexpectedly, six days before his 55th birthday, two years after Governor Brown was defeated for re-election by Ronald Reagan.

== Legacy ==
The southbound span of the Benicia–Martinez Bridge was named in his honor.
