= Lynne Leach =

American politician (born 1940)

Member of the California State Assembly from the 15th district
- In office December 2, 1996 – November 30, 2002
- Preceded by: Richard Rainey
- Succeeded by: Guy Houston

Personal details
- Born: January 8, 1940 (age 86) Chicago, Illinois
- Party: Republican
- Spouse: Bob
- Children: 2
- Education: Roosevelt University

Lynne C. Leach (born January 8, 1940, in Chicago, Illinois) is a former California State Assemblywoman who served from 1996 until 2002. A Republican, she represented the more conservative Bay Area suburbs in the East Bay. Prior to serving in the Assembly, Leach was a businesswoman with her own business, Applied Business Communications, Inc.

== Early life ==
Leach was raised in a blue-collar family. Her father was a sheet metal worker and union member. Her mother was a full-time homemaker. She worked her way through college and in 1963 graduated from Roosevelt University with a degree in psychology.

In 1964, she and her husband Bob moved to California. In 1967 they settled in Walnut Creek, where they raised their now grown children, Carol and Brian.

== Before the Assembly ==
Leach has been a businesswoman and involved in sales all of her adult life. In 1978 she started her own business, Applied Business Communications, Inc. The firm specialized in sales, customer service and communications training.

== Assembly terms ==
In 1996, Leach was elected to the State Assembly when Richard Rainey left his seat to make a successful run for the State Senate. She was reelected in 1998 and 2000 by commanding margins.

While serving in the Assembly in Sacramento, Leach's top priorities were to make California more business-friendly; return the state's schools to their top status, address the transportation challenges of the Bay Area and provide some relief on taxes.

Leach served as Chair of the Assembly Republican Caucus in her first term and as Vice Chair of the Assembly Education Committee in her second and third terms. Other Committee assignments were: Transportation, Insurance, Business and Professions, Jobs and Economic Development, Aging and Long Term Care, Joint Legislative Audit and the Master Plan for California Education (Kindergarten through Higher Education).

== Republican Party activism ==
From 1988 to 1996, Lynne was actively involved in the Contra Costa County Republican Party, and she served as its chairwoman from 1991 to 1995. During her tenure, she introduced the successful Bootcamp (an annual candidate training program) and the R.E.V.O.L.T. (Republicans educating voters on lower taxes) Committee.

== Post-Assembly ==
Leach ran for state schools superintendent in 2002 and came in third place in the all-party primary with 26% of the vote. In 2003, she launched Lynne Leach Presents… offering informative, inspirational speeches and practical, common sense programs on sales – customer service, communications and leadership to the business and political communities.

Political offices
Preceded by Richard Rainey	California State Assemblyman, 15th District; 1996–2002	Succeeded by Guy S. Houston
Preceded by	State Assembly Republican Caucus Chairwoman; 1996–1998	Succeeded by
