= Guy Houston =

American politician (born 1961)

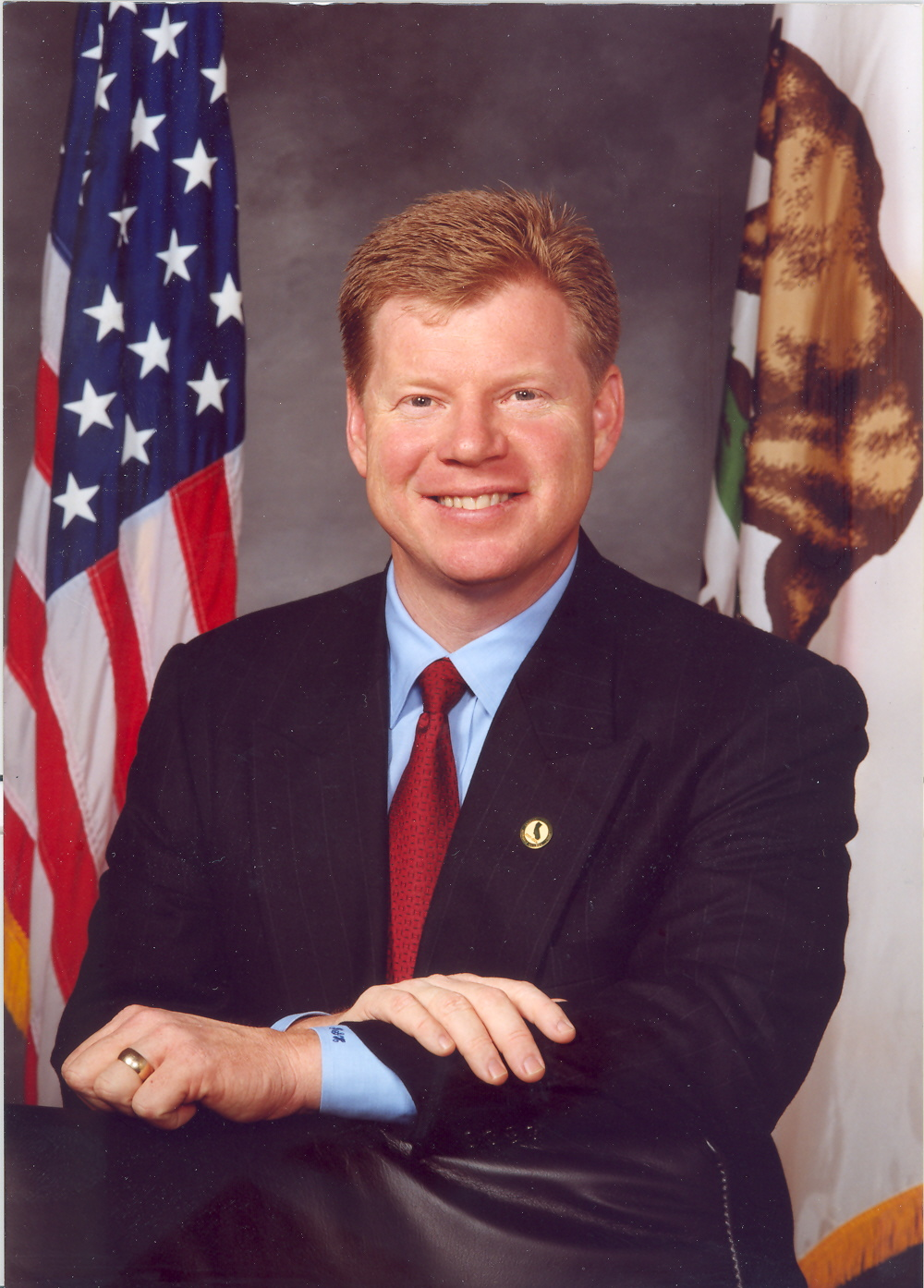

Member of the California State Assembly from the 15th district
- In office December 2, 2002 – November 30, 2008
- Preceded by: Lynne Leach
- Succeeded by: Joan Buchanan

4th Mayor of Dublin
- In office December 12, 1994 – October 18, 2001
- Preceded by: Pete Snyder
- Succeeded by: Janet Lockhart

Personal details
- Born: Guy Spencer Houston; October 20, 1961 (age 64) Walnut Creek, California
- Party: Republican
- Spouse: Ingeborg Sorensen
- Children: 3
- Education: Saint Mary's College of California (BS, MBA)
- Profession: Politician; real estate executive

Guy Spencer Houston (born October 20, 1961) is an American politician and real estate executive who served as a member of the California State Assembly from the 15th district from 2002 to 2008. A member of the Republican Party, Houston previously served as the 4th mayor of Dublin, California from 1994 to 2001.

== Early life and education ==
Houston was born in Walnut Creek, California, on October 20, 1961. He spent his childhood in Pleasanton, California, and attended San Ramon Valley High School, where he played varsity football for 3 years under his father's coaching and graduated in 1978. He grew up across the street from John Madden.

Houston attended Saint Mary's College of California on an athletic scholarship and originally pursued a career in sports to become a sportswriter. Houston graduated with a Bachelor of Science in business administration in 1982 and a Master of Business Administration in 1987. He also played football and baseball for the college.

== Career ==
While in college, Houston volunteered for the 1980 presidential campaign of Ronald Reagan, which sparked his interest in public service.

Houston earned his real estate license at age 18. He established his own real estate brokerage firm, Valley Capital Realty, in 1986. After leaving the California State Assembly, Houston established the California Gold Advocacy Group, another real estate brokerage firm.

=== Political career ===
==== Dublin City Council ====
Houston moved to Dublin, California, because he could afford a house there and wanted to be closer to his family. Houston first got involved in local politics in 1990 when he proposed a successful initiative to make the city's mayor an elected position. He first elected to the Dublin City Council in 1992 and served as mayor of Dublin from 1994 until his resignation in 2001. Houston resigned as mayor to focus on his Assembly campaign.

==== California State Assembly ====
Houston was first elected to the California State Assembly in 2002, defeating Contra Costa County supervisor Donna Gerber with 53.6% of the vote. He was re-elected in 2004 and 2006. He was term-limited in 2008 and was succeeded by Democrat Joan Buchanan.

Houston represented the 15th district, which, during his time in the Assembly, encompassed parts of Contra Costa, Alameda, San Joaquin, and Sacramento Counties. During his time in the Assembly, Houston served on the Transportation, Local Government, and Banking and Finance Committees.

Houston was considered a potential challenger to Jerry McNerney in California's 11th congressional district in 2008 but declined to run because he was not considered conservative enough to defeat McNerney. He instead ran for the Contra Costa County Board of Supervisors against Mary Piepho, a political ally and former staffer of Houston's. Piepho defeated Houston with 53 percent of the vote.

=== Fraud lawsuit ===
In 2004, Houston and his father, Fred, were sued by four former business clients who accused Houston of defrauding them out of $340,000. The lawsuit came after Fred filed for bankruptcy for his business, Winning Action Investments, in 2003. Houston settled the case in court in 2007.

== Personal life ==
Houston is married to Ingeborg "Inge" Sorensen, with whom he has three children: Bart, Sumner, and Glynnis Rose. Bart was the starting quarterback for the Wisconsin Badgers and was signed as an undrafted free agent by the Pittsburgh Steelers.

Houston and his wife live in San Ramon, California. Inge is a real estate agent and project developer and is currently the president and CEO of the Dublin Chamber of Commerce.

Houston is the director of baseball operations for the independent Dublin Leprechauns of the Pecos League.
