= Fino Factories & California Soups =

- Fino Fabrieken en California Soepen
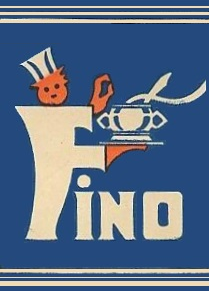
- The original Fino logo
- Formation: 1928
- Founder: Egbert J. Holtrust
- Founded at: Harderwijk, Netherlands
- Dissolved: 2009
- Locations: Voorthuizen, Netherlands; Whittier, California
- Products: Stock, bouillon, bouillon cubes
- Staff: 350

Fino Factories and California Soups (in Dutch: Fino Fabrieken en California Soepen) was a Dutch-American food company that produced soup stock, chicken boullion, vegetable seasoning, and gravy base from 1928 until 2009. The ways in which the company employed its brands "Fino" and "California" changed with time and place.

== History ==
The Fino company was founded in Harderwijk, Netherlands in 1928 by Egbert J. Holtrust. The company employed the brands "Fino" and "California" differently based on location and various product designations changed over time as well. In the Netherlands, the Fino brand was used both for manufacturing and retail products from 1932 to 1973. After 1973, "Fino" only designated the factory whereas "California" was the brand used on the products. In 1952, Fino expanded into the United States, trademarking the brand name "California" for its US products. For the full duration of the company's operations into the United States, "Fino" always designated the manufacturing branch and "California" designated the company's retail brand.

Throughout its history, Fino was registered as a naamloze vennootschap, which is a Dutch legal designation for a joint-stock company. In 1965, Organon International instigated a partial merge with Fino. In 1973, California became the primary name for all products produced in the Fino factory. In 2009, Struik Foods Europe purchased California Soepen and discontinued distribution of its former products.

== Cookbooks ==
Throughout its existence, the Fino company published several cookbooks with recipes advising how to best use their products. In 1941, for example, Fino published De Fino Kook-Gids: Met Verschillende Smakelijke Recepten (in English: The Fino Cooking Guide with Different Tasty Recipes). At this time, Fino had not yet expanded into the American market. In 1973, Fino published De Plezierige Keuken (in English: The Pleasant Kitchen).

== Legacy ==
The Fino company has been recognized for the role it played in the province of Gelderland during the Dutch Famine of 1944-45, commonly known as "the Hunger Winter." According to Dutch scholar Henri A. Van Der Zee, the Fino company fed "3000 people - a total of 150,000 people during the whole winter."

In 2010, a monumental plaque was installed in Harderwijk to commemorate the role that Fino played in the Hunger Winter.

== Products ==
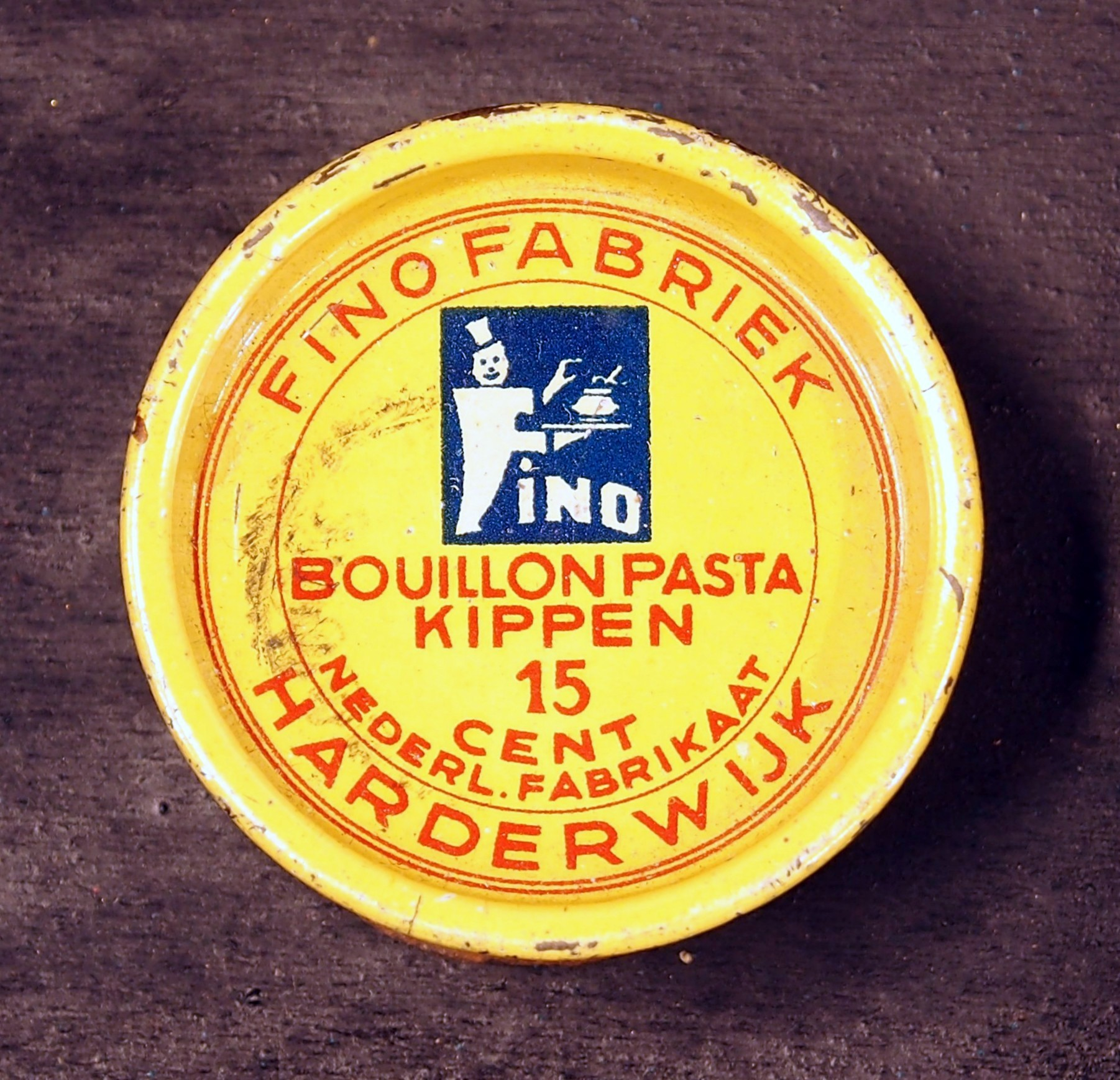
The company's retail products sold in the Netherlands kept the factory name "Fino" until 1973

=== Fino products ===
- Stock
- Boullion
- Boullion cubes
- Gravy base

=== California products ===
- Groentesoup Potage Legumes
- Tomatensoep met soepballetjes
- Soepen Potage
- één kops Tomaat
- één kops Kip
- Potage Pois
- Erwtensoep

== Gallery ==
Fino Factories & California Soups
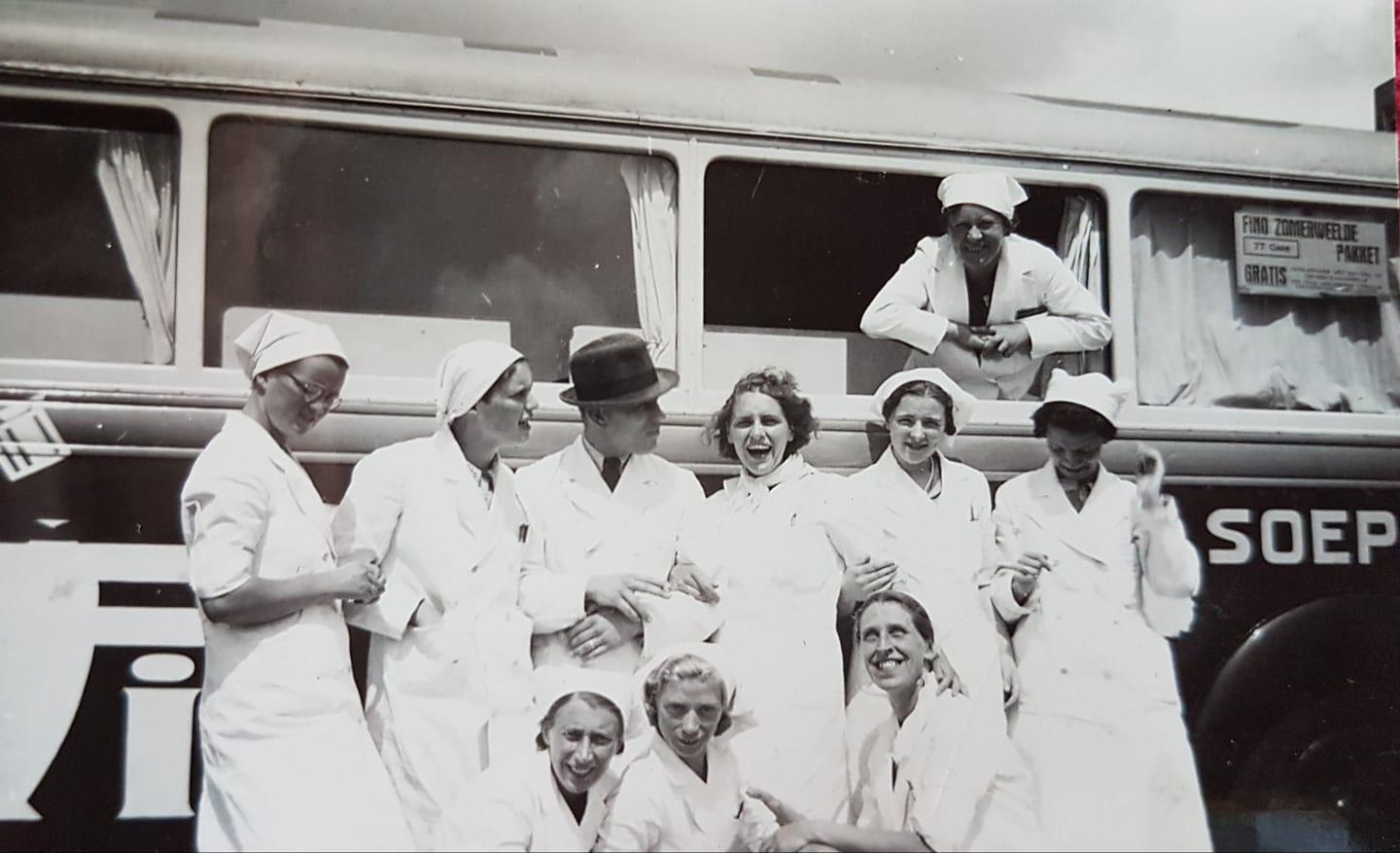
Fino employees in the 1950s

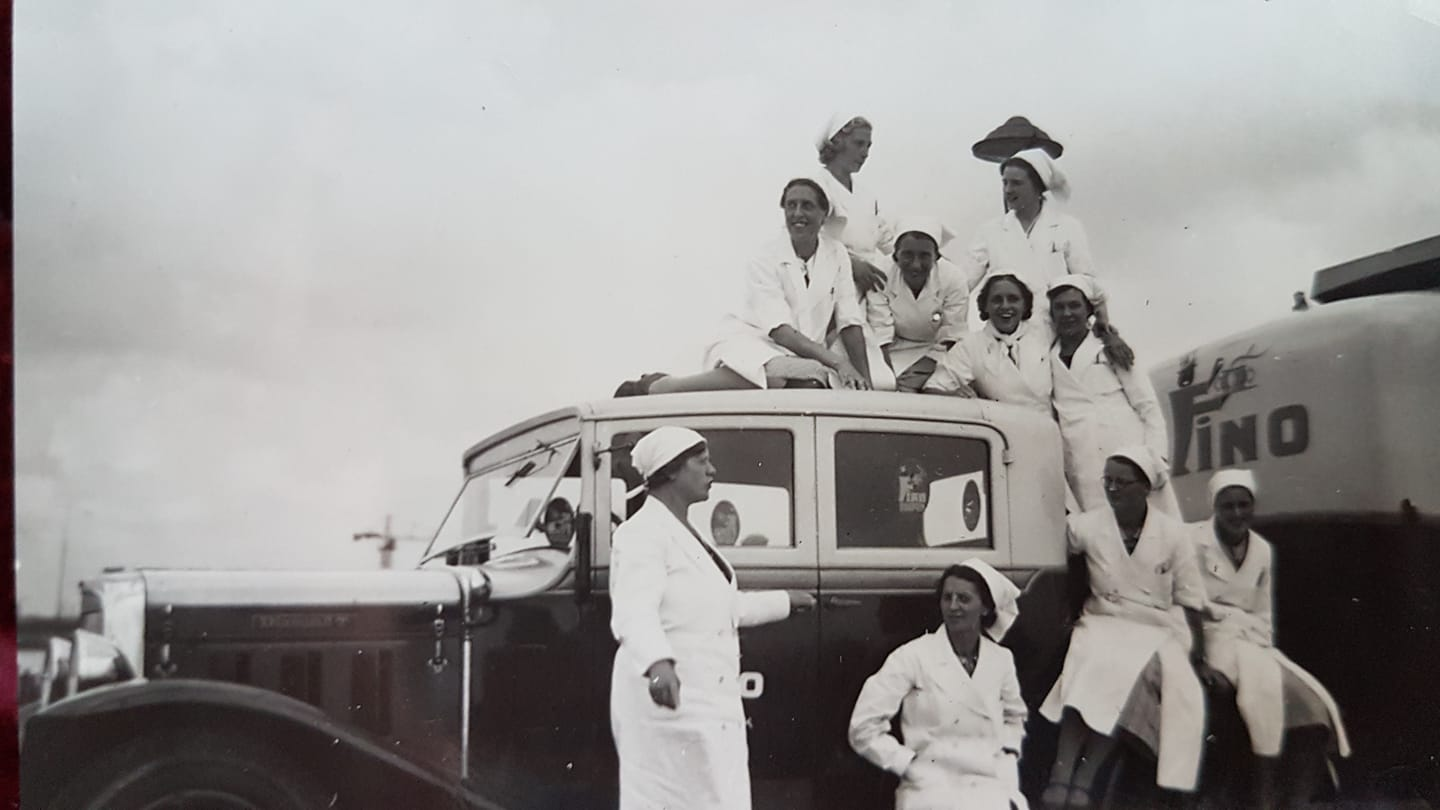
Staff stand in front of a Fino truck

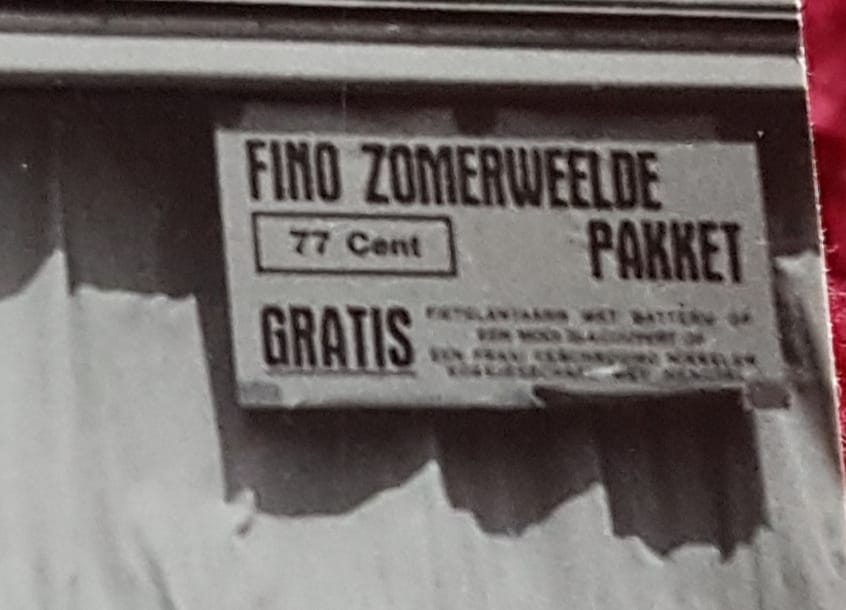
Company sign

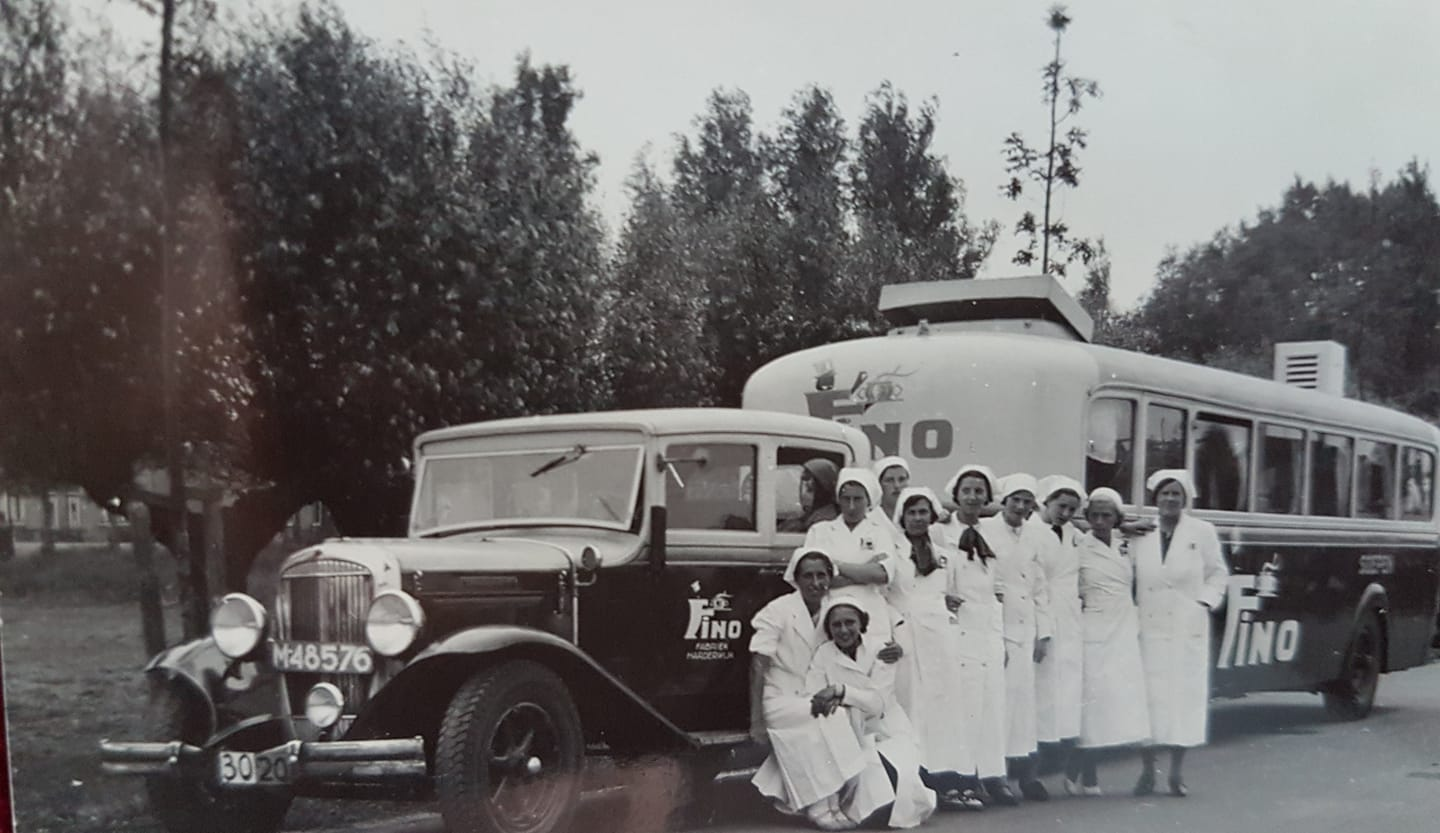
Soup staff with truck and bus
