= Richard Rainey =

American politician (1938–2021)

Member of the California Senate from the 7th district
- In office December 2, 1996 – November 30, 2000
- Preceded by: Daniel Boatwright
- Succeeded by: Tom Torlakson

Member of the California State Assembly from the 15th district
- In office December 7, 1992 – November 30, 1996
- Preceded by: William P. Baker
- Succeeded by: Lynne Leach

Personal details
- Born: December 5, 1938 Medford, Oregon
- Died: July 4, 2021 (aged 82) Walnut Creek, California
- Party: Republican
- Spouse: Sue McNulty (m. 1987)
- Children: 7
- Education: Sacramento State University; Golden Gate University

Richard Rainey (December 5, 1938 – July 4, 2021) was an American politician from Walnut Creek, California, a suburb in the San Francisco Bay Area. He served in the California State Assembly from 1992 until 1996 and then served in the State Senate from 1996 until 2000 when he was defeated for reelection by Tom Torlakson, a Democratic Assemblyman from Antioch. In 1995, Mr. Rainey was named Legislator of the Year by the California Probation & Parole Correctional Association. Also, during the 1995–96 legislative session, Mr. Rainey served as Chairman of the Assembly Local Government Committee when the Republicans briefly had a majority in the State Assembly.

== Background ==
Rainey was born in Medford, Oregon. He became a police officer in Compton, California in 1962. He was hired by the Contra Costa County Sheriff's department in 1964 and he was promoted through the ranks as a deputy sheriff, sergeant, lieutenant, and captain before he was elected County Sheriff in 1978. Mr. Rainey was appointed by Governor George Deukmejian during the 1980s to the State Board of Corrections and the Board of Trustees of the Robert Presley Institute of Corrections. He served until 1992 when he was elected to the Assembly to replace Bill Baker who was elected to Congress.

Rainey has a bachelor's degree in administration of justice from Sacramento State University (1973) and a master's degree in public administration from Golden Gate University (1976).

Rainey was married to Sue Rainey (née McNulty) and they resided in Walnut Creek. They have 7 adult children between them. Brett, Michael and Gina from Richard's 1st marriage to Micki DiLoreto (Micki died from cancer 4/86) and Rob, Steve, Kathy and Kevin from Sue's 1st marriage.

He died of melanoma on July 4, 2021, in Walnut Creek, California, at age 82.

Political offices
Preceded by Bill Baker	California State Assemblyman, 15th District; 1992–1996	Succeeded by Lynne Leach
Preceded by Daniel Boatwright	California State Senate, 7th District; 1996–2000	Succeeded by Tom Torlakson
Preceded by Art Agnos	HUD Regional Administrator, Region 9; 2003–2009	Succeeded by Ophelia Basgal
