= Ellen Tauscher =

American politician, businesswoman, and diplomat (1951–2019)

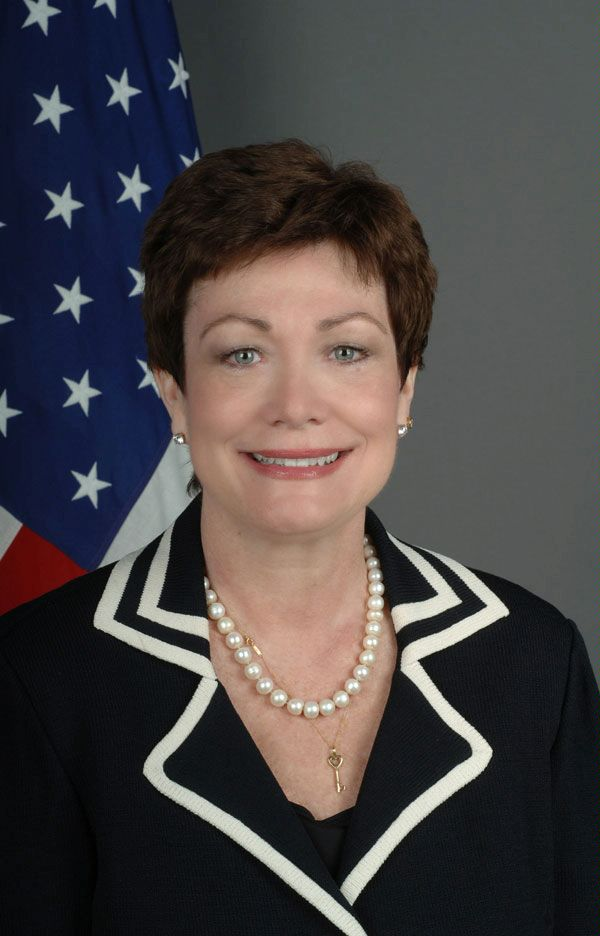
- Official State Department portrait

15th Under Secretary of State for Arms Control and International Security Affairs
- In office June 26, 2009 – February 7, 2012
- President: Barack Obama
- Preceded by: Robert Joseph
- Succeeded by: Rose Gottemoeller

Member of the U.S. House of Representatives from California's 10th district
- In office January 3, 1997 – June 26, 2009
- Preceded by: Bill Baker
- Succeeded by: John Garamendi

Personal details
- Born: Ellen O'Kane; November 15, 1951 Newark, New Jersey, U.S.
- Died: April 29, 2019 (aged 67) Stanford, California, U.S.
- Party: Democratic
- Spouses: William Tauscher (m. 1989; div. 1999); James Cieslak (m. 2009; div. 2011)
- Children: 1
- Education: Seton Hall University (BS)

Ellen O'Kane Tauscher (November 15, 1951 – April 29, 2019) was an American businesswoman, diplomat, and Democratic Party politician who was the U.S. representative for California's 10th congressional district from 1997 to 2009. From 2009 to 2012, she served as the Under Secretary of State for Arms Control and International Security Affairs. She then served as Special Envoy for Strategic Stability and Missile Defense at the U.S. State Department.

While in Congress, Tauscher was a leading centrist Democrat, and the chair of the New Democrat Coalition, a caucus of moderate Democrats in the House of Representatives. She also served as vice-chairwoman of the Democratic Leadership Council from 2001 to 2005.

== Early life and career ==
Ellen Tauscher was born in Newark, New Jersey, the daughter of John E. O'Kane, a shop steward for the United Food and Commercial Workers union at a ShopRite store in Union City, and his wife Sally, a secretary for Marsh & McLennan in New York City. She graduated in 1974 from Seton Hall University, where she obtained a Bachelor of Science degree in early childhood education.

She then worked as an investment banker with Bache & Co. and, at age 25, was the youngest and one of the first women to become a member of the New York Stock Exchange. She also served as an officer of the American Stock Exchange from 1979 to 1983, after which she worked for Bear Stearns and a subsidiary of Drexel Burnham Lambert.

In 1989, Tauscher moved to California and later founded the ChildCare Registry, the first national research service to help parents verify the background of childcare workers. She also published The ChildCare Sourcebook and headed the Tauscher Foundation, which provided funds for elementary schools to buy computers and Internet access.

== Political career ==
Before running for the United States House of Representatives, Tauscher was active in Democratic circles as a fundraiser and also chaired Dianne Feinstein's successful 1992 and 1994 Senate campaigns.

In 1996, Tauscher was recruited to run against two-term Republican incumbent Bill Baker in California's 10th congressional district, which included several wealthy suburbs in the East Bay. During the campaign, Tauscher emphasized balancing the federal budget, her support for business, the environment, and the military. She also charged that Baker was too conservative for the district, particularly given his opposition to abortion and gun control. She narrowly defeated Baker, claiming victory by a margin of 1.45% of the vote. The race was ranked as the fourth most expensive of that year's 435 House races.

Tauscher was re-elected in 1998 and 2000 against vigorous Republican opposition. While the 10th district was once considered "solid Republican territory," most Bay Area Republicans tend to be more moderate than their counterparts in the rest of California and since the 1990s have been increasingly willing to support Democrats at the national level.

In 2000, during the statewide redistricting process, some of the more Republican-leaning parts of Tauscher's district were removed and replaced with more Democratic territory near Berkeley and in Solano County. She was subsequently re-elected to four more terms, facing no substantive opposition and receiving more than 65 percent of the vote after 2002.

In the House of Representatives, Tauscher served on the Armed Services Committee and the Transportation and Infrastructure Committee. She chaired the Strategic Forces subcommittee of the Armed Services Committee, which oversees the country's nuclear weapons stockpile, missile defense program, and the national labs. Tauscher was the only member of Congress who had two national labs in her district, Lawrence Livermore National Laboratory and the California campus of Sandia National Laboratories. At the time she left Congress, Tauscher also was the senior member from California serving on the Highways and Transit subcommittee and the Aviation subcommittee of the Transportation and Infrastructure committee. From her position on the Transportation Committee, Tauscher brought $33 million to her district for transportation and infrastructure projects.

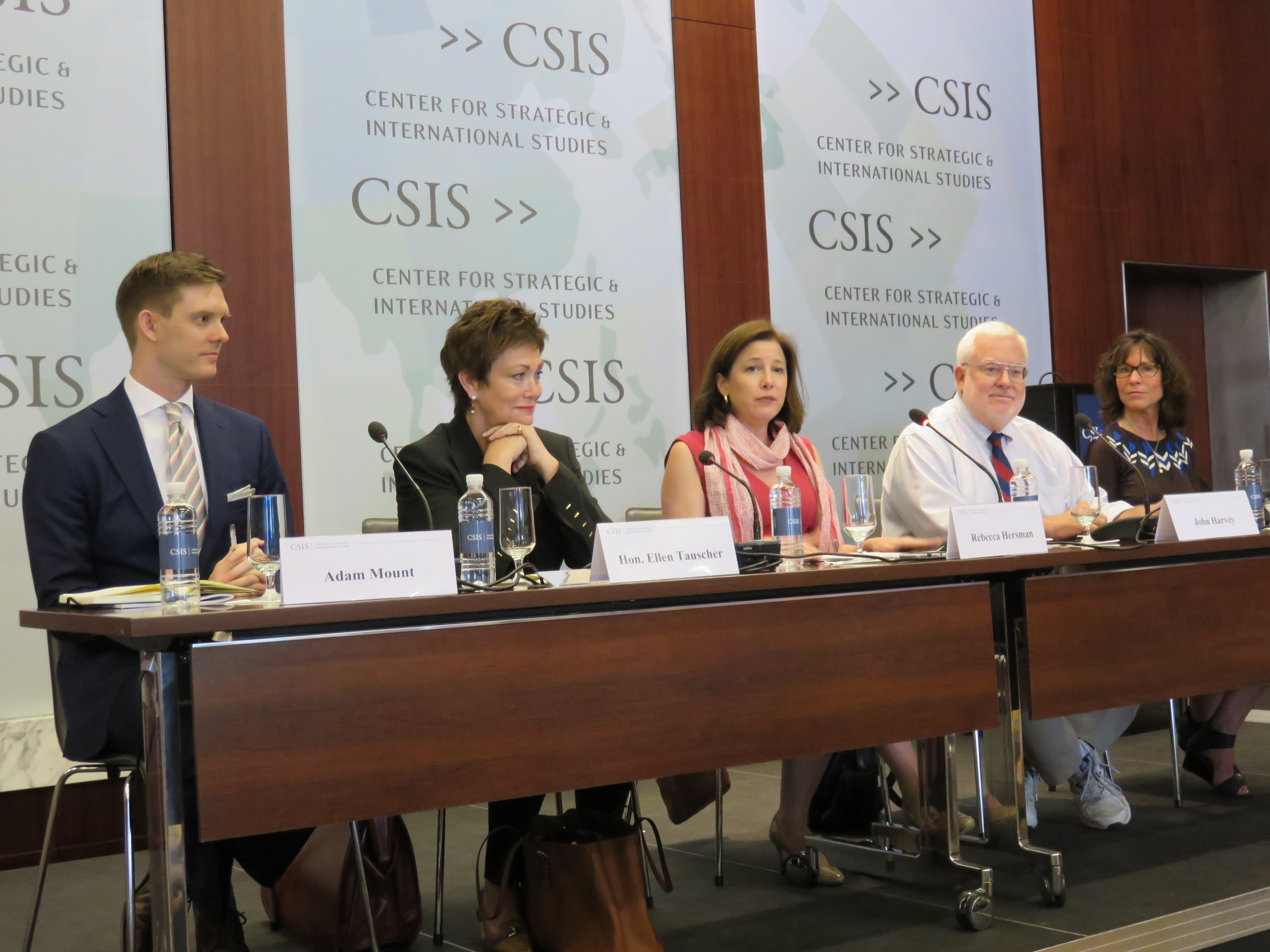
Tauscher (second from left) at the Center for Strategic and International Studies, Project on Nuclear Issues and Ploughshares Fund panel discussion, "Debate: U.S. Nuclear Weapon Modernization", Washington, D.C., June 29, 2017

On March 18, 2009, President Obama nominated Tauscher to the position of Under Secretary of State for Arms Control and International Security. She was confirmed by the United States Senate on June 25, 2009, by unanimous consent. Notwithstanding her appointment, confirmation and acceptance, she served as Speaker Pro Tempore on June 26, 2009, when the House narrowly passed (219–212) a cap-and-trade global warming bill. Tauscher resigned her seat on June 26, 2009, after voting was finished on the American Clean Energy & Security Act. Her resignation necessitated a special election. Tauscher served as Under Secretary of State for Arms Control and International Security until her appointment on February 6, 2012, as Special Envoy for Strategic Stability and Missile Defense. Tauscher retired from the State Department on August 31, 2012.

As Under Secretary of State, Tauscher successfully negotiated the New START treaty with the Russian Federation in March 2010. The first major agreement signed with Russia in nearly 20 years, the treaty was signed by Presidents Barack Obama and Dmitri Medvedev on April 8, 2010, and ratified by the U.S. Senate on December 22, 2010. Tauscher represented the United States at the U.N. NPT review conference that is held every five years to review the status of the nuclear non-proliferation treaty (NPT). The 2010 conference was the first in 10 years to result in a consensus agreement. Tauscher was also the lead official in the State Department working on the bilateral agreements with Poland, Romania, and Turkey for the European Phased Adaptive Approach missile defense system, negotiating timely agreements that allowed the President's deployment timeline to be met.

In 2008, Tauscher was a strong supporter of Hillary Clinton's candidacy for president. She traveled around the country as a surrogate for Clinton's campaign in the primary. In 2013, she was one of the first prominent elected officials to join the Ready for Hillary effort which became one of the largest independent grassroots efforts on behalf of an undeclared Presidential candidate in history.

== Political views ==
A leading centrist Democrat, Tauscher was the chairwoman of the New Democrat Coalition, a caucus of moderate Democrats in the House. She also served as vice-chairwoman of the Democratic Leadership Council from 2001 to 2005.

Tauscher received an 11% lifetime rating from the American Conservative Union, and a 95% rating for her 2008 voting record from Americans for Democratic Action.

While in Congress, she supported universal health care and, in particular, covering uninsured children through the State Children's Health Insurance Program (SCHIP). She also supported scaling back the estate tax, tightening bankruptcy rules, and expanding free trade.

=== Abortion ===
Tauscher was strongly pro-choice. She received a 100% positive rating from NARAL. She voted against bans on late-term and partial-birth abortions.

She also supported federal funding of stem cell research, voting in favor of both Stem Cell Research Enhancement Acts.

=== Gun rights ===
Tauscher was in favor of more extensive gun control. She expressed her support for the Second Amendment, but has also said that "we should keep guns out of the hands of criminals and those with history of violence." She called for "common sense gun safety legislation that strikes a balance between Second Amendment protections and protections for the public."

While in Congress, she supported arming commercial pilots (called, Federal Flight Deck Officer or FFDO), requiring background checks of legal gun owners, and banning Saturday night specials. She received an F grade from the NRA Political Victory Fund.

=== Iraq war ===
In October 2002, Tauscher voted in favor of the Iraq Resolution, approving the use of military force in Iraq. However, she later became a critic of the Iraq War, while continuing to vote for funding for the War (see HR 1585). In December 2005, Tauscher led a group of twenty-two other House Democrats in sending a letter to President George W. Bush urging him to withdraw U.S. troops, expressing the hope that the "Iraqi government takes increased responsibility" for its political and security needs. She later voted to redeploy troops out of Iraq within 90 days and even to impeach President Bush over the war.

=== LGBT issues ===
Tauscher was an early proponent of same-sex marriage, publicly stating in 2004 in response to President George W. Bush's call for a constitutional amendment to ban same-sex marriage, "It is clear to me that this is the civil rights issue of the 21st century, and it is unambiguous in my mind that the government cannot discriminate by gender the rights conferred by the state in marriage." In 2006, she voted against the Federal Marriage Amendment, which would have constitutionally defined marriage as being between a man and woman.

On March 3, 2009, Tauscher introduced the Military Readiness Enhancement Act of 2009 to the House of Representatives, which would have repealed Don't Ask, Don't Tell. The bill eventually passed in a slightly different form in 2010 after Tauscher had left the House, repealing Don't Ask, Don't Tell.

She was opposed to banning gays from the Boy Scouts. She had a 100% rating from the Human Rights Campaign, the largest gay rights advocacy group in the United States.

== Career after politics ==
After leaving the State Department, Tauscher assumed a number of publicly held corporate and non-profit board positions, including serving on the boards of Edison International/Southern California Edison (EIX) in Rosemead, California, and eHealth (EHTH) in Mountain View, California. She served on the Board of Advisors of SpaceX and the Board of Directors of BAE Systems, Invacare Corporation, and SeaWorld Entertainment. She was a member of the Board of Governors of The Commonwealth Club of California. She served as vice chair of the Atlantic Council's Brent Scowcroft Center on International Security and was a member of the University of California Board of Regents.

She also served as chairman of the Board of Governors for Los Alamos National Security and Lawrence Livermore National Security, a member of the board of directors of the National Comprehensive Cancer Network, and was chairman of the board of the National Comprehensive Cancer Network Foundation.

In August 2013, the Alliance for Bangladesh Worker Safety elected Tauscher as independent chairperson. The Alliance is a coalition of some of the largest clothing retailers and brands in North America, including Wal-Mart, Target, the Gap, Costco, and VF Brands. The Alliance is working with the government of Bangladesh, factory owners, and international organizations to improve worker safety for Bangladeshi garment workers.

Tauscher was also a strategic advisor to the Washington, D.C. law firm of Baker Donelson on matters of defense, transportation, energy, and health care.

Tauscher was a member of the ReFormers Caucus of Issue One.

== Personal life and death ==
Tauscher lived in Pleasanton and later Alamo, California, during her Congressional career. Prior to their divorce in 1999, she was married to William Tauscher, former chairman and CEO of Vanstar Corporation, current director of Safeway, Inc., and founder of the Tauscher Group, which invests and assists in the management of enterprises in home products, transportation, security and real estate. She had a daughter, Katherine (born 1991).

On the same day as her taking the office of Under Secretary, she married widower James Cieslak, a retired pilot for Delta Air Lines. They divorced in 2011.

In July 2010, Tauscher was diagnosed with Stage 3 esophageal cancer, one of the fastest growing cancers in the United States and one of the deadliest, with a survival rate of 18%. After a grueling regimen of chemotherapy, radiation, and surgery to remove her esophagus, Tauscher was declared cancer-free in December 2010. Following that time, she was active as a board member of the National Comprehensive Cancer Network (NCCN) and as chair of the NCCN Foundation, as well as speaking around the country, advocating for more information, more funding and earlier screening for the disease.

Tauscher died of pneumonia on April 29, 2019, at the age of 67 at the Stanford University Medical Center, in Stanford, California.

== Electoral history ==
1996 United States House of Representatives elections
Party	Candidate	Votes	%
Democratic	Ellen Tauscher	137,726	48.7
Republican	Bill Baker (incumbent)	133,633	47.2
Reform	John Place	6,354	2.3
Natural Law	Valerie Janlois	3,047	1.0
Libertarian	Gregory Lyon	2,423	0.8
Total votes		283,183	100.0
Turnout			
Democratic gain from Republican			

1998 United States House of Representatives elections
Party	Candidate	Votes	%
Democratic	Ellen Tauscher (incumbent)	127,134	53.46
Republican	Charles Ball	103,299	43.44
Natural Law	Valerie Janlois	3,941	1.66
Reform	John Place	3,435	1.44
Total votes		237,809	100.0
Turnout			
Democratic hold			

2000 United States House of Representatives elections
Party	Candidate	Votes	%
Democratic	Ellen Tauscher (incumbent)	160,429	52.7
Republican	Claude B. Hutchison, Jr.	134,863	44.2
Natural Law	Valerie Janlois	9,527	3.1
Total votes		304,819	100.0
Turnout			
Democratic hold			

2002 United States House of Representatives elections
Party	Candidate	Votes	%
Democratic	Ellen Tauscher (incumbent)	123,481	75.6
Libertarian	Sonia E. Alonso Harden	39,858	24.4
Total votes		163,339	100.0
Turnout			
Democratic hold			

2004 United States House of Representatives elections
Party	Candidate	Votes	%
Democratic	Ellen Tauscher (incumbent)	182,750	65.8
Republican	Jeff Ketelson	95,349	34.2
Total votes		278,099	100.0
Turnout			
Democratic hold			

2006 United States House of Representatives elections
Party	Candidate	Votes	%
Democratic	Ellen Tauscher (incumbent)	130,859	66.5
Republican	Darcy Linn	66,069	33.5
Republican	Jeff Ketelson (write-in)	50	0.0
Total votes		196,978	100.0
Turnout			
Democratic hold			

2008 United States House of Representatives elections
Party	Candidate	Votes	%
Democratic	Ellen Tauscher (incumbent)	192,226	65.1
Republican	Nicholas Gerber	91,877	31.1
Peace and Freedom	Eugene Ruyle	11,062	3.8
Total votes		295,165	100.0
Turnout			
Democratic hold			

== See also ==
- Women in the United States House of Representatives

U.S. House of Representatives
Preceded by William Baker	Member of the U.S. House of Representatives from California's 10th congressional district 1997–2009	Succeeded by John Garamendi
Party political offices
Preceded by Jim Davis; Ron Kind; Adam Smith	Chair of the New Democrat Coalition; 2005–2009; Served alongside: Artur Davis and Ron Kind (2005–2007)	Succeeded by Joe Crowley
Political offices
Preceded by John Rood	Under Secretary of State for Arms Control and International Security Affairs; 2009–2012	Succeeded by Rose Gottemoeller
