= H. Abram Wilson =

American politician (born 1946)

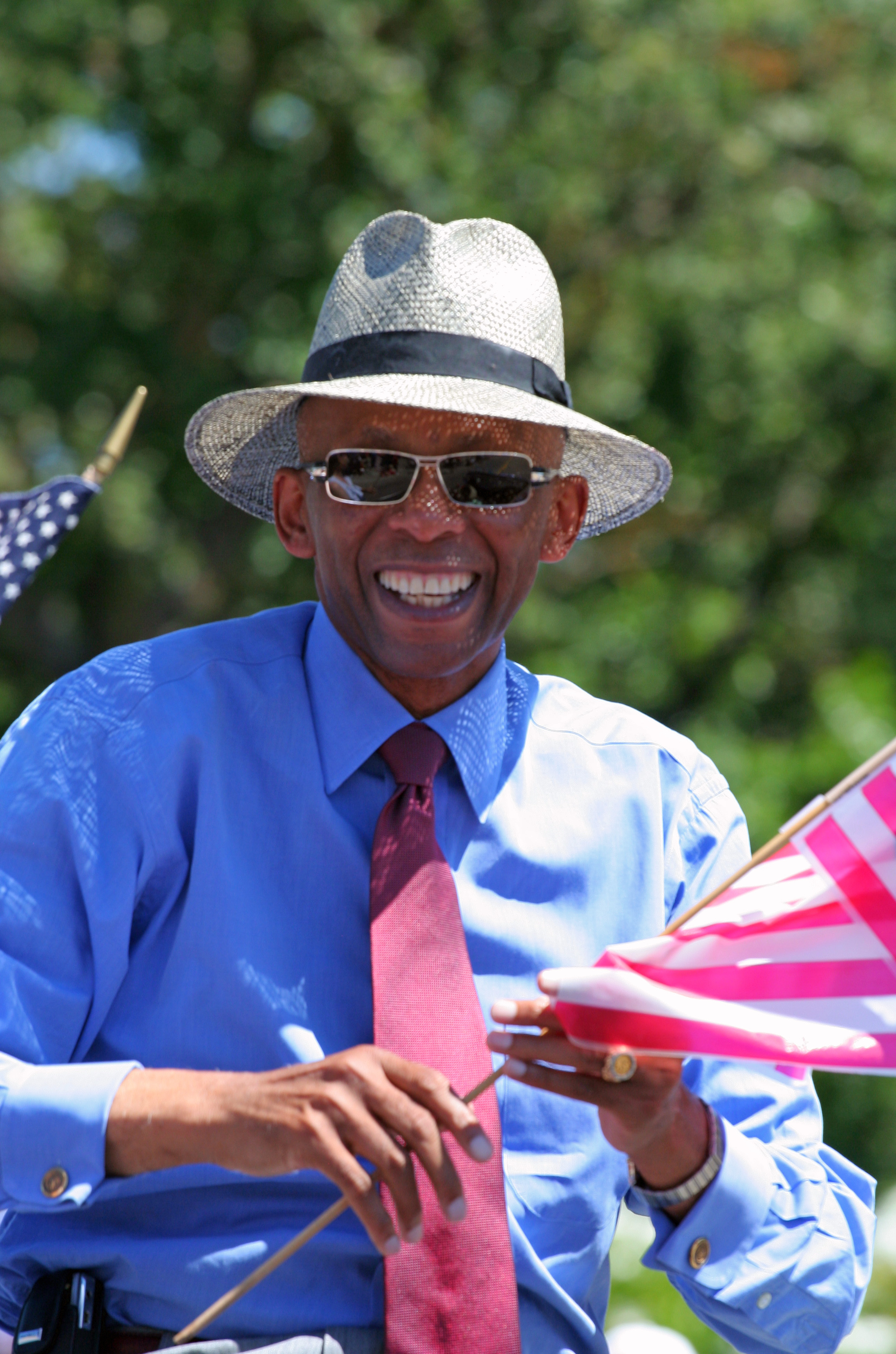
- H. Abram Wilson, July 4, 2010

Mayor of San Ramon, California
- In office 2002–2008

Personal details
- Born: 1946 (age 79–80)
- Party: Republican
- Spouse: Karen Wilson
- Children: 2
- Education: B.S. Central State University

H. (Harold) Abram Wilson (born 1946) is a Republican politician and a former mayor of San Ramon, California.

== Early life ==
Wilson was born in Charleston, South Carolina in 1946, the son of two educators. His great grandfather had been one of the first physicians in South Carolina. He also lived in Philadelphia, Pennsylvania as a child.

Wilson attended Central State University, where he was the president of his senior class. He spent his summers in San Francisco. While in college, he studied voice and has performed in professional chorus' and earned a BS in Biochemistry.

A proud veteran, in 1969 he entered the United States Army. When he reported for duty in Ft. Bragg, his superiors asked him if he was a member of the Black Panthers, due to his having arrived from San Francisco.

When he returned to civilian life, he worked as a federal funds trader at Wells-Fargo.

== Family ==
H. Abram Wilson is married to Dr. Karen B. Wilson. He has 2 children, Natausha Wilson-Cruz and P. Nathan Wilson.

== Political career ==
=== San Ramon City ===
Wilson was elected to the San Ramon City Council in November 1999, appointed mayor in 2002, and became the City of San Ramon’s first elected mayor in 2003. He was re-elected in 2005. Wilson was the 2005 recipient of the National Music Educator Association, State Legislator of the Year award "for his support of music education in the schools."

=== 2008 California State Assembly campaign ===
Wilson unsuccessfully ran for State Assembly in 2008. He ran in California's 15th district against Democrat Joan Buchanan. Assembly District 15 includes areas of Contra Costa, Alameda, Sacramento, and San Joaquin counties. Buchanan won the election by 52% to 48% .

== See also ==
- List of first African-American mayors
- African American mayors in California
