= Anamarie Avila Farias =

American politician

Anamarie Ávila Farías
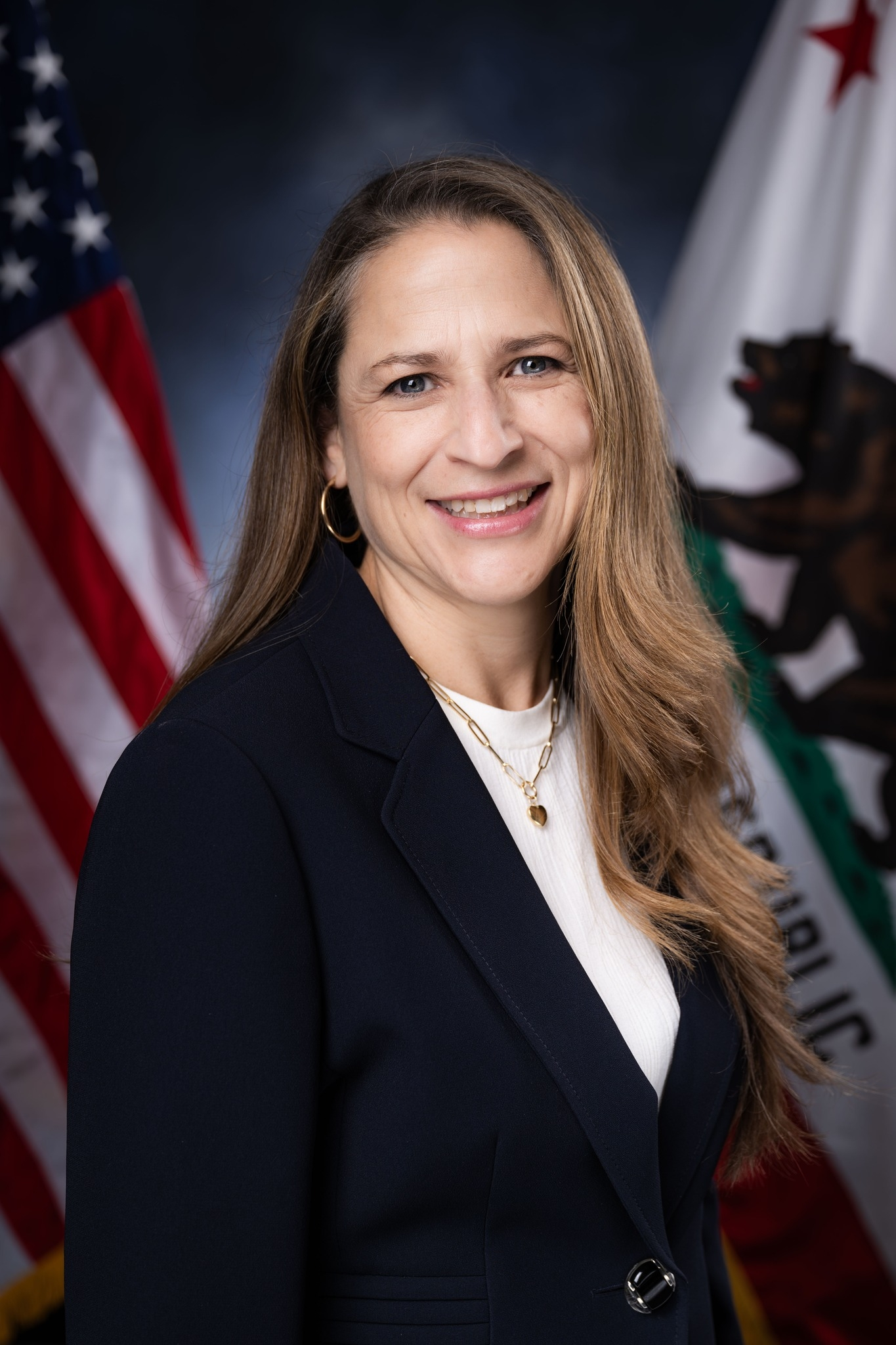
- Official portrait, 2024

Member of the California State Assembly from the 15th district
- Incumbent
- Assumed office December 2, 2024
- Preceded by: Tim Grayson

Personal details
- Born: 1973 (age 52–53) Martinez, California, U.S.
- Party: Democratic
- Spouse: Isidro Farias

Anamarie Ávila Farías is an American politician who is a member of the California State Assembly from the 15th district since 2024. She previously served on the Contra Costa County Board of Education, the California Housing Finance Agency board, and the Martinez City Council.

== Early life ==
Ávila Farías was born in Martinez, California She is the granddaughter of immigrants from Mexico who came to the United States through the Bracero Program.

== Early political career ==
Ávila Farías was elected to a single term on the Martinez City Council in 2012, becoming the first Latina elected to the body. She was appointed to the California Housing Finance Agency Board of Directors by Governor Jerry Brown in 2015 and re-appointed by Gavin Newsom in 2021.

In 2017, Ávila Farías and a group of activists filed a lawsuit under the California Voting Rights Act alleging the Martinez Unified School District board diluted minority-representation through at-large elections. The board ultimately split the board representation into districts and paid $90,000 in legal fees.

In 2022, Ávila Farías made a Facebook post encouraging boycotting the 4th of July because of the Dobbs v. Jackson Women's Health Organization ruling.

=== 2016 Contra Costa County Supervisor campaign ===
Ávila Farías ran for Contra Costa County Board of Supervisors in 2016, losing to incumbent Federal Glover.

== California State Assembly ==
Ávila Farías ran in the 2024 election for the California State Assembly in the 15th district after the incumbent Assemblymember, Tim Grayson, announced that he would forgo reelection and run for the California State Senate instead. Ávila Farías and Republican Sonia Ledo advanced to the general election. Ávila Farías was elected. As of the end of the 2025 session, Ávila Farías was a member of the standing committees on Aging and Long-Term Care; Housing and Community Development; Military and Veterans Affairs; Water, Parks and Wildlife, and Insurance, and was co-chair of the Select Committee on Housing Finance and Affordability, and a member of several other select committees. In her first session in the Assembly, she authored a number of bills on housing, education, and other issues.

In January 2026, Ávila Farías introduced a bill to bar people employed by ICE between September 2025 and January 2029 from working in law enforcement or the public school system in California.

== Electoral history ==
=== Martinez City Council ===
2012 Martinez City Council election
Candidate	Votes	%
Anamarie Ávila Farías	8,060	30.6
Mark Ross	7,863	29.9
Dylan Radke	6,605	25.1
Arsenio "Chaz" Escudero	2,219	8.4
Mike Alford	1,485	5.6
Write-in	106	0.4
Total votes	26,338	100.0

=== Contra Costa County Supervisor ===
2016 Contra Costa County Supervisor 5th district election
Primary election
Candidate	Votes	%
Federal Glover	13,101	34.2
Anamarie Ávila Farías	12,125	31.7
Michael Menesini	5,541	14.5
Dan Romero	5,217	13.6
Conrad Dandridge	2,123	5.6
Write-in	145	0.4
Total votes	38,252	100.0
General election
Federal Glover	36,371	53.1
Anamarie Ávila Farías	31,856	46.5
Write-in	311	0.5
Total votes	68,538	100.0

=== California State Assembly ===
2024 California State Assembly 15th district election
Primary election
Party	Candidate	Votes	%
Republican	Sonia Ledo	30,962	31.9
Democratic	Anamarie Ávila Farías	29,525	30.4
Democratic	Monica Wilson	24,792	25.5
Democratic	Karen Mitchoff	11,917	12.3
Total votes		97,196	100.0
General election
Democratic	Anamarie Ávila Farías	131,850	64.1
Republican	Sonia Ledo	73,762	35.9
Total votes		205,612	100.0
Democratic hold			
