= California's 15th State Assembly district =

American legislative district

Current assemblymember
Anamarie Avila Farias; D–Martinez
- Population (2020): 512,289
- Demographics: 37.03% White; 9.78% Black; 31.96% Latino; 13.78% Asian; 0.28% Native American; 0.71% Hawaiian/Pacific Islander; 0.67% other; 5.79% remainder of multiracial
- Registered voters: 310,142
- Registration: 69.54% Democratic; 5.64% Republican; 21.01% No party preference

California's 15th State Assembly district is one of 80 California State Assembly districts. It is currently represented by Democrat Anamarie Avila Farias of Martinez.

== District profile ==
The district encompasses the northern coastal East Bay from Martinez to Brentwood. The district is centered on Concord and Antioch.

Contra Costa County – 43.86%

- Antioch
- Brentwood
- Clayton
- Concord
- Martinez
- Pittsburg
- Pleasant Hill
- Walnut Creek – 0.50%

== Election results from statewide races ==
Year	Office	Results
2022	Senator	Padilla 67.2% – 32.8%
2022	Governor	Newsom 65.3 – 34.7%
2021	Recall	No 71.5 – 28.5%
2020	President	Biden 71.8 – 25.8%
2018	Governor	Newsom 69.2 – 30.8%
2018	Senator	Feinstein 57.2 – 42.8%
2016	President	Clinton 69.7 – 24.5%
2016	Senator	Harris 69.1 – 30.9%
2014	Governor	Brown 70.4 – 29.6%
2012	President	Obama 68.7 – 28.7%
2012	Senator	Feinstein 71.8 – 28.2%

== List of assembly members representing the district ==
Due to redistricting, the 15th district has been moved around different parts of the state. The current iteration resulted from the 2021 redistricting by the California Citizens Redistricting Commission.

Assembly members	Party	Years served	Counties represented	Notes
Charles F. McGlashan	Republican	January 5, 1885 – January 3, 1887	Nevada	
John I. Sykes	Republican	January 3, 1887 – January 5, 1891	Nevada	
Thomas C. Hocking	Republican	January 5, 1891 – January 2, 1893	Nevada	
J. L. Sargent	Democratic	January 2, 1893 – January 7, 1895	Amador	
James H. Tibbits	Republican	January 7, 1895 – January 4, 1897	Amador	
Anthony Caminetti	Democratic	January 4, 1897 – January 1, 1901	Amador	
Frederick L. Stewart	Republican	January 1, 1901 – January 5, 1903	Amador	
Percival S. King	Republican	January 5, 1903 – January 7, 1907	Napa	
Frank W. Bush	Republican	January 7, 1907 – January 4, 1909	Napa	
Walter B. Griffiths	Republican	January 4, 1909 – January 6, 1913	Napa	
Hugh B. Bradford	Democratic	January 6, 1913 – January 4, 1915	Sacramento	
Lee Gebhart	Progressive	January 4, 1915 – January 3, 1921	Sacramento	Changed his party to Republican when he ran for a 2 term.
Percy G. West	Republican	January 3, 1921 – January 5, 1931	Sacramento	
Forsythe Charles Clowdsley	Republican	January 5, 1931 – January 2, 1933	San Joaquin	
William W. Hoffman	Republican	January 2, 1933 – January 7, 1935	Alameda	
Leon M. Donihue	Democratic	January 7, 1935 – January 2, 1939	Alameda	
Bernard A. Sheridan	Republican	January 2, 1939 – January 3, 1949	Alameda	
Luther H. Lincoln	Republican	January 3, 1949 – January 5, 1959	Alameda	
Nicholas C. Petris	Democratic	January 5, 1959 – January 2, 1967	Alameda	
March Fong Eu	Democratic	January 2, 1967 – November 30, 1974	Alameda	
Vacant		November 30, 1974 – March 13, 1975	Alameda	Carlos Bee was the Assemblymember-elect for the 14th district, and was an incumbent for the 13th district. He died on November 29, 1974, before he was sworn in for this seat.
S. Floyd Mori	Democratic	March 13, 1975 – November 30, 1980	Alameda	Sworn in after winning special election.
Gilbert Marguth	Republican	December 1, 1980 – November 30, 1982	Alameda	
William P. Baker	Republican	December 6, 1982 – November 30, 1992	Alameda, Contra Costa	
Richard Rainey	Republican	December 7, 1992 – November 30, 1996	Alameda, Contra Costa	
Lynne Leach	Republican	December 2, 1996 – November 30, 2002	Alameda, Contra Costa	
Guy Houston	Republican	December 2, 2002 – November 30, 2008	Alameda, Contra Costa, Sacramento, San Joaquin	Retired to unsuccessfully run for Contra Costa County Board of Supervisors
Joan Buchanan	Democratic	December 1, 2008 – November 30, 2012	Alameda, Contra Costa, Sacramento, San Joaquin	Redistricted to the 16th district
Nancy Skinner	Democratic	December 3, 2012 – November 30, 2014	Alameda, Contra Costa	Redistricted from the 16th district
Tony Thurmond	Democratic	December 1, 2014 – November 30, 2018	Alameda, Contra Costa	Retired to successfully run for California State Superintendent of Public Instruction
Buffy Wicks	Democratic	December 3, 2018 – November 30, 2022	Alameda, Contra Costa	Redistricted to the 14th district
Tim Grayson	Democratic	December 5, 2022 – November 30, 2024	Alameda, Contra Costa	Redistricted from the 14th district
Anamarie Avila Farias	Democratic	December 2, 2024 – present	Contra Costa	

== Election results (1990–present) ==
=== 2024 ===
2024 California State Assembly 15th district election
Primary election
Party	Candidate	Votes	%
Republican	Sonia Ledo	30,962	31.9
Democratic	Anamarie Avila Farias	29,525	30.4
Democratic	Monica Wilson	24,792	25.5
Democratic	Karen Mitchoff	11,917	12.3
Total votes		97,196	100.0
General election
Democratic	Anamarie Avila Farias	131,850	64.1
Republican	Sonia Ledo	73,762	35.9
Total votes		205,612	100.0
Democratic hold			

=== 2022 ===
2022 California State Assembly 15th district election
Primary election
Party	Candidate	Votes	%
Democratic	Tim Grayson	61,742	68.4
Republican	Janell Proctor	28,501	31.6
Total votes		90,243	100.0
General election
Democratic	Tim Grayson	100,712	67.3
Republican	Janell Proctor	48,911	32.7
Total votes		149,623	100.0
Democratic hold			

=== 2020 ===
2020 California State Assembly 15th district election
Primary election
Party	Candidate	Votes	%
Democratic	Buffy Wicks (incumbent)	135,623	83.6
No party preference	Sara Brink	13,841	8.5
Republican	Jeanne M. Solnordal	12,791	7.9
Total votes		162,255	100.0
General election
Democratic	Buffy Wicks (incumbent)	204,108	84.7
No party preference	Sara Brink	36,732	15.3
Total votes		240,840	100.0
Democratic hold			

=== 2018 ===
2018 California State Assembly 15th district election
Primary election
Party	Candidate	Votes	%
Democratic	Buffy Wicks	37,141	31.4
Democratic	Jovanka Beckles	18,733	15.8
Democratic	Dan Kalb	18,007	15.2
Democratic	Judy Appel	13,591	11.5
Democratic	Rochelle Pardue-Okimoto	9,826	8.3
Republican	Pranav Jandhyala	6,946	5.9
Democratic	Andy Katz	6,209	5.2
Democratic	Ben Bartlett	3,949	3.3
Democratic	Cheryl Sudduth	1,493	1.2
Democratic	Raquella Thaman	1,007	0.9
Democratic	Owen Poindexter	819	0.7
Democratic	Sergey Vikramsingh Piterman	689	0.6
Total votes		118,410	100.0
General election
Democratic	Tim Grayson	104,583	53.6
Democratic	Jovanka Beckles	90,405	46.4
Total votes		194,988	100.0
Democratic hold			

=== 2016 ===
2016 California State Assembly 15th district election
Primary election
Party	Candidate	Votes	%
Democratic	Tony Thurmond (incumbent)	124,136	91.1
Republican	Claire Chiara	12,083	8.9
Total votes		136,219	100.0
General election
Democratic	Tony Thurmond (incumbent)	189,530	89.4
Republican	Claire Chiara	22,528	10.6
Total votes		212,058	100.0
Democratic hold			

=== 2014 ===
2014 California State Assembly 15th district election
Primary election
Party	Candidate	Votes	%
Democratic	Elizabeth Echols	21,664	31.1
Democratic	Tony Thurmond	16,963	24.4
Democratic	Pamela Price	11,898	17.1
Republican	Rich Kinney	7,531	10.8
Democratic	Sam Kang	4,630	6.7
Democratic	Clarence Hunt	3,329	4.8
Peace and Freedom	Eugene E. Ruyle	2,426	3.5
No party preference	Bernt Rainer Wahl	1,132	1.6
Total votes		69,573	100.0
General election
Democratic	Tony Thurmond	66,661	54.3
Democratic	Elizabeth Echols	56,071	45.7
Total votes		122,732	100.0
Democratic hold			

=== 2012 ===
2012 California State Assembly 15th district election
Primary election
Party	Candidate	Votes	%
Democratic	Nancy Skinner (incumbent)	68,479	99.8
Peace and Freedom	Eugene Ruyle (write-in)	105	0.2
Total votes		68,584	100.0
General election
Democratic	Nancy Skinner (incumbent)	164,929	86.8
Peace and Freedom	Eugene Ruyle	25,167	13.2
Total votes		190,096	100.0
Democratic hold			

=== 2010 ===
2010 California State Assembly 15th district election
Party	Candidate	Votes	%
Democratic	Joan Buchanan (incumbent)	104,441	53.4
Republican	H. Abram Wilson	91,378	46.6
Total votes		195,819	100.0
Democratic hold			

=== 2008 ===
2008 California State Assembly 15th district election
Party	Candidate	Votes	%
Democratic	Joan Buchanan	125,897	52.2
Republican	H. Abram Wilson	115,096	47.8
Total votes		240,993	100.0
Democratic gain from Republican			

=== 2006 ===
2006 California State Assembly 15th district election
Party	Candidate	Votes	%
Republican	Guy Houston (incumbent)	89,039	54.8
Democratic	Terry Coleman	73,466	45.2
Total votes		157,505	100.0
Republican hold			

=== 2004 ===
2004 California State Assembly 15th district election
Party	Candidate	Votes	%
Republican	Guy Houston (incumbent)	113,079	55.2
Democratic	Elaine D. Shaw	91,709	44.8
Total votes		204,788	100.0
Republican hold			

=== 2002 ===
2002 California State Assembly 15th district election
Party	Candidate	Votes	%
Republican	Guy Houston	73,322	53.7
Democratic	Donna Gerber	63,349	46.3
Total votes		136,671	100.0
Republican hold			

=== 2000 ===
2000 California State Assembly 15th district election
Party	Candidate	Votes	%
Republican	Lynne C. Leach (incumbent)	123,522	61.3
Democratic	Gregory James Rolen	77,901	38.7
Total votes		201,423	100.0
Republican hold			

=== 1998 ===
1998 California State Assembly 15th district election
Party	Candidate	Votes	%
Republican	Lynne C. Leach (incumbent)	94,589	59.4
Democratic	Charles W. Brydon	60,662	38.1
Libertarian	R. Duncan Wheat	4,110	2.6
Total votes		159,361	100.0
Republican hold			

=== 1996 ===
1996 California State Assembly 15th district election
Party	Candidate	Votes	%
Republican	Lynne C. Leach (incumbent)	89,328	49.0
Democratic	Gail Murray	87,957	48.2
Natural Law	Martin Sproul	5,284	2.9
Total votes		152,569	100.0
Republican hold			

=== 1994 ===
1994 California State Assembly 15th district election
Party	Candidate	Votes	%
Republican	Richard Rainey (incumbent)	103,407	67.6
Democratic	David B. Kearns	49,554	32.4
Total votes		152,961	100.0
Republican hold			

=== 1992 ===
1992 California State Assembly 15th district election
Party	Candidate	Votes	%
Republican	Richard Rainey	109,037	58.6
Democratic	Charles W. Brydon	77,170	41.4
Total votes		186,207	100.0
Republican hold			

=== 1990 ===
1990 California State Assembly 15th district election
Party	Candidate	Votes	%
Republican	Bill Baker (incumbent)	75,624	55.1
Democratic	Wendell H. Williams	61,725	44.9
Total votes		137,349	100.0
Republican hold			

== See also ==
- California State Assembly
- California State Assembly districts
- Districts in California
