= California's 9th senatorial district =

American legislative district

California's 9th State Senate district
Current senator
Tim Grayson; D–Concord
- Population (2010) • Voting age • Citizen voting age: 940,601; 743,998; 595,108
- Demographics: 31.82% White; 19.81% Black; 23.94% Latino; 21.62% Asian; 0.55% Native American; 0.53% Hawaiian/Pacific Islander; 0.45% other; 1.28% remainder of multiracial
- Registered voters: 575,696
- Registration: 66.05% Democratic; 5.96% Republican; 23.78% No party preference

California's 9th senatorial district is one of 40 California State Senate districts. It is currently represented by Democrat Tim Grayson of Concord.

== District profile ==
=== 2020s ===
The district encompasses most of Contra Costa County, including Concord, Antioch, Pittsburg, Bay Point, Martinez, Pleasant Hill, Walnut Creek, Lafayette, Danville, San Ramon, and Orinda; along with Castro Valley, San Lorenzo, and San Leandro in Alameda County.

=== 2010s ===
It previously encompassed the East Bay and consists of the urban, coastal northwestern portion of Alameda County, and western portion of Contra Costa County, including Alameda, Oakland, Piedmont, Emeryville, Berkeley, El Cerrito, and Richmond; currently represented by the 7th district.

== Election results from statewide races ==
Year	Office	Results
2021	Recall	No 89.6 – 10.4%
2020	President	Biden 87.8 – 10.2%
2018	Governor	Newsom 88.9 – 11.1%
2018	Senator	Feinstein 59.8 – 40.2%
2016	President	Clinton 85.6 – 7.8%
2016	Senator	Harris 79.1 – 20.9%
2014	Governor	Brown 90.2 – 9.8%
2012	President	Obama 86.8 – 9.9%
2012	Senator	Feinstein 90.0 – 10.0%
2010	Governor	Brown 79.9 – 16.5%
2010	Senator	Boxer 79.5 – 16.7%
2008	President	Obama 84.0 – 14.1%
2006	Governor	Angelides 62.1 – 29.8%
2006	Senator	Feinstein 67.6 – 28.0%
2004	President	Kerry 81.1 – 17.5%
2004	Senator	Boxer 80.1 – 15.6%
2003	Recall	No 77.0 – 23.0%
2003	Recall	Bustamante 60.7 – 19.4%
2002	Governor	Davis 65.0 – 16.8%
2000	President	Gore 78.9 – 12.6%
2000	Senator	Feinstein 74.0 – 12.6%
1998	Governor	Davis 83.3 – 12.4%
1998	Senator	Boxer 80.9 – 16.6%
1996	President	Clinton 75.5 – 13.0%
1994	Governor	Brown 74.0 – 22.9%
1994	Senator	Feinstein 80.2 – 14.0%
1992	President	Clinton 77.3 – 12.5%
1992	Senator	Boxer 79.4 – 15.2%
1992	Senator	Feinstein 82.4 – 13.4%

== List of senators representing the district ==
Due to redistricting, the 9th district has been moved around different parts of the state. The current iteration resulted from the 2021 redistricting by the California Citizens Redistricting Commission.

Senators	Party	Years served	Counties represented	Notes
John J. Harrigan	Democratic	January 8, 1883 – January 5, 1885	San Francisco	Both Harrigan and McCarthy served together.
Timothy McCarthy	Democratic	January 8, 1883 - January 5, 1885	San Francisco	Both Harrigan and McCarthy served together.
Egisto C. Palmieri	Republican	January 5, 1885 – January 3, 1887	San Francisco	Both Palmieri and Parkinson served together.
George C. Parkinson	Republican	January 5, 1885 – January 3, 1887	San Francisco	Both Palmieri and Parkinson served together.
Henry Clay Gesford	Democratic	January 3, 1887 – January 7, 1889	Napa, Yolo	
Frank S. Sprague	Republican	January 7, 1889 – January 2, 1893	Napa, Yolo	
J. B. Hoyt	Republican	January 2, 1893 – January 4, 1897	Solano	
John J. Luchsinger	Republican	January 4, 1897 – January 2, 1905	Solano	
Charles Mortimer Belshaw	Republican	January 2, 1905 – January 4, 1909	Contra Costa, Marin	
Ennio Batista Martinelli	Republican	January 4, 1909 – January 6, 1913	Contra Costa, Marin	
James Curtis Owens	Democratic	January 6, 1913 – January 8, 1917	Contra Costa, Marin	
William R. Sharkey	Republican	January 8, 1917 – January 2, 1933	Contra Costa, Marin	
Andrew L. Pierovich	Democratic	January 2, 1933 – January 6, 1941	Alpine, Amador, El Dorado	
Harley E. Dillinger	Democratic	January 6, 1941 – January 5, 1953	Alpine, Amador, El Dorado	
Swift Berry	Republican	January 5, 1953 – January 2, 1961	Amador, El Dorado	
John C. Begovich	Democratic	January 2, 1961 – January 2, 1967	Amador, El Dorado	
J. Eugene McAteer	Democratic	January 2, 1967 – May 26, 1967	San Francisco	Died in office. Died from a heart attack while playing handball at the Olympic Club.
Vacant		May 26, 1967 – September 4, 1967	San Francisco	
Milton Marks	Republican	September 4, 1967 – November 30, 1976	San Francisco	Sworn in after winning special election.
Nicholas C. Petris	Democratic	December 6, 1976 – November 30, 1996	Alameda	
Nicholas C. Petris	Democratic	December 6, 1976 – November 30, 1996	Alameda, Contra Costa	
Barbara Lee	Democratic	December 2, 1996 – April 17, 1998	Alameda, Contra Costa	Resigned to become a member of Congress for the 9th Congressional district.
Vacant		April 17, 1998 – December 7, 1998	Alameda, Contra Costa	
Don Perata	Democratic	December 7, 1998 – November 30, 2008	Alameda, Contra Costa	
Loni Hancock	Democratic	December 1, 2008 – November 30, 2016	Alameda, Contra Costa	
Nancy Skinner	Democratic	December 5, 2016 – November 30, 2024	Alameda, Contra Costa	Elected in 2016. Re-elected in 2020; Term-limited and redistricted to the 7th district in 2024.
Tim Grayson	Democratic	December 5, 2024 – present	Alameda, Contra Costa	Elected in 2024.

== Election results (1990-present) ==
=== 2024 ===
2024 California State Senate 9th district election
Primary election
Party	Candidate	Votes	%
Democratic	Tim Grayson	103,121	59.3
Democratic	Marisol Rubio	70,043	40.2
Republican	David Minor (write-in)	410	0.2
Republican	Joseph Grcar (write-in)	398	0.2
Total votes		173,972	100.0
General election
Democratic	Tim Grayson	193,558	52.0
Democratic	Marisol Rubio	178,776	48.0
Total votes		372,334	100.0
Democratic hold			

=== 2020 ===
2020 California State Senate 9th district election
Primary election
Party	Candidate	Votes	%
Democratic	Nancy Skinner (incumbent)	263,751	100.0
Libertarian	Jamie Dluzak (write-in)	126	0.0
Total votes		263,877	100.0
General election
Democratic	Nancy Skinner	404,455	84.4
Libertarian	Jamie Dluzak	53,256	11.6
Total votes		457,711	100.0
Democratic hold			

=== 2016 ===
2016 California State Senate 9th district election
Primary election
Party	Candidate	Votes	%
Democratic	Nancy Skinner	116,710	47.8
Democratic	Sandré Swanson	74,365	30.5
Democratic	Katherine Grace Welch	32,698	13.4
Republican	Rich Kinney	20,287	8.3
Total votes		244,060	100.0
General election
Democratic	Nancy Skinner	236,133	62.2
Democratic	Sandré Swanson	143,573	37.8
Total votes		379,706	100.0
Democratic hold			

=== 2012 ===
2012 California State Senate 9th district election
Primary election
Party	Candidate	Votes	%
Democratic	Loni Hancock (incumbent)	123,624	99.3
Peace and Freedom	Mary Catherine McIlroy (write-in)	785	0.6
Libertarian	Lisa D. Ringer (write-in)	92	0.1
Total votes		124,501	100.0
General election
Democratic	Loni Hancock (incumbent)	300,994	85.8
Peace and Freedom	Mary Catherine McIlroy	49,987	14.2
Total votes		350,981	100.0
Democratic hold			

=== 2008 ===
2008 California State Senate 9th district election
Party	Candidate	Votes	%
Democratic	Loni Hancock	272,225	77.2
Republican	Claudia Bermudez	53,299	15.1
Peace and Freedom	Marsha Feinland	26,996	7.7
Total votes		352,520	100.00
Democratic hold			

=== 2004 ===
2004 California State Senate 9th district election
Party	Candidate	Votes	%
Democratic	Don Perata (incumbent)	248,614	77.1
Republican	Patricia Deutsche	50,110	15.6
Peace and Freedom	Tom Condit	17,412	5.4
Libertarian	Peter Von Pinnon	6,383	1.9
Total votes		322,519	100.0
Democratic hold			

=== 2000 ===
2000 California State Senate 9th district election
Party	Candidate	Votes	%
Democratic	Don Perata (incumbent)	218,550	83.4
Republican	Linda J. Marshall	30,062	11.5
Libertarian	Peter Von Pinnon	13,622	5.1
Total votes		262,234	100.0
Democratic hold			

=== 1998 (special) ===
1998 California State Senate 9th district special election Vacancy resulting from the resignation of Barbara Lee
Party	Candidate	Votes	%
Democratic	Don Perata	164,476	77.2
Republican	Deborah Wright	34,461	16.2
Peace and Freedom	Marsha Feinland	14,250	6.7
Total votes		213,187	100.0
Democratic hold			

=== 1996 ===
1996 California State Senate 9th district election
Party	Candidate	Votes	%
Democratic	Barbara Lee	196,430	78.2
Republican	Thomas N. Hudson	37,341	14.9
Peace and Freedom	Robert J. Evans	8,870	3.5
Natural Law	Carol Flyer Prettie	8,465	3.4
Total votes		251,106	100.0
Democratic hold			

=== 1992 ===
1992 California State Senate 9th district election
Party	Candidate	Votes	%
Democratic	Nicholas C. Petris	227,930	84.6
Peace and Freedom	David Campbell	41,555	15.4
Total votes		269,485	100.0
Democratic hold			

== See also ==
- California State Senate
- California State Senate districts
- Districts in California
