= Electoral history of Barbara Boxer =

Elections featuring American politician

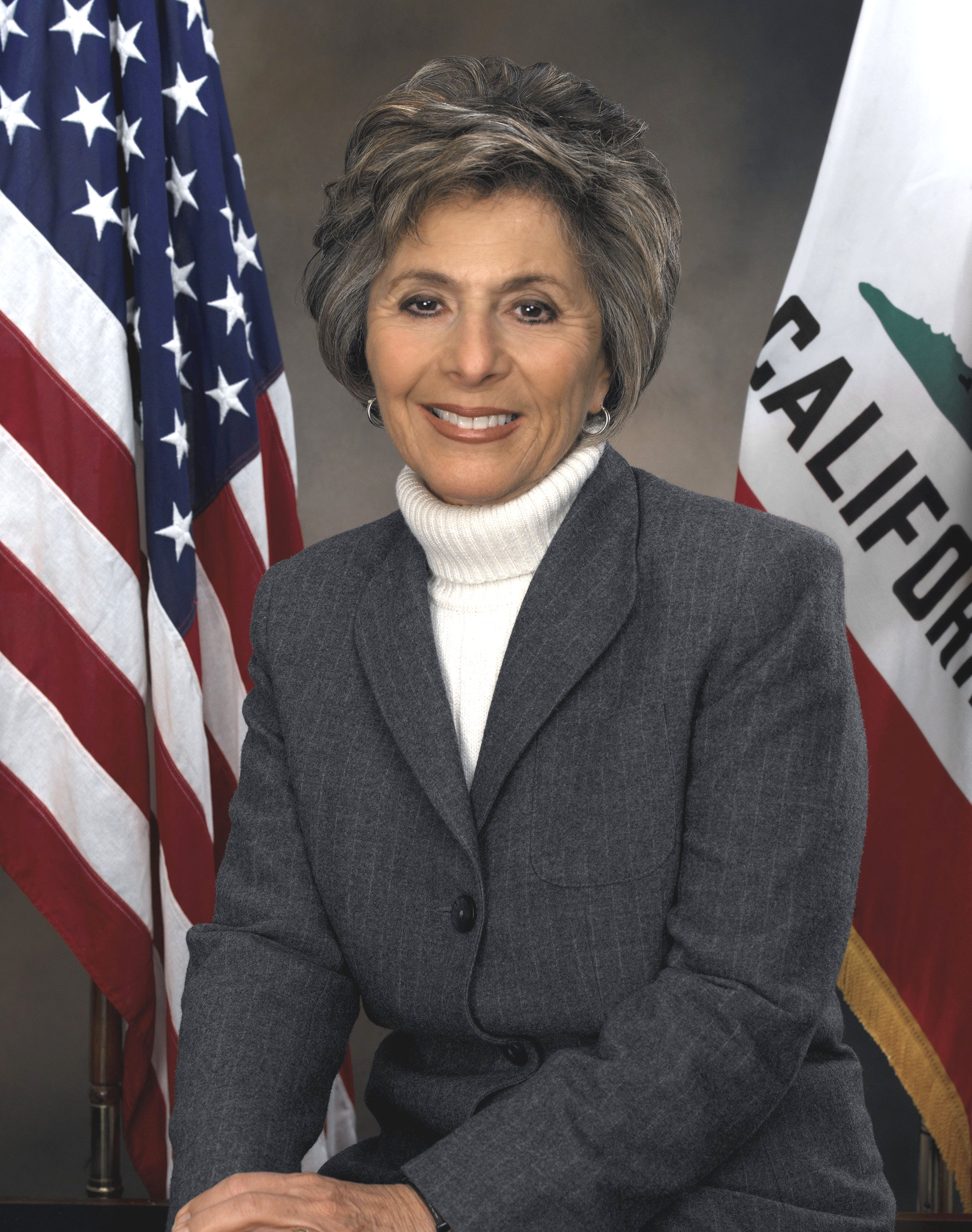
Senator Barbara Boxer (2005)

Electoral history of Barbara Boxer.

== House of Representatives races (1982–1990) ==
=== 1982 ===
United States House of Representatives elections in California, 1982
Party	Candidate	Votes	%
Democratic	Barbara Boxer	96,379	52.3
Republican	Dennis McQuaid	82,128	44.6
Libertarian	Howard C. Creighton	3,191	1.7
Peace and Freedom	Timothy Allen Albertson	2,366	1.3
Total votes		184,064	100.0
Democratic hold			

=== 1984 ===
United States House of Representatives elections in California, 1984
Party	Candidate	Votes	%
Democratic	Barbara Boxer (incumbent)	162,511	67.9
Republican	Douglas Binderup	71,011	29.7
Libertarian	Howard C. Creighton	5,574	2.3
Total votes		239,096	100.0
Democratic hold			

=== 1986 ===
United States House of Representatives elections in California, 1986
Party	Candidate	Votes	%
Democratic	Barbara Boxer (incumbent)	142,946	73.8
Republican	Franklin Ernst III	50,606	26.1
Total votes		193,552	100.0
Democratic hold			

=== 1988 ===
United States House of Representatives elections in California, 1988
Party	Candidate	Votes	%
Democratic	Barbara Boxer (incumbent)	176,645	73.3
Republican	William Steinmetz	64,174	26.6
Total votes		240,819	100.0
Democratic hold			

=== 1990 ===
United States House of Representatives elections in California, 1990
Party	Candidate	Votes	%
Democratic	Barbara Boxer (incumbent)	137,306	68.1
Republican	Bill Boerum	64,402	31.9
Total votes		201,708	100.0
Democratic hold			

== U.S. Senate races (1992–2010) ==
=== 1992 ===
United States Senate Democratic primary election in California, 1992
Party	Candidate	Votes	%	+%
Democratic	Barbara Boxer	1,339,126	43.6	
Democratic	Leo McCarthy	943,229	30.7	
Democratic	Mel Levine	667,359	21.7	
Democratic	Charles Greene	122,954	4.0	

United States Senate election in California, 1992
Party	Candidate	Votes	%	±%
Democratic	Barbara Boxer	5,173,467	47.9	
Republican	Bruce Herschensohn	4,644,182	43.0	
American Independent	Jerome McCready	373,051	3.5	
Peace and Freedom	Genevieve Torres	372,817	3.5	
Libertarian	June R. Genis	235,919	2.2	
Total votes		10,799,436		
Majority		529,285	4.9	
Turnout				
Democratic hold		Swing		

=== 1998 ===
United States Senate Democratic primary election in California, 1998
Party	Candidate	Votes	%	+%
Democratic	Barbara Boxer (incumbent)	2,574,264	92.2	
Democratic	John Pinkerton	219,250	7.9	

United States Senate election in California, 1998
Party	Candidate	Votes	%	±%
Democratic	Barbara Boxer (incumbent)	4,410,056	53.1	+5.2
Republican	Matt Fong	3,575,078	43.0	0.0
Libertarian	Ted Brown	93,926	1.1	−1.1
Reform	Timothy R. Erich	82,918	1.0	+1.0
American Independent	H. Joseph Perrin, Sr.	54,699	0.7	−2.8
Peace and Freedom	Ophie C. Beltran	48,685	0.6	−2.9
Natural Law	Brian M. Rees	46,543	0.6	+0.6
Total votes		8,311,905		
Majority		834,978	10.1	+5.2
Turnout				
Democratic hold		Swing	+5.2	

=== 2004 ===
United States Senate election in California, 2004
Party	Candidate	Votes	%	±%
Democratic	Barbara Boxer (incumbent)	6,955,728	57.7	+4.6
Republican	Bill Jones	4,555,922	37.8	−5.2
Peace and Freedom	Marsha Feinland	243,846	2.0	+1.4
Libertarian	James P. Gray	216,522	1.8	+0.7
American Independent	Don J. Grundmann	81,224	0.7	0.0
Total votes		12,053,242		
Majority		2,399,806	19.9	+9.8
Turnout				
Democratic hold		Swing	+9.8	

=== 2010 ===
United States Senate Democratic primary election in California, 2010
Party	Candidate	Votes	%	+%
Democratic	Barbara Boxer (incumbent)	1,957,920	81.0	
Democratic	Brian Quintana	338,442	13.9	
Democratic	Robert "Mickey" Kaus	123,573	5.1	

United States Senate election in California, 2010
Party	Candidate	Votes	%	±%
Democratic	Barbara Boxer (incumbent)	5,205,852	52.2	−5.5
Republican	Carly Fiorina	4,205,160	42.2	+4.4
Libertarian	Gail Lightfoot	174,537	1.8	0.0
Peace and Freedom	Marsha Feinland	134,634	1.4	−0.6
Green	Duane Roberts	127,768	1.2	+1.2
American Independent	Edward C. Noonan	125,075	1.2	+0.5
Total votes		9,973,026		
Majority		1,000,692	10.0	−9.9
Turnout				
Democratic hold		Swing	-9.9	
