= Shirley Dean =

American politician

20th Mayor of Berkeley
- In office December 1994 – November 2002
- Preceded by: Loni Hancock
- Succeeded by: Tom Bates

Personal details
- Born: Shirley Ann Bryant Eaton, Colorado, U.S.
- Party: Democratic

Shirley Ann Dean (née Bryant; born 1935-36), considered moderate in Berkeley politics, is an American politician who served as the Mayor of Berkeley, California (1994-2002). Before serving two terms as Berkeley's Mayor, Dean served on the Berkeley City Council for 15 years (1975–94) and was a leader of the Berkeley Democratic Club.

Shirley Dean grew up in a single parent family and graduated from Berkeley High School (1952). She was selected as a Distinguished Graduate in the Berkeley High School Hall of Fame and was the first in her family to attend college. She graduated with honors from UC Berkeley with a BA in Social Welfare in 1956.

During part of the time she served as Mayor, she worked half-time for UC Berkeley Undergraduate Admission and Relations with Schools and the Office of Admissions. Her responsibilities included writing the plan and supervising field work for the recruitment of minority students to the UC Berkeley campus and visiting high schools throughout California. She received two Distinguished Service Awards from UC Berkeley for her work before she retired in March 2000.

== Mayor ==
Shirley Dean was first elected Mayor of Berkeley in 1994 after a close run-off race. Dean actually trailed in the November 1994 general election, with fellow council member Don Jelinek capturing 49.2% of the vote against Dean’s 45.5%. Under city law, that forced a runoff in December, which Dean won due to lower turnout in the college town.

She was re-elected by more than 56% of the vote in 1998. A month before her 1998 victory, her opponent, Don Jelinek, accused her of disguising her identity while visiting Wilmington College, the college attended by rival Council member and Jelinek supporter Kriss Worthington. Dean stated that she visited the school to read about Worthington in the college newspaper, a public record. She also stated she did not ask for non-public records and that upon the request of the college showed her California Driver License bearing her full name and address. There is no record that she used any material from the college newspaper.

During most of her two-term tenure as Mayor, she worked with divided City Council that had a 5-4 progressive majority. The position of mayor in the city of Berkeley is largely a symbolic post, carrying no more power than other council members. Dean compensated by working relentlessly on programs she thought were best for the city. For much of her career, Dean's political base was the very active network of Berkeley neighborhood organizations; however, many of her critics and rivals found her to be too conservative. Dean and other members of the City Council were openly mocked at a city-sponsored art festival where a satirical mock City Council meeting was staged in which actors took over the Council Chambers and ridiculed Berkeley's elected officials.

After September 11, when the progressive City Council majority voted to condemn the war in Afghanistan, Dean went on Fox News and reported that the Council’s actions were prompting a flood of letters and e-mails threatening an economic boycott of the City. On a television show regarding the issue, she called her Council colleagues who had voted for the measure “patriots” who had every right to protest.

Dean lost her bid for re-election in 2002 to fellow Democrat Tom Bates. The day before the election Tom Bates stole 1,000 copies of The Daily Californian because the paper had endorsed Dean. Bates was charged with the theft, pleaded guilty, was fined, and ordered to pay the paper restitution. Dean ran for Mayor against Bates once more in 2008, but was soundly defeated.

Dean's accomplishments as Mayor include:

- Recognition for bringing the Arts and Theater District to life in Downtown Berkeley by establishing a public-private partnership with the Tony Award-winning Berkeley Repertory Theatre and bringing in the JazzSchool, Aurora Theater, and Nevo Center for the Performing Arts in one of Berkeley’s oldest buildings. The Arts and Theater District was showcased by the United States Conference of Mayors as an example of revitalization of a declining downtown area. It is estimated that over a 5-year period the city's original investment of $5.5 million on Arts District projects generated over $150 million in public and private spending in the downtown area.
- Putting together the funding to build the Berkeley I-80 bridge a bicycle and pedestrian overpass that spans the multi-lane I-80 Freeway providing safe passage from the city to the Eastshore State Park and the Berkeley Marina.
- Development of a plan for City-sponsored housing assistance for people with AIDS to remain in their own homes based on the input of a task force she formed that included members of the AIDS community. The unanimously approved plan served as the precursor to the city obtaining federally sponsored supportive housing.
- Working to restore the landmark Marin Circle Fountain with private funds. The fountain is the largest public works gift ever given to the city of Berkeley.
- Working in partnership with Country Joe McDonald to honor veterans by bringing the “Wall that Heals”, a Vietnam War memorial, to Berkeley in honor of those who served, died and protested that war.
- Establish programs expanding and renovating the city's library, constructing 800 new housing units including the Gaia Building downtown, and lowering crime.
- As Chair of the East Bay Public Safety Corridor, leading the East Bay regional effort to ban the sale of Saturday Night Specials, enact trigger lock ordinances, and impose special taxes on retailers who sell guns. This work was recognized by the United States Department of Justice and Attorney General Janet Reno as exemplary. She also secured private contributions to purchase an outdoor sculpture, “The Berkeley Peace Bell”, made from melted guns.

== Early political career ==
Dean started her political career by organizing the Bonita-Berryman Neighborhood Association, which led to her appointment in 1971 to the city's Planning Commission. In the early 70s, she worked with Urban Care to stop the development of a large shopping center on the waterfront. She also worked with Urban Care to achieve Council approval for what is recognized as one of the best Landmarks Preservation Ordinances in the Nation. In 1976, she was elected from a caucus in her congressional district as a delegate to the Democratic National Convention in New York City pledged to Senator Frank Church.

Dean served on the Berkeley City Council for 15 years between 1975 and 1994. She was first elected to the City Council in 1975 as an at large member, she served on the council until 1982. When district elections were adopted in Berkeley in 1986 Dean was the first elected council member from District 5, she held the seat until 1994 when she was elected Mayor.

== Recent Community Involvement ==
Since leaving the Mayor’s Office in 2002, Dean has been involved in several community and environmental organizations, serving on the boards of:

- Save Strawberry Canyon, an organization working to preserve the watershed and woodlands of Strawberry Canyon from proposed construction by Lawrence Berkeley National Laboratory.
- A Better Way, an East Bay social service and mental health agency that serves children and their families.
- Citizens for East Shore Parks (CESP), working to extend the waterfront park through Point Molate in Richmond, California.

In 2003, Dean was named Woman of the year by the Zonta Club of Berkeley/North Bay. In 2009, Dean appeared in the documentary film Power Trip: Theatrically Berkeley about the controversial greening of Berkeley after the passage of Berkeley Proposition G. Dean made headlines in 2007 when she, at age 71, city council member Betty Olds, 86, and noted environmentalist and co-founder of Save the Bay, Sylvia McLaughlin, 90, climbed a ladder to briefly join a tree-sit aimed at saving the Memorial Oak Grove outside the stadium of the University of California, Berkeley. After a 21-month protest, the oak trees were cut down.

== Offices Held ==
Political offices
Preceded by NA	Berkeley City Council Member; 1975–1982	Succeeded by NA
Preceded by NA	Berkeley City Council Member, District 5; 1986–1994	Succeeded by Diane Bauer
Preceded by Loni Hancock	Mayor of Berkeley, California; 1994–2002	Succeeded by Tom Bates
