= California's 9th district =

California's 9th district may refer to:

- California's 9th congressional district
- California's 9th State Assembly district
- California's 9th State Senate district
