= California's 14th district =

California's 14th district may refer to:

- California's 14th congressional district
- California's 14th State Assembly district
- California's 14th State Senate district
