= Power Trip: Theatrically Berkeley =

Power Trip: Theatrically Berkeley (2009) is a documentary film directed by Emio Tomeoni and produced by Meo Productions.

The film concerns Berkeley, California's attempt to green the city—partly by passing Measure G in Berkeley in 2007—and the various factions in the city arguing over the best way to achieve this. The film features mayor of Berkeley Tom Bates, former mayors Shirley Dean and Loni Hancock, and Berkeley City Council member Kriss Worthington.

The film had its premiere on September 14, 2009 at Pacific Film Archive at UC Berkeley.
