= California's 14th State Assembly district =

American legislative district

Current assemblymember
Buffy Wicks; D–Oakland
- Population (2020): 475,705
- Demographics: 39.40% White; 10.99% Black; 26.68% Latino; 19.81% Asian; 0.19% Native American; 0.34% Hawaiian/Pacific Islander; 0.96% other; 6.2% remainder of multiracial
- Registered voters: 283,248
- Registration: 53.43% Democratic; 17.9% Republican; 23.15% No party preference

California's 14th State Assembly district is one of 80 California State Assembly districts. It is currently represented by Democrat Buffy Wicks of Oakland.

== District profile ==
The district is located in the East Bay, on the southern shore of the Carquinez Strait, spanning from Rodeo to Piedmont, in Contra Costa County and Alameda County.

Alameda County – (12.11%)

- Albany
- Berkeley
- Oakland – (10.85%)
- Piedmont

Contra Costa County – (23.27%)

- El Cerrito
- Hercules
- Pinole
- Richmond
- San Pablo

== Election results from statewide races ==
Year	Office	Results
2022	Senator	Padilla 89.2 – 10.8%
2022	Governor	Newsom 85.5 – 11.5%
2021	Recall	No 90.3 – 9.7%
2020	President	Biden 89.0 – 9.0%
2018	Governor	Newsom 89.6 – 10.4%
2018	Senator	Feinstein 60.5 – 39.5%
2016	President	Clinton 87.4 – 7.0%
2016	Senator	Harris 79.5 – 20.5%
2014	Governor	Brown 90.8 – 9.2%
2012	President	Obama 86.8 – 9.6%
2012	Senator	Feinstein 90.5 – 9.5%

== List of assembly members representing the district ==
Due to redistricting, the 14th district has been moved around different parts of the state. The current iteration resulted from the 2021 redistricting by the California Citizens Redistricting Commission.

Assembly members	Party	Years served	Counties represented	Notes
Austin Walrath	Republican	January 5, 1885 – January 3, 1887	Nevada	
Josiah Sims	Republican	January 3, 1887 – January 5, 1891	Nevada	
Michael Garver	Democratic	January 5, 1891 – January 2, 1893	Nevada	
Robert S. Raw	Republican	January 2, 1893 – January 7, 1895	El Dorado	
Charles A. Swisler	Republican	January 7, 1895 – January 4, 1897	El Dorado	
George Burnham	Republican	January 4, 1897 – January 2, 1899	El Dorado	
Robert S. Raw	Republican	January 2, 1899 – January 1, 1901	El Dorado	
S. W. Irving	Democratic	January 1, 1901 – January 5, 1903	El Dorado	
Charles O. Dunbar	Democratic	January 5, 1903 – January 2, 1905	Sonoma	
H. L. Tripp	Republican	January 2, 1905 – April 26, 1906	Sonoma	Resigned from office, 8 days after the 1906 San Francisco earthquake.
Vacant		April 26, 1906 – January 7, 1907	Sonoma	
Henry W. A. Weske	Republican	January 7, 1907 – January 4, 1909	Sonoma	
Louis W. Juilliard	Democratic	January 4, 1909 – January 2, 1911	Sonoma	
Herbert W. Slater	Democratic	January 2, 1911 – January 6, 1913	Sonoma	
J. M. Inman	Republican	January 6, 1913 – January 4, 1915	Sacramento	
Walter W. Chenoweth	Republican	January 4, 1915 – January 8, 1917	Sacramento	
John W. Johnston	Republican	January 8, 1917 – January 5, 1925	Sacramento	
Roy J. Nielsen	Republican	January 5, 1925 – January 5, 1931	Sacramento	
Frank S. Israel	Republican	January 5, 1931 – September 26, 1932	San Joaquin	Died in office after falling from a haysack.
Vacant		September 26, 1932 – January 2, 1933	San Joaquin	
William F. Knowland	Republican	January 2, 1933 – January 7, 1935	Alameda	
Charles J. Wagner	Democratic	January 7, 1935 – January 4, 1937	Alameda	
George P. Miller	Democratic	January 4, 1937 – January 6, 1941	Alameda	
Randal F. Dickey	Republican	January 6, 1941 – January 7, 1957	Alameda	
Robert W. Crown	Democratic	January 7, 1957 – May 21, 1973	Alameda	Died in office.
Vacant		May 21, 1973 – September 10, 1973	Alameda	
Bill Lockyer	Democratic	September 10, 1973 – November 30, 1982	Alameda	Sworn in after he won the special election.
Johan Klehs	Democratic	December 6, 1982 – November 30, 1992	Alameda	
Tom Bates	Democratic	December 7, 1992 – November 30, 1996	Alameda, Contra Costa	
Dion Aroner	Democratic	December 6, 1996 – November 30, 2002	Alameda, Contra Costa	
Loni Hancock	Democratic	December 2, 2002 – November 30, 2008	Alameda, Contra Costa	
Nancy Skinner	Democratic	December 1, 2008 – November 30, 2012	Alameda, Contra Costa	Redistricted to the 15th district
Susan Bonilla	Democratic	December 3, 2012 – November 30, 2016	Contra Costa, Solano	Redistricted from the 11th district
Tim Grayson	Democratic	December 5, 2016 – November 30, 2022	Contra Costa, Solano	Redistricted to the 15th district
Buffy Wicks	Democratic	December 5, 2022 – present	Alameda, Contra Costa	Redistricted from the 15th district

== Election results (1990–present) ==
=== 2024 ===
2024 California State Assembly 14th district election
Primary election
Party	Candidate	Votes	%
Democratic	Buffy Wicks (incumbent)	78,750	73.5
Democratic	Margot Smith	18,272	17.1
Republican	Utkarsh Jain	10,075	9.4
Total votes		107,097	100.0
General election
Democratic	Buffy Wicks (incumbent)	124,973	68.5
Democratic	Margot Smith	57,450	31.5
Total votes		182,423	100.0
Democratic hold			

=== 2022 ===
2022 California State Assembly 14th district election
Primary election
Party	Candidate	Votes	%
Democratic	Buffy Wicks	85,180	100.0
Republican	Rich Kinney (write-in)	37	0.0
Total votes		85,217	100.0
General election
Democratic	Buffy Wicks	139,331	88.4
Republican	Rich Kinney	18,242	11.6
Total votes		240,840	100.0
Democratic hold			

=== 2020 ===
2020 California State Assembly 14th district election
Primary election
Party	Candidate	Votes	%
Democratic	Tim Grayson (incumbent)	82,052	66.4
Republican	Janell Elizabeth Proctor	31,477	25.5
Peace and Freedom	Cassandra Devereaux	10,107	8.2
Total votes		123,636	100.0
General election
Democratic	Tim Grayson (incumbent)	163,205	70.3
Republican	Janell Elizabeth Proctor	68,819	29.7
Total votes		232,024	100.0
Democratic hold			

=== 2018 ===
2018 California State Assembly 14th district election
Primary election
Party	Candidate	Votes	%
Democratic	Tim Grayson (incumbent)	67,272	83.6
Democratic	Aasim Yahya	13,231	16.4
Total votes		80,503	100.0
General election
Democratic	Tim Grayson (incumbent)	109,108	71.6
Democratic	Aasim Yahya	43,292	28.4
Total votes		152,400	100.0
Democratic hold			

=== 2016 ===
2016 California State Assembly 14th district election
Primary election
Party	Candidate	Votes	%
Democratic	Mae Torlakson	34,535	32.3
Democratic	Tim Grayson	33,712	31.6
Republican	Debora Allen	27,826	26.1
Democratic	Harmesh Kumar	10,694	10.0
Total votes		106,767	100.0
General election
Democratic	Tim Grayson	107,653	61.5
Democratic	Mae Torlakson	67,300	38.5
Total votes		174,953	100.0
Democratic hold			

=== 2014 ===
2014 California State Assembly 14th district election
Primary election
Party	Candidate	Votes	%
Democratic	Susan Bonilla (incumbent)	44,644	99.1
Republican	Joy D. Delepine (write-in)	366	0.8
No party preference	John Henry Kimack (write-in)	24	0.1
Total votes		45,034	100.0
General election
Democratic	Susan Bonilla (incumbent)	69,325	68.9
Republican	Joy D. Delepine	31,298	31.1
Total votes		100,623	100.0
Democratic hold			

=== 2012 ===
2012 California State Assembly 14th district election
Primary election
Party	Candidate	Votes	%
Democratic	Susan Bonilla (incumbent)	54,832	100.0
Total votes		54,832	100.0
General election
Democratic	Susan Bonilla (incumbent)	135,834	100.0
Total votes		135,834	100.0
Democratic hold			

=== 2010 ===
2010 California State Assembly 14th district election
Party	Candidate	Votes	%
Democratic	Nancy Skinner (incumbent)	127,940	82.1
Republican	Ryan Hatcher	28,055	17.9
Total votes		155,995	100.0
Democratic hold			

=== 2008 ===
2008 California State Assembly 14th district election
Party	Candidate	Votes	%
Democratic	Nancy Skinner	162,432	100.0
Total votes		162,432	100.0
Democratic hold			

=== 2006 ===
2006 California State Assembly 14th district election
Party	Candidate	Votes	%
Democratic	Loni Hancock (incumbent)	116,879	81.7
Republican	Leigh Wolf	26,140	18.3
Total votes		143,019	100.0
Democratic hold			

=== 2004 ===
2004 California State Assembly 14th district election
Party	Candidate	Votes	%
Democratic	Loni Hancock (incumbent)	141,184	77.4
Republican	Lance Montauk	32,531	17.8
Libertarian	Kevin O'Neal	8,632	4.7
Total votes		182,347	100.0
Democratic hold			

=== 2002 ===
2002 California State Assembly 14th district election
Party	Candidate	Votes	%
Democratic	Loni Hancock	102,373	100.0
Total votes		102,373	100.0
Democratic hold			

=== 2000 ===
2000 California State Assembly 14th district election
Party	Candidate	Votes	%
Democratic	Dion Aroner (incumbent)	123,968	83.9
Republican	Jerald Udinsky	16,366	11.1
Libertarian	Daniel C. Burton	7,383	5.0
Total votes		147,717	100.0
Democratic hold			

=== 1998 ===
1998 California State Assembly 14th district election
Party	Candidate	Votes	%
Democratic	Dion Aroner (incumbent)	103,726	87.2
Republican	Jerald Udinsky	15,287	12.8
Total votes		119,013	100.0
Democratic hold			

=== 1996 ===
1996 California State Assembly 14th district election
Party	Candidate	Votes	%
Democratic	Dion Aroner	90,539	66.3
Republican	William Muir	29,121	21.3
Green	Hank Chapot	12,851	9.4
Natural Law	Viola Boeson	4,091	3.0
Total votes		136,602	100.0
Democratic hold			

=== 1994 ===
1994 California State Assembly 14th district election
Party	Candidate	Votes	%
Democratic	Tom Bates (incumbent)	97,999	78.5
Republican	David V. Anderson	19,130	15.3
Green	Hank Chapot, Jr.	7,712	6.2
Total votes		124,841	100.0
Democratic hold			

=== 1992 ===
1992 California State Assembly 14th district election
Party	Candidate	Votes	%
Democratic	Tom Bates (incumbent)	126,317	82.1
Peace and Freedom	Marsha Feinland	27,468	17.9
Total votes		153,785	100.0
Democratic hold			

=== 1990 ===
1990 California State Assembly 14th district election
Party	Candidate	Votes	%
Democratic	Johan Klehs (incumbent)	56,022	65.8
Republican	Don J. Grundmann	22,593	26.6
Libertarian	Wayne R. Nguyen	6,473	7.6
Total votes		85,088	100.0
Democratic hold			

== See also ==
- California State Assembly
- California State Assembly districts
- Districts in California
