= Dion Aroner =

American politician

Member of the California State Assembly from the 14th district
- In office December 6, 1996 – November 30, 2002
- Preceded by: Tom Bates
- Succeeded by: Loni Hancock

Personal details
- Born: June 6, 1945 (age 81) San Francisco, California
- Party: Democratic
- Spouse: David

Dion Louise Aroner (born June 6, 1945) is a Democrat who represented California's 14th Assembly District, including parts of Alameda and Contra Costa counties, from December 6, 1996, to November 30, 2002. She also lost in a special election primary to Don Perata for the 9th District Senate seat in 1998. She currently owns her own lobbying firm with two of her former staffers. Since leaving the Assembly, Aroner has also been part of the legislator-in-residence program at the University of California, Berkeley. Prior to serving in the Assembly, Aroner served as the Chief of Staff to her predecessor Tom Bates from 1972 until 1996. Bates is also the husband of Aroner's successor, Loni Hancock.

Currently, Dion Aroner works as a public relations consultant for businesses and organizations that are interested in purchasing access to government officials, lobbying, and other legislative and policy influencing strategies.

California Assembly
Preceded by Tom Bates	California State Assemblymember, 14th District; 1996–2002	Succeeded by Loni Hancock
Party political offices
Preceded by	State Assembly Democratic Caucus Chairwoman; 2000–2002	Succeeded by
