= Tim Grayson =

American politician (born 1967)

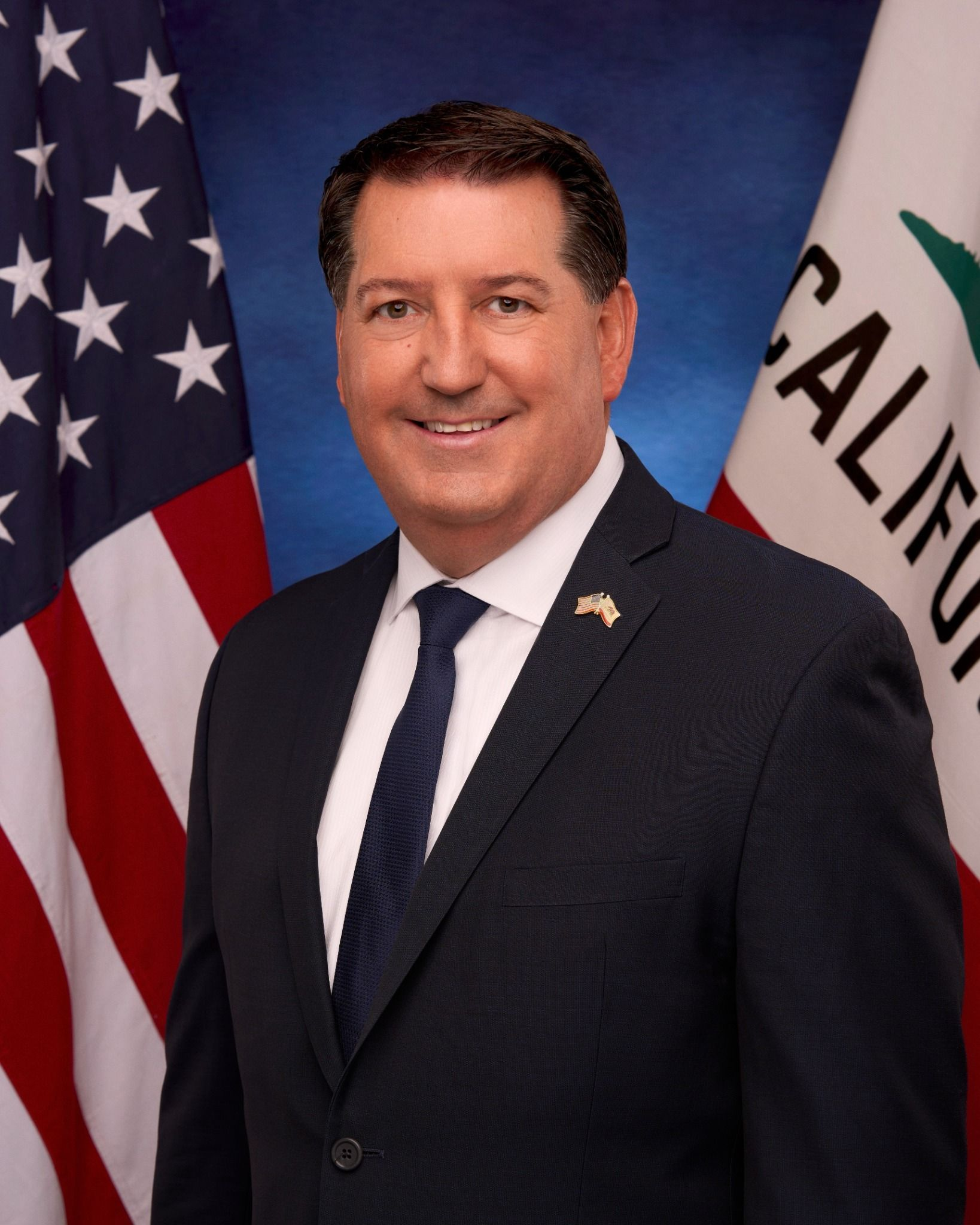
- Official portrait, 2024

Member of the California State Senate from the 9th district
- Incumbent
- Assumed office December 2, 2024
- Preceded by: Steve Glazer (redistricting)

Member of the California Assembly
- In office December 5, 2016 – November 30, 2024
- Preceded by: Susan Bonilla
- Succeeded by: Anamarie Avila Farias
- Constituency: 14th district (2016–2022); 15th district (2022–2024)

Personal details
- Born: Timothy S. Grayson; September 17, 1967 (age 58)
- Party: Democratic (since 2016); Republican (before 2016)
- Spouse: Tammy Isaacs
- Children: 2

Tim Grayson (born September 17, 1967) is an American state politician in California. He serves in the California State Senate since 2024, and previously served in the California State Assembly from 2016 to 2024.

== Early career ==
Grayson was a construction contractor before getting involved in politics.

== Political career ==
Grayson was a member of the Concord City Council before successfully running for the California State Assembly in November 2016. Although once a Republican, he switched parties upon making a bid for Assembly.

Grayson represented the 14th Assembly District from 2016 to 2022, and the 15th Assembly District - which encompasses parts of the East Bay and the North Bay, including Concord, Pittsburg, and Pleasant Hill - from 2022 to 2024.

He ran for the California State Senate in the November 2024 election, contesting and winning the senate seat representing the 9th District seat.

== Electoral history ==
2016 California State Assembly 14th district election
Primary election
Party	Candidate	Votes	%
Democratic	Mae Torlakson	34,535	32.3
Democratic	Tim Grayson	33,712	31.6
Republican	Debora Allen	27,826	26.1
Democratic	Harmesh Kumar	10,694	10.0
Total votes		106,767	100.0
General election
Democratic	Tim Grayson	107,653	61.5
Democratic	Mae Torlakson	67,300	38.5
Total votes		174,953	100.0
Democratic hold			

2018 California State Assembly 14th district election
Primary election
Party	Candidate	Votes	%
Democratic	Tim Grayson (incumbent)	67,272	83.6
Democratic	Aasim Yahya	13,231	16.4
Total votes		80,473	100.0
General election
Democratic	Tim Grayson (incumbent)	109,108	71.6
Democratic	Aasim Yahya	43,292	28.4
Total votes		152,400	100.0
Democratic hold			

2020 California State Assembly 14th district election
Primary election
Party	Candidate	Votes	%
Democratic	Tim Grayson (incumbent)	82,052	66.4
Republican	Janell Elizabeth Proctor	31,477	25.5
Peace and Freedom	Cassandra Devereaux	10,107	8.2
Total votes		123,636	100.0
General election
Democratic	Tim Grayson (incumbent)	163,205	70.3
Republican	Janell Elizabeth Proctor	68,819	29.7
Total votes		232,024	100.0
Democratic hold			

2022 California State Assembly 15th district election
Primary election
Party	Candidate	Votes	%
Democratic	Tim Grayson (incumbent)	61,742	68.4
Republican	Janell Elizabeth Proctor	28,501	31.6
Total votes		90,243	100.0
General election
Democratic	Tim Grayson (incumbent)	100,712	67.3
Republican	Janell Elizabeth Proctor	48,911	32.7
Total votes		149,623	100.0
Democratic hold			

2024 California State Senate 9th district election
Primary election
Party	Candidate	Votes	%
Democratic	Tim Grayson	103,121	59.3
Democratic	Marisol Rubio	70,043	40.3
Republican	David Minor (write-in)	410	0.2
Republican	Joseph Grcar (write-in)	398	0.2
Total votes		173,972	100.0
General election
Democratic	Tim Grayson	193,558	52.0
Democratic	Marisol Rubio	178,776	48.0
Total votes		372,334	100.0
Democratic hold			
