= The Daily Californian =

Student-run newspaper in Berkeley, California

- Feb. 3, 2017 issue
- Type: Student newspaper
- Format: Broadsheet
- Owner(s): Independent Berkeley Students Publishing Company, Inc.
- Editor-in-chief: Swasti Singhai
- Managing editor: Elise Fisher
- Staff writers: 401
- Founded: 1871; 155 years ago
- Language: English
- Headquarters: 2483 Hearst Avenue; Berkeley, California
- Country: United States
- Circulation: 10,000 (M/Tu/Th/F)
- ISSN: 1050-2300
- Website: dailycal.org

The Daily Californian (Daily Cal) is an independent, student-run newspaper that serves the University of California, Berkeley, campus and its surrounding community.

== History ==
=== 20th century ===
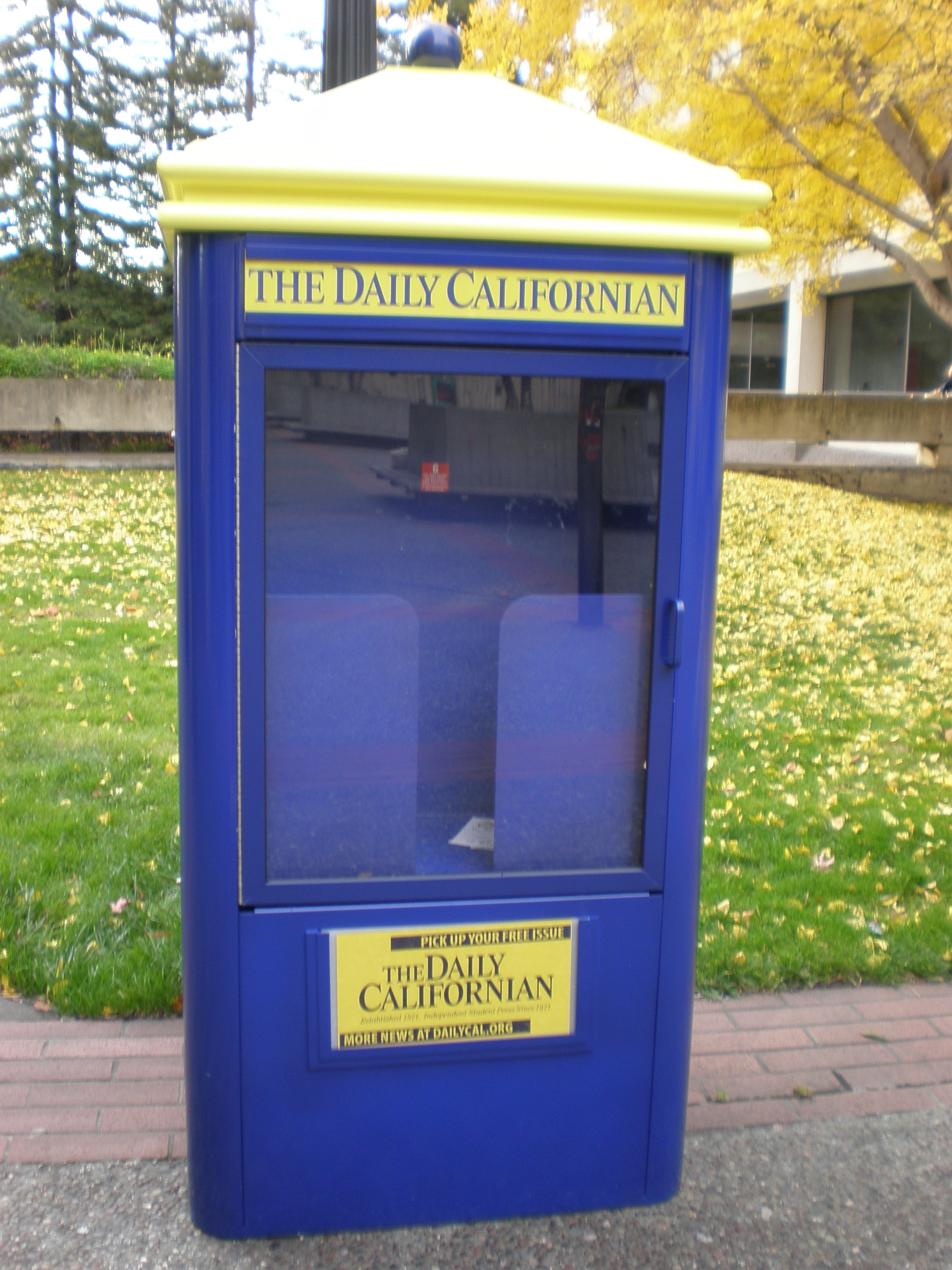
A Daily Cal rack on the UC Berkeley campus

The Daily Californian became independent from UC Berkeley in 1971 after the campus administration fired three senior editors over an editorial that encouraged readers to "take back" People's Park. Both sides came to an agreement, and The Daily Californian gained financial and editorial independence from the university and is now published by an independent corporation called the Independent Berkeley Students Publishing Company, Inc. The paper licenses its name from the Regents of the University of California.

On November 24, 1982, three days after the November 20th Big Game (now known for The Play), early morning readers of the Daily Cal were chagrined to find in the headline of the front page: "NCAA Awards Big Game to Stanford." Hundreds of copies of the Daily Cal with this fake headline had been strewn about campus in the wee hours. This was in fact a hoax perpetrated by aggrieved Stanford fans.

The Daily Californian has a history of publishing spirited editorials, and in some cases, editions containing controversial editorials have been subjected to newspaper theft. In 2002, Berkeley Mayor Tom Bates agreed to pay restitution after admitting to having thrown away a thousand copies of The Daily Californian after it endorsed his opponent, then-Mayor Shirley Dean. In May 2003, nearly 5,000 papers were stolen by students protesting coverage of the arrest of a Cal football player. The largest act of theft took place in November 1996 when the paper's senior editorial board endorsed Proposition 209. Nearly 23,000 papers were stolen on Election Day 1996, and in the following days, copies of the paper were tossed off the balcony of the newspaper's office and burned in effigy.

As a way to repair relations with campus community members angered by the publication of the editorial endorsing Proposition 209, editors at the Daily Cal established the nation's first regular college newspaper sex column. The column, now known colloquially as "Sex on Tuesday", led to college papers across the country to create similar sex columns.

=== 21st century ===
On October 16, 2006, the Daily Cal launched its first blog, The Daily Clog, a student-life blog that accumulates various tidbits about Berkeley and college life.

On August 25, 2008, the Daily Cal announced that it would no longer print a paper version of the newspaper on Wednesdays amidst a decline in advertising revenues and higher newspaper costs.

== The Daily Californian Alumni Association ==
Many former Daily Cal staffers have joined The Daily Californian Alumni Association (DCAA) since its resurrection in August 1996. A unit of The Daily Californian Education Foundation, the DCAA provides mentorship and financial support to the current student staff.

Membership is open to all former staff members of The Daily Californian or student publications office staff (pre 1971). Reunions are held every October during homecoming weekend on the Berkeley campus.

== Notable alumni ==
- Adam Rapoport (1992), former editor-in-chief, Bon Appétit
- Max Boot (1992), conservative columnist and author
- Darrin Bell (1993), Pulitzer Prize-winning editorial cartoonist, Washington Post Writers Group and King Features
- David Brock (1983), founder, Media Matters for America
- Warrington Colescott (1941–42), painter and printmaker
- John R. Emshwiller (1972), senior national correspondent, The Wall Street Journal
- Ron Fimrite (1949), humorist, historian, author, and sportswriter, Sports Illustrated
- Marguerite Higgins (1941), Pulitzer Prize-winning war correspondent
- Karl Kasten (1938), abstract expressionist artist
- David Lazarus (1983), business and consumer columnist, Los Angeles Times and San Francisco Chronicle
- T. Christian Miller (1992), Pulitzer Prize-winning investigative reporter, author, and war correspondent, ProPublica
- Johnathan A. Rodgers (1967), CEO and president, TV One, former president, Discovery Networks, and reporter, Sports Illustrated and Newsweek
- Michael Silver (1988), columnist, NFL.com and Sports Illustrated, where he authored the magazine's Super Bowl game story for 12 straight years from 1994 through 2006, and co-author of books by Jerry Rice, Dennis Rodman, Kurt Warner, and Natalie Coughlin
- Henry T. Weinstein (1966), reporter, Los Angeles Times
- Jann Wenner (1966), founder, Rolling Stone magazine

== See also ==
- List of college newspapers
- Berkeley Political Review
