= Nancy Skinner (politician) =

American politician (born 1954)

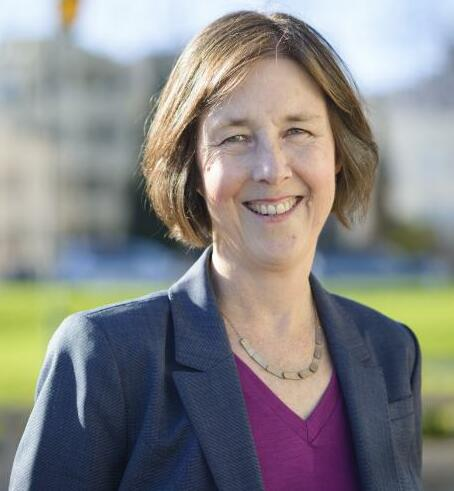
- Skinner in 2016

Commissioner of the California Energy Commission
- Incumbent
- Assumed office January 2025
- Preceded by: Patty Monahan

Member of the California State Senate from the 9th district
- In office December 5, 2016 – November 30, 2024
- Preceded by: Loni Hancock
- Succeeded by: Jesse Arreguin

Member of the California State Assembly
- In office December 1, 2008 – November 30, 2014
- Preceded by: Loni Hancock
- Succeeded by: Tony Thurmond
- Constituency: 14th district (2008–2012); 15th district (2012–2014)

Member of the East Bay Regional Park Board for Ward 1
- In office March 21, 2006 – December 1, 2008
- Preceded by: Jean Siri

Member of the Berkeley City Council
- In office 1984–1992

Personal details
- Born: August 12, 1954 (age 72) San Francisco, California, U.S.
- Party: Democratic
- Other political affiliations: Democratic Socialists of America (c. 1980s)
- Spouse: Lance
- Children: 1
- Education: University of California, Berkeley (BA, MA)
- Profession: Environmental activist, politician

Nancy Skinner (born August 12, 1954) is an American politician who served as a member of the California State Senate from 2016 to 2024. A Democrat, she represented California's 9th State Senatorial district, encompassing parts of the East Bay. In January 2025, Skinner was appointed to serve on the California Energy Commission.

Prior to her election to the State Senate in 2016, Skinner was a member of the California State Assembly representing California's 15th State Assembly district from 2008 to 2014. She also served as a member of the East Bay Regional Park Board, representing Ward 1 from 2006 to 2008. Skinner was a member of the Berkeley City Council from 1984 to 1992; she was the first student ever elected to the Berkeley City Council. She had previously founded and worked for several non-profit groups on global warming and other issues related to environmental policy.

== Early political career ==
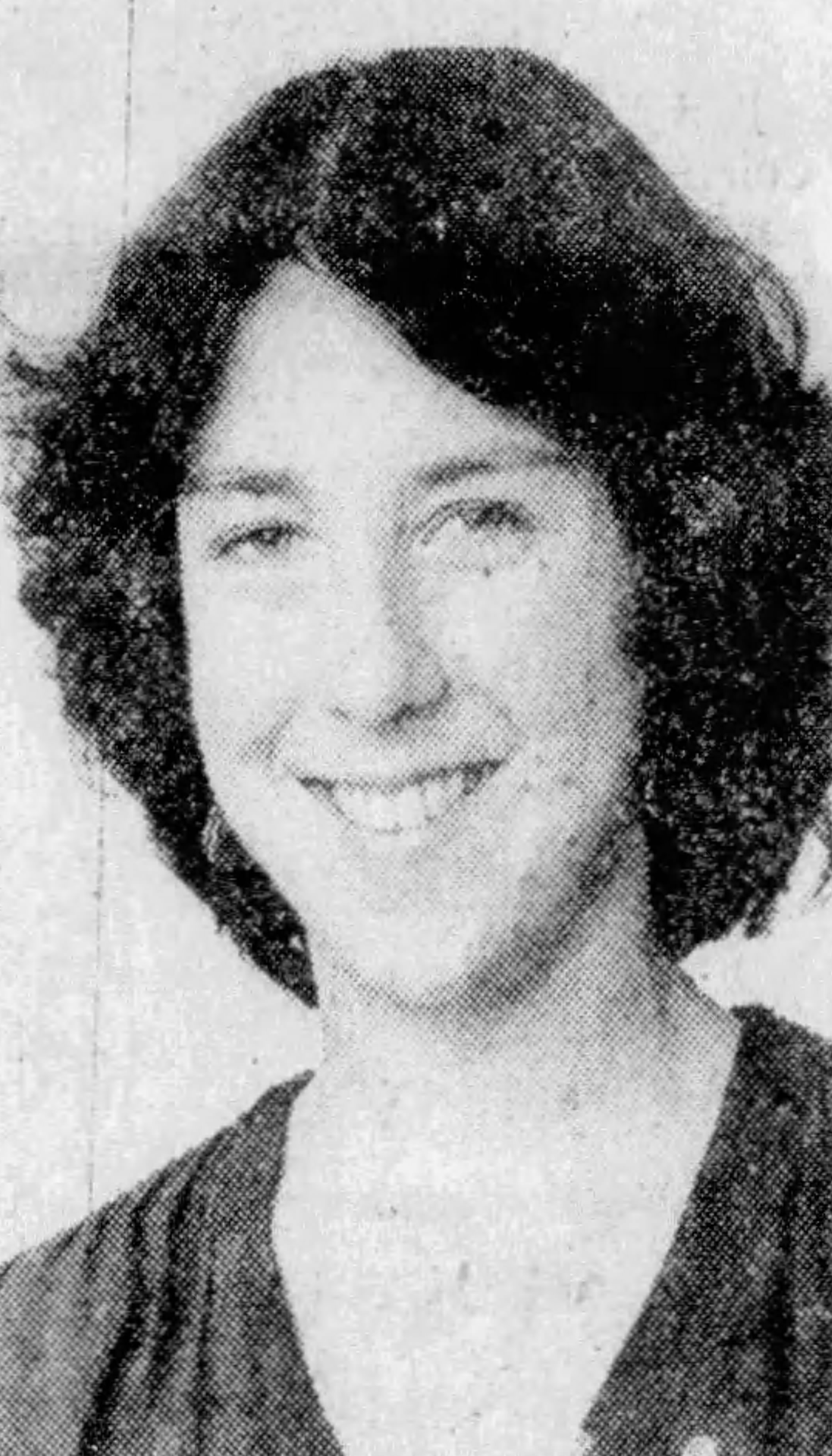
Skinner c. 1981

Skinner attended the University of California, Berkeley, earning a B.S. from the UC Berkeley College of Natural Resources and a Masters in Education from the UC Berkeley School of Education. As a student, she was a leader in the Anti-Apartheid Movement, served as the Academic Affairs Vice President of the ASUC, the student government, and was a founder of ASGE, the Union of Graduate Student Employees. Skinner later taught courses in native California plants and interned at the Golden Gate National Recreation Area.

Skinner first ran for public office in 1981, when she campaigned unsuccessfully for Berkeley City Council while still a student at UC Berkeley. Three years later, she ran again as an undergraduate student and was elected, serving from 1984 to 1992. She was the first student ever elected to the City Council. During her tenure, she was a member of the Democratic Socialists of America.

== Activism ==
After serving on the City Council, she co-founded ICLEI — Local Governments for Sustainability, a coalition of 800 global cities, and Cities for Climate Protection with 500 U.S. member cities, to assist urban regions with environmental and global warming policy, respectively. She was the U.S. director of The Climate Group, an international organization that works with businesses to address global warming. She also coauthored the best selling book series, Fifty Things You Can Do to Save the Earth and has written a pair of articles concerning global warming for the San Francisco Chronicle.

Skinner coordinated Loni Hancock's 2002 State Assembly campaign and was a Field Manager for Barbara Lee's 2002 Congressional campaign.

== Recent political career ==
Skinner was appointed to the East Bay Regional Park District board of directors in March 2006 to fill a vacancy due to the death of incumbent Jean Siri. She was appointed by a 6–0 vote. Skinner was then elected to the board in 2006 with 84% of the vote. The district includes parts of Albany, Berkeley, El Cerrito, El Sobrante, Emeryville, Kensington, Richmond, San Pablo, Pinole & Oakland.

Skinner was considered a likely candidate for the California state Assembly as early as 2006 and had previously considered a run in 2002. She ultimately announced her candidacy in late January 2008 and was elected to the State Assembly later that year. She was re-elected in 2010 and 2012.

In 2016, Skinner ran for the California State Senate to replace Senator Loni Hancock, who was termed-out of office in 2016. She was elected to office on November 8, 2016 and sworn in on December 5, 2016. In the 2017–2018 and 2019–2020 legislative sessions, she served as the Majority Whip of the state Senate. In the 2019 legislative session, she chaired the state Senate's Public Safety committee. In November 2020, Skinner won reelection to the Senate for another four-year term.

== Legislation ==
- Internet Fairness — AB 155: Skinner pushed legislation to tax online sales that was approved in 2009 as part of the state budget. Governor Arnold Schwarzenegger vetoed the legislation. On January 19, 2011, Skinner introduced similar legislation in the form of AB153. The bill requires out-of-state online sellers with affiliates in California to collect sales tax on purchases made by state residents. The affiliate provision was included to ensure that only sellers with a California nexus are taxed, as required by federal law. "This legislation will close the current loophole in tax law which has allowed out-of-state companies to avoid collecting California sales and use tax," stated Skinner. Skinner estimated that AB153 could produce between $250 million and $500 million per year in new revenue. She and other supporters of the bill believe that the election of Jerry Brown to the governorship and support from retailers such as Barnes & Noble will help the measure become law.
- Red Flag Law — AB 1014: In 2014, Skinner authored AB 1014, which established the nation's first gun violence restraining order (GVRO), also known as the "Red Flag" law. GVROs allow law enforcement, family members, educators, co-workers and employers to petition a court to remove guns and ammunition from a person who poses a serious threat to themselves or others.

=== Education ===
- Childcare and PreSchool Expansion — 2014 Budget Bill: As Budget Chair Skinner facilitated the largest funding increase for early childhood education in over a decade, enabling the State to enroll thousands more children in preschool and quality childcare.
- Higher Ed Funding While Halting Tuition Increases — 2014 Budget Bill: The University of California and California State University systems suffered huge recession cuts resulting in student tuition and fee increases. As Budget Chair Skinner worked for a larger state allocation to UC and CSU with language that would rescind the funds if UC/CSU increased student tuition.
- Saving Energy Saving Schools — AB/SB 39: Schools spend millions of dollars each year on energy, Skinner's legislation, AB/SB 39, provided every California school district Proposition 39 funds to pay for energy upgrades, enabling the money saved on utility bills to go back into the classroom.
- CalFresh for College Students — AB 1930/SB 641. In 2014, Skinner authored AB 1930, which created a state working group within the California Department of Social Services (CDSS) to examine ways to make CalFresh more accessible to college students. In 2022, Skinner authored SB 641, which required CDSS to identify the necessary changes to improve access to CalFresh for college students.
- Fair Pay to Play Act—SB 206. In 2019, Skinner authored a landmark law that made California the first state in the nation to enact legislation allowing college athletes to earn money from the use of their name, image, and likeness (NIL). The law spurred other states to pass similar laws. In 2021, the NCAA followed California's lead and gave NIL rights to college athletes throughout the nation.
- Fair Pay to Play Act II — SB 26: In 2021, Skinner authored a law that expanded on SB 206, the Fair Pay to Play Act, and moved up the implementation date to Sept. 1, 2021. SB 26 also allowed community college athletes to earn money from their name, image, and likeness.
- Ending Willful Defiance Suspensions—SB 419. In 2019, Skinner authored a law that "prohibits willful defiance suspensions in grades four and five. It also bans such suspensions in grades six through eight for five years."
- Keep Kids in School—SB 274. In 2023, Skinner authored a follow-up law to SB 419 (2019), banning willful defiance suspensions in California’s public high schools until 2029 and extending the ban on willful defiance suspensions in middle schools until 2029.
- School Meals for All — In 2021, Sen. Skinner authored SB 364, School Meals for All. The bill's language was included in the 2021-22 California Budget Act, making California the first state in the nation to offer two free school meals a day to all public school students.
- Healthy Meals for Kids—SB 348. In 2023, Skinner authored a follow-up law to School Meals for All that made California the first state to codify President Joe Biden’s new federal guidelines on school nutrition standards aimed at reducing sugars and salt in school meals.

=== Criminal justice reform ===
- SB394 — The bill was signed into law in October 2019. It allowed counties within the state to establish diversion programs for defendants who are primary caregivers of minors. It is supposed to reduce trauma for children would have otherwise had a parent incarcerated. The system in San Francisco allowed for defendants with misdemeanors and nonviolent charges to apply. The successful completion of the program would drop the charges against the defendant. The California District Attorney's Association opposed the bill, citing potential loopholes for sex offenders.
- Police Records I — SB 1421. In 2018, Skinner authored a landmark law that opened up opened up certain types of police misconduct records for the first time in four decades in California. The records made public include reports, investigations, or findings of incidents involving the discharge of a firearm or electronic control weapons by an officer; strikes of impact weapons or projectiles to the head or neck area; deadly force or serious bodily injury by an officer; sustained findings of sexual assault by an officer; and sustained findings of dishonesty by a peace officer.
- Police Records II — SB 16. In 2021, Skinner authored a new law that expanded on SB 1421 to include other the types police records on officers with a history of biased or discriminatory behavior, unlawful arrests and searches, or excessive or unreasonable force.
- Felony Murder Reform — SB 1437. In 2018, Skinner authored a new law reforming California's felony murder rule to ensure that people convicted of murder actually committed murder or were active participants in the killing. The law also allowed individuals previously sentenced on a theory of felony murder to petition for resentencing.
- Expanding Eligibility for Peace Officers — SB 960. In 2022, Skinner authored a new law that removed the rule preventing CA law enforcement from hiring noncitizens who have full legal work authorization and meet all other requirements to serve as peace officers.

=== Climate and environment ===
- Naming Eastshore State Park after Save the Bay Founder — AC 55: California's 8.5-mile (13.7 km) ribbon of parkland along the eastern side of San Francisco Bay is now named after Save the Bay co-founder Sylvia McLaughlin due to Skinner, a worthy recognition of her significant leadership.
- Energy Storage — AB 2514. In 2010, Skinner authored a groundbreaking law that launched California's world-leading effort to create large-scale battery storage to reduce the state's reliance on fossil fuel power plants. By 2024, California led the nation in large-scale energy storage.
- Banning Oil Price Gouging — SBX 1-2. In 2023, Skinner authored a groundbreaking law sponsored by Governor Gavin Newsom that created the strongest and most effective transparency measures in the nation to ensure that oil companies do not price gouge Californians at the gas pump.

=== Housing ===
- Housing Crisis Act of 2019 — SB 330. In 2019, Skinner authored SB 330, a law designed to boost housing construction in California by slashing the time to get new developments approved and banning local governments from imposing population and housing caps though 2025.
- Housing Crisis Act II — SB 8. In 2021, Skinner authored SB 8, a law that extended the provisions of SB 330 to 2030.
- Housing Accountability Act — SB 167. In 2017, Skinner authored SB 167, a law that strengthened California's Housing Accountability Act by increasing legal penalties levied on cities that illegally block housing.
- Foreclosed and Vacant Homes — SB 1079. In 2020, Skinner authored SB 1079, a law gave cities and counties tools to prevent corporations from keeping homes vacant and awarded tenants the right of first refusal to buy foreclosed properties.

=== Gender, abortion and LGBTQIA+ rights ===
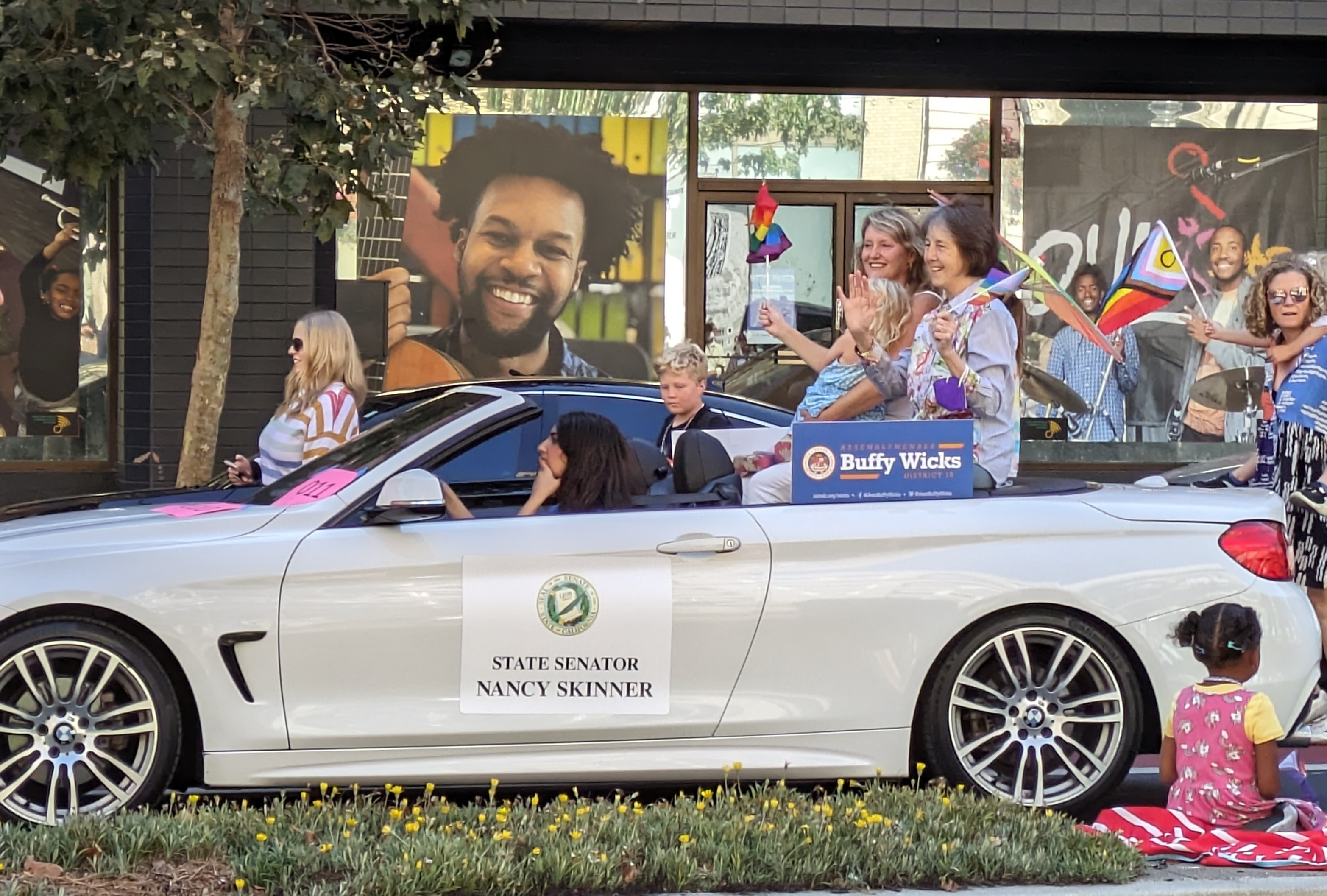
Skinner at Oakland Pride in 2023

- Shield Law Protecting Medication Abortion & Gender Affirming Care—SB 345. In 2023, Skinner authored a landmark law providing legal protections for California health care practitioners who provide or dispense medication or other services for abortion, contraception or gender-affirming care, regardless of their patient’s location.
