= Tom Bates =

American politician (born 1938)

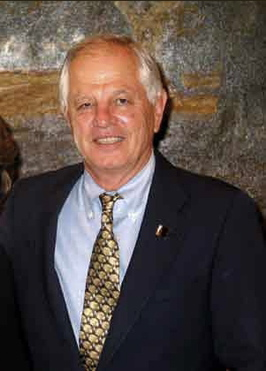

21st Mayor of Berkeley
- In office December 2002 – December 2016
- Preceded by: Shirley Dean
- Succeeded by: Jesse Arreguín

Personal details
- Born: February 9, 1938 (age 88)
- Party: Democratic
- Spouse: Loni Hancock

Thomas H. Bates (born February 9, 1938) was the 21st mayor of Berkeley, California, and a member of the California State Assembly. Bates is married to Loni Hancock, another former mayor of Berkeley and State Assembly member who served in the California State Senate. He is a graduate of the University of California, Berkeley and was a member of the Golden Bears' 1959 Rose Bowl team. Bates was a captain in the United States Army Reserves after graduating from college and served in Germany. He worked in real estate before serving on the Alameda County Board of Supervisors and in the state legislature.

== Alameda County Board of Supervisors ==
Bates was the youngest elected Supervisor in Alameda County history at the age of 34 and the first full-time Supervisor from 1971 to 1976. During his term Alameda County gave the highest percentage of its Community Revenue Sharing money to community-based programs. The following programs were funded: Asian Health Center, Asian Mental Health Center, Clínica de la Raza, East Oakland Health Clinic, Over 60 Clinic, Center for Independence Living, Bonita House, Berkeley Place, Berkeley Battered Women's Shelter, Filipinos for Affirmative Action, Berkeley-Oakland Support Services, Pro Arts, Berkeley Youth Alternatives, Berkeley Free Clinic, Pacific Center, Creative Growth Center, Bananas, Berkeley Women's Health Center, Berkeley Rape Crisis Center, and West Oakland Health Center. The County also enacted a 100-acre minimum zoning law to protect agricultural open space.

== State Assembly ==
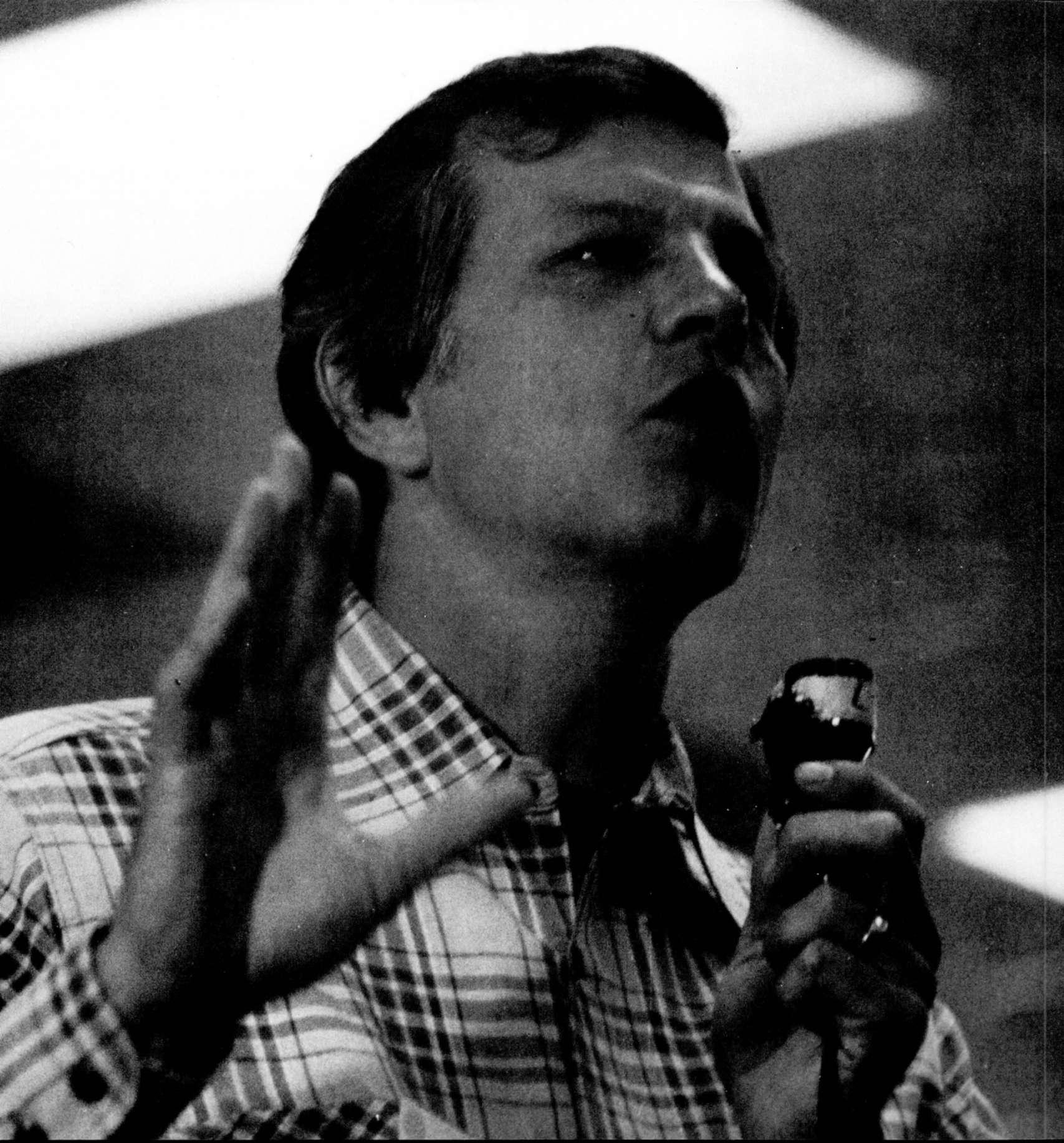
Bates speaking at a conference on disability leadership in 1981

Bates served in the California State Assembly representing the 12th District (the East Bay Area) from 1977 to 1993 and the 14th District from 1993 to 1997. During those years he was known as one of the legislature's most liberal members. Under Republican governors, Bates authored over 220 bills that became law, including the creation of the East Bay Shoreline State Park, a number of progressive social policy laws including the Community Residential Treatment legislation ("the Bates Bill"), and the founding of the first Community Bank in the Bay Area. Bates authored the first legislation in the country allowing "brew pubs", establishments that brew their own beer for sales on and off the premises and are typically combined with a restaurant.

After retiring from the Assembly in 1996, Bates taught at UC Berkeley and worked to ensure healthier foods in the Oakland and Berkeley school districts. In 2002 Bates was drafted out of retirement to challenge the two-term incumbent mayor of Berkeley, Shirley Dean. He won the race with 55% of the vote.

== Mayor ==
Bates personally stole approximately 200 copies of The Daily Californian on the day before the 2002 Berkeley mayoral election after the student-run campus newspaper endorsed his opponent, then-Mayor Shirley Dean. He won the election the next day. Bates acknowledged taking the papers and wasn't charged but voluntarily donated $500 to the Daily Cal. Following his election, Bates led the city council in passing an ordinance that outlawed the stealing of free newspapers and gave a series of talks discussing his mistakes and what he learned from them. Four years later the California legislature passed a similar law that applies statewide.

Housing and urban development were major issues throughout Bates's tenure as mayor. His success in promoting an environmental agenda as a member the California Assembly led him to partner with environmental groups like the Sierra Club in promoting a series of "Smart Growth" policies for Berkeley and the Bay Area. In addition to advocating dense, transit-oriented urban development, Bates worked to mitigate the effects of Berkeley's rapidly rising housing costs on the city's low-income residents. He proposed a municipal density bonus program to incentivize the inclusion of affordable units in new developments and increase the fees that developers must pay into the city's Housing Trust Fund. Bates also put up resistance to UC Berkeley's expansion. In 2004, following the release of UC's Long-Range Development Plan, he promised to fight the expansion "tooth and nail." Saying "the university asked us to sign the equivalent of a blank check," Bates announced that the city would file a $4.1 million lawsuit against the university. After a year of negotiations in which the university agreed to increase its ongoing fiscal support for city services, the lawsuit was settled for $1.2 million.

In 2004 Berkeley voters approved Measure I, amending the city's charter to change the date of mayoral elections to coincide with presidential elections and to adjust the mayor's 2006 term to two years on a one-time basis to accomplish this result. Therefore the next mayoral election took place in 2008.

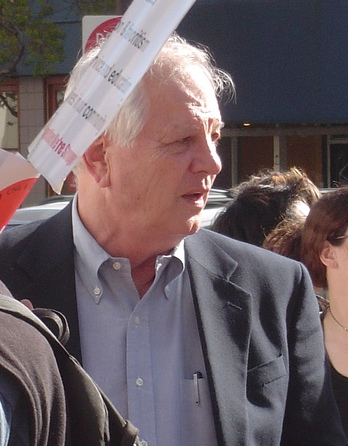
Bates at a strike for UC workers in 2005.

In 2006 Bates won reelection in a landslide, defeating former City Planning Commissioner Zelda Bronstein 63% to 31%, the largest margin of victory in a Berkeley mayor's race since 1967. (Native American and community activist Zachary Runningwolf and Christian Pecaut won 5% and 1%, respectively.)

In January 2008 Berkeley drew national attention when the city council passed a motion to send a letter to the US Marines to tell them they were "unwelcome intruders." Bates voted to approve the motion. He voted to amend the letter on February 12 to remove language like "unwelcome intruder". On February 13, 2008, Bates said: "I think it stands [that] we didn't want them here and they came here. And [they are] unwelcome. You know, we'd like them to leave voluntarily. So I don't think an apology is in order."

In November 2008 Bates was reelected to a third term by a large margin, defeating former mayor Shirley Dean 61% to 36% (two official write-in candidates won 3% collectively.) In 2009 Bates appeared in the documentary film Power Trip: Theatrically Berkeley. The film is centered around the implementation of Measure G, The Green Measure, meant to help Berkeley lead the nation to a more environmentally friendly future. The film played in Berkeley and is scheduled for a New York release in February 2023 in an effort to promote a staged version.

In 2012 Bates was reelected to a fourth term with 55% of the vote, defeating opponents including Kriss Worthington, poet Mark Schwartz, and Jacquelyn McCormick.

In 2014 Bates placed on the ballot the Downtown Development Plan, which passed by 62% and established transit-oriented development downtown.

In June 2015 Bates was at the focal point of the Berkeley Balcony Collapse tragedy, which claimed the lives of 5 young Irish J1 students and an Irish-American student. Bates was praised by the Irish media for the sensitivity and consideration he showed and the support he gave to the Irish J1 community and the victims' families. He promised a wide-ranging investigating into the cause of the accident. Considered the likeliest cause was that the balcony was not constructed properly, leading to dry rot, leading to the balcony becoming structurally compromised.

Bates was the longest-serving mayor in Berkeley's history, serving 14 years. During his mayoralty, the city built the David Brower Center, the Center for Independent Living building "Ed Roberts Campus", the YMCA Youth Center and the 5 City "Tom Bates Sports Facility". He also served on the Metropolitan Transportation Commission, Bay Conservation Commission and Development Board and Bay Area Air Pollution Board.

California Assembly
| Preceded by Ken Meade | California State Assemblyman, 12th District; 1976–1992 | Succeeded by John L. Burton |
| Preceded by Johan Klehs | California State Assemblyman, 14th District; 1992–1996 | Succeeded by Dion Aroner |
Political offices
| Preceded by Shirley Dean | Mayor of Berkeley, California; 2002–2016 | Succeeded by Jesse Arreguín |
