= 2010 United States Senate election in California =

- November 2, 2010
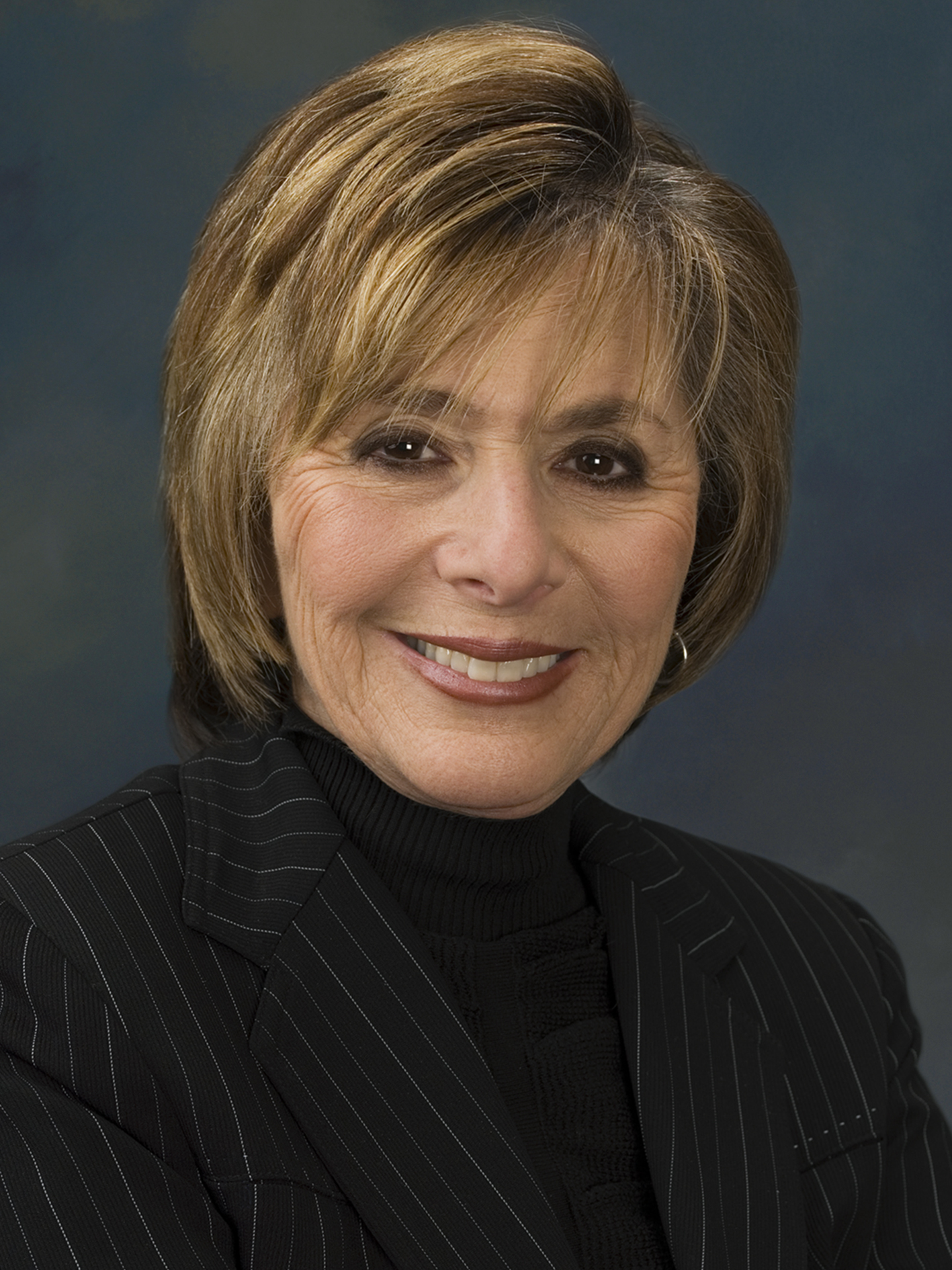

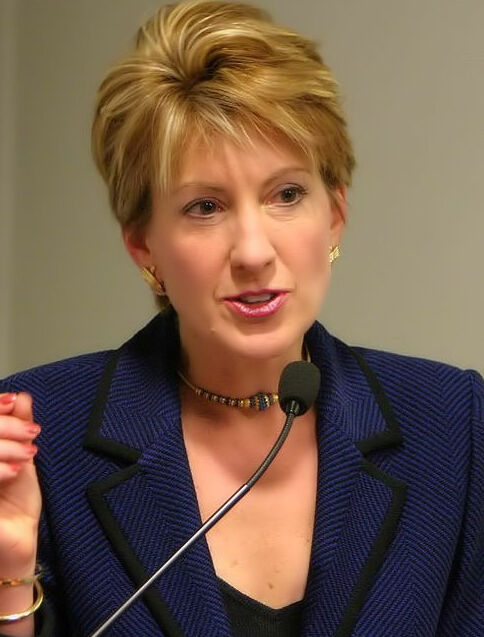
Nominee	Barbara Boxer	Carly Fiorina
Party	Democratic	Republican
Popular vote	5,218,137	4,217,386
Percentage	52.18%	42.17%
- Boxer: 40–50% 50–60% 60–70% 70–80% 80–90% Fiorina: 40–50% 50–60% 60–70% 70–80%
U.S. senator before election
Barbara Boxer
Democratic
Elected U.S. Senator
Barbara Boxer
Democratic

The 2010 United States Senate election in California took place on November 2, 2010. The election was held alongside 33 other United States Senate elections, in addition to congressional, state, and various local elections. Incumbent Democratic U.S. Senator Barbara Boxer won re-election to a fourth term.

== Democratic primary ==
=== Candidates ===
- Barbara Boxer, incumbent U.S. senator
- Mickey Kaus, journalist and blogger
- Brian Quintana, businessman and educator

=== Campaign ===
In 2009, Boxer was criticized for correcting a general who called her "ma'am". Brigadier General Michael Walsh was testifying on the Louisiana coastal restoration process in the wake of Hurricane Katrina and answered Boxer's query with "ma'am" when Boxer interrupted him: "Do me a favor. Can you say 'senator' instead of 'ma'am'?" Walsh interjected: "Yes, ma'am." Boxer replied: "It's just a thing, I worked so hard to get that title, so I'd appreciate it. Thank you."

The Army's guide to protocol instructs service members to call members of the U.S. Senate "sir", "ma'am", or "senator".

Fiorina used this incident prominently in campaign ads, as did David Zucker, who directed a humorous commercial for RightChange.com titled "Call Me Senator".

=== Results ===
Democratic primary results
Party	Candidate	Votes	%
Democratic	Barbara Boxer (incumbent)	1,957,920	81.0
Democratic	Brian Quintana	338,442	13.9
Democratic	Mickey Kaus	123,573	5.1
Total votes		2,419,935	100.0

== Republican primary ==
=== Candidates ===
- Tom Campbell, former U.S. representative from Silicon Valley (1989–93 and 1995–2001) and candidate for Senate in 1992 and 2000
- Chuck DeVore, state assemblyman from Irvine (2004–10)
- Carly Fiorina, former CEO of Hewlett-Packard
- Tim Kalemkarian
- Al Ramirez, businessman

==== Declined ====
- Arnold Schwarzenegger, governor of California since 2003

=== Campaign ===
Through 2009, the race largely shaped up as a campaign between former Hewlett-Packard executive Carly Fiorina and Irvine assemblyman Chuck DeVore. In November 2009, the Los Angeles Times reported that Fiorina had failed to vote in most elections. Fiorina apologized by saying, "I'm a lifelong registered Republican but I haven't always voted, and I will provide no excuse for it. You know, people die for the right to vote. And there are many, many Californians and Americans who exercise that civic duty on a regular basis. I didn't. Shame on me."

In January 2010, Tom Campbell joined the race. He had previously been running for governor and had run unsuccessful campaigns for Senate in 1992 and 2000. Campbell led in initial public polling over Fiorina and DeVore. However, his campaign declined after sustained negative attacks from Fiorina and controversy over his past support for and association with Sami Al-Arian.

In February, Fiorina put out a campaign ad attacking Campbell as a wolf in sheep's clothing for his relatively liberal voting record. The ad, which became known as the Demon Sheep ad, gained international, mostly negative, publicity for its bizarre visuals, including a man in a sheep costume with glowing red eyes.

Fiorina was more successful in attacking Campbell in February over his associations with Sami Al-Arian, a computer engineering professor at the University of South Florida who had pleaded guilty in 2006 after a lengthy trial for conspiracy to help the Palestinian Islamic Jihad, a designated terrorist group. In 2000, Campbell had received campaign contributions from Al-Arian, and in January 2002, Campbell wrote a letter opposing academic discipline for Al-Arian.

Campbell initially denied that he had received contributions from Al-Arian, which proved to be untrue. He defended the letter by arguing that he had not been aware of the charges against Al-Arian when he wrote it and had also not been aware of comments Al-Arian had recorded in Cleveland, Ohio in 1988, when he shouted, "Jihad is our path. Victory to Islam. Death to Israel." Al-Arian had previously defended the remarks on a September 26, 2001 episode of The O'Reilly Factor; Campbell initially claimed that his letter had been sent before the O'Reilly interview, but Al-Arian was placed on initial academic leave shortly after the interview. Despite this, Campbell maintained,

I did not hear, I did not read, I was not aware of statements Sami Al-Arian had made relative to Israel. And I would not have written the letter had I known about those. ... To say 'Death to Israel' is abhorrent; it's horrible.

As a result of his Al-Arian associations, Fiorina accused Campbell of being unfriendly to the interests of Israel. In late February, former California Secretary of State and state senator Bruce McPherson claimed that Fiorina campaign manager Marty Wilson, a longtime Sacramento political operative, had called Campbell an antisemite and expressed surprise that McPherson was endorsing Campbell. Wilson strongly denied McPherson's charge.

A live March 5 debate between the three main candidates was hosted by KTKZ in Sacramento and focused on the issue at Campbell's behest. Campbell responded strongly to Fiorina's accusations, saying, "I called for this debate today so that both of my opponents can bring up absolutely any charge they want. Air it, and let me respond to it. But there's no place for calling me antisemitic, then denying it. That whispering campaign, that 'silent slander,' stops today." Campbell maintained that he had not been aware of Al-Arian's statements and attributed his earlier inaccurate claims to failures of memory, but he apologized for not researching the matter more thoroughly before writing the letter.

After the March debate, Campbell appeared to maintain his lead in polling, with polls throughout the spring showing him leading Fiorina in the primary and leading or even with Boxer in the general election. However, Fiorina surged into the lead in May after dedicating a significant portion of her personal fortune, including a $5.5 million loan to her campaign, to a late advertising push. She additionally secured the endorsement of Alaska governor and 2008 vice presidential nominee Sarah Palin, who remained popular with rank-and-file Republican voters.

=== Polling ===
Poll source	Date(s) administered	Sample size	Margin of error	Tom Campbell	Carly Fiorina	Chuck DeVore	Other	Undecided
The Field Poll (report)	Feb. 20 – March 1, 2009	298	±3.6%	—	31%	19%	—	36%
The Field Poll (report)	Sept. 18 – October 6, 2009	373	±4.5%	—	21%	20%	—	59%
Los Angeles Times (report)	Oct. 27 – November 3, 2009	499	—	—	27%	27%	2%	40%
The Field Poll (report)	January 5–17, 2010	202	±7.1%	30%	25%	6%	—	39%
PPIC (report)	January 27, 2010	2,001	±2.0%	27%	16%	8%	1%	48%
M4 Strategies (report)	February 26, 2010	427	—	32%	19%	11%	—	39%
Research 2000 (report)	March 10, 2010	400	±5.0%	33%	24%	7%	—	36%
PPIC (report)	March 24, 2010	2,002	±2.0%	23%	24%	8%	1%	44%
Los Angeles Times (report)	March 23–30, 2010	1,515	±2.6%	29%	25%	9%	4%	33%
Survey USA (report)	April 19–21, 2010	538	±4.3%	34%	27%	14%	3%	23%
Survey USA (report)	May 6–9, 2010	548	±4.3%	35%	24%	15%	3%	23%
Research 2000 (report)	May 17–19, 2010	400	±5.0%	37%	22%	14%	—	27%
PPIC (report)	May 9–16, 2010	1,168	±3.0%	23%	25%	16%	—	36%
Public Policy Polling (report)	May 21–23, 2010	417	±4.8%	21%	41%	16%	—	18%
Survey USA (report)	May 21–23, 2010	612	±4.3%	23%	46%	14%	6%	11%
Los Angeles Times (report)	May 19–26, 2010	1,506	±2.6%	23%	38%	16%	23%	
Survey USA (report)	June 3–6, 2010	569	±4.2%	22%	48%	16%	9%	

=== Results ===
Results by county: Fiorina: 40–50%; 50–60%; 60–70%; Campbell: 40–50%

Republican primary results
Party	Candidate	Votes	%
Republican	Carly Fiorina	1,315,429	56.4
Republican	Tom Campbell	504,289	21.7
Republican	Chuck DeVore	452,577	19.3
Republican	Al Ramirez	42,149	1.8
Republican	Tim Kalemkarian	19,598	0.8
Total votes		2,334,042	100.0

== Third party primaries ==
=== Candidates ===
American Independent

- Don Grundmann, chiropractor and American Independent nominee for the U.S. Senate in 2006
- Edward Noonan, small-business owner
- Al Salehi, political analyst

California American Independent Senate primary, 2010
Party	Candidate	Votes	%
American Independent	Edward Noonan	16,704	39.5
American Independent	Don Grundmann	14,170	33.5
American Independent	Al Salehi	11,423	27.0
Total votes		42,297	100.0

Green

- Duane Roberts, community volunteer

California Green Senate primary, 2010
Party	Candidate	Votes	%
Green	Duane Roberts	19,983	100.00%
Total votes		19,983	100.0

Libertarian

- Gail Lightfoot, retired nurse

California Libertarian Senate primary, 2010
Party	Candidate	Votes	%
Libertarian	Gail Lightfoot	17,791	100.00%
Total votes		17,791	100.0

Peace and Freedom

- Marsha Feinland, retired teacher and Peace and Freedom nominee for president in 1996

California Peace and Freedom Senate primary, 2010
Party	Candidate	Votes	%
Peace and Freedom	Marsha Feinland	4,070	100.00%
Total votes		4,070	100.0

== General election ==
=== Candidates ===
The following were certified by the California secretary of state as candidates in the general election for senator.

- Barbara Boxer (Democratic), incumbent U.S. senator
- Marsha Feinland (Peace and Freedom), retired teacher and Peace and Freedom nominee for president in 1996
- Carly Fiorina (Republican), former CEO of Hewlett-Packard
- Gail Lightfoot (Libertarian), retired nurse
- Edward Noonan (American Independent Party), small-business owner
- Duane Roberts (Green), community volunteer

=== Campaign ===
Boxer criticized Fiorina's choice "to become a CEO, lay off 30,000 workers, ship jobs overseas [and] have two yachts." A spokesman for Fiorina responded that the Fiorinas were a two-yacht family because they spent time in both California and Washington, D.C. Boxer also claimed that Fiorina "skirted the law" by selling equipment to Iran during her tenure as HP's CEO, also claiming that the equipment may have ended up in the hands of the Iranian military.

=== Debate ===
The only debate took place on September 1 at Saint Mary's College of California in Moraga. It was sponsored by the San Francisco Chronicle, KTVU, and KQED.

2010 United States Senate election in California debate
No.	Date	Host	Moderator	Link	Democratic	Republican
Key: P Participant A Absent N Not invited I Invited W Withdrawn						
Key: P Participant A Absent N Not invited I Invited W Withdrawn					Boxer	Fiorina
1	Sep. 1, 2010	KQED-FM; KTVU; San Francisco Chronicle	Randy Shandobil	C-SPAN	P	P

=== Predictions ===
Source	Ranking	As of
Cook Political Report	Tossup	October 26, 2010
Rothenberg	Tilt D	October 22, 2010
RealClearPolitics	Tossup	October 26, 2010
Sabato's Crystal Ball	Lean D	October 21, 2010
CQ Politics	Lean D	October 26, 2010

=== Polling ===
Poll source	Date(s) administered	Sample size	Margin of error	Barbara Boxer (D)	Carly Fiorina (R)	Other	Undecided
The Field Poll (report)	Feb. 20 – March 1, 2009	761	± 3.6%	55%	25%	—	20%
Rasmussen Reports (report)	March 9, 2009	500	± 4.5%	47%	38%	10%	5%
Rasmussen Reports (report)	July 22, 2009	500	± 4.5%	45%	41%	7%	7%
Research 2000 (report)	August 9–12, 2009	600	± 4.0%	52%	31%	—	17%
Rasmussen Reports (report)	September 23, 2009	500	± 4.5%	49%	39%	4%	8%
The Field Poll (report)	Sept. 18 – October 6, 2009	1,005	± 3.2%	49%	35%	—	16%
Rasmussen Reports (report)	November 17, 2009	500	± 4.5%	46%	37%	5%	12%
Rasmussen Reports (report)	January 14, 2010	500	± 4.5%	46%	43%	3%	8%
The Field Poll (report)	January 5–17, 2010	1,005	± 3.2%	50%	35%	—	15%
PPIC (report)	January 27, 2010	2,001	± 2.0%	48%	40%	—	12%
Rasmussen Reports (report)	February 11, 2010	500	± 4.5%	46%	42%	7%	5%
Research 2000 (report)	March 10, 2010	600	± 4.0%	49%	40%	—	11%
Rasmussen Reports (report)	March 11, 2010	500	± 4.5%	46%	40%	4%	10%
The Field Poll (report)	March 18, 2010	748	± 3.7%	45%	44%	—	11%
PPIC (report)	March 24, 2010	2,002	± 2.0%	44%	43%	—	13%
Rasmussen Reports (report)	April 12, 2010	500	± 4.5%	42%	38%	7%	13%
Rasmussen Reports (report)	May 12, 2010	500	± 4.5%	45%	38%	4%	12%
PPIC (report)	May 9–16, 2010	2,003	± 2.0%	48%	39%	—	13%
Research 2000 (report)	May 17–19, 2010	600	± 4.0%	48%	39%	—	—
Los Angeles Times (report)	May 19–26, 2010	—	—	44%	38%	—	—
Public Policy Polling (report)	May 21–23, 2010	921	± 3.2%	45%	42%	—	13%
Rasmussen Reports (report)	June 9, 2010	500	± 4.5%	48%	43%	5%	5%
Reuters (report)	June 30, 2010	600	± 4.5%	45%	41%	1%	13%
Survey USA (report)	July 8–11, 2010	614	± 4.0%	45%	47%	3%	5%
Rasmussen Reports (report)	July 12, 2010	500	± 4.5%	49%	42%	4%	5%
Public Policy Polling (report)	July 23–25, 2010	614	± 3.95%	49%	40%	—	11%
Rasmussen Reports (report)	August 3, 2010	750	± 4.0%	45%	40%	5%	10%
Survey USA/CBS 5 (report)	August 9–11, 2010	602	± 4.0%	42%	47%	—	11%
Rasmussen Reports (report)	August 24, 2010	750	± 4.0%	44%	43%	5%	8%
Survey USA (report)	August 31 – September 1, 2010	569	± 4.2%	46%	48%	5%	1%
CNN(report)	September 2–7, 2010	866	± 3.5%	48%	44%	5%	3%
Rasmussen Reports (report)	September 6, 2010	750	± 4.0%	42%	47%	—	—
Rasmussen Reports (report)	September 6, 2010	750	± 4.0%	47%	48%	2%	3%
Fox News (report)	September 11, 2010	1,000	± 3.0%	46%	44%	4%	6%
Public Policy Polling (report)	September 14–16, 2010	630	± 3.9%	50%	42%	—	8%
Fox News/Pulse Opinion Research (report)	September 18, 2010	1,000	± 3.0%	47%	46%	3%	4%
Rasmussen Reports (report)	September 20, 2010	750	± 4.0%	47%	43%	4%	6%
Survey USA (report)	September 19–21, 2010	610	± 4.0%	49%	43%	6%	2%
CNN/Time/Opinion Research Corporation (report)	September 24–28, 2010	786	± 3.5%	52%	43%	3%	2%
PPIC report	September 19–26, 2010	1,104	± 3%	42%	35%	6%	17%
USC poll report	September 27, 2010	1,003	—	39%	34%	—	23%
Rasmussen Reports (report)	October 3, 2010	750	± 4.0%	49%	45%	2%	5%
Angus Reid Public Opinion (report)	October 6, 2010	501	± 4.5%	55%	39%	6%	—
Rasmussen Reports (report)	October 13, 2010	750	± 4.0%	49%	46%	2%	3%
Reuters (report)	October 12–14, 2010	601	± 4.0%	46%	45%	2%	6%
PPIC (report)	October 10–17, 2010	1,067	± 3.5%	43%	38%	6%	13%
Tarrance Group (report)	October 17–19, 2010	—	± 4.1%	44%	44%	6%	5%
USC/LA Times (report)	October 13–20, 2010	878	± 3.2%	50%	42%	4%	4%
Rasmussen Reports (report)	October 21, 2010	750	± 4.0%	48%	46%	3%	3%
Public Policy Polling (report)	October 21–23, 2010	622	± 3.2%	52%	43%	0%	5%
Fox/Pulse Opinion Research (report)	October 23, 2010	1,000	± 3.0%	48%	44%	5%	3%
Suffolk University (report)	October 21–24, 2010	600	± 4.0%	52%	43%	4%	2%
SurveyUSA (report)	October 21–25, 2010	594	± 4.1%	45%	40%	7%	8%
Field Poll (report)	October 14–26, 2010	1,501	± 3.2%	49%	41%	—	10%
CNN/Time/Opinion Research (report)	October 20–26, 2010	1,527	± 2.5%	50%	45%	1%	—
Rasmussen Reports (report)	October 27, 2010	750	± 4.0%	49%	46%	2%	3%
Angus Reid Public Opinion (report)	October 28–29, 2010	485	± 4.5%	51%	44%	5%	—
SurveyUSA (report)	October 26–31, 2010	587	± 4.1%	46%	38%	6%	10%
Public Policy Polling (report)	October 29–31, 2010	882	± 3.3%	50%	46%	—	3%

Hypothetical polling

Poll source	Dates administered	Barbara Boxer	Chuck DeVore
Research 2000	August 9–12, 2009	53%	29%
Rasmussen Reports	September 23, 2009	46%	37%
The Field Poll	September 18 – October 6, 2009	50%	33%
Rasmussen Reports	November 17, 2009	46%	36%
Rasmussen Reports	January 14, 2010	46%	40%
The Field Poll	January 5–17, 2010	51%	34%
PPIC	January 27, 2010	47%	39%
Rasmussen Reports	February 11, 2010	47%	42%
Research 2000	March 10, 2010	49%	39%
Rasmussen Reports	March 11, 2010	46%	40%
Field Research	March 18, 2010	45%	41%
PPIC	March 24, 2010	46%	40%
Rasmussen Reports	April 12, 2010	42%	39%
Rasmussen Reports	May 12, 2010	46%	40%
Public Policy Institute of California (Report)	May 2010	50%	39%
Research 2000	May 17–19, 2010	47%	38%
Public Policy Polling	May 21–23, 2010	46%	40%
USC/Los Angeles Times (Report)	May 19–26, 2010	46%	36%

Poll source	Dates administered	Barbara Boxer	Tom Campbell
Rasmussen Reports	January 14, 2010	46%	42%
The Field Poll	January 5–17, 2010	48%	38%
PPIC	January 27, 2010	45%	41%
Rasmussen Reports	February 11, 2010	45%	41%
Research 2000	March 10, 2010	47%	43%
Rasmussen Reports	March 11, 2010	43%	41%
Field Research	March 18, 2010	43%	44%
PPIC	March 24, 2010	43%	44%
Rasmussen Reports	April 12, 2010	42%	41%
Rasmussen Reports	May 12, 2010	42%	41%
Public Policy Institute of California (Report)	May 2010	46%	40%
Research 2000	May 17–19, 2010	47%	40%
Public Policy Polling	May 21–23, 2010	47%	40%
USC/Los Angeles Times (Report)	May 19–26, 2010	38%	45%

=== Fundraising ===
Candidate (party)	Receipts	Disbursements	Cash on hand	Debt
Barbara Boxer (D)	$20,314,189	$22,178,746	$2,271,034	$0
Carly Fiorina (R)	$17,935,605	$16,664,055	$1,271,550	$805,844
Jerry Carroll (I)	$140	$140	$10	$1,305
Marsha Feinland (P&F)	$0	$0	$0	$0
Neil Goldberg (I)	$0	$0	$0	$0
Gail Lightfoot (L)	$0	$0	$0	$0
Edward Noonan (AI)	$0	$0	$0	$0
Duane Roberts (G)	$0	$0	$0	$12,562
Source: Federal Election Commission (FEC) (Note that some candidates filed with the FEC, but did not pursue their candidacy.)

=== Results ===
Despite the last poll before the election showing Fiorina only trailing by 4 points, on election night Boxer defeated Fiorina by a ten-point margin, and around a one million vote majority. Boxer performed extremely well in Los Angeles County, and the San Francisco Bay Area. Boxer was declared the winner shortly after the polls closed. Fiorina conceded defeat to Boxer at 11:38 P.M.

United States Senate election in California, 2010
Party	Candidate	Votes	%	±%
Democratic	Barbara Boxer (incumbent)	5,218,137	52.18%	−5.53%
Republican	Carly Fiorina	4,217,386	42.17%	+4.37%
Libertarian	Gail Lightfoot	175,235	1.75%	−0.05%
Peace and Freedom	Marsha Feinland	135,088	1.35%	−0.67%
Green	Duane Roberts	128,512	1.29%	N/A
American Independent	Edward Noonan	125,435	1.25%	+0.58%
Write-in		67	0.00%	±0.00%
Total votes		9,999,860	100.0%	
Democratic hold				

==== By county ====
Results from the Secretary of State of California.

County	Boxer	Votes	Fiorina	Votes	Noonan	Votes	Roberts	Votes	Lightfoot	Votes	Feinland	Votes
Alameda	73.9%	338,632	22.1%	100,989	0.7%	3,362	1.3%	5,560	1.1%	5,334	0.9%	4,537
Alpine	50.9%	282	44.0%	244	0.7%	4	0.7%	4	2.5%	14	1.2%	7
Amador	31.9%	5,137	59.6%	9,617	2.3%	364	1.2%	209	3.0%	480	2.0%	334
Butte	37.0%	27,827	54.5%	40,958	1.8%	1,393	1.9%	1,435	2.9%	2,181	1.9%	1,456
Calaveras	32.1%	6,294	58.6%	11,495	3.0%	593	1.6%	326	3.1%	617	1.6%	324
Colusa	30.3%	1,567	63.4%	3,288	1.4%	76	1.2%	67	2.2%	109	1.5%	81
Contra Costa	59.8%	206,270	35.9%	123,934	1.0%	3,492	1.0%	3,607	1.4%	4,996	0.9%	3,181
Del Norte	39.4%	3,212	52.0%	4,240	2.1%	177	1.8%	154	3.0%	245	1.7%	139
El Dorado	32.7%	25,085	61.0%	46,771	1.3%	1,043	1.1%	910	2.4%	1,822	1.5%	1,129
Fresno	37.5%	74,705	57.0%	113,583	1.3%	2,633	1.2%	2,431	1.5%	3,067	1.5%	3,079
Glenn	25.5%	2,020	66.3%	5,257	2.1%	174	1.6%	128	2.7%	208	1.8%	143
Humboldt	54.6%	27,081	37.6%	18,659	0.8%	420	3.2%	1,574	2.5%	1,284	1.3%	653
Imperial	55.6%	14,802	37.2%	9,887	1.2%	341	1.9%	516	1.9%	511	2.2%	570
Inyo	33.8%	2,353	56.2%	3,909	2.4%	169	1.7%	120	3.5%	241	2.4%	170
Kern	30.0%	51,364	62.0%	106,448	1.9%	3,302	1.4%	2,435	2.6%	4,522	2.1%	3,641
Kings	30.0%	7,816	62.7%	16,362	2.2%	560	1.1%	309	1.9%	520	2.1%	542
Lake	49.0%	10,265	40.8%	8,534	2.8%	585	2.4%	505	3.0%	625	2.0%	440
Lassen	24.0%	2,200	66.7%	6,127	1.6%	155	1.7%	157	4.0%	374	2.0%	185
Los Angeles	62.3%	1,432,450	32.6%	749,353	1.0%	23,198	1.2%	29,323	1.5%	33,431	1.4%	32,168
Madera	30.3%	10,308	62.9%	21,413	1.7%	601	1.3%	462	1.9%	632	1.9%	630
Marin	69.3%	78,236	27.5%	31,001	0.6%	756	0.9%	982	1.1%	1,237	0.6%	710
Mariposa	31.8%	2,593	60.4%	4,939	1.9%	158	1.7%	147	2.8%	223	1.4%	118
Mendocino	61.6%	19,422	29.9%	9,426	2.0%	643	2.8%	867	2.3%	749	1.4%	472
Merced	40.2%	19,058	53.4%	25,280	1.7%	827	1.2%	576	1.8%	854	1.7%	831
Modoc	20.9%	787	70.6%	2,666	2.2%	84	1.4%	56	3.1%	116	1.8%	68
Mono	43.5%	1,155	50.1%	1,455	1.7%	154	1.5%	81	2.1%	76	1.1%	556
Monterey	59.1%	58,574	35.0%	34,721	1.1%	1,182	1.3%	1,315	2.0%	1,914	1.5%	1,497
Napa	56.2%	26,194	38.1%	17,743	1.4%	658	1.5%	732	1.8%	836	1.0%	511
Nevada	40.9%	18,504	52.7%	23,875	0.6%	310	1.8%	860	3.1%	1,367	0.9%	424
Orange	37.1%	323,477	57.7%	502,756	1.1%	10,432	1.1%	10,137	1.7%	14,625	1.3%	10,904
Placer	33.6%	47,331	60.2%	84,905	1.5%	2,142	1.0%	1,518	2.2%	3,239	1.5%	2,132
Plumas	32.1%	2,934	60.3%	5,521	1.7%	161	1.4%	131	2.8%	257	1.7%	160
Riverside	40.7%	195,418	53.2%	255,738	1.6%	8,117	1.2%	6,046	1.8%	8,321	1.5%	7,404
Sacramento	50.4%	210,164	43.5%	181,300	1.6%	6,833	1.1%	4,981	2.1%	8,667	1.3%	5,560
San Benito	49.7%	7,909	43.8%	6,977	1.3%	215	1.1%	191	2.2%	337	1.9%	307
San Bernardino	42.7%	185,164	49.9%	216,441	1.8%	8,111	1.4%	6,302	2.4%	10,424	1.8%	7,926
San Diego	43.5%	389,806	50.7%	454,301	1.3%	11,725	1.3%	11,808	1.8%	16,578	1.4%	12,585
San Francisco	80.0%	213,252	16.2%	43,108	0.6%	1,630	1.5%	3,863	1.0%	2,780	0.7%	1,937
San Joaquin	44.5%	70,031	48.5%	76,342	1.6%	2,608	1.3%	2,122	2.1%	3,358	2.0%	3,175
San Luis Obispo	42.8%	44,799	51.2%	53,695	1.2%	1,347	1.1%	1,250	2.5%	2,521	1.2%	1,293
San Mateo	66.5%	146,537	29.9%	65,803	0.8%	1,866	1.0%	2,208	1.2%	2,605	0.6%	1,480
Santa Barbara	49.8%	64,771	45.2%	58,817	1.0%	1,425	1.0%	1,432	1.8%	2,243	1.2%	1,578
Santa Clara	63.3%	320,734	32.0%	161,986	1.0%	5,105	1.1%	5,711	1.6%	8,148	1.0%	5,295
Santa Cruz	68.6%	65,049	25.4%	24,065	0.9%	923	1.6%	1,579	2.2%	2,048	2.3%	1,257
Shasta	26.4%	17,204	66.1%	43,056	2.0%	1,266	1.3%	902	2.6%	1,683	1.6%	1,060
Sierra	29.1%	529	62.3%	1,135	2.4%	45	1.4%	27	2.8%	51	2.0%	37
Siskiyou	33.7%	6,132	57.2%	10,430	2.2%	405	1.4%	270	3.6%	648	1.9%	360
Solano	55.1%	64,658	39.2%	45,995	1.3%	1,600	1.2%	1,429	2.0%	2,289	1.2%	1,460
Sonoma	64.3%	116,996	29.5%	53,678	1.4%	2,686	1.5%	2,806	2.1%	3,720	1.2%	2,281
Stanislaus	39.6%	47,158	53.6%	63,814	1.6%	2,007	1.5%	1,789	2.0%	2,455	1.7%	2,029
Sutter	31.9%	8,121	61.2%	15,606	1.9%	487	1.1%	292	2.4%	607	1.5%	408
Tehama	26.6%	5,352	64.3%	12,950	2.6%	524	1.5%	321	3.1%	622	1.9%	397
Trinity	37.1%	2,029	51.4%	2,813	2.0%	112	3.5%	192	4.4%	242	1.6%	90
Tulare	30.6%	24,742	62.9%	50,856	1.5%	1,264	1.1%	921	1.8%	1,509	2.1%	1,625
Tuolumne	33.4%	7,430	58.6%	13,057	2.6%	576	1.6%	359	2.5%	564	1.3%	304
Ventura	44.8%	115,337	49.9%	128,619	1.3%	3,394	1.1%	3,095	1.8%	4,586	1.1	2,965
Yolo	59.0%	34,925	35.9%	21,263	1.1%	683	1.2%	764	1.7%	973	1.1%	677
Yuba	32.4%	5,212	58.6%	9,452	2.4%	394	1.4%	231	3.3%	536	1.9%	210

Counties that flipped from Democratic to Republican

- Merced (largest community: Merced)
- Mono (largest municipality: Mammoth Lakes)
- San Luis Obispo (largest town: San Luis Obispo)
- San Bernardino (largest town: San Bernardino)
- San Diego (largest community: San Diego)
- San Joaquin (largest city: Stockton)

==== By congressional district ====
Boxer won 33 of 53 congressional districts, with the remaining 20 going to Fiorina, including one that elected a Democrat.

District	Boxer	Fiorina	Representative
1st	57%	36%	Mike Thompson
2nd	32%	60%	Wally Herger
3rd	41%	53%	Dan Lungren
4th	34%	60%	Tom McClintock
5th	62%	31%	Doris Matsui
6th	67%	28%	Lynn Woolsey
7th	65%	29%	George Miller
8th	81%	15%	Nancy Pelosi
9th	85%	12%	Barbara Lee
10th	56%	39%	John Garamendi
11th	44%	51%	Jerry McNerney
12th	68%	28%	Jackie Speier
13th	69%	26%	Pete Stark
14th	65%	30%	Anna Eshoo
15th	62%	33%	Mike Honda
16th	64%	31%	Zoe Lofgren
17th	63%	31%	Sam Farr
18th	48%	45%	Dennis Cardoza
19th	34%	59%	George Radanovich (111th Congress)
19th	34%	59%	Jeff Denham (112th Congress)
20th	48%	43%	Jim Costa
21st	30%	64%	Devin Nunes
22nd	29%	64%	Kevin McCarthy
23rd	56%	38%	Lois Capps
24th	40%	55%	Elton Gallegly
25th	39%	54%	Buck McKeon
26th	42%	53%	David Dreier
27th	58%	37%	Brad Sherman
28th	70%	25%	Howard Berman
29th	61%	35%	Adam Schiff
30th	63%	34%	Henry Waxman
31st	78%	16%	Xavier Becerra
32nd	64%	30%	Judy Chu
33rd	83%	13%	Diane Watson (111th Congress)
33rd	83%	13%	Karen Bass (112th Congress)
34th	71%	23%	Lucille Roybal-Allard
35th	79%	16%	Maxine Waters
36th	56%	39%	Jane Harman
37th	74%	21%	Laura Richardson
38th	67%	26%	Grace Napolitano
39th	60%	34%	Linda Sánchez
40th	37%	57%	Ed Royce
41st	35%	57%	Jerry Lewis
42nd	34%	61%	Gary Miller
43rd	60%	32%	Joe Baca
44th	39%	55%	Ken Calvert
45th	42%	52%	Mary Bono
46th	38%	56%	Dana Rohrabacher
47th	56%	37%	Loretta Sanchez
48th	36%	59%	John B. T. Campbell III
49th	34%	59%	Darrell Issa
50th	40%	55%	Brian Bilbray
51st	56%	37%	Bob Filner
52nd	35%	59%	Duncan L. Hunter
53rd	58%	36%	Susan Davis
