= Loni Hancock =

American politician (born 1940)

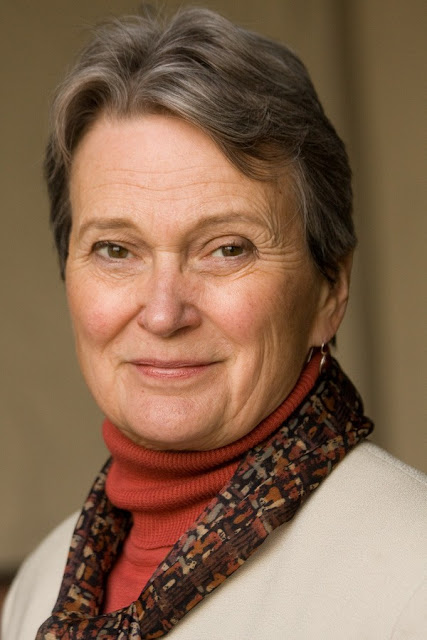

Member of the California State Senate from the 9th district
- In office December 1, 2008 – November 30, 2016
- Preceded by: Don Perata
- Succeeded by: Nancy Skinner

Member of the California State Assembly from the 14th district
- In office December 2, 2002 – November 30, 2008
- Preceded by: Dion Aroner
- Succeeded by: Nancy Skinner

18th Mayor of Berkeley
- In office 1986–1994
- Preceded by: Gus Newport
- Succeeded by: Jeffrey Shattuck Leiter

Personal details
- Born: Ilona Harrington; April 10, 1940 (age 86) Chicago, Illinois, U.S.
- Party: Democratic
- Spouse: Tom Bates
- Children: 4
- Education: Ithaca College (BA); Wright Institute (MA)
- Profession: Federal education administrator

Loni Hancock (born Ilona Harrington; April 10, 1940) is an American politician and a former member of the California State Senate. A Democrat, she represented the 9th Senate District, which encompasses the northern East Bay.

Hancock has been a fixture of East Bay politics for decades, and has lived in Berkeley since 1964. Before her election to the State Senate in 2008, she served in the California State Assembly, representing the 14th Assembly District. She was also the second female (first elected female) Mayor of Berkeley and served in the administrations of Presidents Jimmy Carter and Bill Clinton.

== Early life ==
Ilona Harrington, known as Loni for short, was born in Chicago, Illinois on April 10, 1940. She grew up in New York City, the daughter of two Unitarian ministers. Her father, Donald Harrington, was the state Chairman of the Liberal Party of New York and a 1966 candidate for Lieutenant Governor of New York. She received her Bachelor of Arts from Ithaca College, and a Masters of Arts from the Wright Institute.

== Berkeley City Council Member and Mayor ==
Hancock served Berkeley as a member of the Berkeley City Council from 1971 to 1979. One of Hancock's achievements as a member of the council was the preservation of the Berkeley marina from development. She helped conduct a study by a group of students from the University of California, Berkeley that showed that major development in the marina area would threaten the wildlife in the area.

Hancock was the first woman to be elected the Mayor of Berkeley, California, succeeding Gus Newport in 1986. Serving as mayor for two terms, she balanced seven straight city budgets, forged a historic agreement between the city and the University of California, began the revitalization of downtown Berkeley, led efforts to secure additional open space, launched a Bio-Tech Academy at Berkeley High School (in partnership with Bayer), and managed to repair many potholes in Berkeley streets during a very short period prior to her second election as Mayor.

== Roles in Presidential administrations ==
Senator Hancock also served as President Jimmy Carter's Regional Director for ACTION, overseeing a host of domestic volunteer programs including VISTA, Foster Grandparents, Senior Companions and Retired Senior Volunteer Program.

In 1994, Hancock left her position as mayor of Berkeley to serve in the administration of President Bill Clinton. Hancock headed the Western Regional Office of the U.S. Department of Education. Working with schools, communities, state and local governments, she helped launch many of Clinton's education initiatives.

== California State Assembly ==
Hancock chaired the Assembly Committee on Natural Resources. She led the committee to pass environmental legislation that protects open space, expands recycling programs, and promotes healthy city-infill strategies in the state. Hancock also chaired the Assembly Select Committee on Bridging the Achievement Gap, which worked to reduce high dropout rates, improve school-to-career programs, and provide oversight of the federal No Child Left Behind Act. In 2007, Governor Schwarzenegger signed legislation authored by Assemblywoman Hancock to greatly expand career technical education programs for high school students.

While in the Assembly, Hancock sat on the Assembly Committee on Rules and chaired the Subcommittee on Sexual Harassment and Violence Prevention, and was a member of the Committee on Education, the Committee on Housing and Community Development, the Budget Committee, and the Budget Subcommittee on Health and Human Services. She worked in her committee positions to help expand health care programs for children, increase funding for foster youth programs, and prevent cuts in Medi-Cal stipends and proposed cuts to programs for seniors and people with disabilities.

In 2005, Hancock authored AB 144, which provided financing for the construction of the new eastern span of the San Francisco-Oakland Bay Bridge. While the western span had undergone extensive repair and retrofitting, the eastern span retained substantial damage from the 1989 Loma Prieta earthquake and its continued use posed a serious safety hazard. After more than a decade of planning and construction, the Bridge's new eastern span opened for public use in 2013.

A strong advocate of campaign finance reform, Hancock authored AB 583, the California Clean Money and Fair Elections Act, to provide full public financing for all statewide races in California. In June 2007, the bill passed the Assembly with 45 votes.

== California State Senate ==
In the 2008 Democratic primary for the 9th Senate District, Hancock defeated former Assemblywoman Wilma Chan for the party nomination by a percentage of 56.5% to Chan's 43.5%. She was overwhelmingly elected to the State Senate with 77.3% of the vote in November. Hancock was sworn in as a State Senator on December 1, 2008.

Hancock is the former Chair of the Senate Public Safety Committee, as well as Senate Budget Subcommittee #5 on Public Safety & Corrections. She previously served as Chair of the Senate Committee on Elections and Constitutional Amendments. She also served as a member of the Senate committees on Education, Governance and Finance, Environmental Quality, Human Services, and Agriculture.

In 2008, Hancock introduced SCA 5, which proposed to change the existing 2/3 supermajority requirement to pass a state budget with a simple majority vote rule. That constitutional amendment eventually became Proposition 25, which was approved by the people of California in the 2010 general election.

Hancock drew national attention in 2011 for her introduction of SB 234, which proposed the imposition of a state sales tax on out-of-state internet companies, like Amazon.com, who sell goods in California. Later that year, the Legislature and Governor Jerry Brown reached a compromise with several internet companies to incorporate many of the provisions of SB 234 in the state budget.

After the 2012 fire at the Chevron Refinery in Richmond, Hancock authored several pieces of legislation aimed at increasing governmental oversight over oil refineries. SB 54 increased the qualification requirements for employees who work at oil refineries. SB 1300 requires oil refinery operators to provide state regulators with vital information whenever an oil refinery undergoes a "turnaround", a shutdown of refinery operations in order to perform repairs or maintenance.

In 2013, Hancock authored and passed SB 260, which provides a parole hearing process for state prisoners who committed their crimes before age 18 and were prosecuted as an adult. In 2015, she authored SB 261, which extended the eligibility for a parole hearing to prisoners who committed their crimes before age 23.

Hancock authored SB 254, The Used Mattress Recovery and Recycling Act, in 2013 with then-Senator Lou Correa. SB 254 created a statewide mattress recycling program, just the third in the country after Connecticut and Rhode Island. The program, known as "Bye Bye Mattress," is administered by CalRecycle, and became operational in early 2016.

After the announcement of the planned construction of a coal export terminal in West Oakland, Hancock introduced several bills in 2016 to attempt to curtail the transport of coal through California. Later that year, Governor Brown signed SB 1279, which prohibits the use of state funds for the construction of new coal transportation projects. In his bill signing message, the Governor remarked that "other localities should follow suit—and the state should, too—to reduce, and ultimately, eliminate the shipment of coal through all California ports."

== Personal life ==
Hancock moved to Berkeley in 1964. Her first husband was Joseph Hancock, a professor of plant pathology at UC Berkeley. She is married to former Mayor of Berkeley and former Assemblymember Tom Bates. She has two children, two stepchildren from Bates's previous marriage, and seven grandchildren.
