= 2006 United States Senate election in California =

- November 7, 2006
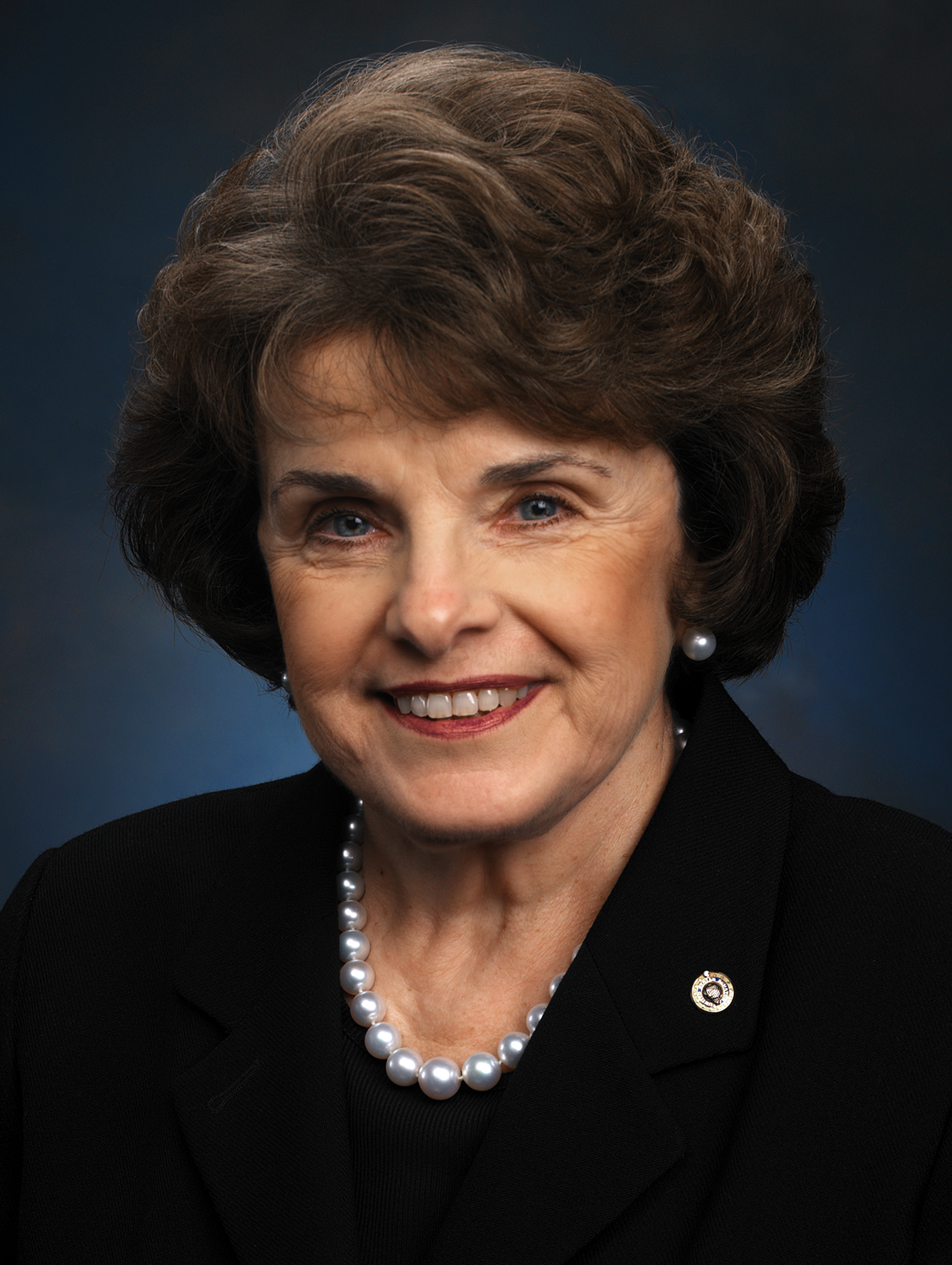

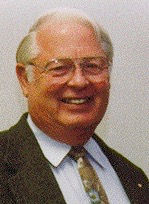
Nominee	Dianne Feinstein	Dick Mountjoy
Party	Democratic	Republican
Popular vote	5,076,289	2,990,822
Percentage	59.43%	35.02%
- Feinstein: 40–50% 50–60% 60–70% 70–80% 80–90% Mountjoy: 40–50% 50–60%
U.S. senator before election
Dianne Feinstein
Democratic
Elected U.S. Senator
Dianne Feinstein
Democratic

The 2006 United States Senate election in California was held November 7, 2006. Incumbent Democratic U.S. Senator Dianne Feinstein won re-election to her third full term.

Feinstein stood against Republican Dick Mountjoy, who had never held a statewide elected position, but had been a state senator for several years. Also running was Libertarian Michael Metti, Don Grundmann of the American Independent Party, Todd Chretien of the Green Party and Marsha Feinland of the Peace and Freedom Party.

Because California is a state that requires a large amount of money to wage a competitive statewide campaign, it is not unusual - as was the case for this race - for a popular incumbent to have no significant opponent. Several prominent Republicans, such as Bill Jones, Matt Fong, and others, declined to run, and a previously announced challenger, businessman Bill Mundell, withdrew his declaration after determining he would not be a self-funded candidate (as Michael Huffington was in the 1994 election). This is the most recent Senate election in California where both major candidates are deceased.

== Primaries ==
Link to primary results

=== Democratic ===
2006 United States Senate Democratic primary, California
Candidate	Votes	%
Dianne Feinstein (Incumbent)	2,176,888	86.95
Colleen Fernald	199,180	7.96
Martin Luther Church	127,301	5.09
Total votes	2,503,369	100.00

=== Green ===
2006 United States Senate Green primary, California
Candidate	Votes	%
Todd Chretien	12,821	46.14
Tian Harter	10,318	37.13
Kent Mesplay	4,649	16.73
Total votes	27,788	100.00

=== Others ===
2006 United States Senate primary, California (Others)
Party	Candidate	Votes	%
Republican	Dick Mountjoy	1,560,472	100.00%
American Independent	Don J. Grundmann	30,787	100.00%
Libertarian	Michael S. Metti	16,742	100.00%
Peace and Freedom	Marsha Feinland	4,109	100.00%

== Candidates ==
=== Democratic Party ===
- Dianne Feinstein, incumbent U.S. Senator, former Mayor of San Francisco

Lost in primary

- Martin Luther Church, retired program manager
- Colleen Fernald, artist and entrepreneur

=== Republican Party ===
- Richard Mountjoy, former State Senator, former State Assemblyman and candidate for Lieutenant Governor in 1998

=== American Independent Party ===
- Don J. Grundmann, chiropractor

=== Green Party ===
- Todd Chretien, writer

Lost in primary

- Tian Harter, green activist and a 1992 Congressional nominee
- Kent Mesplay, environmental activist, air quality inspector, and candidate for president in 2004

=== Libertarian Party ===
- Michael Metti, businessman and perennial candidate

=== Peace and Freedom Party ===
- Marsha Feinland, state party chair, socialist activist, and retired teacher

== General election ==
=== Controversy ===
On September 22, the Los Angeles Times reported that Mountjoy's official biography, as found on his campaign website, falsely asserted that he had served aboard the battleship USS Missouri during the Korean War—he had actually served aboard the heavy cruiser USS Bremerton. A review of the ships' logs corroborated this and the website was quickly changed to reflect his service aboard the Bremerton rather than the Missouri.

I think it was just something that somebody picked up, it didn't come from me.

— Richard Mountjoy

=== Predictions ===
Source	Ranking	As of
The Cook Political Report	Solid D	November 6, 2006
Sabato's Crystal Ball	Safe D	November 6, 2006
Rothenberg Political Report	Safe D	November 6, 2006
Real Clear Politics	Safe D	November 6, 2006

=== Polling ===
Source	Date	Feinstein (D)	Mountjoy (R)
Field Poll	April 19, 2006	59%	31%
Los Angeles Times Poll	May 28, 2006	59%	30%
Field Poll	June 4, 2006	54%	28%
Rasmussen	July 13, 2006	60%	33%
Public Policy	July 26, 2006	42%	21%
Field Poll	August 3, 2006	56%	34%
SurveyUSA	August 28, 2006	56%	34%
Rasmussen	August 31, 2006	56%	34%
Rasmussen	September 12, 2006	58%	35%
Datamar	September 18, 2006	49%	38%
SurveyUSA	September 27, 2006	55%	35%
Los Angeles Times Poll	September 29, 2006	54%	36%
Mason-Dixon	October 2, 2006	53%	23%
Field Poll	October 3, 2006	57%	29%
SurveyUSA	October 26, 2006	59%	33%
Field Poll	November 1, 2006	55%	33%
SurveyUSA	November 5, 2006	60%	31%

=== Results ===
Feinstein won the election easily. She won almost every major populated area, winning in Los Angeles, San Francisco, Sacramento, and San Diego. Feinstein was projected the winner as soon as the polls closed at 11 P.M. EST.

United States Senate election in California, 2006
Party	Candidate	Votes	%
Democratic	Dianne Feinstein (incumbent)	5,076,289	59.43%
Republican	Dick Mountjoy	2,990,822	35.02%
Green	Todd Chretien	147,074	1.72%
Libertarian	Michael S. Metti	133,851	1.57%
Peace and Freedom	Marsha Feinland	117,764	1.38%
American Independent	Don J. Grundmann	75,350	0.88%
Green	Kent Mesplay (write-in)	160	0.00%
Independent	Jeffrey Mackler (write-in)	108	0.00%
Independent	Lea Sherman (write-in)	47	0.00%
Independent	Connor Vlakancic (write-in)	11	0.00%
Invalid or blank votes		357,583	4.19%
Total votes		8,899,059	100.00%
Turnout			53.93
Democratic hold			

==== By county ====
Final results from the Secretary of State of California.

County	Feinstein	Votes	Mountjoy	Votes	Others	Votes
San Francisco	80.54%	187,692	8.31%	19,374	11.15%	25,979
Marin	77.56%	82,025	16.82%	17,788	5.62%	5,946
Alameda	76.07%	307,495	16.46%	66,550	7.46%	30,173
San Mateo	74.80%	152,082	20.19%	41,043	5.02%	10,200
Santa Cruz	72.96%	65,214	19.33%	17,279	7.71%	6,891
Santa Clara	69.84%	298,451	24.89%	106,383	5.27%	22,521
Sonoma	69.50%	119,672	23.01%	39,619	7.49%	12,906
Contra Costa	68.48%	205,516	26.91%	80,764	4.60%	13,818
Los Angeles	67.13%	1,298,820	27.72%	536,200	5.15%	99,646
Monterey	65.28%	56,887	29.15%	25,400	5.57%	4,852
Mendocino	64.50%	19,645	25.16%	7,662	10.34%	3,149
Yolo	64.25%	34,548	30.10%	16,187	5.65%	3,036
Napa	64.05%	27,144	30.58%	12,958	5.37%	2,277
Solano	63.06%	64,828	32.06%	32,956	4.89%	5,025
San Benito	60.74%	8,626	33.58%	4,768	5.68%	807
Imperial	60.02%	13,182	33.41%	7,338	6.57%	1,442
Humboldt	58.07%	27,652	31.51%	15,003	10.42%	4,964
Alpine	57.17%	303	35.47%	188	7.36%	39
Santa Barbara	57.00%	68,970	37.08%	44,864	5.92%	7,157
Sacramento	56.59%	201,221	37.94%	134,887	5.47%	19,447
Lake	56.41%	10,830	34.85%	6,691	8.74%	1,678
San Joaquin	54.71%	75,011	40.02%	54,874	5.27%	7,224
Merced	53.84%	22,081	41.24%	16,914	4.93%	2,021
Ventura	53.22%	115,471	42.12%	91,374	4.66%	10,110
San Diego	53.03%	403,711	42.39%	322,760	4.58%	34,875
Fresno	51.45%	89,331	43.94%	76,286	4.60%	7,993
San Luis Obispo	50.09%	47,891	44.70%	42,742	5.21%	4,977
Nevada	49.98%	21,204	43.88%	18,618	6.14%	2,606
San Bernardino	49.40%	167,821	45.17%	153,430	5.43%	18,442
Trinity	49.39%	2,824	41.20%	2,356	9.41%	538
Stanislaus	49.30%	50,656	46.24%	47,513	4.47%	4,589
Mono	48.98%	1,829	44.38%	1,657	6.64%	248
Riverside	48.54%	183,532	46.43%	175,543	5.03%	19,006
Del Norte	48.11%	3,207	44.33%	2,955	7.56%	504
Butte	47.02%	32,131	45.82%	31,316	7.16%	4,892
Kings	47.02%	10,660	48.59%	11,016	4.40%	997
Tuolumne	45.52%	9,535	48.83%	10,228	5.65%	1,184
Orange	45.13%	321,646	49.66%	353,924	5.21%	37,096
Placer	44.53%	53,956	50.85%	61,615	4.62%	5,594
Plumas	44.36%	3,881	49.66%	4,345	5.98%	523
Amador	44.35%	6,534	50.10%	7,382	5.55%	818
Calaveras	44.33%	7,860	48.74%	8,642	6.92%	1,227
El Dorado	43.25%	28,915	50.99%	34,091	5.76%	3,853
Mariposa	42.98%	3,249	50.83%	3,842	6.19%	468
Madera	42.39%	12,658	52.27%	15,609	5.34%	1,596
Tulare	42.09%	28,694	53.58%	36,526	4.34%	2,956
Inyo	41.41%	2,641	51.44%	3,281	7.15%	456
Siskiyou	41.20%	6,752	51.46%	8,433	7.34%	1,203
Colusa	41.08%	1,994	54.53%	2,647	4.39%	213
Sierra	40.67%	641	51.65%	814	7.68%	121
Yuba	39.94%	5,487	52.82%	7,257	7.24%	994
Sutter	39.48%	9,297	55.69%	13,113	4.83%	1,138
Kern	39.29%	58,330	55.19%	81,944	5.53%	8,205
Tehama	38.70%	6,914	55.22%	9,865	6.08%	1,086
Shasta	37.94%	22,097	56.45%	32,876	5.61%	3,267
Glenn	37.84%	2,813	56.76%	4,219	5.39%	401
Lassen	35.06%	2,968	56.93%	4,820	8.01%	678
Modoc	34.44%	1,264	57.03%	2,093	8.53%	313

Counties that flipped from Republican to Democratic

- Butte (largest city: Chico)
- Del Norte (largest community: Crescent City)
- Mono (largest municipality: Mammoth Lakes)
- Nevada (largest town: Truckee)
- San Luis Obispo (largest town: San Luis Obispo)
- Trinity (largest community: Weaverville)

Counties that flipped from Democratic to Republican

- Kings (largest municipality: Hanford)

==== By congressional district ====
Feinstein won 40 of 53 congressional districts, including six that elected Republicans.

District	Feinstein	Mountjoy	Representative
1st	63%	30%	Mike Thompson
2nd	42%	52%	Wally Herger
3rd	49%	46%	Dan Lungren
4th	44%	50%	John Doolittle
5th	67%	27%	Doris Matsui
6th	73%	20%	Lynn Woolsey
7th	71%	24%	George Miller
8th	80%	8%	Nancy Pelosi
9th	81%	8%	Barbara Lee
10th	66%	30%	Ellen Tauscher
11th	55%	40%	Richard Pombo (109th Congress)
11th	55%	40%	Jerry McNerney (110th Congress)
12th	77%	18%	Tom Lantos
13th	75%	20%	Pete Stark
14th	72%	22%	Anna Eshoo
15th	69%	26%	Mike Honda
16th	70%	25%	Zoe Lofgren
17th	69%	25%	Sam Farr
18th	59%	36%	Dennis Cardoza
19th	47%	49%	George Radanovich
20th	60%	34%	Jim Costa
21st	43%	52%	Devin Nunes
22nd	37%	57%	Bill Thomas (109th Congress)
22nd	37%	57%	Kevin McCarthy (110th Congress)
23rd	62%	32%	Lois Capps
24th	49%	46%	Elton Gallegly
25th	45%	50%	Buck McKeon
26th	48%	47%	David Dreier
27th	63%	31%	Brad Sherman
28th	75%	20%	Howard Berman
29th	64%	31%	Adam Schiff
30th	72%	24%	Henry Waxman
31st	79%	14%	Xavier Becerra
32nd	68%	27%	Hilda Solis
33rd	84%	11%	Diane Watson
34th	74%	21%	Lucille Roybal-Allard
35th	81%	15%	Maxine Waters
36th	63%	31%	Jane Harman
37th	77%	18%	Juanita Millender-McDonald
38th	72%	23%	Grace Napolitano
39th	64%	31%	Linda Sánchez
40th	44%	50%	Ed Royce
41st	44%	51%	Jerry Lewis
42nd	42%	53%	Gary Miller
43rd	65%	30%	Joe Baca
44th	46%	48%	Ken Calvert
45th	51%	45%	Mary Bono
46th	48%	47%	Dana Rohrabacher
47th	59%	34%	Loretta Sanchez
48th	46%	50%	John B. T. Campbell III
49th	42%	53%	Darrell Issa
50th	51%	45%	Brian Bilbray
51st	63%	32%	Bob Filner
52nd	46%	50%	Duncan L. Hunter
53rd	66%	29%	Susan Davis

== See also ==
- 2006 United States Senate elections
