= Marsha Feinland =

American politician

Marsha Feinland (born May 21, 1949) is an American activist and politician.

== Career ==
Feinland was a third-party candidate (Peace and Freedom Party) for President of the United States in the 1996 U.S. presidential election. Her running mate was Kate McClatchy of Massachusetts; they were only on the ballot in California and received 25,332 votes. The Peace and Freedom Party convention had actually voted to run a slate of candidates for the United States Electoral College divided proportionally between the three top candidates for president at the convention, since none had received a majority. The California Secretary of State's office refused to place the names of electors on the ballot and demanded that the party put forward a single name (even though U.S. citizens do not vote directly for president). Feinland was selected by the officers of the party to represent it in the election and McClatchy agreed to be the vice-presidential candidate.

Feinland had served as state party chair for the Peace and Freedom Party from 1994–96, 1998–2000, 2002–04, and has frequently been a candidate for public office. In June 1998, she ran for governor but lost the Peace & Freedom party primary to Gloria La Riva. In September 1998, she ran for the California State Senate against Democratic candidate Don Perata in a special election. This was part of the special election musical chairs of 1998–99. In the 2004 election, Feinland ran for the United States Senate against Barbara Boxer, and received 233,000 votes.

She ran again for U.S. Senator from California in 2006, receiving 117,764 votes, 1.3% of the total.

Feinland was again a candidate for U.S. Senator from California in 2010, receiving 135,088 votes and 1.35% of the vote.

She was a candidate again for U.S. Senator from California in 2012, receiving 54,129 votes and 1.2% of the vote.

She was previously elected to Berkeley's Rent Stabilization Board, and served from 1994 to 1998.

Feinland is currently a member of the Peace and Freedom Party California State Central Committee.

Party political offices
Preceded by Ronald Daniels	Peace and Freedom nominee for President of the United States; 1996	Succeeded by Leonard Peltier
