= 2026 California Superintendent of Public Instruction election =

- June 2, 2026 (first round); November 3, 2026 (runoff)
- Votes counted: 98% as of Nov. 17, 5:01 AM PST

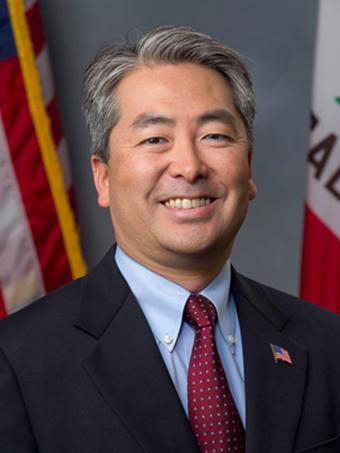

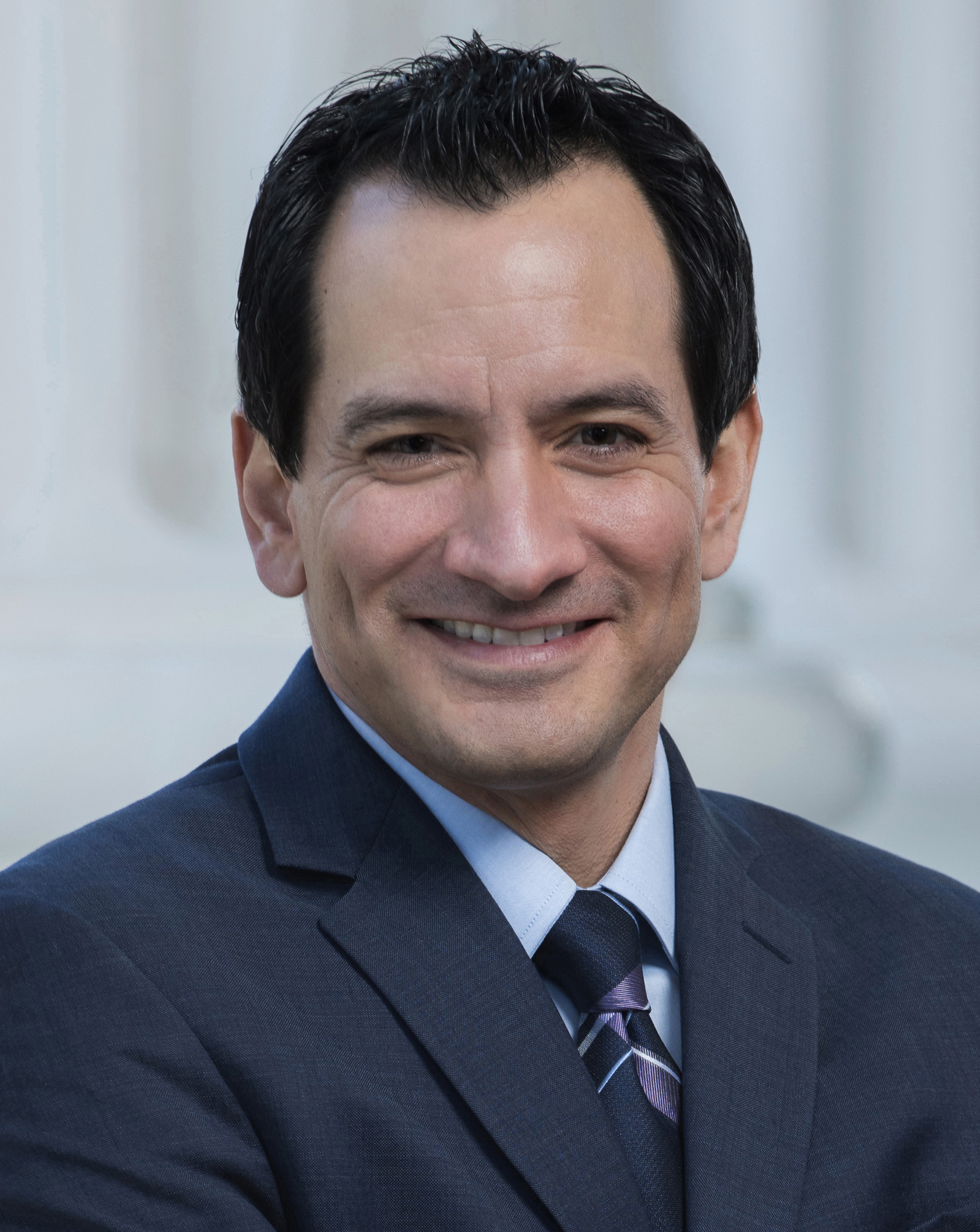

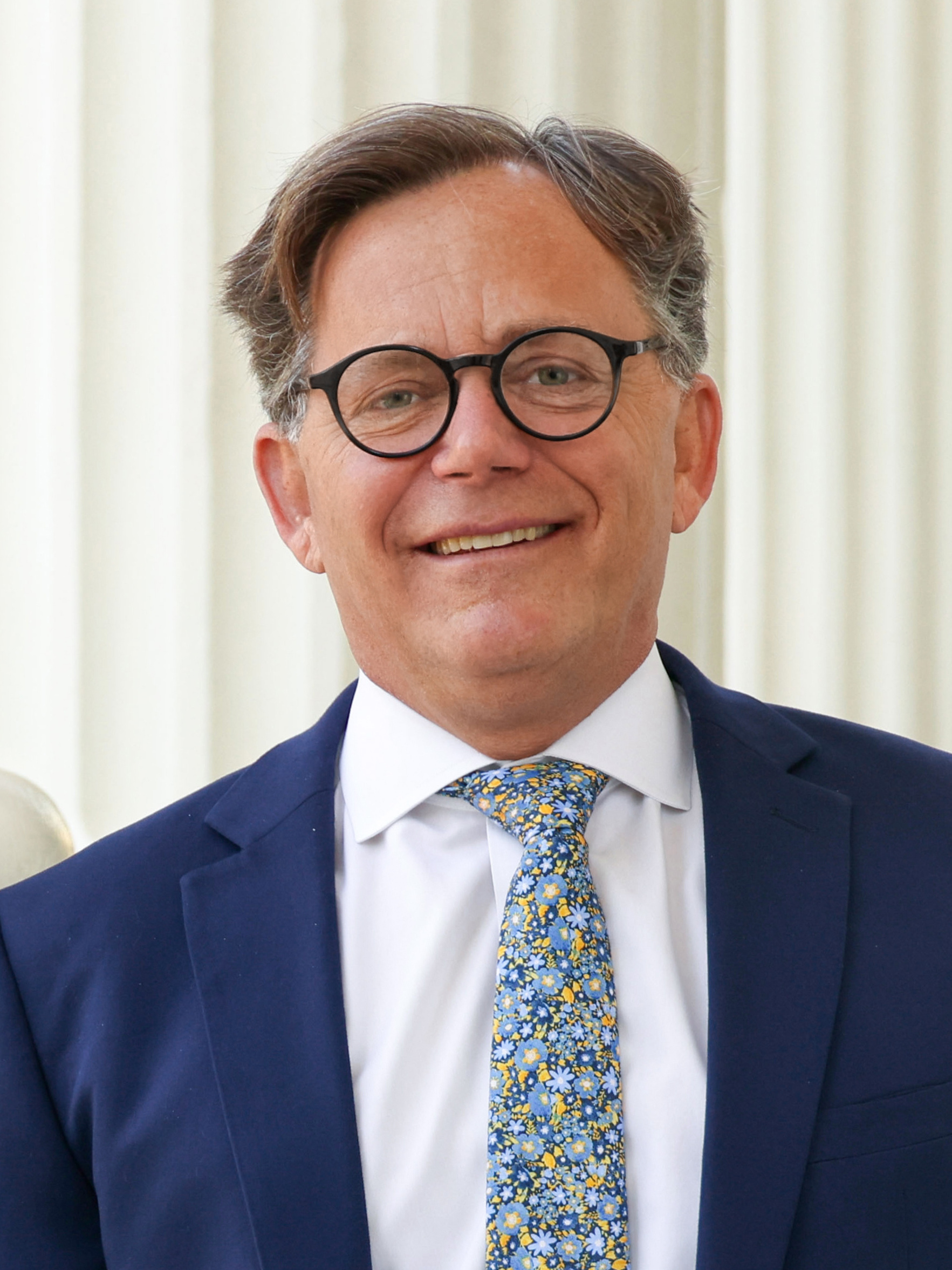

Candidate	Richard Barrera	Sonja Shaw	Nichelle Henderson
First round	1,558,296; 20.3%	1,737,733; 22.6%	738,235; 9.6%
Runoff	6,567,279; 59.0%	4,558,840; 41.0%	Eliminated
Candidate	Wendy Castaneda Leal	Al Muratsuchi	Anthony Rendon
First round	675,996; 8.8%	646,301; 8.4%	624,265; 8.1%
Candidate	Frank Lara	Josh Newman	Ainye Long
First round	578,170; 7.5%	522,757; 6.8%	426,103; 5.6%
- Barrera: 20–30% 30–40% 50–60% 60–70% 70–80% Shaw: 10–20% 20–30% 30–40% 40–50% 50–60% 60–70%
Incumbent Superintendent
Tony Thurmond

The 2026 California Superintendent of Public Instruction election began on June 2, 2026 and concluded on November 3, 2026, to elect the next Superintendent of Public Instruction of California. Unlike most other elections in the state, the office is not elected under the state's top-two primary system. Instead, the officially nonpartisan position is elected at a primary election, with a runoff at a general election if no candidate receives a majority of the vote.

Incumbent Superintendent Tony Thurmond, who was elected in 2018 and reelected in 2022, is term-limited and ran unsuccessfully for governor.

== Candidates ==
The Superintendent of Public Instruction election in California is officially nonpartisan. The parties below identify which party label each candidate would have run under if given the option.

=== Advanced to runoff ===
- Richard Barrera (Democratic), San Diego Unified School District Board member
- Sonja Shaw (Republican), president of the Chino Valley Unified School District board

=== Eliminated in primary ===
- Nichelle Henderson (Democratic), Los Angeles Community College District trustee
- Frank Lara (Peace and Freedom), education union leader
- Wendy Castaneda Leal, superintendent of Semitropic Elementary School District
- Ainye Long, teacher
- Gus Mattammal (Republican), candidate for California's 15th congressional district in 2022, and candidate for California's 23rd State Assembly district in 2024.
- Al Muratsuchi (Democratic), state assemblymember from the 66th district (2012–2014, 2016–present)
- Josh Newman (Democratic), former state senator from the 29th district (2016–2018, 2020–2024)
- Anthony Rendon (Democratic), former Speaker of the California State Assembly (2016–2023) from the 62nd district (2012–2024)

=== Withdrawn ===
- Andra Hoffman (Democratic), Los Angeles Community College District trustee

== Primary election ==
=== Endorsements ===
Richard Barrera (D)

U.S. representatives

- Juan Vargas, CA-52 (2013–present)

State legislators

- Art Torres, former SD-24 (1982–1994)

Labor unions

- California Teachers Association

Newspapers

- McClatchy Media California (Note: The Sacramento Bee, The Modesto Bee, The Fresno Bee, Merced Sun-Star, and The Tribune)
- San Francisco Chronicle
- Sun-Reporter

Organizations

- California Charter Schools Association
Nichelle Henderson (D)

U.S. representatives

- Lateefah Simon, CA-12 (2025–present)

State legislators

- Mia Bonta, AD-18 (2021–present)
- Sade Elhawary, AD-57 (2024–present)

County officials

- Lindsey Horvath, Los Angeles County Supervisor from the 3rd district (2022–present)

Organizations

- Black Women Organized for Political Action PAC
- California Legislative Black Caucus
- California Young Democrats
- Harvey Milk LGBTQ Democratic Club
- Our Revolution
- Stonewall Democrats
Frank Lara (PFP)

Labor unions

- United Educators of San Francisco

Political parties

- Green Party of California
- Peace and Freedom Party
Al Muratsuchi (D)

U.S. representatives

- Ted Lieu, CA-36 (2015–present)

Statewide officials

- Fiona Ma, treasurer of California (2019–present)
- Jack O'Connell, former superintendent of public instruction of California (2003–2011)

State legislators

- Joaquin Arambula, AD-31 (2016–present) (co-endorsement with Rendon)
- Bob Archuleta, SD-30 (2018–present)
- Juan Carrillo, AD-39 (2022–present)
- Damon Connolly, AD-12 (2022–present)
- María Elena Durazo, SD-26 (2018–present)
- Robert Garcia, AD-50 (2024–present)
- Mike Gipson, AD-65 (2014–present)
- Lena Gonzalez, California Senate Majority Leader (2024–present) from SD-33 (2019–present)
- Mark Gonzalez, AD-54 (2024–present)
- Gregg Hart, AD-37 (2022–present)
- Blanca Pacheco, AD-64 (2022–present)
- Robert Rivas, Speaker of the California State Assembly (2023–present) from AD-29 (2018–present)
- Pilar Schiavo, AD-40 (2022–present)
- Jose Solache, AD-62 (2024–present)
- Esmeralda Soria, AD-27 (2022–present)
- Phil Ting, AD-19 (2012–2024)
- Buffy Wicks, AD-14 (2018–present)
- Rick Zbur, AD-51 (2022–present)

Municipal officials

- Janice Hahn, Los Angeles County supervisor from the 4th district (2016–present)

Labor unions

- California Federation of Labor Unions (co-endorsement with Rendon)
- California Federation of Teachers
- California School Employees Association
- International Union of Painters and Allied Trades District Council 36
- Marine Clerks Associates International Longshoremen's Association Local 63

Newspapers

- Bay Area Reporter
Josh Newman (D)

U.S. representatives

- Lou Correa, CA-46 (2017–present)
- Gil Cisneros, CA-31 (2019–2021, 2025–present)
- Mike Levin, CA-49 (2019–present)
- Derek Tran, CA-45 (2025–present)

State legislators

- Angelique Ashby, majority leader of the California Senate (2025–present) from the 8th district (2012-present)
- Dave Cortese, SD-15 (2020–present)
- Susan Eggman, SD-05 (2020–2024)
- Melissa Hurtado, SD-16 (2018–present)
- Mike McGuire, former president pro tempore of the California State Senate (2024-2025) and former majority leader of the California Senate (2022–2024) from the 2nd district (2014-present)
- John Laird, SD-17 (2020–present)
- Cottie Petrie-Norris, AD-73 (2018–present)
- Sharon Quirk-Silva, AD-65 (2012–2014, 2016–present)
- Scott Wilk, SD-21 (2016–2024) (Republican)

Municipal officials

- All 7 members of the Orange Unified School District Board of Education
- Jim Beall, Santa Clara Valley Water District Director from the 4th district (2023–present) and former SD-15 (2012–2020)
- Katrina Foley, Orange County supervisor from the 5th district (2021–present)
- R. Rex Parris, mayor of Lancaster (2008–present) (Republican)

Labor unions

- California Correctional Peace Officers Association
- California Building and Construction Trades Council
Anthony Rendon (D)

U.S. representatives

- Pete Aguilar, CA-33 (2015–present)
- Judy Chu, CA-28 (2009–present)
- Laura Friedman, CA-30 (2025–present)
- Robert Garcia, CA-42 (2023–present)
- Sam Liccardo, CA-16 (2025–present)

Statewide officials

- Eleni Kounalakis, lieutenant governor of California (2019–present)

State legislators

- Joaquin Arambula, AD-31 (2016–present) (co-endorsement with Muratsuchi)
- Sabrina Cervantes, SD-31 (2024–present)
- Eloise Gomez Reyes, SD-29 (2024–present)
- Josh Lowenthal, AD-69 (2022–present)
- Chris Ward, AD-78 (2020–present)

Local officials

- Kevin McCarty, mayor of Sacramento (2024–present)

Individuals

- David Huerta, president of SEIU-USWW (2022–present)

Labor unions

- AFSCME California
- California Faculty Association
- California Federation of Labor Unions (co-endorsement with Muratsuchi)
- International Brotherhood of Electrical Workers
- International Brotherhood of Teamsters California
- Service Employees International Union California
- SEIU United Healthcare Workers West
- United Food and Commercial Workers
Sonja Shaw (R)

Organizations

- Moms for Liberty California
- California Rifle & Pistol Association PAC

Political parties

- California Republican Party

Newspapers

- Southern California News Group (Note: Daily Breeze, Inland Valley Daily Bulletin, Press-Telegram, Los Angeles Daily News, Orange County Register, Pasadena Star-News, Redlands Daily Facts, The Press-Enterprise , The San Bernardino Sun, San Gabriel Valley Tribune, and Whittier Daily News)

=== Results ===
2026 California Superintendent of Public Instruction election
Candidate	Votes	%
Sonja Shaw	1,737,735	22.64
Richard Barrera	1,558,298	20.30
Nichelle M. Henderson	738,236	9.62
Wendy Castaneda Leal	675,968	8.81
Al Muratsuchi	646,329	8.42
Anthony Rendon	624,266	8.13
Frank Lara	578,171	7.53
Josh Newman	522,758	6.81
Ainye Long	426,104	5.55
Gus Mattammal	167,723	2.19
Total votes	7,675,588	100.0

== Runoff ==
=== Endorsements ===
Richard Barrera (D)

Statewide officials

- Jack O'Connell, former superintendent of public instruction of California (2003–2011) (previously endorsed Muratsuchi)

State legislators

- Anthony Rendon, former Speaker of the California State Assembly (2016–2023) from the 62nd district (2012–2024) and former candidate for this seat

Labor unions

- California School Employees Association

Organizations

- Equality California
- Moms Demand Action

Political parties

- California Democratic Party

=== Polling ===
Poll source	Date(s) administered	Sample size (Note: Key: A – all adults RV – registered voters LV – likely voters V – unclear)	Margin of error	Richard Barrera	Sonja Shaw	Undecided
SurveyUSA (Note: Poll sponsored by KGTV and The San Diego Union-Tribune)	October 19–24, 2026	799 (LV)	± 5.3%	34%	25%	41%
SurveyUSA	September 15–20, 2026	742 (LV)	± 4.6%	26%	20%	53%

=== Results ===
2026 California Superintendent of Public Instruction runoff election
Candidate	Votes	%
Richard Barrera	6,567,279	59.0
Sonja Shaw	4,558,840	41.0
Total votes	11,126,119	
