= CCSA =

CCSA may stand for:

- Cab Calloway School of the Arts, a magnet school for grades 6–12 in Delaware
- California Charter Schools Association, an American educational advocacy group
- Canadian Centre on Substance Abuse, Canada's national addictions agency
- Central Collegiate Ski Association, an NCAA college athletic conference
- Certification in control self-assessment, a management certification
- China Communications Standards Association
- Cleveland Council on Soviet Anti-Semitism, an American human rights group
- Clifton School (South Africa)
- Coastal Collegiate Sports Association, an NCAA Division I college athletic conference for swimming, diving and beach-volleyball
- Committee for the Coordination of Statistical Activities, a forum for good practice in statistical activities of international organizations
- Congregatio Canonicorum Sancti Augustini, a German religious community
- Cook County State's Attorney in Illinois, US
- Creative Commons Share Alike, a Creative Commons License for distribution of derivative works
