= Stellar Charter School =

Coordinates: 40.53088°N 122.37262°W

- Redding, California; United States

Information
- Type: Public charter school
- Principal: Heidi Schuller
- Grades: TK–12
- Enrollment: 217
- Color(s): Blue and gold
- Mascot: Stella the Bear
- Website: stellar.reddingschools.net

Stellar Charter School is a K-12 public charter school in Redding, California, United States. The school is part of the Redding Elementary School District. It has an enrollment of 217 students. In September 2007, Stellar Charter was certified by the California Charter Schools Association.

The school used to serve only students from 9th to 12th grade. Years later, the school added middle school classes. Years after that, it added elementary classes and created the Stellar Secondary Charter High School for students in grades 9–12. K-8 go Tuesday and Thursday. 9-12 Go Monday and Wednesday. Friday is a day that is optional, for extra electives. In 2007, its high school students had their first prom. As of 2019, Stellar had an enrollment of 217 students total.
