= 2022 California Superintendent of Public Instruction election =

- June 7, 2022 (first round); November 8, 2022 (runoff)
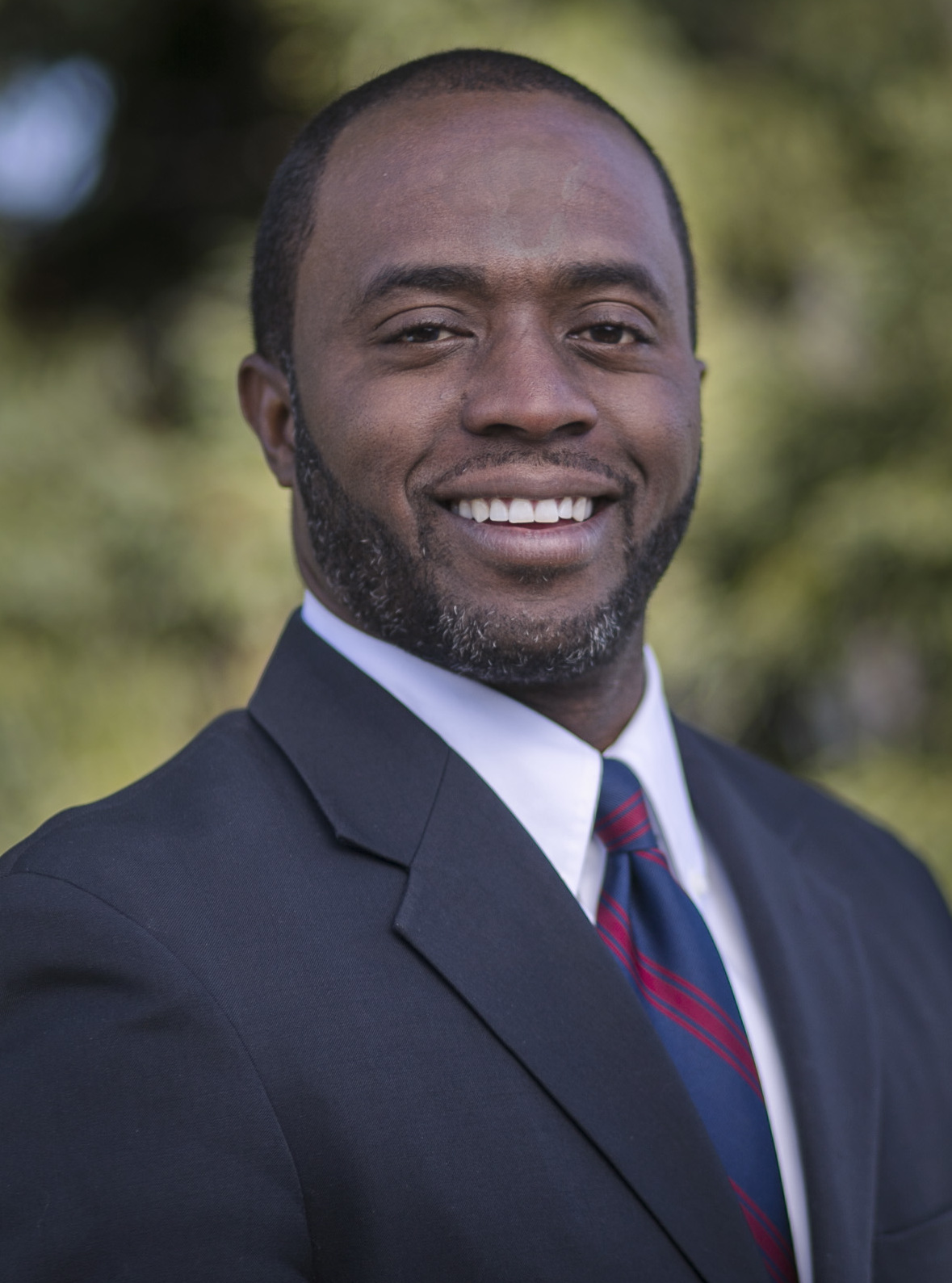

Candidate	Tony Thurmond	Lance Christensen	Ainye E. Long
Primary	2,881,684; 45.90%	745,003; 11.87%	699,331; 11.14%
Runoff	5,681,318; 63.70%	3,237,785; 36.30%	Eliminated
Candidate	George Yang	Marco Amaral	Jim Gibson
Primary	694,073; 11.06%	547,389; 8.72%	468,078; 7.46%
- Thurmond: 20–30% 30–40% 40–50% 50–60% 60–70% 70–80% 80–90% Christensen: 50–60%
SPI before election
Tony Thurmond
Elected SPI
Tony Thurmond

The 2022 California Superintendent of Public Instruction election was held on June 7 and November 8, 2022, to elect the Superintendent of Public Instruction of California. Unlike most other elections in the state, the office is not elected under the state's top-two primary system. Instead, the officially nonpartisan position is elected at a primary election, with a runoff at a general election if no candidate receives a majority of the vote.

Incumbent Superintendent Tony Thurmond, who was endorsed by the California Democratic Party, easily won re-election to a second term, defeating Lance Christensen, who was endorsed by the California Republican Party, by 26 points. He was first elected in 2018 with 50.9% of the vote, narrowly defeating Marshall Tuck in a runoff election. Thurmond's result was by far the best for a Democrat in the 2022 elections, although the race itself was nonpartisan.

== Candidates ==
- Note: The state Superintendent of Public Instruction election in California is officially nonpartisan. The parties below identify which party label each candidate would have run under if given the option.

=== Advanced to runoff ===
- Lance Christensen, education policy executive (Republican)
- Tony Thurmond, incumbent superintendent (Democratic)

=== Eliminated in primary ===
- Marco Amaral, teacher and trustee
- Joseph Guy Campbell, Montessori education publisher
- Jim Gibson, cyber security professional and candidate for mayor of Oceanside in 2016 (Republican)
- Ainye E. Long, public school teacher
- George Yang, software architect and candidate for U.S. Senate in 2016 (Republican)

== Endorsements ==
Marco Amaral

Organizations

- Green Party of California
- Peace and Freedom Party
Lance Christensen

Organizations

- California Republican Party
Tony Thurmond

Organizations

- California Democratic Party
- California Teachers Association
- Equality California
- NARAL Pro-Choice California
- Sierra Club
- Stonewall Democrats

== Primary election ==
=== Results ===
2022 California Superintendent of Public Instruction election
Candidate	Votes	%
Tony Thurmond (incumbent)	2,881,684	45.90%
Lance Christensen	745,003	11.87%
Ainye E. Long	699,331	11.14%
George Yang	694,073	11.06%
Marco Amaral	547,389	8.72%
Jim Gibson	468,078	7.46%
Joseph Guy Campbell	241,984	3.85%
Total votes	6,277,542	100.00%

== Runoff ==
=== Polling ===
Poll source	Date(s) administered	Sample size (Note: Key: A – all adults RV – registered voters LV – likely voters V – unclear)	Margin of error	Tony Thurmond	Lance Christensen	Undecided
USC	October 30 – November 2, 2022	802 (RV)	± 3.5%	64%	36%	–

=== Results ===
2022 California Superintendent of Public Instruction runoff election
Candidate	Votes	%
Tony Thurmond (incumbent)	5,681,318	63.70%
Lance Christensen	3,237,785	36.30%
Total votes	8,919,103	100.00%

==== By county ====
County	Tony Thurmond Democratic		Lance Christensen Republican		Margin		Total votes cast
County	#	%	#	%	#	%	Total votes cast
Alameda	323,921	78.36%	89,475	21.64%	234,446	56.71%	413,396
Alpine	329	69.12%	147	30.88%	182	38.24%	476
Amador	7,249	48.86%	7,586	51.14%	-337	-2.27%	14,835
Butte	32,987	55.75%	26,178	44.25%	6,809	11.51%	59,165
Calaveras	8,706	52.27%	7,949	47.73%	757	4.55%	12,655
Colusa	2,214	48.77%	2,326	51.23%	-112	-2.47%	4,540
Contra Costa	231,756	69.77%	100,423	30.23%	131,333	39.54%	332,179
Del Norte	3,437	48.62%	3,632	51.38%	-195	-2.76%	7,069
El Dorado	34,736	51.78%	32,349	48.22%	2,387	3.56%	67,085
Fresno	100,697	54.97%	82,501	45.03%	18,196	9.93%	183,198
Glenn	3,033	47.15%	3,400	52.85%	-367	-5.70%	6,433
Humboldt	26,701	69.48%	11,728	30.52%	14,973	38.96%	38,429
Imperial	15,149	57.35%	11,267	42.65%	3,882	14.70%	26,416
Inyo	3,247	55.94%	2,557	44.06%	690	11.89%	5,804
Kern	80,950	49.43%	82,823	50.57%	-1,873	-1.14%	163,773
Kings	10,729	46.68%	12,257	53.32%	-1,528	-6.65%	22,986
Lake	9,879	59.75%	6,656	40.25%	3,223	19.49%	16,535
Lassen	3,216	42.14%	4,416	57.86%	-1,200	-15.72%	7,632
Los Angeles	1,346,639	69.59%	588,457	30.41%	758,182	39.18%	1,935,096
Madera	14,808	47.88%	16,122	52.12%	-1,314	-4.25%	30,390
Marin	76,144	80.79%	18,104	19.21%	58,040	61.58%	94,248
Mariposa	3,336	52.94%	2,966	47.06%	370	5.87%	6,302
Mendocino	17,096	70.92%	7,010	29.08%	10,086	41.84%	24,106
Merced	25,737	54.74%	21,282	45.26%	4,455	9.47%	47,019
Modoc	1,125	40.83%	1,630	59.17%	-505	-18.33%	2,755
Mono	2,175	64.18%	1,214	35.82%	961	28.36%	3,389
Monterey	56,546	65.60%	29,656	34.40%	26,890	31.19%	86,202
Napa	28,146	69.11%	12,583	30.89%	15,563	38.21%	40,729
Nevada	24,450	61.62%	15,231	38.38%	9,219	23.23%	39,681
Orange	428,511	56.10%	335,330	43.90%	93,181	12.20%	763,841
Placer	74,102	49.94%	74,289	50.06%	-187	-0.13%	148,391
Plumas	3,576	51.81%	3,326	48.19%	250	3.62%	6,902
Riverside	260,169	54.38%	218,297	45.62%	41,872	8.75%	478,466
Sacramento	249,570	62.69%	148,512	37.31%	101,058	25.39%	398,082
San Benito	9,526	57.85%	6,941	42.15%	2,585	15.70%	16,467
San Bernardino	201,353	54.25%	169,816	45.75%	31,537	8.50%	371,169
San Diego	498,154	60.36%	327,205	39.64%	170,949	20.71%	825,359
San Francisco	188,928	81.02%	44,269	18.98%	144,659	62.03%	233,197
San Joaquin	88,012	57.86%	64,102	42.14%	23,910	15.72%	152,114
San Luis Obispo	57,120	60.29%	37,629	39.71%	19,491	20.57%	94,749
San Mateo	142,627	72.21%	54,879	27.79%	87,748	44.43%	197,506
Santa Barbara	67,605	63.03%	39,652	36.97%	27,953	26.06%	107,257
Santa Clara	304,175	69.41%	134,034	30.59%	170,141	38.83%	438,209
Santa Cruz	64,916	76.07%	20,421	23.93%	44,495	52.14%	85,337
Shasta	25,462	46.03%	29,849	53.97%	-4,387	-7.93%	55,311
Sierra	642	49.35%	659	50.65%	-17	-1.31%	1,301
Siskiyou	7,408	51.93%	6,857	48.07%	551	3.86%	14,265
Solano	72,099	64.13%	40,329	35.87%	31,770	28.26%	112,428
Sonoma	116,974	75.24%	38,502	24.76%	78,472	50.47%	155,476
Stanislaus	61,689	54.61%	51,283	45.39%	10,406	9.21%	112,972
Sutter	11,285	47.51%	12,468	52.49%	-1,183	-4.98%	23,753
Tehama	7,759	47.40%	8,609	52.60%	-850	-5.19%	16,368
Trinity	2,171	58.87%	1,517	41.13%	654	17.73%	3,688
Tulare	37,808	47.99%	40,983	52.01%	-3,175	-4.03%	78,791
Tuolumne	9,790	53.65%	8,459	46.35%	1,331	7.29%	18,249
Ventura	146,692	61.33%	92,485	38.67%	54,207	22.66%	239,177
Yolo	40,626	71.60%	16,118	28.40%	24,508	43.19%	56,744
Yuba	7,431	45.12%	9,040	54.88%	-1,609	-9.77%	16,471
Totals	5,681,318	63.70%	3,237,785	36.30%	2,443,533	27.40%	8,919,103

==== By congressional district ====
Thurmond won 49 of 52 congressional districts, including nine that elected Republicans. He performed the best in the 11th and 12th districts in the Bay Area, as well as the 30th, 34th and 37th districts in Greater Los Angeles. Conversely, Christensen won the 1st, 20th and 48th districts, performing the best in the 20th one, where Kevin McCarthy gave the Republicans their best performance in the 2022 House election.

District	Thurmond	Christensen	Representative
1st	49%	51%	Doug LaMalfa
2nd	75%	25%	Jared Huffman
3rd	53%	47%	Kevin Kiley
4th	69%	31%	Mike Thompson
5th	52%	48%	Tom McClintock
6th	60%	40%	Ami Bera
7th	68%	32%	Doris Matsui
8th	73%	27%	John Garamendi
9th	57%	43%	Josh Harder
10th	67%	33%	Mark DeSaulnier
11th	82%	18%	Nancy Pelosi
12th	87%	13%	Barbara Lee
13th	55%	45%	John Duarte
14th	69%	31%	Eric Swalwell
15th	72%	28%	Jackie Speier (117th Congress)
15th	72%	28%	Kevin Mullin (118th Congress)
16th	71%	29%	Anna Eshoo
17th	71%	29%	Ro Khanna
18th	64%	36%	Zoe Lofgren
19th	68%	32%	Jimmy Panetta
20th	47%	53%	Kevin McCarthy
21st	56%	44%	Jim Costa
22nd	54%	46%	David Valadao
23rd	52%	48%	Jay Obernolte
24th	64%	36%	Salud Carbajal
25th	56%	44%	Raul Ruiz
26th	61%	39%	Julia Brownley
27th	57%	43%	Mike Garcia
28th	66%	34%	Judy Chu
29th	72%	28%	Tony Cárdenas
30th	77%	23%	Adam Schiff
31st	62%	38%	Grace Napolitano
32nd	71%	29%	Brad Sherman
33rd	58%	42%	Pete Aguilar
34th	78%	22%	Jimmy Gomez
35th	57%	43%	Norma Torres
36th	71%	29%	Ted Lieu
37th	79%	21%	Karen Bass (117th Congress)
37th	79%	21%	Sydney Kamlager-Dove (118th Congress)
38th	62%	38%	Linda Sánchez
39th	60%	40%	Mark Takano
40th	53%	47%	Young Kim
41st	53%	47%	Ken Calvert
42nd	68%	32%	Lucille Roybal-Allard (117th Congress)
42nd	68%	32%	Robert Garcia (118th Congress)
43rd	73%	27%	Maxine Waters
44th	69%	31%	Nanette Barragán
45th	58%	42%	Michelle Steel
46th	62%	38%	Lou Correa
47th	57%	43%	Katie Porter
48th	47%	53%	Darrell Issa
49th	57%	43%	Mike Levin
50th	65%	35%	Scott Peters
51st	64%	36%	Sara Jacobs
52nd	63%	37%	Juan Vargas
