= Priory of St. Wigbert =

Monastery in Thuringia, Germany

Coordinates: 51.141°N 11.002°E

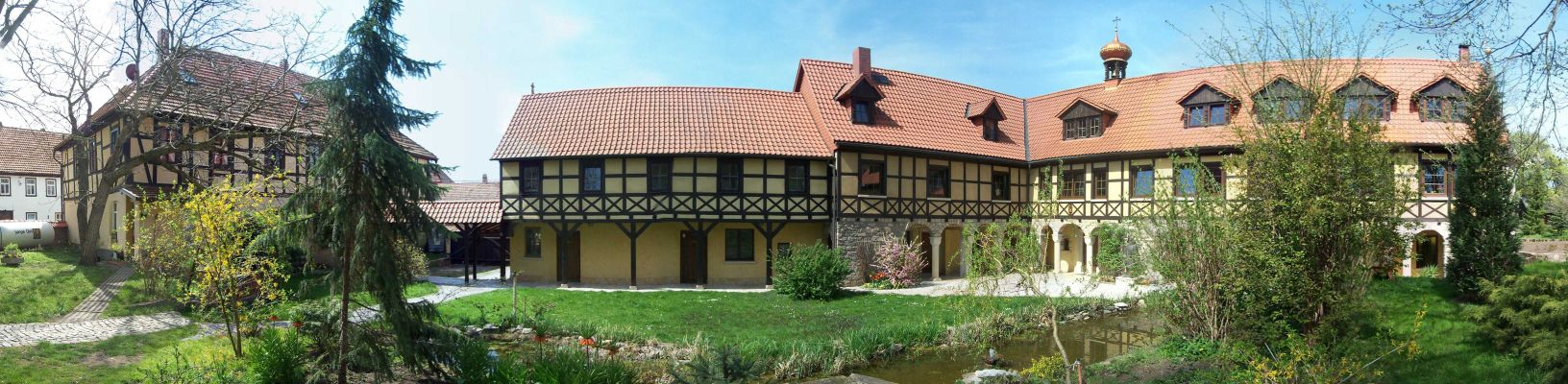
Priory of St. Wigbert

The Priory of St. Wigbert (German: Priorat Sankt Wigberti) is an ecumenical Benedictine monastery for men, named after Saint Wigbert, belonging to the Lutheran Church of Thuringia. It is located in Werningshausen near Erfurt in Germany. This community includes the Congregatio Canonicorum Sancti Augustini.

Brethren in the priory are Lutheran, Roman Catholic and Eastern Orthodox, following the Rule of St Benedict. The prior is the Lutheran pastor Franz Schwarz.

== See also ==
- Östanbäck monastery
- Communität Casteller Ring
