= Richard Barrera =

American politician (born 1966/1967)

California State Superintendent of Public Instruction-elect
- Assuming office January 2027
- Governor: Xavier Becerra (elect)
- Succeeding: Tony Thurmond

Member of the San Diego Unified School Board from District D
- Incumbent
- Assumed office December 8, 2008

Personal details
- Born: 1966 or 1967 (age 59–60)
- Party: Democratic
- Education: University of California, San Diego (BA); Harvard University (MPP)

Richard Barrera (born 1966/1967) is an American Democratic politician who is the state superintendent-elect of California. His father was a Colombian immigrant to the United States. He received a bachelor's in history from the University of California, San Diego and a Master of Public Policy from Harvard Kennedy School.

Political offices
Preceded by Tony Thurmond	California Superintendent of Public Instruction; Taking office 2027	Elect
