= Tony Thurmond =

American politician (born 1968)

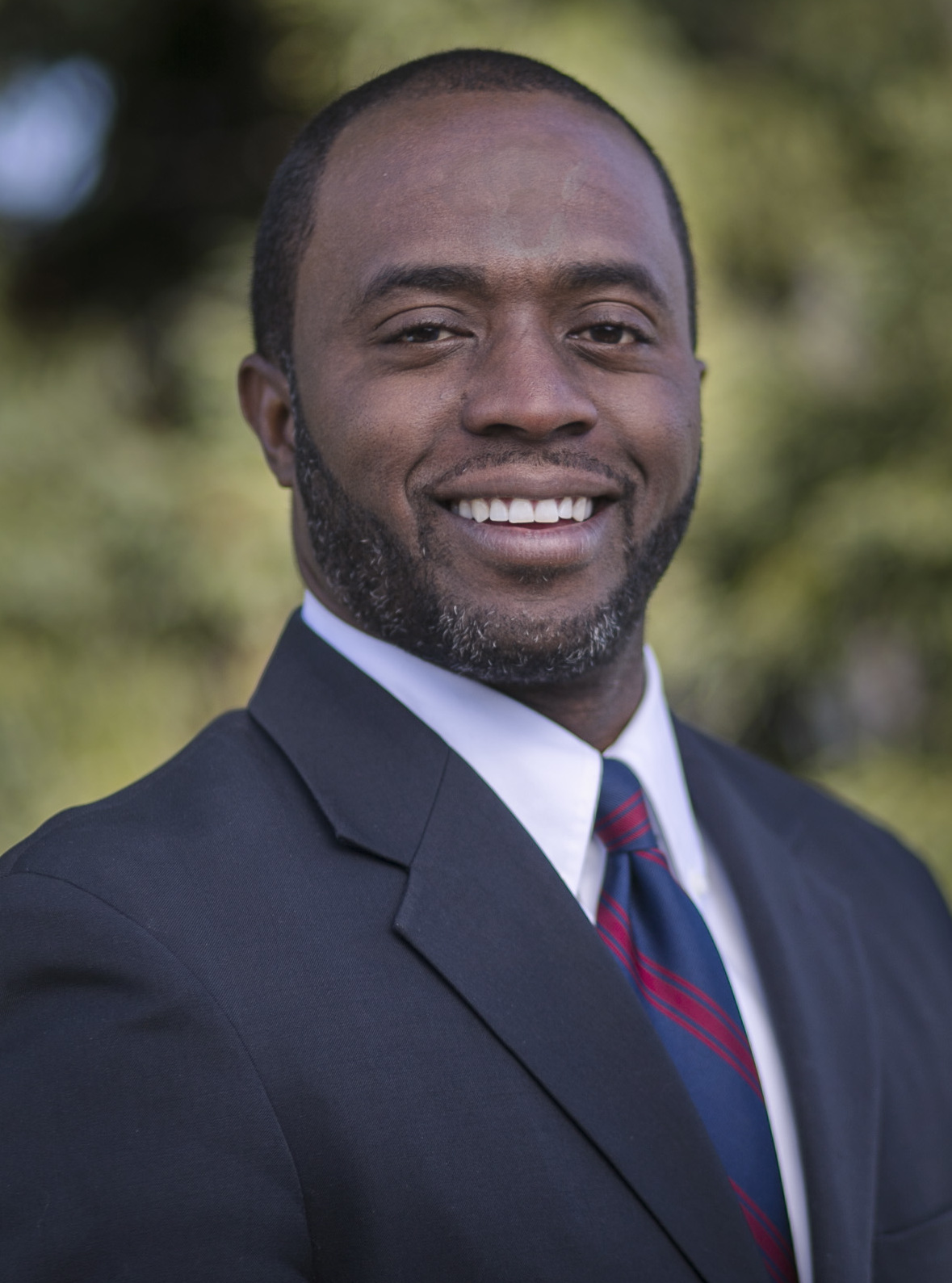
- Official portrait, 2014

28th California Superintendent of Public Instruction
- Incumbent
- Assumed office January 7, 2019
- Governor: Gavin Newsom
- Preceded by: Tom Torlakson

Member of the California State Assembly from the 15th district
- In office December 1, 2014 – November 30, 2018
- Preceded by: Nancy Skinner
- Succeeded by: Buffy Wicks

Personal details
- Born: Tony Krajewski Thurmond; August 21, 1968 (age 57) Monterey, California, U.S.
- Party: Democratic
- Children: 2
- Education: Temple University (BA); Bryn Mawr College (MA, MSW)
- Website: Campaign website

Tony Krajewski Thurmond (born August 21, 1968) is an American politician serving as the 28th California State Superintendent of Public Instruction since 2019. A member of the Democratic Party, he was a member of the California State Assembly from 2014 to 2018.

== Early life and education ==
Thurmond was born on August 21, 1968, in Monterey, California. His mother, an immigrant from Panama, died when he was six years old, and his father did not return after serving in the Vietnam War.

Following his mother’s death, Thurmond and his younger brother moved to Philadelphia where they were raised by cousins they had not previously met. His cousins practiced Hebrew Pentecostalism, a Black religious tradition with roots in the Old Testament, observing Jewish practices such as keeping a kosher home and celebrating the Sabbath and major Jewish holidays. Growing up in poverty, the family relied on public assistance, including free school lunches.

Thurmond attended Temple University, where he served as student body president, and went on to earn dual master’s degrees in law and social policy and social work from Bryn Mawr College.

== Early career ==
In the mid-2000s, Thurmond was the executive director of Beyond Emancipation, a social service agency providing aftercare services to youths leaving the child welfare and juvenile justice systems in Alameda County.

At the Golden Gate Regional Center, he was a program manager leading service provision to individuals with developmental disabilities. In 2012 he served as the Senior Director of Community and Government Relations at Lincoln Child Center.

== Political career ==
Prior to being elected to the Assembly in 2014, he was a member of the Richmond City Council.

Thurmond was a member of the California Legislative Latino Caucus, California Legislative Black Caucus, and California Legislative Jewish Caucus.

Since 2004, Thurmond has pursued seven different elected offices: he ran unsuccessfully for Richmond City Council in 2004, was elected to the Richmond City Council in 2006, lost an election for State Assembly in 2008, won an election to the West Contra Costa School Board in 2008, created an exploratory committee for a potential State Senate campaign in 2009, was elected to the State Assembly in 2014, was re-elected to the State Assembly in 2016, and announced his campaign for State Superintendent in 2017.

=== Legislative record ===
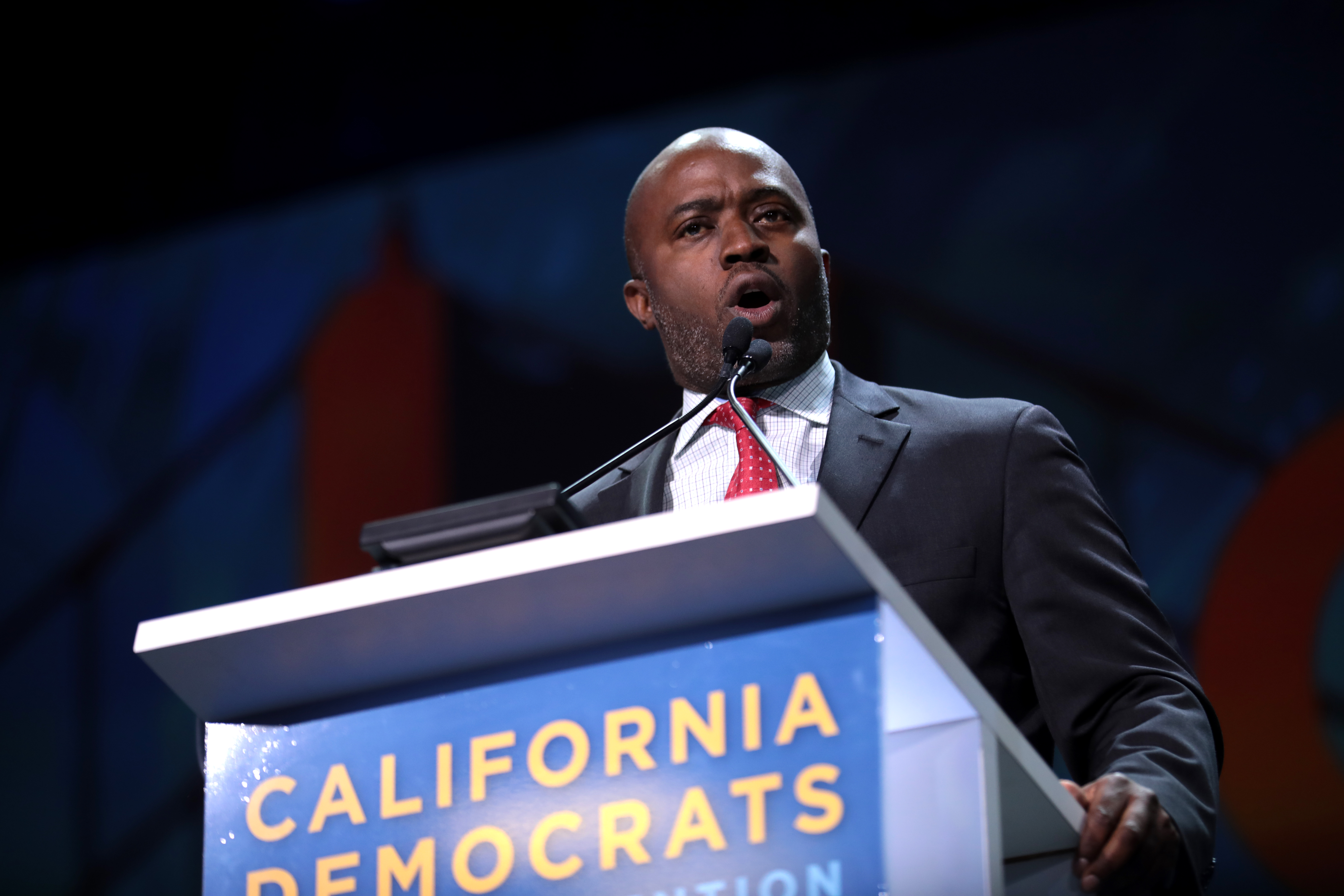
Thurmond speaking at the 2019 California Democratic Party State Convention

Thurmond's bills have adjusted court fine incarceration credits for inflation, required the California Air Resources Board to reduce methane emissions, protected due process rights for immigrant defendants, expanded tobacco restrictions on school property, and shifted funds from the prison system to local school districts to reduce truancy.

On September 15, 2017, Thurmond introduced a resolution in the California State Assembly calling for the Congressional censure of President Donald Trump following his remarks after racially charged events in Charlottesville.

=== State Assembly committees ===
From 2015 to 2016, Thurmond was a member of the following committees:

- Labor and Employment Committee, Chair
- Education Committee
- Health Committee
- Human Services Committee

=== Select committees ===
- Science, Technology, Engineering, and Mathematics Education, Chair
- Status of Boys and Men of Color
- Technical Education and Building a 21st Century Workforce

=== State Superintendent ===
On April 3, 2017, Thurmond launched his campaign for State Superintendent, choosing not to run for re-election for his seat in the State Assembly. His campaign was supported by California's teachers' unions. He won the November 2018 election, beating opponent Marshall Tuck, a Democrat and charter school advocate.

On December 11, 2021, Politico reported that Thurmond had been instrumental in the July 2020 hiring of longtime associate Daniel Lee, "a psychologist, life coach and self-help author", for the position of "superintendent of equity" for the California Department of Education (CDE). Politico reported that the hiring of Lee, a Philadelphia resident up to when the report was published, appeared to violate California's residency requirement for state employees, which allows for few exceptions. The position was never posted publicly, having been initially funded by part of a $700,000 grant by the Hewlett Foundation through the CDE's nonprofit affiliate "Californians Dedicated to Education Foundation" before being funded by California taxpayers, and paid up to a $179,832 salary; the report said Lee's resume showed no prior experience in California or relationships with school districts in the state. On December 14, 2021, Lee resigned from the position.

=== 2026 California gubernatorial campaign ===
On September 26, 2023, Thurmond announced via Twitter his run for governor of California in 2026, however ultimately placed 8th in the primary.

== Personal life ==
Thurmond was introduced to Judaism by his cousins who practiced Hebrew Pentecostalism, and he maintains a connection to Jewish practice and community, guided by Rabbi Rebekah Stern of Congregation Beth El in Berkeley, California. He describes himself as "a convert who’s never been through a formal conversion," and his Jewish identity informs his public service, including his work on Holocaust education and fighting antisemitism in California schools.

Thurmond lives in Richmond, California. He has two daughters.

== Electoral history ==
=== 2014 ===
California's 15th State Assembly district election, 2014
Primary election
Party	Candidate	Votes	%
Democratic	Elizabeth Echols	21,664	31.1
Democratic	Tony Thurmond	16,963	24.4
Democratic	Pamela Price	11,898	17.1
Republican	Rich Kinney	7,531	10.8
Democratic	Sam Kang	4,630	6.7
Democratic	Clarence Hunt	3,329	4.8
Peace and Freedom	Eugene E. Ruyle	2,426	3.5
No party preference	Bernt Rainer Wahl	1,132	1.6
Total votes		69,573	100.0
General election
Democratic	Tony Thurmond	66,661	54.3
Democratic	Elizabeth Echols	56,071	45.7
Total votes		122,732	100.0
Democratic hold			

=== 2016 ===
California's 15th State Assembly district election, 2016
Primary election
Party	Candidate	Votes	%
Democratic	Tony Thurmond (incumbent)	124,136	91.1
Republican	Claire Chiara	12,083	8.9
Total votes		136,219	100.0
General election
Democratic	Tony Thurmond (incumbent)	189,530	89.4
Republican	Claire Chiara	22,528	10.6
Total votes		212,058	100.0
Democratic hold			

=== 2018 ===
2018 Superintendent of Public Instruction election
Party	Candidate	Votes	%
Nonpartisan	Marshall Tuck	2,223,784	37.0
Nonpartisan	Tony Thurmond	2,136,919	35.6
Nonpartisan	Lily Ploski	984,932	16.4
Nonpartisan	Steven Ireland	658,786	11.0
Nonpartisan	Marco Amaral	547,389	8.7
Nonpartisan	Douglas I. Vigil (write-in)	83	0.0
Nonpartisan	Thomas L. Williams (write-in)	66	0.0
Total votes		6,004,570	100.0

Superintendent of Public Instruction runoff election
Party	Candidate	Votes	%
Nonpartisan	Tony Thurmond	5,385,912	50.9
Nonpartisan	Marshall Tuck	5,198,738	49.1
Total votes		10,584,650	100.0

=== 2022 ===
2022 Superintendent of Public Instruction election
Party	Candidate	Votes	%
Nonpartisan	Tony Thurmond (incumbent)	2,881,684	45.9
Nonpartisan	Lance Christensen	745,003	11.9
Nonpartisan	Ainye E. Long	699,331	11.1
Nonpartisan	George Yang	694,073	11.1
Nonpartisan	Marco Amaral	547,389	8.7
Nonpartisan	Jim Gibson	468,078	7.5
Nonpartisan	Joseph Guy Campbell	241,984	3.9
Total votes		6,277,542	100.0

Superintendent of Public Instruction runoff election
Party	Candidate	Votes	%
Nonpartisan	Tony Thurmond (incumbent)	5,681,315	63.7
Nonpartisan	Lance Christensen	3,237,780	36.3
Total votes		8,919,085	100.0

=== 2026 ===
2026 California gubernatorial election
Party	Candidate	Votes	%
Democratic	Xavier Becerra	2,591,857	27.98
Republican	Steve Hilton	2,277,318	24.59
Democratic	Tom Steyer	2,110,707	22.79
Republican	Chad Bianco	941,708	10.17
Democratic	Katie Porter	403,908	4.36
Democratic	Matt Mahan	327,537	3.54
Democratic	Antonio Villaraigosa	104,107	1.12
Democratic	Tony Thurmond	63,762	0.69
Peace and Freedom	Ramsey Robinson	51,803	0.56
Democratic	Betty Yee (withdrawn)	40,873	0.44
Democratic	Eric Swalwell (withdrawn)	28,164	0.30
Republican	Tim Nelson	23,712	0.26
Green	Butch Ware (write-in)	22,493	0.24
Republican	Randeep S. Dhillon	21,937	0.24
Democratic	Barack D. Obama Shaw	16,716	0.18
Democratic	Carolina Buhler	15,013	0.16
Republican	Leo Samuel Zacky	14,708	0.16
Republican	Gretha Solórzano	12,563	0.14
Democratic	Matthew Chase Levy	11,059	0.12
Libertarian	Tom Woodard (withdrawn)	9,328	0.10
Democratic	Erin "Zez" Zezulak	9,251	0.10
Democratic	Louis A. De Barraicua	8,851	0.10
Democratic	Mohammad Arif	8,458	0.09
Republican	Leo Naranjo IV	8,099	0.09
No party preference	Nancy D. Young	7,012	0.08
Republican	James Athans Jr.	6,633	0.07
No party preference	Joseph Cabrera	6,196	0.07
Republican	David Zickefoose	5,882	0.06
Democratic	Satish Rao	5,668	0.06
No party preference	Christine R. Sarmiento	5,643	0.06
No party preference	Jon Henderson	5,589	0.06
Republican	Alicia Olivia Lapp	5,370	0.06
No party preference	Amanda Martin	5,234	0.06
No party preference	Frederic C. Schultz	5,230	0.06
Republican	Rafael M. Hernandez	5,223	0.06
Democratic	Scott P. Shields	5,043	0.05
Democratic	Derek Grasty	4,994	0.05
Democratic	Larry Azevedo	4,675	0.05
No party preference	Elaine Culotti	4,483	0.05
Republican	Patricia De Luca Basualdo	4,064	0.04
No party preference	Mauro Alberto Orozco	4,052	0.04
Democratic	Raji Rab	3,606	0.04
Democratic	Sophia Edum-a-Sam	3,550	0.04
No party preference	Brent Maupin	3,132	0.03
Democratic	Akinyemi Agbede	3,037	0.03
No party preference	Lewis Herms	2,995	0.03
No party preference	Naomi Bar-Lev	2,744	0.03
No party preference	Daniel Mercuri	2,667	0.03
Republican	Ché Ahn (write-in)	2,419	0.03
Democratic	Gary Howard Kidgell	2,415	0.03
Democratic	Joel E. Jacob	2,350	0.03
Democratic	Thunder Parley	2,320	0.03
No party preference	Margaret Trowe	2,286	0.02
No party preference	LivingForGod AndCountry DeMott	2,206	0.02
No party preference	Reza Safarnejad	1,990	0.02
No party preference	Duane Terrence Loynes Jr.	1,905	0.02
No party preference	Don J. Grundmann	1,903	0.02
No party preference	Anne Komarovsk	1,535	0.02
No party preference	Dawit Kellel	1,360	0.01
No party preference	Sam Sandak	1,222	0.01
No party preference	Max Fomin	842	0.01
No party preference	Lukasz Adam Filinski	527	0.01
No party preference	Serge Fiankan	488	0.01
No party preference	Sean Forbes (write-in)	22	0.00
Democratic	Jibri J. Peavy (write-in)	10	0.00
No party preference	Dirk Langer (write-in)	8	0.00
Democratic	Kalid Meky (write-in)	5	0.00
No party preference	Michael J. Dilger (write-in)	1	0.00
Total votes		9,262,468	100.00

Political offices
Preceded by Tom Torlakson	California Superintendent of Public Instruction; 2019–present	Incumbent
