= 2018 California Superintendent of Public Instruction election =

- June 5, 2018 (first round); November 6, 2018 (runoff)
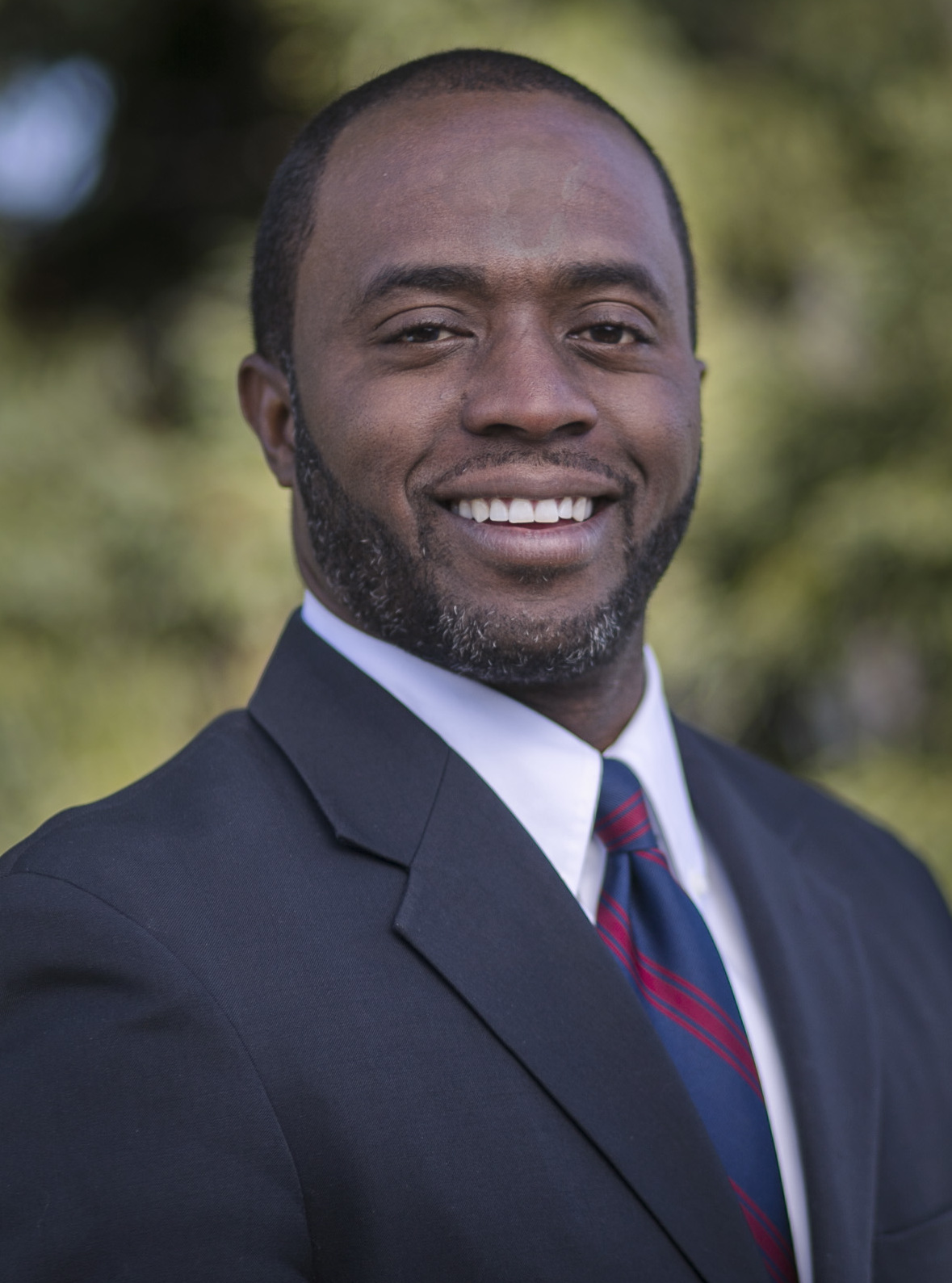

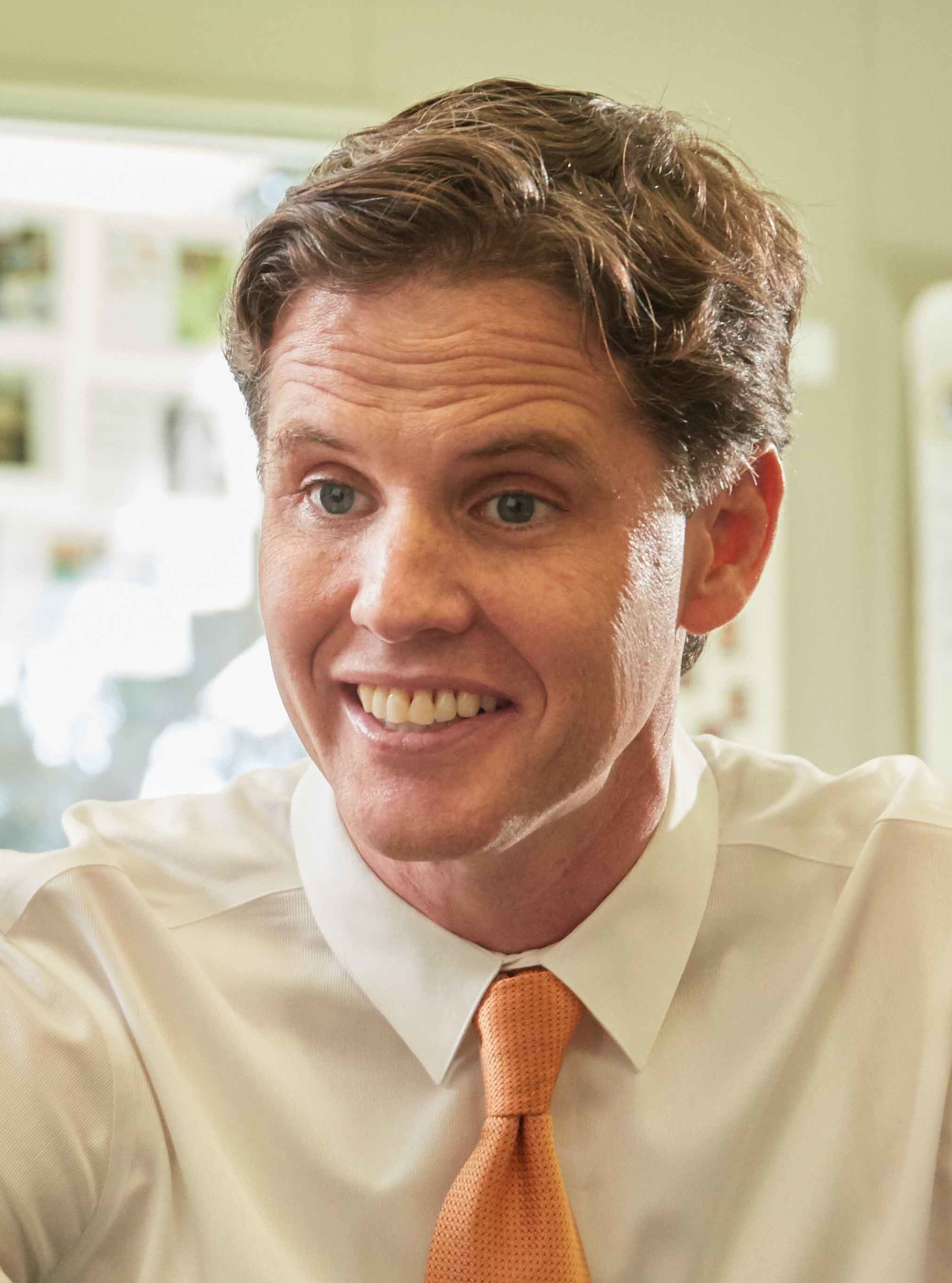
			150x150x
Candidate	Tony Thurmond	Marshall Tuck
Primary	2,136,919; 35.59%	2,223,784; 37.03%
Runoff	5,385,912; 50.88%	5,198,738; 49.12%
		150x150x
Candidate	Lily Ploski	Steven Ireland
Primary	984,932; 16.40%	658,786; 10.97%
- Thurmond: 20–30% 30–40% 40–50% 50–60% 60–70% Tuck: 30–40% 40–50% 50–60% 60–70% 70–80% Ploski: 30–40%
SPI before election
Tom Torlakson
Elected SPI
Tony Thurmond

The 2018 California Superintendent of Public Instruction election was held on June 5 and November 6, 2018, to elect the Superintendent of Public Instruction of California. Unlike most other elections in California, the superintendent is not elected under the state's "top-two primary". Instead, the officially nonpartisan position is elected at a primary election, with a runoff at a general election if no candidate receives a majority of the vote.

The previous incumbent, Superintendent Tom Torlakson, was term-limited, so could not seek a third term. As no candidate received a majority in the primary, a runoff was held between two Democrats. Tony Thurmond narrowly defeated Marshall Tuck.

== Primary election ==
- Note: The state Superintendent of Public Instruction election in California is officially nonpartisan. The parties below identify which party label each candidate would have run under if given the option.

=== Candidates ===
==== Declared ====
- Steven Ireland
- Lily Ploski, former educator and administrator
- Tony Thurmond, Democratic State Assemblyman (Democratic)
- Marshall Tuck, former CEO of Partnership for LA Schools, former president of Green Dot Public Schools and candidate in 2014 (Democratic)
- Douglas I. Vigil (write-in)
- Thomas L. Williams (write-in)

==== Declined ====
- Natalia Sanchez, NASA Jet Propulsion Laboratory engineer

=== Endorsements ===
Tony Thurmond

Federal-level Elected Officials

- Kamala Harris, U.S. Senator
- Barbara Lee, U.S. Representative (D-CA-13)
- Eric Swalwell, U.S. Representative (D-CA-15)
- Grace Napolitano, U.S. Representative (D-CA-32)
- Jimmy Gomez, U.S. Representative (D-CA-34)
- Jimmy Panetta, U.S. Representative (D-CA-20)
- Judy Chu, U.S. Representative (D-CA-27)
- Karen Bass, U.S. Representative (D-CA-37)
- Mark DeSaulnier, U.S. Representative (D-CA-11)
- Mark Takano, U.S. Representative (D-CA-41)
- Mike Thompson, U.S. Representative (D-CA-5)
- Norma Torres, U.S. Representative (D-CA-35)
- Pete Aguilar U.S. Representative (D-CA-31)
- Ro Khanna, U.S. Representative (D-CA17)
- Sam Farr, former U.S. Representative (D-CA-20)

State-level Elected Officials

- Tom Torlakson, California State Superintendent of Public Instruction
- Jack O'Connell, former California State Superintendent of Public Instruction
- Alex Padilla, California Secretary of State
- Betty Yee, California State Controller
- Dave Jones, California Insurance Commissioner
- Fiona Ma, California State Board of Equalization member
- Jerome Horton, California State Board of Equalization member
- Toni Atkins, president pro tempore of the California State Senate, (SD-39 San Diego)
- Ben Hueso, California State Senator (SD-40 San Diego)
- Bill Monning, California State Senator (SD-17 Monterey)
- Bob Wieckowski, California State Senator (SD-10 Fremont)
- Cathleen Galgiani, California State Senator (SD-05 Stockton)
- Connie Leyva, California State Senator (SD-20 Chino)
- Ed Hernandez, California State Senator (SD-22 West Covina)
- Hannah-Beth Jackson, California State Senator (SD-19 Santa Barbara)
- Holly Mitchell, California State Senator (SD-30 Los Angeles)
- Jerry Hill, California State Senator (SD-13 San Mateo)
- Jim Beall, California State Senator (SD-15 San Jose)
- Josh Newman, California State Senator (SD-29 Brea)
- Mike McGuire, California State Senator (SD-02 Santa Rosa)
- Ricardo Lara, California State Senator (SD-33 Bell Gardens)
- Isadore Hall III, former California State Senator (SD-34 Compton)
- Mark Leno, former California State Senator (SD-09 San Francisco)
- Anthony Rendon, Speaker of the California State Assembly (AD-63 South Gate)
- Ash Kalra, California State Assemblymember (AD-27 San Jose)
- Chris Holden, California State Assemblymember (AD-41 Pasadena)
- David Chiu, California State Assemblymember (AD-17 San Francisco)
- Ed Chau, California State Assemblymember (AD-49 Monterey Park)
- Eduardo Garcia, California State Assemblymember (AD-56 Imperial)
- Eloise Reyes, California State Assemblymember (AD-47 San Bernardino)
- Freddie Rodriguez, California State Assemblymember (AD-52 Chino)
- Ian Calderon, California State Assemblymember (AD-57 Santa Fe Springs)
- Jim Cooper, California State Assemblymember (AD-35 Elk Grove)
- Jim Frazier, California State Assemblymember (AD-11 Fairfield)
- Jim Wood, California State Assemblymember (AD-02 Eureka)
- Jose Medina, California State Assemblymember (AD-61 Riverside)
- Kansen Chu, California State Assemblymember (AD-25 Milpitas)
- Ken Cooley, California State Assemblymember (AD-08 Rancho Cordova)
- Kevin McCarty, California State Assemblymember (AD-07 Sacramento)
- Kevin Mullin, California State Assemblymember (AD-22 San Mateo)
- Lorena Gonzalez Fletcher, California State Assemblymember (AD-80 San Diego)
- Mark Stone, California State Assemblymember (AD-29 Santa Cruz/Monterey)
- Miguel Santiago, California State Assemblymember (AD-53 Los Angeles)
- Mike Gipson, California State Assemblymember (AD-64 Gardena/Compton)
- Patrick O'Donnell, California State Assemblymember (AD-70 Long Beach)
- Phil Ting, California State Assemblymember (AD-19 San Francisco)
- Reggie Jones-Sawyer, California State Assemblymember (AD-59 Los Angeles)
- Rob Bonta, California State Assemblymember (AD-18 Oakland)
- Rudy Salas, California State Assemblymember (AD-32 Bakersfield)
- Sharon Quirk-Silva, California State Assemblymember (AD-65 Buena Park)
- Tom Daly, California State Assemblymember (AD-69 Anaheim)
- Fred Keeley, former Speaker of the California State Assembly (AD-27 Santa Cruz/Monterey)
- Richard Gordon, former California State Assemblymember (AD-24 San Mateo)

Local-level Elected Officials

- Robert Garcia, Mayor of Long Beach
- Darrell Steinberg, Mayor of Sacramento
- Michael Tubbs, Mayor of Stockton
- Jesse Arreguin, Mayor of Berkeley
- Tom Butt, Mayor of Richmond

Organizations

- California Democratic Party
- California Young Democrats
- California College Democrats
- California Teachers Association
- California Federation of Teachers
- California School Employees Association
- California Faculty Association
- Planned Parenthood Affiliates of California
- NARAL Pro-Choice California
- Sierra Club
- California League of Conservation Voters
- Equality California
- California Environmental Justice Alliance (CEJA-Action)
- Stonewall Democratic Club
- California Nurses Association
- United Nurses Association of California/Union of Health Care Professionals
- National Union of Healthcare Workers
- Service Employees International Union of California
- United Food and Commercial Workers Western States Council
- Association of Federal, State, County, and Municipal Employees of California
- State Building and Construction Trades Council of California
- California State Council of Laborers
- California State Pipe Trades Council
- United Teachers Los Angeles
- Associated Administrators of Los Angeles
- Los Angeles School Police Association
- Orange County Employees Association

Newspapers

- Los Angeles Times
- Sacramento Bee
- The Bay Area Reporter

Individuals

- Dolores Huerta, labor leader and civil rights activist
Marshall Tuck

Federal-level Appointed Officials

- Arne Duncan, 9th U.S. Secretary of Education
- Ruben Barrales, former Director of the Office of Intergovernmental Affairs (Republican)

Federal-level Elected Officials

- George Miller, former U.S. Representative (D-CA-11)

State-level Elected Officials

- Bill Honig, former California Superintendent of Public Instruction
- Steve Westly, former California State Controller
- Bill Dodd, California State Senator
- Shirley Weber, California State Assemblywoman
- Bob Pacheco, former California State Assemblyman
- Scott Wiener, California State Senator
- Steve Glazer, California State Senator
- Blanca Rubio, California State Assemblywoman
- Marc Berman, California State Assemblyman
- Kevin Kiley, California State Assemblyman (Republican)
- Juan Arambula, former California State Assemblyman (Independent)
- Gary Hart, former California State Senator

Local-level Elected Officials

- Sam Liccardo, Mayor of San Jose
- Chuck Reed, former Mayor of San Jose
- Mark Ridley-Thomas, member of the Los Angeles County Board of Supervisors
- Michael Ramos, San Bernardino County district attorney (Republican)
- Michael R. Bloomberg, former Mayor of New York City (Independent)
- Richard Riordan, former Mayor of Los Angeles (Republican)
- Monica Garcia, Los Angeles School Board member

Organizations

- Association of California School Administrators
- California Peace Officers' Association

Newspapers

- San Francisco Chronicle
- Mercury News
- East Bay Times
- Santa Cruz Sentinel
- San Diego Union-Tribune

Individuals

- Alice Walton, heiress
- Jim C. Walton, chairman of Arvest Bank
- John Sculley, former CEO of Apple, Inc.
- Doris F. Fisher, co-founder of The Gap, Inc.
- Peter Chernin, businessman
- John D. Arnold, investor and former hedge fund manager
- Jeremy Stoppelman, CEO of Yelp
- Alan Horn, chairman of Walt Disney Studios
- Ted Sarandos, CCO of Netflix
- Scott Stuber, producer
- Ronald Meyer, vice chairman of NBCUniversal
- Thomas Rothman, chairman of Sony Pictures Motion Picture Group
- Chris DeFaria, producer
- David Crane, lecturer at Stanford University
- Reed Hastings, CEO of Netflix
- Meg Whitman, chair of Teach for America and Republican nominee for Governor in 2010 (Republican)

=== Results ===
California Superintendent of Public Instruction election, 2018
Candidate	Votes	%
Marshall Tuck	2,223,784	37.03%
Tony Thurmond	2,136,919	35.59%
Lily Ploski	984,932	16.40%
Steven Ireland	658,786	10.97%
Douglas I. Vigil (write-in)	83	0.00%
Thomas L. Williams (write-in)	66	0.00%
Total votes	6,004,570	100.00%

== Runoff ==
=== Candidates ===
- Tony Thurmond, Democratic State Assemblyman
- Marshall Tuck, former CEO of Partnership for LA Schools, former president of Green Dot Public Schools and candidate in 2014

=== Endorsements ===
Tony Thurmond

Federal-level Elected Officials

- Kamala Harris, U.S. Senator (D-CA)
- Barbara Lee, U.S. Representative (D-CA-13)
- Eric Swalwell, U.S. Representative (D-CA-15)
- Grace Napolitano, U.S. Representative (D-CA-32)
- Jimmy Gomez, U.S. Representative (D-CA-34)
- Jimmy Panetta, U.S. Representative (D-CA-20)
- Judy Chu, U.S. Representative (D-CA-27)
- Karen Bass, U.S. Representative (D-CA-37)
- Mark DeSaulnier, U.S. Representative (D-CA-11)
- Mark Takano, U.S. Representative (D-CA-41)
- Mike Thompson, U.S. Representative (D-CA-5)
- Norma Torres, U.S. Representative (D-CA-35)
- Pete Aguilar U.S. Representative (D-CA-31)
- Ro Khanna, U.S. Representative (D-CA17)
- Sam Farr, former U.S. Representative (D-CA-20)

State-level Elected Officials

- Tom Torlakson, California State Superintendent of Public Instruction
- Jack O'Connell, former California State Superintendent of Public Instruction
- Alex Padilla, California Secretary of State
- Betty Yee, California State Controller
- Dave Jones, California Insurance Commissioner
- Fiona Ma, California State Board of Equalization member
- Jerome Horton, California State Board of Equalization member
- Toni Atkins, president pro tempore of the California State Senate, (SD-39 San Diego)
- Ben Hueso, California State Senator (SD-40 San Diego)
- Bill Monning, California State Senator (SD-17 Monterey)
- Bob Wieckowski, California State Senator (SD-10 Fremont)
- Cathleen Galgiani, California State Senator (SD-05 Stockton)
- Connie Leyva, California State Senator (SD-20 Chino)
- Ed Hernandez, California State Senator (SD-22 West Covina)
- Hannah-Beth Jackson, California State Senator (SD-19 Santa Barbara)
- Holly Mitchell, California State Senator (SD-30 Los Angeles)
- Jerry Hill, California State Senator (SD-13 San Mateo)
- Jim Beall, California State Senator (SD-15 San Jose)
- Josh Newman, California State Senator (SD-29 Brea)
- Mike McGuire, California State Senator (SD-02 Santa Rosa)
- Ricardo Lara, California State Senator (SD-33 Bell Gardens)
- Isadore Hall III, former California State Senator (SD-34 Compton)
- Mark Leno, former California State Senator (SD-09 San Francisco)
- Anthony Rendon, Speaker of the California State Assembly (AD-63 South Gate)
- Ash Kalra, California State Assemblymember (AD-27 San Jose)
- Chris Holden, California State Assemblymember (AD-41 Pasadena)
- David Chiu, California State Assemblymember (AD-17 San Francisco)
- Ed Chau, California State Assemblymember (AD-49 Monterey Park)
- Eduardo Garcia, California State Assemblymember (AD-56 Imperial)
- Eloise Reyes, California State Assemblymember (AD-47 San Bernardino)
- Freddie Rodriguez, California State Assemblymember (AD-52 Chino)
- Ian Calderon, California State Assemblymember (AD-57 Santa Fe Springs)
- Jim Cooper, California State Assemblymember (AD-35 Elk Grove)
- Jim Frazier, California State Assemblymember (AD-11 Fairfield)
- Jim Wood, California State Assemblymember (AD-02 Eureka)
- Jose Medina, California State Assemblymember (AD-61 Riverside)
- Kansen Chu, California State Assemblymember (AD-25 Milpitas)
- Ken Cooley, California State Assemblymember (AD-08 Rancho Cordova)
- Kevin McCarty, California State Assemblymember (AD-07 Sacramento)
- Kevin Mullin, California State Assemblymember (AD-22 San Mateo)
- Lorena Gonzalez Fletcher, California State Assemblymember (AD-80 San Diego)
- Mark Stone, California State Assemblymember (AD-29 Santa Cruz/Monterey)
- Miguel Santiago, California State Assemblymember (AD-53 Los Angeles)
- Mike Gipson, California State Assemblymember (AD-64 Gardena/Compton)
- Patrick O'Donnell, California State Assemblymember (AD-70 Long Beach)
- Phil Ting, California State Assemblymember (AD-19 San Francisco)
- Reggie Jones-Sawyer, California State Assemblymember (AD-59 Los Angeles)
- Rob Bonta, California State Assemblymember (AD-18 Oakland)
- Rudy Salas, California State Assemblymember (AD-32 Bakersfield)
- Sharon Quirk-Silva, California State Assemblymember (AD-65 Buena Park)
- Tom Daly, California State Assemblymember (AD-69 Anaheim)
- Fred Keeley, former Speaker of the California State Assembly (AD-27 Santa Cruz/Monterey)
- Richard Gordon, former California State Assemblymember (AD-24 San Mateo)

Local-level Elected Officials

- Robert Garcia, Mayor of Long Beach
- Darrell Steinberg, Mayor of Sacramento
- Michael Tubbs, Mayor of Stockton
- Jesse Arreguin, Mayor of Berkeley
- Tom Butt, Mayor of Richmond

Organizations

- California Democratic Party
- California Young Democrats
- California College Democrats
- California Teachers Association
- California Federation of Teachers
- California School Employees Association
- California Faculty Association
- Planned Parenthood Affiliates of California
- NARAL Pro-Choice California
- Sierra Club
- California League of Conservation Voters
- Equality California
- California Environmental Justice Alliance (CEJA-Action)
- Stonewall Democratic Club
- California Nurses Association
- United Nurses Association of California/Union of Health Care Professionals
- National Union of Healthcare Workers
- Service Employees International Union of California
- United Food and Commercial Workers Western States Council
- Association of Federal, State, County, and Municipal Employees of California
- State Building and Construction Trades Council of California
- California State Council of Laborers
- California State Pipe Trades Council
- United Teachers Los Angeles
- Associated Administrators of Los Angeles
- Los Angeles School Police Association
- Orange County Employees Association

Newspapers

- Los Angeles Times
- Sacramento Bee
- The Bay Area Reporter

Individuals

- Dolores Huerta, labor leader and civil rights activist
Marshall Tuck

Federal-level Appointed Officials

- Arne Duncan, 9th U.S. Secretary of Education
- Ruben Barrales, former Director of the Office of Intergovernmental Affairs (Republican)

Federal-level Elected Officials

- George Miller, former U.S. Representative (D-CA-11)

State-level Elected Officials

- Bill Honig, former California Superintendent of Public Instruction
- Steve Westly, former California State Controller
- Bill Dodd, California State Senator
- Shirley Weber, California State Assemblywoman
- Bob Pacheco, former California State Assemblyman
- Scott Wiener, California State Senator
- Steve Glazer, California State Senator
- Blanca Rubio, California State Assemblywoman
- Marc Berman, California State Assemblyman
- Kevin Kiley, California State Assemblyman (Republican)
- Juan Arambula, former California State Assemblyman (Independent)
- Gary Hart, former California State Senator

Local-level Elected Officials

- Sam Liccardo, Mayor of San Jose
- Chuck Reed, former Mayor of San Jose
- Mark Ridley-Thomas, member of the Los Angeles County Board of Supervisors
- Michael Ramos, San Bernardino County district attorney (Republican)
- Michael R. Bloomberg, former Mayor of New York City (Independent)
- Richard Riordan, former Mayor of Los Angeles (Republican)
- Monica Garcia, Los Angeles School Board member

Organizations

- Association of California School Administrators
- California Peace Officers' Association

Newspapers

- San Francisco Chronicle
- Mercury News
- East Bay Times
- Santa Cruz Sentinel
- San Diego Union-Tribune

Individuals

- Alice Walton, heiress
- Jim C. Walton, chairman of Arvest Bank
- John Sculley, former CEO of Apple, Inc.
- Doris F. Fisher, co-founder of The Gap, Inc.
- Peter Chernin, businessman
- John D. Arnold, investor and former hedge fund manager
- Jeremy Stoppelman, CEO of Yelp
- Alan Horn, chairman of Walt Disney Studios
- Ted Sarandos, CCO of Netflix
- Scott Stuber, producer
- Ronald Meyer, vice chairman of NBCUniversal
- Thomas Rothman, chairman of Sony Pictures Motion Picture Group
- Chris DeFaria, producer
- David Crane, lecturer at Stanford University
- Reed Hastings, CEO of Netflix
- Meg Whitman, chair of Teach for America and Republican nominee for Governor in 2010 (Republican)
- John H. Cox, businessman and Republican nominee for Governor in 2018 (Republican)

=== Polling ===
Poll source	Date(s) administered	Sample size	Margin of error	Tony Thurmond	Marshall Tuck	Undecided
UC Berkeley	October 19–26, 2018	1,339	± 4.0%	36%	48%	16%
Thomas Partners Strategies	October 18–20, 2018	1,068	± 3.5%	35%	37%	28%
Thomas Partners Strategies	October 5–7, 2018	1,068	± 3.5%	28%	30%	41%
Thomas Partners Strategies	September 28–30, 2018	1,068	± 3.5%	17%	29%	54%

=== Results ===
2018 California Superintendent of Public Instruction runoff election
Candidate	Votes	%
Tony Thurmond	5,385,912	50.88%
Marshall Tuck	5,198,738	49.12%
Total votes	10,584,650	100.00%

==== By county ====
Blue represents counties won by Thurmond. Cyan represents counties won by Tuck.

County	Thurmond #	Thurmond %	Tuck #	Tuck %	Margin #	Margin %	Total
Alameda	329,239	66.84	163,343	33.16	165,896	33.68	492,582
Alpine	271	54.75	224	45.25	47	9.49	495
Amador	5,492	36.08	9,729	63.92	-4,237	-27.84	15,221
Butte	32,418	42.90	43,152	57.10	-10,734	-14.20	75,570
Calaveras	6,585	36.40	11,508	63.60	-4,923	-27.21	18,093
Colusa	1,653	34.65	3,118	65.35	-1,465	-30.71	4,771
Contra Costa	219,343	57.73	160,573	42.27	58,770	15.47	379,916
Del Norte	2,898	43.70	3,733	56.30	-835	-12.59	6,631
El Dorado	29,064	39.18	45,119	60.82	-16,055	-21.64	74,183
Fresno	82,740	37.42	138,359	62.58	-55,619	-25.16	221,099
Glenn	2,196	30.70	4,958	69.30	-2,762	-38.61	7,154
Humboldt	24,733	57.89	17,988	42.11	6,745	15.79	42,721
Imperial	13,034	44.80	16,061	55.20	-3,027	-10.40	29,095
Inyo	2,624	44.26	3,305	55.74	-681	-11.49	5,929
Kern	67,943	37.14	114,999	62.86	-47,056	-25.72	182,942
Kings	8,719	33.73	17,129	66.27	-8,410	-32.54	25,848
Lake	9,423	50.51	9,232	49.49	191	1.02	18,655
Lassen	2,325	31.28	5,108	68.72	-2,783	-37.44	7,433
Los Angeles	1,422,560	56.56	1,092,776	43.44	329,784	13.11	2,515,336
Madera	11,377	34.32	21,770	65.68	-10,393	-31.35	33,147
Marin	72,662	65.64	38,040	34.36	34,622	31.27	110,702
Mariposa	2,565	37.15	4,340	62.85	-1,775	-25.71	6,905
Mendocino	17,871	61.49	11,191	38.51	6,680	22.99	29,062
Merced	20,361	39.68	30,950	60.32	-10,589	-20.64	51,311
Modoc	853	28.90	2,099	71.10	-1,246	-42.21	2,952
Mono	2,039	50.37	2,009	49.63	30	0.74	4,048
Monterey	51,018	50.10	50,806	49.90	212	0.21	101,824
Napa	27,661	56.48	21,311	43.52	6,350	12.97	48,972
Nevada	20,827	46.33	24,129	53.67	-3,302	-7.34	44,956
Orange	391,493	42.93	520,455	57.07	-128,962	-14.14	911,948
Placer	59,483	39.81	89,941	60.19	-30,458	-20.38	149,424
Plumas	2,852	37.91	4,672	62.09	-1,820	-24.19	7,524
Riverside	227,003	42.44	307,875	57.56	-80,872	-15.12	534,878
Sacramento	220,319	49.93	220,897	50.07	-578	-0.13	441,216
San Benito	8,219	46.95	9,287	53.05	-1,068	-6.10	17,506
San Bernardino	194,001	43.32	253,835	56.68	-59,834	-13.36	447,836
San Diego	425,096	45.31	513,201	54.69	-88,105	-9.39	938,297
San Francisco	191,332	66.18	97,777	33.82	93,555	32.36	289,109
San Joaquin	73,936	43.62	95,563	56.38	-21,627	-12.76	169,499
San Luis Obispo	47,890	45.79	56,704	54.21	-8,814	-8.43	104,594
San Mateo	146,678	60.90	94,188	39.10	52,490	21.79	240,866
Santa Barbara	63,388	49.95	63,503	50.05	-115	-0.09	126,891
Santa Clara	294,172	55.72	233,752	44.28	60,420	11.44	527,924
Santa Cruz	60,474	60.00	40,323	40.00	20,151	19.99	100,797
Shasta	19,573	32.22	41,167	67.78	-21,594	-35.55	60,740
Sierra	502	37.16	849	62.84	-347	-25.68	1,351
Siskiyou	5,890	38.89	9,254	61.11	-3,364	-22.21	15,144
Solano	69,575	53.30	60,967	46.70	8,608	6.59	130,542
Sonoma	116,350	62.83	68,825	37.17	47,525	25.66	185,175
Stanislaus	57,167	42.25	78,126	57.75	-20,959	-15.49	135,293
Sutter	8,580	32.63	17,716	67.37	-9,136	-34.74	26,296
Tehama	5,476	30.49	12,485	69.51	-7,009	-39.02	17,961
Trinity	1,844	40.14	2,750	59.86	-906	-19.72	4,594
Tulare	30,384	35.79	54,513	64.21	-24,129	-28.42	84,897
Tuolumne	7,343	37.00	12,504	63.00	-5,161	-26.00	19,847
Ventura	123,812	48.29	132,555	51.71	-8,743	-3.41	256,367
Yolo	36,948	57.64	27,155	42.36	9,793	15.28	64,103
Yuba	5,638	34.22	10,840	65.78	-5,202	-31.57	16,478
Totals	5,385,912	50.88	5,198,738	49.12	187,174	1.77	10,584,650

== See also ==
- California Department of Education
