= Anthony Rendon (politician) =

American politician (born 1968)

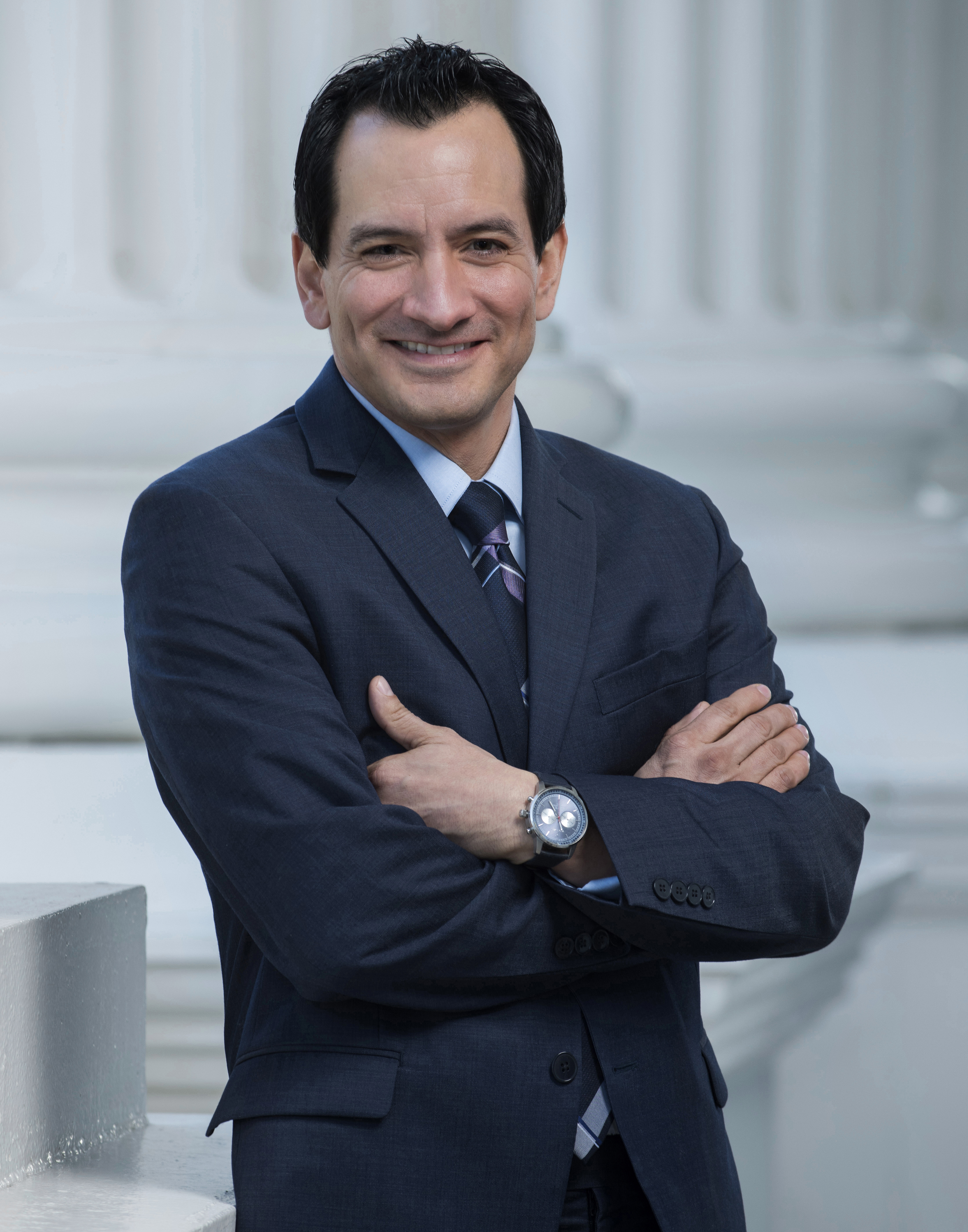
- Official portrait, 2016

70th Speaker of the California State Assembly
- In office March 7, 2016 – June 30, 2023
- Preceded by: Toni Atkins
- Succeeded by: Robert Rivas

Member of the California State Assembly
- In office December 3, 2012 – November 30, 2024
- Preceded by: Mike Morrell
- Succeeded by: Jose Solache
- Constituency: 63rd district (2012–2022); 62nd district (2022–2024)

Personal details
- Born: March 4, 1968 (age 58) Los Angeles, California, U.S.
- Party: Democratic
- Spouse: Annie Lam (m. 2014)
- Children: 1
- Education: Cerritos College; California State University, Fullerton (BA, MA); University of California, Riverside (PhD)
- Website: Official website

Anthony Rendon (born March 4, 1968) is an American politician who served as the 70th speaker of the California State Assembly from 2016 to 2023. A member of the Democratic Party, he is the second-longest serving speaker in California history and the longest-serving speaker to serve his first term after the adoption of California's term limits. From 2022 to 2024, he represented the 62nd district, located in the southeastern part of Los Angeles County, including the cities of South Gate, Lynwood, and Paramount. He previously represented the 63rd district from 2012 to 2022.

In 2023, Politico reported that Rendon's speakership was "one of California's most consequential speakerships", and that he "has presided over a progressive policy bonanza", as California "hiked the minimum wage, gave farmworkers overtime, enacted ambitious climate laws, expanded early childhood education, and delivered landmark labor wins".

== Early life and career ==
Rendon was born on March 4, 1968 in Silver Lake, a neighborhood in central Los Angeles. His grandparents immigrated from Mexico to the United States during the 1920s. He grew up in a working class family that frequently moved around the Los Angeles area. His father, Tom Rendon, worked multiple jobs, including for a mobile home company, and his mother, Gloria Rendon, was a teacher's aide at a Catholic school.

Rendon attended California High School, Whittier, graduating in 1986. He has stated that he was a "terrible student." At the age of 20, he enrolled in and attended Cerritos College, a community college in Norwalk, California, before earning a bachelor's degree and master's degree from California State University, Fullerton. After receiving a National Endowment for the Humanities fellowship, Rendon earned his Ph.D. in political science from the University of California, Riverside, graduating in 2000. He completed post-doctoral work at Boston University.

Prior to becoming a member of the California State Assembly, Rendon was the executive director of Plaza de la Raza Child Development Services, an organization that provides child development and social and medical services throughout Los Angeles County. He was also the interim executive director of the California League of Conservation Voters, a lobbying organization dedicated to environmental issues. He worked with the Mexican American Opportunity Foundation in early childhood education efforts. From 2001 to 2008, he was an adjunct professor in the Department of Political Science and Criminal Justice at California State University, Fullerton. In the spring of 2025, Rendon was a fellow at the USC Center for the Political Future.

== Political career ==
During his first term in office, Rendon was chair of the Assembly Committee on Water, Parks, and Wildlife and authored Proposition 1, the $7.5 billion state water bond, which voters approved in the November 2014 election.

In 2013, Rendon authored Assembly Bill 711, a statewide ban on lead hunting ammunition, that was signed into law.

In 2015, Rendon was named chair of the Assembly Committee on Utilities and Commerce.

On September 3, 2015, Rendon was selected to be the next Assembly Speaker. The formal vote electing Rendon as Speaker occurred on January 11. The vote was unanimous, with the Republican leader seconding the motion.

Rendon brought back the tradition of past California Assembly speakers of carrying no legislation himself, but focusing on empowering the members of the chamber. Despite this, he has made certain priorities of his known, including wildfire planning, and continuing to address poverty and educational deficits in California.

On February 19, 2021, The Sacramento Bee reported that nonprofit organizations associated with Rendon's wife, Annie Lam, had received over $500,000 in donations and event sponsorships from over a dozen companies that had business interests at stake with the legislature. In 2023, the Los Angeles Times reported that she received an unusually large income ($600,000 in 2022) from her job as a consultant, much of it from organizations with business before the legislature, and reported that others in government were concerned about ethical considerations.

In November 2022 due to a rift in the Assembly Democratic Caucus between its progressive and moderate members, the caucus voted to replace Rendon with Assemblymember Robert Rivas as the next speaker of the California State Assembly. With Rendon to remain as Speaker until June 30, 2023.

Rendon was a member of the California Legislative Progressive Caucus.

Rendon unsuccessfully ran for Superintendent of Public Instruction, receiving 8% of the vote and failing to advance to the top-two runoff.

== Electoral history ==
=== 2012 ===
California State Assembly election, 2012
Primary election
Party	Candidate	Votes	%
Democratic	Anthony Rendon	8,776	38.0
Republican	Jack M. Guerrero	7,017	30.4
Democratic	Diane Janet Martinez	5,833	25.3
Democratic	Cathrin "Cat" Sargent	1,460	6.3
Total votes		23,086	100.0
General election
Democratic	Anthony Rendon	76,258	74.5
Republican	Jack M. Guerrero	26,093	25.5
Total votes		102,351	100.0
Democratic gain from Republican			

=== 2014 ===
California's 63rd State Assembly district election, 2014
Primary election
Party	Candidate	Votes	%
Democratic	Anthony Rendon (incumbent)	12,089	64.7
Republican	Adam Joshua Miller	6,597	35.3
Total votes		18,686	100.0
General election
Democratic	Anthony Rendon (incumbent)	28,544	69.1
Republican	Adam Joshua Miller	12,781	30.9
Total votes		41,325	100.0
Democratic hold			

=== 2016 ===
California's 63rd State Assembly district election, 2016
Primary election
Party	Candidate	Votes	%
Democratic	Anthony Rendon (incumbent)	45,391	78.5
Republican	Adam Joshua Miller	12,419	21.5
Total votes		57,810	100.0
General election
Democratic	Anthony Rendon (incumbent)	89,134	77.6
Republican	Adam Joshua Miller	25,680	22.4
Total votes		114,814	100.0
Democratic hold			

=== 2018 ===
California's 63rd State Assembly district election, 2018
Primary election
Party	Candidate	Votes	%
Democratic	Anthony Rendon (incumbent)	18,047	46.6
Democratic	Maria D. Estrada	11,252	29.1
Republican	Adam Joshua Miller	9,419	24.3
Total votes		38,718	100.0
General election
Democratic	Anthony Rendon (incumbent)	49,367	54.3
Democratic	Maria D. Estrada	41,626	45.7
Total votes		90,993	100.0
Democratic hold			

=== 2020 ===
2020 California State Assembly election
Primary election
Party	Candidate	Votes	%
Democratic	Anthony Rendon (incumbent)	32,471	58.0
Democratic	Maria D. Estrada	23,481	42.0
Total votes		55,952	100.0
General election
Democratic	Anthony Rendon (incumbent)	71,460	53.7
Democratic	Maria D. Estrada	61,611	46.3
Total votes		133,071	100.0
Democratic hold			

=== 2022 ===
2022 California's 62nd State Assembly district election
Primary election
Party	Candidate	Votes	%
Democratic	Anthony Rendon (incumbent)	24,003	67.0
Democratic	Maria Estrada	11,826	33.0
Total votes		35,829	100%
General election
Democratic	Anthony Rendon (incumbent)	39,442	63.9
Democratic	Maria Estrada	22,285	36.1
Total votes		61,727	100%
Democratic hold			

=== 2026 ===
2026 California Superintendent of Public Instruction election
Candidate	Votes	%
Sonja Shaw	1,737,735	22.64
Richard Barrera	1,558,298	20.30
Nichelle M. Henderson	738,236	9.62
Wendy Castaneda Leal	675,968	8.81
Al Muratsuchi	646,329	8.42
Anthony Rendon	624,266	8.13
Frank Lara	578,171	7.53
Josh Newman	522,758	6.81
Ainye Long	426,104	5.55
Gus Mattammal	167,723	2.19
Total votes	7,675,588	100.0

== Personal life ==
Rendon resides in Lakewood, California. In December 2014, Rendon married Annie Lam in a ceremony officiated by former California State Assembly Speaker John A. Pérez.

Political offices
Preceded by Toni Atkins	Speaker of the California State Assembly; 2016–2023	Succeeded by Robert Rivas
