= Congregatio Canonicorum Sancti Augustini =

German High Church religious community of clergy and laymen

Congregatio Canonicorum Sancti Augustini (CCSA) (Congregation of the Canons of St Augustine) is a German High Church religious community of clergy and laymen.

CCSA was founded at the Priory of St. Wigbert, a Benedictine monastery, in September 12, 2005. It was established by four men, whose zeal was to bring people closer to the gospel of Jesus Christ in the tradition of the catholic and apostolic Church. It is led by a prior, who in 2025 was the Lutheran pastor Franz Schwarz. The Brothers gather together regularly in conventions. As a habit clergy wear a black soutane with black fascia and laity a black tunic in conventions.

== See also ==
- Canons Regular
