= Lily Ploski =

American educator and author

Lily E. Espinoza is an American educator and author, who was a candidate in the 2018 California Superintendent of Public Instruction election.

== Early life and education ==
Espinoza attended Diablo Valley College in Pleasant Hill and transferred to the University of California at Berkeley, where she graduated with a bachelor's degree in Women's Studies. She moved to New York where she earned her master's degree in Student Personnel Administration from Columbia University. In 2011, she received her doctorate in education from California State University, Fullerton in the inaugural cohort for the doctorate in education program with a concentration in community college leadership. her 2011 dissertation, Meaning of College Choice for California Community College Latina Transfer Students, researched the personal and academic factors that influence Latina community college students decisions to transfer to baccalaureate-granting institutions.

== Career ==
In 2003, Espinoza was profiled for a piece in La Voz News by Meera Kumbhani to put a face to the recent flood of layoffs in the Foothill-De Anza district. A speech Espinoza gave at a rally organized by Student for Justice (SFJ) was quoted in another piece by La Voz News about an SFJ-led campout, 'Tent City'. Luke Stangel for La Voz News also wrote about tent city after spending a night there in support of Ploski.

In 2012, while serving as Dean and athletic director at Solano Community College, Ploski published an article on the lives of lesbian, gay, bisexual, transgender, and queer (LGBTQ) students in the Community College Journal of Research. In 2017, Ploski began teaching as an instructor at the Upward Bound program at Mills College in Oakland. Espinoza published her book, Not Getting Stuck: Success Stories of Being Latina and Transferring from a California Community College, the same year. Her book covers a series of personal narratives of Latina students and raises concerns about systemic challenges students face during the college application process. Ploski received speaking engagement invitations such as her presentation on Overcoming Barriers to Education at Polk State College. In December 2017, Ploski announced her bid for California State Superintendent of Public Instruction.
