= 2014 California Superintendent of Public Instruction election =

- June 3, 2014 (first round); November 4, 2014 (runoff)
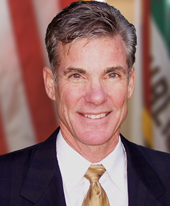

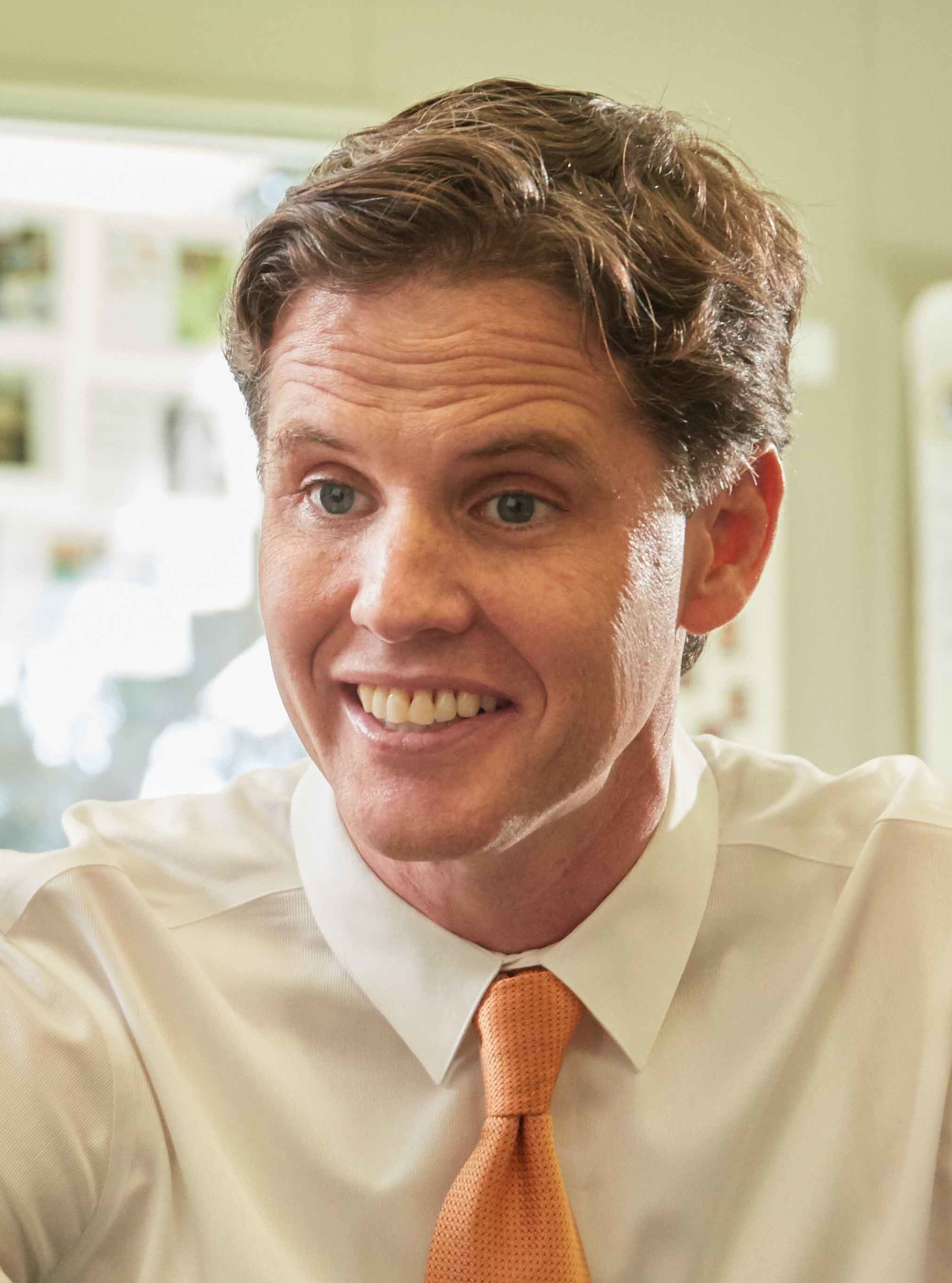

Candidate	Tom Torlakson	Marshall Tuck	Lydia Gutierrez
Party	Nonpartisan	Nonpartisan	Nonpartisan
First round	1,767,257; 46.54%	1,098,441; 28.93%	931,719; 24.54%
Runoff	3,167,212; 52.14%	2,906,989; 47.86%	Eliminated
- Torlakson: 30–40% 40–50% 50–60% 60–70% 70–80% Tuck: 30–40% 50–60% Gutierrez: 40–50%
Superintendent before election
Tom Torlakson
Elected Superintendent
Tom Torlakson

The 2014 California Superintendent of Public Instruction election was held on November 4, 2014, to elect the Superintendent of Public Instruction of California. Unlike most other elections in California, the superintendent is not elected under the state's "top-two primary". Instead, the officially nonpartisan position is elected via a nonpartisan primary election, with a runoff only held if no candidate receives a majority of the vote.

Incumbent superintendent Tom Torlakson ran for re-election to a second term in office. In the primary election on June 3, 2014, no candidate received a majority of the vote, so the top two finishers, Torlakson and Marshall Tuck, contested a general election, which Torlakson won.

== Primary election ==
=== Candidates ===
- Lydia Gutierrez, teacher, Coastal San Pedro Neighborhood Councilwoman and candidate for Superintendent in 2010
- Tom Torlakson, incumbent superintendent of public instruction
- Marshall Tuck, educator, former CEO of Partnership for LA Schools and former president of Green Dot Public Schools

=== Results ===
California Superintendent of Public Instruction primary, 2014
Candidate	Votes	%
Tom Torlakson (incumbent)	1,767,257	46.54%
Marshall Tuck	1,098,441	28.93%
Lydia Gutierrez	931,719	24.54%
Total votes	3,797,417	100.00%

== General election ==
=== Polling ===
Poll source	Date(s) administered	Sample size	Margin of error	Tom Torlakson	Marshall Tuck	Undecided
GQR/American Viewpoint	October 22–29, 2014	1,162	± 3.3%	32%	29%	40%
Field Poll	October 15–28, 2014	941	± 3.4%	28%	28%	44%
Field Poll	August 14–28, 2014	467	± 4.8%	28%	31%	41%

=== Results ===
2014 California Superintendent of Public Instruction runoff election
Candidate	Votes	%
Tom Torlakson (incumbent)	3,167,212	52.14%
Marshall Tuck	2,906,989	47.86%
Total votes	6,074,201	100.00%

==== By county ====
Blue represents counties won by Torlakson. Cyan represents counties won by Tuck.

County	Torlakson #	Torlakson %	Tuck #	Tuck %	Margin #	Margin %	Total
Alameda	203,080	68.36	93,993	31.64	109,087	36.72	297,073
Alpine	241	62.92	142	37.08	99	25.85	383
Amador	4,648	43.01	6,160	56.99	-1,512	-13.99	10,808
Butte	24,898	47.97	27,005	52.03	-2,107	-4.06	51,903
Calaveras	6,032	45.37	7,264	54.63	-1,232	-9.27	13,296
Colusa	1,560	44.38	1,955	55.62	-395	-11.24	3,515
Contra Costa	154,581	66.38	78,277	33.62	76,304	32.77	232,858
Del Norte	3,050	50.35	3,007	49.65	43	0.71	6,057
El Dorado	21,335	41.66	29,883	58.34	-8,548	-16.69	51,218
Fresno	64,640	45.93	76,086	54.07	-11,446	-8.13	140,726
Glenn	2,073	40.59	3,034	59.41	-961	-18.82	5,107
Humboldt	19,157	65.44	10,115	34.56	9,042	30.89	29,272
Imperial	9,483	52.33	8,639	47.67	844	4.66	18,122
Inyo	2,223	50.23	2,203	49.77	20	0.45	4,426
Kern	49,431	41.13	70,745	58.87	-21,314	-17.74	120,176
Kings	8,155	41.20	11,638	58.80	-3,483	-17.60	19,793
Lake	9,276	60.80	5,981	39.20	3,295	21.60	15,257
Lassen	2,989	52.13	2,745	47.87	244	4.26	5,734
Los Angeles	628,498	50.61	613,313	49.39	15,185	1.22	1,241,811
Madera	10,466	43.83	13,414	56.17	-2,948	-12.35	23,880
Marin	42,402	61.51	26,535	38.49	15,867	23.02	68,937
Mariposa	2,511	44.57	3,123	55.43	-612	-10.86	5,634
Mendocino	13,623	68.37	6,301	31.63	7,322	36.75	19,924
Merced	16,544	50.64	16,124	49.36	420	1.29	32,668
Modoc	1,031	42.18	1,413	57.82	-382	-15.63	2,444
Mono	1,409	56.86	1,069	43.14	340	13.72	2,478
Monterey	37,305	60.41	24,453	39.59	12,852	20.81	61,758
Napa	20,430	62.88	12,062	37.12	8,368	25.75	32,492
Nevada	14,728	49.50	15,023	50.50	-295	-0.99	29,751
Orange	223,784	43.39	291,929	56.61	-68,145	-13.21	515,713
Placer	39,370	41.43	55,666	58.57	-16,296	-17.15	95,036
Plumas	2,670	45.73	3,169	54.27	-499	-8.55	5,839
Riverside	130,214	46.48	149,923	53.52	-19,709	-7.04	280,137
Sacramento	132,673	48.32	141,912	51.68	-9,239	-3.36	274,585
San Benito	6,720	57.77	4,912	42.23	1,808	15.54	11,632
San Bernardino	108,389	46.06	126,950	53.94	-18,561	-7.89	235,339
San Diego	240,986	44.14	305,028	55.86	-64,042	-11.73	546,014
San Francisco	109,199	70.18	46,408	29.82	62,791	40.35	155,607
San Joaquin	52,905	50.72	51,398	49.28	1,507	1.44	104,303
San Luis Obispo	39,768	58.42	28,299	41.58	11,469	16.85	68,067
San Mateo	82,844	63.55	47,510	36.45	35,334	27.11	130,354
Santa Barbara	54,840	62.59	32,783	37.41	22,057	25.17	87,623
Santa Clara	185,455	59.38	126,842	40.62	58,613	18.77	312,297
Santa Cruz	38,304	66.19	19,565	33.81	18,739	32.38	57,869
Shasta	19,986	42.51	27,031	57.49	-7,045	-14.98	47,017
Sierra	629	49.88	632	50.12	-3	-0.24	1,261
Siskiyou	6,103	55.34	4,925	44.66	1,178	10.68	11,028
Solano	45,070	57.94	32,713	42.06	12,357	15.89	77,783
Sonoma	78,083	65.33	41,442	34.67	36,641	30.66	119,525
Stanislaus	42,182	54.52	35,185	45.48	6,997	9.04	77,367
Sutter	7,737	43.62	10,001	56.38	-2,264	-12.76	17,738
Tehama	5,600	42.26	7,650	57.74	-2,050	-15.47	13,250
Trinity	1,590	47.93	1,727	52.07	-137	-4.13	3,317
Tulare	24,274	45.57	28,992	54.43	-4,718	-8.86	53,266
Tuolumne	6,682	48.19	7,183	51.81	-501	-3.61	13,865
Ventura	80,084	49.45	81,866	50.55	-1,782	-1.10	161,950
Yolo	20,833	54.55	17,361	45.45	3,472	9.09	38,194
Yuba	4,439	41.39	6,285	58.61	-1,846	-17.21	10,724
Totals	3,167,212	52.14	2,906,989	47.86	260,223	4.28	6,074,201

== See also ==
- California Department of Education
