= Marshall Tuck =

American educator, venture capitalist, and politician

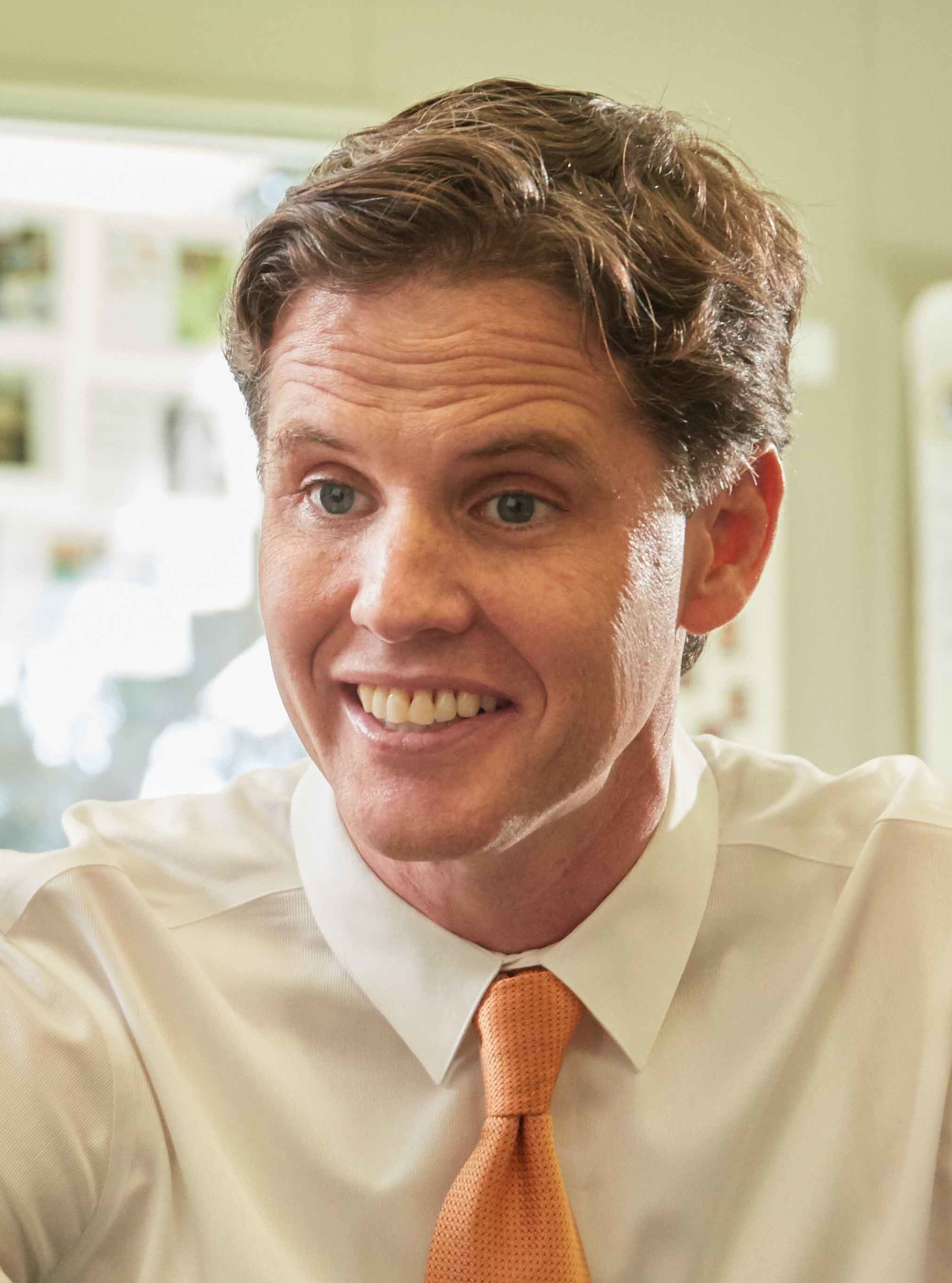
- Tuck in 2017

Personal details
- Born: July 28, 1973 (age 52) Burlingame, California, U.S.
- Spouse: Mae
- Children: 1
- Education: University of California, Los Angeles (BA); Harvard University (MBA)
- Occupation: Educator; political advisor; public official

Marshall Tuck (born July 28, 1973) is an American educator and politician. He was CEO of Antonio Villaraigosa's Partnership for Los Angeles Schools and president of Green Dot Public Schools. Tuck was a candidate for California State Superintendent of Public Instruction in 2014 and 2018, placing second in the general election in both races.

== Early life and education ==
Tuck was born in Burlingame, California, and grew up in Hillsborough. He attended parochial elementary school and public middle and high schools, graduating from San Mateo High School. His father was a lawyer and his mother was a teacher. Tuck is one of four siblings.

Tuck graduated from UCLA and Harvard Business School. After school, he worked for two years at Wall Street Bank Salomon Brothers before spending a year teaching and doing service work internationally. He then became a senior leader at Model N, a revenue management software company based in the Silicon Valley, before switching careers to work full-time in education.

== Education career ==
In 2007, after working as an education advisor to Los Angeles Mayor Antonio Villaraigosa, Tuck became the founding CEO of the Partnership for Los Angeles Schools, a collaboration between the City of Los Angeles and the Los Angeles Unified School District, which began by operating 10 public schools.

The contract between Villaraigosa's office and the Los Angeles Unified School District eventually included 17 struggling elementary, middle, and high schools serving about 15,000 students. Tuck claimed these schools raised four-year graduation rates by more than 60%, had the highest academic improvement among California’s school systems with more than 10,000 students, and boasted the Parent College, a parent engagement program. A report by a third-party research institute included the Partnership as a new governance model for public education that was being used as an alternative to charter schools in communities that were resistant to new charter schools. News coverage of the Partnership's 10-year history noted it as a "unique turnaround model is driving big gains at struggling campuses". Tuck continues as a member of the Partnership for Los Angeles Schools' Board of Directors.

The Partnership for Los Angeles Schools faced controversy during Tuck's tenure. Teachers at 8 of 10 schools gave Tuck landslide votes of "no confidence" after his first year. Parents at Ritter Elementary School, together with the Mexican American Legal Defense and Educational Fund, filed a complaint in 2009 after Tuck cut dual language immersion programs. After three years of Tuck's leadership, the Los Angeles Times reported that while academic performance had improved at the Partnership for Los Angeles Schools, improvements were greater at Los Angeles Unified schools with similar demographics.

Prior to that, Tuck was President of the Charter Management Organization (CMO) Green Dot Public Schools, where he helped to create 10 new public charter high schools in some of Los Angeles' poorest neighborhoods. Of the 10 schools that Tuck helped to open, 8 were recognized by the U.S. News & World Report as among the best high schools in the country.

Tuck is a board member of the nonprofit Parent Revolution, an organization with the mission to "ensure families, especially those from historically underserved communities, can use their power to secure an excellent public education for their children, children in their community, and all children in California"."

Tuck was an educator-in-residence at the New Teacher Center, a nonprofit organization working with school districts to help develop and retain effective teachers and principals.

In 2022, Tuck was a finalist for the position of Superintendent of the Orleans Parish School Board in New Orleans.

=== 2014 election for State Superintendent ===
In 2014, Tuck ran a campaign against the incumbent State Superintendent of Public Instruction in California. Tuck won the endorsement of every major newspaper in the state, including the Los Angeles Times, the San Francisco Chronicle, the San Diego Union-Tribune, and the Sacramento Bee. the Fresno Bee, the San Jose Mercury News,

The race received national attention, and money raised and spent on the campaigns exceeded that spent in that year's gubernatorial election between Governor Jerry Brown, and challenger Neel Kashkari. A recurring issue in the campaign was an ongoing legal challenge to the state's laws granting teacher permanent status ("tenure") after two years. Tuck said he supported the students who brought the lawsuit, and wanted to see California law change to extend the amount of time before a teacher had to earn tenure or be let go.

Tuck was among the top two vote-getters in the primary.

=== 2018 election for State Superintendent ===
In March 2017, Tuck announced that he would run again for State Superintendent of Public Instruction in 2018. Tuck finished in first place in the June 2018 primary, with 2,223,784. The general election campaign for State Superintendent received national attention. President Obama's Education Secretary Arne Duncan penned an OpEd for the San Jose Mercury News, supporting Tuck and urging voters to "forget the lies in the state schools' superintendent race".

== Personal life ==
Tuck has spent most of his adult life in Los Angeles. He lives in the city with his wife, Mae, a first generation Chinese-American. They have a son.
