= California Charter Schools Association =

American educational advocacy group

- Abbreviation: CCSA
- Formation: 2003; 23 years ago
- Type: Nonprofit organization
- Region served: California
- Board Chair: Cristina de Jesus
- President and CEO: Myrna Castrejón
- Website: ccsa.org

The California Charter Schools Association, abbreviated as CCSA, is an American charter school advocacy group, based in California. It represents many of the state's more than 1,200 charter schools.

The organization's political advocacy arm, California Charter Schools Association Advocates, has played an influential role in some of the state's most expensive and competitive school board elections.

== History ==
The California Charter Schools Association was founded in 2003.

CCSA has defended charter schools against allegations of fraud and mismanagement. The organization has successfully fought restrictions on colocations with traditional public schools, protected under 2000 California Proposition 39, including through lawsuits against individual school districts.

Since its founding, CCSA Advocates and its affiliated political action committees have frequently clashed with teachers unions including the California Teachers Association and United Teachers Los Angeles over the issue of charter schools. In 2026, agreement between the organizations in the 2026 California Superintendent of Public Instruction election and low spending in Los Angeles Unified School District races led some commentators to conclude that this conflict may have ended.
