= California School Employees Association =

American trade union

- Abbreviation: CSEA
- Formation: August 9, 1927
- Type: Trade union
- Headquarters: San Jose, California, US
- Location: California, US
- Members: 248,000
- President: Adam Weinberger
- Affiliations: AFL–CIO (California Labor Federation)
- Website: csea.com

The California School Employees Association (CSEA) is the largest classified school employees labor union in the United States. CSEA represents a quarter million classified public school employees in California.

CSEA was formed in 1927 by a determined group of Oakland custodians who saw the need to gain protections for themselves and other classified employees. The CSEA has experienced longevity as a union and is an affiliated member of the AFL–CIO.

== Overview ==
=== Statewide Organization ===
CSEA consists of ten geographic Areas with each Area represented by an Area Director elected by members in that Area. The Area Directors serve on the Board of Directors, along with five additional executive members of the Board each elected at the annual CSEA conference. The current CSEA President is Adam Weinberger.

The ten statewide Areas contain 100 Regions with each Region represented by a Regional Representative appointed by the Association President. The Regional Representatives serve the Association President for one year. Regional Representatives also serve on many important committees at the President's request.

CSEA is democratically controlled, with members in more than 750 local chapters. Chapters elect officers, bargain collectively with their employer and implement CSEA programs locally. Chapters also send delegates to the annual CSEA conference to discuss and democratically decide resolutions and policies concerning the future direction for CSEA.

=== Professional Staff ===
Executive Director Keith Pace heads the professional staff at Headquarters in San Jose, California. Other services housed in San Jose Headquarters are Accounting, Communications, Executive, Field Operations, Human Resources, Training, Information Systems, Legal, Member Benefits, and Office Services.

CSEA maintains a professional Labor Relations staff. The Labor Relations Representatives perform a range of professional services, working out of ten field offices across California to better serve local membership.

CSEA also maintains a professional Governmental Relations staff. The Governmental Relations office is responsible for passing legislation favorable to the interests of classified employees. The Governmental Relations office is located adjacent to the state Capitol in Sacramento.

== CSEA History ==
On August 9, 1927, a group of nine men and one woman from Oakland assembled for CSEA's first conference. During the three-day meeting, they established a framework for the union and set an agenda of progress that continued to elevate the status of classified employees for the next three-quarters of a century.

=== Retirement benefits ===
In 1928, just a year after CSEA formed, the union helped push through SB 551, which allowed school districts to establish retirement benefits for all school employees, not just teachers. More importantly, it became the first law on the books recognizing school employees other than teachers and administrators. In 1999, CSEA helped pass SB 400, landmark legislation that dramatically increased classified employees’ retirement income.

Today, members' pensions and benefits are managed by the California Public Employees’ Retirement System (CalPERS), the largest public pension fund in the United States.

=== Great Depression ===
In 1929, when California and the rest of the country plunged into the Great Depression, poor school districts began trimming budgets and classified jobs. For classified employees (known at the time simply as "non-certificated" workers), the Depression meant an increase in their workday to 12 hours per day, six days a week with wages as low as taxpayers could get them.

At the union's 1933 conference, Frank Hart addressed the delegates. "Better trained custodians would save districts far more than their cost", he explained. "Custodians themselves would have to raise their standards if they ever hoped to raise their pay." Since then, CSEA has prided itself on creating job training opportunities for its members. A member survey in 2000 found that 67 percent of CSEA members believe that improving professional growth opportunities is very important. CSEA is working to meet the needs of its members by negotiating career ladders and incentive programs and by offering scholarships and career grants.

=== Classified Bill of Rights ===
In the years following World War II, CSEA established itself as an important part of the education community. In just ten years, membership shot up from 1,400 members to nearly 10,000. After this growth, the union demanded that basic rights and benefits, which had been enjoyed by teachers for years, should finally be extended to classified employees from the state government.

Among the bills that passed were the 40-hour work week, sick leave, vacation and bereavement leave and laws prohibiting age discrimination. This historic achievement for CSEA later became known as “The Classified Bill of Rights.”

Once CSEA passed the Classified Bill of Rights, the union pressed on to secure paid holidays, salary increases for reclassified positions, salary protections for instructional aides, the right to unemployment insurance, collective bargaining rights, workplace safety measures, and improved pension benefits. CSEA members also worked to defeat many harmful proposals including school vouchers, pension raids, and cuts in education funding.

=== "Meet and beg" bargaining ===
By the 1960s, CSEA had established itself as an important organization in the education community. However, for all of its strength in representing classified employees at the state level, the union still lacked the teeth it needed at the local level—namely at the bargaining table. Collective bargaining was still a decade away, and workers were at the mercy of their employer. Under the Winton Act, employees would "meet and confer" with district officials to discuss salaries and benefits. Classified employees simply referred to it as "meet and beg."

Job security depended on an employee’s relationship with their supervisor. In 1971, only 5.7 percent of CSEA members surveyed reported satisfaction with their level of job security, compared to 89 percent in 2000.

When signed into law in 1975, the Rodda Act ended the days of "meet and beg bargaining". Collective bargaining was a coming of age for CSEA, then 70,000 strong. It gave the union power to negotiate at the bargaining table and to represent employees under the full strength of the new labor laws.

Today, CSEA employs nearly 300 full-time staff members to help its member-run chapters negotiate top-notch contracts with good pay and benefits for classified employees.

=== Record-breaking 1981 strike ===
The longest public employee's strike in California's history took place in Pittsburg. From 30 September to 30 October 1981, almost 300 classified employees at Pittsburg Unified School District, in West Contra Costa County walked the picket lines.

Led by Local President Rosemary DiMaggio and Chief Steward Rose Greenup, the members of California School Employees Association (CSEA) Chapter 44 walked out when negotiations for a new contract broke down. The previous year, their counterparts in Chapter #85, at neighboring Antioch School District had gone out for 9 days, and tensions had been brewing in Pittsburg for some time, so it was no surprise when the bus drivers, custodians, teacher's aides, food service workers, clerical staff and library assistants hit the bricks.

The District had been battling its staff annually over summer lay-offs and this, coupled with the pay equity concept in vogue at the time ("Comparable Worth") came to a boil when their contract expired in summer, '81. Right in the middle of the strike, an election for three new School Board members occurred. As well as walking picket lines daily, members endorsed incumbent Joe Canciamilla (now a member of the State Assembly) and newcomer Dana Hunt (a county sheriff and union member). Their election was pivotal in settling a strike that gained a contract with wage increases that exceeded the State cost-of-living-adjustment, redressed imbalances in the male-female hourly rate inequities and provided lay-off protections for summer workers.

No other public sector workers have ever had to strike for so long, before or since.

=== School funding dries up ===
For decades, California had enjoyed full funding for its schools and unique educational programs. Then in 1978, California voters approved Proposition 13 in an attempt to cut property taxes. The state's public school system and its employees would never be the same.

By 1995, California plummeted from fifth in the country to 40th in school spending. Classified employees, who had finally gotten a piece of the pie through collective bargaining, found that there just wasn't much to go around. Many school programs such as music, art, and athletics simply vanished, and school districts either transferred classified employees working in those programs or laid them off. By the late 1980s, schools, parents and even some of the voters who passed Prop.13, were tired of the funding shortfalls.

The California Teachers Association (CTA), along with CSEA and other members of the education community, led the charge for a second ballot initiative. In 1988, Prop. 98 was passed to guarantee a minimum level of state funding for public schools. It is a complicated formula, at times politicians have manipulated it, but it stabilized revenue for the state's public schools.

=== CSEA establishes safety guidelines ===
Safety has also been a long-standing priority among classified employees, but it had never been the large-scale concern that it became during the 1980s asbestos scare. Asbestos, a flaky white mineral, had been widely used in school construction between 1945 and 1973 on ceilings and as an insulator for pipes and boilers. Then in 1982, the Environmental Protection Agency ordered schools to be inspected for this cancer-causing substance.

An initial survey by the California Department of Education found that nearly half of the state's school facilities contained friable (easily crumbled) asbestos in gyms, hallways, boiler rooms, and classrooms. Maintenance workers, custodians and all school employees felt at risk.

CSEA successfully lobbied the Legislature to issue safety guidelines for school employees dealing with asbestos and its removal from school buildings. Since 1982, the State Department of Education has been required to distribute information to all districts regarding the safe handling, storage, clean-up and disposal of any toxic substances found on school grounds.

By 1984, cash-strapped districts had already spent $160 million on asbestos clean up, and they had only begun to address the problem. Though the worst sites have been taken care of, asbestos removal in our public schools continues to this day.

=== Enter technology ===
There was a time when it was all done by hand: attendance, bookkeeping, filing and everything else. By the 1980s and 1990s, new technology was here to stay. New technology has impacted classified employees from custodians to secretaries.

For many classified employees, computers have given their job more variety. Computers have freed them from paper filing and allowed more interaction with students. Library technicians, instructional assistants, and other classified professionals use current technology and support students and colleagues in learning how to use it.

=== CSEA joins the AFL–CIO ===
At CSEA's annual conference in 2001, delegates voted to become an independently chartered union of the AFL–CIO. Under the charter, CSEA retained its constitution and bylaws, without outside control by the AFL–CIO. Members gained access to new discounts and benefits through the AFL–CIO's Union Plus program. More significantly, the independent charter gave CSEA members the power and clout that comes from combining CSEA's strength with that of more than 13 million other AFL–CIO members.

Three years after joining the national AFL–CIO, CSEA joined the statewide California Labor Federation (CLF) in 2004. The CLF represents 2.1 million workers in more than 1,300 affiliated unions.
