= Electoral history of Tom McClintock =

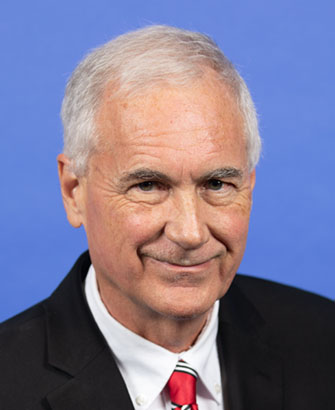
Official portrait, 2022

Tom McClintock is an American politician currently serving in the United States House of Representatives since 2009. McClintock served California's 4th congressional district from 2009 to 2023, and the 5th congressional district since 2023. Before his election to the House of Representatives, McClintock served in both chambers of the California State Legislature. He served in the California State Assembly from 1982 to 1992, and again from 1996 to 2000. He also served in the California State Senate from 2000 to 2008. Throughout McClintock's political career, he made several unsuccessful runs for various statewide offices in California, including Controller, Governor, and Lieutenant Governor.

== California State Assembly ==
1982 California State Assembly 36th district election
Party	Candidate	Votes	%
Republican	Tom McClintock	60,702	55.9
Democratic	Harriet Kosmo Henson	47,932	44.1
Total votes		108,634	100.0
Republican hold			

1984 California State Assembly 36th district election
Party	Candidate	Votes	%
Republican	Tom McClintock (incumbent)	94,391	71.5
Democratic	Tom Jolicoeur	37,610	28.5
Total votes		132,001	100.0
Republican hold			

1986 California State Assembly 36th district election
Party	Candidate	Votes	%
Republican	Tom McClintock (incumbent)	77,132	73.3
Democratic	Frank Nekimken	26,208	24.9
Libertarian	H. Bruce Driscoll	1,875	1.8
Total votes		105,215	100.0
Republican hold			

1988 California State Assembly 36th district election
Party	Candidate	Votes	%
Republican	Tom McClintock (incumbent)	101,012	70.0
Democratic	George Webb II	39,539	27.4
Libertarian	H. Bruce Driscoll	3,782	2.6
Total votes		144,333	100.0
Republican hold			

1990 California State Assembly 36th district election
Primary election
Party	Candidate	Votes	%
Republican	Tom McClintock (incumbent)	28,740	80.7
Republican	Kevin G. Staker	6,866	19.3
Total votes		35,606	100.0
General election
Republican	Tom McClintock (incumbent)	66,081	58.6
Democratic	Ginny Connell	40,356	35.8
Libertarian	David A. Harner	6,371	5.6
Total votes		112,808	100.0
Republican hold			

1996 California State Assembly 38th district election
Primary election
Party	Candidate	Votes	%
Republican	Tom McClintock	13,999	38.2
Republican	Ross Hopkins	7,425	20.3
Republican	Bob Larkin	4,774	13.0
Republican	Robert C. Hamlin	4,066	11.1
Republican	Stephen R. Frank	3,308	9.0
Republican	Peggy Freeman	3,093	8.4
Total votes		36,665	100.0
General election
Republican	Tom McClintock	71,597	55.5
Democratic	Jon M. Lauritzen	51,274	39.8
Natural Law	Virginia F. Neuman	6,021	4.7
Total votes		128,892	100.0
Republican hold			

1998 California State Assembly 38th district election
Party	Candidate	Votes	%
Republican	Tom McClintock (incumbent)	78,417	100.0
Total votes		78,417	100.0
Republican hold			

== California State Senate ==
2000 California State Senate 19th district election
Primary election
Party	Candidate	Votes	%
Republican	Tom McClintock	99,135	74.9
Republican	Judy Mikels	33,255	25.1
Total votes		132,390	100.0
General election
Republican	Tom McClintock	165,422	57.6
Democratic	Daniel R. Gonzalez	121,893	42.4
Total votes		287,315	100.0
Republican hold			

2004 California State Senate 19th district election
Primary election
Party	Candidate	Votes	%
Republican	Tom McClintock (incumbent)	99,301	100.0
Total votes		99,301	100.0
General election
Republican	Tom McClintock (incumbent)	233,365	60.8
Democratic	Paul Graber	151,085	39.2
Total votes		384,450	100.0
Republican hold			

== U.S. House of Representatives ==
1992 California's 24th congressional district election
Primary election
Party	Candidate	Votes	%
Republican	Tom McClintock	20,163	34.5
Republican	Sang R. Korman	13,884	23.7
Republican	Bill Spillane	10,679	18.2
Republican	Jim Salomon	4,382	7.5
Republican	Rob Meyer	2,889	4.9
Republican	Stephen M. Weiss	2,238	3.8
Republican	Nicholas T. Hariton	1,805	3.1
Republican	Robert Colaco	1,582	2.7
Republican	Harry Wachtel	902	1.5
Total votes		58,524	100.0
General election
Democratic	Anthony Beilenson	141,742	55.5
Republican	Tom McClintock	99,835	39.1
Peace and Freedom	John Paul Lindblad	13,690	5.4
Total votes		255,267	100.0
Republican hold			

2008 California's 4th congressional district election
Primary election
Party	Candidate	Votes	%
Republican	Tom McClintock	51,655	53.5
Republican	Doug Ose	37,802	39.2
Republican	Suzanne Jones	4,920	4.0
Republican	Theodore Terbolizard	2,249	2.3
Total votes		96,626	100.0
General election
Republican	Tom McClintock	185,790	50.3
Democratic	Charlie Brown	183,990	49.7
Total votes		369,780	100.0
Republican hold			

2010 California's 4th congressional district election
Primary election
Party	Candidate	Votes	%
Republican	Tom McClintock (incumbent)	89,443	78.5
Republican	Michael Babich	24,528	21.5
Total votes		113,971	100.0
General election
Republican	Tom McClintock (incumbent)	186,397	61.3
Democratic	Clint Curtis	95,653	31.5
Green	Benjamin "Ben" Emery	22,179	7.2
Total votes		304,229	100.0
Republican hold			

2012 California's 4th congressional district election
Primary election
Party	Candidate	Votes	%
Republican	Tom McClintock (incumbent)	114,311	64.8
Democratic	Jack Uppal	62,130	35.2
Total votes		176,441	100.0
General election
Republican	Tom McClintock (incumbent)	197,803	61.1
Democratic	Jack Uppal	125,885	38.9
Total votes		323,688	100.0
Republican hold			

2014 California's 4th congressional district election
Primary election
Party	Candidate	Votes	%
Republican	Tom McClintock (incumbent)	80,999	56.2
Republican	Arthur "Art" Moore	32,855	22.8
No party preference	Jeffrey D. Gerlach	30,300	21.0
Total votes		144,154	100.0
General election
Republican	Tom McClintock (incumbent)	126,784	60.0
Republican	Arthur "Art" Moore	84,350	40.0
Total votes		211,134	100.0
Republican hold			

2016 California's 4th congressional district election
Primary election
Party	Candidate	Votes	%
Republican	Tom McClintock (incumbent)	135,626	61.5
Democratic	Robert W. Derlet	60,574	27.5
Democratic	Sean White	24,460	11.1
Total votes		220,660	100.0
General election
Republican	Tom McClintock (incumbent)	220,133	62.7
Democratic	Robert W. Derlet	130,845	37.3
Total votes		350,879	100.0
Republican hold			

2018 California's 4th congressional district election
Primary election
Party	Candidate	Votes	%
Republican	Tom McClintock (incumbent)	109,679	51.8
Democratic	Jessica Morse	42,942	20.3
Democratic	Regina Bateson	26,303	12.4
Republican	Mitchell White	14,433	6.8
Democratic	Roza Calderon	13,621	6.4
Democratic	Robert Lawton	4,593	2.2
Total votes		211,571	100.0
General election
Republican	Tom McClintock (incumbent)	184,401	54.1
Democratic	Jessica Morse	156,253	45.9
Total votes		340,654	100.0
Republican hold			

2020 California's 4th congressional district election
Primary election
Party	Candidate	Votes	%
Republican	Tom McClintock (incumbent)	141,244	50.7
Democratic	Brynne S. Kennedy	110,771	39.8
Republican	Julianne Benzel	12,138	4.4
No party preference	Robert Lawton	4,848	1.7
Republican	Jamie Byers	4,822	1.7
Republican	Jacob Thomas	4,527	1.6
Total votes		278,350	100.0
General election
Republican	Tom McClintock (incumbent)	247,291	55.9
Democratic	Brynne S. Kennedy	194,731	44.1
Total votes		442,022	100.0
Republican hold			

2022 California's 5th congressional district election
Primary election
Party	Candidate	Votes	%
Republican	Tom McClintock (incumbent)	87,010	45.5
Democratic	Michael J. "Mike" Barkley	64,285	33.6
Republican	Nathan Magsig	25,299	13.2
No party preference	Steve Wozniak	6,045	3.2
Republican	David Main	5,927	3.1
Republican	Kelsten Charles Obert	2,864	1.5
Total votes		191,430	100.0
General election
Republican	Tom McClintock (incumbent)	173,524	61.3
Democratic	Michael J. "Mike" Barkley	109,506	38.7
Total votes		283,030	100.0
Republican gain from Democratic			

2024 California's 5th congressional district election
Primary election
Party	Candidate	Votes	%
Republican	Tom McClintock (incumbent)	118,958	58.5
Democratic	Michael J. "Mike" Barkley	66,680	32.8
No party preference	Steve Wozniak	17,636	8.7
Total votes		203,274	100.0
General election
Republican	Tom McClintock (incumbent)	227,643	61.8
Democratic	Michael J. "Mike" Barkley	140,919	38.2
Total votes		368,562	100.0
Republican hold			

== California Statewide Offices ==
1994 California State Controller election
Primary election
Party	Candidate	Votes	%
Republican	Tom McClintock	1,112,435	70.8
Republican	John Morris	717,681	39.2
Total votes		1,830,116	100.0
General election
Democratic	Kathleen Connell	3,983,053	48.3
Republican	Tom McClintock	3,796,387	46.1
Peace and Freedom	Elizabeth Nakano	182,836	2.2
American Independent	Nathan E. Johnson	152,356	1.8
Libertarian	Cullene Marie Lang	128,378	1.6
Total votes		8,243,010	100.0
Democratic hold			

2002 California State Controller election
Primary election
Party	Candidate	Votes	%
Republican	Tom McClintock	948,539	45.7
Republican	Dean Andal	736,317	35.5
Republican	W. Snow Hume	194,883	9.4
Republican	Nancy Beecham	194,583	9.4
Total votes		2,074,322	100.0
General election
Democratic	Steve Westly	3,289,839	45.3
Republican	Tom McClintock	3,273,028	45.1
Green	Laura Wells	419,873	5.8
Natural Law	J. Carlos Aguirre	179,999	2.5
American Independent	Ernest F. Vance	96,019	1.3
Total votes		7,258,758	100.0
Democratic hold			

2003 California gubernatorial recall election
Party	Candidate	Votes	%
Republican	Arnold Schwarzenegger	4,206,284	48.6
Democratic	Cruz Bustamante	2,724,874	31.5
Republican	Tom McClintock	1,161,287	13.4
Green	Peter Camejo	242,247	2.8
Independent	Arianna Huffington	47,505	0.5
	All Others	275,719	3.2
Total votes		8,657,916	100.0
Republican gain from Democratic			

2006 California lieutenant gubernatorial election
Primary election
Party	Candidate	Votes	%
Republican	Tom McClintock	1,760,667	93.8
Republican	Tony Farmer	117,335	6.2
Total votes		1,878,002	100.0
General election
Democratic	John Garamendi	4,189,584	49.1
Republican	Tom McClintock	3,845,858	45.1
Green	Donna Warren	239,107	2.8
Libertarian	Lynnette Shaw	142,851	1.7
American Independent	Jim King	68,446	0.8
Peace and Freedom	Stewart Alexander	43,319	0.5
Total votes		8,529,165	100.0
Democratic hold			
