= 1998 California State Controller election =

- November 3, 1998
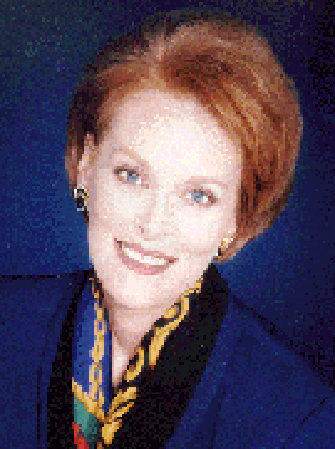

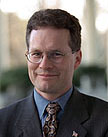
Nominee	Kathleen Connell	Ruben Barrales
Party	Democratic	Republican
Popular vote	4,875,969	2,653,153
Percentage	60.91%	33.14%
- County results Connell: 40–50% 50–60% 60–70% 70–80% Barrales: 40–50%
Controller before election
Kathleen Connell
Democratic
Elected Controller
Kathleen Connell
Democratic

The 1998 California State Controller election occurred on November 3, 1998. The primary elections took place on June 3, 1998. The Democratic incumbent, Kathleen Connell, defeated the Republican nominee, Ruben Barrales in a landslide, winning every county except three: Glenn, Kern, and Sutter. Every candidate was unopposed in the primary.

== Results ==
Final results from the Secretary of State of California.

1998 State Controller election, California
Party	Candidate	Votes	%
Democratic	Kathleen Connell (incumbent)	4,875,969	60.91
Republican	Ruben Barrales	2,653,153	33.14
Libertarian	Pamela Pescosolido	147,397	1.84
American Independent	Alfred "Al" L. Burgess	108,847	1.36
Reform	Denise L. Jackson	100,683	1.26
Peace and Freedom	C. T. Weber	68,738	0.86
Natural Law	Iris Adam	50,990	0.64
Invalid or blank votes		615,361	7.14
Total votes		8,005,777	100.00
Turnout			41.23
Democratic hold			

=== Results by county ===
Final results from the Secretary of State of California.

County	Connell	Votes	Barrales	Votes	Others	Votes
San Francisco	78.56%	171,562	15.02%	32,795	6.42%	14,039
Alameda	74.17%	270,518	19.81%	72,251	6.02%	21,945
Los Angeles	69.12%	1,316,570	26.06%	496,311	4.82%	91,826
Marin	68.86%	66,502	25.93%	25,042	5.21%	5,031
Santa Cruz	66.92%	54,112	23.97%	19,377	9.11%	7,366
Solano	65.17%	64,058	28.39%	27,907	6.44%	6,331
Sonoma	64.34%	98,043	27.90%	42,519	7.76%	11,829
Yolo	63.96%	31,225	30.02%	14,655	6.02%	2,938
Contra Costa	63.87%	180,837	30.37%	85,988	5.75%	16,288
Lake	62.87%	11,458	30.46%	5,551	6.67%	1,216
Santa Clara	62.55%	247,892	30.74%	121,837	6.71%	26,558
Monterey	62.25%	54,430	31.08%	27,176	6.67%	5,826
San Mateo	61.98%	122,172	33.14%	65,312	4.88%	9,619
Napa	61.24%	25,063	31.98%	13,089	6.77%	2,771
Merced	61.12%	23,495	33.86%	13,016	5.01%	1,927
Imperial	61.03%	13,866	32.15%	7,304	6.83%	1,551
San Benito	60.23%	7,517	32.51%	4,057	7.27%	907
Mendocino	59.76%	16,355	28.16%	7,707	12.08%	3,305
Humboldt	59.69%	26,119	28.75%	12,579	11.57%	5,062
San Joaquin	59.38%	71,027	35.66%	42,660	4.96%	5,929
San Bernardino	58.04%	187,167	35.82%	115,498	6.13%	19,806
Stanislaus	57.93%	55,947	37.39%	36,114	4.69%	4,524
Santa Barbara	57.92%	68,268	36.24%	42,715	5.84%	6,893
Alpine	57.85%	317	33.21%	182	8.93%	49
Del Norte	57.84%	4,115	33.18%	2,361	8.99%	639
Sacramento	57.57%	201,012	36.76%	128,345	5.67%	19,779
Ventura	57.40%	113,693	36.33%	71,971	6.27%	12,415
Tuolumne	56.85%	11,139	37.98%	7,442	5.17%	1,014
Amador	56.78%	7,379	38.07%	4,947	5.15%	669
Kings	55.99%	12,247	38.10%	8,333	5.93%	1,294
Riverside	55.12%	179,893	38.94%	127,062	5.94%	19,387
San Luis Obispo	54.30%	45,125	39.83%	33,098	5.88%	4,879
Calaveras	53.88%	8,447	38.83%	6,087	7.29%	1,142
San Diego	53.65%	373,986	39.54%	275,676	6.81%	47,466
Mono	52.70%	1,747	40.27%	1,335	7.03%	233
Fresno	52.60%	85,682	41.56%	67,694	5.84%	9,524
Trinity	52.53%	2,526	35.12%	1,689	12.35%	594
Plumas	52.06%	4,307	41.51%	3,434	6.43%	532
Lassen	51.94%	4,180	40.06%	3,224	8.00%	644
Colusa	51.63%	2,433	43.59%	2,054	4.77%	225
Tulare	51.58%	36,664	42.68%	30,336	5.74%	4,078
Siskiyou	51.29%	8,155	41.08%	6,532	7.63%	1,214
Yuba	51.03%	6,694	41.75%	5,477	7.22%	946
Tehama	50.77%	9,045	40.82%	7,273	8.42%	1,498
Madera	50.56%	12,948	43.33%	11,097	6.11%	1,563
Mariposa	50.42%	3,492	41.63%	2,883	7.96%	551
Butte	49.68%	31,291	43.28%	27,258	7.04%	4,435
Orange	49.32%	332,375	44.30%	298,543	6.39%	43,058
Nevada	49.32%	18,544	44.33%	16,670	6.35%	2,389
Sierra	49.14%	826	39.20%	659	11.66%	196
Inyo	49.02%	3,197	43.85%	2,860	7.13%	465
El Dorado	48.30%	27,060	45.38%	25,424	6.31%	3,538
Placer	48.29%	40,929	46.42%	39,346	5.29%	4,478
Modoc	48.26%	1,634	43.15%	1,461	8.59%	291
Kern	46.91%	63,500	47.14%	63,812	5.94%	8,053
Shasta	46.44%	24,007	45.25%	23,393	8.32%	4,299
Sutter	46.19%	9,829	48.37%	10,293	5.45%	1,159
Glenn	46.10%	3,348	47.40%	3,442	6.50%	472

== See also ==
- California state elections, 1998
- State of California
- Secretary of State of California
