= 2002 California State Controller election =

- November 5, 2002
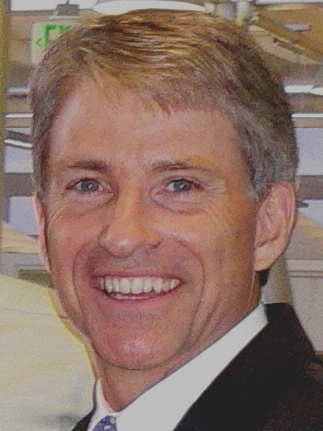

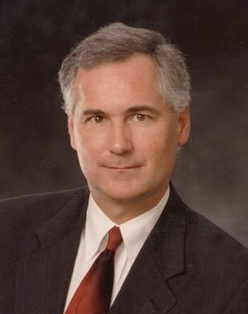

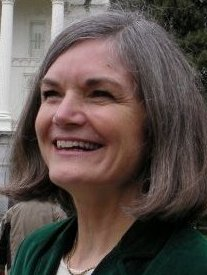
Nominee	Steve Westly	Tom McClintock	Laura Wells
Party	Democratic	Republican	Green
Popular vote	3,289,839	3,273,028	419,873
Percentage	45.32%	45.09%	5.78%
- County results Westly: 40–50% 50–60% 60–70% McClintock: 40–50% 50–60% 60–70%
Controller before election
Kathleen Connell
Democratic
Elected Controller
Steve Westly
Democratic

The 2002 California State Controller election was on November 5, 2002. The primary elections took place on March 5, 2002. Businessman Steve Westly, the Democratic nominee, narrowly defeated the Republican nominee, Senator Tom McClintock, for the office previously held by Kathleen Connell, who was term-limited.

== Primary results ==
A bar graph of statewide results in this contest are available at https://web.archive.org/web/20080905210455/http://primary2002.ss.ca.gov/Returns/ctl/00.htm.

Results by county are available here and here.

=== Democratic ===
==== Candidates ====
Steve Westly, Venture Capitalist

Johan Klehs, Member of The State Board of Equalization

California State Controller Democratic primary, 2002
Candidate	Votes	%
Steve Westly	1,137,396	56.51
Johan Klehs	875,463	43.49
Total votes	2,012,859	100.00

=== Republican ===
==== Candidates ====
Tom McClintock, State Senator, nominee for CA-24 in 1992 and nominee for Controller in 1994

Dean Andal, Former Assemblyman

W. Snow Hume

Nancy Beecham

California State Controller Republican primary, 2002
Candidate	Votes	%
Tom McClintock	948,539	45.73
Dean Andal	736,317	35.50
W. Snow Hume	194,883	9.40
Nancy Beecham	194,583	9.38
Total votes	2,074,322	100.00

=== Green ===
California State Controller Green primary, 2002
Candidate	Votes	%
Laura Wells	29,457	84.12
David Delano Blanco	5,561	15.88
Total votes	35,018	100.00

=== Others ===
California State Controller primary, 2002 (Others)
Party	Candidate	Votes	%
American Independent	Ernest F. Vance	25,677	100.00
Natural Law	J. Carlos Aguirre	4,464	100.00

== Results ==
California State Controller election, 2002
Party	Candidate	Votes	%
Democratic	Steve Westly	3,289,839	45.32
Republican	Tom McClintock	3,273,028	45.09
Green	Laura Wells	419,873	5.78
Natural Law	J. Carlos Aguirre	179,999	2.48
American Independent	Ernest F. Vance	96,019	1.32
Invalid or blank votes		480,063	6.20
Total votes		7,258,758	100.00
Turnout			36.05
Democratic hold			

=== Results by county ===
Results from the Secretary of State of California:

County	Westly	Votes	McClintock	Votes	Wells	Votes	Aguirre	Votes	Vance	Votes
San Francisco	64.26%	129,048	22.26%	44,700	10.52%	21,124	2.17%	4,357	0.79%	1,579
Alameda	59.36%	196,859	28.37%	94,072	9.64%	31,972	1.71%	5,677	0.92%	3,058
Marin	54.50%	47,017	34.25%	29,546	9.77%	8,430	0.77%	661	0.71%	611
Los Angeles	54.18%	898,440	36.10%	598,694	5.08%	84,270	3.47%	57,542	1.17%	19,356
Santa Cruz	53.23%	40,292	30.49%	23,084	12.91%	9,775	2.08%	1,578	1.28%	972
Santa Clara	52.76%	184,012	38.03%	132,638	5.98%	20,866	1.99%	6,946	1.23%	4,280
San Mateo	52.39%	87,063	37.07%	61,611	7.38%	12,261	2.22%	3,689	0.94%	1,566
Sonoma	50.67%	71,927	35.32%	50,129	10.99%	15,595	1.49%	2,119	1.53%	2,176
Monterey	49.88%	42,049	40.13%	33,828	5.47%	4,607	3.23%	2,721	1.29%	1,087
Solano	49.62%	43,080	41.45%	35,989	5.03%	4,369	2.13%	1,851	1.77%	1,537
Yolo	48.92%	22,004	39.07%	17,571	8.46%	3,807	2.27%	1,019	1.28%	574
Contra Costa	47.77%	119,554	43.02%	107,656	6.44%	16,109	1.67%	4,171	1.11%	2,781
Napa	47.21%	16,823	42.57%	15,169	6.99%	2,490	1.60%	570	1.62%	579
Lake	46.33%	7,283	43.49%	6,836	6.76%	1,063	1.58%	248	1.84%	290
San Benito	44.98%	5,402	45.24%	5,433	4.84%	581	3.80%	456	1.14%	137
Mendocino	44.39%	10,839	35.99%	8,789	16.41%	4,007	1.42%	346	1.80%	439
Imperial	44.04%	9,217	41.95%	8,781	4.16%	871	8.33%	1,744	1.51%	317
Sacramento	43.72%	135,970	47.11%	146,538	6.03%	18,769	1.77%	5,502	1.37%	4,255
Merced	42.56%	17,025	49.52%	19,809	3.28%	1,312	3.21%	1,286	1.43%	571
Humboldt	42.45%	17,661	40.00%	16,645	15.43%	6,420	1.16%	483	0.96%	399
Santa Barbara	40.84%	45,146	48.66%	53,799	7.01%	7,751	2.32%	2,561	1.18%	1,300
Alpine	40.56%	219	42.96%	232	10.93%	59	2.22%	12	3.33%	18
San Joaquin	40.42%	48,617	51.12%	61,490	4.21%	5,065	2.77%	3,330	1.48%	1,775
San Diego	40.02%	254,818	51.63%	328,780	4.57%	29,121	2.36%	15,008	1.42%	9,051
Stanislaus	40.02%	37,470	51.93%	48,619	4.28%	4,005	2.28%	2,139	1.49%	1,396
Del Norte	39.70%	2,596	49.99%	3,269	6.32%	413	1.44%	94	2.55%	167
San Bernardino	38.76%	107,444	52.25%	144,853	4.17%	11,560	3.15%	8,731	1.68%	4,650
Riverside	37.77%	112,833	54.77%	163,626	3.75%	11,189	2.29%	6,839	1.43%	4,264
Fresno	37.60%	57,443	54.28%	82,924	4.35%	6,643	2.68%	4,101	1.08%	1,650
Ventura	37.43%	70,613	53.74%	101,384	4.68%	8,821	2.81%	5,297	1.34%	2,524
San Luis Obispo	36.59%	29,232	53.39%	42,653	7.01%	5,598	1.35%	1,077	1.67%	1,335
Tuolumne	36.26%	6,463	55.08%	9,819	5.92%	1,056	1.07%	190	1.67%	298
Kings	36.14%	7,592	56.61%	11,893	3.46%	727	2.51%	527	1.28%	268
Amador	35.31%	4,524	55.84%	7,155	5.88%	753	1.24%	159	1.74%	223
Trinity	34.51%	1,651	52.40%	2,507	8.88%	425	1.46%	70	2.74%	131
Tehama	34.41%	5,186	57.44%	8,656	3.80%	573	1.55%	233	2.80%	422
Butte	33.96%	20,391	54.23%	32,564	8.32%	4,996	1.59%	953	1.90%	1,142
Tulare	33.07%	20,542	59.69%	37,075	3.22%	2,000	2.77%	1,722	1.25%	776
Mono	32.97%	960	54.70%	1,593	9.00%	262	1.61%	47	1.72%	50
Nevada	32.45%	12,508	54.83%	21,134	9.61%	3,703	1.47%	566	1.65%	637
Calaveras	32.36%	4,794	56.52%	8,374	7.45%	1,103	1.35%	200	2.32%	344
Madera	32.39%	8,340	60.29%	15,524	3.84%	988	2.09%	538	1.39%	359
Yuba	32.23%	3,656	58.84%	6,674	4.59%	521	2.00%	227	2.34%	265
Shasta	32.12%	15,456	60.54%	29,135	3.92%	1,886	1.10%	531	2.31%	1,114
Kern	31.71%	42,263	59.98%	79,936	3.25%	4,336	3.02%	4,030	2.04%	2,715
Orange	31.78%	197,416	60.15%	373,701	4.23%	26,292	2.41%	14,978	1.43%	8,867
Plumas	31.69%	2,456	58.01%	4,495	6.36%	493	1.74%	135	2.19%	170
Placer	31.34%	29,701	61.62%	58,396	4.88%	4,626	0.98%	932	1.17%	1,106
Siskiyou	31.30%	4,741	59.01%	8,937	5.45%	826	1.58%	240	2.65%	401
El Dorado	31.25%	16,934	60.15%	32,598	5.86%	3,175	1.14%	618	1.60%	867
Inyo	31.13%	1,905	59.49%	3,641	5.59%	342	1.62%	99	2.17%	133
Mariposa	30.71%	1,952	59.29%	3,769	6.89%	438	1.18%	75	1.93%	123
Lassen	30.43%	2,312	61.19%	4,649	4.11%	312	1.42%	108	2.86%	217
Sierra	30.04%	419	57.99%	809	6.16%	86	2.08%	29	3.73%	52
Sutter	30.06%	5,629	63.20%	11,834	3.07%	574	1.99%	373	1.68%	314
Colusa	29.75%	1,322	63.22%	2,809	3.04%	135	2.09%	93	1.89%	84
Glenn	29.26%	1,863	63.37%	4,035	3.00%	191	2.12%	135	2.25%	143
Modoc	26.22%	867	65.59%	2,169	3.96%	131	1.09%	36	3.14%	104

== See also ==
- California state elections, 2002
- State of California
- California State Controller
