= 2006 California Insurance Commissioner election =

- November 7, 2006
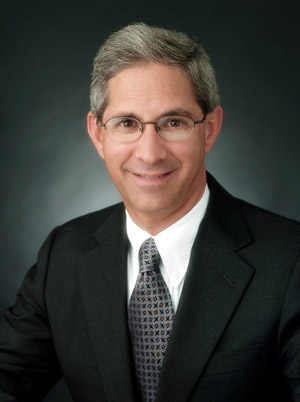

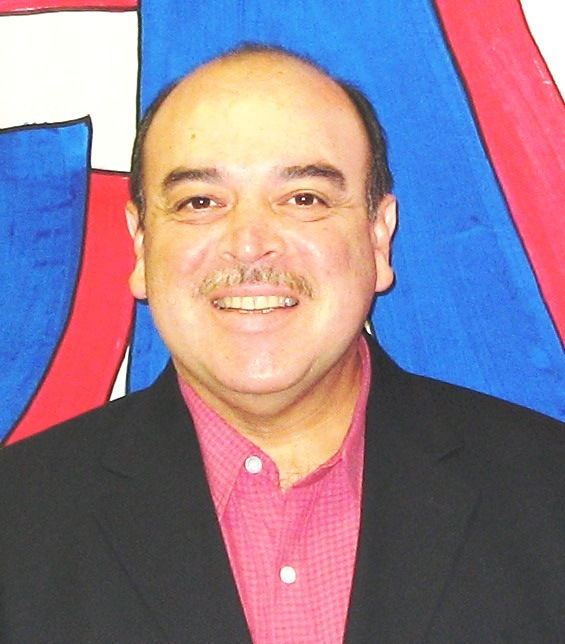
Nominee	Steve Poizner	Cruz Bustamante
Party	Republican	Democratic
Popular vote	4,229,986	3,204,536
Percentage	50.81%	38.49%
- County results Poizner: 40–50% 50–60% 60–70% Bustamante: 40–50% 50–60%
Com. before election
John Garamendi
Democratic
Elected Com.
Steve Poizner
Republican

The 2006 California Insurance Commissioner election occurred on November 7, 2006. The primary elections took place on June 6, 2006. Businessman Steve Poizner, the Republican nominee, defeated Lieutenant Governor Cruz Bustamante, the Democratic nominee, for the office previously held by Democrat John Garamendi, who was term-limited and ran for lieutenant governor. Poizner is the only Republican other than Governor Arnold Schwarzenegger to win a statewide election in California since 1998. This is the most recent time a Republican was elected the state’s Insurance Commissioner.

== Primary results ==
A bar graph of statewide results in this contest are available at https://web.archive.org/web/20070517094430/http://primary2006.ss.ca.gov/Returns/ins/00.htm.

Results by county are available here and here.

=== Democratic ===
California Insurance Commissioner Democratic primary, 2006
Candidate	Votes	%
Cruz Bustamante	1,651,858	70.43
John Kraft	693,662	29.57
Total votes	2,345,520	100.00

=== Others ===
California Insurance Commissioner primary, 2006 (Others)
Party	Candidate	Votes	%
Republican	Steve Poizner	1,519,054	100.00
Green	Larry Cafiero	30,742	100.00
American Independent	Jay Earl Burden	29,278	100.00
Libertarian	Dale Ogden	16,760	100.00
Peace and Freedom	Tom Condit	3,850	100.00

== Results ==
California Insurance Commissioner election, 2006
Party	Candidate	Votes	%
Republican	Steve Poizner	4,229,986	50.81
Democratic	Cruz Bustamante	3,204,536	38.49
Libertarian	Dale Ogden	305,772	3.67
Green	Larry Cafiero	270,218	3.25
Peace and Freedom	Tom Condit	187,618	2.25
American Independent	Jay Earl Burden	127,267	1.53
Invalid or blank votes		573,662	6.45
Total votes		8,325,397	100.00
Turnout			39.29
Republican gain from Democratic			

=== Results by county ===
Results from the Secretary of State of California:

County	Poizner	Votes	Bustamante	Votes	Ogden	Votes	Cafiero	Votes	Condit	Votes	Burden	Votes
Glenn	67.32%	4,919	23.21%	1,696	3.82%	279	1.63%	119	1.74%	127	2.29%	167
Placer	66.29%	78,613	23.91%	28,355	3.84%	4,553	2.65%	3,148	1.97%	2,334	1.34%	1,587
Shasta	65.85%	37,735	23.98%	13,742	3.99%	2,288	2.02%	1,158	1.98%	1,137	2.17%	1,241
Colusa	65.88%	3,047	27.01%	1,249	2.68%	124	1.28%	59	1.51%	70	1.64%	76
Madera	64.67%	19,121	25.78%	7,622	3.24%	959	2.05%	607	2.73%	806	1.53%	453
Tulare	64.64%	43,806	28.12%	19,057	2.56%	1,736	1.57%	1,066	1.69%	1,145	1.42%	961
Kern	64.61%	95,434	27.01%	39,891	3.60%	5,317	1.39%	2,057	1.46%	2,157	1.93%	2,853
Tehama	64.53%	11,425	24.14%	4,275	4.19%	742	2.04%	361	2.21%	392	2.89%	511
Sutter	64.39%	14,963	26.62%	6,186	3.52%	818	1.70%	395	1.64%	380	2.13%	496
El Dorado	64.10%	41,865	24.28%	15,859	4.06%	2,650	3.70%	2,417	2.35%	1,538	1.51%	986
Orange	63.62%	447,911	26.36%	185,561	4.19%	29,487	2.19%	15,384	2.12%	14,896	1.53%	10,789
Modoc	63.54%	2,293	23.72%	856	5.85%	211	2.77%	100	2.22%	80	1.91%	69
Amador	62.84%	9,100	25.30%	3,664	4.11%	595	2.97%	430	2.99%	433	1.80%	260
Kings	61.93%	13,883	30.38%	6,811	3.46%	776	1.20%	268	1.63%	366	1.40%	314
Yuba	61.25%	8,321	26.43%	3,591	4.39%	596	2.74%	372	2.45%	333	2.75%	373
Plumas	60.54%	5,202	27.85%	2,393	4.07%	350	3.37%	290	2.34%	201	1.83%	157
Calaveras	60.41%	10,561	25.75%	4,502	5.46%	954	3.83%	669	2.58%	451	1.97%	344
Riverside	59.62%	223,693	31.42%	117,904	3.33%	12,488	1.94%	7,264	2.09%	7,854	1.60%	5,999
Tuolumne	59.69%	12,251	27.62%	5,668	4.74%	973	3.12%	641	3.11%	638	1.72%	352
Fresno	59.51%	102,290	31.81%	54,678	3.18%	5,461	2.04%	3,501	2.36%	4,054	1.11%	1,907
Mariposa	58.71%	4,372	28.13%	2,095	5.08%	378	3.40%	253	2.95%	220	1.73%	129
Butte	58.63%	39,400	28.26%	18,993	4.29%	2,881	3.99%	2,681	2.65%	1,781	2.18%	1,466
Inyo	57.84%	3,617	29.19%	1,825	4.69%	293	3.60%	225	2.72%	170	1.97%	123
Nevada	57.46%	23,782	29.72%	12,302	4.47%	1,852	5.05%	2,091	1.98%	818	1.31%	542
Lassen	57.06%	4,787	31.53%	2,645	5.33%	447	1.94%	163	1.94%	163	2.21%	185
San Bernardino	56.83%	190,127	33.07%	110,614	3.73%	12,475	1.99%	6,648	2.20%	7,365	2.18%	7,305
Stanislaus	56.78%	57,298	33.64%	33,946	3.35%	3,378	1.76%	1,771	2.88%	2,903	1.59%	1,609
Sierra	56.76%	878	27.47%	425	6.40%	99	4.07%	63	2.97%	46	2.33%	36
San Luis Obispo	56.76%	52,958	32.57%	30,386	3.60%	3,362	3.05%	2,847	2.32%	2,166	1.69%	1,580
San Diego	56.28%	417,746	33.97%	252,140	3.95%	29,354	2.51%	18,667	1.85%	13,745	1.43%	10,594
Ventura	56.16%	119,880	34.10%	72,781	4.10%	8,747	2.51%	5,360	1.81%	3,873	1.32%	2,809
Sacramento	54.53%	189,051	34.03%	117,965	3.21%	11,137	3.54%	12,287	2.99%	10,351	1.70%	5,896
Merced	54.51%	22,358	35.67%	14,629	2.34%	959	2.14%	879	4.09%	1,677	1.25%	514
Siskiyou	54.28%	8,781	33.31%	5,389	4.85%	784	2.57%	416	2.57%	415	2.42%	391
San Joaquin	52.06%	70,429	38.06%	51,497	3.44%	4,651	2.13%	2,882	2.51%	3,397	1.80%	2,440
Trinity	52.00%	2,892	30.49%	1,696	7.35%	409	5.50%	306	2.84%	158	1.82%	101
San Benito	51.04%	7,176	38.42%	5,402	3.61%	508	2.80%	393	2.77%	389	1.36%	191
Santa Clara	50.81%	211,203	39.00%	162,095	3.61%	15,001	3.21%	13,330	2.19%	9,099	1.19%	4,948
Napa	50.83%	20,989	36.81%	15,199	4.23%	1,748	4.54%	1,875	2.19%	905	1.39%	576
Del Norte	50.75%	3,335	37.81%	2,485	4.98%	327	2.78%	183	1.77%	116	1.92%	126
Mono	49.82%	1,806	37.60%	1,363	4.97%	180	3.64%	132	2.70%	98	1.27%	46
Contra Costa	49.74%	144,933	39.83%	116,051	2.59%	7,557	3.73%	10,882	2.61%	7,598	1.50%	4,362
Lake	49.61%	9,452	35.91%	6,842	4.84%	923	4.24%	808	3.12%	595	2.26%	431
Santa Barbara	49.44%	57,791	39.64%	46,336	4.08%	4,773	3.25%	3,802	2.26%	2,640	1.34%	1,561
Monterey	47.27%	40,443	41.34%	35,364	3.79%	3,239	3.55%	3,033	2.47%	2,115	1.59%	1,356
Marin	47.14%	47,497	40.19%	40,497	3.83%	3,860	5.67%	5,714	2.39%	2,410	0.78%	785
Solano	46.85%	46,939	42.31%	42,393	4.02%	4,028	2.62%	2,625	2.22%	2,222	1.98%	1,984
San Mateo	46.90%	91,929	42.69%	83,693	2.86%	5,599	4.11%	8,050	2.34%	4,593	1.10%	2,162
Yolo	45.20%	23,305	42.11%	21,711	4.12%	2,122	5.38%	2,775	2.08%	1,070	1.12%	576
Sonoma	44.88%	75,160	40.25%	67,410	4.36%	7,300	5.77%	9,664	3.25%	5,436	1.49%	2,493
Los Angeles	42.01%	786,131	47.64%	891,354	3.66%	68,543	3.02%	56,563	2.06%	38,601	1.60%	29,893
Humboldt	41.71%	19,411	41.95%	19,523	4.36%	2,031	7.87%	3,663	2.61%	1,217	1.49%	695
Mendocino	40.01%	11,900	42.67%	12,689	5.13%	1,526	7.13%	2,119	3.37%	1,001	1.70%	505
Alpine	39.29%	200	46.37%	236	5.70%	29	3.34%	17	3.54%	18	1.77%	9
Santa Cruz	38.80%	33,445	45.44%	39,168	3.94%	3,394	7.20%	6,208	3.12%	2,690	1.49%	1,287
Imperial	38.35%	8,383	52.74%	11,529	2.96%	646	1.41%	308	2.53%	552	2.03%	443
Alameda	34.19%	132,311	52.29%	202,363	3.21%	12,410	6.15%	23,820	2.81%	10,894	1.35%	5,222
San Francisco	27.94%	61,458	58.16%	127,945	3.39%	7,465	7.46%	16,409	2.15%	4,719	0.91%	2,001

== See also ==
- 2006 California elections
- State of California
- California Insurance Commissioner
