= Mickey Ibarra =

American government official (born 1951)

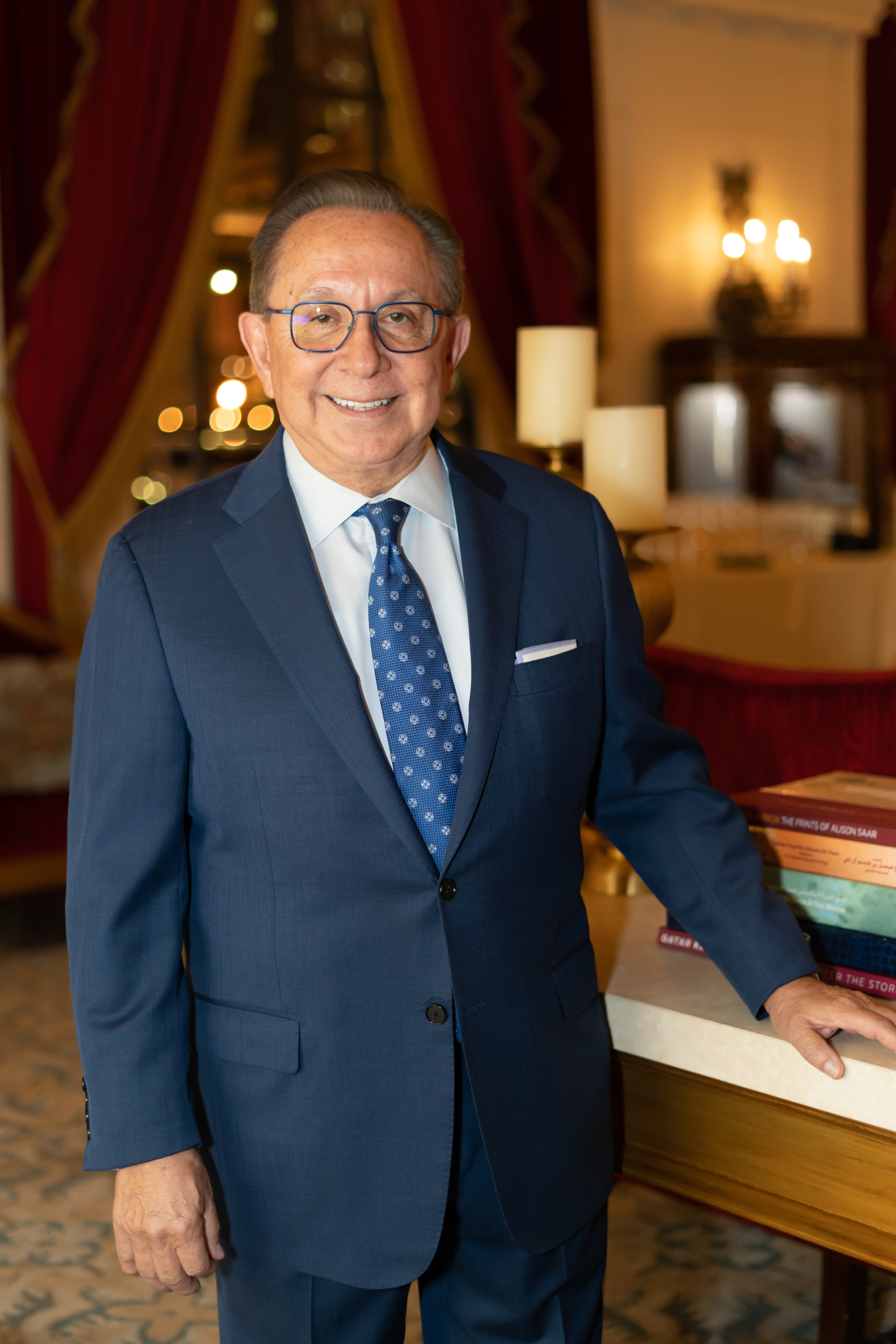

Director of the White House Office of Intergovernmental Affairs
- In office May 16, 1997 – January 20, 2001
- President: Bill Clinton
- Preceded by: Marcia Hale
- Succeeded by: Ruben Barrales

Personal details
- Born: Salt Lake City, Utah, U.S.
- Party: Democratic
- Education: Brigham Young University (BA); University of Utah (MEd)

Mickey Ibarra (born 1951) is the former Director of the Office of Intergovernmental Affairs under President Bill Clinton. He was born in Salt Lake City, Utah, the son of a Mexican immigrant father and an American mother.

== Background ==
His father, Francisco Nicolas Santiago Ibarra, first came to the United States as a bracero from Oaxaca, Mexico in 1945. He picked fruits at Spanish Fork, Utah. Later, he worked at the Kennecott Copper Mine as a demolition crew member—a union job with better benefits and job security.

The marriage between his Mexican father and younger, white Mormon mother, Bonnie Bird, ended in divorce when he was two years old. His mother, who was 18 at the time, and his father relinquished custody of Mickey and his younger brother David to the Children's Service Society of Utah. Together, they were placed in foster care for most of the first fifteen years of his life.

Mickey Ibarra served in the United States Army from 1970 to 1973. He received his undergraduate degree in political science from Brigham Young University, with the assistance of the G.I. Bill for his military service. He also earned a master's degree in education from the University of Utah and was awarded an honorary doctorate of humane letters in 2007.

== Career ==
Mickey Ibarra is the president of the Ibarra Strategy Group, a government relations and public affairs firm based in Washington, D.C.

He began teaching in Utah County in 1977 at a public alternative high school for at-risk students, and then moved his teaching responsibilities to Salt Lake County. He attended the University of Utah while he continued teaching – a part-time arrangement he notes that discourages many teachers from continuing their education throughout their careers.

Ibarra taught at-risk high school students for five years in the Utah public schools. As a teacher, Ibarra became involved in the Utah Education Association and later with the National Education Association (NEA). From the NEA's state office in New Mexico, he moved to the headquarters in Washington, D.C., in 1984. By 1990, he was the political manager at the NEA. His responsibilities there included assisting with campaign strategy development, federal candidate support, political education, and state government affairs. He also served as the senior adviser and director of special projects for the Clinton-Gore '96 campaign.

At the White House, Mr. Ibarra was responsible for building support for the President's policy initiatives and responding to the concerns of state and local elected officials as well as the U.S. Territories and Indian nations. In 1998, President Clinton appointed Ibarra to serve as a vice-chair of the White House Task Force for the 2002, Salt Lake Winter Olympic Games. He was named an honorary mayor for the Para-Olympic Games. Additionally, he co-chaired the White House Task Force on Drug Use in Sports.

== Community work ==
Mickey Ibarra is the founder and chairman of the Latino Leaders Network, a non-profit organization. Since 2004, the Latino Leaders Network has convened 92 signature events—the Tribute to Mayors and the Latino Leaders Luncheon Series across the country. He is the editor of Latino Leaders Speak: Personal Stories of Struggle and Triumph, published by Arte Publico Press at the University of Houston.

He served six years on the board of directors of MALDEF, heads the Latino Leaders Network (a non-profit organization dedicated to bringing leaders together), and assists the Ibarra Foundation.

In 2008, Hispanic Magazine named him among the "25 Most Powerful Hispanics in Washington, D.C."

== Awards ==
On behalf of the Mexican government and the Consul of Mexico, Ibarra was presented the Ohtli Award on May 4, 2018.

Political offices
Preceded by Marcia Hale	Director of the White House Office of Intergovernmental Affairs; 1997–2001	Succeeded by Ruben Barrales
