= 2006 California lieutenant gubernatorial election =

- November 7, 2006
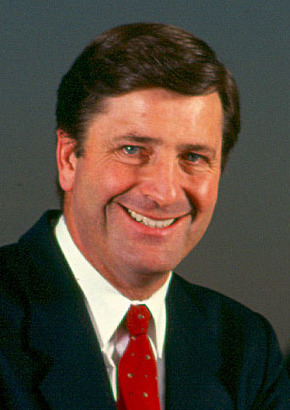

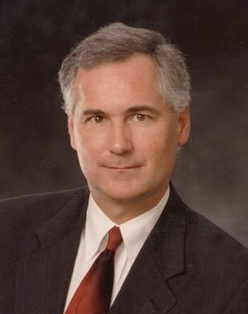
Nominee	John Garamendi	Tom McClintock
Party	Democratic	Republican
Popular vote	4,189,584	3,845,858
Percentage	49.12%	45.09%
- County results Garamendi: 40–50% 50–60% 60–70% 70–80% McClintock: 40–50% 50–60% 60–70%
Lt. Governor before election
Cruz Bustamante
Democratic
Elected Lt. Governor
John Garamendi
Democratic

The 2006 California lieutenant gubernatorial election occurred on November 7, 2006. Insurance Commissioner John Garamendi, the Democratic nominee, defeated the Republican nominee, State Senator Tom McClintock, to succeed incumbent Cruz Bustamante, who was term-limited and ran for Insurance Commissioner.

== Primary results ==
The primary elections took place on June 6. A bar graph of statewide results in this contest are available at https://web.archive.org/web/20070517094419/http://primary2006.ss.ca.gov/Returns/ltg/00.htm.

Results by county are available here and here.

=== Democratic ===
==== Candidates ====
- John Garamendi, Incumbent Insurance Commissioner, and candidate for governor in 1982, 1994, and 2003
- Jackie Speier, State Senator
- Liz Figueroa, State Senator

California Lt. Governor Democratic primary, 2006
Candidate	Votes	%
John Garamendi	1,045,130	42.53
Jackie Speier	975,547	39.70
Liz Figueroa	436,868	17.78
Total votes	2,457,545	100.00

=== Republican ===
California Lt. Governor Republican primary, 2006
Candidate	Votes	%
Tom McClintock	1,760,667	93.75
Tony Farmer	117,335	6.25
Total votes	1,878,002	100.00

=== Others ===
California Lt. Governor primary, 2006 (Others)
Party	Candidate	Votes	%
Green	Donna Warren	31,162	100.00
American Independent	Jim King	29,014	100.00
Libertarian	Lynette Shaw	16,128	100.00
Peace and Freedom	Stewart Alexander	3,549	100.00

== Results ==
California lieutenant governor election, 2006
Party	Candidate	Votes	%
Democratic	John Garamendi	4,189,584	49.12%
Republican	Tom McClintock	3,845,858	45.09%
Green	Donna Warren	239,107	2.80%
Libertarian	Lynnette Shaw	142,851	1.67%
American Independent	Jim King	68,446	0.80%
Peace and Freedom	Stewart Alexander	43,319	0.51%
Invalid or blank votes		369,894	4.16%
Total votes		8,529,165	100.00%
Turnout			39.29%
Democratic hold			

=== By county ===
Results from the Secretary of State of California:

County	Garamendi	Votes	McClintock	Votes	Warren	Votes	Others	Votes
San Francisco	74.15%	175,882	17.65%	41,871	5.32%	12,629	2.87%	6,828
Alameda	68.48%	270,885	25.46%	100,689	4.49%	17,777	2.72%	10,741
Marin	64.85%	67,170	28.94%	29,978	3.98%	4,126	3.05%	3,159
Santa Cruz	63.30%	55,352	28.59%	25,001	5.64%	4,935	3.56%	3,117
San Mateo	62.67%	125,199	32.50%	64,934	3.52%	7,033	2.24%	4,482
Sonoma	60.70%	103,019	32.59%	55,320	4.60%	7,808	3.51%	5,962
Los Angeles	58.82%	1,116,151	37.03%	702,553	2.50%	47,463	3.19%	60,531
Santa Clara	57.61%	238,352	37.56%	155,389	2.91%	12,050	3.27%	13,509
Contra Costa	56.90%	167,965	38.81%	114,567	2.84%	8,387	2.62%	7,751
Yolo	54.05%	28,845	40.83%	21,793	3.72%	1,983	1.94%	1,035
Mendocino	54.09%	16,179	35.58%	10,641	7.11%	2,128	4.76%	1,422
Monterey	53.67%	45,809	41.29%	35,239	3.21%	2,742	3.34%	2,852
Solano	53.22%	54,105	42.87%	43,590	2.45%	2,493	2.61%	2,653
Napa	52.81%	21,858	41.89%	17,337	3.62%	1,500	2.88%	1,195
Humboldt	50.21%	23,595	39.56%	18,592	7.31%	3,435	4.27%	2,005
Alpine	48.95%	257	42.67%	224	4.76%	25	3.81%	20
Imperial	49.16%	10,334	44.58%	9,372	4.10%	862	5.47%	1,151
San Benito	48.32%	6,745	47.31%	6,604	2.62%	366	3.51%	489
San Joaquin	47.97%	65,145	48.43%	65,762	2.01%	2,731	2.84%	3,857
Lake	47.51%	9,018	45.55%	8,647	4.27%	811	4.58%	867
Sacramento	47.19%	165,252	48.34%	169,300	2.89%	10,129	2.89%	10,124
Santa Barbara	44.69%	53,443	50.41%	60,275	3.03%	3,625	2.92%	3,489
Mono	44.58%	1,636	49.65%	1,822	3.16%	116	3.96%	145
Merced	44.50%	18,089	51.61%	20,977	2.01%	817	3.83%	1,559
Stanislaus	43.19%	44,106	53.75%	54,885	1.84%	1,878	2.29%	2,330
Del Norte	42.58%	2,761	51.62%	3,347	3.01%	195	4.85%	315
Calaveras	42.21%	7,513	53.67%	9,553	2.38%	424	2.82%	502
San Diego	41.60%	311,988	54.10%	405,673	2.58%	19,369	2.94%	22,008
Ventura	41.32%	89,988	55.14%	120,089	2.03%	4,429	2.48%	5,397
San Bernardino	41.45%	138,032	54.29%	180,824	2.37%	7,909	3.64%	12,126
Tuolumne	40.65%	8,491	55.14%	11,517	2.56%	534	2.66%	555
San Luis Obispo	39.68%	37,591	55.46%	52,536	3.13%	2,964	2.69%	2,545
Nevada	39.07%	16,613	54.73%	23,275	4.11%	1,749	2.60%	1,105
Fresno	39.14%	67,506	57.15%	98,580	2.20%	3,792	2.84%	4,882
Trinity	38.74%	2,199	51.92%	2,947	5.39%	306	5.06%	287
Amador	38.72%	5,697	57.41%	8,448	2.26%	333	2.78%	409
Riverside	38.72%	144,014	57.42%	213,564	2.07%	7,712	3.52%	13,119
Butte	37.53%	25,282	56.07%	37,774	4.15%	2,797	3.70%	2,497
Mariposa	36.81%	2,749	57.97%	4,330	3.07%	229	3.54%	264
Kings	35.59%	7,925	61.11%	13,608	1.90%	422	3.04%	678
Siskiyou	35.12%	5,700	59.16%	9,602	3.04%	493	4.32%	700
Plumas	35.01%	3,047	60.00%	5,221	2.86%	249	3.51%	305
Orange	34.41%	244,176	61.94%	439,549	2.10%	14,911	2.69%	19,038
Inyo	34.55%	2,165	59.14%	3,706	3.42%	214	4.90%	307
El Dorado	33.96%	22,634	61.48%	40,982	2.77%	1,845	2.71%	1,808
Placer	33.58%	40,770	62.67%	76,098	2.27%	2,759	2.31%	2,795
Madera	33.67%	9,988	62.92%	18,665	1.85%	550	2.83%	839
Tulare	32.83%	22,240	64.29%	43,553	1.66%	1,122	2.55%	1,722
Yuba	31.70%	4,283	62.69%	8,470	3.42%	462	3.96%	534
Lassen	30.97%	2,613	63.71%	5,376	2.89%	244	3.65%	308
Sutter	30.81%	7,166	65.99%	15,347	1.80%	419	2.80%	653
Colusa	30.42%	1,470	66.73%	3,225	1.82%	88	2.44%	118
Kern	30.36%	44,516	66.17%	97,035	1.96%	2,869	2.94%	4,319
Tehama	30.55%	5,345	65.47%	11,454	1.85%	324	4.15%	726
Shasta	30.08%	17,231	65.76%	37,668	2.18%	1,249	3.52%	2,016
Sierra	29.60%	462	63.61%	993	4.16%	65	4.16%	65
Glenn	28.00%	2,052	68.27%	5,003	1.87%	137	3.36%	246
Modoc	26.87%	986	67.68%	2,484	2.56%	94	4.22%	155

== See also ==
- 2006 California elections
- State of California
- Lieutenant Governor of California
- List of lieutenant governors of California
