= Tom McClintock =

American politician (born 1956)

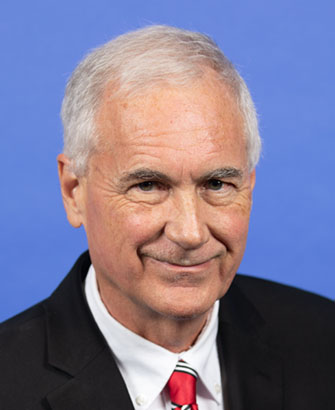
- Official portrait, 2022

Member of the U.S. House of Representatives from California
- Incumbent
- Assumed office January 3, 2009
- Preceded by: John Doolittle
- Constituency: 4th district (2009–2023); 5th district (2023–present)

Member of the California State Senate from the 19th district
- In office December 4, 2000 – December 1, 2008
- Preceded by: Cathie Wright
- Succeeded by: Tony Strickland

Member of the California State Assembly
- In office December 2, 1996 – December 4, 2000
- Preceded by: Paula Boland
- Succeeded by: Keith Richman
- Constituency: 38th district
- In office December 6, 1982 – December 7, 1992
- Preceded by: Chuck Imbrecht
- Succeeded by: William J. Knight
- Constituency: 36th district

Personal details
- Born: Thomas Miller McClintock II; July 10, 1956 (age 70) Westchester County, New York, U.S. (Note: Sources differ as to whether he was born in Bronxville or White Plains, New York.)
- Party: Republican
- Spouse: Lori McClintock (m. 1987; died 2021)
- Children: 2
- Education: University of California, Los Angeles (BA)
- Website: House website Campaign website
- McClintock's voice McClintock on respecting the electoral process and mail-in voting. Recorded November 17, 2020

Thomas Miller McClintock II (born July 10, 1956) is an American politician serving as the U.S. representative for California's 5th congressional district since 2009 (known as the 4th congressional district until 2023). His district stretches from the Sacramento suburbs to the outer suburbs of Fresno; it includes Yosemite National Park. A member of the Republican Party, McClintock served as a California state assemblyman from 1982 to 1992 and from 1996 to 2000, when he became a California state senator, a position he held until 2008. He unsuccessfully ran for governor of California in the 2003 recall election and for Lieutenant Governor of California in the 2006 election.

== Early life, education and early political career ==
McClintock was born on July 10, 1956, in Westchester County, New York. His family moved to Thousand Oaks, California, in 1965. He graduated in 1978 from the University of California, Los Angeles (UCLA) with a degree in political science. At 23, he was elected chair of the Ventura County Republican Party, and served until 1981. He was chief of staff to State Senator Ed Davis from 1980 to 1982. From 1992 to 1994, he served as director of the Center for the California Taxpayer. He was director of the Claremont Institute's Golden State Center for Policy Studies from 1995 to 1996.

== California politics ==
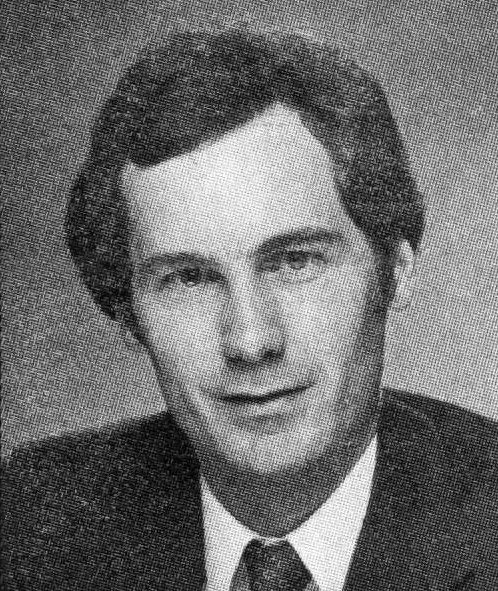
McClintock in 1988, during his first State Assembly tenure.

=== California Assembly (1982–1992, 1996–2000) ===
In 1982, at age 26, McClintock ran for California's 36th State Assembly district, then based in Thousand Oaks, after redistricting. He defeated Democrat Harriet Kosmo Henson 56%–44%. He was reelected in 1984, defeating Tom Jolicoeur 72%–28%. In 1986, he was reelected to a third term, defeating Frank Nekimken 73%–25%. In 1988, he was reelected to a fourth term, defeating George Webb II 70%–29%. In 1990, he was reelected to a fifth term, defeating Ginny Connell 59%–36%.

After running for Congress in 1992 and for controller in 1994, McClintock ran for the Assembly again in 1996. He ran for California's 38th State Assembly district and defeated Democrat Jon Lauritzen 56%–40% to win his sixth Assembly term. In 1998, McClintock was reelected to a seventh term unopposed.

McClintock authored California's lethal injection use for California's death penalty law. He also opposed tax increases and supported spending cuts. He was a strong proponent of abolishing the car tax.

=== California Senate (2000–2008) ===
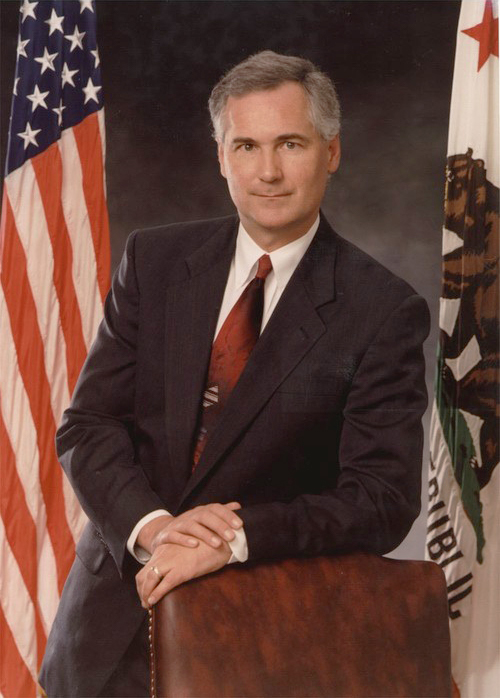
Tom McClintock as a California State Senator

In 2000, McClintock retired from the California Assembly to run for California's 19th State Senate district. He ranked first in the March 7 open primary with 52% of the vote. In November, he defeated Democrat Daniel Gonzalez, 58%–42%. He was reelected in 2004, defeating Paul Joseph Graber, 61%–39%.

In 2008, McClintock voted against Proposition 2, which prohibits confining calves, pigs and hens in small cages in which they cannot extend their limbs. "Farm animals are food, not friends", he said in response to backlash to his vote. He also cited concern about increased grocery bills. In 2000, he was instrumental in proposing a two-thirds reduction in the vehicle license fee, or car tax. In 2003, he opposed then-Governor Gray Davis's attempt to rescind a rollback of a vehicle license fee. McClintock has also opposed deficit reduction efforts that would have increased taxes. He supported the Bureaucracy Reduction and Closure Commission and performance-based budgeting.

=== Other elections ===
==== 1994 controller election ====
McClintock ran for California State Controller after incumbent Gray Davis retired. He won the Republican primary, defeating John Morris, 61%–39%. In the general election, he lost to Kathleen Connell, former Special Assistant to Los Angeles Mayor Tom Bradley and Director of the L.A. Housing Authority, 48%–46%, with three other candidates receiving the other 6% of the vote.

==== 2002 controller election ====
McClintock ran for controller again in 2002, facing Democratic nominee Steve Westly, an eBay executive. Westly outspent him 5-to-1. McClintock's campaigns focused on increasing accountability for the state budget. The ads featured the character Angus McClintock, a fictional cousin and fellow Scottish American extolling McClintock's thriftiness and accountability in low-budget 15-second ads. He lost by a margin of just 0.2%, or 16,811 votes, to Westly, who won with 45.3% of the vote. Three other candidates received 9.5% of the vote.

==== 2003 gubernatorial recall election ====
In 2003, McClintock ran in the recall election against Davis. Republican and film actor Arnold Schwarzenegger won the election with 49% of the vote. Democratic Lieutenant Governor Cruz Bustamante finished second with 31%. McClintock finished third with 14%. Together, Republicans Schwarzenegger and McClintock were supported by 5,363,778 Californians, or 62.1% of the vote. 132 other candidates received the remaining 6.4%.

McClintock performed the best in Stanislaus County, where he received 24% of the vote. He also cracked 20% or higher in several other counties: Mariposa (23%), Tuolumne (22%), Tehama (21%), Calaveras (20%), Madera (20%), Modoc (20%), Shasta (20%), San Joaquin (20%), and Ventura (20%).

==== 2006 lieutenant gubernatorial election ====
McClintock ran for lieutenant governor in 2006. He defeated Tony Farmer in the Republican primary, 94–6%. In the general election, he lost to Democratic State Insurance Commissioner John Garamendi, 49%–45%.

== U.S. House of Representatives ==
=== Elections ===
==== 1992 ====
After redistricting, McClintock retired from the Assembly to challenge Democratic U.S. Representative Anthony C. Beilenson in California's 24th congressional district. He won the nine-candidate Republican primary with a plurality of 34% of the vote, beating second-place finisher Sang Korman by 11 points. Beilenson defeated McClintock, 56–39%.

==== 2008 ====
On March 4, 2008, McClintock announced his candidacy for the U.S. House of Representatives in California's 4th congressional district, about 300 miles north of the district McClintock represented in the state Senate. The district's nine-term incumbent, John Doolittle, was retiring. McClintock was unable to vote for himself in either the primary or the general election. Although for most of the year he lived in Elk Grove, a suburb of Sacramento within the 3rd district at the time, his legal residence was in Thousand Oaks, within the borders of his state senate district. The California Constitution requires state senators to maintain their legal residence in the district they represent.

Upon McClintock's entry into the race, fellow Republicans Rico Oller and Eric Egland withdrew from the primary and endorsed him. He was also endorsed by the Republican Liberty Caucus, the Club for Growth, and U.S. Representative Ron Paul. McClintock faced former U.S. Representative Doug Ose, a moderate who represented the neighboring 3rd District from 1999 to 2005. Like McClintock, Ose lived outside the district and was painted as a carpetbagger and a liberal who had voted to raise taxes and who voted for earmarks. McClintock defeated Ose, 54–39%.

The Democratic nominee was retired Air Force Lt. Col. Charles D. (Charlie) Brown, who had run an unexpectedly strong race against Doolittle in 2006. In March 2008, Ose's campaign commercials criticized McClintock for receiving over $300,000 in per diem living expenses during his time in the state senate even though he lived in Elk Grove for most of the year. McClintock maintained that the payments were justified because his legal residence was in Thousand Oaks, in his district. He said, "Every legislator's [Sacramento area] residence is close to the Capitol. My residential costs up here are much greater than the average legislator because my family is here." Ose's campaign commercials argued McClintock did not own or rent a home in the 19th district, but claimed his mother's home in Thousand Oaks as his state senate district residence. These attacks prompted a response from McClintock's wife, Lori, who said McClintock stayed with his mother to care for her after she fell ill and after the death of her husband. McClintock ran ads attacking Brown's participation at a 2005 protest by Code Pink, a prominent antiwar group, and argued Brown supported gay marriage but not the troops in Iraq. He also portrayed Brown as a clone of Speaker Nancy Pelosi.

By November 23, McClintock led Brown by 1,566 votes (0.4% of the vote), 184,190 to 182,624. Subsequent returns expanded the margin slightly with the last returns coming in from El Dorado County shortly after Thanksgiving. On December 1, McClintock declared victory and Brown conceded on December 3. McClintock defeated Brown by a margin of 0.5%, or 1,800 votes. He prevailed by a 3,500-vote margin in Placer County, the district's largest county. Brown won three of the district's nine counties: Sierra (49.8%), Plumas (47.9%), and Nevada (42.3%). McClintock won mainly on the coattails from John McCain, who carried the 4th with 54% of the vote, his fifth-best total in the state.

==== 2010 ====
McClintock defeated Michael Babich in the Republican primary, Babich 78–22%. On November 2, he was reelected, defeating businessman Clint Curtis 61–31% and winning every county in the district.

==== 2012 ====
For his first two terms, McClintock represented a district covering the northeast corner of California, from the eastern suburbs of Sacramento to the Oregon border.

Redistricting after the 2010 census pushed the 4th well to the south. Only three counties remained from the old 4th: Nevada, Placer, and El Dorado. The redrawn district cut out the 4th's share of Sacramento County, including the part of Elk Grove that includes McClintock's home. Elk Grove is now entirely within the borders of the neighboring 7th District, represented by Democrat Ami Bera, making McClintock one of only a few members of Congress who live outside the district they represent. House members are constitutionally required only to live in the state they represent, but longstanding convention holds that they live in or reasonably close to their districts. McClintock said in 2016 that he intended to move his residence inside the redrawn 4th as soon as home prices rebounded enough for him to sell his Elk Grove home.

In 2012, California instituted its "top two" primary, in which candidates of all parties run against one another and the top two finishers, regardless of party, advance to the general election. McClintock and Democrat Jack Uppal were the only candidates in the "top two" primary, so the general election was a rematch. The reconfigured 4th was as strongly Republican as its predecessor, and McClintock was reelected to a third term, defeating Uppal 61%–39% in the general election. McClintock won all but two of the district's ten counties: Alpine (41%) and Nevada (37%).

==== 2014 ====
McClintock was reelected, finishing first in California's "top two" primary and defeating moderate Republican challenger National Guard Major Art Moore in the general election, 60%–40%.

==== 2016 ====
McClintock again finished first in the primary and defeated Democrat Robert W. Derlet, a physician, environmentalist and retired UC Davis professor, in the general election, 63%–37%.

==== 2018 ====
McClintock defeated Democratic challenger Jessica Morse in the general election, receiving 184,401 votes to her 156,253 (54.1% to 45.9%).

=== Tenure ===
During the 112th Congress, McClintock was one of 40 members of the Republican Study Committee who frequently voted against Republican Party leadership and vocally expressed displeasure with House bills. In 2011, he voted against the National Defense Authorization Act for Fiscal Year 2012 due to a provision that would allow the government and the military to indefinitely detain American citizens and others without trial. McClintock's chief of staff, Igor Birman, was a candidate for Congress in California's 7th congressional district in 2014.

In 2009, McClintock signed a pledge sponsored by Americans for Prosperity promising to vote against any global warming legislation that would raise taxes.

McClintock voted in favor of the Tax Cuts and Jobs Act of 2017. He voted against the first version of the bill, displeased with the removal of deductions related to medical expenses, student loan interest, and casualty loss. Those three items were addressed in the final version of the bill. McClintock said the bill would "restore American workers to an internationally competitive position." He expressed concern about the bill's impact on the budget deficit and anticipated that it would be addressed "by spending reforms this coming year."

In 2017, McClintock called for special prosecutor Robert Mueller to investigate President Donald Trump. McClintock felt that Trump's firing of James Comey justified a special prosecutor.

After Trump pulled 1,000 U.S. troops from Kurdish-held territory on the Syrian border south of Turkey in 2019, a bipartisan resolution passed the House, 354–60, that condemned him for abandoning those U.S. allies that would allow the Islamic State of Iraq and the Levant (ISIL) to reestablish and regroup its forces, and allow the Turks to attack the Kurds. McClintock was one of the two members of California's congressional delegation to vote against it.

In 2020, McClintock was the sole House Republican to cosponsor the Ending Qualified Immunity Act, which was proposed in response to the murder of George Floyd and resultant widespread protests. The act was introduced by Justin Amash and Ayanna Pressley and cosponsored by 62 House Democrats in addition to McClintock. Because Amash was a registered Libertarian as of the act's introduction in June 2020, McClintock's support technically made the act the first tripartisan piece of federal legislation in modern U.S. history.

In the 118th Congress, McClintock voted against multiple motions to discipline certain Democrats in office, such as the first censure of Adam Schiff, the censure of Rashida Tlaib, and the impeachment of Alejandro Mayorkas. In each, he lambasted their actions but believed the motions were an erosion of the standards to which such motions should be held. Despite making a speech supporting holding Merrick Garland in contempt of Congress for the federal prosecution of Donald Trump, he would vote against holding him in contempt for refusing to release the audio files of the Hur interviews in the Joe Biden classified documents incident.

=== Legislation ===
McClintock supported the Water Rights Protection Act, a bill that would prevent federal agencies from requiring certain entities to relinquish their water rights to the United States to use public lands. The bill was a reaction to the United States Forest Service's decision to pursue a "new regulation to demand that water rights be transferred to the federal government as a condition for obtaining permits needed to operate 121 ski resorts that cross over federal lands." McClintock supported the bill, saying that the Forest Service's regulation "illustrates an increasingly hostile attitude by this agency toward those who make productive use of our vast national forests, in this case by enhancing and attracting the tourism upon which our mountain communities depend."

=== Committee assignments ===
For the 118th Congress:

- Committee on Natural Resources
  - Subcommittee on Federal Lands
  - Subcommittee on Water, Wildlife and Fisheries
- Committee on the Budget
- Committee on the Judiciary
  - Subcommittee on Immigration Integrity, Security, and Enforcement (Chair)
  - Subcommittee on the Constitution and Limited Government

=== Caucus memberships ===
- Congressional Arts Caucus
- Republican Study Committee
- Tea Party Caucus
- American Sikh Congressional Caucus
- Congressional Constitution Caucus
- Congressional Western Caucus
- United States Congressional International Conservation Caucus
- House Freedom Caucus (Formerly)

== Political positions ==
=== 2020 presidential election ===
In December 2020, McClintock joined 125 other Republican members of Congress in signing an amicus brief in support of a lawsuit by the attorney general of the state of Texas that sought to overturn the certified results of the 2020 presidential election in four other U.S. states. The lawsuit was called a "seditious abuse of the judicial process" by the attorney general of Pennsylvania, and "simply madness" by 2012 Republican presidential nominee Mitt Romney.

House Speaker Nancy Pelosi issued a statement that called signing the amicus brief an act of "election subversion."

McClintock later became one of seven Republicans who did not support their colleagues' efforts to challenge the results of the election on January 6, 2021. These seven signed a letter that, while giving credence to election fraud allegations Trump made, said Congress did not have the authority to influence the election's outcome.

McClintock voted against impeaching Trump over his role in inciting the 2021 storming of the U.S. Capitol.

=== Animal rights ===
McClintock has said that "farm animals are food, not friends."

=== Cannabis ===
In 2015, McClintock introduced an amendment to limit the enforcement of federal law in states that have legalized cannabis. Known as the McClintock–Polis Amendment, it failed by a 206–222 vote. It was reintroduced in 2019 as the Blumenauer–McClintock–Norton amendment and passed 267–165.

In 2016, McClintock endorsed California's Proposition 64, the Adult Use of Marijuana Act. He stated: "Our current laws have failed us, and have created a violent and criminal black market that actively and aggressively markets to young people. Legalization takes the criminal profit out of the equation, and allows us to regulate marijuana the same way we currently regulate alcohol."

In 2020, McClintock was one of five House Republicans to vote for the Marijuana Opportunity Reinvestment and Expungement (MORE) Act to legalize cannabis at the federal level. In 2021, he was one of four original cosponsors of a Republican-led legalization bill named the States Reform Act.

=== COVID-19 ===
During the COVID-19 pandemic, McClintock expressed the view that wearing face masks should not be mandatory, and while wearing a mask during congressional sessions, said, "this mask is useless". During the second impeachment of Donald Trump, McClintock wore a mask that read "This mask is as useless as our governor", referring to Governor Gavin Newsom.

=== Environment ===
McClintock questions the role that human activity plays in climate change, arguing that the "climate has been changing for four and a half billion years."

=== Fiscal restraint ===
In 2025, McClintock introduced a bill to provide a Line-Item Veto by amending the US Constitution. The proposal would grant the President the authority to eliminate or reduce specific appropriations funding authorization bills.

=== Foreign policy ===
In 2019, McClintock was one of 60 representatives to vote against condemning Trump's withdrawal from Syria.

In 2020, McClintock voted against the National Defense Authorization Act of 2021, which would prevent the president from withdrawing soldiers from Afghanistan without congressional approval.

In June 2021, McClintock was one of 49 House Republicans to vote to repeal the AUMF against Iraq.

In July 2021, McClintock was one of five House Republicans to vote against a bill that allocates $2.1 billion for Afghan visas and Capitol Hill security.

In 2023, McClintock was among 47 Republicans to vote in favor of H.Con.Res. 21, which directed President Joe Biden to remove U.S. troops from Syria within 180 days.

=== Human and civil rights ===
McClintock opposes same-sex marriage. In 2008, he said, "calling a homosexual partnership a marriage doesn't make it one."

In June 2021, McClintock was one of 14 House Republicans to vote against legislation to establish June 19, or Juneteenth, as a federal holiday.

=== Immigration ===
McClintock voted against the Fairness for High-Skilled Immigrants Act of 2019 which would amend the Immigration and Nationality Act to eliminate the per-country numerical limitation for employment-based immigrants, to increase the per-country numerical limitation for family-sponsored immigrants, and for other purposes.

McClintock voted against the Further Consolidated Appropriations Act of 2020 which authorizes DHS to nearly double the available H-2B visas for the remainder of FY 2020.

McClintock voted against Consolidated Appropriations Act (H.R. 1158) which effectively prohibits ICE from cooperating with Health and Human Services to detain or remove illegal alien sponsors of unaccompanied alien children (UACs).

=== Voting rights ===
McClintock opposes mail-in voting, saying in 2020 that it was a "corrupted process" that allows ballots to be sent to voters who have died or moved away.

== Personal life ==
McClintock was married to Lori McClintock until her death in December 2021, from dehydration due to gastroenteritis caused, according to a coroner's report, by "adverse effects of white mulberry leaf ingestion". McClintock is a Baptist. As of 2024, he lives in Elk Grove, California.

== Electoral history ==
Electoral history of Tom McClintock
Year	Office		Party	Primary			General			Result	Swing	Ref.
Year	Office		Party	Total	%	P.	Total	%	P.	Result	Swing	Ref.
1982	California State Assembly	36th	Republican				60,702	55.9	1st	Won	Hold	
1984	California State Assembly	36th	Republican				94,391	71.5	1st	Won	Hold	
1986	California State Assembly	36th	Republican				77,132	73.3	1st	Won	Hold	
1988	California State Assembly	36th	Republican				101,012	70.0	1st	Won	Hold	
1990	California State Assembly	36th	Republican	28,740	80.7	1st	66,081	58.6	1st	Won	Hold	
1992	U.S. House	24th	Republican	20,163	34.5	1st	99,835	39.1	2nd	Lost	Hold	
1994	California State Controller		Republican	1,112,435	60.8	1st	3,792,997	46.1	2nd	Lost	Hold	
1996	State Assembly	38th	Republican	13,999	38.2	1st	71,596	55.5	1st	Won	Hold	
1998	State Assembly	38th	Republican	52,345	99.73	1st	78,417	100	1st	Won	Hold	
2000	State Senate	19th	Republican	99,135	52.5	1st	165,422	57.6	1st	Won	Hold	
2002	State Controller		Republican	948,539	45.8	1st	3,273,028	45.1	2nd	Lost	Hold	
2003	Governor		Republican				1,161,287	13.5	3rd	Lost	Gain	
2004	State Senate	19th	Republican	99,301	100	1st	233,365	60.8	1st	Won	Hold	
2006	Lieutenant Governor		Republican	1,760,667	93.8	1st	3,845,858	45.1	2nd	Lost	Hold	
2008	U.S. House	4th	Republican	51,655	53.5	1st	185,790	49.7	1st	Won	Hold	
2010	U.S. House	4th	Republican	89,443	78.5	1st	186,392	61.3	1st	Won	Hold	
2012	U.S. House	4th	Republican	114,311	64.8	1st	197,803	61.1	1st	Won	Hold	
2014	U.S. House	4th	Republican	80,999	56.2	1st	126,784	60.0	1st	Won	Hold	
2016	U.S. House	4th	Republican	135,626	61.5	1st	220,133	62.7	1st	Won	Hold	
2018	U.S. House	4th	Republican	109,679	51.8	1st	184,401	54.1	1st	Won	Hold	
2020	U.S. House	4th	Republican	141,244	50.7	1st	247,291	55.9	1st	Won	Hold	
2022	U.S. House	5th	Republican	87,010	45.5	1st	172,834	61.3	1st	Won	Hold	
2024	U.S. House	5th	Republican	118,958	58.5	1st	227,643	61.8	1st	Won	Hold	
2026	U.S. House	5th	Republican	129,653	61.29	1st	TBD					
Source: Secretary of State of California | Statewide Election Results

== Notes ==
Party political offices
Preceded by Matt Fong	Republican nominee for Controller of California; 1994	Succeeded by Ruben Barrales
Preceded by Ruben Barrales	Republican nominee for Controller of California; 2002	Succeeded by Tony Strickland
Preceded by Bruce McPherson	Republican nominee for Lieutenant Governor of California; 2006	Succeeded by Abel Maldonado
U.S. House of Representatives
Preceded by John Doolittle	Member of the U.S. House of Representatives from California's 4th congressional district 2009–2023	Succeeded by Mike Thompson
Preceded by Mike Thompson	Member of the U.S. House of Representatives from California's 5th congressional district 2023–present	Incumbent
U.S. order of precedence (ceremonial)
Preceded by Jim Himes	United States representatives by seniority 68th	Succeeded by Chellie Pingree
