= 2006 California elections =

- November 7, 2006
- Registered: 15,837,108
- Turnout: 56.19% (▼19.85 pp)

Elections were held in California on November 7, 2006. Primary elections were held on June 6. Among the elections that took place were all the seats of the California's State Assembly, 20 seats of the State Senate, seven constitutional officers, and all the seats of the Board of Equalization. Votes on retention of two Supreme Court justices and various Courts of Appeal judges were also held. Five propositions were also up for approval.

== United States Senate ==
United States Senate election in California, 2006
Party	Candidate	Votes	%
Democratic	Dianne Feinstein (incumbent)	5,076,289	59.43
Republican	Dick Mountjoy	2,990,822	35.02
Green	Todd Chretien	147,074	1.72
Libertarian	Michael Metti	133,851	1.57
Peace and Freedom	Marsha Feinland	117,764	1.38
American Independent	Don Grundmann	75,350	0.88
Green	Kent Mesplay (write-in)	160	0.00
Independent	Jeffrey Mackler (write-in)	108	0.00
Independent	Lea Sherman (write-in)	47	0.00
Independent	Connor Vlakancic (write-in)	11	0.00
Invalid or blank votes		357,583	4.19
Total votes		8,899,059	100.00
Turnout			53.93
Democratic hold			

== United States House of Representatives ==
United States House of Representatives elections in California, 2006
Party	Votes	Percentage	Seats	+/–
Democratic	4,720,714	53.05%	34	+1
Republican	3,329,485	37.41%	19	–1
Libertarian	170,711	1.92%	0	0
Green	48,445	0.54%	0	0
Peace and Freedom	27,467	0.31%	0	0
American Independent	11,694	0.13%	0	0
Independent	2,755	0.03%	0	0
Invalid or blank votes	603,243	6.78%	—	—
Totals	8,899,059	100.00%	53	—

== Constitutional officers ==
=== Governor ===
California gubernatorial election, 2006
Party	Candidate	Votes	%
Republican	Arnold Schwarzenegger (incumbent)	4,850,157	55.9
Democratic	Phil Angelides	3,376,732	39.0
Green	Peter Camejo	205,995	2.31
Libertarian	Art Olivier	114,329	1.28
Peace and Freedom	Janice Jordan	69,934	0.79
American Independent	Edward Noonan	61,901	0.70
Republican	Robert Newman (write-in)	219	0.00
Independent	James Harris (write-in)	46	0.00
Independent	Donald Etkes (write-in)	43	0.00
Independent	Elisha Shapiro (write-in)	43	0.00
Independent	Vibert Greene (write-in)	18	0.00
Independent	Dealphria Tarver (write-in)	6	0.00
Invalid or blank votes		219,643	2.47
Total votes		8,899,059	100.00
Turnout			32.77
Republican hold			

=== Lieutenant governor ===
California lieutenant governor election, 2006
Party	Candidate	Votes	%
Democratic	John Garamendi	4,189,584	47.08
Republican	Tom McClintock	3,845,858	43.22
Green	Donna Warren	239,107	2.69
Libertarian	Lynnette Shaw	142,851	1.61
American Independent	Jim King	68,446	0.77
Peace and Freedom	Stewart Alexander	43,319	0.49
Invalid or blank votes		369,894	4.16
Total votes		8,899,059	100.00
Turnout			32.77
Democratic hold			

=== Secretary of State ===
California Secretary of State election, 2006
Party	Candidate	Votes	%
Democratic	Debra Bowen	4,032,553	45.31
Republican	Bruce McPherson (incumbent)	3,772,951	42.40
Green	Forrest Hill	181,369	2.04
Libertarian	Gail Lightfoot	171,393	1.93
American Independent	Glenn McMillon	135,824	1.53
Peace and Freedom	Margie Akin	91,483	1.03
Invalid or blank votes		513,486	5.77
Total votes		8,899,059	100.00
Turnout			53.93
Democratic gain from Republican			

=== State Controller ===
California State Controller election, 2006
Party	Candidate	Votes	%
Democratic	John Chiang	4,232,313	47.56
Republican	Tony Strickland	3,360,611	37.76
Green	Laura Wells	260,047	2.92
Peace and Freedom	Elizabeth Cervantes Barron	212,383	2.39
Libertarian	Donna Tello	188,934	2.12
American Independent	Warren Campbell	106,761	1.12
Invalid or blank votes		538,010	6.05
Total votes		8,899,059	100.00
Turnout			53.93
Democratic hold			

=== State Treasurer ===
California State Treasurer election, 2006
Party	Candidate	Votes	%
Democratic	Bill Lockyer	4,523,854	50.84
Republican	Claude Parrish	3,095,615	34.79
Libertarian	Marian Smithson	334,056	3.75
Green	Mehul Thakker	201,670	2.27
American Independent	E. Justin Noonan	93,281	1.05
Peace and Freedom	Jack Harrison	71,726	0.81
Invalid or blank votes		578,857	6.50
Total votes		8,899,059	100.00
Turnout			53.93
Democratic hold			

=== Attorney general ===
California Attorney General election, 2006
Party	Candidate	Votes	%
Democratic	Jerry Brown	4,756,184	53.45
Republican	Chuck Poochigian	3,220,429	36.19
Green	Michael Wyman	195,130	2.19
Libertarian	Kenneth Weissman	177,469	1.99
Peace and Freedom	Jack Harrison	100,797	1.13
Invalid or blank votes		449,050	5.05
Total votes		8,899,059	100.00
Turnout			53.93
Democratic hold			

=== Insurance Commissioner ===
California Insurance Commissioner election, 2006
Party	Candidate	Votes	%
Republican	Steve Poizner	4,229,986	47.53
Democratic	Cruz Bustamante	3,204,536	36.01
Libertarian	Dale Ogden	305,772	3.44
Green	Larry Cafiero	270,218	3.04
Peace and Freedom	Tom Condit	187,618	2.11
American Independent	Jay Burden	127,267	1.43
Invalid or blank votes		573,662	6.45
Total votes		8,899,059	100.00
Turnout			53.93
Republican gain from Democratic			

== Board of Equalization ==
=== Overview ===
2006 California Board of Equalization elections
Party	Votes	Percentage	Seats	+/–
Democratic	4,101,849	51.33%	2	0
Republican	3,414,117	42.72%	2	0
Peace and Freedom	276,610	3.46%	0	0
Libertarian	199,306	2.49%	0	0
Invalid or blank votes	907,177	10.19%	—	—
Totals	8,899,059	100.00%	4	—

=== District 1 ===
2006 State Board of Equalization District 1 election
Party	Candidate	Votes	%
Democratic	Betty T. Yee	1,508,130	64.94
Republican	David Neighbors	677,942	29.19
Libertarian	Kennita Watson	68,405	2.95
Peace and Freedom	David Campbell	67,697	2.92
Total votes		2,322,174	100.00
Turnout			
Democratic hold			

=== District 2 ===
2006 State Board of Equalization District 2 election
Party	Candidate	Votes	%
Republican	Bill Leonard (incumbent)	1,155,308	55.75
Democratic	Tim Raboy	783,829	37.82
Peace and Freedom	Richard Perry	75,419	3.64
Libertarian	Willard Del Michlin	57,823	2.79
Total votes		2,072,379	100.00
Turnout			
Republican hold			

=== District 3 ===
2006 State Board of Equalization District 3 election
Party	Candidate	Votes	%
Republican	Michelle Steel	1,147,514	56.99
Democratic	Mary Christian-Heising	774,499	38.47
Peace and Freedom	Mary Finley	91,467	4.54
Total votes		2,013,480	100.00
Turnout			
Republican hold			

=== District 4 ===
2006 State Board of Equalization District 4 election
Party	Candidate	Votes	%
Democratic	Judy Chu	1,035,391	65.37
Republican	Glen Forsch	433,353	27.36
Libertarian	Monica Kadera	73,078	4.61
Peace and Freedom	Cindy Henderson	42,027	2.65
Total votes		1,583,849	100.00
Turnout			
Democratic hold			

== Judicial system ==
Voters are asked to vote on the retention of judicial seats within the Supreme Court of California and the California Courts of Appeal. Both of the two associate justices of the Supreme Court and all 55 judges of the Courts of Appeal retained their seats.

=== Supreme Court ===
Supreme Court Associate Justice seat 1, Joyce Kennard
Vote on retention	Votes	Percentage
Yes	4,395,470	49.39%
No	1,501,183	16.87%
Invalid or blank votes	3,002,406	33.74%
Totals	8,899,059	100.00%
Voter turnout	53.93%	

Supreme Court Seat 1 Retention results map by county Yes: 80–90%; 70–80%; 60–70%; 50–60%

Supreme Court Associate Justice seat 2, Carol Corrigan
Vote on retention	Votes	Percentage
Yes	4,304,376	48.37%
No	1,483,509	16.67%
Invalid or blank votes	3,111,174	34.96%
Totals	8,899,059	100.00%
Voter turnout	53.93%	

Supreme Court Seat 2 Retention results map by county Yes: 80–90%; 70–80%; 60–70%; 50–60%

== State Senate ==
There are 40 seats in the State Senate, the upper house of California's bicameral State Legislature. For this election, candidates running for even-numbered districts ran for four-year terms. The California Democratic Party maintained its majority control.

2006 California State Senate elections
Party	Votes	Percentage	Seats	+/–
Democratic	1,903,307	54.19%	25	0
Republican	1,450,607	41.30%	15	0
Libertarian	138,669	3.95%	0	0
Green	13,443	0.38%	0	0
Peace and Freedom	5,573	0.16%	0	0
Independent	911	0.03%	0	0
Totals	3,512,510	100.00%	20	—

== State Assembly ==
All 80 biennially-elected seats of the State Assembly, the lower house of California's bicameral State Legislature, were up for election this year. The California Democratic Party retained control of the State Assembly.

2006 California State Assembly elections
Party	Votes	Percentage	Seats	+/–
Democratic	4,406,601	49.52%	48	0
Republican	3,524,702	39.61%	32	+1
Libertarian	122,036	1.37%	0	0
Peace and Freedom	29,726	0.33%	0	0
Green	22,472	0.25%	0	0
Independent	51	0.00%	0	0
Vacant^{[A]}	—	—	0	–1
Invalid or blank votes	793,471	8.92%	—	—
Totals	8,899,059	100.00%	80	—

^{A} The 67th State Assembly district was left vacant after Republican Tom Harman won a special election to fill the 35th State Senate district on June 12, 2006. There was not enough time to schedule a special election for the Assembly seat, but Republican Jim Silva succeeded him after winning this election.

== Statewide ballot propositions ==
Thirteen propositions, including five bond measures, qualified to be listed on the general election ballot in California. All five bond measures passed, but only two non-bonds, 83 and the bond-like 84, won approval.

=== Proposition 1A ===
1A would amend the California constitution to limit the conditions under which the transfer of gasoline sales tax revenues from transportation costs to other uses may be allowed. Suspensions would be treated as loans to the General Fund which must be repaid in full, including interest, and suspensions would not be allowed more than twice every ten years. Additionally, all prior suspensions would need to be paid off before another suspension could be put into effect. Proposition 1A passed with 76.6% approval.

Proposition 1A results by county Yes: 80–90%; 70–80%; 60–70%

=== Proposition 1B ===
1B authorizes the state to sell $20 billion in bonds to fund transportation projects related to congestion, the movement of goods, air quality and transportation security. Proposition 1B passed with 61.3% approval.

Proposition 1B results by county Yes: 60–70%; 50–60%; No: 60–70%; 50–60%

=== Proposition 1C ===
1C authorizes the state to sell $2.85 billion in bonds to fund new and existing housing and development programs. Proposition 1C passed with 57.5% approval.

Proposition 1C results by county Yes: 70–80%; 60–70%; 50–60%; No: 50–60%

=== Proposition 1D ===
1D allows the state to sell $10.4 billion in bonds to fund construction and building modernization for K-12 schools and institutions of higher education. Proposition 1D passed with 56.6% approval.

Proposition 1D results by county Yes: 70–80%; 60–70%; 50–60%; No: 60–70%; 50–60%

=== Proposition 1E ===
1E authorizes the state to sell $4.1 billion in bonds for flood management programs. Proposition 1E passed with 64.0% approval.

Proposition 1E results by county Yes: 70–80%; 60–70%; 50–60%; No: 50–60%

=== Proposition 83 ===
Increases the severity of punishments for sex crimes in several ways. It broadens the definition of certain sex offenses, lengthens penalties, prohibits probation for some crimes, eliminates early release credits for some offenses, extends parole for some specific sex offenses, and increases court-imposed fees on sex offenders. 83 is a lengthy and complex proposition, a complete summary of which can be found here. Proposition 83 passed with 70.5% approval.

It effectively blocks offenders from living in the vast majority of the areas of large California cities.

Within 24 hours of its passage, its enforcement was blocked by U.S. District Judge Susan Illston, who ruled in a lawsuit filed by an existing offender based on its retroactive nature.

=== Proposition 84 ===
Allows the state to sell $5.4 billion in bonds to fund programs for safe water supply and quality, flood control, park improvements and natural resource protection. Proposition 84 passed with 53.8% approval.

Proposition 84 results by county Yes: 70–80%; 60–70%; 50–60%; No: 70–80%; 60–70%; 50–60%

=== Proposition 85 ===
Amends the state constitution to require, except in certain circumstances, doctors to inform the parent or legal guardians of an unemancipated minor at least 48 hours before an abortion is performed on that minor; a process by which the minor can obtain a legal waiver of the notification requirement is also included in the text. Proposition 85 failed to pass with 45.9% approval.

=== Proposition 86 ===
Amends the state constitution to increase the excise tax on tobacco cigarettes by $2.60 per pack, in order to fund healthcare expansion. Proposition 86 failed to pass, with 48.0% approval.

Proposition 86 results by county No: 70–80%; 60–70%; 50–60%; Yes: 60–70%; 50–60%

=== Proposition 87 ===
Imposes a tax of 1.5% to 6% on oil extracted from California (excluding offshore drilling on federally managed land) with the goal of decreasing petroleum consumption in California by 25%. The $4 billion raised by this tax would go towards research into alternative energy sources, as well as incentives for businesses and vehicle owners utilizing alternative energy and energy efficient technology. Proposition 87 failed to pass with 45.3% approval.

=== Proposition 88 ===
Amends the state constitution to allow for a $50 "parcel tax" on the ownership of plots of land (with exclusions for certain elderly or disabled landowners) to provide additional public school funding. Proposition 88 failed to pass with 23.1% approval.

Proposition 88 results by county No: 80–90%; 70–80%; 60–70%

=== Proposition 89 ===
Raises income tax on corporations and financial institutions by .2% in order to fund expanded public campaign funding for eligible state office candidates, and imposes new limits on contributions to campaigns. Proposition 89 failed to pass with 25.5% approval.

=== Proposition 90 ===
Limits the ability of state or local governments to seize private land for public use, and significantly increases the compensation the government must provide to landowners if new laws result in a change in value to their property. This proposition is part of a national response to the Supreme Court case Kelo v. City of New London, in which the Court asserted the right of governments to seize land for private development if it benefits the public at large. Proposition 90 failed to pass with 47.5% approval.

== See also ==
- California State Legislature
- California State Assembly
- 2006 California State Assembly election
- California State Senate
- 2006 California State Senate election
- Political party strength in U.S. states
- Political party strength in California
- Elections in California
- Districts in California
