= 1994 California State Controller election =

- November 8, 1994
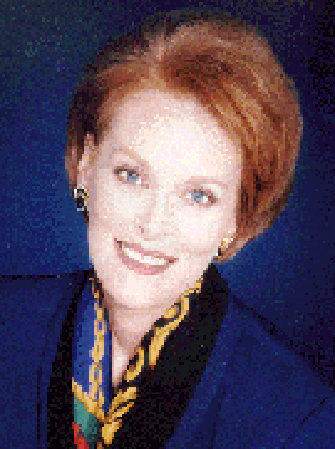

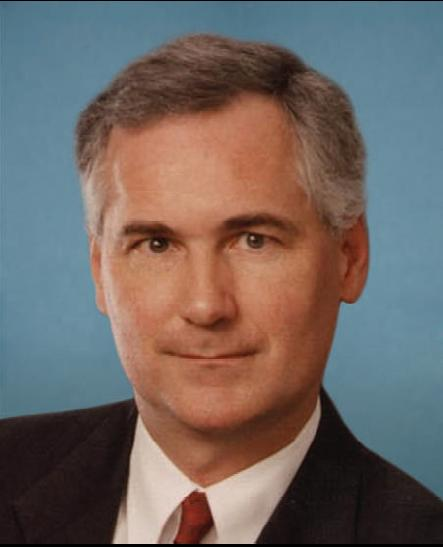
Nominee	Kathleen Connell	Tom McClintock
Party	Democratic	Republican
Popular vote	3,983,053	3,796,387
Percentage	48.32%	46.06%
- County results Connell: 40–50% 50–60% 60–70% 70–80% McClintock: 40–50% 50–60% 60–70%
Controller before election
Gray Davis
Democratic
Elected Controller
Kathleen Connell
Democratic

The 1994 California State Controller election occurred on November 3, 1994. The primary elections took place on March 8, 1994. The Democratic nominee, Kathleen Connell, narrowly defeated the Republican nominee, ex-State Assemblyman Tom McClintock.

== Primary results ==
Final results from California Secretary of State.

=== Democratic ===
California State Controller Democratic primary, 1994
Candidate	Votes	%
Kathleen Connell	1,016,904	48.50
Don Perata	571,848	27.27
Rusty Areias	508,120	24.23
Total votes	2,096,862	100.00

=== Republican ===
California State Controller Republican primary, 1994
Candidate	Votes	%
Tom McClintock	1,112,435	60.78
John Morris	717,681	39.22
Total votes	1,830,116	100.00

=== Peace & Freedom ===
California State Controller Peace & Freedom primary, 1994
Candidate	Votes	%
Elizabeth Nakano	2,910	62.93
Richard D. Rose	1,714	37.07
Total votes	4,624	100.00

=== Others ===
California State Controller primary, 1994 (Others)
Party	Candidate	Votes	%
American Independent	Nathan E. Johnson	17,325	100.00
Libertarian	Cullene Marie Lang	13,479	100.00

== Results ==
Final results from the Secretary of State of California.

1994 State Controller election, California
Party	Candidate	Votes	%
Democratic	Kathleen Connell	3,983,053	48.32
Republican	Tom McClintock	3,796,387	46.06
Peace and Freedom	Elizabeth Nakano	182,836	2.22
American Independent	Nathan E. Johnson	152,356	1.85
Libertarian	Cullene Marie Lang	128,378	1.56
Invalid or blank votes		657,626	7.39
Total votes		8,243,010	100.00
Turnout			46.98
Democratic hold			

=== Results by county ===
Final results from the Secretary of State of California.

County	Connell	Votes	McClintock	Votes	Nakano	Votes	Others	Votes
San Francisco	71.84%	155,444	19.93%	43,120	4.53%	9,797	3.70%	8,019
Alameda	65.62%	250,477	28.39%	108,368	3.04%	11,614	2.95%	11,263
Marin	60.20%	60,568	35.19%	35,407	2.10%	2,117	2.51%	2,524
San Mateo	58.83%	120,126	36.36%	74,238	1.98%	4,052	2.83%	5,767
Sonoma	56.33%	85,607	37.66%	57,234	2.65%	4,034	3.35%	5,092
Los Angeles	55.10%	1,087,398	39.23%	774,136	2.54%	50,141	3.13%	61,704
Yolo	54.97%	25,906	39.08%	18,420	2.82%	1,328	3.13%	1,476
Santa Cruz	53.34%	46,004	37.41%	32,262	4.77%	4,117	4.48%	3,861
Solano	53.22%	51,097	41.42%	39,767	2.05%	1,972	3.31%	3,180
Contra Costa	52.27%	145,489	42.96%	119,559	1.76%	4,911	3.00%	8,368
Santa Clara	52.01%	219,535	41.35%	174,542	2.60%	10,969	4.03%	17,027
Mendocino	51.47%	14,918	39.22%	11,368	4.67%	1,353	4.65%	1,346
Lake	50.79%	9,695	44.09%	8,415	1.40%	267	3.73%	711
Napa	50.25%	20,642	44.49%	18,274	1.63%	669	3.63%	1,491
Sacramento	49.10%	169,591	45.87%	158,448	1.87%	6,466	3.16%	10,903
Imperial	46.82%	10,750	46.72%	10,727	2.69%	618	3.77%	866
Humboldt	45.76%	21,077	46.52%	21,423	3.72%	1,714	4.00%	1,842
Monterey	45.26%	39,826	48.54%	42,704	2.52%	2,218	3.68%	3,237
Santa Barbara	45.06%	56,753	49.81%	62,737	2.04%	2,572	3.08%	3,882
Stanislaus	44.74%	43,137	50.61%	48,791	1.25%	1,203	3.40%	3,276
San Joaquin	44.22%	54,149	51.15%	62,634	1.74%	2,135	2.89%	3,545
San Benito	43.79%	4,913	49.42%	5,545	2.72%	305	4.07%	457
Tuolumne	43.49%	8,400	52.08%	10,059	1.19%	230	3.24%	626
Merced	43.11%	16,440	52.63%	20,068	1.57%	599	2.69%	1,026
Amador	43.09%	5,526	52.01%	6,669	1.12%	144	3.77%	484
San Bernardino	42.95%	145,276	51.60%	174,524	1.60%	5,421	3.84%	13,008
San Luis Obispo	41.78%	34,647	52.63%	43,643	2.11%	1,746	3.49%	2,894
Alpine	41.46%	262	47.63%	301	5.06%	32	5.85%	37
Kings	41.21%	8,979	54.22%	11,814	1.54%	335	3.03%	660
Riverside	41.20%	135,902	53.66%	176,988	1.66%	5,483	3.48%	11,480
Del Norte	41.15%	2,977	52.57%	3,803	1.56%	113	4.71%	341
Fresno	40.83%	70,005	54.05%	92,656	1.99%	3,411	3.13%	5,362
Plumas	40.45%	3,309	53.39%	4,367	1.74%	142	4.43%	362
Ventura	40.12%	84,198	55.16%	115,755	1.64%	3,444	3.07%	6,453
Calaveras	39.79%	6,088	53.86%	8,242	1.52%	233	4.83%	739
San Diego	39.31%	280,589	54.90%	391,875	1.97%	14,074	3.82%	27,270
Siskiyou	38.82%	6,805	53.96%	9,459	1.96%	343	5.27%	923
Mariposa	38.75%	2,695	55.77%	3,878	1.18%	82	4.30%	299
Sierra	38.15%	591	53.71%	832	1.68%	26	6.45%	100
Nevada	37.75%	13,895	56.50%	20,798	1.80%	663	3.95%	1,455
Lassen	37.49%	2,970	54.86%	4,346	1.72%	136	5.93%	470
Yuba	37.37%	5,149	56.10%	7,730	1.89%	260	4.64%	640
Mono	37.34%	1,236	56.31%	1,864	1.93%	64	4.41%	146
El Dorado	37.24%	19,660	57.44%	30,322	1.22%	642	4.10%	2,166
Placer	37.20%	26,874	57.64%	41,644	1.41%	1,018	3.75%	2,710
Inyo	36.96%	2,579	57.75%	4,030	1.40%	98	3.88%	271
Butte	36.39%	24,038	57.96%	38,288	1.83%	1,208	3.83%	2,531
Trinity	36.08%	1,906	53.98%	2,852	2.35%	124	7.59%	401
Orange	35.98%	259,505	58.96%	425,334	1.78%	12,828	3.28%	23,666
Madera	35.12%	9,110	60.72%	15,749	1.19%	308	2.97%	770
Tulare	34.74%	25,963	60.04%	44,872	1.83%	1,366	3.40%	2,540
Colusa	34.73%	1,669	60.81%	2,922	1.19%	57	3.27%	157
Kern	34.18%	49,726	60.02%	87,326	1.58%	2,303	4.22%	6,142
Tehama	33.82%	6,125	59.37%	10,751	1.16%	210	5.65%	1,022
Sutter	32.01%	6,896	63.66%	13,713	1.54%	332	2.79%	601
Shasta	31.17%	16,585	62.87%	33,454	1.20%	640	4.77%	2,536
Modoc	31.02%	1,163	59.46%	2,229	1.73%	65	7.79%	292
Glenn	28.65%	2,213	66.16%	5,111	1.09%	84	4.11%	317

== See also ==
- California state elections, 1994
- State of California
- Secretary of State of California
