= Ruben Barrales =

American politician (born 1962)

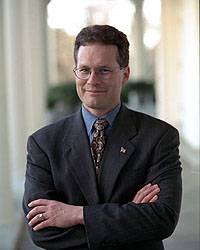

Director of the White House Office of Intergovernmental Affairs
- In office January 20, 2001 – December 28, 2006
- President: George W. Bush
- Preceded by: Mickey Ibarra
- Succeeded by: Maggie Grant

Personal details
- Born: April 14, 1962 (age 64)
- Party: Democratic (before 1992); Republican (1992–present)
- Education: University of California, Riverside (BA)

Ruben Barrales (born April 14, 1962) is the former Deputy Assistant to President George W. Bush, and was also the Director of the Office of Intergovernmental Affairs. He then was the CEO of the San Diego Regional Chamber of Commerce. He is currently the president and CEO of GROW Elect, a political action committee that recruits, endorses, trains, and funds Latino Republican candidates for public office. He is on the board of directors for the Public Policy Institute of California. Barrales has also run as a candidate for the state government post of California State Controller.

Barrales identifies as a Mexican American and is recognized as the first Latino person on the San Mateo County Board of Supervisors. Barrales has also appeared in the Hispanic Business Magazine's "100 Most Influential Hispanics" list on three occasions within the last ten years

== Early life and education ==
Ruben Barrales was born on April 14, 1962. He is the son of Mexican immigrants from Mexico City, and was raised in Redwood City, California. His father owned a roofing company. His father was paralyzed from a fall from a roof during a roofing job during Ruben's youth.

He attended Nativity Catholic School in Menlo Park, California and graduated from Junípero Serra High School in San Mateo, California in 1980. He graduated from the University of California, Riverside with a BA in political science in administrative studies.

== Political career ==
Barrales was first registered as a Democrat before he ran for San Mateo County Supervisor. In 1992, he was elected San Mateo County Supervisor, and became the first elected Latino Supervisor in the county. He was re-elected in 1996.

As a county Supervisor, he helped lower crime in East Palo Alto by collaborating with Sheriff Don Horsley and other cities to form the Gang Suppression Task Force. This was needed in East Palo Alto, a city that the Federal Bureau of Investigation considered the homicide capital of the United States in 1992, after 42 killings took place that year. He also supported the citizens of Redwood City in bringing the Shot Spotter to Redwood City to reduce random gun fire. Redwood City was instrumental in the development of the Gunshot Location System, which was possible through funding by San Mateo County and the major portion by the City of Redwood City.

In 1998, Barrales was the Republican candidate for California State Controller, though he failed to unseat Kathleen Connell. He received 2,652,115 votes (33%) to Connell's 4,874,097 votes (61%). Although he lost, the run for California State Controller gained him national attention. In 2001, he was appointed as deputy assistant to the president and director of intergovernmental affairs in the White House by President George W. Bush.

== Private sector ==
After one and a half-terms on the county board of supervisors, he moved to the private sector, becoming president and CEO of Joint Venture: Silicon Valley Network in San Jose, California.

Following his stint in the White House, he became president and CEO of the San Diego Regional Chamber of Commerce in December 2006.

== Notation ==
- Barrales is listed among the 100 most influential Hispanics/Latinos in the United States.
- Barrales was a member of the Speaker's Commission on the California Initiative Process.
- Barrales was Advisor for the Stanford Institute for Economic Policy Research.
- Barrales was Vice-Chairman of the California Commission on Local Governance for the 21st Century.
- Barrales was a member of the California Speaker's Commission on State and Local Government Finance.
- Barrales was recently featured in San Diego Magazine for his contributions to the strength of the Latino community in San Diego.

== Personal life ==
He is married and has two kids, Ryan and Rachel.

== Community service ==
He was a founding member of Garfield Charter School, in the Redwood City Elementary School District. Garfield Charter School was one of the first charter schools in California. He was instrumental in getting Garfield's Charter and secured funding for the first years.

He also was Director of the Peninsula Conflict Resolution Center.

Political offices
Preceded by Mickey Ibarra	Director of the White House Office of Intergovernmental Affairs; 2001–2006	Succeeded by Maggie Grant
