= Steve Westly =

American businessman and politician

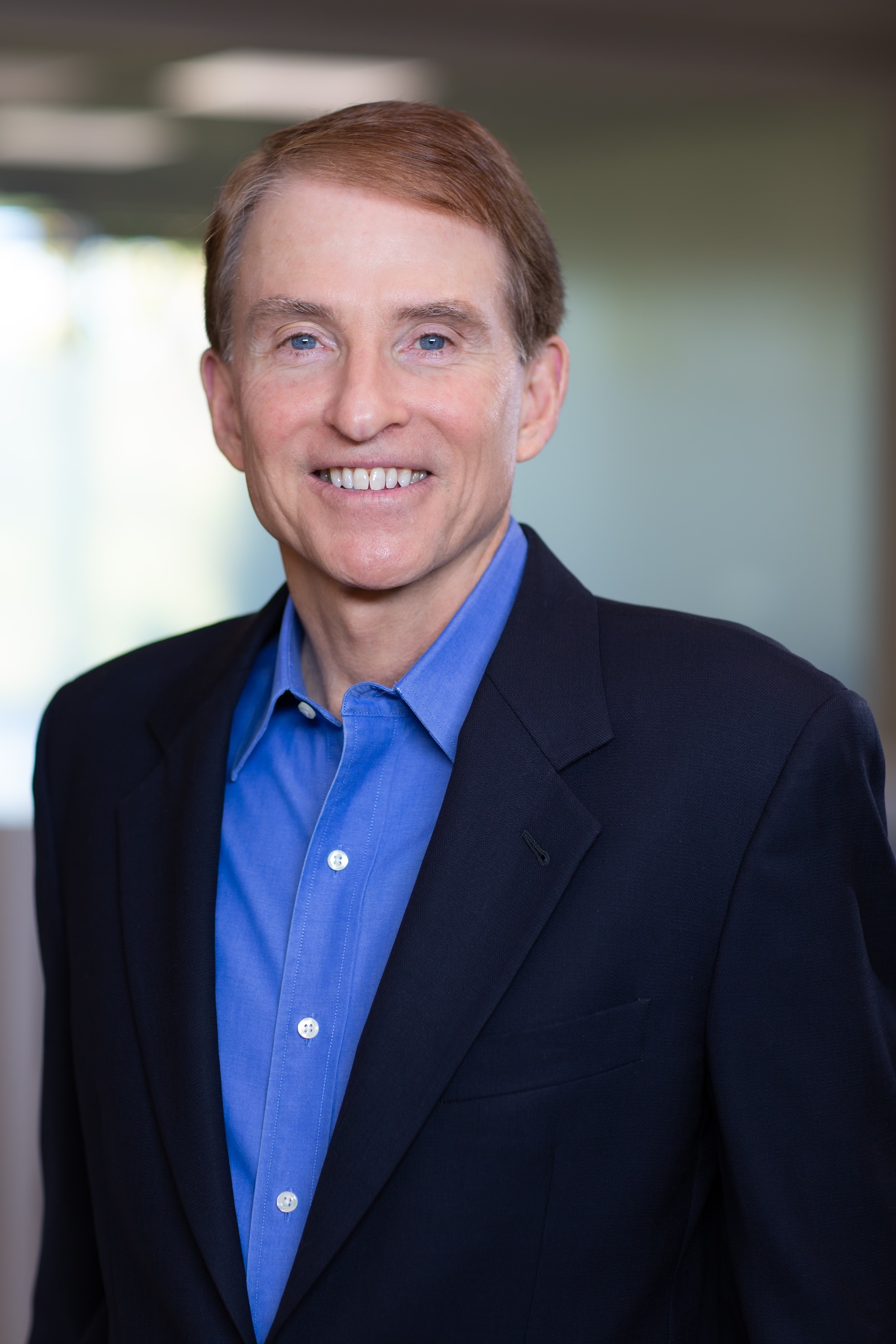
- Westly in 2024

30th Controller of California
- In office January 6, 2003 – January 8, 2007
- Governor: Gray Davis; Arnold Schwarzenegger
- Preceded by: Kathleen Connell
- Succeeded by: John Chiang

Personal details
- Born: 1956 or 1957 (age 69–70)
- Party: Democratic
- Education: Stanford University (BA, MBA)

Steve Westly (born 1956 or 1957) is an American venture capitalist, entrepreneur, educator, and politician. He was the state controller of California from 2003 to 2007 and was one of the top candidates in the Democratic primary for Governor of California in the 2006 election.

During the 2008 Presidential Election, Westly served as California campaign co-chair for Obama for America. Westly was briefly considered for a cabinet-level position in the Obama administration.

Currently, Westly is a managing partner at The Westly Group, a clean technology venture capital firm which he founded in 2007. The Westly Group was listed 79th out of 350 on Time Magazine's 2025 list of America's Top Venture Capital Firms.

The company has successfully raised five venture capital funds and has $825 million in Assets Under Management (AUM). The company has 30 of the world's largest strategic companies as investors including Duke Energy, VW/Audi, State Farm, Bridgestone, ABB, and American Electric Power. The Westly Group has had nine portfolio companies go public including four multi-billion dollar exits at Tesla Motors, Procore, Luminar, and Sentinel One. The company has offices in Silicon Valley, San Francisco, and Washington DC.

Steve Westly served as a lecturer at Stanford’s Graduate School of Business from 1991–1995. He returned to teach a new course at Stanford Graduate School of Business called "The Policy, Politics, and Finance for Solving Global Warming" 2020 to 2024 and continues to teach there today.

Westly is also a frequent commentator on CNBC, Bloomberg, Schwab Network, and other outlets. He has done over 100 interviews on live national television on Tesla, the future of electric vehicles, autonomous vehicles, new battery technologies, and the rise of the Chinese auto industry.

== Business ==
Steve Westly is the founding partner of the Westly Group, one of the largest venture funds in North America focused on smart energy, mobility, and buildings. The Westly Group has 22 of the world's largest strategic companies as investors, and has had nine IPOs, including Tesla Motors, where Westly served on the board. The Westly Group has had three companies go public over $8bn valuations in 2021 (SentinelOne at $13; Procore at $12.4bn; and Luminar at $8.2bn). The Westly Group has $750M under management and raised its fourth venture fund in December 2021.

In 1983, Westly became the New Business Manager at Sprint Telecommunications. In 1986, he became an investment banker at Valentine and Company (later called Bridgemere Capital) in San Francisco. In 1988, Westly became President of Codd & Date, a leading relational database consulting & services firm. In 1991, Westly became the deputy director of the City of San Jose Office of Economic Development and began teaching at the Stanford Graduate School of Business, where he taught for five years from 1991 to 1995.

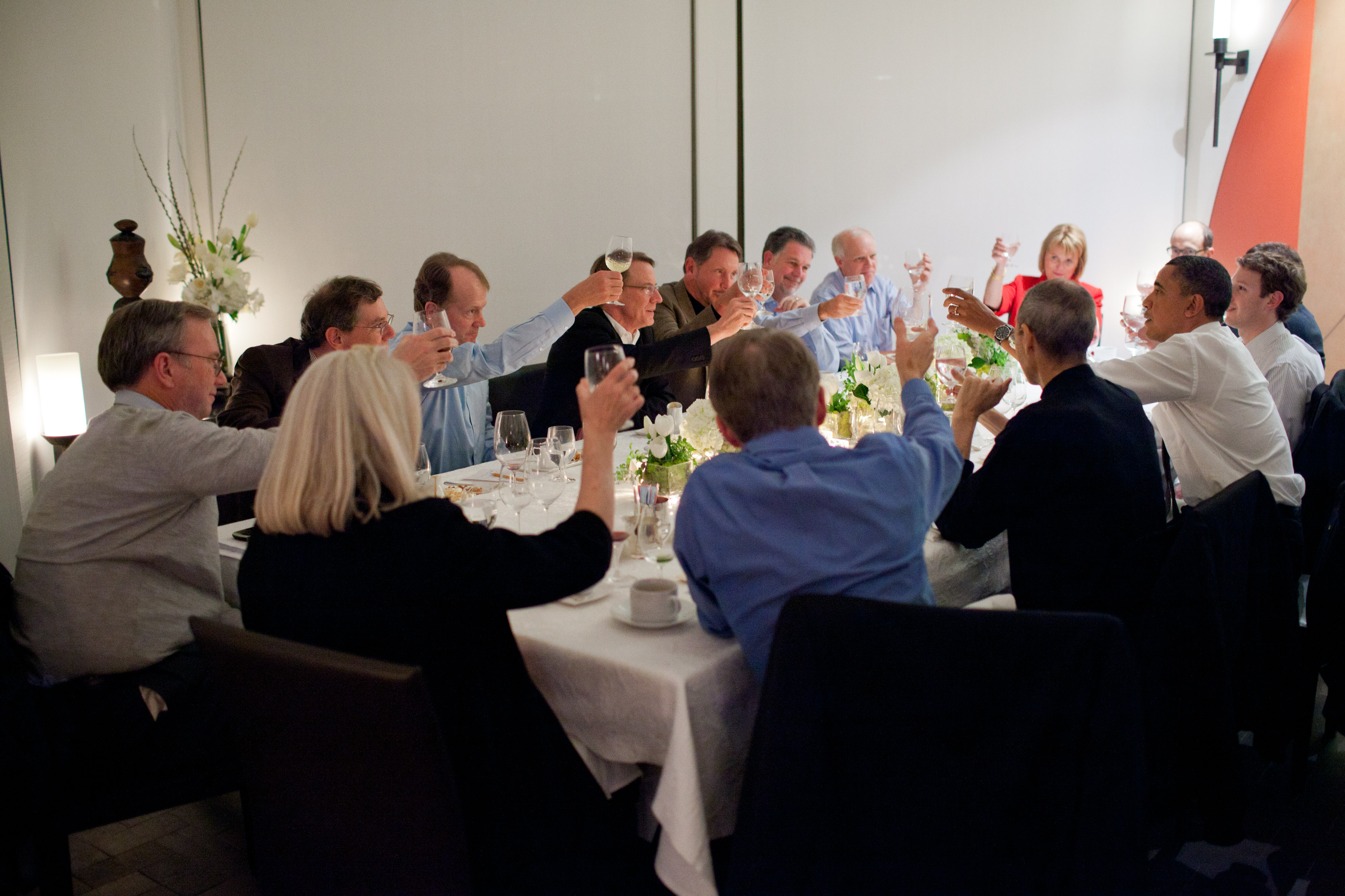
Steve Westly is seated next to Steve Jobs at the 'Tech Titans' Dinner in 2011 with President Obama, Mark Zuckerberg, Larry Ellison, Eric Schmidt, Reed Hastings, and more.

In 1994, he became the director of Netcom, one of the early large internet service providers and in 1995, became Vice President of WhoWhere?, then the largest Internet directory. In 1997, Westly joined eBay as one of its early executives. He began as vice president and subsequently gained the title of senior vice president for marketing, business development, and international. He retired from eBay in 2000 when he and his wife, Anita Yu, established the Westly Foundation.

In February 2007, Westly joined the board of Tesla Motors, a pioneering northern California manufacturer of electric cars. He is now a managing partner and founder of The Westly Group, one of the larger venture funds in the US focusing on smart energy, mobility, and buildings. The Westly Group has had nine companies go public on NASDAQ, including Tesla Motors.

== Political career ==
A member of the Democratic Party, Westly worked for Congressman Leo Ryan in 1978 as his first job out of college. Later that year, after Ryan's death on foreign soil at the hands of the Peoples Temple cult, he worked in the U.S. Department of Energy's Office of Solar and Conservation under President Jimmy Carter until 1980. After working in the Carter Administration, he joined the California Public Utilities Commission as special assistant to CPUC president John Bryson. While at CPUC, Westly had two books published on renewable energy and the future of the utility industry.

At age 23 in 1981, he was elected as northern treasurer of the California Democratic Party, the youngest party officer ever. He was subsequently elected state controller of the California Democratic Party in 1983, northern chair of the California Democratic Party in 1985, and vice chair of the California Democratic Party in 1987. In 1989, he was defeated as state chair of the California Democratic Party by Jerry Brown. Despite that loss, Westly continued his activism within the party by being elected to the Democratic National Committee in 1988, as the highest vote getter, and was reelected in 1992, 1996, and 2000.

=== California state controller ===
Westly ran for California state controller in 2002 against State Senator Tom McClintock and won by a margin of 22,730 votes (out of 7,258,758 votes cast). Westly garnered 3,289,839 (45.4%) votes, while McClintock won the support of 3,273,028 (45.1%) people. Three other candidates won 695,891 (9.5%) votes.

As controller, Westly opposed Governor Arnold Schwarzenegger's plan to change Proposition 98, which requires a certain amount of the state's budget to go towards funding public education and community colleges, and in 2005, he created a tax amnesty plan that allowed individuals and corporations who owed back taxes to prevent facing criminal charges and increased penalties if they would immediately pay their back taxes. Westly's plan brought in a gross amount of $4 billion in revenue for the State of California. The state's non-partisan Legislative Analyst's Office states that after refunds and advance payments the net profit of the tax amnesty plan was $380 million.

Westly also introduced the ReadyReturn plan to simplify tax preparation by offering to send taxpayers a prefilled form from the state, and allowing them to sign and automatically file their tax refund in a pilot program started in 2005. Westly is also in favor of enforcing current laws requiring Californians to pay sales tax on Internet purchases.

=== 2006 gubernatorial election ===
On June 19, 2005, Westly announced his candidacy for California governor. Despite entering the race long after his primary opponent, California State Treasurer Phil Angelides, Westly's campaign picked up considerable momentum, receiving endorsements from such figures as Lieutenant Governor Cruz Bustamante, Congressmembers Grace Napolitano, Diane Watson, and Brad Sherman, State Senators Carole Migden, Martha Escutia, and Nell Soto, County Supervisor Yvonne Burke, Assembly Members Judy Chu, Ted Lieu, Rudy Bermudez, and Nicole Parra, former Assembly Speaker and current Los Angeles City Councilman Herb Wesson, the majority of the Los Angeles City Council, and other elected officials at the federal, state, and local levels. Westly also gained the support of 85% of the major newspapers that endorsed in the race, including the San Francisco Chronicle, San Jose Mercury News, Los Angeles Daily News, LA Weekly, Fresno Bee, and many others. Several organizations also endorsed Westly, such as the California Sierra Club, California Police Chiefs Association, California NOW, and the Orange County Professional Firefighters Association.

In the months leading up to the election, Westly overcame an early Angelides advantage and gained the edge in various polls, leading by as much as 13 points. Moreover, unlike Angelides, he consistently beat Governor Schwarzenegger in hypothetical general election matchups.

Despite Westly's momentum and resources, the California Democratic Party endorsed Angelides at the State Democratic Party Convention. The race turned negative, highlighting environmental controversies surrounding Angelides' background as a real estate developer and Westly's broken pledge to keep his campaign clean. Westly's candidacy also was hurt by an unprecedented multi-million dollar independent expenditure by Sacramento real estate developer and longtime Angelides patron Angelo Tsakopoulos. As election day neared, Westly's momentum dissipated and the race tightened. A Field Poll held on June 2, 2006 had Westly leading Angelides by one percentage point, 35% to 34% with 26% undecided and an error size of +/- 4.5 points.

The high number of undecided voters led to the lowest turnout in a California primary election in over half a century. Despite over $80 million spent on the race, including over $35 million of Westly's own money, only 30.8% of California Democrats came out to vote, the lowest number in recent history. He was defeated in the Democratic primary by California State Treasurer Phil Angelides by 4%,48% to Westly's 44%. Westly endorsed Angelides' candidacy at a unity breakfast the morning after election night.

Angelides' Republican opponent, Arnold Schwarzenegger, has since used quotes from Westly's campaign to attack Angelides. Westly, who endorsed Angelides after the primary, countered, "Governor Schwarzenegger has shown great interest in what Steve Westly has to say about 2006. He is right here to tell you that we all need to vote for the Democratic candidate Phil Angelides in November 2006."

Phil Angelides was defeated in a landslide by Governor Arnold Schwarzenegger during the general election held on November 7, 2006 .

=== Later political career ===
Steve served as California campaign co-chair for President Obama's campaign and sat on the national finance committee. After the election of President Barack Obama in November 2008, it was rumored that Westly was being considered for appointment as secretary of energy, though Dr. Steven Chu was ultimately named to that position.

Westly's name was also figured in political speculation as a possible candidate for governor to succeed Schwarzenegger in 2010. Former governor Jerry Brown won the Democratic nomination and defeated Republican Meg Whitman (also a former eBay executive) in November 2010. Westly supported Brown for governor and hosted a Brown fundraiser in October 2010.

He was rumored to run again for Governor of California in 2018, however he did not file to run before the primary.

Westly returned to teach a new course at the Stanford Graduate School of Business called “The Technology, Politics, and Finance for Solving Global Warming” in the Spring of 2020 and continues to teach there today. Mr. Westly is also a frequent guest on CNBC and other business outlets discussing Tesla Motors and the future of Electric and Autonomous Vehicles. Mr. Westly has also had over 60 articles and op-eds printed in USA Today, the Los Angeles Times, the San Francisco Chronicle, San Jose Mercury News, San Diego Union-Tribune, and other outlets throughout the country.

== Personal life and education ==
Steve Westly was born in Arcadia, California, and raised in the San Francisco Bay Area. He received an A.B. in history from Stanford University in 1978, where he served as student body co-president. He received an M.B.A. from Stanford's Graduate School of Business in 1983.

Steve married Anita Yu (Chinese: 余慧雯), an immigrant from Hong Kong, in 1997. They have a daughter, Christina, and a son, Matthew.

His brother, Dean Westly, practices law in the Silicon Valley region of Northern California.

Political offices
Preceded by Kathleen Connell	Controller of California; 2003–2007	Succeeded by John Chiang
