= Libertarian Party of California =

State affiliate of the Libertarian Party

- Abbreviation: LPCA
- Chairperson: Loren Dean
- Founded: 1971; 55 years ago
- Headquarters: 428 J Street, Suite 400; Sacramento, CA 95814
- Membership (Oct 2025): ▼232,855
- Ideology: Libertarianism; Non-interventionism; Fiscal conservatism Economic liberalism Cultural liberalism Laissez-faire
- Senate: 0 / 40
- House of Representatives: 0 / 80
- U.S. Senate: 0 / 2
- U.S. House of Representatives: 0 / 52
- Statewide Executive Offices^{1}: 0 / 8
- Elected officials: 6 (June 2024)

Website
- ca.lp.org
- Politics of the United States; Political parties; Elections^{1}California Department of Education is a nonpartisan state executive position.

The Libertarian Party of California (LPC) is the California affiliate of the national Libertarian Party (LP). The party chairman is Adrian Malagon, and is based in Sacramento, California, in Sacramento County. As of 2026, Libertarians represent approximately 1.02% of the state's registered voters.

They have maintained continuous ballot access since 1980, which has long been considered a core goal for Libertarian Party state-level affiliates.

== History ==
In 1972, the party considered suing county clerks in Placer and Butte counties for refusing to allow voters to register as Libertarians. In 1978, Ed Clark, who had been the affiliate's chairman from 1973 to 1974 and later the national presidential candidate in 1980, ran as an independent for governor of California to gain party recognition and received over five percent. However, the Secretary of State ruled that the two percent requirement was for retaining party recognition and not gaining party recognition and that since Clark had run as an independent and not a Libertarian it would not count either way. The party filed a lawsuit against the decision, but it was first dismissed then ruled against on appeal. The Libertarian Party of California has hosted the Libertarian National Convention in 1977, 1979, 1980, and in 2000.

=== Participation of "independent" voters ===
Since January 2001, California has had a "modified" closed primary system in which political parties can determine whether or not to allow voters who are not affiliated with any party (i.e. "independent") to participate in the party's primary. The passage of Proposition 14 limited this "modified" closed primary system to primaries for President of the United States, starting with the 2012 primaries. For the first 15 years of the "modified" closed primary system, the California Libertarian Party did not allow "independent" voters to vote in Libertarian primaries. However, beginning with the 2016 Libertarian Party presidential primaries, the California Libertarian Party has allowed "independent" voters to vote in its presidential primaries.

=== County-wide executive office ===
In 2018 Jeff Hewett was elected to the Board of Supervisors in Riverside County. Representing approximately 2.5 million people, this was one of the most significant successes in the history of the Libertarian Party. It followed his term as Mayor of Calimesa, a city in Riverside, in which he avoided bankruptcy for the city by replacing their contract with the county fire department through building a municipal fire department.

== Current elected officials ==
All current Libertarian Party elected officials are in "nonpartisan" elected offices, meaning that the candidates' partisan affiliation is not listed on the ballot.

- Bob Karwin – Menifee City Council District 1.
- Brian Holtz – Purisima Hills Water District board member
- John Harrington – San Gabriel city councilor
- Kate O'Brien – Rancho Simi Recreation and Park District board member
- Nils Nehrenheim – Redondo Beach City Council District 1.
- Ryan Kelley – Imperial County Supervisor, District 4.

== Notable former elected officials ==
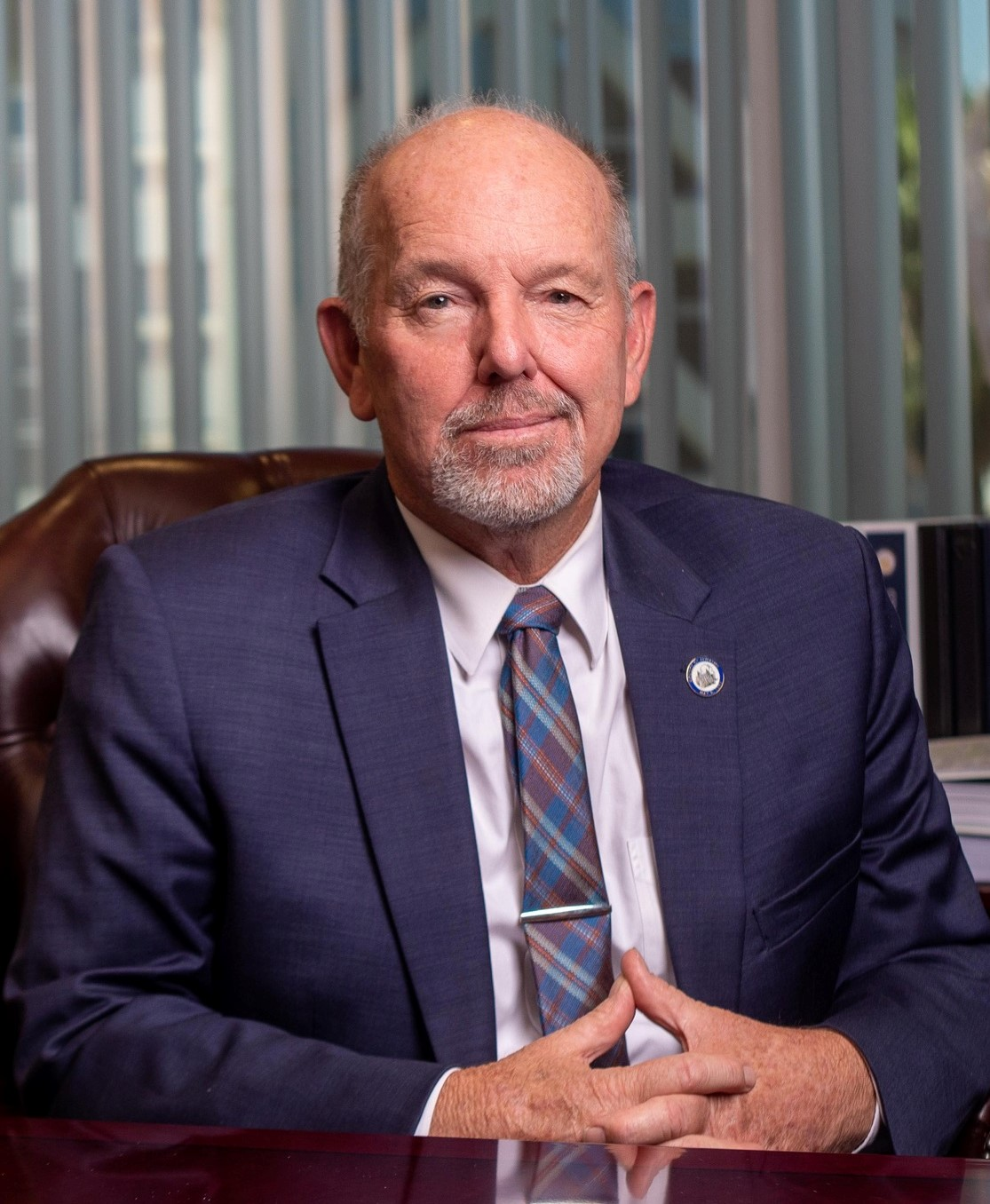
Riverside County Supervisor Jeff Hewitt

- Jeff Hewitt – District 5 Riverside County Supervisor board member (2019–2023) and former Calimesa city councilmember and Mayor
- Art Olivier – Bellflower city councilor and mayor (1994–1997; 1998–1999)

== Electoral performance ==
Year	Presidential nominee	Votes	Change
1972	John Hospers (write-in)	980 (0.1%)	Steady
1976	Roger MacBride	56,388 (0.7%)	▲0.7%
1980	Ed Clark	148,434 (1.7%)	▲1.0%
1984	David Bergland	49,951 (0.5%)	▼1.2%
1988	Ron Paul	70,105 (0.7%)	▲0.2%
1992	Andre Marrou	48,139 (0.4%)	▼0.3%
1996	Harry Browne	73,600 (0.7%)	▲0.3%
2000	Harry Browne	45,520 (0.4%)	▼0.3%
2004	Michael Badnarik	50,165 (0.4%)	▼0.0%
2008	Bob Barr	67,582 (0.5%)	▲0.1%
2012	Gary Johnson	143,221 (1.1%)	▲0.6%
2016	Gary Johnson	478,500 (3.4%)	▲2.3%
2020	Jo Jorgensen	187,895 (1.1%)	▼2.3%
2024	Chase Oliver	65,296 (0.4%)	▼0.6%

=== Senate Class I ===
Year	Senate nominee	Votes	Change
1982	Joseph Fuhrig	107,720 (1.4%)	Steady
1988	Jack Dean	79,997 (0.8%)	▼0.6%
1992	Richard Benjamin Boddie	247,799 (2.3%)	▲1.5%
1994	Richard Benjamin Boddie	179,100 (2.1%)	▼0.2%
2000	Gail Lightfoot	187,718 (1.8%)	▼0.3%
2006	Michael S. Metti	133,851 (1.6%)	▼0.2%
2012	Gail Lightfoot	101,648 (2.1%)	▲0.5%
2018	Derrick Michael Reid	59,999 (0.9%)	▼1.2%

=== Senate Class III ===
Year	Senate nominee	Votes	Change
1980	David Bergland	202,481 (2.4%)	Steady
1986	Breck McKinley	66,261 (0.9%)	▼1.5%
1992	June R. Genis	235,919 (2.2%)	▲1.3%
1998	Ted Brown	93,926 (1.1%)	▲1.1%
2004	Jim Gray	216,522 (1.8%)	▲0.7%
2010	Gail Lightfoot	175,235 (1.8%)	▼0.1%
2016	Gail Lightfoot; Mark Matthew Herd	141,105 (1.9%) (Note: Combined)	▼0.1%

=== Gubernatorial ===
Year	Gubernatorial nominee	Votes	Change
1978	Ed Clark (Note: Ran as independent.)	377,960 (5.5%)	▼0.6%
1982	Dan P. Dougherty	81,076 (1.0%)	▼4.4%
1986	Joseph Fuhrig	52,628 (0.7%)	▼0.3%
1990	Dennis Thompson	145,628 (1.9%)	▲1.2%
1994	Richard Rider	149,281 (1.7%)	▼0.2%
1998	Steve Kubby	73,845 (0.9%)	▼0.8%
2002	Gary David Copeland	161,203 (2.2%)	▲1.3%
2003	Ned Roscoe; Ken Hamidi; John Hickey	5,887 (0.1%)	▼2.1%
2006	Art Olivier	114,329 (1.3%)	▲1.3%
2010	Dale Ogden	150,898 (1.5%)	▲0.2%
2014	None	None	▼1.5%
2018	Zoltan Istvan; Nickolas Wildstar	26,028 (0.4%)	▲0.4%
2021	Jeff Hewitt	50,378 (0.7%)	▲0.3%

=== Lieutenant Gubernatorial ===
Year	Lieutenant nominee	Votes	Change
1994	Bob New	180,896 (2.1%)	Steady
1998	Thomas Tryon	109,888 (1.4%)	▼0.8%
2002	Pat Wright	104,920 (1.4%)	▲0.1%
2006	Lynnette Shaw	142,851 (1.7%)	▲0.2%
2010	Pamela Brown	574,640 (5.9%)	▲4.2%
2014	None	None	▼5.9%
2018	Tim Ferreira	99,949 (1.5%)	▲1.5%

=== Attorney General ===
Year	Attorney General nominee	Votes	Change
1994	Richard N. Burns	274,335 (3.3%)	Steady
1998	Joseph S. Farina	149,430 (1.9%)	▼1.5%
2002	Ed Kuwatch	127,152 (1.8%)	▼0.1%
2006	Kenneth Weissman	177,469 (2.1%)	▲0.3%
2010	Timothy J. Hannan	246,583 (2.6%)	▲0.5%
2014	Jonathan Jaech	99,056 (2.4%)	▼0.1%
2018	None	None	▼2.4%

=== Secretary of State ===
Year	Secretary of State nominee	Votes	Change
1994	Peggy Christensen	248,748 (3.0%)	Steady
1998	Gail Lightfoot	216,853 (2.7%)	▼0.3%
2002	Gail Lightfoot	204,527 (2.8%)	▼0.1%
2006	Gail Lightfoot	171,393 (2.0%)	▼0.8%
2010	Christina Tobin	157,974 (2.2%)	▲0.2%
2014	None	None	▼2.2%
2018	Gail Lightfoot	155,879 (2.4%)	▲2.4%

=== State Treasurer ===
Year	State Treasurer nominee	Votes	Change
1994	John Petersen	335,452 (4.1%)	Steady
1998	John Petersen	183,436 (2.3%)	▼1.8%
2002	Marian Smithson	168,401 (2.3%)	▲0.0%
2006	Marian Smithson	334,056 (4.%)	▲1.7%
2010	Edward Teyssier	217,818 (2.3%)	▼1.7%
2014	None	None	▼2.3%
2018	None	None	Steady

=== State Controller ===
Year	State Controller nominee	Votes	Change
1994	Cullene Marie Lang	128,378 (1.6%)	Steady
1998	Pamela Pescosolido	147,397 (1.8%)	▼0.3%
2002	None	None	▼1.8%
2006	Donna Tello	188,934 (2.7%)	▲2.7%
2010	Andrew Favor	291,657 (3.0%)	▲0.77%
2014	None	None	▼3.0%
2018	None	None	Steady

=== Insurance Commissioner ===
Year	Insurance Commissioner nominee	Votes	Change
1994	Ted Brown	346,007 (4.2%)	Steady
1998	Dale Ogden	169,922 (2.1%)	▼2.1%
2002	Dale Ogden	236,688 (3.3%)	▲1.2%
2006	Dale Ogden	305,772 (3.7%)	▲0.4%
2010	Richard Bronstein	362,037 (4.0%)	▲0.3%
2014	None	None	▼4.0%
2018	None	None	Steady

=== State Assembly ===
Year	Number of candidates	Votes	Change
1992	46	343,366 (3.3%)	Steady
1994	35	166,510 (2.1%)	▼1.2%
1996	26	142,577 (1.5%)	▼0.5%
1998	38	144,427 (1.9%)	▲0.3%
2000	52	316,668 (2.8%)	▼1.0%
2002	36	162,472 (2.4%)	▼0.48%
2004	34	324,414 (2.9%)	▲0.3%
2006	21	122,036 (1.5%)	▼1.3%
2008	15	171,324 (1.4%)	▼0.1%
2010	18	115,714 (1.2%)	▼0.2%
2012	0	0 (0.0%)	▼1.2%
2014	1	30,735 (0.4%)	▲0.4%
2016	4	130,798 (1.0%)	▲0.6%
2018	5	145,514 (1.2%)	▲0.2%

== Voter registration ==
Libertarian voter registration in the state of California has experienced significant growth.

Year	Registered voters	Voter gain or loss from previous year
2021	204,345	▲8,237
2020	196,108	▲42,760
2019	153,348	▲11,980
2018	141,368	▼93
2017	141,461	▲1,656
2016	139,805	▲17,929
2015	121,876	▲1,072
2014	120,804	▲11,168
2013	109,636	▲900
2012	108,736	▲16,490
2011	92,246	▲1,135
2010	91,111	▲7,748
2009	83,363	▼211
2008	83,574	▲154
2007	83,420	▼45
2006	83,465	▼503
2005	83,968	▼5,649
2004	89,617	▲77
2003	89,540	▼955
2002	90,495	▼2,865
2001	93,360	▼1,540
2000	94,900	▲12,561
1999	82,339	

== Governance ==
The Libertarian Party of California is a "political party that has detailed statutory provisions applicable to its operation", which are in division 7, part 3 of the California Elections Code. The Libertarian State Central Committee, the governing body of the Libertarian Party of California, functions pursuant to its standing rules and bylaws. The regular officers of the Central Committee are the chairman, two regional vice chairmen, secretary, and treasurer.

=== County central committees ===
There are semi-autonomous county central committees for many of California's 58 counties. The counties which currently have active affiliates are as follows:

- Alameda
- Contra Costa
- El Dorado
- Kern
- Kings
- Los Angeles
- Monterey
- Nevada
- Orange
- Placer
- Riverside
- Sacramento
- San Bernardino
- San Diego
- San Francisco
- San Mateo
- Santa Clara
- Ventura
- Yolo

== See also ==
- List of state Libertarian Parties in the United States
