= Kathleen Connell =

American businesswoman, journalist, entrepreneur, and academic

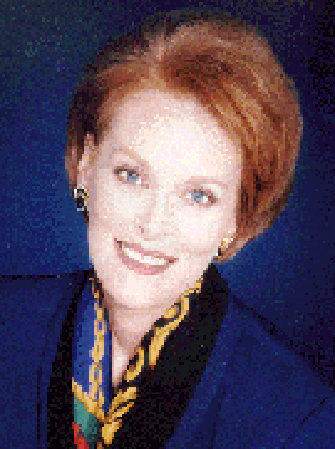

California State Controller
- In office January 2, 1995 – January 6, 2003
- Governor: Pete Wilson; Gray Davis
- Preceded by: Gray Davis
- Succeeded by: Steve Westly

Personal details
- Party: Democratic

Kathleen Connell is an American businesswoman, journalist, entrepreneur, and academic. She was the California State Controller from 1995 until 2003. She was the first woman to serve in the position.

As controller she served as a trustee of CalPERS and CalSTRS, which together comprise the largest pool of retirement assets in the world, for eight years. Among the program innovations as State Controller: the postcard tax return (the first in the nation); the Unclaimed Property Program, a national online searchable database, returning $2 billion to US residents; the California Y2K Financial Network, a multi-finance industry task force, created to successfully execute the rollover of all State financial systems, and the Citizen's Report Card, honored with a prestigious national achievement award for seven years for transparency in government financial reporting.

== Elections ==
In 1994, she defeated ex-State Assemblyman Tom McClintock for California State Controller.

In 1998, she won re-election, in a landslide vote, against Ruben Barrales. In that election, she won 55 of 58 California's counties.

== Academics ==
She served as Chair of the Corporate Directors Center at UC Berkeley Haas School of Business and on faculty in the Executive MBA Program (2004-2011). She was on faculty at UCLA Anderson School of Management and Founder/Chair of the Center for Finance and Real Estate. She has also taught at Georgetown University McDonough School of Business.

== Work and personal life ==
Connell is the founder and currently CEO of an early-stage tech company and has been an investment banker in New York City and Los Angeles. She holds five security licenses.

Connell has a Ph.D. from UCLA and resides in Washington, D.C.

== Writing ==
Connell has written for The Christian Science Monitor and HuffPost Her book, Moving up to millions: the life calculator guide to wealth. was published in 2007.

Political offices
Preceded by Gray Davis	California State Controller; 1995–2003	Succeeded by Steve Westly
