= California State Controller =

Chief financial officer of the U.S. state of California

State Controller of California
- Seal of the California state controller

- State flag

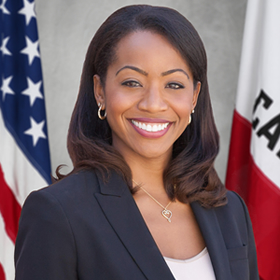
- Incumbent; Malia Cohen since January 2, 2023
- Government of California
- Style: The Honorable
- Term length: Four years, two term limit
- Inaugural holder: John S. Houston; 1849
- Formation: California Constitution
- Succession: Seventh
- Website: www.sco.ca.gov

The state controller of California is a constitutional office in the executive branch of the government of the U.S. state of California. Thirty-three individuals have held the office of state controller since statehood. The incumbent is Malia Cohen, a Democrat. The state controller's main office is located at 300 Capitol Mall in Sacramento.

== Election and term of office ==
The state controller assumes office by way of election. The term of office is four years, renewable once. Elections for state controller are held on a four-year basis concurrently with elections for the offices of governor, lieutenant governor, attorney general, secretary of state, state treasurer, insurance commissioner, and superintendent of public instruction.

== Powers and duties ==
As California's chief fiscal officer, the state controller has broad superintending authority over the accounting and disbursement of state and local government finances. As such, the state controller:

- Acts as the state's accountant. This role entails maintaining the statewide accounting system, recording and adjusting state agency transactions, issuing reports to stakeholders on the financial condition and operations of the state, approving claims against the state, administering payroll to state employees, ordering deposits into the state treasury, and drawing warrants and approving electronic fund transfers.
- Administers California's unclaimed property laws. As such, the state controller audits holders of unclaimed property, safeguards unclaimed property reported to the office, and works to return unclaimed property to its rightful owners.
- Audits public funds spent by state agencies. The state controller is the internal auditor for the state of California and its agencies, examining the internal controls of state agencies, the state lottery, and oil and gas lease royalties to assure operational effectiveness and efficiency, reliable financial reporting, and legal compliance. A separate state auditor serves as the external auditor for the whole of state government and reports exclusively to the Legislature on state agency financial management and performance.
- Supervises local government finances. As part of this function, the state controller has broad discretion to audit any state funds spent by local governments. Moreover, the state controller prescribes uniform accounting, budgeting, and financial reporting systems applicable to nearly 5,000 counties, cities, towns, school districts, local housing authorities, rural development authorities, and all other political subdivisions of the state. Local government accounting and auditing aside, the state controller also reviews the annual financial and single audits performed by external auditors on behalf of California's local governments for conformity with the law and Government Auditing Standards. Likewise, the state controller collects, apportions, and distributes property taxes and other state aids among California's many counties, cities, towns, and school districts.

In addition to the office's functional responsibilities, the state controller serves on over 70 boards and commissions, including the California State Lands Commission, California State Teachers’ Retirement System, California Public Employees’ Retirement System, California Board of Equalization, California Franchise Tax Board, California Pollution Control Financing Authority, the California Debt Limit Allocation Commission, California Alternative Energy Source Financing Authority, the California Education Facilities Authority, and the California Victim Compensation Board, among others.

== Staff ==
The office has a staff of deputy state controllers that help the state controller fulfill her elected duties, including sitting on the Board of Equalization and other boards for the state controller in absentia. Noted former deputy state controllers include Barrett McInerney, James Burton, and Laurette Healey.

== List of California state controllers ==
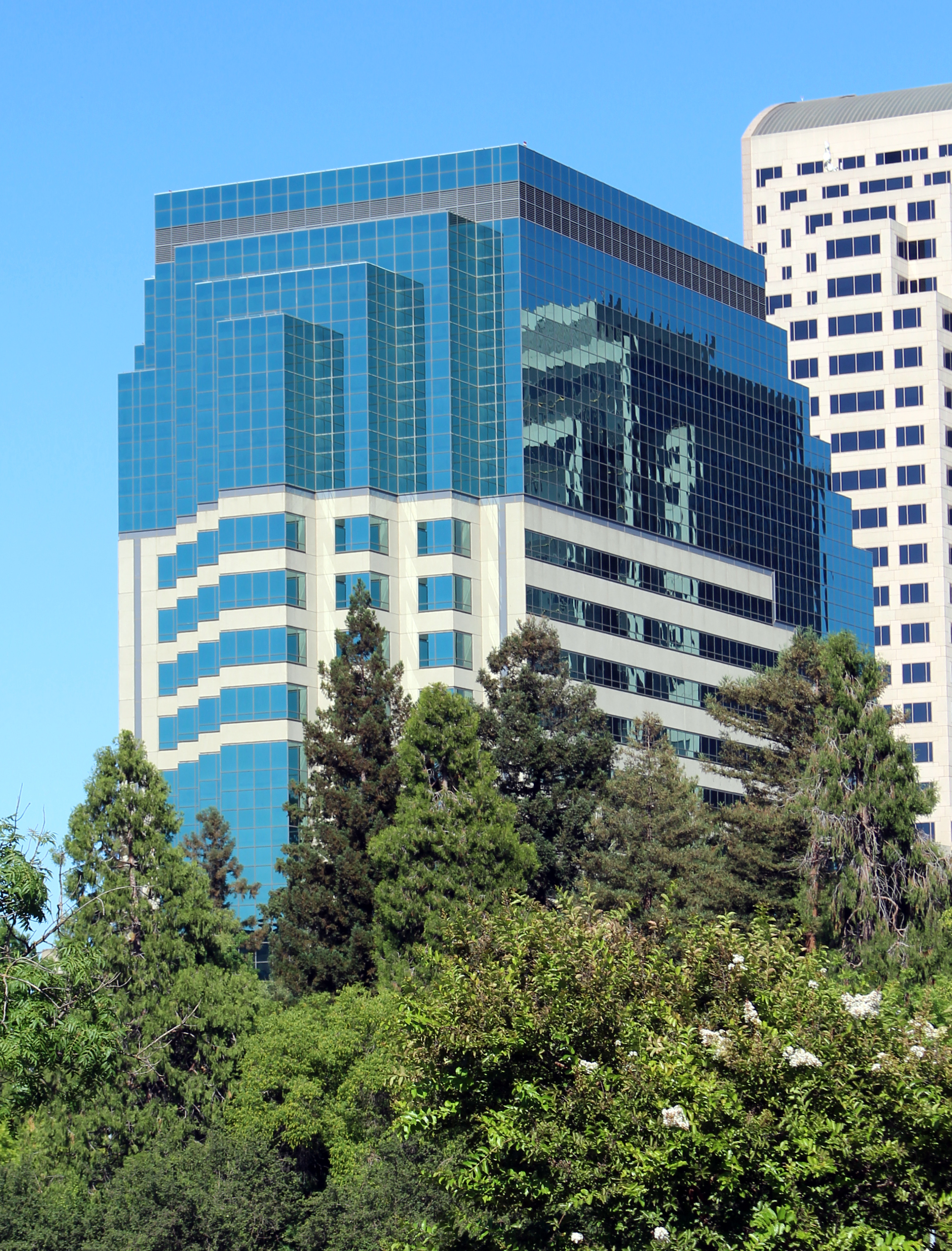
300 Capitol Mall is home to several state agencies including the Controller's Office

Name	Party	Term
John S. Houston	Democratic	1849–1852
Winslow S. Pierce	Democratic	1852–1854
Samuel Bell	Democratic	1854–1856
George W. Whitman	American	1856–1857
Edward F. Burton	American	1857
George W. Whitman	American	1857–1858
Aaron R. Melony	Lecompton Democrat	1858–1860
Samuel H. Brooks	Lecompton Democrat	1860–1861
James S. Gillan	Democratic	1861–1862
Gilbert R. Warren	Republican	1862–1863
George R. Oulton	National Union	1863–1867
Robert Watt	Democratic	1867–1871
James J. Green	Republican	1871–1875
James W. Mandeville	Democratic	1875–1876
William B. C. Brown	Democratic	1876–1877
Daniel M. Kenfield	Republican	1877–1883
John P. Dunn	Democratic	1883–1891
Edward P. Colgan	Republican	1891–1906
A. B. Nye	Republican	1906–1913
John S. Chambers	Republican	1913–1920
Ray L. Riley	Republican	1921–1937
Harry B. Riley	Republican	1937–1946
Thomas Kuchel	Republican	1946–1953
Robert C. Kirkwood	Republican	1953–1959
Alan Cranston	Democratic	1959–1967
Houston I. Flournoy	Republican	1967–1975
Kenneth Cory	Democratic	1975–1987
Gray Davis	Democratic	1987–1995
Kathleen Connell	Democratic	1995–2003
Steve Westly	Democratic	2003–2007
John Chiang	Democratic	2007–2015
Betty Yee	Democratic	2015–2023
Malia Cohen	Democratic	2023–present
