= California State and Consumer Services Agency =

State cabinet-level agency of the executive branch of California

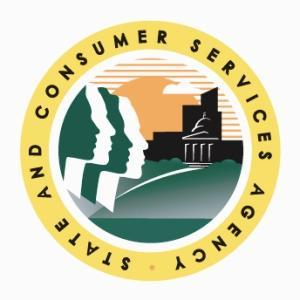
- Seal

Agency overview
- Dissolved: July 1, 2013
- Superseding agency: Business, Consumer Services and Housing Agency
- Jurisdiction: California
- Agency executive: Secretary

The California State and Consumer Services Agency (SCSA) was a state cabinet-level agency of the executive branch of California. It was replaced by the California Business, Consumer Services and Housing Agency (BCSH) effective July 1, 2013. A significant number of the departments were transferred to the California Government Operations Agency when it was formed on July 1, 2013.

The entities under SCSA were responsible for civil rights enforcement, licensing and consumer protection of more than 255 different professions, procurement of goods and services for state agencies, management and development of state real estate, oversight of two state employee pension funds, collecting state taxes, hiring of state employees, providing information technology services, adopting state building standards and the administration of two state museums." As of 2008-2009, SCSA's entities had over 16,000 employees and a budget of almost $27 billion. The Secretary of the State and Consumer Services Agency served as the Chair of the California Victim Compensation and Government Claims Board.

The agency was last headquartered at the Unruh Building in Sacramento.

== Organization ==
The SCSA included the following departments, boards, commissions and museums:

- California African American Museum (CAAM)
- Building Standards Commission (BSC)
- California Public Employees' Retirement System (CalPERS)
- California Science Center (CSC)
- California State Teachers' Retirement System (CalSTRS)
- Department of Consumer Affairs (DCA)
- Department of Fair Employment and Housing (DFEH)
- Department of General Services (DGS)
- Department of Technology Services (DTS)
- Exposition Park
- Fair Employment and Housing Commission (FEHC)
- Franchise Tax Board (FTB)
- Office of Information Security and Privacy Protection (OISPP)
- Office of the Insurance Advisor (OIA)
- California Seismic Safety Commission|Seismic Safety Commission (SSC)
- State Personnel Board (SPB)
- Victim Compensation and Government Claims Board (VCGCB)

== Accomplishments ==
The notable accomplishments of SCSA included:

- In 2005, it completed a review of state-owned vehicles.
- In 2007, it co-sponsored a statewide "Green California Summit and Exposition."
- In 2008, it created Kids Corner, "a Web site designed to bring government closer to children."
