= Contra Costa =

Contra Costa refers to Contra Costa County, California and many things within or adjacent to its borders, including:

== Population centers ==
- Contra Costa Centre, California

== Transit ==
- Contra Costa (railroad ferryboat)
- Pleasant Hill/Contra Costa Centre station
- Alameda-Contra Costa Transit District
- Eastern Contra Costa Transit Authority
- Western Contra Costa Transit Authority

== Water ==
- Contra Costa Canal
- Contra Costa Water District

== Schools ==
- Contra Costa Community College District
  - Contra Costa College
- West Contra Costa Unified School District

== Other governmental bodies ==
- Arts and Culture Commission of Contra Costa County
- Contra Costa County Board of Supervisors
- Contra Costa County Employees' Retirement Association
- Contra Costa County Library
- Contra Costa County Superior Court
- Central Contra Costa Sanitary District
- West Contra Costa County Detention Center

== Newspaper ==
- Contra Costa Times

== Related lists ==
- California Historical Landmarks in Contra Costa County
- National Register of Historic Places listings in Contra Costa County, California
