= 2018 California State Controller election =

- November 6, 2018
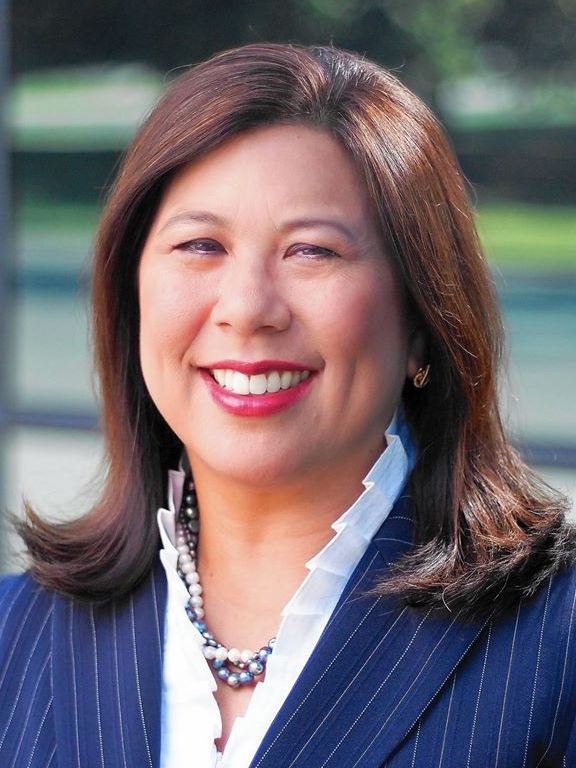

Candidate	Betty Yee	Konstantinos Roditis
Party	Democratic	Republican
Popular vote	8,013,067	4,229,480
Percentage	65.45%	34.55%
- County results Yee: 50–60% 60–70% 70–80% 80–90% Roditis: 50–60% 60–70%
Controller before election
Betty Yee
Democratic
Elected Controller
Betty Yee
Democratic

The 2018 California state controller election was held on November 6, 2018, to elect the California state controller. Democratic incumbent Betty Yee won re-election to a second term, defeating Republican City Commissioner Konstantinos Roditis.

== Candidates ==
=== Democratic Party ===
==== Declared ====
- Betty Yee, incumbent California state controller

=== Republican Party ===
==== Declared ====
- Konstantinos Roditis, former Anaheim city commissioner

=== Peace and Freedom Party ===
==== Declared ====
- Mary Lou Finley, retired public school worker

== Primary election ==
=== Endorsements ===
Betty Yee

Organizations

- AFSCME District Council 57
- California Democratic Party
- California Faculty Association
- California League of Conservation Voters
- California Nurses Association/National Nurses United
- California State Retirees Association
- California Teachers Association
- Communication Workers of America – District 9
- EMILY's List
- Equality California
- Feminist Majority
- National Association of Realtors – California
- Planned Parenthood Affiliates of California
- Service Employees International Union – California
- UNITE HERE

Newspapers

- Los Angeles Times
- The Mercury News
- The San Diego Union-Tribune
- San Francisco Chronicle
Konstantinos Roditis

Organizations

- California Republican Party

Newspapers

- Dixon Independent Voice
- Placerville Mountain Democrat
- Santa Barbara News-Press

=== Results ===
Results by county Yee: 40–50%; 50–60%; 60–70%; 70–80%; 80–90%; Roditis: 40–50%; 50–60%; 60–70%

Blanket primary results
Party	Candidate	Votes	%
Democratic	Betty Yee (incumbent)	4,033,208	62.09%
Republican	Konstantinos Roditis	2,200,942	33.88%
Peace and Freedom	Mary Lou Finley	261,876	4.03%
Total votes		6,496,026	100.00%

==== By county ====
County	Betty Yee Democratic		Konstantinos Roditis Republican		Mary Lou Finley Peace and Freedom		Margin		Total
County	#	%	#	%	#	%	#	%	Total
Alameda	250,088	80.56%	47,107	15.17%	13,245	4.27%	202,981	65.38%	310,440
Alpine	265	67.60%	116	29.59%	11	2.81%	149	38.01%	392
Amador	5,254	43.27%	6,305	51.92%	584	4.81%	-1,051	-8.66%	12,143
Butte	27,477	52.23%	22,553	42.87%	2,578	4.90%	4,924	9.36%	52,608
Calaveras	6,325	42.93%	7,668	52.05%	740	5.02%	-1,343	-9.12%	14,733
Colusa	1,399	42.11%	1,787	53.79%	136	4.09%	-388	-11.68%	3,322
Contra Costa	142,898	70.85%	50,152	24.87%	8,632	4.28%	92,746	45.99%	201,682
Del Norte	2,412	46.21%	2,533	48.52%	275	5.27%	-121	-2.32%	5,220
El Dorado	25,836	47.46%	26,867	49.35%	1,740	3.20%	-1,031	-1.89%	54,443
Fresno	67,788	52.93%	54,656	42.68%	5,619	4.39%	13,132	10.25%	128,063
Glenn	1,669	34.65%	2,920	60.62%	228	4.73%	-1,251	-25.97%	4,817
Humboldt	19,643	65.66%	8,554	28.59%	1,720	5.75%	11,089	37.07%	29,917
Imperial	10,762	58.63%	5,814	31.67%	1,780	9.70%	4,948	26.96%	18,356
Inyo	2,523	46.26%	2,619	48.02%	312	5.72%	-96	-1.76%	5,454
Kern	42,329	37.65%	64,550	57.41%	5,562	4.95%	-22,221	-19.76%	112,441
Kings	6,420	40.91%	8,637	55.04%	636	4.05%	-2,217	-14.13%	15,693
Lake	7,276	55.67%	5,082	38.89%	711	5.44%	2,194	16.79%	13,069
Lassen	2,040	34.03%	3,707	61.85%	247	4.12%	-1,667	-27.81%	5,994
Los Angeles	952,017	70.49%	338,373	25.05%	60,194	4.46%	613,644	45.44%	1,350,584
Madera	9,423	41.19%	12,194	53.30%	1,262	5.52%	-2,771	-12.11%	22,879
Marin	63,875	81.53%	12,315	15.72%	2,154	2.75%	51,560	65.81%	78,344
Mariposa	2,479	43.05%	3,010	52.27%	270	4.69%	-531	-9.22%	5,759
Mendocino	14,655	69.97%	5,194	24.80%	1,096	5.23%	9,461	45.17%	20,945
Merced	15,600	52.13%	12,773	42.68%	1,553	5.19%	2,827	9.45%	29,926
Modoc	850	31.50%	1,717	63.64%	131	4.86%	-867	-32.13%	2,698
Mono	1,885	59.04%	1,176	36.83%	132	4.13%	709	22.20%	3,193
Monterey	43,173	68.26%	17,470	27.62%	2,602	4.11%	25,703	40.64%	63,245
Napa	22,209	66.34%	9,996	29.86%	1,274	3.81%	12,213	36.48%	33,479
Nevada	20,126	56.45%	14,218	39.88%	1,308	3.67%	5,908	16.57%	35,652
Orange	274,892	49.19%	262,159	46.91%	21,803	3.90%	12,733	2.28%	558,854
Placer	50,754	49.08%	49,231	47.61%	3,430	3.32%	1,523	1.47%	103,415
Plumas	2,955	47.14%	3,092	49.33%	221	3.53%	-137	-2.19%	6,268
Riverside	152,294	47.66%	155,301	48.60%	11,977	3.75%	-3,007	-0.94%	319,572
Sacramento	179,626	64.17%	90,518	32.34%	9,757	3.49%	89,108	31.84%	279,901
San Benito	6,944	58.81%	4,177	35.37%	687	5.82%	2,767	23.43%	11,808
San Bernardino	127,606	47.94%	125,672	47.22%	12,877	4.84%	1,934	0.73%	266,155
San Diego	365,720	57.20%	254,088	39.74%	19,527	3.05%	111,632	17.46%	639,335
San Francisco	174,517	86.10%	19,113	9.43%	9,071	4.48%	155,404	76.67%	202,701
San Joaquin	55,971	54.27%	42,512	41.22%	4,656	4.51%	13,459	13.05%	103,139
San Luis Obispo	45,226	55.05%	33,993	41.38%	2,932	3.57%	11,233	13.67%	82,151
San Mateo	107,760	77.09%	27,506	19.68%	4,515	3.23%	80,254	57.41%	139,781
Santa Barbara	51,762	61.05%	30,401	35.86%	2,620	3.09%	21,361	25.19%	84,783
Santa Clara	245,596	73.03%	79,840	23.74%	10,862	3.23%	165,756	49.29%	336,298
Santa Cruz	52,123	77.25%	12,421	18.41%	2,932	4.35%	39,702	58.84%	67,476
Shasta	15,578	35.48%	26,209	59.69%	2,124	4.84%	-10,631	-24.21%	43,911
Sierra	638	45.90%	668	48.06%	84	6.04%	-30	-2.16%	1,390
Siskiyou	5,032	45.85%	5,388	49.09%	556	5.07%	-356	-3.24%	10,976
Solano	49,622	63.20%	25,235	32.14%	3,658	4.66%	24,387	31.06%	78,515
Sonoma	92,608	74.64%	26,879	21.66%	4,580	3.69%	65,729	52.98%	124,067
Stanislaus	42,579	50.83%	37,665	44.96%	3,523	4.21%	4,914	5.87%	83,767
Sutter	8,149	42.33%	10,142	52.68%	960	4.99%	-1,993	-10.35%	19,251
Tehama	4,709	34.03%	8,346	60.32%	781	5.64%	-3,637	-26.29%	13,836
Trinity	1,945	50.03%	1,703	43.80%	240	6.17%	242	6.22%	3,888
Tulare	22,133	40.82%	29,774	54.91%	2,314	4.27%	-7,641	-14.09%	54,221
Tuolumne	6,821	44.96%	7,714	50.85%	636	4.19%	-893	-5.89%	15,171
Ventura	85,812	55.22%	63,888	41.11%	5,703	3.67%	21,924	14.11%	155,403
Yolo	30,737	71.28%	10,891	25.26%	1,491	3.46%	19,846	46.03%	43,119
Yuba	4,392	38.68%	6,337	55.80%	627	5.52%	-1,945	-17.13%	11,356
Totals	4,033,197	62.09%	2,200,926	33.88%	261,876	4.03%	1,832,271	28.21%	6,495,999

== General election ==
=== Results ===
Yee won the election easily. She won by running up margins in heavily populated areas of the state. With 8,013,067 votes, Yee is the top vote earner in any California state controller election.

2018 California state controller election
Party	Candidate	Votes	%	±%
Democratic	Betty Yee (incumbent)	8,013,067	65.45%	+11.48%
Republican	Konstantinos Roditis	4,229,480	34.55%	−11.48%
Total votes		12,242,547	100.00%	N/A
Democratic hold				

==== By county ====
County	Betty Yee Democratic		Konstantinos Roditis Republican		Margin		Total votes cast
County	#	%	#	%	#	%	Total votes cast
Alameda	470,001	83.10%	95,614	16.90%	374,387	66.19%	565,615
Alpine	411	67.49%	198	32.51%	213	34.98%	609
Amador	7,252	41.91%	10,051	58.09%	-2,799	-16.18%	17,303
Butte	45,299	52.05%	41,739	47.95%	3,560	4.09%	87,038
Calaveras	8,854	41.69%	12,384	58.31%	-3,530	-16.62%	21,238
Colusa	2,420	43.13%	3,191	56.87%	-771	-13.74%	5,611
Contra Costa	293,665	72.30%	112,515	27.70%	181,150	44.60%	406,180
Del Norte	3,872	46.86%	4,391	53.14%	-519	-6.28%	8,263
El Dorado	40,365	45.94%	47,503	54.06%	-7,138	-8.12%	87,868
Fresno	138,001	55.36%	111,257	44.64%	26,744	10.73%	249,258
Glenn	2,949	36.13%	5,213	63.87%	-2,264	-27.74%	8,162
Humboldt	35,723	68.79%	16,211	31.21%	19,512	37.57%	51,934
Imperial	22,486	68.05%	10,556	31.95%	11,930	36.11%	33,042
Inyo	3,529	49.12%	3,656	50.88%	-127	-1.77%	7,185
Kern	90,343	44.95%	110,654	55.05%	-20,311	-10.11%	200,997
Kings	13,867	46.37%	16,039	53.63%	-2,172	-7.26%	29,906
Lake	11,881	57.02%	8,955	42.98%	2,926	14.04%	20,836
Lassen	2,701	30.30%	6,212	69.70%	-3,511	-39.39%	8,913
Los Angeles	2,160,445	74.86%	725,426	25.14%	1,435,019	49.73%	2,885,871
Madera	16,669	43.78%	21,408	56.22%	-4,739	-12.45%	38,077
Marin	102,895	81.08%	24,003	18.92%	78,892	62.17%	126,898
Mariposa	3,477	42.65%	4,675	57.35%	-1,198	-14.70%	8,152
Mendocino	23,246	71.03%	9,483	28.97%	13,763	42.05%	32,729
Merced	33,180	57.05%	24,982	42.95%	8,198	14.10%	58,162
Modoc	1,040	30.69%	2,349	69.31%	-1,309	-38.62%	3,389
Mono	2,811	58.55%	1,990	41.45%	821	17.10%	4,801
Monterey	81,287	70.68%	33,720	29.32%	47,567	41.36%	115,007
Napa	37,949	68.49%	17,462	31.51%	20,487	36.97%	55,411
Nevada	30,230	56.80%	22,991	43.20%	7,239	13.60%	53,221
Orange	561,245	52.92%	499,228	47.08%	62,017	5.85%	1,060,473
Placer	80,610	46.71%	91,958	53.29%	-11,348	-6.58%	172,568
Plumas	3,900	43.07%	5,156	56.93%	-1,256	-13.87%	9,056
Riverside	334,939	52.92%	297,988	47.08%	36,951	5.84%	632,927
Sacramento	326,989	64.63%	178,965	35.37%	148,024	29.26%	505,954
San Benito	12,533	62.82%	7,417	37.18%	5,116	25.64%	19,950
San Bernardino	292,192	55.17%	237,398	44.83%	54,794	10.35%	529,590
San Diego	678,633	59.97%	453,055	40.03%	225,578	19.93%	1,131,688
San Francisco	311,559	87.87%	43,021	12.13%	268,538	75.73%	354,580
San Joaquin	111,711	58.40%	79,583	41.60%	32,128	16.80%	191,294
San Luis Obispo	69,324	55.97%	54,536	44.03%	14,788	11.94%	123,860
San Mateo	218,685	78.03%	61,577	21.97%	157,108	56.06%	280,262
Santa Barbara	97,768	64.48%	53,856	35.52%	43,912	28.96%	151,624
Santa Clara	447,306	74.12%	156,164	25.88%	291,142	48.24%	603,470
Santa Cruz	93,218	79.48%	24,068	20.52%	69,150	58.96%	117,286
Shasta	24,173	34.98%	44,938	65.02%	-20,765	-30.05%	69,111
Sierra	698	42.64%	939	57.36%	-241	-14.72%	1,637
Siskiyou	8,072	45.05%	9,846	54.95%	-1,774	-9.90%	17,918
Solano	95,175	65.98%	49,069	34.02%	46,106	31.96%	144,244
Sonoma	156,645	75.65%	50,431	24.35%	106,214	51.29%	207,076
Stanislaus	83,203	54.03%	70,794	45.97%	12,409	8.06%	153,997
Sutter	12,619	43.37%	16,477	56.63%	-3,858	-13.26%	29,096
Tehama	7,085	34.36%	13,533	65.64%	-6,448	-31.27%	20,618
Trinity	2,568	49.20%	2,652	50.80%	-84	-1.61%	5,220
Tulare	46,383	47.11%	52,069	52.89%	-5,686	-5.78%	98,452
Tuolumne	10,281	43.90%	13,138	56.10%	-2,857	-12.20%	23,419
Ventura	177,978	58.63%	125,594	41.37%	52,384	17.26%	303,572
Yolo	52,824	72.33%	20,208	27.67%	32,616	44.66%	73,032
Yuba	7,903	41.82%	10,994	58.18%	-3,091	-16.36%	18,897
Totals	8,013,067	65.45%	4,229,480	34.55%	3,783,587	30.91%	12,242,547

Counties that flipped from Republican to Democratic

- Butte (largest city: Chico)
- Fresno (largest city: Fresno)
- Merced (largest city: Merced)
- Mono (largest city: Mammoth Lakes)
- Nevada (largest city: Truckee)
- Orange (largest city: Anaheim)
- Riverside (largest city: Riverside)
- San Bernardino (largest city: San Bernardino)
- San Diego (largest city: San Diego)
- San Joaquin (largest city: Stockton)
- San Luis Obispo (largest city: San Luis Obispo)
- Stanislaus (largest city: Modesto)
- Ventura (largest city: Oxnard)
