= Lyman King =

American politician

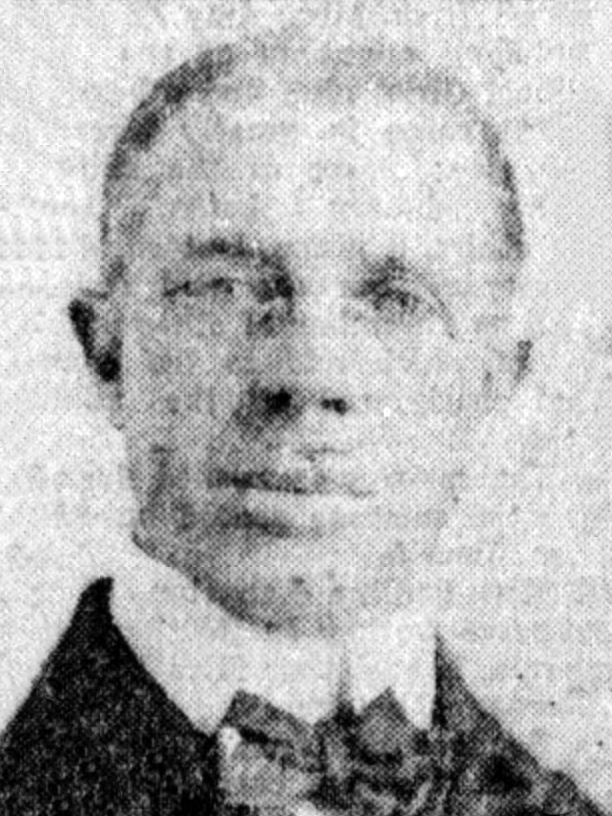
- King in 1926

California Director of Finance
- In office January 31, 1930 – January 5, 1931
- Governor: C. C. Young
- Preceded by: Alexander Heron
- Succeeded by: Rolland Vandegrift

Member of the California Senate from the 30th district
- In office January 4, 1915 – January 8, 1923
- Preceded by: John L. Avey
- Succeeded by: Ralph E. Swing

Personal details
- Born: July 17, 1869 Mount Ayr, Iowa
- Died: July 3, 1950 (aged 80) Loma Linda, California
- Party: Republican
- Education: Napa College
- Occupation: Journalist; Politician; Banker

Lyman Maurice King (July 17, 1869 – July 3, 1950) was an American politician who represented the 30th district in the California State Senate from 1915 to 1923 and the state's Director of Finance from 1930 to 1931.

== Journalism ==
King was born on July 17, 1869, in Mount Ayr, Iowa. He moved to Napa, California at five years old and graduated from Napa College in 1887. He entered the newspaper business as a reporter for the Napa Register. In 1898 he moved to Pasadena to become part owner and city editor of the Pasadena Star-News. In 1904 he moved to Redlands, California, where he purchased the Redlands Daily Review. He later bought the Redlands Daily Facts. He published both papers for a time but eventually sold the Review. In 1929 he sold the Redlands Daily Facts. He also spent nine years as the secretary and treasurer of the Southern California Hospital's board of trustees.

== Politics ==
King was a presidential elector from California in 1908 and a census supervisor during the 1910 United States census. He was elected to the California State Senate in 1914 and reelected in 1918. In 1919 and 1921 he was chairman of the revenue and taxation committee. He was the author of the King Tax Bill, which raised corporate tax rates in California. The bill sparked one of the most bitterly fought legislative battles in the state' history and resulted in heavy newspaper coverage, massive lobbying on both sides, and allegations of bribery. The measure narrowly passed and was signed by Governor William Stephens.

King sought the Republican nomination for Lieutenant Governor of California in 1926. He finished second to Buron Fitts in a three-way primary that also involved Frank Merriam. In 1927, King was appointed to the state Board of Control by governor C. C. Young. The following year, King was appointed chief of the state division of service and supply. From January 31, 1930, to January 5, 1931, King was the state's director of finance. In 1932 he was an unsuccessful candidate for the United States House of Representatives seat in California's 19th congressional district.

== Banking ==
In 1929, King purchased controlling interested in the Redlands Building-Loan Association and assumed the office of president. On March 25, 1937, the association federalized and became known as the Redlands Federal Savings & Loan. King continued as president and manager until 1949, when he was succeeded by his son, Lyman King Jr. King died on July 3, 1950, in Loma Linda, California.
