= Yvonne Walker =

American labor leader (born 1959)

- Born: 1959; Oceanside, California
- Occupations: Union organizer, activist

Yvonne Walker (born 1959) is an American labor union leader and activist. She was president of Service Employees International Union Local 1000, the largest union for California state employees, from 2008 to 2021.

== Early life ==
Yvonne R. Walker was born in 1959 to a military family in Oceanside, California. She served in the Marine Corps before becoming a legal secretary at the California Department of Justice in 1995, where she became involved with union organizing.

== Career ==
Walker's early leadership positions in the Service Employees International Union (SEIU) Local 1000 included chairing the Office & Allied Workers Bargaining Team and serving as Vice President of Bargaining for California. From 2008 to 2021, she served as the president of SEIU Local 1000, the largest union for state employees. She was the first woman and first African American to hold the position. During her tenure, Walker represented over 95,000 workers in California, successfully negotiated a new contract, and worked on proposals to establish a $15 minimum wage.

Walker is an advocate for retirement security and chaired the SEIU International Retirement Security Committee. She was a founding board member of the CalSavers retirement savings program. In 2022, Walker was elected to the board of the California Public Employees' Retirement System (CalPERS). She has also served on the boards of SEIU's International Futures Committee and the California Secure Choice Retirement Investment Program.

In 2016, some SEIU members criticized Walker and other union leaders for voting to give themselves a stipend on top of their salaries during a period of contract negotiation. The stipend more than doubled Walker's SEIU compensation from $49,400 to $108,950. Her supporters said the stipend was commensurate with her role as president of an organization with over 95,000 members and a $60 million budget.

Walker has written op-eds and columns about labor issues and retirement security for The New York Times and the Sacramento News & Review.

== Awards and recognition ==
In 2017, Walker was honored by the National Women's History Alliance for Women's History Month. The theme for the NWHA's awards that year was "trailblazing women in labor and business." She has also been honored by the Coalition of Labor Union Women.

== Bibliography ==
- National Women's History Alliance (2017). "2017 Theme and 2017 Honorees". Archived from the original on April 23, 2026.
- Anderson, Cathie (December 8, 2022). "CalPERS Retirees Elect Longtime SEIU President to Represent Them on Pension Board". The Sacramento Bee. Archived from the original on April 23, 2026.
- Bretón, Marcos (February 18, 2018). "The Supreme Court May Strip This Union Leader of Her Power. Don't Care? Think Again". Sacramento Bee. Archived from the original on October 22, 2020.
- Harvey, Antonio R. (October 25, 2012). "Yvonne Walker Fights for Union Goals". Sacramento Observer.
- Siripurapu, Anshu (August 4, 2016). "Petition Drive to Recall SEIU Local 1000 Officials Nears Deadline". Sacramento Bee. Archived from the original on August 16, 2025.
- Walker, Yvonne (February 26, 2018). "Striking a Blow for the Big Guys". The New York Times. Archived from the original on February 27, 2024.
- Walker, Yvonne (October 9, 2019). "Making Changes, One Bill at a Time". Sacramento News & Review. Archived from the original on February 11, 2026.
