= CSEA =

CSEA may refer to:

- California School Employees Association
- California State Employees Association
- Civil Service Employees Association (AFSCME Local 1000)
- Computer Science and Engineering Association, IIT Guwahati
