= Board of Control =

Board of Control may refer to:

- Board of Control (municipal government), an executive body that usually deals with financial and administrative matters
- Board of Control for Cricket in India
- Board of Control for Cricket in Sri Lanka, now Sri Lanka Cricket
- Board of Control for Lunacy and Mental Deficiency, a body overseeing the treatment of the mentally ill in England and Wales from 1913 to 1946
- British Boxing Board of Control
- California Board of Control, the former state financial oversight agency for California
- Florida Board of Control, a former statewide governing body for the State University System of Florida
- India Board, also known as the Board of Control, that oversaw the activities of the British East India Company
- Ottawa Board of Control, the city of Ottawa's elected executive body from 1908 until 1980
- Toronto Board of Control, the city of Toronto's elected executive body from 1904 until 1969
