= California Legislative Analyst's Office =

California state government agency

Legislative Analyst's Office
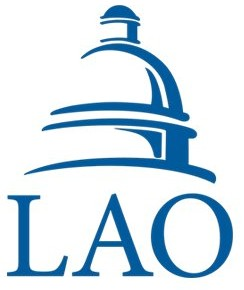

Agency overview
- Formed: 1941; 85 years ago
- Jurisdiction: California State Government
- Headquarters: 925 L Street, Suite 1000, Sacramento, California
- Employees: 56 staff
- Agency executives: Gabriel Petek, Legislative Analyst; Senator Holly J. Mitchell, Chair, Joint Legislative Budget Committee
- Website: lao.ca.gov

The Legislative Analyst's Office (LAO), located in Sacramento, California, is a nonpartisan government agency that has provided fiscal and policy advice to the California Legislature since 1941. Sometimes referred to as the "eyes and ears" of the Legislature, the office is known for analyzing the state budget with the aim of making government programs more effective and less costly.

The LAO was the first such institution in the United States that was designed to help both houses of a legislature manage the state budget in a strictly nonpartisan fashion; it inspired the creation of many similar agencies in other states, as well as the creation of the nonpartisan Congressional Budget Office in 1974. The LAO should not be confused with the California Legislative Counsel (a position established in 1913), which does not focus primarily on the budget.

The LAO is overseen by the Joint Legislative Budget Committee (JLBC), a 16-member bipartisan committee. The office has a staff of 43 analysts and approximately 13 support staff. The analytical staff is divided into four subject areas: Corrections, Environment, and Transportation; State and Local Finance; Education; and Health and Human Services.

The office was founded when the JLBC appointed the first "Legislative Auditor" on October 8, 1941, to assist with the state budgeting process. Because it was frequently confused with the state auditor, the title was changed to "Legislative Analyst" in 1957.

The office has had six Legislative Analysts since its creation. Rolland Vandegrift served from 1941 to 1949, A. Alan Post served from 1949 to 1977, William Hamm served from 1977 to 1986, Elizabeth Hill served from 1986 to 2008, Mac Taylor served from 2008 to 2018, and currently Gabriel Petek serves as legislative analyst.

One of the most important responsibilities of the LAO has been to analyze the annual Governor's budget and publish a detailed review at the end of February. The office has presented a series of analyses from the beginning to the end of the budget process on overarching fiscal issues and specific departmental budget proposals and offered its recommendations for legislative action. In order to provide the Legislature with timely advice on these matters, the LAO has published its budget comments and advice in the form of separate written reports, handouts for hearings, and entries on a Web-based online list, all of which are available at its website. These documents help set the agenda for the work of the Legislature's fiscal committees in developing a state budget. Staff of the office work with these committees throughout the budget process and provide public testimony on the office's recommendations.

More generally, the office is a staff resource to all legislators. The LAO also performs the following functions:

- Budget "Control." The LAO reviews requests by the administration to make changes to the budget after it is enacted. These reviews are used primarily by members of the JLBC and the fiscal committees.
- Special Reports. Throughout the year, the office prepares special reports on the state budget and topics of interest to the Legislature.
- Initiatives and Ballot Measures. The office estimates the fiscal effect on state and local government of all proposed initiatives (prior to circulation) and prepares analyses of all measures that qualify for the statewide ballot.
- Forecasting. The LAO forecasts the state revenues and expenditures.
