= California State University Employees Union =

California State University Employees Union, SEIU Local 2579
- Headquarters: Sacramento, California, USA
- Members: 36,000
- Key people: Catherine Hutchinson, President
- Affiliations: California State Employees Association, Service Employees International Union
- Website: http://www.csueu.org/

The California State University Employees Union (CSUEU)/SEIU 2579 is a labor union representing approximately 36,000 healthcare, operations, administrative and technical support staff and student workers at the California State University's 23 campuses and the Office of the Chancellor. CSUEU represents CSU Bargaining Units 2, 5, 7, 9, 13, 14, 15, and various campus nonprofits is affiliated with the Service Employees International Union and the California State Employees Association.

On February 23, 2024, the California Public Employee Relations Board (PERB) announced that Student Assistants employed at the 23 CSU Campuses and the Chancellor's Office had voted to join CSUEU, establishing CSU bargaining unit 15. Unit 15 includes nearly 20,000 part-time Student Assistants employed by the CSU. This doubled the amount of employees represented by CSUEU, making it the largest labor union in the CSU system. Bargaining Unit 15 has been in negotiations for a first contract since 2024.
