= Russell Gould =

American financier

Russell S. Gould
- Education: University of California, Berkeley
- Occupation: investment banker

Russell S. Gould is an American financier, currently a partner at California Strategies, LLC. He was a member of California Governor Pete Wilson's administration, as Secretary of Health and Human Services (1991 to 1993) and as the Director of Finance (1993 to 1996).

In June 1998, then-California Governor Pete Wilson nominated Gould to serve on the University of California Board of Regents, knowing that his governorship would be coming to a close at the end of the year. The practice was to allow nominees to serve as regents with full voting powers as their nomination awaited confirmation by the California State Senate. In November 1998, Gray Davis was elected to the governorship of California. In January 1999, on his second day in office, Gov. Davis rescinded Gould's nomination and Gould was removed from serving on the Board.

In 2005, Gould was nominated to a 12-year term as University of California regent by Governor Arnold Schwarzenegger and the nomination was subsequently confirmed by the California State Senate.

Gould joined Metropolitan West Securities in 1996; it was taken over by Wachovia in 2006. Gould has been an Executive Vice President at the J. Paul Getty Trust, and was previously chief deputy director of the California Department of Finance (1983 - 1991).
