= California Department of Technology =

American state IT agency

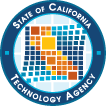

Agency overview
- Formed: January 1, 2007
- Preceding agencies: California Technology Agency; Office of the Chief Information Officer (OCIO)
- Headquarters: 1325 J Street, Suite 1600, Sacramento, California
- Employees: 1104.5 (2025-26)
- Annual budget: $799 million (2025-26)
- Agency executive: Chris Given, Director and State CIO
- Parent agency: California Government Operations Agency
- Website: cdt.ca.gov

The Department of Technology of the state of California, formerly named the California Technology Agency (CTA) is a Department in the Government Operations Agency with statutory authority over information technology (IT) strategic vision and planning, enterprise architecture, policy, and project approval and oversight. As of April 2026, the current director of the department, also known as the chief information officer of the state, is Chris Given.

They operate Calinfo, a peer-to-peer e-Government website for the state's IT employees. It was created by the State of California's IT Manager's Academy, part of the CTA.

== History ==
The Department of Technology Services (DTS) was a department within the California State and Consumer Services Agency established by the Governor's Reorganization Plan No. 2 effective 9 July 2005. The Office of the Chief Information Officer (OCIO) was authorized by S.B. 834 in 2006 (Chapter 533, Statutes of 2006). The Governor reorganized the office with the Governor's Reorganization Plan No. 1 of 2009, which was approved by the Little Hoover Commission and the Legislature, and took effect 10 May 2009. In the reorganization, the office subsumed the Office of Information Security within the Office of Information Security and Privacy Protection, the Department of Technology Services, and the Department of General Services' Telecommunications Division. The office was similarly reorganized as the California Technology Agency and the Secretary of California Technology by A.B. 2408 (Chapter 404, Statutes of 2010) which took effect 1 January 2011.

Under Governor Jerry Brown's government reorganization of 2013, the CTA became the state Department of Technology, and was moved into the Government Operations Agency.

== Organization ==
By law, there is within the department the following offices and officers:

- Office of Technology Services, managed by a Director
- Office of Information Security, managed by a Director
- Public Safety Communications Division, managed by a Director

As well as several others including:

- Assistant Secretary for Geospatial Information Systems (GIO)
- Assistant Secretary for Health Information Systems
