= Chewco =

American company

Chewco Investments L. P. was a limited partnership associated with the Enron scandal, which resulted in the bankruptcy of Enron. It was named after the Star Wars character Chewbacca, and was created to hide losses from its sister company, Joint Energy Development Investment, better known as "JEDI". Like Chewbacca, the Jedi Knights were prominent characters in Star Wars.

Enron created Chewco as a special purpose entity which would help keep the JEDI project off its books. It wanted to buy out the California Public Employees’ Retirement System’s interest in JEDI, but it did not want to be forced, by accepted accounting principles, to consolidate JEDI in the Enron financial statements and thus reflect debt and/or financial losses. Enron wanted to keep JEDI afloat, but it needed a partner to take at least a 3% stake, or the partnership's results would have to be included in Enron's financial statements. Chewco was created to be that partner.

The three basic rules for nonconsolidation of an SPE require that the independent equity investor—

- continuously invest at least 3% of the SPE’s assets;
- exercise control of and assume risks of the SPE; and
- like all other transactions, provide real (potential) economic benefits to Enron.

Chewco appeared to meet these tests, because it was financed by an unsecured loan from Barclays Bank; in reality, however, the loan had been guaranteed by Enron stock held by Enron itself. Additionally, as investors became more wary of Chewco, Michael Kopper, an Enron employee who reported to CFO Andrew Fastow, took over the titular management role and was used to hide actual ownership. With Enron thus assuming practical control over Chewco, the structure did not meet an additional requirement for a non-consolidated SPE. More prosaically, this was one of many ways in which Enron "cooked the books", failing to disclose corporate debt that SEC regulations require to be disclosed.

Over the course of three years, Kopper received between $1.5 and $2 million in management fees from Chewco, some of which was kicked back to Fastow in the form of checks written to members of his family. According to the report of the investigative committee chaired by William Powers Jr., Kopper did little actual work, aside from time spent manipulating the books. Chewco itself did little actual work other than moving funds from one account to another, and that was done with minor expenditure of labor by lower-level employees. After all was said and done, Enron used Chewco to report roughly $400 million in nominal profits, while concealing $600 million in debt.

In November 2001, accountants Arthur Andersen discovered a two-page letter detailing a side deal in which Enron put up cash collateral to ostensibly give Chewco the outside equity it required for SPE status. As part of the deal, JEDI was to make a $6 million distribution to a reserve account in order to secure part of the loan from Barclays. As a result, Barclays no longer had the money at risk. Since Fastow had created Chewco with exactly three percent outside equity, the Barclays loan left Chewco at least $6 million short of the threshold. Upon seeing the proof, Enron treasurer Ben Glisan said, “We're toast.”

Based on these discoveries, Andersen told Bill McLucas of Wilmer, Cutler and Pickering (now WilmerHale), the former SEC enforcement chief who was helping lead the internal investigation into the matter, that Chewco and "everything that touched Chewco"–including JEDI–did not qualify for off-balance sheet treatment. As a result, Chewco and JEDI would have to be retroactively consolidated onto Enron's books, forcing Enron to restate its earnings all the way back to 1997, the date of Chewco's creation. It also emerged that Chewco would not have qualified as an SPE even if it met the equity requirement. Kopper was still employed at Enron at the time he took control of Chewco, and tried to disguise his role by putting his controlling stake in the hand of his domestic partner, Bill Dodson. The ensuing restatement was a primary catalyst for Enron's bankruptcy in December.
