= Issues in retirement security =

Issues in retirement security are growing economic concerns and societal issues over the ability of individual workers and other individuals in society to have an economically secure retirement.

Main issues appear to arise from the general inability of maintaining the economic life-cycle model, that anticipates people to make proper savings during their working lives and eventually exhaust these resources in retirement in order to retain their existing consumption level.

== Variance per country ==
The issues of economic security in retirement pertain to the following concerns.

- Whether individuals are saving enough
- Whether existing government programs for retired individuals are sufficient to support the average person
- Decline in the existence of company-funded pensions for their employees
- Whether workers are contributing enough to company retirement plans
- Whether majority workers have a company retirement plan that they can contribute to

=== United States ===
One of the biggest issue in the current world and also in USA concerning retirement security is the inability to adequately save money for the retirement. Personal saving rate in U.S. is currently near half the level, that was 50 years ago. The rate has increased after the financial crisis in 2009, but still reaches only about 8% of net personal income. Approximately two thirds of Millennials do not save money for retirement at all and half of the American households with someone aged 55 years or more has the same problem. In addition, there is a significant demographic change coming in the next 30 years where the increment of people older than 65 years compared to working age population will be substantially greater. Longevity of the population in the United States is also emerging as a crucial factor for future retirement security, average life expectancy in 2017 of males and females at the age of 65 has increased since 1940 by 6 and 7 years to 84 and 87. This upward trend is expected to rise further.

Millennials (born between 1981 and 1991) are among the most endangered generations. About a one fifth of them are already worried about their retirement security and about a half fear they will not be able to retire when they plan to. According to certain financial experts, they are recommended to save 15 to 22 percent of their income in order to keep their lifestyle standards during retirement period. This figure is double the amount advised to previous generations.

Next problem arising can be the employer-sponsored retirement plans that represent the biggest possibility of retirement income after social security. The NIRS (National Institute for Retirement Security) found out that from the two-thirds of Millennials working for companies and employers offering any type of retirement plan, only half of them (one-third altogether) actually take part. This is caused by the fact that from the two-thirds mentioned only about a half of them are in fact eligible to participate in an employer-sponsored retirement plan, which is far lower proportion compared to previous generations (GenX, Boomers). One of the possible solutions of this particular problem could be shortening of the waiting period for employees to become eligible to reach those plans. Auto-enrollment into the retirement plans for employees with an option to adjust or exit the can also lead to improvement.

Better education, regarding personal finance, retirement savings, pension plans and investing, could represent another way of improving retirement security. Recent OECD's study cites that less than a quarter of working Americans regard themselves to be "knowledgeable investors", furthermore this number can be even lower in reality, because from the OECD's study on financial education emerged, that people often can not fully assess their financial skills and tend to overrate their knowledge in this particular area. Another finding was general impression among people that financial information is very intricate and even difficult to find. Better knowledge and education about financial matters results in more profound awareness of retirement security and can eventually enhance future investment and retirement planning.

== See also ==
- History of retirement
- Economic inequality
- Economic classes
