= CalSTRS =

Pension program of the California Government Operations Agency

Teachers' Retirement Board

Agency overview
- Formed: 1913
- Headquarters: 100 Waterfront Place, West Sacramento, California; 38.584426°N 121.50948°W
- Agency executives: Cassandra Lichnock, CEO; Harry M. Keiley, Chair
- Parent agency: California Government Operations Agency
- Website: CalSTRS.com

The California State Teachers' Retirement System, branded as CalSTRS, provides retirement, disability, and survivor benefits for California's 965,000 prekindergarten through community college educators and their families. CalSTRS was established by law in 1913, and is part of the State of California's Government Operations Agency. As of September 2020, CalSTRS was the largest teachers' retirement fund in the United States. CalSTRS was also the 11th-largest public pension fund in the world. As of June 30, 2025, CalSTRS managed a portfolio worth $367.7 billion.

== Membership ==
CalSTRS members, as of June 30, 2019, included employees of approximately 1,778 employers:

- School districts
- Community college districts
- County offices of education
- Regional occupational programs

== Teachers' Retirement Fund ==
The Teachers' Retirement Fund is a special trust fund established by law that holds the assets of the following programs:

- Defined Benefit
- Defined Benefit Supplement
- Cash Balance Benefit

The assets come from contributions by members, employing school districts, investment earnings and appropriations from the State of California's General Fund. The fund's investments create a stream of income to add to those assets.

The CalSTRS investment portfolio includes stocks, bonds, real estate and short-term investments.

== Finances ==
As of June 30, 2022, CalSTRS managed a portfolio worth approximately $348 billion and held approximately $48 billion of liabilities, leaving a net pension position of $300 billion at that date.

== Governance ==
The Teachers' Retirement Board is responsible for maintaining the Teachers' Retirement Fund in order to pay benefits to CalSTRS members and their survivors.

=== Teachers' Retirement Board ===
The Teachers' Retirement Board sets policies, makes rules for and administers CalSTRS. The Board is also responsible for ensuring benefits are paid by the system in accordance with law.

The 12-member Teachers' Retirement Board is made up of:

- Three member-elected positions representing current educators
- Five members appointed by the Governor of California and confirmed by the California Senate
  - A retired CalSTRS member
  - Three public representatives
  - A school board representative
- Four ex officio members:
  - Director of Finance
  - State Controller
  - State Superintendent of Public Instruction
  - State Treasurer

=== Executive staff ===
In February 2002, the board appointed Jack Ehnes as chief executive officer of CalSTRS to administer the system consistent with the board's policies and rules.

In addition, Christopher J. Ailman served as chief investment officer of CalSTRS since October 2000, directing the system’s investments in accordance with Teachers’ Retirement Board policy. He stepped down in 2024.

In June 2021, Ehnes retired from the position, and chief operating officer Cassandra Lichnock filled the position.

=== Advisory committees ===
Two advisory committees meet regularly to provide forums for active participation in the formation of CalSTRS policies and procedures. The Employer Advisory Committee is composed of county and district employer representatives and CalSTRS staff and meets quarterly, and the Client Advisory Committee includes CalSTRS staff and members from various organizations representing CalSTRS members and benefit recipients and meets regularly coinciding with Board meeting dates.

== Operations ==
Like other large pension plans, CalSTRS had previously announced its proxy-vote intentions on selective companies. The addition of online disclosure opens the process to all CalSTRS portfolio companies, allowing other shareholders to know how the pension fund will vote.

As of May 2009, CalSTRS held stock in over 3,800 North American companies.

== Shareholder activism ==
After the December 14, 2012 Sandy Hook Elementary School shooting, California's treasurer, Bill Lockyer, considered ordering CalSTRS to eliminate investments in gun manufacturers. On January 9, 2013, the Teachers' Retirement Board Investment Committee directed staff to "begin the process of divestment from firearm companies that manufacture weapons that are illegal in California", and CalSTRS divested from Sturm Ruger and the American Outdoor Brands Corporation, (formerly Smith & Wesson).

In January 2018, CalSTRS issued a public letter to Apple Inc. alongside JANA Partners, LLC called "Think Differently About Kids". The letter encouraged Apple to find new ways to limit the effects of smartphone use on children.

CalSTRS is among the signatories of the "Principles for a Responsible Civilian Firearms Industry", which seeks to engage firearms manufacturers, dealers, and retailers in promoting gun safety.

Since the mid-2010s, activists have increasingly called for CalSTRS to cut financial ties with fossil fuel companies. In 2015, Kevin de León introduced CalSTRS and CalPERS coal divestment legislation and the California Democratic Party passed a resolution in support of fossil fuel divestment. Kevin de León's bill passed and CalSTRS was required to sell all holdings in companies that received at least 50% of their revenue from thermal coal. State Senator Lena Gonzalez introduced broader fossil fuel divestment legislation in February 2022. The CalSTRS board opposed this legislation. It passed the California State Senate but was halted in the assembly by Jim Cooper. As of 2022, CalSTRS has about $4.1 billion invested in oil and gas companies.

== Headquarters ==
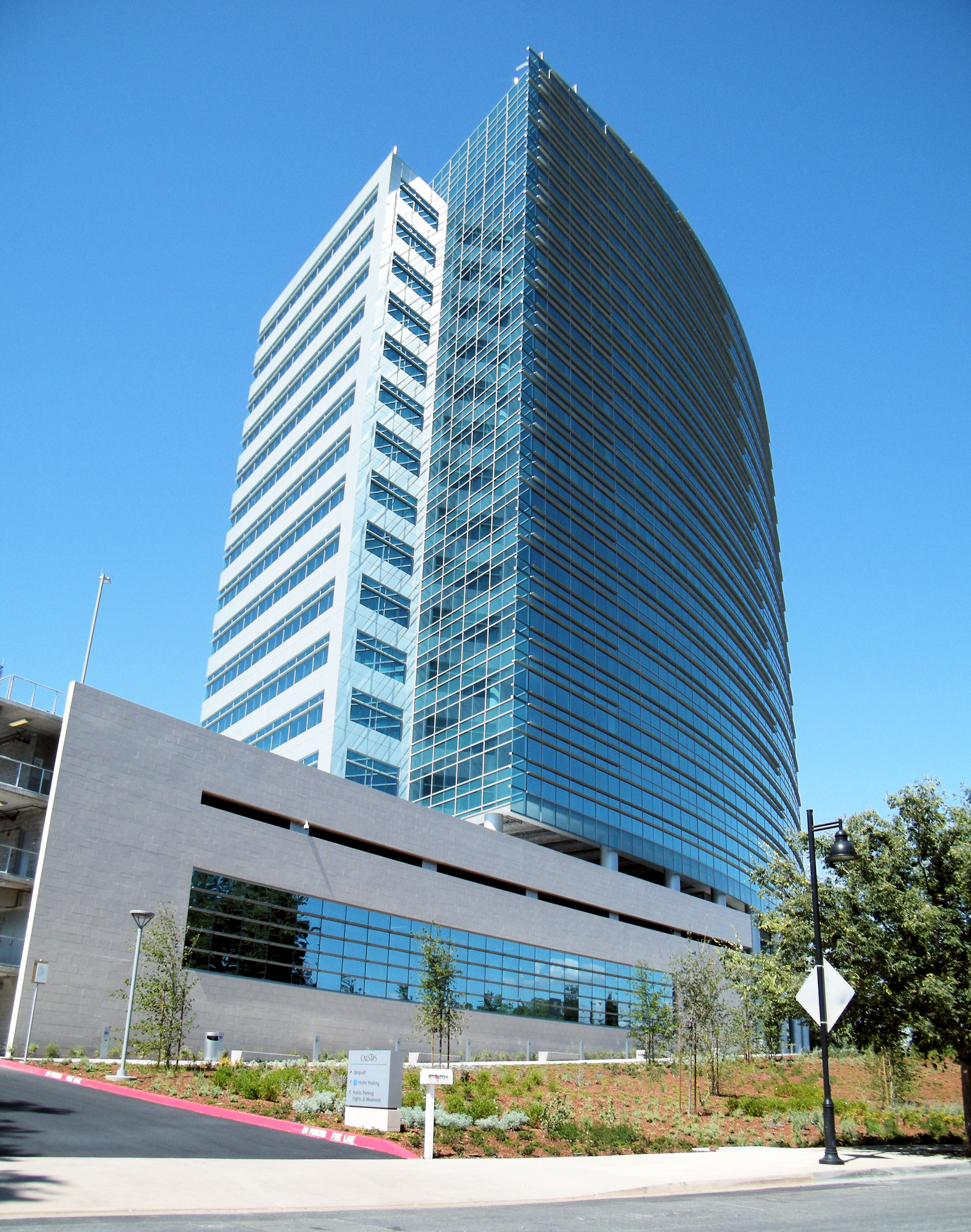
CalSTRS headquarters in West Sacramento, California

The CalSTRS headquarters building in West Sacramento opened in June 2009 and is designed to serve members through 2049. It was built to address membership growth, changing retirement needs, and goals for greater efficiency and sustainability. The building cost $266 million and is a 13-story office tower above two levels of public space. It is part of the Sacramento Riverfront Master Plan.

The CalSTRS headquarters was designed to meet LEED Gold standards and includes several sustainability features. These include water-efficient systems, recycled construction materials, locally sourced materials, and building design that maximizes natural light. In October 2011, the building received LEED Platinum certification for Existing Buildings: Operations and Maintenance.

== See also ==
- California Public Employees' Retirement System (CalPERS)
- California State Controller
- California State Treasurer
- Defined benefit pension plan
