= A. Alan Post =

American legislative analyst

August Alan Post (September 17, 1914 – March 26, 2011) worked for 28 years (1949–1977) as California's legislative analyst.

== Early life and education ==
Post was born on September 17, 1914, in Alhambra in Los Angeles County, California, the second of four children of developer Edwin Post and teacher Edna. The family initially grew up in South Pasadena and moved to Lancaster during the Great Depression.

Post received his undergraduate education at Occidental College in economics and art, earning his degrees in 1938. He also learned painting from the Chouinard Institute of the Arts in Los Angeles, California. He started work on his Ph.D. in economics at Princeton University but left before completing, to go teach economics at Occidental College. While at Princeton, he also married Helen Wills, a painter, and sculptor, and sold his first painting.

== Career ==
=== Till 1949 ===
Post served in the U.S. Navy in World War II, from 1943 to 1944.

Post briefly worked for the State Department and in Utah, and in 1946 arrived in Sacramento, California to work as the chief economic and administrative analyst for the legislature's joint budget committee.

=== California's Legislative Analyst (1949–1977) ===
In 1949, after the then legislative auditor Rolland Vandegrift died, he became acting legislative auditor, heading California Legislative Analyst's Office. The role name was later changed to "legislative analyst".

Post's work as legislative analyst largely involved providing recommendations about the state budget, and he was supposed to perform his role in an independent, nonpartisan, fact-driven manner. Post's work was praised by a number of politicians whose tenure overlapped with his, including Jerry Brown (California Governor) and Willie Brown (San Francisco Mayor) although he also had conflicts with some politicians, including California Governor Ronald Reagan.

Although primarily focused on the budget, Post also dealt with a number of other issues. For instance, in 1972, after controversy arose over the safety of the Bay Area Rapid Transit, he commenced an investigation, hiring Bill Wattenburg as a consultant (see history of Bay Area Rapid Transit#Train-control failures for more information).

In 1974, Post was interviewed for the Earl Warren Oral History Project.

In 1977, Post retired from his job, and was succeeded by William G. Hamm.

=== Later life ===
After retirement from the Legislative Analyst's Office, Post continued to serve in various capacities on state commissions. In 1992, he wrote a report critical of executive compensation in the University of California system.

Post was one of the founding directors of the Public Policy Institute of California, that was founded in 1994.

== Awards and recognition ==
In 2000, the California Journal named Post one of California's 30 most influential public figures of the 20th century, along with Ronald Reagan, Hiram Johnson, Pat Brown, Jerry Brown, and others.

In 2007, Post received the League of California Cities Past Presidents’ Lifetime Achievement Award during the closing session of the league's annual conference in Sacramento.

== Death ==
Post died in Sacramento, California, on March 26, 2011, at age 96. He was pre-deceased by his wife Helen, who had died in 2010.
