= Rolland Vandegrift =

American government official (1893–1949)

Rolland A. Vandegrift (November 19, 1893 – December 17, 1949) was an American government official who served as California's director of finance (1931–1934) and legislative auditor (1941–1949).

== Early life ==
Vandegrift was born on November 19, 1893, in Washington, Pennsylvania. He graduated from Chico Senior High School in earned a B.A. from the University of California, Berkeley in 1917 and a M.A. from the same school in 1920. He also received a fellowship sponsored by the Native Sons of the Golden West which allowed him to perform archival research on the history of California in Spain, England, and France. During World War I, Vandegrift served in the United States Army.

== Career ==
From 1920 to 1921 and from 1922 to 1923, Vandegrift was an assistant in history at the University of California. From 1923 to 1926, he was an assistant professor of history and government at the University of Southern California. He then served as director of research for the California Taxpayers Association and in 1929 became the organization's secretary manager. In 1928, he founded Vandegrift Research Associates, which conducted governmental research in the California, Nevada, Arizona, and Utah. From January 6, 1931, to August 30, 1934, Vandegrift was the director of finance for the state of California. In 1935 he joined Occidental Life Insurance Company as a general agent and branch manager. In 1941, Vandegrift returned to state government as California's first Legislative Auditor. On December 17, 1949, Vandegrift died at Sutter Hospital in Sacramento, California, from complications from an abdominal operation.

Political offices
Preceded by Lyman King	California Director of Finance; 1931–1934	Succeeded by Arlin Stockburger
Preceded by Position created	Legislative Auditor of California; 1941–1949	Succeeded by A. Alan Post
