= Mona Pasquil =

47th Lieutenant Governor of California

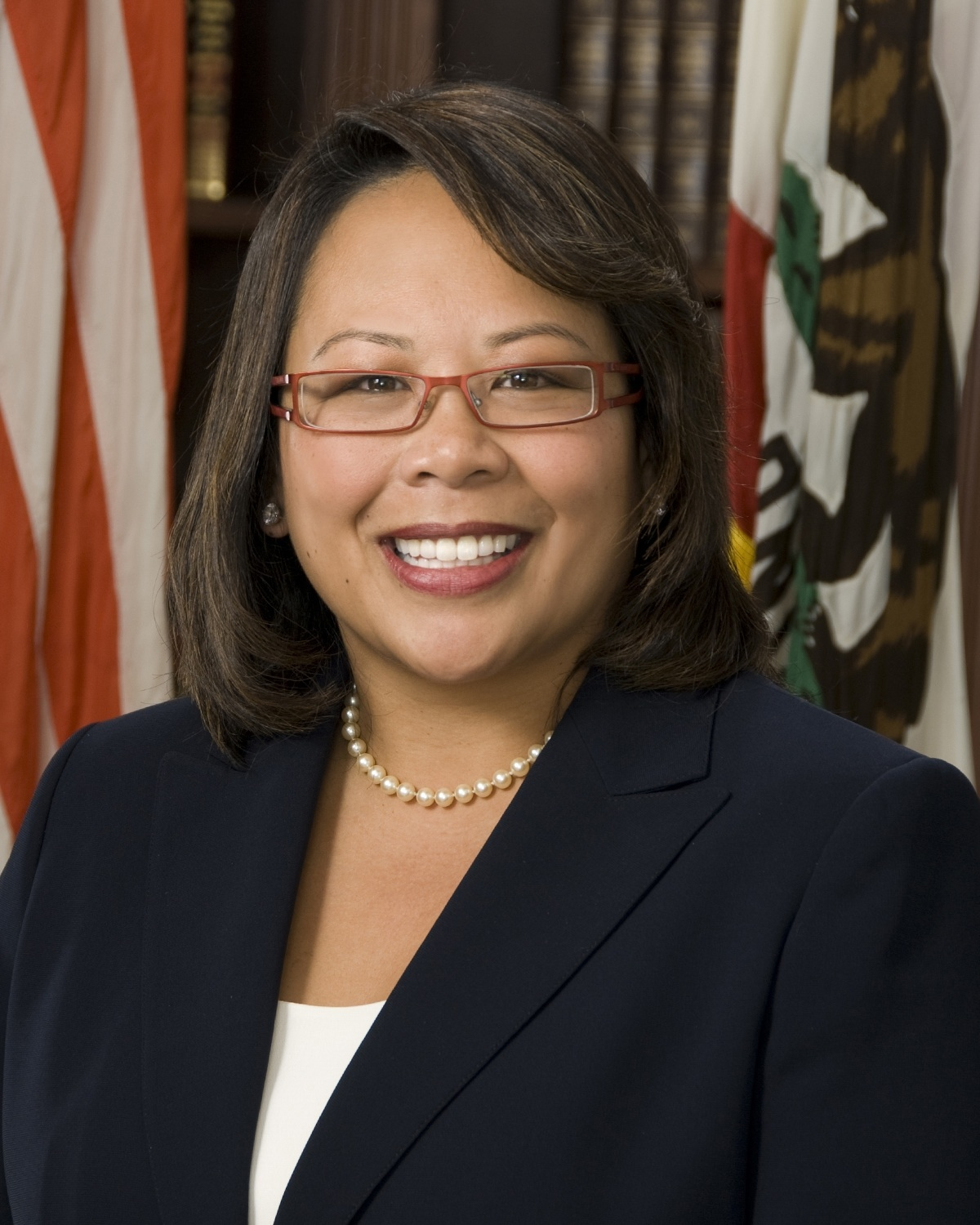
- Official portrait, 2009

47th Lieutenant Governor of California
- Acting; November 4, 2009 – April 27, 2010
- Governor: Arnold Schwarzenegger
- Preceded by: John Garamendi
- Succeeded by: Abel Maldonado

Personal details
- Born: Simeona Fortunata Pasquil; April 3, 1962 (age 63) Sacramento County, California, U.S.
- Political party: Democratic
- Education: Marymount College (BA)

Mona Pasquil Rogers (born Simeona Fortunata Pasquil; April 3, 1962) is an American politician who served as the 47th and acting lieutenant governor of California from November 4, 2009 to April 27, 2010. Upon taking office, Pasquil Rogers became the first woman, Filipina, and person of Pacific Islander heritage to hold the role.

During her career, Pasquil Rogers has served in a variety of political roles, including as political director of John Kerry 2004 presidential campaign, and as appointments secretary under governor Jerry Brown.

In 2019, Pasquil Rogers was hired by Facebook as head of public policy for California. Pasquil Rogers was appointed to the California State Personnel Board in 2019, and in 2021 was elected to serve as the board's vice president.

== Early life and education ==
Pasquil was born and raised in a Filipino family in Sacramento County, California. Her father was a career social worker. When Pasquil was 12, she babysat for John Garamendi and his wife Patricia; Garamendi would later employ Pasquil in the office of the lieutenant governor. She earned a Bachelor of Arts degree in English from Marymount College in Salina, Kansas.

== Career ==
Pasquil was the political director of the John Kerry 2004 presidential campaign. In the 2008 U.S. Presidential election, she served as a superdelegate supporting Hillary Clinton. In January 2011, California governor Jerry Brown named her appointments secretary.

=== Lieutenant governor of California ===
On November 3, 2009, California Lieutenant Governor John Garamendi was elected to the United States House of Representatives for California's 10th congressional district, leaving the office of lieutenant governor vacant. On November 4, 2009, California Governor Arnold Schwarzenegger appointed Pasquil, Garamendi's chief of staff, as acting lieutenant governor pending the confirmation of Abel Maldonado.

Upon Pasquil's appointment, she became California's first Asian lieutenant governor; its first Filipino lieutenant governor; its first female lieutenant governor; and the first California acting lieutenant governor not to succeed to the position from the president pro tempore of the California State Senate.

=== Later career ===
Pasquil Rogers went on to serve as California's Office of Emergency Services as a senior advisor. In 2019, Pasquil Rogers was hired as head of California public policy by Facebook. Pasquil Rogers was appointed to the California State Personnel Board in 2019, and was elected to serve as vice president for 2021.

== See also ==
- List of female lieutenant governors in the United States
- List of minority governors and lieutenant governors in the United States

Political offices
Preceded by John Garamendi; Lieutenant Governor	Lieutenant Governor of California; Acting; 2009-2010	Succeeded by Abel Maldonado; Lieutenant Governor
