= CalPERS =

California government agency which manages pensions for government workers

Board of Administration of the Public Employees' Retirement System

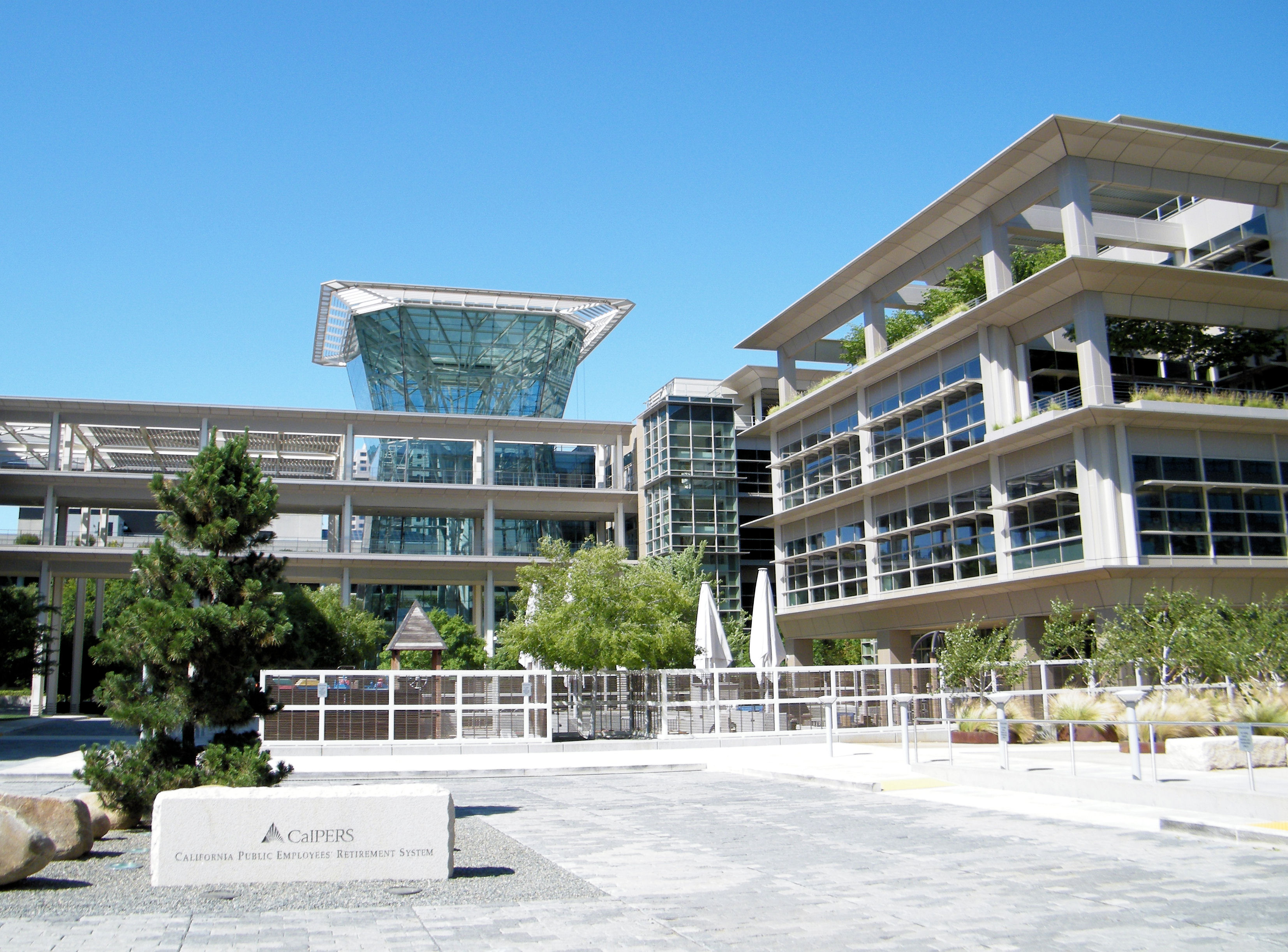
- Headquarters at Lincoln Plaza in Sacramento

Agency overview
- Formed: 1932; 94 years ago
- Headquarters: Sacramento, California; 38.575°N 121.505°W
- Employees: 2,843 (2024)
- Annual budget: US$2.44 billion (2024)
- Agency executives: Marcie Frost, CEO; Henry Jones, Board President; Theresa Taylor, Board Vice President
- Website: calpers.ca.gov

The California Public Employees' Retirement System, branded as CalPERS, is an agency in the California executive branch that "manages pension and health benefits for more than 1.5 million California public employees, retirees, and their families". In fiscal year 2020–21, CalPERS paid over $27.4 billion in retirement benefits, and over $9.74 billion in health benefits.

CalPERS manages the largest public pension fund in the United States, with more than $469 billion in assets under management as of June 30, 2021. CalPERS is known for its shareholder activism; stocks placed on its "Focus List" may perform better than other stocks, which has given rise to the term "CalPERS effect". Outside the U.S., CalPERS has been called "a recognized global leader in the investment industry", and "one of America's most powerful shareholder bodies".

As of 2018, the agency has $360 billion in assets, and is underfunded by an estimated $150 billion, with current assets below 70% of necessary to provide for liabilities. In an effort to reduce this shortfall, at the end of 2016 the board lowered their expected annual rate of return on investments from 7.5% to 7.0%, increasing the costs California cities must pay toward their workers' pensions.

== Statistics on pension payouts, 2018 ==
- Total payout = $22 billion
- Total beneficiaries = 600,000
- Overall average = $32,224 - (including payments to survivors and workers with only a few years of service)
- 20+ years of service average = $50,333
- 30+ years of service average = $66,373
- Police or Firefighters with 20+ years of service average = $78,104
- Number of retirees with $100,000+ pension = 26,000 (This is 4% of the total number of retirees, yet this group collected 17% of the total amount CalPERS paid out in 2018.)

For comparison:

- Average Social Security payout = $17,532

== History ==
Discussion about providing for the retirement of California state employees began in 1921, but only in 1930 did California voters approve an amendment to the State Constitution to allow pensions to be paid to state workers, and only in 1931 was state law passed to establish a state worker retirement plan. In 1932, the "State Employees' Retirement System" (SERS) began operation. The California State Employees Association, established in 1931, began a close relationship with SERS that continues to this day.

In 1939, the state Legislature passed a bill that allowed local public agencies (such as cities, counties, and school districts) to participate in SERS. Initially, SERS could invest only in bonds, but in 1953 a new state law allowed SERS to invest in real estate. SERS then built a 670,000-square-foot (62,000 m^{2}), 16-story building in Sacramento which opened in 1965; part of the building housed SERS employees, and part of the building was leased to other state agencies.

The "first major new benefit for SERS members," health insurance, began in 1962 with the passage of a law that was later amended to become the "Public Employees' Medical and Hospital Care Act". Because by 1967 SERS was contracting with 585 local public agencies for retirement benefits, its name was changed to the "Public Employees' Retirement System" (PERS). With the passage of a ballot proposition and a state law in 1966–1967, PERS was allowed to invest 25% of its portfolio in stocks; in 1984, Proposition 21 removed the 25% limitation.

State Treasurer Jesse M. Unruh was a PERS Board member in the mid-1980s. He began PERS' emphasis on corporate governance; in addition, he was instrumental in creating the Council of Institutional Investors, an organization of pension funds and other institutions that opposed "greenmail and other corporate practices that benefited only management".

In 1986, the headquarters building of PERS, now called "Lincoln Plaza North", was completed in Sacramento at a cost of $81 million. The building, which has 492,900 square feet (45,790 m^{2}), is known for its six-story-high atrium and landscaped terraces.

=== Governor Pete Wilson ===
In 1990, fund value reached $49.8 billion. In July 1991, Governor Pete Wilson addressed the state's $14.3 billion budget deficit by removing $1.6 billion from the pension fund. Wilson further sought to give the governor's office control of the PERS’ actuarial projections and the appointment of a majority of its board of directors. Public employee unions responded by seeking an amendment to the Constitution of California that would guarantee the board's independence, remove the fund's duty to minimize contributions or administrative costs, and require the provision of benefits to "take precedence over any other duty". The initiative, known as Proposition 162, passed by a single percent at the November California elections, 1992. Proposition 162, also known as the "California Pension Protection Act of 1992," gave the PERS board "the sole and exclusive fiduciary responsibility over the assets of" PERS.

To avoid confusion with public employees' retirement systems in other states, the organization's name was changed to "CalPERS" in 1992. By 1996, the CalPERS portfolio was worth $100 billion, and the number of members exceeded 1 million.

=== Governor Gray Davis ===
In 1999, fund value reached $159.1 billion, requiring $159 million in state tax dollar contributions. In 1999, the CalPERS board proposed a benefits expansion that would allow public employees to retire at age 55 and collect more than half their highest salary for life. CalPERS predicted the benefits would require no increase in the State's contributions by projecting an average annual return of 8.25% over the next decade. When Board member Phil Angelides’ aide questioned whether the stock market could grow that long, Board Chairman William Crist, a former union president, replied that they "could make all sorts of different assumptions and make predictions, but that’s really more than I think we can expect our staff to do". CalPERS' chief actuary, objected, finding that it would be "fairly catastrophic" if the fund only grew at 4.4%.

The benefits expansion bill, SB 400, passed with unanimous backing by California State Assembly Democrats and was signed into law by Governor Gray Davis. CalPERS then produced a video promoting the legislation with Chairman Crist promising greater benefits "without imposing any additional cost on the taxpayers" and the California State Employees Association president praising it as "the biggest thing since sliced bread".

The next year the dot-com bubble burst, and CalPERS did not grow, instead losing value in the stock market downturn of 2002. In 2001–2002, CalPERS provided technical assistance for the Sarbanes-Oxley Act because it had sustained financial losses from the Enron and WorldCom bankruptcies. After the Great Recession, in 2009 CalPERS investments lost 24%, dropping $67 billion in value. Chairman Crist retired from the board and it was later revealed he had accepted more than $800,000 from a firm to ensure hundreds of millions of investment from CalPERS.

In November 2005, CalPERS expanded its headquarters with the 560,000-square-foot (52,000 m^{2}) "Lincoln Plaza East & West" buildings which cost $265 million. The architecture of the buildings, which received praise, was designed by architecture studio Pickard Chilton and includes an entry tower 90 feet (27 m) high in a shape reminiscent of a tree which is made of steel covered with glass. The project was awarded a Gold Leadership in Energy and Environmental Design (LEED) rating.

=== Governor Jerry Brown ===
In 2012, Governor Jerry Brown signed legislation that reduced benefits for all new state employees and sought to combat pension spiking. Legislators rejected Governor Brown's proposals to include a 401(k) type defined contribution plan and to require CalPERS Board members to be independent, not themselves pensioners. Governor Brown promoted the reform as the "biggest rollback to public pension benefits in the history of California", but it only resulted in a 1% to 5% reduction in contribution increases. Total savings from the reform are estimated to be $28 to $38 billion.

In the fall of 2014, CalPERS named Ted Eliopoulos as chief investment officer. He won the #2 ranking in the Public Investor 100 for 2016. Blackstone Group LP announced in November 2015 that it would acquire 43 international and domestic real estate funds from CalPERS for $3 billion.

In 2015, Kevin de León, who was the California State Senate majority leader at the time, introduced legislation to require CalPERS and CalSTRS divest from coal and the California Democratic Party passed a resolution in support of fossil fuel divestment. The bill was passed and, effective June 1, 2017, CalPERS was prohibited from maintaining holdings in companies that receive at least half of their revenue from thermal coal.

In 2016, CalPERS fund value reached $295.1 billion. State tax dollar contributions have had to increase to $45 billion, a 3,000% increase from before the 1999 benefits expansion. Promised benefits exceeded funds available by $241.3 billion. Unfunded retiree healthcare costs add an additional $125 billion to California's public retirement debt.

=== Governor Gavin Newsom ===
During Gavin Newsom's tenure, activists have increasingly called for CalPERS to more broadly divest from fossil fuels. On February 17, 2022, State Senator Lena Gonzalez introduced legislation that would require CalPERS and CalSTRS divest. The CalPERS board has opposed proposals to divest. The bill passed the state senate on May 25 but was halted in the assembly by Jim Cooper.

== Governance ==
=== Law ===
The legal authority for the activities of CalPERS can be found in the constitution, laws, and regulations of the state of California, including:

- California Constitution, Article XVI, Section 17, under which (as amended by Proposition 162) "the retirement board of a public pension or retirement system shall have plenary authority and fiduciary responsibility for investment of moneys and administration of the system".
- California Government Code, Title 2, Division 5, Parts 3-8 (i.e., Sections 20000–22970.89). Among other parts, Part 3 covers the administration of the retirement system including membership, contributions, and benefits; and Part 5 covers the Public Employees' Medical and Hospital Care Act on health benefits.
- California Code of Regulations, Title 2, Division 1, Chapter 2, Sections 550–559.554.

=== Board of Administration ===
CalPERS is overseen by a 13-member Board of Administration whose members are elected, appointed, or ex officio:

- Six are elected from CalPERS members (two by all CalPERS members, one by active State members, one by active CalPERS school members, one by active CalPERS public agency members, and one by retired members of CalPERS)
- Three are appointed (two by the Governor, one by specified leaders of the Legislature)
- Four are ex officio (California State Treasurer, California State Controller, Director of the California Department of Human Resources, and designee of the California State Personnel Board)

Notable past Board members have included Caspar Weinberger (1967–1969), Jesse Unruh (1983–1987), Gray Davis (1986–1994), Matt Fong (1995–1998), Kathleen Connell (1995–2003), Phil Angelides (1999–2006), Willie Brown (2000–2005), and Steve Westly (2003–2006).

As of 2026, the current Board members are Theresa Taylor (president), David Miller, Malia M. Cohen, Michael Detoy, Monica Erickson, Troy Johnson, Fiona Ma, Lisa Middleton, Kevin Palkki, Ramon Rubalcava, Yvonne Walker, Mullissa Willette, and Gail Willis.

==== Controversies ====
Between 1999 and 2001, several conflicts among Board members were notable:

- In 1999, after Board member Phil Angelides (also state treasurer) criticized a statement in a report, Board chairman Charles Valdes said about Angelides "What we have here is a Greek treasurer who doesn't like Turkey, the country; who doesn't like Turks, who is trying to … drive our policy according to those ethnic hatreds". Angelides responded that he was "do[ing] what is best for the state". Valdes later apologized for the remarks.
- Board member Kathleen Connell (also state controller) sued CalPERS in January 2001 to limit its investment managers' pay. Although CalPERS argued that the higher salaries were necessary to compete for qualified investment managers and that CalPERS had the authority under Proposition 162 to issue the higher salaries, it lost the lawsuit, which "helped prompt the fund's chief investment officer to quit".
- Valdes endorsed a lawsuit against the Board's proposal to change its election procedures to require a majority vote (not simply a plurality vote) for Board seats chosen by CalPERS members.

In response to such conflicts, the Board took various measures (e.g., it adopted a "document of collegiality" in October 2001).

Other controversies have affected the Board, such as:

- In 1998, it was discovered that several Board members were "taking expense-paid trips and other gifts from people trying to do business with" CalPERS.
- Articles in 2002–03 issues of BusinessWeek and The Wall Street Journal noted cronyism and conflicts of interest among Board members.
- A president of the Board, Sean Harrigan, was removed from his position in December 2004 amid criticism for his activism on matters of corporate governance. He claimed his removal was politically motivated.
- In September 2014, California's State controller, John Chiang criticized the fund for "passive" approach towards pension spiking - a practice of inflating workers' benefits just before retirement in order to boost their pensions- and failing to adequately review payroll data, inviting abuse.

=== Executives ===
CalPERS employees perform under the direction of the chief executive officer (CEO) of CalPERS. Past CEOs have been: Earl W. Chapman (1932–1956); Edward K. Coombs (acting, 1956); William E. Payne (1956–1974); Carl J. Blechinger (1975–1983); Sidney C. McCausland (1984–1986); Kenneth G. Thomason (acting or interim, 1987); Dale M. Hanson (1987–1994); Richard H. Koppes (interim, 1994); James E. Burton (1994–2002); Robert D. Walton (interim, 2002); Fred R. Buenrostro, Jr. (2002–2008); Kenneth W. Marzion (interim, 2008–2009); Anne Stausboll (2009–June 2016); and Marcie Frost (October 2016 – Present).

Reporting to the CEO, the executive officers of CalPERS are: deputy executive officers for customer services and support, health benefit programs, policy and planning, operations and technology, and external affairs; a general counsel; a chief actuary; and a chief financial officer; a chief information officer; a chief risk officer; and a chief investment officer. Under the executive officers, CalPERS employees work in 23 major branches, divisions, and offices. Approximately $415.1 million is budgeted in 2014-2015 for administrative functions in CalPERS, such as paying the salaries of 2,700 CalPERS employees.

== Operations ==
=== Investment income gains and losses 1999-2021 ===
CalPERS current fund balance value as of June 2021 is 466.66 Billion.

CalPERS derives its income from investments, from member contributions, and from employer contributions.

Investment Income has fluctuated in the last 15 years, 1999–2013, with five years of losses and 10 years of gains. There were investment income gains of $17 billion in 1999, $16 billion in 2000 and $5 billion in 2003. The stock market declines in 2001 led to investment income losses of 12 billion in 2001 and 10 billion in 2002. Thus, the five-year period 1999 to 2003 period had a cumulative income of $16 billion, or about three billion a year on an investment portfolio of over $200 billion.

The next four years were a period of investment income stability; a 24 billion investment income in 2004, 22 billion in 2005, 21 billion in 2006, and 41 billion in 2007. This four-year period had a cumulative investment income of $108 billion, or $27 billion a year.

With the stock market decline during the 2008 financial crisis, there were large investment income losses. There was a 12 billion dollar investment income loss in 2008 and 55 billion in 2009.

The 124 billion dollars of income in the nine-year period 1999-2007 was reduced by half as a consequence of the combined losses of 67 billion in 2008 and 2009. This totals to 57 billion dollars of investment income during this 11-year period, or about 5.1 billion a year on an investment portfolio of 261 billion in October 2007 and down to 186 billion in October 2008. This is a 2.5% return on investment over the 11-year period.

Income or loss from investments fluctuates from year to year; between 1998–99 and 2007–08, the highest income was $40.7 billion in 2006-07 and the greatest loss was $12.5 billion in 2007–08. As of October 2008, CalPERS had a total of $186.7 billion in assets invested as follows: $104.9 billion (56.2%) in equities, $41.0 billion (21.9%) in fixed income, $20.9 billion (11.2%) in real estate, $16.2 billion (8.7%) in cash equivalents, and $3.7 billion (2.0%) in inflation linked assets.

In 2010 CalPERS revised its strategic asset allocation mix using its Asset Liability Management process. By the end of the fiscal year ended June 30, 2013, CalPERS had a total of $257.9 billion in assets invested as follows: $166.3 billion (64 percent) in equities, $40.2 billion (16 percent) in fixed income, $25.8 billion (10 percent) in real assets, $10.6 billion (4 percent) in cash equivalents, $9.2 billion (4 percent) in inflation-linked assets, $5.2 billion (2 percent) in hedge funds, and $0.5 billion (0.0 percent) in multi-asset class and other.

=== Shareholder activism ===
Beginning in the 1980s, and especially in the early 1990s under the pioneering leadership of CEO Dale Hanson, CalPERS has used its influence as one of the largest shareholders in the world to change the way certain things are done in business. It is especially known for its shareholder activism concerning corporate governance, in which it has been described as the most influential pension fund and as "a leader among activist institutions".

Among other examples of its shareholder activism, CalPERS has:

- Lobbied the board of General Motors (GM) "to take a more active role in monitoring the company, which may have been a factor in the GM board's ousting chairman Robert Stempel in 1992.
- Demanded in 1999 that U.S. companies in its portfolio disclose their Year 2000 problem readiness.
- Starting in 2000, "screen[ed] all its investments in emerging markets for compliance with a number of human rights, environmental and labor standards".
- As of 2002, called on companies which operate in offshore havens to repatriate to the United States.
- With other pension funds, on September 16, 2003, called upon Richard Grasso to resign from the NYSE because of an exorbitant pay package; he resigned the next day.
- In 2003, sued the NYSE and seven specialist firms over allegations that the firms' floor workers engage in practices which hurt investors. The firms "settled with the Securities and Exchange Commission in 2005 and paid more than $240 million in fines without admitting or denying guilt". The part of CalPERS' lawsuit aimed at the NYSE itself was later thrown out of court, and in 2008 the U.S. Supreme Court declined to reinstate that part of the lawsuit.
- Called for reform in executive compensation, especially golden parachutes, in 2004.
- In 2004, with other parties, opposed Michael Eisner as chairman of the board and CEO of The Walt Disney Company; Eisner was removed as chairman of the board and in 2005 resigned as CEO.
- In 2006, banned investment of its funds in nine companies that do business in Sudan until the government of that country halts ongoing genocide; however, that decision was described as "a largely symbolic gesture" because CalPERS "did not own a stake in any of the nine".
- From September 2006 through July, participated as lead plaintiff in a successful class-action lawsuit against UnitedHealth Group for options backdating. CalPERS had held "6.6 million shares of UnitedHealth stock valued at $360 million". In August 2009, a federal judge in Minnesota ordered UnitedHealth to pay $895 million to settle the lawsuit; furthermore, former UnitedHealth CEO William W. McGuire would pay $30 million and relinquish options to buy 3.68 million UnitedHealth shares; another former executive would pay $500,000.
- With other institutional investors, requested in 2007 that the government "set national, mandatory standards to cut greenhouse gas emissions".
- At Apple in 2013, CalPERS voted for a management proposal to implement majority voting for director elections and other proposals designed to enhance shareowner rights. This was a result of more than two years of engagement with Apple to change its voting standard for board candidates from a plurality model to a majority standard. Following successful CalPERS-sponsored shareowner resolutions supporting majority voting, in February 2013 Apple sponsored Proposal 2, which would amend Apple's charter to provide for majority voting for directors. The proposal would also establish a par value for Apple stock and eliminate Apple's ability to issue preferred shares without shareholder approval. CalPERS strongly supported Apple's position that preferred stock should not be issued without shareowner approval. While the 2013 vote was canceled on a technicality, majority voting was officially adopted in 2014.
- At Nabors Industries in 2013 CalPERS sponsored a proposal to amend the company's by-laws to require shareowner approval of severance benefits that exceed 2.99 times the sum of an executive's base salary and bonus. CalPERS also voted for a proposal asking the board to elect an independent chair and for a proposal allowing shareowners to nominate candidates for election to the board.
- CalPERS is among the signatories of the "Principles for a Responsible Civilian Firearms Industry," which seeks to engage firearms manufacturers, dealers, and retailers in promoting gun safety.

CalPERS has received some criticism for its shareholder activism:

- As of 2002, there was a concern that CalPERS' activism had distracted from "its effectiveness as a corporate watchdog and its ability to provide for the 1.3 million public employees whose pensions it guarantees".
- Despite the efforts of CalPERS and others, the chief counsel of TIAA-CREF was quoted in 2003 as saying that there has been "no countrywide improvement in corporate governance".
- CalPERS votes against some companies' directors "whose sins are exceedingly small," such as "attendance gaps or minor conflicts".
- Businesses describe CalPERS as having a "pro-labor agenda", especially because of the dominance of Democrats on CalPERS' board.
- Some argue that CalPERS' actions unduly interfere with business and encourage the belief that California is "anti-business".

=== The Focus List and the "CalPERS effect" ===
Beginning in 1987, CalPERS placed certain companies, with which it had "concerns about stock and financial underperformance and corporate governance practices" on a "Focus List". The list was also referred to as a "name and shame" list. Beginning in 2010, CalPERS stopped publicly naming companies on the list and instead began dealing with such companies privately. In 2012, CalPERS initiated a program to monetize the Focus List. Each year, after the Board approves staff recommendations for Focus List companies, CalPERS increases investments in those companies. New Focus List companies are added to the portfolio each year, and the portfolio is rebalanced so that holdings remain equally weighted. The purpose of monetizing the Focus List is to replicate the Wilshire studies—using actual funds to demonstrate and measure the "CalPERS Effect". Monetizing the Focus List also allows CalPERS to realize a return on the increased value that typically occurs following an engagement. In 2014, a study by Wilshire Associates showed the companies engaged by CalPERS significantly outperformed the Russell 1000.

==== Analysis of performance of companies on the Focus List ====
In 1994, Nesbitt published a study that found that companies on the Focus List trailed the S&P 500 prior to being put on the list, but outperformed the S&P 500 after being put on the list, and named this phenomenon the "CalPERS effect". The term has been used in the newsmedia. Whether a "CalPERS effect" actually exists has been studied in a number of subsequent papers, including:

- Michael P. Smith (1996) determined that shareholder wealth increased for companies that adopted changes proposed by CalPERS or made changes that resulting in reaching a settlement with CalPERS; however, shareholder wealth decreased for companies that resisted CalPERS' proposals.
- Wahal (1996) analyzed the efficacy of pension-fund activism for CalPERS and eight other funds such as TIAA-CREF. Of the firms targeted by the nine funds, "only firms targeted by Calpers experience[d] a positive stock price reaction".
- Crutchley et al. (1998) discovered that CalPERS' "less visible activism" in 1995-1997 corresponded with less returns on stocks than in 1992-1994 when CalPERS' activism was more aggressive.
- Two studies published by CalPERS staff (i.e., Anson et al.) in 2003-2004 found that stocks on the CalPERS Focus List experience "positive excess stock returns of about 12% over the three months following release of the list" and "an average one-year cumulative excess return of 59.4 per cent".
- English et al. (2004) concluded that CalPERS targeting produces a statistically significant improvement in short-term returns but not necessarily in long-term returns (depending on the specific methods used to calculate long-term returns).
- Nelson (2006) claimed that his study addressed problems in the methodologies of previous studies (e.g., by controlling for the "contaminating events" of The Wall Street Journal articles appearing just before or just after the dates that CalPERS released Focus List information). He found "no evidence to support the persistence of a 'CalPERS effect'" after 1993.
- Barber (2006) asserted that in his analyses "CalPERS activism yields small, but reliably positive, market reactions" in the short term. In contrast, although the long-term returns of companies "are uniformly positive and economically large" after being placed on the CalPERS Focus List, due to market volatility he could not conclude that the long-term returns were unusual. Barber's paper won a 2006 prize for best study in the area of socially responsible investing from the Haas School of Business.
- Junkin and Toth (2008), in an update of Nesbitt's 1994 study, found that the "CalPERS effect" was still present in that "the average targeted company produced excess returns of 15.7% above their respective benchmark return on a cumulative basis," but that the effect had decreased over time.

=== Notable investments ===
- The agency both lost and gained from investments in Enron (which went bankrupt in 2001) and its affiliated companies. Its losses included common stock worth $40 million; "stock in a different portfolio, some bonds and a separate investment in New Power Co." worth $100 million; and $4 million from the liquidation of Enron's JEDI II project (i.e., CalPERS had paid $175 million for its stake but received only $171 million in return). However, as CalPERS had earned $132.5 million from the sale of its stake in Enron's JEDI I project to Enron's Chewco project, its total Enron losses were only about $11 million. Although CalPERS "was alerted by its advisers in December 2000 about the serious and potentially embarrassing conflicts inherent in one of a web of private partnerships set up by Enron's chief financial officer, Andrew S. Fastow", it later denied that it could have taken actions to prevent Enron's downfall. Nevertheless, as a result of the Enron experience, in 2002 the CalPERS board did resolve to improve accounting and auditing standards among companies in which it invests.
- In June 2000, CalPERS announced that it would invest $500 million in biotech as part of its California Biotechnology Program. Ultimately, $235 million went to California-base venture capital firms specializing in the biotech sector.
- In 2002, the Republican Party questioned CalPERS' investing $100 million in a firm that was co-founded by a Democratic supporter. CalPERS denied any political influence in its investment decision.
- In 2002, it was revealed that CalPERS had invested $700 million in venture capital funds of billionaire Ronald Burkle who had donated "$1.9 million to Democratic candidates and causes". Phil Angelides denied that CalPERS made its decision because of the donations.
- As of 2002, CalPERS had invested $3.5 billion in "underserved areas of California".
- In 2002, CalPERS evaluated emerging markets for "evidence of political stability, humane labor laws, a fair and functional legal system and financial transparency"; on the basis of the evaluation, CalPERS placed the Philippines on "probation" for investment. In 2004, a consultant's recommendation to remove the Philippines from the "approved" list "contributed to a 3.3% drop... in the $55-billion Manila stock market". By 2006, CalPERS had given higher ratings to the Philippines, for which its President Gloria Macapagal Arroyo personally expressed appreciation.
- CalPERS has been criticized for being foolish to invest in collateralized debt obligations (CDOs) before the July 2007 mortgage meltdown and for not publicly addressing the issue.
- In June 2008, after Los Angeles-area property developer LandSource filed for bankruptcy protection, CalPERS was criticized for having invested $947 million in LandSource in 2007; a CalPERS spokesperson described the investment as "small" relative to CalPERS' total assets.
- As of 2021, CalPERS has invested about $30 billion in fossil fuels, which has been criticized by environmentalists.

=== Studies commissioned by CalPERS on its economic impacts ===
CalPERS commissioned three studies that were released in 2007-2008 about the economic impacts of the following:

- CalPERS retirement benefits payments. Prepared by California State University, Sacramento, and released in April 2007, this study found that the direct payments of $7.7 billion in 2006 led to a total impact (including "the ripple effect of business and government revenues as spending from... benefit checks works its way through the economy") of $11.8 billion.
- CalPERS investments. Prepared by California State University, Sacramento, and released in September 2007, this study found that the direct investments of $8.3 billion in 2006 led to a total impact of $15.1 billion.
- CalPERS health care benefits payments. Prepared by Lincoln Crow Benefits Research Group and released in April 2008, this study found that the direct payments of $4.2 billion in 2006 led to a total impact of $7.6 billion.

Key findings of the CalPERS Economic Impacts in California Report for the fiscal year ending June 30, 2012, included:

- CalPERS benefits (retirees spending their pensions) returned $10.85 in economic activity to California for each taxpayer dollar (public funds) contributed to the system.
- The total economic revenue generated by CalPERS benefits was more than $30.4 billion.
- CalPERS benefits created 113,664 jobs throughout California.
- Investments in California accounted for $20.7 billion, or approximately 8.9 percent, of the CalPERS portfolio.
- The CalPERS investment portfolio, which included public and private equities, real estate, fixed income, and infrastructure, supported 1.5 million jobs.

CalPERS touted the studies as demonstrating the value of the agency with news releases such as "CalPERS and CalSTRS Pensions Power Up State and Local Economies". The studies and their use by CalPERS were criticized as follows:

- A reporter summarized the opinion of the lead author of the first study as "his study was never intended as any sort of implied commentary on the wisdom of CalPERS' policies".
- If the money that CalPERS paid in benefits were returned to taxpayers, the money would be spent and would therefore still cause "ripple effects".
- The economic impact "might be the same if a private investment firm managed the fund's portfolio".

=== Employee recognition program ===
Among other "offerings to ensure [its] workers are happy as well as healthy," CalPERS has an onsite Montessori method child care facility, conducts employee surveys every two years, offers a training and wellness program, and administers a nationally known employee recognition program. The employee recognition program has several components:

- An informal day-to-day employee-to-employee program with a "You are the Rock" theme. The program includes a river rock that is passed around to employees who are "rock solid," rock-shaped notes with appreciative sentiments written on them, and rock-themed e-cards.
- The quarterly ACE (Achieving Communication Excellence) award, consisting of a lapel pin and an informal celebration.
- A formal annual recognition called APEX (Achieving Performance Excellence), with a crystal trophy, a cash award, and a luncheon.
- Managers are "encouraged to thank workers more often" and "are graded for the amount of ongoing feedback they gave employees".

Two CalPERS employees received 2000 National Association for Employee Recognition (NAER) Recognition Champion Awards for the employee recognition program. In addition, CalPERS itself won a 2002 Best Practices award from NAER. The employee recognition program was reported to contribute to high employee satisfaction and a low employee turnover rate at CalPERS.

== Contributions ==
=== Member contributions ===
CalPERS members contribute a percentage of their salary throughout their active membership. Member contribution rates are set by statute and can vary by membership category (miscellaneous or safety) and by benefit formula. Member contribution rates can change based on legislative law changes. However, the rise and fall of the contribution percentages does not affect member-accrued retirement benefits, which are guaranteed by law.

The percentage contributed above the monthly compensation breakpoint depends upon the benefit formula as shown in the "employee contributions" subsection of the summary of Plan Provisions in Appendix B of each public agency, state and schools annual valuation report.

With the passage of Assembly Bill 340 (AB 340), the pension reform legislation by the California Legislature, CalPERS members hired after January 1, 2013, are expected to pay 50 percent of the Total Normal Cost of the benefit plan in which they participate.

=== Employer contributions ===
On average, schools and other public agencies contribute 12.7% of payroll for their employees' retirement benefits; however, the rates can increase if CalPERS' investments perform unfavorably and decrease if CalPERS' investments perform favorably. According to CalPERS, "The School Pool contribution rate is affected by the investment return of a given fiscal year in the second year that follows" and "Local public agency contribution rates are affected by the investment return of a given fiscal year in the third fiscal year that follows". CalPERS' earnings and losses are averaged over 15 years to prevent extreme changes in employers' contribution rates. Nevertheless, in 2008 "CalPERS warned that it might ask for more money from the state starting in July 2010 and from local-government employers starting in July 2011" if CalPERS' investments are performing poorly as of June 30, 2009.

Employers’ contributions and stated unfunded liabilities are calculated using actuarial present value, which assumes the fund will continually grow at 7.5%. However, if an employer seeks to leave CalPERS, it will be required to immediately payoff the undisclosed current market value of the unfunded liabilities, which only assumes 2.56% growth. At a 2011 legislative hearing, Governor Jerry Brown called CalPERS asserted reliance on bringing in new members "a Ponzi scheme".

After the 2008 financial crisis, many cities in California came under financial stress due to a combination of factors, which led to three high-profile municipal bankruptcy filings by Vallejo, Stockton, and San Bernardino that received nationwide attention. During the proceedings some creditors accused CalPERS's increased post-crisis employer payments and future unfunded liabilities as a cause of insolvency and sought to have CalPERS employer contributions reduced. This was vigorously opposed by CalPERS. According to 2011 state figures, the CalPERS system is 78% funded with unfunded future liabilities of $133 billion. Non-government estimates show a larger shortfall.

== Benefits ==
CalPERS provides benefits to all state government employees and, by contract, to local agency and school employees. CalPERS administers the following categories of benefits to members:

- Retirement benefits under defined benefit plans
- Deferred compensation and other supplemental income plans
- Disability retirement and industrial disability retirement
- Death benefits
- Health benefits
- Long-term care benefits

=== Retirement benefits under defined benefit plans ===
As of 2020, CalPERS paid monthly allowances to 732,529 retirees, survivors, and beneficiaries. In the fiscal year 2019-20, CalPERS paid $25.8 billion in benefits. The retirement benefits "are calculated using a member's years of service credit, age at retirement, and final compensation (average salary for a defined period of employment)," and the retirement formulas "are determined by the member's employer (State, school, or local public agency); occupation (miscellaneous (general office and others), safety, industrial, or peace officer/firefighter); and the specific provisions in the contract between CalPERS and the employer".

In addition, CalPERS administers the Legislators' Retirement System, Judges' Retirement System, and Judges' Retirement System II.

Besides CalPERS, California has a number of other public retirement systems, including:

- At least 22 counties (Alameda, Contra Costa, Fresno, Imperial, Kern, Los Angeles, Marin, Mendocino, Merced, Orange, Sacramento, San Bernardino, San Diego, San Francisco [county as well as city], San Joaquin, San Luis Obispo, San Mateo, Santa Barbara, Sonoma, Stanislaus, Tulare, and Ventura)
- At least 6 cities (Concord, Fresno, Los Angeles, San Diego, San Francisco [also a county], and San Jose)
- The University of California
- The California State Teachers' Retirement System (CalSTRS)

CalPERS has reciprocity agreements with many of these California public retirement systems that allow retirees with service credit and contributions in two systems to receive payments from both systems.

Some people prefer defined contribution plans to CalPERS' defined benefit plan. For example:

- In 1996, Howard Kaloogian sponsored a bill in the State Assembly to allow state employees to choose between CalPERS' defined benefit plan and a defined contribution plan; the bill failed in a State Senate committee.
- In early 2005, Governor Arnold Schwarzenegger proposed a ballot initiative to require new public employees to join a 401(k)-like plan, but dropped the proposal after opposition to a provision in the initiative to "reduce benefits for widows of officers and firefighters killed in the line of duty".
- In November 2008, the voters of the city of Pacific Grove passed an advisory measure to leave CalPERS in favor of a defined contribution plan.

Among other arguments, CalPERS claims that defined contribution plans cost more to manage than defined benefit plans and fail to provide adequate funds to retirees.

=== Deferred compensation and other supplemental income plans ===
CalPERS is responsible for a deferred compensation retirement plan (457 plan) and two other plans to supplement income after retirement or permanent separation from State employment. As of December 2014:

- The CalPERS 457 Plan serves 27,526 participants and had $1.296 billion in assets.
- The Peace Officers' & Firefighters' Defined Contribution Plan had 33,128 participants and $497 million in assetsfunded by a State contribution of 2% of base pay.
- A member-funded Supplemental Contributions Program for 521 participants had $20.3 million in assets.

=== Disability retirement and industrial disability retirement ===
CalPERS offers two types of retirement benefits if a worker is disabled. In "industrial disability retirement," the "disability is due to a job-related injury or illness"; in contrast, "disability retirement" implies that the disability was not necessarily caused by employment. The specific benefits vary by employer, by the contract between CalPERS and the employer, and by the employee's occupation.

Two major controversies have affected CalPERS' disability retirement and industrial disability retirement program over the years. First, in the mid-1990s and again in the mid-2000s there were concerns about inappropriate industrial disability retirement for public safety personnel, including:

- Some non-disabled persons fraudulently claim industrial disability retirement, such as "a 'disabled' highway patrol officer riding in a rodeo". Unfortunately, "state law forbids Calpers from requiring disabled retirees who are 50 or older to submit to another medical evaluation, even if there is evidence of possible fraud".
- "A series of bills that expanded eligibility for these medical pensions - and made it easier to get them" increased costs for state and local governments.
- The list of "disabilities automatically presumed to be job-related for public-safety workers" has grown to include diseases and conditions that may or may not be caused by employment, such as lower back pain, heart disease, cancer, syphilis, HIV, and mad cow disease.
- Retirees can receive two safety disability retirements for the same condition if they are covered by two separate pension systems.
- Because California law prevents light-duty assignments in the California Highway Patrol, some officers are "forced to retire against their will".

Second, "a 1980 state law that tied public safety officers' disability benefits to the age at which they were hired" caused an age discrimination complaint with the Equal Employment Opportunity Commission (EEOC) in 1992 which eventually led to a 1995 class action lawsuit against CalPERS and other state and local agencies. In January 2003, CalPERS settled the suit by agreeing to pay $50 million in retroactive benefits and $200 million in future benefits to 1,700 officers; the settlement "was by far the largest in the EEOC's history". Furthermore, CalPERS agreed to not use an age-based formula in the future, which "basically nullifie[d]" the 1980 state law.

=== Death benefits ===
If a CalPERS member dies before retirement, CalPERS may provide death benefits to certain beneficiaries. The benefits can include one-time payments and/or monthly payments, but "depend on the member's age, years of service, job classification, employer's contract with CalPERS, eligible beneficiary, date of separation from employment, and whether or not they were eligible to retire at the time of death".

=== California Employers’ Retiree Benefit Trust Fund ===
The California Employers’ Retiree Benefit Trust Fund was established by CalPERS in March 2007 to provide California public agencies with a cost-efficient, professionally managed investment vehicle for prefunding other post-employment benefits (OPEB) such as retiree health benefits. Prefunding reduces an agency's long-term OPEB liability. Participating agencies can use investment earnings to pay future OPEB liabilities, similar to the CalPERS pension fund in which three out of four dollars paid in retirement benefits come from investment earnings.

=== Health benefits ===
In 1961, the Meyer-Geddes Hospital and Medical Health Care Act was passed, which led to SERS' offering health insurance for state employees beginning in 1962. After the Health Maintenance Organization (HMO) Act of 1973, PERS began to deal with HMOs "to create more unified and standardized health care benefit rates". In 1978, the Meyer-Geddes Act was renamed the "Public Employees' Medical and Hospital Care Act".

By the early 1990s, CalPERS received national attention for its attempt at implementing "managed competition," which is the theory that health care costs "can be controlled by forcing health providers to compete with one another under government supervision". As of 1994–1995, CalPERS contracted with 24 health plans for its "over 900,000" members and was able to reduce health insurance premiums by 1% compared with 1993–1994. At the time CalPERS was "called a model for the so-called health alliances" proposed in the 1993 Clinton health care plan.

Rates continued to decline by 5.3% in 1996 and 1.4% in 1997, but rose by 2.7% in 1998 and 5.1% in 1999. CalPERS attracted national attention again in the mid-2000s, this time for health maintenance organization rate increases of 25% in 2004 and 18% in 2005. Meanwhile, the number of participating plans dropped to seven as of 2003, and "more than two dozen cities, counties and school districts" (representing 4% of membership) left CalPERS as of 2004 because of high medical insurance rates.

A 2006 study by the Government Accountability Office determined that from 1997 through 2002 the average annual growth in CalPERS premiums (6.5%) was lower than that of the Federal Employees Health Benefits Program (FEHBP, 8.5%) and of other surveyed employer-sponsored health benefit programs (7.1%); however, between 2003 and 2006–7, the average annual growth rate in CalPERS premiums (14.2%) was higher than that of FEHBP (7.3%) and of other surveyed employer-sponsored health benefit programs (10.5%). As of 2008, CalPERS eliminated copayments for preventive care visits, raised copayments for other types of office visits, and took other measures in an attempt to reduce costs.

In 2010, Blue Shield of California, Dignity Health, and Hill Physicians Medical Group initiated an integrated health management program (similar to an Accountable Care Organization) that covered 41,000 CalPERS members.

In 2019, CalPERS provided more than $9.2 billion in health benefits for 1.5 million active and retired state, public agency, and school workers and their dependents. Therefore, it was the nation's second largest public purchaser of health benefits, behind the FEHBP which covered "about 8 million federal employees, retirees, and their dependents". Of the enrollees, 59% are state employees and 41% are local government and school employees; 68% are working and 32% are retired.

Enrollees can join three types of plans:

- 68% are enrolled in health maintenance organization plans administered by Blue Shield of California and by Kaiser Permanente.
- 25% are enrolled in preferred provider organization plans called "PERS Select," "PERSCare," and "PERS Choice," which are administered by Anthem Blue Cross (the California subsidiary of WellPoint).
- 7% are enrolled in "association" plans for the California Correctional Peace Officers Association, the California Association of Highway Patrolmen, and the Peace Officers Research Association of California.

=== Long-term care benefits ===
California's "Public Employees' Long-Term Care Act," as passed in 1990 and amended in 1996, led to CalPERS' administering a Long-Term Care Program for "California public employees and retirees, as well as their spouses, parents, parents-in-law, adult children and adult siblings between the ages of 18 and 79". Described as the "largest self-funded program of its kind", the program provides "nursing home care, residential assisted living, home health care, homemaker services and adult day care".

The program is funded by participant premiums and by proceeds from investments in the CalPERS Long-Term Care Fund. During an economic downturn in 2002, premiums for the program rose an average of 9% and investment losses were $99 million. Another premium increase of an average of 33.6% occurred in 2007 due to "a projected $600 million shortfall in the program over the next 50 to 60 years". The causes of the deficit predicted as of 2007 were less investment income than expected, a higher volume of claims than expected, and a lower dropout rate than expected. As of 2020, the program had 116,832 members who paid annual premiums of $278.5 million and who collectively received $337.3 million in benefits annually.

As of December 2014, the LTC program had 144,936 enrolled participants who paid annual premiums of more than $168 million from July 1, 2013, through December 31, 2013. The average premium collected during that time period was $2,177. The decrease in the total long-term care participant count may be attributable to the LTC program stabilization and sustainability measures and realized participant population morbidity.

The total benefits paid since the LTC program's inception in 1995 through June 30, 2013, have reached approximately $1.3 billion. A summary of plan types and a five-year historical participant count are available online in the CalPERS Comprehensive Annual Financial Report.

=== Member Home Loan Program ===
As of December 15, 2010, the CalPERS Board of Administration approved the suspension of the CalPERS Member Home Loan Program and stopped accepting new applications.

== Unfunded Liabilities Crisis ==
CalPERS faces significant unfunded liabilities which is likely to challenge its long-term financial stability. Official estimates place the liabilities at approximately $150 billion, an increase from $22 billion in 2002. The unfunded liabilities figure is a projection that takes into account returns on CalPERS investments. The $150 billion figure is based on a long term return of 7%; if the returns are higher, the true liability is much smaller, but if returns are lower than the liabilities are much larger. CalPERS itself projects that it will return 6.1% over the next decade and 8.3% for the decade after that. There are significant concerns that to keep up, contributions by municipal and state authorities will have to rise drastically, putting financial strain on those authorities.

According to the CalPERS chart Historical Factors Impact Funded Status (1993-2018), the most recent year with no unfunded liabilities was FY 2007.

== Criticisms ==
CalPERS has received criticism for the number of retirees (26,000 in 2018) who collect over $100,000 a year in pension. That group of people, while less than 4 percent of the total number of retirees receiving benefits from CalPERS, collect 17 percent of the total yearly pension payouts.

== See also ==
- California State Teachers' Retirement System (CalSTRS)
