= Pension spiking =

Artificially inflating compensation in order to receive larger pensions

Pension spiking, sometimes referred to as "salary spiking", is the process whereby public sector employees are granted large raises, bonuses, incentives or otherwise artificially inflate their compensation in the time immediately preceding retirement in order to receive larger pensions than they otherwise would be entitled to receive. This artificially inflates the pension payments due to the retirees.

Upon retirement any employee transitions from receiving a paycheck from the employer to a pension check drawn on the assets of the retirement fund; this amount is typically determined as a percentage of the employee's regular salary by state law or statute. When an employee due to retire receives a "spike", the amount of money the employee will receive does not reflect the percentage of salary the employee and employer haves contributed for the majority of the employee's career, and places a burden on the economic viability of the pension fund. This practice is considered a significant contributor to the high cost of public sector pensions.

Several states including Illinois have passed laws making it more difficult for employees to spike their pensions. The California CalPERS system outlawed this practice in 1993, but as of 2012 it remained legal in the 20 counties which did not participate in this public employee retirement system.

Pension spiking is often seen in public sector employers (who do not typically offer golden parachutes to employees the private sector does) and is an example of the principal–agent problem. In the classic principal–agent problem, a principal hires an agent to work on their behalf. The agent then seeks to maximize their own well-being within the confines of the engagement laid out by the principal. The agent, or bureaucrat in this instance, has superior information and is able to maximize their benefit at the cost of the principal. In other words, there is asymmetric information.

In the case of pension spiking the general public (the principal) elects officials to hire the bureaucrat who then hires the public servants, who are the ultimate agents of the general public. Thus, the principal is three steps removed from the bureaucrat. In the case of pension spiking, some have written that the public has allowed a pension system to be created which is based on the compensation in the last year of service and delegated the setting of this cost to the bureaucrat. The bureaucrat, who will often themselves benefit from a spiked pension or the same laws permitting pension spiking, fails to stop the practice, a clear conflict of interest.

Given that many public pension funds have been in existence for decades, it seems that it is the case that pension fund participants have found a way to manipulate an existing system to their benefit, rather than constructed a unique system. Issues also exist when pension funds allow the inclusion of overtime when determining the retiree's final pensionable salary.
