= California Office of Data and Innovation =

The California Office of Data and Innovation (ODI) is an office within the California Government Operations Agency. It manages data and statistics for the state of California.

Governor Jerry Brown hired Zachary Townsend as the inaugural Chief Data Officer (CDO) in GovOps on 1 July 2016.

In 2022, Newsom merged the Office of Innovation with CalData, renaming the office as the Office of Data and Innovation.

== Programs ==
=== data.ca.gov ===
ODI manages the California Open Data portal, first created in 2016. The data portal aggregates data from multiple state agencies.

=== Other programs ===
- CalData
- Data Innovation Fund
- CalAcademy
- CalInnovate

== Chief Data Officers ==
- Zachary Townsend (2016–2017)
- Joy Bonaguaro (2020–2023)
- Jason Lally (2024–present)
