= California Government Operations Agency =

California government agency

Government Operations Agency
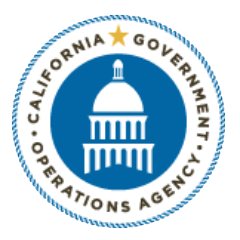

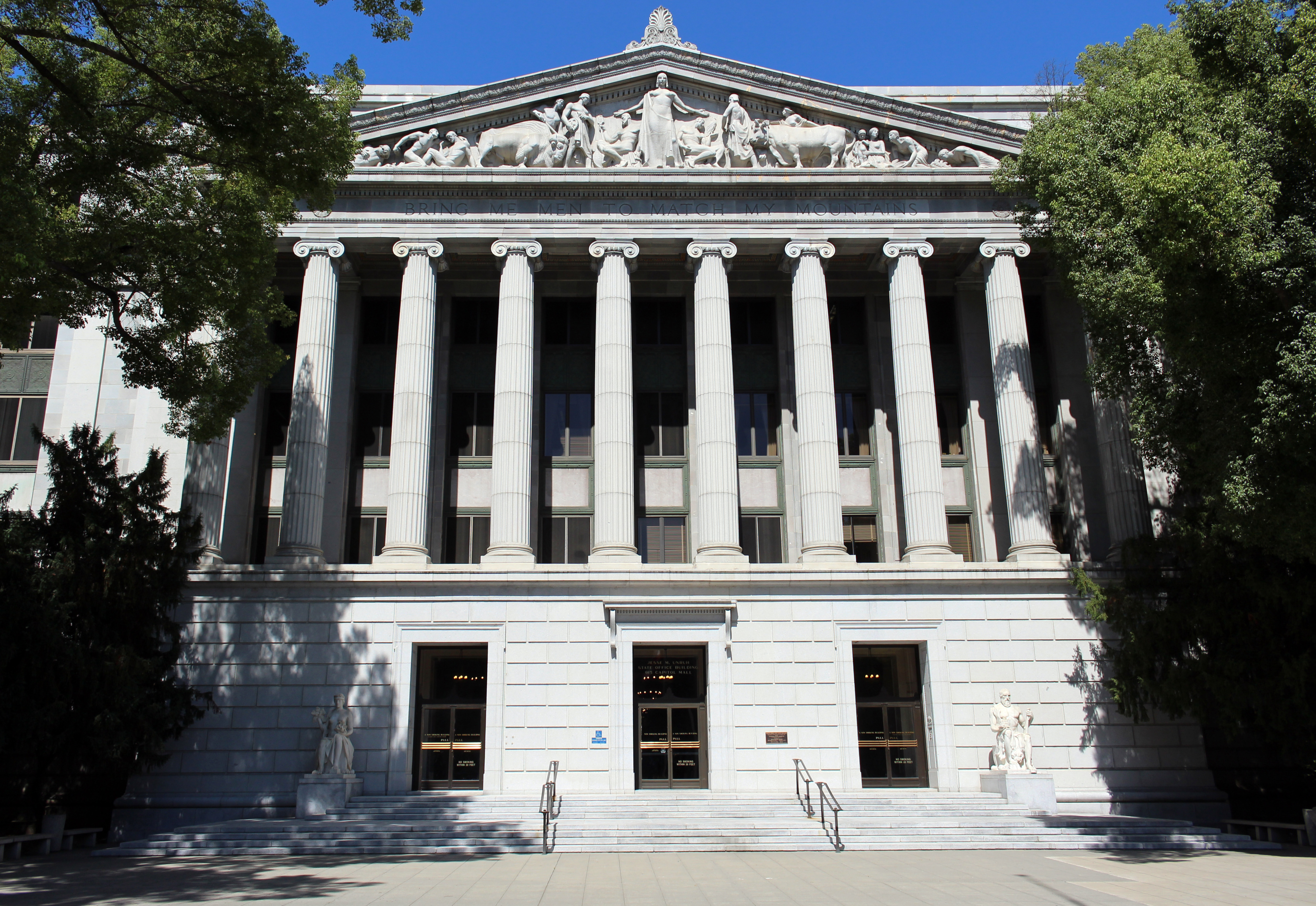
- Agency headquarters at the Jesse M. Unruh State Office Building

Agency overview
- Formed: July 1, 2013
- Jurisdiction: California
- Headquarters: Sacramento, California
- Employees: 22.275 (2019-20)
- Annual budget: $70 billion (2024-25)
- Agency executives: Nick Maduros, Secretary; Sarah Soto-Taylor, Under Secretary
- Website: govops.ca.gov

The Government Operations Agency (CalGovOps) is the California government agency responsible for administering state operations including procurement, real estate, information technology, and human resources. Amy Tong was appointed Secretary of Government Operations by Governor Gavin Newsom in March of 2022. Previously, the role was held by Secretary Yolanda Richardson and Secretary Marybel Batjer, who was appointed as the inaugural agency secretary in June 2013 by then-Governor Jerry Brown.

== Organization ==
The Government Operations Agency oversees 13 departments, boards, and offices:

- Office of Administrative Law (OAL)
- California Cradle-to-Career Data System (C2C)
- Department of FI$CAL
- Franchise Tax Board (FTB)
- Department of General Services (DGS)
- Department of Human Resources (CalHR)
- State Personnel Board (SPB)
- Public Employees' Retirement System (CalPERS)
- California Department of Tax and Fee Administration (CDTFA)
- State Teachers' Retirement System (CalSTRS)
- California Department of Technology (CDT)
- Victim Compensation Board (CalVCB)
- California Office of Data and Innovation (ODI)

Also under the CalGovOps’ purview is the DMV Reinvention Strike Team, established by Governor Gavin Newsom on January 9, 2019. The team is tasked with undertaking “comprehensive modernization and reinvention of the troubled California Department of Motor Vehicles (DMV) and make recommendations for new long-term leadership and reform at DMV – with an emphasis on transparency, worker performance, speed of service and overall consumer satisfaction.” The team was led by former CalGovOps Secretary Marybel Batjer and staffed by agency employees.
