= Pension-fund activism =

Pension-fund activism is the proactive use of the economic clout held by pension funds to materially improve working conditions and the conduct of corporations on behalf of unions and the pension's contributors. Pension funds are responsible for providing retirement income for employees in both the private and public sectors in some countries. The four largest are based in the United States, Australia, Japan, and Norway, respectively. In the United States, pension funds control some 10-15% of the American securities market.

"Pension-fund activism" differs from the tactics taken by so-called "activist shareholders", in that it is ostensibly focused by social good rather than driving increased profits for shareholders. However, pension managers can also engage in activism purely motivated by an attempt to increase their returns. There is some debate as to whether using the clout of pension funds is a legitimate means of improving conditions for workers.

== Sources ==
- Farkas, Bob (16 April 2018). "The Mirage of Pension-Fund Activism". Jacobin.
- McCarthy, Michael (7 March 2014). "Which Side Is Your Pension On?". Jacobin.
- Nolan, Hamilton (26 March 2018). "The Working Class Has a $3 Trillion Weapon. Are They Willing to Use It?". Splinter.
