= California Department of Finance =

Agency within the government of California

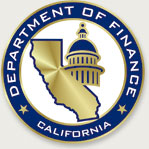
- Seal of the Department of Finance

Agency overview
- Headquarters: 915 L Street, Sacramento, California
- Annual budget: $83 million (2019-20)
- Agency executive: Erika Li, Interm Director
- Website: dof.ca.gov

The California Department of Finance is a state cabinet-level agency within the government of California. The Department of Finance is responsible for preparing, explaining, and administering the state's annual financial plan, which the governor of California is required under the Constitution of California to present by January 10 of each year to the general public. The Department of Finance's other duties include analyzing the budgets of proposed laws in the California State Legislature, creating and monitoring current and future economic forecasts of the state, estimating population demographics and enrollment projections, and maintaining the state's accounting and financial reporting systems.

The interm director of finance is Erika Li.

== Units within the department ==
There are nine financial units within the Department of Finance, administering the agency's various duties within the state government:

- Budget Operations Support (BOS)
- Legislative Analyses
- California State Accounting and Reporting System (CALSTARS): Accounting
- Demographic Research Unit (DRU)
- Economic/Financial Research Unit (ER/FR)
- Fiscal Systems and Consulting Unit (FSCU)
- Office of State Audits and Evaluations (OSAE)
- Performance Review Unit (PRU)
- Financial Information System for California Project

== Finance directors ==
Picture	Director	Term	Governor
	Alexander Heron	July 29, 1927 – January 30, 1930	C. C. Young
	Lyman King	January 31, 1930 – January 5, 1931	C. C. Young
	Rolland Vandegrift	January 6, 1931 – August 30, 1934	James Rolph; Frank Merriam
	Arlin Stockburger	January 31, 1935 – January 1, 1939	Frank Merriam
	Phil S. Gibson	January 2, 1939 – October 1, 1939	Culbert Olson
	John R. Richards	October 2, 1939 – September 10, 1940	Culbert Olson
	George Killion	September 11, 1940 – January 3, 1943	Culbert Olson
	John Hassler	January 4, 1943 – January 31, 1944	Earl Warren
	James S. Dean	February 1, 1944 – October 30, 1953	Earl Warren; Goodwin Knight
	John Pierce	November 1, 1953 – July 14, 1958	Goodwin Knight
	T. H. Mugford	July 15, 1958 – January 4, 1959	Goodwin Knight
	Bert Levit	January 5, 1959 – July 31, 1959	Pat Brown
	John E. Carr	August 1, 1959 – June 30, 1961	Pat Brown
	Hale Champion	July 1, 1961 – January 1, 1967	Pat Brown
	Gordon P. Smith	January 2, 1967 – February 29, 1968	Ronald Reagan
	Caspar Weinberger	March 1, 1968 – December 31, 1969	Ronald Reagan
	Verne Orr	January 1, 1970 – January 5, 1975	Ronald Reagan
	Roy M. Bell	January 6, 1975 – November 30, 1978	Jerry Brown
	Richard Silberman	December 1, 1978 – August 20, 1979	Jerry Brown
	Mary Ann Graves	August 21, 1979 – December 31, 1982	Jerry Brown
	Michael Franchetti	January 3, 1983 – January 3, 1984	George Deukmejian
	Jesse Huff	January 4, 1984 – December 25, 1990	George Deukmejian
	Thomas W. Hayes	January 7, 1991 – July 31, 1993	Pete Wilson
	Russell Gould	August 1, 1993 – February 24, 1996	Pete Wilson
	Craig Brown	March 4, 1996 – December 30, 1998	Pete Wilson
	B. Timothy Gage	January 4, 1999 – January 17, 2003	Gray Davis
	Stephen Peace	January 1, 2003 – November 16, 2003	Gray Davis
	Donna Arduin	November 17, 2003 – October 18, 2004	Arnold Schwarzenegger
	Tom Campbell	December 1, 2004 – November 10, 2005	Arnold Schwarzenegger
	Michael Genest	December 1, 2005 – December 14, 2009	Arnold Schwarzenegger
	Ana J. Matosantos	December 31, 2009 – December 7, 2010	Arnold Schwarzenegger
	Cynthia Bryant	December 7, 2010 – January 2, 2011	Arnold Schwarzenegger
	Ana J. Matosantos	January 3, 2011 – September 13, 2013	Jerry Brown
	Michael Cohen	September 14, 2013 – August 20, 2018	Jerry Brown
	Keely Martin Bosler	August 21, 2018 – July 31, 2022	Jerry Brown; Gavin Newsom
	Joe Stephenshaw	August 1, 2022 – November 2026	Gavin Newsom

== See also ==
- Economy of California
- California State Treasurer
- California State Controller
