= California State Retirees =

California State Retirees (CSR) is the largest organization representing retired California state government employees. Organizing health care and pension benefits 36,000 members. It is an affiliate of the California State Employees Association headquartered in Sacramento, California. Other organizations may include retirees from various former employers, but California State Retirees is composed exclusively of state retirees.

California State Retirees was previously known as California State Employees Association Retirees (CSEA Retirees) until September 2011.
