= California Department of Human Resources =

Department overview
- Formed: 1981 (as Department of Personnel Administration); 2012 (as Department of Human Resources)
- Jurisdiction: Government of California
- Headquarters: 1810 16th Street, Sacramento, California, U.S.
- Employees: 297.5 (2015-2016)
- Department executive: Adria Jenkins-Jones
- Website: www.calhr.ca.gov

The California Department of Human Resources (CalHR) is the California government agency responsible for human resource management of state employees, including issues related to salaries and benefits, job classifications, training, and recruitment. It is part of the Government Operations Agency. CalHR was created in 2012, consolidating the former Department of Personnel Administration (DPA) with most of the operations of the State Personnel Board.

CalHR represents the Governor as the "employer" in all matters pertaining to California State personnel employer-employee relations. It is responsible for all issues related to salaries and benefits, job classifications, and training. For most employees, these matters are determined through the collective bargaining process.

It is authorized by the California Government Code §19815 through §19999.7 and §3512 through §3524 (otherwise known as the Ralph C. Dills Act), as well as the California Code of Regulations, Title 2, §599.600 through §599.995.

== History ==
DPA was created in 1981 through a Governor's reorganization act to administer those aspects of the State personnel system that had become subject to collective bargaining under the Ralph C. Dills Act. In 1984, another Governor's reorganization transferred responsibility for allocating State positions to the appropriate civil service classification from the State Personnel Board to DPA. (Prior to DPA's creation, SPB was the sole personnel agency in the executive branch.)

In 2012, under a reorganization plan by Governor Jerry Brown, the California Department of Human Resources was created, combining DPA with many of the functions and staff of the SPB. A year later, CalHR, which had previously reported directly to the Governor, was moved into the newly created Government Operations Agency. This shift aimed to streamline state operations and improve efficiency in managing California's workforce.
