= California State Employees Association =

The California State Employees Association (CSEA) was founded in 1931.

== History ==
Headquartered in Sacramento, California, the organization itself grew out of a campaign to pass a ballot initiative to amend the California state constitution to create a retirement system for California state workers (now called the California Public Employees' Retirement System).

As a result of the campaign, the core of leadership for the campaign went on to create the association to maintain the momentum of that political victory by forming a credit union, now known as The Golden One Credit Union, for state employees, winning voter approval of the merit system for state civil service, and a 40-hour workweek and, finally in 1979, winning collective bargaining rights for state and university employees in the California legislature, also known as the Dills Act after its author Senator Ralph C. Dills.

When California adopted collective bargaining for state employees in 1979, CSEA began a long period of reorganization wherein its members were divided into four distinct classes depending on their employment or retirement status with the State of California. Ultimately, each of the four classes of members formally incorporated their respective organizations within the pre-existing corporate structure of CSEA as affiliates of CSEA. Each of these four affiliates have assumed authority for their respective member representation programs. CSEA now only provides business services of accounting, IT and member benefits for the four affiliated organizations which represent active and retired state and California State University system employees. CSEA governance is currently an eight-member board of directors composed of two representatives from each of the four affiliates. The board of directors elects its officers, as required by California corporate code, from among these eight board members.

== Affiliates ==
CSEA's four affiliates are:

SEIU Local 1000 - (Local 1000) - Represents about 95,000 rank and file civil service state employees in California.

Association of California State Supervisors - (ACSS) - Represents about 12,800 state civil service managers, supervisors and confidential employees who are excluded from collective bargaining.

California State University Employees Union - (CSUEU/SEIU 2579) - Represents about 15,000 rank and file employees of the California State University system.

California State Retirees - (CSR) - Represents about 30,000 retired state employees including rank and file employees regardless of bargaining unit as well as managerial and other non-represented state employees who retired from active service with the state of California or the California State University system.

== See also ==
- Service Employees International Union
