= FI$Cal =

California government operations agency

FI$CAL

Agency overview
- Formed: 2016
- Headquarters: Sacramento, California; 38.575°N 121.505°W
- Agency executive: Subbarao Mupparaju, Director
- Parent agency: California Government Operations Agency
- Website: fiscal.ca.gov

The Financial Information System for California, branded as FI$Cal, is a state government department under the California Government Operations Agency of the executive branch of the government of California.

The department operates the statewide financial system that enables California to perform budgeting, procurement, cash management and accounting functions transparently and efficiently.

== History ==
The Financial Information System for California began in 2005 with a total of five state employees tasked with replacing one internal facing budget system for the Department of Finance. The focus of the project soon shifted to address the need to modernize the state’s entire financial management process into a single financial management system. In July 2016, the California Department of FISCal (FI$Cal) was formally recognized as a new state of California department. On June 25, 2021, FI$Cal successfully deployed the final functionality of the FI$Cal project and in September 2022, the department received formal recognition of project completion with the passing of Assembly Bill 156.

== Purpose ==
The FI$Cal system modernizes how the state of California manages its finances and is among the largest public sector information technology systems in the world. The system eliminates the need for hundreds of independent legacy systems by combining the state’s accounting, budgeting, cash management and procurement operations into a single financial-management system.

Complex by its very nature, there are currently 152 departments and approximately 14,000 end users using the system, processing $421 billion in expenditures in the fiscal year 2021-2022. The State Treasurer’s Office system functionality handled in excess of $3.1 trillion in state government banking transactions in fiscal year 2021-2022.

== Divisions ==
The department is organized into several divisions.

- Administrative Services Division
- Business Operation and Solutions Division
- Information Technology Division
