= Contra Costa County Employees' Retirement Association =

Organization

Contra Costa County Employees' Retirement Association CCCERA
Agency overview
- Formed: July 1, 1945; 81 years ago
- Headquarters: Concord, California
- Agency executive: Chief Executive Officer; Chief Investment Officer; Chief Financial Officer
- Website: www.cccera.org

Contra Costa County Employees' Retirement Association (CCCERA) is a retirement association for Contra Costa County, California's public employees.

It provides defined benefit plans to the county and other local agencies. The association is a system that provides retirement benefits to employees of Contra Costa County and 16 participating public employers located within the county.

== Member organizations ==
As of December 31, 2007, the participating agencies/districts include:

- Bethel Island Municipal Improvement District
- Byron, Brentwood, Knightsen Union Cemetery District
- Central Contra Costa Sanitary District
- Contra Costa County Employees’ Retirement Association
- Contra Costa Housing Authority
- Contra Costa Mosquito and Vector Control District
- First 5 – Children & Families Commission
- In-Home Supportive Services Authority
- Local Agency Formation Commission
- Rodeo Sanitary District
- Superior Court of Contra Costa County
- Contra Costa Fire Protection District
- East Contra Costa Fire Protection District
- Moraga-Orinda Fire Protection District
- Rodeo-Hercules Fire Protection District
- San Ramon Valley Fire Protection District

== Structure ==
The retirement benefit structure of CCCERA is based upon the County Employees Retirement Law (CERL) of 1937, commonly referred to as the “37 Act.” On March 6, 1944, the Contra Costa County Board of Supervisors voted to adopt an ordinance giving county voters the opportunity to accept or reject the CERL as the framework for retirement benefits for county employees. The measure was passed by the voters. CCCERA began functioning on July 1, 1945. As of 2008, 20 of California's 58 counties have retirement systems that follow the stipulations of the ’37 Act.

The service retirement, disability, death and survivor benefits provided by CCCERA are administered by a 12 member Board of Retirement. The Board adopts regulations, procedures, policies and resolutions as permitted by and amended in the CERL. The Contra Costa County Board of Supervisors may also adopt resolutions which affect member benefits, as permitted by the County Employees' Retirement Law of 1937. The Retirement Board is responsible for general management of CCCERA while a Chief Executive Officer oversees the operations of the Association. A Comprehensive Annual Financial Report (CAFR) outlines financial, investment, actuarial and statistical information about the Association in detail. The CAFR also includes an Independent Auditor’s Report focusing on CCCERA’s financial statements.

As of December 31, 2012, CCCERA’s net assets were approximately 6.5 billion dollars. By comparison, as of December 31, 1945, the Association’s total assets stood at just under $45,600. At the close of 1946, the Association numbered approximately 550 members. CCCERA’s 2013 membership was approximately 20,000. This figure represents active employees, retirees, beneficiaries and deferred members.

CCCERA is a contributory defined benefit plan, as mandated by the regulations of the CERL. This plan requires both employers and employees to contribute to the fund. A defined benefit retirement plan does not base future retirement benefits on how much the employee and employer contribute to the fund, nor do fluctuating investment returns play a role in determining final retirement allowances. Rather, a fixed formula, stipulated by the 1937 Act, determines members’ future retirement allowances. Retirement benefits are calculated using three important variables within the following formula:

Highest Average Years of Retirement Age at Monthly Salary x Service Credit x Retirement Age Factor

As of 2008, CCCERA administers 8 different benefit tiers. All tiers use the above formula, however. Highest Average Monthly Salary is computed using the highest 36 consecutive months of salary for Tier 2 and Safety Tier C members; the highest 12 consecutive months of salary are used for the remaining 6 tiers. Retirement Service Credit corresponds to the length of time a member has worked while actively contributing to the retirement system. Service credit may also comprise time with another ’37 Act County or “reciprocal” agency and may also include time “purchased” as a prior public servant (military service or federal government for example). Retired members are entitled to an annual cost of living (COLA) increase, granted by the board, effective April 1 of each year. This benefit is based on the San Francisco-Oakland-San Jose area Consumer Price Index and may range up to between 2% and 4%.

CCCERA is not responsible for providing health benefits to its members. These are administered by the Human Resources department of Contra Costa County. Known as “Other Post Employment Benefits” (OPEB), the County provides post retirement health benefits for employees who have retired under CCCERA and to the spouses and dependents of these retirees. The County also provides health and dental benefits to active members through contracting with various health and dental plans. Such benefits are established through negotiations between Contra Costa County and the various bargaining units that represent the County's employees. The stipulations of OPEB may be modified, altered or terminated at any time and for any reason as provided in the plan documents. Unlike OPEBs, a CCCERA member's pension is a lifetime benefit.

As of 2012, it has significant underfunding liabilities in excess of $1.9 billion. An investigative series by the Contra Costa Times in 2009 highlighted pension spiking issues.

== Reciprocity ==
CCCERA has reciprocity with 19 other 1937 Act counties as well as CalPERS (California Public Employees Retirement System). It also has limited reciprocity with some other California cities, public agencies, and retirement systems. The official site lists more specifics.
