= History of retirement =

Aspect of social history

Retirement, or the practice of leaving one's job or ceasing to work after reaching a certain age, has been around since the 18th century. Retirement as a government policy began to be adopted by countries during the late 19th century and the 20th century.

== 18th century and prior ==
There had been a long practice beginning in the Roman Empire to the modern nation states of providing pension to those who had served in the military.

Cotton Mather, the 18th century New England Puritan minister and author, proposed that elderly people should be "pleased with the retirement which you are dismissed into".

== 19th century ==
In 1881, the conservative German chancellor, Otto Von Bismarck, in a maneuver against Marxists who were burgeoning in power and popularity, announced that anyone over 70 years old would be forced to retire and that he would pay a pension to them. Bismarck drafted the formal request by Emperor, William I in 1881 to the Reichstag: "...those who are disabled from work by age and invalidity have a well-grounded claim to care from the state" The German welfare program provided contributory retirement benefits and disability benefits. Participation in the retirement system was mandatory and contributions were taken from the employee, the employer and the government.

In the mid-1800s certain United States municipal employees, including firefighters, police and teachers, started receiving public pensions. In 1875, the American Express Company began to offer private pensions. By the 1920s, a variety of American industries, from railroads to oil to banking, began offering pensions.

== 20th century ==
In his 1905 valedictory address to the Johns Hopkins Hospital, the eminent Canadian physician William Osler expressed his conviction that a man's best work was done before he was forty years old, and that by age sixty, he should retire. He called the ages between twenty five and forty the "15 golden years of plenty". Workers between ages forty and sixty were tolerable because they were "merely uncreative". But after age sixty the average worker was useless and should be put out to pasture.

Retirement as a concept began to be widely adopted in the United States after the period of the Industrial Revolution, where numerous factory workers began to show signs of aging: slowing down assembly lines, taking excessive sick days and usurping the spots of more youthful, more profitable men with families to bolster. Also, older workers brought about unemployment among the youthful population by declining to resign. The Great Depression exacerbated things. Though retirement was viewed by some as an essential adjustment, many among the older populace resisted the idea of retirement.

By 1935, the idea of paying older persons a pension sufficient to get them to quit working became widespread. A Californian, Francis Townsend, proposed a plan offering compulsory retirement at age 60. In return, the Legislature would pay benefits of up to $200 a month, provided he spent it all quickly. Some Republicans supported the Townsend Plan but most experts said it would be impossible to finance. President Franklin D. Roosevelt had a team working on a plan and in 1935 he secured the Social Security Act of 1935, which made workers and their employers fund their retirement at age 65.

Eleanor Roosevelt said hopefully of retirees, "Old people love their own things even more than young people do. It means so much to sit in the same chair you sat in for a great many years." However, most resigned individuals wished they could work. The issue was still intense in 1951, when the Corning Company assembled a round table to make sense of how to make retirement more popular.

By 1910, Florida got to be distinctly available as a retirement destination to the white collar class. Retirement communities started to show up in the 1920s and 30s. The explosion of golf courses, and the onset of films and TV transformed having nothing to do into a leisure time activity. The distribution in 1955 of Senior Citizen magazine, which quickly went defunct, contained the first popular usage of the phrase "senior citizen".

In 1999, The American Association of Retired Persons dropped "Retired" from its name and turned into "AARP Inc." to reflect that its focus was no longer American retirees.

== Present day ==
According to the Mental Health Foundation, one in five of present-day retirees experiences depression. Those living alone because of bereavement or divorce are more at risk. Physical health problems can also make people more vulnerable to mental health issues. Recent studies have indicated that "retirement increases the chances of suffering from clinical depression by around 40 percent, and of having at least one diagnosed physical illness by 60 percent" On the other hand, many workers have adopted scaling back on their jobs at around 55 or 60, or even changing careers, but still working for 15–20 more years.

== See also ==
- Retirement age

== References and further reading ==
- Angela, M. O., and John C. Henretta, eds. Age and inequality: Diverse pathways through later life (Routledge, 2018).
- Achenbaum, W. Andrew. Social Security: Visions and Revisions (1986), a scholarly history of Social Security and retirement in the USA. online
- Davidson, Liz (2016), The History of Retirement Benefits, Workforce.com
- Graebner, William. A History of Retirement: The Meaning and Function of an American Institution, 1885-1978 (Yale UP, 1980): online
- Laskow, Sarah (2014), How Retirement Was Invented, The Atlantic
- Macnicol, John. "Older men and work in the twenty-first century: What can the history of retirement tell us?" Journal of Social Policy 37.4 (2008): 579-595. on the United Kingdom online
- Minkler, Meredith, and Carroll L. Estes, eds. Readings in the political economy of aging (1984)
- Myles, John. "Postwar capitalism and the extension of social security into a retirement wage." in Critical perspectives on aging (Routledge, 2020) pp. 293–309.
- Richards, Carl (2016), "A Retirement Plan With Less Golf but More Satisfaction", The New York Times
- Thane, Pat. "The history of retirement." in The Oxford handbook of pensions and retirement income (2006): 33-51.
- Weisman, Mary-Lou (1999), "The History of Retirement, From Early Man to A.A.R.P.", The New York Times
- Zickar, Michael J. "The evolving history of retirement within the United States." in The Oxford handbook of retirement (2013): 10-21.
- "A brief history of retirement: It's a modern idea", The Seattle Times, 2013
- "A Timeline of the Evolution of Retirement in the United States", Memos and Fact Sheets, Georgetown University Law Center, 2010
