= Central Contra Costa Sanitary District =

American government body in California

The Central Contra Costa Sanitary District (CCCSD), also called Central San, provides sanitary sewage transport and treatment for the central portion of Contra Costa County, California. The main facility is a 54-million-US-gallon (200,000 m^{3}) per day treatment plant in residential Martinez, California and it provides service to approx 462,000 residents. It operates and maintains 1,500 miles (2,400 km) of sewer lines out of its second location in Walnut Creek, California. It is a California Energy Commission Showcase Plant.

== History ==
In the 1940s, central Contra Costa County was a rural area of farms, orchards and a few small towns. With the end of World War II, a building boom began. As the nearby cities of San Francisco, Oakland and Berkeley grew, so did the population of Contra Costa County. This ultimately resulted in a sanitation crisis with most of the county depending on septic systems, often inefficient due to the area's heavy adobe clay soil. At the time, State health authorities considered the polluted conditions arising from those septic tanks to be among the worst in California.

With septic tanks overflowing and waterborne diseases such as typhoid becoming a potential threat, civic leaders rallied public support for a solution. In an election held on June 24, 1946, a proposal to form a sanitary district for areas of central Contra Costa County was approved. On July 15, 1946, the County Board of Supervisors passed a resolution officially creating the Central Contra Costa Sanitary District (CCCSD).

Board Members attended a groundbreaking ceremony on November 10, 1947, to mark Central San's first construction—the main trunk sewer at the east end of Moraga Boulevard. Work began immediately and within 26 months, CCCSD's newly constructed main sewer trunk line and treatment plant were operational. At that time, CCCSD's service area population was 15,000; the treatment plant's capacity was 4.5 million US gallons (17,000 m^{3}) per day; and the CCCSD's collection system consisted of 50 miles (80 km) of sewer pipe.

That original system was expected to handle the area's wastewater for at least two decades. But by 1952, it was obvious that demand would soon exceed capacity. CCCSD began a series of expansions and improvements to meet the needs of a rapidly growing population.

Enormous changes have occurred since the District's beginnings in 1946 as a small agency serving a rural area: the size, population, and characteristics of the service area; the processes and technologies used to treat and collect wastewater; the environmental awareness and stricter water quality standards and regulations.

CCCSD is one of the largest sewage plants to use ultraviolet disinfection. Its facilities include a cogeneration system, two multiple hearth furnaces for dried sludge incineration, and a recycled water plant.

== See also ==
- Contra Costa County Employees' Retirement Association County Retirement Plan (member)
