= California State Personnel Board =

California state government agency

State Personnel Board
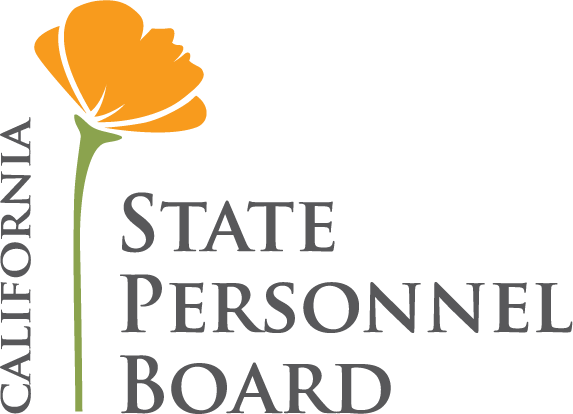

Agency overview
- Formed: June 8, 1976
- Type: Human resources administration and administrative hearings
- Agency executives: Suzanne M. Ambrose, Executive Officer; Kathy Baldree, President of the Board
- Parent agency: California Government Operations Agency
- Website: spb.ca.gov

The California State Personnel Board (SPB), one of California's constitutional offices, is one of the California agencies responsible for administration of the merit-based civil service employment system for California state agencies, the other being the California Department of Human Resources.

== History ==
The Board was established by Article VII, section 2 of the California Constitution, as amended on June 8, 1976. Staff positions in the Supreme Court of California, the California Courts of Appeal, the California Legislature, the University of California and the California State University are not administered by the board.

== Functions ==
The board sets and enforces rules for state civil service appointments and exams, and maintains a staff of administrative law judges to resolve various human resources issues, such as whistleblower complaints, disability and medical condition discrimination complaints including reasonable accommodation denials and appeals from unfavorable human resources decisions (e.g. reprimand, salary reduction, suspension without pay, demotion or dismissal). Appeals from the Board's administrative law department are heard by the Board itself.

With the exception of board hearing procedures relating to disciplinary and merit matters, disability and medical discrimination complaints, public testimony or participation, drug testing and grounds for employee discipline, the Board is exempt from the Administrative Procedure Act. However, even when subject to the Act, it is exempt from a variety of the Act's most onerous requirements, such as performing an adverse economic impact analysis.

The Board has faced controversy for some of its decisions, such as its order reinstating a nurse's aide who removed money from an elderly man's drawer in a police sting prompted by thousands of dollars in thefts from the veteran's home in which she worked, as well as favorable decisions in the cases of doctors who peers considered unsafe around patients, and a psychiatric technician who hit a patient with his shoes.

== Membership ==
As of February 22, 2022, the SPB is composed of the following five members:

Name	Position
Kathy Baldree	President
Mona Pasquil Rogers	Vice President
Shawnda Westly	SPB Member and CalPERS Representative
Kimiko Burton	SPB Member
Lauri Shanahan	SPB Member

== See also ==
- California Department of Human Resources
- United States Merit Systems Protection Board
