= California Victim Compensation Board =

Board within the California Government Operations Agency

Agency overview
- Formed: 1911
- Preceding agencies: State Board of Examiners; State Board of Control
- Jurisdiction: State of California
- Headquarters: P.O. Box 3036, Sacramento, California
- Employees: 267 (2024-25)
- Annual budget: $163.8 million (2024-25)
- Agency executive: Lynda Gledhill, Executive Officer
- Parent agency: California Government Operations Agency
- Website: victims.ca.gov

The Victim Compensation Board (CalVCB) is a state agency of the U.S. state of California that oversees the provision of compensation to victims of violent crime and the collection of restitution from criminal offenders. CalVCB is part of the California Government Operations Agency (CalGovOps). The board consists of three members: the Secretary of CalGovOps, who serves as the chair; the California State Controller; and a member appointed by the Governor, currently vacant.

== History ==
=== Board of Examiners (1856–1911) ===
The Board's predecessor was the Board of Examiners. The California Legislature established the Board of Examiners in 1856 to examine the books of the State Controller and State Treasurer and to oversee the money in the treasury. The Board's membership consisted of the Governor, the Secretary of State, and the Attorney General. The Legislature enacted another law in 1858 revising the role of the Board to include ruling on claims against the State for which appropriations had been made, counting the money in the state treasury, and examining the books of the Controller and Treasurer.

=== State Board of Control (1911–2001) ===
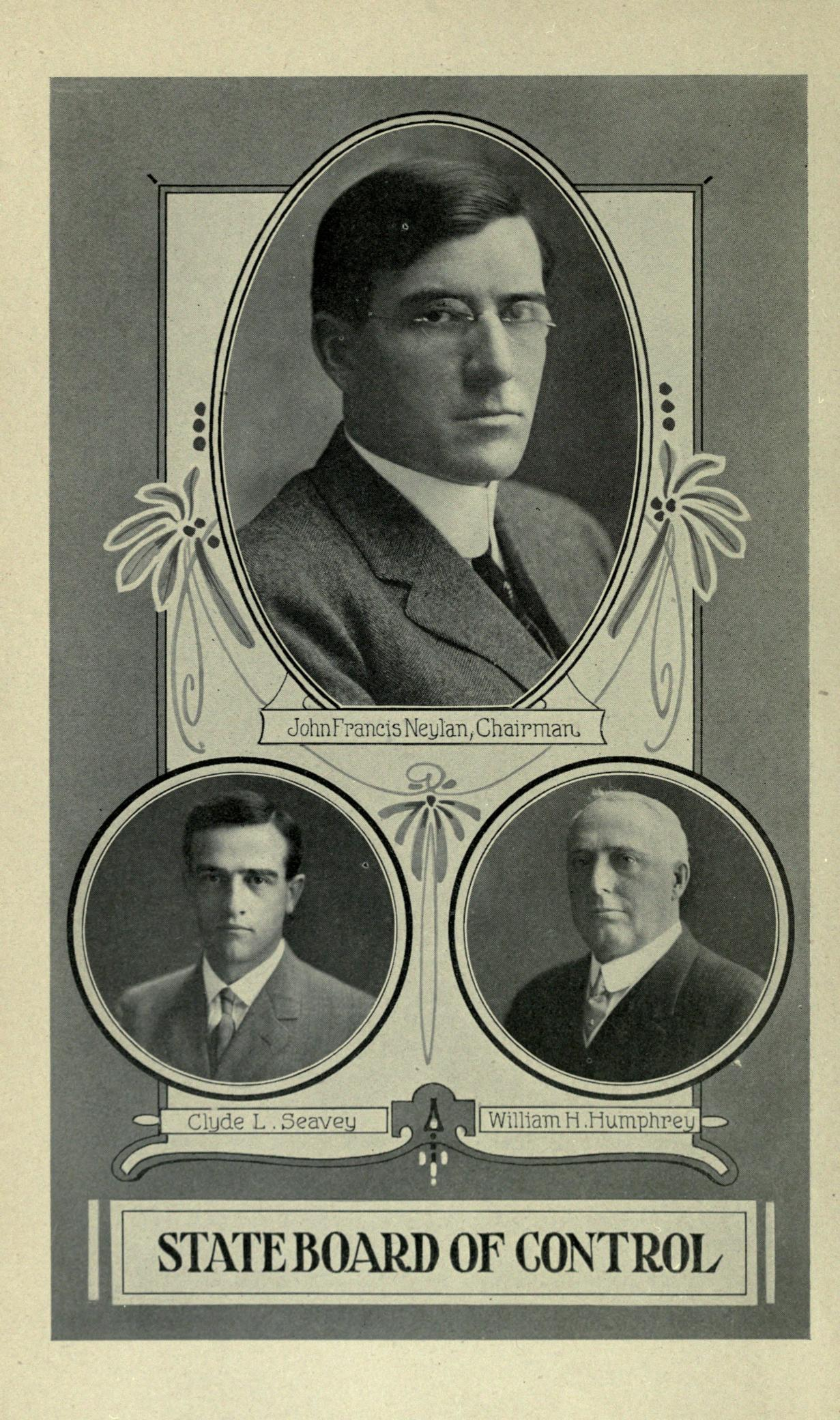
Portraits of the Board members in 1911, chaired by John Francis Neylan

In 1911, the legislature abolished the Board of Examiners and established the State Board of Control in its place. The new Board of Control was given centralized control of the financial outlays of most state agencies. This was a Progressive Era effort pushed by Governor Hiram Johnson to make the government more efficient, modeled on similar boards in Iowa and Minnesota.

The Board also assumed many of the functions of the Board of Examiners. It consisted of three members appointed by the Governor. During this era, the Board of Control was, according to one newspaper editorial, "the most important bureau of the State government, with the largest measure of power in directing the activities of the government."

A major government reorganization in 1927, promulgated by Governor C.C. Young, transferred most of the Board's responsibilities to the Department of Finance and to the State Controller. The Board of Control's remaining responsibilities included auditing and determining claims against the State, and regulating travel expenses and allowances for state employees and officers. Membership now consisted of the director of the Department of Finance, acting as chairman; the State Controller; and the chief of the finance department's Division of Service and Supply.

Activity of the Board of Control from its reorganization in 1927 through the mid-1960s consisted of many routine procedures. Determination and authorization of claims during its twice-monthly meetings was a significant part of the workload. The State Merit Award Program, instituted in 1950, provided one of the earliest specialized claims programs administered by the Board of Control. The Merit Award Program allowed state employees to be financially rewarded for their suggestions that reduced or eliminated state expenditures or improved operations after those suggestions were implemented. The Board of Control appointed four of the five board members to the State Merit Award Board and provided final action decisions for compensation to state employees. The Merit Award Program was transferred away from the Board of Control to the Department of General Services in 1976.

In 1965, the Board was given the responsibility of administering the state's new "Good Samaritan" law (also known as "Indemnification of Private Citizens"), which provided compensation for citizens who suffered damages while trying to prevent a crime or apprehend a criminal. In 1967, the administration of the state's victim compensation program (which had been created in 1965) was transferred to the Board from the Department of Social Welfare.

The Claims, Rulemaking, and Fiscal Control Program within the Board of Control developed in the early 1970s and became known as the Government Claims Program. The increasing size and complexity of state government required that uniform rules and regulations be developed and implemented regarding fiscal matters and the need for equitable treatment. Another reason to create the Government Claims Program was the increased number of claims filed against the State, overloading the courts and creating a substantial backlog. This program dealt with specific fiscal operations managed by the Board such as: review of discharge of accounts receivable by the state; refunds, credits, and cancellation of taxes; sale and disposal of unclaimed property; transfer of funds between state agencies; determination of pro-rata share of administrative costs payable by each state agency; determination of headquarters for purposes of travel claims; and hearings regarding purchase and bid protests.

=== Victim Compensation and Government Claims Board (2001–2016) ===
To more accurately reflect its increasing roles and responsibilities, the Board of Control was renamed the Victim Compensation and Government Claims Board in 2001, overseeing the California Victim Compensation Program, the Revenue Recovery Program and the Government Claims Program.

In 2016, the Government Claims Program was transferred to the Department of General Services, and the agency was renamed as the Victim Compensation Board.

== Victim Compensation Program (CalVCP) ==
The California Victim Compensation Program (CalVCP) provides compensation for victims of violent crime who are injured or threatened with injury. Among the crimes covered are domestic violence, child abuse, sexual and physical assault, homicide, robbery, drunk driving and vehicular manslaughter. If a person meets eligibility criteria, CalVCP will compensate many types of services when the costs are not covered by other sources. Eligible services include medical and dental care, mental health services such as psychotherapy, income loss, funeral expenses, rehabilitation and relocation. Funding for CalVCP comes from restitution fines and orders, penalty assessments levied on persons convicted of crimes and traffic offenses, and federal matching funds.

The Board's Restitution and Recovery Program works to ensure that, where possible, perpetrators of violent crimes are ordered by the courts to pay restitution.

The CalVCP program was the first program of its kind when it began in 1965, with the goal to help and provide financial assistance to victims of violent crime and those at threat of personal injury from crime.

== Additional responsibilities of the California Victim Compensation Board ==
Restitution Recovery: A highly effective revenue recovery program focuses on collecting restitution payments and reimbursements from criminal offenders that in turn fund compensation for crime victims.

Compensation for Good Samaritans: The Board administers the provisions of California law that provide for compensation to Good Samaritans who suffer injury or loss as a result of their efforts to prevent a crime, apprehend a criminal, or rescue a person in immediate danger of injury or death.

Missing Children Reward Program: The California Legislature created the Missing Children Reward Program to assist local law enforcement agencies and other parties involved in the identification and recovery of missing children in California.

Claims of Erroneously Convicted Felons: Under California law, a person erroneously convicted of a felony and incarcerated in a California state prison may file a claim against the state for pecuniary loss.

California State Employees Charitable Campaign: The Board assists with the administration of the California State Employees Charitable Campaign. This campaign provides a single, coordinated fund-raising drive that allows state employees to direct contributions from their paychecks to any of the hundreds of participating charitable organizations.
