= 2016 United States Senate election in California =

- November 8, 2016
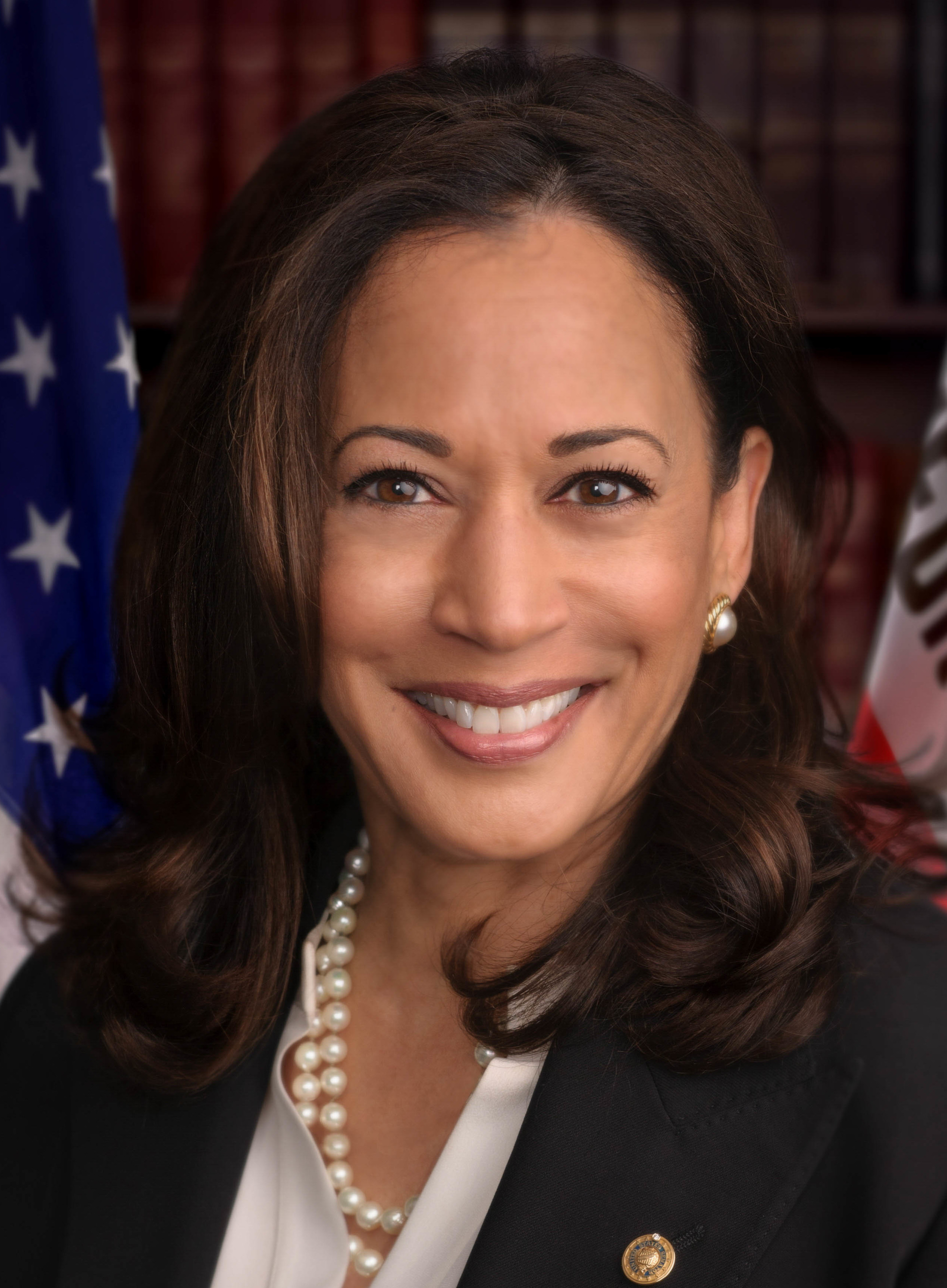

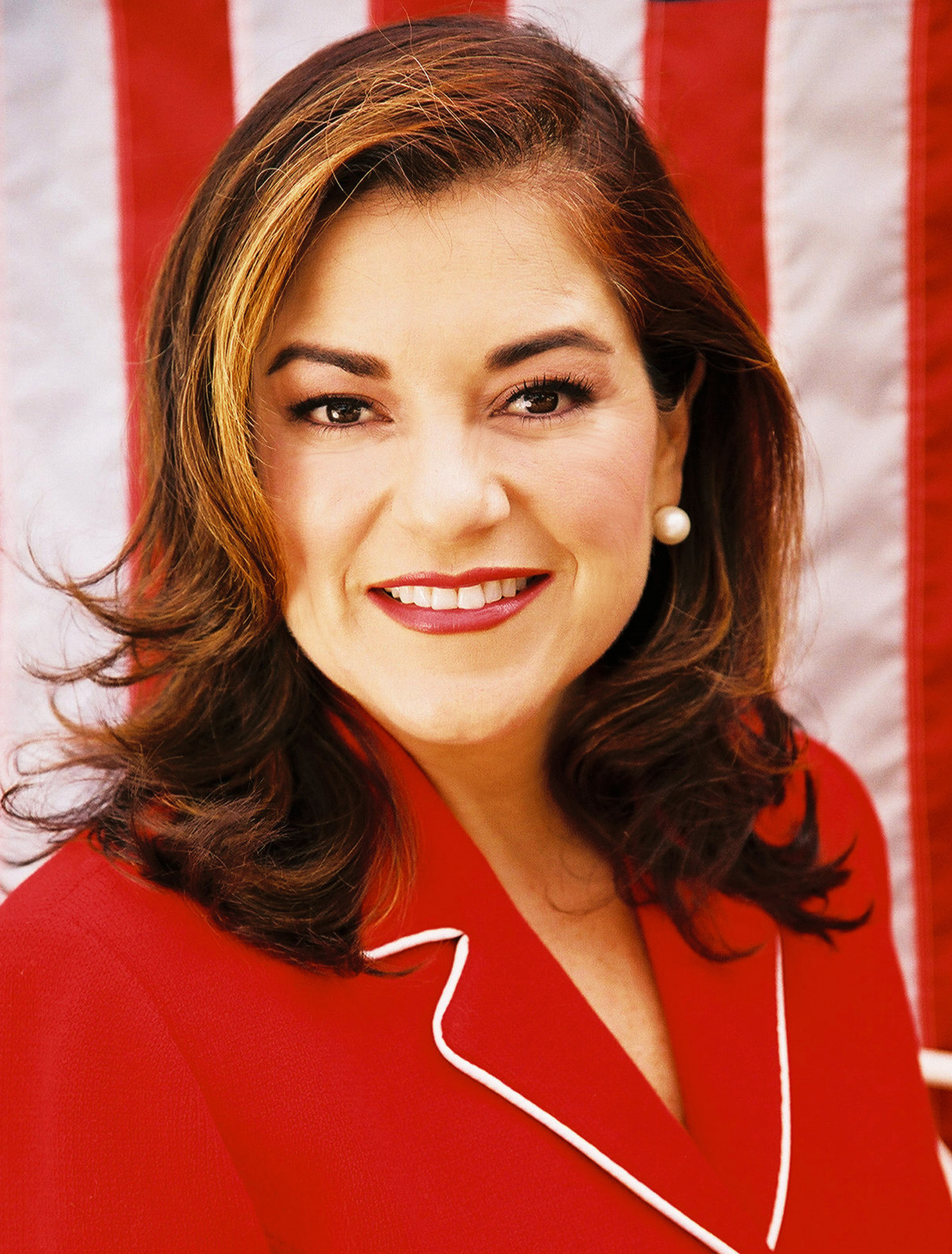
Candidate	Kamala Harris	Loretta Sanchez
Party	Democratic	Democratic
Popular vote	7,542,753	4,701,417
Percentage	61.60%	38.40%
- Harris: 50–60% 60–70% 70–80% 80–90% 90–100% Sanchez: 50–60% 60–70% 70–80% 80–90% 90–100%
U.S. senator before election
Barbara Boxer
Democratic
Elected U.S. Senator
Kamala Harris
Democratic

The 2016 United States Senate election in California was held on November 8, 2016, to elect a member of the United States Senate to represent the State of California, concurrently with the 2016 U.S. presidential election, elections to the United States Senate in other states, elections to the United States House of Representatives, and various state and local elections.

Under California's nonpartisan blanket primary law, all candidates appear on the same ballot, regardless of party. In the primary, voters may vote for any candidate, regardless of their party affiliation. In the California system, the top two finishers, regardless of party, advance to the general election in November, even if a candidate receives a majority of the vote in the primary election. Washington State and Louisiana have similar nonpartisan primary style processes for senators, though Louisiana will end its jungle system for specific offices, including senator, in 2026.

Incumbent Democratic Senator Barbara Boxer decided to not run for election to a fifth term.

This was the first open seat Senate election in California since 1992, when Boxer was first elected. In the primary on June 7, 2016, California Attorney General Kamala Harris and U.S. Representative Loretta Sanchez, both Democrats, finished in first and second place, respectively, and contested the general election. For the first time since direct elections to the Senate were mandated after the passage of the Seventeenth Amendment in 1913, no Republican appeared on the general election ballot for the U.S. Senate in California. The highest Republican finisher in the primary won only 7.8 percent of the vote, and the 10 Republicans only won 27.9 percent of the vote among them.

In the general election, Harris defeated Sanchez in a landslide, carrying 54 of the state's 58 counties, including Sanchez's home county of Orange, although Sanchez held Harris to a margin of less than 1% in the Central Valley counties of Kern and Merced.

Harris did not serve her full term in the Senate, as she resigned on January 18, 2021 after being elected vice president of the United States in 2020. Governor Gavin Newsom appointed Alex Padilla, the incumbent secretary of state of California, to serve the rest of her term.

== Background ==
Barbara Boxer was reelected with 52.1% of the vote in 2010 against Republican Carly Fiorina. Toward the end of 2014, Boxer's low fundraising and cash-on-hand numbers led to speculation that she would retire. On January 8, 2015, she announced that she would not run for reelection.

== Candidates ==
=== Democratic Party ===
==== Advanced to general ====
- Kamala Harris, attorney general of California
- Loretta Sanchez, U.S. representative

==== Eliminated in primary ====
- Cristina Grappo
- Massie Munroe, engineer
- Herbert G. Peters
- Emory Rodgers, activist
- Steve Stokes, small business owner and independent candidate for CA-28 in 2014

==== Withdrew ====
- Stewart Albertson, attorney

==== Declined ====
- Xavier Becerra, U.S. representative and candidate for mayor of Los Angeles in 2001
- Ami Bera, U.S. representative
- Barbara Boxer, incumbent U.S. senator
- Julia Brownley, U.S. representative
- Louis Caldera, former director of the White House Military Office, former United States secretary of the Army and former state assemblyman
- Tony Cárdenas, U.S. representative
- John Chiang, California state treasurer, former California state controller and former member of the State Board of Equalization
- Kevin de León, president pro tempore of the California State Senate
- John Garamendi, U.S. representative, former lieutenant governor of California, former California insurance commissioner and former deputy secretary of the interior
- Eric Garcetti, mayor of Los Angeles
- Jane Harman, director, president and CEO of the Woodrow Wilson International Center for Scholars, former U.S. representative and candidate for governor in 1998
- Jared Huffman, U.S. representative
- Kevin Johnson, mayor of Sacramento and former professional basketball player
- Sam Liccardo, mayor of San Jose
- Bill Lockyer, former California state treasurer and former attorney general of California
- Gloria Molina, former Los Angeles County supervisor
- Janet Napolitano, president of the University of California, former United States secretary of homeland security and former governor of Arizona
- Gavin Newsom, lieutenant governor of California and former mayor of San Francisco (running for governor in 2018)
- Alex Padilla, secretary of state of California, former state senator and future U.S. senator for this seat
- Raul Ruiz, U.S. representative
- Linda Sánchez, U.S. representative
- Sheryl Sandberg, COO of Facebook
- Adam Schiff, U.S. representative
- Hilda Solis, Los Angeles County supervisor, former United States secretary of labor and former U.S. representative
- Jackie Speier, U.S. representative and candidate for lieutenant governor in 2006
- Darrell Steinberg, former president pro tempore of the California State Senate
- Tom Steyer, hedge fund manager, philanthropist and environmentalist
- Eric Swalwell, U.S. representative
- Mark Takano, U.S. representative
- Ellen Tauscher, former under secretary of state for arms control and international security affairs and former U.S. representative
- Antonio Villaraigosa, former mayor of Los Angeles
- Steve Westly, former California state controller and candidate for governor in 2006 (running for governor in 2018)

==== Endorsements ====
Kamala Harris

Federal politicians

- Karen Bass, U.S. representative (D-CA-37)
- Ami Bera, U.S. representative (D-CA-7)
- Joe Biden, vice president of the United States
- Cory Booker, U.S. senator (D-NJ)
- Barbara Boxer, Outgoing U.S. senator (D-CA)
- Mark DeSaulnier, U.S. representative (D-CA-11)
- Dianne Feinstein, U.S. senator (D-CA)
- Kirsten Gillibrand, U.S. senator (D-NY)
- Mike Honda, U.S. representative (D-CA-17)
- Jared Huffman, U.S. representative (D-CA-2)
- Barbara Lee, U.S. representative (D-CA-13)
- Jerry McNerney, U.S. representative (D-CA-9)
- Barack Obama, president of the United States
- Eric Swalwell, U.S. representative (D-CA-15)
- Elizabeth Warren, U.S. senator (D-MA)

State officials

- Toni Atkins, speaker of the California State Assembly
- Jerry Brown, governor of California
- Willie Brown, former speaker of the California State Assembly and former mayor of San Francisco
- Kevin de León, president pro tempore of the California State Senate
- Ricardo Lara, California state senator (D-33)
- Fiona Ma, member of the California State Board of Equalization
- Jose Medina, California state assemblymember (D-61)
- Gavin Newsom, Lieutenant governor of California
- John Pérez, former speaker of the California State Assembly
- Darrell Steinberg, former president pro tempore of the California State Senate
- Betty Yee, California state controller and former member of the State Board of Equalization

Local officials

- Art Brown, mayor of Buena Park
- José Cisneros, treasurer of San Francisco
- Myrtle Cole, member of the San Diego City Council
- Cynthia Conners, mayor of Laguna Woods
- Jan Flory, member of the Fullerton City Council
- Robert Garcia, mayor of Long Beach
- Todd Gloria, member of the San Diego City Council
- Jill Hardy, mayor of Huntington Beach
- Dennis Herrera, city attorney of San Francisco
- Toni Iseman, member of the Laguna Beach City Council
- Dave Jones, California insurance commissioner and former state assemblyman
- Jackie Lacey, district attorney of Los Angeles County
- Ed Lee, mayor of San Francisco
- Sam Liccardo, mayor of San Jose
- Nancy O'Malley, district attorney of Alameda County
- Jeffrey Prang, assessor of Los Angeles County
- Lorraine Prinsky, president of the Coast Community College District Board of Trustees
- Libby Schaaf, mayor of Oakland
- Steve Shanahan, member of the La Palma City Council
- Arthur Torres, former chairman of the California Democratic Party
- Carol Warren, member of the Stanton City Council
- Herb Wesson, president of the Los Angeles City Council and former speaker of the California State Assembly

Organizations

- California Democratic Party
- California Professional Firefighters
- California Statewide Law Enforcement Association
- EMILY's List
- Los Angeles Police Protective League
Loretta Sanchez

Federal politicians

- Pete Aguilar, U.S. representative (D-CA-31)
- Tony Cárdenas, U.S. representative (D-CA-29)
- Judy Chu, U.S. representative (D-CA-27)
- Jim Costa, U.S. representative (D-CA-16)
- Susan Davis, U.S. representative (D-CA-53)
- Anna Eshoo, U.S. representative (D-CA-18)
- Sam Farr, U.S. representative (D-CA-20)
- Luis Gutierrez, U.S. representative (D-IL-4)
- Janice Hahn, U.S. representative (D-CA-44)
- Patrick J. Kennedy, former U.S. representative (D-RI)
- Alan Lowenthal, U.S. representative (D-CA-47)
- Buck McKeon, former U.S. representative (R-CA)
- Grace Napolitano, U.S. representative (D-CA-32)
- Scott Peters, U.S. representative (D-CA-52)
- Lucille Roybal-Allard, U.S. representative (D-CA-40)
- Raul Ruiz, U.S. representative (D-CA-36)
- Linda Sánchez, U.S. representative (D-CA-38)
- Mark Takano, U.S. representative (D-CA-41)
- Norma Torres, U.S. representative (D-CA-35)
- Juan Vargas, U.S. representative (D-CA-51)
- Filemon Bartolome Vela Jr., U.S. representative (D-TX-34)
- Nydia Velázquez, U.S. representative (D-NY-7)

State officials

- Luis Alejo, California state assemblymember (D-30)
- Cruz Bustamante, former lieutenant governor of California
- Ian Calderon, California state assemblymember (D-57)
- Lou Correa, former California state senator
- Denise Moreno Ducheny, former California state senator
- Cristina Garcia, California state assemblymember (D-58)
- Eduardo Garcia, California state assemblymember (D-56)
- Lorena Gonzalez, California state assemblymember (D-80)
- Ed Hernandez, California state senator (D-22)
- Patty López, California state assemblymember (D-39)
- Sharon Quirk-Silva, former California state assemblymember
- Sarah Reyes, former California state assemblymember
- Freddie Rodriguez, California state assemblymember (D-52)

Local officials

- David Alvarez, member of the San Diego City Council
- Jordan Brandman, member of the Anaheim City Council
- David Cardenas, mayor of Fowler
- Fernando Dutra, mayor of Whittier
- Paul Koretz, member of the Los Angeles City Council
- Victor Lopez, mayor of Orange Cove
- Victor Manalo, mayor of Artesia
- Cristian Markovich, mayor of Cudahy
- Kyle Miller, mayor of La Habra
- Jorge Morales, mayor of South Gate
- Daniel Parra, mayor pro tem of Fowler and candidate for CA-21 in 2016
- Jhonny Pineda, mayor of Huntington Park
- Miguel A. Pulido, mayor of Santa Ana
- Richard Riordan, former mayor of Los Angeles
- Scott Robertson, mayor of Selma
- Robert Silva, mayor of Mendota
- Rick Tuttle, former Los Angeles city controller

Organizations

- International Organization of Masters, Mates & Pilots
- Marine Engineers' Beneficial Association
- National Women's Political Caucus
- Orange County Employees Association
- Sailors Union of the Pacific

=== Republican Party ===
==== Eliminated in primary ====
- Greg Conlon, businessman
- Tom Del Beccaro, former chairman of the California Republican Party
- Von Hougo, educator
- Don Krampe, retiree and candidate for the U.S. Senate in 2012
- Jerry J. Laws
- Tom Palzer, former city planner
- Karen Roseberry, educator
- George "Duf" Sundheim, former chairman of the California Republican Party
- Ron Unz, activist and candidate for governor in 1994
- Jarrell Williamson, attorney
- Phil Wyman, former state senator, former state assemblyman, candidate for CA-25 in 1992 and candidate for attorney general in 2014
- George C. Yang, businessman

==== Withdrew ====
- Rocky Chávez, state assemblyman (running for re-election)

==== Declined ====
- Mary Bono, former U.S. representative
- Tom Campbell, former U.S. representative, nominee for the U.S. Senate in 2000 and candidate for the U.S. Senate in 1992 and 2010
- Carl DeMaio, former San Diego City Council member, candidate for mayor of San Diego in 2012 and candidate for California's 52nd congressional district in 2014
- Tim Donnelly, former state assemblyman, Minuteman founder and candidate for governor in 2014 (running for CA-08)
- David Dreier, former U.S. representative
- Larry Elder, talk radio host and attorney
- Kevin Faulconer, mayor of San Diego
- Carly Fiorina, businesswoman and nominee for the U.S. Senate in 2010 (running for president)
- Darrell Issa, U.S. representative and candidate for the U.S. Senate in 1998
- Ernie Konnyu, former U.S. representative and former state assemblyman
- Abel Maldonado, former lieutenant governor of California, candidate for California state controller in 2006, for CA-24 in 2012 and for governor in 2014
- Kevin McCarthy, U.S. representative and House majority leader
- Doug Ose, former U.S. representative
- Pete Peterson, executive director of the Davenport Institute for Public Engagement at Pepperdine University and candidate for secretary of state of California in 2014
- Steve Poizner, former California insurance commissioner and candidate for governor in 2010
- Condoleezza Rice, former United States secretary of state, former U.S. national security advisor and former provost of Stanford University
- Ed Royce, U.S. representative
- Arnold Schwarzenegger, actor and former governor of California
- Ashley Swearengin, mayor of Fresno and candidate for California state controller in 2014
- Meg Whitman, president and CEO of Hewlett-Packard and nominee for governor in 2010

==== Endorsements ====
Rocky Chávez

State politicians

- Katcho Achadjian, state assemblyman, former San Luis Obispo County supervisor and candidate for CA-24 in 2016
- Travis Allen, state assemblyman
- Frank Bigelow, state assemblyman and former Madera County supervisor
- Brian Dahle, state assemblyman and former Lassen County supervisor
- Kevin Faulconer, mayor of San Diego
- Beth Gaines, state assemblywoman
- James Gallagher, state assemblyman and former Sutter County supervisor
- David Hadley, state assemblyman
- Matthew Harper, state assemblyman and former mayor of Huntington Beach
- Neel Kashkari, former assistant secretary of the treasury for financial stability and candidate for governor of California in 2014
- Young Kim, state assemblywoman
- Tom Lackey, state assemblyman and former Palmdale city councilman
- Eric Linder, state assemblyman
- Brian Maienschein, state assemblyman and former San Diego city councilman
- Devon Mathis, state assemblyman
- Chad Mayes, state assemblyman and former Yucca Valley town councilman
- Melissa Melendez, state assemblywoman and former Lake Elsinore city councilwoman
- Jay Obernolte, state assemblyman and former mayor of Big Bear Lake
- Kristin Olsen, minority leader of the California State Assembly
- Jim Patterson, state assemblyman and former mayor of Fresno
- Marc Steinorth, state assemblyman and former Rancho Cucamonga city councilman
- Donald P. Wagner, state assemblyman
- Marie Waldron, state assemblywoman and former Escondido city councilwoman
- Scott Wilk, state assemblyman

Organizations

- Deputy Sheriff's Association of San Diego County
Duf Sundheim

Federal politicians

- Paul Cook, U.S. representative (R-CA)
- Darrell Issa, U.S. representative (R-CA)
- Kevin McCarthy, U.S. House majority leader (R-CA)
- George Shultz, former U.S. secretary of state
- Mimi Walters, U.S. representative (R-CA)

State politicians

- Gino Borgioli, Morgan Hill School Board member
- Rocky Chávez, California State Assemblyman
- Rex Bohn, Humboldt County supervisor
- Jean Fuller, California Senate minority leader
- Johnny Khamis, San Jose city councilman
- Rich Kinney, mayor of San Pablo
- Ashley Swearengin, mayor of Fresno
- Acquanetta Warren, mayor of Fontana

Businesspeople

- John Chambers, Cisco Systems executive chairman

Organizations

- California Small Business Association
Tom Del Beccaro

Individuals

- Joel Anderson, California state senator
- Michael D. Antonovich, Los Angeles County supervisor
- Nathan Black, Sutter County auditor-controller
- Ward Connerly, founder and chairman of the American Civil Rights Institute
- Carl DeMaio, former San Diego City Council member
- John C. Eastman, constitutional scholar
- Rick Farinelli, Madera County supervisor
- Dan Flores, Sutter County supervisor
- Steve Forbes, former Republican presidential candidate and editor-in-chief of Forbes
- Matthew Harper, California state assemblyman
- John S. Herrington, former U.S. secretary of energy
- Larry Kudlow, economist and newspaper columnist
- Arthur Laffer, economist
- Marshall Long, Mariposa County supervisor
- Tom McClintock, U.S. representative (R-CA)
- Jeff Miller, former California state assemblyman
- Stephen Moore, economics writer, founder and former president of Club for Growth
- Walid Phares, Lebanese-born American professor at the National Defense University and Daniel Morgan Academy in Washington
- Mary Piepho, Contra Costa County supervisor
- Anthony Ribera, former San Francisco Police chief
- George Runner, member of the California State Board of Equalization
- Sharon Runner, California state senator
- Joseph Russoniello, former U.S. attorney for the Northern District of California
- Rick Santorum, former U.S. senator (R-PA)
- Ben Shapiro, political commentator and author
- Bill Simon, Republican Party nominee for governor of California in 2002
- Ron Sullenger, Sutter County supervisor
- Paul E. Vallely, retired US Army major general
- Ignacio Velazquez, mayor of Hollister

Organizations

- American Independent Party
- California Republican Assembly
- Howard Jarvis Taxpayers Association

=== Green Party ===
==== Declared ====
- Pamela Elizondo

=== Libertarian Party ===
==== Declared ====
- Mark Matthew Herd, community organizer
- Gail Lightfoot, retired nurse and perennial candidate

=== Peace and Freedom Party ===
==== Declared ====
- John Thompson Parker

=== Independent ===
==== Declared ====
- Mikelis Beitiks, climate change activist
- Eleanor Garcia, factory worker
- Tim Gildersleeve
- Clive Grey
- Don Grundmann, chiropractor, chairman of the Constitution Party of California, and perennial candidate (also sought the Constitution Party nomination for president of the United States)
- Jason Hanania, attorney and engineer
- Jason Kraus
- Paul Merritt
- Gar Myers
- Ling Ling Shi, author
- Scott A. Vineberg

==== Declined ====
- Angelina Jolie, actress, filmmaker and former goodwill ambassador for the United Nations High Commissioner for Refugees

== Primary election ==
=== Fundraising ===
The following are Federal Election Commission disclosures through the reporting period ending March 31, 2016.

Candidate (party)	Receipts	Disbursements	Cash on hand	Debt
Kamala Harris (D)	$9,749,024	$4,759,048	$4,989,977	$78,900
Loretta Sánchez (D)	$3,251,186	$921,291	$2,329,895	$209,217
Tom Del Beccaro (R)	$316,560	$238,612	$77,946	$74,465
George 'Duf' Sundheim (R)	$532,638	$475,415	$57,222	$181,640
Phillip Wyman (R)	$48,900	$11,761	$30,737	$40,000
Clive Grey (NPP)	$38,916	$21,554	$17,361	$25,000
Greg Conlon (R)	$21,205	$13,396	$7,809	$9,575
Mike Beitiks (NPP)	$6,305	$4,860	$1,444	$0
Steve Stokes (D)	$4,864	$4,351	$762	$4,742
Emory Rodgers (D)	$7,246	$6,988	$290	$0
Tom Palzer (R)	$2,783	$2,442	$241	$0

=== Polling ===
Poll source	Date(s) administered	Sample size	Margin of error	Tom Del Beccaro (R)	Kamala Harris (D)	Loretta Sánchez (D)	Duf Sundheim (R)	Ron Unz (R)	Other	Undecided
Marist College	May 29–31, 2016	2,485	± 2.3%	8%	37%	19%	5%	5%	3%	24%
The Field Poll	May 26–31, 2016	1,002	± 3.1%	4%	30%	14%	3%	3%	19%	27%
Public Policy Institute of California	May 13–22, 2016	996	± 4.3%	8%	27%	19%	3%	6%	—	22%
SurveyUSA	May 19–22, 2016	1,416	± 2.7%	9%	31%	22%	9%	7%	7%	15%
Public Policy Institute of California	May 13–22, 2016	996	± 4.3%	8%	27%	19%	3%	6%	6%	31%
Hoover Institution	May 4–16, 2016	1,196	–	6%	26%	13%	6%	6%	–	43%
SurveyUSA	April 27–30, 2016	2,400	± 2.6%	10%	29%	18%	7%	8%	6%	22%
SurveyUSA	March 30 – April 3, 2016	1,269	± 2.8%	8%	26%	22%	5%	–	7%	24%
The Field Poll	March 24 – April 4, 2016	1,400	± 3.2%	4%	27%	14%	2%	5%	–	48%
Los Angeles Times	March 16–23, 2016	691	–	10%	33%	15%	8%	–	–	34%
Public Policy Institute of California	March 6–15, 2016	1,710	± 3.6%	9%	26%	17%	6%	–	11%	31%
The Field Poll	December 15, 2015 – January 3, 2016	730	± 3.6%	3%	27%	15%	3%	–	1%	44%
The Field Poll	September 17 – October 4, 2015	694	± 4.3%	6%	30%	17%	3%	–	1%	34%
Los Angeles Times	August 29 – September 8, 2015	1,500	± 2.8%	10%	26%	17%	–	–	–	35%
The Field Poll	April 23 – May 16, 2015	801	± 3.5%	5%	19%	8%	1%	–	–	58%

Hypothetical polling

Poll source	Date(s) administered	Sample size	Margin of error	Rocky Chavez (R)	David Dreier (R)	John Estrada (R)	Kamala Harris (D)	Adam Schiff (D)	Ashley Swearengin (R)	Meg Whitman (R)	Other	Unde- cided
Emerson College	April 2–8, 2015	881	± 3.2%	9%	1%	1%	23%	2%	4%	13%	7%	41%

Poll source	Date(s) administered	Sample size	Margin of error	Rocky Chavez (R)	Del Beccaro/ Sundheim (R)	Kamala Harris (D)	Adam Schiff (D)	Ashley Swearengin (R)	Antonio Villaraigosa (D)	Other	Undecided
USC	February 18–24, 2015	1,505	± 2.7%	6%	5.5%	28%	5%	9%	19%	2%	27%

Poll source	Date(s) administered	Sample size	Margin of error	Mary Bono (R)	David Dreier (R)	Kamala Harris (D)	Adam Schiff (D)	Antonio Villaraigosa (D)	Undecided
Public Policy Polling (D)	February 6–8, 2015	824	± ?	14%	19%	34%	4%	16%	14%

Poll source	Date(s) administered	Sample size	Margin of error	Kamala Harris (D)	Adam Schiff (D)	Ashley Swearengin (R)	Antonio Villaraigosa (D)	Undecided
Garin-Hart-Yang Research	January 27–29, 2015	600	± 4	28%	4%	31%	18%	19%

Poll source	Date(s) administered	Sample size	Margin of error	Xavier Becerra (D)	Rocky Chavez (R)	Kamala Harris (D)	Condoleezza Rice (R)	Loretta Sanchez (D)	Antonio Villaraigosa (D)	Undecided
Public Policy Polling (D)	January 22, 2015	627	± ?	3%	2%	34%	33%	4%	9%	15%

Poll source	Date(s) administered	Sample size	Margin of error	Eric Garcetti (D)	Kamala Harris (D)	Neel Kashkari (R)	Tom McClintock (R)	Linda Sánchez (D)	Jackie Speier (D)	Tom Steyer (D)	Undecided
Public Policy Polling (D)	December 29–30, 2014	401	± ?	7%	27%	12%	28%	6%	—	6%	14%
Public Policy Polling (D)	December 29–30, 2014	468	± ?	—	22%	12%	29%	8%	8%	4%	17%

=== Results ===
Results of the primary election held June 7: Harris: 10–20%; 20–30%; 30–40%; 40–50%; 50–60%; 60–70%; 70–80%; Sanchez: 10–20%; 20–30%; 30–40%; Wyman: 10–20%; 20–30%

Primary results
Party	Candidate	Votes	%
Democratic	Kamala Harris	3,000,689	37.9%
Democratic	Loretta Sanchez	1,416,203	17.9%
Republican	Duf Sundheim	584,251	7.8%
Republican	Phil Wyman	352,821	4.7%
Republican	Tom Del Beccaro	323,614	4.3%
Republican	Greg Conlon	230,944	3.1%
Democratic	Steve Stokes	168,805	2.2%
Republican	George C. Yang	112,055	1.5%
Republican	Karen Roseberry	110,557	1.5%
Libertarian	Gail K. Lightfoot	99,761	1.3%
Democratic	Massie Munroe	98,150	1.3%
Green	Pamela Elizondo	95,677	1.3%
Republican	Tom Palzer	93,263	1.2%
Republican	Ron Unz	92,325	1.2%
Republican	Don Krampe	69,635	0.9%
No party preference	Eleanor García	65,084	0.9%
Republican	Jarrell Williamson	64,120	0.9%
Republican	Von Hougo	63,609	0.8%
Democratic	President Cristina Grappo	63,330	0.8%
Republican	Jerry J. Laws	53,023	0.7%
Libertarian	Mark Matthew Herd	41,344	0.6%
Peace and Freedom	John Thompson Parker	35,998	0.5%
No party preference	Ling Ling Shi	35,196	0.5%
Democratic	Herbert G. Peters	32,638	0.4%
Democratic	Emory Peretz Rodgers	31,485	0.4%
No party preference	Mike Beitiks	31,450	0.4%
No party preference	Clive Grey	29,418	0.4%
No party preference	Jason Hanania	27,715	0.4%
No party preference	Paul Merritt	24,031	0.3%
No party preference	Jason Kraus	19,318	0.3%
No party preference	Don J. Grundmann	15,317	0.2%
No party preference	Scott A. Vineberg	11,843	0.2%
No party preference	Tim Gildersleeve	9,798	0.1%
No party preference	Gar Myers	8,726	0.1%
Republican	Billy Falling (write-in)	87	0.0%
No party preference	Ric M. Llewellyn (write-in)	32	0.0%
Republican	Alexis Stuart (write-in)	10	0.0%
Total votes		7,512,322	100.0%

== General election ==
=== Fundraising ===
The following are Federal Election Commission disclosures through the reporting period ending March 31, 2016.

Candidate (party)	Receipts	Disbursements	Cash on hand	Debt
Kamala Harris (D)	$9,749,024	$4,759,048	$4,989,977	$78,900
Loretta Sánchez (D)	$3,251,186	$921,291	$2,329,895	$209,217

=== Debates ===
Dates	Location	Harris	Sanchez	Link
October 9, 2016	Cal State LA, Los Angeles, California	Participant	Participant	

=== Predictions ===
Source	Ranking	As of
The Cook Political Report	Safe D (Harris)	September 9, 2016
Sabato's Crystal Ball	Safe D (Harris)	September 19, 2016
Rothenberg Political Report	Safe D (Harris)	September 2, 2016
Daily Kos	Safe D (Harris)	September 16, 2016
Real Clear Politics	Safe D (Harris)	September 15, 2016

=== Polling ===
View source data.

Poll source	Date(s) administered	Sample size	Margin of error	Kamala Harris (D)	Loretta Sánchez (D)	Would not vote	Undecided
SurveyMonkey	November 1–7, 2016	2,712	± 4.6%	52%	31%	—	17%
Insights West	November 4–6, 2016	401	± 4.9%	50%	28%	—	22%
SurveyMonkey	Oct 31 – Nov 6, 2016	2,655	± 4.6%	51%	32%	—	17%
SurveyMonkey	Oct 28 – Nov 3, 2016	2,528	± 4.6%	51%	31%	—	18%
SurveyMonkey	Oct 27 – Nov 2, 2016	2,316	± 4.6%	51%	31%	—	18%
SurveyMonkey	Oct 26 – Nov 1, 2016	2,284	± 4.6%	51%	30%	—	19%
SurveyUSA	October 28–31, 2016	747	± 3.7%	47%	27%	—	26%
SurveyMonkey	October 25–31, 2016	2,505	± 4.6%	50%	30%	—	20%
The Field Poll	October 25–31, 2016	1,498	± 3.2%	47%	23%	13%	17%
USC Dornsife/Los Angeles Times	October 22–30, 2016	697	± 3.7%	48%	31%	9%	12%
PPIC Statewide Survey	October 14–23, 2016	1,024	± 4.3%	42%	20%	18%	20%
SurveyUSA	October 13–15, 2016	725	± 3.7%	45%	24%	—	31%
Hoover Institution – Golden State Poll	October 4–14, 2016	1,228	± 3.3%	41%	22%	—	37%
Sacramento State/CA Counts	October 7–13, 2016	622	± 7.0%	49%	24%	7%	20%
SurveyUSA	September 27–28, 2016	751	± 3.6%	40%	29%	—	31%
PPIC Statewide Survey	September 9–18, 2016	1,702	± 3.5%	32%	25%	24%	19%
Insights West	September 12–14, 2016	515	± 4.3%	42%	28%	3%	28%
The Field Poll	September 7–13, 2016	1,426	± 3.2%	42%	20%	12%	26%
SurveyUSA	September 8–11, 2016	712	± 3.7%	44%	27%	—	29%
SurveyMonkey USC/Los Angeles Times	September 1–8, 2016	4,212	± 2.0%	30%	16%	16%	38%
Sacramento State/CA Counts	August 15–24, 2016	915	± 4.0%	51%	19%	6%	25%
SmithJohnson Research	August 17–19, 2016	500	± 4.4%	41%	15%	8%	36%
PPIC Statewide Survey	July 10–19, 2016	1,056	± 3.5%	38%	20%	28%	14%
The Field Poll	June 8 – July 2, 2016	956	± 3.2%	39%	24%	15%	22%
SurveyMonkey USC/Los Angeles Times	June 9–10, 2016	1,553	± 3.5%	47%	22%	26%	5%
The Field Poll	May 26–31, 2016	1,002	± 3.1%	40%	26%	14%	20%
PPIC Statewide Survey	May 13–22, 2016	996	± 4.3%	34%	26%	24%	15%
Gravis Marketing	April 7–10, 2016	2,088	± 2.1%	29%	19%	—	52%

Hypothetical polling

Poll source	Date(s) administered	Sample size	Margin of error	Kamala Harris (D)	David Dreier (R)	Other	Undecided
Public Policy Polling	February 6–8, 2015	824	± ?	47%	42%	—	10%

Poll source	Date(s) administered	Sample size	Margin of error	Eric Garcetti (D)	Kamala Harris (D)	Other	Undecided
Public Policy Polling	December 29–30, 2014	869	± ?	20%	35%	—	46%

Poll source	Date(s) administered	Sample size	Margin of error	Kamala Harris (D)	Antonio Villaraigosa (D)	Other	Undecided
USC	February 18–24, 2015	1,505	± 2.7%	45%	27%	3%	24%
Public Policy Polling	February 6–8, 2015	824	± ?	45%	23%	—	33%
Public Policy Polling	January 22, 2015	627	± ?	41%	16%	—	43%

Poll source	Date(s) administered	Sample size	Margin of error	Adam Schiff (D)	David Dreier (R)	Other	Undecided
Public Policy Polling	February 6–8, 2015	824	± ?	43%	42%	—	15%

Poll source	Date(s) administered	Sample size	Margin of error	Antonio Villaraigosa (D)	David Dreier (R)	Other	Undecided
Public Policy Polling	February 6–8, 2015	824	± ?	46%	44%	—	10%

=== Results ===
2016 United States Senate election in California
Party	Candidate	Votes	%
Democratic	Kamala Harris	7,542,753	61.60%
Democratic	Loretta Sanchez	4,701,417	38.40%
Total votes		12,244,170	100.00%
Democratic hold			

==== By county ====
Blue represents counties won by Harris. Cyan represents counties won by Sanchez.

County	Harris #	Harris %	Sanchez #	Sanchez %	Margin #	Margin %	Total
Alameda	443,536	75.47	144,134	24.53	299,302	50.93	587,670
Alpine	342	72.00	133	28.00	209	44.00	475
Amador	8,690	64.08	4,872	35.92	3,818	28.15	13,562
Butte	43,491	58.64	30,680	41.36	12,811	17.27	74,171
Calaveras	11,259	64.11	6,302	35.89	4,957	28.23	17,561
Colusa	2,639	51.33	2,502	48.67	137	2.66	5,141
Contra Costa	282,587	69.38	124,731	30.62	157,856	38.75	407,318
Del Norte	4,603	61.03	2,939	38.97	1,664	22.06	7,542
El Dorado	45,671	63.36	26,408	36.64	19,263	26.72	72,079
Fresno	117,956	49.96	118,148	50.04	-192	-0.08	236,104
Glenn	3,423	47.44	3,793	52.56	-370	-5.13	7,216
Humboldt	32,729	66.79	16,277	33.21	16,452	33.57	49,006
Imperial	13,975	32.62	28,872	67.38	-14,897	-34.77	42,847
Inyo	3,863	63.11	2,258	36.89	1,605	26.22	6,121
Kern	98,526	50.21	97,689	49.79	837	0.43	196,215
Kings	14,655	52.69	13,158	47.31	1,497	5.38	27,813
Lake	13,188	65.32	7,003	34.68	6,185	30.63	20,191
Lassen	4,151	56.27	3,226	43.73	925	12.54	7,377
Los Angeles	1,895,675	60.88	1,218,236	39.12	677,439	21.76	3,113,911
Madera	16,769	48.85	17,562	51.15	-793	-2.31	34,331
Marin	98,196	78.37	27,101	21.63	71,095	56.74	125,297
Mariposa	4,134	62.14	2,519	37.86	1,615	24.27	6,653
Mendocino	22,335	70.02	9,564	29.98	12,771	40.04	31,899
Merced	30,172	50.28	29,835	49.72	337	0.56	60,007
Modoc	1,531	59.46	1,044	40.54	487	18.91	2,575
Mono	2,611	62.14	1,591	37.86	1,020	24.27	4,202
Monterey	77,659	64.33	43,060	35.67	34,599	28.66	120,719
Napa	35,925	66.90	17,778	33.10	18,147	33.79	53,703
Nevada	29,639	68.98	13,329	31.02	16,310	37.96	42,968
Orange	555,459	53.29	486,783	46.71	68,676	6.59	1,042,242
Placer	89,687	63.21	52,192	36.79	37,495	26.43	141,879
Plumas	4,606	65.58	2,418	34.42	2,188	31.15	7,024
Riverside	339,497	54.68	281,437	45.32	58,060	9.35	620,934
Sacramento	312,038	65.87	161,673	34.13	150,365	31.74	473,711
San Benito	11,151	59.57	7,568	40.43	3,583	19.14	18,719
San Bernardino	300,738	54.48	251,246	45.52	49,492	8.97	551,984
San Diego	625,843	58.39	446,063	41.61	179,780	16.77	1,071,906
San Francisco	286,723	77.98	80,985	22.02	205,738	55.95	367,708
San Joaquin	111,563	57.85	81,295	42.15	30,268	15.69	192,858
San Luis Obispo	69,190	64.88	37,455	35.12	31,735	29.76	106,645
San Mateo	199,956	71.15	81,090	28.85	118,866	42.29	281,046
Santa Barbara	88,861	59.30	60,995	40.70	27,866	18.60	149,856
Santa Clara	411,765	66.51	207,380	33.49	204,385	33.01	619,145
Santa Cruz	81,443	71.34	32,720	28.66	48,723	42.68	114,163
Shasta	31,877	56.67	24,369	43.33	7,508	13.35	56,246
Sierra	826	65.14	442	34.86	384	30.28	1,268
Siskiyou	8,744	57.52	6,457	42.48	2,287	15.05	15,201
Solano	97,410	66.43	49,229	33.57	48,181	32.86	146,639
Sonoma	147,532	72.99	54,600	27.01	92,932	45.98	202,132
Stanislaus	80,502	56.80	61,219	43.20	19,283	13.61	141,721
Sutter	15,191	56.49	11,700	43.51	3,491	12.98	26,891
Tehama	9,456	54.20	7,991	45.80	1,465	8.40	17,447
Trinity	2,696	60.03	1,795	39.97	901	20.06	4,491
Tulare	47,145	51.70	44,044	48.30	3,101	3.40	91,189
Tuolumne	12,239	65.86	6,345	34.14	5,894	31.72	18,584
Ventura	181,785	61.05	115,964	38.95	65,821	22.11	297,749
Yolo	48,901	67.61	23,429	32.39	25,472	35.22	72,330
Yuba	9,999	56.21	7,789	43.79	2,210	12.42	17,788
Totals	7,542,753	61.60	4,701,417	38.40	2,841,336	23.21	12,244,170

==== By congressional district ====
Harris won 47 of the 53 congressional districts, including thirteen held by Republicans. Sanchez won six, including one held by a Republican.

District	Harris	Sanchez	Representative
1st	60%	40%	Doug LaMalfa
2nd	74%	26%	Jared Huffman
3rd	62%	38%	John Garamendi
4th	63%	37%	Tom McClintock
5th	70%	30%	Mike Thompson
6th	67%	33%	Doris Matsui
7th	65%	35%	Ami Bera
8th	55%	45%	Paul Cook
9th	59%	41%	Jerry McNerney
10th	57%	43%	Jeff Denham
11th	71%	29%	Mark DeSaulnier
12th	79%	21%	Nancy Pelosi
13th	81%	19%	Barbara Lee
14th	71%	29%	Jackie Speier
15th	70%	30%	Eric Swalwell
16th	49%	51%	Jim Costa
17th	68%	32%	Mike Honda
17th	68%	32%	Ro Khanna
18th	74%	26%	Anna Eshoo
19th	59%	41%	Zoe Lofgren
20th	66%	34%	Sam Farr
20th	66%	34%	Jimmy Panetta
21st	43%	57%	David Valadao
22nd	53%	47%	Devin Nunes
23rd	54%	46%	Kevin McCarthy
24th	62%	38%	Lois Capps
24th	62%	38%	Salud Carbajal
25th	60%	40%	Steve Knight
26th	61%	39%	Julia Brownley
27th	62%	38%	Judy Chu
28th	66%	34%	Adam Schiff
29th	53%	47%	Tony Cárdenas
30th	66%	34%	Brad Sherman
31st	57%	43%	Pete Aguilar
32nd	51%	49%	Grace Napolitano
33rd	71%	29%	Ted Lieu
34th	55%	45%	Xavier Becerra
35th	50.2%	49.8%	Norma Torres
36th	56%	44%	Raul Ruiz
37th	74%	26%	Karen Bass
38th	49%	51%	Linda Sánchez
39th	54%	46%	Ed Royce
40th	44%	56%	Lucille Roybal-Allard
41st	53%	47%	Mark Takano
42nd	55%	45%	Ken Calvert
43rd	67%	33%	Maxine Waters
44th	55%	45%	Janice Hahn
44th	55%	45%	Nanette Barragán
45th	59%	41%	Mimi Walters
46th	41%	59%	Loretta Sánchez
46th	41%	59%	Lou Correa
47th	58%	42%	Alan Lowenthal
48th	56%	44%	Dana Rohrabacher
49th	60%	40%	Darrell Issa
50th	55%	45%	Duncan Hunter
51st	43%	57%	Juan Vargas
52nd	64%	36%	Scott Peters
53rd	60%	40%	Susan Davis

== Analysis ==
This election was the first, and, as of August 2025, the only US Senate election in which two Democratic women of color faced each other in a general election. It is also one of only two United States Senate elections in California in which both general election candidates were Democrats, the other being the election between former Senator Dianne Feinstein and then-California State Senator Kevin de León in 2018.

Later, after her victory in the 2020 election as the running mate of former President Joe Biden, Harris resigned from the Senate on January 18, 2021, two days before her inauguration as vice president. This makes Harris the first US senator elected to a full six-year term since Barack Obama in 2008 to not finish what would be her sole term. On December 22, 2020, California Governor Gavin Newsom appointed California Secretary of State Alex Padilla to serve the remainder of Harris' term. Harris became President of the Senate on January 20, 2021, by virtue of her election as vice president.

Harris is the second incumbent US senator from this seat to be elected vice president, the first being Richard Nixon in 1952.

== See also ==
- 2016 United States Senate elections
