= 2022 California State Controller election =

- November 8, 2022
- Registered: 21,940,274
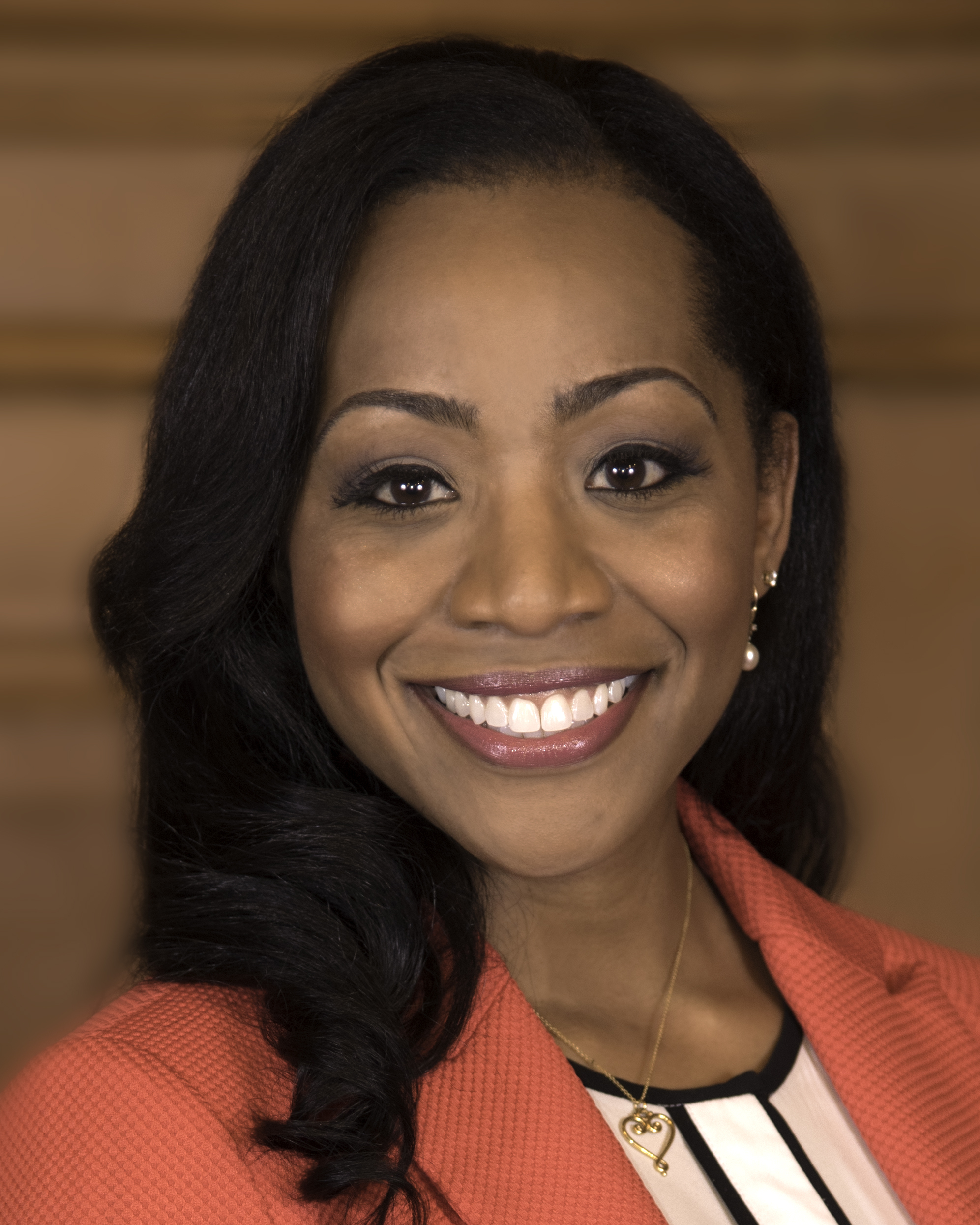

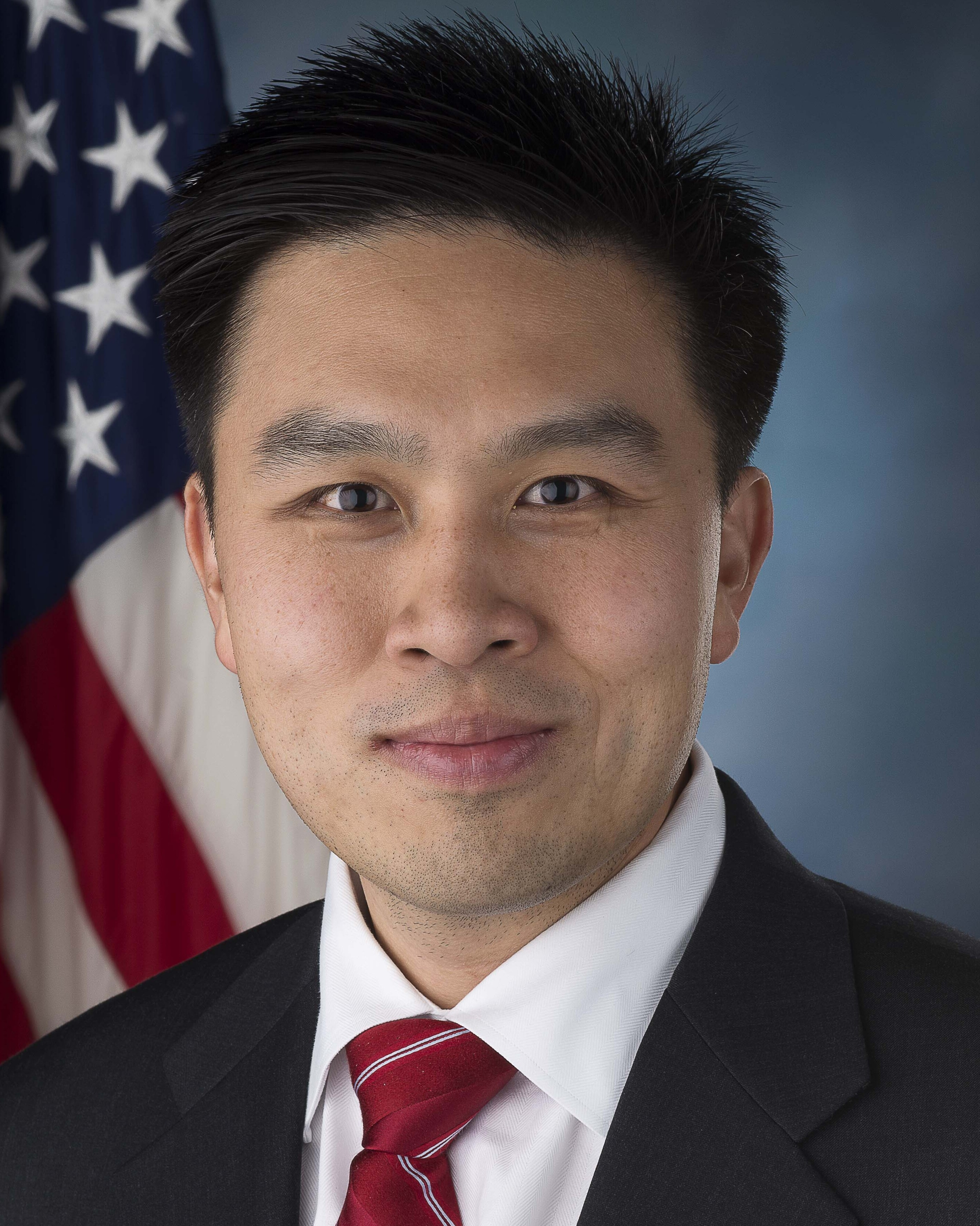
Candidate	Malia Cohen	Lanhee Chen
Party	Democratic	Republican
Popular vote	5,936,856	4,789,345
Percentage	55.35%	44.65%
- Cohen: 50–60% 60–70% 70–80% 80–90% Chen: 50–60% 60–70% 70–80% 80–90%
Controller before election
Betty Yee
Democratic
Elected Controller
Malia Cohen
Democratic

The 2022 California State Controller election was held on November 8, 2022, to elect the California State Controller. Due to strict absolute lifetime term limit laws, incumbent Democratic State Controller Betty Yee was ineligible to run for a third term. Democrat Malia Cohen won the election, defeating Republican Lanhee Chen. Despite Chen's loss, the race was the closest of the 2022 elections in California, and Chen received more votes than any Republican candidate in the 2022 national election cycle. Chen flipped ten counties, (Note: Butte, Fresno, Lake, Merced, Orange, Riverside, San Bernardino, San Joaquin, San Luis Obispo, and Stanislaus) the most that any candidate had flipped in California that year. Chen also won four congressional districts held by Democrats, (Note: CA-21, CA-09, CA-47, and CA-49) while Cohen won no congressional districts held by Republicans.

== Candidates ==
=== Democratic Party ===
==== Advanced to general election ====
- Malia Cohen, Chair of the California State Board of Equalization and former President of the San Francisco Board of Supervisors (2018–2019)

==== Eliminated in primary ====
- Ron Galperin, Los Angeles City Controller
- Steve Glazer, state senator from the 7th district
- Yvonne Yiu, mayor of Monterey Park

=== Republican Party ===
==== Advanced to general election ====
- Lanhee Chen, Stanford University professor, former advisor to the NRSC, former policy advisor for Mitt Romney's 2012 presidential campaign and Marco Rubio's 2016 presidential campaign

=== Green Party ===
==== Eliminated in primary ====
- Laura Wells, financial and business analyst and perennial candidate

== Endorsements ==
Malia Cohen (D)

United States Senators

- Dianne Feinstein (D-CA)

United States Representatives

- Karen Bass (D-CA-37), candidate in the 2022 Los Angeles mayoral election
- Nancy Pelosi (D-CA-12), Speaker of the House

Statewide officials

- Betty Yee, incumbent California State Controller

Newspapers and other media

- Bay Area Reporter
- San Francisco Examiner (co-endorsed with Glazer)

Organizations

- AFSCME California (American Federation of State, County and Municipal Employees)
- Equality California (previously endorsed Galperin)
- California Democratic Party
- California Faculty Association
- California Federation of Teachers
- California Teachers Association
- Courage California
- NARAL Pro-Choice California
Lanhee Chen (R)

United States Senators

- Tom Cotton (R-AR)
- Joe Lieberman (Democratic) former senator from Connecticut, vice presidential nominee in 2000
- Mitt Romney (R-UT)
- Marco Rubio (R-FL)

United States Representatives

- Ken Calvert (R-CA-42)
- Darrell Issa (R-CA-50)
- Young Kim (R-CA-39)
- Kevin McCarthy (R-CA-23), House Minority Leader (2019–2023)
- Jay Obernolte (R-CA-08)
- Michelle Steel (R-CA-48)
- David Valadao (R-CA-21)

Former United States Representatives

- Devin Nunes (R-CA-22)
- Paul Ryan (R-WI-01)

Statewide officials

- Larry Hogan, Governor of Maryland
- Arnold Schwarzenegger, former governor of California

District attorneys

- Anne Marie Schubert, Sacramento County district attorney

California state legislators

- Patricia Bates (SD-36)
- Rosilicie Ochoa Bogh (SD-23)
- Andreas Borgeas (SD-08)
- Phillip Chen (AD-55)
- Steven Choi (AD-68)
- Jordan Cunningham (AD-35)
- Heath Flora (AD-12)
- Vince Fong (AD-34)
- James Gallagher (AD-03), Minority Leader of the California Assembly (2022–present)
- Shannon Grove (SD-16)
- Brian Jones (SD-38)
- Kevin Kiley (AD-06)
- Tom Lackey (AD-36)
- Devon Mathis (AD-26)
- Melissa Melendez (SD-28)
- Thurston Smith (AD-33))
- Suzette Martinez Valladares (AD-38)
- Marie Waldron (AD-75)
- Scott Wilk (SD-21), Minority Leader of the California Senate (2021–present)

Former state legislators

- Bob Huff (SD-29)
- Gloria Romero (Democratic) (SD-24)

Individuals

- Andy Slavitt, Administrator of the Centers for Medicare and Medicaid Services (2015-2017), Senior Advisor to the COVID-19 Response Coordinator (2021)
- Andrew Yang (Forward), founder of Venture for America, Democratic candidate for President of the United States in 2020

Newspapers and other media

- Bakersfield Californian
- Daily Breeze
- East Bay Times (previously endorsed Glazer)
- Fresno Bee (previously endorsed Glazer)
- Inland Valley Daily Bulletin
- The Korea Daily
- Lake County Record-Bee
- Los Angeles Daily News
- Los Angeles Times
- Marin Independent Journal (previously endorsed Glazer)
- Merced Sun-Star
- Mercury News (previously endorsed Glazer)
- Modesto Bee
- Orange County Register
- Pasadena Star News
- Press-Enterprise
- Press-Telegram
- Redlands Daily Facts
- Sacramento Bee (previously endorsed Glazer)
- San Bernardino Sun
- San Diego Union-Tribune
- San Francisco Chronicle (previously endorsed Galperin)
- San Gabriel Valley Tribune
- Santa Barbara News-Press
- The Tribune
- Whittier Daily News

Organizations

- California Republican Party
- Howard Jarvis Taxpayers Association
Ron Galperin (D)

Newspapers and other media

- ~~San Francisco Chronicle~~ (switched endorsement to Chen after Galperin was eliminated)

Organizations

- ~~Equality California~~ (switched endorsement to Cohen after Galperin was eliminated)
- Stonewall Democrats
Steve Glazer (D)

Newspapers and other media

- ~~East Bay Times~~ (switched endorsement to Chen after Glazer was eliminated)
- ~~The Fresno Bee~~ (switched endorsement to Chen after Glazer was eliminated)
- ~~Marin Independent Journal~~ (switched endorsement to Chen after Glazer was eliminated)
- ~~The Mercury News~~ (switched endorsement to Chen after Glazer was eliminated)
- ~~The Sacramento Bee~~ (switched endorsement to Chen after Glazer was eliminated)
- San Francisco Examiner (co-endorsed with Cohen)
Laura Wells (G)

Organizations

- Green Party of California
- Peace and Freedom Party

== Fundraising ==
Of the 2022 California statewide races, the race for controller had the largest total amount of money spent.

By October 2021, Chen had received over $1 million from 307 donors, including Jerry Yang, Steve Poizner, and John T. Chambers. Glazer's campaign was financially supported by the California Chamber of Commerce. Yiu gave more than $5 million to her own campaign.

== Primary election ==
=== Results ===
Results by county Chen: 20–30%; 30–40%; 40–50%; 50–60%; 60–70%; 70–80%; Cohen: 20–30%; 30–40%

Primary election results
Party	Candidate	Votes	%
Republican	Lanhee Chen	2,533,305	37.22%
Democratic	Malia Cohen	1,542,397	22.66%
Democratic	Yvonne Yiu	1,024,707	15.06%
Democratic	Steve Glazer	756,518	11.11%
Democratic	Ron Galperin	690,484	10.15%
Green	Laura Wells	258,053	3.79%
Total votes		6,805,874	100.0%

== General election ==
=== Polling ===
Poll source	Date(s) administered	Sample size (Note: Key: A – all adults RV – registered voters LV – likely voters V – unclear)	Margin of error	Malia Cohen (D)	Lanhee Chen (R)	Undecided
USC	October 30 – November 2, 2022	802 (RV)	± 3.5%	58%	42%	–

=== Results ===
2022 California State Controller election
Party	Candidate	Votes	%	±%
Democratic	Malia Cohen	5,936,856	55.35%	−10.10%
Republican	Lanhee Chen	4,789,345	44.65%	+10.10%
Total votes		10,726,201	100.00%	N/A
Democratic hold				

==== By county ====
County	Malia Cohen Democratic		Lanhee Chen Republican		Margin		Total votes cast
County	#	%	#	%	#	%	Total votes cast
Alameda	353,471	73.62%	126,658	26.38%	226,813	47.24%	480,129
Alpine	345	57.02%	260	42.98%	85	14.05%	605
Amador	5,804	31.86%	12,411	68.14%	-6,607	-36.27%	18,215
Butte	30,817	43.48%	40,057	56.52%	-9,240	-13.04%	70,874
Calaveras	6,944	33.07%	14,055	66.93%	-7,111	-33.86%	20,999
Colusa	1,643	30.07%	3,821	69.93%	-2,178	-39.86%	5,464
Contra Costa	242,864	63.58%	139,100	36.42%	103,764	27.17%	381,964
Del Norte	3,259	39.56%	4,979	60.44%	-1,720	-20.88%	8,238
El Dorado	32,460	37.34%	54,471	62.66%	-22,011	-25.32%	86,931
Fresno	89,626	41.95%	124,029	58.05%	-34,403	-16.10%	213,655
Glenn	2,073	26.65%	5,707	73.35%	-3,634	-46.71%	7,780
Humboldt	28,917	61.54%	18,070	38.46%	10,847	23.09%	46,987
Imperial	16,363	55.52%	13,108	44.48%	3,255	11.04%	29,471
Inyo	3,199	44.04%	4,065	55.96%	-866	-11.92%	7,264
Kern	68,773	36.92%	117,479	63.08%	-48,706	-26.15%	186,252
Kings	9,169	34.56%	17,362	65.44%	-8,193	-30.88%	26,531
Lake	9,735	48.95%	10,151	51.05%	-416	-2.09%	19,886
Lassen	1,729	19.12%	7,314	80.88%	-5,585	-61.76%	9,043
Los Angeles	1,450,372	62.58%	867,338	37.42%	583,034	25.16%	2,317,710
Madera	12,683	34.71%	23,854	65.29%	-11,171	-30.57%	36,537
Marin	85,110	73.45%	30,772	26.55%	54,338	46.89%	115,882
Mariposa	2,829	36.51%	4,920	63.49%	-2,091	-26.98%	7,749
Mendocino	18,842	62.85%	11,137	37.15%	7,705	25.70%	29,979
Merced	24,528	44.93%	30,065	55.07%	-5,537	-10.14%	54,593
Modoc	772	23.11%	2,568	76.89%	-1,796	-53.77%	3,340
Mono	2,339	52.33%	2,131	47.67%	208	4.65%	4,470
Monterey	60,859	60.38%	39,937	39.62%	20,922	20.76%	100,796
Napa	30,166	61.25%	19,083	38.75%	11,083	22.50%	49,249
Nevada	25,685	51.33%	24,358	48.67%	1,327	2.65%	50,043
Orange	433,965	45.21%	525,865	54.79%	-91,900	-9.57%	959,830
Placer	68,727	38.46%	109,976	61.54%	-41,249	-23.08%	178,703
Plumas	3,151	37.01%	5,364	62.99%	-2,213	-25.99%	8,515
Riverside	273,998	46.73%	312,376	53.27%	-38,378	-6.54%	586,374
Sacramento	252,731	53.88%	216,346	46.12%	36,385	7.76%	469,077
San Benito	10,023	52.11%	9,213	47.89%	810	4.21%	19,236
San Bernardino	208,123	46.46%	239,812	53.54%	-31,689	-7.07%	447,935
San Diego	521,567	51.89%	483,650	48.11%	37,917	3.77%	1,005,217
San Francisco	221,334	75.95%	70,094	24.05%	151,240	51.90%	291,428
San Joaquin	83,204	47.49%	91,990	52.51%	-8,786	-5.02%	175,194
San Luis Obispo	55,217	46.99%	62,292	53.01%	-7,075	-6.02%	117,509
San Mateo	165,742	68.47%	76,335	31.53%	89,407	36.93%	242,077
Santa Barbara	74,339	56.04%	58,305	43.96%	16,034	12.09%	132,644
Santa Clara	337,048	63.26%	195,791	36.74%	141,257	26.51%	532,839
Santa Cruz	73,280	71.64%	29,006	28.36%	44,274	43.28%	102,286
Shasta	19,209	28.56%	48,042	71.44%	-28,833	-42.87%	67,251
Sierra	527	34.31%	1,009	65.69%	-482	-31.38%	1,536
Siskiyou	6,451	37.03%	10,969	62.97%	-4,518	-25.94%	17,420
Solano	74,879	57.98%	54,260	42.02%	20,619	15.97%	129,139
Sonoma	132,453	68.20%	61,770	31.80%	70,683	36.39%	194,223
Stanislaus	53,199	41.10%	76,242	58.90%	-23,043	-17.80%	129,441
Sutter	8,974	32.50%	18,637	67.50%	-9,663	-35.00%	27,611
Tehama	5,423	26.61%	14,956	73.39%	-9,533	-46.78%	20,379
Trinity	1,893	42.30%	2,582	57.70%	-689	-15.40%	4,475
Tulare	32,418	35.89%	57,899	64.11%	-25,481	-28.21%	90,317
Tuolumne	8,159	35.63%	14,738	64.37%	-6,579	-28.73%	22,897
Ventura	141,450	51.25%	134,524	48.75%	6,926	2.51%	275,974
Yolo	41,486	62.23%	25,181	37.77%	16,305	24.46%	66,667
Yuba	6,510	33.61%	12,861	66.39%	-6,351	-32.79%	19,371
Totals	5,936,856	55.35%	4,789,345	44.65%	1,147,511	10.70%	10,726,201

Counties that flipped from Democratic to Republican

- Butte (largest municipality: Chico)
- Fresno (largest municipality: Fresno)
- Lake (largest municipality: Clearlake)
- Merced (largest municipality: Merced)
- Orange (largest municipality: Anaheim)
- Riverside (largest municipality: Riverside)
- San Bernardino (largest municipality: San Bernardino)
- San Joaquin (largest municipality: Stockton)
- San Luis Obispo (largest municipality: San Luis Obispo)
- Stanislaus (largest municipality: Modesto)

==== By congressional district ====
Cohen won 36 of 52 congressional districts, with the remaining 16 going to Chen, including four that elected Democrats.

District	Cohen	Chen	Representative
1st	34%	66%	Doug LaMalfa
2nd	67%	33%	Jared Huffman
3rd	41%	59%	Kevin Kiley
4th	61%	39%	Mike Thompson
5th	36%	64%	Tom McClintock
6th	52%	48%	Ami Bera
7th	59%	41%	Doris Matsui
8th	71%	29%	John Garamendi
9th	47%	53%	Josh Harder
10th	59%	41%	Mark DeSaulnier
11th	77%	23%	Nancy Pelosi
12th	84%	16%	Barbara Lee
13th	45%	55%	John Duarte
14th	63%	37%	Eric Swalwell
15th	69%	31%	Jackie Speier (117th Congress)
15th	69%	31%	Kevin Mullin (118th Congress)
16th	65%	35%	Anna Eshoo
17th	63%	37%	Ro Khanna
18th	63%	37%	Zoe Lofgren
19th	61%	39%	Jimmy Panetta
20th	29%	71%	Kevin McCarthy
21st	49%	51%	Jim Costa
22nd	48%	52%	David Valadao
23rd	39%	61%	Jay Obernolte
24th	55%	45%	Salud Carbajal
25th	52%	48%	Raul Ruiz
26th	50.1%	49.9%	Julia Brownley
27th	46%	54%	Mike Garcia
28th	56%	44%	Judy Chu
29th	69%	31%	Tony Cárdenas
30th	69%	31%	Adam Schiff
31st	56%	44%	Grace Napolitano
32nd	58%	42%	Brad Sherman
33rd	54%	46%	Pete Aguilar
34th	77%	23%	Jimmy Gomez
35th	54%	46%	Norma Torres
36th	58%	42%	Ted Lieu
37th	81%	19%	Karen Bass (117th Congress)
37th	81%	19%	Sydney Kamlager-Dove (118th Congress)
38th	54%	46%	Linda Sánchez
39th	54%	46%	Mark Takano
40th	41%	59%	Young Kim
41st	44%	56%	Ken Calvert
42nd	63%	37%	Lucille Roybal-Allard (117th Congress)
42nd	63%	37%	Robert Garcia (118th Congress)
43rd	76%	24%	Maxine Waters
44th	67%	33%	Nanette Barragán
45th	46%	54%	Michelle Steel
46th	58%	42%	Lou Correa
47th	45%	55%	Katie Porter
48th	37%	63%	Darrell Issa
49th	47%	53%	Mike Levin
50th	56%	44%	Scott Peters
51st	55%	45%	Sara Jacobs
52nd	60%	40%	Juan Vargas
