= Laura Wells =

American activist and political candidate

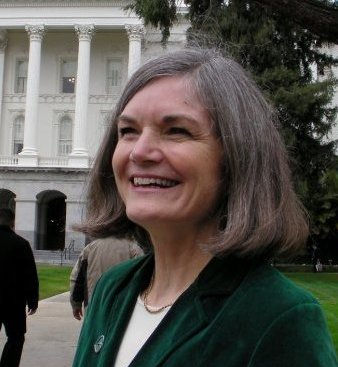
- Born: Laura Wells; January 2, 1948 (age 78); Traverse City, Michigan, U.S.
- Education: Wayne State University, Antioch University
- Occupations: former financial and business analyst
- Political party: Green
- Spouse: Charles Goodwin (engaged)
- Children: 1

Laura Wells (born January 2, 1948) is an American political activist, perennial candidate, and financial and business analyst. She is a former candidate for U.S. Representative for California's 13th congressional district in the November 2018 election and the Green Party in the 2010 governor's race in California. She supports making significant changes to Proposition 13 and to the current super-majority voting rule in the Sacramento legislature. In 2002 she garnered nearly a half million votes in her run for California state controller. At the last 2010 gubernatorial debate in California, which excluded all third party candidates, Wells was arrested upon attempting to enter the building to watch the debate.

== Background and education ==
Laura Wells was born and raised in Michigan. She earned her BA from Wayne State University in 1969, where she was a scholarship student, majored in foreign languages, and was elected to the Phi Beta Kappa society. Wells earned a Masters of Education at Antioch University, and later worked in finance, business analysis and computer programming.

Wells has resided in California for more than 30 years. She has one child.

== Politics and public service ==
Wells has served in numerous county and state-level leadership positions in the Green Party of California since she registered with the Green Party in 1992. She was a founding member of the Green Party County Council in Alameda County (1992–94; 2002–04) and co-founder and managing editor of the national Green Party newspaper, Green Focus (2002–2004).

In 2006, Wells served on the executive committee of the "IRV for Oakland" (Instant Runoff Voting) campaign while running for state controller. IRV is a voting system in which voters rank candidates in order of preference, rather than selecting only one candidate, a method which eliminates the so-called spoiler effect in elections. Wells helped garner support for IRV from U.S. Representative Barbara Lee of Oakland and other local representatives of most political parties in Oakland, including Greens, Libertarians, Peace and Freedom, Republicans, and Democrats. In November 2006, IRV achieved 69% voter approval. On January 5, 2010, the Oakland City Council voted to adopt IRV for its mayoral and council elections.

In 2002 and 2006, Wells ran campaigns for state controller, receiving 419,873 votes in 2002, the most ever for a Green Party candidate in a statewide partisan race in California. In 2009, Wells appeared on the Fox News program "Your World" several times to discuss tax fairness in California.

Wells has also participated in ten international delegations to Canada and South America to study innovations in participatory democracy and new constitutions, and has broadly worked in a range of volunteer and professional capacities for community and labor organizations, including Pesticide Action Network (North America), Women's Economic Agenda Project, and SEIU United Healthcare Workers (West). She co-founded Green Focus, a party newspaper.

== 2010 campaign for California governor ==
In January 2010, Laura Wells announced her candidacy for governor of California in the 2010 election. Wells won the Green Party primary on June 8, 2010 with over 78% of the votes.

Wells' campaign emphasized the California budget and tax issues, particularly Proposition 13, passed during Jerry Brown's tenure as governor, which she says must be changed, in part because it primarily benefits corporations over individuals. In a position paper on Proposition 13, Wells wrote:

Prop. 13, in 1978, was promoted to California voters as a way to reduce taxes and to stop fixed-income seniors and others from losing their homes due to escalating property taxes. Since then, the bulk of the "tax relief" goes places the voters never intended--giant corporations. Corporate properties are rarely re-assessed since corporations don't die and seldom sell.

Wells also favored lowering the margin needed to pass a budget and raise taxes in the state from two-thirds to a simple majority. She supported increasing funding for education, and the use of a 'split-roll tax' to keep cap residential property taxes while allowing higher property taxes for businesses. In a January 2010 interview with The Sacramento Bee discussing her views on taxes and the budget in California, Wells stated:

The two parties, the Democrat and Republican parties, do not address the root causes of the problem," Wells said. "That's off the table for them. ... To get what we want and to have the revenue that pays for it we need to have a budget that makes sense.

Wells has also addressed the difficulty that third parties have in running candidates for state elections:

... she says [the difficulty for third parties] is a result of the "locked-down" system the Democrats and Republicans have put in place. As a case in point, she said she had to pay $6,000 for a 300-word ballot statement when she ran for state controller in 2006, a fee she said blocks minor-party candidates from running.

Wells supports a Single Payer Universal Health Care solution for California, and if given the opportunity, says that she would gladly sign SB 840 (the Single Payer bill introduced by State Senator Sheila Kuehl) into law. Wells also supports the use of clean, sustainable, local energy, including publicly owned utilities, Community Choice Aggregation (CCA) and localized (distributed) electricity generation, instead of nuclear power or carbon sequestration. Wells also opposes government bailouts of large corporations and banks and proposes the creation of a State Bank for California which could partner with local banks and credit unions, and potentially improve their ability to lend. Other Green Party candidates, such as the 2010 Illinois gubernatorial candidate Rich Whitney, also support a State Bank proposal.

Wells has been endorsed by San Francisco for Democracy and numerous elected officials, described at her campaign website.

=== Arrested at debates ===
On October 12, 2010, Laura Wells was given a ticket to watch the California gubernatorial debate at Dominican University in San Rafael by a friend of hers and used it to enter the building. Wells was initially allowed in, but upon being recognized as the Green Party gubernatorial candidate, she was approached by security and asked to surrender the ticket on the grounds that it was not issued to her, but to her friend. When she refused to surrender the ticket, she was handcuffed and taken from the building and put into a police car, and arrested for "trespassing at a private party". She was later released. Wells stated:

Republicans and Democrats will go to any lengths, even arresting candidates, to keep the truth from California voters. There are solutions, but voters aren't being allowed to hear from independent candidates.

== Electoral history ==
California State Controller Green primary, 2002
Candidate	Votes	%
Laura Wells	29,457	84.12
David Delano Blanco	5,561	15.88
Total votes	35,018	100.00

California State Controller election, 2002
Party	Candidate	Votes	%
Democratic	Steve Westly	3,289,839	45.32
Republican	Tom McClintock	3,273,028	45.09
Green	Laura Wells	419,873	5.78
Natural Law	J. Carlos Aguirre	179,999	2.48
American Independent	Ernest F. Vance	96,019	1.32
Invalid or blank votes		480,063	6.20
Total votes		7,258,758	100.00
Turnout			36.05
Democratic hold			

California State Controller election, 2006
Party	Candidate	Votes	%
Democratic	John Chiang	4,232,313	50.62
Republican	Tony Strickland	3,360,611	40.19
Green	Laura Wells	260,047	3.11
Peace and Freedom	Elizabeth Cervantes Barron	212,383	2.54
Libertarian	Donna Tello	188,934	2.26
American Independent	Warren Campbell	106,761	1.28
Invalid or blank votes		538,010	6.05
Total votes		8,361,049	100.00
Turnout			39.29
Democratic hold			

California gubernatorial election, 2010
Party	Candidate	Votes	%
Democratic	Jerry Brown	5,428,458	53.77
Republican	Meg Whitman	4,127,371	40.89
American Independent	Chelene Nightingale	166,308	1.7
Libertarian	Dale Ogden	150,898	1.5
Green	Laura Wells	129,231	1.2
Peace and Freedom	Carlos Alvarez	92,856	0.9
Independent	Other (write-ins)	363	0.0
Total votes		10,095,485	100.00
Democratic gain from Republican			

2014 California State Controller primary
Party	Candidate	Votes	%
Republican	Ashley Swearengin	1,001,473	24.79
Democratic	Betty Yee	878,195	21.74
Democratic	John Pérez	877,714	21.73
Republican	David Evans	850,109	21.05
Green	Laura Wells	231,352	5.73
Democratic	Tammy D. Blair	200,532	4.96
Turnout		4,039,375	13.68

California's 13th congressional district election, 2018
Primary election
Party	Candidate	Votes	%
Democratic	Barbara Lee (incumbent)	159,751	99.3
Green	Laura Wells (write-in)	832	0.5
Republican	Jeanne Marie Solnordal (write-in)	178	0.1
Libertarian	James M. Eyer (write-in)	39	0.0
No party preference	Lanenna Joiner (write-in)	26	0.0
American Independent	Vincent May (write-in)	3	0.0
Total votes		160,829	100.0
General election
Democratic	Barbara Lee (incumbent)	260,580	88.4
Green	Laura Wells	34,257	11.6
Total votes		294,837	100.0
Democratic hold			

Controller election
Primary election
Party	Candidate	Votes	%
Republican	Lanhee Chen	2,533,305	37.2
Democratic	Malia Cohen	1,542,397	22.7
Democratic	Yvonne Yiu	1,024,707	15.1
Democratic	Steve Glazer	756,518	11.1
Democratic	Ron Galperin	690,484	10.1
Green	Laura Wells	258,053	3.8
Total votes		6,805,464	100.0
General election
Democratic	Malia Cohen	5,936,852	55.35%
Republican	Lanhee Chen	4,789,340	44.65%
Total votes		10,726,192	100.0%
