= 2012 Fresno mayoral election =

Fresno mayoral election, 2012
- June 5, 2012
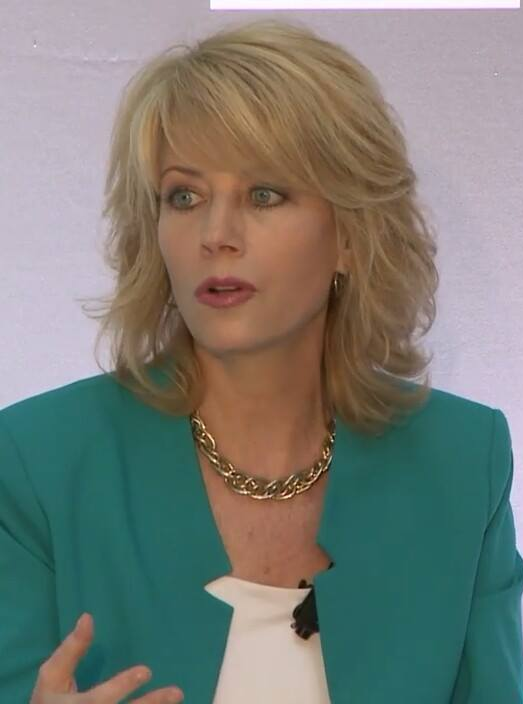

Candidate	Ashley Swearengin	Barbara Ann Hunt	Joe Garcia, Jr.
Party	Nonpartisan	Nonpartisan	Nonpartisan
Popular vote	39,342	4,545	3,758
Percentage	74.80%	8.64%	7.14%
Mayor before election
Ashley Swearengin
Republican
Elected mayor
Ashley Swearengin
Republican

The 2012 Fresno mayoral election was held on June 5, 2012, to elect the mayor of Fresno, California. It saw the reelection of Ashley Swearengin.

Since Swearengin won a majority in the first round, no runoff was required.

Municipal elections in California are officially non-partisan.

== Results ==
Results
Candidate	Votes	%
Ashley Swearengin (incumbent)	39,342	74.80
Barbara Ann Hunt	4,545	8.64
Joe Garcia, Jr.	3,758	7.14
Rick Morse	2,389	4.54
Richard Renteria (write-in)	11	0.02
Other write-ins	248	0.47
Total votes	52,598	
