= Ashley Swearengin =

American politician (born 1972)

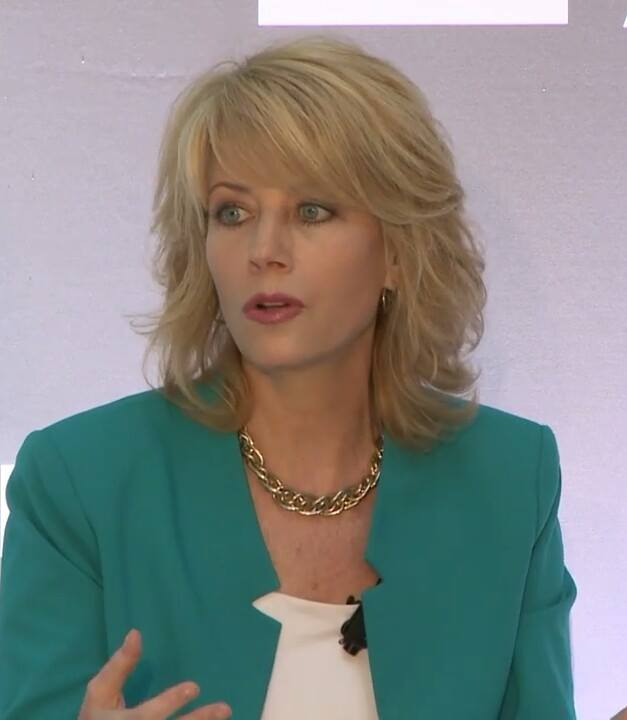
- Swearengin in 2016

24th Mayor of Fresno
- In office January 6, 2009 – January 3, 2017
- Preceded by: Alan Autry
- Succeeded by: Lee Brand

Personal details
- Born: Ashley Emile Newton; May 24, 1972 (age 54) Fort Worth, Texas, U.S.
- Party: Republican
- Spouse: Paul Swearengin
- Children: 2
- Education: California State University, Fresno (BS, MBA)

Ashley Emile Swearengin (née Newton; born May 24, 1972) is an American politician who served as the 24th mayor of Fresno, California. She is Fresno's second female mayor. She was first elected in a run-off election in 2008 and was re-elected in 2012. Swearengin ran for State Controller in 2014. After leaving the mayor's office, she became the president and CEO of the Central Valley Community Foundation.

== Early life and education ==
Swearengin was born in Texas and raised in Arkansas. Her family moved to Fresno in 1987. She graduated from Fresno Christian High School and subsequently attended California State University, Fresno.

Swearengin holds a Bachelor of Science (magna cum laude) and a Master of Business Administration (summa cum laude) from California State University, Fresno. Her husband, Paul, and she have two children, Sydney and Samuel.

== Early career ==
In 2000, she became director of the Office of Community and Economic Development at California State University, Fresno.

In 2002, she co-founded the Regional Jobs Initiative (RJI), an industry-focused effort aimed at helping the unemployment in Fresno County. She served as the chief operations officer.

In 2005, she became lead executive for the California Partnership for the San Joaquin Valley, a group formed by Republican governor Arnold Schwarzenegger. Today, she serves as the deputy chair of the partnership's board of directors.

== Mayor of Fresno ==
=== Elections ===
In 2008, she ran for Mayor of Fresno, California. Alan Autry, who had served as Mayor for two full terms, endorsed Swearengin as his successor before he left office under California term limit rules. Swearengin campaigned on the four "priority issues" of Jobs and Education; Safe, Quality Neighborhoods; Effective and Responsive Government; and Regional Leadership. She defeated Henry T. Perea 54%-45%.

In 2012, she won re-election to a second term with 75% of the vote, defeating four other candidates.

=== Tenure ===
In her first week in office, she and Police Chief Jerry Dyer introduced Operation Monitor: designed to allow GPS tracking devices on registered sex offenders after being released on parole. She inherited a difficult budget shortfall. She stated "I don't think anybody thought that within an 11 month window we'd have to close a $55 million dollar budget shortfall. When I started this job the general fund was $255 million dollars. So a $55 million dollar hole is significant for an organization of our size."

In March 2012, Ashley Swearengin announced that the City was facing a fiscal emergency because of the state's continued economic troubles combined with high cost contracts for certain segments of the city's labor force. A USA Today listed Fresno among 10 cities that could follow Stockton and Vallejo into Chapter 9 bankruptcy.

The unemployment level of the city of Fresno was 12.5% in August 2013, having fallen from 17% since Mayor Swearengin came into office. She proposed a plan called "Fresno's First Steps Home," which will battle chronic homelessness in the city.

== Other elections ==
In 2014, she ran for the office of California State Controller. She advanced to the general election, where she lost to Democrat Betty Yee, 54%-to-46%.

== Electoral history ==
2008 Fresno mayoral election
| Candidate | First round | | Runoff | |
| Candidate | Votes | % | Votes | % |
|---|---|---|---|---|
| Ashley Swearengin | 15,410 | 27.11 | 72,784 | 54.35 |
| Henry Perea | 15,626 | 27.49 | 54.35 | 45.40 |
| Jerry Duncan | 6,495 | 11.43 | | |
| Jeff L. Eben | 5,572 | 9.80 | | |
| Tom Boyajian | 5,286 | 9.30 | | |
| Mike Dages | 4,601 | 8.09 | | |
| Doug Vagim | 1,226 | 2.16 | | |
| Barbara Ann Hunt | 1,089 | 1.92 | | |
| Henry M. Montreal | 682 | 1.20 | | |
| Jim Boswell | 533 | 0.94 | | |
| Ignacio C. Garbibay | 256 | 0.45 | | |
| Write-ins | —N/a | —N/a | 336 | 0.25 |
| Total | —N/a | —N/a | 140,192 | 100 |

2012 Fresno mayoral election
| Candidate | Votes | % |
|---|---|---|
| Ashley Swearengin (incumbent) | 39,342 | 74.80 |
| Barbara Ann Hunt | 4,545 | 8.64 |
| Joe Garcia, Jr. | 3,758 | 7.14 |
| Rick Morse | 2,389 | 4.54 |
| Richard Renteria (write-in) | 11 | 0.02 |
| Other write-ins | 248 | 0.47 |
| Total votes | 52,598 | |

2014 California State Controller election
Primary election
| Party | Candidate | Votes | % |
|---|---|---|---|
| Republican | Ashley Swearengin | 1,001,473 | 24.79 |
| Democratic | Betty Yee | 878,195 | 21.74 |
| Democratic | John Pérez | 877,714 | 21.73 |
| Republican | David Evans | 850,109 | 21.05 |
| Green | Laura Wells | 231,352 | 5.73 |
| Democratic | Tammy D. Blair | 200,532 | 4.96 |
| Turnout | | 4,039,375 | 13.68 |
General election
| Democratic | Betty Yee | 3,810,304 | 53.97 |
| Republican | Ashley Swearengin | 3,249,668 | 46.03 |
| Total votes | | 7,059,972 | 100 |
| Democratic hold | | | |

Political offices
| Preceded by Alan Autry | 24th Mayor of Fresno; 2009–2017 | Succeeded by Lee Brand |
