= 2008 Fresno mayoral election =

Fresno mayoral election, 2008
- June 3, 2008 (first round); November 4, 2008 (runoff)
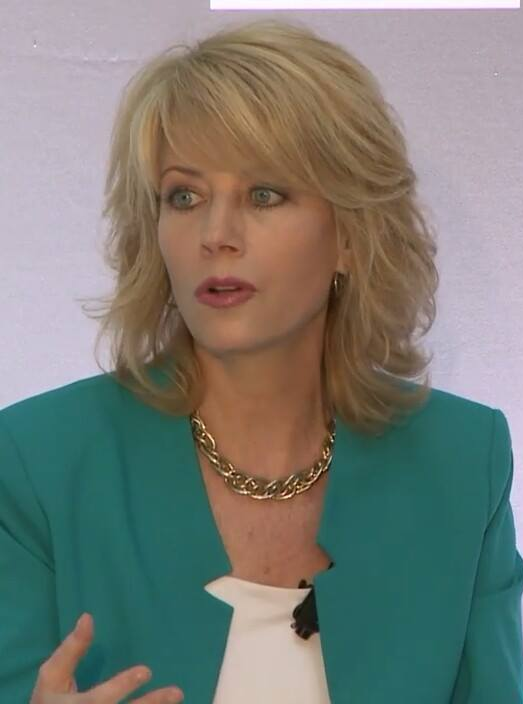

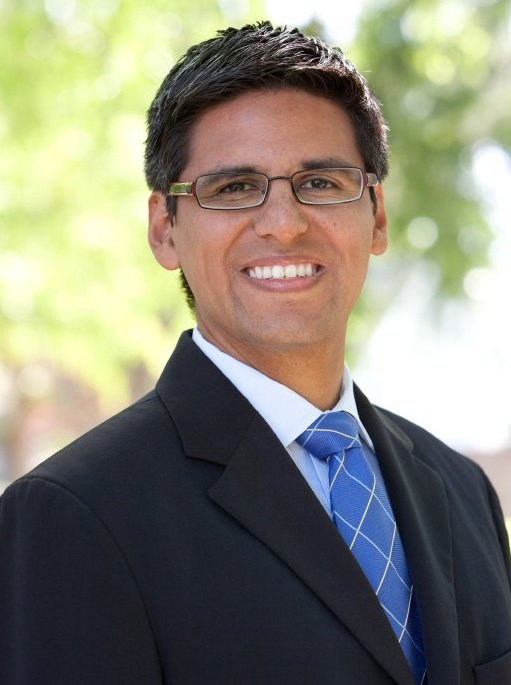

Candidate	Ashley Swearengin	Henry Perea	Jerry Duncan
Party	Republican	Democratic	Nonpartisan
First-round vote	15,410	15,626	6,495
First-round percentage	27.11%	27.49%	11.43%
Second-round vote	72,784	60,804
Second-round percentage	54.35%	45.40%
Candidate	Jeff L. Eben	Tom Boyajian	Mike Dages
Party	Nonpartisan	Nonpartisan	Nonpartisan
First-round vote	5,572	5,286	4,601
First-round percentage	9.80%	9.30%	8.09%
Mayor before election
Alan Autry
Republican
Elected mayor
Ashley Swearengin
Republican

The 2008 Fresno mayoral election was held on June 3, 2008 and November 4, 2008 to elect the mayor of Fresno, California. It saw the election of Ashley Swearengin.

Incumbent mayor Alan Autry was term limited.

== Results ==
=== First round ===
First round results
Candidate	Votes	%
Henry Perea	15,626	27.49
Ashley Swearengin	15,410	27.11
Jerry Duncan	6,495	11.43
Jeff L. Eben	5,572	9.80
Tom Boyajian	5,286	9.30
Mike Dages	4,601	8.09
Doug Vagim	1,226	2.16
Barbara Ann Hunt	1,089	1.92
Henry M. Montreal	682	1.20
Jim Boswell	533	0.94
Ignacio C. Garbibay	256	0.45

=== Runoff results ===
Runoff results
Candidate	Votes	%
Ashley Swearengin	72,784	54.35
Henry Perea	60,804	45.40
Write-ins	336	0.25
Total votes	133,924	
