= 2014 California Secretary of State election =

- November 4, 2014
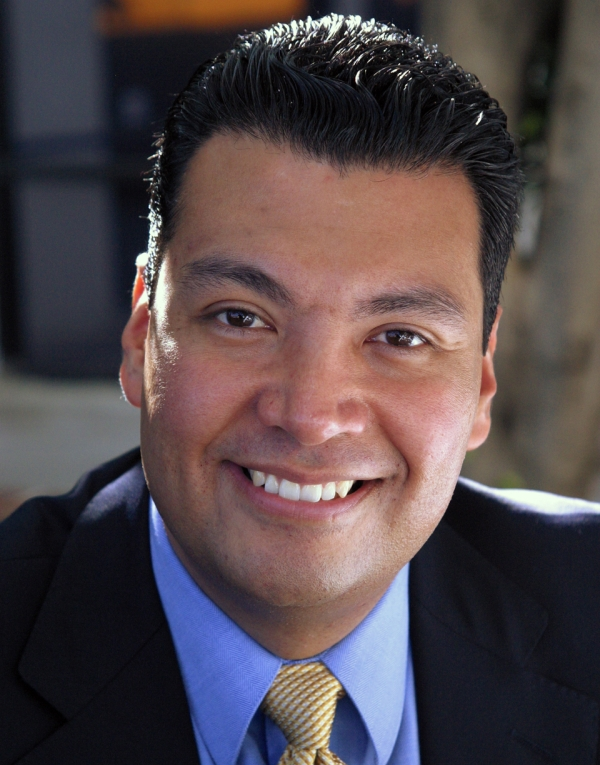

Nominee	Alex Padilla	Pete Peterson
Party	Democratic	Republican
Popular vote	3,799,711	3,285,334
Percentage	53.63%	46.37%
- County results Padilla: 50–60% 60–70% 70–80% Peterson: 50–60% 60–70% 70–80%
Secretary of State before election
Debra Bowen
Democratic
Elected Secretary of State
Alex Padilla
Democratic

The 2014 California Secretary of State election was held on November 4, 2014, to elect the secretary of state of California. Incumbent Democratic secretary of state Debra Bowen was term-limited and ineligible to run for re-election to a third term in office.

A primary election was held on June 3, 2014. Under California's nonpartisan blanket primary law, all candidates appear on the same ballot, regardless of party. In the primary, voters may vote for any candidate, regardless of their party affiliation. The top two finishers — regardless of party — advance to the general election in November, even if a candidate manages to receive a majority of the votes cast in the primary election. Washington is the only other state with this system, a so-called "top two primary" (Louisiana has a similar "jungle primary").

Democrat Alex Padilla and Republican Pete Peterson finished first and second, respectively, and contested the general election, which Padilla won by 7.2 percentage points. As a result, it was the closest statewide race in California that year. As of 2026, this election, alongside the concurrent state controller election, is also the last time in which a statewide California race between a Democrat and a Republican was decided by single digits; and in which Mono, San Diego, San Luis Obispo, and Ventura Counties voted for the Republican in a statewide race.

== Primary election ==
=== Candidates ===
==== Democratic Party ====
===== Declared =====
- Derek Cressman, political reform and anti-dark money activist and former vice president of Common Cause
- Jeffrey H. Drobman, computer scientist and engineer
- Alex Padilla, state senator

===== Withdrew =====
- Leland Yee, state senator

==== Republican Party ====
===== Declared =====
- Roy Allmond, California state employee
- Pete Peterson, executive director of the Davenport Institute for Public Engagement at Pepperdine University

==== Green Party ====
===== Declared =====
- David S. Curtis, architectural designer

==== Independent ====
===== Declared =====
- Daniel Schnur, former chairman of the California Fair Political Practices Commission and former Republican strategist

=== Polling ===
Poll source	Date(s) administered	Sample size	Margin of error	Derek Cressman (D)	David Curtis (G)	Alex Padilla (D)	Pete Peterson (R)	Daniel Schnur (I)	Leland Yee (D)	Other	Undecided
SurveyUSA	May 16–19, 2014	610	±4%	—	—	48%	32%	—	—	9%	11%
Field Poll	March 18–April 5, 2014	504	±4.5%	3%	5%	17%	30%	4%	—	<0.5%	41%
Field Poll	March 18–April 5, 2014	504	±4.5%	2%	4%	10%	27%	4%	8%	1%	44%

=== Results ===
California Secretary of State primary election, 2014
Party	Candidate	Votes	%
Democratic	Alex Padilla	1,217,371	30.24
Republican	Pete Peterson	1,194,715	29.68
Democratic	Leland Yee	380,361	9.45
No party preference	Daniel Schnur	369,898	9.19
Democratic	Derek Cressman	306,375	7.61
Republican	Roy Allmond	256,668	6.38
Democratic	Jeffrey H. Drobman	178,521	4.44
Green	David S. Curtis	121,618	3.02
Total votes		4,025,527	100
Turnout			13.63

== General election ==
=== Polling ===
Poll source	Date(s) administered	Sample size	Margin of error	Alex Padilla (D)	Pete Peterson (R)	Undecided
GQR/American Viewpoint	October 22–29, 2014	1,162	± 3.3%	45%	41%	14%
Field Poll	October 15–28, 2014	941	± 3.4%	44%	37%	19%
Field Poll	August 14–28, 2014	467	± 4.8%	43%	36%	21%
Gravis Marketing	July 22–24, 2014	580	± 4%	34%	37%	28%

=== Results ===
2014 California Secretary of State election
Party	Candidate	Votes	%
Democratic	Alex Padilla	3,799,711	53.63
Republican	Pete Peterson	3,285,334	46.37
Total votes		7,085,045	100.00
Democratic hold			

==== By county ====
County	Alex Padilla Democratic		Pete Peterson Republican		Margin		Total votes cast
County	#	%	#	%	#	%	Total votes cast
Alameda	256,280	74.49%	87,786	25.51%	168,494	48.97%	344,066
Alpine	262	57.84%	191	42.16%	71	15.67%	453
Amador	4,708	37.74%	7,768	62.26%	-3,060	-24.53%	12,476
Butte	25,238	42.03%	34,803	57.97%	-9,565	-15.93%	60,041
Calaveras	5,664	37.35%	9,500	62.65%	-3,836	-25.30%	15,164
Colusa	1,339	32.88%	2,733	67.12%	-1,394	-34.23%	4,072
Contra Costa	144,610	58.88%	101,006	41.12%	43,604	17.75%	245,616
Del Norte	2,911	43.35%	3,804	56.65%	-893	-13.30%	6,715
El Dorado	21,760	36.56%	37,759	63.44%	-15,999	-26.88%	59,519
Fresno	66,156	42.22%	90,535	57.78%	-24,379	-15.56%	156,691
Glenn	1,597	27.36%	4,241	72.64%	-2,644	-45.29%	5,838
Humboldt	21,882	60.67%	14,183	39.33%	7,699	21.35%	36,065
Imperial	12,653	60.94%	8,111	39.06%	4,542	21.87%	20,764
Inyo	2,106	39.58%	3,215	60.42%	-1,109	-20.84%	5,321
Kern	47,008	35.55%	85,225	64.45%	-38,217	-28.90%	132,233
Kings	7,784	35.39%	14,212	64.61%	-6,428	-29.22%	21,996
Lake	9,358	54.90%	7,686	45.10%	1,672	9.81%	17,044
Lassen	1,757	26.01%	4,999	73.99%	-3,242	-47.99%	6,756
Los Angeles	880,939	62.50%	528,630	37.50%	352,309	24.99%	1,409,569
Madera	9,033	34.27%	17,328	65.73%	-8,295	-31.47%	26,361
Marin	58,358	70.27%	24,685	29.73%	33,673	40.55%	83,043
Mariposa	2,319	36.16%	4,095	63.84%	-1,776	-27.69%	6,414
Mendocino	15,404	65.55%	8,095	34.45%	7,309	31.10%	23,499
Merced	16,475	45.91%	19,408	54.09%	-2,933	-8.17%	35,883
Modoc	723	25.78%	2,082	74.22%	-1,359	-48.45%	2,805
Mono	1,394	46.14%	1,627	53.86%	-233	-7.71%	3,021
Monterey	42,793	59.59%	29,014	40.41%	13,779	19.19%	71,807
Napa	21,336	58.60%	15,074	41.40%	6,262	17.20%	36,410
Nevada	17,538	47.17%	19,639	52.83%	-2,101	-5.65%	37,177
Orange	234,604	38.70%	371,653	61.30%	-137,049	-22.61%	606,257
Placer	39,647	36.02%	70,436	63.98%	-30,789	-27.97%	110,083
Plumas	2,501	36.05%	4,436	63.95%	-1,935	-27.89%	6,937
Riverside	153,341	44.44%	191,721	55.56%	-38,380	-11.12%	345,062
Sacramento	170,627	54.16%	144,388	45.84%	26,239	8.33%	315,015
San Benito	7,327	55.43%	5,892	44.57%	1,435	10.86%	13,219
San Bernardino	127,575	45.24%	154,425	54.76%	-26,850	-9.52%	282,000
San Diego	301,060	45.99%	353,503	54.01%	-52,443	-8.01%	654,563
San Francisco	162,575	78.50%	44,537	21.50%	118,038	56.99%	207,112
San Joaquin	54,118	47.48%	59,868	52.52%	-5,750	-5.04%	113,986
San Luis Obispo	38,802	46.63%	44,403	53.37%	-5,601	-6.73%	83,205
San Mateo	101,379	65.75%	52,798	34.25%	48,581	31.51%	154,177
Santa Barbara	56,458	52.73%	50,612	47.27%	5,846	5.46%	107,070
Santa Clara	230,452	61.07%	146,920	38.93%	83,532	22.14%	377,372
Santa Cruz	49,337	70.43%	20,712	29.57%	28,625	40.86%	70,049
Shasta	17,536	31.63%	37,900	68.37%	-20,364	-36.73%	55,436
Sierra	527	35.58%	954	64.42%	-427	-28.83%	1,481
Siskiyou	5,387	40.03%	8,070	59.97%	-2,683	-19.94%	13,457
Solano	50,195	57.56%	37,016	42.44%	13,179	15.11%	87,211
Sonoma	92,369	66.80%	45,913	33.20%	46,456	33.60%	138,282
Stanislaus	38,004	43.09%	50,203	56.91%	-12,199	-13.83%	88,207
Sutter	6,721	33.87%	13,123	66.13%	-6,402	-32.26%	19,844
Tehama	4,516	29.82%	10,629	70.18%	-6,113	-40.36%	15,145
Trinity	1,657	43.65%	2,139	56.35%	-482	-12.70%	3,796
Tulare	20,713	33.82%	40,528	66.18%	-19,815	-32.36%	61,241
Tuolumne	6,256	37.74%	10,321	62.26%	-4,065	-24.52%	16,577
Ventura	95,113	48.74%	100,025	51.26%	-4,912	-2.52%	195,138
Yolo	27,269	61.94%	16,757	38.06%	10,512	23.88%	44,026
Yuba	4,260	34.70%	8,018	65.30%	-3,758	-30.61%	12,278
Total	3,799,711	53.63%	3,285,334	46.37%	514,377	7.26%	7,085,045
