= 2014 California State Controller election =

- November 4, 2014
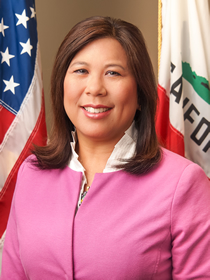

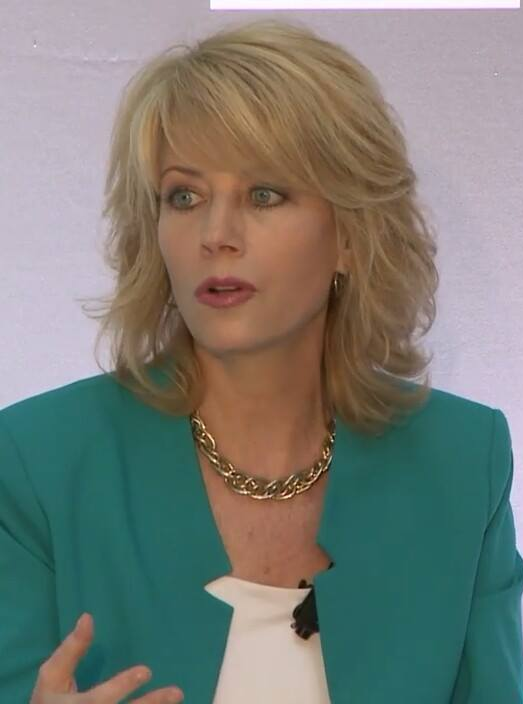
Nominee	Betty Yee	Ashley Swearengin
Party	Democratic	Republican
Popular vote	3,810,304	3,249,668
Percentage	53.97%	46.03%
- County results Yee: 50–60% 60–70% 70–80% 80–90% Swearengin: 50–60% 60–70% 70–80%
State Controller before election
John Chiang
Democratic
Elected State Controller
Betty Yee
Democratic

The 2014 California State Controller election was held on November 4, 2014, to elect the State Controller of California. Incumbent Democratic State Controller John Chiang was term-limited and ineligible to run for re-election to a third term in office and instead ran successfully for California State Treasurer.

A primary election was held on June 3, 2014. Under California's nonpartisan blanket primary law, all candidates appear on the same ballot, regardless of party. In the primary, voters may vote for any candidate, regardless of their party affiliation. The top two finishers — regardless of party — advance to the general election in November, even if a candidate manages to receive a majority of the votes cast in the primary election. Washington is the only other state with this system, a so-called "top two primary" (Louisiana has a similar "jungle primary").

In the primary, Republican Ashley Swearengin and Democrat Betty Yee finished first and second, respectively. The third-place finisher, Democrat John Pérez, initially called for a recount in 15 counties after official results showed him trailing Yee by 481 votes; however, he ultimately conceded to Yee more than a month after the primary. Swearengin and Yee contested the general election, which Yee won. As of 2026, this election, alongside the concurrent secretary of state election, is the last time in which a statewide California race between a Democrat and a Republican was decided by single digits; and in which Mono, San Diego, San Luis Obispo, and Ventura Counties voted for the Republican in a statewide race.

== Primary election ==
=== Candidates ===
==== Democratic Party ====
===== Declared =====
- Tammy D. Blair, administrator
- John Pérez, Speaker of the California State Assembly
- Betty Yee, Member of the State Board of Equalization

===== Declined =====
- Bill Lockyer, State Treasurer and former California Attorney General

==== Republican Party ====
===== Declared =====
- David Evans, accountant, candidate for California's 22nd congressional district in 2006 and for Controller in 2010
- Ashley Swearengin, Mayor of Fresno

===== Withdrew =====
- Tina Mizany

==== Green Party ====
===== Declared =====
- Laura Wells, activist, retired financial and business analyst, nominee for Controller in 2002 and 2006 and nominee for Governor in 2010

=== Polling ===
Poll source	Date(s) administered	Sample size	Margin of error	John Pérez (D)	Ashley Swearengin (R)	Betty Yee (D)	Other	Undecided
SurveyUSA	May 16–19, 2014	610	±4%	18%	31%	24%	8%	18%
Field Poll	Mar. 18–Apr. 5, 2014	504	±4.5%	14%	28%	19%	1%	38%

=== Results ===
California State Controller primary election, 2014
Party	Candidate	Votes	%
Republican	Ashley Swearengin	1,001,473	24.79
Democratic	Betty Yee	878,195	21.74
Democratic	John Pérez	877,714	21.73
Republican	David Evans	850,109	21.05
Green	Laura Wells	231,352	5.73
Democratic	Tammy D. Blair	200,532	4.96
Total votes		4,039,375	100
Turnout			13.68

== General election ==
=== Polling ===
Poll source	Date(s) administered	Sample size	Margin of error	Betty Yee (D)	Ashley Swearengin (R)	Undecided
GQR/American Viewpoint	October 22–29, 2014	1,162	± 3.3%	46%	38%	16%
Field Poll	October 15–28, 2014	941	± 3.4%	44%	36%	20%
Field Poll	August 14–28, 2014	467	± 4.8%	46%	32%	22%
Gravis Marketing	July 22–24, 2014	580	± 4%	39%	39%	22%

=== Results ===
2014 California State Controller election
Party	Candidate	Votes	%
Democratic	Betty Yee	3,810,304	53.97
Republican	Ashley Swearengin	3,249,668	46.03
Total votes		7,059,972	100.00

==== By county ====
County	Betty Yee Democratic		Ashley Swearengin Republican		Margin		Total votes cast
County	#	%	#	%	#	%	Total votes cast
Alameda	264,541	76.87%	79,605	23.13%	184,936	53.74%	344,146
Alpine	258	56.95%	195	43.05%	63	13.91%	453
Amador	4,867	38.92%	7,639	61.08%	-2,772	-22.17%	12,506
Butte	26,287	43.97%	33,500	56.03%	-7,213	-12.06%	59,787
Calaveras	5,908	39.15%	9,182	60.85%	-3,274	-21.70%	15,090
Colusa	1,446	35.68%	2,607	64.32%	-1,161	-28.65%	4,053
Contra Costa	148,329	60.80%	95,643	39.20%	52,686	21.60%	243,972
Del Norte	3,104	45.80%	3,673	54.20%	-569	-8.40%	6,777
El Dorado	22,447	37.76%	36,994	62.24%	-14,547	-24.47%	59,441
Fresno	65,586	41.49%	92,497	58.51%	-26,911	-17.02%	158,083
Glenn	1,718	29.53%	4,099	70.47%	-2,381	-40.93%	5,817
Humboldt	22,852	63.35%	13,219	36.65%	9,633	26.71%	36,071
Imperial	12,346	59.78%	8,307	40.22%	4,039	19.56%	20,653
Inyo	2,095	39.76%	3,174	60.24%	-1,079	-20.48%	5,269
Kern	48,311	36.63%	83,581	63.37%	-35,270	-26.74%	131,892
Kings	7,601	34.35%	14,525	65.65%	-6,924	-31.29%	22,126
Lake	9,783	57.51%	7,227	42.49%	2,556	15.03%	17,010
Lassen	1,908	28.42%	4,805	71.58%	-2,897	-43.16%	6,713
Los Angeles	852,777	60.96%	546,211	39.04%	306,566	21.91%	1,398,988
Madera	8,898	33.41%	17,733	66.59%	-8,835	-33.18%	26,631
Marin	59,755	72.05%	23,176	27.95%	36,579	44.11%	82,931
Mariposa	2,257	34.79%	4,230	65.21%	-1,973	-30.41%	6,487
Mendocino	15,825	67.79%	7,519	32.21%	8,306	35.58%	23,344
Merced	14,155	39.68%	21,522	60.32%	-7,367	-20.65%	35,677
Modoc	794	28.41%	2,001	71.59%	-1,207	-43.18%	2,795
Mono	1,430	47.51%	1,580	52.49%	-150	-4.98%	3,010
Monterey	44,955	62.66%	26,786	37.34%	18,169	25.33%	71,741
Napa	21,825	59.96%	14,575	40.04%	7,250	19.92%	36,400
Nevada	18,202	48.96%	18,977	51.04%	-775	-2.08%	37,179
Orange	228,754	38.02%	372,950	61.98%	-144,196	-23.96%	601,704
Placer	41,086	37.33%	68,971	62.67%	-27,885	-25.34%	110,057
Plumas	2,722	39.31%	4,203	60.69%	-1,481	-21.39%	6,925
Riverside	148,339	43.27%	194,494	56.73%	-46,155	-13.46%	342,833
Sacramento	173,840	54.90%	142,790	45.10%	31,050	9.81%	316,630
San Benito	7,473	56.62%	5,726	43.38%	1,747	13.24%	13,199
San Bernardino	122,636	43.77%	157,568	56.23%	-34,932	-12.47%	280,204
San Diego	303,372	46.70%	346,308	53.30%	-42,936	-6.61%	649,680
San Francisco	170,385	81.48%	38,730	18.52%	131,655	62.96%	209,115
San Joaquin	56,494	49.77%	57,005	50.23%	-511	-0.45%	113,499
San Luis Obispo	38,880	46.96%	43,914	53.04%	-5,034	-6.08%	82,794
San Mateo	105,450	68.37%	48,775	31.63%	56,675	36.75%	154,225
Santa Barbara	56,329	52.84%	50,280	47.16%	6,049	5.67%	106,609
Santa Clara	237,646	62.91%	140,088	37.09%	97,558	25.83%	377,734
Santa Cruz	50,466	72.12%	19,510	27.88%	30,956	44.24%	69,976
Shasta	18,863	34.21%	36,282	65.79%	-17,419	-31.59%	55,145
Sierra	559	37.85%	918	62.15%	-359	-24.31%	1,477
Siskiyou	5,701	43.18%	7,501	56.82%	-1,800	-13.63%	13,202
Solano	51,733	59.38%	35,393	40.62%	16,340	18.75%	87,126
Sonoma	95,107	68.84%	43,047	31.16%	52,060	37.68%	138,154
Stanislaus	39,404	44.60%	48,951	55.40%	-9,547	-10.81%	88,355
Sutter	7,025	35.32%	12,864	64.68%	-5,839	-29.36%	19,889
Tehama	4,944	32.57%	10,237	67.43%	-5,293	-34.87%	15,181
Trinity	1,825	48.42%	1,944	51.58%	-119	-3.16%	3,769
Tulare	19,818	32.23%	41,674	67.77%	-21,856	-35.54%	61,492
Tuolumne	6,637	40.25%	9,854	59.75%	-3,217	-19.51%	16,491
Ventura	92,174	47.73%	100,956	52.27%	-8,782	-4.55%	193,130
Yolo	27,971	63.42%	16,131	36.58%	11,840	26.85%	44,102
Yuba	4,411	36.06%	7,822	63.94%	-3,411	-27.88%	12,233
Total	3,810,304	53.97%	3,249,668	46.03%	560,636	7.94%	7,059,972
