= Derek Cressman =

American politician

- Cressman at World Fantasy Convention 2026
- Born: 1967 (age 58–59)
- Education: Williams College
- Occupations: Author, Political activist

Derek Cressman (born December 12, 1967) is a California-based political reform advocate, author and former California Secretary of State candidate. His political ideals focus on removing big money from politics, improving campaign finance transparency and modernizing the California voter registration system. He began his work on these issues in 1995 as the Democracy Program Director for U.S. PIRG and worked in many positions, including Vice President for States, at Common Cause from 2006 to 2013.

== Advocacy work ==
As founder and director of TheRestofUs.org, Derek Cressman sued Governor Arnold Schwarzenegger in 2005 for violating California campaign finance laws. Schwarzenegger's attorneys conceded the violations, but successfully argued to have the regulations struck down by California courts.

In 2012, Cressman led efforts resulting in the California Fair Political Practices Commission (FPPC) penalizing two Arizona-based nonprofits, Americans for Responsible Leadership and the center to Protect Patient Rights. The nonprofits donated $11 million to oppose the California governor Jerry Brown's tax hike, Proposition 30, and they proposed a labor organizing reform, Proposition 32. Cressman filed the complaint with the FPPC to reveal the names of the donors who had contributed the money to the nonprofits and proposed to defeat Brown's proposals. After an investigation by the FPPC, one of the nonprofits involved was linked to Republican billionaire donors, David Koch and Charles Koch. A year later in 2013, two campaign committees were fined $15 million to the state, equaling the amount of money illegally donated to the Arizona nonprofits. Furthermore, donors affiliated with the Koch brothers network paid $1 million to the state of California due to their illegal campaign financing exposed by Cressman's FPPC complaint.

== 2014 California Secretary of State Election ==
In 2014, as a longtime activist but political newcomer, Derek Cressman ran for California Secretary of State as a member of the Democratic Party. His platform included the overhaul of corporate money removal from the political system, make campaign finance more transparent, and modernize the voter registration system. Cressman sought to use the office as a bully pulpit to have California vote on overturning Citizens United v. FEC and legalizing campaign spending limits. Ultimately, Cressman earned 7.6% of the vote, losing to former Democratic state senator Alex Padilla.

== California Proposition 49 ==
Cressman helped direct efforts to pass the Overturn Citizens United ballot measure in California (formerly numbered Proposition 49), which is a voter instruction proposition written by Senator Ted Lieu, advocating that our elected officials take action to get big money out of politics, including support for a constitutional amendment.

The question was removed by the California Supreme Court in 2014 to review the constitutionality of voter instruction measures.

On January 4, 2016, a 6–1 decision by the California Supreme Court ruled that the ballot question was legal, but the court did not put the measure on the next ballot. The California state legislature put 2016 California Proposition 59 on the ballot, and voters approved the question.

== Book work ==
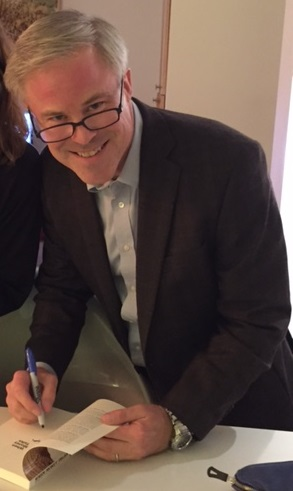
Cressman in 2016

In 2016, Cressman released When Money Talks: The High Price of "Free" Speech and the Selling of Democracy, a book discussing the movement. The book argues that the United States democracy has transformed into an oligarchic model that allots a small group of wealthy individuals the power to politically control the majority.

The book also presents solutions for citizens to rectify American democracy. In an interview with Salon, Cressman described the challenges that our democracy faces with big money in politics and specifically, "how the courts have exacerbated those problems for about 20 years." He addresses and argues against the opposition's position that conflates "free speech and the free press with paid speech and advertising."

Cressman argues that "if money is equivalent to political speech, then that speech is not free." Cressman promotes limits to paid speech, just as communities limit the amount of time any citizen can speak at a town hall meeting, in order to prevent one voice from dominate political discussions and prevent other viewpoints from reaching the public's attention.

Cressman describes the purpose of limits on freedom of speech "to ensure that there is a robust and balanced debate where we get to hear from all sides of an issue."
