= John Pérez =

American union organizer and politician (born 1969)

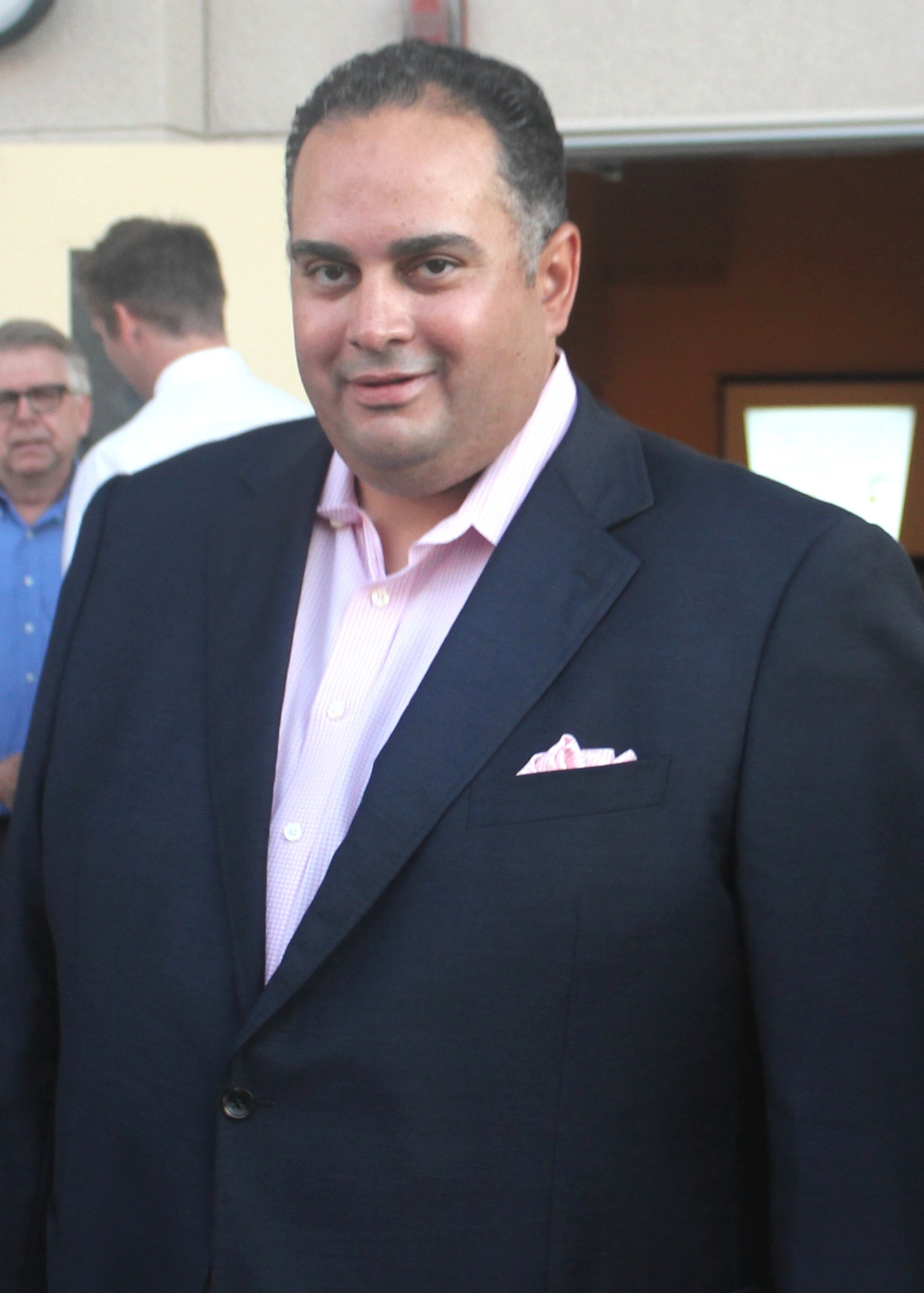
- Pérez in 2011

68th Speaker of the California State Assembly
- In office March 1, 2010 – May 12, 2014
- Preceded by: Karen Bass
- Succeeded by: Toni Atkins

Member of the California State Assembly
- In office December 1, 2008 – November 30, 2014
- Preceded by: Fabian Núñez
- Succeeded by: Miguel Santiago
- Constituency: 46th district (2008–2012); 53rd district (2012–2014)

Personal details
- Born: September 28, 1969 (age 56) Los Angeles, California, U.S.
- Party: Democratic
- Relatives: Antonio Villaraigosa (cousin)
- Education: University of California, Berkeley (attended)

John A. Pérez (born September 28, 1969) is an American union organizer and politician. He has been a Regent of the University of California since November 17, 2014, previously serving as the 68th Speaker of the California State Assembly from March 1, 2010, to May 12, 2014. A member of the Democratic Party, he represented the 46th district (2008–2012) and 53rd district (2012–2014) in the California State Assembly.

On October 9, 2013, Pérez announced his candidacy for California State Controller. Pérez finished third in the election, trailing Betty Yee by 481 votes. After initially calling for a recount in 15 California counties, Pérez ultimately conceded to Yee more than a month after the election. In late 2014, he was appointed by Governor Jerry Brown as a Regent of the University of California; in May 2019, the regents elected him as chairman.

== Early life and career ==
Pérez grew up in El Sereno and Highland Park before attending the University of California, Berkeley, where he was a member of the CalServe political party. He dropped out of Berkeley after his junior year citing family medical reasons in mid-1990. Early biographies of Pérez dating back to the 1990s called him a Berkeley graduate, a misstatement that was repeated in several press releases issued by Los Angeles mayors and in 2004 remarks inserted by Congresswoman Hilda Solis into the Congressional Record. When the San Francisco Chronicle wrote about these inconsistencies in May 2011, Pérez's office verified that he was not a Berkeley graduate.

Pérez is the cousin of Los Angeles mayor Antonio Villaraigosa and has spent seven years handling political matters for the United Food and Commercial Workers, a union representing supermarket workers. He has also served as political director of the California Labor Federation. He was a member of the board of the Los Angeles Community Redevelopment Agency until 2008, when he resigned to run for the Assembly.

== Election to the Assembly and rise to the speakership ==
=== Background in politics ===
Long active in the labor movement, Pérez is a member of the Democratic National Committee, which named him a superdelegate to the 2008 Democratic National Convention in Denver. He endorsed Barack Obama on June 3, 2008, the day of the final primaries in the Democratic presidential nominating calendar.

=== Election to the Assembly ===
The 46th district includes the Los Angeles neighborhoods of Boyle Heights, Little Tokyo, Westlake, Vernon and part of South Los Angeles. Pérez succeeded Fabian Núñez, the former Assembly speaker who was forced out by term limits as the district's assemblyman. Pérez faced only a little-known primary challenger in the race to succeed Núñez, winning convincingly. In the general election held on November 4, 2008, he won 85% of the vote.

In 2010, he ran uncontested and received 100% of the vote. In the 2012 election Pérez won the Assembly's 53rd district with 82.8% of the vote.

In 2011, after constitutionally mandated redistricting by the California Citizens Redistricting Commission most of the areas belonging to the 46th district became the 53rd.

=== Election as Speaker ===
Pérez had planned to run for the California Senate in 2010 with Kevin de León slated to be elected speaker. An agreement had apparently been reached by Los Angeles power brokers that would have seen Pérez support de León for speaker while Pérez would run unopposed in the 22nd senate district, the seat being vacated by term-limited Gil Cedillo. Cedillo, in turn, would seek Pérez's seat in the Assembly.

The deal appears to have been derailed by opposition among certain Assembly Democrats to de León becoming Speaker and by a desire to elect a Speaker who could serve longer than two years. (De León, unlike Pérez, could not serve beyond 2012.) The leadership battle came to a head on December 3, 2009, when Assembly Speaker Karen Bass announced that Pérez had enough support to succeed her. On December 10, the Assembly Democratic caucus met to select the next speaker. During the meeting, de León threw his support to Pérez, who was elected unopposed. He was formally elected by a 48–26 vote of the full Assembly on January 7, 2010, and replaced Bass on March 1, 2010.

== Speaker of the California Assembly ==
Pérez took office as California's 68th Speaker on March 1, 2010 and was reelected in 2010 and 2012, making him one of the longest serving Speakers in the era of term limits.

=== Major initiatives ===
==== Middle Class Scholarship Act ====
Pérez introduced Assembly Bill 1500 and 1501 in January 2012, together known as the Middle Class Scholarship Act. These bills were double-joined and were crafted to lower the cost of tuition at state colleges and universities for middle-class families by up to two-thirds. It also would have provided up to $150 million to California community colleges. As tax measures, they were required to achieve a two-thirds supermajority in order to pass, which the California Constitution requires due to Proposition 13 of 1978. AB 1500 and 1501 passed in the Assembly with 54 votes in favor and 25 votes against, with 1 not voting; in the Senate the bills failed to pass, receiving 15 votes in favor and 22 votes against, with 3 not voting. Pérez pledged to introduce another measure directed at college affordability during the 2013–2014 legislative sessions.

==== Governor's Office of Business Development (GoBiz) ====
In December 2010 Pérez introduced AB 29 to create the Governor's Office of Economic Development (GoBiz), a business resource hub. AB 29 eased access to the multitude of programs designed to assist businesses looking to move or incorporate in California. AB 29 passed the Assembly with 72 votes in favor and 6 votes against with 2 not voting; in the Senate the bills passed with 31 votes in favor and 3 votes against with 6 not voting. GoBiz is planning to open satellite offices in China and Mexico as a key function of their mission of attracting investment and businesses to California.

==== Disincorporation of Vernon ====
Vernon is an industrial city located in the County of Los Angeles that is home to fewer than 150 residents but acts as a business hub with more than 50,000 employees. Vernon has had a long history of corrupt public officials, official corruption, and voter intimidation. In December 2010, Perez introduced AB 46 to disincorporate the city and make it part of unincorporated Los Angeles County. There was broad support from the surrounding communities which have been plagued by the pollution and ill-effects of Vernon's businesses but resistance met with from organized labor. After passing the assembly with 62 votes in favor, 7 votes against, and 10 not voting, the bill was defeated in the Senate with 13 votes in favor, 17 votes against, and 10 not voting. Following the bill's defeat, Vernon has continued to have serious issues with their elections and public officials, including allegation of voter fraud and disenfranchisement. Additionally, the local power authority, cited frequently as a reason to keep Vernon as an independent, business-focused city, announced significant rate increases. Audits also determined that the city was millions in debt, causing some businesses to announce they were considering moving elsewhere.

==== Healthcare exchange (Covered California) ====
Following the passage of President Obama's Patient Protection and Affordable Care Act, Pérez introduced AB 1602 in January 2010 which created the California Health Benefit Exchange, the first such state based program in the nation created to assist with implementation of the Affordable Care Act. This gives individuals and small businesses access to a broad range of insurance products and cost saving options. AB 1602 passed in the Assembly with 51 votes in favor and 27 votes against with 0 not voting; in the Senate the bills passed with 21 votes in favor and 13 votes against with 5 not voting. States across the nation have used AB 1602 as a model for their own programs.

In January 2013 Governor Jerry Brown called a special legislative session to address California health care costs and solutions. During this session, Pérez introduced AB1X1. This bill is designed to allow implementation of the health care coverage expansion envisioned in President Obama's Affordable Care Act. AB1X1 makes Medi-Cal available to 1,000,000 Californians who earn at or below 120 percent of the federal poverty limit.

==== Farmers Field ====
In 2011 Pérez was instrumental in the passage of SB-292, which would have sped up construction of the proposed Farmers Field project in Los Angeles. Although Farmers Field was ultimately not built, the bill he passed later served as the basis of a statewide law that speeds approval of major construction projects without compromising the environmental standards Californians value.

=== California State Budget ===
In the first year Pérez served as an Assemblymember, the state faced a budget deficit totaling 64 billion dollars out of a total $110 billion. In his time as Speaker, California's structural deficit has been eliminated, resulting in an estimated 1 billion dollar reserve for the 2013/14 fiscal year and the first across-the-board increase in the state's credit rating since November 2004.

In 2010, he successfully blocked Governor Arnold Schwarzenegger's final budget proposal, which would have wiped out 430,000 jobs for police officers, firefighters, teachers, nurses, and their support personnel. His California Jobs Budget¸ which balanced the budget and created a ten billion dollar private sector job creation fund, forced Gov. Schwarzenegger to back down and agree to a compromise which protected virtually every job eliminated by the initial proposal.

California's budget was frequently passed after the constitutionally-mandated deadline, as the Legislature and Governors negotiated to close multibillion-dollar deficits under the requirement that budget votes have a two-thirds majority to pass. With the 2010 voter approval of Proposition 25, which lowered the threshold necessary to approve a budget to a simple majority, the Legislature adopted two consecutive, balanced and on-time budgets.

== Post-Assembly career ==
After the election, in late 2014, California Governor Jerry Brown appointed Pérez as a Regent of the University of California. In 2023, amid a housing crisis in California that had forced University of California students into homelessness, Pérez voted to block approval of an eight-story, 545-bed dorm for UCLA students in Los Angeles's affluent Westwood neighborhood and called for UCLA to come up with a different proposal. Pérez argued that living in micro-units would be bad for the students' mental health.

In 2016, after Xavier Becerra was chosen to be the new Attorney General of California, Pérez announced his candidacy for the June 2017 special election to succeed Becerra in the United States House of Representatives for California's 34th congressional district. However, he withdraw from the race in December 2016, saying that he had received a recent medical diagnosis that he said would prevent him from engaging fully in a campaign.

In 2024 as UC Regent, he characterized protests against the US-backed Israeli attacks on Gaza, in the wake of the Oct. 7 Hamas-led attack on Israel, as being founded in antisemitic tropes when they're "holding all Jews accountable." He compared it to the lack of attacks and questioning of all students of Russian heritage just because protesters against the invasion of US-backed Ukraine took issue with the Putin administration.

== Personal life ==
Pérez is openly gay and the first openly LGBT Speaker of the California State Assembly. After Minnesota's Allan Spear, he is the second LGBT person elected to lead a state legislative chamber. His election as speaker preceded the February 2010 election of Gordon D. Fox, an openly gay Democrat, to be speaker of the Rhode Island House of Representatives, though Fox took office immediately and Pérez did not take office until March 1. Pérez was the 2nd openly gay person appointed to the University of California Board of Regents. The first was Sheldon Andelson, board member of the Los Angeles Gay and Lesbian Community Services Center, who was appointed in 1980, also by then-Governor Jerry Brown.

The Gay & Lesbian Victory Fund endorsed Pérez for election. He was a member of the California Legislative LGBT Caucus.

As a supporter of Israel, he has visited the country many times, meeting with politicians and soldiers.

Political offices
Preceded by Karen Bass	Speaker of the California Assembly; 2010–2014	Succeeded by Toni Atkins
