= Betty Yee =

American politician (born 1957)

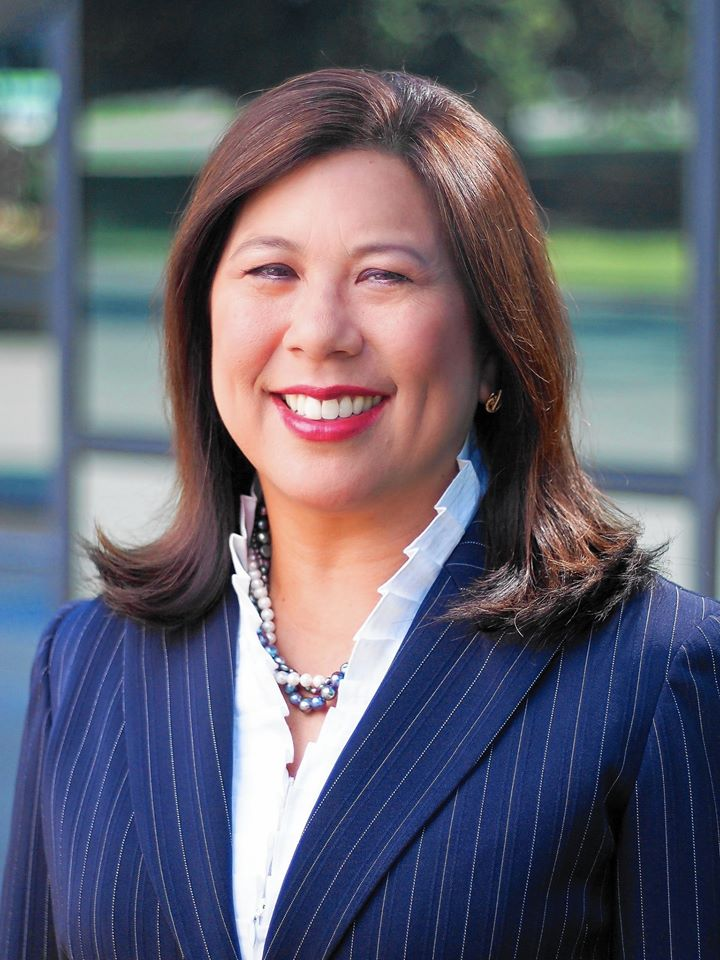
- Official portrait, 2016

32nd Controller of California
- In office January 5, 2015 – January 2, 2023
- Governor: Jerry Brown; Gavin Newsom
- Preceded by: John Chiang
- Succeeded by: Malia Cohen

Member of the California State Board of Equalization from the 1st district
- In office December 6, 2004 – January 5, 2015
- Preceded by: Carole Migden
- Succeeded by: Fiona Ma

Personal details
- Born: October 19, 1957 (age 69) San Francisco, California, U.S.
- Party: Democratic
- Education: University of California, Berkeley (BA); Golden Gate University (MPA)

Chinese name
- Chinese: 余淑婷
- Jyutping: jyu4 suk6 ting4
Transcriptions
Standard Mandarin
- Hanyu Pinyin: Yú Shūtíng
Yue: Cantonese
- Jyutping: jyu4 suk6 ting4

Betty Ting Yee (born October 19, 1957) is an American politician who served as California State Controller from 2015 to 2023. A member of the Democratic Party, Yee previously served as a member of the California State Board of Equalization from 2004 to 2015. In 2024, Yee announced her candidacy in the 2026 California gubernatorial election before suspending her campaign in 2026 and endorsing Tom Steyer.

== Early life and career ==
Yee was born on October 19, 1957, in San Francisco, to immigrant parents from Guangdong Province, China. Yee is a graduate of Lowell High School. In 1979, she graduated University of California, Berkeley with a Bachelor of Arts in sociology. In 1981, she graduated from Golden Gate University with a Master of Public Administration.

Yee worked for the legislature and was then governor Gray Davis's chief deputy director for budget. She then became chief deputy to California State Board of Equalization member Carole Migden. She was appointed to fill the seat when Migden vacated it after being elected to the California State Senate.

== Political career ==
=== California Board of Equalization ===
Yee ran for election to remain on the California State Board of Equalization after her appointment and was elected in 2006 from the 1st Board District and was re-elected in 2010. She led the successful effort to force Amazon to collect sales taxes on online purchases.

=== California State Controller ===
She ran in the 2014 California State Controller election to succeed term-limited Democratic incumbent John Chiang, who was elected California State Treasurer. In the nonpartisan primary, Republican Ashley Swearengin, the Mayor of Fresno, and Yee finished first and second, respectively. John Pérez, the third-place finisher, who was the Democratic Speaker of the California State Assembly, initially called for a recount in 15 counties after official results showed him trailing Yee by just 481 votes out of over 4 million cast; however, he ultimately conceded to Yee. Swearengin and Yee competed in the general election, which Yee won by 3,810,304 votes (53.97%) to 3,249,668 (46.03%).

Yee was on the California State Lands Commission. She opposed fracking for oil.

Yee has served as the vice chair of the California Democratic Party since May 2021, after defeating party secretary Jenny Bach and Victorville Council member Blanca Gómez.

=== 2026 gubernatorial campaign ===
Yee officially announced her campaign on March 27, 2024, with a video highlighting her upbringing as the daughter of immigrants and experience handling the state budget. Yee suspended her campaign on April 20, 2026, and endorsed Tom Steyer.

== Electoral history ==
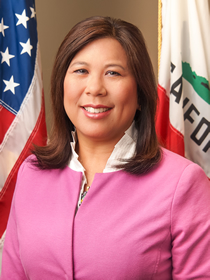
Yee's first official photo as State Controller

=== 2006 ===
California Board of Equalization 1st District Election, 2006
Party	Candidate	Votes	%
Democratic	Betty Yee (incumbent)	1,508,130	65.0
Republican	David Neighbors	677,942	29.2
Libertarian	Kennita Watson	68,405	2.9
Peace and Freedom	David Campbell	67,697	2.9

=== 2010 ===
California Board of Equalization 1st District Democratic Primary Election, 2010
Party	Candidate	Votes	%
Democratic	Betty Yee (incumbent)	564,903	74.7
Democratic	Ted Ford	149,166	19.7
Democratic	Alan Montgomery	43,075	5.6

California Board of Equalization 1st District Election, 2010
Party	Candidate	Votes	%
Democratic	Betty Yee (incumbent)	1,617,369	63.1
Republican	Kevin Scott	799,327	31.2
Libertarian	Kennita Watson	77,929	3.0
Peace and Freedom	Sherill Borg	71,183	2.7

=== 2014 ===
California State Controller Primary Election, 2014
Party	Candidate	Votes	%
Republican	Ashley Swearengin	1,001,473	24.8
Democratic	Betty Yee	878,195	21.7
Democratic	John Pérez	877,714	21.7
Republican	David Evans	850,109	21.0
Green	Laura Wells	231,352	5.7
Democratic	Tammy Blair	200,532	5.0

California State Controller Election, 2014
Party	Candidate	Votes	%
Democratic	Betty Yee	3,810,304	54.0
Republican	Ashley Swearengin	3,249,668	46.0

=== 2018 ===
Nonpartisan blanket primary results
Party	Candidate	Votes	%
Democratic	Betty Yee (incumbent)	4,033,208	62.1
Republican	Konstantinos Roditis	2,200,942	33.9
Peace and Freedom	Mary Lou Finley	261,876	4.0
Total votes		6,496,026	100.0

California State Controller election, 2018
Party	Candidate	Votes	%	±%
Democratic	Betty Yee (incumbent)	8,013,067	65.45	+11.48
Republican	Konstantinos Roditis	4,229,480	34.55	−11.48
Total votes		12,242,547	100.0	N/A
Democratic hold				

=== 2021 ===
California Democratic Party Female Vice Chair election, 2021
Party	Candidate	Votes	%
Democratic	Betty Yee	1,960	58.97
Democratic	Jenny Bach	1,306	39.29
Democratic	Blanca Gómez	58	1.74
Total votes		3,324 (Note: This total does not include the 45 voters who skipped this contest)	100.0

=== 2026 ===
2026 California gubernatorial election
Party	Candidate	Votes	%
Democratic	Xavier Becerra	2,591,857	27.98
Republican	Steve Hilton	2,277,318	24.59
Democratic	Tom Steyer	2,110,707	22.79
Republican	Chad Bianco	941,708	10.17
Democratic	Katie Porter	403,908	4.36
Democratic	Matt Mahan	327,537	3.54
Democratic	Antonio Villaraigosa	104,107	1.12
Democratic	Tony Thurmond	63,762	0.69
Peace and Freedom	Ramsey Robinson	51,803	0.56
Democratic	Betty Yee (withdrawn)	40,873	0.44
Democratic	Eric Swalwell (withdrawn)	28,164	0.30
Republican	Tim Nelson	23,712	0.26
Green	Butch Ware (write-in)	22,493	0.24
Republican	Randeep S. Dhillon	21,937	0.24
Democratic	Barack D. Obama Shaw	16,716	0.18
Democratic	Carolina Buhler	15,013	0.16
Republican	Leo Samuel Zacky	14,708	0.16
Republican	Gretha Solórzano	12,563	0.14
Democratic	Matthew Chase Levy	11,059	0.12
Libertarian	Tom Woodard (withdrawn)	9,328	0.10
Democratic	Erin "Zez" Zezulak	9,251	0.10
Democratic	Louis A. De Barraicua	8,851	0.10
Democratic	Mohammad Arif	8,458	0.09
Republican	Leo Naranjo IV	8,099	0.09
No party preference	Nancy D. Young	7,012	0.08
Republican	James Athans Jr.	6,633	0.07
No party preference	Joseph Cabrera	6,196	0.07
Republican	David Zickefoose	5,882	0.06
Democratic	Satish Rao	5,668	0.06
No party preference	Christine R. Sarmiento	5,643	0.06
No party preference	Jon Henderson	5,589	0.06
Republican	Alicia Olivia Lapp	5,370	0.06
No party preference	Amanda Martin	5,234	0.06
No party preference	Frederic C. Schultz	5,230	0.06
Republican	Rafael M. Hernandez	5,223	0.06
Democratic	Scott P. Shields	5,043	0.05
Democratic	Derek Grasty	4,994	0.05
Democratic	Larry Azevedo	4,675	0.05
No party preference	Elaine Culotti	4,483	0.05
Republican	Patricia De Luca Basualdo	4,064	0.04
No party preference	Mauro Alberto Orozco	4,052	0.04
Democratic	Raji Rab	3,606	0.04
Democratic	Sophia Edum-a-Sam	3,550	0.04
No party preference	Brent Maupin	3,132	0.03
Democratic	Akinyemi Agbede	3,037	0.03
No party preference	Lewis Herms	2,995	0.03
No party preference	Naomi Bar-Lev	2,744	0.03
No party preference	Daniel Mercuri	2,667	0.03
Republican	Ché Ahn (write-in)	2,419	0.03
Democratic	Gary Howard Kidgell	2,415	0.03
Democratic	Joel E. Jacob	2,350	0.03
Democratic	Thunder Parley	2,320	0.03
No party preference	Margaret Trowe	2,286	0.02
No party preference	LivingForGod AndCountry DeMott	2,206	0.02
No party preference	Reza Safarnejad	1,990	0.02
No party preference	Duane Terrence Loynes Jr.	1,905	0.02
No party preference	Don J. Grundmann	1,903	0.02
No party preference	Anne Komarovsk	1,535	0.02
No party preference	Dawit Kellel	1,360	0.01
No party preference	Sam Sandak	1,222	0.01
No party preference	Max Fomin	842	0.01
No party preference	Lukasz Adam Filinski	527	0.01
No party preference	Serge Fiankan	488	0.01
No party preference	Sean Forbes (write-in)	22	0.00
Democratic	Jibri J. Peavy (write-in)	10	0.00
No party preference	Dirk Langer (write-in)	8	0.00
Democratic	Kalid Meky (write-in)	5	0.00
No party preference	Michael J. Dilger (write-in)	1	0.00
Total votes		9,262,468	100.00

== Notes ==
Political offices
Preceded by Carole Migden	Member of the California State Board of Equalization from the 1st district 2004–2015	Succeeded by George Runner
Preceded by John Chiang	Controller of California; 2015–2023	Succeeded by Malia Cohen
