= 2006 California gubernatorial election =

- November 7, 2006
- Turnout: 32.77% ▼28.43pp
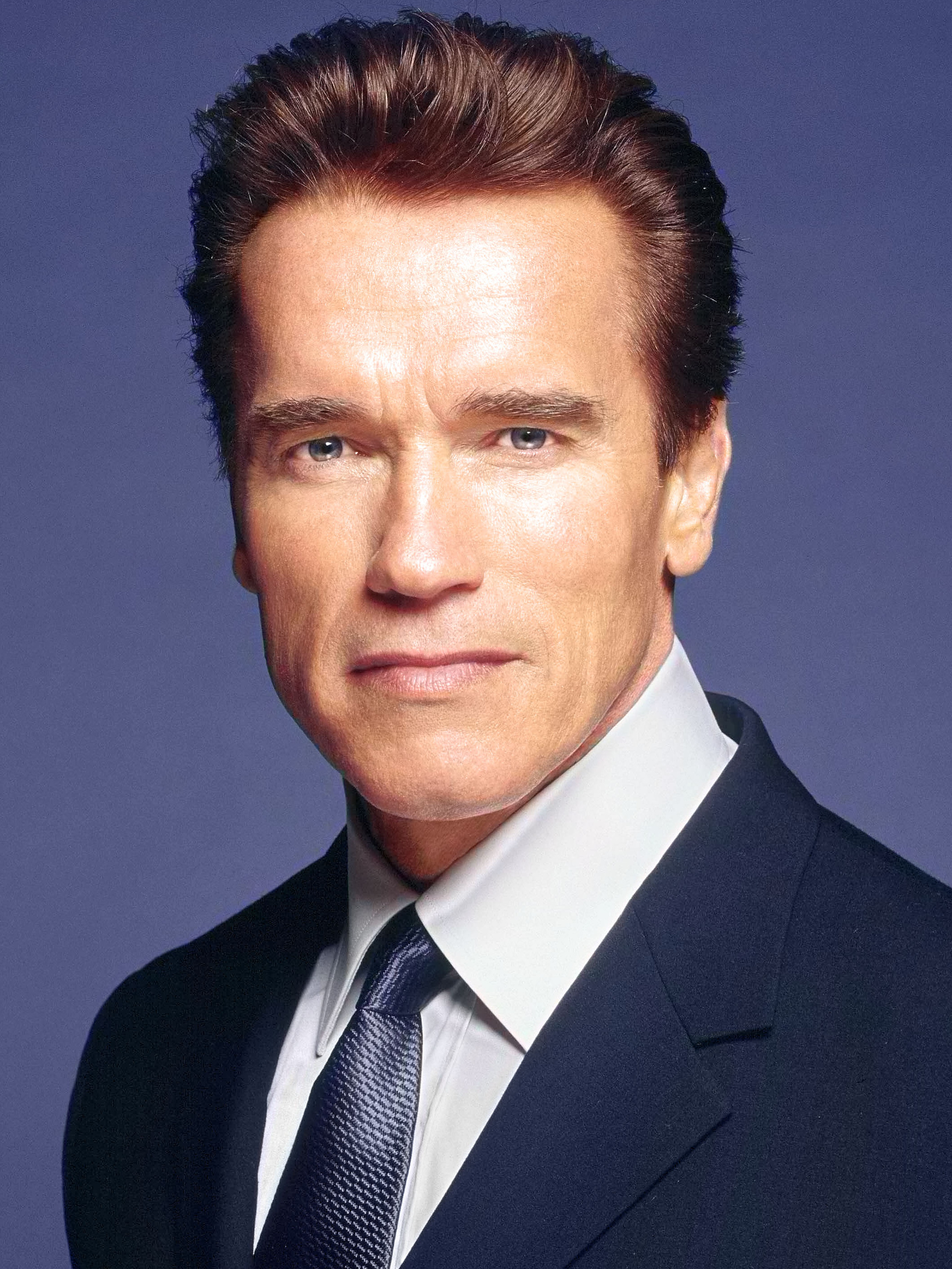

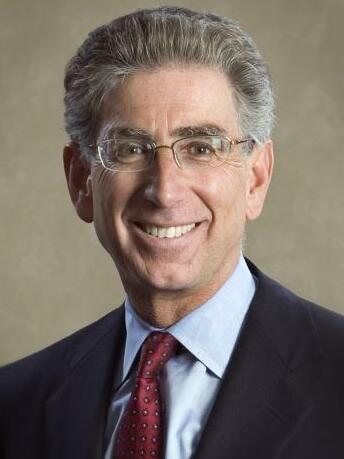
Nominee	Arnold Schwarzenegger	Phil Angelides
Party	Republican	Democratic
Popular vote	4,850,157	3,376,732
Percentage	55.88%	38.91%
- Schwarzenegger: 40–50% 50–60% 60–70% 70–80% Angelides: 40–50% 50–60% 60–70%
Governor before election
Arnold Schwarzenegger
Republican
Elected Governor
Arnold Schwarzenegger
Republican

The 2006 California gubernatorial election occurred in the US state on November 7, 2006. The primary elections took place on June 6, 2006. The incumbent Republican Governor, Arnold Schwarzenegger, won re-election for his first and only full term. His main opponent was California State Treasurer Phil Angelides, the California Democratic Party nominee. Peter Camejo was the California Green Party nominee, Janice Jordan was the Peace and Freedom Party nominee, Art Olivier was the California Libertarian Party nominee, and Edward C. Noonan was the California American Independent Party nominee.

Under the state constitution, the governor serves a four-year term, with a maximum term limit of two four-year terms for life, regardless of whether or not they are consecutive or nonconsecutive. Arnold Schwarzenegger was elected in a 2003 recall election and served out the remainder of predecessor Gray Davis's term ending in 2007; Schwarzenegger was therefore eligible to serve until 2011. As of 2026, this and the concurrent Insurance Commissioner election mark the most recent time Republicans have won a statewide election in California, the most recent time a Republican was officially elected California governor, and the last election in which a California governor and lieutenant governor of opposite political parties were elected.

Exit polls showed Schwarzenegger won the vote of White (63%–32%) and Asian Americans (62%–37%), while Angelides won among African Americans (70%–27%) and Latinos (56%–39%).

== Primary election ==
Bar graph of statewide results

Results by county

The period for candidate nominations closed on March 24, 2006.

=== Republican ===
==== Candidates ====
- Jeffrey Burns – general contractor
- Bill Chambers – railroad switchman
- Robert C. Newman II – psychologist and farmer
- Arnold Schwarzenegger – incumbent Governor of California

Republican Schwarzenegger faced token opposition and won overwhelmingly in the primary held on June 6, 2006.

==== Results ====
Republican primary results
Party	Candidate	Votes	%
Republican	Arnold Schwarzenegger (incumbent)	1,724,296	89.99%
Republican	Robert C. Newman II	68,663	3.58%
Republican	Bill Chambers	65,488	3.42%
Republican	Jeffrey R. Burns	57,652	3.01%
Total votes		1,916,099	100.00%

=== Democratic ===
==== Candidates ====
- Phil Angelides – California State Treasurer; former State Democratic Chair and developer
- Barbara Becnel – Executive Director of Neighborhood House of North Richmond; founder of Save Stanley Tookie Williams campaign
- Joe Brouilette – high school teacher
- Edie Bukewihge – writer and publisher
- Jerald Gerst – physician
- Vibert Greene – engineer
- Frank Macaluso – medical doctor
- Michael Strimling – attorney
- Steve Westly – California State Controller; former Internet executive

The two front-runners for the Democratic nomination were Angelides and California State Controller Steve Westly. A pre-election poll had Westly leading Angelides by six percentage points. The Field Poll conducted on April 17, 2006, showed that both Democratic candidates had low recognition factors amongst the state's electorate, with only 45% having any opinion on Angelides and 40% for Westly. Of registered Democrats surveyed, 59% said they didn't know enough about Angelides to have any opinion about him, with 58% saying the same for Westly. The Los Angeles Times reported that the race for the Democratic nomination was a virtual tie, with Angelides leading Westly by three percentage points (37%–34%), within the 3% margin of error. Unusually, 28% of Democratic voters were undecided, and both candidates tried to earn the undecided vote.

Angelides reported a recent increase in support for his campaign and gained union support as well as support from the "core" liberal constituency. The California Democratic Party endorsed him prior to the primary, despite most polls showing that Westly would fare much better against Schwarzenegger in the general election. However, many registered Democrats believed that Westly had a greater chance of winning against incumbent governor Schwarzenegger and felt that he had a slightly "more positive" image. In the end, Angelides won 47.9% of the vote to Westly's 43.4%. The turnout for the primary, was a record low 33.6%, far below the 38% predicted by the Secretary of State, with the turnout of valid ballots cast on election day at 28%.

==== Polling ====
Source	Date	Westly	Angelides
Survey USA	June 5, 2006	36%	44%
Survey USA	June 2, 2006	37%	41%
Field Poll	June 2, 2006	35%	34%
LA Times Poll	May 27, 2006	34%	37%
Survey USA	May 25, 2006	32%	44%
Public Policy Institute of California	May 25, 2006	32%	35%
Survey USA	May 8, 2006	31%	41%
LA Times Poll	April 29, 2006	33%	20%
Public Policy Institute of California	April 27, 2006	26%	20%
Field Poll	April 17, 2006	37%	26%
Public Policy Institute of California	March 30, 2006	23%	22%
Field Poll	November 3, 2005	26%	37%
Field Poll	September 7, 2005	22%	32%
Field Poll	June 29, 2005	28%	37%
Field Poll	February 25, 2005	11%	15%

==== Results ====
Democratic primary results by county Angelides: 40–50%; 50–60%; Westly: 40–50%; 50–60%; 60–70%

Democratic primary results by congressional district Angelides: 40–50%; 50–60%; 60–70%; Westly: 40–50%; 50–60%

Democratic primary results
Party	Candidate	Votes	%
Democratic	Phil Angelides	1,202,884	48.00%
Democratic	Steve Westly	1,081,971	43.17%
Democratic	Barbara Becnel	66,550	2.66%
Democratic	Joe Brouillette	42,077	1.68%
Democratic	Michael Strimling	35,122	1.40%
Democratic	Frank A. Macaluso Jr.	30,871	1.23%
Democratic	Vibert Greene	25,747	1.03%
Democratic	Jerald Robert Gerst	21,039	0.84%
Total votes		2,506,261	100.00%

=== Minor parties ===
==== Green ====
Green primary results
Party	Candidate	Votes	%
Green	Peter Miguel Camejo	33,546	100.00%
Total votes		33,546	100.00%

==== Libertarian ====
Libertarian primary
Party	Candidate	Votes	%
Libertarian	Art Olivier	16,445	100.00%
Total votes		16,445	100.00%

==== Peace and Freedom ====
Peace and Freedom primary
Party	Candidate	Votes	%
Peace and Freedom	Janice Jordan	3,849	100.00%
Total votes		3,849	100.00%

==== American Independent ====
American Independent primary results
Party	Candidate	Votes	%
American Independent	Edward C. Noonan	25,096	100.00%
Total votes		25,096	100.00%

== General election ==
=== Candidates ===
- Phil Angelides (Democratic) – California State Treasurer, Ex-State Democratic Chair & Developer
- Peter Camejo (Green) – 2002/2003 Green Party gubernatorial candidate, 2004 independent vice presidential candidate (Ralph Nader's running mate)
- Janice Jordan (Peace and Freedom) – 2004 Peace and Freedom Party vice presidential candidate (Leonard Peltier's running mate)
- Edward C. Noonan (American Independent) – computer shop owner
- Art Olivier (Libertarian) – former mayor of Bellflower, 2000 Libertarian Party vice presidential candidate (Harry Browne's running mate)
- Arnold Schwarzenegger (Republican) – incumbent Governor of California, actor, businessman

=== Campaign ===
Schwarzenegger's decision to call the 2005 special election, as well as his propositions dealing with teachers' and nurses' unions and other political missteps, brought his approval rating down to 39% by April 2006, though he ended up solidly defeating his opponents. During his first two years, he came under fire from some conservatives for supporting several taxes on Californians, and from some liberals for refusing to sign a bill allowing gay marriage, and his support for several controversial propositions in 2005. Later, Schwarzenegger's popularity with voters rebounded and he won reelection by a wide margin.

=== Predictions ===
Source	Ranking	As of
The Cook Political Report	Lean R	November 6, 2006
Sabato's Crystal Ball	Likely R	November 6, 2006
Rothenberg Political Report	Safe R	November 2, 2006
Real Clear Politics	Likely R	November 6, 2006

=== Polling ===
Source	Date	Arnold Schwarzenegger (R)	Phil Angelides (D)	Peter Camejo (G)	Art Olivier (L)
Field Poll	November 1, 2006	49%	33%		
Zogby/WSJ	October 17, 2006	47%	40%		
Zogby/WSJ	September 28, 2006	43%	34%	8%	4%
Field Poll	September 27, 2006	44%	34%		
Rasmussen	September 12, 2006	47%	39%		
Zogby/WSJ	September 11, 2006	40%	35%	6%	4%
Rasmussen	August 31, 2006	48%	42%		
Public Policy Institute of California	August 30, 2006	45%	32%		
Survey USA	August 28, 2006	52%	38%		
Zogby/WSJ	August 28, 2006	45%	40%		
Rasmussen	August 1, 2006	47%	41%		
Public Policy Institute of California	July 26, 2006	43%	30%		
Field Poll	July 25, 2006	45%	37%		
Zogby/WSJ	July 24, 2006	42%	44%		
Rasmussen	July 13, 2006	44%	46%		
Survey & Policy Institute	July 6, 2006	44%	37%		
Zogby/WSJ	June 21, 2006	45%	45%		
Field Poll	June 2, 2006	46%	39%		
LA Times Poll	May 28, 2006	45%	46%		
Public Policy Institute of California	May 25, 2006	38%	38%		
Rasmussen	May 23, 2006	45%	45%		
LA Times Poll	April 29, 2006	43%	43%		
Rasmussen	April 17, 2006	49%	36%		
Field Poll	April 14, 2006	44%	40%		
Public Policy Institute of California	March 30, 2006	41%	29%		
Rasmussen	March 23, 2006	44%	45%		
Field Poll	March 2, 2006	39%	39%		
Rasmussen	February 13, 2006	40%	41%		
Rasmussen	January 25, 2006	39%	41%		
Rasmussen	December 16, 2005	40%	44%		
Field Poll	November 3, 2005	41%	47%		
Field Poll	August 29, 2005	40%	43%		
Field Poll	June 13, 2005	42%	46%		
Field Poll	February 25, 2005	52%	35%		

Hypothetical polling

Schwarzenegger v Westly

Source	Date	Schwarzenegger (R)	Westly (D)
Field Poll	June 2, 2006	44%	42%
LA Times Poll	May 28, 2006	40%	50%
Public Policy Institute of California	May 25, 2006	36%	36%
Rasmussen	May 23, 2006	44%	46%
LA Times Poll	April 29, 2006	39%	48%
Rasmussen	April 17, 2006	48%	40%
Field Poll	April 14, 2006	43%	43%
Public Policy Institute of California	March 30, 2006	39%	31%
Rasmussen	March 23, 2006	44%	45%
Field Poll	March 2, 2006	37%	41%
Rasmussen	February 13, 2006	39%	34%
Field Poll	February 2, 2006	52%	33%
Rasmussen	January 25, 2006	39%	40%
Rasmussen	December 16, 2005	39%	46%
Field Poll	November 3, 2005	40%	46%
Field Poll	August 29, 2005	39%	42%
Field Poll	June 13, 2005	40%	44%

=== Results ===

California gubernatorial election, 2006
Party	Candidate	Votes	%	±%
Republican	Arnold Schwarzenegger (incumbent)	4,850,157	55.88%	+7.30%
Democratic	Phil Angelides	3,376,732	38.91%	+7.43%
Green	Peter Miguel Camejo	205,995	2.37%	−0.42%
Libertarian	Art Olivier	114,329	1.32%	−0.84%
Peace and Freedom	Janice Jordan	69,934	0.81%	
American Independent	Edward C. Noonan	61,901	0.71%	−1.00%
Republican	Robert Newman (write-in)	219	0.00%	
Independent	James Harris (write-in)	46	0.00%	
Independent	Donald Etkes (write-in)	43	0.00%	
Independent	Elisha Shapiro (write-in)	36	0.00%	
Independent	Vibert Greene (write-in)	18	0.00%	
Independent	Dealphria Tarver (write-in)	6	0.00%	
Majority		1,473,425	16.98%	
Total votes		8,679,416	100.00%	
Republican hold		Swing	+0.13%	

==== By county ====
County	Arnold Schwarzenegger Republican		Phil Angelides Democratic		Peter Camejo Green		Art Olivier Libertarian		Janice Jordan PFP		Edward C. Noonan AIP		All Others Write-in		Margin		Total votes cast
County	#	%	#	%	#	%	#	%	#	%	#	%	#	%	#	%	Total votes cast
Alameda	148,322	36.59%	229,217	56.54%	18,236	4.50%	3,784	0.93%	3,569	0.88%	2,231	0.55%	19	0.00%	-80,895	-19.96%	405,378
Alpine	295	54.23%	218	40.07%	14	2.57%	8	1.47%	6	1.10%	3	0.55%	0	0.00%	77	14.15%	544
Amador	10,755	72.09%	3,354	22.48%	390	2.61%	148	0.99%	100	0.67%	172	1.15%	0	0.00%	7,401	49.61%	14,919
Butte	45,591	65.82%	18,672	26.96%	2,912	4.20%	856	1.24%	640	0.92%	593	0.86%	4	0.01%	26,919	38.86%	69,268
Calaveras	12,691	70.44%	4,268	23.69%	490	2.72%	238	1.32%	130	0.72%	199	1.10%	0	0.00%	8,423	46.75%	18,016
Colusa	3,665	73.76%	1,104	22.22%	94	1.89%	46	0.93%	30	0.60%	30	0.60%	0	0.00%	2,561	51.54%	4,969
Contra Costa	158,565	52.42%	128,578	42.50%	8,529	2.82%	2,725	0.90%	2,169	0.72%	1,932	0.64%	15	0.00%	29,987	9.91%	302,513
Del Norte	3,639	54.85%	2,531	38.15%	133	2.00%	121	1.82%	85	1.28%	125	1.88%	0	0.00%	1,108	16.70%	6,634
El Dorado	49,771	73.37%	14,535	21.43%	1,911	2.82%	752	1.11%	365	0.54%	500	0.74%	3	0.00%	35,236	51.94%	67,837
Fresno	116,534	66.08%	53,605	30.39%	2,324	1.32%	1,449	0.82%	1,418	0.80%	1,031	0.58%	2	0.00%	62,929	35.68%	176,363
Glenn	5,775	76.50%	1,421	18.82%	110	1.46%	102	1.35%	70	0.93%	71	0.94%	0	0.00%	4,354	57.68%	7,549
Humboldt	23,282	48.22%	20,070	41.56%	3,241	6.71%	702	1.45%	572	1.18%	419	0.87%	0	0.00%	3,212	6.65%	48,286
Imperial	10,363	46.73%	10,024	45.21%	706	3.18%	273	1.23%	569	2.57%	239	1.08%	0	0.00%	339	1.53%	22,174
Inyo	4,180	64.39%	1,892	29.14%	132	2.03%	130	2.00%	66	1.02%	92	1.42%	0	0.00%	2,288	35.24%	6,492
Kern	108,253	72.06%	35,512	23.64%	1,752	1.17%	1,988	1.32%	1,287	0.86%	1,421	0.95%	9	0.01%	72,741	48.42%	150,222
Kings	15,683	68.47%	6,344	27.70%	219	0.96%	247	1.08%	244	1.07%	167	0.73%	0	0.00%	9,339	40.77%	22,904
Lake	10,930	56.26%	7,031	36.19%	615	3.17%	323	1.66%	275	1.42%	255	1.31%	0	0.00%	3,899	20.07%	19,429
Lassen	5,665	66.03%	2,353	27.42%	158	1.84%	197	2.30%	96	1.12%	111	1.29%	0	0.00%	3,312	38.60%	8,580
Los Angeles	907,919	46.06%	967,149	49.07%	37,029	1.88%	28,429	1.44%	16,001	0.81%	14,519	0.74%	30	0.00%	-59,230	-3.00%	1,971,076
Madera	21,416	71.12%	7,473	24.82%	353	1.17%	324	1.08%	253	0.84%	285	0.95%	9	0.03%	13,943	46.30%	30,113
Marin	48,439	45.81%	50,441	47.70%	4,724	4.47%	1,060	1.00%	670	0.63%	408	0.39%	1	0.00%	-2,002	-1.89%	105,743
Mariposa	5,074	66.82%	1,985	26.14%	204	2.69%	139	1.83%	73	0.96%	118	1.55%	0	0.00%	3,089	40.68%	7,593
Mendocino	14,002	45.41%	13,790	44.72%	1,869	6.06%	463	1.50%	401	1.30%	309	1.00%	0	0.00%	212	0.69%	30,834
Merced	26,231	62.52%	14,027	33.43%	543	1.29%	378	0.90%	425	1.01%	355	0.85%	0	0.00%	12,204	29.09%	41,959
Modoc	2,829	75.20%	723	19.22%	47	1.25%	71	1.89%	57	1.52%	35	0.93%	0	0.00%	2,106	55.98%	3,762
Mono	2,315	61.83%	1,176	31.41%	100	2.67%	87	2.32%	31	0.83%	35	0.93%	0	0.00%	1,139	30.42%	3,744
Monterey	46,882	53.33%	35,769	40.69%	2,646	3.01%	928	1.06%	852	0.97%	829	0.94%	0	0.00%	11,113	12.64%	87,906
Napa	23,187	54.57%	16,504	38.84%	1,559	3.67%	520	1.22%	366	0.86%	352	0.83%	0	0.00%	6,683	15.73%	42,488
Nevada	28,570	66.03%	11,833	27.35%	1,982	4.58%	461	1.07%	236	0.55%	183	0.42%	3	0.01%	16,737	38.68%	43,268
Orange	507,413	69.70%	185,388	25.46%	9,646	1.32%	15,328	2.11%	5,419	0.74%	4,825	0.66%	12	0.00%	322,025	44.23%	728,031
Placer	91,972	74.38%	26,723	21.61%	2,501	2.02%	1,098	0.89%	588	0.48%	770	0.62%	0	0.00%	65,249	52.77%	123,652
Plumas	6,160	69.53%	2,194	24.76%	232	2.62%	97	1.09%	70	0.79%	107	1.21%	0	0.00%	3,966	44.76%	8,860
Riverside	251,962	65.49%	115,803	30.10%	4,314	1.12%	6,224	1.62%	3,070	0.80%	3,327	0.86%	44	0.01%	136,159	35.39%	384,744
Sacramento	218,889	60.45%	123,685	34.16%	11,170	3.08%	2,942	0.81%	2,636	0.73%	2,754	0.76%	19	0.01%	95,204	26.29%	362,095
San Benito	8,208	57.08%	5,400	37.55%	335	2.33%	159	1.11%	126	0.88%	151	1.05%	0	0.00%	2,808	19.53%	14,379
San Bernardino	212,200	61.63%	114,388	33.22%	4,387	1.27%	6,455	1.87%	3,539	1.03%	3,278	0.95%	54	0.02%	97,812	28.41%	344,301
San Diego	509,059	65.49%	234,938	30.22%	13,653	1.76%	9,444	1.21%	5,425	0.70%	4,732	0.61%	54	0.01%	274,121	35.27%	777,305
San Francisco	72,722	29.75%	153,335	62.72%	13,186	5.39%	2,390	0.98%	1,911	0.78%	913	0.37%	11	0.00%	-80,613	-32.97%	244,468
San Joaquin	83,952	60.32%	49,868	35.83%	2,026	1.46%	1,138	0.82%	1,174	0.84%	1,007	0.72%	3	0.00%	34,084	24.49%	139,168
San Luis Obispo	61,842	63.56%	30,568	31.42%	2,319	2.38%	1,135	1.17%	764	0.79%	660	0.68%	4	0.00%	31,274	32.14%	97,292
San Mateo	96,478	47.12%	97,092	47.42%	6,822	3.33%	2,048	1.00%	1,335	0.65%	975	0.48%	14	0.01%	-614	-0.30%	204,764
Santa Barbara	73,677	60.01%	42,880	34.92%	3,149	2.56%	1,365	1.11%	1,054	0.86%	654	0.53%	2	0.00%	30,797	25.08%	122,781
Santa Clara	225,132	52.16%	185,037	42.87%	10,932	2.53%	5,034	1.17%	2,942	0.68%	2,559	0.59%	19	0.00%	40,095	9.29%	431,655
Santa Cruz	37,866	41.99%	43,619	48.36%	6,156	6.83%	1,154	1.28%	801	0.89%	587	0.65%	6	0.01%	-5,753	-6.38%	90,189
Shasta	43,436	73.92%	12,434	21.16%	808	1.38%	802	1.36%	627	1.07%	655	1.11%	1	0.00%	31,002	52.76%	58,763
Sierra	1,131	70.60%	353	22.03%	62	3.87%	34	2.12%	9	0.56%	13	0.81%	0	0.00%	778	48.56%	1,602
Siskiyou	10,916	65.64%	4,615	27.75%	383	2.30%	321	1.93%	173	1.04%	222	1.33%	1	0.01%	6,301	37.89%	16,631
Solano	55,130	53.15%	43,501	41.94%	2,194	2.12%	1,092	1.05%	973	0.94%	835	0.81%	1	0.00%	11,629	11.21%	103,726
Sonoma	81,608	47.03%	77,392	44.60%	8,647	4.98%	2,360	1.36%	2,099	1.21%	1,404	0.81%	4	0.00%	4,216	2.43%	173,514
Stanislaus	67,427	64.91%	31,981	30.79%	1,589	1.53%	937	0.90%	974	0.94%	954	0.92%	10	0.01%	35,446	34.12%	103,872
Sutter	17,393	72.73%	5,487	22.95%	357	1.49%	249	1.04%	209	0.87%	218	0.91%	0	0.00%	11,906	49.79%	23,913
Tehama	13,442	74.66%	3,666	20.36%	217	1.21%	248	1.38%	191	1.06%	241	1.34%	0	0.00%	9,776	54.30%	18,005
Trinity	3,819	64.61%	1,614	27.31%	243	4.11%	113	1.91%	85	1.44%	37	0.63%	0	0.00%	2,205	37.30%	5,911
Tulare	48,607	70.72%	17,571	25.57%	801	1.17%	535	0.78%	458	0.67%	757	1.10%	1	0.00%	31,036	45.16%	68,730
Tuolumne	14,836	70.18%	5,105	24.15%	569	2.69%	234	1.11%	180	0.85%	216	1.02%	1	0.00%	9,731	46.03%	21,141
Ventura	134,862	61.03%	75,790	34.30%	3,329	1.51%	3,773	1.71%	1,525	0.69%	1,680	0.76%	6	0.00%	59,072	26.73%	220,965
Yolo	29,073	53.39%	21,733	39.91%	2,602	4.78%	483	0.89%	391	0.72%	170	0.31%	6	0.01%	7,340	13.48%	54,458
Yuba	10,122	72.62%	2,973	21.33%	344	2.47%	188	1.35%	130	0.93%	181	1.30%	0	0.00%	7,149	51.29%	13,938
Total	4,850,157	55.88%	3,376,732	38.910%	205,995	2.37%	114,329	1.32%	69,934	0.81%	61,901	0.71%	368	0.00%	1,473,425	16.98%	8,679,416

Counties that flipped from Democratic to Republican

- Mendocino (largest municipality: Ukiah)
- Santa Clara (largest municipality: San Jose)
- Sonoma (largest municipality: Santa Rosa)

Counties that flipped from Republican to Democratic

- Los Angeles (largest municipality: Los Angeles)

==== By congressional district ====
Schwarzenegger won 37 of 53 congressional districts, including 13 held by Democrats.

District	Schwarzenegger	Angelides	Representative
1st	51.0%	40.9%	Mike Thompson
2nd	70.5%	23.7%	Wally Herger
3rd	68.6%	26.8%	Dan Lungren
4th	72.2%	22.8%	John Doolittle
5th	49.6%	43.8%	Doris Matsui
6th	45.9%	46.4%	Lynn Woolsey
7th	44.0%	50.4%	George Miller
8th	27.9%	64.3%	Nancy Pelosi
9th	24.0%	67.3%	Barbara Lee
10th	56.2%	38.7%	Ellen Tauscher
11th	65.3%	31.1%	Richard Pombo (109th Congress)
11th	65.3%	31.1%	Jerry McNerney (110th Congress)
12th	44.2%	50.5%	Tom Lantos
13th	42.4%	52.1%	Pete Stark
14th	50.9%	42.7%	Anna Eshoo
15th	53.6%	41.3%	Mike Honda
16th	49.6%	46.1%	Zoe Lofgren
17th	48.1%	44.6%	Sam Farr
18th	55.7%	39.7%	Dennis Cardoza
19th	69.3%	26.6%	George Radanovich
20th	53.7%	41.5%	Jim Costa
21st	71.6%	25.0%	Devin Nunes
22nd	73.8%	22.0%	Bill Thomas (109th Congress)
22nd	73.8%	22.0%	Kevin McCarthy (110th Congress)
23rd	53.6%	41.1%	Lois Capps
24th	65.8%	29.6%	Elton Gallegly
25th	66.4%	28.5%	Buck McKeon
26th	65.1%	30.5%	David Dreier
27th	52.7%	42.3%	Brad Sherman
28th	40.2%	54.7%	Howard Berman
29th	50.3%	44.4%	Adam Schiff
30th	49.8%	45.9%	Henry Waxman
31st	26.8%	66.8%	Xavier Becerra
32nd	41.5%	53.8%	Hilda Solis
33rd	25.6%	69.4%	Diane Watson
34th	32.4%	62.6%	Lucille Roybal-Allard
35th	27.9%	67.3%	Maxine Waters
36th	52.5%	42.6%	Jane Harman
37th	33.9%	60.6%	Juanita Millender-McDonald
38th	37.1%	58.3%	Grace Napolitano
39th	46.1%	49.3%	Linda Sánchez
40th	69.0%	26.0%	Ed Royce
41st	68.6%	26.6%	Jerry Lewis
42nd	71.1%	24.6%	Gary Miller
43rd	45.4%	48.7%	Joe Baca
44th	66.8%	28.4%	Ken Calvert
45th	65.2%	31.0%	Mary Bono
46th	68.9%	26.3%	Dana Rohrabacher
47th	53.6%	40.3%	Loretta Sanchez
48th	71.5%	24.0%	John Campbell
49th	71.4%	24.1%	Darrell Issa
50th	69.9%	26.3%	Brian Bilbray
51st	51.6%	43.1%	Bob Filner
52nd	72.4%	24.3%	Duncan L. Hunter
53rd	53.4%	40.6%	Susan Davis

==== By city ====
By municipality

Official outcome by city and unincorporated areas of counties, of which Schwarzenegger won 426 & Angelides won 108.
City	County	Arnold Schwarzenegger Republican		Phil Angelides Democratic		Various candidates Other parties		Margin		Total Votes	2003 to 2006 Swing % (Note: Republican margins are compared to the "Yes" margins from the 2003 recall vote, and Democratic margins are compared to the "No" margins from the 2003 recall vote.)
City	County	#	%	#	%	#	%	#	%	Total Votes	2003 to 2006 Swing %
Alameda	Alameda	9,701	39.53%	13,024	53.07%	1,818	7.41%	-3,323	-13.54%	24,543	24.96%
Albany	Alameda	1,485	22.61%	4,434	67.51%	649	9.88%	-2,949	-44.90%	6,568	25.85%
Berkeley	Alameda	7,302	16.33%	32,205	72.04%	5,195	11.62%	-24,903	-55.71%	44,702	22.15%
Dublin	Alameda	5,820	58.15%	3,757	37.54%	431	4.31%	2,063	20.61%	10,008	18.48%
Emeryville	Alameda	537	21.79%	1,703	69.12%	224	9.09%	-1,166	-47.32%	2,464	15.77%
Fremont	Alameda	23,260	49.42%	21,379	45.43%	2,425	5.15%	1,881	4.00%	47,064	19.17%
Hayward	Alameda	9,010	36.30%	14,453	58.23%	1,356	5.46%	-5,443	-21.93%	24,819	10.61%
Livermore	Alameda	16,148	63.60%	7,931	31.24%	1,312	5.17%	8,217	32.36%	25,391	21.30%
Newark	Alameda	3,970	43.60%	4,666	51.25%	469	5.15%	-696	-7.64%	9,105	10.79%
Oakland	Alameda	21,587	20.14%	76,676	71.55%	8,906	8.31%	-55,089	-51.40%	107,169	20.16%
Piedmont	Alameda	2,843	50.01%	2,495	43.89%	347	6.10%	348	6.12%	5,685	40.95%
Pleasanton	Alameda	15,791	64.45%	7,800	31.83%	911	3.72%	7,991	32.61%	24,502	26.15%
San Leandro	Alameda	8,309	37.72%	12,568	57.06%	1,149	5.22%	-4,259	-19.34%	22,026	15.50%
Union City	Alameda	5,238	37.92%	7,952	57.57%	622	4.50%	-2,714	-19.65%	13,812	11.68%
Unincorporated Area	Alameda	17,321	46.19%	18,174	48.46%	2,006	5.35%	-853	-2.27%	37,501	17.43%
Unincorporated Area	Alpine	295	54.23%	218	40.07%	31	5.70%	77	14.15%	544	10.13%
Amador	Amador	64	68.82%	26	27.96%	3	3.23%	38	40.86%	93	9.75%
Ione	Amador	926	72.17%	296	23.07%	61	4.75%	630	49.10%	1,283	1.42%
Jackson	Amador	1,218	69.96%	442	25.39%	81	4.65%	776	44.57%	1,741	20.23%
Plymouth	Amador	284	73.58%	79	20.47%	23	5.96%	205	53.11%	386	13.17%
Sutter Creek	Amador	751	67.35%	305	27.35%	59	5.29%	446	40.00%	1,115	15.02%
Unincorporated Area	Amador	7,512	72.92%	2,206	21.42%	583	5.66%	5,306	51.51%	10,301	14.98%
Biggs	Butte	296	73.09%	95	23.46%	14	3.46%	201	49.63%	405	-0.13%
Chico	Butte	13,178	57.27%	7,679	33.37%	2,152	9.35%	5,499	23.90%	23,009	13.16%
Gridley	Butte	863	62.00%	460	33.05%	69	4.96%	403	28.95%	1,392	-8.80%
Oroville	Butte	2,130	66.73%	864	27.07%	198	6.20%	1,266	39.66%	3,192	3.28%
Paradise	Butte	7,306	68.76%	2,616	24.62%	704	6.63%	4,690	44.14%	10,626	10.88%
Unincorporated Area	Butte	21,818	71.21%	6,958	22.71%	1,864	6.08%	14,860	48.50%	30,640	10.90%
Angels	Calaveras	1,110	74.00%	318	21.20%	72	4.80%	792	52.80%	1,500	22.52%
Unincorporated Area	Calaveras	11,581	70.12%	3,950	23.92%	985	5.96%	7,631	46.20%	16,516	10.62%
Colusa	Colusa	1,131	73.39%	350	22.71%	60	3.89%	781	50.68%	1,541	8.16%
Williams	Colusa	348	62.93%	182	32.91%	23	4.16%	166	30.02%	553	-12.34%
Unincorporated Area	Colusa	2,186	76.03%	572	19.90%	117	4.07%	1,614	56.14%	2,875	0.40%
Antioch	Contra Costa	10,383	48.52%	10,152	47.44%	863	4.03%	231	1.08%	21,398	5.46%
Brentwood	Contra Costa	7,851	62.42%	4,259	33.86%	467	3.71%	3,592	28.56%	12,577	12.43%
Clayton	Contra Costa	3,473	68.47%	1,413	27.86%	186	3.67%	2,060	40.62%	5,072	26.03%
Concord	Contra Costa	17,295	52.69%	13,721	41.80%	1,807	5.51%	3,574	10.89%	32,823	20.51%
Danville	Contra Costa	12,960	71.57%	4,599	25.40%	550	3.04%	8,361	46.17%	18,109	31.62%
El Cerrito	Contra Costa	2,601	27.35%	6,069	63.82%	840	8.83%	-3,468	-36.47%	9,510	24.99%
Hercules	Contra Costa	2,320	38.27%	3,505	57.82%	237	3.91%	-1,185	-19.55%	6,062	15.89%
Lafayette	Contra Costa	6,982	61.53%	3,805	33.53%	561	4.94%	3,177	28.00%	11,348	38.35%
Martinez	Contra Costa	6,777	50.80%	5,718	42.86%	846	6.34%	1,059	7.94%	13,341	21.99%
Moraga	Contra Costa	4,651	63.76%	2,317	31.76%	327	4.48%	2,334	31.99%	7,295	36.96%
Oakley	Contra Costa	3,310	53.69%	2,578	41.82%	277	4.49%	732	11.87%	6,165	2.65%
Orinda	Contra Costa	5,861	62.17%	3,112	33.01%	454	4.82%	2,749	29.16%	9,427	38.88%
Pinole	Contra Costa	2,424	41.79%	3,085	53.19%	291	5.02%	-661	-11.40%	5,800	15.82%
Pittsburg	Contra Costa	4,227	37.01%	6,706	58.71%	489	4.28%	-2,479	-21.70%	11,422	7.68%
Pleasant Hill	Contra Costa	6,210	51.81%	5,042	42.06%	735	6.13%	1,168	9.74%	11,987	24.68%
Richmond	Contra Costa	5,131	24.29%	14,535	68.80%	1,460	6.91%	-9,404	-44.51%	21,126	15.90%
San Pablo	Contra Costa	882	24.20%	2,482	68.09%	281	7.71%	-1,600	-43.90%	3,645	4.26%
San Ramon	Contra Costa	11,406	64.67%	5,588	31.69%	642	3.64%	5,818	32.99%	17,636	25.03%
Walnut Creek	Contra Costa	16,547	58.66%	10,296	36.50%	1,367	4.85%	6,251	22.16%	28,210	33.26%
Unincorporated Area	Contra Costa	27,274	55.05%	19,596	39.55%	2,675	5.40%	7,678	15.50%	49,545	22.70%
Crescent City	Del Norte	377	48.77%	344	44.50%	52	6.73%	33	4.27%	773	-18.03%
Unincorporated Area	Del Norte	3,262	55.66%	2,187	37.31%	412	7.03%	1,075	18.34%	5,861	-6.74%
Placerville	El Dorado	2,213	67.74%	817	25.01%	237	7.25%	1,396	42.73%	3,267	8.75%
South Lake Tahoe	El Dorado	2,330	55.45%	1,576	37.51%	296	7.04%	754	17.94%	4,202	9.04%
Unincorporated Area	El Dorado	45,228	74.92%	12,142	20.11%	2,995	4.96%	33,086	54.81%	60,365	9.07%
Clovis	Fresno	18,279	75.98%	5,152	21.41%	628	2.61%	13,127	54.56%	24,059	1.89%
Coalinga	Fresno	1,281	63.79%	631	31.42%	96	4.78%	650	32.37%	2,008	-6.35%
Firebaugh	Fresno	385	48.98%	362	46.06%	39	4.96%	23	2.93%	786	-15.02%
Fowler	Fresno	605	58.79%	386	37.51%	38	3.69%	219	21.28%	1,029	-0.02%
Fresno	Fresno	52,298	61.99%	28,794	34.13%	3,268	3.87%	23,504	27.86%	84,360	2.49%
Huron	Fresno	73	20.11%	256	70.52%	34	9.37%	-183	-50.41%	363	-14.68%
Kerman	Fresno	960	56.17%	680	39.79%	69	4.04%	280	16.38%	1,709	-9.97%
Kingsburg	Fresno	2,446	78.27%	586	18.75%	93	2.98%	1,860	59.52%	3,125	3.86%
Mendota	Fresno	223	32.04%	437	62.79%	36	5.17%	-214	-30.75%	696	-16.33%
Orange Cove	Fresno	292	28.08%	704	67.69%	44	4.23%	-412	-39.62%	1,040	-25.02%
Parlier	Fresno	269	25.47%	745	70.55%	42	3.98%	-476	-45.08%	1,056	-26.96%
Reedley	Fresno	2,751	66.03%	1,271	30.51%	144	3.46%	1,480	35.53%	4,166	3.25%
San Joaquin	Fresno	67	32.37%	130	62.80%	10	4.83%	-63	-30.43%	207	-9.86%
Sanger	Fresno	1,703	50.15%	1,578	46.47%	115	3.39%	125	3.68%	3,396	-2.36%
Selma	Fresno	2,016	57.52%	1,381	39.40%	108	3.08%	635	18.12%	3,505	-0.93%
Unincorporated Area	Fresno	32,886	73.31%	10,512	23.43%	1,458	3.25%	22,374	49.88%	44,856	5.38%
Orland	Glenn	1,134	71.59%	357	22.54%	93	5.87%	777	49.05%	1,584	0.42%
Willows	Glenn	1,207	76.06%	301	18.97%	79	4.98%	906	57.09%	1,587	12.14%
Unincorporated Area	Glenn	3,434	78.44%	763	17.43%	181	4.13%	2,671	61.01%	4,378	4.21%
Arcata	Humboldt	1,795	25.95%	3,874	56.00%	1,249	18.05%	-2,079	-30.05%	6,918	20.13%
Blue Lake	Humboldt	214	40.38%	239	45.09%	77	14.53%	-25	-4.72%	530	N/A (Note: City recorded no votes in the 2003 recall election.)
Eureka	Humboldt	4,409	49.44%	3,715	41.66%	793	8.89%	694	7.78%	8,917	5.37%
Ferndale	Humboldt	424	61.63%	237	34.45%	27	3.92%	187	27.18%	688	N/A
Fortuna	Humboldt	1,973	65.40%	888	29.43%	156	5.17%	1,085	35.96%	3,017	2.90%
Rio Dell	Humboldt	578	65.09%	251	28.27%	59	6.64%	327	36.82%	888	-1.43%
Trinidad	Humboldt	38	32.48%	65	55.56%	14	11.97%	-27	-23.08%	117	N/A
Unincorporated Area	Humboldt	13,851	50.90%	10,801	39.69%	2,559	9.40%	3,050	11.21%	27,211	13.40%
Brawley	Imperial	1,777	48.82%	1,630	44.78%	233	6.40%	147	4.04%	3,640	-19.95%
Calexico	Imperial	1,014	22.78%	2,894	65.00%	544	12.22%	-1,880	-42.23%	4,452	-34.36%
Calipatria	Imperial	183	41.59%	220	50.00%	37	8.41%	-37	-8.41%	440	-23.13%
El Centro	Imperial	2,843	48.43%	2,592	44.16%	435	7.41%	251	4.28%	5,870	-20.33%
Holtville	Imperial	500	53.71%	348	37.38%	83	8.92%	152	16.33%	931	-14.74%
Imperial	Imperial	1,012	54.32%	742	39.83%	109	5.85%	270	14.49%	1,863	-28.97%
Westmorland	Imperial	133	50.38%	102	38.64%	29	10.98%	31	11.74%	264	1.45%
Unincorporated Area	Imperial	2,901	61.54%	1,496	31.74%	317	6.72%	1,405	29.80%	4,714	-7.85%
Bishop	Inyo	604	58.70%	351	34.11%	74	7.19%	253	24.59%	1,029	-0.65%
Unincorporated Area	Inyo	3,576	65.46%	1,541	28.21%	346	6.33%	2,035	37.25%	5,463	1.77%
Arvin	Kern (Note: California's Supplement to Statement of Vote recorded 19,378 fewer Schwarzenegger votes & 6,219 fewer Angelides votes compared to the initial statement of vote, making the Kern County & statewide vote totals lower here than elsewhere in this article.)	493	40.78%	604	49.96%	112	9.26%	-111	-9.18%	1,209	-8.56%
Bakersfield	Kern	26,357	71.86%	9,024	24.60%	1,296	3.53%	17,333	47.26%	36,677	-3.57%
California City	Kern	1,869	73.50%	552	21.71%	122	4.80%	1,317	51.79%	2,543	-9.57%
Delano	Kern	1,839	43.86%	2,153	51.35%	201	4.79%	-314	-7.49%	4,193	-10.70%
Maricopa	Kern	225	81.23%	41	14.80%	11	3.97%	184	66.43%	277	-1.66%
McFarland	Kern	382	39.18%	535	54.87%	58	5.95%	-153	-15.69%	975	-20.89%
Ridgecrest	Kern	5,818	74.33%	1,548	19.78%	461	5.89%	4,270	54.55%	7,827	-2.19%
Shafter	Kern	1,149	63.98%	578	32.18%	69	3.84%	571	31.79%	1,796	-6.03%
Taft	Kern	1,509	83.55%	225	12.46%	72	3.99%	1,284	71.10%	1,806	-1.59%
Tehachapi	Kern	1,327	70.06%	461	24.34%	106	5.60%	866	45.72%	1,894	-0.15%
Wasco	Kern	1,157	57.88%	749	37.47%	93	4.65%	408	20.41%	1,999	-6.74%
Unincorporated Area	Kern	45,884	74.83%	12,556	20.48%	2,874	4.69%	33,328	54.36%	61,314	-2.16%
Avenal	Kings	273	44.83%	292	47.95%	44	7.22%	-19	-3.12%	609	-20.59%
Corcoran	Kings	774	47.60%	794	48.83%	58	3.57%	-20	-1.23%	1,626	-16.23%
Hanford	Kings	7,381	68.90%	2,923	27.28%	409	3.82%	4,458	41.61%	10,713	-1.01%
Lemoore	Kings	2,968	71.59%	1,022	24.65%	156	3.76%	1,946	46.94%	4,146	-2.67%
Unincorporated Area	Kings	4,287	73.79%	1,313	22.60%	210	3.61%	2,974	51.19%	5,810	2.44%
Clearlake	Lake	1,459	48.60%	1,301	43.34%	242	8.06%	158	5.26%	3,002	8.43%
Lakeport	Lake	947	57.81%	582	35.53%	109	6.65%	365	22.28%	1,638	9.84%
Unincorporated Area	Lake	8,524	57.64%	5,148	34.81%	1,117	7.55%	3,376	22.83%	14,789	11.52%
Susanville	Lassen	1,595	61.18%	832	31.91%	180	6.90%	763	29.27%	2,607	-16.25%
Unincorporated Area	Lassen	4,070	68.14%	1,521	25.46%	382	6.40%	2,549	42.68%	5,973	-10.42%
Agoura Hills	Los Angeles	3,266	62.01%	1,800	34.18%	201	3.82%	1,466	27.83%	5,267	3.51%
Alhambra	Los Angeles	6,888	43.94%	8,042	51.30%	746	4.76%	-1,154	-7.36%	15,676	-0.94%
Arcadia	Los Angeles	10,499	68.53%	4,240	27.68%	581	3.79%	6,259	40.86%	15,320	8.91%
Artesia	Los Angeles	4,333	57.47%	2,915	38.66%	292	3.87%	1,418	18.81%	7,540	0.44%
Avalon	Los Angeles	541	58.74%	335	36.37%	45	4.89%	206	22.37%	921	1.23%
Azusa	Los Angeles	3,495	47.67%	3,436	46.87%	400	5.46%	59	0.80%	7,331	-13.46%
Baldwin Park	Los Angeles	2,894	29.42%	6,508	66.15%	436	4.43%	-3,614	-36.74%	9,838	-20.30%
Bell	Los Angeles	916	22.19%	3,001	72.70%	211	5.11%	-2,085	-50.51%	4,128	-18.42%
Bell Gardens	Los Angeles	663	18.82%	2,685	76.24%	174	4.94%	-2,022	-57.41%	3,522	-18.21%
Bellflower	Los Angeles	6,105	49.09%	5,639	45.34%	692	5.56%	466	3.75%	12,436	-14.88%
Beverly Hills	Los Angeles	6,629	50.54%	6,068	46.26%	420	3.20%	561	4.28%	13,117	32.35%
Bradbury	Los Angeles	289	77.27%	76	20.32%	9	2.41%	213	56.95%	374	N/A
Burbank	Los Angeles	22,312	56.67%	15,185	38.57%	1,878	4.77%	7,127	18.10%	39,375	1.09%
Calabasas	Los Angeles	2,955	59.78%	1,818	36.78%	170	3.44%	1,137	23.00%	4,943	11.45%
Carson	Los Angeles	6,919	33.42%	12,944	62.52%	842	4.07%	-6,025	-29.10%	20,705	-9.87%
Cerritos	Los Angeles	5,556	57.44%	3,785	39.13%	331	3.42%	1,771	18.31%	9,672	-0.86%
Claremont	Los Angeles	6,639	51.71%	5,526	43.04%	674	5.25%	1,113	8.67%	12,839	0.24%
Commerce	Los Angeles	377	19.36%	1,495	76.78%	75	3.85%	-1,118	-57.42%	1,947	-25.46%
Compton	Los Angeles	1,511	12.44%	10,112	83.25%	524	4.31%	-8,601	-70.81%	12,147	-12.34%
Covina	Los Angeles	9,573	59.19%	5,872	36.31%	729	4.51%	3,701	22.88%	16,174	-3.79%
Cudahy	Los Angeles	309	18.67%	1,263	76.31%	83	5.02%	-954	-57.64%	1,655	-21.53%
Culver City	Los Angeles	5,371	39.19%	7,621	55.61%	712	5.20%	-2,250	-16.42%	13,704	23.71%
Diamond Bar	Los Angeles	8,452	61.74%	4,664	34.07%	573	4.19%	3,788	27.67%	13,689	-4.38%
Downey	Los Angeles	10,465	50.25%	9,420	45.23%	941	4.52%	1,045	5.02%	20,826	-15.04%
Duarte	Los Angeles	2,574	49.68%	2,341	45.18%	266	5.13%	233	4.50%	5,181	-9.01%
El Monte	Los Angeles	4,926	37.13%	7,726	58.23%	615	4.64%	-2,800	-21.10%	13,267	-9.35%
El Segundo	Los Angeles	4,008	66.60%	1,715	28.50%	295	4.90%	2,293	38.10%	6,018	17.73%
Gardena	Los Angeles	2,774	33.48%	5,103	61.59%	408	4.92%	-2,329	-28.11%	8,285	-12.55%
Glendale	Los Angeles	15,114	53.88%	11,464	40.87%	1,474	5.25%	3,650	13.01%	28,052	-4.15%
Glendora	Los Angeles	7,877	70.47%	2,850	25.50%	451	4.03%	5,027	44.97%	11,178	-5.35%
Hawaiian Gardens	Los Angeles	343	29.83%	736	64.00%	71	6.17%	-393	-34.17%	1,150	-17.43%
Hawthorne	Los Angeles	2,825	31.04%	5,807	63.81%	468	5.14%	-2,982	-32.77%	9,100	-14.31%
Hermosa Beach	Los Angeles	11,694	64.77%	5,627	31.16%	735	4.07%	6,067	33.60%	18,056	19.12%
Hidden Hills	Los Angeles	406	72.63%	139	24.87%	14	2.50%	267	47.76%	559	23.69%
Huntington Park	Los Angeles	1,112	19.43%	4,343	75.87%	269	4.70%	-3,231	-56.45%	5,724	-17.64%
Industry	Los Angeles	1	100.00%	0	0.00%	0	0.00%	1	100.00%	1	0.00%
Inglewood	Los Angeles	3,589	17.56%	15,854	77.58%	992	4.85%	-12,265	-60.02%	20,435	-3.96%
Irwindale	Los Angeles	78	32.37%	158	65.56%	5	2.07%	-80	-33.20%	241	N/A
La Canada Flintridge	Los Angeles	5,329	71.85%	1,793	24.17%	295	3.98%	3,536	47.67%	7,417	17.54%
La Habra Heights	Los Angeles	2,134	67.62%	814	25.79%	208	6.59%	1,320	41.83%	3,156	-13.15%
La Mirada	Los Angeles	8,146	63.35%	4,154	32.31%	558	4.34%	3,992	31.05%	12,858	-6.95%
La Puente	Los Angeles	1,280	27.98%	3,069	67.08%	226	4.94%	-1,789	-39.10%	4,575	-25.72%
La Verne	Los Angeles	4,995	66.23%	2,262	29.99%	285	3.78%	2,733	36.24%	7,542	-4.55%
Lakewood	Los Angeles	13,797	59.76%	8,153	35.31%	1,138	4.93%	5,644	24.45%	23,088	-6.65%
Lancaster	Los Angeles	10,711	62.50%	5,575	32.53%	852	4.97%	5,136	29.97%	17,138	-20.81%
Lawndale	Los Angeles	1,215	36.81%	1,905	57.71%	181	5.48%	-690	-20.90%	3,301	-19.86%
Lomita	Los Angeles	10,900	64.20%	5,379	31.68%	700	4.12%	5,521	32.52%	16,979	-0.37%
Long Beach	Los Angeles	41,421	48.33%	39,470	46.05%	4,820	5.62%	1,951	2.28%	85,711	-1.58%
Los Angeles	Los Angeles	277,285	38.96%	397,837	55.91%	36,506	5.13%	-120,552	-16.94%	711,628	2.41%
Lynwood	Los Angeles	1,205	16.82%	5,632	78.59%	329	4.59%	-4,427	-61.78%	7,166	-16.06%
Malibu	Los Angeles	3,178	56.55%	2,217	39.45%	225	4.00%	961	17.10%	5,620	13.46%
Manhattan Beach	Los Angeles	6,158	64.81%	2,974	31.30%	370	3.89%	3,184	33.51%	9,502	16.73%
Maywood	Los Angeles	380	16.32%	1,856	79.73%	92	3.95%	-1,476	-63.40%	2,328	-19.51%
Monrovia	Los Angeles	4,517	56.90%	3,001	37.80%	421	5.30%	1,516	19.10%	7,939	-5.08%
Montebello	Los Angeles	4,657	34.06%	8,354	61.10%	661	4.83%	-3,697	-27.04%	13,672	-8.80%
Monterey Park	Los Angeles	5,072	45.47%	5,615	50.34%	468	4.20%	-543	-4.87%	11,155	2.38%
Norwalk	Los Angeles	6,858	40.71%	9,200	54.61%	790	4.69%	-2,342	-13.90%	16,848	-20.14%
Palmdale	Los Angeles	8,750	54.42%	6,475	40.27%	854	5.31%	2,275	14.15%	16,079	-27.96%
Palos Verdes Estates	Los Angeles	2,889	76.13%	825	21.74%	81	2.13%	2,064	54.39%	3,795	19.94%
Paramount	Los Angeles	1,625	27.81%	3,929	67.23%	290	4.96%	-2,304	-39.43%	5,844	-20.60%
Pasadena	Los Angeles	17,936	47.52%	17,522	46.42%	2,285	6.05%	414	1.10%	37,743	13.11%
Pico Rivera	Los Angeles	2,603	26.42%	6,807	69.09%	443	4.50%	-4,204	-42.67%	9,853	-25.87%
Pomona	Los Angeles	7,938	39.62%	11,063	55.21%	1,036	5.17%	-3,125	-15.60%	20,037	-13.46%
Rancho Palos Verdes	Los Angeles	7,051	67.22%	3,049	29.07%	389	3.71%	4,002	38.15%	10,489	9.77%
Redondo Beach	Los Angeles	8,621	58.77%	5,282	36.01%	766	5.22%	3,339	22.76%	14,669	3.21%
Rolling Hills	Los Angeles	536	84.94%	84	13.31%	11	1.74%	452	71.63%	631	15.80%
Rolling Hills Estates	Los Angeles	1,712	75.72%	487	21.54%	62	2.74%	1,225	54.18%	2,261	10.39%
Rosemead	Los Angeles	1,880	37.76%	2,884	57.92%	215	4.32%	-1,004	-20.16%	4,979	-11.54%
San Dimas	Los Angeles	5,397	67.30%	2,327	29.02%	295	3.68%	3,070	38.28%	8,019	-5.13%
San Fernando	Los Angeles	854	26.32%	2,243	69.12%	148	4.56%	-1,389	-42.80%	3,245	-38.25%
San Gabriel	Los Angeles	2,403	47.53%	2,402	47.51%	251	4.96%	1	0.02%	5,056	-8.90%
San Marino	Los Angeles	3,611	76.80%	956	20.33%	135	2.87%	2,655	56.47%	4,702	18.02%
Santa Clarita	Los Angeles	31,208	70.55%	11,028	24.93%	1,997	4.51%	20,180	45.62%	44,233	-5.77%
Santa Fe Springs	Los Angeles	1,490	40.05%	2,057	55.30%	173	4.65%	-567	-15.24%	3,720	-17.11%
Santa Monica	Los Angeles	13,014	39.05%	18,514	55.56%	1,796	5.39%	-5,500	-16.50%	33,324	17.33%
Sierra Madre	Los Angeles	3,016	60.65%	1,663	33.44%	294	5.91%	1,353	27.21%	4,973	10.07%
Signal Hill	Los Angeles	878	48.24%	831	45.66%	111	6.10%	47	2.58%	1,820	-12.42%
South El Monte	Los Angeles	678	27.33%	1,695	68.32%	108	4.35%	-1,017	-40.99%	2,481	-19.88%
South Gate	Los Angeles	2,726	22.62%	8,809	73.10%	516	4.28%	-6,083	-50.48%	12,051	-21.79%
South Pasadena	Los Angeles	4,364	50.17%	3,791	43.58%	543	6.24%	573	6.59%	8,698	14.88%
Temple City	Los Angeles	3,404	58.87%	2,112	36.53%	266	4.60%	1,292	22.35%	5,782	-4.21%
Torrance	Los Angeles	18,310	63.08%	9,508	32.75%	1,210	4.17%	8,802	30.32%	29,028	-0.70%
Walnut	Los Angeles	4,212	60.32%	2,524	36.14%	247	3.54%	1,688	24.17%	6,983	-3.81%
West Covina	Los Angeles	7,541	48.36%	7,360	47.19%	694	4.45%	181	1.16%	15,595	-16.78%
West Hollywood	Los Angeles	2,750	30.47%	5,757	63.78%	519	5.75%	-3,007	-33.31%	9,026	13.39%
Westlake Village	Los Angeles	2,860	72.46%	976	24.73%	111	2.81%	1,884	47.73%	3,947	17.38%
Whittier	Los Angeles	10,140	56.36%	6,941	38.58%	909	5.05%	3,199	17.78%	17,990	-9.94%
Unincorporated Area	Los Angeles	134,006	50.38%	119,675	44.99%	12,296	4.62%	14,331	5.39%	265,977	1.90%
Chowchilla	Madera	1,363	73.92%	391	21.20%	90	4.88%	972	52.71%	1,844	7.23%
Madera	Madera	4,171	60.16%	2,513	36.25%	249	3.59%	1,658	23.91%	6,933	-3.00%
Unincorporated Area	Madera	15,882	74.47%	4,569	21.42%	876	4.11%	11,313	53.05%	21,327	2.48%
Belvedere	Marin	838	71.44%	308	26.26%	27	2.30%	530	45.18%	1,173	47.36%
Corte Madera	Marin	1,796	43.98%	2,019	49.44%	269	6.59%	-223	-5.46%	4,084	35.95%
Fairfax	Marin	993	26.21%	2,371	62.59%	424	11.19%	-1,378	-36.38%	3,788	29.12%
Larkspur	Marin	2,733	47.43%	2,708	47.00%	321	5.57%	25	0.43%	5,762	37.38%
Mill Valley	Marin	2,767	40.57%	3,633	53.26%	421	6.17%	-866	-12.70%	6,821	42.57%
Novato	Marin	10,289	52.67%	8,160	41.77%	1,086	5.56%	2,129	10.90%	19,535	26.20%
Ross	Marin	805	66.80%	364	30.21%	36	2.99%	441	36.60%	1,205	47.39%
San Anselmo	Marin	2,043	34.16%	3,413	57.07%	524	8.76%	-1,370	-22.91%	5,980	33.96%
San Rafael	Marin	8,915	44.84%	9,720	48.89%	1,248	6.28%	-805	-4.05%	19,883	28.78%
Sausalito	Marin	1,663	45.91%	1,707	47.13%	252	6.96%	-44	-1.21%	3,622	40.99%
Tiburon	Marin	2,503	59.30%	1,548	36.67%	170	4.03%	955	22.62%	4,221	41.55%
Unincorporated Area	Marin	13,094	44.14%	14,490	48.84%	2,084	7.02%	-1,396	-4.71%	29,668	36.67%
Unincorporated Area	Mariposa	5,074	66.82%	1,985	26.14%	534	7.03%	3,089	40.68%	7,593	5.80%
Fort Bragg	Mendocino	911	41.96%	1,080	49.75%	180	8.29%	-169	-7.78%	2,171	14.75%
Point Arena	Mendocino	50	34.97%	75	52.45%	18	12.59%	-25	-17.48%	143	21.78%
Ukiah	Mendocino	2,122	47.99%	1,935	43.76%	365	8.25%	187	4.23%	4,422	14.53%
Willits	Mendocino	603	44.83%	605	44.98%	137	10.19%	-2	-0.15%	1,345	12.23%
Unincorporated Area	Mendocino	10,316	45.34%	10,095	44.37%	2,342	10.29%	221	0.97%	22,753	16.90%
Atwater	Merced	3,136	64.69%	1,535	31.66%	177	3.65%	1,601	33.02%	4,848	2.23%
Dos Palos	Merced	674	64.31%	332	31.68%	42	4.01%	342	32.63%	1,048	-5.36%
Gustine	Merced	763	62.44%	412	33.72%	47	3.85%	351	28.72%	1,222	14.25%
Livingston	Merced	503	35.20%	856	59.90%	70	4.90%	-353	-24.70%	1,429	-9.48%
Los Banos	Merced	3,141	56.90%	2,155	39.04%	224	4.06%	986	17.86%	5,520	-2.59%
Merced	Merced	7,496	59.42%	4,560	36.15%	559	4.43%	2,936	23.27%	12,615	3.24%
Unincorporated Area	Merced	10,518	68.85%	4,177	27.34%	582	3.81%	6,341	41.51%	15,277	4.98%
Alturas	Modoc	717	70.16%	252	24.66%	53	5.19%	465	45.50%	1,022	9.47%
Unincorporated Area	Modoc	2,112	77.08%	471	17.19%	157	5.73%	1,641	59.89%	2,740	6.69%
Mammoth Lakes	Mono	948	57.91%	572	34.94%	117	7.15%	376	22.97%	1,637	3.60%
Unincorporated Area	Mono	1,367	64.88%	604	28.67%	136	6.45%	763	36.21%	2,107	-0.23%
Carmel-by-the-Sea	Monterey	1,332	63.67%	639	30.54%	121	5.78%	693	33.13%	2,092	38.68%
Del Rey Oaks	Monterey	384	56.55%	242	35.64%	53	7.81%	142	20.91%	679	35.13%
Gonzales	Monterey	379	36.51%	592	57.03%	67	6.45%	-213	-20.52%	1,038	0.51%
Greenfield	Monterey	356	27.24%	868	66.41%	83	6.35%	-512	-39.17%	1,307	-6.50%
King City	Monterey	616	48.62%	586	46.25%	65	5.13%	30	2.37%	1,267	3.45%
Marina	Monterey	2,330	53.44%	1,729	39.66%	301	6.90%	601	13.78%	4,360	19.17%
Monterey	Monterey	4,458	52.90%	3,409	40.45%	561	6.66%	1,049	12.45%	8,428	30.80%
Pacific Grove	Monterey	3,215	49.88%	2,762	42.85%	469	7.28%	453	7.03%	6,446	34.53%
Salinas	Monterey	10,491	46.82%	10,708	47.79%	1,209	5.40%	-217	-0.97%	22,408	6.32%
Sand City	Monterey	48	64.86%	22	29.73%	4	5.41%	26	35.14%	74	41.52%
Seaside	Monterey	2,504	46.08%	2,560	47.11%	370	6.81%	-56	-1.03%	5,434	19.73%
Soledad	Monterey	533	29.32%	1,157	63.64%	128	7.04%	-624	-34.32%	1,818	-7.40%
Unincorporated Area	Monterey	20,236	62.16%	10,495	32.24%	1,824	5.60%	9,741	29.92%	32,555	24.68%
American Canyon	Napa	1,775	45.57%	1,887	48.45%	233	5.98%	-112	-2.88%	3,895	10.82%
Calistoga	Napa	733	49.46%	652	43.99%	97	6.55%	81	5.47%	1,482	31.24%
Napa	Napa	12,055	52.38%	9,409	40.89%	1,549	6.73%	2,646	11.50%	23,013	23.71%
St. Helena	Napa	1,211	56.35%	805	37.46%	133	6.19%	406	18.89%	2,149	35.06%
Yountville	Napa	744	51.17%	622	42.78%	88	6.05%	122	8.39%	1,454	31.84%
Unincorporated Area	Napa	6,669	63.54%	3,129	29.81%	697	6.64%	3,540	33.73%	10,495	30.51%
Grass Valley	Nevada	2,541	60.17%	1,380	32.68%	302	7.15%	1,161	27.49%	4,223	9.28%
Nevada City	Nevada	716	48.61%	600	40.73%	157	10.66%	116	7.88%	1,473	16.21%
Truckee	Nevada	2,906	57.67%	1,682	33.38%	451	8.95%	1,224	24.29%	5,039	20.42%
Unincorporated Area	Nevada	22,407	68.88%	8,171	25.12%	1,952	6.00%	14,236	43.76%	32,530	12.35%
Aliso Viejo	Orange	7,584	70.42%	2,638	24.49%	548	5.09%	4,946	45.92%	10,770	-7.66%
Anaheim	Orange	36,596	64.53%	17,156	30.25%	2,957	5.21%	19,440	34.28%	56,709	-10.17%
Brea	Orange	8,859	74.05%	2,531	21.16%	573	4.79%	6,328	52.90%	11,963	-3.64%
Buena Park	Orange	9,015	61.65%	4,766	32.59%	842	5.76%	4,249	29.06%	14,623	-12.51%
Costa Mesa	Orange	16,022	66.66%	6,493	27.01%	1,520	6.32%	9,529	39.65%	24,035	-5.25%
Cypress	Orange	9,148	68.51%	3,591	26.89%	613	4.59%	5,557	41.62%	13,352	-5.06%
Dana Point	Orange	8,898	73.67%	2,594	21.48%	586	4.85%	6,304	52.19%	12,078	3.14%
Fountain Valley	Orange	12,928	73.50%	3,793	21.57%	867	4.93%	9,135	51.94%	17,588	0.04%
Fullerton	Orange	21,407	67.34%	8,737	27.48%	1,646	5.18%	12,670	39.86%	31,790	-2.99%
Garden Grove	Orange	22,755	67.39%	9,253	27.40%	1,756	5.20%	13,502	39.99%	33,764	0.09%
Huntington Beach	Orange	43,345	71.25%	14,470	23.78%	3,024	4.97%	28,875	47.46%	60,839	-2.86%
Irvine	Orange	31,140	66.61%	13,385	28.63%	2,224	4.76%	17,755	37.98%	46,749	2.55%
La Habra	Orange	7,615	64.82%	3,562	30.32%	571	4.86%	4,053	34.50%	11,748	-10.72%
La Palma	Orange	2,831	66.63%	1,266	29.80%	152	3.58%	1,565	36.83%	4,249	-5.96%
Laguna Beach	Orange	6,166	60.99%	3,428	33.91%	516	5.10%	2,738	27.08%	10,110	12.70%
Laguna Hills	Orange	6,780	74.34%	1,883	20.65%	457	5.01%	4,897	53.70%	9,120	-0.92%
Laguna Niguel	Orange	15,416	74.62%	4,449	21.53%	795	3.85%	10,967	53.08%	20,660	-0.65%
Laguna Woods	Orange	6,213	59.85%	3,837	36.96%	331	3.19%	2,376	22.89%	10,381	16.62%
Lake Forest	Orange	15,441	74.46%	4,228	20.39%	1,069	5.15%	11,213	54.07%	20,738	-5.08%
Los Alamitos	Orange	2,184	66.75%	928	28.36%	160	4.89%	1,256	38.39%	3,272	-4.39%
Mission Viejo	Orange	23,643	75.27%	6,506	20.71%	1,261	4.01%	17,137	54.56%	31,410	-0.76%
Newport Beach	Orange	25,705	80.28%	5,300	16.55%	1,013	3.16%	20,405	63.73%	32,018	9.23%
Orange	Orange	24,097	72.47%	7,480	22.49%	1,675	5.04%	16,617	49.97%	33,252	-3.23%
Placentia	Orange	9,718	72.32%	3,146	23.41%	574	4.27%	6,572	48.91%	13,438	-3.25%
Rancho Santa Margarita	Orange	9,428	77.01%	2,268	18.53%	546	4.46%	7,160	58.49%	12,242	-6.78%
San Clemente	Orange	15,466	76.25%	3,948	19.46%	869	4.28%	11,518	56.79%	20,283	1.11%
San Juan Capistrano	Orange	7,747	75.43%	2,032	19.79%	491	4.78%	5,715	55.65%	10,270	2.34%
Santa Ana	Orange	17,163	47.01%	16,965	46.46%	2,385	6.53%	198	0.54%	36,513	-14.41%
Seal Beach	Orange	7,603	66.72%	3,324	29.17%	469	4.12%	4,279	37.55%	11,396	7.35%
Stanton	Orange	3,537	61.42%	1,873	32.52%	349	6.06%	1,664	28.89%	5,759	-6.45%
Tustin	Orange	9,601	69.00%	3,548	25.50%	766	5.50%	6,053	43.50%	13,915	-4.96%
Villa Park	Orange	2,432	85.33%	323	11.33%	95	3.33%	2,109	74.00%	2,850	3.59%
Westminster	Orange	15,030	71.55%	4,985	23.73%	990	4.71%	10,045	47.82%	21,005	6.28%
Yorba Linda	Orange	17,993	79.77%	3,640	16.14%	923	4.09%	14,353	63.63%	22,556	-1.70%
Unincorporated Area	Orange	27,907	76.30%	7,062	19.31%	1,605	4.39%	20,845	56.99%	36,574	0.85%
Auburn	Placer	3,971	68.38%	1,514	26.07%	322	5.55%	2,457	42.31%	5,807	10.72%
Colfax	Placer	377	64.55%	157	26.88%	50	8.56%	220	37.67%	584	3.78%
Lincoln	Placer	10,679	76.07%	2,963	21.11%	397	2.83%	7,716	54.96%	14,039	13.19%
Loomis	Placer	2,121	78.29%	467	17.24%	121	4.47%	1,654	61.06%	2,709	9.44%
Rocklin	Placer	13,677	75.21%	3,873	21.30%	636	3.50%	9,804	53.91%	18,186	3.93%
Roseville	Placer	27,057	73.69%	8,358	22.76%	1,301	3.54%	18,699	50.93%	36,716	6.96%
Unincorporated Area	Placer	34,090	74.74%	9,391	20.59%	2,130	4.67%	24,699	54.15%	45,611	10.52%
Portola	Plumas	458	66.18%	192	27.75%	42	6.07%	266	38.44%	692	12.73%
Unincorporated Area	Plumas	5,702	69.81%	2,002	24.51%	464	5.68%	3,700	45.30%	8,168	7.32%
Banning	Riverside	5,381	67.17%	2,353	29.37%	277	3.46%	3,028	37.80%	8,011	7.19%
Beaumont	Riverside	3,317	67.71%	1,375	28.07%	207	4.23%	1,942	39.64%	4,899	-5.04%
Blythe	Riverside	1,123	48.78%	1,030	44.74%	149	6.47%	93	4.04%	2,302	-24.23%
Calimesa	Riverside	1,828	73.18%	575	23.02%	95	3.80%	1,253	50.16%	2,498	5.31%
Canyon Lake	Riverside	2,927	81.76%	550	15.36%	103	2.88%	2,377	66.40%	3,580	1.34%
Cathedral City	Riverside	5,030	56.60%	3,500	39.38%	357	4.02%	1,530	17.22%	8,887	-7.30%
Coachella	Riverside	573	23.19%	1,645	66.57%	253	10.24%	-1,072	-43.38%	2,471	-40.40%
Corona	Riverside	17,732	67.43%	7,411	28.18%	1,153	4.38%	10,321	39.25%	26,296	-10.75%
Desert Hot Springs	Riverside	1,789	61.14%	976	33.36%	161	5.50%	813	27.79%	2,926	-7.97%
Hemet	Riverside	12,020	68.27%	4,889	27.77%	698	3.96%	7,131	40.50%	17,607	3.53%
Indian Wells	Riverside	1,886	85.69%	293	13.31%	22	1.00%	1,593	72.38%	2,201	10.68%
Indio	Riverside	5,498	58.41%	3,541	37.62%	374	3.97%	1,957	20.79%	9,413	-2.16%
La Quinta	Riverside	7,060	76.56%	1,945	21.09%	216	2.34%	5,115	55.47%	9,221	3.14%
Lake Elsinore	Riverside	3,834	64.61%	1,775	29.91%	325	5.48%	2,059	34.70%	5,934	-16.98%
Moreno Valley	Riverside	12,790	51.07%	11,063	44.18%	1,190	4.75%	1,727	6.90%	25,043	-21.15%
Murrieta	Riverside	15,440	75.39%	4,244	20.72%	795	3.88%	11,196	54.67%	20,479	-5.62%
Norco	Riverside	4,401	76.30%	1,143	19.82%	224	3.88%	3,258	56.48%	5,768	-5.68%
Palm Desert	Riverside	11,092	74.49%	3,478	23.36%	321	2.16%	7,614	51.13%	14,891	8.69%
Palm Springs	Riverside	7,570	53.90%	6,009	42.79%	465	3.31%	1,561	11.12%	14,044	8.23%
Perris	Riverside	2,186	42.99%	2,582	50.78%	317	6.23%	-396	-7.79%	5,085	-24.90%
Rancho Mirage	Riverside	4,905	73.43%	1,680	25.15%	95	1.42%	3,225	48.28%	6,680	14.97%
Riverside	Riverside	31,322	59.39%	18,450	34.98%	2,968	5.63%	12,872	24.41%	52,740	-5.78%
San Jacinto	Riverside	3,631	63.21%	1,865	32.47%	248	4.32%	1,766	30.75%	5,744	-9.05%
Temecula	Riverside	14,693	75.83%	3,910	20.18%	774	3.99%	10,783	55.65%	19,377	-6.42%
Unincorporated Area	Riverside	73,934	68.08%	29,521	27.18%	5,148	4.74%	44,413	40.89%	108,603	-4.84%
Citrus Heights	Sacramento	16,530	69.85%	6,042	25.53%	1,093	4.62%	10,488	44.32%	23,665	5.22%
Elk Grove	Sacramento	22,678	62.50%	12,070	33.27%	1,534	4.23%	10,608	29.24%	36,282	0.67%
Folsom	Sacramento	15,430	75.11%	4,324	21.05%	790	3.85%	11,106	54.06%	20,544	9.11%
Galt	Sacramento	3,414	66.76%	1,481	28.96%	219	4.28%	1,933	37.80%	5,114	0.57%
Isleton	Sacramento	150	55.97%	105	39.18%	13	4.85%	45	16.79%	268	15.58%
Rancho Cordova	Sacramento	8,387	62.32%	4,269	31.72%	801	5.95%	4,118	30.60%	13,457	4.96%
Sacramento	Sacramento	51,170	47.21%	49,794	45.94%	7,430	6.85%	1,376	1.27%	108,394	8.82%
Unincorporated Area	Sacramento	101,130	65.52%	45,600	29.54%	7,622	4.94%	55,530	35.98%	154,352	8.18%
Hollister	San Benito	3,721	49.08%	3,398	44.82%	462	6.09%	323	4.26%	7,581	2.63%
San Juan Bautista	San Benito	252	47.10%	249	46.54%	34	6.36%	3	0.56%	535	20.71%
Unincorporated Area	San Benito	4,235	67.62%	1,753	27.99%	275	4.39%	2,482	39.63%	6,263	16.57%
Adelanto	San Bernardino	1,161	50.35%	1,002	43.45%	143	6.20%	159	6.90%	2,306	-40.35%
Apple Valley	San Bernardino	11,919	73.44%	3,653	22.51%	657	4.05%	8,266	50.93%	16,229	-11.15%
Barstow	San Bernardino	2,256	58.16%	1,401	36.12%	222	5.72%	855	22.04%	3,879	-19.50%
Big Bear Lake	San Bernardino	1,645	79.47%	359	17.34%	66	3.19%	1,286	62.13%	2,070	1.17%
Chino	San Bernardino	7,305	59.88%	4,256	34.89%	639	5.24%	3,049	24.99%	12,200	-15.35%
Chino Hills	San Bernardino	11,316	66.97%	4,898	28.99%	684	4.05%	6,418	37.98%	16,898	-9.58%
Colton	San Bernardino	2,849	41.93%	3,568	52.51%	378	5.56%	-719	-10.58%	6,795	-20.62%
Fontana	San Bernardino	9,403	47.38%	9,342	47.08%	1,099	5.54%	61	0.31%	19,844	-21.57%
Grand Terrace	San Bernardino	2,011	65.83%	898	29.39%	146	4.78%	1,113	36.43%	3,055	-1.12%
Hesperia	San Bernardino	9,612	68.63%	3,666	26.17%	728	5.20%	5,946	42.45%	14,006	-19.78%
Highland	San Bernardino	5,627	60.96%	3,177	34.42%	427	4.63%	2,450	26.54%	9,231	-10.12%
Loma Linda	San Bernardino	2,778	66.99%	1,152	27.78%	217	5.23%	1,626	39.21%	4,147	2.48%
Montclair	San Bernardino	2,275	48.42%	2,182	46.45%	241	5.13%	93	1.98%	4,698	-15.74%
Needles	San Bernardino	582	56.12%	401	38.67%	54	5.21%	181	17.45%	1,037	-7.05%
Ontario	San Bernardino	11,326	52.05%	9,264	42.58%	1,168	5.37%	2,062	9.48%	21,758	-18.19%
Rancho Cucamonga	San Bernardino	23,260	66.12%	10,335	29.38%	1,585	4.51%	12,925	36.74%	35,180	-12.32%
Redlands	San Bernardino	12,502	65.97%	5,500	29.02%	949	5.01%	7,002	36.95%	18,951	2.19%
Rialto	San Bernardino	5,157	41.23%	6,627	52.99%	723	5.78%	-1,470	-11.75%	12,507	-23.37%
San Bernardino	San Bernardino	13,173	49.53%	11,853	44.57%	1,569	5.90%	1,320	4.96%	26,595	-13.92%
Twentynine Palms	San Bernardino	1,928	72.98%	614	23.24%	100	3.79%	1,314	49.74%	2,642	-3.43%
Upland	San Bernardino	12,262	67.60%	5,030	27.73%	847	4.67%	7,232	39.87%	18,139	-5.13%
Victorville	San Bernardino	8,226	60.33%	4,743	34.79%	665	4.88%	3,483	25.55%	13,634	-23.82%
Yucaipa	San Bernardino	8,994	71.34%	3,008	23.86%	605	4.80%	5,986	47.48%	12,607	-4.81%
Yucca Valley	San Bernardino	3,760	73.38%	1,128	22.01%	236	4.61%	2,632	51.37%	5,124	2.24%
Unincorporated Area	San Bernardino	40,873	67.32%	16,331	26.90%	3,511	5.78%	24,542	40.42%	60,715	-7.76%
Carlsbad	San Diego	26,574	72.21%	8,980	24.40%	1,248	3.39%	17,594	47.81%	36,802	7.79%
Chula Vista	San Diego	25,808	57.99%	16,870	37.91%	1,828	4.11%	8,938	20.08%	44,506	-7.27%
Coronado	San Diego	5,358	77.24%	1,379	19.88%	200	2.88%	3,979	57.36%	6,937	18.30%
Del Mar	San Diego	1,393	64.25%	707	32.61%	68	3.14%	686	31.64%	2,168	24.88%
El Cajon	San Diego	13,525	70.67%	4,939	25.81%	673	3.52%	8,586	44.87%	19,137	-2.21%
Encinitas	San Diego	14,746	62.83%	7,509	32.00%	1,214	5.17%	7,237	30.84%	23,469	10.34%
Escondido	San Diego	20,955	72.66%	6,649	23.05%	1,236	4.29%	14,306	49.60%	28,840	-1.42%
Imperial Beach	San Diego	2,871	60.92%	1,562	33.14%	280	5.94%	1,309	27.77%	4,713	-6.62%
La Mesa	San Diego	10,867	62.82%	5,631	32.55%	800	4.62%	5,236	30.27%	17,298	2.88%
Lemon Grove	San Diego	3,440	59.13%	2,071	35.60%	307	5.28%	1,369	23.53%	5,818	-5.01%
National City	San Diego	3,202	43.97%	3,618	49.68%	463	6.36%	-416	-5.71%	7,283	-15.05%
Oceanside	San Diego	28,489	68.44%	11,266	27.06%	1,872	4.50%	17,223	41.37%	41,627	0.92%
Poway	San Diego	13,347	77.63%	3,293	19.15%	553	3.22%	10,054	58.48%	17,193	6.92%
San Diego	San Diego	194,638	59.26%	118,334	36.03%	15,462	4.71%	76,304	23.23%	328,434	7.14%
San Marcos	San Diego	12,536	71.41%	4,312	24.56%	708	4.03%	8,224	46.84%	17,556	-2.88%
Santee	San Diego	12,015	75.34%	3,453	21.65%	479	3.00%	8,562	53.69%	15,947	0.89%
Solana Beach	San Diego	3,646	67.23%	1,547	28.53%	230	4.24%	2,099	38.71%	5,423	16.77%
Vista	San Diego	12,510	69.72%	4,488	25.01%	944	5.26%	8,022	44.71%	17,942	-4.55%
Unincorporated Area	San Diego	103,139	75.75%	28,330	20.81%	4,689	3.44%	74,809	54.94%	136,158	2.33%
San Francisco	San Francisco	72,722	29.75%	153,335	62.72%	18,400	7.53%	-80,613	-32.98%	244,457	27.64%
Escalon	San Joaquin	1,460	73.07%	473	23.67%	65	3.25%	987	49.40%	1,998	13.66%
Lathrop	San Joaquin	1,043	48.53%	1,013	47.14%	93	4.33%	30	1.40%	2,149	-16.02%
Lodi	San Joaquin	12,053	71.76%	4,179	24.88%	565	3.36%	7,874	46.88%	16,797	3.58%
Manteca	San Joaquin	8,078	61.54%	4,521	34.44%	527	4.01%	3,557	27.10%	13,126	-1.59%
Ripon	San Joaquin	3,445	78.65%	814	18.58%	121	2.76%	2,631	60.07%	4,380	10.59%
Stockton	San Joaquin	25,790	50.61%	23,052	45.24%	2,118	4.16%	2,738	5.37%	50,960	0.44%
Tracy	San Joaquin	9,041	56.97%	6,286	39.61%	544	3.43%	2,755	17.36%	15,871	-4.21%
Unincorporated Area	San Joaquin	23,042	68.00%	9,530	28.13%	1,312	3.87%	13,512	39.88%	33,884	4.80%
Arroyo Grande	San Luis Obispo	4,877	65.73%	2,262	30.49%	281	3.79%	2,615	35.24%	7,420	6.31%
Atascadero	San Luis Obispo	6,719	66.35%	2,849	28.13%	559	5.52%	3,870	38.21%	10,127	1.15%
El Paso de Robles	San Luis Obispo	6,343	69.70%	2,403	26.40%	355	3.90%	3,940	43.29%	9,101	-0.34%
Grover Beach	San Luis Obispo	2,239	59.85%	1,290	34.48%	212	5.67%	949	25.37%	3,741	-2.83%
Morro Bay	San Luis Obispo	2,764	57.23%	1,803	37.33%	263	5.45%	961	19.90%	4,830	8.80%
Pismo Beach	San Luis Obispo	2,584	67.27%	1,134	29.52%	123	3.20%	1,450	37.75%	3,841	9.14%
San Luis Obispo	San Luis Obispo	8,136	51.92%	6,529	41.67%	1,005	6.41%	1,607	10.26%	15,670	10.43%
Unincorporated Area	San Luis Obispo	28,180	66.22%	12,298	28.90%	2,080	4.89%	15,882	37.32%	42,558	7.15%
Atherton	San Mateo	2,532	76.56%	685	20.71%	90	2.72%	1,847	55.85%	3,307	40.50%
Belmont	San Mateo	4,629	50.38%	4,022	43.77%	538	5.85%	607	6.61%	9,189	30.79%
Brisbane	San Mateo	516	34.91%	829	56.09%	133	9.00%	-313	-21.18%	1,478	20.39%
Burlingame	San Mateo	4,819	51.43%	4,064	43.37%	487	5.20%	755	8.06%	9,370	29.19%
Colma	San Mateo	112	29.40%	250	65.62%	19	4.99%	-138	-36.22%	381	7.05%
Daly City	San Mateo	6,614	35.74%	11,104	60.00%	789	4.26%	-4,490	-24.26%	18,507	13.87%
East Palo Alto	San Mateo	630	18.82%	2,441	72.93%	276	8.25%	-1,811	-54.11%	3,347	10.28%
Foster City	San Mateo	4,907	54.26%	3,770	41.69%	366	4.05%	1,137	12.57%	9,043	28.95%
Half Moon Bay	San Mateo	2,098	49.68%	1,846	43.71%	279	6.61%	252	5.97%	4,223	20.38%
Hillsborough	San Mateo	3,441	75.78%	1,006	22.15%	94	2.07%	2,435	53.62%	4,541	37.68%
Menlo Park	San Mateo	5,829	50.64%	4,975	43.22%	707	6.14%	854	7.42%	11,511	40.90%
Millbrae	San Mateo	3,229	51.16%	2,835	44.91%	248	3.93%	394	6.24%	6,312	25.14%
Pacifica	San Mateo	5,912	39.92%	7,912	53.43%	985	6.65%	-2,000	-13.51%	14,809	21.45%
Portola Valley	San Mateo	1,557	65.67%	694	29.27%	120	5.06%	863	36.40%	2,371	50.38%
Redwood City	San Mateo	9,459	47.55%	9,177	46.14%	1,255	6.31%	282	1.42%	19,891	23.46%
San Bruno	San Mateo	4,345	41.43%	5,586	53.27%	556	5.30%	-1,241	-11.83%	10,487	16.04%
San Carlos	San Mateo	6,305	53.72%	4,834	41.19%	597	5.09%	1,471	12.53%	11,736	34.58%
San Mateo	San Mateo	13,119	48.29%	12,691	46.71%	1,359	5.00%	428	1.58%	27,169	27.07%
South San Francisco	San Mateo	5,158	37.06%	8,086	58.10%	673	4.84%	-2,928	-21.04%	13,917	12.24%
Woodside	San Mateo	1,718	66.15%	754	29.03%	125	4.81%	964	37.12%	2,597	35.48%
Unincorporated Area	San Mateo	9,549	46.44%	9,531	46.35%	1,484	7.22%	18	0.09%	20,564	28.43%
Buellton	Santa Barbara	1,075	68.08%	424	26.85%	80	5.07%	651	41.23%	1,579	1.71%
Carpinteria	Santa Barbara	2,327	54.75%	1,727	40.64%	196	4.61%	600	14.12%	4,250	8.70%
Goleta	Santa Barbara	6,017	57.40%	3,914	37.34%	552	5.27%	2,103	20.06%	10,483	15.80%
Guadalupe	Santa Barbara	401	37.41%	566	52.80%	105	9.79%	-165	-15.39%	1,072	-26.97%
Lompoc	Santa Barbara	5,391	63.07%	2,671	31.25%	486	5.69%	2,720	31.82%	8,548	-1.40%
Santa Barbara	Santa Barbara	14,799	50.43%	12,808	43.64%	1,740	5.93%	1,991	6.78%	29,347	21.68%
Santa Maria	Santa Barbara	9,465	61.28%	5,216	33.77%	765	4.95%	4,249	27.51%	15,446	-9.90%
Solvang	Santa Barbara	1,570	73.47%	505	23.63%	62	2.90%	1,065	49.84%	2,137	11.81%
Unincorporated Area	Santa Barbara	32,632	65.37%	15,049	30.15%	2,236	4.48%	17,583	35.22%	49,917	12.10%
Campbell	Santa Clara	5,735	53.69%	4,330	40.54%	617	5.78%	1,405	13.15%	10,682	23.26%
Cupertino	Santa Clara	8,989	56.89%	6,072	38.43%	741	4.69%	2,917	18.46%	15,802	33.61%
Gilroy	Santa Clara	4,567	49.82%	4,125	45.00%	475	5.18%	442	4.82%	9,167	11.15%
Los Altos	Santa Clara	8,172	61.80%	4,476	33.85%	575	4.35%	3,696	27.95%	13,223	43.62%
Los Altos Hills	Santa Clara	2,752	71.31%	982	25.45%	125	3.24%	1,770	45.87%	3,859	44.26%
Los Gatos	Santa Clara	7,250	62.42%	3,816	32.85%	549	4.73%	3,434	29.57%	11,615	35.53%
Milpitas	Santa Clara	6,480	51.47%	5,496	43.66%	613	4.87%	984	7.82%	12,589	17.06%
Monte Sereno	Santa Clara	1,099	70.13%	426	27.19%	42	2.68%	673	42.95%	1,567	34.34%
Morgan Hill	Santa Clara	6,103	60.02%	3,605	35.45%	460	4.52%	2,498	24.57%	10,168	18.47%
Mountain View	Santa Clara	8,763	44.73%	9,417	48.07%	1,412	7.21%	-654	-3.34%	19,592	31.34%
Palo Alto	Santa Clara	10,265	42.39%	12,415	51.27%	1,534	6.34%	-2,150	-8.88%	24,214	40.21%
San Jose	Santa Clara	103,805	50.98%	90,750	44.57%	9,060	4.45%	13,055	6.41%	203,615	20.23%
Santa Clara	Santa Clara	11,805	48.27%	11,135	45.53%	1,518	6.21%	670	2.74%	24,458	22.38%
Saratoga	Santa Clara	8,451	67.76%	3,621	29.03%	400	3.21%	4,830	38.73%	12,472	33.68%
Sunnyvale	Santa Clara	16,205	51.26%	13,529	42.80%	1,878	5.94%	2,676	8.47%	31,612	28.93%
Unincorporated Area	Santa Clara	14,691	54.41%	10,842	40.15%	1,468	5.44%	3,849	14.26%	27,001	24.91%
Capitola	Santa Cruz	1,610	43.50%	1,767	47.74%	324	8.75%	-157	-4.24%	3,701	21.43%
Santa Cruz	Santa Cruz	6,692	29.40%	13,148	57.76%	2,922	12.84%	-6,456	-28.36%	22,762	24.62%
Scotts Valley	Santa Cruz	2,836	60.83%	1,566	33.59%	260	5.58%	1,270	27.24%	4,662	27.35%
Watsonville	Santa Cruz	2,771	37.45%	4,166	56.30%	462	6.24%	-1,395	-18.85%	7,399	3.99%
Unincorporated Area	Santa Cruz	23,957	46.38%	22,972	44.47%	4,730	9.16%	985	1.91%	51,659	23.56%
Anderson	Shasta	1,474	68.46%	553	25.69%	126	5.85%	921	42.78%	2,153	3.80%
Redding	Shasta	20,371	73.25%	6,136	22.06%	1,305	4.69%	14,235	51.18%	27,812	10.64%
Shasta Lake	Shasta	1,965	69.41%	715	25.26%	151	5.33%	1,250	44.15%	2,831	3.75%
Unincorporated Area	Shasta	19,626	75.58%	5,030	19.37%	1,310	5.05%	14,596	56.21%	25,966	7.27%
Loyalton	Sierra	205	65.50%	86	27.48%	22	7.03%	119	38.02%	313	-2.05%
Unincorporated Area	Sierra	926	71.84%	267	20.71%	96	7.45%	659	51.12%	1,289	14.17%
Dorris	Siskiyou	164	75.93%	43	19.91%	9	4.17%	121	56.02%	216	1.18%
Dunsmuir	Siskiyou	273	45.81%	257	43.12%	66	11.07%	16	2.68%	596	-6.03%
Etna	Siskiyou	214	70.16%	64	20.98%	27	8.85%	150	49.18%	305	-4.45%
Fort Jones	Siskiyou	192	74.13%	50	19.31%	17	6.56%	142	54.83%	259	-6.99%
Montague	Siskiyou	276	77.09%	66	18.44%	16	4.47%	210	58.66%	358	-14.12%
Mt. Shasta	Siskiyou	625	48.49%	544	42.20%	120	9.31%	81	6.28%	1,289	5.88%
Tulelake	Siskiyou	141	72.68%	44	22.68%	9	4.64%	97	50.00%	194	10.23%
Weed	Siskiyou	379	51.49%	315	42.80%	42	5.71%	64	8.70%	736	-2.00%
Yreka	Siskiyou	1,671	67.57%	654	26.45%	148	5.98%	1,017	41.12%	2,473	-13.20%
Unincorporated Area	Siskiyou	6,981	68.41%	2,578	25.26%	645	6.32%	4,403	43.15%	10,204	-3.42%
Benicia	Solano	5,609	52.87%	4,388	41.36%	612	5.77%	1,221	11.51%	10,609	24.19%
Dixon	Solano	3,082	64.29%	1,487	31.02%	225	4.69%	1,595	33.27%	4,794	6.17%
Fairfield	Solano	12,284	54.35%	9,292	41.11%	1,027	4.54%	2,992	13.24%	22,603	10.62%
Rio Vista	Solano	1,933	65.73%	895	30.43%	113	3.84%	1,038	35.29%	2,941	13.40%
Suisun City	Solano	2,735	47.47%	2,727	47.33%	300	5.21%	8	0.14%	5,762	5.62%
Vacaville	Solano	14,374	61.71%	7,869	33.78%	1,050	4.51%	6,505	27.93%	23,293	8.84%
Vallejo	Solano	10,590	38.90%	15,235	55.96%	1,399	5.14%	-4,645	-17.06%	27,224	15.00%
Unincorporated Area	Solano	4,523	69.60%	1,608	24.74%	368	5.66%	2,915	44.85%	6,499	14.63%
Cloverdale	Sonoma	1,526	51.75%	1,211	41.06%	212	7.19%	315	10.68%	2,949	20.08%
Cotati	Sonoma	1,083	40.55%	1,321	49.46%	267	10.00%	-238	-8.91%	2,671	17.13%
Healdsburg	Sonoma	2,096	47.45%	1,941	43.94%	380	8.60%	155	3.51%	4,417	24.64%
Petaluma	Sonoma	10,065	47.13%	9,707	45.45%	1,584	7.42%	358	1.68%	21,356	24.67%
Rohnert Park	Sonoma	5,889	47.04%	5,705	45.57%	926	7.40%	184	1.47%	12,520	14.10%
Santa Rosa	Sonoma	25,246	47.50%	23,871	44.91%	4,038	7.60%	1,375	2.59%	53,155	22.78%
Sebastopol	Sonoma	1,069	30.46%	1,937	55.20%	503	14.33%	-868	-24.74%	3,509	21.76%
Sonoma	Sonoma	2,400	50.08%	2,043	42.63%	349	7.28%	357	7.45%	4,792	36.55%
Windsor	Sonoma	4,866	54.82%	3,474	39.13%	537	6.05%	1,392	15.68%	8,877	18.01%
Unincorporated Area	Sonoma	27,368	46.18%	26,182	44.18%	5,714	9.64%	1,186	2.00%	59,264	25.39%
Ceres	Stanislaus	3,723	57.28%	2,463	37.89%	314	4.83%	1,260	19.38%	6,500	-5.23%
Hughson	Stanislaus	967	69.07%	377	26.93%	56	4.00%	590	42.14%	1,400	4.00%
Modesto	Stanislaus	24,382	62.51%	12,926	33.14%	1,696	4.35%	11,456	29.37%	39,004	4.50%
Newman	Stanislaus	879	57.79%	569	37.41%	73	4.80%	310	20.38%	1,521	-9.30%
Oakdale	Stanislaus	3,339	69.93%	1,226	25.68%	210	4.40%	2,113	44.25%	4,775	9.65%
Patterson	Stanislaus	1,287	51.52%	1,104	44.20%	107	4.28%	183	7.33%	2,498	-2.76%
Riverbank	Stanislaus	2,173	59.65%	1,292	35.47%	178	4.89%	881	24.18%	3,643	-1.96%
Turlock	Stanislaus	9,664	66.41%	4,254	29.23%	634	4.36%	5,410	37.18%	14,552	4.31%
Waterford	Stanislaus	1,034	65.53%	454	28.77%	90	5.70%	580	36.76%	1,578	-5.53%
Unincorporated Area	Stanislaus	19,979	70.37%	7,316	25.77%	1,096	3.86%	12,663	44.60%	28,391	7.23%
Live Oak	Sutter	786	55.00%	574	40.17%	69	4.83%	212	14.84%	1,429	-20.96%
Yuba City	Sutter	10,535	70.77%	3,685	24.75%	666	4.47%	6,850	46.02%	14,886	-4.83%
Unincorporated Area	Sutter	6,072	79.92%	1,228	16.16%	298	3.92%	4,844	63.75%	7,598	2.10%
Corning	Tehama	922	67.64%	350	25.68%	91	6.68%	572	41.97%	1,363	-0.26%
Red Bluff	Tehama	2,112	68.02%	817	26.31%	176	5.67%	1,295	41.71%	3,105	8.41%
Tehama	Tehama	113	77.40%	25	17.12%	8	5.48%	88	60.27%	146	14.49%
Unincorporated Area	Tehama	10,295	76.88%	2,474	18.48%	622	4.64%	7,821	58.40%	13,391	8.96%
Unincorporated Area	Trinity	3,819	64.61%	1,614	27.31%	478	8.09%	2,205	37.30%	5,911	9.49%
Dinuba	Tulare	1,417	58.99%	914	38.05%	71	2.96%	503	20.94%	2,402	0.79%
Exeter	Tulare	1,643	76.17%	425	19.70%	89	4.13%	1,218	56.47%	2,157	6.13%
Farmersville	Tulare	442	54.30%	331	40.66%	41	5.04%	111	13.64%	814	-5.38%
Lindsay	Tulare	458	51.93%	373	42.29%	51	5.78%	85	9.64%	882	-6.92%
Porterville	Tulare	4,538	63.74%	2,273	31.93%	308	4.33%	2,265	31.82%	7,119	-5.18%
Tulare	Tulare	5,685	69.46%	2,208	26.98%	291	3.56%	3,477	42.49%	8,184	1.65%
Visalia	Tulare	17,707	73.72%	5,521	22.99%	791	3.29%	12,186	50.73%	24,019	3.09%
Woodlake	Tulare	305	44.66%	339	49.63%	39	5.71%	-34	-4.98%	683	-11.99%
Unincorporated Area	Tulare	16,412	73.04%	5,187	23.09%	870	3.87%	11,225	49.96%	22,469	1.01%
Sonora	Tuolumne	969	62.40%	463	29.81%	121	7.79%	506	32.58%	1,553	17.47%
Unincorporated Area	Tuolumne	13,867	70.80%	4,642	23.70%	1,078	5.50%	9,225	47.10%	19,587	18.56%
Camarillo	Ventura	14,841	66.44%	6,588	29.49%	910	4.07%	8,253	36.94%	22,339	5.77%
Fillmore	Ventura	1,685	53.70%	1,306	41.62%	147	4.68%	379	12.08%	3,138	-6.85%
Moorpark	Ventura	6,504	66.55%	2,814	28.79%	455	4.66%	3,690	37.76%	9,773	-2.83%
Ojai	Ventura	1,537	50.16%	1,341	43.77%	186	6.07%	196	6.40%	3,064	6.13%
Oxnard	Ventura	12,374	42.81%	15,188	52.55%	1,340	4.64%	-2,814	-9.74%	28,902	-11.27%
Port Hueneme	Ventura	2,110	51.41%	1,774	43.23%	220	5.36%	336	8.19%	4,104	-4.56%
San Buenaventura	Ventura	19,418	55.83%	13,606	39.12%	1,759	5.06%	5,812	16.71%	34,783	1.45%
Santa Paula	Ventura	2,659	45.72%	2,821	48.50%	336	5.78%	-162	-2.79%	5,816	-7.66%
Simi Valley	Ventura	24,651	70.96%	8,485	24.43%	1,602	4.61%	16,166	46.54%	34,738	-4.23%
Thousand Oaks	Ventura	30,135	68.46%	12,041	27.36%	1,841	4.18%	18,094	41.11%	44,017	6.69%
Unincorporated Area	Ventura	18,948	62.57%	9,826	32.45%	1,511	4.99%	9,122	30.12%	30,285	3.29%
Davis	Yolo	9,722	42.66%	11,109	48.74%	1,961	8.60%	-1,387	-6.09%	22,792	26.40%
West Sacramento	Yolo	5,592	54.55%	4,043	39.44%	616	6.01%	1,549	15.11%	10,251	2.56%
Winters	Yolo	943	56.30%	647	38.63%	85	5.07%	296	17.67%	1,675	3.76%
Woodland	Yolo	8,525	63.58%	4,213	31.42%	670	5.00%	4,312	32.16%	13,408	4.66%
Unincorporated Area	Yolo	4,291	67.83%	1,721	27.21%	314	4.96%	2,570	40.63%	6,326	13.94%
Marysville	Yuba	1,786	68.48%	650	24.92%	172	6.60%	1,136	43.56%	2,608	0.60%
Wheatland	Yuba	701	78.41%	148	16.55%	45	5.03%	553	61.86%	894	6.27%
Unincorporated Area	Yuba	7,635	73.16%	2,175	20.84%	626	6.00%	5,460	52.32%	10,436	0.04%
Totals (Note: Statewide candidate vote percentages and the total vote number differ here because California's Supplement to Statement of Vote does not count write in votes as part of the city totals.)		4,829,913	55.83%	3,370,246	38.96%	451,186	5.22%	1,459,667	16.87%	8,651,345	6.09%

== Analysis ==
Results showed Schwarzenegger won 52 counties while Angelides won six; Schwarzenegger won an absolute majority in 48 counties and a plurality in four others, while Angelides won a majority in two counties and a plurality in four more. Schwarzenegger won large majorities in California's rural counties, the populous Southern California counties of San Diego, Orange, Riverside, San Bernardino, and Ventura, as well as populous Sacramento, Fresno, and Kern counties in the Central Valley. The results were closely contested in Los Angeles County and in Bay Area suburban counties. Angelides won substantially only in Alameda and San Francisco counties.

Contra Costa, Humboldt, Mendocino, Monterey, Napa, Santa Clara, Solano, Sonoma, and Yolo counties all voted for Schwarzenegger after voting No on the recall in 2003.

== See also ==
- 2006 United States gubernatorial elections
- List of governors of California
