= Statewide opinion polling for the June 2012 Republican Party presidential primaries =

Republican presidential primaries, 2012
← 2008	Early – Mid 2012	2016 →
- Leading Republican 2012 primary candidate by state (parentheses indicate a shared lead, italics indicates polling data, non-italics indicates a primary win). Stars indicate a completed primary. States in gray have no polling data or no relevant data due to a leading candidate having withdrawn or declined to enter the race. Mitt Romney 37+5 Rick Santorum 11 Newt Gingrich 2
Republican nominee before election
John McCain
Republican
Presumptive Republican nominee
Mitt Romney
Republican

This article contains opinion polling by U.S. state for the 2012 Republican Party presidential primaries.

As of May 2012, both Ron Paul and Mitt Romney have led polls in multiple states. They have both also reached at least 20 percent in polls in multiple states. Before announcing that they would not run, Mike Huckabee and Sarah Palin were also leading polls in multiple states with numbers above 20 percent. Michele Bachmann, Herman Cain, Rick Perry, and Rick Santorum were also able to lead polls in multiple states earlier in the race, but Cain suspended his campaign on December 3 after multiple allegations of sexual impropriety, Bachmann dropped out on January 4, one day after her poor showing in the Iowa caucuses, in which she came in sixth place and received just 5 percent of the vote, Perry dropped out on January 19 after finishing fifth in Iowa with just over 10 percent of the vote, finishing sixth in New Hampshire with less than 1 percent of the vote and with "lagging" poll numbers ahead of the South Carolina primary, and Santorum suspended his campaign on April 10. Newt Gingrich announced he would drop out of the race after a poor showing in the northeast on April 24.

Haley Barbour of Mississippi, Jeb Bush of Florida, Chris Christie of New Jersey, Jim DeMint of South Carolina, Bobby Jindal of Louisiana, Tim Pawlenty of Minnesota, Paul Ryan of Wisconsin and John Thune of South Dakota all succeeded in leading polls in their home states at some point in 2011, although only Pawlenty actually launched a campaign. Pawlenty exited the race on August 14, one day after finishing third in Iowa's Ames Straw Poll, citing a lack of campaign funds.

== Polling for completed primaries ==
=== California (June 5) ===
Winner: Mitt Romney
Primary date: June 5, 2012
Delegates: 172

Poll source	Date	1st	2nd	3rd	Other
SurveyUSA; Margin of error: ±4.8% Sample size: 439	Mar. 29 – Apr. 2, 2012	Mitt Romney; 44%	Rick Santorum; 23%	Newt Gingrich; 12%	Ron Paul 12%, Other 1%, Undecided 8%
USC Dornsife/Los Angeles Times; Margin of error: Sample size: 465	Mar. 14–19, 2012	Mitt Romney; 42%	Rick Santorum; 23%	Newt Gingrich; 12%	Ron Paul 10%, Other 2%, Undecided 9%, Will not vote 3%
Rasmussen Reports; Margin of error: ±4% Sample size: 750	Mar. 12, 2012	Mitt Romney; 43%	Rick Santorum; 23%	Newt Gingrich; 15%	Ron Paul 8%, Someone other candidate 3%, Undecided 8%
Rasmussen Reports; Margin of error: ±4% Sample size: 750	Mar. 12, 2012	Mitt Romney; 55%	Rick Santorum; 36%	–	–
Public Policy Institute; Margin of error: ±7.4% Sample size: 281	Feb. 21–28, 2012	Mitt Romney; 28%	Rick Santorum; 22%	Newt Gingrich; 17%	Ron Paul 8%, Someone else 2%, Don't know 22%
Field; Margin of error: ±7% Sample size: 220	Feb. 11–18, 2012	Mitt Romney; 31%	Rick Santorum; 25%	Ron Paul; 16%	Newt Gingrich 12%, Other 2%, Undecided 14%
Field; Margin of error: ±7% Sample size: 180	Feb. 2–10, 2012	Mitt Romney; 38%	Rick Santorum; 18%	Newt Gingrich; 13%	Ron Paul 9%, Other 4%, Undecided 18%
SurveyUSA; Margin of error: ±4.6% Sample size: 479	Feb. 8–9, 2012	Mitt Romney; 33%	Rick Santorum; 31%	Newt Gingrich; 17%	Ron Paul 9%, Other 3%, Undecided 7%
Public Policy Institute; Margin of error: ±8.1% Sample size: 286	Nov. 29 – Dec. 5, 2011	Newt Gingrich; 30%	Mitt Romney; 24%	Herman Cain; 8%	Ron Paul 8%, Rick Perry 4%, Rick Santorum 4%, Michele Bachmann 3%, Jon Huntsman 1%, Someone else 1%, Don't know 16%
Public Policy Institute; Margin of error: ±8.1% Sample size: 286	Nov. 29 – Dec. 5, 2011	Newt Gingrich; 33%	Mitt Romney; 25%	Ron Paul; 9%	Michele Bachmann 7%, Rick Perry 4%, Rick Santorum 4%, Jon Huntsman 2%, Someone else 1%, Don't know 16%
Field; Margin of error: ±5.7% Sample size: 330	Nov. 15–27, 2011	Mitt Romney; 26%	Newt Gingrich; 23%	Herman Cain; 9%	Ron Paul 5%, Michele Bachmann 3%, Rick Perry 3%, Rick Santorum 2%, Jon Huntsman 1%, Other 2%, Undecided 26%
Public Policy Polling; Margin of error: ±5.5% Sample size: 316	Nov. 10–13, 2011	Newt Gingrich; 33%	Mitt Romney; 23%	Herman Cain; 22%	Rick Perry 6%, Ron Paul 5%, Michele Bachmann 3%, Gary Johnson 2%, Jon Huntsman 1%, Rick Santorum 1%, someone else/not sure 5%
USC Dornsife/Los Angeles Times; Margin of error: ±4.5% Sample size: 434	Oct. 30 – Nov. 9, 2011	Mitt Romney; 27%	Herman Cain; 20%	Newt Gingrich; 14%	Ron Paul 6%, Rick Perry 3%, Michele Bachmann 2%, Jon Huntsman 1%, Rick Santorum 1%, Undecided 22%, Other/refused 3%
Field; Margin of error: ±5.6% Sample size: 333	Sep. 1–12, 2011	Mitt Romney; 28%	Rick Perry; 20%	Sarah Palin; 8%	Newt Gingrich 7%, Ron Paul 7%, Michele Bachmann 6%, Herman Cain 4%, Jon Huntsman 2%, Rick Santorum 1%, other/undecided 17%
Field; Margin of error: ±5.6% Sample size: 333	Sep. 1–12, 2011	Mitt Romney; 30%	Rick Perry; 22%	Michele Bachmann; 7%	Newt Gingrich 7%, Ron Paul 7%, Herman Cain 4%, Jon Huntsman 3%, Rick Santorum 1%, other/undecided 19%
USC Dornsife/Los Angeles Times; Margin of error: ±4.5% Sample size: 453	Aug. 17–28, 2011	Mitt Romney; 22%	Rick Perry; 22%	Ron Paul; 11%	Michele Bachmann 10%, Newt Gingrich 6%, Herman Cain 4%, Jon Huntsman 1%, Rick Santorum 1%, Fred Karger 0%, Thaddeus McCotter 0%, Buddy Roemer 0%, someone else/undecided 16%
Field; Margin of error: ±5.7% Sample size: 322	Jun. 3–13, 2011	Mitt Romney; 25%	Rudy Giuliani; 17%	Sarah Palin; 10%	Ron Paul 7%, Herman Cain 6%, Newt Gingrich 6%, Rick Perry 5%, Michele Bachmann 4%, Tim Pawlenty 3%, Rick Santorum 2%, Jon Huntsman 1%, Gary Johnson <0.5%, other/undecided 14%
Field; Margin of error: ±5.7% Sample size: 322	Jun. 3–13, 2011	Mitt Romney; 30%	Sarah Palin; 12%	Newt Gingrich; 8%	Ron Paul 8%, Herman Cain 7%, Rick Perry 6%, Michele Bachmann 5%, Tim Pawlenty 3%, Rick Santorum 2%, Jon Huntsman 1%, Gary Johnson <0.5%, other/undecided 18%
Public Policy Polling; Margin of error: ±4.9% Sample size: 403	Jan. 28–30, 2011	Mitt Romney; 22%	Newt Gingrich; 18%	Sarah Palin; 16%	Mike Huckabee 15%, Ron Paul 10%, Tim Pawlenty 3%, Mitch Daniels 2%, John Thune 1%, someone else/undecided 12%
Public Policy Polling; Margin of error: ±5.5% Sample size: 317	Oct. 29–31, 2010	Mitt Romney; 25%	Sarah Palin; 18%	Newt Gingrich; 15%	Mike Huckabee 15%, Mike Pence 3%, Tim Pawlenty 2%, Mitch Daniels 1%, John Thune 1%, someone else/undecided 19%
Public Policy Polling; Margin of error: ±4.9% Sample size: 400	Sep. 14–16, 2010	Mitt Romney; 24%	Newt Gingrich; 21%	Sarah Palin; 18%	Mike Huckabee 17%, Ron Paul 6%, someone else 5%, undecided 9%
Public Policy Polling; Margin of error: ±4.8% Sample size: 417	May 21–23, 2010	Newt Gingrich; 28%	Mitt Romney; 25%	Sarah Palin; 18%	Mike Huckabee 13%, Ron Paul 10%, undecided 6%
Magellan Strategies; Margin of error: ±3.97% Sample size: 612	Feb. 25, 2010	Mitt Romney; 31%	Sarah Palin; 18%	Mike Huckabee; 13%	Newt Gingrich 12%, Ron Paul 8%, Tim Pawlenty 3%, other candidate 3%, undecided 12%

=== Montana (June 5) ===
Winner: Mitt Romney
Primary date: June 5, 2012
Delegates: 26

Poll source	Date	1st	2nd	3rd	Other
Public Policy Polling Margin of error: ±4.9% Sample size: 403	Apr. 26–29, 2012	Mitt Romney; 66%	Ron Paul; 25%	–	Undecided 9%
Public Policy Polling Margin of error: ±4.5% Sample size: 470	Nov. 28–30, 2011	Newt Gingrich; 37%	Ron Paul; 12%	Mitt Romney; 11%	Michele Bachmann 10%, Herman Cain 10%, Rick Perry 5%, Jon Huntsman 3%, Rick Santorum 1%, Gary Johnson 1%, Someone Else 10%
Public Policy Polling Margin of error: ±5.0% Sample size: 382	Jun. 16–19, 2011	Sarah Palin; 20%	Michele Bachmann; 18%	Mitt Romney; 17%	Newt Gingrich 9%, Ron Paul 9%, Herman Cain 8%, Tim Pawlenty 7%, Jon Huntsman 4%, Someone else/Not sure 9%
Public Policy Polling Margin of error: ±5.0% Sample size: 382	Jun. 16–19, 2011	Michele Bachmann; 25%	Mitt Romney; 22%	Newt Gingrich; 11%	Ron Paul 10%, Tim Pawlenty 9%, Herman Cain 8%, Jon Huntsman 4%, Someone else/Not sure 10%
Public Policy Polling Margin of error: ±4.2% Sample size: 545	Nov. 10–13, 2010	Sarah Palin; 23%	Mike Huckabee; 22%	Newt Gingrich; 16%	Mitt Romney 12%, Ron Paul 9%, Tim Pawlenty 3%, John Thune 3%, Mitch Daniels 2%, undecided 10%

=== New Jersey (June 5) ===
Winner: Mitt Romney
Primary date: June 5, 2012
Delegates: 50

Poll source	Date	1st	2nd	3rd	Other
Quinnipiac University Margin of error: ±4.3% Sample size: 513	Apr. 3–9, 2012	Mitt Romney; 51%	Rick Santorum; 14%	Newt Gingrich; 9%	Ron Paul 7%, Someone else 1%, Wouldn't vote 4%, Don't know/No answer 14%
Rutgers-Eagleton Institute of Politics Margin of error: ±5.9% Sample size: 289	Feb. 9–11, 2012	Mitt Romney; 36%	Rick Santorum; 19%	Newt Gingrich; 11%	Ron Paul 11%, Someone else 11%, None of them 3%, Don't know 8%
Quinnipiac University Margin of error: ±4.6% Sample size: 464	Jan. 10–16, 2012	Mitt Romney; 40%	Newt Gingrich; 14%	Rick Santorum; 14%	Ron Paul 12%, Jon Huntsman 4%, Rick Perry 2%, Wouldn't vote 3%, DK/NA 13%
Quinnipiac University Margin of error: ±4.6% Sample size: 464	Jan. 10–16, 2012	Mitt Romney; 41%	Rick Santorum; 15%	Newt Gingrich; 14%	Ron Paul 12%, Rick Perry 2%, Wouldn't vote 3%, DK/NA 13%
Quinnipiac University Margin of error: ±4.2% Sample size: 548	Nov. 9–14, 2011	Mitt Romney; 29%	Newt Gingrich; 22%	Herman Cain; 12%	Ron Paul 6%, Jon Huntsman 4%, Michele Bachmann 3%, Rick Perry 3%, Rick Santorum 1%, someone else 2%, wouldn't vote 2%, DK/NA 16%
Quinnipiac University Margin of error: ±2.9% Sample size: 1,186	Oct. 5–10, 2011	Mitt Romney; 28%	Herman Cain; 17%	Ron Paul; 11%	Rick Perry 7%, Newt Gingrich 5%, Michele Bachmann 4%, Jon Huntsman 2%, Rick Santorum 1%, someone else/undecided 23%
Public Policy Polling Margin of error: ±5.7% Sample size: 300	Jul. 15–18, 2011	Chris Christie; 38%	Mitt Romney; 13%	Michele Bachmann; 12%	Ron Paul 9%, Rick Perry 8%, Herman Cain 5%, Newt Gingrich 4%, Tim Pawlenty 2%, Jon Huntsman 1%, someone else/not sure 8%
Public Policy Polling Margin of error: ±5.7% Sample size: 300	Jul. 15–18, 2011	Mitt Romney; 22%	Michele Bachmann; 21%	Ron Paul; 11%	Rick Perry 10%, Herman Cain 8%, Newt Gingrich 7%, Tim Pawlenty 5%, Jon Huntsman 3%, someone else/not sure 12%
Public Policy Polling Margin of error: ±5.7% Sample size: 300	Jul. 15–18, 2011	Mitt Romney; 21%	Michele Bachmann; 18%	Sarah Palin; 16%	Ron Paul 10%, Rick Perry 10%, Newt Gingrich 6%, Tim Pawlenty 6%, Herman Cain 5%, Jon Huntsman 2%, someone else/not sure 5%
Public Policy Polling Margin of error: ±4.9% Sample size: 400	Jan. 6–9, 2011	Mike Huckabee; 18%	Mitt Romney; 18%	Newt Gingrich; 15%	Sarah Palin 14%, Ron Paul 8%, Tim Pawlenty 4%, Mitch Daniels 3%, John Thune 2%, someone else/undecided 19%

=== New Mexico (June 5) ===
Winner: Mitt Romney
Primary date: June 5, 2012
Delegates: 23

Poll source	Date	1st	2nd	3rd	Other
Public Policy Polling Margin of error: ±5.7% Sample size: 300	Dec. 10–12, 2011	Newt Gingrich; 39%	Mitt Romney; 14%	Gary Johnson; 11%	Ron Paul 8%, Rick Perry 8%, Michele Bachmann 6%, Rick Santorum 3%, Jon Huntsman 2%, someone else/not sure 9%
Public Policy Polling Margin of error: ±4.9% Sample size: 400	Jun. 23–26, 2011	Michele Bachmann; 22%	Mitt Romney; 22%	Sarah Palin; 14%	Herman Cain 10%, Ron Paul 7%, Tim Pawlenty 7%, Newt Gingrich 4%, Jon Huntsman 3%, someone else/not sure 12%
Public Policy Polling Margin of error: ±4.9% Sample size: 400	Jun. 23–26, 2011	Michele Bachmann; 27%	Mitt Romney; 23%	Herman Cain; 12%	Ron Paul 8%, Tim Pawlenty 7%, Newt Gingrich 6%, Jon Huntsman 4%, someone else/not sure 13%
Public Policy Polling Margin of error: ±4.9% Sample size: 400	Jun. 23–26, 2011	Michele Bachmann; 21%	Mitt Romney; 18%	Gary Johnson; 13%	Sarah Palin 11%, Herman Cain 10%, Tim Pawlenty 7%, Newt Gingrich 6%, Ron Paul 5%, someone else/not sure 9%
Public Policy Polling Margin of error: ±5.2% Sample size: 357	Feb. 4–6, 2011	Sarah Palin; 20%	Mike Huckabee; 17%	Mitt Romney; 16%	Newt Gingrich 13%, Gary Johnson 13%, Tim Pawlenty 6%, Ron Paul 4%, Mitch Daniels 3%, someone else/undecided 8%
Public Policy Polling Margin of error: ±5.2% Sample size: 357	Feb. 4–6, 2011	Sarah Palin; 22%	Mike Huckabee; 18%	Mitt Romney; 16%	Newt Gingrich 15%, Tim Pawlenty 7%, Ron Paul 6%, Mitch Daniels 3%, someone else/undecided 12%
Public Policy Polling Margin of error: ±5.4% Sample size: 333	Feb. 18–20, 2010	Mitt Romney; 33%	Sarah Palin; 32%	Mike Huckabee; 18%	undecided 17%

=== South Dakota (June 5) ===
Winner: Mitt Romney
Primary date: June 5, 2012
Delegates: 28

Poll source	Date	1st	2nd	3rd	Other
Nielson Brothers Polling Margin of error: ±5.68% Sample size: 298	Dec. 6–9, 2011	Ron Paul; 22%	Newt Gingrich; 19%	Michele Bachmann; 18%	Rick Perry 15%, Mitt Romney 10%, undecided 16%
Public Policy Polling Margin of error: ±4.5% Sample size: 484	Jan. 28–30, 2011	Sarah Palin; 21%	Mike Huckabee; 19%	Mitt Romney; 17%	Newt Gingrich 12%, Ron Paul 7%, Tim Pawlenty 5%, Mitch Daniels 1%, undecided 19%
Public Policy Polling Margin of error: ±4.5% Sample size: 484	Jan. 28–30, 2011	John Thune; 37%	Sarah Palin; 12%	Mitt Romney; 12%	Mike Huckabee 11%, Newt Gingrich 10%, Ron Paul 5%, Tim Pawlenty 2%, Mitch Daniels 1%, undecided 10%

=== Utah (June 26) ===
Winner: Mitt Romney
Primary date: June 26, 2012
Delegates: 40

Poll source	Date	1st	2nd	3rd	Other
Public Policy Polling Margin of error: ±4.9% Sample size: 406	Jul. 8–10, 2011	Mitt Romney; 63%	Jon Huntsman; 10%	Michele Bachmann; 6%	Sarah Palin 5%, Herman Cain 4%, Ron Paul 4%, Rick Perry 4%, Newt Gingrich 3%, Tim Pawlenty 1%
Public Policy Polling Margin of error: ±4.9% Sample size: 406	Jul. 8–10, 2011	Mitt Romney; 60%	Jon Huntsman; 12%	Michele Bachmann; 8%	Ron Paul 5%, Herman Cain 4%, Rick Perry 4%, Newt Gingrich 2%, Tim Pawlenty 2%, Someone else/Undecided 4%
Public Policy Polling Margin of error: ±4.9% Sample size: 406	Jul. 8–10, 2011	Mitt Romney; 82%	Jon Huntsman; 14%	–	Someone else/Undecided 4%
Deseret News/KSL Margin of error: ±4.4% Sample size: 496	Feb. 8–10, 2011	Mitt Romney; 72%	Jon Huntsman; 15%	–	
Lake Tribune/Mason Dixon Margin of error: ±6.7% Sample size: 215	Apr. 26–28, 2010	Mitt Romney; 73%	Sarah Palin; 9%	Ron Paul; 5%	Newt Gingrich 4%, Mike Huckabee 1%, Tim Pawlenty 1%, other candidate 3%, undecided 4%
Dan Jones Poll Margin of error: ±6.2% Sample size: 254	Apr. 27, 2009	Mitt Romney; 55%	Jon Huntsman; 32%	–	other candidate/undecided 13%

== See also ==
- Results of the 2012 Republican Party presidential primaries
- Straw polls for the Republican Party presidential primaries, 2012
- Nationwide opinion polling for the Republican Party 2012 presidential primaries
