= Janice Jordan =

American politician

- Born: 1964 (age 61–62); Ojai, California, U.S.
- Occupations: Politician; activist
- Political party: Peace and Freedom

Janice Jordan (born 1964 in Ojai, California), is an American activist and health advocate who was a candidate for U.S. Vice President in the 2004 election as the candidate of the Peace and Freedom Party, as the running mate of Leonard Peltier. They received 27,607 votes. She was the party's candidate for Governor of California in 2006, receiving 69,934 votes, 0.8% of the total.

Jordan ran also for Congress in 1996 and 1998, for mayor of San Diego in 2000, and for San Diego City Council in 2001.

| Preceded by Kate McClatchy | Peace and Freedom nominee for Vice President of the United States; 2004 | Succeeded by Matt Gonzalez |
| Preceded by C.T. Weber | Peace and Freedom nominee for Governor of California; 2006 | Succeeded by Carlos Alvarez |
