= Elisha Shapiro =

American conceptual artist

Elisha Shapiro is an American nihilist and conceptual artist who creates public spectacles promoting a philosophical rejection of objective value and truth. In 2006, Shapiro ran as an independent candidate in the Governor of California election. His platform included free college education, secession from the United States, and marriage for gays only. He was defeated by Republican opponent Arnold Schwarzenegger.

Past work by Shapiro includes the 1984 Nihilist Olympics, a campaign for U.S. President in 1988, a campaign for Los Angeles County Sheriff in 1994, and the Nihilism Expo World's Fair in 1999. Shapiro is the founder of the International Nihilist Film Festival held annually in Los Angeles since 1999, and the publisher of the annual Nihilist Calendar. He also produced a public access TV show called "Nihilists' Corner" that ran from 1992 until 2006 in Los Angeles and New York.

Shapiro performs often at comedy and art venues. His one-man show, The Funniest Nihilist, was featured at the Hollywood Fringe Festival, and he was part of "the world's worst acrobatic team" in the stage show of comedy magician Larry Wilson.
