= Mervin Field =

American pollster

- Born: March 11, 1921; New Brunswick, New Jersey, U.S.
- Died: June 8, 2015 (aged 94); Mill Valley, California, U.S.
- Occupation: Pollster
- Known for: Founder, Field Research Corporation

Mervin Field (March 11, 1921 – June 8, 2015) was an American pollster of public opinion in the state of California.

== Biography ==
Field was born in 1921, the youngest of five children, in New Brunswick, New Jersey. He grew up in Princeton, New Jersey and graduated from Princeton High School in 1938. His parents were Jewish emigrants from Russia. His subsequent formal education was limited to a few months each at Rutgers University night school, the University of Missouri and the U.S. Merchant Marine Academy.

His first experience with survey research was in his high school junior year, when in a chance occurrence he was introduced to the polling pioneer, Dr. George Gallup. Field's first survey was in determining student preferences for his high school senior class president. Prior to World War II, Field worked for Opinion Research Corporation (ORC) and the Gallup Poll in Princeton, New Jersey.

He founded the Field Research Corporation (FRC), a commercial consumer and opinion research practice operating locally, regionally and nationally.

He married Virginia Fallon in 1949, and later divorced. Field was married to Marilyn Hammer from 1957 until her death in 2006.

Field died in 2015, of natural causes.

== Field Poll ==
The Field Poll was an independent, nonpartisan public opinion news service, with a focus on California. It shut down at the end of 2016. As of late 2009, it has published more than 2300 reports. It relied on financial support from newspapers and television stations, the University of California, the California State University system, and various non-profit foundations, not from political candidates or interests.

Since 1956, the Poll has deposited its survey data with the University of California and California State University campuses, to make them available for scholars, media, and public policy makers. It is a unique and rich archive that is used in political science, journalism. sociology, and survey research methodology courses.
