= 1990 California elections =

1990 California elections could refer to:

- 1990 California gubernatorial election
- 1990 California lieutenant gubernatorial election
- 1990 United States House of Representatives elections in California
- 1990 California State Senate election
- 1990 California State Assembly election
- 1990 California Attorney General election
- 1990 California Insurance Commissioner election
- 1990 California Secretary of State election
- 1990 California State Board of Equalization elections
- 1990 California State Controller election
- 1990 California State Treasurer election
- 1990 California Superintendent of Public Instruction election
