= Phil Angelides =

American politician (born 1953)

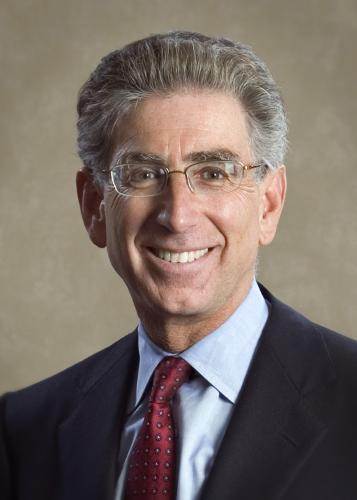
- Official portrait, 2009

31st Treasurer of California
- In office January 4, 1999 – January 8, 2007
- Governor: Gray Davis; Arnold Schwarzenegger
- Preceded by: Matt Fong
- Succeeded by: Bill Lockyer

Chair of the California Democratic Party
- In office March 3, 1991 – April 3, 1993
- Preceded by: Jerry Brown
- Succeeded by: Bill Press

Personal details
- Born: Phillip Nicholas Angelides; June 12, 1953 (age 73) Sacramento, California, U.S.
- Party: Democratic
- Spouse: Julie Angelides (m. 1983)
- Children: 3
- Education: Harvard University (BA)
- Profession: Businessman

Phillip Nicholas Angelides (/ˌændʒəˈliːdɪs/ AN-jə-LEE-dis; born June 12, 1953) is an American politician and real estate developer who served as the California state treasurer from 1999 to 2007. A member of the Democratic Party, Angelides was the party's nominee for governor of California in 2006. Angelides served as chair of the Financial Crisis Inquiry Commission, which was charged with investigating the causes of the 2008 financial crisis and presenting a report on its findings to the United States Congress.

== Early life and education ==
Phillip Nicholas Angelides was born in Sacramento, California, on June 12, 1953, to Helen (née Papadopoulos) and Jerry Angelides, who were Greek immigrants. Growing up, Phil and his brother Kimon were encouraged by their father to learn about geography and the United States government. Their father would quiz them weekly on these topics.

Angelides was educated at The Thacher School in Ojai, California and graduated from Harvard University in 1974, majoring in government as a Coro Foundation Fellow.

== Career ==
=== Early political career ===
Angelides' interest in politics was ignited in 1971, during his college freshman year, when he met anti-war activist Allard Lowenstein. In 1973, while in college, Angelides unsuccessfully ran for Sacramento City Council against a popular incumbent. From 1975 to 1983, Angelides worked for California's Housing and Community Development agency. During that time, he again ran unsuccessfully for city council in 1977.

Angelides was an early supporter and fundraiser of the eventual 1988 Democratic Presidential Nominee, Michael Dukakis, and maintains a strong friendship to the present. Dukakis has referred to Phil as "one of the five or 10 best people in American politics today." His work with Dukakis led him to serve as the chairman of the California Democratic Party from 1991 to 1993.

=== Real estate development ===
Angelides was appointed president of AKT Development Corp. (a company owned by one of his business mentors, Angelo Tsakopoulos) in 1984. In 1986, Angelides founded his own land development company, River West. Angelo Tsakopoulos, Angelides' former business partner, has been a major campaign donor to California office-holders, who, together with Angelides as chair of the California Democratic Party in the early 1990s, disbursed millions of dollars to Democratic candidates. Tsakopoulos has donated over $3,200,000 to Angelides' campaigns beginning in 1993 and for the 2006 gubernatorial race, Tsakopoulos has donated $3,750,000 to Mr. Angelides with his daughter, Eleni Tsakopoulous-Kounalakis donating $1,250,000.

Angelides' development firm, River West, is most known for development in a floodplain called Laguna West, which is located outside Sacramento in Elk Grove, California. Laguna West was one of the first developments designed along the principles of New Urbanism. For this project, as well as his history of promoting New Urbanism, Angelides was honored with a Lifetime Achievement Award from the Congress for the New Urbanism on June 11, 2005. However, since completion, the development at Laguna West has been described as a "catastrophic failure" that replicates many of the features of conventional suburban sprawl. The Sierra Club has described Laguna West as a "conventional suburb."

=== California State Treasurer ===
Angelides first ran for State Treasurer in 1994, losing in the general election to Matt Fong. He served as Co-Chair of the Sacramento Mayor's Commission on Education and the City's Future from 1995 to 1996. He then ran again for State Treasurer in 1998 as a Democrat and won, and was re-elected in 2002.

From 1999 to 2007, Angelides served as California State Treasurer. As Treasurer, he was an ex-officio member of the boards of the California Public Employees' Retirement System (CalPERS) and the California State Teachers' Retirement System (CalSTRS), which are the nation's first and third largest public pension funds.

In 1999 Angelides launched the ScholarShare college savings trust, described by the Los Angeles Times as one of "the nation's best," (a subsection of the scholarship portion of the ScholarShare program was discontinued due to lack of funds after only a year) and sponsored a $25 billion bond to relieve overcrowding and repair damaged schools.

He was considered a leader in the corporate reform movement and advocated for investment in socially and environmentally conscious businesses and for businesses with increased standards of financial disclosure. For example, in April 2006 CalSTRS board members unanimously supported Angelides' motion to divest from Sudan to pressure an end to the government-backed genocide in Sudan. His Green Wave Initiative invested $950,000,000 into environmental businesses and technologies and his Double Bottom Line Initiative invested 14 billion dollars into inner-city and underserved communities. In 2003, the CalPERS investment committee approved of Angelides' Investment Protection Standards, which require that investment banking firms who do business with CalPERS separate their research and investment banking practices. New York State Attorney General Eliot Spitzer complimented Angelides' plan saying, "I applaud Treasurer Angelides for his actions. Today's announcement is an important first step in ensuring that these reforms become the new market standard." Angelides, along with 10 other state treasurers and controllers, called on the SEC to approve a rule giving shareholders the right to nominate candidates for corporate boards of directors.

A 2008 CalSTRS report stated that the two funds had collectively missed an estimated $1 billion in profits due to their decision, advocated by Angelides early during his tenure, to divest from tobacco companies. A 2007 CalPERS report estimated that the funds lost an estimated $400 million due to a decision, again advocated by Angelides, to divest from companies located in India, Thailand, and China due to their labor practices.

=== 2006 gubernatorial campaign ===
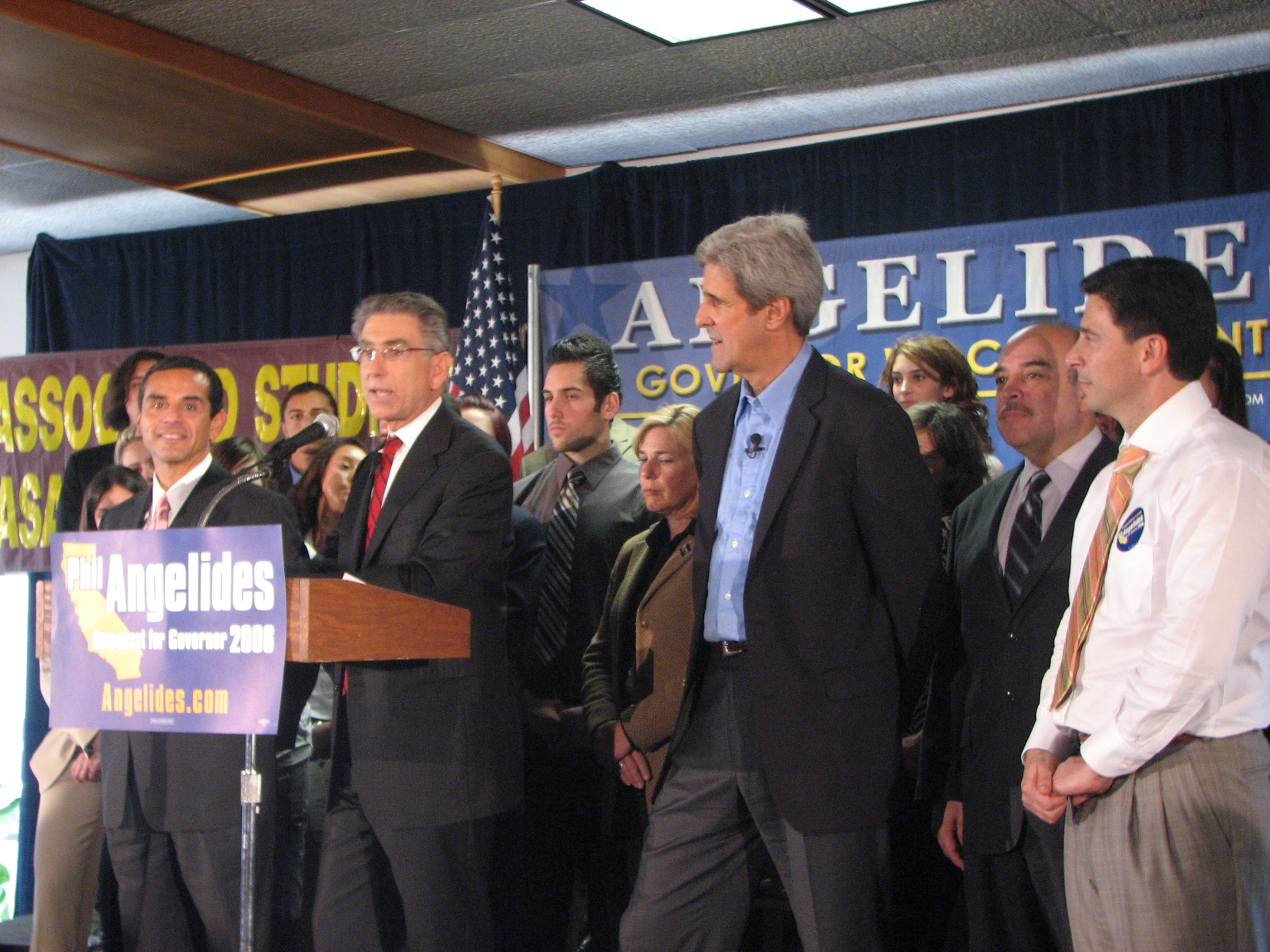
From left: Antonio Villaraigosa, Angelides, John Kerry, Cruz Bustamante and Fabian Núñez at a rally for Angelides' gubernatorial campaign

In early 2005, Angelides announced his intention to run against the current Governor Arnold Schwarzenegger in 2006, having made little secret of his ambition for the Governor's Office from the time that Schwarzenegger was elected in 2003. On April 29, 2006, Angelides was endorsed by the California Democratic Party at the California State Democratic Convention in Sacramento. Despite this, polls from around that time showed that his opponent in the race, California State Controller Steve Westly, had an advantage in the primary. Angelides then won the endorsements of the Sacramento Bee and the Los Angeles Times, two of California's largest newspapers, and the California League of Conservation Voters, after a head-to-head debate with Westly. He also received the endorsement of the liberal San Francisco Bay Guardian. A Field Poll held on June 2, 2006, had Westly leading Angelides by one percentage point, 35% to 34% with 26% undecided.

Angelides was also endorsed by former vice president Al Gore, New York Attorney General Eliot Spitzer, Senators Barbara Boxer and Dianne Feinstein, Former Massachusetts Governor and 1988 Democratic Presidential nominee Michael Dukakis, United States Senator from Massachusetts and 2004 Democratic Presidential nominee John Kerry, Assembly Speaker Fabian Núñez, California Lieutenant Governor Cruz Bustamante, Mayor of Los Angeles Antonio Villaraigosa, Minority Leader Nancy Pelosi, the California Labor Federation, the California Teachers' Association, the California Professional Firefighters, the California Sierra Club, California League of Conservation Voters, California NOW, Vote the Coast and Clean Water Action. Following his primary defeat on June 6, California State Controller Steve Westly endorsed the victorious Angelides as did Assemblyman Mark Leno and San Francisco Supervisor Fiona Ma.

For a time, Angelides used California Democratic Party political operative Bob Mulholland., and Political media consultants Sidney Galanty and Mark Galanty.

On July 7, 2006, Angelides expressed his support for gay rights, and pledged to legalize same-sex marriage if elected governor, stating "I would sign the marriage equality bill because I believe if we can get behind people to build a lasting relationship, that is a good thing."

Angelides also called for reducing tax breaks for corporations and individuals earning $500,000 or more per year, in a plan to earn revenue to increase funding for public K-12 education and higher education. The plan would halt and repeal increases made in the tuition fees of the University of California system, and the California Community College system. He stated his opposition to sending National Guard troops to the California-Mexico border and wanted to seek closer ties with the then-President of Mexico, Vicente Fox. This plan was criticized by his opponents as a tax hike.

On May 22, 2006, Angelides announced his support for Vinod Khosla's Clean Alternative Energy Initiative (prop. 87), which would assess oil company profits by $4 billion over the next ten years and use the proceeds to invest into research for alternative energy such as ethanol.

On May 23, 2006, Angelides wrote Barbara Boxer, a member of the Senate Committee on Commerce, Science and Transportation, urging her to support net neutrality.

Angelides also endorsed the Clean Money Initiative (Prop. 89), which would provide public financing to candidates who can obtain at least 750 $5 contributions from voters and who have participated in at least one primary and two general election debates. It would also place new restrictions on contributions and expenditures by lobbyists and corporations.

Angelides presented himself as a more progressive and liberal candidate, and accused Westly of working too closely with Governor Arnold Schwarzenegger. Westly accused Angelides of being an anti-environment real estate developer. Westly's ads in that matter were later criticized by the executive directors of Vote the Coast, Sierra Club, California League of Conservation Voters, and California Coastal Protection Network in a letter saying "All of the environmental organizations who do endorsements believe Phil has the vision to be the greenest governor California has ever had."

On June 6, 2006, Angelides won the Democratic primary over Westly with 48 percent of the vote over his opponent's 43 percent.

On August 16, Angelides announced his plans to cut taxes by $1.4 billion for California's middle class and small businesses.

An unauthorized MySpace web page for Angelides was embraced by his campaign. During the Democratic primary, both Angelides and Westly used MySpace to rally supporters and spread their messages to potential voters.

He stated his intent to increase high school funding by $200,000,000 to hire more counselors in high schools and middle schools as well as increasing admission quotas for the UC and CSU systems by 20,000 students. He has stated that he would "seriously consider" lowering the minimal voting age from 18 to 16 if elected governor.

==== Alleged campaign involvement in Schwarzenegger remark controversy ====
On September 7, 2006, it was revealed that Governor Arnold Schwarzenegger referred to Latino Republican Assemblymember Bonnie Garcia as being fiery and hot-tempered because "black blood" mixed with "Latino blood" equals "hot". He further stated "I mean, they [Cubans and Puerto Ricans] are all very hot...they have the, you know, part of the black blood in them and part of the Latino blood in them and together that makes it."

It was a front-page story on the Los Angeles Times and was revealed by reporter Robert Salladay. Schwarzenegger then apologized for the remarks the next day, in a joint press conference with Garcia in Santa Monica.

A few days later, the Schwarzenegger campaign claimed that it was the victim of a breach of security protocols, and Andrea Lynn Hoch, Schwarzenegger's legal affairs secretary stated that the file was stored "in a password-protected area of the governor's office network computer system." The California Highway Patrol was asked to investigate.

On September 13, it was discovered that the recording was obtained by members of the Angelides campaign on August 29 and 30 stored in an MP3 file and that campaign researcher Sean Sullivan and press spokesman Dan Newman submitted it to the Los Angeles Times. Katie Levinson, a spokeswoman for the Schwarzenegger campaign wanted Angelides to "denounce the unethical actions taken on his behalf", stating that he was trying to personally smear Schwarzenegger.

In response to the claims from Schwarzenegger's camp, Angelides campaign manager Cathy Calfo dismissed the claims as being politically motivated and "completely false." In regards to the recording she stated: "What I have been told is, there was information accessed by one of our computers off of a taxpayer-funded, publicly available Web site that any member of the public would have access to..." She also expressed regret that Sullivan and Newman submitted the tape without consulting with other members of the campaign.

According to The Inquirer, the supposed URL where the recording was taken from is http://speeches.gov.ca.gov/dir/06-21.htm (now offline)

Roger Salazar, a California Democratic Party spokesman also was quoted as saying - "They want to put it off onto some massive conspiracy theory... The governor's office is trying to play up the nefarious angle to deflect attention from their own incompetence — accidentally posting the recording on its own Web site. And from the recordings themselves."

In early 2007, the CHP issued a report clearing the Angelides campaign and Sullivan and Newman of any wrongdoing. The CHP concluded in its 38-page report that the digital audio files were placed on a website that was "accessed by backwards browsing ... which does not constitute a crime." The CHP recommended that no criminal charges be filed against anyone involved in "Tapegate".

==== Outcome ====
In the 2006 California gubernatorial election, incumbent governor Schwarzenegger defeated Angelides in a landslide. Due to lack of name recognition, Angelides was considered an unknown by comparison. His campaign did not air a single biographical ad until very late into the campaign.

In the Democratic primary, Steve Westly spent $43 million ($35 million was of Westly's own fortune), compared to Angelides' $28.1 million (though an additional $10.4 million though independent campaigns on Angelides' behalf helped narrow the gap with Westly). Schwarzenegger spent around $42 million during the whole of 2006, likely most of it in the general election as he did not face a serious primary challenge, while Angelides was estimated to only spend around $10 million after winning the nomination.

Garry South, Steve Westly's campaign manager, stated Angelides' attacks on Schwarzenegger came across as boastful and partisan to the electorate. The attacks failed to register and perhaps backfired, because Angelides' failed to take into account Schwarzenegger shift back to the political center, moderating his policies and returning to close co-operation with the Democratic-dominated assembly since his widely unsuccessful 2005 special election.

According to campaign aides, Angelides was said to have micromanaged his campaign, down to minute and esoteric details such as paper shredders and the color of briefing papers.

After his defeat, Angelides stated that he would stay involved in California politics, not ruling out another run for governor or other statewide office.

=== Later career ===
Angelides was interviewed in the documentary Meltdown on the 2008 financial crisis, where he blamed the crisis on banks lending out loans to people who clearly couldn't afford to pay them back.

On July 15, 2009, Angelides was named Chairman of the bi-partisan 10-member Financial Crisis Inquiry Commission. The Commission was created by a law passed by Congress and signed by President Obama in May 2009 and was charged with investigating the events that led to the monumental 2008 collapse of the financial markets. The Commission was mandated with reporting back to Congress by the end of 2010, "with a series of conclusions about what occurred, and recommendations as to how to avoid future market breakdowns." It presented its report to the president and Congress in January 2011, concluding that the crisis was avoidable and was caused by widespread failures of regulation, excessive risk taking by Wall Street, government leaders ill-prepared for crisis, and systemic breaches in accountability and ethics. The report made the New York Times and Washington Post best sellers lists and The New York Review of Books hailed it as "the most comprehensive indictment of the American financial failure that has yet been made" and "the definitive history of this period."

On October 27, 2023, Angelides was named to the Climate United Board of Directors (see wayback machine

== Personal life ==
In 1983, Angelides married his wife, Julie. They have three daughters, Megan, Christina, and Arianna. His eldest daughter, Megan Garcia-Angelides, was the campus coordinator for his 2006 campaign.

== Reputation ==
According to seized Enron emails, during the California energy crisis, Jeff Dasovich, Enron's Director for State Government Affairs, called Angelides a "chowder head" and said that he was throwing a "tantrum" after Angelides wrote a letter to the president of the CPUC, urging the commission to end direct access for large business energy consumers.

Party political offices
Preceded by Jerry Brown	Chair of the California Democratic Party; 1991–1993	Succeeded by Bill Press
Preceded by Kathleen Brown	Democratic nominee for Treasurer of California; 1994, 1998, 2002	Succeeded by Bill Lockyer
Preceded by Cruz Bustamante	Democratic nominee for Governor of California; 2006	Succeeded by Jerry Brown
Political offices
Preceded by Matt Fong	Treasurer of California; 1999–2007	Succeeded by Bill Lockyer
