= 1994 California State Treasurer election =

- November 8, 1994
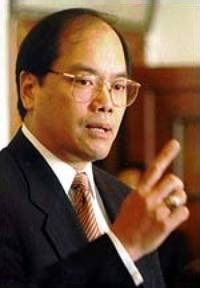

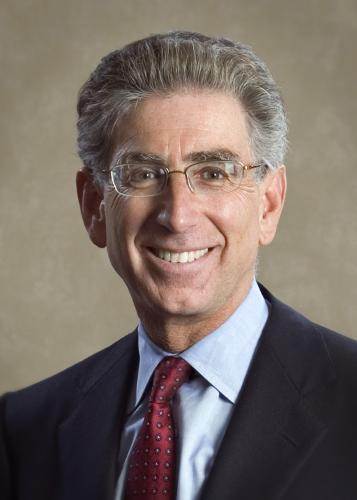
Nominee	Matt Fong	Phil Angelides
Party	Republican	Democratic
Popular vote	3,970,308	3,488,891
Percentage	48.46%	42.58%
- County results Fong: 40–50% 50–60% 60–70% Angelides: 40–50% 50–60% 60–70%
Treasurer before election
Kathleen Brown
Democratic
Elected Treasurer
Matt Fong
Republican

The 1994 California State Treasurer election occurred on November 8, 1994. The primary elections took place on March 8, 1994. The Republican nominee, Board of Equalization Chairman Matt Fong, narrowly defeated the Democratic nominee, Phil Angelides, for the office previously held by incumbent Kathleen Brown, who chose not to seek re-election in favor of running for governor. As of 2026, this was the last time a Republican was elected California state treasurer.

== Primary results ==
Final results from California Secretary of State.

=== Democratic ===
California State Treasurer Democratic primary, 1994
Candidate	Votes	%
Phil Angelides	1,153,145	55.44
David Roberti	926,902	44.56
Total votes	2,080,047	100.00

=== Others ===
California State Treasurer primary, 1994 (Others)
Party	Candidate	Votes	%
Republican	Matt Fong	1,679,510	100.00
American Independent	George M. McCoy	17,880	100.00
Libertarian	Jon Petersen	13,710	100.00
Peace and Freedom	Jan B. Tucker	4,143	100.00

== General election results ==
Final results from the Secretary of State of California.

1994 Secretary of State election, California
Party	Candidate	Votes	%
Republican	Matt Fong	3,970,308	48.46
Democratic	Phil Angelides	3,488,891	42.58
Libertarian	John Petersen	335,452	4.09
American Independent	George M. McCoy	203,419	2.48
Peace and Freedom	Jan B. Tucker	195,667	2.39
No party	Write-ins	47	0.00
Invalid or blank votes		706,852	7.94
Total votes		8,193,784	100.00
Turnout			46.98
Republican gain from Democratic			

=== Results by county ===
Final results from the Secretary of State of California.

County	Fong	Votes	Angelides	Votes	Petersen	Votes	McCoy	Votes	Tucker	Votes	Write-ins	Votes
Madera	63.30%	16,376	28.95%	7,490	3.25%	841	2.48%	641	2.01%	521	0.00%	0
Sutter	62.69%	13,408	30.53%	6,530	2.73%	583	2.39%	511	1.66%	355	0.00%	0
Tulare	61.64%	46,170	30.16%	22,590	3.07%	2,296	2.90%	2,174	2.24%	1,675	0.00%	0
Mono	61.11%	2,007	30.12%	989	4.48%	147	2.34%	77	1.95%	64	0.00%	0
Inyo	60.75%	4,201	29.49%	2,039	3.79%	262	3.85%	266	2.13%	147	0.00%	0
Kern	60.71%	88,200	29.00%	42,132	4.35%	6,317	3.53%	5,134	2.41%	3,505	0.00%	0
Placer	59.72%	43,581	32.55%	23,755	3.64%	2,659	2.19%	1,596	1.90%	1,383	0.00%	0
El Dorado	59.64%	31,552	31.95%	16,902	3.96%	2,093	2.45%	1,296	2.01%	1,064	0.00%	0
Colusa	59.40%	2,855	33.06%	1,589	2.98%	143	2.66%	128	1.89%	91	0.00%	0
Fresno	59.31%	102,059	33.50%	57,640	2.84%	4,895	2.17%	3,727	2.19%	3,761	0.00%	1
Orange	59.23%	422,288	29.89%	213,142	5.42%	38,650	3.13%	22,301	2.33%	16,596	0.00%	0
Kings	58.75%	12,803	33.49%	7,299	2.72%	592	2.73%	595	2.32%	505	0.00%	0
Nevada	58.29%	21,452	32.33%	11,897	4.76%	1,751	2.62%	965	2.00%	736	0.00%	0
San Diego	57.62%	411,189	34.07%	243,118	4.30%	30,706	2.06%	14,687	1.94%	13,869	0.00%	3
Mariposa	56.85%	3,931	33.78%	2,336	3.73%	258	3.22%	223	2.42%	167	0.00%	0
Modoc	56.72%	2,105	29.75%	1,104	4.82%	179	6.20%	230	2.51%	93	0.00%	0
Calaveras	55.71%	8,540	34.93%	5,354	4.51%	691	2.50%	383	2.36%	361	0.00%	0
Alpine	55.33%	348	31.32%	197	6.52%	41	3.50%	22	3.34%	21	0.00%	0
Amador	55.20%	7,113	37.23%	4,797	3.44%	443	2.28%	294	1.85%	238	0.00%	0
Riverside	55.05%	179,852	34.55%	112,888	4.42%	14,443	3.34%	10,928	2.64%	8,622	0.00%	0
Ventura	54.90%	112,521	34.96%	71,657	4.82%	9,878	2.91%	5,965	2.40%	4,922	0.00%	0
Glenn	54.89%	4,213	37.15%	2,852	2.92%	224	3.35%	257	1.69%	130	0.00%	0
Yuba	54.48%	7,455	34.30%	4,693	4.08%	558	4.31%	590	2.83%	387	0.00%	0
Sierra	54.20%	839	34.43%	533	5.17%	80	3.81%	59	2.39%	37	0.00%	0
Merced	53.69%	20,444	38.68%	14,729	3.13%	1,192	2.52%	960	1.98%	754	0.00%	0
Tuolumne	53.61%	10,326	38.64%	7,443	3.98%	767	1.92%	370	1.85%	356	0.00%	0
Plumas	53.41%	4,349	37.20%	3,029	4.37%	356	2.80%	228	2.21%	180	0.00%	0
Butte	52.69%	34,751	38.24%	25,222	4.02%	2,651	3.07%	2,027	1.98%	1,306	0.00%	0
San Joaquin	52.68%	64,613	40.57%	49,756	2.67%	3,278	2.37%	2,908	1.70%	2,087	0.00%	0
Shasta	52.68%	27,833	36.23%	19,146	4.39%	2,319	4.62%	2,439	2.09%	1,102	0.00%	0
Siskiyou	52.57%	9,148	37.11%	6,459	4.28%	745	3.38%	588	2.66%	463	0.00%	0
San Luis Obispo	52.11%	42,876	38.77%	31,900	4.30%	3,541	2.80%	2,301	2.03%	1,669	0.00%	0
Lassen	52.01%	4,100	35.25%	2,779	4.85%	382	5.04%	397	2.85%	225	0.00%	0
San Bernardino	51.69%	171,754	37.22%	123,673	4.89%	16,241	3.53%	11,714	2.67%	8,884	0.00%	0
Santa Barbara	51.55%	64,178	39.77%	49,503	3.76%	4,676	2.47%	3,076	2.45%	3,053	0.00%	0
Stanislaus	51.16%	49,335	41.43%	39,955	2.77%	2,674	2.37%	2,282	2.27%	2,192	0.00%	0
Trinity	49.57%	2,597	35.88%	1,880	6.03%	316	5.08%	266	3.44%	180	0.00%	0
Sacramento	49.38%	171,447	43.40%	150,687	3.36%	11,661	1.81%	6,278	2.06%	7,155	0.00%	1
Imperial	47.41%	10,799	41.24%	9,393	3.29%	750	3.94%	897	4.13%	940	0.00%	0
Del Norte	47.15%	3,397	43.10%	3,105	3.60%	259	3.93%	283	2.22%	160	0.00%	0
Tehama	46.11%	8,258	42.43%	7,598	4.85%	868	4.35%	779	2.27%	406	0.00%	0
Contra Costa	45.13%	125,363	47.53%	132,011	3.37%	9,359	1.97%	5,463	2.01%	5,574	0.00%	0
Monterey	45.12%	39,747	46.45%	40,916	3.69%	3,249	2.53%	2,227	2.21%	1,947	0.00%	0
Napa	44.87%	18,325	46.70%	19,073	3.50%	1,428	2.78%	1,134	2.16%	881	0.00%	0
Yolo	44.07%	20,724	47.94%	22,546	3.59%	1,687	2.01%	947	2.39%	1,124	0.00%	0
Los Angeles	44.00%	862,477	46.94%	919,940	4.06%	79,564	2.46%	48,208	2.54%	49,805	0.00%	12
Lake	43.81%	8,324	47.14%	8,957	4.00%	760	2.74%	520	2.32%	440	0.00%	0
San Benito	43.74%	4,899	46.54%	5,213	4.49%	503	3.00%	336	2.22%	249	0.00%	0
Santa Clara	42.59%	179,252	48.45%	203,900	4.73%	19,890	2.21%	9,291	2.03%	8,523	0.00%	7
Solano	42.30%	40,290	49.12%	46,786	3.79%	3,605	2.63%	2,502	2.16%	2,060	0.00%	0
Humboldt	40.43%	18,502	48.59%	22,236	4.02%	1,838	2.51%	1,147	4.45%	2,037	0.00%	0
Sonoma	40.26%	60,517	50.37%	75,711	4.05%	6,093	2.08%	3,133	3.24%	4,863	0.00%	0
San Mateo	39.27%	79,825	53.78%	109,332	3.27%	6,653	1.76%	3,581	1.91%	3,891	0.00%	0
Mendocino	38.15%	10,982	49.33%	14,202	5.01%	1,441	2.37%	683	5.14%	1,479	0.00%	0
Marin	37.60%	37,292	55.66%	55,200	3.24%	3,213	1.20%	1,186	2.30%	2,279	0.00%	1
Santa Cruz	36.76%	31,569	51.65%	44,366	5.40%	4,637	2.03%	1,746	4.16%	3,572	0.00%	0
Alameda	32.88%	124,496	59.85%	226,574	3.13%	11,860	1.63%	6,154	2.51%	9,497	0.00%	13
San Francisco	29.15%	62,461	61.67%	132,148	3.86%	8,266	2.02%	4,319	3.31%	7,084	0.00%	9

== See also ==
- California state elections, 1994
- State of California
- California State Treasurer
