= Van Gordon Sauter =

American businessman

- Born: September 14, 1935 (age 90); Middletown, Ohio, US
- Education: Ohio University; University of Missouri
- Occupations: President of CBS News; President of Fox News; President of CBS Sports
- Organization: CBS News

Van Gordon Sauter (born September 14, 1935) is a television executive who was the president of CBS News and the president of Fox News. He is a member of the Brown political family of California.

== Education ==
Sauter graduated with a bachelor's degree in English from Ohio University in 1957 and a master's degree in journalism from the University of Missouri in 1959. After leaving college, he worked as a reporter and staff writer for newspapers in Massachusetts, Detroit, and Chicago.

== Career ==
Sauter was a two-time president of CBS News, from 1982 to 1983 and again in 1986. He held many other positions at CBS including being an executive producer for CBS News radio from 1970 until 1972, Paris bureau chief of CBS News from 1975 until 1976, and president of CBS Sports from 1980 until 1982. Before then, he served a long stint as news director at CBS owned and operated station WBBM-TV in Chicago, helming it to first place in the local ratings.

Sauter resigned from CBS News in 1986 after fallout from his decision to hand the early-morning time slot to a new unit in the CBS Broadcast Group. CBS had struggled in that slot for the better part of 32 years, and affiliates were calling for a pivot away from the hard-news formats it had offered for most of the previous two decades. However, that slot had been CBS News' biggest block of air time for most of that period, and the rash of layoffs made Sauter's position untenable. After leaving CBS News, he helped develop a talk show for Jesse Jackson.

In 1992, he was hired to be the president of the new Fox News division. He left Fox News when he became heavily involved in his wife's 1994 campaign for California governor.

== Personal life ==
He has been married to former California Treasurer Kathleen Brown, the sister and daughter of former California governors Jerry Brown and Pat Brown.
