= 2002 California State Treasurer election =

- November 5, 2002
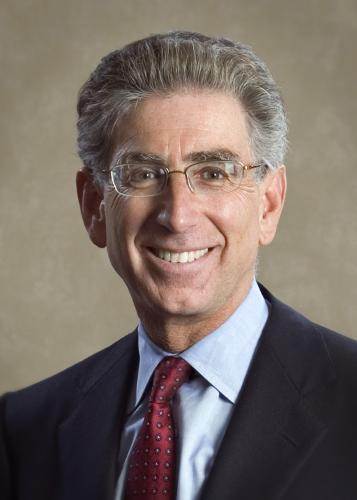

Nominee	Phil Angelides	Greg Conlon
Party	Democratic	Republican
Popular vote	3,546,583	2,914,138
Percentage	49.30%	40.51%
- County results Angelides: 40–50% 50–60% 60–70% 70–80% Conlon: 40–50% 50–60% 60–70%
Treasurer before election
Phil Angelides
Democratic
Elected Treasurer
Phil Angelides
Democratic

The 2002 California State Treasurer election occurred on November 5, 2002. The primary elections took place on March 5, 2002. The Democratic incumbent, Phil Angelides, defeated the Republican nominee, Greg Conlon.

== Primary results ==
A bar graph of statewide results in this contest are available at https://web.archive.org/web/20080905210540/http://primary2002.ss.ca.gov/Returns/trs/00.htm.

Results by county are available here and here.

=== Republican ===
==== Candidates ====
Greg Conlon, Businessman

Mary A. Toman

California State Treasurer Republican primary, 2002
Candidate	Votes	%
Greg Conlon	1,008,247	51.17
Mary A. Toman	962,123	48.83
Total votes	1,970,370	100.00

=== Others ===
California State Treasurer primary, 2002 (Others)
Party	Candidate	Votes	%
Democratic	Phil Angelides	1,884,632	100.00
Green	Jeanne-Marie Rosenmeier	35,280	100.00
American Independent	Nathan E. Johnson	26,743	100.00
Libertarian	Marian Smithson	19,208	100.00
Natural Law	Sylvia Valentine	4,312	100.00

== Results ==
California State Treasurer election, 2002
Party	Candidate	Votes	%
Democratic	Phil Angelides (incumbent)	3,546,583	49.30
Republican	Greg Conlon	2,914,138	40.51
Green	Jeanne-Marie Rosenmeier	356,077	4.95
Libertarian	Marian Smithson	168,401	2.34
Natural Law	Sylvia Valentine	111,453	1.55
American Independent	Nathan E. Johnson	96,817	1.35
Invalid or blank votes		545,352	7.05
Total votes		7,193,469	100.00
Turnout			36.05
Democratic hold			

=== Results by county ===
Results from the Secretary of State of California:

County	Angelides	Votes	Conlon	Votes	Rosen.	Votes	Smith.	Votes	Others	Votes
San Francisco	70.31%	141,131	15.78%	31,671	9.38%	18,831	2.00%	4,005	2.53%	5,081
Alameda	65.16%	216,101	22.50%	74,619	8.40%	27,877	1.82%	6,051	2.12%	7,024
Marin	59.67%	51,390	28.31%	24,381	8.99%	7,740	1.81%	1,559	1.23%	1,058
Los Angeles	58.15%	956,205	31.94%	525,312	4.15%	68,174	2.55%	41,967	3.21%	52,774
San Mateo	57.29%	94,313	31.09%	51,176	6.16%	10,144	2.30%	3,788	3.15%	5,191
Santa Cruz	55.95%	42,042	26.68%	20,049	11.83%	8,889	2.83%	2,130	2.71%	2,034
Santa Clara	55.55%	190,569	33.88%	116,203	5.37%	18,437	2.56%	8,770	2.64%	9,051
Monterey	53.95%	45,186	36.44%	30,521	4.53%	3,791	2.13%	1,785	2.95%	2,471
Solano	53.90%	46,274	36.91%	31,685	4.29%	3,685	1.96%	1,685	2.94%	2,521
Contra Costa	53.82%	133,825	36.37%	90,422	5.31%	13,212	2.22%	5,531	2.28%	5,658
Sonoma	53.58%	75,534	30.65%	43,206	10.72%	15,113	2.49%	3,509	2.56%	3,606
Yolo	53.45%	24,093	35.04%	15,793	7.53%	3,393	1.62%	730	2.36%	1,064
Imperial	51.22%	10,647	37.88%	7,875	2.47%	513	1.81%	377	6.61%	1,375
Napa	51.17%	18,114	37.40%	13,238	6.37%	2,255	2.30%	815	2.75%	975
Lake	49.37%	7,716	39.34%	6,149	6.10%	953	2.14%	334	3.05%	477
Sacramento	49.23%	152,599	42.00%	130,211	4.72%	14,622	1.75%	5,438	2.30%	7,125
San Benito	48.57%	5,766	41.56%	4,934	4.19%	498	2.24%	266	3.44%	408
Mendocino	47.19%	11,413	31.43%	7,602	15.13%	3,659	2.92%	706	3.33%	805
Merced	46.28%	18,336	45.00%	17,827	3.27%	1,294	1.74%	690	3.72%	1,472
San Joaquin	45.91%	54,821	45.33%	54,120	3.64%	4,350	1.70%	2,031	3.41%	4,077
Humboldt	45.22%	18,777	35.70%	14,823	14.16%	5,878	2.77%	1,150	2.16%	897
Stanislaus	44.90%	41,970	46.64%	43,594	3.26%	3,043	1.54%	1,436	3.66%	3,425
Santa Barbara	44.14%	48,376	44.87%	49,176	6.29%	6,891	2.34%	2,560	2.37%	2,603
Alpine	43.77%	232	38.87%	206	9.43%	50	3.96%	21	3.96%	21
Del Norte	43.27%	2,831	45.13%	2,953	4.77%	312	2.86%	187	3.97%	260
Ventura	42.87%	79,571	46.96%	87,169	4.39%	8,153	2.56%	4,743	3.22%	5,976
San Diego	42.68%	267,005	48.20%	301,503	3.91%	24,477	2.44%	15,244	2.77%	17,357
San Bernardino	42.37%	115,468	47.74%	130,088	3.31%	9,019	2.88%	7,835	3.71%	10,105
Riverside	41.32%	122,630	50.59%	150,157	3.04%	9,025	2.34%	6,934	2.71%	8,038
Fresno	41.12%	62,135	50.43%	76,200	3.37%	5,086	1.83%	2,767	3.25%	4,905
Amador	40.43%	5,176	50.57%	6,475	4.44%	568	1.93%	247	2.63%	337
Kings	39.98%	8,315	52.03%	10,821	3.19%	664	1.52%	317	3.28%	682
Tuolumne	39.53%	7,008	50.57%	8,965	4.82%	854	2.10%	372	2.98%	529
Trinity	39.31%	1,878	45.24%	2,161	7.49%	358	4.23%	202	3.73%	178
San Luis Obispo	38.88%	30,862	50.07%	39,743	6.19%	4,911	2.51%	1,996	2.34%	1,857
Plumas	38.88%	3,022	50.48%	3,923	4.79%	372	2.50%	194	3.36%	261
Calaveras	37.00%	5,483	50.86%	7,538	5.63%	835	2.85%	423	3.65%	541
Butte	36.86%	22,011	50.49%	30,147	7.58%	4,528	2.33%	1,391	2.74%	1,636
Mono	36.65%	1,062	50.55%	1,465	6.52%	189	3.17%	92	3.11%	90
Nevada	36.55%	14,060	50.86%	19,567	8.15%	3,137	2.23%	859	2.20%	846
Siskiyou	36.46%	5,547	52.55%	7,994	4.23%	644	3.77%	573	2.99%	455
Sierra	36.33%	509	50.04%	701	4.78%	67	4.28%	60	4.57%	64
Tulare	36.35%	22,456	56.39%	34,831	2.61%	1,613	1.58%	977	3.06%	1,893
Tehama	36.30%	5,444	53.95%	8,092	3.09%	464	2.45%	367	4.21%	632
Kern	35.65%	47,088	55.45%	73,249	2.80%	3,701	1.99%	2,635	4.10%	5,415
Mariposa	35.53%	2,249	53.25%	3,370	5.21%	330	1.98%	125	4.03%	255
Lassen	35.52%	2,692	54.94%	4,164	3.25%	246	2.28%	173	4.01%	304
Placer	35.28%	33,407	57.20%	54,166	3.99%	3,780	1.78%	1,684	1.74%	1,652
Yuba	35.09%	3,974	54.89%	6,216	3.98%	451	2.24%	254	3.79%	429
Madera	34.85%	8,871	57.02%	14,514	3.04%	773	2.03%	517	3.06%	780
Inyo	34.72%	2,109	55.13%	3,349	4.40%	267	2.80%	170	2.96%	180
Orange	34.74%	212,887	55.94%	342,847	3.70%	22,697	2.74%	16,766	2.88%	17,655
Colusa	34.56%	1,523	58.16%	2,563	2.50%	110	1.50%	66	3.29%	145
Shasta	34.20%	16,262	56.37%	26,806	3.32%	1,579	2.63%	1,252	3.48%	1,657
El Dorado	34.11%	18,472	56.58%	30,644	5.02%	2,718	2.17%	1,174	2.12%	1,150
Sutter	32.96%	6,144	60.09%	11,201	3.00%	560	1.36%	254	2.58%	481
Glenn	31.69%	2,004	59.84%	3,784	3.16%	200	1.90%	120	3.42%	216
Modoc	30.36%	998	60.21%	1,979	2.95%	97	2.95%	97	3.53%	116

== See also ==
- California state elections, 2002
- State of California
- California State Treasurer
