= 1998 United States Senate election in California =

- November 3, 1998
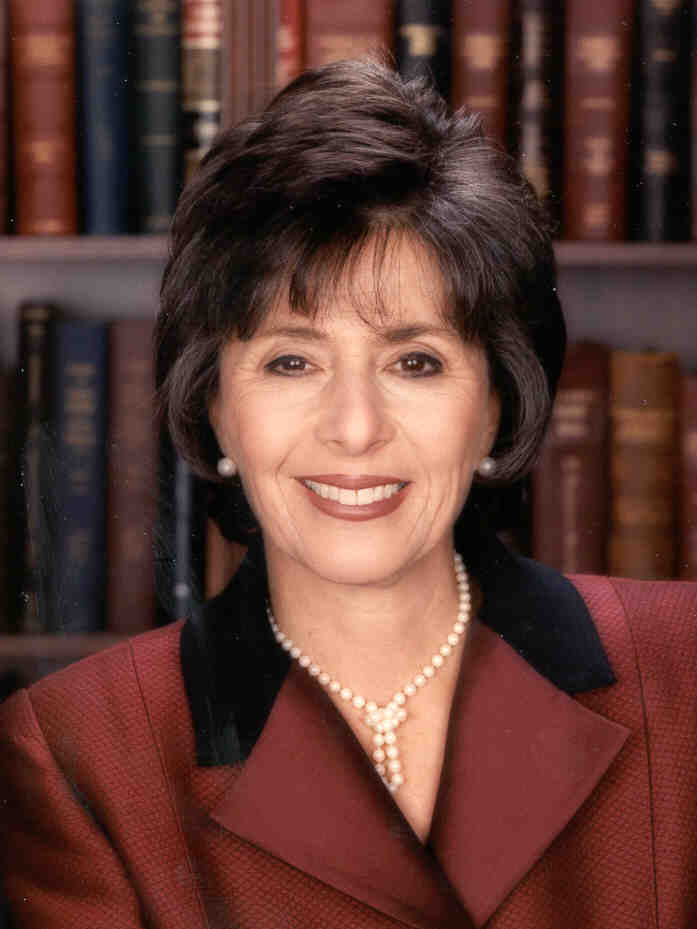

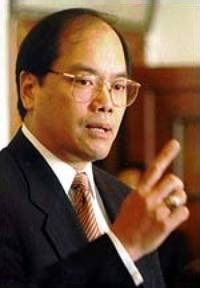
| Nominee | Barbara Boxer | Matt Fong |
| Party | Democratic | Republican |
| Popular vote | 4,411,705 | 3,576,351 |
| Percentage | 53.06% | 43.01% |
- Boxer: 40–50% 50–60% 60–70% 70–80% Fong: 40–50% 50–60% 60–70%
U.S. senator before election
Barbara Boxer
Democratic
Elected U.S. Senator
Barbara Boxer
Democratic

The 1998 United States Senate election in California was held November 3, 1998. Democratic incumbent Barbara Boxer was re-elected to a second term in office over Republican Matt Fong.

== Democratic primary ==
=== Candidates ===
- Barbara Boxer, incumbent U.S. senator since 1993
- John Pinkerton

=== Results ===
1998 California Democratic primary
| Party | Candidate | Votes | % |
|---|---|---|---|
| Democratic | Barbara Boxer (incumbent) | 2,574,264 | 92.15% |
| Democratic | John Pinkerton | 219,250 | 7.85% |
| Total votes | | 2,793,514 | 100.00% |

== Republican primary ==
=== Candidates ===
- John M. Brown, businessman
- Linh Dao, activist
- Matt Fong, California state treasurer
- Darrell Issa, businessman and activist
- Mark Raus, pharmacist
- Frank Riggs, U.S. representative from Windsor

=== Results ===
1998 California Republican primary
| Party | Candidate | Votes | % |
|---|---|---|---|
| Republican | Matt Fong | 1,292,662 | 45.28% |
| Republican | Darrell Issa | 1,142,567 | 40.02% |
| Republican | Frank Riggs | 295,886 | 10.36% |
| Republican | John M. Brown | 48,941 | 1.71% |
| Republican | Mark Raus | 45,480 | 1.59% |
| Republican | Linh Dao | 29,241 | 1.02% |
| Total votes | | 2,854,777 | 100.00% |

== Other primaries ==
1998 United States Senate primary, California (Others)
| Party | Candidate | Votes | % |
|---|---|---|---|
| Libertarian | Ted Brown | 67,408 | 100.00% |
| Peace and Freedom | Ophie C. Beltran | 52,306 | 100.00% |
| Reform | Timothy R. Erich | 45,601 | 100.00% |
| American Independent | Joseph Perrin, Sr. | 24,026 | 100.00% |
| Natural Law | Brian M. Rees | 23,945 | 100.00% |

== General election ==
=== Candidates ===
- Ophie C. Beltran (Peace & Freedom)
- Barbara Boxer, incumbent U.S. senator since 1993 (Democratic)
- Ted Brown, perennial candidate (Libertarian)
- Timothy R. Erich (Reform)
- Matt Fong, California state treasurer (Republican)
- Joseph Perrin Sr. (American Independent)
- Brian M. Rees (Natural Law)

=== Pollingolling ===
| Poll source | Date(s) | Sample size | Barbara Boxer (D) | Matt Fong (R) | Other / undecided (Note: Calculated by taking the difference of 100% and all other candidates combined.) |
|---|---|---|---|---|---|
| SurveyUSA | November 1, 1998 | 800 | 53% | 43% | 4% |
| Harris Insights & Analytics | October 30, 1998 | 5,735 | 48% | 46% | 6% |
| Mason-Dixon Polling & Strategy | October 27, 1998 | 809 | 45% | 43% | 12% |
| Field Research Corp. | October 25, 1998 | 678 | 51% | 42% | 7% |
| Harris Insights & Analytics | October 20, 1998 | 4,531 | 46% | 45% | 9% |
| Los Angeles Times | October 19, 1998 | 883 | 49% | 44% | 7% |

=== Results ===
Although most polling suggested a fairly close race, Boxer defeated Fong by a ten-point margin. As expected, Boxer did very well in Los Angeles County and the San Francisco Bay area.

1998 United States Senate election, California
| Party | Candidate | Votes | % |
|---|---|---|---|
| Democratic | Barbara Boxer (incumbent) | 4,410,056 | 53.06% |
| Republican | Matt Fong | 3,575,078 | 43.01% |
| Libertarian | Ted Brown | 93,926 | 1.13% |
| Reform | Timothy R. Erich | 82,918 | 1.00% |
| American Independent | Joseph Perrin, Sr. | 54,699 | 0.66% |
| Peace and Freedom | Ophie C. Beltran | 48,685 | 0.56% |
| Natural Law | Brian M. Rees | 46,543 | 0.59% |
| Total votes | | 8,311,905 | 100.00% |
| Turnout | | | |
| Democratic hold | | | |

==== Results by county ====
Final results from the Secretary of State of California.

| County | Boxer | Votes | Fong | Votes | Others | Votes |
|---|---|---|---|---|---|---|
| San Francisco | 75.23% | 179,889 | 21.93% | 52,443 | 2.83% | 6,777 |
| Alameda | 69.62% | 266,329 | 27.37% | 104,699 | 3.00% | 11,520 |
| Marin | 65.41% | 66,160 | 31.76% | 32,118 | 2.83% | 2,861 |
| San Mateo | 63.14% | 130,064 | 33.87% | 69,776 | 2.98% | 6,146 |
| Santa Cruz | 62.75% | 53,363 | 32.09% | 27,293 | 5.16% | 4,391 |
| Sonoma | 61.14% | 96,170 | 34.14% | 53,695 | 4.72% | 7,424 |
| Los Angeles | 60.84% | 1,198,403 | 35.78% | 704,782 | 3.37% | 66,603 |
| Yolo | 58.12% | 28,491 | 38.10% | 18,680 | 3.78% | 1,852 |
| Santa Clara | 57.81% | 242,600 | 38.21% | 160,350 | 3.99% | 16,733 |
| Mendocino | 57.73% | 16,346 | 35.84% | 10,147 | 6.44% | 1,822 |
| Contra Costa | 57.52% | 172,595 | 39.30% | 117,922 | 3.18% | 9,519 |
| Solano | 56.29% | 56,772 | 39.71% | 40,051 | 3.98% | 4,027 |
| Lake | 54.84% | 10,104 | 40.19% | 7,406 | 4.97% | 916 |
| Napa | 54.48% | 22,654 | 41.01% | 17,052 | 4.50% | 1,874 |
| Monterey | 53.17% | 46,651 | 42.63% | 37,399 | 4.19% | 3,688 |
| Imperial | 51.45% | 11,597 | 41.47% | 9,346 | 7.09% | 1,596 |
| San Benito | 51.05% | 6,428 | 44.02% | 5,543 | 4.93% | 620 |
| Humboldt | 50.60% | 23,342 | 44.16% | 20,371 | 5.25% | 2,414 |
| Sacramento | 50.46% | 180,389 | 45.86% | 163,957 | 3.68% | 13,144 |
| Santa Barbara | 49.53% | 60,911 | 46.77% | 57,512 | 3.71% | 4,554 |
| Merced | 48.39% | 19,008 | 47.45% | 18,638 | 4.17% | 1,634 |
| San Joaquin | 48.00% | 59,312 | 48.10% | 59,434 | 3.91% | 4,830 |
| San Bernardino | 47.47% | 155,093 | 47.32% | 154,591 | 5.21% | 17,033 |
| Stanislaus | 47.41% | 47,238 | 48.74% | 48,560 | 3.86% | 3,841 |
| Ventura | 46.88% | 97,207 | 48.92% | 101,440 | 4.21% | 8,716 |
| San Diego | 46.21% | 339,658 | 49.22% | 361,812 | 4.58% | 33,575 |
| Alpine | 45.86% | 249 | 49.17% | 267 | 4.96% | 27 |
| Riverside | 45.78% | 151,287 | 49.63% | 164,019 | 4.58% | 15,152 |
| Fresno | 44.28% | 75,570 | 51.81% | 88,412 | 3.91% | 6,670 |
| San Luis Obispo | 44.16% | 37,178 | 51.93% | 43,719 | 3.92% | 3,293 |
| Tuolumne | 43.74% | 8,752 | 51.43% | 10,289 | 4.82% | 966 |
| Mono | 42.84% | 1,404 | 52.46% | 1,719 | 4.70% | 154 |
| Kings | 42.75% | 9,338 | 52.87% | 11,547 | 4.38% | 957 |
| Amador | 42.21% | 5,614 | 54.11% | 7,197 | 3.68% | 489 |
| Del Norte | 41.79% | 2,992 | 52.84% | 3,783 | 5.36% | 384 |
| Calaveras | 41.44% | 6,502 | 53.04% | 8,321 | 5.53% | 866 |
| Nevada | 41.17% | 15,903 | 54.88% | 21,200 | 3.95% | 1,525 |
| Yuba | 41.01% | 5,355 | 53.38% | 6,971 | 5.60% | 732 |
| Butte | 40.73% | 26,540 | 53.89% | 35,112 | 5.36% | 3,503 |
| Trinity | 39.27% | 1,875 | 52.06% | 2,486 | 8.66% | 414 |
| Siskiyou | 39.22% | 6,162 | 55.17% | 8,669 | 5.62% | 882 |
| Tulare | 39.16% | 28,284 | 56.99% | 41,167 | 3.84% | 2,782 |
| Orange | 39.05% | 276,594 | 56.75% | 401,960 | 4.19% | 29,734 |
| Placer | 38.60% | 34,160 | 57.70% | 51,063 | 3.71% | 3,278 |
| El Dorado | 38.54% | 21,697 | 57.46% | 32,345 | 4.00% | 2,254 |
| Mariposa | 38.23% | 2,690 | 56.05% | 3,944 | 5.72% | 402 |
| Madera | 37.55% | 9,715 | 58.13% | 15,042 | 4.32% | 1,118 |
| Inyo | 37.25% | 2,443 | 57.40% | 3,764 | 5.35% | 351 |
| Colusa | 37.08% | 1,734 | 58.97% | 2,758 | 3.95% | 185 |
| Tehama | 36.98% | 6,598 | 56.68% | 10,112 | 6.34% | 1,131 |
| Kern | 36.58% | 51,476 | 59.25% | 83,391 | 4.17% | 5,870 |
| Sutter | 35.58% | 7,716 | 60.81% | 13,188 | 3.61% | 783 |
| Sierra | 34.36% | 582 | 59.50% | 1,008 | 6.14% | 104 |
| Shasta | 33.97% | 17,790 | 60.01% | 31,428 | 6.03% | 3,151 |
| Plumas | 33.05% | 2,718 | 61.52% | 5,059 | 5.43% | 446 |
| Lassen | 32.92% | 2,624 | 60.34% | 4,810 | 6.75% | 538 |
| Glenn | 31.97% | 2,321 | 62.47% | 4,536 | 5.57% | 404 |
| Modoc | 31.80% | 1,068 | 60.99% | 2,048 | 7.21% | 242 |

==== Counties that flipped from Republican to Democratic ====
- Merced
- San Bernardino
- San Benito
- Santa Barbara

==== Counties that flipped from Democratic to Republican ====
- Alpine

== See also ==
- 1998 United States Senate elections
