= 1990 California State Treasurer election =

- November 6, 1990
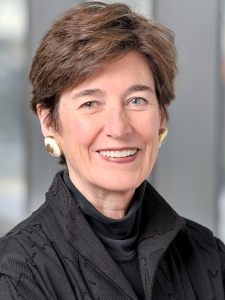
Nominee	Kathleen Brown	Thomas W. Hayes
Party	Democratic	Republican
Popular vote	3,579,389	3,347,614
Percentage	48.68%	45.53%
- County results Brown: 40–50% 50–60% 60–70% 70–80% Hayes: 40–50% 50–60% 60–70%
Treasurer before election
Thomas W. Hayes
Republican
Elected Treasurer
Kathleen Brown
Democratic

The 1990 California State Treasurer election occurred on November 6, 1990, with the primary elections took place on June 5, 1990. The Democratic nominee, attorney Kathleen Brown, defeated the incumbent Republican nominee, Thomas W. Hayes.

== Primary election ==
=== Democratic Party results ===
1990 California State Treasurer Democratic primary
Party	Candidate	Votes	%
Democratic	Kathleen Brown	1,473,268	65.43
Democratic	Wesley Sanders, Jr.	778,330	34.57
Total votes		2,251,598	100.00

=== Republican Party results ===
1990 California State Treasurer Republican primary
Party	Candidate	Votes	%
Republican	Thomas W. Hayes (incumbent)	1,026,137	53.28
Republican	Bay Buchanan	899,869	46.72
Total votes		1,926,006	100.00

=== Peace and Freedom Party results ===
1990 California State Treasurer Peace and Freedom primary
Party	Candidate	Votes	%
Peace and Freedom	Elizabeth A. Nakano	2,597	44.28
Peace and Freedom	Lewis J. Shireman	1,682	28.67
Peace and Freedom	Janet D. Lewis	1,587	27.05
Total votes		5,866	100.00

=== American Independent Party results ===
1990 California State Treasurer American Independent primary
Party	Candidate	Votes	%
American Independent	Paul Meeuwenberg	14,625	100.00
Total votes		14,625	100.00

== General election ==
=== Results ===
1990 California State Treasurer general election
Party	Candidate	Votes	%
Democratic	Kathleen Brown	3,579,389	48.68
Republican	Thomas W. Hayes (incumbent)	3,347,614	45.53
American Independent	Paul Meeuwenberg	218,255	2.97
Peace and Freedom	Elizabeth A. Nakano	207,484	2.82
Total votes		7,352,742	100.00
Democratic gain from Republican			

=== Results by county ===
County	Brown (D)		Hayes (R)		Meeuwenberg (AI)		Nakano (P&F)		Totals
County	Votes	%	Votes	%	Votes	%	Votes	%	Votes
Alameda	232,578	65.98%	99,817	28.32%	8,393	2.38%	11,711	3.32%	352,499
Alpine	150	36.06%	212	50.96%	25	6.01%	29	6.97%	416
Amador	4,613	39.59%	6,354	54.53%	437	3.75%	249	2.14%	11,653
Butte	22,207	36.77%	34,343	56.87%	2,140	3.54%	1,700	2.82%	60,390
Calaveras	5,089	40.45%	6,612	52.56%	552	4.39%	328	2.61%	12,581
Colusa	1,476	34.17%	2,651	61.38%	109	2.52%	83	1.92%	4,319
Contra Costa	135,681	53.32%	106,548	41.87%	6,194	2.43%	6,055	2.38%	254,478
Del Norte	2,715	41.62%	3,271	50.14%	316	4.84%	222	3.40%	6,524
El Dorado	16,584	36.42%	26,443	58.07%	1,465	3.22%	1,043	2.29%	45,535
Fresno	64,929	45.17%	72,328	50.31%	3,582	2.49%	2,918	2.03%	143,757
Glenn	2,397	34.86%	3,977	57.83%	354	5.15%	149	2.17%	6,877
Humboldt	21,016	45.53%	20,846	45.17%	1,525	3.30%	2,767	6.00%	46,154
Imperial	7,190	42.22%	8,609	50.55%	591	3.47%	638	3.75%	17,030
Inyo	2,458	35.30%	4,187	60.13%	183	2.63%	135	1.94%	6,963
Kern	43,719	37.40%	66,402	56.81%	4,569	3.91%	2,193	1.88%	116,883
Kings	7,151	43.15%	8,722	52.63%	421	2.54%	279	1.68%	16,573
Lake	8,447	49.53%	7,535	44.19%	632	3.71%	439	2.57%	17,053
Lassen	3,112	38.55%	4,268	52.87%	440	5.45%	253	3.13%	8,073
Los Angeles	957,451	53.11%	755,960	41.93%	40,556	2.25%	48,899	2.71%	1,802,866
Madera	7,685	40.99%	10,117	53.96%	623	3.32%	324	1.73%	18,749
Marin	52,747	57.91%	33,213	36.46%	1,929	2.12%	3,197	3.51%	91,086
Mariposa	2,607	42.00%	3,159	50.89%	284	4.58%	157	2.53%	6,207
Mendocino	14,666	53.39%	9,607	34.97%	1,108	4.03%	2,087	7.60%	27,468
Merced	13,871	45.63%	14,622	48.58%	840	2.79%	763	2.54%	30,096
Modoc	1,340	38.59%	1,817	52.33%	213	6.13%	102	2.94%	3,472
Mono	1,084	37.56%	1,620	56.13%	94	3.26%	88	3.05%	2,886
Monterey	39,701	51.02%	33,048	42.47%	2,428	3.12%	2,640	3.39%	77,817
Napa	20,209	53.10%	15,386	40.42%	1,480	3.89%	986	2.59%	38,061
Nevada	12,253	37.29%	18,578	56.54%	1,072	3.26%	958	2.92%	32,861
Orange	226,968	36.09%	368,666	58.62%	19,142	3.04%	14,115	2.24%	628,891
Placer	22,274	36.01%	36,185	58.49%	1,959	3.17%	1,443	2.33%	61,861
Plumas	3,179	41.88%	3,923	51.68%	300	3.95%	189	2.49%	7,591
Riverside	112,804	42.85%	136,598	51.88%	8,974	3.41%	4,895	1.86%	263,271
Sacramento	133,477	41.00%	175,070	53.80%	8,688	2.67%	8,219	2.53%	325,404
San Benito	4,102	49.09%	3,654	43.73%	330	3.95%	270	3.23%	8,356
San Bernardino	130,635	44.31%	145,230	49.26%	11,962	4.06%	6,978	2.37%	294,805
San Diego	279,511	43.56%	313,591	48.87%	29,611	4.61%	18,986	2.96%	641,699
San Francisco	148,439	71.43%	47,330	22.78%	3,237	1.56%	8,799	4.23%	207,805
San Joaquin	45,970	42.28%	57,602	52.98%	2,765	2.54%	2,379	2.19%	108,716
San Luis Obispo	26,750	38.95%	37,162	54.11%	2,715	3.95%	2,052	2.99%	68,679
San Mateo	104,170	58.07%	65,213	36.35%	4,476	2.49%	5,540	3.09%	179,399
Santa Barbara	46,684	42.81%	52,993	48.60%	6,282	5.76%	3,008	2.76%	109,047
Santa Clara	216,031	54.20%	156,653	39.31%	12,407	3.11%	13,461	3.38%	398,552
Santa Cruz	43,368	57.31%	25,282	33.41%	2,609	3.45%	4,411	5.83%	75,670
Shasta	18,822	39.58%	25,696	54.03%	1,861	3.91%	1,177	2.47%	47,556
Sierra	639	42.15%	770	50.79%	67	4.42%	40	2.64%	1,516
Siskiyou	6,401	42.82%	7,325	49.00%	754	5.04%	468	3.13%	14,948
Solano	45,235	54.01%	32,942	39.33%	2,970	3.55%	2,611	3.12%	83,758
Sonoma	77,065	57.49%	46,552	34.73%	4,366	3.26%	6,071	4.52%	134,054
Stanislaus	37,395	44.70%	42,459	50.75%	2,219	2.65%	1,584	1.89%	83,657
Sutter	5,518	29.70%	12,004	64.60%	555	2.99%	505	2.72%	18,582
Tehama	6,744	43.04%	7,640	48.76%	867	5.53%	419	2.67%	15,670
Trinity	2,274	42.63%	2,523	47.30%	315	5.91%	222	4.16%	5,334
Tulare	24,417	38.58%	35,868	56.67%	1,732	2.74%	1,271	2.01%	63,288
Tuolumne	8,382	44.04%	9,622	55.05%	627	3.29%	402	2.11%	19,033
Ventura	73,042	41.40%	92,662	52.53%	5,995	3.40%	4,714	2.67%	176,413
Yolo	19,328	46.97%	19,369	47.06%	942	2.29%	1,515	3.68%	41,154
Yuba	4,239	35.69%	6,807	57.31%	480	4.04%	352	2.96%	11,878
Totals	3,579,389	48.68%	3,347,614	45.53%	218,255	2.97%	207,484	2.82%	7,352,742
