= Matt Fong =

American politician (1953–2011)

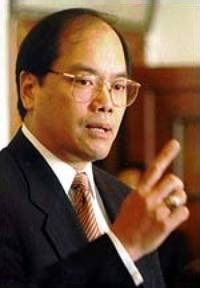

30th Treasurer of California
- In office January 2, 1995 – January 4, 1999
- Governor: Pete Wilson
- Preceded by: Kathleen Brown
- Succeeded by: Phil Angelides

Member of the California State Board of Equalization from the 4th district
- In office 1990–1995
- Preceded by: Paul B. Carpenter
- Succeeded by: Brad Sherman

Personal details
- Born: Matthew Kipling Fong; November 20, 1953 Alameda, California, U.S.
- Died: June 1, 2011 (aged 57) Pasadena, California, U.S.
- Resting place: United States Air Force Academy Cemetery
- Party: Republican
- Spouse: Paula Fong
- Children: 2
- Parent: March Fong Eu (adoptive) (mother)
- Education: United States Air Force Academy (BS); Pepperdine University (MBA); Southwestern Law School (JD)

Military service
- Allegiance: United States
- Branch/service: United States Air Force
- Years of service: 1975–1990
- Rank: Lieutenant Colonel

Chinese name
- Traditional Chinese: 鄺傑靈
- Simplified Chinese: 邝杰灵
Transcriptions
Standard Mandarin
- Hanyu Pinyin: Kuàng Jiélíng
Yue: Cantonese
- Jyutping: Kwong^{3} Git^{6} Ling^{4}

Matthew Kipling Fong (November 20, 1953 – June 1, 2011) was an American Republican politician who served as the 30th California State Treasurer. He was a government appointee, finance industry director, and consultant after retiring from the Air Force Reserve. As of 2026, Fong is the last Republican to have served as California State Treasurer.

== Life and education ==
Fong was born in Alameda, California. He was the adopted son of March Fong Eu, a Democrat who served as the 25th California Secretary of State. He graduated from Skyline High School, and went on to earn a Bachelor of Science degree at the United States Air Force Academy in 1975.

In 1982, he received an MBA at Pepperdine University, and in 1985 attained his J.D. degree at the Southwestern University School of Law in Los Angeles.

== Public career ==
Fong retired from his Air Force Reserve assignment at The Pentagon, serving as an adviser to the U.S. Secretary of the Air Force on budget and finance with the rank of lieutenant colonel in the Air Force Reserve.

=== California politics ===
In 1990, Fong unsuccessfully ran for California State Controller. He faced no competition in the Republican primary, but lost the general election to incumbent Democrat Gray Davis by almost 20 points. In 1991, Fong was appointed to the State Board of Equalization by Governor Pete Wilson. Fong would serve as Vice Chairman of the board from 1991 to 1994.

In 1994, Fong ran to succeed Kathleen Brown as State Treasurer. Fong defeated Democrat Phil Angelides to secure a four-year term beginning in January 1995.

In the 1998 U.S. Senate election, he unsuccessfully challenged incumbent California Senator Barbara Boxer. Fong earned endorsements from national Republican leaders, including Senate Majority Leader Trent Lott and House Speaker Newt Gingrich.

== Private sector career ==
He was president of the Strategic Advisory Group, providing counsel to CEOs and senior executives on strategy and business development. He was also Special Counsel to the law firm of Sheppard, Mullin, Richter & Hampton. Fong held Series 7 and 63 securities licenses and was a principal of Belstar Group, a New York-based asset manager.

Fong was an independent director of TCW Group's complex of mutual funds. He also served on two technology start-up companies' boards of directors—one dealing with earthquake detection devices (Seismic Warning Systems) and the other involved with energy-saving devices (American Grid).

U.S. President George W. Bush appointed Fong chairman of the Pension Benefit Guaranty Corporation Advisory Board. Fong also served as a Regent of Pepperdine University and a Trustee of Southwestern University School of Law.

== Personal life ==
Fong lived in Pasadena, California with his wife, Paula, with whom he had two children: Matthew II and Jade. Fong died of cancer in his Pasadena home on June 1, 2011. He is buried at the United States Air Force Academy Cemetery in Colorado Springs, Colorado. At the time of his death he was survived by his mother, his wife, and children.

Party political offices
Preceded by William Campbell	Republican nominee for Controller of California; 1990	Succeeded by Tom McClintock
Preceded by Thomas Hayes	Republican nominee for Treasurer of California; 1994	Succeeded by Curt Pringle
Preceded by Bruce Herschensohn	Republican nominee for U.S. Senator from California (Class 3); 1998	Succeeded by Bill Jones
Political offices
Preceded by Kathleen Brown	Treasurer of California; January 2, 1995 – January 4, 1999	Succeeded by Phil Angelides
