= Sutter Brown =

Former First Dog of California

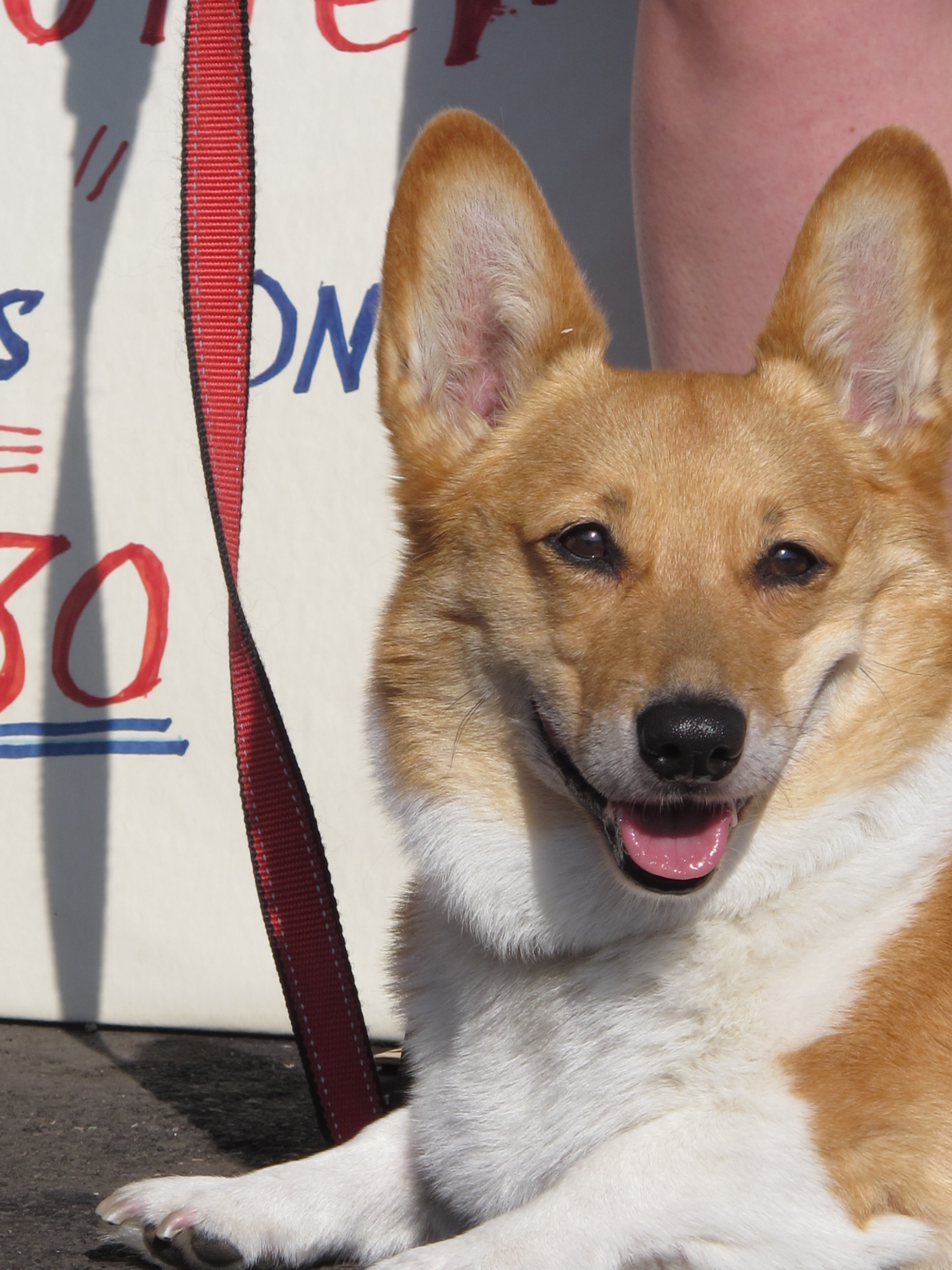
- Sutter Brown on the campaign trail in 2012
- Species: Canis lupus familiaris
- Breed: Welsh Corgi
- Sex: Male
- Born: September 24, 2003; Ketchum, Idaho
- Died: December 30, 2016 (aged 13); Sacramento, California
- Nationality: United States
- Known for: First Dog of the State of California
- Owners: Jerry Brown; Anne Gust Brown
- Appearance: Tuxedo/chestnut and white
- Named after: John Sutter

Sutter Brown (September 24, 2003 – December 30, 2016) was the pet dog of California Governor Jerry Brown and his wife, Anne Gust Brown.

Sutter was a Pembroke Welsh Corgi, originally from Ketchum, Idaho. He was named after early Sacramento settler John Sutter (known for his Sutter's Mill's role in the California Gold Rush). Sutter was first owned by Kathleen Brown, who gave the pet to her brother after he won the 2010 California gubernatorial election.

== Career ==
Sutter was adopted by the Brown family after Jerry Brown's black Labrador Dharma died in 2010. Sutter was formally introduced to the press in February 2011 by Anne Gust Brown at an event in front of the California State Capitol; the first lady said "he's going to herd the budget vote."

Jennifer Fearing, the Sacramento-based California senior state director for the Humane Society of the United States, dog-sat for Sutter and also brought him to an event promoting neutering in Los Angeles. At Fearing's suggestion, Governor Brown and the California Democratic Party took Sutter on the road in 2012 to promote the passage of California Proposition 30 (Temporary Taxes to Fund Education), an important priority for Governor Brown. The Prop 30 team took Sutter on thirty stops in thirty days at Democratic phonebanks across the state; the dog met with the Los Angeles Times editorial board and received the key to the city from the mayor of Chico in a live-television broadcast. Marc Tracy wrote in The New Republic that "Sutter actually did fit uncannily into the overall strategy" leading to Prop 30's success. Sutter was named a "Force in California Politics" by BuzzFeed and "the Corgi Who Helped California Raise Taxes" in The New Republic.

In 2013, gun rights and hunting groups criticized Fearing for her role as a regular dog-walker of Sutter. While Fearing's dog-walking was a volunteer role, the groups argued that as a registered lobbyist, Fearing should report it as an in-kind donation of services to the governor. The groups "explored" filing a complaint with the California Fair Political Practices Commission. Fearing said that the notion was ridiculous and that she had a personal, not a political relationship, with Sutter. A senior advisor to the governor also said there was no conflict of interest, saying: "Sutter is very lovable, and he'll cuddle up with anybody – especially someone who rubs his tummy. The governor knows how to wag the dog, but the dog does not wag the governor."

Sutter also engaged in a pet therapy visit for at least one state Senator in California.

== Public image ==
Sutter had been frequently seen with Governor Brown and Anne Gust Brown while the couple were in Sacramento, and he could sometimes be seen in the governor's offices. Sutter was credited as showing a warmer side that balanced the governor's cerebral, philosophical reputation and assisted in negotiation. Judy Lin of the Associated Press reported that Sutter "emerged as the warm-and-fuzzy counterpoint to the often blunt demeanor of the veteran Democratic politician [Brown], and his scratch-me-on-the-belly playfulness has disarmed even the governor's most persistent political foes during the sometimes-testy discussions over how to close the state's $27 billion deficit." Senate Republican Leader Bob Dutton said: "Sutter and I have developed a relationship."

According to the Sacramento News & Review, "Sutter's magnetism cannot be understated. When the governor's sister and original Sutter owner, Kathleen Brown, returned to reside in the state, fears that the dog might leave Sacramento caused near-panic. Reporters quickly contacted Kathleen for comment, to which she assured she would not 'disintermediate' Sutter from the governor’s care."

Sutter had a Facebook page and Twitter account dedicated to him. He was referred to by the Brown administration as the "First Dog of California" and had a page on the Governor's website, where he was listed by this title. The Los Angeles Times reported that Sutter "put a cuddly face on public programs", with the @SutterBrown Twitter account "frequently pair[ing] adorable images with reminders about policies such as a state Earned Income Tax Credit or water conservation rebates."

== Death ==
In October 2016, Sutter became gravely ill and underwent treatment at an animal hospital in the Sacramento area. He died on December 30, 2016, at the age of 13, from cancer.

== See also ==
- List of individual dogs
