= 1990 California lieutenant gubernatorial election =

- November 6, 1990
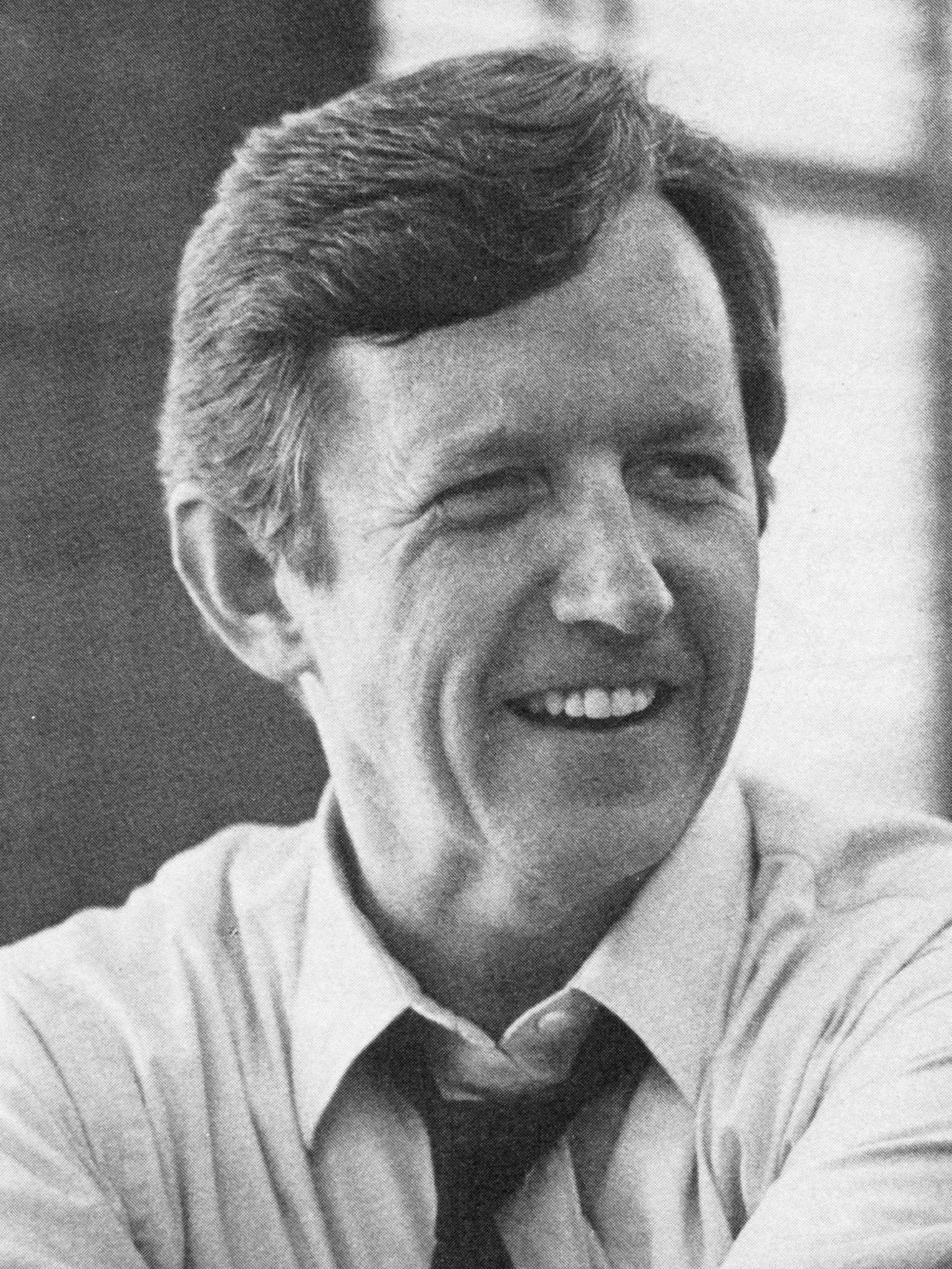

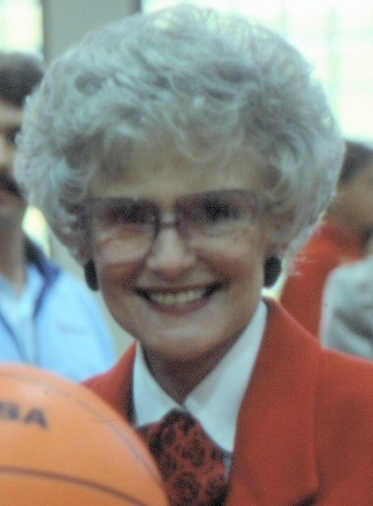
Nominee	Leo T. McCarthy	Marian Bergeson
Party	Democratic	Republican
Popular vote	3,874,308	3,186,508
Percentage	51.29%	42.18%
- County results McCarthy: 40–50% 50–60% 60–70% 70–80% Bergeson: 40–50% 50–60%
Lieutenant Governor before election
Leo T. McCarthy
Democratic
Elected Lieutenant Governor
Leo T. McCarthy
Democratic

The 1990 California lieutenant gubernatorial election was held on November 6, 1990. Incumbent Democrat Leo T. McCarthy defeated Republican nominee Marian Bergeson with 51.29% of the vote.

== Primary elections ==
Primary elections were held on June 5, 1990.

=== Democratic primary ===
==== Candidates ====
- Leo T. McCarthy, incumbent Lieutenant Governor

==== Results ====
Democratic primary results
Party	Candidate	Votes	%
Democratic	Leo T. McCarthy (incumbent)	2,234,813	100.00
Total votes		2,234,813	100.00

=== Republican primary ===
==== Candidates ====
- Marian Bergeson, State Senator from Newport Beach
- John Seymour, State Senator from Anaheim

==== Results ====
Republican primary results
Party	Candidate	Votes	%
Republican	Marian Bergeson	1,080,519	55.50
Republican	John Seymour	866,218	44.50
Total votes		1,946,737	100.00

== General election ==
=== Candidates ===
Major party candidates

- Leo T. McCarthy, Democratic
- Marian Bergeson, Republican

Other candidates

- Anthony Bajada, Libertarian
- Clyde Kuhn, Peace and Freedom
- Merton D. Short, American Independent

=== Results ===
1990 California lieutenant gubernatorial election
Party	Candidate	Votes	%	±%
Democratic	Leo T. McCarthy (incumbent)	3,874,308	51.29%	−2.65%
Republican	Marian Bergeson	3,186,508	42.18%	−0.32%
Libertarian	Anthony Bajada	214,187	2.84%	+1.61%
Peace and Freedom	Clyde Kuhn	143,200	1.90%	+0.99%
American Independent	Merton D. Short	136,097	1.80%	+0.38%
Majority		687,800		
Turnout				
Democratic hold		Swing		
