= 1994 California gubernatorial election =

- November 8, 1994
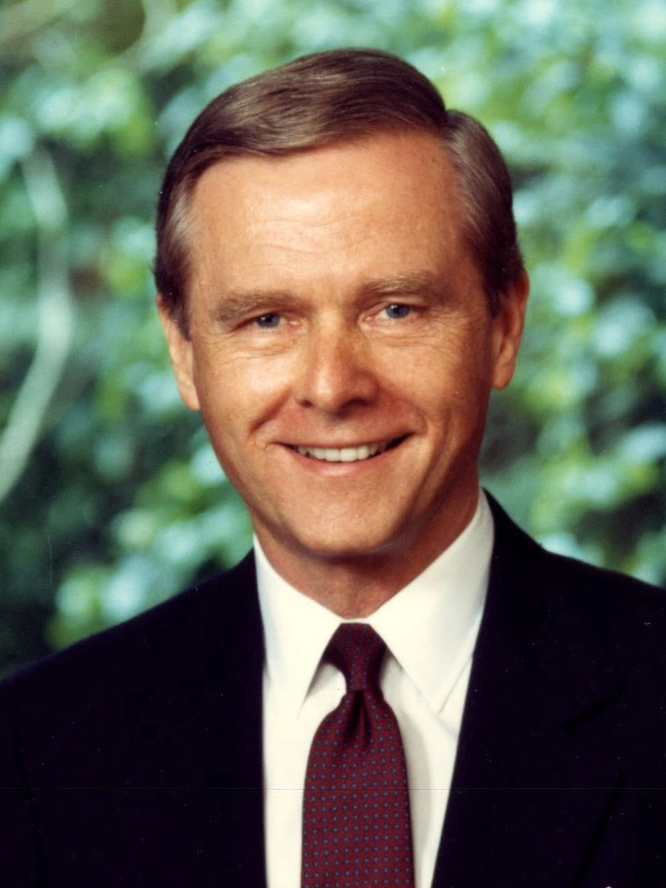

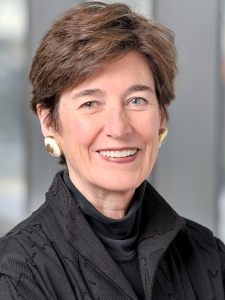
Nominee	Pete Wilson	Kathleen Brown
Party	Republican	Democratic
Popular vote	4,781,766	3,519,799
Percentage	55.18%	40.62%
- Wilson: 40–50% 50–60% 60–70% 70–80% Brown: 40–50% 50–60% 60–70%
Governor before election
Pete Wilson
Republican
Elected Governor
Pete Wilson
Republican

The 1994 California gubernatorial election was held on November 8, 1994, in the midst of that year's "Republican Revolution". Incumbent Republican Pete Wilson easily won re-election over his main challenger, Democratic State Treasurer Kathleen Brown, the daughter of Pat Brown and younger sister of Jerry Brown, both of whom had previously served as governor. Primaries were held on June 3, 1994.

Although Wilson initially trailed Brown in the polls as a result of the state's faltering economy, his signature opposition to affirmative action and state services for illegal immigrants (with the associated Proposition 187) eventually led to his win. Wilson won 25% of the African-American vote, a fairly strong performance for a Republican; however, he won only 25% of the Latino vote, a weak performance which was widely attributed to his support of Proposition 187. This was the first California gubernatorial election since 1974 in which the winner was of a different party from the incumbent president.

== Republican primary ==
=== Candidates ===
- Louis Darrigo, Aptos farmer and contractor
- Jim Hart, San Diego resident
- Ron Unz, Palo Alto businessman
- Pete Wilson, incumbent Governor

=== Results ===
Republican primary results
Party	Candidate	Votes	%
Republican	Pete Wilson (incumbent)	1,266,832	61.44%
Republican	Ron Unz	707,431	34.31%
Republican	Jim Hart	44,083	2.14%
Republican	Louis Darrigo	43,448	2.11%
Republican	Mike Eagles (write-in)	34	0.00%
Invalid or blank votes		92,580	4.30%
Total votes		2,061,828	100.00%

== Democratic primary ==
=== Candidates ===
- Kathleen Brown, California Treasurer
- Mark Calney, Los Angeles resident
- John Garamendi, California Insurance Commissioner and candidate for Governor in 1982
- Tom Hayden, State Senator from Los Angeles
- Charles Pineda Jr., Sacramento criminal justice administrator
- Jonathan Trip, Burbank business consultant

=== Results ===
Democratic primary results
Party	Candidate	Votes	%
Democratic	Kathleen Brown	1,110,372	48.38%
Democratic	John Garamendi	755,876	32.93%
Democratic	Tom Hayden	318,777	13.89%
Democratic	Charles Pineda Jr.	57,314	2.50%
Democratic	Jonathan Trip	31,716	1.38%
Democratic	Mark Calney	21,121	0.92%
Invalid or blank votes		139,710	5.74%
Total votes		2,295,176	100.00%

== Minor party primaries ==
=== American Independent Party ===
American Independent primary results
Party	Candidate	Votes	%
American Independent	Jerome McCready	18,984	100.00%
Invalid or blank votes		19,710	50.94%
Total votes		18,984	100.00%

=== Green Party ===
Green primary results
Party	Candidate	Votes	%
Green	None of the Above	8,185	46.18%
Green	John T. Selawsky	3,688	20.81%
Green	James Ogle	2,930	16.53%
Green	John Lewallen	2,923	16.49%
Invalid or blank votes		4,527	20.34%
Total votes		17,726	100.00%

=== Libertarian Party ===
Libertarian primary results
Party	Candidate	Votes	%
Libertarian	Richard Rider	13,757	100.00%
Invalid or blank votes		3,208	18.91%
Total votes		13,757	100.00%

=== Peace and Freedom Party ===
Peace and Freedom primary results
Party	Candidate	Votes	%
Peace and Freedom	Gloria Estela La Riva	4,633	100.00%
Invalid or blank votes		2,805	37.71%
Total votes		4,633	100.00%

== General election ==
=== Candidates ===
- Kathleen Brown, California Treasurer (Democratic)
- Gloria Estela LaRiva, San Francisco political organizer and printer (Peace and Freedom)
- Jerome McCready, Castroville businessman (American Independent)
- Richard Rider, San Diego stockbroker and financial planner (Libertarian)
- Pete Wilson, incumbent Governor and former U.S. Senator (Republican)

=== Polling ===
Source	Date	Pete Wilson	Kathleen Brown
KNBC-TV	November 4, 1994	48%	44%
KCAL-TV	November 3, 1994	49%	39%
Field Poll	November 1, 1994	50%	41%
San Francisco Examiner	October 23, 1994	48%	43%
Los Angeles Times	October 16, 1994	50%	42%
KCAL-TV	October 7, 1994	48%	38%
Los Angeles Times	September 16, 1994	46%	44%

=== Results ===

1994 California gubernatorial election
Party	Candidate	Votes	%	±%
Republican	Pete Wilson (incumbent)	4,781,766	55.18%	+5.93%
Democratic	Kathleen Brown	3,519,799	40.62%	−5.17%
Libertarian	Richard Rider	149,281	1.72%	−0.17%
American Independent	Jerome McCready	133,888 (Note: Includes 18 write-in votes for "Jerome N. McCready")	1.55%	−0.27%
Peace and Freedom	Gloria Estela La Riva	80,440	0.93%	−0.33%
Independent	Aaron Boxerman (write-in)	130	0.00%	
Independent	Nick Miloslavich (write-in)	46	0.00%	
Independent	Thomas L. Sailers (write-in)	16	0.00%	
Independent	Tim Oster (write-in)	9	0.00%	
Invalid or blank votes		235,261	2.64%	
Majority		1,261,967	14.56%	
Total votes		8,665,375	100.00%	
Republican hold		Swing	+14.56%	

=== Results by county ===
County	Pete Wilson Republican		Kathleen Brown Democratic		Richard Rider Libertarian		Jerome McCready AIP		Gloria La Riva PFP		All Others Write-in		Margin		Total votes cast
County	#	%	#	%	#	%	#	%	#	%	#	%	#	%	Total votes cast
Alameda	147,238	36.61%	240,490	59.80%	5,810	1.44%	4,161	1.03%	4,460	1.11%	6 (Note: 5 for Miloslavich, 1 for Sailers)	0.00%	-93,252	-23.19%	402,165
Alpine	389	56.54%	240	34.88%	11	1.60%	28	4.07%	20	2.91%	0	0.00%	149	21.66%	688
Amador	8,781	66.81%	3,776	28.73%	257	1.96%	261	1.99%	68	0.52%	0	0.00%	5,005	38.08%	13,143
Butte	42,998	62.88%	21,887	32.01%	1,389	2.03%	1,562	2.28%	546	0.80%	1 (Note: 1 for Miloslavich)	0.00%	21,111	30.87%	68,383
Calaveras	10,438	66.08%	4,432	28.06%	415	2.63%	361	2.29%	149	0.94%	0	0.00%	6,006	38.02%	15,795
Colusa	3,691	72.70%	1,202	23.68%	72	1.42%	83	1.63%	29	0.57%	0	0.00%	2,489	49.03%	5,077
Contra Costa	154,482	51.47%	135,133	45.02%	4,483	1.49%	3,998	1.33%	2,039	0.68%	5 (Note: 1 for Boxerman, 4 for Miloslavich)	0.00%	19,349	6.45%	300,140
Del Norte	4,626	61.83%	2,372	31.70%	148	1.98%	278	3.72%	58	0.78%	0	0.00%	2,254	30.13%	7,482
El Dorado	36,695	67.14%	15,289	27.97%	1,206	2.21%	1,124	2.06%	340	0.62%	0	0.00%	21,406	39.17%	54,654
Fresno	112,851	62.83%	60,958	33.94%	2,153	1.20%	2,146	1.19%	1,496	0.83%	14 (Note: 4 for Boxerman, 3 for Miloslavich, 3 for Sailers, 4 for Oster)	0.01%	51,893	28.89%	179,618
Glenn	5,916	73.54%	1,719	21.37%	142	1.77%	217	2.70%	51	0.63%	0	0.00%	4,197	52.17%	8,045
Humboldt	23,586	49.34%	21,162	44.27%	1,164	2.43%	1,088	2.28%	805	1.68%	2 (Note: 2 for Boxerman)	0.00%	2,424	5.07%	47,807
Imperial	13,208	54.97%	9,525	39.64%	286	1.19%	341	1.42%	667	2.78%	0	0.00%	3,683	15.33%	24,027
Inyo	5,054	69.51%	1,878	25.83%	132	1.82%	149	2.05%	58	0.80%	0	0.00%	3,176	43.68%	7,271
Kern	105,733	69.49%	39,137	25.72%	2,711	1.78%	3,191	2.10%	1,389	0.91%	1 (Note: 1 for Boxerman)	0.00%	66,596	43.77%	152,162
Kings	14,750	65.02%	7,097	31.28%	287	1.27%	350	1.54%	202	0.89%	0	0.00%	7,653	33.73%	22,686
Lake	11,416	57.88%	7,279	36.90%	423	2.14%	450	2.28%	156	0.79%	0	0.00%	4,137	20.97%	19,724
Lassen	4,827	58.63%	2,671	32.44%	277	3.36%	383	4.65%	75	0.91%	0	0.00%	2,156	26.19%	8,233
Los Angeles	1,043,835	50.43%	953,301	46.06%	28,368	1.37%	23,469	1.13%	20,910	1.01%	6 (Note: 5 for Boxerman, 1 for Oster)	0.00%	90,534	4.37%	2,069,889
Madera	18,623	69.24%	7,223	26.85%	311	1.16%	563	2.09%	177	0.66%	0	0.00%	11,400	42.38%	26,897
Marin	45,983	43.35%	56,665	53.43%	1,679	1.58%	958	0.90%	777	0.73%	1 (Note: 1 for Boxerman)	0.00%	-10,682	-10.07%	106,063
Mariposa	4,699	65.18%	2,178	30.21%	121	1.68%	172	2.39%	39	0.54%	0	0.00%	2,521	34.97%	7,209
Mendocino	14,645	48.37%	13,716	45.30%	767	2.53%	590	1.95%	561	1.85%	0	0.00%	929	3.07%	30,279
Merced	24,873	62.90%	13,197	33.37%	444	1.12%	763	1.93%	267	0.68%	0	0.00%	11,676	29.53%	39,544
Modoc	1,972	51.47%	1,257	32.81%	217	5.66%	337	8.80%	48	1.25%	0	0.00%	715	18.66%	3,831
Mono	2,263	64.88%	1,051	30.13%	88	2.52%	60	1.72%	26	0.75%	0	0.00%	1,212	34.75%	3,488
Monterey	49,565	53.89%	38,597	41.96%	1,228	1.34%	1,843	2.00%	738	0.80%	8 (Note: 1 for Boxerman, 6 for Miloslavich, 1 for Oster)	0.01%	10,968	11.92%	91,979
Napa	23,429	54.69%	17,454	40.74%	764	1.78%	835	1.95%	357	0.83%	0	0.00%	5,975	13.95%	42,839
Nevada	25,159	65.97%	11,283	29.59%	805	2.11%	658	1.73%	230	0.30%	0	0.00%	13,876	36.39%	38,135
Orange	516,811	67.72%	211,132	27.67%	16,351	2.14%	13,566	1.78%	5,274	0.69%	5 (Note: 5 for Boxerman)	0.00%	305,679	40.06%	763,139
Placer	51,213	67.02%	21,915	28.68%	1,570	2.05%	1,299	1.70%	413	0.54%	0	0.00%	29,298	38.34%	76,410
Plumas	5,492	63.87%	2,630	30.58%	210	2.44%	210	2.44%	57	0.66%	0	0.00%	2,862	33.28%	8,599
Riverside	221,027	64.17%	107,207	31.13%	6,085	1.77%	7,182	2.09%	2,858	0.83%	58 (Note: 57 for Boxerman, 1 for Miloslavich)	0.02%	113,820	33.05%	344,417
Sacramento	196,229	54.79%	146,423	40.88%	6,507	1.82%	5,881	1.64%	3,111	0.87%	5 (Note: 2 for Boxerman, 3 for Oster)	0.00%	49,806	13.91%	358,156
San Benito	6,398	54.17%	4,852	41.08%	249	2.11%	212	1.79%	100	0.85%	0	0.00%	1,546	13.09%	11,811
San Bernardino	217,085	62.30%	112,636	32.32%	7,148	2.05%	7,916	2.27%	3,691	1.06%	0	0.00%	104,449	29.97%	348,476
San Diego	477,439	63.35%	240,937	31.97%	16,388	2.17%	12,395	1.64%	6,493	0.86%	8 (Note: 8 for Boxerman)	0.00%	236,502	31.38%	753,660
San Francisco	66,494	27.81%	165,279	69.12%	2,561	1.07%	1,073	0.45%	3,704	1.55%	2 (Note: 2 for Boxerman)	0.00%	-98,785	-41.31%	239,113
San Joaquin	78,682	61.35%	44,787	34.92%	1,669	1.30%	2,119	1.65%	984	0.77%	2 (Note: 2 for Boxerman)	0.00%	33,895	26.43%	128,243
San Luis Obispo	52,270	60.07%	30,686	35.27%	1,681	1.93%	1,688	1.94%	672	0.77%	12 (Note: 12 for Boxerman)	0.01%	21,584	24.81%	87,009
San Mateo	102,989	47.63%	106,391	49.21%	3,080	1.42%	2,244	1.04%	1,498	0.69%	14 (Note: 1 for Boxerman, 2 for Miloslavich, 11 for Sailers)	0.01%	-3,402	-1.57%	216,216
Santa Barbara	75,051	56.68%	52,420	39.59%	1,817	1.37%	2,075	1.57%	1,048	0.79%	1 (Note: 1 for Miloslavich)	0.00%	22,631	17.09%	132,412
Santa Clara	212,075	47.50%	211,904	47.46%	10,143	2.27%	7,393	1.66%	4,922	1.10%	32 (Note: 15, Boxerman, 16 for Miloslavich, 1 for Sailers)	0.01%	171	0.04%	446,469
Santa Cruz	37,927	41.09%	49,272	53.39%	2,159	2.34%	1,490	1.61%	1,439	1.56%	7	0.01%	-11,345	-12.29%	92,294
Shasta	37,577	68.45%	13,633	24.84%	1,195	2.18%	2,034	3.71%	455	0.83%	0	0.00%	23,944	43.62%	54,894
Sierra	1,018	61.77%	528	32.04%	41	2.49%	51	3.09%	10	0.61%	0	0.00%	490	29.73%	1,648
Siskiyou	11,075	60.17%	6,053	32.88%	474	2.58%	643	3.49%	161	0.87%	1 (Note: 1 for Boxerman)	0.01%	5,022	27.28%	18,407
Solano	51,265	51.89%	43,170	43.70%	1,753	1.77%	1,765	1.79%	836	0.85%	1 (Note: 1 for Boxerman)	0.00%	8,095	8.19%	98,790
Sonoma	73,234	45.65%	79,720	49.69%	3,270	2.04%	2,540	1.58%	1,663	1.04%	1 (Note: 1 for Boxerman)	0.00%	-6,486	-4.04%	160,428
Stanislaus	60,992	60.68%	35,080	34.90%	1,569	1.56%	2,146	2.14%	722	0.72%	1 (Note: 1 for Miloslavich)	0.00%	25,912	25.78%	100,510
Sutter	15,997	72.11%	5,293	23.86%	320	1.44%	458	2.06%	115	0.52%	0	0.00%	10,704	48.25%	22,183
Tehama	12,836	68.77%	4,626	24.78%	440	2.36%	631	3.38%	133	0.71%	0	0.00%	8,210	43.98%	18,666
Trinity	3,078	56.88%	1,783	32.95%	181	3.35%	285	5.27%	83	1.53%	1 (Note: 1 for Boxerman)	0.02%	1,295	23.93%	5,411
Tulare	54,267	69.02%	21,634	27.52%	856	1.09%	1,241	1.58%	628	0.80%	0	0.00%	32,633	41.50%	78,626
Tuolumne	12,706	64.41%	6,117	31.01%	369	1.87%	421	2.13%	113	0.57%	0	0.00%	6,589	33.40%	19,726
Ventura	136,417	62.36%	73,163	33.44%	3,894	1.78%	3,366	1.54%	1,927	0.88%	1 (Note: 1 for Boxerman)	0.00%	63,254	28.91%	218,768
Yolo	23,019	46.58%	24,357	49.28%	846	1.71%	713	1.44%	481	0.97%	5 (Note: 5 for Boxerman)	0.01%	-1,338	-2.71%	49,421
Yuba	9,378	65.95%	4,002	28.14%	297	2.09%	432	3.04%	111	0.78%	0	0.00%	5,376	37.81%	14,220
Total	4,781,766	55.18%	3,519,799	40.62%	149,281	1.72%	133,888	1.55%	80,440	0.93%	201	0.00%	1,261,967	14.56%	8,665,375

==== Counties that flipped from Democratic to Republican ====
- Contra Costa
- Lake
- Los Angeles
- Mendocino
- Monterey
- Napa
- San Benito
- Santa Clara
- Solano
