= ScholarShare =

Scholarshare is the California State 529 plan, a tax-advantaged investment vehicle designed to encourage saving for the future higher education expenses of a designated beneficiary.
