= 1990 California Superintendent of Public Instruction election =

1990 California election

- June 5, 1990
Nominee	Bill Honig	Samuel Rodriguez	Carol S. Koppel
Party	Nonpartisan	Nonpartisan	Nonpartisan
Popular vote	2,554,143	784,297	765,039
Percentage	55.11%	16.92%	16.50%
Nominee	Mark Isler
Party	Nonpartisan
Popular vote	531,900
Percentage	11.47%
- Honig: 40–50% 50–60% 60–70% 70–80%
SPI before election
Bill Honig
Nonpartisan
Elected SPI
Bill Honig
Nonpartisan

The 1990 California State Superintendent of Public Instruction election occurred on June 5, 1990. The incumbent, Bill Honig, defeated his opponents in the first round by receiving a majority of the vote, so no runoff election occurred. The office is officially nonpartisan, so no political party is listed on the ballot for the candidates.

== General election ==
=== Results ===
1990 California State Superintendent of Public Instruction general election
Candidate	Votes	%
Bill Honig (incumbent)	2,554,143	55.11
Samuel Rodriguez	784,297	16.92
Carol S. Koppel	765,039	16.50
Mark Isler	531,900	11.47
Total votes	4,635,379	100.00

=== Results by county ===
County	Honig		Rodriguez		Koppel		Isler		Totals
County	Votes	%	Votes	%	Votes	%	Votes	%	Votes
Alameda	152,049	66.78%	29,327	12.88%	29,305	12.87%	16,991	7.46%	227,672
Alpine	234	58.06%	61	15.14%	57	14.14%	51	12.66%	403
Amador	4,800	51.86%	1,288	13.92%	1,758	19.00%	1,409	15.22%	9,255
Butte	22,997	52.93%	6,993	16.10%	7,122	16.39%	6,332	14.58%	43,444
Calaveras	5,451	53.86%	1,393	13.76%	1,816	17.94%	1,460	14.43%	10,120
Colusa	2,118	55.93%	484	12.78%	668	17.64%	517	13.65%	3,787
Contra Costa	119,782	66.70%	21,588	12.02%	22,036	12.27%	16,178	9.01%	179,584
Del Norte	2,612	49.54%	931	17.66%	1,062	20.14%	667	12.65%	5,272
El Dorado	16,848	51.74%	5,144	15.80%	6,058	18.60%	4,514	13.86%	32,564
Fresno	55,087	57.71%	15,839	16.59%	13,352	13.99%	11,174	11.71%	95,452
Glenn	3,351	53.60%	886	14.17%	1,127	18.03%	888	14.20%	6,252
Humboldt	19,421	57.94%	4,756	14.19%	5,930	17.69%	3,415	10.19%	33,522
Imperial	6,490	46.43%	3,681	26.34%	2,134	15.27%	1,672	11.96%	13,977
Inyo	2,903	53.84%	1,002	18.58%	929	17.23%	558	10.35%	5,392
Kern	39,530	47.55%	16,622	19.99%	15,691	18.87%	11,292	13.58%	83,135
Kings	6,050	53.38%	2,286	20.17%	1,858	16.39%	1,130	9.97%	11,334
Lake	7,383	55.04%	1,865	13.90%	2,249	16.77%	1,916	14.28%	13,413
Lassen	2,921	47.92%	882	14.47%	1,355	22.23%	937	15.37%	6,095
Los Angeles	580,466	54.52%	197,357	18.54%	167,995	15.78%	118,912	11.17%	1,064,730
Madera	5,346	50.22%	2,280	21.42%	1,709	16.05%	1,310	12.31%	10,645
Marin	42,073	71.44%	5,313	9.02%	7,317	12.42%	4,188	7.11%	58,891
Mariposa	2,881	54.83%	843	16.04%	840	15.99%	690	13.13%	5,254
Mendocino	10,686	59.69%	2,619	14.63%	2,793	15.60%	1,803	10.07%	17,901
Merced	8,954	53.99%	3,212	19.37%	2,957	17.83%	1,462	8.82%	16,585
Modoc	1,496	48.23%	405	13.06%	707	22.79%	494	15.93%	3,102
Mono	1,461	60.72%	278	11.55%	412	17.12%	255	10.60%	2,406
Monterey	30,362	54.88%	9,541	17.24%	9,625	17.40%	5,795	10.47%	55,323
Napa	17,892	60.77%	3,466	11.77%	4,422	15.02%	3,660	12.43%	29,440
Nevada	12,719	53.57%	3,526	14.85%	4,506	10.56%	2,991	12.60%	23,742
Orange	171,895	46.10%	75,376	20.21%	68,739	18.43%	56,869	15.25%	372,879
Placer	19,729	47.71%	7,228	17.48%	8,639	20.89%	5,756	13.92%	41,352
Plumas	3,536	54.70%	854	13.21%	1,296	20.05%	778	12.04%	6,464
Riverside	72,141	45.71%	31,160	19.74%	32,454	20.56%	22,074	13.99%	157,829
Sacramento	109,165	52.42%	33,692	16.18%	39,375	18.91%	26,037	12.50%	208,269
San Benito	3,760	51.05%	1,401	19.02%	1,500	20.37%	704	9.56%	7,365
San Bernardino	75,532	45.42%	33,001	19.84%	36,880	22.18%	20,895	12.56%	166,308
San Diego	200,965	51.05%	68,387	17.37%	74,993	19.05%	49,340	12.53%	393,685
San Francisco	92,306	75.05%	11,131	9.05%	12,814	10.42%	6,749	5.49%	123,000
San Joaquin	40,498	53.19%	14,953	19.64%	12,744	16.74%	7,942	10.43%	76,137
San Luis Obispo	27,283	51.91%	9,036	17.19%	10,352	19.70%	5,886	11.20%	52,557
San Mateo	62,362	68.95%	10,201	11.28%	10,594	11.71%	7,287	8.06%	90,444
Santa Barbara	43,697	60.38%	10,840	14.98%	10,947	15.13%	6,884	9.51%	72,368
Santa Clara	147,612	58.68%	43,366	17.24%	36,280	14.42%	24,290	9.66%	251,548
Santa Cruz	30,972	61.21%	6,724	13.29%	7,656	15.13%	5,246	10.37%	50,598
Shasta	16,412	46.06%	10,552	29.61%	5,212	14.63%	3,459	9.71%	35,635
Sierra	858	60.55%	157	11.08%	226	15.95%	176	12.42%	1,417
Siskiyou	5,918	50.50%	2,162	18.45%	2,189	18.68%	1,450	12.37%	11,719
Solano	28,991	54.22%	8,470	15.84%	9,103	17.02%	6,906	12.92%	53,470
Sonoma	57,815	60.85%	11,955	12.58%	13,905	14.63%	11,343	11.94%	95,018
Stanislaus	31,561	54.26%	10,682	18.36%	9,093	15.63%	6,834	11.75%	58,170
Sutter	8,265	52.18%	2,357	14.88%	2,798	17.67%	2,418	15.27%	15,838
Tehama	5,845	48.35%	2,118	17.52%	2,358	19.51%	1,768	14.63%	12,089
Trinity	2,055	51.41%	672	16.81%	696	17.41%	574	14.36%	3,997
Tulare	24,158	51.59%	8,801	18.79%	7,536	16.09%	6,334	13.53%	46,829
Tuolumne	7,738	56.46%	2,164	15.79%	2,206	16.10%	1,597	11.65%	13,705
Ventura	56,385	52.31%	17,589	16.32%	19,559	18.14%	14,262	13.23%	107,795
Yolo	18,123	57.75%	4,148	13.22%	5,255	16.75%	3,856	12.29%	31,382
Yuba	4,203	47.82%	1,251	14.23%	1,810	20.59%	1,525	17.35%	8,789
Totals	2,554,143	55.11%	784,297	16.92%	765,039	16.50%	531,900	11.47%	4,635,379
