= 1990 California State Controller election =

1990 California election

- November 6, 1990
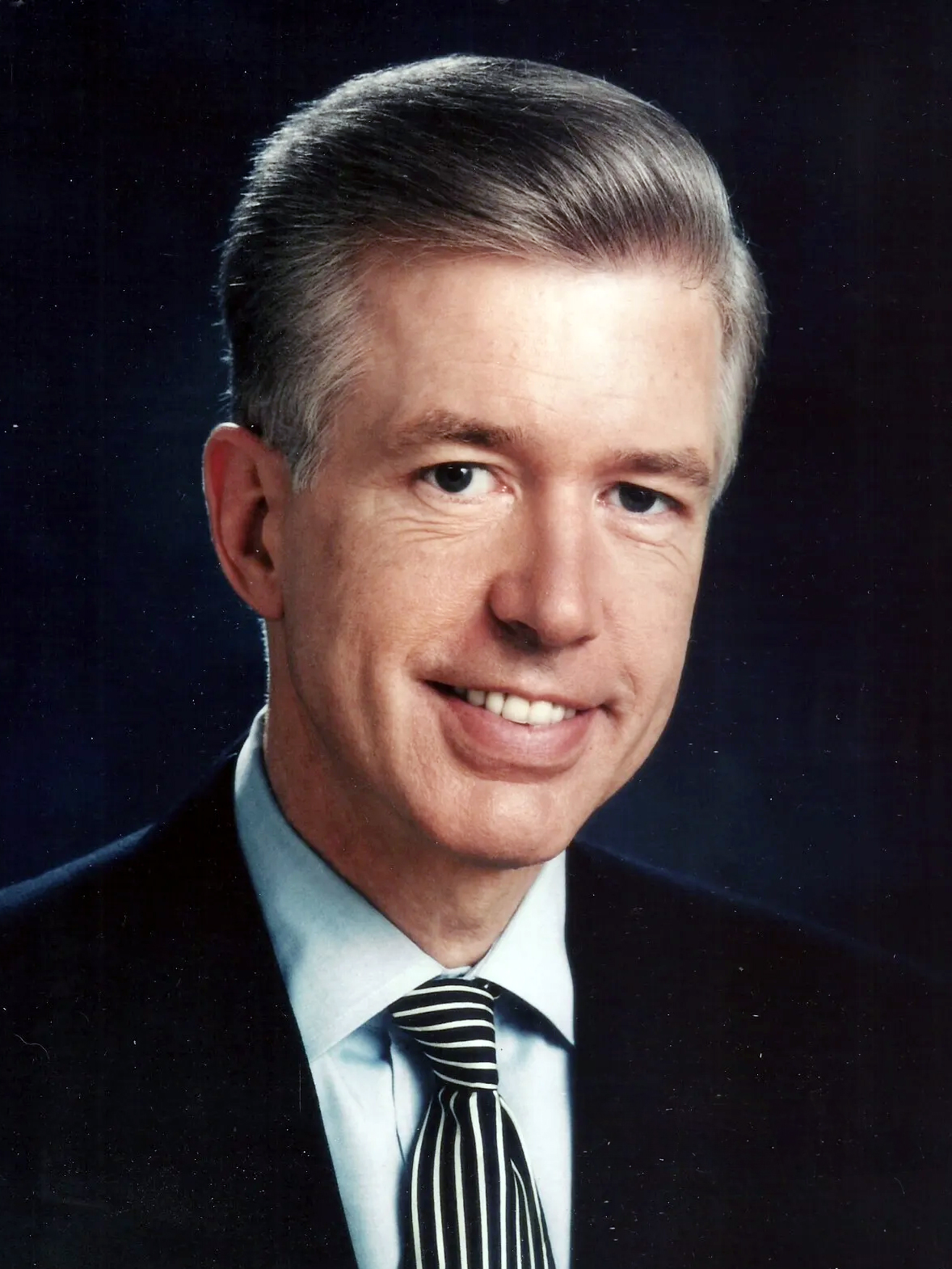

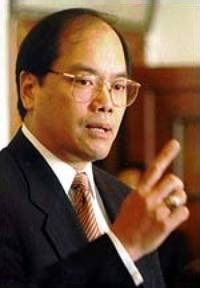
Nominee	Gray Davis	Matt Fong
Party	Democratic	Republican
Popular vote	4,153,534	2,700,696
Percentage	56.12%	36.49%
- County results Davis: 40–50% 50–60% 60–70% 70–80% Fong: 50–60%
Controller before election
Gray Davis
Democratic
Elected Controller
Gray Davis
Democratic

The 1990 California State Controller election was held on November 6, 1990, to elect the state controller of California. Primary elections took place on June 5, 1990. The incumbent Democrat Gray Davis, defeated the Republican nominee, Matt Fong.

== Primary election ==
=== Democratic Party results ===
1990 California State Controller Democratic primary
Party	Candidate	Votes	%
Democratic	Gray Davis (incumbent)	2,216,435	100.00
Total votes		2,216,435	100.00

=== Republican Party results ===
1990 California State Controller Republican primary
Party	Candidate	Votes	%
Republican	Matt Fong	1,690,208	100.00
Total votes		1,690,208	100.00

=== Peace and Freedom Party results ===
1990 California State Controller Peace and Freedom primary
Party	Candidate	Votes	%
Peace and Freedom	Richard D. Rose	2,063	35.44
Peace and Freedom	Genevieve Torres	1,903	32.69
Peace and Freedom	Shirley Rachel Isaacson	1,855	31.87
Total votes		5,821	100.00

=== American Independent Party results ===
1990 California State Controller American Independent primary
Party	Candidate	Votes	%
American Independent	Edmon V. Kaiser	14,493	100.00
Total votes		14,493	100.00

=== Libertarian Party results ===
1990 California State Controller Libertarian primary
Party	Candidate	Votes	%
Libertarian	Thomas Tryon	11,758	100.00
Total votes		11,758	100.00

== General election ==
=== Results ===
1990 California State Controller general election
Party	Candidate	Votes	%
Democratic	Gray Davis (incumbent)	4,153,534	56.12
Republican	Matt Fong	2,700,696	36.49
Libertarian	Thomas Tryon	273,524	3.70
Peace and Freedom	Richard D. Rose	147,606	1.99
American Independent	Edmon V. Kaiser	125,867	1.70
No party	Nell Wheeler-Martenis (write-in)	58	0.00
Total votes		7,401,285	100.00
Democratic hold			

=== Results by county ===
Final election results by county from the California Secretary of State:

County	Davis (D)		Fong (R)		Tryon (L)		Rose (P&F)		Kaiser (AI)		Write-in (WI)		Totals
County	Votes	%	Votes	%	Votes	%	Votes	%	Votes	%	Votes	%	Votes
Alameda	240,637	65.95%	98,731	27.06%	10,850	2.97%	8,690	2.38%	5,965	1.63%	7	0.00%	364,880
Alpine	194	45.75%	165	38.92%	31	7.31%	18	4.25%	16	3.77%	0	0.00%	424
Amador	6,816	57.61%	3,805	32.16%	745	6.30%	203	1.72%	263	2.22%	0	0.00%	11,832
Butte	31,760	52.07%	24,332	39.89%	2,494	4.09%	1,047	1.72%	1,364	2.24%	0	0.00%	60,997
Calaveras	6,417	50.03%	3,569	27.83%	2,429	18.94%	175	1.36%	236	1.84%	0	0.00%	12,826
Colusa	2,375	54.74%	1,666	38.40%	193	4.45%	43	0.99%	62	1.43%	0	0.00%	4,339
Contra Costa	148,581	58.17%	89,405	35.01%	9,270	3.63%	4,580	1.79%	3,568	1.40%	1	0.00%	255,405
Del Norte	3,911	59.44%	1,982	30.12%	355	5.40%	155	2.36%	177	2.69%	0	0.00%	6,580
El Dorado	23,633	51.75%	18,091	39.62%	2,229	4.88%	838	1.84%	873	1.91%	0	0.00%	45,664
Fresno	85,359	59.44%	50,806	35.38%	3,192	2.22%	1,852	1.29%	2,394	1.67%	10	0.01%	143,613
Glenn	3,267	53.50%	2,114	34.62%	411	2.86%	116	1.90%	199	3.26%	0	0.00%	6,107
Humboldt	29,996	63.44%	12,420	26.27%	2,134	4.51%	1,764	3.73%	971	2.05%	0	0.00%	47,285
Imperial	9,762	56.17%	6,216	35.77%	568	3.27%	415	2.39%	417	2.40%	0	0.00%	17,378
Inyo	3,408	48.22%	3,179	44.98%	279	3.95%	119	1.68%	83	1.17%	0	0.00%	7,068
Kern	60,902	51.91%	48,194	41.08%	4,039	3.44%	1,767	1.51%	2,418	2.06%	0	0.00%	117,320
Kings	10,203	61.36%	5,380	32.36%	501	3.01%	292	1.76%	252	1.52%	0	0.00%	16,628
Lake	10,252	59.57%	5,409	31.43%	833	4.84%	374	2.17%	343	1.99%	0	0.00%	17,211
Lassen	4,565	56.46%	2,634	32.57%	528	6.53%	160	1.98%	259	3.20%	0	0.00%	8,086
Los Angeles	1,074,443	59.35%	629,726	34.79%	50,476	2.79%	31,859	1.76%	23,704	1.31%	22	0.00%	1,810,230
Madera	10,726	56.81%	6,824	36.15%	687	3.64%	286	1.51%	356	1.89%	0	0.00%	18,879
Marin	57,197	62.10%	27,636	30.00%	3,630	3.94%	2,547	2.77%	1,097	1.19%	0	0.00%	92,107
Mariposa	3,502	55.94%	2,165	34.58%	292	4.66%	119	1.90%	182	2.91%	0	0.00%	6,260
Mendocino	15,758	57.02%	7,819	28.29%	1,659	6.00%	1,744	6.31%	657	2.38%	0	0.00%	27,637
Merced	18,714	60.49%	9,933	32.11%	1,253	4.05%	527	1.70%	509	1.65%	0	0.00%	30,936
Modoc	1,740	49.50%	1,309	37.24%	256	7.28%	89	2.53%	121	3.44%	0	0.00%	3,515
Mono	1,460	49.81%	1,216	41.49%	127	4.33%	64	2.18%	64	2.18%	0	0.00%	2,931
Monterey	48,649	61.82%	23,916	30.39%	3,157	4.01%	1,619	2.06%	1,349	1.71%	1	0.00%	78,691
Napa	21,865	57.02%	13,300	34.68%	1,571	4.10%	806	2.10%	804	2.10%	0	0.00%	38,346
Nevada	16,365	49.45%	13,729	41.48%	1,681	5.08%	683	2.06%	639	1.93%	0	0.00%	33,097
Orange	266,561	42.17%	321,453	50.86%	23,406	3.70%	10,859	1.72%	9,807	1.55%	2	0.00%	632,088
Placer	31,837	51.38%	24,748	39.94%	3,243	5.23%	1,067	1.72%	1,069	1.73%	0	0.00%	61,964
Plumas	4,569	58.03%	2,632	33.43%	397	5.04%	146	1.85%	129	1.64%	0	0.00%	7,873
Riverside	131,563	49.72%	115,904	43.80%	8,361	3.16%	3,894	1.47%	4,888	1.85%	1	0.00%	264,611
Sacramento	184,912	56.48%	118,524	36.20%	13,309	4.06%	5,839	1.78%	4,828	1.47%	1	0.00%	327,412
San Benito	4,953	58.35%	2,724	32.09%	466	5.49%	189	2.22%	156	1.84%	0	0.00%	8,488
San Bernardino	147,142	49.75%	126,057	42.62%	11,084	3.75%	5,320	1.80%	6,159	2.08%	4	0.00%	295,766
San Diego	308,775	47.68%	272,897	42.14%	32,732	5.05%	15,849	2.45%	17,308	2.67%	2	0.00%	647,563
San Francisco	156,031	73.91%	42,910	20.32%	4,854	2.30%	5,026	2.38%	2,301	1.09%	0	0.00%	211,122
San Joaquin	65,961	60.27%	36,515	33.37%	3,989	3.65%	1,414	1.29%	1,555	1.42%	0	0.00%	109,434
San Luis Obispo	38,379	55.21%	25,834	37.16%	2,765	3.98%	1,446	2.08%	1,089	1.57%	0	0.00%	69,513
San Mateo	107,889	59.61%	59,152	32.68%	7,212	3.98%	3,647	2.01%	3,094	1.71%	1	0.00%	180,995
Santa Barbara	59,555	56.12%	39,682	37.40%	3,474	3.27%	2,055	1.94%	1,344	1.27%	2	0.00%	106,112
Santa Clara	236,776	58.85%	131,304	32.63%	17,439	4.33%	8,930	2.22%	7,906	1.96%	1	0.00%	402,356
Santa Cruz	48,261	67.41%	20,552	28.71%	3,610	5.04%	2,993	4.18%	1,461	2.04%	1	0.00%	71,591
Shasta	24,701	51.43%	19,248	40.07%	2,184	4.55%	741	1.54%	1,156	2.41%	0	0.00%	48,030
Sierra	893	58.10%	489	31.82%	105	6.83%	21	1.37%	29	1.89%	0	0.00%	1,537
Siskiyou	7,879	52.29%	5,352	35.52%	1,042	6.92%	335	2.22%	460	3.05%	0	0.00%	15,068
Solano	50,999	60.57%	25,135	29.85%	4,047	4.81%	2,173	2.58%	1,848	2.19%	0	0.00%	84,202
Sonoma	80,088	59.43%	40,213	29.84%	6,506	4.83%	5,144	3.82%	2,797	2.08%	1	0.00%	134,749
Stanislaus	52,927	62.68%	25,910	30.68%	3,103	3.67%	1,171	1.39%	1,329	1.57%	0	0.00%	84,440
Sutter	9,082	48.90%	8,248	44.41%	692	3.73%	242	1.30%	307	1.65%	0	0.00%	18,571
Tehama	8,757	55.10%	5,247	33.01%	1,169	7.36%	278	1.75%	442	2.78%	0	0.00%	15,893
Trinity	2,846	52.54%	1,815	33.51%	447	8.25%	155	2.86%	154	2.84%	0	0.00%	5,417
Tulare	37,178	57.82%	23,865	37.12%	1,432	2.23%	845	1.31%	975	1.52%	0	0.00%	64,295
Tuolumne	11,293	58.86%	5,937	30.94%	1,283	6.69%	300	1.56%	373	1.94%	0	0.00%	19,186
Ventura	88,455	49.97%	75,279	42.52%	7,187	4.06%	3,351	1.89%	2,756	1.56%	1	0.00%	177,029
Yolo	26,264	63.17%	12,165	29.26%	1,612	3.88%	1,026	2.47%	509	1.22%	0	0.00%	41,576
Yuba	6,491	54.53%	4,416	37.10%	504	4.23%	197	1.65%	296	2.49%	0	0.00%	11,904
Totals	4,153,534	56.12%	2,700,696	36.49%	273,524	3.70%	147,606	1.99%	125,867	1.70%	58	0.00%	7,401,285
