= Kathleen Brown =

American politician (born 1945)

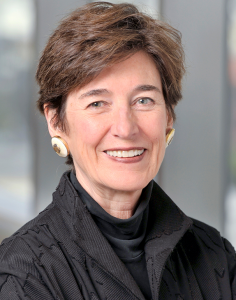

29th Treasurer of California
- In office January 7, 1991 – January 2, 1995
- Governor: Pete Wilson
- Preceded by: Thomas Hayes
- Succeeded by: Matt Fong

Personal details
- Born: Kathleen Lynn Brown; September 25, 1945 (age 79); San Francisco, California, U.S.
- Political party: Democratic
- Spouse(s): George Rice (divorced); Van Gordon Sauter
- Children: 3
- Relatives: Pat Brown (father); Bernice Layne Brown (mother); Jerry Brown (brother)
- Education: Stanford University (BA); Fordham University (JD)

Kathleen Lynn Brown (born September 25, 1945) is an American attorney and politician who served as the 29th treasurer of California from 1991 to 1995. Brown unsuccessfully ran for governor of California in the 1994 election.

== Early life and education ==
Brown was born in San Francisco, the youngest of four children of former California Governor Pat Brown (1959–1967). She is the youngest sister of twice-California Governor Jerry Brown (1975–1983, 2011–2019). Brown is a graduate of Stanford University and Fordham University School of Law.

== Political career ==
Brown was elected to the Los Angeles City Board of Education in 1975, then re-elected in 1979. She was a member of the Los Angeles Board of Public Works from 1987 to 1989.

=== California State Treasurer ===
Brown successfully ran for treasurer of California in 1990. After defeating Compton city treasurer Wesley Sanders in the Democratic primary, Brown faced Republican incumbent Thomas W. Hayes in the general election. Hayes, who had been appointed to the office a year prior, ran an advertisement asking voters if they “Remember Jerry Brown?” to tie her to her brother's unpopularity.

During the campaign, Brown described herself as the "financial Brown", and held a large financial advantage versus Hayes. Brown's strength among female voters and the electorate in Northern California ultimately powered her victory.

=== 1994 gubernatorial election ===
In 1994, Brown ran for governor of California against Republican incumbent Pete Wilson. Her candidacy made her the third member of her family, after her father and brother, to run for the office. Running on the slogan "America's Best Treasurer to Revive America's Worst Economy", Brown's campaign focused on economic issues facing the state. Her campaign's senior advisor was Steve Glazer, who was later elected to the California State Senate.

In the spring of 1994, Brown appeared favored in the contest, with a Field Poll taken in April 1994 showing her with a 51 to 39 percent lead over the incumbent. By fall, however, polls had tightened considerably, which was partially credited to California's economic condition improving by election day.

Brown ultimately lost to Wilson, with the Los Angeles Times concluding that she "changed issues too often and ran out of money". Despite speculation that she would run for Governor again in 1998, she did not enter the race.

== Post-political career ==
Brown is a partner in law firm Manatt, Phelps & Phillips. Prior to joining Manatt, she was head of public finance for the Midwest region for Goldman Sachs, after taking positions as president of private banking for Bank of America 1995–2000, and as head of public sector and infrastructure investment for Goldman Sachs from 2001 to 2010. Staying in California for public sector banking would have likely posed a potential conflict of interest.

Brown is a member of the board of directors for Sempra Energy, owners of Southern California Gas Company responsible for the Aliso Canyon gas leak.

== Personal life ==
She had three children with her first husband, George Rice, then divorced him. Then, she married Van Gordon Sauter, at one time President of CBS News, and they have five grown children. Her dog, named Sutter, was given to Jerry Brown, and became California's First Dog in 2011.

Party political offices
Preceded by Jesse Unruh	Democratic nominee for Treasurer of California; 1990	Succeeded by Phil Angelides
Preceded by Dianne Feinstein	Democratic nominee for Governor of California; 1994	Succeeded by Gray Davis
Political offices
Preceded by Thomas Hayes	Treasurer of California; 1991–1995	Succeeded by Matt Fong
