= Political party strength in California =

Politics in the US state of California

California was a former Republican leaning state until the 1990s, but since then has become a stronghold of the Democratic and considered to be one of the "Big Three" Democratic strongholds alongside New York and Illinois. Originally a swing state following statehood, California began regularly supporting Republicans for the first half of the 20th century. Republican dominance waned with demographic change, accelerating with increased immigration beginning in the 1980s. The party remained competitive with Democratic candidates until 1992. This changed amidst a struggling economy, when California flipped from Republican to elect Democrat Bill Clinton as President. Republicans still won statewide contests in the state until the late 2000s, with Arnold Schwarzenegger elected governor.

== Party affiliation ==
=== Current ===
Party registration as of May 18, 2026
Party	Number of voters	Fraction
Democratic	10,397,692	44.90%
Republican	5,779,786	24.96%
No Party Affiliation	5,284,968	22.82%
American Independent	965,068	4.17%
Libertarian	231,107	1.00%
Peace and Freedom	154,305	0.67%
Green	113,790	0.49%
Others	228,731	1.00%
Total	23,155,447	100.0%

=== Historically ===
Political party registration by year (Note: Data taken from the February of each year)
Year	DEM	REP	AIP	GRE	LP	NLP	PFP	RP	Others	Independent	Total
2026	10,382,269	5,784,486	959,354	113,205	231,356	–	152,497	–	229,879	5,259,808	23,112,854
2025	10,367,321	5,776,356	896,260	110,649	233,052	–	141,785	–	258,490	5,116,983	22,900,896
2024	10,285,108	5,388,479	834,730	102,659	240,618	–	138,238	–	264,954	4,822,547	22,077,333
2023	10,305,901	5,236,952	793,272	97,253	234,743	–	125,196	–	246,137	4,941,314	21,980,768
2022	10,275,371	5,271,141	731,426	89,997	219,512	–	113,278	–	264,890	5,039,628	22,005,243
2021	10,228,144	5,347,377	680,573	85,828	204,345	–	105,535	–	244,279	5,258,223	22,154,304
2020	9,361,582	4,937,986	600,057	83,281	175,352	–	95,242	–	225,174	5,181,791	20,660,465
2019	8,612,368	4,709,851	517,872	88,771	153,348	–	76,784	–	173,790	5,645,665	19,978,449
2018	8,405,464	4,763,967	502,304	90,459	139,620	–	73,962	–	143,735	4,735,318	18,854,829
2017	8,700,440	5,027,714	510,486	94,720	141,461	–	76,021	–	119,555	4,762,212	19,432,609
2016	7,438,655	4,767,259	472,019	102,688	120,578	–	75,579	–	140,775	4,141,860	17,259,413
2015	7,645,173	4,958,225	480,124	109,836	121,876	–	78,295	–	148,764	4,175,643	17,717,936
2014	7,678,424	5,041,564	472,536	109,157	114,656	–	77,594	–	444,020	3,718,931	17,660,486
2013	7,932,373	5,225,675	476,157	112,973	109,636	–	61,612	–	367,483	3,766,457	18,055,783
2012	7,429,684	5,170,592	428,560	111,319	93,300	–	59,012	–	115,192	3,617,466	17,028,290
2011	7,569,581	5,307,411	417,567	113,118	92,246	–	58,470	–	121,019	3,507,119	17,186,531
2010	7,545,617	5,199,961	382,380	111,395	84,462	–	55,036	–	118,194	3,412,529	16,909,574
2009	7,716,790	5,397,434	376,849	116,048	83,786	–	56,116	–	121,907	3,465,345	17,334,275
2008	6,749,406	5,229,425	328,261	127,042	80,435	–	57,182	–	97,838	3,043,164	15,712,753
2007	6,667,437	5,362,473	313,461	138,861	83,420	–	58,264	–	105,028	2,953,414	15,682,358
2006	6,747,602	5,483,104	310,987	145,786	83,465	23,645	59,193	–	82,394	2,874,236	15,810,412
2005	7,156,449	5,734,536	330,082	157,565	89,328	28,571	67,238	–	91,587	2,973,317	16,628,673
2004	6,518,631	5,364,832	291,055	157,749	86,053	30,597	70,475	–	91,729	2,480,039	15,091,160
2003	6,733,858	5,341,974	295,060	156,803	89,356	42,656	–	–	184,117	2,324,439	15,168,263
2002	6,867,529	5,332,482	308,009	144,396	91,986	50,059	–	74,050	132,504	2,237,532	15,232,154
2001	7,099,243	5,414,933	317,382	141,637	93,360	54,013	–	74,050	134,527	2,248,541	15,577,686
2000	6,684,668	5,140,951	295,387	108,904	87,183	62,183	–	85,869	133,997	2,032,663	14,631,805
1999	6,939,917	5,238,394	291,922	98,350	82,339	64,068	–	–	223,691	1,914,440	14,853,121

1999 California Voter Registration by County

2001 California Voter Registration by County

2003 California Voter Registration by County

2005 California Voter Registration by County

2007 California Voter Registration by County

2009 California Voter Registration by County

2011 California Voter Registration by County

2013 California Voter Registration by County

2015 California Voter Registration by County

2017 California Voter Registration by County

2019 California Voter Registration by County

2021 California Voter Registration by County

2023 California Voter Registration by County

2024 California Voter Registration by County

2025 California Voter Registration by County

== Electoral history ==
The following table indicates the party of elected officials in California:

- Governor
- Lieutenant Governor
- Attorney General
- Secretary of State
- Treasurer
- Controller
- Insurance Commissioner
- California Superintendent of Public Instruction

The table also indicates the historical party composition in the:

- Board of Equalization
- State Senate
- State Assembly
- State delegation to the U.S. Senate
- State delegation to the U.S. House of Representatives

For years in which a presidential election was held, the table indicates which party's nominees received the state's electoral votes.

Note that ties on the Board of Equalization are broken by the vote of the State Controller.

=== 1849–1990 ===
Year	Executive offices							BOE	State Legislature		United States Congress			Electoral votes
Year	Governor	Lieutenant Governor	Attorney General	Secretary of State	Treasurer	Controller	Supt. of Pub. Inst.	BOE	State Senate	State Assem.	U.S. Senator (Class I)	U.S. Senator (Class III)	U.S. House	Electoral votes
1849	Peter Hardeman; Burnett (D)	John McDougal (D)	Edward J. C. Kewen (D)	William Van Voohies (D)	Richard Roman (D)	John S. Houston (D)		no such office	16NP	36NP				
1850	Peter Hardeman; Burnett (D)	John McDougal (D)	Edward J. C. Kewen (D)	William Van Voohies (D)	Richard Roman (D)	John S. Houston (D)		no such office	16NP	36NP	John C. Frémont (D)	William M. Gwin (D)	1D, 1I	
1851	John McDougal (D)	David C. Broderick (D)	James A. McDougall (D)	William Van Voohies (D)	Richard Roman (D)	John S. Houston (D)	John Gage Marvin (D)	no such office	10D, 4W, 2I	18W, 17D, 1I (Note: A Democrat, John Bigler, was re-elected Speaker, continuing in his service from when it was a non-partisan body.)	vacant	William M. Gwin (D)	1D, 1I	
1852	John Bigler (D)	Samuel Purdy (D)	Serranus Clinton Hastings (D)	William Van Voohies (D)	Richard Roman (D)	Winslow S. Pierce (D)	John Gage Marvin (D)	no such office	26D, 2W	41D, 21W, 1I	John B. Weller (D)	William M. Gwin (D)	2D	Pierce/ King (D) ✓
1853	John Bigler (D)	Samuel Purdy (D)	Serranus Clinton Hastings (D)	James W. Denver (D)	Richard Roman (D)	Winslow S. Pierce (D)	John Gage Marvin (D)	no such office	20D, 7W	41D, 22W	John B. Weller (D)	William M. Gwin (D)	2D	Pierce/ King (D) ✓
1854	John Bigler (D)	Samuel Purdy (D)	John R. McConnell (D)	James W. Denver (D)	Selden A. McMeans (D)	Samuel Bell (D)	Paul K. Hubbs (D)	no such office	26D, 8W	68D, 12W	John B. Weller (D)	William M. Gwin (D)	2D	Pierce/ King (D) ✓
1855	John Bigler (D)	Samuel Purdy (D)	John R. McConnell (D)	Charles R. Hempstead (D)	Selden A. McMeans (D)	Samuel Bell (D)	Paul K. Hubbs (D)	no such office	26D, 7W	42D, 36W, 2I	John B. Weller (D)	vacant	2D	Pierce/ King (D) ✓
1856	J. Neely Johnson (KN)	Robert M. Anderson (KN)	William T. Wallace (KN)	David F. Douglass (KN)	Henry Bates (KN)	George W. Whitman (KN)	Paul K. Hubbs (D)	no such office	16KN, 16D, 1W (Note: The Whig voted with the Know-Nothings to elect a Know-Nothing President Pro Tempore, Delos R. Ashley.)	56KN, 23D, 1I	John B. Weller (D)	vacant	2D	Buchanan/ Breckinridge (D) ✓
1857	J. Neely Johnson (KN)	Robert M. Anderson (KN)	William T. Wallace (KN)	David F. Douglass (KN)	James L. English (KN)	Edward F. Burton (KN)	Andrew J. Moulder (D)	no such office	19D, 11KN, 3R	61D, 11R, 8KN	David C. Broderick (D) (Note: Died in office.)	William M. Gwin (D)	2D	Buchanan/ Breckinridge (D) ✓
1858	John B. Weller (D)	Joseph Walkup (D)	Thomas H. Williams (D)	Ferris Foreman (D)	Thomas Findley (D)	Aaron R. Melony (D)	Andrew J. Moulder (D)	no such office	27D, 5R, 3KN	66D, 9R, 4KN, 1I	David C. Broderick (D)	William M. Gwin (D)	2D	Buchanan/ Breckinridge (D) ✓
1859	John B. Weller (D)	Joseph Walkup (D)	Thomas H. Williams (D)	Ferris Foreman (D)	Thomas Findley (D)	Aaron R. Melony (D)	Andrew J. Moulder (D)	no such office	30D, 4R, 1I	72D, 8R	David C. Broderick (D)	William M. Gwin (D)	2D	Buchanan/ Breckinridge (D) ✓
1860	Milton Latham (D)	John G. Downey (D)	Thomas H. Williams (D)	Johnson Price (D)	Thomas Findley (D)	Samuel H. Brooks (D)	Andrew J. Moulder (D)	no such office	33D, 2R	78D, 2R	Henry P. Haun (D)	William M. Gwin (D)	2D	Lincoln/ Hamlin (R) ✓
1860	John G. Downey (D)	Isaac N. Quinn (D)	Thomas H. Williams (D)	Johnson Price (D)	Thomas Findley (D)	Samuel H. Brooks (D)	Andrew J. Moulder (D)	no such office	33D, 2R	78D, 2R	Milton Latham (D)	William M. Gwin (D)	2D	Lincoln/ Hamlin (R) ✓
1861	John G. Downey (D)	Pablo de la Guerra (D)	Thomas H. Williams (D)	Johnson Price (D)	Thomas Findley (D)	James S. Gillan (D)	Andrew J. Moulder (D)	no such office	30D, 6R	60D, 19R, 1CU	Milton Latham (D)	James A. McDougall (D)	3R	Lincoln/ Hamlin (R) ✓
1862	Leland Stanford (R)	John F. Chellis (R)	Frank M. Pixley (R)	William H. Weeks (R)	Delos R. Ashley (R)	Gilbert R. Warren (R)	Andrew J. Moulder (D)	no such office	23D, 17R	41D, 39R	Milton Latham (D)	James A. McDougall (D)	3R	Lincoln/ Hamlin (R) ✓
1863	Leland Stanford (R)	John F. Chellis (R)	John L. McCullogh (R)	Benjamin B. Redding (R)	Romualdo Pacheco (NU)	George R. Oultan (R)	John Swett (NU)	no such office	31R, 9D	63R, 17D	John Conness (R)	James A. McDougall (D)	3R	Lincoln/ Hamlin (R) ✓
1864	Frederick Low (R)	Tim N. Machin (R)	John L. McCullogh (R)	Benjamin B. Redding (R)	Romualdo Pacheco (NU)	George R. Oultan (R)	John Swett (NU)	no such office	35R, 5D	70R, 10D	John Conness (R)	James A. McDougall (D)	3R	Lincoln/ Johnson (NU) ✓
1865	Frederick Low (R)	Tim N. Machin (R)	John L. McCullogh (R)	Benjamin B. Redding (R)	Romualdo Pacheco (NU)	George R. Oultan (R)	John Swett (NU)	no such office	35R, 5D	70R, 10D	John Conness (R)	James A. McDougall (D)	3R	Lincoln/ Johnson (NU) ✓
1866	Frederick Low (R)	Tim N. Machin (R)	John L. McCullogh (R)	Benjamin B. Redding (R)	Romualdo Pacheco (NU)	George R. Oultan (R)	John Swett (NU)	no such office	31R, 9D	61R, 19D	John Conness (R)	James A. McDougall (D)	3R	Lincoln/ Johnson (NU) ✓
1867	Frederick Low (R)	Tim N. Machin (R)	Jo Hamilton (D)	Henry L. Nichols (D)	Antonio F. Coronel (D)	Robert Watt (D)	Oscar Penn Fitzgerald (D)	no such office	31R, 9D	61R, 19D	John Conness (R)	Cornelius Cole (R)	2D, 1R	Lincoln/ Johnson (NU) ✓
1868	Henry Huntly Haight (D)	William Holden (D)	Jo Hamilton (D)	Henry L. Nichols (D)	Antonio F. Coronel (D)	Robert Watt (D)	Oscar Penn Fitzgerald (D)	no such office	21R, 19D	52D, 28R	John Conness (R)	Cornelius Cole (R)	2D, 1R	Grant/ Colfax (R) ✓
1869	Henry Huntly Haight (D)	William Holden (D)	Jo Hamilton (D)	Henry L. Nichols (D)	Antonio F. Coronel (D)	Robert Watt (D)	Oscar Penn Fitzgerald (D)	no such office	21R, 19D	52D, 28R	Eugene Casserly (D)	Cornelius Cole (R)	2D, 1R	Grant/ Colfax (R) ✓
1870	Henry Huntly Haight (D)	William Holden (D)	Jo Hamilton (D)	Henry L. Nichols (D)	Antonio F. Coronel (D)	Robert Watt (D)	Oscar Penn Fitzgerald (D)	no such office	26D, 12R, 2I	67D, 10R, 3I	Eugene Casserly (D)	Cornelius Cole (R)	2D, 1R	Grant/ Colfax (R) ✓
1871	Henry Huntly Haight (D)	William Holden (D)	John Lord Love (R)	Drury Melone (R)	Ferdinand Baehr (R)	James J. Green (R)	Henry Nicholas Bolander (R)	no such office	26D, 12R, 2I	67D, 10R, 3I	Eugene Casserly (D)	Cornelius Cole (R)	3R	Grant/ Colfax (R) ✓
1872	Newton Booth (R)	Romualdo Pacheco (R)	John Lord Love (R)	Drury Melone (R)	Ferdinand Baehr (R)	James J. Green (R)	Henry Nicholas Bolander (R)	no such office	22D, 17R, 1I	54R, 25D, 1I	Eugene Casserly (D)	Cornelius Cole (R)	3R	Grant/ Wilson (R) ✓
1873	Newton Booth (R)	Romualdo Pacheco (R)	John Lord Love (R)	Drury Melone (R)	Ferdinand Baehr (R)	James J. Green (R)	Henry Nicholas Bolander (R)	no such office	22D, 17R, 1I	54R, 25D, 1I	Eugene Casserly (D)	Aaron A. Sargent (R)	3R, 1D	Grant/ Wilson (R) ✓
1874	Newton Booth (R)	Romualdo Pacheco (R)	John Lord Love (R)	Drury Melone (R)	Ferdinand Baehr (R)	James J. Green (R)	Henry Nicholas Bolander (R)	no such office	18R, 14D, 8PI (Note: A Democrat, William Irwin, was elected President Pro Tempore with the support of the People's Independent Party.)	34PI, 27R, 19D (Note: A representative of the People's Independent Party, Morris M. Estee, was elected Speaker with the support of the Democrats.)	John S. Hager (D)	Aaron A. Sargent (R)	3R, 1D	Grant/ Wilson (R) ✓
1875	Romualdo Pacheco (R)	William Irwin (D)	Jo Hamilton (D)	Thomas Bock (D)	José Guadalupe Estudillo (D)	James W. Mandeville (D)	Ezra S. Carr (R)	no such office	18R, 14D, 8PI	34PI, 27R, 19D	Newton Booth (AM)	Aaron A. Sargent (R)	3D, 1R	Grant/ Wilson (R) ✓
1876	William Irwin (D)	James A. Johnson (D)	Jo Hamilton (D)	Thomas Bock (D)	José Guadalupe Estudillo (D)	William B. C. Brown (D)	Ezra S. Carr (R)	no such office	20D, 11I, 6R, 3ID	64D, 12R, 4I	Newton Booth (AM)	Aaron A. Sargent (R)	3D, 1R	Hayes/ Wheeler (R) ✓
1877	William Irwin (D)	James A. Johnson (D)	Jo Hamilton (D)	Thomas Bock (D)	José Guadalupe Estudillo (D)	Daniel M. Kenfield (R)	Ezra S. Carr (R)	no such office	20D, 11I, 6R, 3ID	64D, 12R, 4I	Newton Booth (AM)	Aaron A. Sargent (R)	3R, 1D	Hayes/ Wheeler (R) ✓
1878	William Irwin (D)	James A. Johnson (D)	Jo Hamilton (D)	Thomas Bock (D)	José Guadalupe Estudillo (D)	Daniel M. Kenfield (R)	Ezra S. Carr (R)	no such office	27D, 10R, 2I, 1WPC	55D, 24R, 1WPC	Newton Booth (AM)	Aaron A. Sargent (R)	2D, 2R	Hayes/ Wheeler (R) ✓
1879	William Irwin (D)	James A. Johnson (D)	Jo Hamilton (D)	Thomas Bock (D)	José Guadalupe Estudillo (D)	Daniel M. Kenfield (R)	Ezra S. Carr (R)	3R, 1D	27D, 10R, 2I, 1WPC	55D, 24R, 1WPC	Newton Booth (AM)	James T. Farley (D)	3R, 1D	Hayes/ Wheeler (R) ✓
1880	George C. Perkins (R)	John Mansfield (R)	Augustus L. Hart (R)	Daniel M. Burns (R)	John Weil (R)	Daniel M. Kenfield (R)	Frederick M. Campbell (R)	3R, 1D	23R, 10WPC, 7D	46R, 18D, 16WPC	Newton Booth (AM)	James T. Farley (D)	3R, 1D	Hancock/ English (D) ✗
1881	George C. Perkins (R)	John Mansfield (R)	Augustus L. Hart (R)	Daniel M. Burns (R)	John Weil (R)	Daniel M. Kenfield (R)	Frederick M. Campbell (R)	3R, 1D	23R, 10WPC, 7D	42R, 33D, 4WPC, 1GB	John Franklin Miller (R)	James T. Farley (D)	2D, 2R	Hancock/ English (D) ✗
1882	George C. Perkins (R)	John Mansfield (R)	Augustus L. Hart (R)	Daniel M. Burns (R)	John Weil (R)	Daniel M. Kenfield (R)	Frederick M. Campbell (R)	3R, 1D	23R, 10WPC, 7D	42R, 33D, 4WPC, 1GB	John Franklin Miller (R)	James T. Farley (D)	2D, 2R	Hancock/ English (D) ✗
1883	George Stoneman (D)	John Daggett (D)	Edward C. Marshall (D)	Thomas Larkin Thompson (D)	William A. January (D)	John P. Dunn (D)	William T. Weckler (D)	3D, 1R	32D, 8R	61D, 19R	John Franklin Miller (R)	James T. Farley (D)	6D	Hancock/ English (D) ✗
1884	George Stoneman (D)	John Daggett (D)	Edward C. Marshall (D)	Thomas Larkin Thompson (D)	Denis J. Oullahan (D)	John P. Dunn (D)	William T. Weckler (D)	3D, 1R	32D, 8R	61D, 19R	John Franklin Miller (R)	James T. Farley (D)	6D	Blaine/ Logan (R) ✗
1885	George Stoneman (D)	John Daggett (D)	Edward C. Marshall (D)	Thomas Larkin Thompson (D)	Denis J. Oullahan (D)	John P. Dunn (D)	William T. Weckler (D)	3D, 1R	20D, 20R (Note: The senate elected a Democratic President Pro Tempore.)	60R, 20D	John Franklin Miller (R)	Leland Stanford (R)	5R, 1D	Blaine/ Logan (R) ✗
1886	George Stoneman (D)	John Daggett (D)	Edward C. Marshall (D)	Thomas Larkin Thompson (D)	Denis J. Oullahan (D)	John P. Dunn (D)	William T. Weckler (D)	3D, 1R	20D, 20R	60R, 20D	George Hearst (D) (Note: Appointed to fill vacancy.)	Leland Stanford (R)	5R, 1D	Blaine/ Logan (R) ✗
1886	George Stoneman (D)	John Daggett (D)	Edward C. Marshall (D)	Thomas Larkin Thompson (D)	Denis J. Oullahan (D)	John P. Dunn (D)	William T. Weckler (D)	3D, 1R	20D, 20R	60R, 20D	Abram Williams (R)	Leland Stanford (R)	5R, 1D	Blaine/ Logan (R) ✗
1887	Washington Bartlett (D)	Robert Waterman (R)	George A. Johnson (D)	William C. Hendricks (D)	Adam Herald (D)	John P. Dunn (D)	Ira G. Haitt (R)	3D, 1R	22D, 18R	41R, 39D	George Hearst (D)	Leland Stanford (R)	4R, 2D	Blaine/ Logan (R) ✗
1888	Robert Waterman (R)	Stephen M. White (D)	George A. Johnson (D)	William C. Hendricks (D)	Adam Herald (D)	John P. Dunn (D)	Ira G. Haitt (R)	3D, 1R	22D, 18R	41R, 39D	George Hearst (D)	Leland Stanford (R)	4R, 2D	Harrison/ Morton (R) ✓
1889	Robert Waterman (R)	Stephen M. White (D)	George A. Johnson (D)	William C. Hendricks (D)	Adam Herald (D)	John P. Dunn (D)	Ira G. Haitt (R)	3D, 1R	22D, 18R	42D, 38R	George Hearst (D)	Leland Stanford (R)	4R, 2D	Harrison/ Morton (R) ✓
1890	Robert Waterman (R)	Stephen M. White (D)	George A. Johnson (D)	William C. Hendricks (D)	Adam Herald (D)	John P. Dunn (D)	Ira G. Haitt (R)	3D, 1R	22D, 18R	42D, 38R	George Hearst (D)	Leland Stanford (R)	4R, 2D	Harrison/ Morton (R) ✓
1891	Henry Markham (R)	John B. Reddick (R)	William H. Hart (R)	Edwin G. Waite (R)	J.R. McDonald (R)	Edward P. Colgan (R)	J. W. Anderson (R)	3R, 1D	28R, 12D	60R 19D, 1KN	Charles N. Felton (R)	Leland Stanford (R)	4R, 2D	Harrison/ Morton (R) ✓
1892	Henry Markham (R)	John B. Reddick (R)	William H. Hart (R)	Edwin G. Waite (R)	J.R. McDonald (R)	Edward P. Colgan (R)	J. W. Anderson (R)	3R, 1D	28R, 12D	60R 19D, 1KN	Charles N. Felton (R)	Leland Stanford (R)	4R, 2D	8 - Cleveland/ Stevenson (D) ✓ 1 - Harrison/ Reid (R) ✗
1893	Henry Markham (R)	John B. Reddick (R)	William H. Hart (R)	Edwin G. Waite (R)	J.R. McDonald (R)	Edward P. Colgan (R)	J. W. Anderson (R)	3R, 1D	22R, 18D	45D, 31R, 2I, 2Pop	Stephen M. White (D)	Leland Stanford (R)	4R, 2D	8 - Cleveland/ Stevenson (D) ✓ 1 - Harrison/ Reid (R) ✗
1894	Henry Markham (R)	John B. Reddick (R)	William H. Hart (R)	Albert Hart (R)	J.R. McDonald (R)	Edward P. Colgan (R)	J. W. Anderson (R)	3R, 1D	22R, 18D	45D, 31R, 2I, 2Pop	Stephen M. White (D)	George C. Perkins (R)	4R, 2D	8 - Cleveland/ Stevenson (D) ✓ 1 - Harrison/ Reid (R) ✗
1895	James Budd (D)	Spencer G. Millard (R)	William F. Fitzgerald (R)	Lewis H. Brown (R)	Levi Ratcliffe (R)	Edward P. Colgan (R)	Samuel T. Black (R)	3R, 1D	25R, 15D	64R, 14D, 2Pop	Stephen M. White (D)	George C. Perkins (R)	4R, 2D	8 - Cleveland/ Stevenson (D) ✓ 1 - Harrison/ Reid (R) ✗
1896	James Budd (D)	William T. Jeter (D)	William F. Fitzgerald (R)	Lewis H. Brown (R)	Levi Ratcliffe (R)	Edward P. Colgan (R)	Samuel T. Black (R)	3R, 1D	25R, 15D	64R, 14D, 2Pop	Stephen M. White (D)	George C. Perkins (R)	4R, 2D	McKinley/ Roosevelt (R) ✓
1897	James Budd (D)	William T. Jeter (D)	William F. Fitzgerald (R)	Lewis H. Brown (R)	Levi Ratcliffe (R)	Edward P. Colgan (R)	Samuel T. Black (R)	3R, 1D	28R, 12D	47R, 16Fus, 9Pop, 8D	Stephen M. White (D)	George C. Perkins (R)	3R, 2D, 2Pop	McKinley/ Roosevelt (R) ✓
1898	James Budd (D)	William T. Jeter (D)	William F. Fitzgerald (R)	Lewis H. Brown (R)	Will S. Green (D)	Edward P. Colgan (R)	Charles T. Meredith (D)	3R, 1D	28R, 12D	47R, 16Fus, 9Pop, 8D	Stephen M. White (D)	George C. Perkins (R)	3R, 2D, 2Pop	McKinley/ Roosevelt (R) ✓
1899	Henry T. Gage (R)	Jacob H. Neff (R)	Tirey L. Ford (R)	Charles F. Curry (R)	Truman Reeves (R)	Edward P. Colgan (R)	Thomas J. Kirk (R)	2R, 2D (Note: Republicans held the State Controller's office for the duration of this tie and cast the tie-breaking vote here, giving control of the Board to the Republicans.)	26R, 14D	59R, 20D, 2I	vacant	George C. Perkins (R)	6R, 1D	McKinley/ Roosevelt (R) ✓
1900	Henry T. Gage (R)	Jacob H. Neff (R)	Tirey L. Ford (R)	Charles F. Curry (R)	Truman Reeves (R)	Edward P. Colgan (R)	Thomas J. Kirk (R)	2R, 2D	26R, 14D	59R, 20D, 2I	Thomas R. Bard (R)	George C. Perkins (R)	7R	McKinley/ Roosevelt (R) ✓
1901	Henry T. Gage (R)	Jacob H. Neff (R)	Tirey L. Ford (R)	Charles F. Curry (R)	Truman Reeves (R)	Edward P. Colgan (R)	Thomas J. Kirk (R)	2R, 2D	34R, 6D	60R, 20D	Thomas R. Bard (R)	George C. Perkins (R)	7R	McKinley/ Roosevelt (R) ✓
1902	Henry T. Gage (R)	Jacob H. Neff (R)	Tirey L. Ford (R)	Charles F. Curry (R)	Truman Reeves (R)	Edward P. Colgan (R)	Thomas J. Kirk (R)	2R, 2D	34R, 6D	60R, 20D	Thomas R. Bard (R)	George C. Perkins (R)	7R	McKinley/ Roosevelt (R) ✓
1903	George Pardee (R)	Alden Anderson (R)	Ulysses S. Webb (R)	Charles F. Curry (R)	Truman Reeves (R)	Edward P. Colgan (R)	Thomas J. Kirk (R)	2R, 2D	33R, 7D	60R, 19D, 1UL	Thomas R. Bard (R)	George C. Perkins (R)	5R, 3D	McKinley/ Roosevelt (R) ✓
1904	George Pardee (R)	Alden Anderson (R)	Ulysses S. Webb (R)	Charles F. Curry (R)	Truman Reeves (R)	Edward P. Colgan (R)	Thomas J. Kirk (R)	2R, 2D	33R, 7D	60R, 19D, 1UL	Thomas R. Bard (R)	George C. Perkins (R)	5R, 3D	Roosevelt/ Fairbanks (R) ✓
1905	George Pardee (R)	Alden Anderson (R)	Ulysses S. Webb (R)	Charles F. Curry (R)	Truman Reeves (R)	Edward P. Colgan (R)	Thomas J. Kirk (R)	2R, 2D	33R, 4UL, 3D	72R, 4D, 4UL	Frank Flint (R)	George C. Perkins (R)	8R	Roosevelt/ Fairbanks (R) ✓
1906	George Pardee (R)	Alden Anderson (R)	Ulysses S. Webb (R)	Charles F. Curry (R)	Truman Reeves (R)	A. B. Nye (R)	Thomas J. Kirk (R)	2R, 2D	33R, 4UL, 3D	72R, 4D, 4UL	Frank Flint (R)	George C. Perkins (R)	8R	Roosevelt/ Fairbanks (R) ✓
1907	James Gillett (R)	Warren R. Porter (R)	Ulysses S. Webb (R)	Charles F. Curry (R)	William R. Williams (R)	A. B. Nye (R)	Edward Hyatt (R)	4R	33R, 6D, 1I	73R, 6D, 1I	Frank Flint (R)	George C. Perkins (R)	8R	Roosevelt/ Fairbanks (R) ✓
1908	James Gillett (R)	Warren R. Porter (R)	Ulysses S. Webb (R)	Charles F. Curry (R)	William R. Williams (R)	A. B. Nye (R)	Edward Hyatt (R)	4R	33R, 6D, 1I	73R, 6D, 1I	Frank Flint (R)	George C. Perkins (R)	8R	Taft/ Sherman (R) ✓
1909	James Gillett (R)	Warren R. Porter (R)	Ulysses S. Webb (R)	Charles F. Curry (R)	William R. Williams (R)	A. B. Nye (R)	Edward Hyatt (R)	4R	30R, 9D, 1I	60R, 20D	Frank Flint (R)	George C. Perkins (R)	8R	Taft/ Sherman (R) ✓
1910	James Gillett (R)	Warren R. Porter (R)	Ulysses S. Webb (R)	Charles F. Curry (R)	William R. Williams (R)	A. B. Nye (R)	Edward Hyatt (R)	4R	30R, 9D, 1I	60R, 20D	Frank Flint (R)	George C. Perkins (R)	8R	Taft/ Sherman (R) ✓
1911	Hiram Johnson (R)	Albert Joseph Wallace (R)	Ulysses S. Webb (R)	Frank C. Jordan (R)	Edward D. Roberts (R)	A. B. Nye (R)	Edward Hyatt (R)	4R	32R, 18D	69R, 11D	John D. Works (R)	George C. Perkins (R)	7R, 1D	Taft/ Sherman (R) ✓
1912	Hiram Johnson (Prog)	Albert Joseph Wallace (R)	Ulysses S. Webb (R)	Frank C. Jordan (R)	Edward D. Roberts (R)	A. B. Nye (R)	Edward Hyatt (R)	4R	32R, 18D	69R, 11D	John D. Works (R)	George C. Perkins (R)	7R, 1D	Roosevelt/ Johnson (Prog) ✗
1913	Hiram Johnson (Prog)	Albert Joseph Wallace (R)	Ulysses S. Webb (R)	Frank C. Jordan (R)	Edward D. Roberts (R)	John S. Chambers (R)	Edward Hyatt (R)	4R	30R, 10D	54R, 25D, 1Soc	John D. Works (R)	George C. Perkins (R)	7R, 3D, 1I	Roosevelt/ Johnson (Prog) ✗
1914	Hiram Johnson (Prog)	Albert Joseph Wallace (R)	Ulysses S. Webb (R)	Frank C. Jordan (R)	Edward D. Roberts (R)	John S. Chambers (R)	Edward Hyatt (R)	4R	30R, 10D	54R, 25D, 1Soc	John D. Works (R)	George C. Perkins (R)	7R, 3D, 1I	Roosevelt/ Johnson (Prog) ✗
1915	Hiram Johnson (Prog)	John Morton Eshleman (Prog)	Ulysses S. Webb (R)	Frank C. Jordan (R)	Friend Richardson (Prog)	John S. Chambers (R)	Edward Hyatt (R)	3R, 1D	21R, 10D, 9Prog	33R, 28Prog, 15D, 3Soc, 1Proh (Note: A Progressive Speaker was elected with Democratic support.)	John D. Works (R)	James D. Phelan (D)	4R, 3D, 2Prog, 1I, 1Proh	Roosevelt/ Johnson (Prog) ✗
1916	Hiram Johnson (Prog)	William Stephens (R)	Ulysses S. Webb (R)	Frank C. Jordan (R)	Friend Richardson (Prog)	John S. Chambers (R)	Edward Hyatt (R)	3R, 1D	21R, 10D, 9Prog	33R, 28Prog, 15D, 3Soc, 1Proh	John D. Works (R)	James D. Phelan (D)	5R, 3D, 1Prog, 1I, 1Proh	Wilson/ Marshall (D) ✓
1917	William Stephens (R)	C. C. Young (R)	Ulysses S. Webb (R)	Frank C. Jordan (R)	Friend Richardson (Prog)	John S. Chambers (R)	Edward Hyatt (R)	3R, 1D	20R, 11D, 8P, 1I	69R, 9D, 1Prog, 1Proh	Hiram Johnson (R)	James D. Phelan (D)	5R, 4D, 1Prog, 1Proh	Wilson/ Marshall (D) ✓
1918	William Stephens (R)	C. C. Young (R)	Ulysses S. Webb (R)	Frank C. Jordan (R)	Friend Richardson (Prog)	John S. Chambers (R)	Edward Hyatt (R)	3R, 1D	20R, 11D, 8P, 1I	69R, 9D, 1Prog, 1Proh	Hiram Johnson (R)	James D. Phelan (D)	5R, 4D, 1Prog, 1Proh	Wilson/ Marshall (D) ✓
1919	William Stephens (R)	C. C. Young (R)	Ulysses S. Webb (R)	Frank C. Jordan (R)	Friend Richardson (Prog)	John S. Chambers (R)	Will C. Wood (NP)	3R, 1D	32R, 7D, 1I	70R, 10D	Hiram Johnson (R)	James D. Phelan (D)	9R, 2D	Wilson/ Marshall (D) ✓
1920	William Stephens (R)	C. C. Young (R)	Ulysses S. Webb (R)	Frank C. Jordan (R)	Friend Richardson (Prog)	John S. Chambers (R)	Will C. Wood (NP)	3R, 1D	32R, 7D, 1I	70R, 10D	Hiram Johnson (R)	James D. Phelan (D)	9R, 2D	Harding/ Coolidge (R) ✓
1921	William Stephens (R)	C. C. Young (R)	Ulysses S. Webb (R)	Frank C. Jordan (R)	Friend Richardson (Prog)	Roy C. Riley (R)	Will C. Wood (NP)	3R, 1D	33R, 7D	73R, 7D	Hiram Johnson (R)	Samuel M. Shortridge (R)	9R, 2D	Harding/ Coolidge (R) ✓
1922	William Stephens (R)	C. C. Young (R)	Ulysses S. Webb (R)	Frank C. Jordan (R)	Friend Richardson (Prog)	Roy C. Riley (R)	Will C. Wood (NP)	3R, 1D	33R, 7D	73R, 7D	Hiram Johnson (R)	Samuel M. Shortridge (R)	9R, 2D	Harding/ Coolidge (R) ✓
1923	Friend Richardson (R)	C. C. Young (R)	Ulysses S. Webb (R)	Frank C. Jordan (R)	Charles G. Johnson (R)	Roy C. Riley (R)	Will C. Wood (NP)	3R, 1D	36R, 3D, 1I	76R, 4D	Hiram Johnson (R)	Samuel M. Shortridge (R)	9R, 2D	Harding/ Coolidge (R) ✓
1924	Friend Richardson (R)	C. C. Young (R)	Ulysses S. Webb (R)	Frank C. Jordan (R)	Charles G. Johnson (R)	Roy C. Riley (R)	Will C. Wood (NP)	3R, 1D	36R, 3D, 1I	76R, 4D	Hiram Johnson (R)	Samuel M. Shortridge (R)	9R, 2D	Coolidge/ Dawes (R) ✓
1925	Friend Richardson (R)	C. C. Young (R)	Ulysses S. Webb (R)	Frank C. Jordan (R)	Charles G. Johnson (R)	Roy C. Riley (R)	Will C. Wood (NP)	3R, 1D	37R, 3D	75R, 5D	Hiram Johnson (R)	Samuel M. Shortridge (R)	9R, 2D	Coolidge/ Dawes (R) ✓
1926	Friend Richardson (R)	C. C. Young (R)	Ulysses S. Webb (R)	Frank C. Jordan (R)	Charles G. Johnson (R)	Roy C. Riley (R)	Will C. Wood (NP)	3R, 1D	37R, 3D	75R, 5D	Hiram Johnson (R)	Samuel M. Shortridge (R)	9R, 2D	Coolidge/ Dawes (R) ✓
1927	C. C. Young (R)	Buron Fitts (R)	Ulysses S. Webb (R)	Frank C. Jordan (R)	Charles G. Johnson (R)	Roy C. Riley (R)	William John Cooper (NP/R)	4R	35R, 5D	74R, 6D	Hiram Johnson (R)	Samuel M. Shortridge (R)	10R, 1D	Coolidge/ Dawes (R) ✓
1928	C. C. Young (R)	Buron Fitts (R)	Ulysses S. Webb (R)	Frank C. Jordan (R)	Charles G. Johnson (R)	Roy C. Riley (R)	William John Cooper (NP/R)	4R	35R, 5D	74R, 6D	Hiram Johnson (R)	Samuel M. Shortridge (R)	10R, 1D	Hoover/ Curtis (R) ✓
1929	C. C. Young (R)	Herschel L. Carnahan (R)	Ulysses S. Webb (R)	Frank C. Jordan (R)	Charles G. Johnson (R)	Roy C. Riley (R)	Vierling C. Kersey (NP)	4R	35R, 5D	71R, 7D, 2I	Hiram Johnson (R)	Samuel M. Shortridge (R)	10R, 1D	Hoover/ Curtis (R) ✓
1930	C. C. Young (R)	Herschel L. Carnahan (R)	Ulysses S. Webb (R)	Frank C. Jordan (R)	Charles G. Johnson (R)	Roy C. Riley (R)	Vierling C. Kersey (NP)	4R	35R, 5D	71R, 7D, 2I	Hiram Johnson (R)	Samuel M. Shortridge (R)	10R, 1D	Hoover/ Curtis (R) ✓
1931	James Rolph (R)	Frank Merriam (R)	Ulysses S. Webb (R)	Frank C. Jordan (R)	Charles G. Johnson (R)	Roy C. Riley (R)	Vierling C. Kersey (NP)	4R	36R, 4D	73R, 7D	Hiram Johnson (R)	Samuel M. Shortridge (R)	10R, 1D	Hoover/ Curtis (R) ✓
1932	James Rolph (R)	Frank Merriam (R)	Ulysses S. Webb (R)	Frank C. Jordan (R)	Charles G. Johnson (R)	Roy C. Riley (R)	Vierling C. Kersey (NP)	4R	36R, 4D	73R, 7D	Hiram Johnson (R)	Samuel M. Shortridge (R)	10R, 1D	Roosevelt/ Garner (D) ✓
1933	James Rolph (R)	Frank Merriam (R)	Ulysses S. Webb (R)	Frank C. Jordan (R)	Charles G. Johnson (R)	Roy C. Riley (R)	Vierling C. Kersey (NP)	4R	35R, 5D	55R, 25D	Hiram Johnson (R)	William Gibbs McAdoo (D) (Note: Resigned November 8, 1938. Thomas M. Storke (D) was appointed to replace McAdoo on November 9, but as Congress was not in session Storke never took any legislative action or cast any votes during his time as Senator.)	11D, 9R	Roosevelt/ Garner (D) ✓
1934	Frank Merriam (R)	vacant	Ulysses S. Webb (R)	Frank C. Jordan (R)	Charles G. Johnson (R)	Roy C. Riley (R)	Vierling C. Kersey (NP)	4R	35R, 5D	55R, 25D	Hiram Johnson (R)	William Gibbs McAdoo (D)	11D, 9R	Roosevelt/ Garner (D) ✓
1935	Frank Merriam (R)	George J. Hatfield (R)	Ulysses S. Webb (R)	Frank C. Jordan (R)	Charles G. Johnson (R)	Roy C. Riley (R)	Vierling C. Kersey (NP)	4R	31R, 8D, 1I	42R, 37D, 1I	Hiram Johnson (R)	William Gibbs McAdoo (D)	13D, 7R	Roosevelt/ Garner (D) ✓
1936	Frank Merriam (R)	George J. Hatfield (R)	Ulysses S. Webb (R)	Frank C. Jordan (R)	Charles G. Johnson (R)	Roy C. Riley (R)	Vierling C. Kersey (NP)	4R	31R, 8D, 1I	42R, 37D, 1I	Hiram Johnson (R)	William Gibbs McAdoo (D)	13D, 7R	Roosevelt/ Garner (D) ✓
1937	Frank Merriam (R)	George J. Hatfield (R)	Ulysses S. Webb (R)	Frank C. Jordan (R)	Charles G. Johnson (R)	Harry B. Riley (R)	Walter F. Dexter (NP/R)	4R	25R, 15D	47D, 33R	Hiram Johnson (R)	William Gibbs McAdoo (D)	15D, 4R, 1Prog	Roosevelt/ Garner (D) ✓
1938	Frank Merriam (R)	George J. Hatfield (R)	Ulysses S. Webb (R)	Frank C. Jordan (R)	Charles G. Johnson (R)	Harry B. Riley (R)	Walter F. Dexter (NP/R)	4R	25R, 15D	47D, 33R	Hiram Johnson (R)	William Gibbs McAdoo (D)	15D, 4R, 1Prog	Roosevelt/ Garner (D) ✓
1939	Culbert Olson (D)	Ellis E. Patterson (D)	Earl Warren (R)	Frank C. Jordan (R)	Charles G. Johnson (R)	Harry B. Riley (R)	Walter F. Dexter (NP/R)	3R, 1D	21R, 19D	44D, 36R	Hiram Johnson (R)	Sheridan Downey (D)	11D, 8R, 1Prog	Roosevelt/ Garner (D) ✓
1940	Culbert Olson (D)	Ellis E. Patterson (D)	Earl Warren (R)	Paul Peek (D)	Charles G. Johnson (R)	Harry B. Riley (R)	Walter F. Dexter (NP/R)	3R, 1D	21R, 19D	44D, 36R	Hiram Johnson (R)	Sheridan Downey (D)	11D, 8R, 1Prog	Roosevelt/ Wallace (D) ✓
1941	Culbert Olson (D)	Ellis E. Patterson (D)	Earl Warren (R)	Paul Peek (D)	Charles G. Johnson (R)	Harry B. Riley (R)	Walter F. Dexter (NP/R)	3R, 1D	24R, 16D	42D, 38R	Hiram Johnson (R)	Sheridan Downey (D)	10D, 10R	Roosevelt/ Wallace (D) ✓
1942	Culbert Olson (D)	Ellis E. Patterson (D)	Earl Warren (R)	Paul Peek (D)	Charles G. Johnson (R)	Harry B. Riley (R)	Walter F. Dexter (NP/R)	3R, 1D	24R, 16D	42D, 38R	Hiram Johnson (R)	Sheridan Downey (D)	10D, 10R	Roosevelt/ Wallace (D) ✓
1943	Earl Warren (R)	Frederick F. Houser (R)	Robert W. Kenny (D)	Frank M. Jordan (R)	Charles G. Johnson (R)	Harry B. Riley (R)	Walter F. Dexter (NP/R)	3R, 1D	24R, 16D	44R, 36D	Hiram Johnson (R)	Sheridan Downey (D)	13D, 10R	Roosevelt/ Wallace (D) ✓
1944	Earl Warren (R)	Frederick F. Houser (R)	Robert W. Kenny (D)	Frank M. Jordan (R)	Charles G. Johnson (R)	Harry B. Riley (R)	Walter F. Dexter (NP/R)	3R, 1D	24R, 16D	44R, 36D	Hiram Johnson (R)	Sheridan Downey (D)	13D, 10R	Roosevelt/ Truman (D) ✓
1945	Earl Warren (R)	Frederick F. Houser (R)	Robert W. Kenny (D)	Frank M. Jordan (R)	Charles G. Johnson (R)	Harry B. Riley (R)	Roy E. Simpson (NP)	3R, 1D	24R, 20D	42R, 37D, 1I	Hiram Johnson (R)	Sheridan Downey (D)	16D, 7R	Roosevelt/ Truman (D) ✓
1946	Earl Warren (R)	Frederick F. Houser (R)	Robert W. Kenny (D)	Frank M. Jordan (R)	Charles G. Johnson (R)	Harry B. Riley (R)	Roy E. Simpson (NP)	3R, 1D	24R, 20D	42R, 37D, 1I	William Knowland (R)	Sheridan Downey (D)	16D, 7R	Roosevelt/ Truman (D) ✓
1947	Earl Warren (R)	Goodwin Knight (R)	Frederick N. Howser (R)	Frank M. Jordan (R)	Charles G. Johnson (R)	Thomas Kuchel (R)	Roy E. Simpson (NP)	3R, 1D	24R, 20D	48R, 32D	William Knowland (R)	Sheridan Downey (D)	14R, 9D	Roosevelt/ Truman (D) ✓
1948	Earl Warren (R)	Goodwin Knight (R)	Frederick N. Howser (R)	Frank M. Jordan (R)	Charles G. Johnson (R)	Thomas Kuchel (R)	Roy E. Simpson (NP)	3R, 1D	24R, 20D	48R, 32D	William Knowland (R)	Sheridan Downey (D)	14R, 9D	Truman/ Barkley (D) ✓
1949	Earl Warren (R)	Goodwin Knight (R)	Frederick N. Howser (R)	Frank M. Jordan (R)	Charles G. Johnson (R)	Thomas Kuchel (R)	Roy E. Simpson (NP)	3R, 1D	26R, 14D	45R, 35D	William Knowland (R)	Sheridan Downey (D)	12R, 11D	Truman/ Barkley (D) ✓
1950	Earl Warren (R)	Goodwin Knight (R)	Frederick N. Howser (R)	Frank M. Jordan (R)	Charles G. Johnson (R)	Thomas Kuchel (R)	Roy E. Simpson (NP)	3R, 1D	26R, 14D	45R, 35D	William Knowland (R)	Sheridan Downey (D)	12R, 11D	Truman/ Barkley (D) ✓
1951	Earl Warren (R)	Goodwin Knight (R)	Pat Brown (D)	Frank M. Jordan (R)	Charles G. Johnson (R)	Thomas Kuchel (R)	Roy E. Simpson (NP)	3R, 1D	28R, 12D	47R, 33D	William Knowland (R)	Richard Nixon (R)	12R, 11D	Truman/ Barkley (D) ✓
1952	Earl Warren (R)	Goodwin Knight (R)	Pat Brown (D)	Frank M. Jordan (R)	Charles G. Johnson (R)	Thomas Kuchel (R)	Roy E. Simpson (NP)	3R, 1D	28R, 12D	47R, 33D	William Knowland (R)	Richard Nixon (R)	12R, 11D	Eisenhower/ Nixon (R) ✓
1953	Earl Warren (R)	Goodwin Knight (R)	Pat Brown (D)	Frank M. Jordan (R)	Charles G. Johnson (R)	Robert C. Kirkwood (R)	Roy E. Simpson (NP)	3R, 1D	29R, 11D	53R, 27D	William Knowland (R)	Thomas Kuchel (R)	19R, 11D	Eisenhower/ Nixon (R) ✓
1954	Goodwin Knight (R)	Harold J. Powers (R)	Pat Brown (D)	Frank M. Jordan (R)	Charles G. Johnson (R)	Robert C. Kirkwood (R)	Roy E. Simpson (NP)	2R, 2D	29R, 11D	53R, 27D	William Knowland (R)	Thomas Kuchel (R)	19R, 11D	Eisenhower/ Nixon (R) ✓
1955	Goodwin Knight (R)	Harold J. Powers (R)	Pat Brown (D)	Frank M. Jordan (R)	Charles G. Johnson (R)	Robert C. Kirkwood (R)	Roy E. Simpson (NP)	2R, 2D	22R, 18D	47R, 23D	William Knowland (R)	Thomas Kuchel (R)	19R, 11D	Eisenhower/ Nixon (R) ✓
1956	Goodwin Knight (R)	Harold J. Powers (R)	Pat Brown (D)	Frank M. Jordan (R)	Charles G. Johnson (R)	Robert C. Kirkwood (R)	Roy E. Simpson (NP)	2R, 2D	22R, 18D	47R, 23D	William Knowland (R)	Thomas Kuchel (R)	19R, 11D	Eisenhower/ Nixon (R) ✓
1957	Goodwin Knight (R)	Harold J. Powers (R)	Pat Brown (D)	Frank M. Jordan (R)	A. Ronald Burton (R)	Robert C. Kirkwood (R)	Roy E. Simpson (NP)	2R, 2D	20D, 20R (Note: A Democrat, Hugh M. Burns was elected Senate President Pro Tempore.)	42R, 38D	William Knowland (R)	Thomas Kuchel (R)	17R, 13D	Eisenhower/ Nixon (R) ✓
1958	Goodwin Knight (R)	Harold J. Powers (R)	Pat Brown (D)	Frank M. Jordan (R)	A. Ronald Burton (R)	Robert C. Kirkwood (R)	Roy E. Simpson (NP)	2R, 2D	20D, 20R	42R, 38D	William Knowland (R)	Thomas Kuchel (R)	17R, 13D	Eisenhower/ Nixon (R) ✓
1959	Pat Brown (D)	Glenn M. Anderson (D)	Stanley Mosk (D)	Frank M. Jordan (R)	Bert A. Betts (D)	Alan Cranston (D)	Roy E. Simpson (NP)	4D	26D, 14R	47D, 33R	Clair Engle (D)	Thomas Kuchel (R)	16D, 14R	Eisenhower/ Nixon (R) ✓
1960	Pat Brown (D)	Glenn M. Anderson (D)	Stanley Mosk (D)	Frank M. Jordan (R)	Bert A. Betts (D)	Alan Cranston (D)	Roy E. Simpson (NP)	4D	26D, 14R	47D, 33R	Clair Engle (D)	Thomas Kuchel (R)	16D, 14R	Nixon/ Lodge (R) ✗
1961	Pat Brown (D)	Glenn M. Anderson (D)	Stanley Mosk (D)	Frank M. Jordan (R)	Bert A. Betts (D)	Alan Cranston (D)	Roy E. Simpson (NP)	4D	30D, 10R	47D, 33R	Clair Engle (D)	Thomas Kuchel (R)	24D, 14R	Nixon/ Lodge (R) ✗
1962	Pat Brown (D)	Glenn M. Anderson (D)	Stanley Mosk (D)	Frank M. Jordan (R)	Bert A. Betts (D)	Alan Cranston (D)	Roy E. Simpson (NP)	4D	30D, 10R	47D, 33R	Clair Engle (D)	Thomas Kuchel (R)	24D, 14R	Nixon/ Lodge (R) ✗
1963	Pat Brown (D)	Glenn M. Anderson (D)	Stanley Mosk (D)	Frank M. Jordan (R)	Bert A. Betts (D)	Alan Cranston (D)	Max Rafferty (NP/R)	4D	27D, 13R	52D, 28R	Clair Engle (D)	Thomas Kuchel (R)	23D, 15R	Nixon/ Lodge (R) ✗
1964	Pat Brown (D)	Glenn M. Anderson (D)	Stanley Mosk (D)	Frank M. Jordan (R)	Bert A. Betts (D)	Alan Cranston (D)	Max Rafferty (NP/R)	4D	27D, 13R	52D, 28R	Clair Engle (D)	Thomas Kuchel (R)	23D, 15R	Johnson/ Humphrey (D) ✓
1964	Pat Brown (D)	Glenn M. Anderson (D)	Thomas C. Lynch (D)	Frank M. Jordan (R)	Bert A. Betts (D)	Alan Cranston (D)	Max Rafferty (NP/R)	4D	27D, 13R	52D, 28R	Pierre Salinger (D)	Thomas Kuchel (R)	23D, 15R	Johnson/ Humphrey (D) ✓
1965	Pat Brown (D)	Glenn M. Anderson (D)	Thomas C. Lynch (D)	Frank M. Jordan (R)	Bert A. Betts (D)	Alan Cranston (D)	Max Rafferty (NP/R)	4D	27D, 13R	49D, 31R	George Murphy (R)	Thomas Kuchel (R)	23D, 15R	Johnson/ Humphrey (D) ✓
1966	Pat Brown (D)	Glenn M. Anderson (D)	Thomas C. Lynch (D)	Frank M. Jordan (R)	Bert A. Betts (D)	Alan Cranston (D)	Max Rafferty (NP/R)	4D	27D, 13R	49D, 31R	George Murphy (R)	Thomas Kuchel (R)	23D, 15R	Johnson/ Humphrey (D) ✓
1967	Ronald Reagan (R)	Robert Finch (R)	Thomas C. Lynch (D)	Frank M. Jordan (R)	Ivy Baker Priest (R)	Houston Flournoy (R)	Max Rafferty (NP/R)	4D	21D, 19R (Note: A Democrat, J. Eugene McAteer died in office in May 1967 and was succeeded by a Republican Milton Marks in August 1967 shifting the Senate to 20D, 20R.)	42D, 38R	George Murphy (R)	Thomas Kuchel (R)	21D, 17R	Johnson/ Humphrey (D) ✓
1968	Ronald Reagan (R)	Robert Finch (R)	Thomas C. Lynch (D)	Frank M. Jordan (R)	Ivy Baker Priest (R)	Houston Flournoy (R)	Max Rafferty (NP/R)	4D	20D, 20R	42D, 38R	George Murphy (R)	Thomas Kuchel (R)	21D, 17R	Nixon/ Agnew (R) ✓
1969	Ronald Reagan (R)	Edwin Reinecke (R)	Thomas C. Lynch (D)	Frank M. Jordan (R)	Ivy Baker Priest (R)	Houston Flournoy (R)	Max Rafferty (NP/R)	4D	21R, 19D	41R, 39D	George Murphy (R)	Alan Cranston (D)	21D, 17R	Nixon/ Agnew (R) ✓
1970	Ronald Reagan (R)	Edwin Reinecke (R)	Thomas C. Lynch (D)	H. P. Sullivan (R)	Ivy Baker Priest (R)	Houston Flournoy (R)	Max Rafferty (NP/R)	4D	21R, 19D	41R, 39D	George Murphy (R)	Alan Cranston (D)	21D, 17R	Nixon/ Agnew (R) ✓
1971	Ronald Reagan (R)	Edwin Reinecke (R)	Evelle J. Younger (R)	Jerry Brown (D)	Ivy Baker Priest (R)	Houston Flournoy (R)	Wilson Riles (NP/D)	4D	21D, 19R	43D, 37R	John V. Tunney (D)	Alan Cranston (D)	20D, 18R	Nixon/ Agnew (R) ✓
1972	Ronald Reagan (R)	Edwin Reinecke (R)	Evelle J. Younger (R)	Jerry Brown (D)	Ivy Baker Priest (R)	Houston Flournoy (R)	Wilson Riles (NP/D)	4D	21D, 19R	43D, 37R	John V. Tunney (D)	Alan Cranston (D)	20D, 18R	Nixon/ Agnew (R) ✓
1973	Ronald Reagan (R)	Edwin Reinecke (R)	Evelle J. Younger (R)	Jerry Brown (D)	Ivy Baker Priest (R)	Houston Flournoy (R)	Wilson Riles (NP/D)	4D	20D, 20R (Note: Democrat James Mills continued as Senate President Pro Tempore.)	51D, 29R	John V. Tunney (D)	Alan Cranston (D)	23D, 20R	Nixon/ Agnew (R) ✓
1974	Ronald Reagan (R)	John L. Harmer (R)	Evelle J. Younger (R)	Jerry Brown (D)	Ivy Baker Priest (R)	Houston Flournoy (R)	Wilson Riles (NP/D)	4D	20D, 20R	51D, 29R	John V. Tunney (D)	Alan Cranston (D)	23D, 20R	Nixon/ Agnew (R) ✓
1975	Jerry Brown (D)	Mervyn Dymally (D)	Evelle J. Younger (R)	March Fong Eu (D)	Jesse M. Unruh (D)	Kenneth Cory (D)	Wilson Riles (NP/D)	4D	25D, 15R	55D, 25R	John V. Tunney (D)	Alan Cranston (D)	28D, 15R	Nixon/ Agnew (R) ✓
1976	Jerry Brown (D)	Mervyn Dymally (D)	Evelle J. Younger (R)	March Fong Eu (D)	Jesse M. Unruh (D)	Kenneth Cory (D)	Wilson Riles (NP/D)	4D	25D, 15R	55D, 25R	John V. Tunney (D)	Alan Cranston (D)	28D, 15R	Ford/ Dole (R) ✗
1977	Jerry Brown (D)	Mervyn Dymally (D)	Evelle J. Younger (R)	March Fong Eu (D)	Jesse M. Unruh (D)	Kenneth Cory (D)	Wilson Riles (NP/D)	4D	28D, 12R	57D, 23R	S. I. Hayakawa (R)	Alan Cranston (D)	29D, 14R	Ford/ Dole (R) ✗
1978	Jerry Brown (D)	Mervyn Dymally (D)	Evelle J. Younger (R)	March Fong Eu (D)	Jesse M. Unruh (D)	Kenneth Cory (D)	Wilson Riles (NP/D)	4D	28D, 12R	57D, 23R	S. I. Hayakawa (R)	Alan Cranston (D)	29D, 14R	Ford/ Dole (R) ✗
1979	Jerry Brown (D)	Mike Curb (R)	George Deukmejian (R)	March Fong Eu (D)	Jesse M. Unruh (D)	Kenneth Cory (D)	Wilson Riles (NP/D)	3D, 1R	26D, 14R	50D, 30R	S. I. Hayakawa (R)	Alan Cranston (D)	28D, 15R	Ford/ Dole (R) ✗
1980	Jerry Brown (D)	Mike Curb (R)	George Deukmejian (R)	March Fong Eu (D)	Jesse M. Unruh (D)	Kenneth Cory (D)	Wilson Riles (NP/D)	3D, 1R	26D, 14R	50D, 30R	S. I. Hayakawa (R)	Alan Cranston (D)	28D, 15R	Reagan/ Bush (R) ✓
1981	Jerry Brown (D)	Mike Curb (R)	George Deukmejian (R)	March Fong Eu (D)	Jesse M. Unruh (D)	Kenneth Cory (D)	Wilson Riles (NP/D)	3D, 1R	26D, 14R	47D, 33R	S. I. Hayakawa (R)	Alan Cranston (D)	22D, 21R	Reagan/ Bush (R) ✓
1982	Jerry Brown (D)	Mike Curb (R)	George Deukmejian (R)	March Fong Eu (D)	Jesse M. Unruh (D)	Kenneth Cory (D)	Wilson Riles (NP/D)	3D, 1R	26D, 14R	47D, 33R	S. I. Hayakawa (R)	Alan Cranston (D)	22D, 21R	Reagan/ Bush (R) ✓
1983	George Deukmejian (R)	Leo T. McCarthy (D)	John Van de Kamp (D)	March Fong Eu (D)	Jesse M. Unruh (D)	Kenneth Cory (D)	Bill Honig (NP)	3D, 1R	25D, 15R	48D, 32R	Pete Wilson (R) (Note: Resigned to take office as Governor of California.)	Alan Cranston (D)	28D, 17R	Reagan/ Bush (R) ✓
1984	George Deukmejian (R)	Leo T. McCarthy (D)	John Van de Kamp (D)	March Fong Eu (D)	Jesse M. Unruh (D)	Kenneth Cory (D)	Bill Honig (NP)	3D, 1R	25D, 15R	48D, 32R	Pete Wilson (R)	Alan Cranston (D)	28D, 17R	Reagan/ Bush (R) ✓
1985	George Deukmejian (R)	Leo T. McCarthy (D)	John Van de Kamp (D)	March Fong Eu (D)	Jesse M. Unruh (D)	Kenneth Cory (D)	Bill Honig (NP)	3D, 1R	25D, 15R	47D, 33R	Pete Wilson (R)	Alan Cranston (D)	28D, 17R	Reagan/ Bush (R) ✓
1986	George Deukmejian (R)	Leo T. McCarthy (D)	John Van de Kamp (D)	March Fong Eu (D)	Jesse M. Unruh (D)	Kenneth Cory (D)	Bill Honig (NP)	3D, 1R	25D, 15R	47D, 33R	Pete Wilson (R)	Alan Cranston (D)	28D, 17R	Reagan/ Bush (R) ✓
1987	George Deukmejian (R)	Leo T. McCarthy (D)	John Van de Kamp (D)	March Fong Eu (D)	Jesse M. Unruh (D)	Gray Davis (D)	Bill Honig (NP)	2D, 2R (Note: Democratic State Controllers held office for the entire duration of this tie, giving Democrats control of the Board.)	24D, 14R, 1I	44D, 36R	Pete Wilson (R)	Alan Cranston (D)	28D, 17R	Reagan/ Bush (R) ✓
1988	George Deukmejian (R)	Leo T. McCarthy (D)	John Van de Kamp (D)	March Fong Eu (D)	Elizabeth Whitney (D) (Note: Deputy officer who served in an acting capacity during a vacancy.)	Gray Davis (D)	Bill Honig (NP/D)	2D, 2R	24D, 14R, 1I	44D, 36R	Pete Wilson (R)	Alan Cranston (D)	28D, 17R	Bush/ Quayle (R) ✓
1989	George Deukmejian (R)	Leo T. McCarthy (D)	John Van de Kamp (D)	March Fong Eu (D)	Thomas W. Hayes (R)	Gray Davis (D)	Bill Honig (NP/D)	2D, 2R	24D, 14R, 1I	47D, 33R	Pete Wilson (R)	Alan Cranston (D)	28D, 17R	Bush/ Quayle (R) ✓
1990	George Deukmejian (R)	Leo T. McCarthy (D)	John Van de Kamp (D)	March Fong Eu (D)	Thomas W. Hayes (R)	Gray Davis (D)	Bill Honig (NP/D)	2D, 2R	24D, 14R, 1I	47D, 33R	Pete Wilson (R)	Alan Cranston (D)	28D, 17R	Bush/ Quayle (R) ✓

=== 1991–present ===
Year	Executive offices								BOE	State Legislature		United States Congress			Electoral votes
Year	Governor	Lieutenant Governor	Attorney General	Secretary of State	Treasurer	Controller	Insurance Comm.	Supt. of Pub. Inst.	BOE	State Senate	State Assem.	U.S. Senator (Class I)	U.S. Senator (Class III)	U.S. House	Electoral votes
1991	Pete Wilson (R)	Leo T. McCarthy (D)	Dan Lungren (R)	March Fong Eu (D)	Kathleen Brown (D)	Gray Davis (D)	John Garamendi (D)	Bill Honig (NP/D)	2D, 2R	25D, 14R, 1I	46D, 34R	John Seymour (R)	Alan Cranston (D)	26D, 19R	
1992	Pete Wilson (R)	Leo T. McCarthy (D)	Dan Lungren (R)	March Fong Eu (D)	Kathleen Brown (D)	Gray Davis (D)	John Garamendi (D)	Bill Honig (NP/D)	2D, 2R	25D, 14R, 1I	46D, 34R	John Seymour (R)	Alan Cranston (D)	26D, 19R	Clinton/ Gore (D) ✓
1993	Pete Wilson (R)	Leo T. McCarthy (D)	Dan Lungren (R)	March Fong Eu (D)	Kathleen Brown (D)	Gray Davis (D)	John Garamendi (D)	David Dawson (NP)	2D, 2R	23D, 15R, 2I	48D, 32R	Dianne Feinstein (D)	Barbara Boxer (D)	30D, 22R	Clinton/ Gore (D) ✓
1994	Pete Wilson (R)	Leo T. McCarthy (D)	Dan Lungren (R)	Tony Miller (D)	Kathleen Brown (D)	Gray Davis (D)	John Garamendi (D)	David Dawson (NP)	2D, 2R	23D, 15R, 2I	48D, 32R	Dianne Feinstein (D)	Barbara Boxer (D)	30D, 22R	Clinton/ Gore (D) ✓
1995	Pete Wilson (R)	Gray Davis (D)	Dan Lungren (R)	Bill Jones (R)	Matt Fong (R)	Kathleen Connell (D)	Chuck; Quackenbush (R)	Delaine Eastin (NP/D)	2D, 2R	21D, 17R, 2I	41R, 39D (Note: Democrat Willie Brown continued as Speaker for the first half of 1995 with the support of a Republican-turned-Independent, Paul Horcher, and two Republicans. Those two Republicans, Doris Allen and Brian Setencich, each served as Speaker for three months the second half of 1995. Republican Curt Pringle was then selected as Speaker in 1996 after the Independent and two Republicans were recalled and/or removed from office.)	Dianne Feinstein (D)	Barbara Boxer (D)	27D, 25R	Clinton/ Gore (D) ✓
1996	Pete Wilson (R)	Gray Davis (D)	Dan Lungren (R)	Bill Jones (R)	Matt Fong (R)	Kathleen Connell (D)	Chuck; Quackenbush (R)	Delaine Eastin (NP/D)	2D, 2R	21D, 17R, 2I	41R, 39D	Dianne Feinstein (D)	Barbara Boxer (D)	26D, 26R	Clinton/ Gore (D) ✓
1997	Pete Wilson (R)	Gray Davis (D)	Dan Lungren (R)	Bill Jones (R)	Matt Fong (R)	Kathleen Connell (D)	Chuck; Quackenbush (R)	Delaine Eastin (NP/D)	2D, 2R	23D, 16R, 1I	43D, 37R	Dianne Feinstein (D)	Barbara Boxer (D)	29D, 23R	Clinton/ Gore (D) ✓
1998	Pete Wilson (R)	Gray Davis (D)	Dan Lungren (R)	Bill Jones (R)	Matt Fong (R)	Kathleen Connell (D)	Chuck; Quackenbush (R)	Delaine Eastin (NP/D)	2D, 2R	23D, 16R, 1I	43D, 37R	Dianne Feinstein (D)	Barbara Boxer (D)	29D, 23R	Clinton/ Gore (D) ✓
1999	Gray Davis (D) (Note: Recalled in 2003.)	Cruz Bustamante (D)	Bill Lockyer (D)	Bill Jones (R)	Phil Angelides (D)	Kathleen Connell (D)	Chuck; Quackenbush (R)	Delaine Eastin (NP/D)	2D, 2R	25D, 15R	47D, 32R, 1G	Dianne Feinstein (D)	Barbara Boxer (D)	28D, 24R	Clinton/ Gore (D) ✓
2000	Gray Davis (D)	Cruz Bustamante (D)	Bill Lockyer (D)	Bill Jones (R)	Phil Angelides (D)	Kathleen Connell (D)	J. Clark Kelso (R)	Delaine Eastin (NP/D)	2D, 2R	25D, 15R	47D, 32R, 1G	Dianne Feinstein (D)	Barbara Boxer (D)	27D, 25R	Gore/ Lieberman (D) ✗
2001	Gray Davis (D)	Cruz Bustamante (D)	Bill Lockyer (D)	Bill Jones (R)	Phil Angelides (D)	Kathleen Connell (D)	Harry W. Low (D)	Delaine Eastin (NP/D)	2D, 2R	26D, 14R	50D, 30R	Dianne Feinstein (D)	Barbara Boxer (D)	32D, 20R	Gore/ Lieberman (D) ✗
2002	Gray Davis (D)	Cruz Bustamante (D)	Bill Lockyer (D)	Bill Jones (R)	Phil Angelides (D)	Kathleen Connell (D)	Harry W. Low (D)	Delaine Eastin (NP/D)	2D, 2R	26D, 14R	50D, 30R	Dianne Feinstein (D)	Barbara Boxer (D)	32D, 20R	Gore/ Lieberman (D) ✗
2003	Gray Davis (D)	Cruz Bustamante (D)	Bill Lockyer (D)	Kevin Shelley (D) (Note: Resigned March 4, 2005. Deputy Insurance Commissioner Cathy Mitchell served in an acting capacity from March 4 until March 29.)	Phil Angelides (D)	Steve Westly (D)	John Garamendi (D)	Jack O'Connell (NP/D)	2D, 2R	25D, 15R	48D, 32R	Dianne Feinstein (D)	Barbara Boxer (D)	33D, 20R	Gore/ Lieberman (D) ✗
2004	Arnold; Schwarzenegger (R)	Cruz Bustamante (D)	Bill Lockyer (D)	Kevin Shelley (D)	Phil Angelides (D)	Steve Westly (D)	John Garamendi (D)	Jack O'Connell (NP/D)	2D, 2R	25D, 15R	48D, 32R	Dianne Feinstein (D)	Barbara Boxer (D)	33D, 20R	Kerry/ Edwards (D) ✗
2005	Arnold; Schwarzenegger (R)	Cruz Bustamante (D)	Bill Lockyer (D)	Bruce McPherson (R)	Phil Angelides (D)	Steve Westly (D)	John Garamendi (D)	Jack O'Connell (NP/D)	2D, 2R	25D, 15R	48D, 32R	Dianne Feinstein (D)	Barbara Boxer (D)	33D, 20R	Kerry/ Edwards (D) ✗
2006	Arnold; Schwarzenegger (R)	Cruz Bustamante (D)	Bill Lockyer (D)	Bruce McPherson (R)	Phil Angelides (D)	Steve Westly (D)	John Garamendi (D)	Jack O'Connell (NP/D)	2D, 2R	25D, 15R	48D, 32R	Dianne Feinstein (D)	Barbara Boxer (D)	33D, 20R	Kerry/ Edwards (D) ✗
2007	Arnold; Schwarzenegger (R)	John Garamendi (D)	Jerry Brown (D)	Debra Bowen (D)	Bill Lockyer (D)	John Chiang (D)	Steve Poizner (R)	Jack O'Connell (NP/D)	2D, 2R	25D, 15R	48D, 32R	Dianne Feinstein (D)	Barbara Boxer (D)	34D, 19R	Kerry/ Edwards (D) ✗
2008	Arnold; Schwarzenegger (R)	John Garamendi (D)	Jerry Brown (D)	Debra Bowen (D)	Bill Lockyer (D)	John Chiang (D)	Steve Poizner (R)	Jack O'Connell (NP/D)	2D, 2R	25D, 15R	48D, 32R	Dianne Feinstein (D)	Barbara Boxer (D)	34D, 19R	Obama/ Biden (D) ✓
2009	Arnold; Schwarzenegger (R)	John Garamendi (D)	Jerry Brown (D)	Debra Bowen (D)	Bill Lockyer (D)	John Chiang (D)	Steve Poizner (R)	Jack O'Connell (NP/D)	2D, 2R	25D, 15R	50D, 29R, 1I	Dianne Feinstein (D)	Barbara Boxer (D)	34D, 19R	Obama/ Biden (D) ✓
2010	Arnold; Schwarzenegger (R)	Abel Maldonado (R)	Jerry Brown (D)	Debra Bowen (D)	Bill Lockyer (D)	John Chiang (D)	Steve Poizner (R)	Jack O'Connell (NP/D)	2D, 2R	25D, 15R	50D, 29R, 1I	Dianne Feinstein (D)	Barbara Boxer (D)	34D, 19R	Obama/ Biden (D) ✓
2011	Jerry Brown (D)	Gavin Newsom (D)	Kamala Harris (D)	Debra Bowen (D)	Bill Lockyer (D)	John Chiang (D)	Dave Jones (D)	Tom Torlakson (NP/D)	2D, 2R	25D, 15R	52D, 28R	Dianne Feinstein (D)	Barbara Boxer (D)	34D, 19R	Obama/ Biden (D) ✓
2012	Jerry Brown (D)	Gavin Newsom (D)	Kamala Harris (D)	Debra Bowen (D)	Bill Lockyer (D)	John Chiang (D)	Dave Jones (D)	Tom Torlakson (NP/D)	2D, 2R	25D, 15R	52D, 27R, 1I	Dianne Feinstein (D)	Barbara Boxer (D)	34D, 19R	Obama/ Biden (D) ✓
2013	Jerry Brown (D)	Gavin Newsom (D)	Kamala Harris (D)	Debra Bowen (D)	Bill Lockyer (D)	John Chiang (D)	Dave Jones (D)	Tom Torlakson (NP/D)	2D, 2R	29D, 11R	55D, 25R	Dianne Feinstein (D)	Barbara Boxer (D)	34D, 19R	Obama/ Biden (D) ✓
2014	Jerry Brown (D)	Gavin Newsom (D)	Kamala Harris (D)	Debra Bowen (D)	Bill Lockyer (D)	John Chiang (D)	Dave Jones (D)	Tom Torlakson (NP/D)	2D, 2R	28D, 12R (Note: Republican Andy Vidak won a special election to fill the seat of Democrat Michael Rubio)	55D, 25R	Dianne Feinstein (D)	Barbara Boxer (D)	34D, 19R	Obama/ Biden (D) ✓
2015	Jerry Brown (D)	Gavin Newsom (D)	Kamala Harris (D)	Alex Padilla (D)	John Chiang (D)	Betty Yee (D)	Dave Jones (D)	Tom Torlakson (NP/D)	2D, 2R	26D, 14R	52D, 28R	Dianne Feinstein (D)	Barbara Boxer (D)	38D, 15R	Obama/ Biden (D) ✓
2016	Jerry Brown (D)	Gavin Newsom (D)	Kamala Harris (D)	Alex Padilla (D)	John Chiang (D)	Betty Yee (D)	Dave Jones (D)	Tom Torlakson (NP/D)	2D, 2R	26D, 14R	52D, 28R	Dianne Feinstein (D)	Barbara Boxer (D)	38D, 15R	Clinton/ Kaine (D) ✗
2017	Jerry Brown (D)	Gavin Newsom (D)	Xavier Becerra (D)	Alex Padilla (D)	John Chiang (D)	Betty Yee (D)	Dave Jones (D)	Tom Torlakson (NP/D)	2D, 2R	27D, 13R	55D, 25R	Dianne Feinstein (D)	Kamala Harris (D) (Note: Resigned to take office as Vice President of the United States.)	39D, 14R	Clinton/ Kaine (D) ✗
2018	Jerry Brown (D)	Gavin Newsom (D)	Xavier Becerra (D)	Alex Padilla (D)	John Chiang (D)	Betty Yee (D)	Dave Jones (D)	Tom Torlakson (NP/D)	2D, 2R	26D, 14R (Note: Democratic Senator Josh Newman was recalled and replaced by Republican Ling Ling Chang.)	55D, 25R	Dianne Feinstein (D)	Kamala Harris (D)	39D, 14R	Clinton/ Kaine (D) ✗
2019	Gavin Newsom (D)	Eleni Kounalakis (D)	Xavier Becerra (D)	Alex Padilla (D)	Fiona Ma (D)	Betty Yee (D)	Ricardo Lara (D)	Tony Thurmond (NP/D)	3D, 1R	29D, 11R	60D, 20R	Dianne Feinstein (D)	Kamala Harris (D)	46D, 7R	Clinton/ Kaine (D) ✗
2019	Gavin Newsom (D)	Eleni Kounalakis (D)	Xavier Becerra (D)	Alex Padilla (D)	Fiona Ma (D)	Betty Yee (D)	Ricardo Lara (D)	Tony Thurmond (NP/D)	3D, 1R	29D, 11R	61D, 19R (Note: Republican Assemblyman Brian Maienschein switched to the Democratic Party.)	Dianne Feinstein (D)	Kamala Harris (D)	46D, 7R	Clinton/ Kaine (D) ✗
2019	Gavin Newsom (D)	Eleni Kounalakis (D)	Xavier Becerra (D)	Alex Padilla (D)	Fiona Ma (D)	Betty Yee (D)	Ricardo Lara (D)	Tony Thurmond (NP/D)	3D, 1R	29D, 11R	61D, 18R, 1I (Note: Republican Assemblyman Chad Mayes left the Republican party and registered as an independent.)	Dianne Feinstein (D)	Kamala Harris (D)	46D, 7R	Clinton/ Kaine (D) ✗
2020	Gavin Newsom (D)	Eleni Kounalakis (D)	Xavier Becerra (D)	Alex Padilla (D)	Fiona Ma (D)	Betty Yee (D)	Ricardo Lara (D)	Tony Thurmond (NP/D)	3D, 1R	29D, 11R	61D, 18R, 1I	Dianne Feinstein (D)	Kamala Harris (D)	45D, 7R (Note: Democrat Katie Hill resigned and was succeeded by Republican Mike Garcia. Republican Duncan D. Hunter resigned and his seat remained vacant until the next election.)	Biden/ Harris (D) ✓
2021	Gavin Newsom (D)	Eleni Kounalakis (D)	Rob Bonta (D)	Shirley Weber (D)	Fiona Ma (D)	Betty Yee (D)	Ricardo Lara (D)	Tony Thurmond (NP/D)	3D, 1R	31D, 9R	60D, 19R, 1I	Dianne Feinstein (D)	Alex Padilla (D)	42D, 11R	Biden/ Harris (D) ✓
2022	Gavin Newsom (D)	Eleni Kounalakis (D)	Rob Bonta (D)	Shirley Weber (D)	Fiona Ma (D)	Betty Yee (D)	Ricardo Lara (D)	Tony Thurmond (NP/D)	3D, 1R	31D, 9R	60D, 19R, 1I	Dianne Feinstein (D)	Alex Padilla (D)	42D, 11R	Biden/ Harris (D) ✓
2023	Gavin Newsom (D)	Eleni Kounalakis (D)	Rob Bonta (D)	Shirley Weber (D)	Fiona Ma (D)	Malia Cohen (D)	Ricardo Lara (D)	Tony Thurmond (NP/D)	3D, 1R	32D, 8R	62D, 18R	Laphonza Butler (D)	Alex Padilla (D)	40D, 12R	Biden/ Harris (D) ✓
2024	Gavin Newsom (D)	Eleni Kounalakis (D)	Rob Bonta (D)	Shirley Weber (D)	Fiona Ma (D)	Malia Cohen (D)	Ricardo Lara (D)	Tony Thurmond (NP/D)	3D, 1R	32D, 8R	62D, 18R	Laphonza Butler (D)	Alex Padilla (D)	40D, 12R	Harris/ Walz (D) ✗
2024	Gavin Newsom (D)	Eleni Kounalakis (D)	Rob Bonta (D)	Shirley Weber (D)	Fiona Ma (D)	Malia Cohen (D)	Ricardo Lara (D)	Tony Thurmond (NP/D)	3D, 1R	31D, 9R (Note: Democratic state senator Marie Alvarado-Gil switched to the Republican Party.)	62D, 18R	Laphonza Butler (D)	Alex Padilla (D)	40D, 12R	Harris/ Walz (D) ✗
2025	Gavin Newsom (D)	Eleni Kounalakis (D)	Rob Bonta (D)	Shirley Weber (D)	Fiona Ma (D)	Malia Cohen (D)	Ricardo Lara (D)	Tony Thurmond (NP/D)	3D, 1R	30D, 10R	60D, 20R	Adam Schiff (D)	Alex Padilla (D)	43D, 9R	Harris/ Walz (D) ✗
2026	Gavin Newsom (D)	Eleni Kounalakis (D)	Rob Bonta (D)	Shirley Weber (D)	Fiona Ma (D)	Malia Cohen (D)	Ricardo Lara (D)	Tony Thurmond (NP/D)	3D, 1R	30D, 10R	60D, 20R	Adam Schiff (D)	Alex Padilla (D)	43D, 8R, 1I (Note: U.S. Rep. Kevin Kiley switched parties from Republican to Independent on March 9, 2026.)	Harris/ Walz (D) ✗
2027	Xavier Becerra (D)	Fiona Ma (D)	Rob Bonta (D)	Shirley Weber (D)	Eleni Kounalakis (D)	Malia Cohen (D)	Jane Kim (D)	Richard Barrera (NP/D)	4D	TBC (D)	TBC (D)	Adam Schiff (D)	Alex Padilla (D)	48D, 3R	Harris/ Walz (D) ✗

Key to party colors and abbreviations for members of the U.S. Congress and other politicians or officials
Alaskan Independence (AKIP) Know Nothing (KN) American Labor (AL) Anti-Jacksonian (Anti-J); National Republican (NR) Anti-Administration (AA) Anti-Masonic (Anti-M) Conservative (Con) Covenant (Cov)	Democratic (D) Democratic–Farmer–Labor (DFL) Democratic–NPL (D-NPL) Dixiecrat (Dix), States' Rights (SR) Democratic-Republican (DR) Farmer–Labor (FL) Federalist (F); Pro-Administration (PA)	Free Soil (FS) Fusion (Fus) Greenback (GB) Independence (IPM) Jacksonian (J) Liberal (Lib) Libertarian (L) National Union (NU)	Nonpartisan League (NPL) Nullifier (N) Opposition Northern (O); Opposition Southern (O) Populist (Pop) Progressive (Prog) Prohibition (Proh) Readjuster (Rea)	Republican (R) Silver (Sv) Silver Republican (SvR) Socialist (Soc) Union (U) Unconditional Union (UU) Vermont Progressive (VP) Whig (W)	Independent (I) Nonpartisan (NP)

== See also ==
- Government and politics in California
- California locations by voter registration
- Politics of California
  - Politics of California before 1900
- Elections in California
- Government of California
