= Elizabeth Whitney =

Elizabeth Whitney may refer to:

- Elizabeth Whitney (treasurer), California state treasurer 1987-1989
- Elizabeth Ann Whitney, early Mormon leader in the Relief Society
- Elizabeth Whitney Williams, lighthouse keeper from 1872-1913
