= 1849 California lieutenant gubernatorial election =

- November 13, 1849
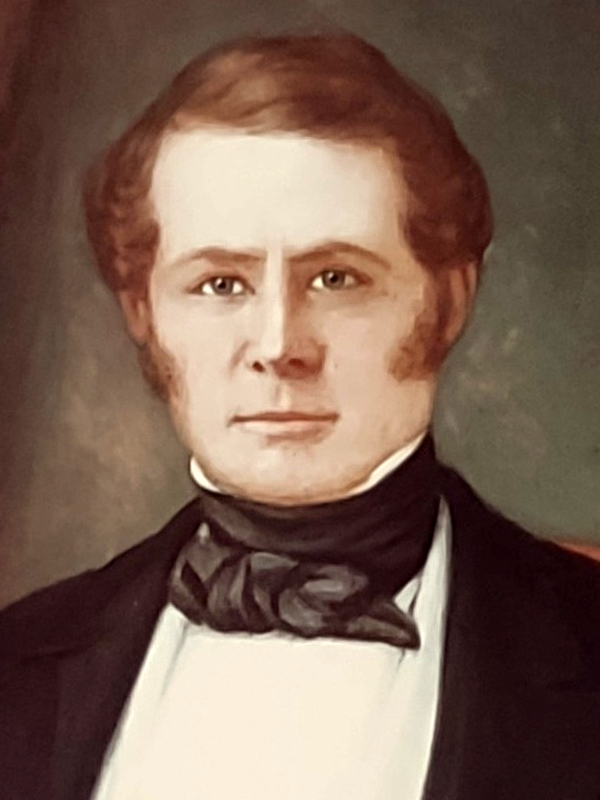

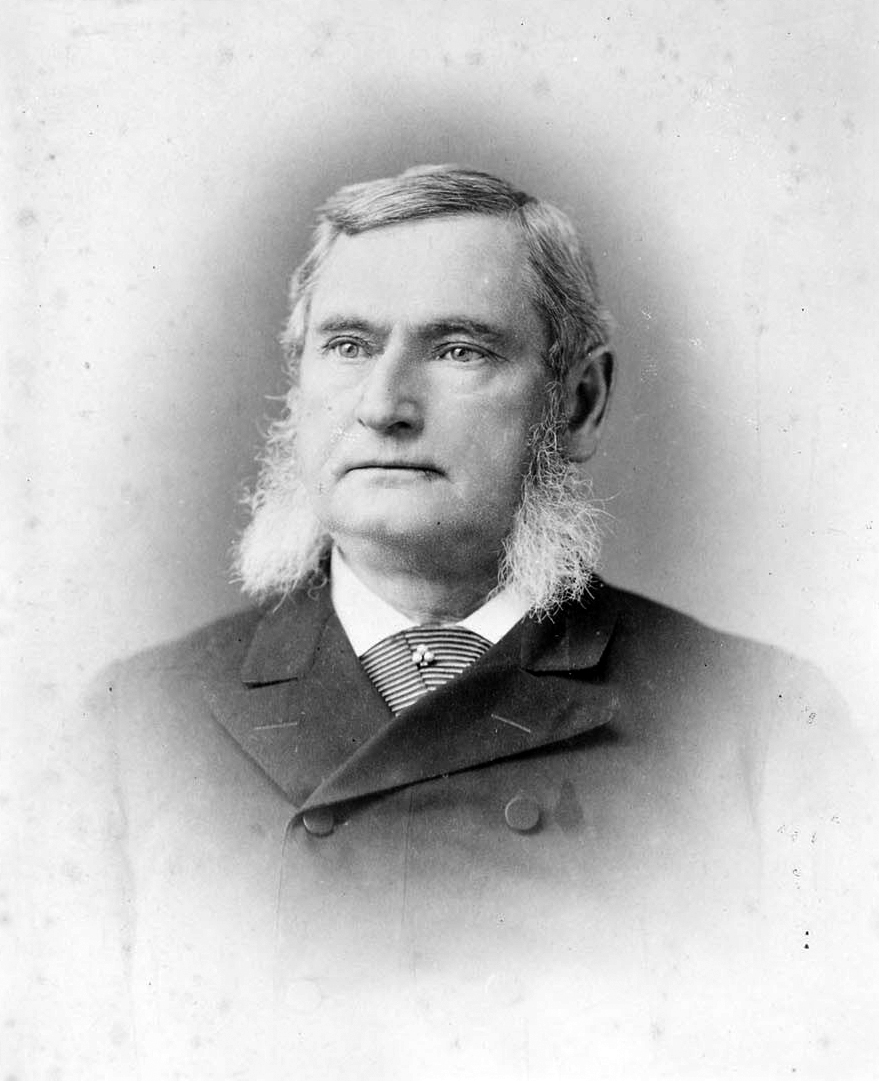

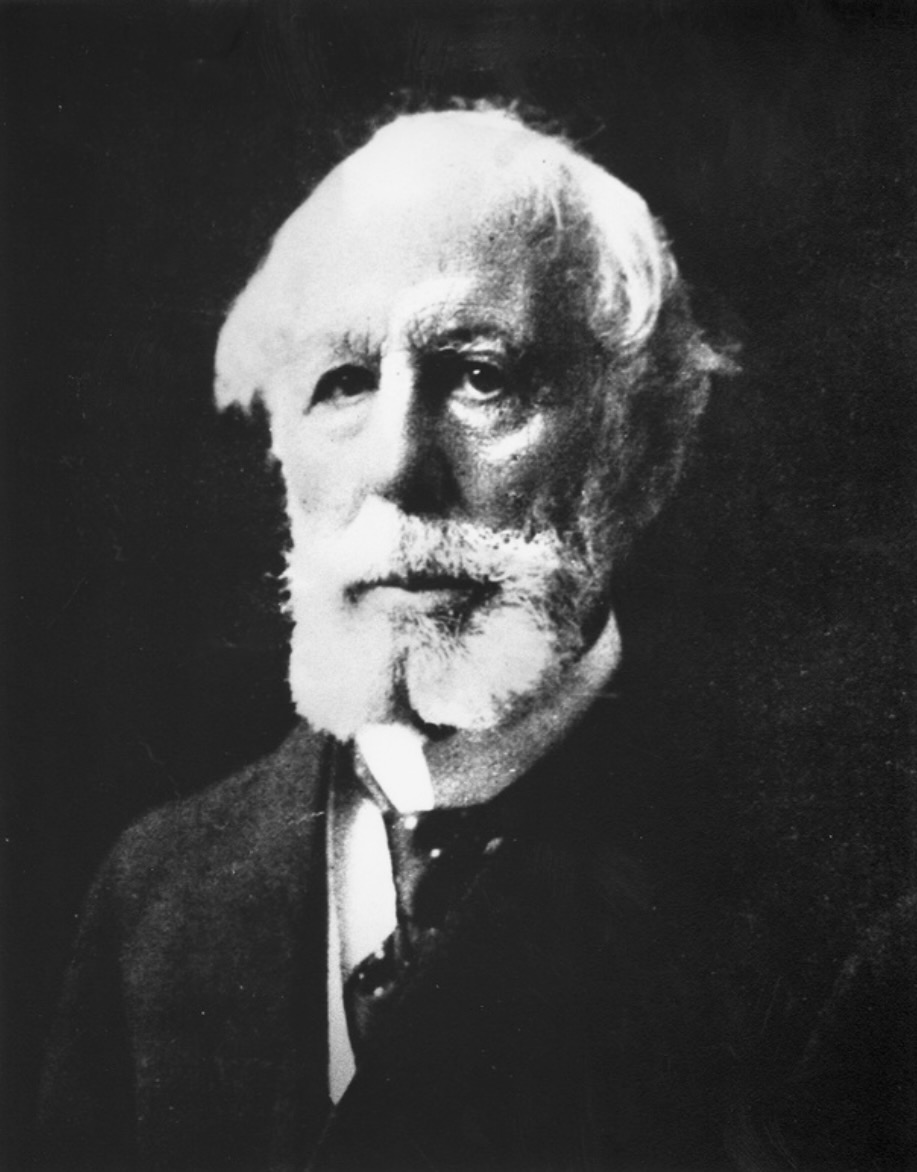

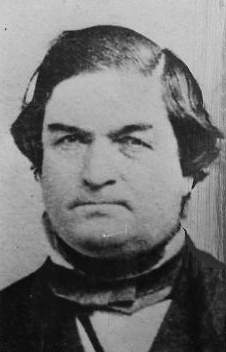
Nominee	John McDougal	Richard Roman	John B. Frisbie
Party	Nonpartisan	Nonpartisan	Nonpartisan
Popular vote	7,638	2,380	1,596
Percentage	54.73%	17.05%	11.44%
Nominee	Francis J. Lippitt	A. M. Winn
Party	Nonpartisan	Nonpartisan
Popular vote	1,166	805
Percentage	8.36%	5.77%
Lieutenant Governor before election
Office Established
Elected Lieutenant Governor
John McDougal
Nonpartisan

The 1849 California lieutenant gubernatorial election was held on November 13, 1849, in order to elect the first Lieutenant Governor of California upon California acquiring statehood on September 9, 1850. Candidate John McDougal defeated candidate Richard Roman, candidate John B. Frisbie, candidate Francis J. Lippitt, candidate A. M. Winn, candidate and former Supreme Judge of the Provisional Government of Oregon Peter Hardeman Burnett and candidate Pablo de la Guerra.

== General election ==
On election day, November 13, 1849, candidate John McDougal won the election by a margin of 5,258 votes against his foremost opponent candidate Richard Roman. McDougal was sworn in as the 1st Lieutenant Governor of California on December 20, 1849.

=== Results ===
California lieutenant gubernatorial election, 1849
Party	Candidate	Votes	%
Nonpartisan	John McDougal	7,638	54.73
Nonpartisan	Richard Roman	2,380	17.05
Nonpartisan	John B. Frisbie	1,596	11.44
Nonpartisan	Francis J. Lippitt	1,166	8.36
Nonpartisan	A. M. Winn	805	5.77
Nonpartisan	Peter Hardeman Burnett	242	1.73
Nonpartisan	Pablo de la Guerra	129	0.92
Total votes		13,956	100.00
Nonpartisan hold			
