= Little Traverse =

Little Traverse may refer to:

In the U.S. state of Michigan:

- Little Traverse Bay
- Little Traverse Township, Michigan

There is also:

- Little Traverse Bay Bands of Odawa Indians
- Little Traverse Light, a lighthouse
