= List of mayors of Victoria, Texas =

The following is a list of mayors of the city of Victoria, Texas, United States.

== Mayors ==
No.	Portrait	Name (birth–death)	Term	Election
1		John J. Linn	1839 – 1840	
2		J.A. Moody	1840 – 1840	
3		Jas. D. Owens	1841 – 1841	
4		A.S. McDonald	1842 – 1842	
5		A.M. Wigington	early-1843 – late-1843	
6		John J.H. Grammont	late-1843 – late-1844	
7		Richard Roman (1811–1875)	1844 – 1844	
8		J.O. Wheeler; 1st term	1845 – 1846	
9		Jas. C. Allen	1847 – 1847	
10		J.O. Wheeler; 2nd term	1848 – 1849	
11		Felix B. Webb	1850 – 1850	
11		Jacob B. Price	1851 – 1851	
12		Richard Owens	1852 – 1852	
13		A.C. Beaty	1853 – 1853	
14		John A. Cunningham	1854 – 1854	
15		Geo. W. Palmer	1855 – 1855	
16		Wm. Miller; 1st term	1856 – 1857	
17		Johnson J. Rosell	1858 – 1858	
18		A. Lowe	1859 – 1859	
19		R.D.J. Hatfield	1860 – 1860	
20		Johnson J. Rosell	1861 – 1862	
21		Sam A. White	1863 – 1864	
22		J.J. Linn	1865 – 1865	
23		H.E. Bradford	1866 – 1869	
24		J.P. Kean	1869 – late-1869	
25		W.G. Thornton	1870 – 1870	
26		John Mahon	1871 – 1871	
27		Wm. Billings; 1st term	1872 – 1872	
28		A. Lowe; 1st term	1873 – 1873	
29		Wm. Southerland	1874 – 1874	
30		Wm. Billings; 2nd term	1875 – 1875	
31		Geo. Williams	1876 – 1876	
32		Chas. Malitz	1877 – 1877	
Unknown
33		N.A. Thompson	1884 – 1884	
34		I.P. Kibbe	1885 – 1885	
35		B.F. Williams; 1st term	1886 – 1886	
36		Isaac Augustus Heath; 1st term	1887 – 1888	
37		B.F. Williams; 2nd term	1899 – 1891	
38		Isaac Augustus Heath; 2nd term	1892 – 1893	
39		J.A. Munn	1894 – 1895	
40		J.A. Munn	1894 – 1895	
41		B.F. Williams; 3rd term	1896 – 1898	
42		K.J. Schneider	1899 – 1902	

- William Johnson Craig, c.1909
- S.S. Sitterle, c.1929
- H. W. Griffith, c.1953
- Cliff Berkman, c.1954-1955
- Charles C. Carsner Jr., c.1976
- Gary Middleton, c.1998-2001
- Will Armstrong, c.2008-2012
- Paul Polasek, c.2017
- Rawley McCoy, c.2019
- Duane Crocker, c.2024-present

== See also ==
- Victoria history
