= Charles G. Johnson =

Swedish-American politician (1880–1957)

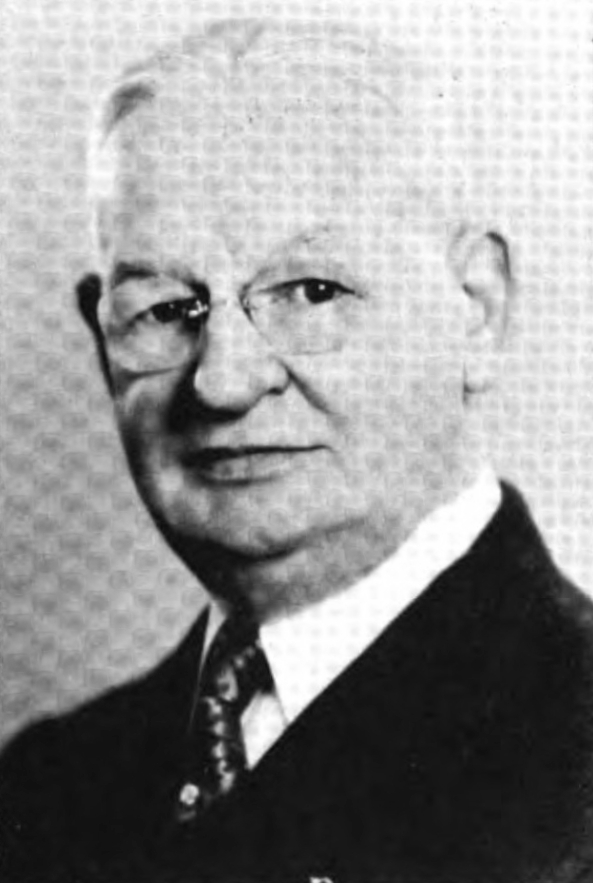
- Official portrait, 1954

22nd Treasurer of California
- In office January 9, 1923 – October 31, 1956
- Governor: Friend Richardson; C. C. Young; James Rolph; Frank Merriam; Culbert Olson; Earl Warren; Goodwin Knight
- Preceded by: Friend Richardson
- Succeeded by: A. Ronald Button

Personal details
- Born: Charles Gus Johnson; October 12, 1880 Sweden
- Died: October 14, 1957 (aged 77) Sacramento, California, U.S.
- Party: Republican
- Children: 3

Charles Gus Johnson (October 12, 1880 – October 14, 1957) was a Swedish-American politician who served as the 22nd California state treasurer from 1923 to 1956.

== Early life ==
Johnson was born on October 12, 1880, in Sweden.

== Career ==
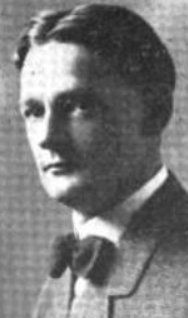
Johnson c. 1915

From 1913 to 1921, Johnson served as California State Superintendent of Weights and Measures. Elected as California state treasurer in 1923, he was the longest-serving state treasurer and also California's only longest-serving Republican Party State Treasurer. Johnson was forced to resign on October 31, 1956, after stories, which were started by A. Ronald Button who assumed the position of Treasurer after Johnson, alleging that Johnson was funnelling state funds into personal loans; none of which was proving. He was a member of the California Republican Party.

== Personal life ==
Johnson has three children: Virginia L. Johnson, Claire Fitzgerald, and George W. Johnson. Johnston died on October 14, 1957, in Sacramento, California, at age 77.

Political offices
Preceded by Edward D. Roberts	State Treasurer of California; 1923–1956	Succeeded by A. Ronald Button
