= Thomas W. Hayes =

American politician (born 1945)

28th California State Treasurer
- In office 1989 – January 7, 1991
- Governor: George Deukmejian
- Preceded by: Jesse M. Unruh
- Succeeded by: Kathleen Brown

Director of Finance of California
- In office 1991–1993
- Governor: Pete Wilson
- In office 1979–1989

Personal details
- Born: December 5, 1945 (age 80)
- Party: Republican

Thomas W. Hayes (born December 5, 1945) was the 28th California State Treasurer and a Republican. He was nominated by Governor George Deukmejian to fill the vacancy that was created on August 4, 1987, by the death of Democratic incumbent Jesse M. Unruh. Hayes took office in 1989, upon confirmation by both houses of the California Legislature.

Hayes was Governor Deukmejian's second nominee. The first, Congressman Dan Lungren, was refused confirmation by the State Senate. In 1990, Hayes won the Republican nomination for a full term as state treasurer, defeating former Treasurer of the United States Angela "Bay" Buchanan (sister of Patrick J. Buchanan) in the primary, but lost the general election to Democrat Kathleen Brown.

Prior to his service as state treasurer, Hayes had served as Auditor General of the State of California from 1979 to 1989. After leaving office as state treasurer in January 1991, he joined the administration of newly elected Governor Pete Wilson as the Director of Finance, serving from 1991 to 1993. Since then, he has worked in the private sector, with occasional forays into public service, most notably assisting Orange County with its finances after its notorious 1994 bankruptcy triggered by derivatives investments that went awry.

== See also ==
- Oral History Interview with Thomas W. Hayes (1995). California State Archives.

Political offices
| Preceded by Elizabeth Whitney; Acting | Treasurer of California; 1989 – January 7, 1991 | Succeeded by Kathleen Brown |
Party political offices
| Preceded by Donald J. French | Republican nominee for Treasurer of California; 1990 | Succeeded by Matt Fong |
