= Selden A. McMeans =

American physician and politician (1806–1876)

Selden Allen McMeans

California State Treasurer
- In office 1854–1856
- Preceded by: Richard Roman
- Succeeded by: Henry Bates

Member of the California State Assembly, 12th District
- In office 1852–1854 Serving with John Bigler, Daniel J. Lisle, Charles Robinson

Personal details
- Born: 1806 Knoxville, Tennessee, United States
- Died: July 31, 1876 (aged 70) Reno, Nevada, United States
- Party: Democratic
- Occupation: Physician
- Profession: Politician

Military service
- Allegiance: United States
- Branch/service: United States Volunteers
- Battles/wars: Mexican–American War

Selden Allen McMeans (July 1806 – July 31, 1876) was an American medical doctor and politician.

Born near Knoxville, Tennessee, McMeans first began practicing medicine in the 1840s in Greenville, South Carolina. In 1846, he volunteered for service in the Mexican–American War. After the war ended, he moved to El Dorado County, California, where he was a member of the California State Assembly for the 12th District (1852–54) and served as the second California State Treasurer (1854–56).

In the fall of 1859, McMeans moved to Virginia City, Nevada after the Comstock Lode silver strike. When the news of the firing on Fort Sumter reached Virginia City in 1861, McMeans announced that he would capture Fort Churchill for the Confederacy, but was quickly disabused of this notion by news of a detachment of Union soldiers heading from Fort Churchill to Virginia City. After the Civil War, he organized the Democratic Party in Nevada and became its first chairman. He eventually moved to Reno, where he died at age 70 in 1876.

California Assembly
Preceded by John Bigler, Daniel J. Lisle, Charles Robinson	California State Assemblyman, 12th District; 1852–1854 (with three others)	Succeeded by Four members
Political offices
Preceded by Richard Roman	State Treasurer of California; 1854–1856	Succeeded by Henry Bates
