= California State Treasurer =

Position in state government

State Treasurer of California
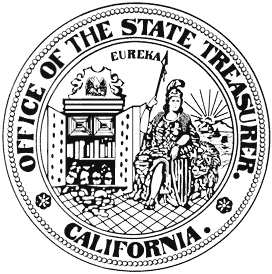
- Seal of the state treasurer of California

- State flag

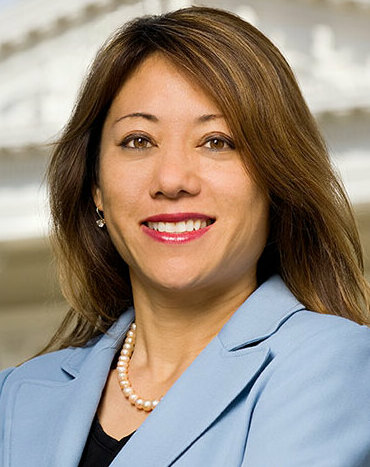
- Incumbent; Fiona Ma since January 7, 2019
- Government of California
- Style: The Honorable
- Term length: Four years, two term limit
- Inaugural holder: Richard Roman; 1849
- Formation: California Constitution
- Succession: Sixth
- Salary: $146,896 (2019)
- Website: www.treasurer.ca.gov

The state treasurer of California is a constitutional officer in the executive branch of the government of the U.S. state of California. The incumbent treasurer, Democrat Fiona Ma, is the 34th individual to have held the office since statehood. The state treasurer's main office is located in the Jesse M. Unruh State Office Building in Sacramento.

== Election and term of office ==
The state treasurer assumes office by way of election. The term of office is four years, renewable once. Elections for state treasurer are held on a four-year basis concurrently with elections for the offices of governor, lieutenant governor, attorney general, secretary of state, state controller, insurance commissioner, and superintendent of public instruction.

== Powers and duties ==
The state treasurer serves as the chief banker, financier, and asset manager for the state of California and its agencies. As such, the state treasurer:

- Manages the state's cash flows. Cash management involves the collection, accounting, deposit and use of money and securities received by the state. Centralizing cash management within the state treasury allows for better monitoring of the state's cash position, fund balances and liquidity, thereby allowing the state of California to more effectively pay its bills and invest idle funds.
- Coordinates banking services across state government. This function entails designating banks and other depository institutions as eligible to receive public deposits, ensuring public depositories have sufficient collateral, and administering California's Time Deposit Program.
- Safeguards public funds held in the state treasury. The state treasurer pays out sums of money only on warrants lawfully drawn by the state controller or pursuant to state agency vouchers examined and approved by the state controller.
- Issues and manages public debt. To this end, the treasurer is trustee, registrar, and paying agent for all general obligation and revenue bonds contracted by the state of California. In addition, the state treasurer supervises and reports on municipal debt.
- Invests state funds. Assets under the state treasurer's management include state and local government investment pools along with California's ABLE, college savings, and retirement savings trust funds. However, the state treasurer does not direct the investment of pension funds. Public pensions in California are instead invested by the respective boards of trustees of the California Public Employees' Retirement System and the California State Teachers' Retirement System. Nevertheless, the state treasurer is an ex officio member of these boards.
- Administers California's ABLE, college savings, and retirement savings programs. These tax-advantaged, state-facilitated programs promote affordable higher education, financial security for disabled Californians, and a secure retirement.
- Chairs the Tax Credit Allocation Committee and serves as an ex officio board member of the California Housing Finance Agency. These panels award hundreds of millions of dollars annually in tax credits for affordable housing and finances affordable housing projects throughout the state.
- Chairs or serves on dozens of boards and commissions, most of which relate to the marketing of bonds and their management. The bonds so issued finance a wide range of significant projects, including pollution clean-up, transportation infrastructure, renewable energy development, fish and wildlife conservation, economic development, student loan refinancing, school buildings construction and maintenance, and financial aid to small businesses, nonprofits, and health care facilities.

== History ==
The Office was retained as an elective office in the New Constitution of 1879, in recognition by the Workingman's Party (which factored heavily in the State's constitutional convention) that The Treasurer had a significant impact on local credit guidance under the National Bank system established by the Lincoln Administration. Transcontinental cash settlements were still restricted, so California's local development was driven by a relatively high proportion of local gold reserve deposits. In 1907, the State Treasurer was instrumental in a massive expansion of credit to rebuild San Francisco after the 1906 Earthquake, however, at that time the Treasurer was essentially an office controlled by the railroads. In 1907, the expansion of California money supply led by the Treasurer selling bonds to build the Port of San Francisco seawall exposed liquidity problems due to corruption in the New York Clearinghouse, causing the Panic of 1907.

Progressive governor Hiram Johnson left the office essentially untouched. Of the office, he had this to say in his first inaugural:

The most advanced thought in our nation has reached the conclusion that we can best avoid blind voting and best obtain the discrimination of the electorate by a short ballot. A very well known editor in our State, during a recent lecture at Stanford University, challenged the faculty of that great institution to produce a single man who had cast an intelligent vote for the office of State Treasurer, and none was produced. Fortunately our State Treasurer is the highest type of citizen and official. The reason the challenge could not be met was that, in the hurry of our existence and in the engrossing importance of the contests for one or two offices, we can not or do not inform ourselves sufficiently regarding the candidates for minor offices... If we can remedy this condition it is our duty to do so, and it is plain that the remedy is by limiting the elective list of offices to those that are naturally conspicuous.

The creation of the Federal Reserve in 1913 significantly restricted the power of the State Treasurer to influence local economic development, essentially centralizing National Monetary policy. During the First World War, this was deployed toward War Mobilization. Still, State Bond issuance for major infrastructure projects characterized the office into the 1960s, including bonds for the State Parks System in the 20's, to build facilities for the 1932 Olympic Games, for the Postwar expansion of the University of California and State University Systems, for the State Water Project of 1960, and for the massive expansion of the State Prison System in the 1980s. As California's population and economy expanded, the Local Agency Investment Fund became a significant market player, and the Office developed the capacity to bail out troubled corporations by buying up their bond issuances.

Ivy Baker Priest stands out as the first woman to be elected to any California statewide office (from 1967 to 1975), having already served as Eisenhower's Treasurer of the United States in the 1950s. She was famous for aphorisms, including "We women don't care too much about getting our pictures on money as long as we can get our hands on it." With the election of Kathleen Brown in 1990 as a Democrat, the Democratic-lead legislature significantly expanded the scope and duties of the office; however, the Orange County Bankruptcy also lead the legislature to significantly curtail the permissible investment policies of Treasurer-administered pooled local investments. Although the Treasurer has nominal advisory authority over local debt issuance, the Treasurer was powerless to prevent local government entities such as Stockton or San Bernardino from falling into insolvency.

== List of treasurers ==
Image	Name	Term	Party
	Richard Roman	1849–1854	Democratic
	Selden A. McMeans	1854–1856	Democratic
	Henry Bates	1856–1857	American
	James L. English	1857–1858	American
	Thomas Findley	1858–1862	Democratic
	Delos R. Ashley	1862–1863	Republican
	Romualdo Pacheco	1863–1867	Republican
	Antonio F. Coronel	1867–1871	Democratic
	Ferdinand Baehr	1871–1875	Republican
	José G. Estudillo	1875–1880	Democratic
	John Weil	1880–1883	Republican
	William A. January	1883–1884	Democratic
	Denis J. Oullahan	1884–1887	Democratic
	Adam Herold	1887–1891	Democratic
	J. R. McDonald	1891–1895	Republican
	Levi Rackliffe	1895–1898	Republican
	Will S. Green	1898–1899	Democratic
	Truman Reeves	1899–1907	Republican
	William R. Williams	1907–1911	Republican
	Edward D. Roberts	1911–1915	Republican
	Friend William Richardson	1915–1923	Progressive; Republican
	Charles G. Johnson	1923–1956	Republican
	A. Ronald Button	1956–1959	Republican
	Bert A. Betts	1959–1967	Democratic
	Ivy Baker Priest	1967–1975	Republican
	Jesse M. Unruh	1975–1987	Democratic
	Elizabeth Whitney	1987–1989	
	Thomas W. Hayes	1989–1991	Republican
	Kathleen Brown	1991–1995	Democratic
	Matt Fong	1995–1999	Republican
	Phil Angelides	1999–2007	Democratic
	Bill Lockyer	2007–2015	Democratic
	John Chiang	2015–2019	Democratic
	Fiona Ma	2019–present	Democratic

== See also ==
- Impeachment in California
