= José Guadalupe Estudillo =

American politician (1838–1917)

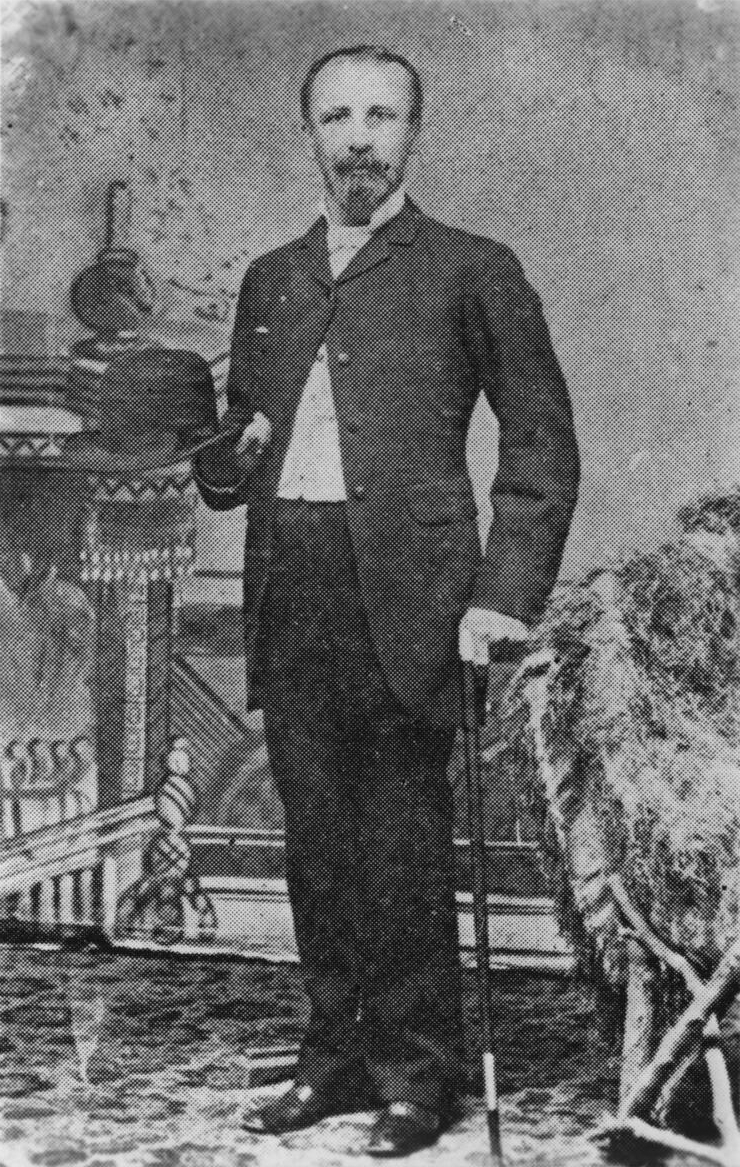

10th Treasurer of California
- In office 1875–1880
- Governor: Ferdinand Baehr
- Preceded by: John Weil

County Treasurer of San Diego County
- In office 1864–1875

Personal details
- Born: 1838 San Diego, California
- Died: 1917 (aged 78–79) San Diego, California

José Guadalupe Concepción Estudillo (1838-1917) was a Californio politician, who served as California State Treasurer and treasurer of San Diego County. He was a member of the prominent Estudillo family of California.

== Early life ==
José G. Estudillo is the son of José Antonio Estudillo, a prominent early settler of San Diego, California.

== Career ==
He served as County treasurer during 1864–1875, city councilman of San Diego, and California State Treasurer, 1875–1880.

Later, he moved to Los Angeles and married Adelaide Mulholland.

Political offices
Preceded by Joseph S. Manasse	President of the San Diego Board of Trustees; 1868–1869	Succeeded by James McCoy
Preceded by Ferdinand Baehr	State Treasurer of California; 1875–1880	Succeeded by John Weil
