= Little Traverse Light =

Lighthouse in Michigan, United States

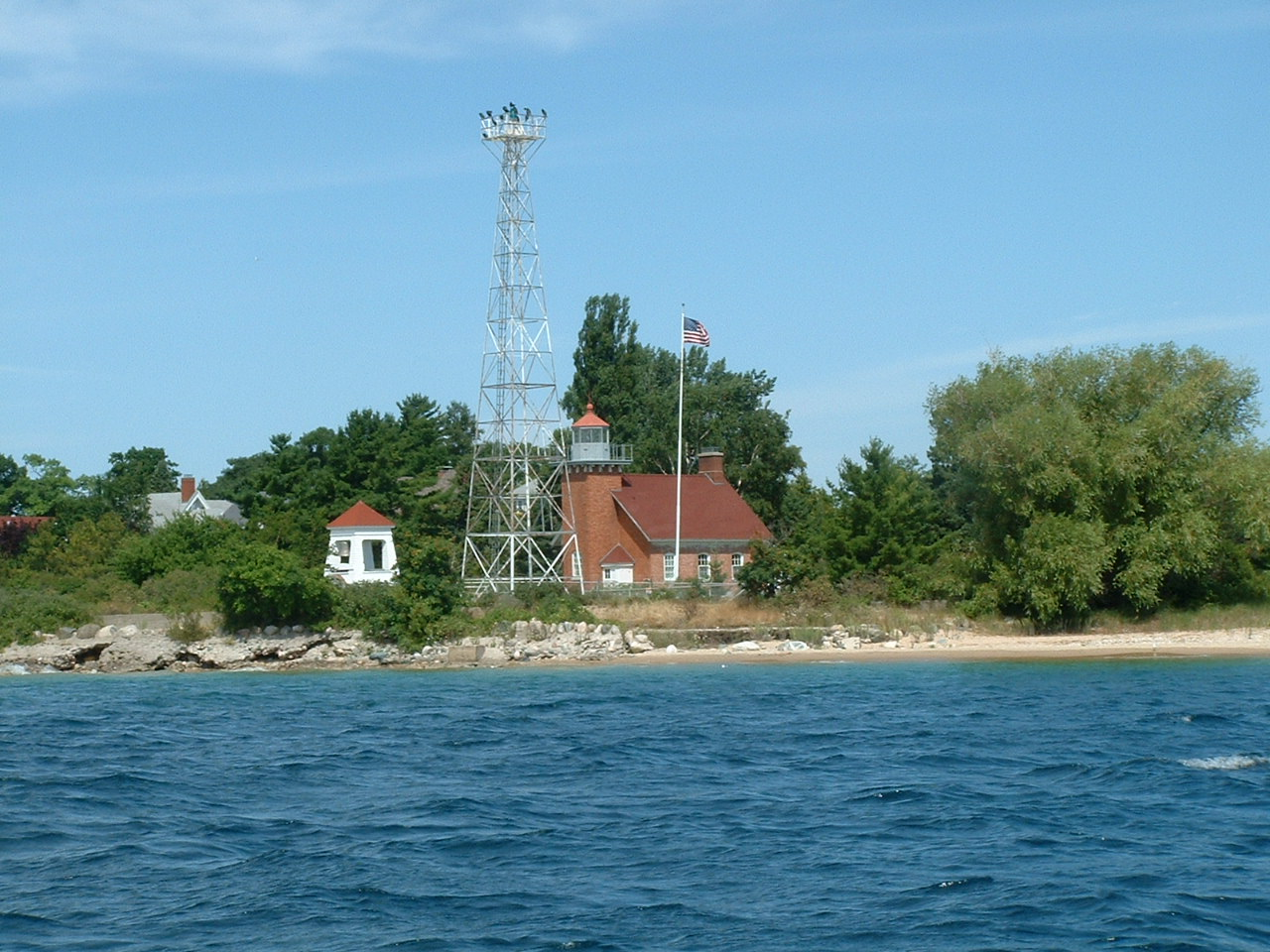
- The Little Traverse Lighthouse with its replacement light tower and fog bell
- Location: Harbor Springs, Michigan
- Coordinates: 45°25′9.078″N 84°58′38.682″W

Tower
- Construction: red brick
- Height: 41 feet (12 m)
- Shape: Square, attached 2 story Lighthouse keeper's house
- Markings: Red brick, Natural with white lantern, red roof

Light
- First lit: 1884
- Deactivated: 1963
- Focal height: 41 feet (12 m)
- Lens: Fourth order Fresnel lens
- Range: 10 nautical miles (19 km; 12 mi)
- Characteristic: Fl G 6s

The Little Traverse Light is located in Emmet County in the U.S. state of Michigan on the north side of the Little Traverse Bay of Lake Michigan on Harbor Point in West Traverse Township near Harbor Springs, Michigan. It marks the entrance to the harbor at Harbor Springs.

== History ==
In 1871, Orlando M. Poe recommended the construction of this light. However, a paucity of funds delayed the United States Congress in acting on the request.

The site was purchased in 1883, and the United States Lighthouse Service built the light in 1884.

The decagonal lantern room is painted white and has a red roof. The fourth order Fresnel lens was manufactured in Paris by L. Sautter, Lemonnie & Co. in 1881.

A "very rare" fog bell square pyramidal tower was built in 1896 in front of the tower. The structure and the striking mechanism are still in place. Other structures included a brick paint locker, summer kitchen, wooden boat storage shed, and auto garage

The lighthouse was manned by personnel until 1963 when a modern replacement light and tower was constructed, consisting of a white steel skeleton on a foundation of concrete. It is 62 feet (19 m) tall, with a focal plane of 72 feet (22 m), It emits a green flash every six seconds. It is located on the point east of the lighthouse.

It is very difficult to visit the lighthouse as it is located on private property and unless you own a house in the gated community or are a guest. The lighthouse is not available to the public and people are not allowed inside. There is checkpoint that is manned 24 hours a day at the entrance.

This unique lighthouse has been the subject of paintings.

Elizabeth Whitney Williams was one of the first female lighthouse keepers to serve on the Great Lakes, and wrote a memoir that included her experiences at this light.

== See also ==
- Lighthouses in the United States
