= Elizabeth Whitney Williams =

American lighthouse keeper

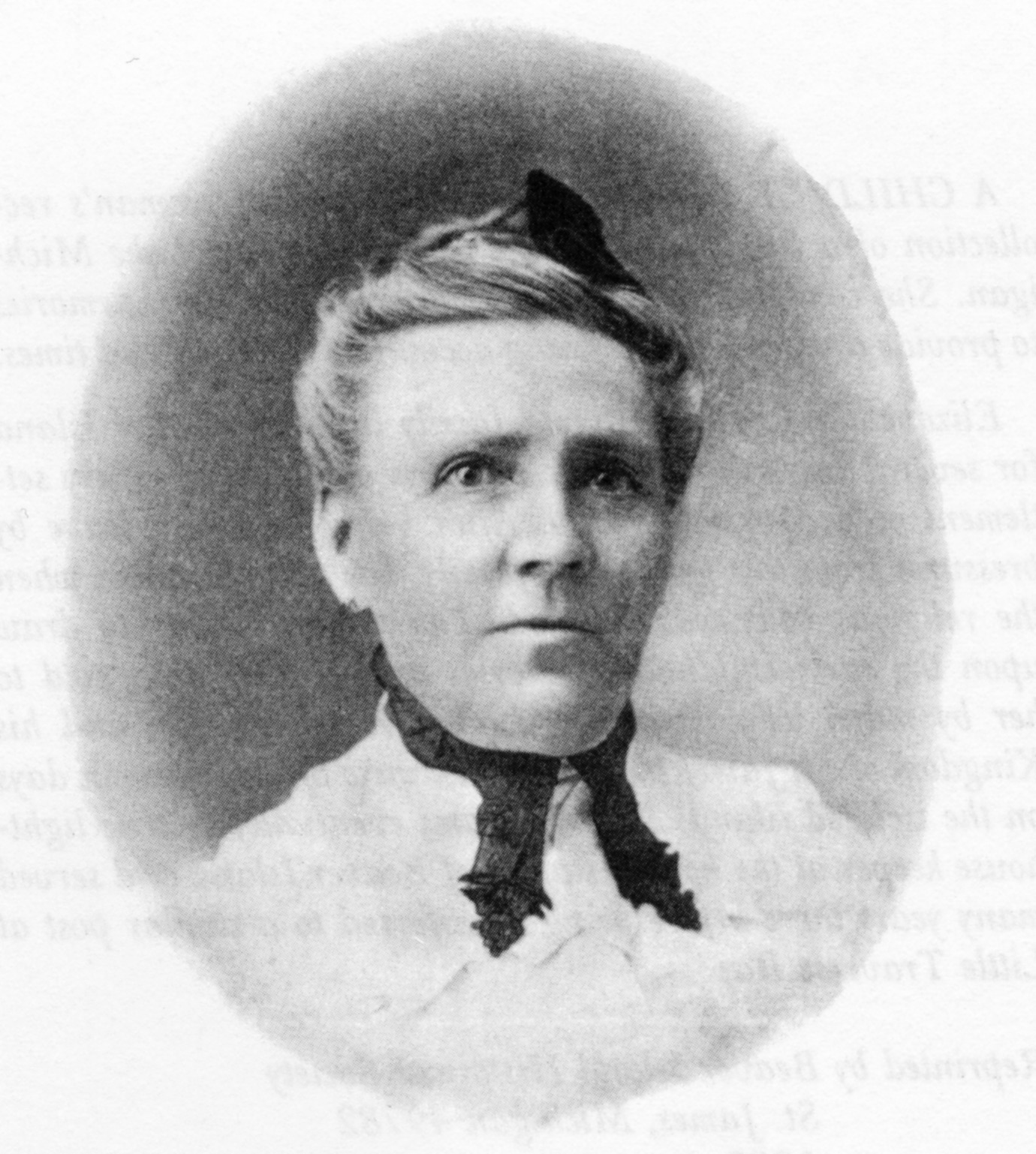
- Born: Elizabeth Whitney; June 24, 1844; Mackinac Island, Michigan
- Died: January 23, 1938 (aged 93); Charlevoix, Michigan
- Other name: Elizabeth Whitney Van Riper
- Occupation: Lighthouse keeper
- Years active: 1872–1913
- Notable work: A Child of the Sea and Life Among the Mormons on Beaver Island.
- Spouse(s): Clement Van Riper (m. 1860; died 1872) Daniel Williams (m. 1875)

Elizabeth Whitney Williams was an American lighthouse keeper and writer. She served as a lighthouse keeper for 41 years, including a 29-year stint at the Little Traverse Light.

== Early life ==
Williams (née Whitney) was born on Mackinac Island, Michigan, on June 24, 1844, as the only child of Elizabeth Cross Dousman Gebeau (1796–1896) and Walter Whitney (1809–1870). The Matriarch Elizabeth had been married first to Louis Gebeau, who drowned in an 1841 boating accident on Lake Michigan. By the time she was four years old, young Elizabeth's family had moved to Beaver Island where her father, a carpenter, worked for the Mormon leader "King" James Strang. In 1852, after being pressured to convert, the Whitney family fled to Charlevoix and then to Traverse City. After Strang was assassinated and the Mormons were forced out, the Whitney family returned to Beaver Island in 1857 where Williams met and married Clement Van Riper, a cooper from Detroit, in 1860. Van Riper began teaching in the nearby Anishinaabe community on Garden Island, where Williams assisted her husband and taught gardening techniques.

== Career ==
In 1869, Van Riper was appointed keeper of the Beaver Island Harbor Light after the prior keeper, Peter McKinley, resigned due to poor health. However, Van Riper was also often in poor health and Williams assisted her husband by cleaning and polishing the Fresnel lens.

During a stormy night in 1872, Van Riper rowed out to help rescue crew from the schooner Thomas Howland, which was sinking in the harbor, but he died in his efforts. The duty fell on Williams to keep the light burning in the lighthouse during the three-day storm and she was left "weak from sorrow." A few weeks after her husband's death she was officially appointed keeper of the Beaver Island Harbor Light during a time when few women were ever appointed and lighthouse keeping was thought of as a man's job due to the physical labor and investment of time. She found the responsibility daunting but "longed to do something for humanity's sake" and seemed to view tending the light as both a calling and comfort.

In 1875, Williams remarried—to photographer Daniel Williams—and eventually requested a transfer to a lighthouse on the mainland. In September 1884, she was transferred to the newly constructed Little Traverse Light at Harbor Springs. Williams excelled at her work and later won an award for best-kept light on the Great Lakes.

== Later life ==
Williams retired in 1913 and moved to Charlevoix with her husband where they spent 25 years in quiet retirement. Williams died, 12 hours after her husband, on January 23, 1938.

== Legacy ==
Williams is one of America's longest-serving lighthouse keepers with 41 years of service. In 1905, Williams published an autobiography entitled A Child of the Sea and My Life Among Mormons, which is available for online reading through Project Gutenberg. A children's book, Elizabeth Whitney Williams and The Little Traverse Light, is based upon Williams' life. In December 2024, Elizabeth was inducted into the Michigan Women's Hall of Fame.
