= Ferdinand Baehr =

American politician (1822–1892)

Ferdinand William Baehr

California State Treasurer
- In office September 6, 1871 – September 7, 1875
- Preceded by: Antonio F. Coronel
- Succeeded by: José G. Estudillo

Personal details
- Born: 1822
- Died: 1892 (aged 69–70)
- Party: Republican
- Spouse: Augusta Catharine Scroder (m. 1857)
- Children: William Baehr Jr.
- Occupation: Businessman; manufacturing jeweler

Ferdinand William Baehr (1822–1892) was a Republican politician from California. He served as California State Treasurer in 1871–1875.

== Businessman ==
In 1869, the San Francisco Directory listed Ferdinand Baehr as a manufacturing jeweler with the firm Baehr William & Co.

== Family man ==
Ferdinand Baehr married Augusta Catharine Scroder in 1857. They had a son William Baehr Jr., who became a partner in the firm A. Gerberding & Co.

== State office-holder ==
Ferdinand Baehr became California State Treasurer after winning elections on Republican ticket on September 6, 1871, and served as state treasurer until September 7, 1875, when he lost after running as an independent candidate.

Political offices
Preceded by Antonio F. Coronel	State Treasurer of California; 1871–1875	Succeeded by José G. Estudillo
