= Denis J. Oullahan =

American politician (1824–1889)

Denis Joseph Oullahan

State Treasurer of California
- In office 1884–1887
- Preceded by: William A. January
- Succeeded by: J. R. McDonald
- Parliamentary group: Democratic

Denis Joseph Oullahan (c. 1824 – November 5, 1889) served as California State Treasurer 1884–1887.

== Career ==
He was late the Democratic delegate for San Joaquin County 1873–1889. He also served in the military with the Montgomery Guard located in San Francisco. He was Captain; elected January 22, 1864; commissioned February 9, 1864.

== Sources ==
Political offices
Preceded by William A. January	State Treasurer of California; 1895–1898	Succeeded by J. R. McDonald
