= Friend Richardson =

Governor of California (1865–1943)

Friend William Richardson
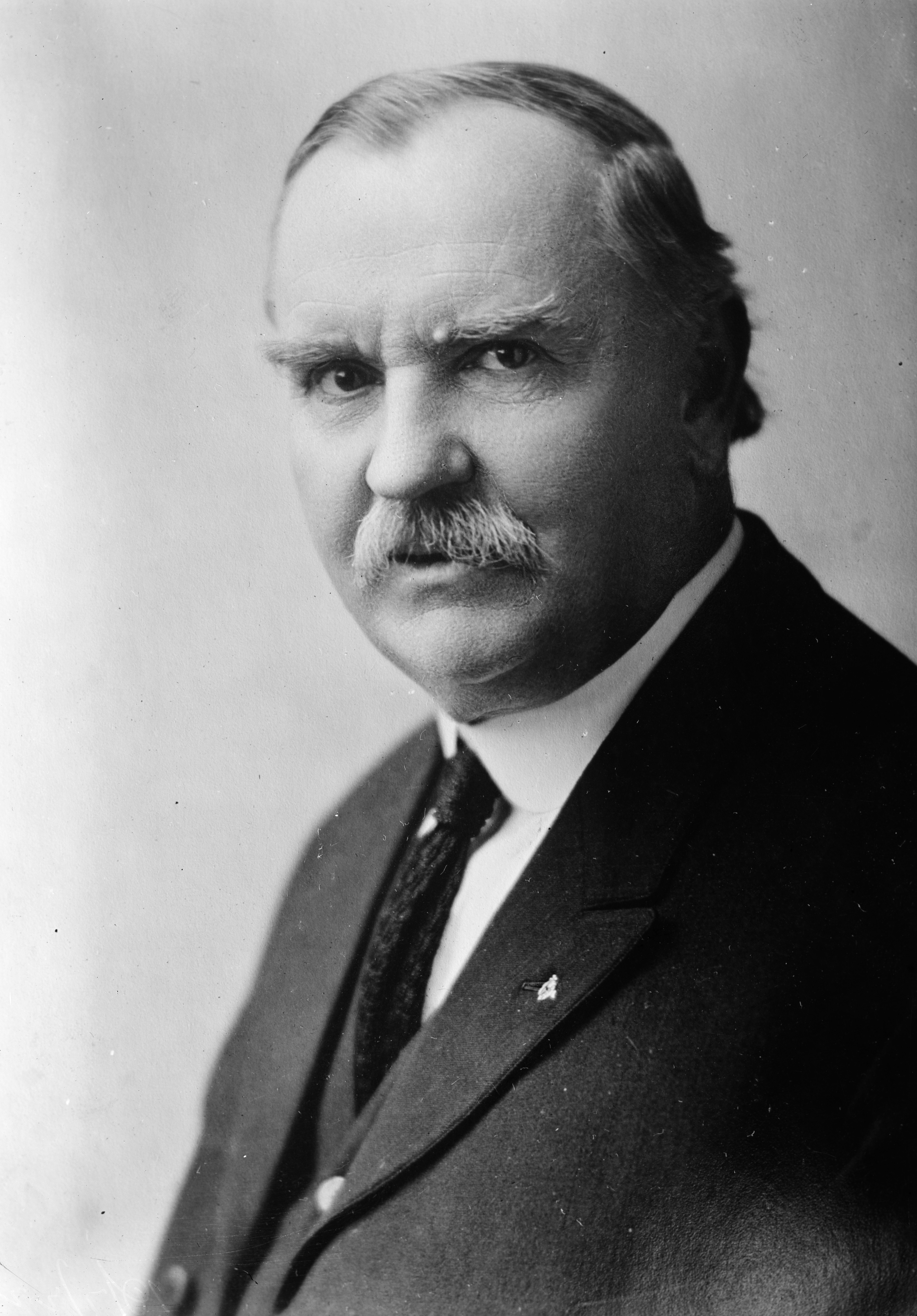

25th Governor of California
- In office January 9, 1923 – January 4, 1927
- Lieutenant: C. C. Young
- Preceded by: William D. Stephens
- Succeeded by: C. C. Young

21st Treasurer of California
- In office January 5, 1915 – January 9, 1923
- Governor: Hiram Johnson; William Stephens
- Preceded by: Edward D. Roberts
- Succeeded by: Charles G. Johnson

Personal details
- Born: William Richardson; December 1, 1865 Friends Colony, Michigan, US
- Died: September 6, 1943 (aged 77) Berkeley, California, US
- Party: Progressive; Republican
- Spouse: Augusta Felder
- Children: 3
- Profession: Publisher, politician

Friend William Richardson (born William Richardson; December 1, 1865 – September 6, 1943) was an American newspaper publisher and politician. A member of the Progressive Party and later the Republican Party, Richardson was elected as the California State Treasurer from 1915 to 1923 and shortly afterwards as the 25th governor of California from 1923 to 1927.

Richardson's governorship marked a sharp reversal in policies from previous administrations by rolling back many of the Progressive reforms and state governmental agencies put in place by previous governors Hiram Johnson and William Stephens.

== Early life and career ==
William Richardson was born in December 1865 to William and Rhoda Richardson at Friends Colony, Michigan, a Quaker township located outside of Ann Arbor. Early in his life, William legally changed his first name to "Friend", the traditional Quaker greeting. In his young adult life, Richardson worked as a county clerk and law librarian, and following his move to San Bernardino, California, married Augusta Felder in 1891 with whom he had five children. Five years later, Richardson became the owner and newspaper editor of The San Bernardino Times Index.

In 1900, Richardson relocated to Berkeley, where he purchased within a year The Berkeley Daily Gazette and became active in the California Press Association. Due to greater name recognition, Richardson was increasingly noticed by the state government. In 1901, Richardson was appointed as Superintendent of the State Printing Office with the consent of the California State Legislature and Governor Henry Gage. The Richardson family relocated to Sacramento, where he assumed state printing responsibilities while at the same time continuing to own his newspapers in both San Bernardino and Berkeley.

In 1914, Richardson officially entered politics by running as a Progressive for California State Treasurer. Richardson easily defeated his Socialist and Prohibitionist rivals by a voting gap of 66 percent. Following the Progressive Party's collapse, Richardson won a second term as Treasurer in 1918, this time as a Republican, and again won a landslide victory against his Socialist and Prohibitionist rivals by garnering 78.2 percent of the vote.

After two successful terms as state treasurer, Richardson set his sights on the governorship as the Republican Party's nominee in 1922. Running against the incumbent, William Stephens, in the party's primary election, Richardson campaigned on a conservative platform, capitalizing on electoral fatigue with Progressive-minded politics. The campaign worked by successfully defeating Governor Stephens and effectively returning the state Republican Party to a more conservative bent.

With Stephens out of the 1922 general election, Richardson faced Democrat Thomas L. Woolwine, the popular District Attorney of Los Angeles County. Amongst Richardson's supporters in the election were the Ku Klux Klan, although California state Republican chairman A. E. Boynton repudiated their support. The Klan deeply opposed Woolwine's Catholicism and was rumored to count Richardson as a member. Richardson's campaign manager in the election, Assemblyman Frank Merriam, would himself become governor in 1934. In the end, Richardson triumphed in the election and defeated Woolwine by nearly 24 percent of the vote.

== Governorship ==
Richardson began his governorship on January 9, 1923, promising a no-frills administration to deeply cut governmental expenditures. Despite his past affiliation with the Progressive Party, Richardson blamed both the party and its Progressive movement with excess in his inaugural speech for replacing the Southern Pacific Railroad political machine with a Progressive machine: "In 1911 the people did a good job of political house cleaning," Richardson said, alluding to Hiram Johnson and his Progressive majority in the Legislature. "During the past few years another great political machine has come into power which has cost the people millions of dollars. It will be necessary to first wreck this political machine before the state can be put on an economical basis and the government again handed back to the people."

Richardson embarked on a program to eliminate "unnecessary boards and officers, by consolidation, and by doing away with overlapping functions" and called it a massive waste of taxpayers’ money. In the preface to his proposed 1923 budget to the Legislature, Richardson declared his opposition to pork barrel politics and that "[m]y chief burden has been to relieve the people of their great burden of taxation." In his various modifications to the state bureaucracy, Richardson appointed various individuals that were favorable to corporate interests.

An electoral backlash against his deep-rooted fiscal conservatism came during the 1924 legislative elections, when resurgent Progressives regained control of the California State Legislature, beginning a legislative bulwark against more proposed cuts to the state government and increased corporate influence. A proposal by Richardson to close two state universities, believing that education had become too costly for state coffers, was successfully defeated by the Progressives. Meanwhile, Richardson blocked the Progressives' passage of a bill in the Legislature to create a professional State Bar of California with a pocket veto in 1925.

As the legislature and Richardson thwarted each other's political agendas, the governor attended to other duties outside of the political realm. Richardson personally accompanied Swedish Prince Gustaf Adolf and Princess Louise Mountbatten on a portion of their tour through Southern California in 1926.

That same year, the increasingly-embattled Richardson faced a crucial primary election. Growing anger at Richardson's overly-conservative administration led to the progressive wing of the Republican Party supporting C. C. Young, the lieutenant governor under both William Stephens and Richardson. Young emerged victorious in the primary vote, depriving Richardson of the chance to run in the general election.

Defeated by his own party, Richardson left the governorship as his term expired on January 4, 1927. One accomplishment to his various eliminations and consolidations to the state government was a surplus of $20 million in the state treasury.

== Later life ==
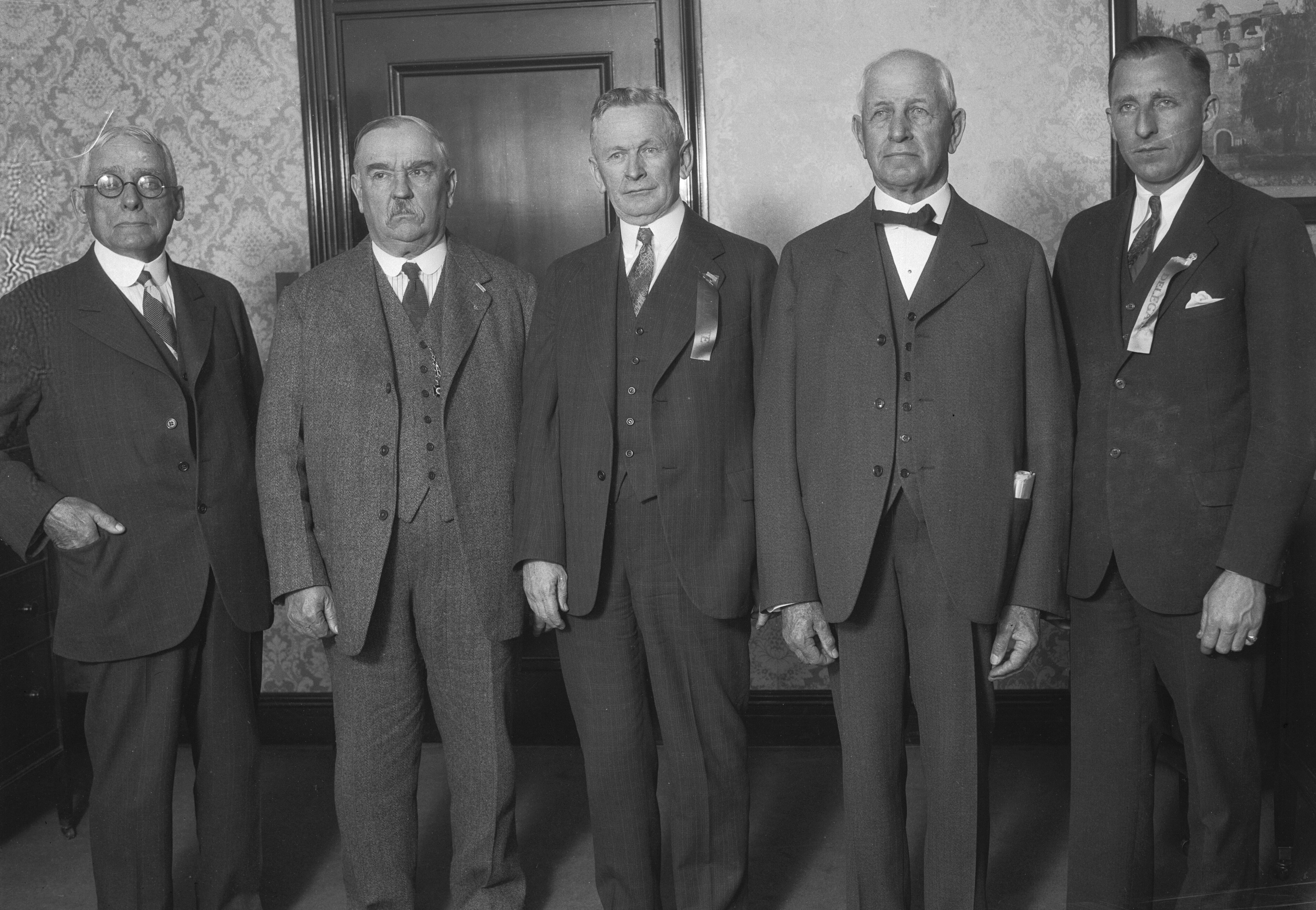
Current and former governors and lieutenant governors of California at a Herbert Hoover rally in Los Angeles, April 4, 1928. (L-R): Albert Joseph Wallace, Friend Richardson, C. C. Young, William Stephens, Buron Fitts

Richardson returned to newspaper publishing and became the chief publisher of the Alameda Times Star in 1931. He became politically active again in the 1930s though in appointed positions. He served as the State Building and Loan Commissioner under James Rolph from 1932 to 1934 and as the State Superintendent of Banks from 1934 to 1939 under his 1922 campaign manager, Frank Merriam. He retired from public life in 1939.

In July 1943, Richardson suffered a heart attack from which he never recovered, and he died at his Berkeley home on September 6, 1943. His ashes are now interred at the Chapel of the Chimes in Oakland.

Throughout his life, Richardson was a member of the Freemasons, the Knights Templar, the Shriners, the Order of the Eastern Star, the Elks, the Kiwanis, the Moose, the Independent Order of Odd Fellows, Rotary, and the Woodmen.

Party political offices
Preceded by William Stephens	Republican nominee for Governor of California; 1922	Succeeded by C. C. Young
Political offices
Preceded by William Stephens	Governor of California; 1923–1927	Succeeded by Clement Calhoun Young
Preceded by Edward D. Roberts	Treasurer of California; 1915–1923	Succeeded by Charles G. Johnson
