= John Weil =

American politician; 11th California State Treasurer (1880–1883)

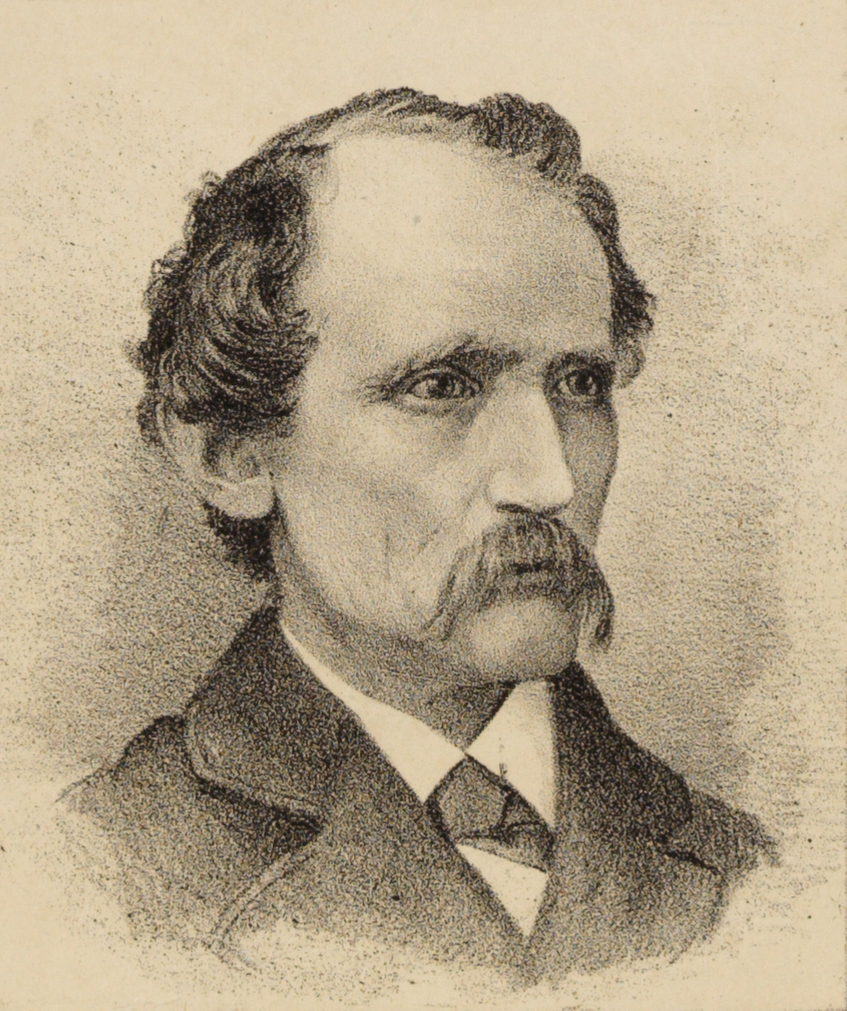
- John Weil, c. 1880s
- In office January 5, 1880 – January 1, 1883
- Preceded by: José G. Estudillo
- Succeeded by: William A. January

11th Treasurer of California

Personal details
- Party: Republican
- Profession: Public official

John Weil was an American public official who served as California State Treasurer from January 5, 1880, to January 1, 1883. A member of the Republican Party, Weil succeeded José G. Estudillo and was succeeded by William A. January.

== See also ==
Political offices
Preceded by José G. Estudillo	State Treasurer of California; 1880–1883	Succeeded by William A. January
