= Elizabeth Whitney (treasurer) =

American politician

California State Treasurer
- In office August 4, 1987 – 1989
- Preceded by: Jesse M. Unruh
- Succeeded by: Thomas W. Hayes

Personal details
- Party: Democratic

Elizabeth Whitney was Deputy California State Treasurer under Democrat Jesse M. Unruh and became Acting State Treasurer upon his death on August 4, 1987. State law provided for her service to be temporary, until the gubernatorial appointment and legislative confirmation of a permanent successor. However, the reluctance of the Democratic-controlled California Legislature to cede the power of the State Treasurer's office to Congressman Dan Lungren, a nominee of Republican Governor George Deukmejian, led to an extended deadlock, and permitted Whitney to serve throughout 1988 and into 1989, when the State Senate confirmed Governor Deukmejian's second nominee, Thomas W. Hayes.

Political offices
Preceded by Jesse M. Unruh	State Treasurer of California; 1987–1989	Succeeded by Thomas W. Hayes
