= Richard Roman =

American politician

California State Treasurer
- In office 1849–1854
- Succeeded by: Selden A. McMeans

Personal details
- Born: 1811 Fayette County, Kentucky
- Died: December 22, 1875 (aged 63–64)
- Occupation: Politician

Military service
- Battles/wars: Black Hawk War; Texas Revolution

Richard Roman (1811 – December 22, 1875) was a politician. Born in Fayette County, Kentucky, after leaving medical school he saw military service in the Black Hawk War in Illinois and later in the Texas Revolution, distinguishing himself at the Battle of San Jacinto. He was a member of the Texas Republic House of Representatives for two terms. He became mayor of Victoria, Texas, in 1844 and in the same year joined the Texas Republic Senate for two years. He went to California during the California Gold Rush of 1849 and would become the first California State Treasurer, 1849–54.

== See also ==
- William T. Wallace
- List of mayors of Victoria, Texas

Political offices
Preceded by None	California State Treasurer; 1849–1854	Succeeded by Selden A. McMeans
