= Edward D. Roberts =

American politician (1864–1920)

California State Treasurer
- In office 1911–1915

Personal details
- Born: July 18, 1864 Cambria, Wisconsin, U.S.
- Died: August 4, 1920 (aged 56) San Bernardino, California, U.S.
- Party: Republican
- Occupation: Politician

Edward D. Roberts (July 18, 1864 – August 4, 1920) was an American Republican politician. Born in Cambria, Wisconsin, Roberts served as California State Treasurer, 1911–1915. He died in San Bernardino, California.

== Notes ==
Political offices
Preceded by William R. Williams	State Treasurer of California; 1911–1915	Succeeded by Friend Richardson
