= Antonio F. Coronel =

Mexican-American politician from California (1817–1894)

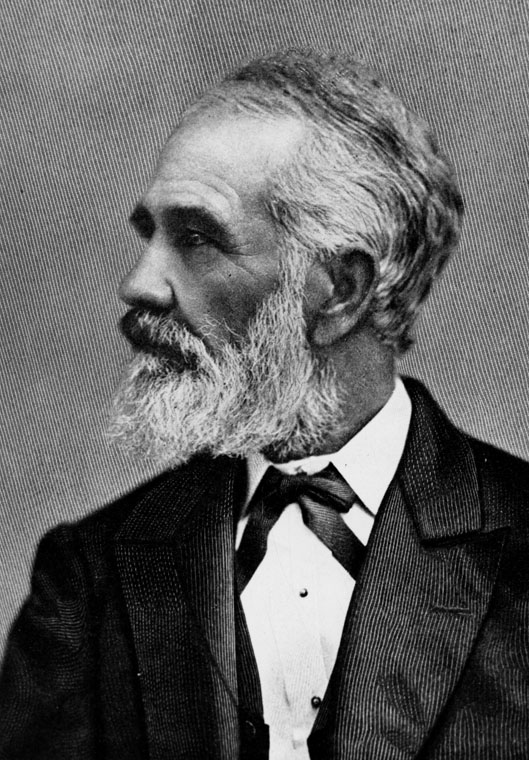

8th Treasurer of California
- In office 1867–1871
- Governor: Henry H. Haight
- Preceded by: Romualdo Pacheco
- Succeeded by: Ferdinand Baehr

4th Mayor of Los Angeles
- In office May 3, 1853 – May 4, 1854
- Preceded by: John G. Nichols
- Succeeded by: Stephen Clark Foster

1st Los Angeles County Assessor
- In office 1850–1856
- Succeeded by: Juan María Sepúlveda

Personal details
- Born: October 21, 1817 Mexico City, Viceroyalty of New Spain
- Died: April 17, 1894 (aged 76) Los Angeles, California
- Spouse: Mariana W. de Coronel (m. 1873)

Military service
- Allegiance: Mexico
- Rank: Captain
- Battles/wars: Mexican–American War; Battle of Dominguez Rancho; Battle of Río San Gabriel; Battle of La Mesa

Don Antonio Francisco Coronel (October 21, 1817 – April 17, 1894) was a Californio politician and ranchero who was Mayor of Los Angeles and California State Treasurer. Coronel was considered one of the first preservationists in Los Angeles, and his private collection formed the basis of the Natural History Museum of Los Angeles County.

== Career ==
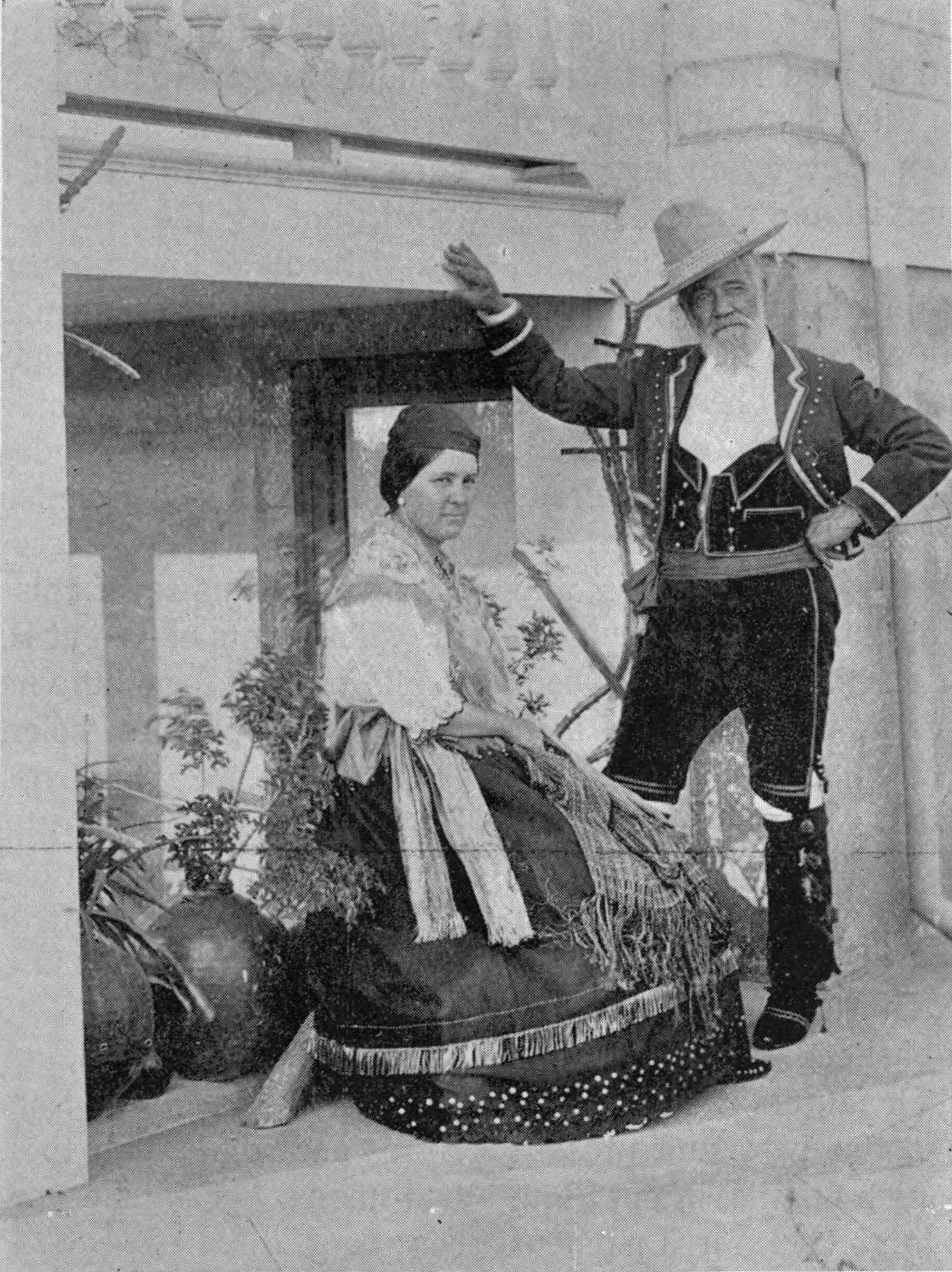
Portrait of Coronel and his wife, Mariana W. de Coronel, published in Overland Monthly, 1895

Antonio Francisco Coronel was the son of Ygnacio Coronel, born in Mexico City in the last years of colonial New Spain. Coronel was 17 years of age when he came to Alta California with his parents in 1834, as a part of the Híjar-Padrés Colony.

In 1838, he was appointed Assistant Secretary of Tribunals for the Pueblo de Los Ángeles. In 1843, he became Justice of the Peace (Juez de Paz, the equivalent of Mayor at that time). During the Mexican–American War in 1846–47, Antonio was a captain and sergeant-at-arms in the Mexican artillery and took part in military operations against the United States. Participating in the Battle of Dominguez Rancho, the Battle of Río San Gabriel and the Battle of La Mesa. He continued resistance under General José María Flores until Flores decided to leave California. Coronel and others then surrendered while Flores and a small remnant retreated to Sonora.

Once the war had ended, Antonio Coronel was the first Los Angeles County Assessor from 1850 to 1856. In 1853, Coronel became Mayor of Los Angeles. Coronel was a ward councilman on the Los Angeles Common Council (1854–1867)

He was the California State Treasurer from 1867 to 1871. In 1873, Coronel married Mariana Williamson.

Coronel collected indigenous artifacts from California and Mexico, and mission-era relics. After his death his widow donated them to the Chamber of Commerce which put them on display in an exhibit of Californiana in their downtown headquarters. Coronel's donated collection made the basis for the Natural History Museum of Los Angeles County. Antonio Coronel became the owner of Rancho Los Feliz.

== Personal life ==
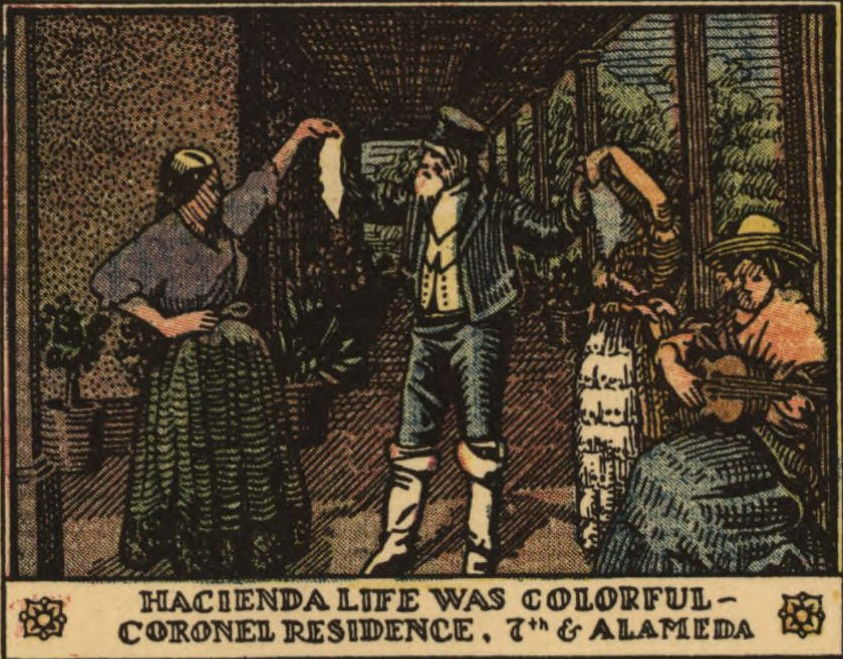
"Hacienda life was colorful, Coronel residence at 7th and Alameda," from Los Angeles, as it was in 1871 story map (1929)

He was married to Mariana W. de Coronel.

His brother, Manuel F. Coronel, was the first Zanjero of Los Angeles. He had a sister, Maria Antonio Coronel, who married Alexis Godey in 1863.

Political offices
Preceded by Romualdo Pacheco	State Treasurer of California; 1867–1871	Succeeded by Ferdinand Baehr
