= Zanja Madre =

Historic aqueduct in Los Angeles, California

Coordinates: 34°4′6.8″N 118°14′0″W

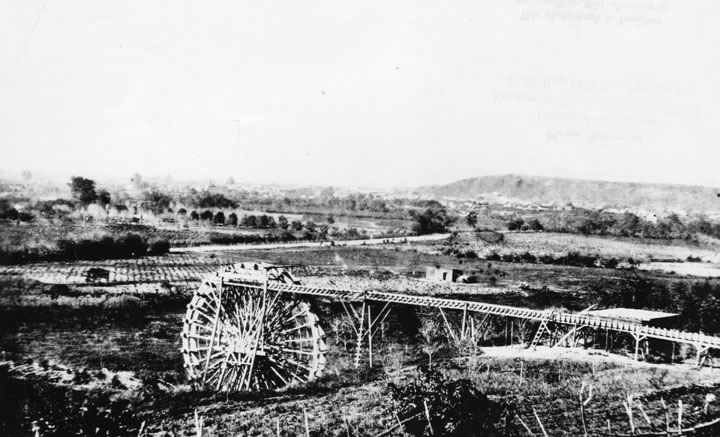
A water wheel on the Los Angeles River at start of Zanja Madre, 1863

The Zanja Madre (Spanish: [ˈsaŋxa ˈmaðɾe], "Mother Trench") is the original aqueduct that brought water to the Pueblo de Los Angeles from the Río Porciúncula (Los Angeles River). The original open, earthen ditch, or zanja was completed by community laborers within a month of founding the pueblo. (Note: The word zanjero was the 19th century title of a municipal worker who had charge of the water system in Los Angeles.) This water system was used for both domestic uses and irrigation to fields west of town. The main zanja ultimately fed eight branch zanjas. This availability of water was essential to the survival and growth of the community founded here. Brick conduits 3 to 3.5 feet (0.91 to 1.07 m) in diameter were built to improve the system after 1884. Eventually the system did not supply enough water to keep pace with population growth and irrigation demand. The system was abandoned by 1904 though portions were still used for storm water purposes. It was maintained by the Zanjero of Los Angeles.

== Origins ==
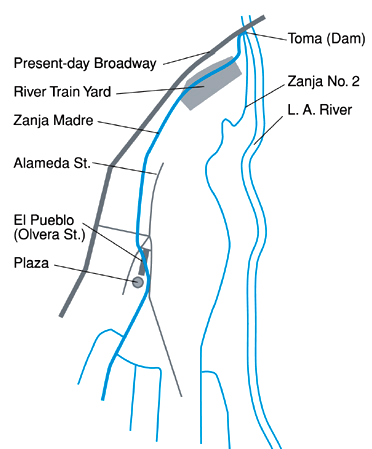
Overview of the Zanja Madre

The Pueblo de Los Angeles was an official settlement of Spain. They had three types of settlements in Alta California: presidio (military), mission (religious) and pueblo (civil). The pueblos would provide the commercial and agricultural needs of the military as an alternative to the missions. Governor Felipe de Neve took the assignment of creating this settlement very seriously and had elaborate plans drawn up outlining the details of its infrastructure. The plan included a governmental directive for the provision of water to be delivered to the settlement, stating, "there should be examined all the lands which may receive the benefit of irrigation, marking the place most proper to divert the water, so that it may be allotted to the largest portion of lands." It was also directed that the pueblo be placed on moderately elevated ground so that all the agricultural lands benefiting from the irrigation could be overlooked. This would mean that the supply head would have to be at yet higher ground.

The Zanja Madre was placed close to present-day Broadway at the foot of the Elysian Hills by the river. An earth and brush dam, called a toma, was created to pool up the water into the ditch which then ran along an elevated slope down to the pueblo after which it was split into multiple ditches which ran to the various portions of lowland. A large water wheel, constructed in the 1850s, took water up to the Zanja Madre and onto the main brick reservoir that was located in what is now the Plaza at the end of Olvera Street. The wheel was susceptible to damage from floods. The toma was washed away several times before a wooden one was built in its place. The Zanjero, or “water overseer,” was responsible for maintaining the system alongside a group of deputies. The earliest industrial use of the Zanja Madre by Eagle Flour Mills in 1855, according to archeologist Marc Beherec, and more heavy use followed. The year 1888 was when the Zanjas were the longest at 52 miles (84 km) within the city limits of Los Angeles.

== Later improvements ==
The soft, sandy tunnel collapsed several times and attempts were made to repair it with brick lining, but the whole aqueduct was abandoned in 1884 after a flood tore out the wooden dam. It had already been realized since 1878 that several improvements would have to be done to the zanja systems. Some of this included conversion of the smaller ditches to pipelines while larger areas would be concrete. After this last failure the earthen toma and open ditch were put back into service while more elaborate plans were being made.

In 1888 the city planned to put pipe in most of the existing zanjas, but budgetary shortfalls did not allow the work to be finished. The tunnel at the headwater of the Zanja Madre was reconstructed and much of the conduit was either brick or concrete lined. By 1893 there ended up some 50 miles (80 km) of zanjas in the city and another 40 miles (64 km) of zanjas outside the city limit. Over the years the portion of the Zanja Madre that passed around the north edge of the River Train Yard was realigned again and again until railroad construction eventually demolished most of the conduits as the city built newer types of water systems.

== Archaeological finds ==
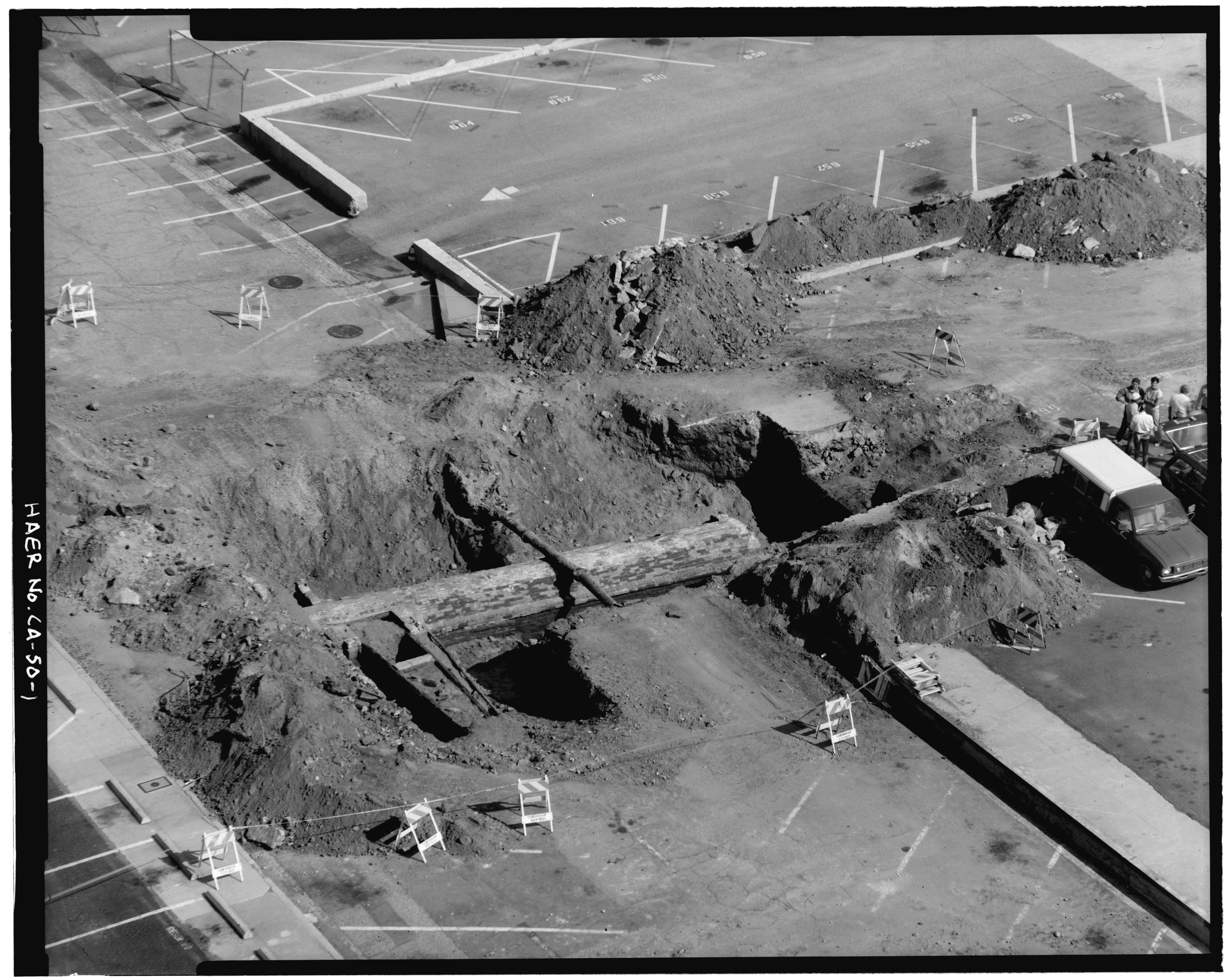
OVERHEAD SITE VIEW, LOOKING EAST - Zanja No. 3, Brick Culvert, Alameda Street between Temple and Aliso Streets

At least 18 segments of the Los Angeles Zanja system, including various portions of the Zanja Madre, have been documented as they have been uncovered during construction projects over the years. The resource was first formally documented by archaeologists in 1978 when archaeologist Julia Costello discovered a portion of the Zanja Madre during construction of the Plaza de Dolores.

In 2000 two people dug up a section of the Zanja on the steep slope near a Broadway parking garage and were credited by the L.A. Weekly and Los Angeles Times as having rediscovered the Zanja. Later, archaeologists overseeing site operations near the MTA Gold Line studied the portions of uncovered brick conduit. They expected to find more portions along the line near the River Yard, but there were no discoveries. It was generally supposed that the Zanja had been destroyed during railroad yard construction over the years. Since it was private property, no archaeological surveys were made.

In 2005 MTA construction crews uncovered unexpected sections of the brick Zanja Madre. Archaeologists were brought in to evaluate the finds, most of which were red-brick, penstock-sized aqueducts. Now serious studies and documentation have begun in order to have the Zanja Madre routes put onto historical registers.

In 2014 excavation for the foundation of the Blossom Plaza project on North Broadway discovered a 100-foot-long section (30 m). The careless and rushed removal of a 40-foot portion (12 m) of the Zanja Madre to allow the development to continue without delay has been criticized in the editorial pages of the Daily News and by KCET Departures. The brick section was destroyed when moved.

At least three exposed segments of the Zanja Madre survive on publicly owned land. They include a segment owned by Los Angeles County and located next to the Gold Line tracks adjacent to Los Angeles State Historic Park, and two City-owned segments located within buildings at Pueblo de Los Angeles Historical Monument.

A leather book with a hand-drawn map from the city survey records dated to 1887 identifies the location where newly unearthed brick and mortar pipe was found according to the City Surveyor, Tony Pratt.

== Gallery ==
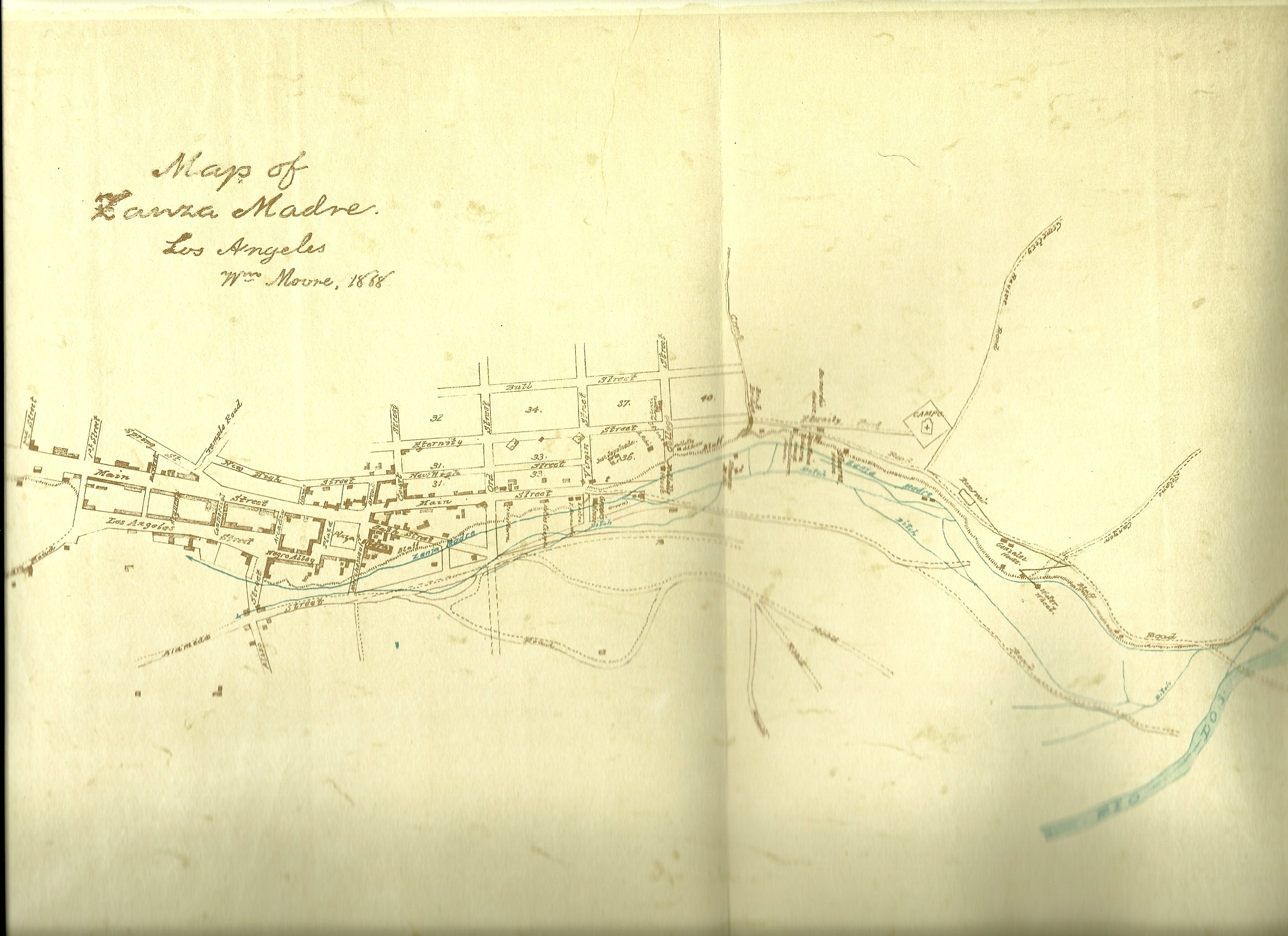
1888 map of the Zanja Madre

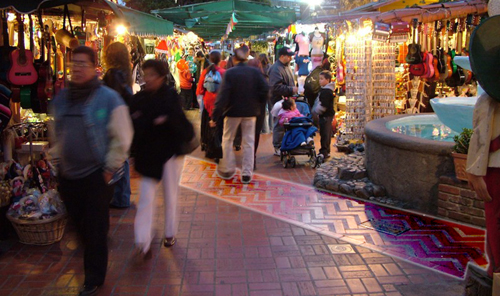
Photo of Olvera Street with enhancement of the brickwork showing the course of the Zanja Madre through the pueblo. The fountain next to the brickwork was constructed by Christine Sterling "in memory of this very important stream of water which gave life to the growing things of the pueblo”.

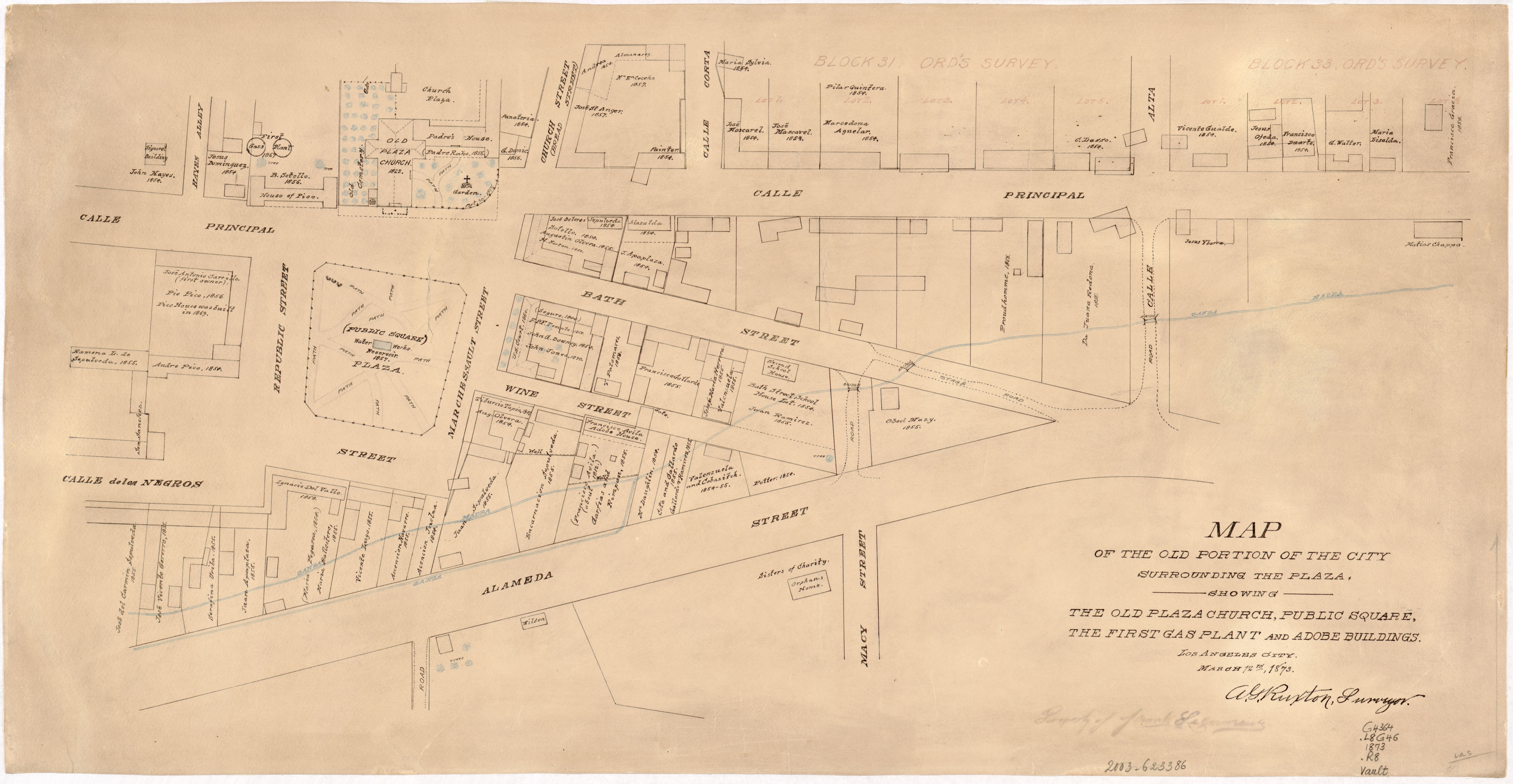
1873 map of the Plaza, including course of Zanja Madre

== See also ==
- Acequia
- Avila Adobe
- California Water Wars
- History of Los Angeles
- Los Angeles State Historic Park — northern section's site.
- Los Angeles Aqueduct
- MacArthur Park
- Olvera Street
- Rill
- Acequia Madre de Valero (San Antonio)
- Acequia Madre (Santa Fe)
- Acequia Madre (Las Vegas, New Mexico)
