= Ygnacio Coronel =

American politician (1795–1862)

Ygnacio Coronel (1795–1862) was a settler in the Pueblo de Los Ángeles of Mexican Alta California. He was a member of the Los Angeles Common Council.

== Life ==
Jose Ygnacio Franco Coronel was born in Mexico City, during the colonial New Spain period. He joined the Spanish army and by 1814 rose to the rank of corporal of the cavalry. He married Maria Josefa Francisca Romero (1802 –1871), a native of Toluca.

In 1834, as a part of the Híjar-Padrés Colony, Ygnacio brought his family (two sons, Antonio F. Coronel and Manuel F. Coronel, four daughters, and his nephew Agustín Olvera) to Alta California, where he started a new life as a civilian. Ygnacio Coronel was a schoolmaster. His son, Antonio, married Mariana W. de Coronel.

In 1836, Coronel was appointed commissioner of the secularized Mission San Miguel Arcángel. In 1837 he taught in the Pueblo de Los Angeles, and afterwards he was secretary of the Ayuntamiento (Los Angeles City Council). In 1843 he was granted Rancho La Cañada.

Ygnacio Coronel died in 1862, after the U.S. statehood of California in 1850.
