= Mariana W. de Coronel =

American socialite (1851–1925)

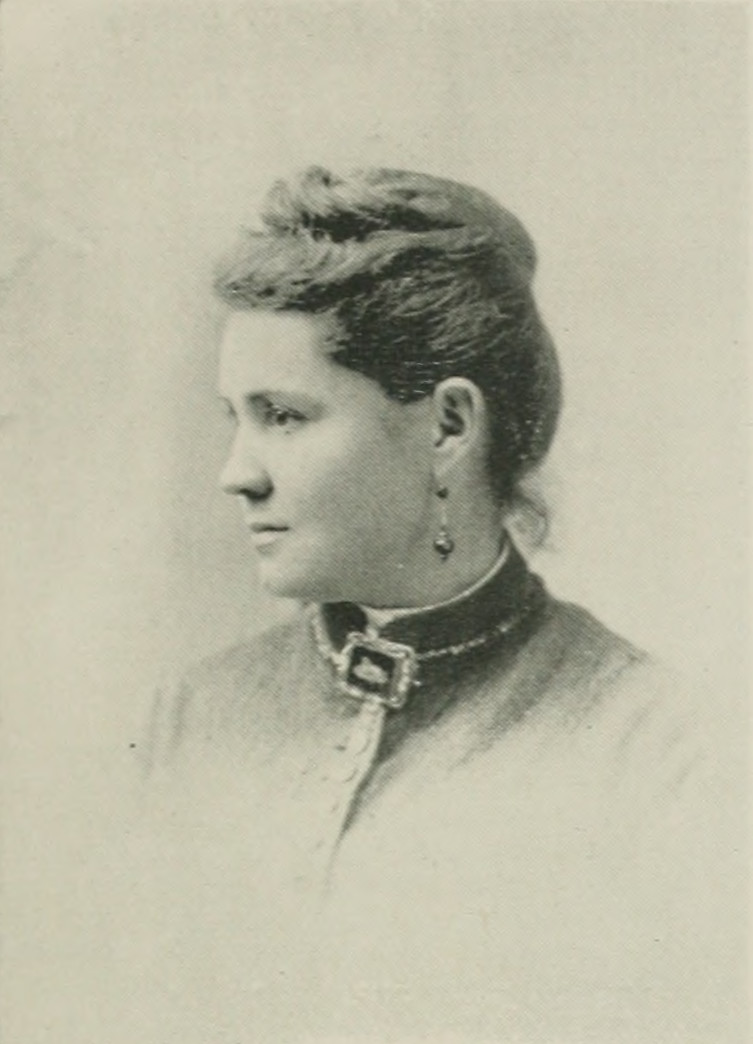
- Born: Mary Burton Williamson; February 26, 1851; San Antonio, Texas, U.S.
- Died: Los Angeles, California, U.S.
- Other name: Mariana Coronel de Dominguez
- Occupations: Collector of Native American and Mexican curios
- Organizations: Indian Rights Association, Southern California Historical Society, Ladies' Aid Society, Children's Home Society, Society of Los Angeles Pioneers
- Known for: Historic collection of Native American and Mexican artifacts
- Spouse(s): Antonio F. Coronel (m. 1873–1894), C. Edgar Smith (m. 1895–2026)

Mariana W. de Coronel (February 26, 1851 – 1925) was an American collector of Native American and Mexican curios and antiques. These were gathered during the course of many years, the largest and most valuable collection of historical materials of its kind in the United States.

== Early years ==
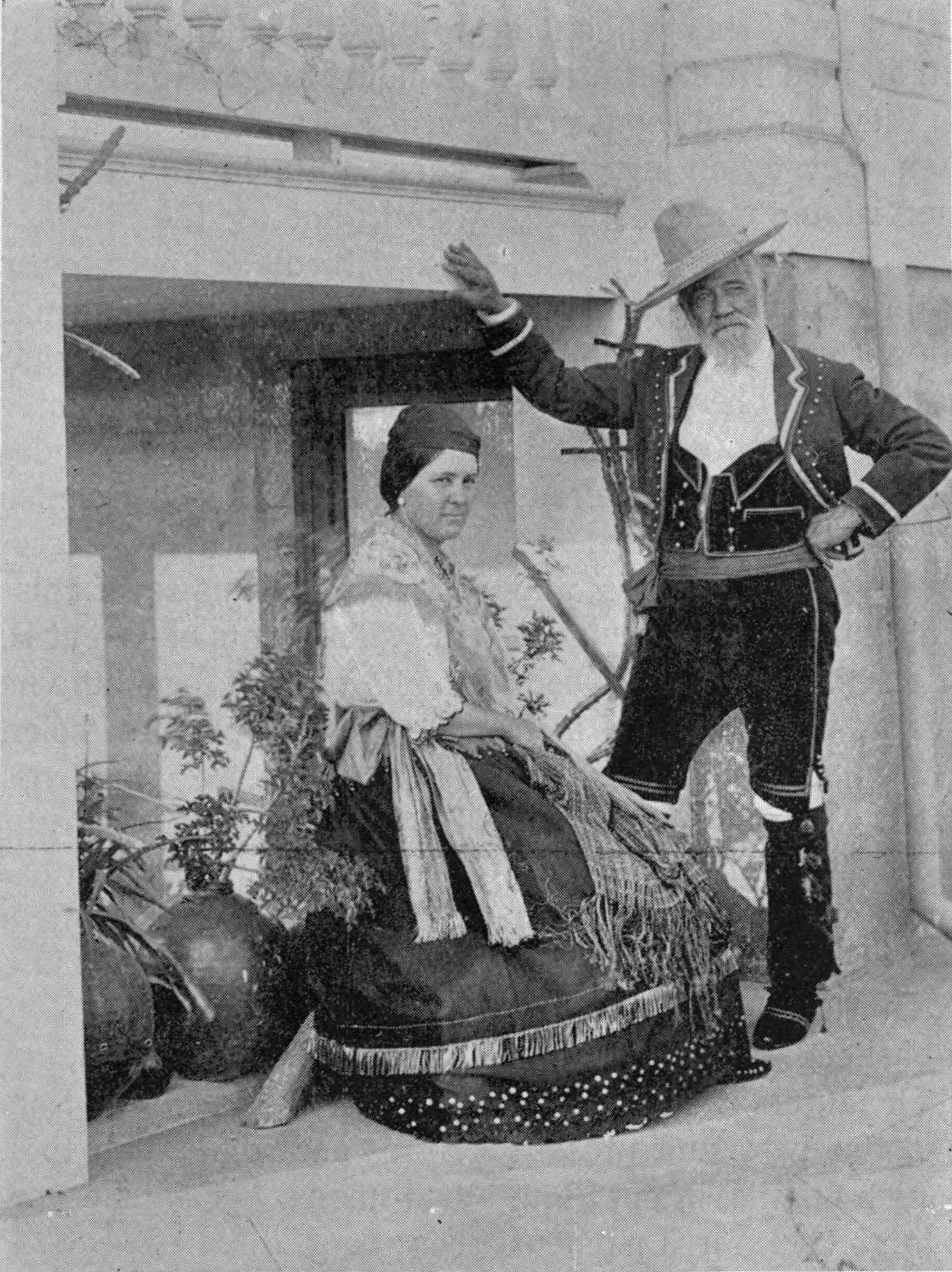
Mariana and Antonio Coronel

Mary "Mariana" Burton Williamson was born in San Antonio, Texas, on February 26, 1851, the oldest of a family of six children. Her father, Nelson Williamson, was a New Englander from Maine. Her mother, Gertrude (Roman) Williamson, was a woman of Spanish descent, “a Mexicano Tejano woman from Los Brazos River area.”

The Williamsons were among the earliest emigrants to the United States, and were noted for patriotism as well as for longevity, both of Coronel's grandfathers having survived to the age 104 years. One of them, John Williamson, a soldier as well as a Christian minister, was a cousin of Hugh Williamson of North Carolina. The family removed to Cincinnati, where Coronel's grandfather founded a college, the first in the place. Her father engaged in carrying the mail between Cincinnati and Chicago, and was the first long-distance messenger employed. Later, he became first-mate on the first steamboat which made a trip down the Ohio River. In 1837, he went to Texas, and for some time served as a Texas Ranger under Gen. Zachary Taylor. He served in the battles of Vera Cruz, Palo Alto, Buena Vista, Cerro Gordo, Cherubusco, Chapultepec, San Pascua and Tobasco. After the war, he settled in San Antonio, where he engaged in contracting and building, and also held the office of judge. The discovery of gold became the impetus for the family's move to California. Arriving in Los Angeles in the latter part of 1859, when Mariana was eight, Mr. Williamson engaged in the real estate and mercantile business. Her siblings included Elena, Roberto Owens, Antoina Jefferson, Louisa, and Gertrude.

== Career ==
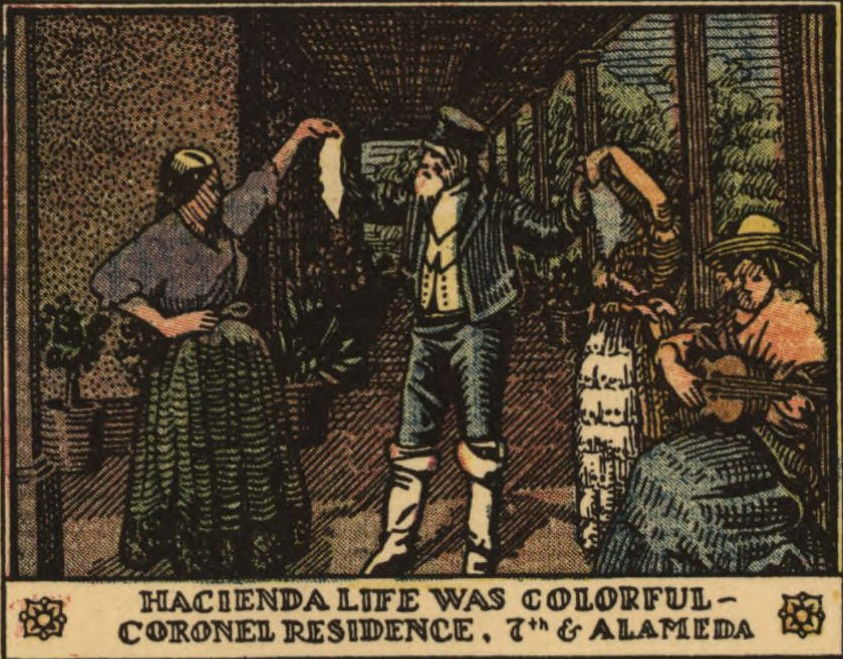
"Hacienda life was colorful, Coronel residence at 7th and Alameda," from Los Angeles, as it was in 1871 story map (1929)

In 1873, she married Don Antonio F. Coronel (1817–1894), a Californio, and one of the most prominent participants in the early history of Los Angeles, having served as the city's Mayor, as well as State Treasurer. For many years, by travel in Mexico and California, and by correspondence, the husband and wife collected Native American and Mexican curiosities, developing one of the best private collections in Los Angeles. Having from infancy been familiar with the English and Spanish languages, Coronel spoke them with equal fluency, and her knowledge of both aided her materially while collecting her curios. The collection included the carefully preserved school books used in the pioneer school established in Los Angeles by her father-in-law, Ygnacio Coronel.

The Coronels were deeply interested in the Mission Indians of California, having joined with their friend, Helen Hunt Jackson, in aiding this group. It was at the suggestion of Coronel that Jackson made the Rancho Camulos hacienda the scene of action of her Ramona novel. In 1887, the Coronels visited Mexico City, and in 1893, they went to the World's Fair at Chicago, where their stay was cut short by Antonio's illness, and subsequent death the following year.

After Antonio's death, Coronel superintended the estate, which included valuable property in Los Angeles and a ranch of 650 acres (260 ha) at Whittier, besides important mining interests in Aliso Canon and Oaxaca, Mexico. She presented the collection they had emmassed to the city of Los Angeles, and it went on exhibit in the Chamber of Commerce. Since 1961, the collection has been held by the Natural History Museum of Los Angeles County.

She again married, December 28, 1895, to Dr. C. Edgar Smith of Los Angeles, thereafter being known as Mrs. de Smith. They divorced five years later. Later photographs dating to 1913 refer to “Mariana Coronel de Dominguez”, which may be evidence of a third marriage. She died in 1925. Among the numerous organizations with which she was actively connected were the Indians Rights Association, the Southern California Historical Society, Ladies' Aid Society, Children's Home Society, Society of Los Angeles Pioneers, and others.
