= H. C. Cardwell =

American politician (1819–1859)

Hemen "H. C." Cardwell (c. 1819 – 1859) was a pioneer settler in California who served in the Mexican–American War, served as Zanjero of Los Angeles, was a major contributor to early California business and agriculture, and served in the first California State Assembly in 1849–1850.

== Personal ==
Cardwell was born in Vermont but moved to Steuben County, New York, in his early years. In January, 1841 he left home on a whaling voyage. After visiting many ports of the Pacific, he arrived in California in 1844, and for some time was a resident of Los Angeles.

Cardwell married Maria Susana Wolfskill, daughter of Los Angeles rancher and agronomist William Wolfskill in 1853. He constructed a new house on land adjoining the Wolfskill property in 1858. H. C. and Susana had four children: a daughter, Ellen, who died July 21, 1854, at the age of 1; William, born January 28, 1855, Charles, born February 17, 1857; and Leonora, born in September 1859—two months after Cardwell's death. Charles died in February 1859.

Cardwell was approximately 40 years of age when he died on July 4, 1859. According to his obituary, "In 1850, he was thrown from a horse, and received injuries from which he never recovered." The U.S. Census Mortality Schedule ending June 1860 listed his cause of death as consumption, indicating that he had suffered from the disease for a period of one year. "His sufferings for a number of years have been great, but he has always displayed a most unconquerable spirit of energy and perseverence [sic]."

== Military service ==
During the Mexican–American War, Cardwell was one of the hundreds of volunteers who joined John Fremont's California Battalion, serving under Captain Bell. Cardwell participated in the Battle of Rio San Gabriel at the Rancho Paso de Bartolo and the Battle of La Mesa in January 1847.

== California's First State Assembly ==
Following the Mexican–American War, the Gold Rush of 1849 took Cardwell to Sacramento, where he was a partner in the business of Cardwell, Brown & Co. on J Street, between 2nd and 3rd Streets. There is evidence that he had a minor acting career, as well. His business acumen, together with his military service, led to his election to the very first California State Assembly, headquartered in San Jose, California, in late 1849. He introduced a joint resolution in relation to the pay of judges of the Supreme Court of California.

== Civic service ==
After his term in the assembly, Cardwell moved to Los Angeles and worked as a clerk at William Wolfskill's ranch. He later served the city as Zanjero of Los Angeles in 1854–1855. His good name was used to endorse political candidates and professionals.

== Early California agriculture ==
Cardwell made several important contributions to early California agriculture. As an employee and later son-in-law of William Wolfskill, Cardwell helped cultivate and farm vast ranchos in the Los Angeles area. He grew oranges, grapes, peaches, pears, apples and olives. As early as 1853, Cardwell was shipping thousands of pounds of produce via the Port of San Pedro. He successfully planted chestnut trees and was somewhat of a legend for his "mammoth" 21.5 pound sweet potatoes. He is credited with introducing "heretofore unknown" seedling strawberries to southern California in January 1856. He had a reputation for experimenting with and improving crops in southern California.
