= Zanja =

Historical irrigation system used in the American Southwest

Etymology From Andalusian Arabic al-jandaq (Ex; Battle of Al-khandaq/Al-jandaq,"the trench", known as Battle of Simancas to Christian forces, took place in 939 CE). From Persian kandaq, meaning dug or excavated.

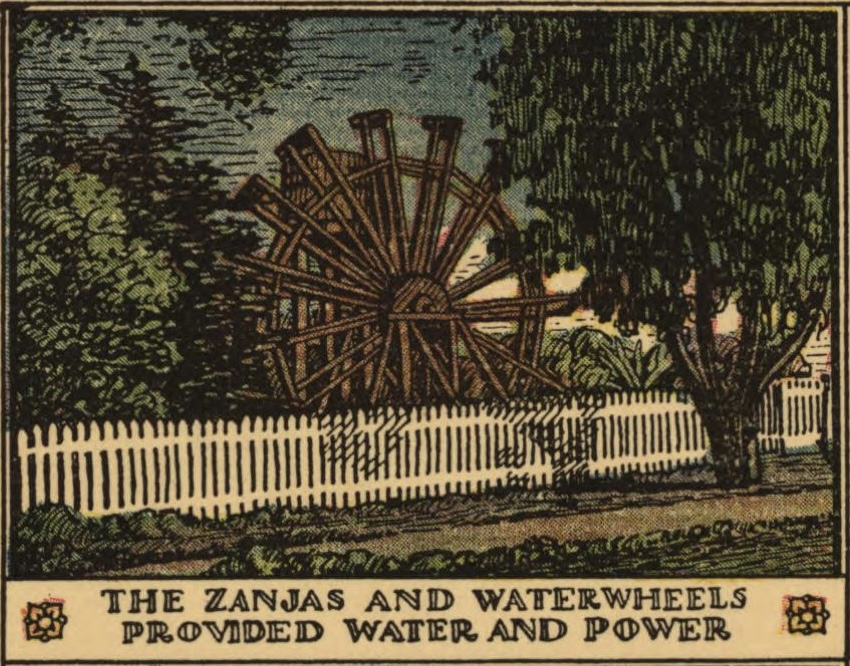
"Zanjas and waterwheels provided water and power" from Los Angeles as it appeared in 1871, a story map published 1929 (Library of Congress)

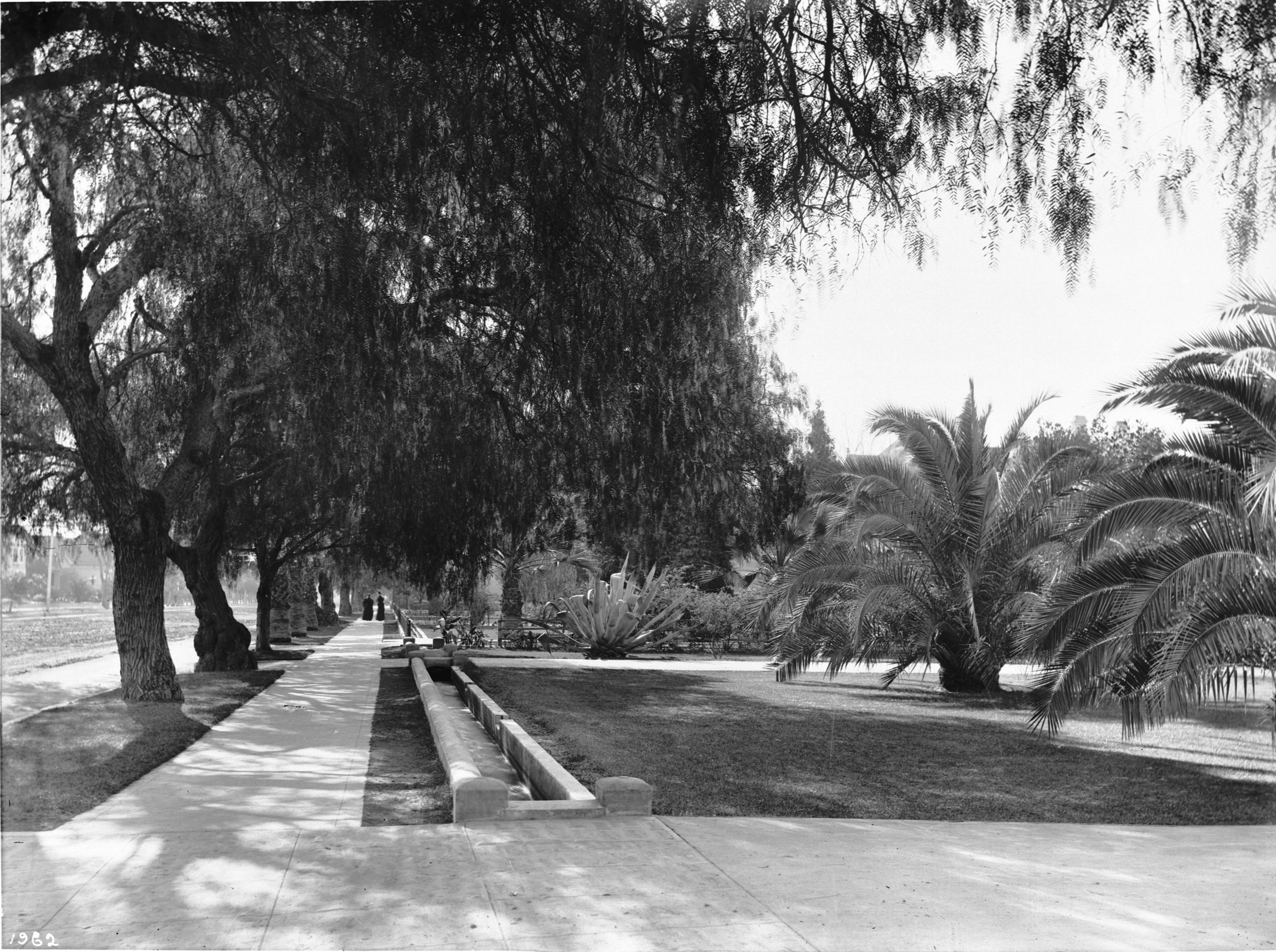
Figueroa Street zanja, 1906 (California Historical Society)

A zanja ([ˈsaŋxa], "water ditch" or "trench") is an archaic irrigation system used in the southwestern United States and that still occurs in various place names as a relic of that time. An acequia is a more highly engineered zanja, able to carry water for longer distances. In some places, sections of a zanja/acequia would be elevated as in an aqueduct. Preserved sections of the Mission Santa Barbara water system demonstrate all three variations.

Variant spellings that appear in North American English placenames and documents include zanjón, zanjon, san jon, and sanjon.

Historian Leonard Pitt wrote in 1997 that the zanja system was "Introduced [to Los Angeles] by Spanish pobladores in 1781, [and] the zanja technology was expanded into a network and used for irrigation and domestic needs even in the early Yankee period. Water was diverted from the riverbed by a brush weir (toma) into a main channel, called the mother ditch (zanja madre). It was then allowed to spread at ground level to other branch channels.”

"Proto-modern water mains" pipeline systems were introduced to Los Angeles in the mid-19th century but the zanja system persisted in parallel for decades.

Pasadena's Zanja was built “in 1877 by Benjamin Eaton, [and] brought water from the Arroyo Seco to the citrus groves of early Pasadena.” Residual elements of the zanja can still be seen in the area.

Some zanjas were on individual ranchos or farms rather than serving whole cities.

The person in charge of maintaining the zanja was called the zanjero; this job title is still in use in at least one water district in Arizona.

In 2008, the Los Angeles Times reported on the remaining few zanjeros:

Romo is a zanjero—pronounced sahn-HAIR-o—Spanish for overseer of the mother ditch. His job is to deliver prescribed amounts of Colorado River water to farmers served by the Imperial Irrigation District in southeastern California. It's a job rich in tradition, one that mirrors the settlement of the West and its complicated relationship with water ... The zanjero was once the most powerful man in any community, entrusted with overseeing its most valuable resource. In early Los Angeles, he was paid more than the mayor. Long before he engineered the city's future, William Mulholland learned the nuances of water working as a zanjero.

Different regions worked differently, but in 19th-century Los Angeles, "On the 24th of the month, the party desiring to irrigate goes to the Zanjero's office and files a written application for water, pays his money, gets his ticket, and the first convenient date is assigned to him."

== Place names ==
- Zanjero Park, Gilbert, Arizona
- San Jon, New Mexico
- Sanjon Street, Ventura, California
- Zanja Street, Venice, California
- Zanja Street, Pasadena, California
- Zanja Peak Trailhead, Yucaipa
- Zanja Lane, West Hills, Los Angeles
- La Zanja Drive, Glendale, California

== Additional images ==
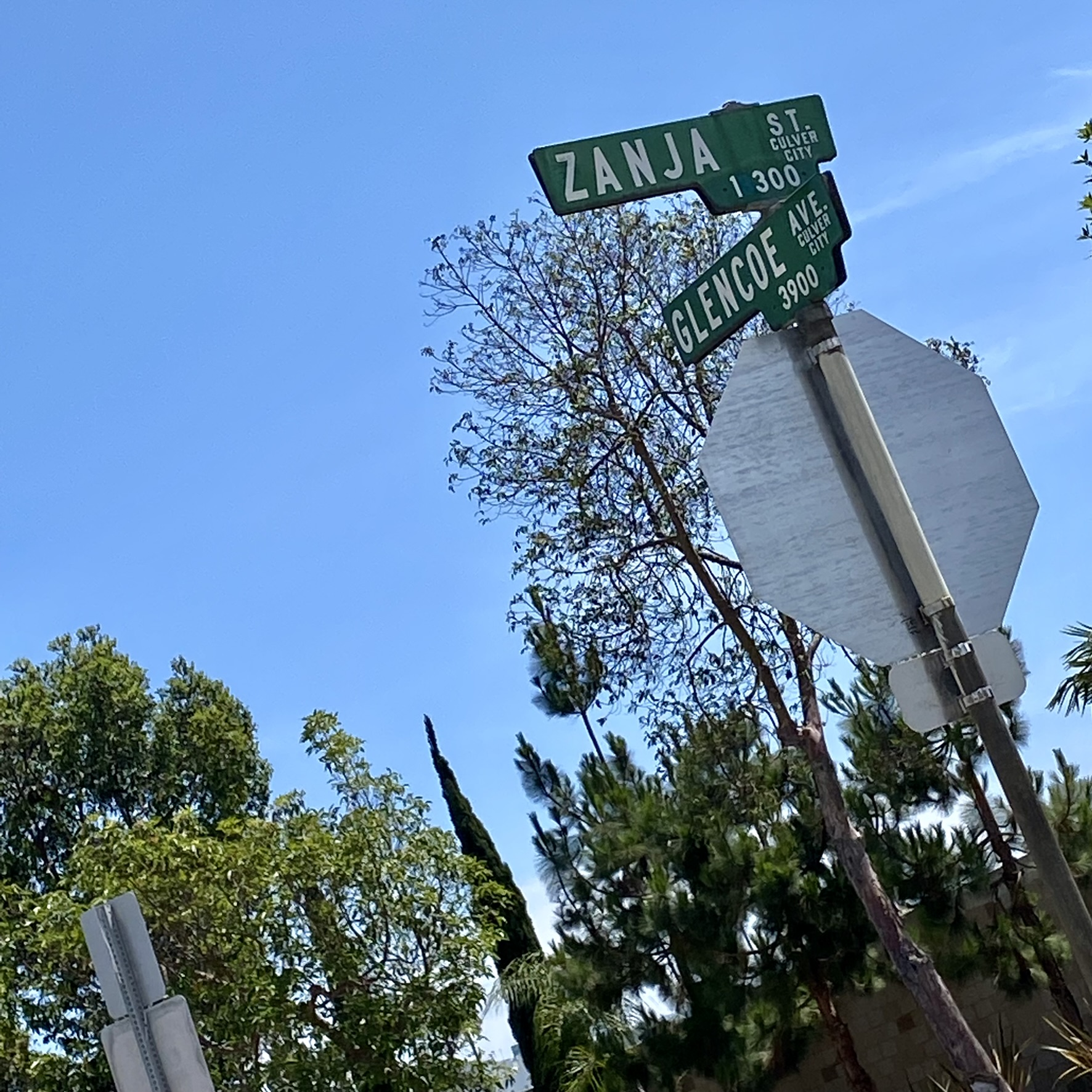
Zanja Street in Venice, Los Angeles, and Culver City

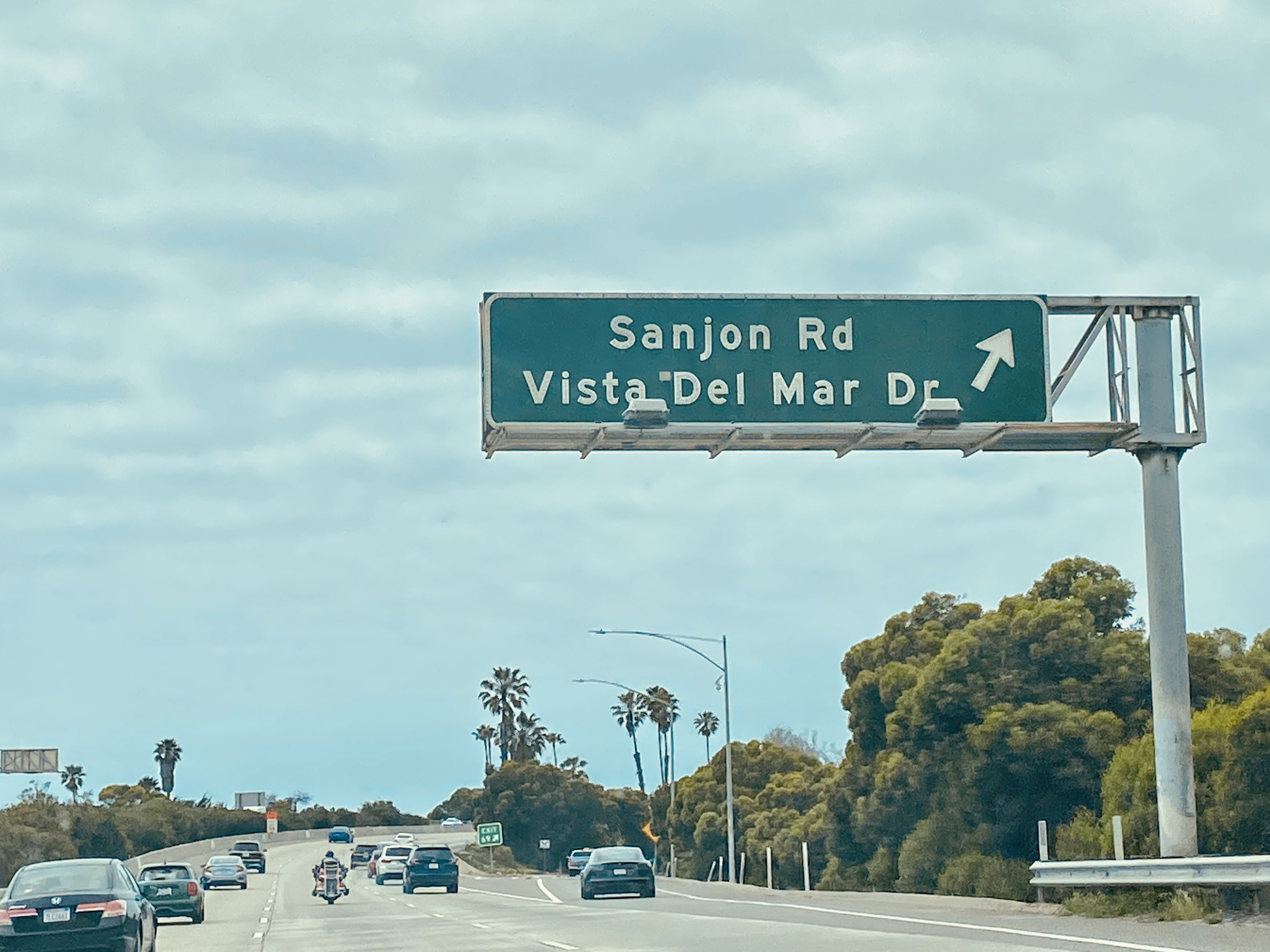
Sanjon Road exit off the 101 in Ventura County

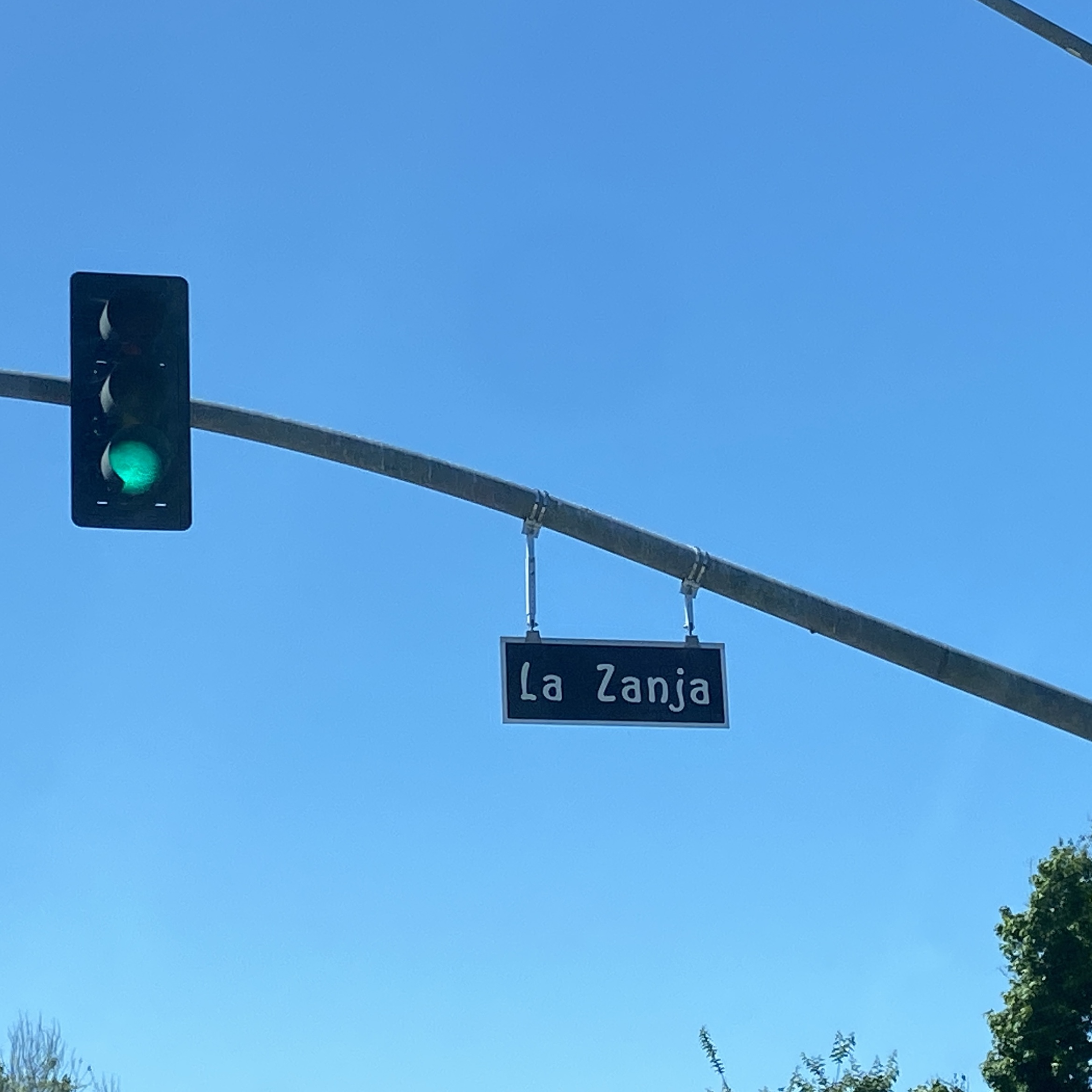
La Zanja Street, San Juan Capistrano, California

== See also ==
- Zanja Madre
- Mill Creek Zanja
- Zanjero of Los Angeles
- Rancho Sanjon de los Moquelumnes
