= Manuel F. Coronel =

American politician

Member of the California Assembly
- In office 1869–1871

1st Zanjero of Los Angeles
- In office 1854–1854

Manuel F. Coronel was a Californio politician, who served in the California State Assembly and as the first official Zanjero of Los Angeles (water steward). served as a member of the 1869–1871 California State Assembly, representing the 2nd District.

== Life ==
He was the son of Ygnacio Coronel. His brother is Antonio F. Coronel, who served as Mayor of Los Angeles and California State Treasurer.

He was the first one appointed as Zanjero of Los Angeles (water steward) on April 3, 1854, but he resigned just two weeks later.

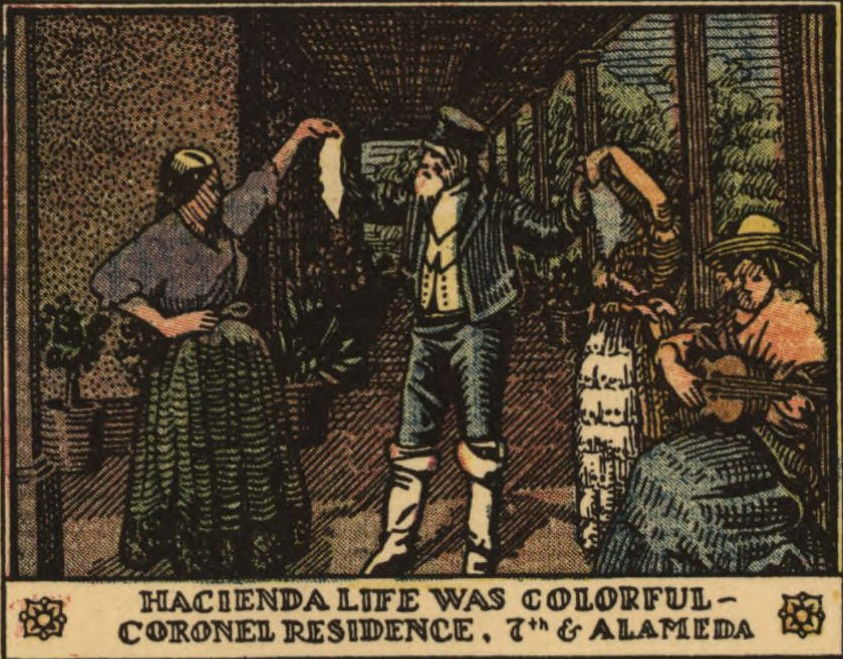
"Hacienda life was colorful, Coronel residence at 7th and Alameda," from Los Angeles, as it was in 1871 story map (1929)
