= Zanjero of Los Angeles =

Official in charge of water management

- Inaugural holder: Manuel F. Coronel
- Formation: 3 April 1854

The Zanjero (Spanish: [saŋˈxeɾo]; English: /zɑːnˈhɛroʊ/), sometimes known as the Water Overseer or Water Steward, was the official in charge of water management for the city of Los Angeles in the 19th century. The position was considered to be more important than even the Mayor of Los Angeles during the city's rapid expansion in the mid-1800s, earning the highest salary of any official for many years.

== Name ==
The title of Zanjero is a Spanish word, meaning someone who maintains a zanja (water trench). The position originally involved the maintenance and management of the trenches, such as Zanja Madre, which brought Los Angeles its water. As the city expanded, the position expanded to involve the management of larger water projects for Los Angeles.

== List of zanjeros ==
There was a high degree of turnover in the position. Manuel F. Coronel was the first one appointed as Water Overseer on April 3, 1854. However, he resigned just two weeks later. His successor served only four months before he resigned.

Former overseers include:

- Manuel F. Coronel
- Cristobal Aguilar
- William P. Meinzer
- H. C. Cardwell
- James H. Easton
- Charles Pleasant
- Damien Marchessault
- Elijah Bettis
- Oliver Stearns
- Jesus Cruz
- Eduljee Sorabjee
