= Spanish colonial pueblos and villas in North America =

Civilian settlements of New Spain

Historical map of Spanish North America

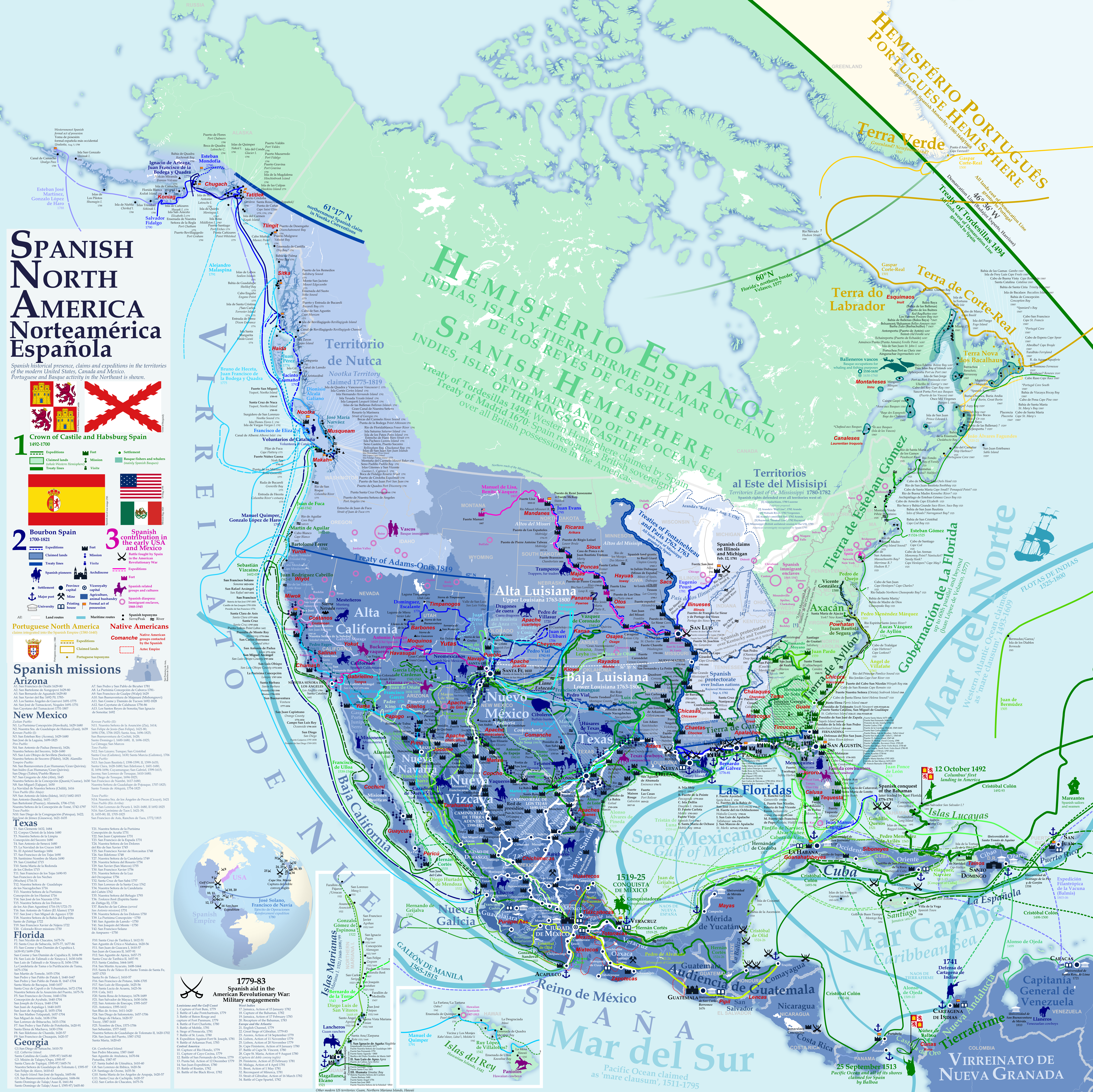
Traces of all history

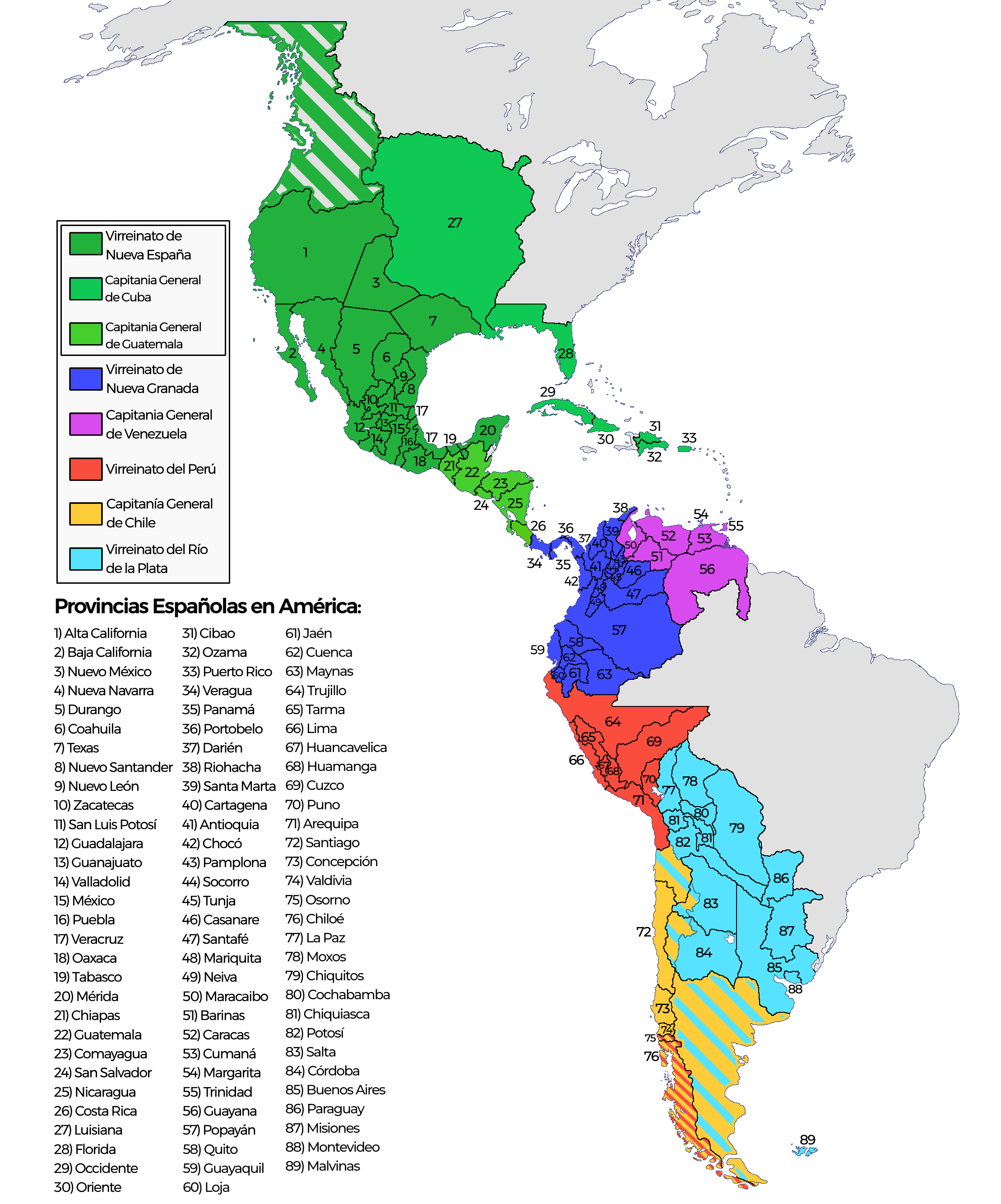
c. 1800

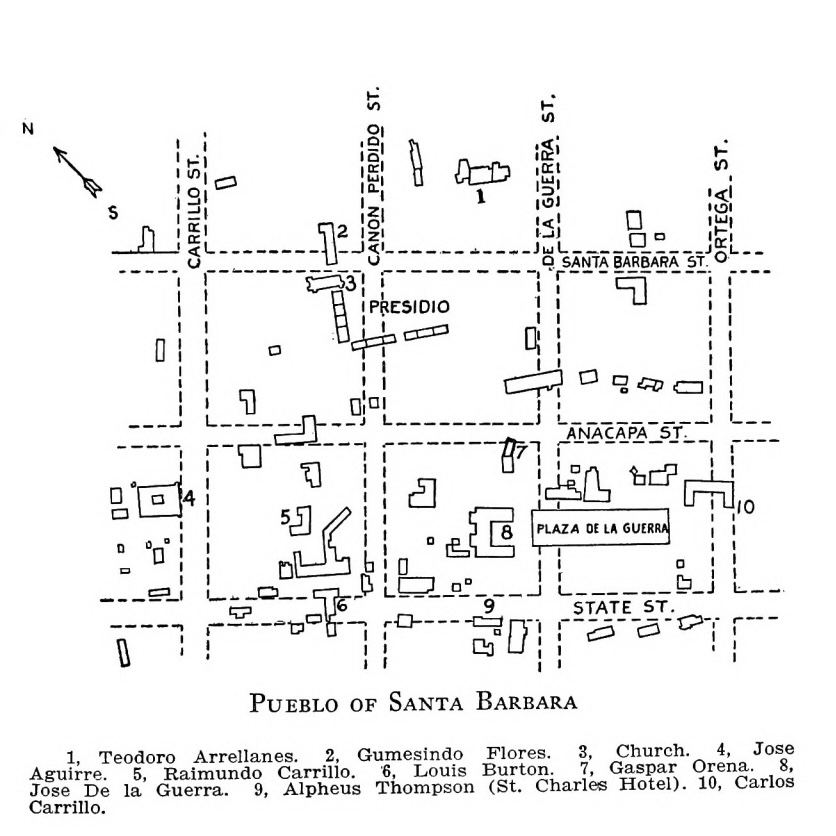
Diagram of Pueblo of Santa Barbara, California (Walter A. Hawley, 1910)

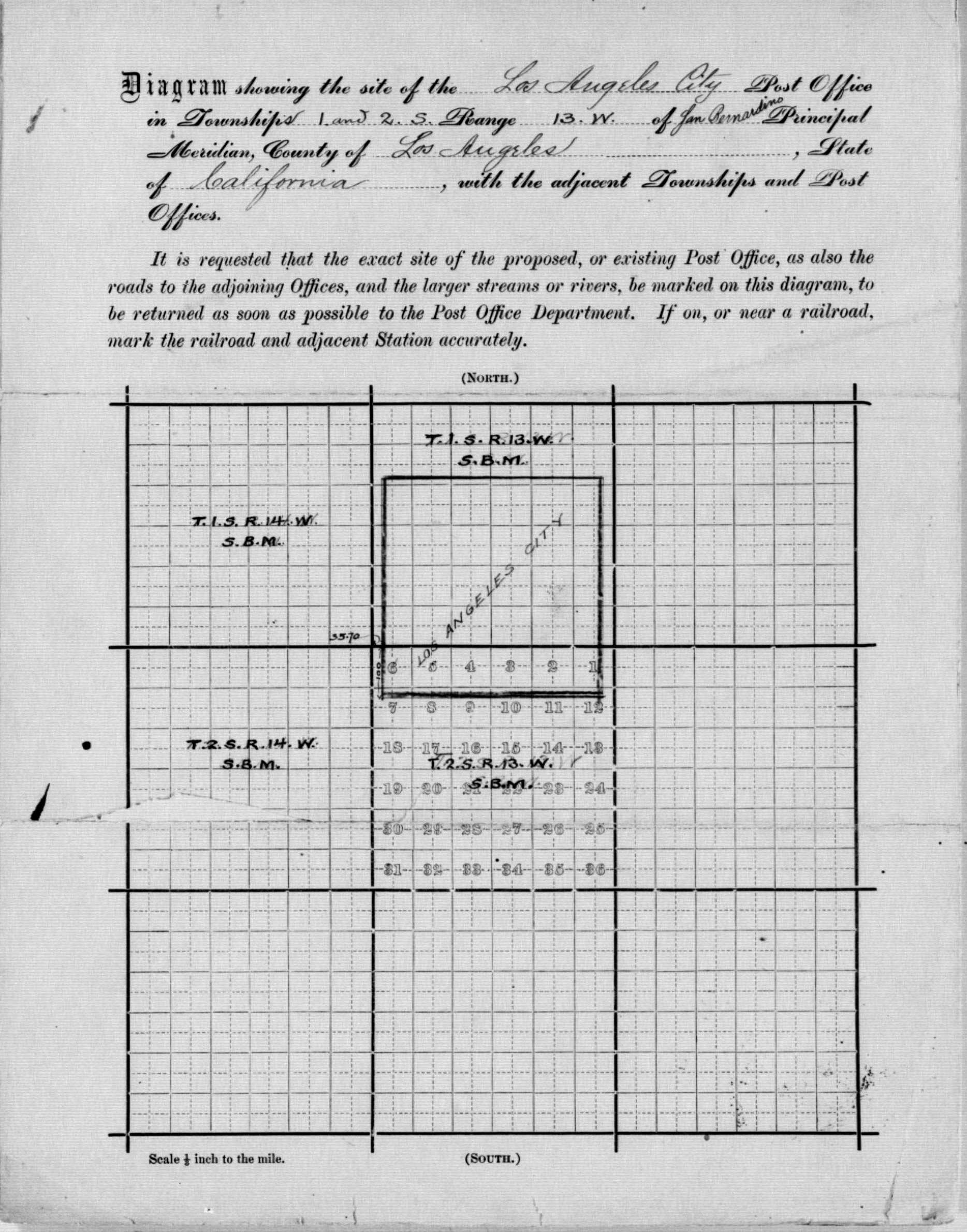
U.S. post office application from 1866 shows the four square Spanish leagues of the pre-statehood Los Angeles Pueblo

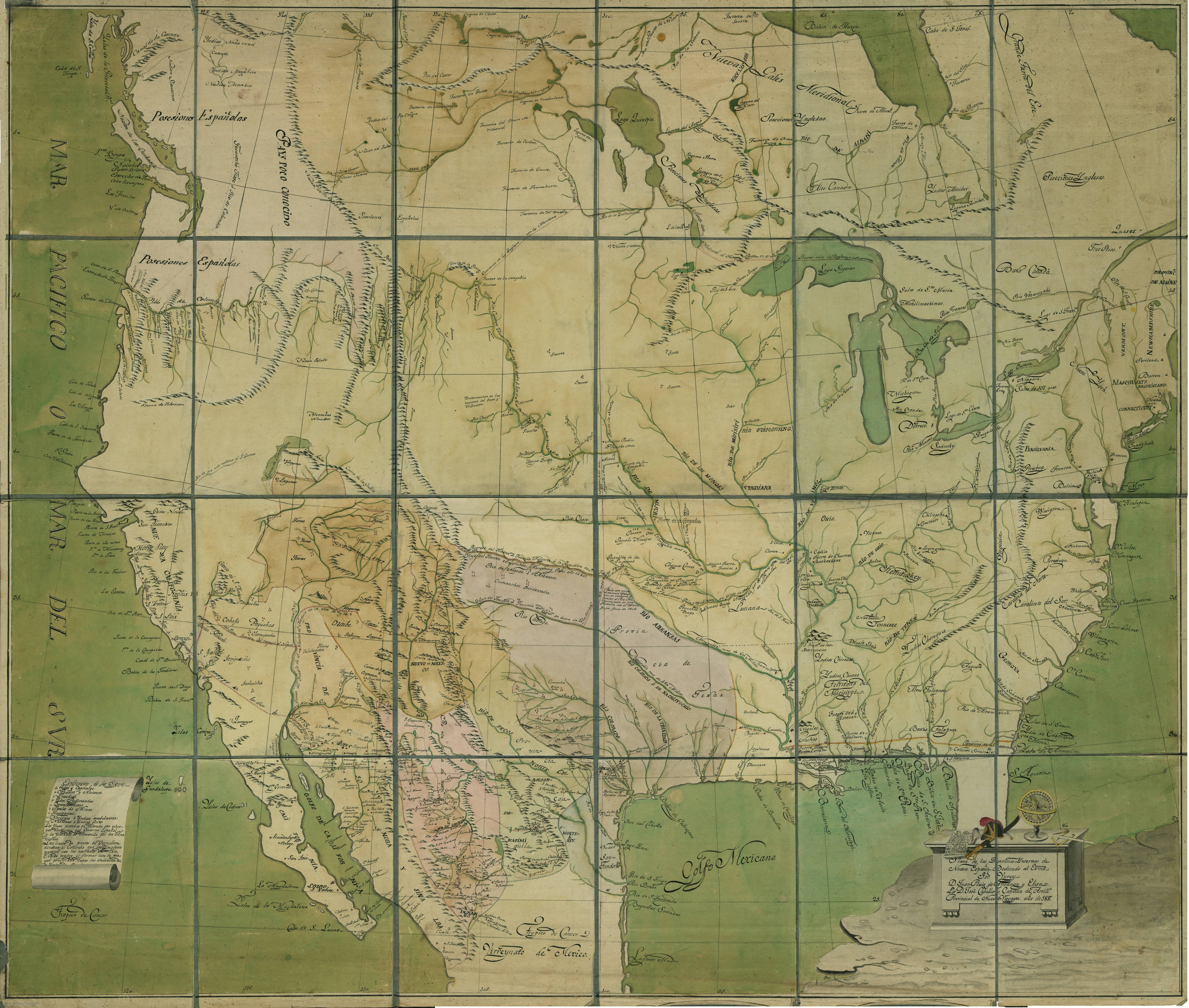
Provincias Ynternas de Nueva España mapped in 1817

Spanish colonial authorities in North America established misiones (churches with attached farms), presidios (military forts), and villa or pueblos (civilian settlements with residences, retail businesses, agricultural markets, etc.). Official pueblo establishments (as opposed to those that developed organically) were granted four square Spanish leagues of land and were required to be sited at least five Spanish leagues away from any other pueblo. According to one Arizona history, "Each organized pueblo was to have at least thirty inhabitants, each one to have ten breeding cows, four oxen, one brood mare, one sow, twenty Castilian ewes, six hens and one cock. House lots and sowing lands were to be distributed among pueblo settlers." Among the leadership of a pueblo was an alcalde (preceded in the history of Spanish administration by the title corregidor).

Spanish colonial pueblos in North America included:

- Villa of Santa Cruz de la Cañada, now Santa Cruz, New Mexico
- La Villa de San Francisco Xavier de Alburquerque, New Mexico - see History of Albuquerque, New Mexico § Founding of Alburquerque
- La Villa Real de la Santa Fe de San Francisco de Asís, New Mexico - see Santa Fe, New Mexico and Santa Fe de Nuevo México
- Villa el Paso del Norte at today's Ciudad Juárez, Chihuahua and El Paso, Texas
- Villa de Branciforte, in Santa Cruz County, California
- Pueblo de Los Ángeles in Los Angeles County, California, founded in 1781; land patented August 4, 1875, to the City of Los Angeles; containing 17,172.37 acres.
- Pueblo de San José de Guadalupe in Santa Clara County, California, founded November 27, 1777; patented July 4, 1884, to the City of San Jose; containing 55,891.77 acres
- Pueblo at Yerba Buena, California, adjacent to Mission San Francisco de Asís and Presidio of San Francisco in Alta California
- Pueblo de Sonoma in Sonoma County, California, founded in 1835 by the Mexican government; patented March 31, 1880, to the City of Sonoma; containing 6,063.95 acres - see Sonoma State Historic Park
- Villa de Béjar or Villa de Bexar in Spanish Texas, see History of San Antonio, Presidio San Antonio de Béxar
- Pueblo of Santa Barbara, California

== See also ==
- Hacienda – Spanish word used to refer to estates with large business enterprises
- Estancia – Large, private plot of land used for farming or cattle-raising
- Spanish missions in the Americas
- Spanish period in Arizona
- Land grants in New Mexico
- Ranchos in California
- Spanish colonization of the Americas
  - Viceroyalty of New Spain
    - Provincias Internas
