= Pueblo de Los Ángeles =

Spanish colonial pueblo; predecessor to the city of Los Angeles

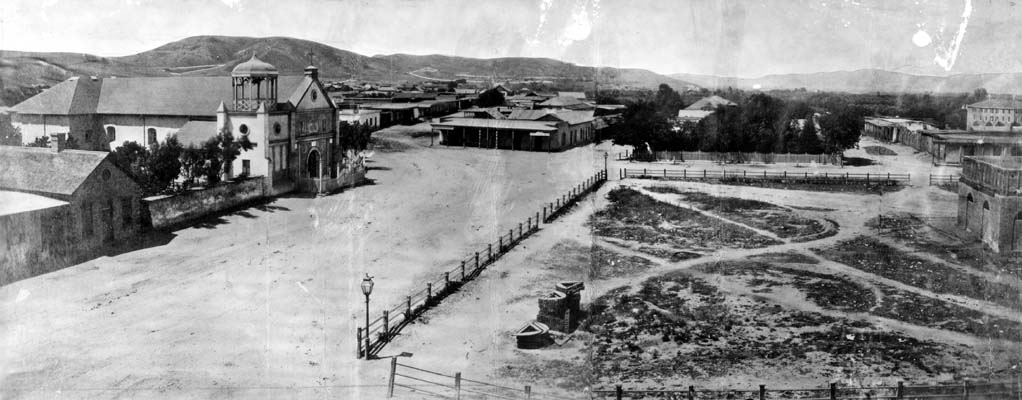
La Plaza, as seen from the Pico House, c. 1869. The "Old Plaza Church" is to the left, the brick reservoir on the right, and in the center of the plaza, was the original terminus of the Zanja Madre aqueduct.

El Pueblo de Nuestra Señora la Reina de los Ángeles del Río de Porciúncula (Spanish for "the Town of Our Lady, the Queen of the Angels, of the Porciúncula River"), shortened to the Pueblo de los Ángeles ("town of the angels"), was the Spanish civilian pueblo settled in 1781 which became the modern American metropolis of Los Angeles. The pueblo was built using labor from the adjacent village of Yaanga and was totally dependent on local Indigenous labor for its survival.

Official settlements in Alta California were of three types: presidio (military), mission (religious) and pueblo (civil). The Pueblo de los Ángeles was the second pueblo (town) created during the Spanish colonization of California (the first was San Jose, in 1777). El Pueblo de la Reina de los Ángeles—'The Town of the Queen of Angels' was founded twelve years after the first presidio and mission, the Presidio of San Diego and Mission San Diego de Alcalá (1769). The original settlement consisted of forty-four people in eleven families, recruited mostly from Estado de Occidente. As new settlers arrived and soldiers retired to civilian life in Los Angeles, the town became the principal urban center of southern Alta California, whose social and economic life revolved around the raising of livestock on the expansive ranchos.

== Founding ==
In 1542 Juan Rodríguez Cabrillo, with a commission from Viceroy Antonio de Mendoza, was the first European to sail along and explore the California coast. Although he claimed all he saw as territory of the Spanish Empire, no efforts at colonization were made for over two hundred years. Concerned about colonizing efforts by the Russians and French, Spain set plans in motion in the 1760s to establish a presence and defend its claim to the territory.

The Spanish settlement did not reach Alta California until 1769, when explorer Gaspar de Portolà reached the San Diego area via the first land route from Mexico. Accompanying him were two Franciscan Padres, Junípero Serra and Juan Crespí, who recorded the expedition. As they came through today's Elysian Park, they were awed by a river that flowed from the northwest, past their point and on southward. Crespí named the river El Río de Nuestra Señora la Reina de los Ángeles de Porciúncula, meaning, in Spanish, "the River of Our Lady Queen of the Angels of Porciuncula". The name derives from Santa Maria degli Angeli (Italian: "St. Mary of the Angels") which is the name of the small town in Italy housing the Porciuncula, the church where St. Francis of Assisi, founder of the Franciscan order, carried out his religious life. The river that was called the Porciuncula is today's Los Angeles River. Because the future town's name was a take on this "Queen of Heaven" Marian title, various versions of Crespí's formula would be used for the town, including El Pueblo de Nuestra Señora la Reina de los Ángeles sobre el Río Porciúncula.

During the expedition, Father Crespí observed a location along the river that would be good for a settlement or mission. However, in 1771, Father Serra instead commissioned two missionaries to establish the Mission San Gabriel Arcángel-San Gabriel Mission near the present day Whittier Narrows section of the San Gabriel River. The missionaries encountered resistance from the Tongva to their attempts to resettle the Natives on the mission. The mission encountered further trouble in 1776 when a flood damaged the mission, convincing the missionaries to move and rebuild the mission on a higher and more defensible location: its present site in San Gabriel. The first Spanish governor of Las Californias, Felipe de Neve had, as well, recommended to Viceroy Bucareli Father Crespí's location on the Río Porciúncula (Los Angeles River) for a mission. Instead, in 1781, King Charles III mandated that a pueblo be built on the site instead, which would be the second town in Alta California, after San José de Guadalupe in 1777. The monarch, disregarding the production and trade roles of the missions, saw a greater need for secular pueblos to be established as the centers of agriculture and commerce to supply the crown's ever-growing military presence in "Nueva California." The priests at the missions ignored the royal mandate and continued their ranching, trading and production of tallow, soap, hides, and beef, often in competition with new pueblo ventures.

=== Settlement ===
Governor de Neve took his assignment seriously and had a complete set of maps and plans drawn up by May 1780 for the layout and settlement of the new pueblo, including the placement of government houses, town houses, the church, the fields, the farms, and access to the river – the Instrucción and the Reglamento para el gobierno de la Provincia de Californias. But gathering the pobladores-settlers was a little more difficult. After failing to recruit the target number of families in Sonora, he had to go as far as Sinaloa to finally end up with 11 families, that is, 11 men, 11 women, and 22 children of various Spanish American castes: Criollo, Mulatto and Negro.

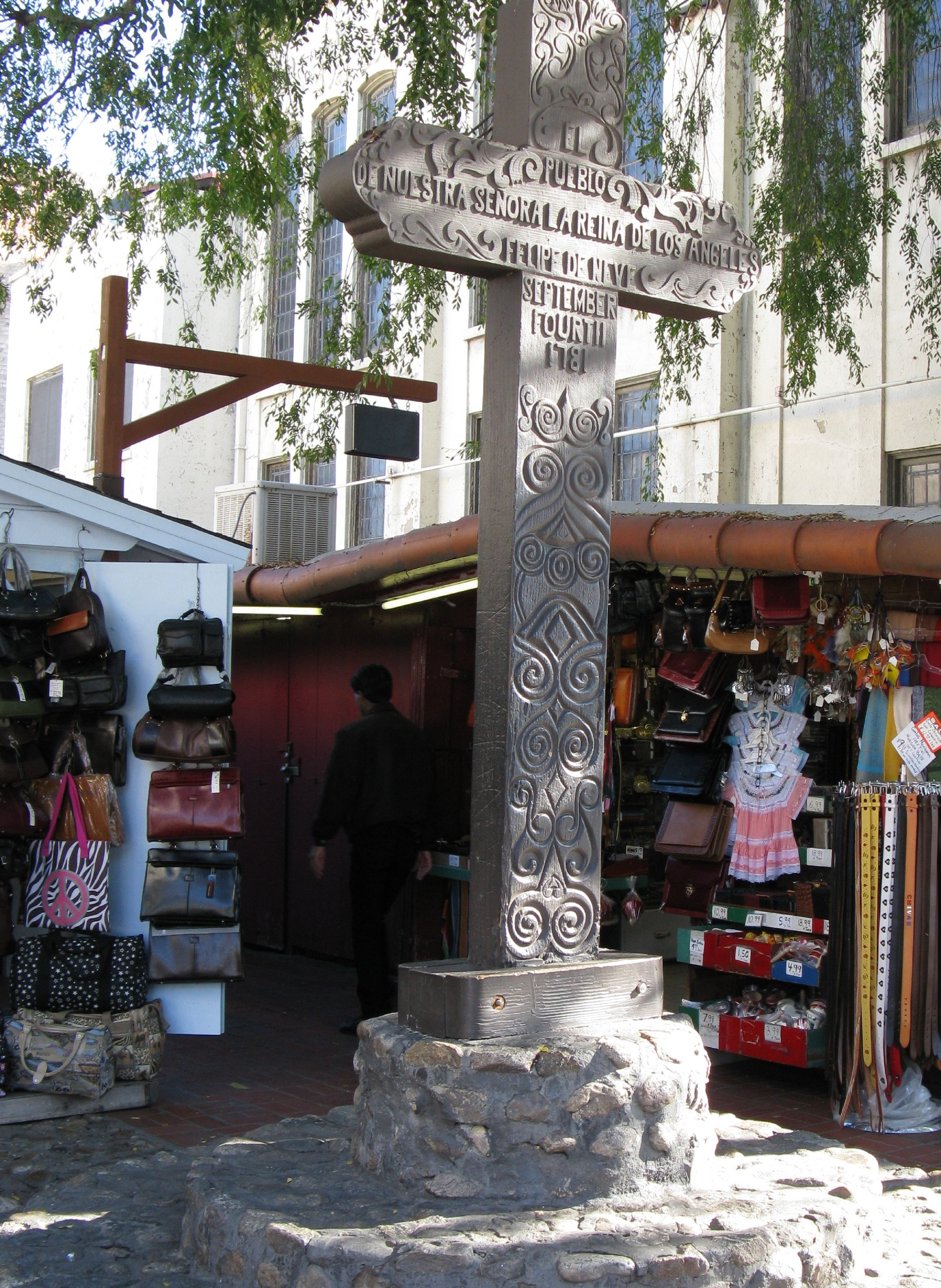
Monument commemorating origin of Pueblo de Los Angeles

As local lore tells it, on September 4, 1781, the 44 pobladores gathered at San Gabriel Mission and, escorted by a military detachment and two priests from the Mission, set out for the site that Crespí had chosen. In reality, several of the families were probably already working on their plots of land as early as late July. Governor de Neve gave the new town the name El Pueblo de la Reina de los Ángeles-The Town of the Queen of the Angels. In accordance with the Laws of the Indies and Reglamento the new towns in Alta California were to have four square leagues of land; that is a distance marked by one league in each cardinal direction from the town center. The streets, however, were laid out at forty-five degrees from the cardinal directions, a plan which is still preserved in Downtown Los Angeles. The old town limits are still marked by Hoover and Indiana Streets in the west and east respectively. In 1784 an asistencia or sub-mission of the San Gabriel Mission was established on the central plaza, to provide religious services to the settlers.

=== Government ===
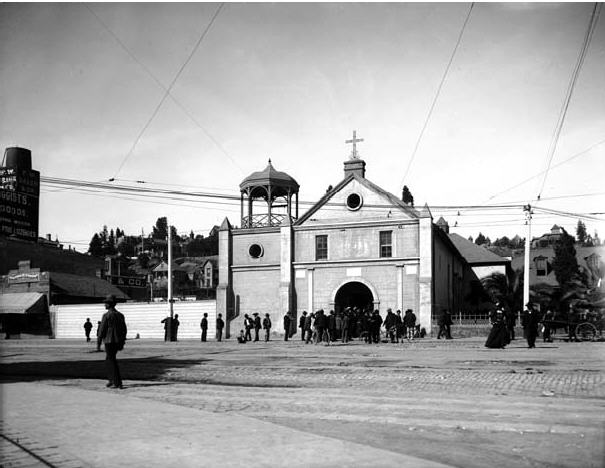
People gather in the original Plaza in front of the "Old Plaza Church", circa 1890–1900.

The pueblo came under the jurisdiction of the Commandancy General of the Internal Provinces in the Viceroyalty of New Spain. As a pueblo, Los Angeles was granted a cabildo (town council). The first municipal officers, the regidores (council members) and alcalde (municipal magistrate), were appointed by Governor de Neve. Subsequent ones were elected annually by the settlers, the vecinos pobladores. Since the government of Las Californias had a strong military orientation in this early phase of colonization, the civilian cabildo was originally supervised by a commisionado (commissioner) appointed by the comandante (commander) of the Presidio of Santa Barbara, who was charged with making sure the alcalde and regidores carried out their duties correctly. The first commisionado was José Vicente Feliz, one of the soldiers who accompanied the original 44 settlers to the pueblo. The first recorded alcalde was José Vanegas, who served in 1786 and 1796. Vanegas was first listed as an Indian in the original 1781 padrón (register) but then as a Mestizo in the 1790 census. The next few alcaldes reflected the mixed population of the small settlement: José Sinova, a Criollo, 1789; Mariano de la Luz Verdugo, a Criollo, 1790; and Juan Francisco Reyes, a Mulatto, 1793. Among the first regidores were Felipe Santiago García (a Criollo) and Manuel Camero (a Mulatto in the 1781 padrón, and a Mestizo in 1790 census). In judicial affairs, both military and civil cases were appealed to the Audiencia of Guadalajara.

=== La Iglesia de Nuestra Señora la Reina de los Ángeles ===
On 18 August 1814 Father Luis Gíl y Taboada placed the cornerstone of a new Franciscan church amidst the ruins of the original asistencia. The completed structure was dedicated on 8 December 1822. A replacement chapel, named La Iglesia de Nuestra Señora de los Ángeles (The Church of Our Lady of the Angels) was rebuilt utilizing materials of the original church in 1861. The term Reina (queen) was added later to reconcile the church's name with that of the town. The small chapel, also called "La Placita" and "the Plaza Church," served the total Californio and immigrant Roman Catholic community as the only church in the vicinity of the City of Los Angeles until the 1876 construction of the Cathedral of Saint Vibiana. Saint Vibiana Cathedral became the English-speaking parish and La Placita became the Spanish-speaking parish. "The Plaza Church" still stands today, exhibiting Spanish Colonial and Carpenter Gothic architectural styles.

The Los Angeles parish was under the Diocese of Sonora until 1840, when a new Diocese of the Two Californias was established to serve the Baja California Peninsula and Alta California. Both the dioceses of Sonora and the Two Californias were suffragan of the Archdiocese of Mexico.

== Mexican independence and era ==
After Mexico's War of Independence (1810–1821) from Spain, life began to change in Los Angeles and Alta California. With the secularization of the missions, their land was distributed for the establishment of many more ranchos. The Native population was displaced or absorbed into the Hispanic population.

Beginning about 1827, Los Angeles, now the largest pueblo of the territory, became a rival of Monterey for the honor of being the capital of California; was the seat of conspiracies to overthrow the Mexican authority; and the stronghold of the South California party in the bickering and struggles that lasted down to the American occupation.

In 1835, Richard Henry Dana Jr. visited San Pedro Harbor as a sailor. His book, Two Years Before the Mast, includes a brief depiction of the pueblo and area, then dependent on the export of cattle hides and tallow. In 1835 it was made a city by the Mexican Congress, and declared the capital, but the last provision was not enforced and was soon recalled. In 1836–1838, it was the headquarters of Carlos Antonio Carrillo, a legally named but never de facto governor of California, whose jurisdiction was never recognized in the north; and, in 1845–1847, it was the actual capital.

In 1842, a sheep rancher, pausing under an oak tree, discovered gold in Placerita Canyon in Rancho San Francisco, just north of the city sparking a minor gold rush. In subsequent decades local mining employed hard rock and placer techniques. Land however turned out to be the more "profitable gold", as ranching and development expanded as the town and region grew.

=== Mexican–American War ===
Manifest Destiny reached California at the time of the Mexican–American War (1846–1848). On June 18, 1846, a small group of Yankees raised the California Bear Flag and declared independence from Mexico in the Bear Flag Revolt on the Plaza in Sonoma, Northern California. United States troops then took control of the presidios at Monterey and San Francisco, and proclaimed the invading "conquest" complete. In Southern California, the Mexican citizens repelled American troops for five months, utilizing about 160 vaqueros, or cowboys, against about 700 American forces.

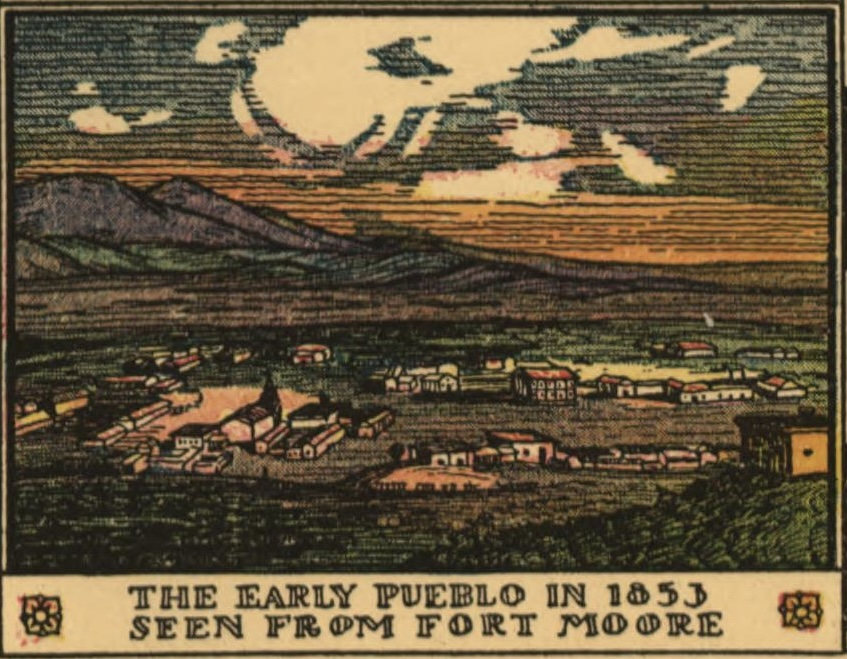
Image from 1929 story map Los Angeles as it was in 1871

Los Angeles initially surrendered to the surprise invasion by United States forces. The small Mexican forces of Los Angeles fled at the approach of US troops, and August 13, 1846, the American flag was raised over the city. A garrison of fifty US Marines under Archibald Gillespie was left in control. The city's population had been rent by factional quarrels when war broke out between Mexico and the United States, but the occupation caused both factions to unite against the invading Americans. Gillespie's garrison was compelled to withdraw in October when the residents, Californio Lancers, vaqueros on horseback without firearms, only lances, revolted and chased the US occupying force back to the San Pedro Harbor. Los Angeles was not retaken until Commodore Stockton again captured the city on January 10, 1847, after the battles at the Siege of Los Angeles, Battle of Dominguez Rancho, Battle of San Pasqual, Battle of Rio San Gabriel and the Battle of La Mesa. These battles, in which the Californios were greatly outmanned and outgunned, represented the important overt resistance to the establishment of the American regime in the Los Angeles Basin. Lieutenant-Colonel Frémont and Governor of Alta California Andrés Pico signed the Treaty of Cahuenga, an informal agreement to cease fighting in California at the Campo de Cahuenga in the San Fernando Valley in January 1847. Under the later comprehensive 1848 Treaty of Guadalupe Hidalgo, Mexico formally ceded nearly half its nation's total territory, including Alta California, to the United States.

== Modern state park ==
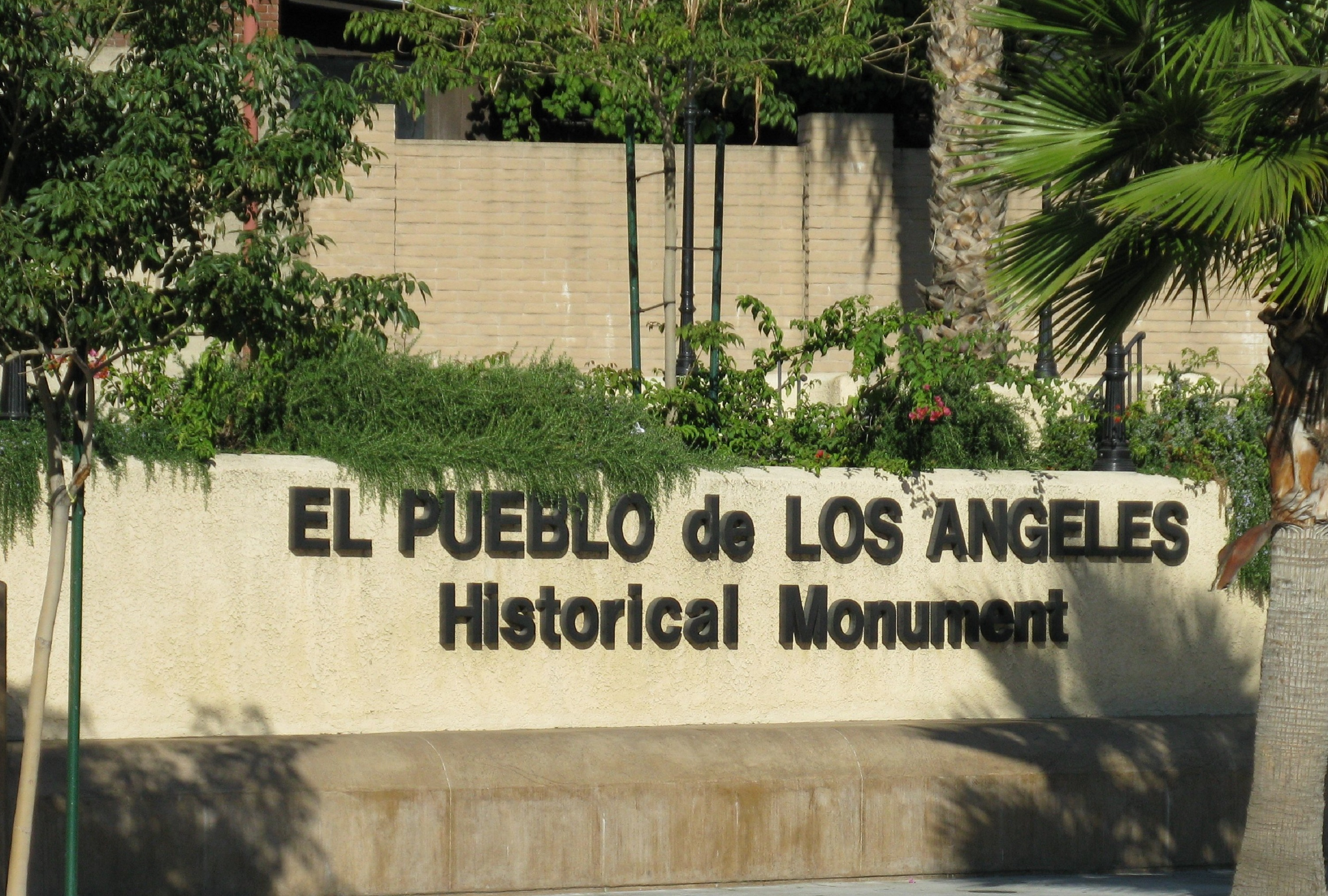
Historical monument marker

A 1920s restoration drive led by Christine Sterling began a restoration of the historic area, starting with Olvera Street. Today the Pueblo's original outline is preserved by the El Pueblo de Los Angeles Historic Monument. Among its saved and restored buildings is the oldest standing residence in Los Angeles City, the 1818 Avila Adobe built by Francisco Avila who owned Rancho Las Cienegas -"mid Wilshire area" and a successful cattle enterprise. Across Olvera Street stands the 1887 Eloisa Martinez de Sepulveda House, that now is the Los Angeles Plaza Historic District Visitors Center. The 1939 construction of the significant transit hub and architectural landmark, the Los Angeles Union Station east of the old Plaza, added to the Pueblo area's reinvigoration.

Of archaeological interest is the discovery of sections of the original brick lined Zanja Madre-the Mother Ditch, which was a "surface and underground" gravity fed canal and aqueduct, that brought water from the Rio Porciuncula-Los Angeles River near the Arroyo Seco confluence, to the colonial pueblo and later the American city into the latter 19th century.

== See also ==
- Bibliography of Los Angeles
- Outline of the history of Los Angeles
- Bibliography of California history
- History of Los Angeles
- Los Angeles Plaza Historic District
- Zanja Madre
- Laws of the Indies
- Spanish colonial pueblos and villas in North America

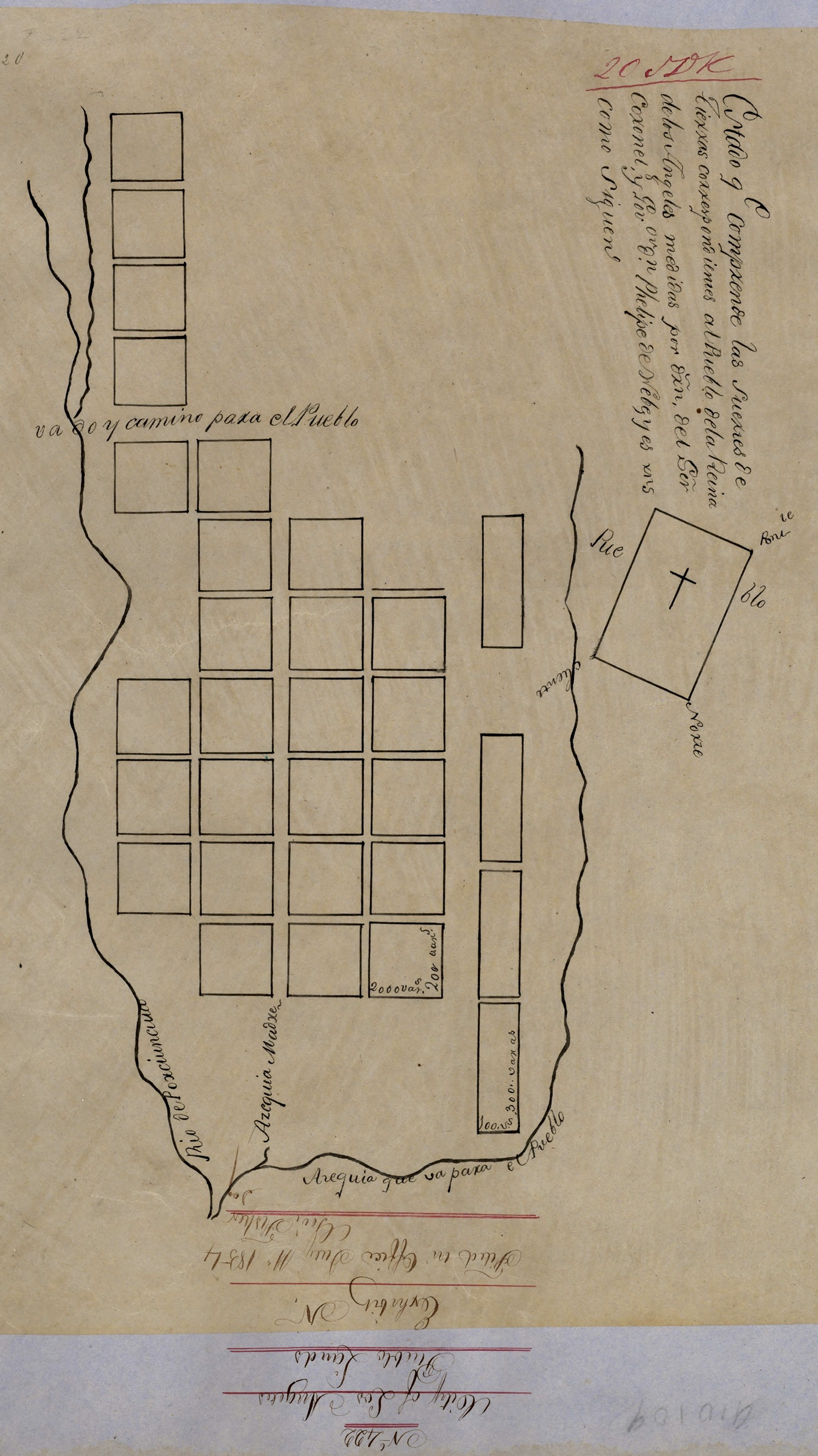
Diseño submitted 1854 Los Angeles City Lands, including Plaza Church and "Azequia Madre"
