= 2002 California Secretary of State election =

- November 5, 2002
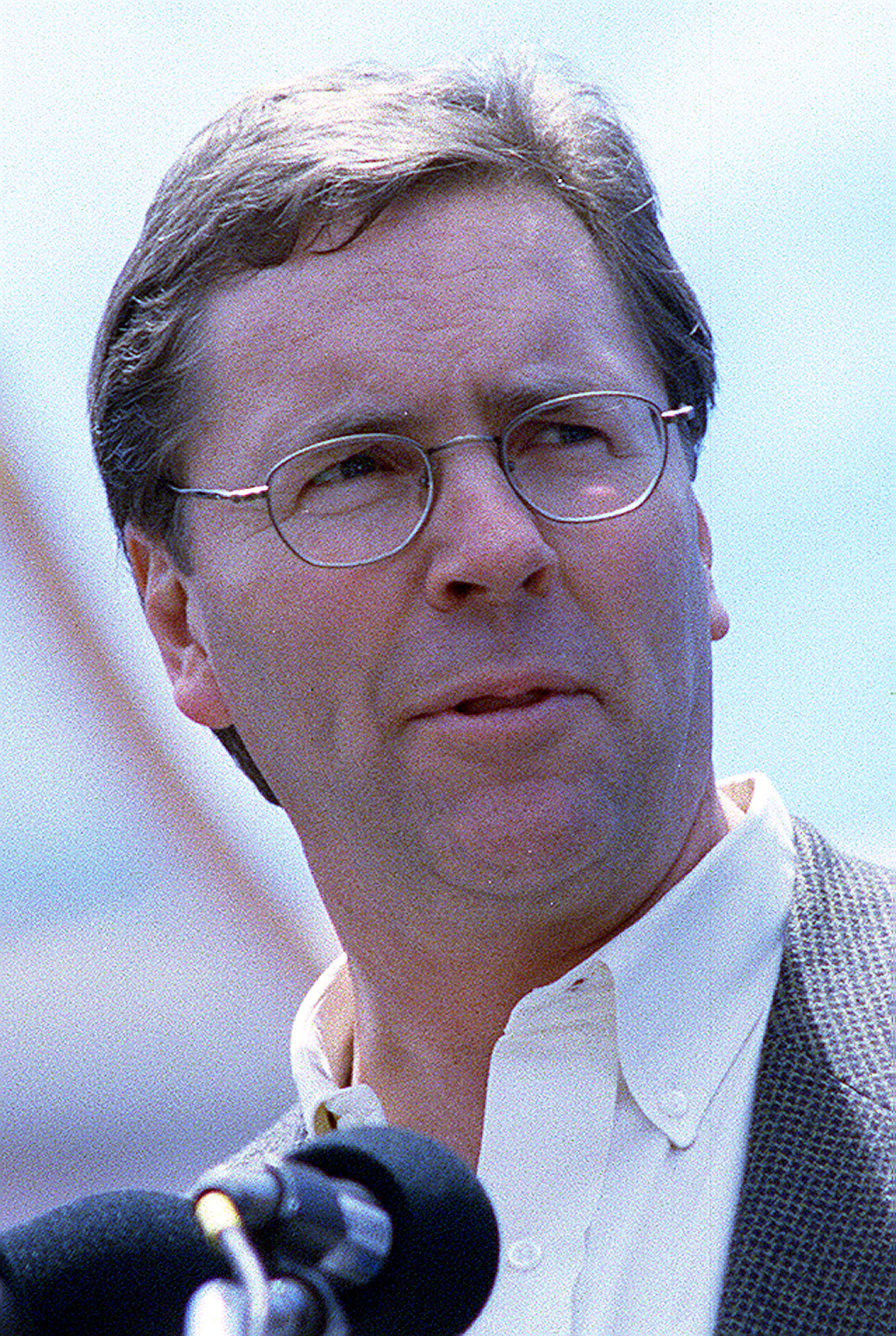

| Nominee | Kevin Shelley | Keith Olberg |
| Party | Democratic | Republican |
| Popular vote | 3,357,173 | 3,070,879 |
| Percentage | 46.26% | 42.31% |
- County results Shelley: 40–50% 50–60% 60–70% 70–80% Olberg: 40–50% 50–60% 60–70%
Sec. of State before election
Bill Jones
Republican
Elected Sec. of State
Kevin Shelley
Democratic

The 2002 California Secretary of State election occurred on November 5, 2002. The primary elections took place on June 4, 2002. State Assemblyman Kevin Shelley (D-San Francisco), the Democratic nominee, narrowly defeated the Republican, former State Assemblyman Keith Olberg (R-Hesperia). Shelley's victory gave Democrats complete control of state government for the first time since before the Civil War.

== Primary results ==
Final results from California Secretary of State.

=== Democratic ===
==== Candidates ====
- Kevin Shelley, State Assemblyman
- March Fong Eu, Former Secretary of State and Former US Ambassador to Micronesia
- Michela Alioto, Former Aide to Al Gore, nominee for CA-01 in 1996 and Secretary of State in 1998
- Carl Henley
- Shawn Casey O'Brien

California Secretary of State Democratic primary, 2002
| Candidate | Votes | % |
|---|---|---|
| Kevin Shelley | 737,748 | 33.81 |
| March Fong Eu | 633,369 | 29.03 |
| Michela Alioto | 613,802 | 28.13 |
| Carl Henley | 115,255 | 5.28 |
| Shawn Casey O'Brien | 81,590 | 3.74 |
| Total votes | 1,567,932 | 100.00 |

=== Republican ===
==== Candidates ====
- Keith Olberg, former State Assemblyman (R-Hesperia)
- Mike Schaefer
- Barbara Jean Marr

California Secretary of State Republican primary, 2002
| Candidate | Votes | % |
|---|---|---|
| Keith Olberg | 1,227,880 | 62.05 |
| Mike Schaefer | 409,215 | 20.68 |
| Barbara Jean Marr | 341,856 | 17.27 |
| Total votes | 1,978,951 | 100.00 |

=== Others ===
California Secretary of State primary, 2002 (Others)
| Party | Candidate | Votes | % |
|---|---|---|---|
| Green | Larry Shoup | 35,435 | 100.00 |
| Libertarian | Gail Lightfoot | 19,566 | 100.00 |
| American Independent | Edward C. Noonan | 26,613 | 100.00 |
| Reform | Valli Sharpe-Geisler | 7,240 | 100.00 |
| Natural Law | Louise Marie Allison | 4,774 | 100.00 |

== General election results ==
Final results from the Secretary of State of California.

2002 Secretary of State election, California
| Party | Candidate | Votes | % |
|---|---|---|---|
| Democratic | Kevin Shelley | 3,357,173 | 46.26 |
| Republican | Keith Olberg | 3,070,879 | 42.31 |
| Green | Larry Shoup | 282,340 | 3.89 |
| Libertarian | Gail Lightfoot | 204,527 | 2.82 |
| Natural Law | Louise Marie Allison | 176,792 | 2.44 |
| American Independent | Edward C. Noonan | 87,610 | 1.21 |
| Reform | Valli Sharpe-Geisler | 78,565 | 1.08 |
| Invalid or blank votes | | 480,935 | 6.21 |
| Total votes | | 7,257,886 | 100.00 |
| Turnout | | | 36.05 |
| Democratic gain from Republican | | | |

=== Results by county ===
| County | Shelley | Votes | Olberg | Votes | Shoup | Votes | Lightfoot | Votes | Allison | Votes | Others | Votes |
|---|---|---|---|---|---|---|---|---|---|---|---|---|
| San Francisco | 73.67% | 151,087 | 12.91% | 26,467 | 7.72% | 15,841 | 2.37% | 4,851 | 1.74% | 3,564 | 1.59% | 3,271 |
| Alameda | 63.29% | 208,280 | 22.59% | 74,356 | 7.72% | 25,399 | 2.46% | 8,109 | 2.02% | 6,634 | 1.92% | 6,312 |
| Marin | 58.44% | 44,240 | 28.04% | 21,224 | 8.18% | 6,193 | 2.46% | 1,866 | 1.32% | 997 | 1.56% | 1,184 |
| San Mateo | 57.78% | 93,457 | 29.02% | 46,942 | 5.24% | 8,482 | 3.12% | 5,049 | 2.44% | 3,954 | 2.38% | 3,850 |
| Los Angeles | 54.68% | 887,986 | 34.12% | 554,135 | 3.40% | 55,258 | 2.72% | 44,152 | 2.75% | 44,610 | 2.33% | 37,761 |
| Santa Clara | 54.32% | 188,179 | 34.29% | 118,798 | 4.15% | 14,381 | 2.63% | 9,094 | 2.12% | 7,333 | 2.49% | 8,620 |
| Contra Costa | 51.93% | 130,248 | 37.34% | 93,643 | 3.83% | 9,600 | 2.85% | 7,146 | 1.98% | 4,971 | 2.08% | 5,210 |
| Santa Cruz | 51.66% | 38,591 | 28.84% | 21,540 | 11.08% | 8,276 | 3.81% | 2,847 | 2.36% | 1,761 | 2.26% | 1,685 |
| Sonoma | 51.06% | 61,082 | 30.88% | 36,941 | 8.85% | 10,583 | 3.98% | 4,765 | 2.37% | 2,841 | 2.86% | 3,424 |
| Monterey | 50.78% | 42,033 | 37.19% | 30,786 | 3.66% | 3,027 | 3.18% | 2,635 | 2.78% | 2,300 | 2.42% | 2,001 |
| Solano | 50.76% | 44,134 | 38.11% | 33,130 | 2.91% | 2,528 | 2.98% | 2,589 | 2.34% | 2,037 | 2.90% | 2,521 |
| Imperial | 50.27% | 10,519 | 40.16% | 8,402 | 1.48% | 309 | 2.33% | 488 | 3.51% | 735 | 2.25% | 470 |
| Yolo | 48.90% | 21,983 | 37.37% | 16,799 | 6.94% | 3,119 | 2.33% | 1,047 | 2.37% | 1,064 | 2.10% | 946 |
| Napa | 48.58% | 17,275 | 38.06% | 13,534 | 5.39% | 1,915 | 3.44% | 1,225 | 2.22% | 789 | 2.31% | 823 |
| Lake | 46.67% | 7,249 | 40.19% | 6,243 | 4.92% | 764 | 3.10% | 482 | 2.30% | 357 | 2.82% | 438 |
| San Benito | 45.99% | 4,614 | 41.65% | 4,179 | 3.20% | 321 | 3.62% | 363 | 3.08% | 309 | 2.46% | 247 |
| Merced | 44.01% | 17,514 | 47.42% | 18,871 | 1.63% | 649 | 2.45% | 974 | 2.49% | 989 | 2.00% | 795 |
| Mendocino | 43.58% | 10,586 | 32.73% | 7,950 | 14.29% | 3,470 | 3.89% | 945 | 2.48% | 602 | 3.04% | 738 |
| Sacramento | 43.11% | 129,618 | 45.62% | 137,142 | 3.91% | 11,746 | 2.64% | 7,935 | 2.43% | 7,306 | 2.29% | 6,887 |
| San Joaquin | 42.14% | 49,968 | 48.16% | 57,109 | 2.24% | 2,654 | 2.67% | 3,170 | 2.54% | 3,007 | 2.26% | 2,676 |
| Stanislaus | 41.88% | 37,751 | 49.08% | 44,240 | 2.18% | 1,967 | 2.64% | 2,379 | 2.05% | 1,851 | 2.17% | 1,957 |
| Humboldt | 41.36% | 16,240 | 36.31% | 14,258 | 12.43% | 4,881 | 4.18% | 1,640 | 3.10% | 1,216 | 2.62% | 1,029 |
| Santa Barbara | 40.39% | 43,628 | 46.80% | 50,550 | 5.51% | 5,955 | 3.25% | 3,506 | 2.15% | 2,321 | 1.90% | 2,052 |
| Alpine | 40.11% | 215 | 41.23% | 221 | 6.72% | 36 | 5.97% | 32 | 2.80% | 15 | 3.17% | 17 |
| Del Norte | 39.56% | 2,448 | 46.56% | 2,881 | 3.65% | 226 | 4.25% | 263 | 3.02% | 187 | 2.96% | 183 |
| Ventura | 39.37% | 74,778 | 49.01% | 93,081 | 3.14% | 5,956 | 3.22% | 6,117 | 2.90% | 5,511 | 2.37% | 4,492 |
| San Diego | 38.61% | 244,272 | 50.92% | 322,190 | 2.87% | 18,182 | 2.89% | 18,285 | 2.40% | 15,155 | 2.31% | 14,610 |
| San Bernardino | 38.55% | 106,746 | 51.48% | 142,558 | 2.12% | 5,872 | 2.90% | 8,044 | 2.57% | 7,130 | 2.38% | 6,580 |
| Riverside | 38.12% | 113,778 | 53.14% | 158,595 | 1.76% | 5,263 | 2.33% | 6,955 | 2.48% | 7,404 | 2.17% | 6,478 |
| Fresno | 37.76% | 55,911 | 53.60% | 79,375 | 1.84% | 2,725 | 2.38% | 3,525 | 2.40% | 3,548 | 2.03% | 3,004 |
| Tuolumne | 37.25% | 6,625 | 51.63% | 9,181 | 3.76% | 669 | 3.05% | 543 | 1.65% | 294 | 2.65% | 471 |
| Kings | 37.15% | 7,780 | 53.88% | 11,283 | 1.21% | 253 | 2.16% | 452 | 3.48% | 729 | 2.12% | 444 |
| Trinity | 34.87% | 1,659 | 47.14% | 2,243 | 5.76% | 274 | 5.74% | 273 | 2.96% | 141 | 3.53% | 168 |
| Amador | 34.41% | 4,381 | 54.22% | 6,904 | 3.46% | 440 | 3.24% | 413 | 2.25% | 287 | 2.42% | 308 |
| San Luis Obispo | 34.18% | 27,124 | 52.25% | 41,463 | 5.35% | 4,249 | 4.04% | 3,208 | 2.01% | 1,599 | 2.16% | 1,712 |
| Mono | 33.84% | 982 | 52.38% | 1,520 | 6.06% | 176 | 3.65% | 106 | 1.41% | 41 | 2.65% | 77 |
| Kern | 33.66% | 44,758 | 57.47% | 76,426 | 1.35% | 1,798 | 2.72% | 3,611 | 2.44% | 3,244 | 2.36% | 3,142 |
| Calaveras | 33.42% | 4,774 | 53.68% | 7,668 | 4.42% | 631 | 3.86% | 552 | 1.90% | 272 | 2.71% | 387 |
| Tulare | 32.93% | 19,766 | 58.12% | 34,887 | 1.58% | 950 | 2.47% | 1,483 | 2.40% | 1,441 | 2.49% | 1,494 |
| Butte | 32.88% | 16,957 | 52.52% | 27,091 | 7.03% | 3,624 | 3.11% | 1,605 | 2.09% | 1,079 | 2.37% | 1,222 |
| Nevada | 32.60% | 12,561 | 52.80% | 20,346 | 7.45% | 2,872 | 3.03% | 1,166 | 2.03% | 782 | 2.09% | 806 |
| Orange | 32.53% | 198,525 | 57.38% | 350,227 | 2.33% | 14,191 | 2.78% | 16,972 | 2.59% | 15,806 | 2.40% | 14,632 |
| Madera | 32.49% | 7,659 | 58.86% | 13,875 | 1.63% | 384 | 2.87% | 677 | 1.98% | 467 | 2.16% | 510 |
| Mariposa | 31.83% | 1,938 | 54.95% | 3,346 | 4.14% | 252 | 3.51% | 214 | 2.43% | 148 | 3.14% | 191 |
| Siskiyou | 31.68% | 4,800 | 54.77% | 8,299 | 3.10% | 470 | 4.16% | 631 | 3.29% | 498 | 3.00% | 454 |
| Plumas | 31.26% | 2,419 | 55.23% | 4,274 | 3.75% | 290 | 3.93% | 304 | 2.87% | 222 | 2.96% | 229 |
| Placer | 31.16% | 25,987 | 59.72% | 49,807 | 3.02% | 2,516 | 2.61% | 2,177 | 1.58% | 1,314 | 1.92% | 1,601 |
| Tehama | 31.14% | 4,691 | 56.48% | 8,508 | 2.37% | 357 | 3.49% | 526 | 3.34% | 503 | 3.19% | 480 |
| El Dorado | 30.89% | 16,744 | 58.31% | 31,607 | 4.01% | 2,172 | 2.97% | 1,610 | 1.69% | 917 | 2.14% | 1,159 |
| Yuba | 30.67% | 3,284 | 57.68% | 6,177 | 2.96% | 317 | 3.04% | 326 | 2.33% | 249 | 3.32% | 356 |
| Sierra | 29.82% | 419 | 56.01% | 787 | 3.91% | 55 | 4.91% | 69 | 1.71% | 24 | 3.63% | 51 |
| Shasta | 29.78% | 14,201 | 59.06% | 28,165 | 2.28% | 1,085 | 3.06% | 1,461 | 3.03% | 1,444 | 2.79% | 1,329 |
| Lassen | 29.30% | 2,221 | 58.91% | 4,466 | 2.04% | 155 | 4.09% | 310 | 2.52% | 191 | 3.14% | 238 |
| Sutter | 29.08% | 5,417 | 62.36% | 11,618 | 1.69% | 314 | 2.05% | 382 | 2.62% | 489 | 2.20% | 410 |
| Colusa | 28.84% | 1,249 | 61.51% | 2,664 | 1.99% | 86 | 2.33% | 101 | 2.63% | 114 | 2.70% | 117 |
| Glenn | 27.20% | 1,730 | 62.74% | 3,990 | 2.09% | 133 | 3.05% | 194 | 2.47% | 157 | 2.45% | 156 |
| Inyo | 27.18% | 1,520 | 62.77% | 3,511 | 2.97% | 166 | 2.91% | 163 | 1.73% | 97 | 2.43% | 136 |
| Modoc | 24.70% | 816 | 62.53% | 2,066 | 2.00% | 66 | 4.21% | 139 | 2.78% | 92 | 3.78% | 125 |

== See also ==
- California state elections, 2002
- State of California
- Secretary of State of California
