= 1994 California Secretary of State election =

- November 8, 1994
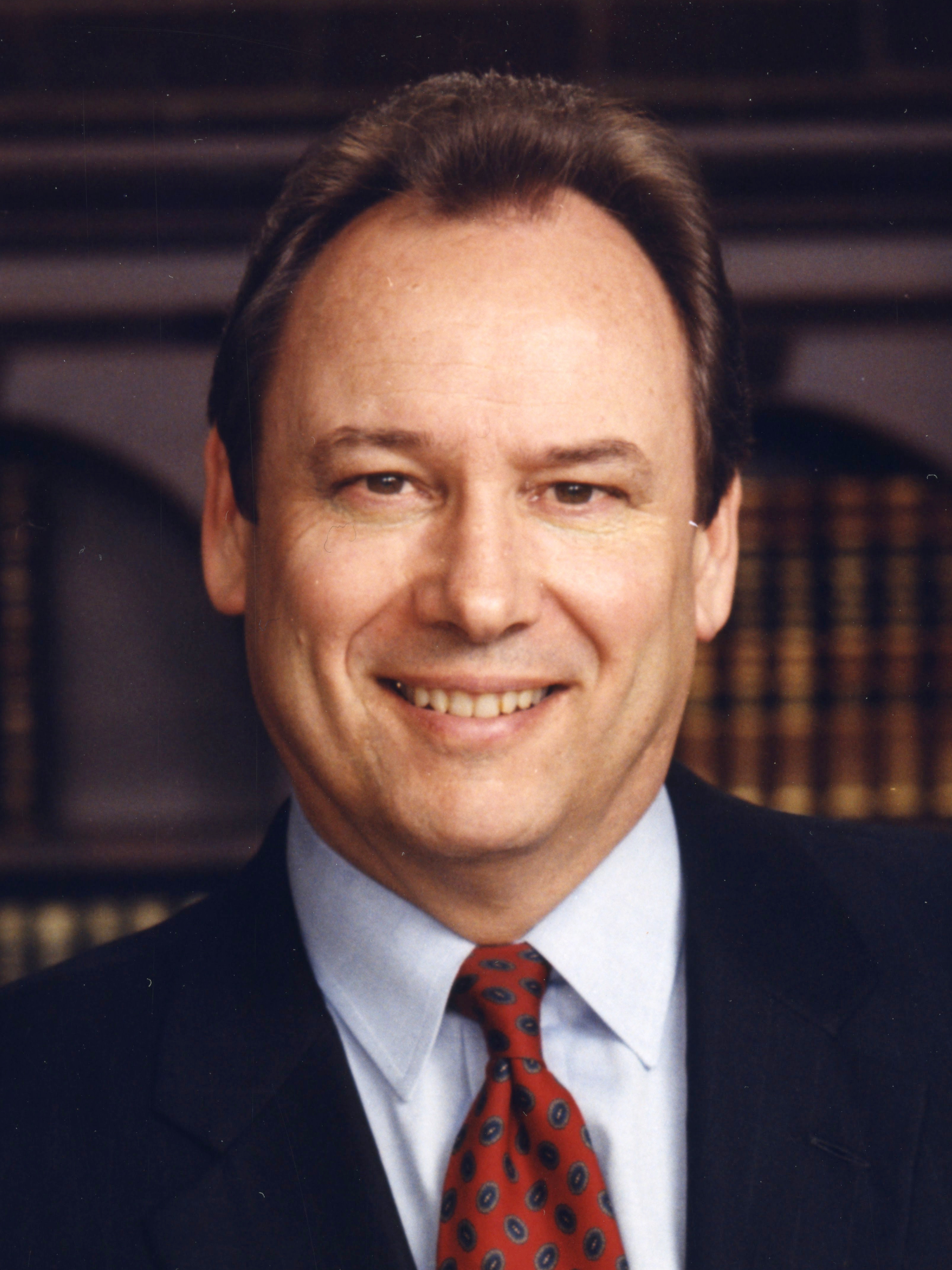

Nominee	Bill Jones	Tony Miller
Party	Republican	Democratic
Popular vote	3,727,894	3,690,841
Percentage	45.27%	44.82%
- County results Jones: 40–50% 50–60% 60–70% Miller: 40–50% 50–60% 60–70%
Sec. of State before election
Tony Miller
Democratic
Elected Sec. of State
Bill Jones
Republican

The 1994 California Secretary of State election occurred on November 8, 1994. The primary elections took place on March 8, 1994. The Republican nominee, State Assemblyman Bill Jones, narrowly defeated the Democratic nominee, acting Secretary of State Tony Miller, who assumed the seat when March Fong Eu resigned to become United States Ambassador to Micronesia.

== Primary results ==
Final results from California Secretary of State.

=== Democratic ===
==== Candidates ====
- Tony Miller, Incumbent Acting Secretary of State
- Mike Woo, Former Los Angeles Councilman and candidate for Los Angeles Mayor in 1993
- Gwen Moore, State Assemblywoman

California Secretary of State Democratic primary, 1994
Candidate	Votes	%
Tony Miller	808,841	37.99
Michael Woo	670,990	31.51
Gwen Moore	649,343	30.50
Total votes	2,129,174	100.00

=== Green ===
California Secretary of State Green primary, 1994
Candidate	Votes	%
Margaret Garcia	12,681	74.40
None of the above	4,363	25.60
Total votes	2,129,174	100.00

=== Others ===
California Secretary of State primary, 1994 (Others)
Party	Candidate	Votes	%
Republican	Bill Jones	1,642,017	100.00
American Independent	Dorothy Kreiss Robbins	18,185	100.00
Libertarian	Peggy Christensen	13,710	100.00
Peace and Freedom	Israel Feuer	4,230	100.00

== General election results ==
Final results from the Secretary of State of California.

1994 Secretary of State election, California
Party	Candidate	Votes	%
Republican	Bill Jones	3,727,894	45.27
Democratic	Tony Miller (incumbent)	3,690,841	44.82
Green	Margaret Garcia	315,079	3.83
Libertarian	Peggy Christensen	248,748	3.02
American Independent	Dorothy Kreiss Robbins	151,720	1.84
Peace and Freedom	Israel Feuer	99,916	1.21
Invalid or blank votes		666,438	7.49
Total votes		8,234,198	100.00
Turnout			46.98
Republican gain from Democratic			

=== Results by county ===
County	Jones	Votes	Miller	Votes	Garcia	Votes	Christensen	Votes	Others	Votes
Tulare	67.00%	51,697	26.26%	20,261	3.01%	2,323	1.59%	1,226	2.14%	1,652
Glenn	64.24%	5,015	29.24%	2,283	1.59%	124	2.28%	178	2.65%	207
Madera	64.01%	16,887	29.94%	7,899	2.46%	650	1.55%	410	2.03%	536
Inyo	61.97%	4,382	30.42%	2,151	2.11%	149	2.83%	200	2.67%	189
Sutter	61.92%	13,384	31.23%	6,751	2.17%	468	2.35%	507	2.34%	505
Colusa	60.27%	2,945	33.48%	1,636	1.92%	94	2.31%	113	2.00%	98
Kern	60.22%	89,366	30.85%	45,783	3.26%	4,845	2.73%	4,048	2.93%	4,354
Fresno	60.21%	105,217	32.24%	56,339	3.45%	6,031	1.91%	3,344	2.18%	3,806
Shasta	59.39%	31,731	32.02%	17,108	1.65%	882	2.72%	1,452	4.22%	2,253
Orange	58.92%	428,605	31.81%	231,440	2.90%	21,082	3.57%	25,998	2.80%	19,371
Tehama	58.91%	10,740	32.73%	5,967	1.65%	300	3.31%	604	3.40%	620
Mariposa	58.20%	4,087	33.68%	2,365	2.89%	203	2.22%	156	3.00%	211
Placer	57.95%	42,751	33.88%	24,994	2.25%	1,659	3.57%	2,633	2.36%	1,739
El Dorado	57.80%	30,730	33.75%	17,941	2.06%	1,093	3.66%	1,945	2.74%	1,456
Modoc	57.77%	2,196	31.89%	1,212	1.47%	56	3.84%	146	5.02%	191
Kings	57.43%	12,822	34.78%	7,766	3.09%	691	1.71%	382	2.98%	666
Mono	57.23%	1,936	33.34%	1,128	2.63%	89	3.43%	116	3.37%	114
Butte	56.87%	37,705	34.52%	22,885	2.39%	1,586	3.00%	1,989	3.23%	2,138
Nevada	56.36%	20,631	33.17%	12,143	3.65%	1,335	3.98%	1,458	2.84%	1,038
Yuba	56.15%	7,807	33.06%	4,596	2.47%	343	3.31%	460	5.01%	697
Calaveras	55.38%	8,521	35.40%	5,447	2.32%	357	3.75%	577	3.15%	484
Sierra	54.29%	847	34.74%	542	2.63%	41	3.72%	58	4.62%	72
Merced	53.91%	20,631	39.51%	15,120	2.91%	1,114	1.87%	714	1.80%	688
Riverside	53.90%	179,679	36.52%	121,757	3.12%	10,401	3.17%	10,564	3.29%	10,973
San Luis Obispo	53.64%	44,879	36.77%	30,766	3.50%	2,925	3.19%	2,671	2.89%	2,421
Amador	53.43%	6,801	39.19%	4,988	1.77%	225	3.17%	403	2.45%	312
San Bernardino	53.08%	177,579	36.85%	123,265	3.68%	12,299	3.15%	10,524	3.25%	10,871
Lassen	52.94%	4,216	36.70%	2,923	2.07%	165	3.87%	308	4.42%	352
San Diego	52.48%	371,233	38.46%	272,056	3.11%	22,015	3.27%	23,131	2.68%	19,008
Plumas	52.39%	4,367	38.94%	3,246	2.05%	171	3.38%	282	3.23%	269
Tuolumne	51.85%	9,928	40.85%	7,822	2.26%	433	2.60%	497	2.45%	469
Ventura	51.01%	106,349	39.01%	81,338	3.89%	8,116	3.23%	6,732	1.86%	5,960
Siskiyou	49.87%	8,827	39.92%	7,065	2.74%	485	3.39%	600	4.08%	722
San Joaquin	49.81%	61,811	42.67%	52,949	2.62%	3,255	2.43%	3,013	2.47%	3,069
Del Norte	49.18%	3,579	42.24%	3,074	2.43%	177	2.82%	205	3.34%	243
Stanislaus	48.81%	47,730	43.69%	42,720	2.81%	2,751	2.13%	2,079	2.56%	2,500
Santa Barbara	48.57%	60,901	40.64%	50,953	4.21%	5,283	2.91%	3,643	3.67%	4,600
San Benito	47.68%	5,418	41.27%	4,690	4.31%	490	3.62%	411	3.12%	355
Trinity	47.46%	2,505	39.01%	2,059	3.51%	185	4.59%	242	5.44%	287
Alpine	46.32%	296	37.72%	241	5.79%	37	5.01%	32	7.98%	51
Monterey	45.28%	40,260	44.67%	39,711	4.02%	3,577	2.88%	2,556	3.15%	2,800
Imperial	44.81%	10,475	40.97%	9,576	8.61%	2,013	2.04%	477	3.57%	835
Sacramento	44.63%	153,965	47.32%	163,247	2.78%	9,590	2.75%	9,475	2.51%	8,676
Lake	44.30%	8,446	47.16%	8,992	2.38%	453	3.15%	600	3.03%	576
Napa	42.01%	17,305	48.81%	20,104	3.25%	1,339	2.90%	1,193	3.03%	1,257
Humboldt	41.29%	18,964	44.18%	20,295	8.04%	3,692	3.12%	1,435	3.37%	1,548
Solano	40.46%	38,630	50.21%	47,943	3.56%	3,400	2.88%	2,750	2.89%	2,760
Contra Costa	39.57%	112,942	51.97%	148,350	2.91%	8,299	3.02%	8,617	2.53%	7,229
Los Angeles	39.08%	763,199	50.80%	992,169	4.33%	84,630	2.67%	52,217	3.11%	60,731
Santa Clara	38.73%	161,786	49.08%	205,034	4.29%	17,919	4.21%	17,584	3.70%	15,455
Yolo	37.70%	17,887	51.27%	24,326	5.46%	2,590	2.74%	1,299	2.83%	1,344
Mendocino	37.63%	10,747	47.73%	13,631	6.20%	1,771	3.93%	1,122	4.51%	1,288
Sonoma	35.58%	54,154	52.82%	80,395	4.46%	6,789	3.55%	5,410	3.58%	5,449
San Mateo	34.80%	69,791	55.50%	111,304	3.99%	8,010	3.13%	6,287	2.58%	5,164
Santa Cruz	34.59%	30,153	48.88%	42,618	7.54%	6,573	4.72%	4,111	4.27%	3,727
Marin	32.33%	32,133	56.24%	55,902	4.71%	4,683	3.06%	3,038	3.67%	3,641
Alameda	26.94%	102,117	61.69%	233,896	5.17%	19,618	2.91%	11,014	3.29%	12,478
San Francisco	17.63%	38,209	68.13%	147,679	7.01%	15,205	2.54%	5,512	4.68%	10,159

== See also ==
- California state elections, 1994
- State of California
- Secretary of State of California
