= 1978 California Secretary of State election =

- November 7, 1978
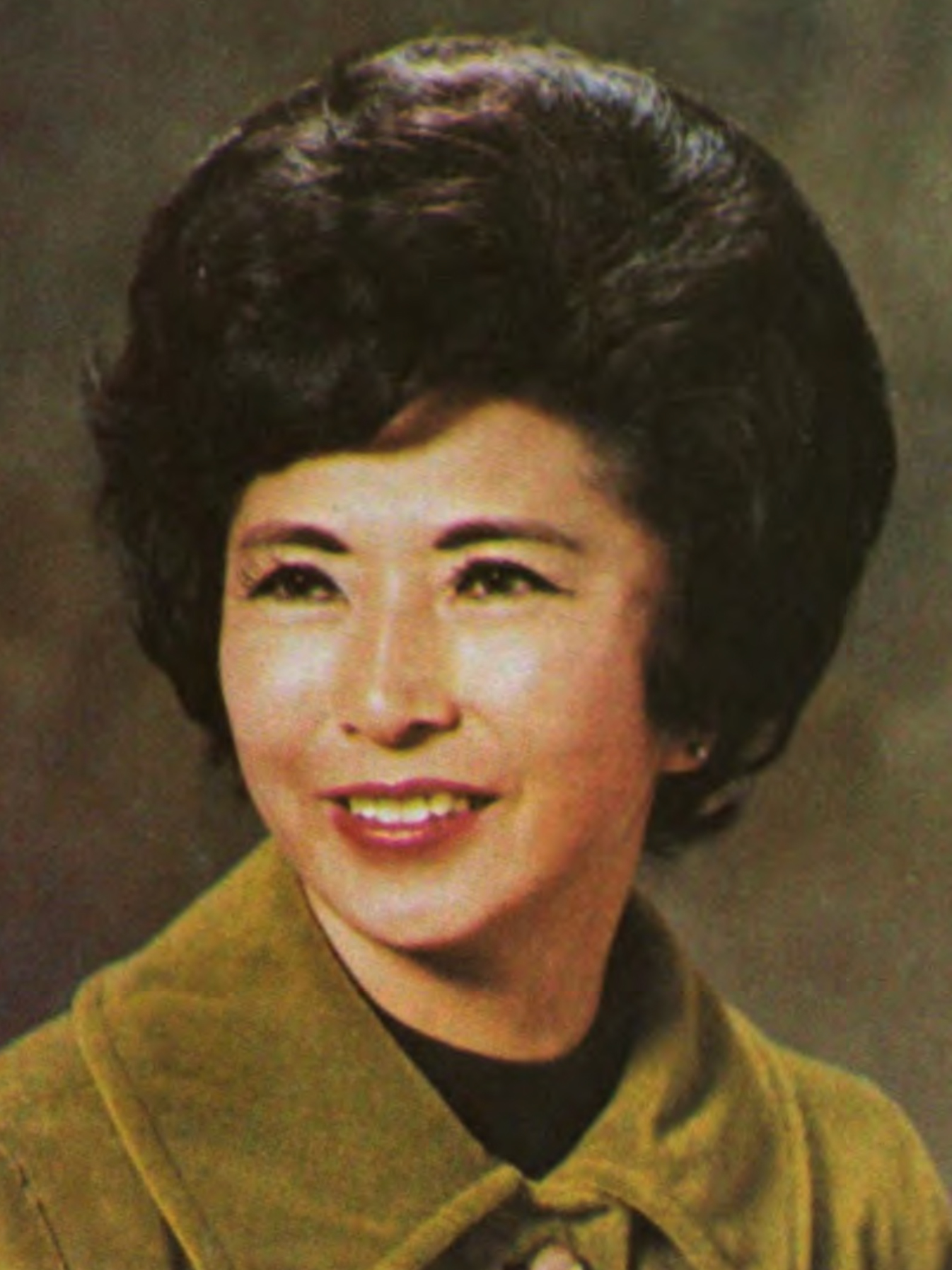

Nominee	March Fong Eu	Jacob "Jay" Margosian
Party	Democratic	Republican
Popular vote	4,104,695	1,982,145
Percentage	62.49%	30.17%
- County results Fong Eu: 50–60% 60–70% 70–80%
Secretary of State before election
March Fong Eu
Democratic
Elected Secretary of State
March Fong Eu
Democratic

The 1978 California Secretary of State election was held on November 7, 1978. Democratic incumbent March Fong Eu defeated Republican nominee Jacob "Jay" Margosian with 62.49% of the vote.

== General election ==
=== Candidates ===
Major party candidates

- March Fong Eu, Democratic
- Jacob "Jay" Margosian, Republican

Other candidates

- David Wald, Peace and Freedom
- Valerie C. Seeman, American Independent

=== Results ===
1978 California Secretary of State election
Party	Candidate	Votes	%	±%
Democratic	March Fong Eu	4,104,695	62.49%	
Republican	Jacob "Jay" Margosian	1,982,145	30.17%	
Peace and Freedom	David Wald	272,198	4.14%	
American Independent	Valerie C. Seeman	209,935	3.20%	
Majority		2,122,550		
Turnout				
Democratic hold		Swing		
