= 1974 California Secretary of State election =

- November 5, 1974
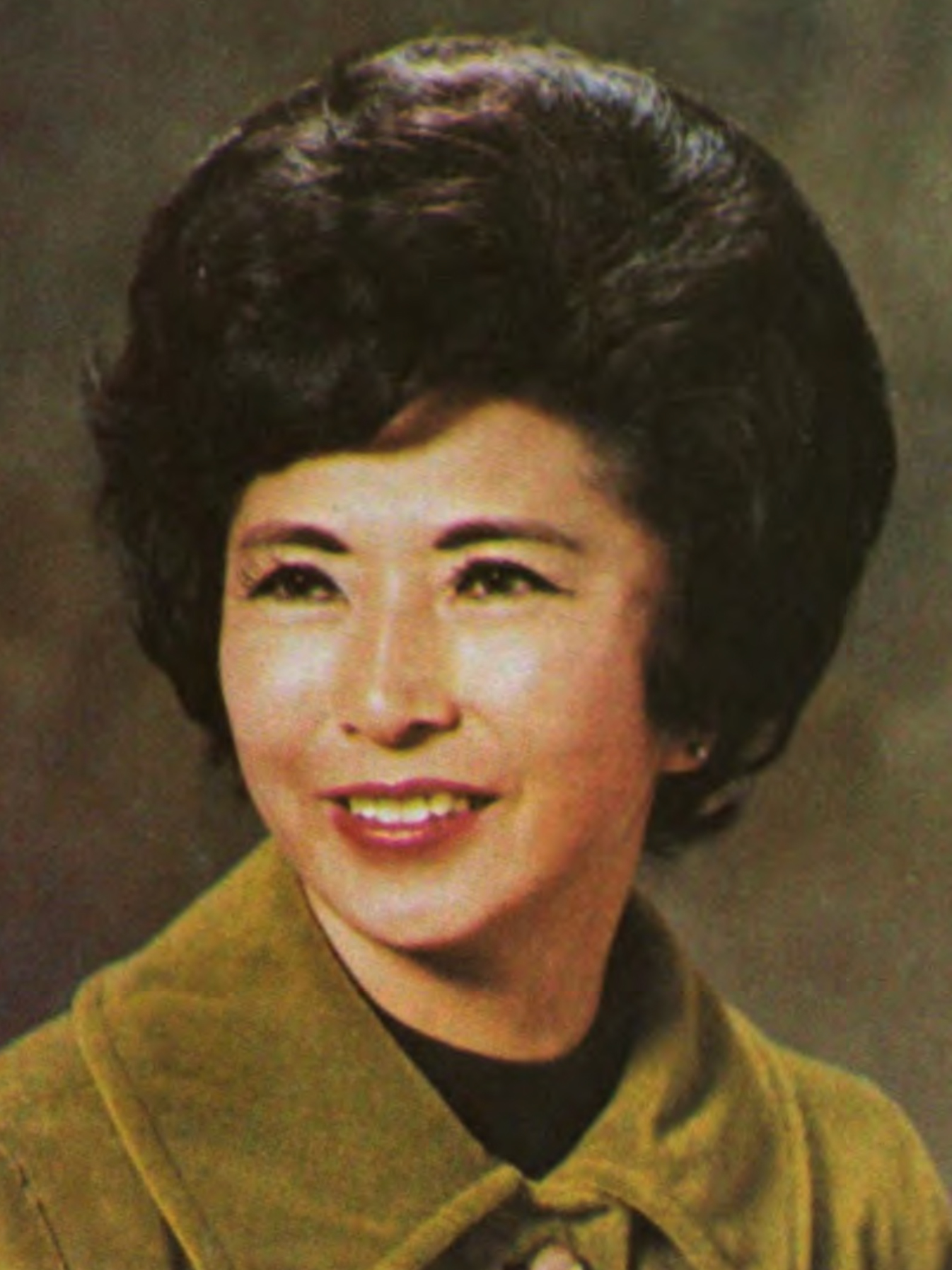

| Nominee | March Fong Eu | Brian Van Camp |
| Party | Democratic | Republican |
| Popular vote | 3,491,292 | 2,199,516 |
| Percentage | 57.93% | 36.50% |
- County results Fong Eu: 40–50% 50–60% 60–70% 70–80% Van Camp: 40–50%
Secretary of State before election
Jerry Brown
Democratic
Elected Secretary of State
March Fong Eu
Democratic

The 1974 California secretary of state election was held on November 5, 1974. Democratic nominee March Fong Eu defeated Republican nominee Brian Van Camp with 57.93% of the vote.

== Primary elections ==
Primary elections were held on June 4, 1974.

=== Democratic primary ===
==== Candidates ====
- Bruce Edward Brant
- March Fong Eu, state assemblywoman
- Robert S. Jordan
- Walter J. Karabian, state assemblyman
- Catherine O'Neill
- Herman Sillas

==== Results ====
Democratic primary results
| Party | Candidate | Votes | % |
|---|---|---|---|
| Democratic | March Fong Eu | 745,508 | 28.88 |
| Democratic | Walter J. Karabian | 697,513 | 27.02 |
| Democratic | Catherine O'Neill | 648,495 | 25.12 |
| Democratic | Robert S. Jordan | 185,488 | 7.19 |
| Democratic | Herman Sillas | 165,576 | 6.41 |
| Democratic | Bruce Edward Brant | 138,969 | 5.38 |
| Total votes | | 2,581,549 | 100.00 |

=== Republican primary ===
==== Candidates ====
- Willard C. "Bill" Fonda
- Wendell T. Handy
- Michael B. Montgomery
- James L. Shinn
- Brian Van Camp

==== Results ====
Republican primary results
| Party | Candidate | Votes | % |
|---|---|---|---|
| Republican | Brian Van Camp | 516,208 | 33.94 |
| Republican | Michael B. Montgomery | 344,720 | 22.66 |
| Republican | James L. Shinn | 269,495 | 17.72 |
| Republican | Wendell T. Handy | 216,523 | 14.23 |
| Republican | Willard C. "Bill" Fonda | 174,205 | 11.45 |
| Total votes | | 1,521,151 | 100.00 |

== General election ==
=== Candidates ===
Major party candidates

- March Fong Eu, Democratic
- Brian Van Camp, Republican

Other candidates

- Kay McGlachlin, Peace and Freedom
- Charles C. Ripley, American Independent

=== Results ===
1974 California secretary of state election
| Party | Candidate | Votes | % | ±% |
|---|---|---|---|---|
| Democratic | March Fong Eu | 3,491,292 | 57.93% | |
| Republican | Brian Van Camp | 2,199,516 | 36.50% | |
| American Independent | Charles C. Ripley | 203,890 | 3.38% | |
| Peace and Freedom | Kay McGlachlin | 131,896 | 2.19% | |
| Majority | | 1,291,776 | | |
| Turnout | | | | |
| Democratic hold | | Swing | | |
