= 1998 California Secretary of State election =

- November 3, 1998
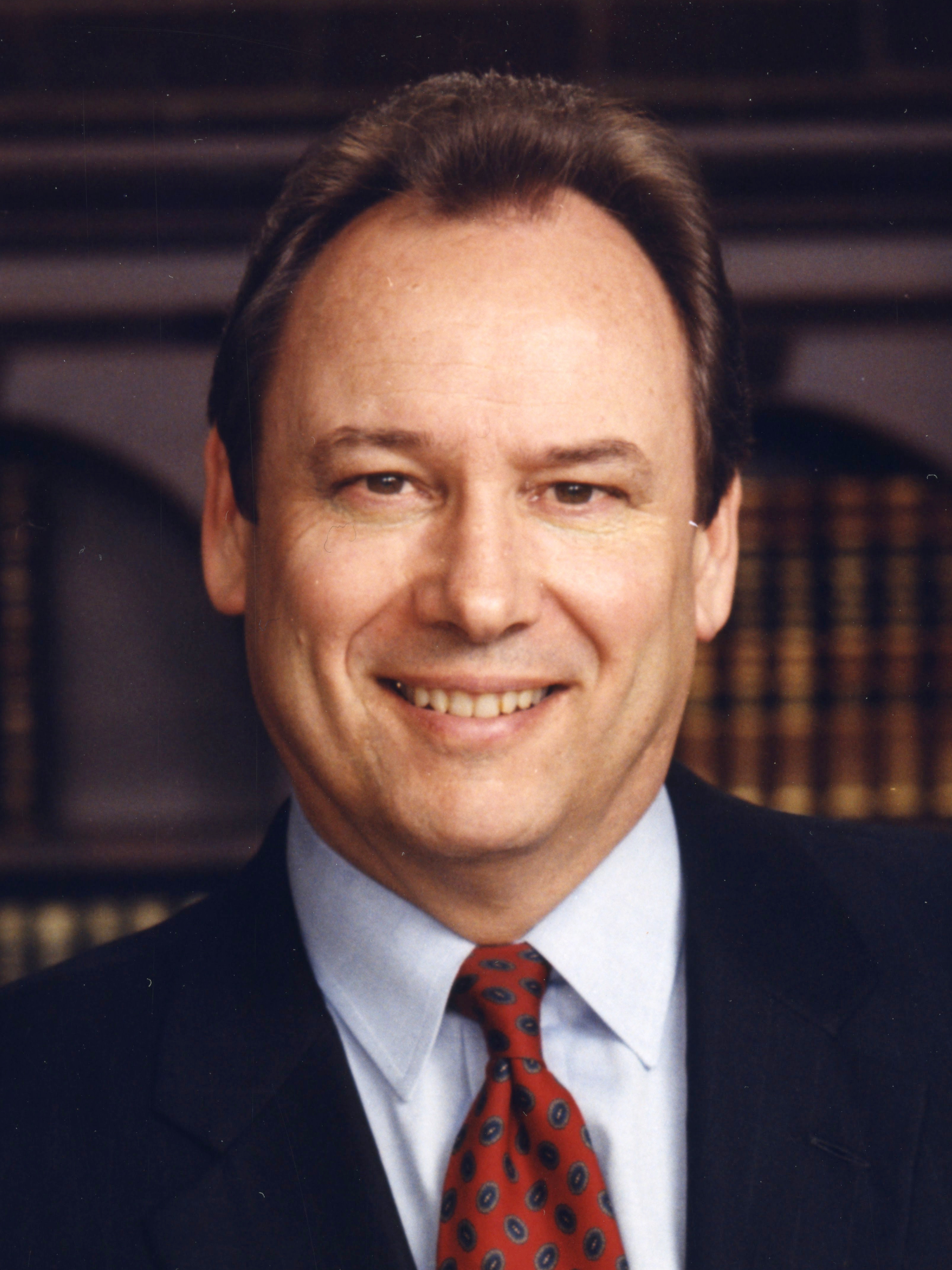

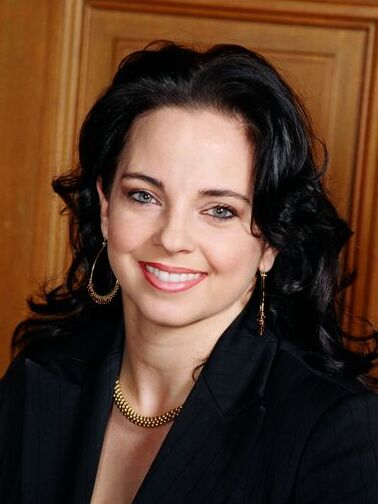
Nominee	Bill Jones	Michela Alioto
Party	Republican	Democratic
Popular vote	3,785,069	3,695,344
Percentage	47.00%	45.89%
- County results Jones: 40–50% 50–60% 60–70% Alioto: 40–50% 50–60% 60–70% 70–80%
Sec. of State before election
Bill Jones
Republican
Elected Sec. of State
Bill Jones
Republican

The 1998 California Secretary of State election occurred on November 3, 1998. The primary elections took place on June 3, 1998. The Republican incumbent, Bill Jones, narrowly defeated the Democratic nominee, Michela Alioto. As of 2022, this was the last time a Republican was elected California Secretary of State.

== Primary results ==
Final results from California Secretary of State.

=== Peace & Freedom ===
California Secretary of State Peace & Freedom primary, 1998
Candidate	Votes	%
Israel Feuer	64,063	50.20
Marisa Helene Palyvos-Story	63,546	49.80
Total votes	127,609	100.00

=== Others ===
California Secretary of State primary, 1998 (Others)
Party	Candidate	Votes	%
Republican	Bill Jones	2,615,933	100.00
Democratic	Michela Alioto	2,043,616	100.00
Libertarian	Gail Lightfoot	183,963	100.00
Natural Law	Jane Ann Bialosky	103,320	100.00
American Independent	Carolyn Rae Short	82,014	100.00
Reform	Valli Sharpe-Geisler	67,172	100.00
Green	Israel Feuer (write-in)	22	100.00

== General election results ==
Final results from the Secretary of State of California.

1998 Secretary of State election, California
Party	Candidate	Votes	%
Republican	Bill Jones (incumbent)	3,785,069	47.00
Democratic	Michela Alioto	3,695,344	45.89
Libertarian	Gail Lightfoot	216,853	2.69
Natural Law	Jane Ann Bialosky	103,631	1.29
American Independent	Carolyn Rae Short	100,265	1.25
Peace and Freedom	Israel Feuer	78,837	0.98
Reform	Valli Sharpe-Geisler	72,949	0.91
Invalid or blank votes		477,780	5.54
Total votes		8,529,948	100.00
Turnout			41.32
Republican hold			

=== Results by county ===
Final results from the Secretary of State of California.

County	Jones	Votes	Alioto	Votes	Lightfoot	Votes	Others	Votes
Tulare	66.29%	47,656	29.17%	20,973	1.82%	1,308	2.72%	1,953
Madera	64.30%	16,616	29.32%	7,578	3.15%	813	3.23%	835
Glenn	63.77%	4,667	29.05%	2,126	2.66%	195	4.52%	331
Sutter	63.31%	13,566	30.39%	6,511	2.35%	504	3.95%	846
Modoc	62.83%	2,140	28.21%	961	3.20%	109	5.75%	196
Colusa	61.81%	2,916	32.17%	1,518	2.33%	110	3.69%	174
Fresno	60.88%	100,967	33.61%	55,732	2.09%	3,468	3.42%	5,670
Orange	60.82%	417,101	31.98%	219,292	2.90%	19,886	4.31%	29,540
Kern	60.76%	83,861	31.37%	43,303	3.37%	4,651	4.50%	6,214
Placer	60.64%	52,309	31.83%	27,460	3.69%	3,187	3.83%	3,304
Mariposa	60.26%	4,214	31.06%	2,172	4.50%	315	4.18%	292
El Dorado	59.60%	33,431	32.74%	18,363	3.53%	1,981	4.14%	2,320
Shasta	59.57%	30,860	32.44%	16,804	3.17%	1,642	4.82%	2,498
Inyo	59.38%	3,884	32.00%	2,093	3.46%	226	5.17%	338
Lassen	59.02%	4,757	31.69%	2,554	3.37%	272	5.92%	477
Plumas	58.95%	4,909	33.76%	2,811	3.06%	255	4.23%	352
Sierra	58.42%	985	30.07%	507	5.22%	88	6.29%	106
Kings	58.02%	12,769	35.44%	7,800	2.19%	482	4.35%	958
Tehama	57.91%	10,408	33.20%	5,967	3.34%	601	5.54%	996
Nevada	57.90%	21,830	34.80%	13,121	3.00%	1,132	4.29%	1,619
Amador	57.03%	7,427	36.62%	4,769	3.10%	404	3.24%	422
Mono	56.62%	1,881	34.95%	1,161	4.39%	146	4.03%	134
Butte	55.70%	35,597	35.87%	22,923	3.09%	1,977	5.33%	3,407
San Luis Obispo	55.24%	45,957	37.51%	31,209	3.25%	2,707	3.99%	3,320
Siskiyou	55.02%	8,838	36.83%	5,916	3.47%	558	4.67%	750
Yuba	54.85%	7,187	36.48%	4,780	3.34%	437	5.33%	698
Calaveras	54.39%	8,551	36.00%	5,660	5.47%	860	4.13%	650
Del Norte	54.15%	3,888	36.28%	2,605	3.31%	238	6.25%	449
San Diego	54.07%	378,508	38.26%	267,842	2.98%	20,877	4.68%	32,793
Riverside	53.72%	175,820	38.66%	126,525	2.85%	9,313	4.78%	15,628
Tuolumne	53.65%	10,493	38.99%	7,625	3.37%	660	3.98%	779
Ventura	53.62%	107,178	38.16%	76,262	3.08%	6,159	5.14%	10,267
Stanislaus	52.49%	51,195	41.81%	40,779	2.42%	2,356	3.28%	3,197
Merced	52.12%	20,202	42.25%	16,376	1.94%	752	3.70%	1,433
San Bernardino	51.75%	165,958	40.46%	129,745	2.95%	9,450	4.84%	15,515
Alpine	51.47%	281	36.08%	197	3.48%	19	8.97%	49
Sacramento	51.44%	179,866	42.37%	148,171	2.35%	8,210	3.85%	13,446
Santa Barbara	51.21%	60,686	40.99%	48,583	2.89%	3,423	4.91%	5,820
Trinity	51.07%	2,474	35.84%	1,736	5.43%	263	7.66%	371
San Joaquin	50.52%	61,558	43.00%	52,391	2.46%	2,992	4.03%	4,911
Napa	49.32%	20,434	42.33%	17,538	2.86%	1,187	5.49%	2,274
Humboldt	47.63%	21,315	39.76%	17,792	4.31%	1,931	8.30%	3,714
San Benito	44.70%	5,641	47.33%	5,973	2.77%	349	5.21%	658
Imperial	44.32%	10,065	46.18%	10,487	2.72%	617	6.79%	1,542
Lake	44.22%	8,154	48.77%	8,993	2.77%	510	4.24%	782
Monterey	43.67%	38,429	49.10%	43,211	2.49%	2,192	4.74%	4,171
Contra Costa	42.70%	125,085	51.25%	150,130	2.54%	7,446	3.51%	10,291
Santa Clara	41.68%	167,262	51.12%	205,142	2.81%	11,265	4.39%	17,617
Yolo	40.99%	19,921	52.74%	25,628	2.25%	1,093	4.02%	1,954
Mendocino	40.28%	11,154	48.24%	13,359	4.03%	1,115	7.45%	2,064
Solano	39.97%	39,533	53.82%	53,233	2.17%	2,144	4.05%	4,008
Los Angeles	39.81%	752,737	53.66%	1,014,648	2.34%	44,309	4.19%	79,194
Sonoma	39.76%	61,397	51.10%	78,902	3.32%	5,134	5.82%	8,980
Marin	39.73%	38,596	53.53%	52,006	2.41%	2,337	4.33%	4,211
San Mateo	38.03%	75,651	56.40%	112,194	2.17%	4,318	3.39%	6,749
Santa Cruz	34.00%	27,891	55.40%	45,450	3.92%	3,219	6.68%	5,479
Alameda	29.50%	108,071	62.88%	230,346	2.70%	9,887	4.93%	18,048
San Francisco	22.53%	50,342	70.46%	157,411	2.14%	4,774	4.87%	10,888

== See also ==
- California state elections, 1998
- State of California
- Secretary of State of California
