= Come Blow Your Horn (film) =

1963 American comedy film

- Theatrical release poster
- Directed by: Bud Yorkin
- Screenplay by: Norman Lear
- Based on: Come Blow Your Horn by Neil Simon
- Produced by: Norman Lear; Bud Yorkin
- Starring: Frank Sinatra; Lee J. Cobb; Molly Picon; Barbara Rush; Jill St. John
- Cinematography: William H. Daniels
- Edited by: Frank P. Keller
- Music by: Nelson Riddle
- Production companies: Tandem Productions; Essex Productions
- Distributed by: Paramount Pictures
- Release date: June 5, 1963
- Running time: 112 minutes
- Country: United States
- Language: English
- Box office: $12.7 million

Come Blow Your Horn is a 1963 American comedy film directed by Bud Yorkin from a screenplay by Norman Lear, based on the 1961 play of the same name by Neil Simon. The film stars Frank Sinatra, Lee J. Cobb, Molly Picon, Barbara Rush, and Jill St. John.

== Plot ==
Buddy Baker is bored living with his parents. He goes to the big-city apartment of older brother Alan, who works for their father's artificial-fruit company but never lets business interfere with a good time.

A confirmed bachelor, Alan is all too willing to teach his younger brother a few tricks, improve his wardrobe, even introduce him to Peggy, a girl with an apartment upstairs. Alan's steadiest companion is Connie, but even she's running out of patience with his lack of interest in settling down.

A jealous husband accuses Alan of running around with his wife and beats him up. Alan begins rethinking his life. He proposes marriage to Connie and then intervenes when he hears that his own parents are contemplating a divorce. Giving up his own ways for good, Alan even turns over his swinging bachelor pad to Buddy.

== Cast ==
- Frank Sinatra as Alan Baker
- Lee J. Cobb as Harry R. Baker
- Molly Picon as Mrs. Sophie Baker
- Barbara Rush as Connie
- Jill St. John as Peggy John
- Dan Blocker as Mr. Eckman
- Phyllis McGuire as Mrs. Eckman (buyer for Neiman-Marcus)
- Tony Bill as Buddy Baker

Norman Lear and Dean Martin both make cameo appearances in this film.

== Production ==
Carole Wells originally played Tony Bill's girlfriend, but her scenes were entirely removed from the final cut to reduce the film's running time.

== Reception ==
=== Box office performance ===
Come Blow Your Horn was the 15th highest-grossing film of 1963, grossing $12,705,882 in the United States, earning $6 million in domestic rentals.

=== Awards ===
The film was nominated for an Academy Award for Best Art Direction (Hal Pereira, Roland Anderson, Samuel M. Comer, James W. Payne). Sinatra, St. John, Picon and Cobb each earned Golden Globe nominations for their performances.
