= Pistols 'n' Petticoats =

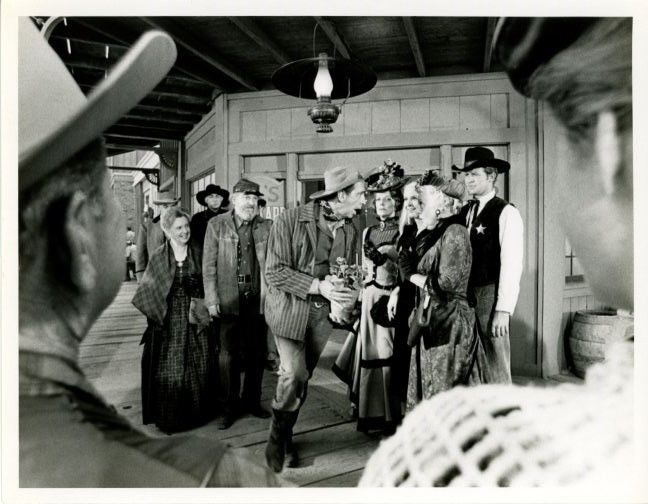
- The town drunk raises a stir with the Hanks family.
- Genre: Sitcom; Western; Satire
- Created by: George Tibbles
- Written by: Del Moore; George Tibbles; Paul West
- Directed by: David Alexander; Joe Connelly; Lawrence Dobkin; Leslie Goodwins; Harry Harris; Sidney Lanfield; Joseph Pevney; Alan Rafkin
- Starring: Ann Sheridan; Ruth McDevitt; Carole Wells; Douglas Fowley; Gary Vinson
- Theme music composer: Jack Elliott; George Tibbles
- Opening theme: "Pistols 'n' Petticoats"
- Composers: Jack Elliott; Stanley Wilson
- Country of origin: United States
- Original language: English
- No. of seasons: 1
- No. of episodes: 26

Production
- Producer: Joe Connelly
- Camera setup: Multi-camera
- Running time: 30 minutes
- Production companies: Kayro-UTV Productions; Universal Television

Original release
- Network: CBS
- Release: September 17, 1966 – March 11, 1967

Pistols 'n' Petticoats is an American Western sitcom starring Ann Sheridan that ran on CBS during the 1966–1967 television season. It was produced by Kayro/Universal Television for CBS Productions and ran from September 17, 1966, to March 11, 1967. The series was created by George Tibbles, who wrote the show's theme song. This was one of two sitcoms that ran on CBS with the "Petticoat" name in its title at the time, the other being Petticoat Junction, which was produced by Filmways and has no connection to this program. It was the worst rated show in the Nielsen ratings for the 1966–1967 TV season.

== Premise ==
Pistols 'n' Petticoats chronicled the lives of the gunslinging Hanks family, which consisted of Grandpa (Andrew), his wife Grandma (Effie), widowed daughter Henrietta, granddaughter (and Henrietta's daughter) Lucy, and their pet wolf Bowser. The "Petticoats" referred to the Hanks ladies, even though Lucy (who was raised in the city) would spend more time being at odds with the rest of the clan rather than helping protect their land.

The Hanks lived in the fictional town of Wretched, Colorado, in the year 1870, where at that time, the sprawling Old West was being occupied by outlaws. It was up to the Hanks family to clean up the town, which made them more popular with the citizens than with the town sheriff, Harold Sikes, who did not like having the spotlight shine on the Hanks. The Hanks also had adversaries with rival Buss Courtney and members of a nearby Indian tribe, led by Chief Eagle Shadow, and his assistants, Grey Hawk and Little Bear.

== Cast ==
- Ann Sheridan as Henrietta Hanks
- Ruth McDevitt as Grandma Effie Hanks
- Carole Wells as Lucy Hanks
- Douglas Fowley as Grandpa Andrew Hanks
- Gary Vinson as Sheriff Harold Sikes
- Robert Lowery as Buss Courtney
- Lon Chaney Jr. as Chief Eagle Shadow
- Marc Cavell as Grey Hawk
- Alex Henteloff as Little Bear
- Jay Silverheels as Great Bear
- Eleanor Audley as Mrs. Teaseley

== Guest stars ==
- Judy Canova as Sadie in "Faint Heart Never Won Grandpa" and "The Golden Fleece"
- Lon Chaney Jr. as Chief Lone Eagle in "The Gun Runners" (aka "Cards, Anyone?")
- Royal Dano as Virgil in "Petrified Wretched"
- Leo Gordon as Cyrus Breech in "The Gun Runners" (aka "Cards, Anyone?")
- Read Morgan as Moose Dreyfus in "The Triangle"
- Simon Scott as Sloan in "The Gun Runners" (aka "Cards, Anyone?")
- Lurene Tuttle as Adelaide Coulter in "Grandma's Date"
- Fred Willard as Ben in "Quit Shootin' Folks, It's Grandma"

== Production notes ==
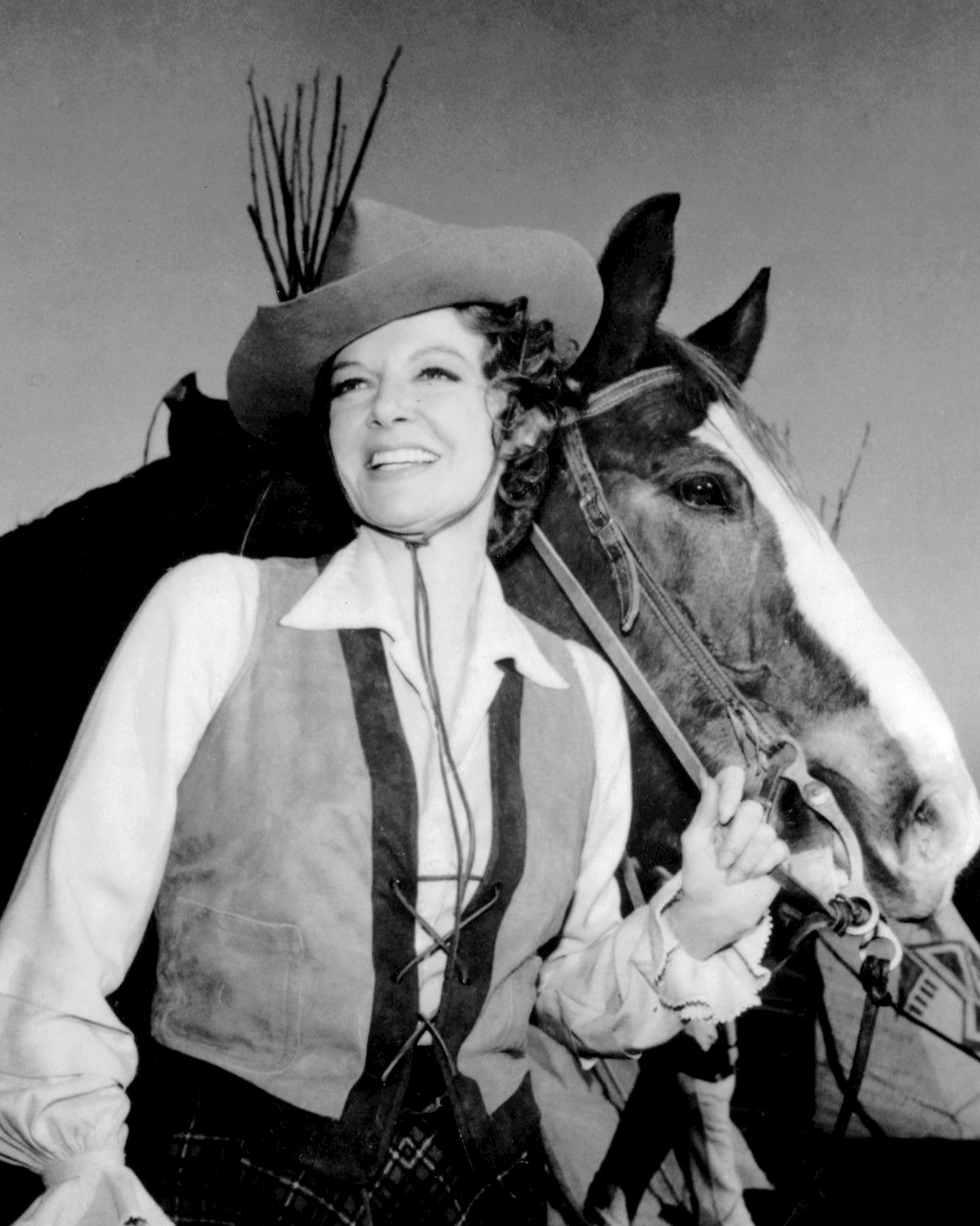
Ann Sheridan in 1966

The series would be Ann Sheridan's last role, as she died of cancer on January 21, 1967, nearly two months before CBS cancelled the series. Of the 26 shows that were produced, Sheridan only appeared in 21 episodes. Universal Pictures used several episodes as "archive footage" for the 1967 feature film The Far Out West.

In the pilot episode Chris Noel was cast as Sheridan's daughter, but test audiences found her portrayal unsympathetic; she was replaced by Carole Wells.

Both Universal Home Video and Echo Bridge Home Video hold the DVD rights to the series.

Pistols 'n' Petticoats was filmed in color, which, by the fall of 1966, became the standard in all prime-time network programming.

== Episodes ==
No. in season	Title	Directed by	Written by	Original release date
0	"Pilot"	Earl Bellamy	John McGreevey	UNAIRED
1	"A Crooked Line"	Unknown	Unknown	September 17, 1966
2	"No Sale"	Ezra Stone	Unknown	September 24, 1966
3	"Bitter Blossom O'Brien"	Sidney Lanfield	Lois Hire	October 1, 1966
4	"Sir Richard of Wretched"	Joseph Pevney	George Tibbles	October 8, 1966
5	"The Hank and the Indian War"	Unknown	Unknown	October 15, 1966
6	"The Triangle"	Harry Harris	Paul West	October 22, 1966
7	"A Wagonload of Wives"	Joe Connelly	Story by : Del Moore; Teleplay by : George Tibbles	October 29, 1966
8	"The Ross Guttley Story"	Alan Rafkin	George Tibbles	November 5, 1966
9	"The Gun Runners (aka Cards, Anyone?)"	Lawrence Dobkin	Bud Freeman	November 12, 1966
10	"Lookout Point"	Alan Rafkin	Unknown	November 19, 1966
11	"Quit Shootin' Folks, It's Grandma"	Earl Bellamy	Unknown	November 26, 1966
12	"Shootout at the O'Day Corral"	Leslie Goodwins	George F. Slavin & Stanley Adams	December 3, 1966
13	"Grandma's Date"	Unknown	Unknown	December 10, 1966
14	"Here Comes Trouble"	Alan Rafkin	Unknown	December 17, 1966
15	"Willie the Kid"	Ezra Stone	Lois Hire	December 24, 1966
16	"Wretched Beautiful"	Alan Rafkin	Unknown	December 31, 1966
17	"Faint Heart Never Won Grandpa"	Unknown	Unknown	January 7, 1967
18	"The Stranger"	Unknown	Unknown	January 14, 1967
19	"Beware the Hangman"	Unknown	Unknown	January 21, 1967
20	"A Man for Hank"	David Alexander	Paul West	January 28, 1967
21	"Petrified Wretched"	Ezra Stone	George Tibbles	February 4, 1967
22	"The Golden Fleece"	Ezra Stone	Lois Hire	February 11, 1967
23	"Peace Offering"	Unknown	Unknown	February 18, 1967
24	"The Taming of Sorry Water"	Ezra Stone	Unknown	February 25, 1967
25	"Colonel Comes to Town"	David Alexander	Unknown	March 4, 1967
26	"Harold's Double"	Joe Connolly	Suzanne Summers and Brad Thomas	March 11, 1967
