= Walter J. Karabian =

American politician

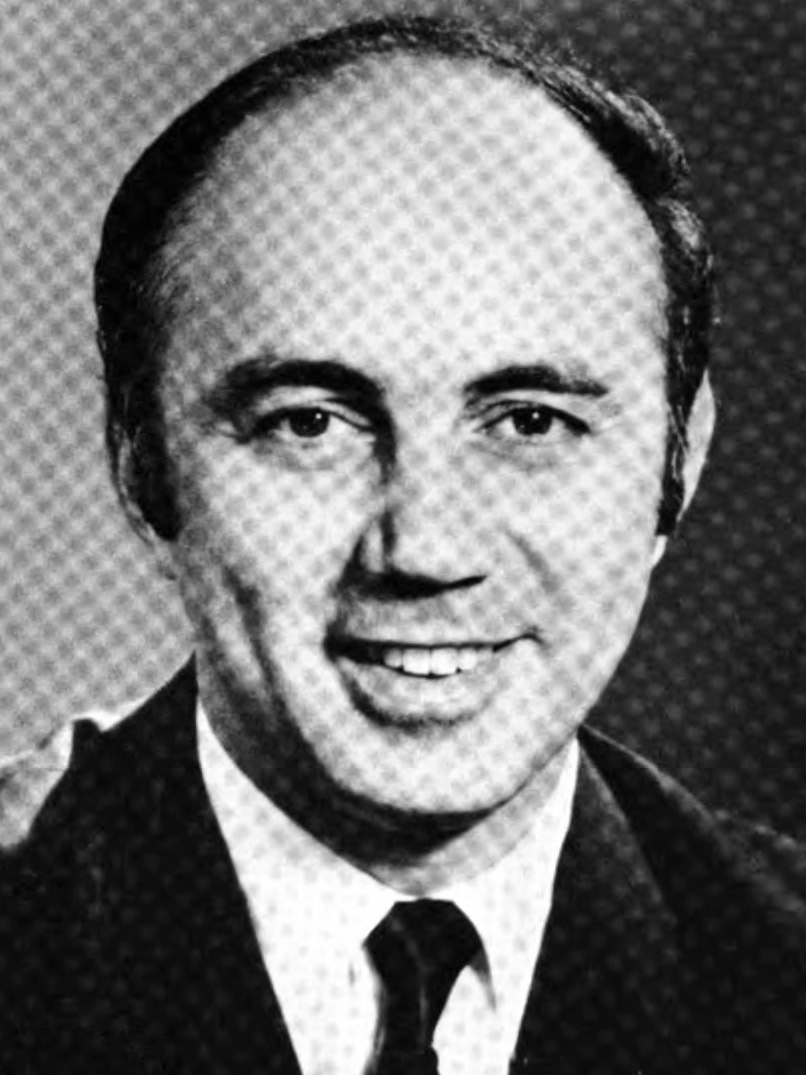
- Official portrait, 1971

Majority Leader of the California Assembly
- In office January 5, 1971 – March 1, 1972
- Preceded by: W. Craig Biddle
- Succeeded by: Jack R. Fenton

Member of the California State Assembly from the 45th district
- In office January 2, 1967 – November 30, 1974
- Preceded by: Alfred H. Song
- Succeeded by: Herschel Rosenthal

Personal details
- Born: Walter John Karabian; March 14, 1938 (age 88) Fresno, California, U.S.
- Party: Democratic
- Spouses: Carole Wells (m. 1977; div. 1984); Laurel Dickranian (m. 1988; died 2014)
- Children: 3
- Education: University of Southern California
- Occupation: Attorney

Walter John Karabian (born March 14, 1938) is an American politician in the state of California. He served in the California State Assembly as a Democrat from 1967 to 1974.

He was married to Carole Wells, a former actress.

== Early life ==
Karabian was born in Fresno, California, and graduated from Roosevelt High School in June 1956. After high school, Karabian attended the University of Southern California in Los Angeles. While studying at USC, Karabian was elected Student Body and Junior Class President. He was awarded his Bachelor of Arts in American History in 1960.

In 1963 Karabian graduated from the USC Law School and also obtained a Master of Science degree in Public Administration. Karabian took an early interest in politics, working for President Lyndon B. Johnson's reelection campaign in 1964.

After college, Karabian was a Deputy District Attorney for the County of Los Angeles and entered into private practice with John H. Karns, in Monterey Park.

== Political career ==
Karabian was elected to the State Assembly in 1966 as a representative for the 45th Assembly District in the West San Gabriel Valley region of Los Angeles County. Karabian represented the 45th District for the next eight years, continually winning reelection to the State Assembly.

As a Democratic leader, Karabian mentored many future members of the Assembly, including Richard Alatorre and Art Torres. Considering himself to be a progressive, Karabian authored bills that dealt with prison reform, education, civil rights, free speech, and the preservation of endangered species in California.

Karabian ran for Secretary of State in 1974 but was defeated in the primary by March Fong Eu.

== After politics ==
Since 1974, Karabian has practiced law for his firm, Karns and Karabian, in Los Angeles. Karabian was selected as the co-chairman of a trade delegation that visited Cuba during Jimmy Carter's presidency and was named as the legal counsel for a legislative delegation to the Philippines in 1979.

In 2009, he was arrested for allegedly running over a parking attendant before a USC football game at Los Angeles Coliseum. In November 2010, Karabian pleaded no contest to a charge of "disturbing the peace" and was required to serve 40 hours of community service and three years' probation.
