= Tony Miller (California politician) =

American politician

Secretary of State of California
- Acting
- In office May 17, 1994 – January 2, 1995
- Governor: Pete Wilson
- Preceded by: March Fong Eu
- Succeeded by: Bill Jones

Personal details
- Born: June 28, 1948 (age 77) Chester, California, U.S.
- Party: Democratic
- Spouse: Peter Pavey
- Education: University of California, Davis; UC Berkeley School of Law (JD)
- Profession: Lawyer

Anthony Miller (born June 28, 1948) is an American attorney and former California Secretary of State. A member of the Democratic Party, he served as Chief Deputy Secretary of State from 1981 to 1994 and then California Secretary of State from 1994 to 1995. Miller was a longtime public servant, Eagle Scout, and volunteer firefighter.

== Biography ==
Miller was raised in the small town of Chester, California. He was elected student body president at his high school. He graduated Phi Beta Kappa from the University of California, Davis in 1970 and in 1973 received his J.D. degree from the University of California (Boalt Hall) School of Law at Berkeley. Miller has also worked as a legislative aide, criminal investigator, and college instructor.

Miller served as chairman of the Plumas County Democratic Central Committee during law school, and subsequently as an appointed member of the state's newly created Fair Political Practices Commission (1975–76). Before becoming chief deputy to former Secretary of State March Fong Eu, Miller served as the Secretary of State's chief legal counsel (1976–81). In 1994, March Fong Eu resigned to become United States Ambassador to the Federated States of Micronesia, leaving Miller as Acting Secretary of State. As Chief Deputy Secretary of State, Miller built a solid reputation for smooth, efficient and fairly run statewide elections, and for the administration of one of the best-run agencies in state government. He ran for election to the post, winning the Democratic primary over Los Angeles Assemblywoman Gwen Moore and former Los Angeles City Councilman (1985-1993) and 1993 mayoral election runner-up Mike Woo, but lost in a very close general election to Bill Jones.

In 1998, Miller ran in the Democratic primary for Lieutenant Governor of California, but lost the nomination to the Assembly Speaker, Cruz Bustamante. Miller then returned to private practice.

After the Help America Vote Act (HAVA) was passed by Congress in 2002, Miller was appointed by California Secretary of State Kevin Shelley to lead the implementation of HAVA in California. In 2004, Miller served as special counsel to Shelley when Shelley was accused of misappropriating federal HAVA funds for his own purposes. Shelley eventually resigned in 2005.

Miller is a lifelong Californian, an avid runner, avid farmer, and craftsman. He is openly gay and has been in a relationship since 1973. He and his husband live on a small farm in Sutter County, near Sacramento.

Political offices
Preceded by March Fong Eu	California Secretary of State; 1994–1995	Succeeded by Bill Jones
