= Cathy Mitchell (politician) =

American politician

Acting California Secretary of State
- In office March 4, 2005 – March 29, 2005
- Governor: Arnold Schwarzenegger
- Preceded by: Kevin Shelley
- Succeeded by: Bruce McPherson

Personal details
- Party: Democratic
- Spouse: Terry Mitchell

Cathy Mitchell is an American politician and a member of the Democratic Party. She served temporarily as the California Secretary of State during the month of March in 2005. She was automatically elevated to the position when Kevin Shelley resigned the post, and served until the Governor's nomination of Bruce McPherson was confirmed in the California State Legislature.

Mitchell, is a veteran Secretary of State employee. She came to the office in 1981. She has most recently served as Undersecretary, having stepped into the role days before the November 2004 Presidential election. Formerly, she was the Chief of the Business Programs Division, the largest program within the agency.

Mitchell has held many positions within the office, including stints at the Archives, the press office, and ten years in the elections field. Although she also served as Deputy Chief during her tenure in the Elections Division, Ms. Mitchell’s field of expertise is California’s initiative and ballot measure processes.

Mitchell has a long association with The California Museum for History, Women and the Arts and the State Archives. She currently serves on the board of trustees of the museum.

She has a bachelor's degree from California State University, Sacramento and is a registered Democrat. Mitchell is a founding member of the Sacramento Women’s Action Network (SWAN), a group of women in the area who provide financial and other support to local charities. She lives in Sacramento with her husband, Terry.

The Chief Deputy Secretary of State, now known as the Undersecretary of State, automatically assumes the duties of the Secretary of State when a vacancy occurs in the office, pursuant to Government Code Section 1775. Governor Arnold Schwarzenegger however nominated Senator Bruce McPherson to become Secretary of State.

Political offices
Preceded by Kevin Shelley	California Secretary of State; 2005	Succeeded by Bruce McPherson
