= California Corporate Disclosure Act =

California legislation (signed 2002)

The California Corporate Disclosure Act was an act written by California Assemblyman Kevin Shelley and signed into law by California governor Gray Davis in September 2002. It became effective on 1 January 2003. The law required every publicly traded company that does business in California to disclose certain facts about its operations and executives to state regulators. The law required companies to file this information with the California Secretary of State's office.

== Provisions ==
The California Disclosure Act changed the substance and timing required to be filed with the California Secretary of State for all U.S. — as well as foreign — corporations that are either incorporated in California or that do business in California.
