= Carole Wells =

American actress (born 1942)

Carole Maureen Wells
- Born: August 31, 1942 (age 84); Shreveport, Louisiana, U.S.
- Education: Hollywood High School
- Occupations: actress; opera singer; producer; author
- Years active: 1956–present
- Known for: Come Blow Your Horn; The Cheap Detective; A Thunder of Drums; National Velvet; Pistols 'n' Petticoats
- Spouse: Edward Laurence Doheny IV (m. 1963; died 1973) Walter J. Karabian (m. 1977; div. 1984) Jerry Dean Vanier (m. 2000)
- Children: 4

Carole Wells (born August 31, 1942) is an American actress, opera singer, producer and author.

== Early years ==
The daughter of a doctor, Wells was born Carole Maureen Wells in Shreveport, Louisiana, the fourth of six children in her family. Her siblings were two brothers and three sisters. She graduated from Hollywood High School, where she was a sorority sister of future actress Linda Evans.

== Stage ==
Wells began acting with a role in a play at a little theater in Burbank, California, when she was 12 years old.

Described as a light soprano, Wells took opera lessons in the 1960s and expanded her repertoire to musical theater, performing in "musical productions of The Sound of Music, Call Me Madam with Ethel Merman ... Wildcat with Martha Raye, and State Fair with Roger Smith."

== Television and film work ==
Wells was selective with regard to working in television. She said: "There are certain things I don't want to do. I won't do a television series unless it's a real good one. You put too much into it for what you get out. It's hard to find a series that's good for a girl."

Wells played Edwina Brown in the NBC drama National Velvet (1960-1962) and Lucy Hanks in the CBS comedy Pistols 'n' Petticoats (1966-1967). She also was seen on The Brian Keith Show, Showcase 5 -- Something Special, Wagon Train, and Police Woman.

She appeared in the television series Medic, Father Knows Best, Bachelor Father, Maverick in "The Lass with the Poisonous Air," Fury, The Donna Reed Show, The Many Loves of Dobie Gillis, Wide Country, Laramie, Leave It to Beaver, Ben Casey, Arrest and Trial, Perry Mason, The Virginian, The Sixth Sense, Switch, McCloud, and 1st & Ten, among others.

She appeared in the films A Thunder of Drums, Come Blow Your Horn, The Lively Set, Zorro in the Court of England, The House of Seven Corpses, Funny Lady and The Cheap Detective.

== Books ==
- Amberella: An Action Hero Adventure
- Hijacked: An Eyewitness Account of Evil (MotherBird Productions, 14 September 2018, ISBN 978-1732490901

== Other work ==
Wells is partnered with Bemer Group, a manufacturer of devices that boost blood circulation.

== Personal life ==
Wells married Edward Laurence Doheny IV in June 1963. Doheny was an "oil scion," the great grandson of Edward Laurence Doheny, the first man to successfully drill an oil well in the Los Angeles City Oil Field. Edward Laurence Doheny IV died of an overdose of sedatives, deemed to be suicide, on 14 Feb 1973 (aged 30), in Santa Monica, California. They had two sons.

Later she married Walter J. Karabian, a member of the California House of Representatives. They had a son and a daughter.

In 1977, while she and Karabian were on an "around the world honeymoon", a Japan Airlines flight on which they were traveling (Japan Airlines Flight 472) was hijacked by Japanese terrorists who asked for a ransom of $6 million and release of nine terrorists from jail. After being released, Wells described the hijacking as "a terrible experience." She was pregnant at the time and later suffered a miscarriage, which her husband attributed to the trauma of the hijacking.
