= Bill Jones (California politician) =

American politician

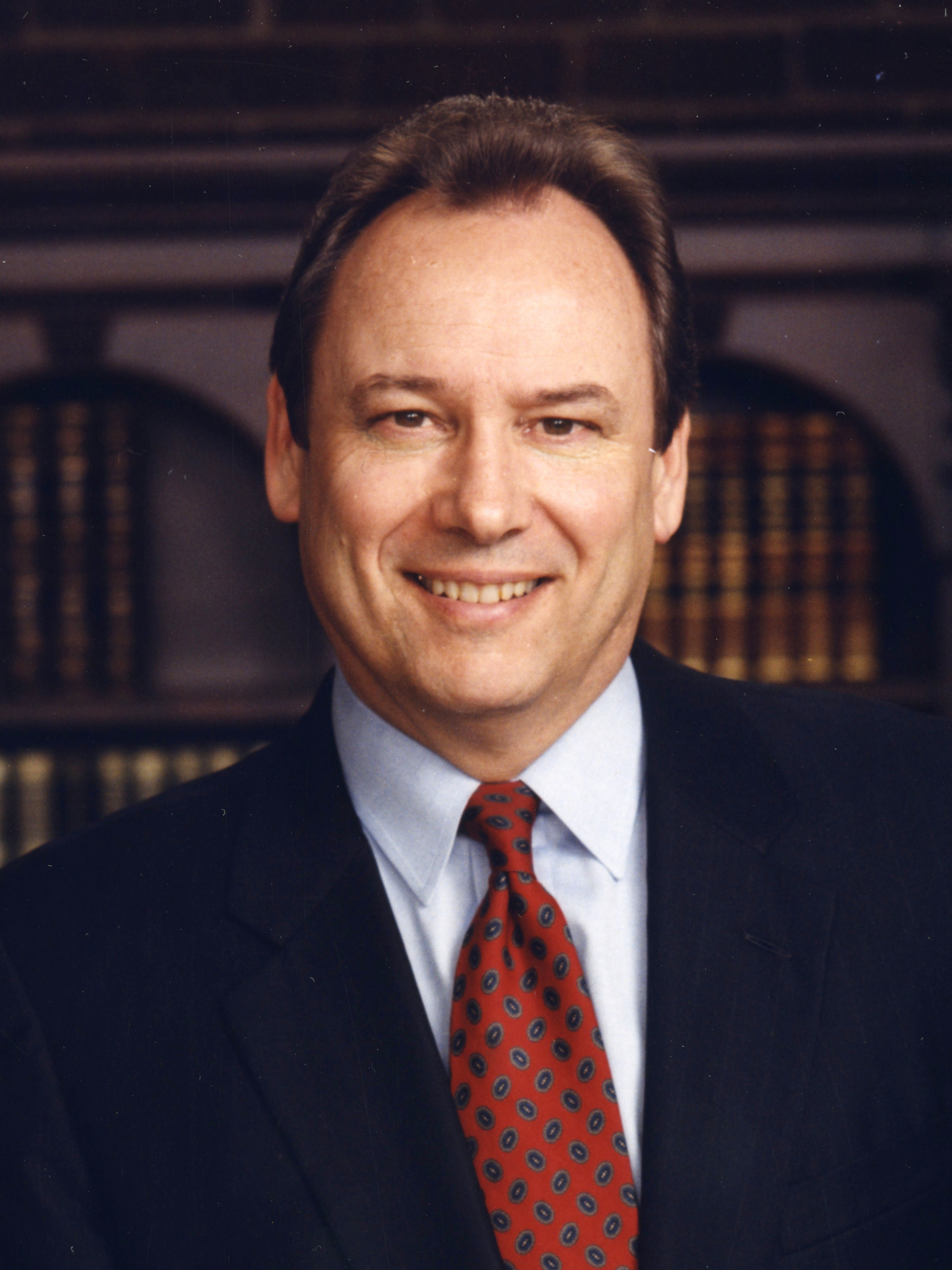
- Official portrait, 1995

25th Secretary of State of California
- In office January 2, 1995 – January 6, 2003
- Governor: Pete Wilson; Gray Davis
- Preceded by: Tony Miller
- Succeeded by: Kevin Shelley

Minority Leader of the California Assembly
- In office July 17, 1991 – November 4, 1992
- Preceded by: Ross Johnson
- Succeeded by: Jim Brulte

Member of the California State Assembly
- In office December 6, 1982 – November 30, 1994
- Preceded by: Gordon W. Duffy
- Succeeded by: Chuck Poochigian
- Constituency: 29th district (1992–1994); 32nd district (1982–1992)

Personal details
- Born: William Leon Jones; December 20, 1949 (age 76) Coalinga, California, U.S.
- Party: Republican
- Spouse: Maurine (m. 1971)
- Children: 2
- Education: California State University, Fresno (BS)

William Leon Jones (born December 20, 1949) is an American politician from California who served in the California State Assembly and later served as California's 25th Secretary of State for two terms from 1995 to 2003 under Governors Pete Wilson and later Gray Davis. He was an unsuccessful Republican candidate for Governor of California in 2002 as well as an unsuccessful candidate for the United States Senate from California in 2004 against incumbent Democrat Barbara Boxer. As of 2024, Jones is the last Republican to be elected to California Secretary of State to date.

== Early life and education ==
Born in Coalinga, California, Jones earned his bachelor's degree in agribusiness and plant sciences from California State University, Fresno in 1971.

== Member of the California State Assembly ==
In 1976, Jones began his political career with an unsuccessful run for the 31st District State Assembly seat against then State Senate aide and future Congressman Richard H. Lehman. Lehman defeated Jones by just under ten points and went on to represent the Fresno-based Assembly district for six years before being elected to the U.S. House. Jones spent those six years working as a farmer.

After the redistricting of 1982, Jones again sought a seat in the state legislature. This time, Jones soundly defeated Democrat Clyde Gould for California's 32nd Assembly District seat. Jones easily won reelection five times, carrying at least 69% of the vote in each election and twice running unopposed for the seat. Jones served in the Assembly from 1982 to 1994.

=== Proposition 184 ===
One of Jones's most notable contributions while in the Assembly was authoring Proposition 184, California's three-strikes law, which passed with 72%. In 2000, 61% of California voters supported Proposition 36, which scaled the three-strikes law back by supporting drug treatment instead of life in prison for many convicted of possessing drugs. During the November 2004 elections, Proposition 66, which would have further limited California's three-strikes law, was voted down at the polls by 53% of the voters.

=== Assembly leadership ===
For years, Jones was an intra-party adversary of Assembly Republican Leader Ross Johnson, and nearly ousted him from the party leadership. After authoring Proposition 184, Jones was elected the Assembly Republican Leader in 1991. In that capacity, Jones worked with the newly elected Republican Governor Pete Wilson, supporting Wilson's plans to limit gerrymandering and raise taxes to cut the budget deficit. Due to more competitive districts, Republicans expected large gains in the 1992 election. However, the coattails of Democratic Presidential nominee Bill Clinton and the general strength of the Democratic Party in California led to disappointing results for Republican candidates. After the Republicans' weak showing in the November 1992 elections, Jones stepped down as Republican Leader, despite having easily won re-election in his own district.

== California Secretary of State ==
Jones left the State Assembly after being elected Secretary of State, serving two terms in that office from 1995 to 2003. As the state's chief elections officer, Jones stated his goal was "100 percent participation but zero tolerance for voter fraud".

Use of the Internet was another priority of Jones's during his tenure as Secretary of State. In 2000, his office drafted a report stating that "California citizens should be online- not in line." His plan called for putting 90% of government services online by the expiration of his term while also "taking important steps toward closing the Digital Divide to ensure no Californians are left behind." Through use of technology, the Secretary of State's office registered or reregistered over 9 million voters, while purging 3 million ineligible voters from the rolls.

Jones was the first California Secretary of State to place campaign finance information on the Internet. In addition to providing instant Internet access to campaign finance reports, Jones launched the nation's first Internet site that carried live election returns on Election Day. Following the 2000 presidential election, Jones developed a 10-point election reform plan to modernize voting systems used in California. The plan was soon adopted as a national model for other states to use. However, it was controversial for allowing for wide and open adoption of Internet and electronic vote technology with many private vendors competing and few or no technical safeguards in common.

=== Role in suppressing vote pairing in October 2000 ===
During his tenure as California's Secretary of State, Jones may have played a role in the outcome of the 2000 presidential election, when he charged that vote pairing Internet web sites were illegal. Many of these web sites were hosted in California, and were shut down by October 31 after Jones threatened their creators with criminal prosecution.

The American Civil Liberties Union (ACLU) got involved to protect the web sites, seeking a restraining order, followed by a permanent injunction, against Jones, alleging that he had violated the constitutional rights of the web site creators. The issue could be resolved only after the 2000 election had already occurred. Later, the federal Ninth Circuit Court of Appeals ruled in favor of the legality of vote pairing.

== Run for California Governor ==
In 2002, Jones ran in the Republican gubernatorial primary, finishing third, with 16%, behind former Mayor of Los Angeles Richard Riordan and businessman William Simon, Jr., who went on to be defeated by incumbent Gray Davis in the general election.

Jones' campaign largely addressed issues of budget deficits, electrical shortages, and perceived corruption in the Davis administration. Building on his success promoting technology as Secretary of State, Jones's platform contained an eGovernment plank. However, much of his campaign concentrated on his past experience and support from state Republican luminaries like former Governor George Deukmejian, as opposed to specific plans for addressing the state's budget and energy crises.

=== E-mail spamming controversy ===
During his unsuccessful primary campaign, Jones' campaign manager drew criticism for spamming (sending bulk emails to) potential voters and others around the world. After the spamming incidents, Jones spokesman Darrel Ng denied spamming was wrong and strongly defended the use of mass email for campaigns as an "innovative way to use the Internet." The hosting provider of the Jones campaign web site terminated its services for the last few days of the campaign.

== Run for U.S. Senate ==
Following his unsuccessful run for governor in 2002, Jones tried a run for the U.S. Senate. Although he won the 2004 Republican primary over former U.S. Treasurer Rosario Marin, Jones lost the general election to Senator Barbara Boxer, with 38% of the vote. His campaign was so ill-funded that he did not run a single television commercial to promote his candidacy.

== Career after public office ==
As Secretary of State, Jones had been responsible for regulating the voting-related services of private companies. After leaving office, he became a paid consultant to one of those companies, Sequoia Voting Systems.

== Electoral history ==
Year	Office	Election	Subject	Party	Votes	%	Opponent	Party	Votes	%
1976	California State Assembly, District 31	General	Bill Jones	Republican	44,655	44.4%	Richard H. Lehman	Democratic	54,004	53.7%
1982	California State Assembly, District 32	General	Bill Jones	Republican	60,744	61.7%	Clyde Gould	Democratic	37,700	38.3%
1984	California State Assembly, District 32	General	Bill Jones	Republican	87,555	75.0%	Robert Dahlstedt	Democratic	29,206	25%
1986	California State Assembly, District 32	General	Bill Jones	Republican	70,825	100%	Unopposed			
1988	California State Assembly, District 32	General	Bill Jones	Republican	87,483	72.6%	Aden Windham	Democratic	33,081	27.4%
1990	California State Assembly, District 32	General	Bill Jones	Republican	71,592	68.8%	Bernie McGoldrick	Democratic	32,457	31.2%
1992	California State Assembly, District 29	General	Bill Jones	Republican	122,464	100%	Unopposed			
1994	California Secretary of State	General	Bill Jones	Republican	3,727,894	45.3%	Tony Miller	Democratic	3,690,841	44.8%
1998	California Secretary of State	General	Bill Jones	Republican	3,783,665	47.0%	Michela Alioto-Pier	Democratic	3,693,927	45.9%
2002	Governor of California	Primary	Bill Jones	Republican	387,237	17.0%	Bill Simon	Republican	1,129,974	49.5%
2004	U.S. Senate	General	Bill Jones	Republican	4,548,931	37.8%	Barbara Boxer	Democratic	6,947,021	57.7%

California Assembly
Preceded by Gordon W. Duffy	Member of the California State Assembly from the 32nd district 1982–1992	Succeeded by Trice Harvey
Preceded by Andrea Seastrand	Member of the California State Assembly from the 29th district 1992–1994	Succeeded by Chuck Poochigian
Preceded by Bill Jones	Minority Leader of the California State Assembly; 1991–1992	Succeeded by Jim Brulte
Political offices
Preceded by Tony Miller	Secretary of State of California; 1995–2003	Succeeded by Kevin Shelley
Party political offices
Preceded by Matt Fong	Republican nominee for U.S. Senator from California (Class 3); 2004	Succeeded by Carly Fiorina
