= Modular ammunition platoon =

The modular ammunition platoon is a US Army modular sustainment unit responsible for providing munitions support from all echelons of battle minus within a brigade combat team (which is supported by its own Modular Ammunition Transfer Point). The modular ammunition platoon is capable of operating within its parental modular ammunition company in tandem with up to four additional platoons, or it is capable of operating independently on its own. During extended platoon operations, the platoon leader is often given independent command authority. During independent operations, it is not uncommon for the platoon to receive additional support personnel or equipment.

Following a 2016 force design update, the platoon was redesigned into effective teams and squads that provide the required ammunition capability in a more efficient manner. In 2018, the platoon design was applied to the brigade combat team's Ammunition Transfer and Holding Point to create the new Modular Ammunition Transfer Point (MATP).
