= Michela Alioto-Pier =

American politician (born 1968)

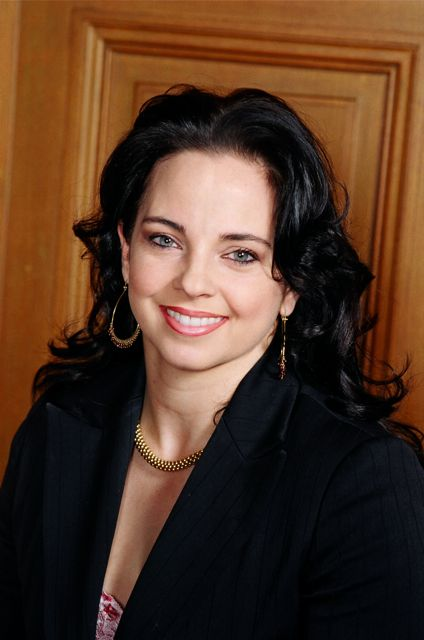
- Official portrait, 2004

Member of the San Francisco Board of Supervisors from the 2nd district
- In office January 26, 2004 – January 8, 2011
- Preceded by: Gavin Newsom
- Succeeded by: Mark Farrell

Personal details
- Born: Michela Alioto; April 29, 1968 (age 58) San Francisco, California, U.S.
- Party: Democratic
- Spouse: Tom Pier
- Relations: Joseph Alioto (grandfather); Angela Alioto (aunt); Michael J. Driscoll (grandfather)
- Children: Nicholas; Giovanna; Valentina
- Education: University of California, Los Angeles
- Occupation: Public servant

Michela Alioto-Pier (born April 29, 1968) is an American politician and small business owner who served as a member of the San Francisco Board of Supervisors from 2004 to 2011. A Democrat, she represented District 2, encompassing the Marina and Pacific Heights neighborhoods. She previously served as a member of the San Francisco Port Commission. She was appointed to the Board of Supervisors by Gavin Newsom after he was elected mayor, in 2003. Newsom himself was initially appointed to this seat by former mayor Willie Brown.

Alioto-Pier's paternal grandfather was former San Francisco mayor Joseph Alioto and her maternal grandfather was Michael J. Driscoll Sr., a former San Francisco port commissioner and former San Francisco supervisor. She is the niece of Angela Alioto, former president of the San Francisco Board of Supervisors. She is the most recent member of the Alioto family to hold an elected political office in San Francisco.

== Early life ==
Michela A. Alioto was born on April 29, 1968 in San Francisco, to Joseph M. Alioto and the former Michele Driscoll.

In 1981, at age thirteen, Alioto-Pier was paralyzed from the waist down when she fell from the Ridge Lift at Heavenly Valley Ski Resort in the Lake Tahoe area. At age seventeen, she was appointed by President Ronald Reagan to the advisory board of the President's National Council on Disability. Alioto-Pier later received a degree in anthropology from UCLA.

== Early political career ==
After working as an aide to Vice President Al Gore, Alioto-Pier made her first run for public office at 28 in 1996 against Republican Congressman Frank Riggs in California's 1st congressional district, which included Napa, Mendocino, and Humboldt counties, stretching along the coast up to the Oregon border. She won the Democratic nomination, but lost the general election. She is credited with mounting a strong campaign despite the loss. At the time, she ran under the name Michela Alioto.

Shortly after losing that election, Alioto-Pier announced that she would try again in 1998 but withdrew from the race in deference to fellow Democrat (and eventual winner) Mike Thompson. Instead, she ran for the office of California Secretary of State and won the Democratic nomination but ultimately lost against Republican incumbent Bill Jones. She again ran for Secretary of State in 2002, but lost the Democratic nomination to fellow San Franciscan Kevin Shelley, whose father preceded Alioto-Pier's grandfather as that city's mayor.

== San Francisco Board of Supervisors ==
In January 2004, Alioto-Pier was appointed by Mayor Gavin Newsom to his old seat in District 2 on the San Francisco Board of Supervisors. Although even-numbered districts were not slated for election until 2006, an off-year election was held for District 2 because Alioto-Pier was an appointed supervisor. She ran for the seat in the November 2004 election and won, and in 2006 she ran for a full term and won easily.

As a supervisor, Alioto-Pier was committed to the preservation of St. Brigid's Church, which was once slated for demolition. Another top priority for Alioto-Pier was earthquake preparedness, especially important for her district which was hit hard by the 1989 Loma Prieta earthquake. Alioto-Pier explained: "As the district representative for a community that was really hit in Loma Prieta, it is my responsibility to make sure if something like that happens again that we know what we're doing."

In May 2004, she introduced a payroll tax exemption for biotech companies in efforts to create a biotech cluster in San Francisco which was later passed by the full Board of Supervisors. As of 2019 San Francisco had over 250 biomedical companies.

As a San Francisco moderate, Alioto-Pier was attacked by San Francisco progressives for having a poor attendance record and mediocre constituent relations. One significant source of the criticism was over Alioto-Pier's attendance record while she was giving birth to her third child, which was a first for an elected official in San Francisco. Alioto-Pier responded by passing a family leave policy for elected officials in San Francisco.

In 2007 it was announced that St. Luke's, a hospital serving under-privileged communities, would be closed to acute and sub-acute patients and serve as an outpatient facility only. In January 2008, it was announced that Alioto-Pier would lead a panel of stakeholders to save St. Luke's. "Maintaining and rebuilding St. Luke's and developing it into a first-class hospital for the Mission District and the Southeast section of San Francisco is my primary objective." In response to the recommendations of the panel, in September 2008 California Pacific Medical Center (owner of St. Luke's) announced a reversal of their decision, stating that St. Luke's would be re-built to continue serving the communities that depend upon it.

On July 20, 2009, San Francisco Chronicle political columnists Phillip Matier and Andrew Ross broke the story of Alioto-Pier's announcement for state insurance commissioner.

Alioto-Pier, the granddaughter of former Mayor Joe Alioto and a protégée of former Vice President Al Gore, calls it "the most personal venture I've ever undertaken." Having been in a wheelchair since a skiing accident at age 13, she says, "I've easily had more personal experience with insurance companies than any of the other candidates."

Alioto-Pier subsequently left the race for insurance commissioner due to a leg injury.

=== Re-election challenge in 2010 ===
On June 3, 2010, Alioto-Pier submitted papers to register as a candidate for re-election to District Two of the San Francisco Board of Supervisors. San Francisco Department of Elections Director John Arntz issued a letter that same day in which he announced she was ineligible to run for re-election for District Two supervisor due to a 2008 ruling regarding term limits issued by City Attorney Dennis Herrera. Arntz wrote, "Accordingly, the Department of Elections cannot list you as a candidate for this office on the November 2, 2010 ballot or any other election materials for that election." She would have served on the Board of Supervisors for seven years when her term expired in January 2011. Supervisors are limited to serving two four-year terms.

The municipal ordinance providing for term limits was a matter of debate. Some claimed that the ordinance states that any person who has served more than one-and-a-half four-year terms in office (six years) shall be deemed to have effectively served for two full terms and thus be ineligible to seek re-election. Others claimed that the law is more nuanced and that one must be appointed to serve more than two years for it to count as a full term. Alioto-Pier was appointed to serve one year, ran for a two-year term, and then ran again for a four-year term. According to this view, the question is whether or not the year she served as an appointed supervisor and the truncated two years she served can be combined and rounded up to count as a four-year term.

Alioto-Pier challenged the ruling from the Department of Elections in Superior Court and won. In response, Herrera appealed that decision and overturned Alioto-Pier's victory, forcing her out of the 2010 election for District 2 Supervisor.

== Candidate for Mayor in 2011 ==
On February 7, 2011, Alioto-Pier filed as a candidate for mayor of San Francisco. In the November election, she placed ninth in a field of 16 candidates.

== Candidate for the California State Board of Equalization, District 2 ==
On March 10, 2022, Alioto-Pier filed as a candidate for the California State Board of Equalization, District 2.

Political offices
Preceded by Gavin Newsom	Member of the San Francisco Board of Supervisors; District 2; 2004-2011	Succeeded by Mark Farrell
