= March Fong Eu =

American politician (1922–2017)

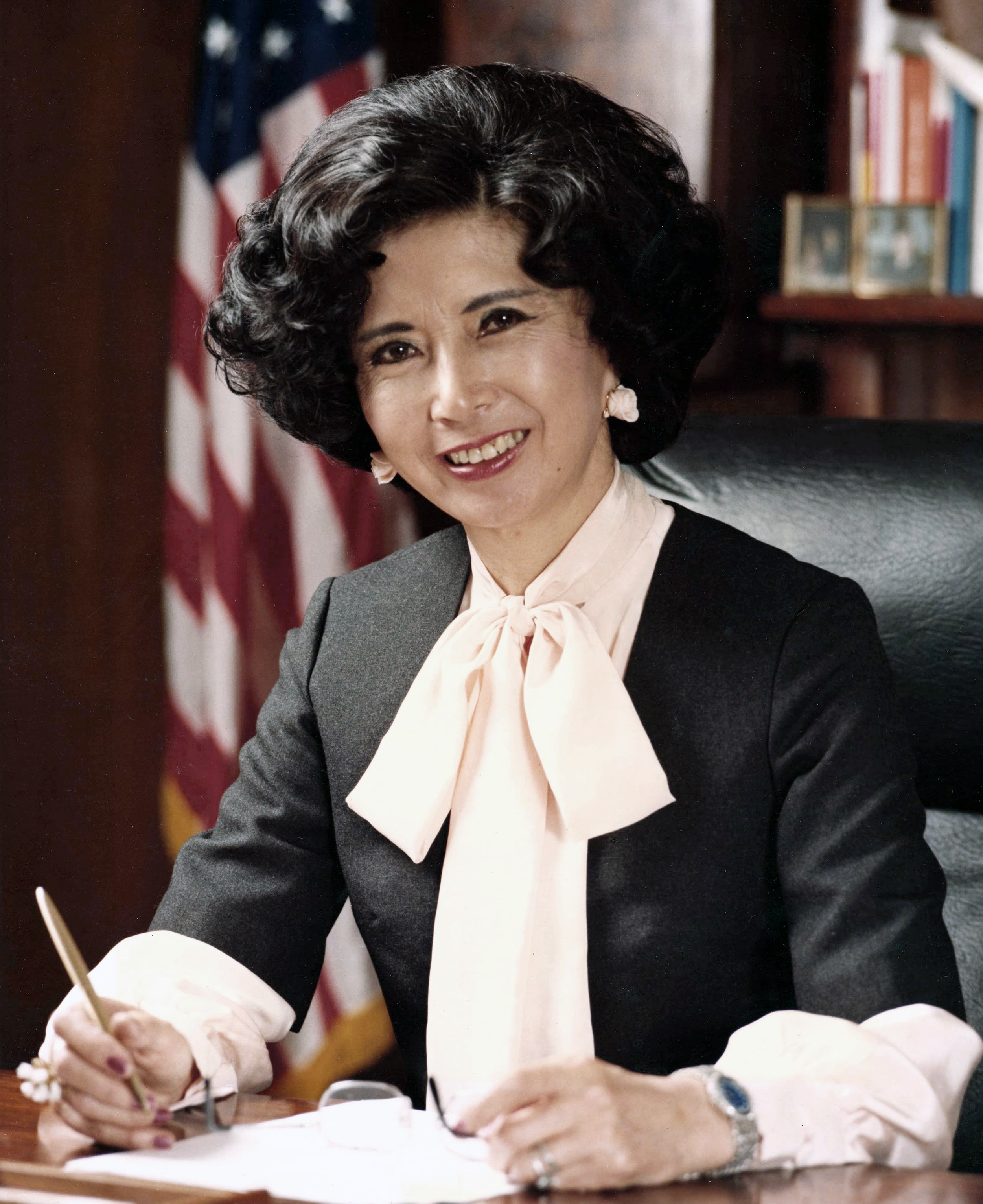
- Eu in the 1980s

United States Ambassador to Micronesia
- In office May 18, 1994 – July 5, 1996
- President: Bill Clinton
- Preceded by: Aurelia E. Brazeal
- Succeeded by: Cheryl Ann Martin

24th Secretary of State of California
- In office January 6, 1975 – May 17, 1994
- Governor: Jerry Brown; George Deukmejian; Pete Wilson
- Preceded by: Jerry Brown
- Succeeded by: Tony Miller

Member of the California State Assembly from the 15th district
- In office January 2, 1967 – November 30, 1974
- Preceded by: Nicholas C. Petris
- Succeeded by: S. Floyd Mori

Personal details
- Born: March Kong; March 29, 1922 Oakdale, California, U.S.
- Died: December 21, 2017 (aged 95) Irvine, California, U.S.
- Party: Democratic
- Spouses: Chester Fong (m. 1941; div. 1970) Henry Eu (m. 1973)
- Children: 2, including Matt
- Education: University of California, Berkeley (BA); Mills College (MEd); Stanford University (EdD)
- Occupation: Dental hygienist

Chinese name
- Chinese: 余江月桂
Transcriptions
Standard Mandarin
- Hanyu Pinyin: Yú Jiāng Yuèguì
Yue: Cantonese
- Jyutping: Jyu4 Gong1 Jyut6 Gwai3

March Fong Eu (née Kong; March 29, 1922 – December 21, 2017) was an American diplomat and politician who served as the 24th secretary of state of California for five terms from 1975 to 1994. A member of the Democratic Party, she served in the California State Assembly from 1967 to 1974 and later as the United States ambassador to Micronesia under Bill Clinton from 1994 to 1996.

The daughter of Chinese immigrants, Eu was the first Asian American woman to hold statewide constitutional office in the United States and was also the first woman to serve as secretary of state of California. She was the adoptive mother of Matt Fong, a Republican who served one term as treasurer of California.

== Early life and education ==
Eu was born March Kong on March 29, 1922, in Oakdale, California, a city in the San Joaquin Valley, where her Chinese immigrant parents Yuen Kong and Shiu Shee ran a hand-wash laundry. Her grandparents immigrated to the U.S. from Huaxian County (now Huadu District) in the South China province of Guangdong. The family later moved to Richmond, California.

Eu earned a Bachelor of Science in dental hygiene from the University of California, Berkeley in 1943 and a Master of Education from Mills College. She earned an Ed.D. from the Stanford Graduate School of Education in 1954.

== Career ==
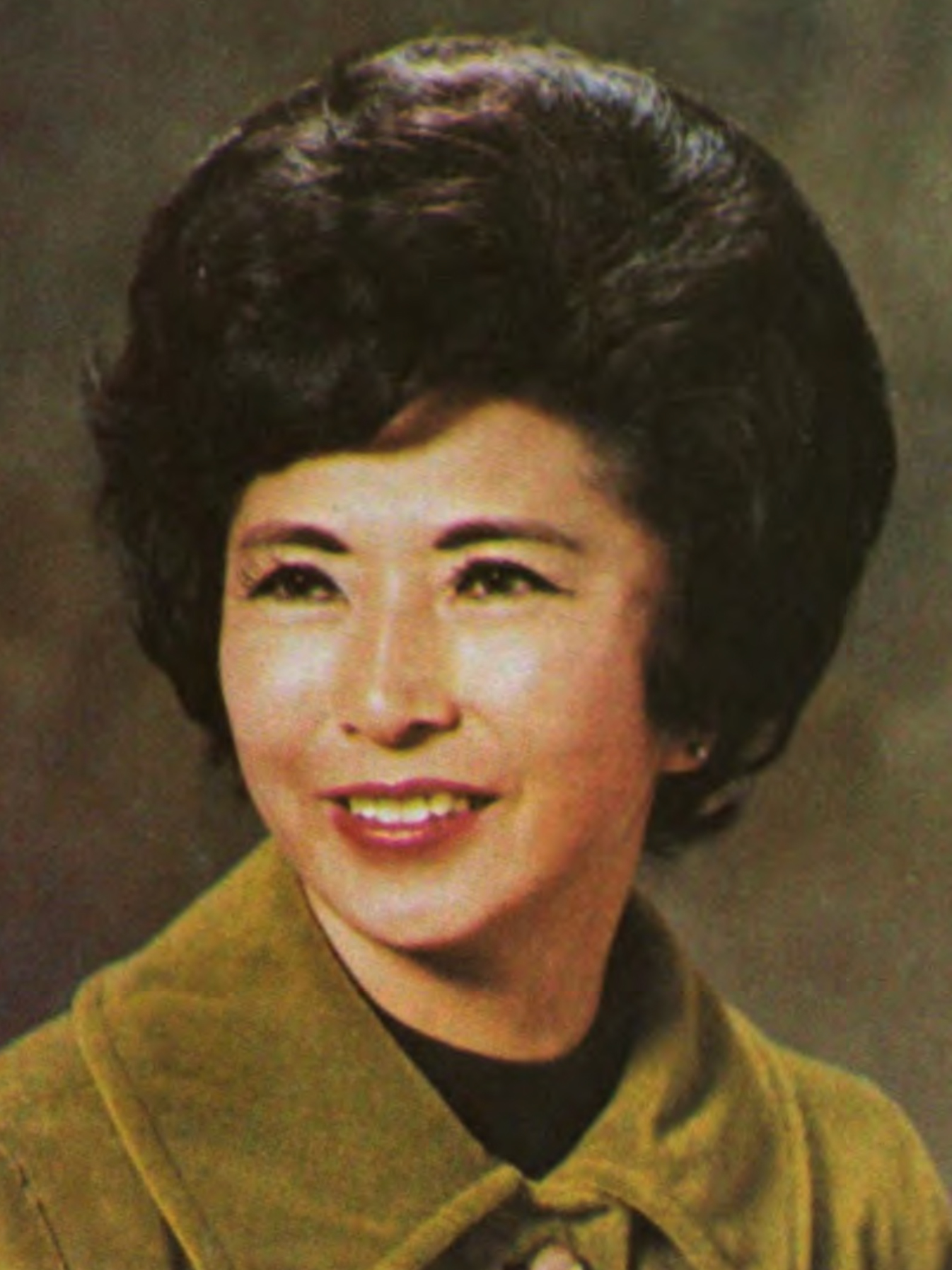
Eu in 1975 during her first term as secretary of state of California

She became a dental hygienist working in the Oakland Unified School District and served a term as president of the American Dental Hygienist Association. She served on the Alameda County Board of Education from 1954 to 1964.

=== California State Assembly ===
In 1966, Eu was elected as a Democrat to the California State Assembly from the 15th District, representing Oakland and Castro Valley. She served four terms. She was perhaps best known for her successful campaign to ban pay toilets, arguing that they discriminated against women since urinals were free.

=== California secretary of state ===
Eu was elected secretary of state of California in 1974, becoming the first Asian American woman ever elected to a state constitutional office in the United States. She remained the only woman to serve as California secretary of state until 2006, when voters elected Debra Bowen. Eu was elected Secretary of State five times. In 1978 she won every county in the state, even heavily Republican Orange County, making her one of only five Democrats to win the county in a statewide race in the last half century. She resigned in 1994 when President Bill Clinton nominated her for an ambassadorship.

Innovations she introduced during her 19 years as secretary of state included voter registration by mail; providing absentee ballots to anyone who requested them; posting results on the Internet; and including candidate statements in ballot pamphlets. In 1976, she became the first woman to serve as governor of California, serving as acting governor while Governor Jerry Brown was out of the state.

=== Later career ===
In 1987, Eu was a candidate for the Democratic nomination for the U.S. Senate, running against Leo McCarthy for the right to challenge the Republican incumbent, Pete Wilson. Amid poor fundraising totals and her husband's unwillingness to release details of his business interests, Eu dropped out later that year.

President Bill Clinton appointed Eu as United States Ambassador to the Federated States of Micronesia in 1994. She served in that post until 1996, when she resigned to work on Clinton's re-election campaign.

Eu campaigned for her son Matt in the 1998 U.S. Senate election, when he was the Republican nominee against incumbent Democratic senator Barbara Boxer. In 2002, Eu, then age 79, ran again for secretary of state, saying she was doing so because "Florida made me angry", referring to the voting problems in Florida during the 2000 United States presidential election. She lost in the Democratic primary to Kevin Shelley, who went on to win the election.

== Personal life and death ==
Eu resided both in California and Singapore with her second husband Henry Eu, a multimillionaire industrialist.

Eu was assaulted by a burglar who broke into her Hancock Park home in 1986.

Her adopted son, Matt Fong, was a Republican activist who served as California state treasurer for a four-year term that began January 1995. She also had a daughter, Suyin. Her hobbies in retirement included Chinese brush painting and calligraphy.

Eu died in Irvine, California, on December 21, 2017, following a fall; she was 95 years old.

== Recognition ==
In 2019 California's Secretary of State building in Sacramento was named after Eu (as the March Fong Eu Secretary of State Building); this made it the first state-owned building to be named for an Asian-American woman.

The National Notary Association gives an annual March Fong Eu Award to "the individual who or organization that, in the judgment of the Association's Executive Committee, has done the most to improve the standards, image and quality of the office of Notary Public." Eu was the first recipient of the award in 1979, named after her "for her extraordinary leadership in spearheading enactment of progressive Notary reform legislation, despite opposition from powerful lobbies who preferred lower notarial standards."

California Assembly
Preceded by Nicholas C. Petris	California State Assemblywoman, 15th District; 1967–1974	Succeeded by S. Floyd Mori
Political offices
Preceded by Jerry Brown	California Secretary of State; 1975–1994	Succeeded by Tony Miller
Diplomatic posts
Preceded by Aurelia Erskine Brazeal	U.S. Ambassador to Micronesia; 1994-1996	Succeeded by Cheryl A. Martin
