= Kevin Shelley =

American politician

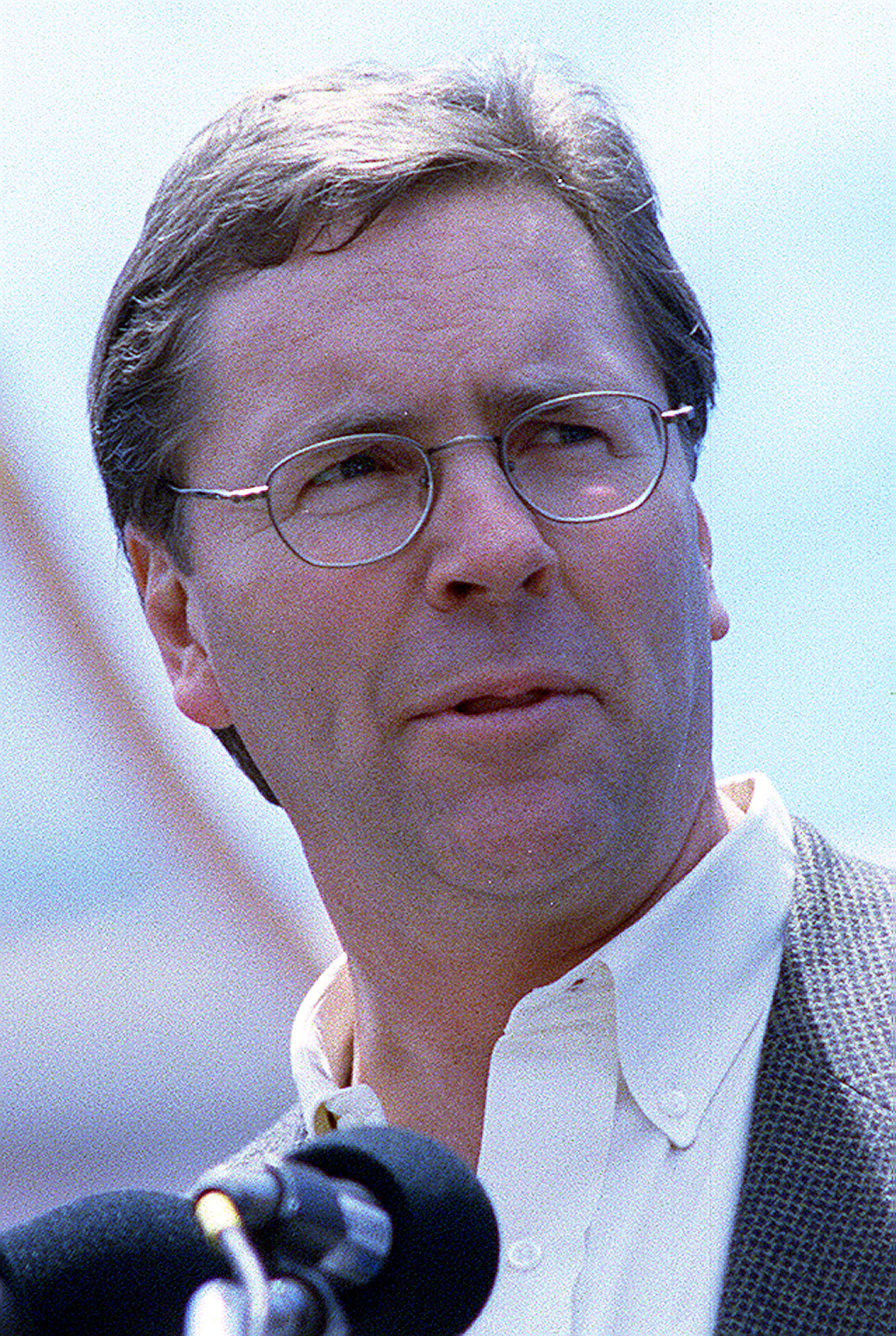

26th Secretary of State of California
- In office January 6, 2003 – March 4, 2005
- Governor: Gray Davis; Arnold Schwarzenegger
- Preceded by: Bill Jones
- Succeeded by: Cathy Mitchell

Majority Leader of the California Assembly
- In office March 19, 1998 – February 7, 2002
- Preceded by: Antonio Villaraigosa
- Succeeded by: Wilma Chan

Member of the California State Assembly from the 12th district
- In office December 2, 1996 – November 30, 2002
- Preceded by: John Burton
- Succeeded by: Leland Yee

Member of the San Francisco Board of Supervisors
- In office January 8, 1991 – December 2, 1996
- Preceded by: Richard Hongisto
- Succeeded by: Gavin Newsom

Personal details
- Born: Kevin Francis Shelley; November 16, 1955 (age 70) San Francisco, California, U.S.
- Party: Democratic

Kevin Francis Shelley (born November 16, 1955) is an American politician, who was the 26th California Secretary of State from January 6, 2003, until his resignation on March 4, 2005.

== Early life ==
Shelley was raised in San Francisco, the only son in a family of five. His father, Jack Shelley, was a State Senator, member of the U.S. House of Representatives, and Mayor of San Francisco.

Shelley graduated from St. Ignatius College Preparatory in 1973. He received his B.A. in political science from the University of California, Davis. He obtained his J.D. from University of California, Hastings College of the Law. He joined the staff of Congressman Phillip Burton and continued in his position when Sala Burton assumed her husband's seat after his death.

== Political career ==
In 1990, Shelley was elected to the San Francisco Board of Supervisors. In 1996, he won a seat in the California State Assembly. He wrote clinic protection ordinances and sunshine laws to make government more accountable. He authored the Marine Life Protection Act that protects coastal ecosystems, the California Nursing Home Reform Act to protect the elderly, and the Healthy Schools Act to protect children from pesticides. He created a voting reform package that includes a Voters' Bill of Rights and allows each voter to permanently vote by mail. Term limits prevented Shelley from seeking a fourth term as an Assemblyman in 2002, so he sought election as California's Secretary of State, the state's chief elections official.

=== Recall election ===
Within weeks of Shelley's taking office as Secretary of State, petitions were filed to recall Governor Gray Davis, a fellow Democrat. Six months after taking office, Shelley had to certify that there were enough signatures on these petitions to mandate the 2003 gubernatorial recall election, the first such election in state history. As Secretary of State, Shelley was responsible for overseeing that statewide special election.

Shelley was generally credited with good work on his handling of the 2003 recall election and on his handling of the controversy over the verifiability of electronic voting machines. He was the first state election official to decertify DRE voting machine systems already in use, to require all DRE voting machine systems to contain an accessible paper copy of a person's vote, and to adopt standards and security measures for such systems. He initiated an investigation into electronic voting machine manufacturer Diebold Election Systems (now Premier Election Solutions), and at the conclusion of the investigation, requested that then-State Attorney General Bill Lockyer investigate Diebold for criminal fraud.

=== Scandals ===
A number of former staffers and other associates came forward and accused Shelley of abusive behavior toward his staff.

Other accusations surfaced charging Shelley had received allegedly laundered campaign funds during his race for Secretary of State. Shelley maintained that he did not know that the funds were illicitly transferred to his campaign treasury. (After an investigation, then-state Attorney General Bill Lockyer publicly exonerated Shelley, saying he was innocent of any wrongdoing in connection with the case.)

On October 29, 2004, Shelley replaced three of his top aides, including the assistant state secretary of communications, with veteran civil servants, in an effort to bring more accountability to his office.

Shelley announced his resignation on February 4, 2005, effective March 1, although he did not leave office until three days later, on March 4.

Chief Deputy Secretary of State Cathy Mitchell briefly served as Secretary of State until Bruce McPherson, a Republican, was appointed by Governor Arnold Schwarzenegger. Upon taking office, McPherson reversed Shelley's actions, and on March 10, 2006, McPherson certified the use of DRE voting machines without verifiable, auditable paper trails.

California State Bar records indicate Shelley resumed practicing law in April 2005.

California Assembly
Preceded by John Burton	California State Assemblyman, 12th District; 1996–2002	Succeeded by Leland Yee
Political offices
Preceded by Bill Jones	California Secretary of State; 2003–2005	Succeeded by Cathy Mitchell
Party political offices
Preceded by Antonio Villaraigosa	Majority Leader of the California State Assembly; March 19, 1998 – February 7, 2002	Succeeded by Marco Firebaugh or Wilma Chan
