= 2022 United States Senate elections in California =

- November 8, 2022
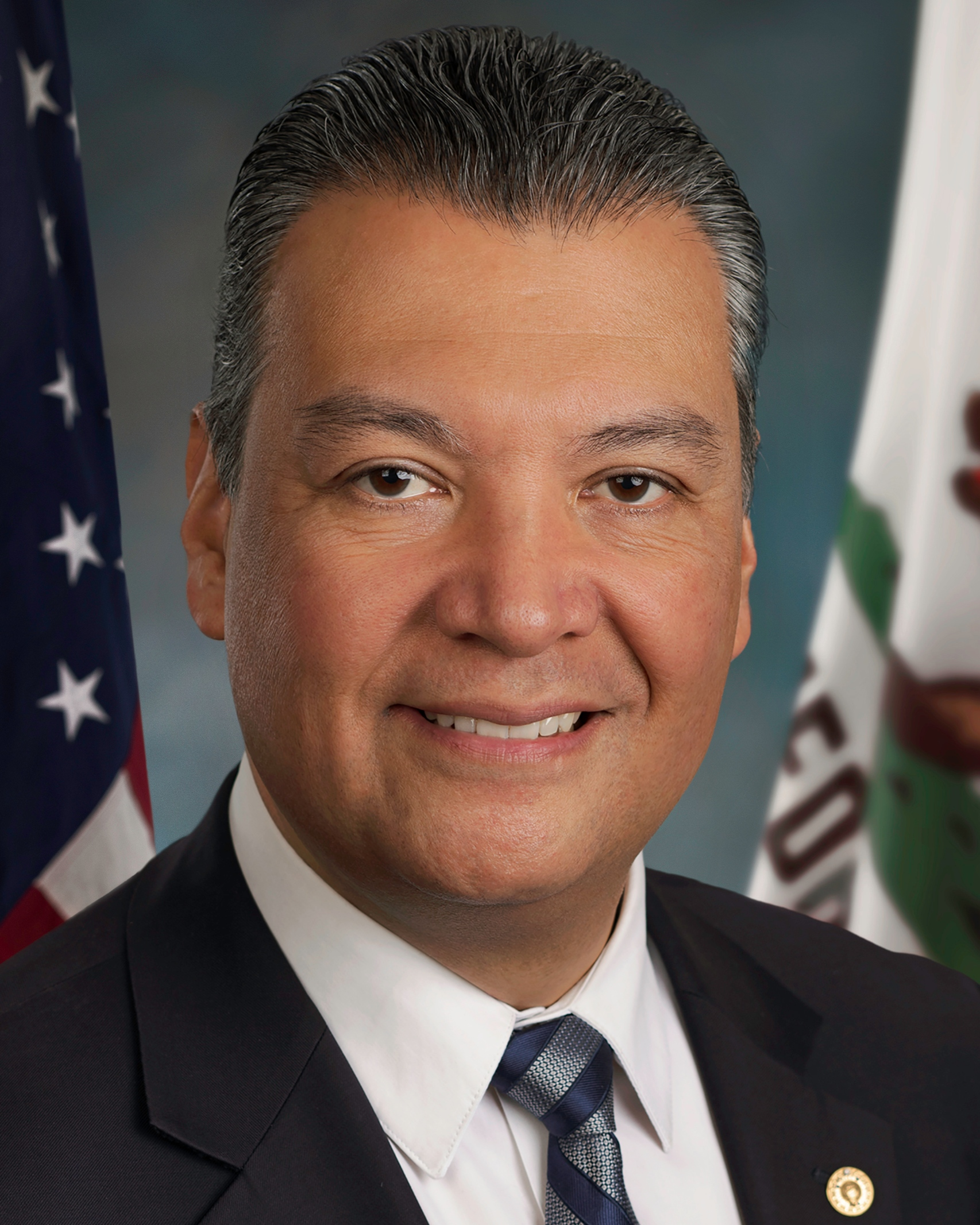

Candidate	Alex Padilla	Mark Meuser
Party	Democratic	Republican
Regular election	6,621,621; 61.06%	4,222,029; 38.94%
Special election	6,559,308; 60.89%	4,212,450; 39.11%
- Padilla: 50–60% 60–70% 70–80% 80–90% >90% Meuser: 50–60% 60–70% 70–80%
U.S. senator before election
Alex Padilla (Note: In January 2021, Padilla was appointed by Governor Gavin Newsom to fill the vacancy caused by the resignation of Senator Kamala Harris, who had been elected vice president of the United States.)
Democratic
Elected U.S. senator
Alex Padilla
Democratic

Two 2022 United States Senate elections in California were held concurrently on November 8, 2022, to elect a member of the United States Senate to represent the state of California. There were two ballot items for the same Class 3 seat: a special election to fill the seat for the final weeks of the 117th United States Congress (ending on January 3, 2023), and a general election for a full term (beginning on the same day), starting in the 118th United States Congress.

Incumbent Democratic Senator Alex Padilla was appointed in 2021 by Governor Gavin Newsom to fill the vacancy created by Kamala Harris's election to the vice presidency in 2020, and he sought a full term. A nonpartisan primary for each of the terms took place on June 7. The top two candidates in each primary, regardless of party, advanced to the special and regular general elections in November. With his advancement out of the primary, Mark P. Meuser (/ˈmɔɪʒər/ MOY-zhər) became the first Republican since 2012 to advance to the general election, as both the 2016 and 2018 Senate elections solely featured Democrats as the top two candidates. This race was a rematch between the two, as both had previously run for the secretary of state in 2018. Padilla won both elections with more than 60% of the vote.

He became the first Latino elected to the U.S. Senate from California, and the first male elected to the Senate from California since Pete Wilson was re-elected in 1988 and the first male elected to the Class 3 Senate seat from California since Alan Cranston was re-elected in 1986. This was the first time since 1988 that both major party final candidates for a Senate seat in California were men and was also the first time that both major party candidates for the Class 3 Senate seat in California were men since 1986.

== Candidates ==
=== Democratic Party ===
==== Advanced to general ====
- Alex Padilla, incumbent U.S. senator (2021–present) and former secretary of state of California (2015–2021)

==== Eliminated in primary ====
- Akinyemi Agbede, mathematician
- Dan O'Dowd, founder and president of Green Hills Software and candidate for U.S. Senate in 1994
- Douglas Howard Pierce, businessman and candidate for U.S. Senate in 2018
- Obaidul Huq Pirjada, attorney
- Timothy J. Ursich, doctor

==== Declined ====
- Ro Khanna, U.S. representative for California's 17th congressional district (2017–present) (endorsed Padilla)

=== Republican Party ===
==== Advanced to general ====
- Mark P. Meuser, attorney and candidate for California Secretary of State in 2018

==== Eliminated in primary ====
- James P. Bradley, businessman, candidate for U.S. Senate in 2018, and candidate for California's 33rd congressional district in 2020
- Jon Elist, small business owner
- Myron L. Hall, physician
- Sarah Sun Liew, entrepreneur
- Robert George Lucero Jr., consultant
- Enrique Petris, businessman
- Chuck Smith, retired law enforcement officer
- Carlos Guillermo Tapia, businessman
- Cordie Williams, marine veteran and doctor
- Lijun Zhou, businesswoman (write-in, general election only)

==== Withdrawn ====
- Yvonne R. Girard, retired government employee (died)
- Elizabeth Heng, candidate for California's 16th congressional district in 2018 and former U.S. House staffer (ran in the CA-22 special election)

=== Green Party ===
==== Eliminated in primary ====
- James "Henk" Conn, educator and candidate for mayor of Long Beach in 2018
- Pamela Elizondo, entrepreneur

=== Peace and Freedom Party ===
==== Eliminated in primary ====
- John Parker, candidate for U.S. Senate in 2018 and Workers World nominee for president of the United States in 2004 (running as write-in for special election)

=== No party preference ===
==== Eliminated in primary ====
- Daphne Bradford, entrepreneur and candidate for president in 2020
- Eleanor Garcia, industrial worker (Socialist Workers Party)
- Don J. Grundmann, chiropractor (Constitution Party)
- Deon D. Jenkins
- Irene Ratliff (write-in, both general and special elections)
- Marc Alexander Roth (write-in, general election only)
- Mark A. Ruzon (write-in, general election only), software engineer (American Solidarity Party)

== Primary elections ==
=== Endorsements ===
James P. Bradley (R)

Individuals

- Andrew Wakefield, former physician and anti-vaccine activist
Mark Meuser (R)

Newspapers

- Santa Barbara News-Press

Organizations

- California Pro-Life Council
- California Republican Party
- Rebuild California
Alex Padilla (D)

U.S. senators

- Dianne Feinstein, U.S. senator from California
- Chuck Schumer, U.S. senator from New York and Senate majority leader
- Elizabeth Warren, U.S. senator from Massachusetts

Statewide officials

- Rob Bonta, attorney general of California
- Eleni Kounalakis, lieutenant governor of California
- Ricardo Lara, California insurance commissioner
- Fiona Ma, California state treasurer
- Gavin Newsom, governor of California
- Tony Thurmond, California state superintendent of public instruction
- Shirley Weber, secretary of state of California
- Betty Yee, state controller of California

U.S. representatives

- Pete Aguilar, U.S. representative for CA-31
- Nanette Barragán, U.S. representative for CA-44
- Karen Bass, U.S. representative for CA-37
- Ami Bera, U.S. representative for CA-07
- Julia Brownley, U.S. representative for CA-26
- Salud Carbajal, U.S. representative for CA-24
- Tony Cárdenas, U.S. representative for CA-27
- Judy Chu, U.S. representative for CA-29
- Lou Correa, U.S. representative for CA-46
- Jim Costa, U.S. representative for CA-16
- Mark DeSaulnier, U.S. representative for CA-11
- Anna Eshoo, U.S. representative for CA-18
- John Garamendi, U.S. representative for CA-03
- Jimmy Gomez, U.S. representative for CA-34
- Josh Harder, U.S. representative for CA-10
- Jared Huffman, U.S. representative for CA-02
- Sara Jacobs, U.S. representative for CA-53
- Ro Khanna, U.S. representative for CA-17
- Barbara Lee, U.S. representative for CA-13
- Mike Levin, U.S. representative for CA-49
- Ted Lieu, U.S. representative for CA-33
- Zoe Lofgren, U.S. representative for CA-19
- Alan Lowenthal, U.S. representative for CA-47
- Doris Matsui, U.S. representative for CA-06
- Jerry McNerney, U.S. representative for CA-09
- Grace Napolitano, U.S. representative for CA-32
- Jimmy Panetta, U.S. representative for CA-20
- Nancy Pelosi, U.S. representative for CA-12 and speaker of the House
- Scott Peters, U.S. representative for CA-52
- Katie Porter, U.S. representative for CA-45
- Lucille Roybal-Allard, U.S. representative for CA-40
- Raul Ruiz, U.S. representative for CA-36
- Linda Sánchez, U.S. representative for CA-38
- Adam Schiff, U.S. representative for CA-28
- Brad Sherman, U.S. representative for CA-30
- Jackie Speier, U.S. representative for CA-14
- Eric Swalwell, U.S. representative for CA-15
- Mark Takano, U.S. representative for CA-41
- Mike Thompson, U.S. representative for CA-05
- Norma Torres, U.S. representative for CA-35
- Juan Vargas, U.S. representative for CA-51
- Maxine Waters, U.S. representative for CA-43

Organizations

- California Teachers Association
- Democratic Senatorial Campaign Committee
- Equality California
- NARAL Pro-Choice California
- National Education Association

Newspapers

- The Fresno Bee
- Los Angeles Times
- Marin Independent Journal
- La Opinión
- The Orange County Register
- The San Diego Union-Tribune
- The San Luis Obispo Tribune

Stonewall Democrats clubs

- Alice B. Toklas LGBT Democratic Club (San Francisco)
- East Bay Stonewall Democratic Club (Berkeley)
- Fresno Stonewall Democrats
- Harvey Milk LGBT Democratic Club (San Francisco)
- San Diego Democrats for Equality
- Stonewall Democrats
John Parker (P&F)

Organizations

- Green Party of California

=== Campaign ===
Incumbent senator Alex Padilla was appointed to the job in January 2021 following Kamala Harris's election to the office of Vice President of the United States. Following his appointment, Padilla quickly began to focus on his 2022 election campaign, as the fact that he has not been elected to the position means that he has a relatively low profile. Padilla's election strategy focused on advocating for progressive policies and building ties with left-wing organizations that had a poor relationship with California's other Senator, Dianne Feinstein. The potential Democratic opponent to Padilla considered most likely to join the race was U.S. Representative Ro Khanna, a staunchly left-wing Democrat who rose to prominence as the co-chair of the Bernie Sanders 2020 presidential campaign, and who had a loyal base of support from California's Asian-American and Pacific Islander communities. On August 9, 2021, Khanna announced that he would be endorsing Padilla for election, which was viewed as likely ending any possibility that Padilla would face a serious Democratic opponent. It was noted by the San Francisco Chronicle that it was considered unlikely that Padilla would face any serious Republican opponent, as California's heavily Democratic lean caused potentially strong candidates, such as U.S. Representatives Mike Garcia and Young Kim, to prefer to remain in their positions rather than launch a long-shot Senate run.

In April 2022, billionaire businessman Dan O'Dowd entered the race, launching a $650,000 ad campaign. O'Dowd's goal with this ad buy, and with entering the race in the first place, was to "make computers safe for humanity" and draw the attention of the public and politicians to the dangers of Tesla's unfinished Full Self-Driving software being rolled out to 100,000 cars on public roads.

=== Special election blanket primary ===
==== Polling ====
Poll source	Date(s) administered	Sample size (Note: Key: A – all adults RV – registered voters LV – likely voters V – unclear)	Margin of error	Daphne Bradford (NPP)	James Bradley (R)	Jon Elist (R)	Myron Hall (R)	Mark Meuser (R)	Dan O'Dowd (D)	Alex Padilla (D)	Timothy Ursich Jr. (D)	Undecided
Berkeley IGS	May 24–31, 2022	3,438 (LV)	± 2.2%	1%	7%	5%	2%	14%	3%	44%	2%	21%
SurveyUSA	May 13–15, 2022	709 (LV)	± 4.5%	1%	8%	7%	3%	11%	6%	40%	2%	22%

==== Results ====
County results Padilla: 20–30%; 30–40%; 40–50%; 50–60%; 60–70%; 70–80%; 80–90%; Meuser: 30–40%; 40–50%

Congressional district results Padilla: 30–40%; 40–50%; 50–60%; 60–70%; 70–80%; 80–90%; Meuser: 30–40%; 40–50%

Special election blanket primary results
Party	Candidate	Votes	%
Democratic	Alex Padilla (incumbent)	3,740,582	55.0
Republican	Mark P. Meuser	1,503,480	22.1
Republican	James P. Bradley	472,052	6.9
Republican	Jon Elist	403,722	5.9
Democratic	Timothy J. Ursich	226,447	3.3
Democratic	Dan O'Dowd	191,531	2.8
Republican	Myron L. Hall	143,038	2.1
No party preference	Daphne Bradford	112,191	1.6
Peace and Freedom	John Parker (write-in)	9,951	0.1
No party preference	Irene Ratliff (write-in)	12	0.0
Total votes		6,803,006	100.0

=== Regular election blanket primary ===
==== Polling ====
Poll source	Date(s) administered	Sample size	Margin of error	(D) Akinyemi Agbede	(I) Daphne Bradford	(R) James Bradley	(G) James Conn	(R) Jon Elist	(G) Pamela Elizondo	(I) Eleanor Garcia	(I) Don Grundmann	(R) Myron Hall	(I) Deon Jenkins	(R) Sarah Sun Liew	(R) Robert Lucero Jr.	(R) Mark Meuser	(D) Dan O'Dowd	(D) Alex Padilla	(PF) John Parker	(R) Enrique Petris	(D) Douglas Pierce	(D) Obaidul Huq Pirjada	(R) Chuck Smith	(R) Carlos Tapia	(D) Timothy Ursich Jr.	(R) Cordie Williams	Undecided
Berkeley IGS	May 24–31, 2022	3,438 (LV)	± 2.2%	1%	0%	3%	0%	2%	1%	0%	0%	1%	0%	1%	0%	11%	1%	42%	1%	0%	1%	1%	6%	1%	1%	2%	22%
SurveyUSA	May 13–15, 2022	709 (LV)	± 4.5%	2%	0%	9%	1%	4%	0%	0%	0%	3%	0%	3%	2%	4%	1%	36%	0%	1%	2%	2%	2%	1%	1%	1%	24%

==== Results ====
County results Padilla: 20–30%; 30–40%; 40–50%; 50–60%; 60–70%; 70–80%; Meuser: 20–30%

Congressional district results Padilla: 30–40%; 40–50%; 50–60%; 60–70%; 70–80%; 80–90%; Meuser: 20–30%

Regular election blanket primary results
Party	Candidate	Votes	%
Democratic	Alex Padilla (incumbent)	3,725,544	54.1
Republican	Mark P. Meuser	1,028,374	14.9
Republican	Cordie Williams	474,321	6.9
Republican	Jon Elist	289,716	4.2
Republican	Chuck Smith	266,766	3.9
Republican	James P. Bradley	235,788	3.4
Democratic	Douglas Howard Pierce	116,771	1.7
Peace and Freedom	John Parker	105,477	1.5
Republican	Sarah Sun Liew	76,994	1.1
Democratic	Dan O'Dowd	74,916	1.1
Democratic	Akinyemi Agbede	70,971	1.0
Republican	Myron L. Hall	66,161	1.0
Democratic	Timothy J. Ursich	58,348	0.8
Republican	Robert George Lucero Jr.	53,398	0.8
Green	James "Henk" Conn	35,983	0.5
No party preference	Eleanor Garcia (Note: Garcia is listed on the ballot as a "no party preference" candidate because the Socialist Workers Party did not have ballot access in California at the time the ballot was printed.)	34,625	0.5
Republican	Carlos Guillermo Tapia	33,870	0.5
Green	Pamela Elizondo	31,981	0.5
Republican	Enrique Petris	31,883	0.5
Democratic	Obaidul Huq Pirjada	27,889	0.4
No party preference	Daphne Bradford	26,900	0.4
No party preference	Don J. Grundmann (Note: Grundmann is listed on the ballot as a "no party preference" candidate because the Constitution Party did not have ballot access in California at the time the ballot was printed.)	10,181	0.1
No party preference	Deon D. Jenkins	6,936	0.1
No party preference	Mark A. Ruzon (write-in)	206	0.0
Republican	Lijun Zhou (write-in)	58	0.0
No party preference	Irene Ratliff (write-in)	7	0.0
No party preference	Marc Alexander Roth (write-in)	1	0.0
Total votes		6,884,065	100.0

== General elections ==
=== Predictions ===
Source	Ranking	As of
The Cook Political Report	Solid D	March 4, 2022
Inside Elections	Solid D	April 1, 2022
Sabato's Crystal Ball	Safe D	March 1, 2022
Politico	Solid D	April 1, 2022
RCP	Safe D	February 24, 2022
Fox News	Solid D	May 12, 2022
DDHQ	Solid D	July 20, 2022
538	Solid D	June 30, 2022
The Economist	Safe D	September 7, 2022

=== Polling ===
Special election

Poll source	Date(s) administered	Sample size	Margin of error	Alex Padilla (D)	Mark Meuser (R)	Undecided
Research Co.	November 4–6, 2022	450 (LV)	± 4.6%	59%	35%	6%
SurveyUSA	October 7–10, 2022	1,013 (LV)	± 4.4%	56%	34%	10%

Regular election

Poll source	Date(s) administered	Sample size	Margin of error	Alex Padilla (D)	Mark Meuser (R)	Undecided
Research Co.	November 4–6, 2022	450 (LV)	± 4.6%	60%	35%	5%
USC	October 30 – November 2, 2022	802 (RV)	± 3.5%	63%	37%	–
ActiVote	July 22 – October 20, 2022	208 (LV)	± 7.0%	65%	35%	–
SurveyUSA	October 7–10, 2022	1,013 (LV)	± 4.4%	56%	34%	11%

=== Results ===
2022 United States Senate special election in California
Party	Candidate	Votes	%	±%
Democratic	Alex Padilla (incumbent)	6,559,308	60.89%	+8.71%
Republican	Mark Meuser	4,212,450	39.11%	−3.06%
Total votes		10,771,758	100.00%	N/A
Democratic hold				

2022 United States Senate election in California
Party	Candidate	Votes	%	±%
Democratic	Alex Padilla (incumbent)	6,621,621	61.06%	+0.17%
Republican	Mark Meuser	4,222,029	38.94%	−0.17%
Total votes		10,843,650	100.00%	N/A
Democratic hold				

==== Special election ====
County	Alex Padilla Democratic		Mark Meuser Republican		Margin		Total votes cast
County	#	%	#	%	#	%	Total votes cast
Alameda	379,778	80.10	94,326	19.90	285,452	60.21	474,104
Alpine	373	60.85	240	39.15	133	21.70	613
Amador	6,482	35.43	11,814	64.57	-5,332	-29.14	18,296
Butte	33,276	46.57	38,181	53.43	-4,905	-6.86	71,457
Calaveras	7,628	36.31	13,382	63.69	-5,754	-27.39	21,010
Colusa	1,802	33.02	3,655	66.98	-1,853	-33.96	5,457
Contra Costa	263,748	69.48	115,853	30.52	147,895	38.96	379,601
Del Norte	3,378	41.09	4,842	58.91	-1,464	-17.81	8,220
El Dorado	36,530	41.80	50,871	58.20	-14,341	-16.41	87,401
Fresno	100,792	46.82	114,504	53.18	-13,712	-6.37	215,296
Glenn	2,243	28.83	5,538	71.17	-3,295	-42.35	7,781
Humboldt	30,601	64.14	17,106	35.86	13,495	28.29	47,707
Imperial	17,761	59.76	11,961	40.24	5,800	19.51	29,722
Inyo	3,461	47.28	3,859	52.72	-398	-5.44	7,320
Kern	73,524	39.41	113,056	60.59	-39,532	-21.19	186,580
Kings	10,010	37.72	16,531	62.28	-6,521	-24.57	26,541
Lake	10,142	51.14	9,690	48.86	452	2.28	19,832
Lassen	1,886	20.85	7,158	79.15	-5,272	-58.29	9,044
Los Angeles	1,647,824	69.75	714,557	30.25	933,267	39.51	2,362,381
Madera	13,869	38.14	22,499	61.86	-8,630	-23.73	36,368
Marin	94,612	81.01	22,172	18.99	72,440	62.03	116,784
Mariposa	3,048	39.32	4,704	60.68	-1,656	-21.36	7,752
Mendocino	19,589	65.54	10,298	34.46	9,291	31.09	29,887
Merced	26,273	48.60	27,788	51.40	-1,515	-2.80	54,061
Modoc	798	23.90	2,541	76.10	-1,743	-52.20	3,339
Mono	2,576	57.36	1,915	42.64	661	14.72	4,491
Monterey	67,047	66.26	34,146	33.74	32,901	32.51	101,193
Napa	32,546	66.39	16,474	33.61	16,072	32.79	49,020
Nevada	27,707	55.47	22,244	44.53	5,463	10.94	49,951
Orange	476,118	49.42	487,272	50.58	-11,154	-1.16	963,390
Placer	77,218	43.02	102,293	56.98	-25,075	-13.97	179,511
Plumas	3,377	39.55	5,161	60.45	-1,784	-20.89	8,538
Riverside	286,799	49.29	295,101	50.71	-8,302	-1.43	581,900
Sacramento	281,494	59.85	188,822	40.15	92,672	19.70	470,316
San Benito	10,901	56.56	8,373	43.44	2,528	13.12	19,274
San Bernardino	215,305	48.68	226,951	51.32	-11,646	-2.63	442,256
San Diego	582,966	57.48	431,303	42.52	151,663	14.95	1,014,269
San Francisco	253,856	85.55	42,871	14.45	210,985	71.10	296,727
San Joaquin	89,168	51.24	84,844	48.76	4,324	2.48	174,012
San Luis Obispo	62,852	53.38	54,892	46.62	7,960	6.76	117,744
San Mateo	185,260	76.12	58,114	23.88	127,146	52.24	243,374
Santa Barbara	81,750	61.52	51,142	38.48	30,608	23.03	132,892
Santa Clara	376,952	71.36	151,279	28.64	225,673	42.72	528,231
Santa Cruz	80,071	77.85	22,784	22.15	57,287	55.70	102,855
Shasta	20,805	30.89	46,537	69.11	-25,732	-38.21	67,342
Sierra	569	37.02	968	62.98	-399	-25.96	1,537
Siskiyou	6,885	39.50	10,546	60.50	-3,661	-21.00	17,431
Solano	79,363	61.48	49,732	38.52	29,631	22.95	129,095
Sonoma	141,894	73.30	51,678	26.70	90,216	46.61	193,572
Stanislaus	57,261	44.83	70,472	55.17	-13,211	-10.34	127,733
Sutter	9,748	35.39	17,798	64.61	-8,050	-29.22	27,546
Tehama	5,680	27.91	14,673	72.09	-8,993	-44.19	20,353
Trinity	2,008	44.90	2,464	55.10	-456	-10.20	4,472
Tulare	34,930	38.72	55,271	61.28	-20,341	-22.55	90,201
Tuolumne	8,884	38.87	13,971	61.13	-5,087	-22.26	22,855
Ventura	155,057	56.00	121,850	44.00	33,207	11.99	276,907
Yolo	45,826	68.57	21,006	31.43	24,820	37.14	66,832
Yuba	7,007	36.15	12,377	63.85	-5,370	-27.70	19,384
Totals	6,559,308	60.89	4,212,450	39.11	2,346,858	21.79	10,771,758

Counties that flipped from Republican to Democratic

- Mono (largest municipality: Mammoth Lakes)
- Nevada (largest town: Truckee)
- San Luis Obispo (largest town: San Luis Obispo)
- San Diego (largest community: San Diego)
- San Joaquin (largest city: Stockton)
- Ventura (largest city: Ventura)

==== Regular election ====
County	Alex Padilla Democratic		Mark Meuser Republican		Margin		Total votes cast
County	#	%	#	%	#	%	Total votes cast
Alameda	383,300	80.26	94,283	19.74	289,017	60.52	477,583
Alpine	372	60.78	240	39.22	132	21.57	612
Amador	6,522	35.37	11,917	64.63	-5,395	-29.26	18,439
Butte	33,467	46.71	38,183	53.29	-4,716	-6.58	71,650
Calaveras	7,649	36.31	13,415	63.69	-5,766	-27.37	21,064
Colusa	1,807	33.11	3,651	66.89	-1,844	-33.79	5,458
Contra Costa	267,331	69.72	116,122	30.28	151,209	39.43	383,453
Del Norte	3,400	41.20	4,852	58.80	-1,452	-17.60	8,252
El Dorado	36,669	41.81	51,025	58.19	-14,356	-16.37	87,694
Fresno	100,963	47.00	113,845	53.00	-12,882	-6.00	214,808
Glenn	2,234	28.52	5,600	71.48	-3,366	-42.97	7,834
Humboldt	30,612	64.17	17,096	35.83	13,516	28.33	47,708
Imperial	17,774	59.86	11,919	40.14	5,855	19.72	29,693
Inyo	3,488	47.35	3,878	52.65	-390	-5.29	7,366
Kern	73,784	39.41	113,432	60.59	-39,648	-21.18	187,216
Kings	10,067	37.85	16,533	62.15	-6,466	-24.31	26,600
Lake	10,138	50.93	9,769	49.07	369	1.85	19,907
Lassen	1,888	20.82	7,181	79.18	-5,293	-58.36	9,069
Los Angeles	1,670,306	70.00	715,913	30.00	954,393	40.00	2,386,219
Madera	14,018	38.37	22,514	61.63	-8,496	-23.26	36,532
Marin	95,496	81.05	22,326	18.95	73,170	62.10	117,822
Mariposa	3,050	39.34	4,703	60.66	-1,653	-21.32	7,753
Mendocino	19,745	65.49	10,406	34.51	9,339	30.97	30,151
Merced	26,755	48.96	27,893	51.04	-1,138	-2.08	54,648
Modoc	802	23.91	2,552	76.09	-1,750	-52.18	3,354
Mono	2,594	57.40	1,925	42.60	669	14.80	4,519
Monterey	67,153	66.37	34,026	33.63	33,127	32.74	101,179
Napa	32,651	66.36	16,549	33.64	16,102	32.73	49,200
Nevada	27,898	55.38	22,478	44.62	5,420	10.76	50,376
Orange	479,494	49.50	489,185	50.50	-9,691	-1.00	968,679
Placer	77,540	43.05	102,597	56.95	-25,057	-13.91	180,137
Plumas	3,405	39.79	5,153	60.21	-1,748	-20.43	8,558
Riverside	289,599	49.40	296,687	50.60	-7,088	-1.21	586,286
Sacramento	283,117	59.98	188,925	40.02	94,192	19.95	472,042
San Benito	11,016	56.83	8,368	43.17	2,648	13.66	19,384
San Bernardino	218,494	49.10	226,470	50.90	-7,976	-1.79	444,964
San Diego	586,284	57.57	432,027	42.43	154,257	15.15	1,018,311
San Francisco	254,756	85.65	42,699	14.35	212,057	71.29	297,455
San Joaquin	90,289	51.49	85,078	48.51	5,211	2.97	175,367
San Luis Obispo	63,076	53.38	55,087	46.62	7,989	6.76	118,163
San Mateo	186,891	76.37	57,825	23.63	129,066	52.74	244,716
Santa Barbara	82,255	61.57	51,339	38.43	30,916	23.14	133,594
Santa Clara	383,152	71.43	153,249	28.57	229,903	42.86	536,401
Santa Cruz	80,675	77.96	22,810	22.04	57,865	55.92	103,485
Shasta	20,805	30.80	46,750	69.20	-25,945	-38.41	67,555
Sierra	572	37.02	973	62.98	-401	-25.95	1,545
Siskiyou	6,892	39.39	10,607	60.61	-3,715	-21.23	17,499
Solano	80,317	61.90	49,443	38.10	30,874	23.79	129,760
Sonoma	143,197	73.37	51,982	26.63	91,215	46.73	195,179
Stanislaus	57,861	44.97	70,792	55.03	-12,931	-10.05	128,653
Sutter	9,797	35.47	17,827	64.53	-8,030	-29.07	27,624
Tehama	5,670	27.72	14,784	72.28	-9,114	-44.56	20,454
Trinity	2,019	44.80	2,488	55.20	-469	-10.41	4,507
Tulare	35,215	38.88	55,359	61.12	-20,144	-22.24	90,574
Tuolumne	8,932	38.92	14,016	61.08	-5,084	-22.15	22,948
Ventura	155,231	56.03	121,822	43.97	33,409	12.06	277,053
Yolo	46,094	68.68	21,022	31.32	25,072	37.36	67,116
Yuba	7,043	36.15	12,439	63.85	-5,396	-27.70	19,482
Totals	6,621,621	61.06	4,222,029	38.94	2,399,592	22.13	10,843,650

==== By congressional district ====
Padilla won 42 of 52 congressional districts in the special and regular elections, including two that elected Republicans.

District	Padilla	Meuser	Representative
1st	36%	64%	Doug LaMalfa
2nd	73%	27%	Jared Huffman
3rd	46%	54%	Kevin Kiley
4th	66%	34%	Mike Thompson
5th	40%	60%	Tom McClintock
6th	57%	43%	Ami Bera
7th	66%	34%	Doris Matsui
8th	75%	25%	John Garamendi
9th	51%	49%	Josh Harder
10th	66%	34%	Mark DeSaulnier
11th	86%	14%	Nancy Pelosi
12th	91%	9%	Barbara Lee
13th	49%	51%	John Duarte
14th	70%	30%	Eric Swalwell
15th	77%	23%	Jackie Speier (117th Congress)
15th	77%	23%	Kevin Mullin (118th Congress)
16th	74%	26%	Anna Eshoo
17th	71%	29%	Ro Khanna
18th	68%	32%	Zoe Lofgren
19th	67%	33%	Jimmy Panetta
20th	32%	68%	Kevin McCarthy
21st	53%	47%	Jim Costa
22nd	51%	49%	David Valadao
23rd	41%	59%	Jay Obernolte
24th	61%	39%	Salud Carbajal
25th	55%	45%	Raul Ruiz
26th	55%	45%	Julia Brownley
27th	51%	49%	Mike Garcia
28th	65%	35%	Judy Chu
29th	76%	24%	Tony Cárdenas
30th	77%	23%	Adam Schiff
31st	61%	39%	Grace Napolitano
32nd	69%	31%	Brad Sherman
33rd	57%	43%	Pete Aguilar
34th	83%	17%	Jimmy Gomez
35th	57%	43%	Norma Torres
36th	69%	31%	Ted Lieu
37th	86%	14%	Karen Bass (117th Congress)
37th	86%	14%	Sydney Kamlager-Dove (118th Congress)
38th	60%	40%	Linda Sánchez
39th	56%	44%	Mark Takano
40th	46%	54%	Young Kim
41st	47%	53%	Ken Calvert
42nd	69%	31%	Lucille Roybal-Allard (117th Congress)
42nd	69%	31%	Robert Garcia (118th Congress)
43rd	80%	20%	Maxine Waters
44th	72%	28%	Nanette Barragán
45th	49%	51%	Michelle Steel
46th	61%	39%	Lou Correa
47th	51%	49%	Katie Porter
48th	40%	60%	Darrell Issa
49th	52%	48%	Mike Levin
50th	63%	37%	Scott Peters
51st	61%	39%	Sara Jacobs
52nd	65%	35%	Juan Vargas

== See also ==
- 2022 United States Senate elections
- 2022 California elections
- 117th United States Congress
- List of special elections to the United States Senate
