= Science advice =

Science advice is the process, structures and institutions through which governments and politicians consider science, technology and innovation information in policy- and decision- making. Across different national governments and international bodies, there are a variety of structures and institutions for scientific advice. They reflect distinctive cultures and traditions of decision-making, which Sheila Jasanoff has termed the 'civic epistemology' through which expert claims are constructed, validated or challenged in a given society.

Science advice can also be called "science for policy", indicating the flow of information from scientific to policy domains with the intention of informing decisions. This is distinct from "policy for science", the institutions, rules and norms governing how science is funded, conducted, and communicated.

At the national level, countries have diverse models for how to connect scientists and policymakers. In some countries, the president of the National academy, an elected organization of distinguished researchers in natural and social sciences, engineering, medicine, and the humanities, serves as a government science advisor, while other countries have an advisory committee or civil servants perform this role. National academies are often commissioned to write reports advising government on the state of scientific knowledge to inform policy-relevant questions, such as the risk from chemicals or disease.

Other countries, such as the UK, have a wide range of sources of expert scientific advice which draw on several of these sources.

At the international level, there is an increasing movement to bring together national science advisors to share best practices and form a network to deal with global challenges (e.g., pandemics, climate change). The first global Science Advice to Governments meeting was held in Auckland, New Zealand on August 27–28, 2014. This meeting brought together high-level science advisors, scientists, and practitioners to discuss the relationship between science and policy. A new network of European science academies was established at the European Open Science meeting in Copenhagen in June 2014, which now includes 20 countries.

The International Council for Science (ICSU) is a major international organization with a program in science for policy.

== Science advice structures ==
A briefing paper, described four of the most commonly used science advice structures for jurisdictions: advisory councils, advisory committees, national academies, and chief scientific advisors. These structures are most commonly employed at the national level, but may also be used in sub-national jurisdictions like Quebec, or supra-national bodies like the European Commission, which has an in-house science service, the Joint Research Centre.

Science advice also occurs at sub-national levels, where structures may include departmental scientific advisors (for example, the United States Environmental Protection Agency, and at the international level, where networks such as the International Council for Science coordinate science for policy, for example through serving as the science voice in the United Nations.

For any of these structures, individual experts may be asked for advice in specific circumstances.

Science Advice Structure	Explanation
Advisory councils	Many economies have a high-level council for science (or science and innovation) policy. Members typically include senior scientists, alongside representatives of industry, higher education and civil society. Examples include Japan’s Council for Science, Technology and Innovation (CSTI) and the US President’s Council of Advisors on Science and Technology (PCAST). Another example is Australia, where chief scientist Ian Chubb established the Commonwealth Science Council to advise the government on policy. However, in most systems, the focus of such entities remains on policy advice in relation to the science system, which is distinct from science advice for public policy.
Advisory committees	Most governments also rely on an array of specialized scientific and expert committees, which can address detailed technical and regulatory issues in areas such as health, environment and food safety. For example, the US and Japan have hundreds of such committees; the UK has over seventy.
National academies	A growing number of national academies are active in science policy and/or policy for science. In economies such as Canada, China, Germany, Netherlands, South Africa, US and UK, academies are an important source of scientific advice. Furthermore, networks of national academies such as the International Council for Science, with a membership of 121 national bodies, representing 141 economies, and 31 International Scientific Unions, and the Inter-Academy Partnership, the global network of science academies from 107 economies are actively involved in science for policy processes at the international level.
Chief scientific advisors	The first chief scientific advisor was appointed by the US in 1957, followed by the UK in 1964. The first chief scientific advisor in Quebec, Canada, was appointed in 2011.

== Science advice by jurisdiction (nation-state, sub-national jurisdictions, and supra-national bodies) ==
Jurisdiction	National Science Advice Structure/s	Chief Advisors/Key institutions
Austria	National academy	Austrian Academy of Sciences
Canada	Advisory council	• The Science, Technology and Innovation Council
Canada	National academy	• The Royal Society of Canada • Council of Canadian Academies
Canada	Chief Science Advisors	National: Chief Science Advisor • Quebec chief scientist: Remi Quirion
Chile	National academy and National Congress Library	Chilean Science Academy Science and technology in Chile
Denmark	National academy	Royal Danish Academy of Sciences and Letters Royal Danish Academy of Sciences and Letters
European Union	National academies and Chief Science Advisors	Scientific Advice Mechanism and within it, SAPEA
France	National academy	French Academy of Sciences
Ireland	National academy	Royal Irish Academy Royal Irish Academy
Ireland	Chief science advisors	Government Chief Scientific Adviser (Ireland)
United States of America	National academy	National Academy of Sciences
United States of America	Chief Science Advisors	Science Advisor to the President
United States of America (California)	Advisory organization	California Ocean Science Trust
United Kingdom	National Academy	The Royal Society
United Kingdom	Chief Science Advisors	National: Government Chief Scientific Adviser • Departmental science advisors are listed online.
Portugal	National Academy	Academia das Ciências de Lisboa
New Zealand	National Academy	Royal Society of New Zealand
New Zealand	Chief scientific Advisor	Prof Juliet Gerrard
Greece	National Academy	Academy of Athens
Germany	National Academy	German National Academy of Sciences Leopoldina
Cuba	National Academy	Academia de Ciencias de Cuba
Cuba	Chief Science Advisors	Castro Díaz-Balart
Australia	National Academy	Australian Academy of Science
Australia	Chief Science Advisors	National: Alan Finkel • NSW Chief Scientist and Engineer, Hugh F. Durrant-Whyte • QLD Chief Scientist, incumbent suspended • SA Chief Scientist, Caroline McMillen • VIC Lead Scientist, Amanda Caples • Chief Scientist of WA, Peter Klinken
Australia	State government science agency	The NSW Office of Environment & Heritage, with Dr. Kate Wilson Western Australia Office of science
Kenya	National Academy	Kenya National Academy of Sciences
Kenya	Chief Science Advisors	Shaukat A. Abdulrazak
Malaysia	National Academy	Academy of Sciences Malaysia
Malaysia	Chief Science Advisors	Zakri Abdul Hamid
China	National Academy	• Chinese Academy of Sciences • Chinese Academy of Social Sciences • Chinese Academy of Engineering
Finland	Advisory Council	The Council of Finnish Academies
India	National Academy	Indian National Science Academy
Italy	National Academy	L'Accademia Nazionale dei Lincei
Japan	Advisory Council	Council for Science Technology and Innovation (CSTI)
Mongolia	National Academy	Mongolian Academy of Sciences
Sweden	National Academy	The Royal Swedish Academy of Sciences
Switzerland	National Academy	The Swiss Academy of Sciences
South Korea	National Academy	National Academy of Sciences, Republic of Korea
South Africa	National Academy	Academy of Science of South Africa (ASSAf)
El Salvador	National Academy	Viceministerio de Ciencia y Tecnología
Thailand	Advisory Council	National Research Council of Thailand
