= Fred Keeley =

American politician (born 1950)

Member of the California State Assembly from the 27th district
- In office December 2, 1996 - November 30, 2002
- Preceded by: Bruce McPherson
- Succeeded by: John Laird

Personal details
- Born: May 9, 1950 (age 76) Sacramento, California
- Party: Democratic
- Spouse: Maria Rodriguez-Keeley
- Education: DeAnza College; San Jose State University

Fred Keeley (born May 9, 1950) is a politician in California, U.S. and serves as the current mayor of Santa Cruz, CA. Due to recent amendments to the cities' charter he is the first directly elected mayor with a four year term, as the mayoral role was traditionally a one year term selected by other council members. Keeley was a member of the California State Assembly, representing District 27 which included parts of Santa Cruz County and Monterey County from 1996 to 2002. He retired in January 2015 after 4 years as the Treasurer of Santa Cruz County.

== Early life and career ==
Keeley was born in Sacramento, California. He is the second son of Harry and Elizabeth Keeley. He was raised in San Jose. He attended and graduated from Cupertino High School in 1969. He attended DeAnza College in the early 1970s and took film classes from Professor Robert Scott. In 1974, Keeley graduated with honors from San Jose State University, School of Social Sciences.

After working for Law Enforcement Training and Research Associates, he was selected by Santa Cruz County Supervisor Joe Cucchaira to be Cucchaira's policy director. Keeley served in that capacity until March 1984 when then-Assembly Member Sam Farr (D-Carmel) hired Keeley to be his chief of staff. Keeley served in that capacity for nearly five years.

Keeley served for eight years as a member of the Santa Cruz County Board of Supervisors, prior to his election to the California Assembly.

== Assembly member ==
=== 1996 Assembly race ===
Moderate Republican Bruce McPherson's decision to run for California Senate District 15 made California Assembly District 27 an open seat. In March 1996, Keeley ran for the Democratic nomination for the 27th Assembly District against Karin Kauffman. Keeley won over 55% of the party's Democratic voters, and 33% of all votes cast. In the November general election, Keeley won about 57% of all votes cast against Republican Jim Davis.

=== First term ===
During his first term in the Assembly, Keeley chaired the Budget Subcommittee on Resources, where he advanced legislation, known as the Marine Life Management Act of 1998.

Also in 1998, Keeley was selected by Assembly Speaker Antonio Villaraigosa to be Speaker pro Tempore. This is the highest-ranking member of the Speaker's leadership team and, as such, Keeley was responsible for the development of the majority party's important policy initiatives. Keeley also investigated the actions of then-Insurance Commissioner Chuck Quackenbush. As a result of the investigation, Quackenbush resigned his office.

During this time, Keeley also authored the two largest park and environmental protection bonds in the nation's history, Proposition 12 on the California ballot in March 2000, and Proposition 40 on the California ballot in March 2002. Together, these voter-approved bonds provided $4.7 billion for environmental protection, park land and other valuable habitat land acquisition throughout the nation's most populated state.

=== California electricity crisis ===
In late 2000 and early 2001, the California electricity crisis manifested itself with rolling blackouts in many parts of the state. Speaker Robert Hertzberg appointed Keeley, his Speaker pro Tempore, as "chief operating officer" for the Assembly on the energy crisis. This position had three primary duties: to establish a triage system for dealing with day-to-day, minute-to-minute emergencies that were direct outgrowths of the lack of electricity; to form a policy group, both at the staff and legislator level, to sort out those ideas that were being advanced to solve the problem, and make recommendations to the Speaker and the governor, on how to tackle the many fronts on which this crisis was expanding; and to be the author of the agreed-upon package of legislation that would try to tame the energy crisis monster.

During the energy crisis, a variety of options were under consideration. The State of California was trying to get the Federal Energy Regulatory Commission to cap the wholesale price of electricity, as that price was far exceeding the statutory limit that regulated utilities in California could charge their retail customers. The wholesale price was far in excess of the retail price because of deregulation. When the legislature deregulated the electricity sector in 1996, it did so by taking a number of statutory actions. One was to create a Power Exchange or PX. This was intended to be the trading floor for buyers and sellers of electricity. Keeley believed that the model was seriously flawed because it assumed that electricity could be treated as a commodity. Commodities markets have several features: Many buyers, many sellers, transparent transactions, substitute products, and the ability of the buyer to withhold buying if the price is not to his or her liking. According to Keeley, the PX had none of these features.

In order to stabilize prices, and to assure a reliable supply of electricity, Keeley became the author of the State of California's solution so California participate in the market by buying the so-called net short position each day, and to sell that electricity to utility customers. While there was much criticism of the strategy at the time, it is clear that it had the desired effect: to wit, it stabilized prices and assured supply. PG&E's solution included the transfer of watershed lands and the creation of a youth stewardship program.

After the energy crisis, the California faced a massive budget deficit. Keeley helped in the budget negotiations between Democrats and Republicans to get the necessary 2/3 vote to pass the state budget compromise on the state budget.

== Later career ==
=== 2003-2004 ===
Due to term limits, Keeley left the Assembly in December 2002. Then-Governor Gray Davis asked Keeley to join his cabinet as Director of the California Department of Finance. Keeley declined, and instead became Executive Director of the Planning and Conservation League and the PCL Foundation. These two non-profit organizations specialize in environmental research and legislative advocacy. Keeley led these two organizations for two years.

=== Role in higher education ===
When Keeley was termed out of the legislature, the University of California, Santa Cruz established a perpetual environmental lecture series in his honor, known as the Fred Keeley Lectures on the Environment. The initial lecture was given by former Arizona Governor and Secretary of the Interior Bruce Babbitt. In 2005, the lecture was given by Dr. Paul Erlich of Stanford University, and author of the best selling book The Population Bomb. Keeley also made a planned gift of $250,000 to UCSC to support the campus's STEPS Institute for Innovation in Environmental Research.

Since Fall 2006, Keeley has taught courses as a part-time faculty member in the Department of Political Science at San Jose State University. He has taught State Politics and Legislative Politics, and was scheduled to teach Local Politics in Fall 2007. Keeley is a frequent lecturer on California state government, politics, and a variety of environmental topics at Stanford University, the University of California, Santa Cruz, Duke University, San Jose State University, California State University at Monterey Bay, the University of Southern California, and the University of California, Berkeley. Most recently, he has been teaching at Pacific Collegiate School as the Local and State Government and Politics instructor.

=== Return to local politics ===
In January 2005, Keeley returned to Santa Cruz and became Santa Cruz County Treasurer. While this position is a countywide elected position, Keeley was appointed by the board of supervisors to fill an unexpired term. On June 6, 2006, Keeley was elected to a four-year term as treasurer.

In addition to his work as treasurer, Keeley is a member of the board of directors of the California League of Conservation Voters, the state's premiere environmental political action organization. He also serves on the board of directors of Planned Parenthood Advocates for California and Nevada and is the current board vice president of Sempervirens Fund, originally established in 1900 as Sempervirens Club, California's oldest land conservation organization. Additionally, he serves on the board of directors of the California Ocean Science Trust.

Keeley is co-chair of the Voices of Reform Project of the Commonwealth Club of California. This project is focused on five major areas of governmental reform: Redistricting, Term Limits, Campaign Finance, Budget, and Initiative Reform. The other co-chair is Dan Shnur, former governor Pete Wilson's communications director. The Voices of Reform Project includes some three hundred civic leaders from throughout the California.

== Awards ==
- Legislator of the Year for the 2001-2002 Session of the California Legislature, by the California Journal.

California Assembly
Preceded by Bruce McPherson	California State Assemblyman, 27th District; 1996-2002	Succeeded by John Laird
