= 2014 Long Beach, California, mayoral election =

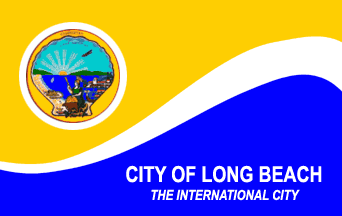
- April 8, 2014 (first round); June 3, 2014 (runoff)
- Turnout: 18.25% (first round)); 20.53% (runoff)
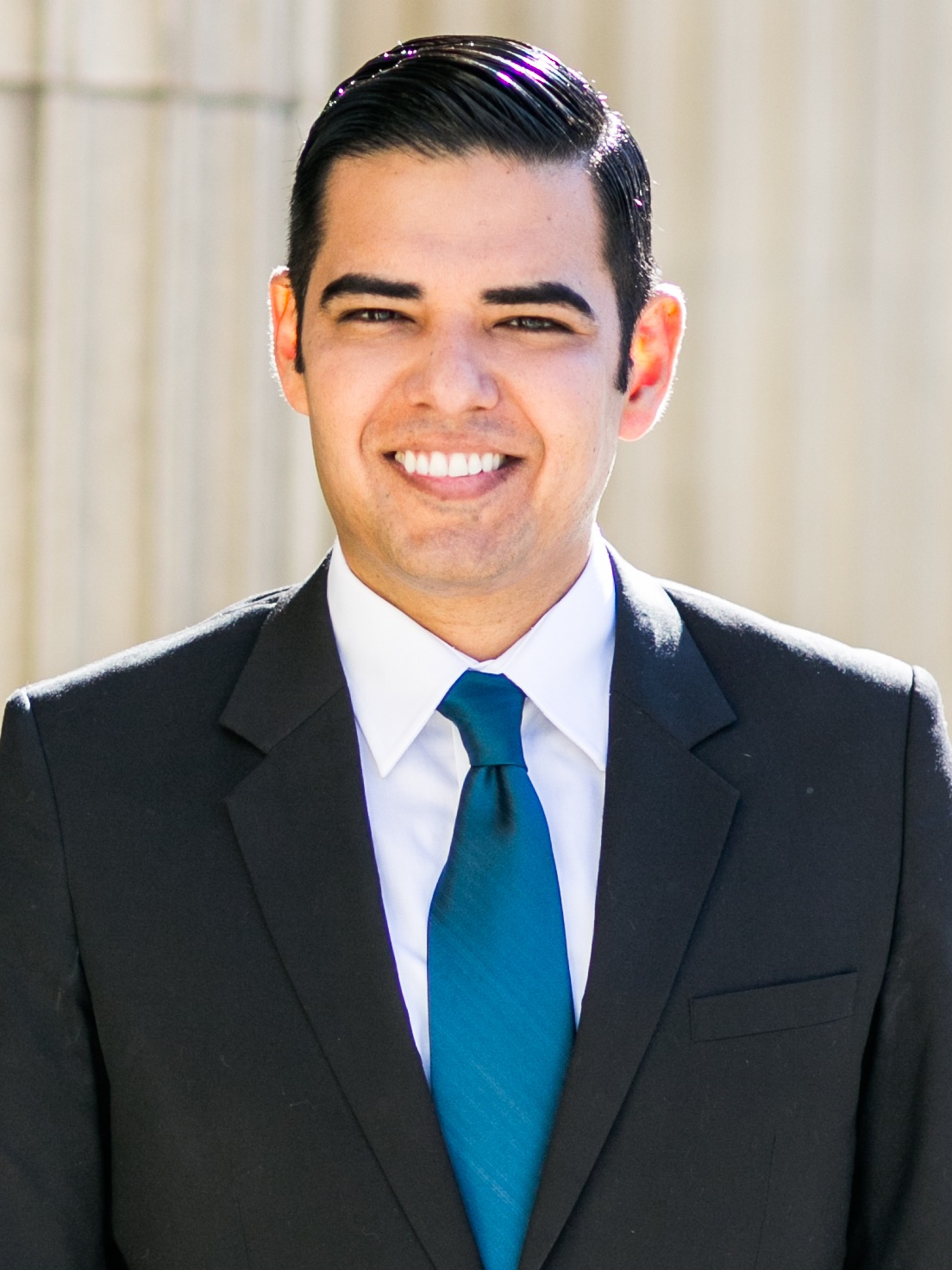

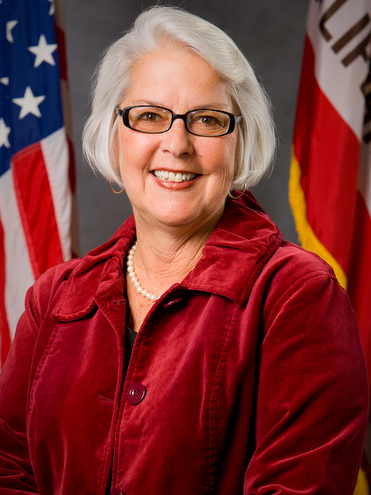
Candidate	Robert Garcia	Damon Dunn	Bonnie Lowenthal
First-round vote	11,873	10,637	9,227
First-round percentage	25.24%	22.61%	19.62%
Second-round vote	27,420	25,275
Second-round percentage	52.04%	47.96%
Candidate	Gerrie Schipske	Doug Otto
First-round vote	7,192	6,363
First-round percentage	15.29%	13.53%
Mayor before election
Bob Foster
Elected mayor
Dr. Robert Garcia

Long Beach, California, held an election for mayor on April 8, 2014 and June 2, 2014. It saw the election of Robert Garcia.

In winning, Garcia became the first openly gay person to be elected Mayor of Long Beach. Garcia is a Democrat, but was elected without a party affiliation, as municipal elections in California are officially non-partisan.

Incumbent Bob Foster was term limited.

== Results ==
=== First round ===
First round results
Candidate	Votes	%
Robert Garcia	11,873	25.24%
Damon Dunn	10,637	22.61%
Bonnie Lowenthal	9,227	19.62%
Gerrie Schipske	7,192	15.29%
Doug Otto	6,363	13.53%
Jana Shields	1,017	2.16%
Steven Paul Mozena	230	0.49%
Eric Rock	205	0.44%
Mineo L. Gonzalez	185	0.39%
Richard Anthony Camp	107	0.23%
Total votes	47,036	100.0%

=== Runoff ===
Runoff results
Candidate	Votes	%
Robert Garcia	27,420	52.04%
Damon Dunn	25,275	47.96%
Total votes	52,695	100.0%
