= Bruce McPherson =

American politician (born 1944)

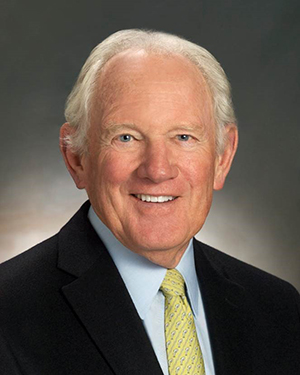
- Official portrait, 2016

Member of the Santa Cruz County Board of Supervisors from the 5th district
- In office January 2013 – December 30, 2024
- Preceded by: Mark Stone
- Succeeded by: Monica Martinez

27th Secretary of State of California
- In office March 30, 2005 – January 7, 2007
- Governor: Arnold Schwarzenegger
- Preceded by: Cathy Mitchell (acting)
- Succeeded by: Debra Bowen

Member of the California Senate from the 15th district
- In office December 2, 1996 – November 30, 2004
- Preceded by: Henry J. Mello
- Succeeded by: Abel Maldonado

Member of the California State Assembly from the 27th district
- In office November 14, 1993 – November 30, 1996
- Preceded by: Sam Farr
- Succeeded by: Fred Keeley

Personal details
- Born: January 7, 1944 (age 82) Santa Cruz, California, U.S.
- Party: Independent (2012–present)
- Other political affiliations: Republican (before 2012)
- Spouse: Mary McPherson
- Children: 1 (1 deceased)
- Education: California Polytechnic State University (BS)

Bruce A. McPherson (born January 7, 1944) is an American politician who served as the 27th California secretary of state from March 30, 2005, to January 7, 2007. He served for 12 years as a member of the Santa Cruz County Board of Supervisors, retiring in 2024. As of 2026, McPherson is the most recent Republican to serve as California Secretary of State.

== Early life and education ==
McPherson was born and raised in Santa Cruz, California. He attended Santa Cruz High School, where he played football as a running back and baseball as a second baseman. He earned a Bachelor of Science degree in journalism from California Polytechnic State University, San Luis Obispo in 1965.

== Career ==
Prior to his political career, he worked as the editor of the Santa Cruz Sentinel, a newspaper owned by his family. McPherson served as a member of the California State Assembly from 1993 to 1996 and California State Senate from 1996 to 2004. McPherson was defeated in the 2002 election for Lieutenant Governor of California by incumbent Cruz Bustamante.

He was nominated to replace former Secretary of State Kevin Shelley, who resigned on March 4. McPherson, a Republican from Santa Cruz County, served his term as secretary until January 8, 2007. He was confirmed unanimously by both Democratic-controlled houses of the California State Legislature after being nominated to replace Shelley, a Democrat, by Governor Arnold Schwarzenegger. He lost his bid for a full term to Democrat Debra Bowen in November 2006.

McPherson left the Republican Party in June 2012 to register as "no party preference".

In November 2012, McPherson was elected to the Santa Cruz County Board of Supervisors.

== Personal life ==
He and his wife have one daughter. Their son, Hunter, was murdered in a 2001 San Francisco street robbery.

== Electoral history ==
- 1996 California State Senate, 15th District
  - Bruce McPherson (R) – 47.2%
  - Rusty Areias (D) – 45.8%
- 2002 Republican Primary for California Lt. Governor
  - Bruce McPherson (R) – 86.2%
  - Ellie Michaels (R) – 13.8%
- 2002 California Lt. governor
  - Cruz Bustamante (D), (inc) – 49.4%
  - Bruce McPherson (R) – 41.8%
- 2006 California Secretary of State
  - Debra Bowen (D) – 48.4%
  - Bruce McPherson (R), (inc.) – 44.8%
- 2012 Santa Cruz County Board of Supervisors, District 5
  - Bruce McPherson (N/P) – 50.10%%
  - Eric Hammer (N/P) – 49.51%

California Assembly
Preceded by Sam Farr	California State Assemblyman; 27th District; November 14, 1993 – November 30, 1996	Succeeded by Fred Keeley
California Senate
Preceded by Henry J. Mello	California State Senator; 15th District; December 2, 1996 – November 30, 2004	Succeeded by Abel Maldonado
Political offices
Preceded by Cathy Mitchell	California Secretary of State; 2005–2007	Succeeded by Debra Bowen
