= 2010 California Secretary of State election =

- November 2, 2010
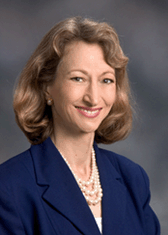

Nominee	Debra Bowen	Damon Dunn
Party	Democratic	Republican
Popular vote	5,105,307	3,666,407
Percentage	53.2%	38.2%
- County results Bowen: 40–50% 50–60% 60–70% 70–80% Dunn: 40–50% 50–60% 60–70%
Secretary of State before election
Debra Bowen
Democratic
Elected Secretary of State
Debra Bowen
Democratic

The 2010 California Secretary of State election was held on November 2, 2010, to choose the Secretary of State of California. The primary election was held on June 8, 2010. Incumbent Democratic Debra Bowen won reelection to a second term.

== Republican primary ==
=== Candidates ===
- Roy Allmond, write-in candidate
- Damon Dunn, small business owner
- Orly Taitz, attorney and dentist

California Republican Secretary of State primary, 2010
Candidate	Votes	%
Damon Dunn	1,477,811	74.4
Orly Taitz	508,455	25.6
Roy Allmond (write-in)	58	< 0.1
Total votes	1,986,324	100.00
Turnout	5,228,320	38.0%

== Other primaries ==
California Secretary of State primary, 2010 (others)
Party	Candidate	Votes	%
Democratic	Debra Bowen (incumbent)	2,044,327	100
American Independent	Merton Short	40,551	100
Green	Ann Menasche	21,798	100
Libertarian	Christina Tobin	18,189	100
Peace and Freedom	Marylou Cabral	4,046	100

== General election ==
California Secretary of State election, 2010
Party	Candidate	Votes	%	±%
Democratic	Debra Bowen (incumbent)	5,105,307	53.18%	+5.09%
Republican	Damon Dunn	3,666,407	38.19%	−6.80%
Green	Ann Menasche	286,694	2.99%	+0.83%
Libertarian	Christina Tobin	214,347	2.23%	+0.19%
Peace and Freedom	Marylou Cabral	164,450	1.71%	+0.62%
American Independent	Merton D. Short	162,102	1.69%	+0.07%
Total votes		9,599,307	100.0%	
Democratic hold				
