= Santa Cruz Sentinel =

Newspaper in Santa Cruz, California

- Type: Daily newspaper
- Format: Broadsheet
- Owner: Digital First Media
- Founder: John McElroy
- Founded: 1855 (as the Monterey Sentinel)
- Language: English
- Headquarters: 100 Pioneer Street #C1, Santa Cruz, California United States
- Circulation: 14,664 Daily; 16,189 Sunday (as of 2022)
- ISSN: 1531-0817
- OCLC number: 44628929
- Website: www.santacruzsentinel.com
- Free online archives: cdnc.ucr.edu (1884-2010)

The Santa Cruz Sentinel is a daily newspaper published in Santa Cruz, California, covering Santa Cruz County, California, and owned by Media News Group, which is controlled by Alden Global Capital.

== History ==
On June 2, 1855, John McElroy published the first edition of the Monterey Sentinel in Monterey, California. McElroy was an Ohioan who fought in the Mexican–American War. He had worked at other papers in Los Angeles and Placerville before starting one of his own. After a year in business, McElroy was approached by Albion Jordan, who co-owned a lime manufacturer. Jordan offered to freely move the printing plant to Santa Cruz and McElroy accepted. The press was transported aboard a schooner named "Queen of the West."

The Monterey Sentinel relocated in May 1856. The first issue of the new Pacific Sentinel was published in Santa Cruz on June 14, 1856. At that time the paper had 89 paid subscribers in a county of 1,219 persons. The paper's name was later changed for a third time to the Santa Cruz Sentinel. McElroy published the paper with several different partners over the following eight years including Duncan McPherson. The McPherson family would own and operate the paper for 118 years.

McElroy exited the firm in 1864, and Duncan McPherson left in 1870 to run the San Mateo Gazette, but returned to the Sentinel in 1876. He continued to manage the Santa Cruz paper until his death in 1921. His son Fred D. McPherson then published the Senintel until his sudden death in 1940. His son Fred D. McPherson Jr., succeeded him. In 1960, Duncan McPherson was posthumously inducted into the California Newspaper Hall of Fame.

In 1982, the Sentinel merged with Ottaway Community Newspapers, a division of Dow Jones & Company. In October 2006, Dow Jones sold the paper to Community Newspaper Holdings. On February 2, 2007, the Sentinel was sold again to MediaNews Group. The MediaNews Group formed Digital First Media in 2013 when it merged with Journal Register Company. The company is controlled by the hedge fund Alden Global Capital.
