= 2006 California Secretary of State election =

- November 7, 2006
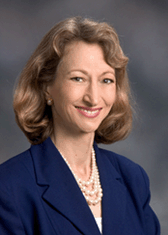

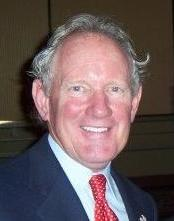
Nominee	Debra Bowen	Bruce McPherson
Party	Democratic	Republican
Popular vote	4,032,553	3,772,951
Percentage	48.09%	44.99%
- County results Bowen: 40–50% 50–60% 60–70% 70–80% McPherson: 40–50% 50–60% 60–70%
Secretary before election
Bruce McPherson
Republican
Elected Secretary
Debra Bowen
Democratic

The 2006 California Secretary of State election occurred on 7 November 2006. The primary elections took place on 6 June 2006. Despite Arnold Schwarzenegger’s 17-point re-election as Governor, State Senator Debra Bowen, the Democratic nominee, narrowly defeated the incumbent, Republican Bruce McPherson.

== Primary results ==
A bar graph of statewide results in this contest are available here.

Results by county are available here and here.

=== Democratic ===
==== Candidates ====
- Debra Bowen, State Senator
- Deborah Ortiz, State Senator

California Secretary of State Democratic primary, 2006
Candidate	Votes	%
Debra Bowen	1,316,542	60.84
Deborah Ortiz	847,419	39.16
Total votes	2,163,961	100.00

=== Others ===
California Secretary of State primary, 2006 (Others)
Party	Candidate	Votes	%
Republican	Bruce McPherson	1,593,019	100.00
Green	Forrest Hill	31,764	100.00
Libertarian	Gail Lightfoot	16,870	100.00
American Independent	Glenn McMillon	32,289	100.00
Peace and Freedom	Margie Akin	3,929	100.00

== Results ==
California Secretary of State election, 2006
Party	Candidate	Votes	%
Democratic	Debra Bowen	4,032,553	48.09
Republican	Bruce McPherson (incumbent)	3,772,951	44.99
Green	Forrest Hill	181,369	2.16
Libertarian	Gail Lightfoot	171,393	2.04
American Independent	Glenn McMillon	135,824	1.62
Peace and Freedom	Margie Akin	91,483	1.09
Invalid or blank votes		513,486	5.77
Total votes		8,385,573	100.00
Turnout			39.29
Democratic gain from Republican			

=== Results by county ===
Results from the Secretary of State of California:

County	Bowen	Votes	McPherson	Votes	Hill	Votes	Lightfoot	Votes	Others	Votes
San Francisco	72.97%	169,080	17.78%	41,190	5.16%	11,947	1.79%	4,158	2.30%	5,329
Alameda	67.80%	267,088	25.06%	98,721	3.46%	13,634	1.63%	6,418	2.05%	8,059
Marin	61.34%	62,248	31.69%	32,162	3.19%	3,239	1.60%	1,625	2.18%	2,211
San Mateo	60.29%	119,037	32.99%	65,141	2.87%	5,666	1.67%	3,290	2.19%	4,318
Los Angeles	58.46%	1,100,865	34.66%	652,662	2.03%	38,177	2.06%	38,806	2.80%	52,680
Sonoma	55.67%	94,424	34.84%	59,092	4.08%	6,918	2.25%	3,824	3.16%	4,364
Santa Clara	55.21%	229,135	38.20%	158,550	2.32%	9,643	1.98%	8,228	2.28%	9,448
Contra Costa	54.61%	159,819	39.44%	115,408	2.10%	6,152	1.75%	5,111	2.10%	6,151
Mendocino	53.49%	15,995	34.05%	10,181	5.85%	1,748	2.71%	811	3.90%	1,167
Solano	52.98%	53,721	41.06%	41,629	1.69%	1,710	1.78%	1,804	2.49%	2,531
Yolo	52.65%	27,862	41.53%	21,978	2.63%	1,390	1.59%	843	1.61%	850
Imperial	51.83%	11,256	39.98%	8,684	1.63%	355	2.33%	506	4.23%	918
Napa	50.83%	21,060	40.76%	16,889	3.66%	1,518	2.03%	842	2.71%	1,124
Humboldt	49.60%	23,242	38.04%	17,823	6.32%	2,962	2.84%	1,330	3.20%	1,499
Santa Cruz	46.97%	41,835	46.53%	41,440	3.18%	2,836	1.42%	1,268	1.89%	1,682
Lake	46.48%	8,895	43.35%	8,297	3.71%	711	2.45%	468	4.02%	768
Alpine	45.81%	235	46.39%	238	2.73%	14	3.12%	16	1.95%	10
Santa Barbara	44.89%	52,958	47.58%	56,126	2.31%	2,729	2.36%	2,781	2.86%	3,366
Sacramento	43.01%	149,784	50.90%	177,259	1.91%	6,668	1.88%	6,531	2.30%	8,031
Ventura	42.86%	91,274	49.94%	106,370	2.05%	4,356	2.49%	5,302	2.67%	5,679
Monterey	41.94%	36,571	53.13%	46,330	1.55%	1,349	1.42%	1,240	1.95%	1,703
San Joaquin	41.59%	56,203	51.77%	69,954	1.52%	2,059	2.16%	2,919	2.96%	4,000
San Diego	41.29%	310,049	52.81%	396,565	1.53%	11,503	1.81%	13,610	2.57%	19,246
San Bernardino	40.31%	134,751	51.88%	173,448	1.62%	5,431	2.77%	9,263	3.42%	11,422
Merced	39.83%	16,292	53.16%	21,747	1.55%	634	2.29%	935	3.18%	1,299
Del Norte	39.66%	2,608	50.67%	3,332	2.42%	159	3.10%	204	4.16%	273
Mono	39.69%	1,453	51.43%	1,883	3.55%	130	2.62%	96	2.71%	99
San Benito	39.37%	5,600	55.65%	7,916	1.32%	188	1.68%	239	1.98%	282
Riverside	38.13%	143,015	54.99%	206,247	1.36%	5,090	2.28%	8,564	3.24%	12,173
Stanislaus	38.12%	38,864	56.37%	57,465	1.45%	1,483	1.49%	1,515	2.57%	2,624
Trinity	38.13%	2,157	50.29%	2,845	3.94%	223	4.15%	235	3.48%	197
San Luis Obispo	37.87%	35,595	55.66%	52,318	1.91%	1,797	2.21%	2,074	2.35%	2,208
Nevada	37.14%	15,600	55.59%	23,351	3.06%	1,285	2.27%	955	1.94%	812
Butte	35.61%	24,016	55.66%	37,535	2.68%	1,807	2.54%	1,715	3.51%	2,364
Fresno	35.68%	61,297	58.21%	100,019	1.75%	3,003	1.83%	3,138	2.54%	4,357
Siskiyou	35.49%	5,777	56.37%	9,177	1.84%	299	2.52%	410	3.79%	616
Mariposa	34.08%	2,561	58.06%	4,363	2.49%	187	2.37%	178	3.01%	226
Orange	34.04%	239,447	58.56%	411,943	1.67%	11,762	2.36%	16,571	3.37%	23,700
Tuolumne	33.47%	6,945	58.93%	12,227	2.39%	495	2.30%	477	2.91%	604
Inyo	33.11%	2,097	57.89%	3,667	2.37%	150	3.19%	202	3.45%	218
Plumas	32.81%	2,848	60.04%	5,211	2.04%	177	1.87%	162	3.24%	281
Kings	32.69%	7,324	60.46%	13,544	1.49%	334	2.17%	486	3.19%	714
Calaveras	31.84%	5,585	59.65%	10,462	2.33%	408	2.91%	510	3.28%	575
Amador	31.22%	4,568	61.94%	9,063	1.70%	249	2.21%	323	2.93%	429
Madera	31.09%	9,242	62.21%	18,490	1.69%	502	2.04%	606	2.97%	882
Sutter	30.83%	7,206	63.44%	14,825	1.16%	271	1.87%	436	2.71%	632
Tulare	30.72%	20,885	64.14%	43,613	1.27%	863	1.52%	1,033	2.35%	1,598
Yuba	30.61%	4,181	60.72%	8,294	1.77%	242	2.88%	394	4.02%	549
Kern	30.13%	44,350	63.14%	92,930	1.34%	1,972	2.20%	3,241	3.18%	4,681
Tehama	30.13%	5,369	62.25%	11,094	1.57%	280	2.51%	447	3.54%	631
El Dorado	30.18%	19,998	63.19%	41,866	2.17%	1,435	2.10%	1,389	2.37%	1,570
Placer	29.95%	36,015	64.68%	77,761	1.64%	1,967	1.70%	2,047	2.03%	2,443
Shasta	29.69%	17,175	63.63%	36,803	1.39%	804	2.02%	1,171	3.26%	1,888
Colusa	29.34%	1,421	65.91%	3,192	1.14%	55	1.53%	74	2.09%	101
Sierra	28.77%	450	62.79%	982	2.43%	38	3.26%	51	2.75%	43
Glenn	27.41%	2,023	65.97%	4,869	1.41%	104	1.80%	133	3.42%	252
Lassen	27.07%	2,277	63.77%	5,363	2.33%	196	3.20%	269	3.63%	305
Modoc	25.34%	925	66.22%	2,417	1.78%	65	3.26%	119	3.40%	124

== See also ==
- California state elections, 1974
- State of California
- Secretary of State of California
