= Debra Bowen =

American politician (born 1955)

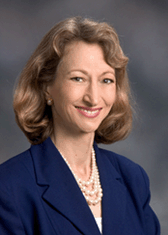

28th Secretary of State of California
- In office January 8, 2007 – January 4, 2015
- Governor: Arnold Schwarzenegger; Jerry Brown
- Preceded by: Bruce McPherson
- Succeeded by: Alex Padilla

Member of the California State Senate from the 28th district
- In office December 7, 1998 – November 30, 2006
- Preceded by: Ralph C. Dills
- Succeeded by: Jenny Oropeza

Member of the California State Assembly from the 53rd district
- In office December 7, 1992 - November 30, 1998
- Preceded by: Richard Floyd
- Succeeded by: George Nakano

Personal details
- Born: October 27, 1955 (age 70) Rockford, Illinois, U.S.
- Party: Democratic
- Spouse: Mark Nechodom (m. 2003; div. 2017)
- Children: 1
- Education: Michigan State University (BA); University of Virginia (JD)
- Profession: Lawyer; Politician

Debra Lynn Bowen (born October 27, 1955) is a former American attorney and politician who served as the Secretary of State of California from 2007 to 2015. Previously, she was a member of the California State Legislature from 1992 to 2006. In March 2008, she was given the Profile in Courage Award by the John F. Kennedy Presidential Library and Museum.

== Background and education ==
Bowen was born and raised in Rockford, Illinois, where she graduated from Guilford High School in 1973. She received her bachelor's degree in 1976 from Michigan State University, and her Juris Doctor in 1979 from the University of Virginia School of Law. In 1984, she started her own California law firm.

Motivated by the death of Robin Williams a few weeks earlier, in September 2014, her last year serving as Secretary of State, Bowen revealed that she has been battling depression since she had been in college. She vowed to continue to serve out the four months remaining in her term as Secretary of State.

== Career in politics ==
Bowen began her career in politics on the Neighborhood Watch and Heal the Bay. Her first elected office was to the California State Assembly, where she represented the 53rd Assembly District in the South Bay, Los Angeles area from 1992 to 1998. Bowen was first elected to the California State Senate, representing the 28th State Senate District, in 1998. Her district included all or portions of the cities of Carson, El Segundo, Hermosa Beach, Lomita, Los Angeles, Long Beach, Manhattan Beach, Redondo Beach, Torrance, Venice, and Wilmington. Bowen chaired the California Senate's Committee on Elections, Reapportionment and Constitutional Amendments. She also sat on the Energy, Utilities & Communications and Rules committees. Due to term limits, her service in the Senate ended in December 2006.

On June 6, 2006, Bowen faced Deborah Ortiz, another state senator, in the Democratic primary to run against Republican incumbent Bruce McPherson for the position of California Secretary of State. Bowen won the primary by a 61–39 margin. On the November 2, 2006 general election, she defeated McPherson by a margin of 3% popular vote.

Bowen was re-elected on November 2, 2010, over Republican Damon Dunn.

=== Candidacy for Congress seat ===
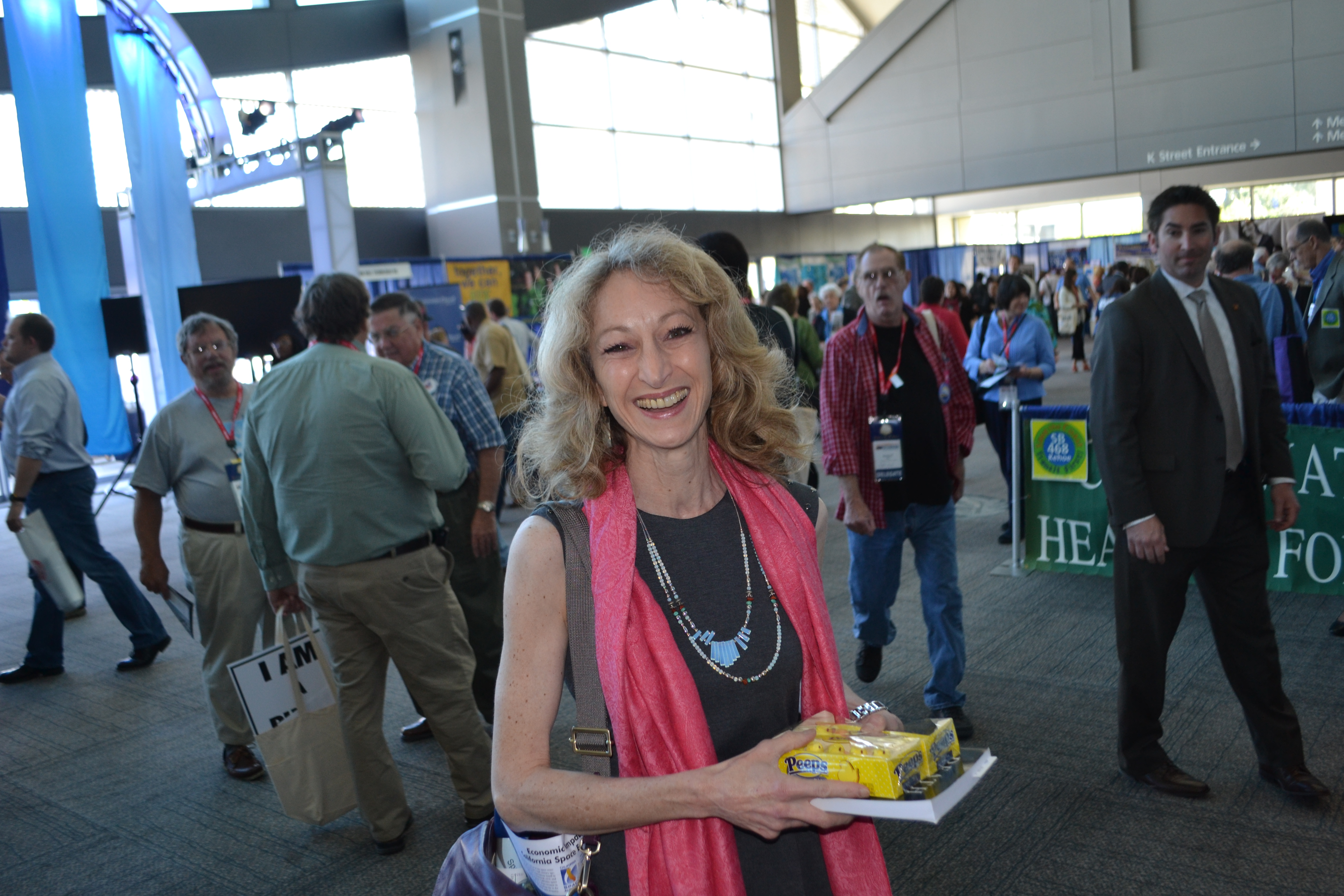
Bowen at the 2011 Democratic Party of California state convention

After incumbent Jane Harman announced she was vacating the seat, Bowen was widely discussed as a possible candidate for the 36th congressional district special election to replace her. On February 15, 2011, Bowen announced in an email to her supporters that she was entering the race. Her candidacy was endorsed by former Vermont governor and Democratic National Committee chairman Howard Dean, Democracy for America, the California League of Conservation Voters, and the California Nurses Association. She came in third, not qualifying for the general election for the seat.

== Policy interests ==
Bowen is known for her support of opening government to the Internet. In 1993, her first year in elected office, she helped to pass Assembly Bill (AB) 1624, which made all of California's bill information available on the Internet.

In May 2007, Bowen commissioned a "Top to Bottom Review" of California's electronic voting systems, to determine their security. On August 3, 2007, Bowen withdrew approval and certification and conditionally re-approved three electronic voting systems (Diebold Election Systems, Hart InterCivic, Sequoia Voting Systems), and rescinded approval of a fourth system, (Election Systems & Software), after the top-to-bottom review of the voting machines found the machines to be highly insecure. For these efforts she was awarded the Profile in Courage Award by the John F. Kennedy Presidential Library and Museum.

Bowen was interviewed for the January 16, 2008 broadcast of The NewsHour with Jim Lehrer and was the keynote speaker for the 2008 Usenix Security Symposium.

== Electoral history ==
California Secretary of State election, 2006
Party	Candidate	Votes	%
Democratic	Debra Bowen	4,032,553	48.09
Republican	Bruce McPherson (incumbent)	3,772,951	44.99
Green	Forrest Hill	181,369	2.16
Libertarian	Gail Lightfoot	171,393	2.04
American Independent	Glenn McMillon	135,824	1.62
Peace and Freedom	Margie Akin	91,483	1.09
Invalid or blank votes		513,486	5.77
Total votes		8,385,573	100.00
Turnout			39.29
Democratic gain from Republican			

California Secretary of State election, 2010
Party	Candidate	Votes	%	±%
Democratic	Debra Bowen (incumbent)	5,105,307	53.18%	+5.09%
Republican	Damon Dunn	3,666,407	38.19%	−6.80%
Green	Ann Menasche	286,694	2.99%	+0.83%
Libertarian	Christina Tobin	214,347	2.23%	+0.19%
Peace and Freedom	Marylou Cabral	164,450	1.71%	+0.62%
American Independent	Merton D. Short	162,102	1.69%	+0.07%
Total votes		9,599,307	100.0%	
Democratic hold				

California's 36th congressional district special primary, 2011
Party	Candidate	Votes	%
Democratic	Janice Hahn	15,647	24.6
Republican	Craig Huey	14,116	22.2
Democratic	Debra Bowen	13,407	21.1
Democratic	Marcy Winograd	5,905	9.3
Republican	Mike Gin	4,997	7.9
Republican	Mike Webb	3,895	6.1
Republican	Kit Bobko	2,296	3.6
Libertarian	Steve Collett	896	1.4
Republican	Stephen Eisele	788	1.2
Democratic	Dan Adler	361	0.6
Democratic	Loraine Goodwin	325	0.5
Peace and Freedom	Maria E. Montano	324	0.5
Republican	George Newberry	234	0.4
Independent	Matthew Roozee	157	0.2
Independent	Katherine Pilot	126	0.2
Independent	Michael T. Chamness	108	0.2
Total votes		63,582	100.0

California Assembly
Preceded by Richard Floyd	California State Assemblymember, 53rd District; December 7, 1992–November 30, 1998	Succeeded by George Nakano
California Senate
Preceded by Ralph C. Dills	California State Senator, 28th District; December 7, 1998–November 30, 2006	Succeeded by Jenny Oropeza
Political offices
Preceded by Bruce McPherson	California Secretary of State; January 8, 2007–January 4, 2015	Succeeded by Alex Padilla
