= Damon Dunn =

American football player (born 1976)

No. 81, 83, 87, 15
- Position: Wide receiver

Personal information
- Born: March 15, 1976 (age 50); Fort Worth, Texas, U.S.
- Listed height: 5 ft 9 in (1.75 m)
- Listed weight: 182 lb (83 kg)

Career information
- High school: Arlington (TX) Houston
- College: Stanford
- NFL draft: 1998: undrafted

Career history
- Jacksonville Jaguars (1998-1999)*; Cleveland Browns (1999); New York Jets (2000); Cleveland Browns (2000); Berlin Thunder (2000); Los Angeles Xtreme (2001); Dallas Cowboys (2001)*
- * Offseason or practice squad member only

Awards and highlights
- First-team All-Pac-10 (1995)

Career NFL statistics
- Receptions: 1
- Receiving yards: 6
- Return yards: 35
- Stats at Pro Football Reference

Damon Jerrel Dunn (born March 15, 1976) is a former American professional football player. After retiring from professional football, Dunn has worked as a commercial real estate developer and a minister. He has also twice run for public office in California.

== Early life ==
Dunn was born in 1976 in Fort Worth, Texas to a 16-year-old mother, Ramona Dunn. When Dunn was three years old, his father, Texas Longhorns starting wide receiver Mike Lockett, was killed in a car accident. Dunn grew up in a trailer on his grandparents' farm. Dunn was an honor student in Sam Houston High School in Arlington, Texas and an All-State Texas football player.

== College ==
After high school, Dunn attended Stanford University on a football scholarship after being recruited by Bill Walsh. Dunn also ran track at Stanford. At Stanford Dunn was coached by Tyrone Willingham and Dunn has said he viewed him as a father figure, having grown up without a male role model in his life. While at Stanford, Dunn set numerous records and was awarded an NCAA Academic Scholarship, All-Pac-10 Honors and Academic All-Pac-10 Honors, and the National Football Foundation and College Hall of Fame Award. During his career at Stanford, Dunn participated as an associate pastor in the Jerusalem Baptist Church, where he managed youth ministries.

== NFL career ==
Dunn graduated from Stanford in 1998 with a degree in public policy. He was not picked in the 1998 NFL draft. The season after he graduated from Stanford, Dunn was on the practice squad of the National Football League team Jacksonville Jaguars. Dunn then played for the Cleveland Browns in 1999. The next year, Dunn played in the Berlin Thunder of NFL Europe, the New York Jets of the NFL, and the Browns in 2000. In 2001, Dunn played for the XFL team Los Angeles Xtreme; the XFL folded after that season. Dunn joined Dallas Cowboys training camp before the 2001 NFL season. He left the NFL after being injured there.

== Other ventures ==
After retiring from the NFL, Dunn and a former Stanford roommate became partners in an Irvine, California-based real estate business, which developed several shopping centers.

== Politics ==
=== California Secretary of State ===
In 2009, Dunn announced that he would run for California Secretary of State challenging incumbent Democrat Debra Bowen. The Los Angeles Sentinel quoted Dunn: "There are a lot of African Americans that are conservative fiscally, but we don't have the welcoming face in the Republican Party."

In March 2010, Orly Taitz qualified to run for the office of California Secretary of State. At the same time, she unsuccessfully challenged the eligibility of her Republican Party primary opponent, Dunn, claiming that he was pretending to be a Republican. While playing for the Jacksonville Jaguars, Dunn had registered to vote as a Democrat in 1999 but that registration expired in 2005 after having failed to vote in two consecutive national elections.

On May 12, 2010, Pamela Barnett (named plaintiff from Taitz's lawsuit Barnett v. Obama) filed a lawsuit in the Sacramento County Superior Court alleging that Dunn was not eligible to run for Secretary of State.

The San Francisco Chronicle endorsed Dunn for the June 2010 primary. Ronnie Lott, a Hall of Fame NFL player, endorsed Dunn the following month.

Taitz was defeated by Dunn in the June 8 primary by a margin of about three to one, losing by over 900,000 votes.

On June 17, 2010, Taitz filed a lawsuit in the Orange County Superior Court contesting the election results, again alleging Dunn's ineligibility. On March 17, 2011, the judge ruled against Taitz. On May 1, 2012, a California Court of Appeal affirmed the superior court's ruling.

=== Mayor of Long Beach ===
In 2014 Dunn ran for Mayor of Long Beach. He qualified for the runoff by finishing second in the primary election, and faced Robert Garcia on June 3.

Dunn lost the election to Robert Garcia, former vice-mayor on June 3, 2014.

== Electoral history ==
California Secretary of State election, 2010
Party	Candidate	Votes	%
Democratic	Debra Bowen (incumbent)	3,786,174	53.1
Republican	Damon Dunn	2,751,863	38.6
Green	Ann Menasche	204,236	2.9
Libertarian	Christina Tobin	157,974	2.2
American Independent	Merton D. Short	121,023	1.6
Peace and Freedom	Marylou Cabral	120,338	1.6
Total votes		7,141,608	100.00
Democratic hold			

== Personal life ==
While in the NFL, Dunn worked with the Make-a-Wish Foundation visiting kids with terminal diseases. Dunn started the Fighting Giants Ministry that ministers to children with life changing injuries. Dunn has also worked with St. Augustine Soup Kitchen, the Cops-N-Kids program and the Cleveland Clinic Foundation. Dunn served as president of his local Fellowship of Christian Athletes chapter and has spoken nationally at FCA events. Dunn is also a licensed Baptist minister and a member of Antioch Church of Long Beach. He lives in Long Beach, California.
