= 2018 California Secretary of State election =

- November 6, 2018
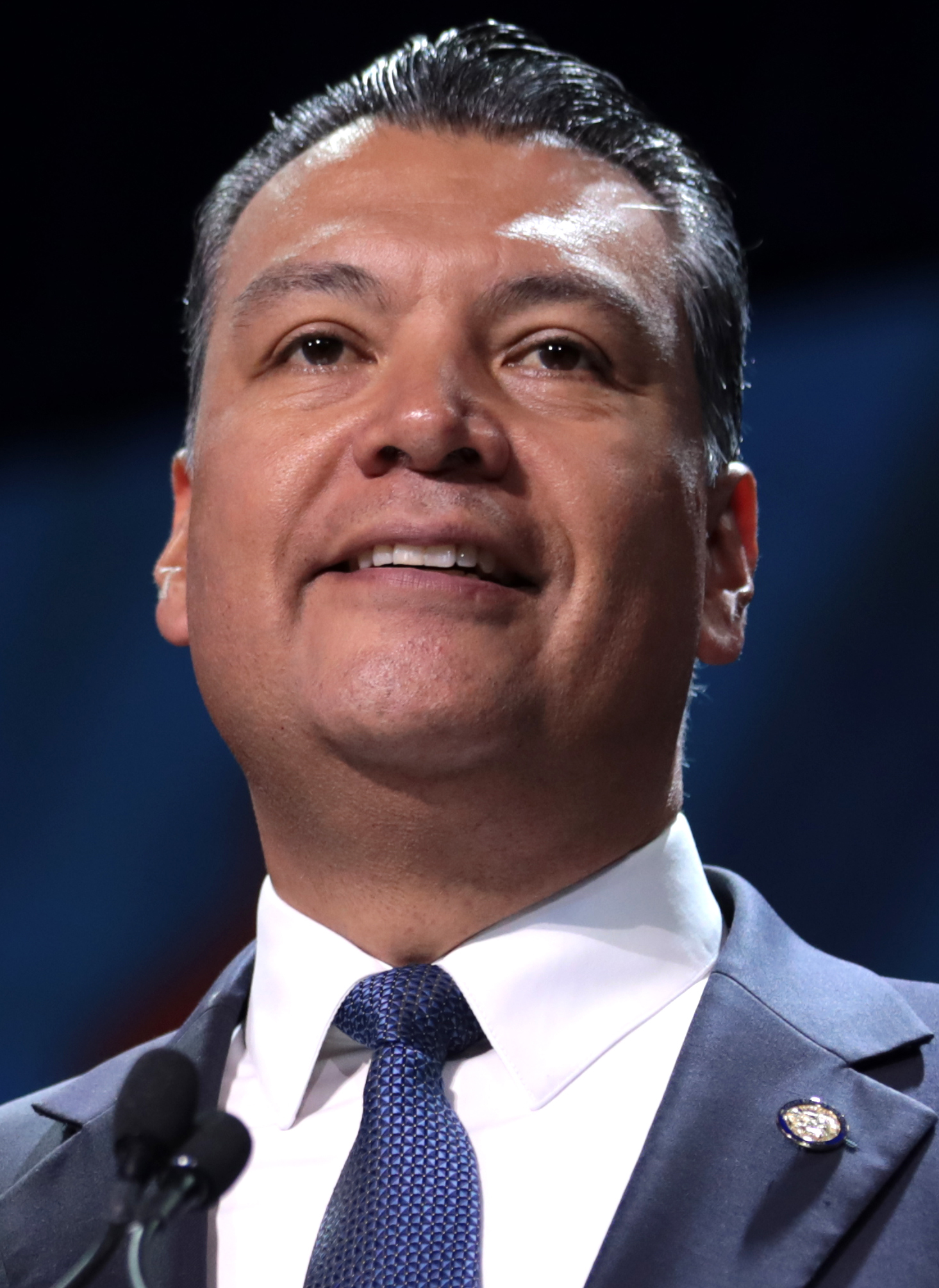

Candidate	Alex Padilla	Mark Meuser
Party	Democratic	Republican
Popular vote	7,909,521	4,362,545
Percentage	64.45%	35.55%
- County results Padilla: 50–60% 60–70% 70–80% 80–90% Meuser: 50–60% 60–70% 70–80%
Secretary of State before election
Alex Padilla
Democratic
Elected Secretary of State
Alex Padilla
Democratic

The 2018 California Secretary of State election was held on November 6, 2018, to elect the California Secretary of State. Incumbent Democratic Secretary Alex Padilla won re-election to a second term.

== Primary election ==
=== Candidates ===
==== Democratic Party ====
===== Declared =====
- Alex Padilla, incumbent California Secretary of State
- Ruben Major, paramedic

==== Republican Party ====
===== Declared =====
- Mark P. Meuser, election law attorney
- Raul Rodriguez Jr., warehousing employee

==== Green Party ====
===== Declared =====
- Michael Feinstein, former mayor of Santa Monica, Electoral Reform Consultant
- Erik Rydberg, electoral reform advocate, Community Organizer

==== Libertarian Party ====
- Gail Lightfoot, retired nurse

==== Peace and Freedom Party ====
===== Declared =====
- C.T. Weber, retired government analyst

=== Endorsements ===
Mike Feinstein (G)

Local-level officials

- Nathaniel Trives, former mayor of Santa Monica

Organizations

- Our Revolution East Bay
- Our Revolution Contra Costa
- SF Berniecrats

Individuals

- Joe Mathews, syndicated columnist
- Terry O'Day, Vice President of EVgo
- Lewis Perkins, CEO at Comprehensive Financial Solutions, Inc
- Grace Aaron, Vice President of Social Uplift Foundation
- Sam Hall Kaplan, writer
- Jason Islas, public affairs at Bird
- Wendy Girard, actress
- Rosemary Regalbuto, President -- Meals on Wheels West
- Paul Kawika Martin, senior policy and political director of Helping NGOs and Congress Strategically Change Foreign Policy
- Mark Stout, vice president Project Development at Amber Kinetics Inc.
- Marlene Wells, Green Party of Canada organizer
Ruben Major (D)

State-level officials

- Doug La Follette, Wisconsin Secretary of State

Local-level officials

- Gayle McLaughlin, former mayor of Richmond
- Mary Navarro, Orange County Board of Education, District 5

Organizations

- Progressive Democrats of America
- Resistance SF
- Justice Party of California
- Mira Costa College Democrats
- Revolution LA
- Pasadena Foothills Democratic Club
- San Francisco 4 Democracy PAC
- Our Revolution Humboldt (formerly Courageous Resistance of Humboldt)
- North County San Diego Progressive Democrats
- Our Revolution Long Beach
- Our Revolution West Marin
- Indian Rock Our Revolution
- Indivisible El Cerrito, El Cerrito, CA
- San Diego Progressive Democratic Club
- Democratic Socialists of America San Diego
- Justice Party of California
- Yolo County Progressives

Media

- San Leandro Talk
- OB (Ocean Beach) Rag
- San Diego Free Press

Individuals

- Ahmad Fayız Nawabi, Assembly Delegate, District 71
- Alec Bash, Democracy for America
- Aleita Huguenin, Former DNC Chair Western States Caucus, Assembly Delegate, District 8
- Alexis Edelstein, Assembly Delegate, District 62
- Allison Groves, DSCC Supervisorial District Delegate, Assembly District 35
- Amarnath Ravva, Assembly Delegate, District 51
- Andrea Smith, Previous Secretary of External Affairs, Cal Poly Pomona Associated Students Inc.
- Anthony Alexander, Assembly Delegate, District 25
- Antonio Robles, Assembly Delegate, District 76
- Atem Koul, Assembly Delegate, District 59
- Barbara Mead, Assembly District 76 Delegate
- Brian Fox, Original Author of GNU Shell
- Carolyn Fowler, Assembly Delegate, District 62
- Chinyere Nnodim Jack, Assembly Delegate, District 21
- Chris Barrosso, Electrical Engineer, Evolved Wireless, Inc., Assembly Delegate District 76
- Dan Mulherin, Assembly Delegate, District 70
- Dan Wood, Assembly Delegate, District 18
- David DeBus, PhD, Clinical Psychologist, Assembly Delegate, District 77
- Dr. Bill Honigman, Assembly Delegate, District 73, California State Coordinator, Progressive Democrats of America
- Hene Kelly, disability rights advocate
- Jeff Hayden, char of The California State Bar, Board of Legal Specialization
Mark P. Meuser (R)

State-level officials

- Bill Jones, former Secretary of State
- Mike Morrell, Senator
- Matthew Harper, Assemblyman
- Melissa Melendez, Assemblywoman
- James Gallagher, Assemblyman
- Heath Flora, Assemblyman
- Catharine Baker, Assemblywoman
- Steven Choi, Assemblyman
- Phillip Chen, Assemblyman
- Devon Mathis, Assemblyman
- Tim Donnelly, former Assemblyman

Individuals

- Pete Peterson, 2014 Candidate for Secretary of State

Organizations

- California Republican Party
- California Impact Republicans
- Silicon Valley Association of Republican Women
- California Republican Veterans Association
- Calaveras County GOP
- Contra Costa County GOP
- Del Norte County GOP
- Fresno County GOP
- Humboldt County GOP
- Lake County GOP
- Madera County GOP
- Nevada County GOP
- Sacramento County GOP
- San Benito County GOP
- San Bernardino County GOP
- Santa Barbara County GOP
- Santa Cruz County GOP
- Solano County GOP
- Sonoma County GOP
- Siskiyou County GOP
- Yolo County GOP

Newspapers

- Santa Barbara News-Press

=== Results ===
Results by county Padilla: 30–40%; 40–50%; 50–60%; 60–70%; 70–80%; Meuser: 30–40%; 40–50%; 50–60%

Nonpartisan blanket primary results
Party	Candidate	Votes	%
Democratic	Alex Padilla (incumbent)	3,475,633	52.57%
Republican	Mark P. Meuser	2,047,903	30.97%
Democratic	Ruben Major	355,036	5.37%
Republican	Raul Rodriguez Jr.	330,460	5.00%
Libertarian	Gail Lightfoot	155,879	2.36%
Green	Michael Feinstein	136,725	2.07%
Peace and Freedom	C.T. Weber	61,375	0.93%
Green	Erik Rydberg	48,705	0.74%
Total votes		6,611,716	100.00%

== General election ==
=== Predictions ===
Source	Ranking	As of
Governing	Safe D	October 11, 2018

=== Results ===
2018 California Secretary of State election
Party	Candidate	Votes	%	±%
Democratic	Alex Padilla (incumbent)	7,909,521	64.45%	+10.82%
Republican	Mark P. Meuser	4,362,545	35.55%	−10.82%
Total votes		12,272,066	100.00%	N/A
Democratic hold				

==== By county ====
County	Alex Padilla Democratic		Mark P. Meuser Republican		Margin		Total votes cast
County	#	%	#	%	#	%	Total votes cast
Alameda	461,216	81.74%	103,034	18.26%	358,182	63.48%	564,250
Alpine	394	65.34%	209	34.66%	185	30.68%	603
Amador	6,823	39.31%	10,536	60.69%	-3,713	-21.39%	17,359
Butte	43,959	50.42%	43,220	49.58%	739	0.85%	87,179
Calaveras	8,374	39.41%	12,874	60.59%	-4,500	-21.18%	21,248
Colusa	2,315	40.81%	3,357	59.19%	-1,042	-18.37%	5,672
Contra Costa	285,665	70.47%	119,682	29.53%	165,983	40.95%	405,347
Del Norte	3,646	44.08%	4,625	55.92%	-979	-11.84%	8,271
El Dorado	38,500	43.74%	49,518	56.26%	-11,018	-12.52%	88,018
Fresno	133,219	53.31%	116,669	46.69%	16,550	6.62%	249,888
Glenn	2,826	34.61%	5,340	65.39%	-2,514	-30.79%	8,166
Humboldt	34,912	67.06%	17,151	32.94%	17,761	34.11%	52,063
Imperial	22,501	67.81%	10,682	32.19%	11,819	35.62%	33,183
Inyo	3,370	46.86%	3,821	53.14%	-451	-6.27%	7,191
Kern	87,317	43.23%	114,667	56.77%	-27,350	-13.54%	201,984
Kings	12,897	43.09%	17,030	56.91%	-4,133	-13.81%	29,927
Lake	11,416	54.87%	9,391	45.13%	2,025	9.73%	20,807
Lassen	2,355	26.36%	6,580	73.64%	-4,225	-47.29%	8,935
Los Angeles	2,161,421	74.55%	737,684	25.45%	1,423,737	49.11%	2,899,105
Madera	16,204	42.45%	21,966	57.55%	-5,762	-15.10%	38,170
Marin	102,124	80.55%	24,666	19.45%	77,458	61.09%	126,790
Mariposa	3,351	41.02%	4,818	58.98%	-1,467	-17.96%	8,169
Mendocino	22,789	69.11%	10,184	30.89%	12,605	38.23%	32,973
Merced	32,366	55.40%	26,056	44.60%	6,310	10.80%	58,422
Modoc	948	27.84%	2,457	72.16%	-1,509	-44.32%	3,405
Mono	2,777	57.71%	2,035	42.29%	742	15.42%	4,812
Monterey	78,999	68.65%	36,076	31.35%	42,923	37.30%	115,075
Napa	37,287	67.15%	18,239	32.85%	19,048	34.30%	55,526
Nevada	29,501	55.29%	23,853	44.71%	5,648	10.59%	53,354
Orange	556,611	52.29%	507,861	47.71%	48,750	4.58%	1,064,472
Placer	76,825	44.44%	96,057	55.56%	-19,232	-11.12%	172,882
Plumas	3,702	40.65%	5,406	59.35%	-1,704	-18.71%	9,108
Riverside	333,319	52.39%	302,965	47.61%	30,354	4.77%	636,284
Sacramento	313,761	61.98%	192,460	38.02%	121,301	23.96%	506,221
San Benito	11,974	60.52%	7,810	39.48%	4,164	21.05%	19,784
San Bernardino	289,848	54.50%	241,940	45.50%	47,908	9.01%	531,788
San Diego	676,273	59.45%	461,313	40.55%	214,960	18.90%	1,137,586
San Francisco	309,367	87.66%	43,538	12.34%	265,829	75.33%	352,905
San Joaquin	108,189	56.58%	83,011	43.42%	25,178	13.17%	191,200
San Luis Obispo	67,667	54.46%	56,577	45.54%	11,090	8.93%	124,244
San Mateo	214,399	76.99%	64,088	23.01%	150,311	53.97%	278,487
Santa Barbara	97,183	63.61%	55,586	36.39%	41,597	27.23%	152,769
Santa Clara	439,258	72.94%	162,962	27.06%	276,296	45.88%	602,220
Santa Cruz	92,721	78.88%	24,823	21.12%	67,898	57.76%	117,544
Shasta	22,759	32.84%	46,542	67.16%	-23,783	-34.32%	69,301
Sierra	658	40.05%	985	59.95%	-327	-19.90%	1,643
Siskiyou	7,781	43.18%	10,239	56.82%	-2,458	-13.64%	18,020
Solano	92,567	64.20%	51,608	35.80%	40,959	28.41%	144,175
Sonoma	154,101	74.45%	52,884	25.55%	101,217	48.90%	206,985
Stanislaus	80,742	52.34%	73,525	47.66%	7,217	4.68%	154,267
Sutter	11,954	40.97%	17,225	59.03%	-5,271	-18.06%	29,179
Tehama	6,667	32.24%	14,012	67.76%	-7,345	-35.52%	20,679
Trinity	2,452	46.74%	2,794	53.26%	-342	-6.52%	5,246
Tulare	44,758	45.26%	54,134	54.74%	-9,376	-9.48%	98,892
Tuolumne	9,708	41.53%	13,670	58.47%	-3,962	-16.95%	23,378
Ventura	176,149	57.72%	129,011	42.28%	47,138	15.45%	305,160
Yolo	51,168	70.32%	21,601	29.68%	29,567	40.63%	72,769
Yuba	7,488	39.44%	11,498	60.56%	-4,010	-21.12%	18,986
Totals	7,909,521	64.45%	4,362,545	35.55%	3,546,976	28.90%	12,272,066

Counties that flipped from Republican to Democratic

- Butte (largest city: Chico)
- Fresno (largest city: Fresno)
- Merced (largest city: Merced)
- Mono (largest city: Mammoth Lakes)
- Nevada (largest city: Truckee)
- Orange (largest city: Anaheim)
- Riverside (largest city: Riverside)
- San Bernardino (largest city: San Bernardino)
- San Diego (largest city: San Diego)
- San Joaquin (largest city: Stockton)
- San Luis Obispo (largest city: San Luis Obispo)
- Stanislaus (largest city: Modesto)
- Ventura (largest city: Oxnard)
