= Robert Garcia (California congressman) =

American educator and politician (born 1977)

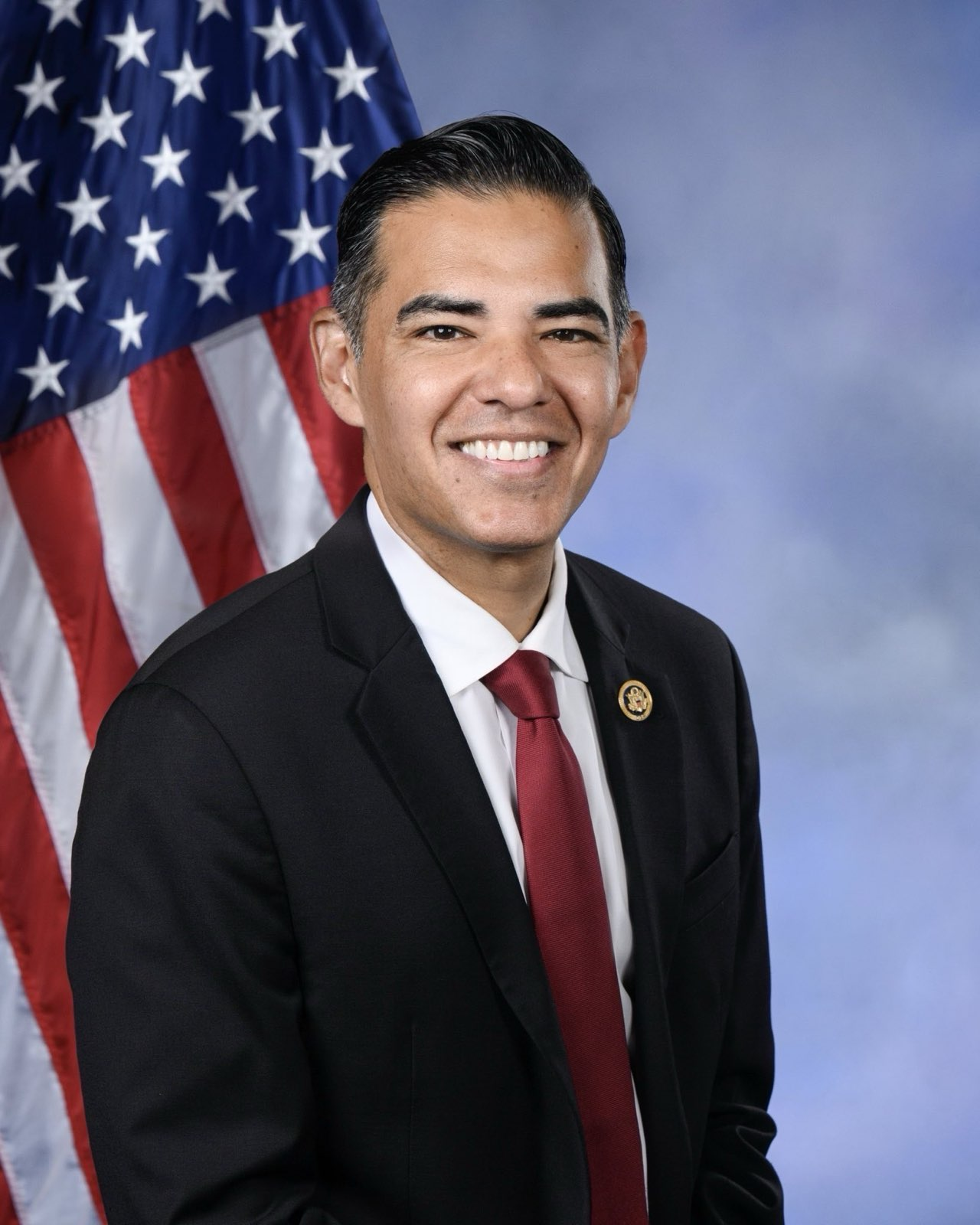
- Official portrait, 2025

Ranking Member of the House Oversight Committee
- Incumbent
- Assumed office June 24, 2025
- Preceded by: Stephen Lynch (acting)

Member of the U.S. House of Representatives from California's 42nd district
- Incumbent
- Assumed office January 3, 2023
- Preceded by: Lucille Roybal-Allard (40th district); Alan Lowenthal (47th district)

28th Mayor of Long Beach
- In office July 15, 2014 – December 20, 2022
- Preceded by: Bob Foster
- Succeeded by: Rex Richardson

Vice Mayor of Long Beach
- In office July 17, 2012 – July 15, 2014
- Preceded by: Suja Lowenthal
- Succeeded by: Suja Lowenthal

Member of the Long Beach City Council from the 1st district
- In office May 5, 2009 – July 15, 2014
- Preceded by: Bonnie Lowenthal
- Succeeded by: Lena Gonzalez

Personal details
- Born: Robert Julio Garcia; December 2, 1977 (age 48) Lima, Peru
- Party: Democratic (2007–present)
- Other political affiliations: Republican (before 2007)
- Education: California State University, Long Beach (BA, EdD); University of Southern California (MA)
- Website: House website Campaign website

Robert Julio Garcia (born December 2, 1977) is an American politician serving as the U.S. representative for California's 42nd congressional district since 2023. A member of the Democratic Party, he served as the 28th mayor of Long Beach, California, from 2014 to 2022. He was both the city's youngest and first elected openly LGBT mayor, as well as the first Latino to hold the office. He is the second person of color to be mayor of Long Beach, after Republican Eunice Sato, a Japanese American who served from 1980 to 1982. A former member of the Long Beach City Council, he was vice mayor from 2012 to 2014.

Garcia was elected to the United States House of Representatives in the 2022 midterm elections. He is the first Peruvian American to be elected to Congress, and was one of the leading figures in the expulsion of George Santos.

== Early life ==
Robert Julio Garcia was born in Lima, Peru, on December 2, 1977. He arrived in the United States with his mother in 1982, at age 5, on Visitors Visas. They became unlawful when they overstayed their visas. In 1986, through the Immigration Reform and Control Act, they applied for green cards. His mother and aunt worked in many jobs, such as housekeepers, to support the family. Garcia graduated from Covina High School in 1995, then attended California State University, Long Beach, where he became president of the Associated Students, was an active member of the Delta Chi fraternity, and graduated with a degree in communication studies. During college in his early 20s, Garcia became a United States citizen.

Garcia continued his education at the University of Southern California where he received a master's degree, and later became a public information officer at Long Beach City College. Garcia received his Doctor of Education degree in educational policy from California State University, Long Beach, in 2010. He has taught courses in communication and public policy at the University of Southern California, California State University, Long Beach, and Long Beach City College.

== Professional career ==
In 2007, Garcia founded the Long Beach Post, a website devoted to local news and sports reporting. The site soon became popular with local political figures and community leaders and gave him increased local prominence. He sold the website before being elected mayor.

Before and during his election to the Long Beach City Council, Garcia was a member of the public policy and communications faculty at the University of Southern California, and taught communication studies at California State University, Long Beach and Long Beach City College.

== Long Beach City Council (2009–2014) ==
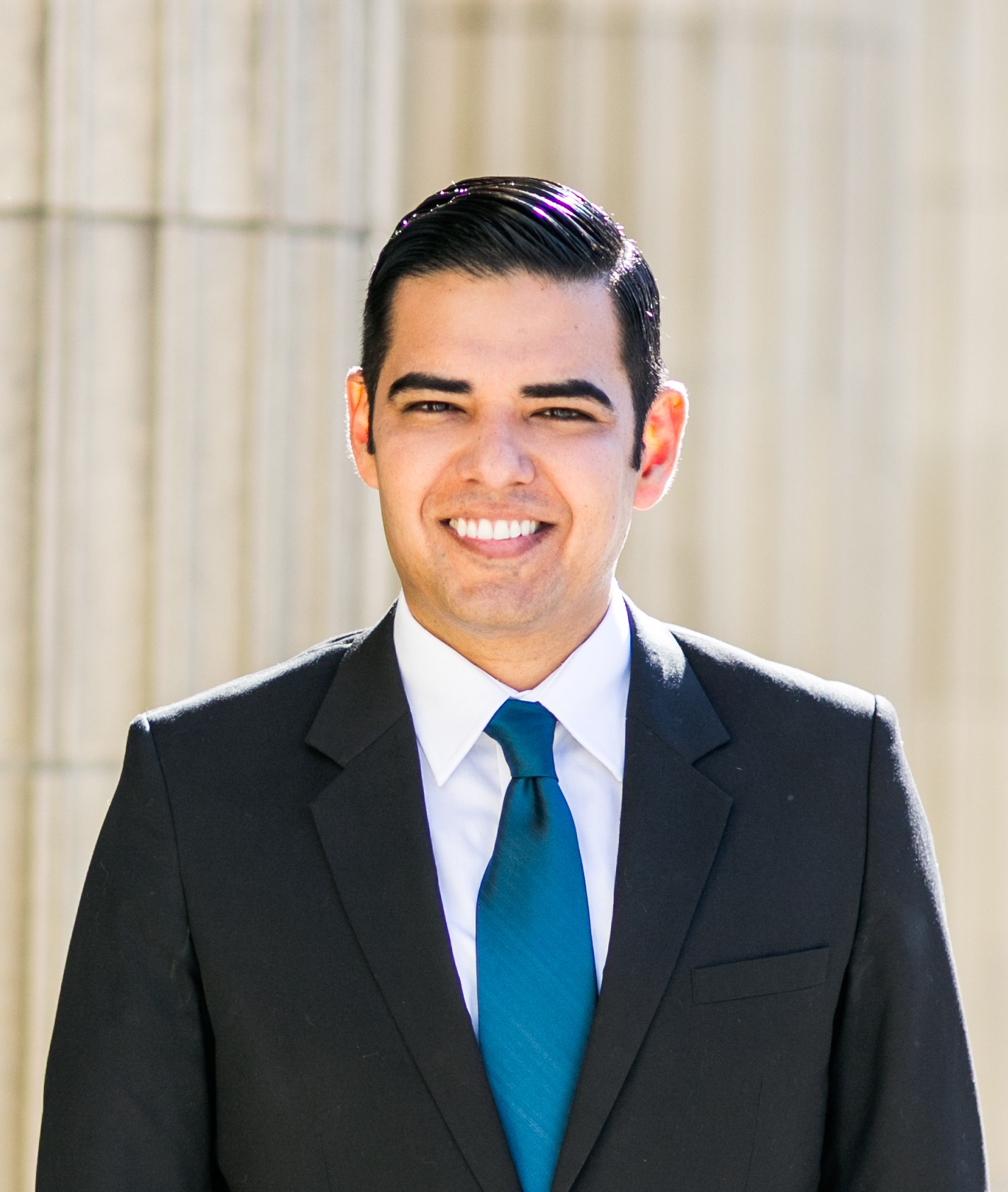
Garcia in 2013

In 2009, Garcia defeated six other candidates, including a former First District councilmember, to win the seat vacated when Bonnie Lowenthal was elected to the California State Assembly in 2008. He was reelected in April 2010 by more than 40 percentage points.

In July 2012, he was unanimously elected to a two-year term as vice mayor by the City Council, becoming the first Latino Vice Mayor in Long Beach and the youngest in the city's history.

During his time as a councilmember, Garcia authored or cosponsored more than 20 pieces of legislation, including the city's first Equal Benefits Ordinance, a ban on smoking at bus stops and at farmers' markets, a proposal to extend increased preferences to veterans in civil service hiring, and a broad-ranging arts initiative that eliminated restrictions on street performances, and reduced the business license tax for artists and other home-based businesses. He also showed support for both the business community and labor unions, voting to support Project Labor Agreements at the Long Beach Airport, Port of Long Beach and for the Gerald Desmond Bridge, supporting the expansion of the Middle Harbor Terminal, and working to improve infrastructure in commercial corridors. He has shown interest in government reform and fiscal accountability, and supported the City Manager's efforts to consolidate departments.

Garcia's support of the 2010 Long Beach Downtown Community Plan was criticized by some affordable housing advocates, who argued that the plan should be delayed to perform an economic study on affordable housing incentives. In response, Garcia argued that delaying the plan would be costly to the city, and that the economic study could be done separately. The plan passed the City Council, 7–2.

In 2011, Garcia spearheaded the effort to name a planned park in Long Beach's 1st District after murdered San Francisco Supervisor and LGBT civil rights icon Harvey Milk. The park, since named Harvey Milk Promenade Park, opened in 2013. Garcia has received national attention for his socially progressive views and the culturally diverse communities he represents, being young, Latino, and gay. He was featured in CNN's 2009 special "Latino in America," and was named to the "40 under 40 list" by the national gay news magazine The Advocate.

In January 2013, Garcia was appointed to the California Coastal Commission.

== Mayor of Long Beach (2014–2022) ==
=== Elections ===
In July 2013, after Bob Foster announced he would not seek reelection, Garcia announced his candidacy and entered the race for Long Beach mayor. He received 25.4% of the vote in the April 8, 2014, election, finishing first in a field of 10 mayoral candidates. In the runoff election between Garcia and Damon Dunn (22.3% of the vote) on June 3, Garcia won with 52% of the vote, and took office on July 15.

Garcia was reelected on April 11, 2018, with about 80% of the vote.

=== Tenure ===
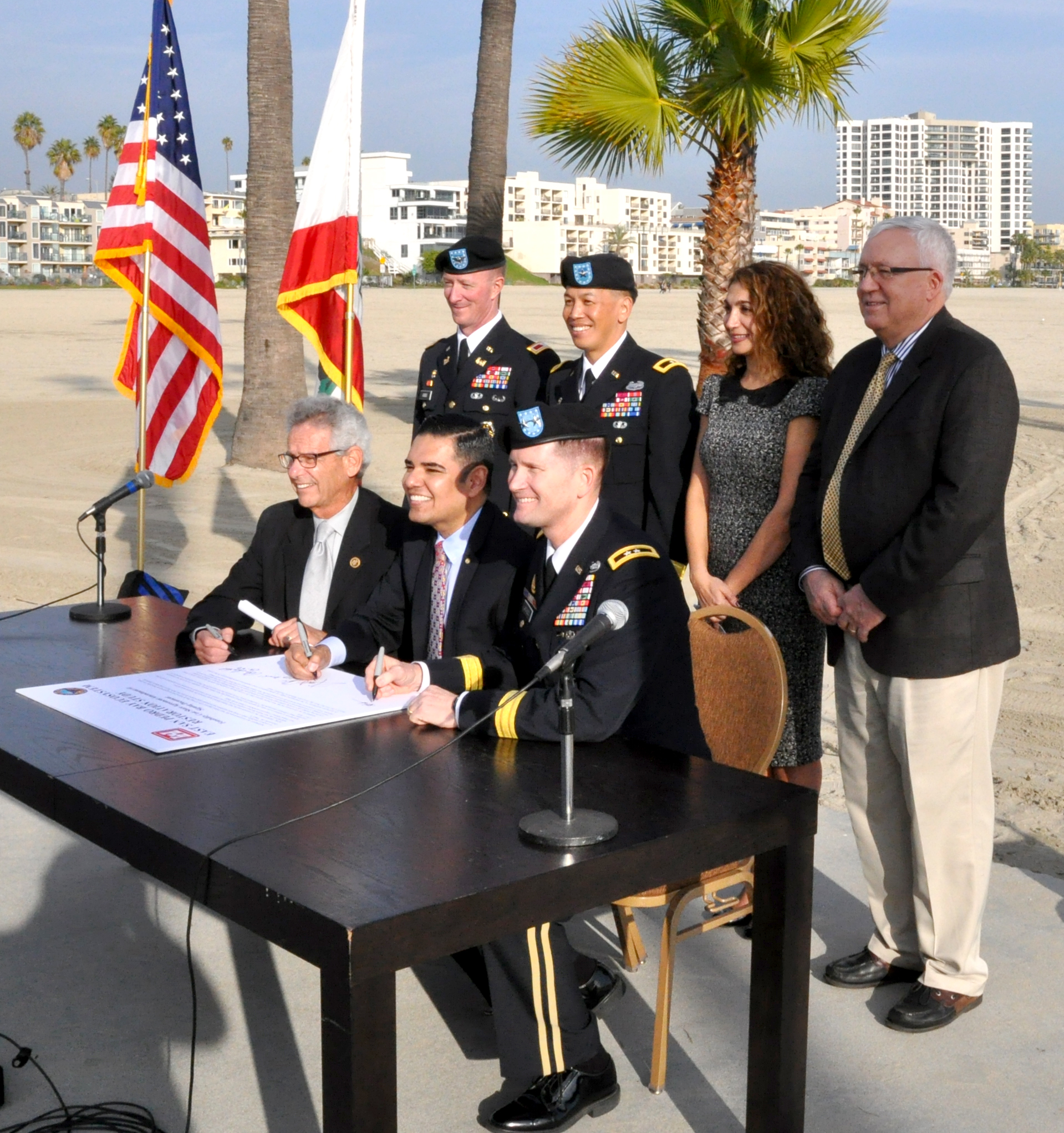
Mayor of Long Beach, Robert Garcia at a joint signing at the East San Pedro Bay study in 2016

Garcia's first 100 days as mayor were characterized by a focus on education and seating commissioners to fill vacancies on citizen commissions. He committed the City of Long Beach to joining local educational institutions as a signatory to the Long Beach College Promise, and announced a goal of universal preschool enrollment and doubling the number of internships in the city for local students. He appointed more than 60 commissioners, creating the most diverse slate of commissioners in the city's history. A majority of his appointments were women. His State of the City address used a large digital screen to display data and graphics, winning acclaim for its visual appeal and use of technology. The speech highlighted education, economic development, and sustainability, among other issues.

Garcia's focus on economic development has been exemplified by his revival of the inactive Economic Development Commission, and acquisition of a $3 million innovation grant from Bloomberg Philanthropies During his first term, construction on a new civic center began, and voters approved a temporary sales tax to support infrastructure and public safety, which Garcia initiated. Garcia focused on economic development, public safety and infrastructure, education, technology, and building housing.

As mayor, Garcia proposed 10 ballot initiatives for public safety, infrastructure, term limits, and creating ethics and redistricting commissions, among other things; each passed. This includes Measure BBB, which limited the number of terms the mayor can serve.

==== International trade and human rights ====
Garcia led America's second largest container port, the Port of Long Beach. During his tenure, he worked to implement climate goals and traveled the world to establish trade relationships with multinational companies and trading nations, including Japan, Korea, China, Taiwan, Singapore, Cambodia, Vietnam, Chile, Denmark, Peru, Switzerland and Germany. He visited Peru and Honduras in partnership with the Victory Institute and the State Department on missions to expand LGBTQ rights worldwide. He also visited Israel and the West Bank.

==== Labor and worker rights ====
Garcia fostered the first citywide Project Labor Agreement (PLA) between the City of Long Beach, the Los Angeles/Orange Counties Building and the Construction Trades Council to promote opportunities for local-hire on local-capital construction projects. Since its approval and implementation, 25 construction projects valued at more than $146 million have been built by a local labor workforce.

Garcia also supported the unionization of cannabis and hotel workers and the organization of dock and port laborers, and fought against attempts in the city to contract work outside of the community. He supported organized labor to increase workers' minimum wage before the California State Legislature took action. Most recently, he worked to pass the city's first recall and retention plan in response to workers laid off due to the COVID-19 pandemic.

==== Environment and climate change ====
In 2015, Garcia signed the Global Covenant of Mayors, a global coalition working to collectively reduce greenhouse gas emissions and enhance resilience to climate change. Following his lead, Long Beach continued its dedication to climate change action and developed its first-ever Climate Action and Adaptation Plan (CAAP). Through the CAAP, the City of Long Beach has partnered with over 30 local businesses to help reduce their environmental impacts. These Certified Green Businesses follow guidelines for energy and water conservation, pollution prevention, waste management, employee commute, and community education.

During his tenure, the Long Beach Port closely adhered to the Clean Air Action Plan. More recently, Long Beach banned Styrofoam, plastic straws, and plastic bags.

==== Public health ====
Garcia has said that he views access to health care as a fundamental human right and has been a strong supporter of Medicare for All. In 2020, he and Oakland Mayor Libby Schaaf formed Mayors 4 Medicare, a coalition of U.S. mayors dedicated to ensuring people across the country have access to health care.

Under Garcia, Long Beach also launched the Long Beach Black Infant Health Program, which aims to address the problem of poor birth outcomes affecting Black mothers and their infants.

=== Controversies ===
==== Mayoral campaign donation ====
The purchaser of the Garcia-co-owned Long Beach Post was Cindy Allen, whose firm ETA Advertising—where Garcia had recently worked as Public Relations Director—performed nearly $11,000 in work for Garcia's mayoral campaign which was never paid for, an apparent illegal in-kind campaign contribution far in excess of the $800 municipal limit at the time. The Garcia campaign "zero’d out" the unpaid bill in a campaign finance report after the election, referring to it as an “overestimate”. Allen's firm received numerous city contracts after Garcia became mayor, and he later supported her run for Long Beach City Council.

==== Past Republican activism ====
Garcia was the California Youth Coordinator for George W. Bush's 2000 presidential campaign. He also founded the Long Beach Young Republicans in 2005. Describing himself as socially liberal and fiscally conservative, Garcia guided and organized the Young Republicans, which developed a charter that was recognized as an official club by the Los Angeles County Republicans. Garcia also worked as an aide to Republican former vice mayor Frank Colonna when he was on the City Council and ran Colonna's unsuccessful bid in the 2006 Long Beach, California mayoral election.

Garcia changed his party registration to Democratic in 2007, the year before launching a campaign for city council in Long Beach's heavily Democratic District 1. He and his family originally registered as Republicans, Garcia has said, when they became citizens, in admiration of President Ronald Reagan signing the Immigration Reform and Control Act of 1986.

In the past, Garcia has been accused of lying about his time as a Young Republican activist, dismissing it as merely a previous party registration, during a time when he was “apolitical”.

While running for mayor, he told the Orange County Register that "he didn’t think about politics while in college and that rumors that he worked for the George W. Bush administration or campaign are untrue." Yet the paper concluded that "it turns out Garcia was much more involved than he claimed."

According to the Daily Bruin in 2000, “He landed the job of California Youth Coalition Coordinator for the Bush-Cheney campaign by writing letters to their national headquarters in Austin and walking into local GOP offices to volunteer to help elect Bush.”

Garcia was criticized for his past Republican activism in his first campaign for office for Long Beach City Council, as well as briefly during his primary campaign for mayor in a crowded field of candidates, when he competed unsuccessfully against Assemblywoman Bonnie Lowenthal for the local Democratic endorsement.

== State and national politics ==
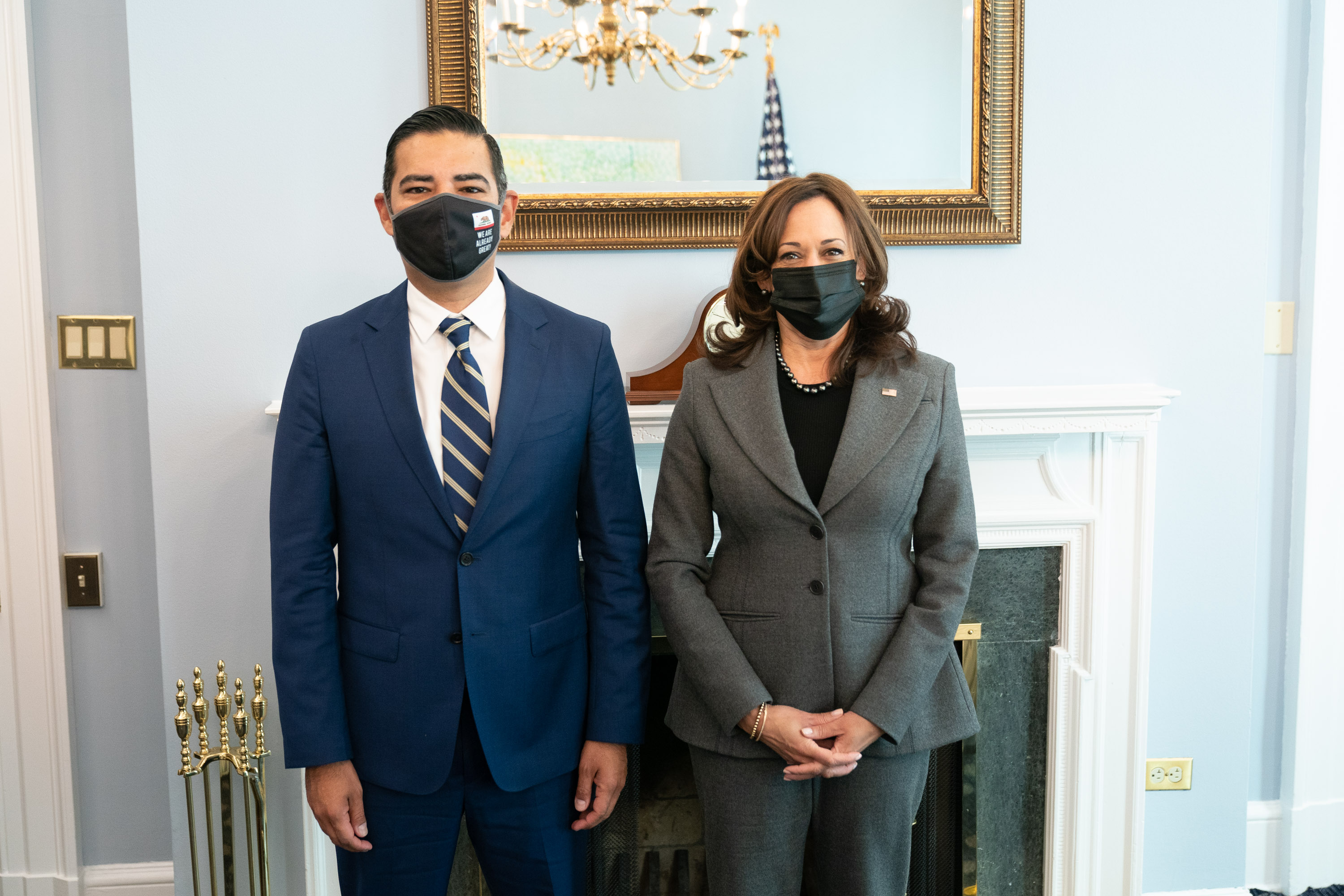
Garcia with Vice-President Kamala Harris in 2021

In December 2017, Garcia endorsed Gavin Newsom for governor, making him the first elected Latino to do so.

In May 2019, Garcia joined Newsom, Representative Barbara Lee and others in becoming a California state co-chair for Kamala Harris's 2020 presidential campaign. He was the only mayor to join state leaders as a co-chair. In July 2020, after Harris bowed out of the Democratic primary and she and Garcia endorsed Joe Biden, he went on to join the Latino Leadership Committee for the Biden campaign.

In July 2020, inspired by the George Floyd protests, a petition to recall Garcia was approved by the Long Beach City Clerk. Activists cited Garcia's "immoral leadership" and financial support from the Long Beach Police Officers Association, the union that represents local police. On November 9, 2020, the mayoral recall was canceled in the wake of the national election. Activist Franklin Sims claimed he and his supporters were being intimidated.

In August 2020, Garcia was selected as one of 17 speakers to jointly deliver the keynote address at the 2020 Democratic National Convention. This made him, Sam Park, and Malcolm Kenyatta the first openly gay speakers in a keynote slot at a Democratic National Convention.

In a February 2025 interview with CNN, when asked how Democrats could stop Elon Musk's influence in the government, Garcia said: "What the American public want is for us to bring actual weapons to this bar fight." The Department of Justice sent a letter to Garcia in response to the comments saying that it takes "threats against public officials very seriously." In a press release after he received the letter, he said: “No reasonable person would view my comments as a threat. We are living in a dangerous time, and elected members of Congress must have the right to forcefully oppose the Trump Administration. We will not be silenced."

== U.S House of Representatives ==
=== Elections ===
==== 2022 ====
On December 22, 2021, Garcia announced his candidacy for California's 42nd congressional district in the United States House of Representatives in 2022. The district had previously been the 47th, represented by Alan Lowenthal. Lowenthal and his colleague Lucille Roybal-Allard both announced that they were not running for reelection as California lost a congressional seat for the first time in its history. Garcia chose to swear his oath of office using the U.S. Constitution, a picture of his parents and an original Superman #1 the first issue of Superman’s eponymous comic series.

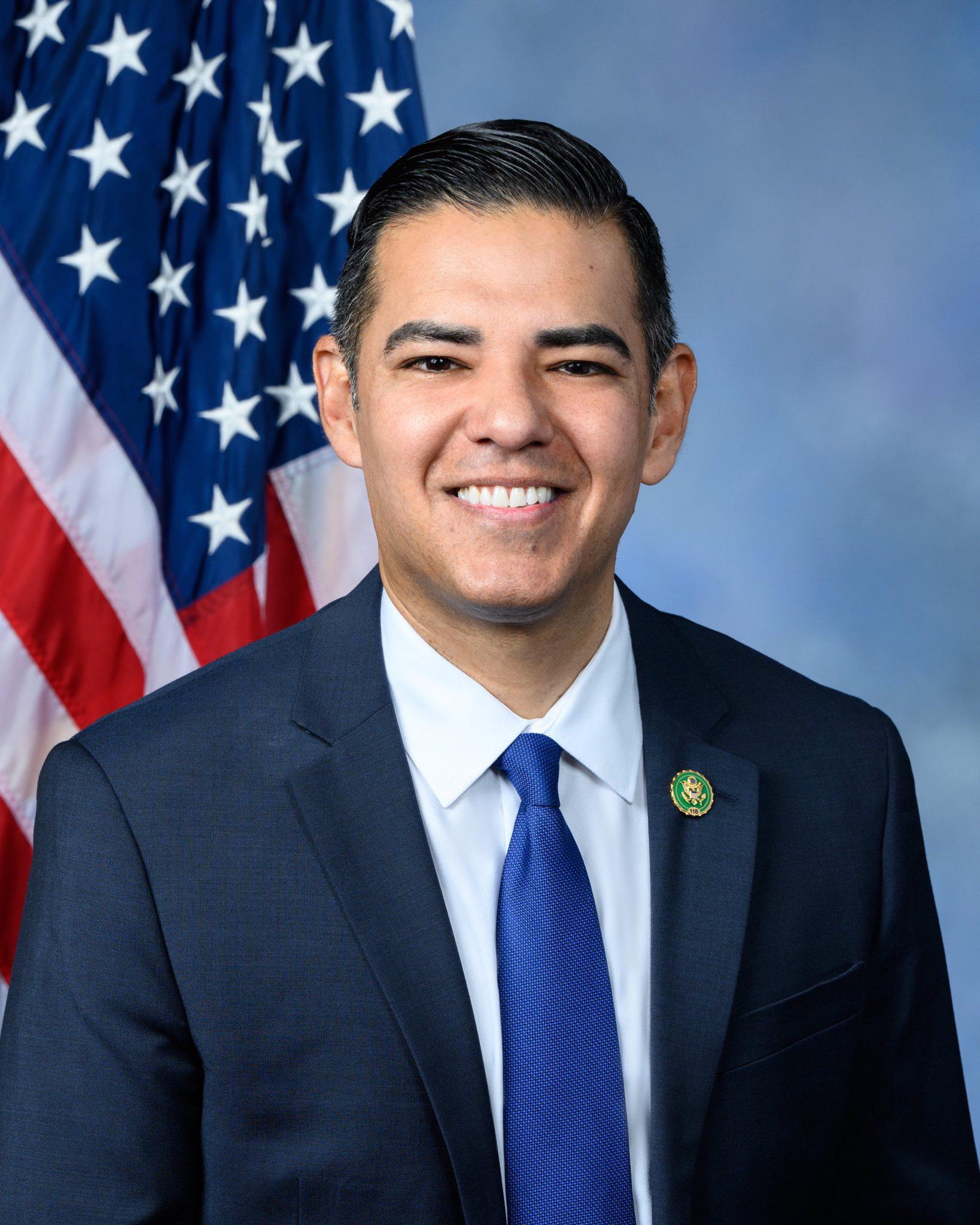
Official portrait, 2023

=== Tenure ===
Robert Garcia
(@RobertGarcia)
tweeted:

We did it. We expelled George Santos.

December 1, 2023

Garcia was one of the leading figures in the expulsion of George Santos as one of the representatives who filed motions to remove Santos from the House, including the one which ultimately led to the successful expulsion of Santos. Prior to the passage of the ultimately successful resolution, Garcia predicted that the motion would pass "overwhelmingly"; the final vote of the resolution was 311–114.

Garcia voted in favor of three military aid package supplementals for Ukraine, Israel, and Taiwan respectively in April 2024, along with most Democrats.

On November 18, 2025, Garcia co-sponsored a bill called The Stop Ballroom Bribery Act. It prevents future and present Presidents of the United States from accepting private donations and spending tax payer dollars to construct ballrooms or expand the interior of the White House in an effort to combat bribery of any United States President. Contributors would be unable to lobby the government for 2 years after donating.. The President and Vice-President would be unable to keep any leftover funds. It would ban donations from people who have conflicts of interest. The legislation would prohibit the President, Vice-President and their staff and families from soliciting funds. It would require members of Congress to approve any foreign governmental donors. Elizabeth Warren is sponsoring this legislation in the United States Senate.

In November 2025, Garcia sponsored a bill that would create a United States envoy to fight for the rights of Lesbian, Gay, Bisexual, Transgender, and Queer and Intersex (LGBTQ+) people who are not American citizens living outside of the United States. It would be the State Department of the US responsibility to strategize on how to end discrimination and violence against LGBTQ+ people worldwide. Ed Markey is sponsoring the bill in the United States Senate.

On 24 January 2026, Garcia called for abolishing ICE after the killing of Alex Pretti, and said that he would support Kristi Noem's impeachment.

=== Committee assignments ===
For the 119th United States Congress

- Committee on Oversight and Government Reform (ranking member)
  - Subcommittee on Military and Foreign Affairs
  - Subcommittee on Delivering on Government Efficiency
- Committee on Transportation and Infrastructure
  - Subcommittee on Aviation
  - Subcommittee on Coast Guard and Maritime Transportation
  - Subcommittee on Highways and Transit

Previous assignments:

- Committee on Homeland Security (2025)
- Select Subcommittee on the Coronavirus Pandemic

=== Caucus memberships ===
- Congressional Progressive Caucus
- Congressional Equality Caucus (co-chair)
- Congressional Freethought Caucus
- Congressional YIMBY Caucus (co-chair)
- Congressional Hispanic Caucus

== Personal life ==
On December 22, 2018, Garcia, who is openly gay, married his longtime partner, California State University, Long Beach professor Matthew Mendez. Mendez and Garcia have since divorced; Garcia is single and lives in Long Beach, California.

Garcia identifies as Catholic.

== Electoral history ==
=== City Council ===
2009 Long Beach City Council district 1 special election
Candidate	Votes	%
Robert Garcia	1,077	40.73
Evan Anderson Braude	826	31.24
Misi Tagoloa	360	13.62
Jana Shields	97	3.67
William Francisco Grisolia	34	1.29
Eduardo Lara	21	0.79
Total votes	2,644	100
Turnout	{{{votes}}}	17.48%

2010 Long Beach City Council district 1 election
Candidate	Votes	%
Robert Garcia	1,168	71.48
Jana Shields	466	28.52
Total votes	1,634	100
Turnout	{{{votes}}}	11.61%

=== Mayor ===
2014 Long Beach mayoral election
Candidate	First-round		Runoff	
Candidate	Votes	%	Votes	%
Robert Garcia	11,873	25.24	27,420	52.04
Damon Dunn	10,637	22.61	25,275	47.96
Bonnie Lowenthal	9,227	19.62		
Gerrie Schipske	7,192	15.29		
Doug Otto	6,363	13.53		
Jana Shields	1,017	2.16		
Steven Paul Mozena	230	0.49		
Eric Rock	205	0.44		
Mineo L. Gonzalez	185	0.39		
Richard Anthony Camp	107	0.23		
Total	47,036	100	52,695	100
Voter turnout	18.25%		20.53%	

2018 Long Beach mayoral election
Candidate	Votes	%
Robert Garcia (incumbent)	31,112	78.78
James Henry "Henk" Conn	8,379	21.22
Total votes	39,491	100
Turnout	{{{votes}}}	15.10%

=== U.S. House of Representatives ===
2022 California's 42nd congressional district election
Primary election
Party	Candidate	Votes	%
Democratic	Robert Garcia	43,406	46.7
Republican	John Briscoe	24,319	26.1
Democratic	Cristina Garcia	11,685	12.6
Democratic	Peter Mathews	3,415	3.7
Democratic	Nicole López	3,164	3.4
Green	Julio Flores	2,491	2.7
Democratic	William Summerville	2,301	2.5
Democratic	Joaquín Beltrán	2,254	2.4
Total votes		93,035	100.0
General election
Democratic	Robert Garcia	99,217	68.4
Republican	John Briscoe	45,903	31.6
Total votes		145,120	100.0
Democratic hold			

2024 California's 42nd congressional district election
Primary election
Party	Candidate	Votes	%
Democratic	Robert Garcia (incumbent)	49,891	52.1
Republican	John Briscoe	30,599	31.9
Democratic	Nicole López	8,758	9.1
Democratic	Joaquin Beltran	6,532	6.8
Total votes		95,780	100.0
General election
Democratic	Robert Garcia (incumbent)	159,153	68.1
Republican	John Briscoe	74,410	31.9
Total votes		233,563	100.0
Democratic hold			

== See also ==
- List of Hispanic and Latino Americans in the United States Congress
- List of mayors of the 50 largest cities in the United States
- List of Democratic National Convention keynote speakers

Political offices
Preceded by Bob Foster	Mayor of Long Beach; 2014–2022	Succeeded by Rex Richardson
Party political offices
Preceded by Elizabeth Warren	Keynote Speaker of the Democratic National Convention; 2020; Served alongside: Stacey Abrams, Raumesh Akbari, Colin Allred, Brendan Boyle, Yvanna Cancela, Kathleen Clyde, Nikki Fried, Malcolm Kenyatta, Marlon Kimpson, Conor Lamb, Mari Manoogian, Victoria Neave, Jonathan Nez, Sam Park, Denny Ruprecht, Randall Woodfin	Succeeded by Angela Alsobrooks
U.S. House of Representatives
Preceded by Ken Calvert	Member of the U.S. House of Representatives from California's 42nd congressional district 2023–present	Incumbent
Preceded by Stephen Lynch; Acting	Ranking Member of the House Oversight Committee; 2025–present	Incumbent
U.S. order of precedence (ceremonial)
Preceded by Russell Fry	United States representatives by seniority 310th	Succeeded by Marie Gluesenkamp Perez
