= 2018 Long Beach, California, mayoral election =

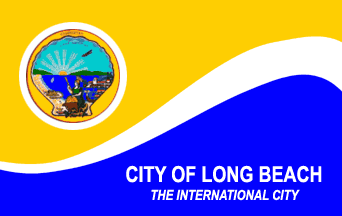
- April 10, 2018
- Turnout: 15.10%
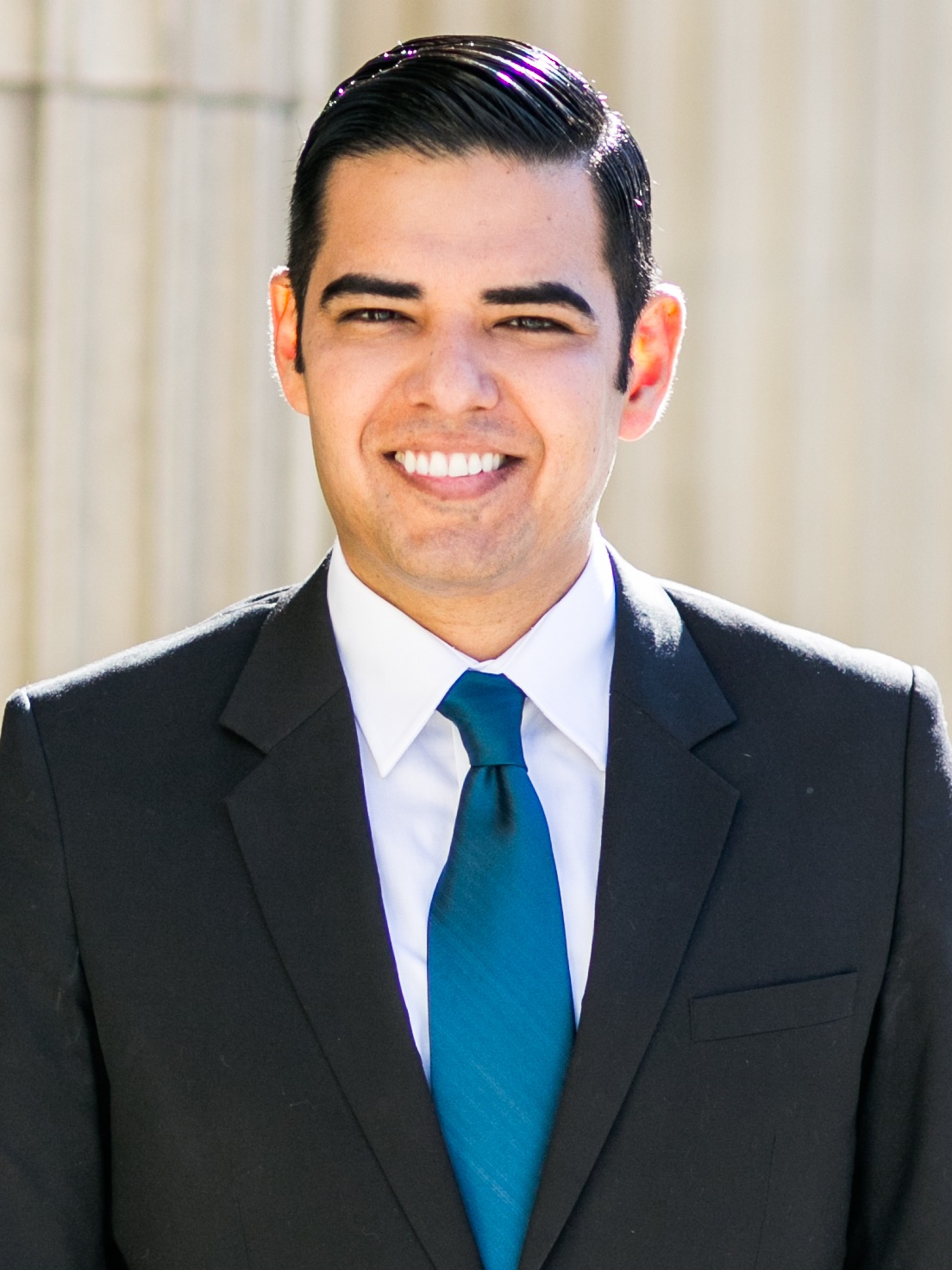

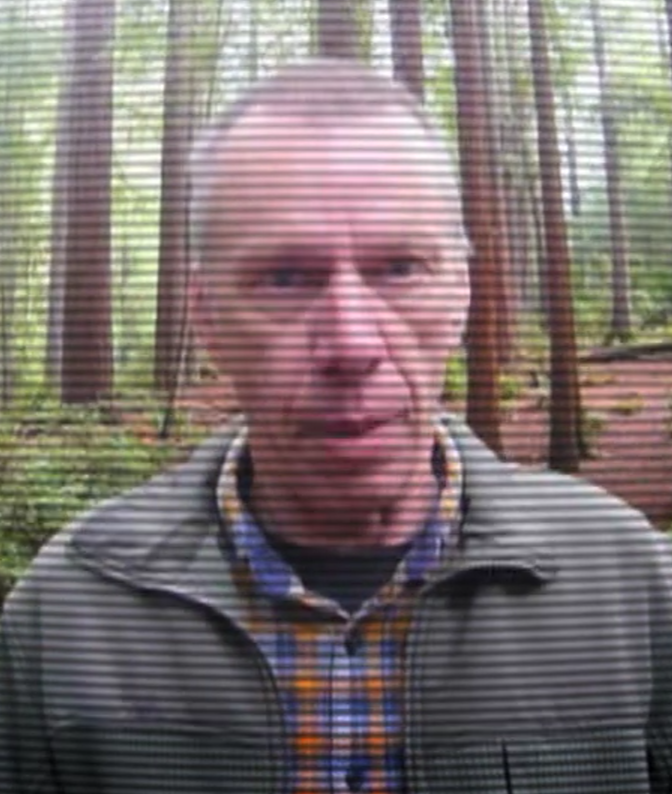
Candidate	Robert Garcia	James Henry "Henk" Conn
Popular vote	31,112	8,379
Percentage	78.78%	21.22%
Mayor before election
Dr. Robert Garcia
Elected mayor
Dr. Robert Garcia

Long Beach, California, held an election for mayor on April 10, 2018. It saw the reelection of Dr. Robert Garcia.

Since Garcia won a majority in the first round, no runoff was needed. Turnout was low, at 15.1%.

Municipal elections in California are officially non-partisan.

== Results ==
Results
Candidate	Votes	%	±
Dr. Robert Garcia	31,112	78.78%	+27.94%
James Henry "Henk" Conn	8,379	21.22%	N/A
Total votes	39,491	100%	N/A
