= California Ocean Science Trust =

American public-benefit nonprofit corporation

- Type: public-benefit corporation
- Legal status: 501(c)(3)
- Executive Director: Liz Whiteman
- Website: www.oceansciencetrust.org

California Ocean Science Trust (OST) is a nonprofit 501(c)(3) public-benefit corporation established pursuant to the California Ocean Resources Stewardship Act (CORSA) of 2000. The mission of OST is to advance a constructive role for science in decision-making by promoting collaboration and mutual understanding among scientists, citizens, managers, and policymakers working toward sustained, healthy, and productive coastal and ocean ecosystems. Because OST is not a government entity, it can act as an independent and unbiased broker between policymakers and managers, and the scientific community.

To achieve its mission and align with the purposes laid out in the enabling legislation, OST has two overarching organizational goals: 1) Facilitate two-way connections between the worlds of science and California coastal ocean policy and management and 2) Institutionalize the integration of the best science into California coastal ocean policy and decision-making.

== Programs ==
=== MPA Monitoring ===
Ocean Science Trust partnered with the state to lead the development and implementation of impartial, scientifically rigorous, and cost-effective monitoring of the statewide marine protected area (MPA) network established under the California Marine Life Protection Act (MLPA). Working at the boundary between science and management, MPA Monitoring provided a science and policy expertise to implement monitoring to assess ecosystem condition and evaluate the performance of the statewide MPA network.

=== Science Advising ===
OST provides science support and services to California state agencies and entities by coordinating expert advice, providing scientific review, advice, and feedback, and acting as a liaison and bridging institution between experts, producers of science, and decision-makers. OST's key partner in its science-support function is the California Ocean Protection Council (OPC), a cabinet-level body that spans across multiple agencies responsible for ocean and coastal jurisdictions. The OPC solicits the best available science to support its policy decisions and recommendations, making the Council an objective, nonpartisan body. While OST supports this mission through a number of activities, in particular OST's Executive Director serves as Science Advisor to the OPC and co-chair of the OPC Science Advisory Team (OPC-SAT).

=== Science Initiatives ===
OST develops and implements a variety of science initiatives to span the complex nexus between science, policy, and management. OST’s initiatives are diverse, including coordination of project teams to conduct needed scientific studies to inform better ocean policy and management decisions, such as the Oil and Gas Decommissioning Study, the Marine Debris Report, and the Coastal and Marine Spatial Planning initiative.

== See also ==
- Marine Life Protection Act
- Marine Debris
- Marine Pollution
- Marine Spatial Planning
