= List of United States representatives in the 84th Congress =

This is a complete list of United States representatives during the 84th United States Congress listed by seniority.

As an historical article, the districts and party affiliations listed reflect those during the 84th Congress (January 3, 1955 – January 3, 1957). Seats and party affiliations on similar lists for other congresses will be different for certain members.

Seniority depends on the date on which members were sworn into office. Since many members are sworn in on the same day, subsequent ranking is based on previous congressional service of the individual and then by alphabetical order by the last name of the representative.

Committee chairmanship in the House is often associated with seniority. However, party leadership is typically not associated with seniority.

Note: The "*" indicates that the representative/delegate may have served one or more non-consecutive terms while in the House of Representatives of the United States Congress.

== U.S. House seniority list ==
U.S. House seniority
| Rank | Representative | Party | District | Seniority date (Previous service, if any) | No.# of term(s) | Notes |
|---|---|---|---|---|---|---|
| 1 | Sam Rayburn | D | TX-04 | March 4, 1913 | 22nd term | Dean and Speaker of the House |
| 2 | Carl Vinson | D | GA-06 | November 3, 1914 | 22nd term | |
| 3 | Daniel A. Reed | R | NY-43 | March 4, 1919 | 19th term | |
| 4 | Clarence Cannon | D | MO-09 | March 4, 1923 | 17th term | |
| 5 | Emanuel Celler | D | NY-11 | March 4, 1923 | 17th term | |
| 6 | John Taber | R | NY-36 | March 4, 1923 | 17th term | |
| 7 | Joseph William Martin Jr. | R | MA-14 | March 4, 1925 | 16th term | |
| 8 | Thomas A. Jenkins | R | OH-10 | March 4, 1925 | 16th term | |
| 9 | Edith Nourse Rogers | R | MA-05 | June 30, 1925 | 16th term | |
| 10 | Clifford R. Hope | R | KS-05 | March 4, 1927 | 15th term | Left the House in 1957. |
| 11 | Charles A. Wolverton | R | NJ-01 | March 4, 1927 | 15th term | |
| 12 | John William McCormack | D | MA-12 | November 6, 1928 | 15th term | |
| 13 | Richard B. Wigglesworth | R | MA-13 | November 6, 1928 | 15th term | |
| 14 | Jere Cooper | D | TN-08 | March 4, 1929 | 14th term | |
| 15 | Wright Patman | D | TX-01 | March 4, 1929 | 14th term | |
| 16 | Howard W. Smith | D | VA-08 | March 4, 1931 | 13th term | |
| 17 | Brent Spence | D | KY-05 | March 4, 1931 | 13th term | |
| 18 | Jesse P. Wolcott | R | MI-07 | March 4, 1931 | 13th term | Left the House in 1957. |
| 19 | Leo E. Allen | R | IL-16 | March 4, 1933 | 12th term | |
| 20 | William M. Colmer | D | MS-06 | March 4, 1933 | 12th term | |
| 21 | John D. Dingell Sr. | D | MI-15 | March 4, 1933 | 12th term | Died on September 19, 1955. |
| 22 | George Anthony Dondero | R | MI-18 | March 4, 1933 | 12th term | Left the House in 1957. |
| 23 | James P. Richards | D | SC-05 | March 4, 1933 | 12th term | Left the House in 1957. |
| 24 | Francis E. Walter | D | PA-15 | March 4, 1933 | 12th term | |
| 25 | Paul Brown | D | GA-10 | July 5, 1933 | 12th term | |
| 26 | Harold D. Cooley | D | NC-04 | July 7, 1934 | 12th term | |
| 27 | August H. Andresen | R | MN-01 | January 3, 1935; Previous service, 1925–1933. | 15th term* | |
| 28 | Leslie C. Arends | R | IL-17 | January 3, 1935 | 11th term | |
| 29 | Graham A. Barden | D | NC-03 | January 3, 1935 | 11th term | |
| 30 | Charles A. Buckley | D | NY-24 | January 3, 1935 | 11th term | |
| 31 | W. Sterling Cole | R | NY-37 | January 3, 1935 | 11th term | |
| 32 | Clare Hoffman | R | MI-04 | January 3, 1935 | 11th term | |
| 33 | George H. Mahon | D | TX-19 | January 3, 1935 | 11th term | |
| 34 | Chauncey W. Reed | R | IL-14 | January 3, 1935 | 11th term | Died on February 9, 1956. |
| 35 | Dewey Jackson Short | R | MO-07 | January 3, 1935; Previous service, 1929–1931. | 12th term* | Left the House in 1957. |
| 36 | Charles A. Halleck | R | IN-02 | January 29, 1935 | 11th term | |
| 37 | Frank W. Boykin | D | AL-01 | July 30, 1935 | 11th term | |
| 38 | Overton Brooks | D | LA-04 | January 3, 1937 | 10th term | |
| 39 | Herman P. Eberharter | D | PA-28 | January 3, 1937 | 10th term | |
| 40 | Noble Jones Gregory | D | KY-01 | January 3, 1937 | 10th term | |
| 41 | Eugene James Keogh | D | NY-09 | January 3, 1937 | 10th term | |
| 42 | Michael J. Kirwan | D | OH-19 | January 3, 1937 | 10th term | |
| 43 | Noah M. Mason | R | IL-15 | January 3, 1937 | 10th term | |
| 44 | William R. Poage | D | TX-11 | January 3, 1937 | 10th term | |
| 45 | Edward Herbert Rees | R | KS-04 | January 3, 1937 | 10th term | |
| 46 | Harry R. Sheppard | D | CA-27 | January 3, 1937 | 10th term | |
| 47 | Albert Thomas | D | TX-08 | January 3, 1937 | 10th term | |
| 48 | Richard M. Simpson | R | PA-18 | May 11, 1937 | 10th term | |
| 49 | Ralph A. Gamble | R | NY-26 | November 2, 1937 | 10th term | Left the House in 1957. |
| 50 | George M. Grant | D | AL-02 | June 14, 1938 | 10th term | |
| 51 | Herman Carl Andersen | R | MN-07 | January 3, 1939 | 9th term | |
| 52 | Clarence J. Brown | R | OH-07 | January 3, 1939 | 9th term | |
| 53 | Robert B. Chiperfield | R | IL-19 | January 3, 1939 | 9th term | |
| 54 | Cliff Clevenger | R | OH-05 | January 3, 1939 | 9th term | |
| 55 | Carl T. Durham | D | NC-06 | January 3, 1939 | 9th term | |
| 56 | Ivor D. Fenton | R | PA-12 | January 3, 1939 | 9th term | |
| 57 | Ezekiel C. Gathings | D | AR-01 | January 3, 1939 | 9th term | |
| 58 | John Carl Hinshaw | R | CA-20 | January 3, 1939 | 9th term | Died on August 5, 1956. |
| 59 | Ben F. Jensen | R | IA-07 | January 3, 1939 | 9th term | |
| 60 | Robert Kean | R | NJ-12 | January 3, 1939 | 9th term | |
| 61 | Paul J. Kilday | D | TX-20 | January 3, 1939 | 9th term | |
| 62 | Karl M. LeCompte | R | IA-04 | January 3, 1939 | 9th term | |
| 63 | John L. McMillan | D | SC-06 | January 3, 1939 | 9th term | |
| 64 | Wilbur Mills | D | AR-02 | January 3, 1939 | 9th term | |
| 65 | William F. Norrell | D | AR-06 | January 3, 1939 | 9th term | |
| 66 | Henry O. Talle | R | IA-02 | January 3, 1939 | 9th term | |
| 67 | John Martin Vorys | R | OH-12 | January 3, 1939 | 9th term | |
| 68 | Clarence E. Kilburn | R | NY-33 | February 13, 1940 | 9th term | |
| 69 | Clifford Davis | D | TN-09 | February 14, 1940 | 9th term | |
| 70 | Frances P. Bolton | R | OH-22 | February 27, 1940 | 9th term | |
| 71 | J. Harry McGregor | R | OH-17 | February 27, 1940 | 9th term | |
| 72 | Herbert Covington Bonner | D | NC-01 | November 5, 1940 | 9th term | |
| 73 | Gordon Canfield | R | NJ-08 | January 3, 1941 | 8th term | |
| 74 | Paul Cunningham | R | IA-05 | January 3, 1941 | 8th term | |
| 75 | Aime Forand | D | RI-01 | January 3, 1941; Previous service, 1937–1939. | 9th term* | |
| 76 | Oren Harris | D | AR-04 | January 3, 1941 | 8th term | |
| 77 | Felix Edward Hébert | D | LA-01 | January 3, 1941 | 8th term | |
| 78 | William S. Hill | R | CO-02 | January 3, 1941 | 8th term | |
| 79 | Augustine B. Kelley | D | PA-21 | January 3, 1941 | 8th term | |
| 80 | Joseph O'Hara | R | MN-02 | January 3, 1941 | 8th term | |
| 81 | Percy Priest | D | TN-05 | January 3, 1941 | 8th term | Died on October 12, 1956. |
| 82 | L. Mendel Rivers | D | SC-01 | January 3, 1941 | 8th term | |
| 83 | Earl Wilson | R | IN-09 | January 3, 1941 | 8th term | |
| 84 | Lawrence H. Smith | R | WI-01 | August 29, 1941 | 8th term | |
| 85 | Jamie Whitten | D | MS-02 | November 4, 1941 | 8th term | |
| 86 | Thomas J. Lane | D | MA-07 | December 30, 1941 | 8th term | |
| 87 | Cecil R. King | D | CA-17 | August 25, 1942 | 8th term | |
| 88 | Thomas Abernethy | D | MS-01 | January 3, 1943 | 7th term | |
| 89 | James C. Auchincloss | R | NJ-03 | January 3, 1943 | 7th term | |
| 90 | William L. Dawson | D | IL-01 | January 3, 1943 | 7th term | |
| 91 | Harris Ellsworth | R | OR-04 | January 3, 1943 | 7th term | |
| 92 | Michael A. Feighan | D | OH-20 | January 3, 1943 | 7th term | |
| 93 | Antonio M. Fernández | D | NM | January 3, 1943 | 7th term | Died on November 7, 1956. |
| 94 | O. C. Fisher | D | TX-21 | January 3, 1943 | 7th term | |
| 95 | Leon H. Gavin | R | PA-23 | January 3, 1943 | 7th term | |
| 96 | Thomas S. Gordon | D | IL-08 | January 3, 1943 | 7th term | |
| 97 | Robert Hale | R | ME-01 | January 3, 1943 | 7th term | |
| 98 | Brooks Hays | D | AR-05 | January 3, 1943 | 7th term | |
| 99 | Charles B. Hoeven | R | IA-08 | January 3, 1943 | 7th term | |
| 100 | Hal Holmes | R | WA-04 | January 3, 1943 | 7th term | |
| 101 | Walt Horan | R | WA-05 | January 3, 1943 | 7th term | |
| 102 | Chester E. Holifield | D | CA-19 | January 3, 1943 | 7th term | |
| 103 | Justin L. Johnson | R | CA-11 | January 3, 1943 | 7th term | Left the House in 1957. |
| 104 | Walter Judd | R | MN-05 | January 3, 1943 | 7th term | |
| 105 | Bernard W. Kearney | R | NY-32 | January 3, 1943 | 7th term | |
| 106 | Ray Madden | D | IN-01 | January 3, 1943 | 7th term | |
| 107 | Chester Earl Merrow | R | NH-01 | January 3, 1943 | 7th term | |
| 108 | Arthur L. Miller | R | NE-04 | January 3, 1943 | 7th term | |
| 109 | James H. Morrison | D | LA-06 | January 3, 1943 | 7th term | |
| 110 | Tom J. Murray | D | TN-07 | January 3, 1943 | 7th term | |
| 111 | Thomas J. O'Brien | D | IL-06 | January 3, 1943; Previous service, 1933–1939. | 10th term* | |
| 112 | Alvin O'Konski | R | WI-10 | January 3, 1943 | 7th term | |
| 113 | Philip J. Philbin | D | MA-03 | January 3, 1943 | 7th term | |
| 114 | John J. Phillips | R | CA-29 | January 3, 1943 | 7th term | Left the House in 1957. |
| 115 | Sid Simpson | R | IL-20 | January 3, 1943 | 7th term | |
| 116 | Dean P. Taylor | R | NY-31 | January 3, 1943 | 7th term | |
| 117 | Charles W. Vursell | R | IL-23 | January 3, 1943 | 7th term | |
| 118 | W. Arthur Winstead | D | MS-05 | January 3, 1943 | 7th term | |
| 119 | Clair Engle | D | CA-02 | August 31, 1943 | 7th term | |
| 120 | Errett P. Scrivner | R | KS-02 | September 14, 1943 | 7th term | |
| 121 | Samuel K. McConnell Jr. | R | PA-13 | January 18, 1944 | 7th term | |
| 122 | George W. Andrews | D | AL-03 | March 14, 1944 | 7th term | |
| 123 | John J. Rooney | D | NY-14 | June 6, 1944 | 7th term | |
| 124 | John W. Byrnes | R | WI-08 | January 3, 1945 | 6th term | |
| 125 | Frank Chelf | D | KY-04 | January 3, 1945 | 6th term | |
| 126 | Robert J. Corbett | R | PA-29 | January 3, 1945; Previous service, 1939–1941. | 7th term* | |
| 127 | James I. Dolliver | R | IA-06 | January 3, 1945 | 6th term | Left the House in 1957. |
| 128 | George Hyde Fallon | D | MD-04 | January 3, 1945 | 6th term | |
| 129 | James G. Fulton | R | PA-27 | January 3, 1945 | 6th term | |
| 130 | Ralph W. Gwinn | R | NY-27 | January 3, 1945 | 6th term | |
| 131 | T. Millet Hand | R | NJ-02 | January 3, 1945 | 6th term | Died on December 26, 1956. |
| 132 | John W. Heselton | R | MA-01 | January 3, 1945 | 6th term | |
| 133 | Henry J. Latham | R | NY-04 | January 3, 1945 | 6th term | |
| 134 | Gordon L. McDonough | R | CA-15 | January 3, 1945 | 6th term | |
| 135 | George Paul Miller | D | CA-08 | January 3, 1945 | 6th term | |
| 136 | Thomas E. Morgan | D | PA-26 | January 3, 1945 | 6th term | |
| 137 | Adam Clayton Powell Jr. | D | NY-16 | January 3, 1945 | 6th term | |
| 138 | Charles Melvin Price | D | IL-24 | January 3, 1945 | 6th term | |
| 139 | Albert Rains | D | AL-05 | January 3, 1945 | 6th term | |
| 140 | Robert L. F. Sikes | D | FL-03 | January 3, 1945; Previous service, 1941–1944. | 8th term* | |
| 141 | James William Trimble | D | AR-03 | January 3, 1945 | 6th term | |
| 142 | John E. Fogarty | D | RI-02 | February 7, 1945; Previous service, 1941–1944. | 8th term* | |
| 143 | J. Vaughan Gary | D | VA-03 | March 6, 1945 | 6th term | |
| 144 | A. Walter Norblad | R | OR-01 | January 18, 1946 | 6th term | |
| 145 | Arthur G. Klein | D | NY-19 | February 19, 1946; Previous service, 1941–1945. | 8th term* | Resigned on December 31, 1956. |
| 146 | Olin E. Teague | D | TX-06 | August 24, 1946 | 6th term | |
| 147 | Burr Harrison | D | VA-07 | November 5, 1946 | 6th term | |
| 148 | Carl Albert | D | OK-03 | January 3, 1947 | 5th term | |
| 149 | John J. Allen Jr. | R | CA-07 | January 3, 1947 | 5th term | |
| 150 | John B. Bennett | R | MI-12 | January 3, 1947; Previous service, 1943–1945. | 6th term* | |
| 151 | John Blatnik | D | MN-08 | January 3, 1947 | 5th term | |
| 152 | Hale Boggs | D | LA-02 | January 3, 1947; Previous service, 1941–1943. | 6th term* | |
| 153 | Omar Burleson | D | TX-17 | January 3, 1947 | 5th term | |
| 154 | Frederic René Coudert Jr. | R | NY-17 | January 3, 1947 | 5th term | |
| 155 | Paul B. Dague | R | PA-09 | January 3, 1947 | 5th term | |
| 156 | James C. Davis | D | GA-05 | January 3, 1947 | 5th term | |
| 157 | Charles B. Deane | D | NC-08 | January 3, 1947 | 5th term | Left the House in 1957. |
| 158 | Harold Donohue | D | MA-04 | January 3, 1947 | 5th term | |
| 159 | Joe L. Evins | D | TN-04 | January 3, 1947 | 5th term | |
| 160 | Katharine St. George | R | NY-28 | January 3, 1947 | 5th term | |
| 161 | Porter Hardy Jr. | D | VA-02 | January 3, 1947 | 5th term | |
| 162 | Donald L. Jackson | R | CA-16 | January 3, 1947 | 5th term | |
| 163 | Frank M. Karsten | D | MO-01 | January 3, 1947 | 5th term | |
| 164 | Carroll D. Kearns | R | PA-24 | January 3, 1947 | 5th term | |
| 165 | Kenneth Keating | R | NY-38 | January 3, 1947 | 5th term | |
| 166 | Henderson Lovelace Lanham | D | GA-07 | January 3, 1947 | 5th term | |
| 167 | Edward Tylor Miller | R | MD-01 | January 3, 1947 | 5th term | |
| 168 | R. Walter Riehlman | R | NY-35 | January 3, 1947 | 5th term | |
| 169 | Otto Passman | D | LA-05 | January 3, 1947 | 5th term | |
| 170 | James T. Patterson | R | CT-05 | January 3, 1947 | 5th term | |
| 171 | Prince Preston | D | GA-01 | January 3, 1947 | 5th term | |
| 172 | Antoni Sadlak | R | CT-06 | January 3, 1947 | 5th term | |
| 173 | Hugh Scott | R | PA-06 | January 3, 1947; Previous service, 1941–1945. | 7th term* | |
| 174 | Wint Smith | R | KS-06 | January 3, 1947 | 5th term | |
| 175 | Thor C. Tollefson | R | WA-06 | January 3, 1947 | 5th term | |
| 176 | John Bell Williams | D | MS-04 | January 3, 1947 | 5th term | |
| 177 | James E. Van Zandt | R | PA-20 | January 3, 1947; Previous service, 1939–1943. | 8th term* | |
| 178 | Robert E. Jones Jr. | D | AL-08 | January 28, 1947 | 5th term | |
| 179 | Glenn Robert Davis | R | WI-02 | April 22, 1947 | 5th term | Left the House in 1957. |
| 180 | Russell V. Mack | R | WA-03 | July 7, 1947 | 5th term | |
| 181 | Edward Garmatz | D | MD-03 | July 15, 1947 | 5th term | |
| 182 | Clark W. Thompson | D | TX-09 | August 23, 1947; Previous service, 1933–1935. | 6th term* | |
| 183 | Ralph Harvey | R | IN-10 | November 4, 1947 | 5th term | |
| 184 | William Moore McCulloch | R | OH-04 | November 4, 1947 | 5th term | |
| 185 | Abraham J. Multer | D | NY-13 | November 4, 1947 | 5th term | |
| 186 | Donald W. Nicholson | R | MA-09 | November 18, 1947 | 5th term | |
| 187 | Watkins Moorman Abbitt | D | VA-04 | February 17, 1948 | 5th term | |
| 188 | Paul C. Jones | D | MO-10 | November 2, 1948 | 5th term | |
| 189 | Hugh Joseph Addonizio | D | NJ-11 | January 3, 1949 | 4th term | |
| 190 | Wayne N. Aspinall | D | CO-04 | January 3, 1949 | 4th term | |
| 191 | Cleveland M. Bailey | D | WV-03 | January 3, 1949; Previous service, 1945–1947. | 5th term* | |
| 192 | William A. Barrett | D | PA-01 | January 3, 1949; Previous service, 1945–1947. | 5th term* | |
| 193 | Charles Edward Bennett | D | FL-02 | January 3, 1949 | 4th term | |
| 194 | Richard Walker Bolling | D | MO-05 | January 3, 1949 | 4th term | |
| 195 | Usher L. Burdick | R | ND | January 3, 1949; Previous service, 1935–1945. | 9th term* | |
| 196 | A. S. J. Carnahan | D | MO-08 | January 3, 1949; Previous service, 1945–1947. | 5th term* | |
| 197 | Frank E. Carlyle | D | NC-07 | January 3, 1949 | 4th term | Left the House in 1957. |
| 198 | Richard Thurmond Chatham | D | NC-05 | January 3, 1949 | 4th term | Left the House in 1957. |
| 199 | Earl Chudoff | D | PA-04 | January 3, 1949 | 4th term | |
| 200 | James J. Delaney | D | NY-07 | January 3, 1949; Previous service, 1945–1947. | 5th term* | |
| 201 | Isidore Dollinger | D | NY-23 | January 3, 1949 | 4th term | |
| 202 | Clyde Doyle | D | CA-23 | January 3, 1949; Previous service, 1945–1947. | 5th term* | |
| 203 | Carl Elliott | D | AL-07 | January 3, 1949 | 4th term | |
| 204 | Gerald Ford | R | MI-05 | January 3, 1949 | 4th term | |
| 205 | James B. Frazier Jr. | D | TN-03 | January 3, 1949 | 4th term | |
| 206 | William T. Granahan | D | PA-02 | January 3, 1949; Previous service, 1945–1947. | 5th term* | Died on May 25, 1956. |
| 207 | William J. Green Jr. | D | PA-05 | January 3, 1949; Previous service, 1945–1947. | 5th term* | |
| 208 | H. R. Gross | R | IA-03 | January 3, 1949 | 4th term | |
| 209 | Cecil M. Harden | R | IN-06 | January 3, 1949 | 4th term | |
| 210 | Wayne Hays | D | OH-18 | January 3, 1949 | 4th term | |
| 211 | Albert S. Herlong Jr. | D | FL-05 | January 3, 1949 | 4th term | |
| 212 | Richard W. Hoffman | R | IL-10 | January 3, 1949 | 4th term | Left the House in 1957. |
| 213 | Benjamin F. James | R | PA-07 | January 3, 1949 | 4th term | Left the House in 1957. |
| 214 | Harold Lovre | R | SD-01 | January 3, 1949 | 4th term | Left the House in 1957. |
| 215 | Peter F. Mack Jr. | D | IL-21 | January 3, 1949 | 4th term | |
| 216 | Fred Marshall | D | MN-06 | January 3, 1949 | 4th term | |
| 217 | Eugene McCarthy | D | MN-04 | January 3, 1949 | 4th term | Left the House in 1957. |
| 218 | Morgan M. Moulder | D | MO-11 | January 3, 1949 | 4th term | |
| 219 | Charles P. Nelson | R | ME-02 | January 3, 1949 | 4th term | Left the House in 1957. |
| 220 | Carl D. Perkins | D | KY-07 | January 3, 1949 | 4th term | |
| 221 | James G. Polk | D | OH-06 | January 3, 1949; Previous service, 1931–1941. | 9th term* | |
| 222 | Louis C. Rabaut | D | MI-14 | January 3, 1949; Previous service, 1935–1947. | 10th term* | |
| 223 | George M. Rhodes | D | PA-14 | January 3, 1949 | 4th term | |
| 224 | Peter W. Rodino | D | NJ-10 | January 3, 1949 | 4th term | |
| 225 | Hubert B. Scudder | R | CA-01 | January 3, 1949 | 4th term | |
| 226 | Harley Orrin Staggers | D | WV-02 | January 3, 1949 | 4th term | |
| 227 | Tom Steed | D | OK-04 | January 3, 1949 | 4th term | |
| 228 | Homer Thornberry | D | TX-10 | January 3, 1949 | 4th term | |
| 229 | Harold H. Velde | R | IL-18 | January 3, 1949 | 4th term | Left the House in 1957. |
| 230 | Victor Wickersham | D | OK-06 | January 3, 1949; Previous service, 1941–1947. | 7th term* | Left the House in 1957. |
| 231 | Roy Wier | D | MN-03 | January 3, 1949 | 4th term | |
| 232 | Edwin E. Willis | D | LA-03 | January 3, 1949 | 4th term | |
| 233 | Gardner R. Withrow | R | WI-03 | January 3, 1949; Previous service, 1931–1939. | 8th term* | |
| 234 | Sidney R. Yates | D | IL-09 | January 3, 1949 | 4th term | |
| 235 | Clement J. Zablocki | D | WI-04 | January 3, 1949 | 4th term | |
| 236 | John P. Saylor | R | PA-22 | September 13, 1949 | 4th term | |
| 237 | Edna F. Kelly | D | NY-10 | November 8, 1949 | 4th term | |
| 238 | John F. Shelley | D | CA-05 | November 8, 1949 | 4th term | |
| 239 | William B. Widnall | R | NJ-07 | February 6, 1950 | 4th term | |
| 240 | William H. Bates | R | MA-06 | February 14, 1950 | 4th term | |
| 241 | Edward J. Robeson Jr. | D | VA-01 | May 2, 1950 | 4th term | |
| 242 | Myron V. George | R | KS-03 | November 7, 1950 | 4th term | |
| 243 | Woodrow W. Jones | D | NC-11 | November 7, 1950 | 4th term | Left the House in 1957. |
| 244 | E. Ross Adair | R | IN-04 | January 3, 1951 | 3rd term | |
| 245 | William Hanes Ayres | R | OH-14 | January 3, 1951 | 3rd term | |
| 246 | Howard Baker Sr. | R | TN-02 | January 3, 1951 | 3rd term | |
| 247 | John V. Beamer | R | IN-05 | January 3, 1951 | 3rd term | |
| 248 | Page Belcher | R | OK-01 | January 3, 1951 | 3rd term | |
| 249 | Ellis Yarnal Berry | R | SD-02 | January 3, 1951 | 3rd term | |
| 250 | Jackson Edward Betts | R | OH-08 | January 3, 1951 | 3rd term | |
| 251 | Frank T. Bow | R | OH-16 | January 3, 1951 | 3rd term | |
| 252 | William G. Bray | R | IN-07 | January 3, 1951 | 3rd term | |
| 253 | Horace Seely-Brown Jr. | R | CT-02 | January 3, 1951; Previous service, 1947–1949. | 4th term* | |
| 254 | Charles B. Brownson | R | IN-11 | January 3, 1951 | 3rd term | |
| 255 | Hamer H. Budge | R | ID-02 | January 3, 1951 | 3rd term | |
| 256 | Alvin Bush | R | PA-17 | January 3, 1951 | 3rd term | |
| 257 | John Chenoweth | R | CO-03 | January 3, 1951; Previous service, 1941–1949. | 7th term* | |
| 258 | Marguerite S. Church | R | IL-13 | January 3, 1951 | 3rd term | |
| 259 | Shepard J. Crumpacker Jr. | R | IN-03 | January 3, 1951 | 3rd term | Left the House in 1957. |
| 260 | Thomas B. Curtis | R | MO-02 | January 3, 1951 | 3rd term | |
| 261 | John J. Dempsey | D | NM | January 3, 1951; Previous service, 1935–1941. | 6th term* | |
| 262 | James Devereux | R | MD-02 | January 3, 1951 | 3rd term | |
| 263 | James G. Donovan | D | NY-18 | January 3, 1951 | 3rd term | Left the House in 1957. |
| 264 | William Jennings Bryan Dorn | D | SC-03 | January 3, 1951; Previous service, 1947–1949. | 4th term* | |
| 265 | Sidney A. Fine | D | NY-22 | January 3, 1951 | 3rd term | Resigned on January 2, 1956. |
| 266 | Tic Forrester | D | GA-03 | January 3, 1951 | 3rd term | |
| 267 | William E. Hess | R | OH-02 | January 3, 1951; Previous service, 1929–1937 and 1939–1949. | 12th term** | |
| 268 | Patrick J. Hillings | R | CA-25 | January 3, 1951 | 3rd term | |
| 269 | John Jarman | D | OK-05 | January 3, 1951 | 3rd term | |
| 270 | John C. Kluczynski | D | IL-05 | January 3, 1951 | 3rd term | |
| 271 | John Lesinski Jr. | D | MI-16 | January 3, 1951 | 3rd term | |
| 272 | Thaddeus M. Machrowicz | D | MI-01 | January 3, 1951 | 3rd term | |
| 273 | William E. McVey | R | IL-04 | January 3, 1951 | 3rd term | |
| 274 | George Meader | R | MI-02 | January 3, 1951 | 3rd term | |
| 275 | William E. Miller | R | NY-40 | January 3, 1951 | 3rd term | |
| 276 | Albert P. Morano | R | CT-04 | January 3, 1951 | 3rd term | |
| 277 | Walter M. Mumma | R | PA-16 | January 3, 1951 | 3rd term | |
| 278 | Harold C. Ostertag | R | NY-39 | January 3, 1951 | 3rd term | |
| 279 | Winston L. Prouty | R | VT | January 3, 1951 | 3rd term | |
| 280 | Edmund P. Radwan | R | NY-41 | January 3, 1951 | 3rd term | |
| 281 | B. Carroll Reece | R | TN-01 | January 3, 1951; Previous service, 1921–1931 and 1933–1947. | 15th term** | |
| 282 | John J. Riley | D | SC-02 | January 3, 1951; Previous service, 1945–1949. | 5th term* | |
| 283 | Kenneth A. Roberts | D | AL-04 | January 3, 1951 | 3rd term | |
| 284 | Byron G. Rogers | D | CO-01 | January 3, 1951 | 3rd term | |
| 285 | Walter E. Rogers | D | TX-18 | January 3, 1951 | 3rd term | |
| 286 | Timothy P. Sheehan | R | IL-11 | January 3, 1951 | 3rd term | |
| 287 | Alfred Dennis Sieminski | D | NJ-13 | January 3, 1951 | 3rd term | |
| 288 | Frank E. Smith | D | MS-03 | January 3, 1951 | 3rd term | |
| 289 | William L. Springer | R | IL-22 | January 3, 1951 | 3rd term | |
| 290 | Ruth Thompson | R | MI-09 | January 3, 1951 | 3rd term | Left the House in 1957. |
| 291 | J. Ernest Wharton | R | NY-29 | January 3, 1951 | 3rd term | |
| 292 | William R. Williams | R | NY-34 | January 3, 1951 | 3rd term | |
| 293 | William Van Pelt | R | WI-06 | January 3, 1951 | 3rd term | |
| 294 | John C. Watts | D | KY-06 | April 4, 1951 | 3rd term | |
| 295 | Elizabeth Kee | D | WV-05 | July 17, 1951 | 3rd term | |
| 296 | Vera Buchanan | D | PA-30 | July 24, 1951 | 3rd term | Died on November 26, 1955. |
| 297 | Frank N. Ikard | D | TX-13 | September 8, 1951 | 3rd term | |
| 298 | Clifford McIntire | R | ME-03 | October 22, 1951 | 3rd term | |
| 299 | Joseph L. Carrigg | R | PA-10 | November 6, 1951 | 3rd term | |
| 300 | Karl C. King | R | PA-08 | November 6, 1951 | 3rd term | Left the House in 1957. |
| 301 | Frank C. Osmers Jr. | R | NJ-09 | November 6, 1951; Previous service, 1939–1943. | 5th term* | |
| 302 | Paul F. Schenck | R | OH-03 | November 6, 1951 | 3rd term | |
| 303 | Robert Dinsmore Harrison | R | NE-03 | December 4, 1951 | 3rd term | |
| 304 | Leo W. O'Brien | D | NY-30 | April 1, 1952 | 3rd term | |
| 305 | John Dowdy | D | TX-07 | September 23, 1952 | 3rd term | |
| 306 | Hugh Quincy Alexander | D | NC-09 | January 3, 1953 | 2nd term | |
| 307 | Frank J. Becker | R | NY-03 | January 3, 1953 | 2nd term | |
| 308 | Alvin Morell Bentley | R | MI-08 | January 3, 1953 | 2nd term | |
| 309 | Jack Brooks | D | TX-02 | January 3, 1953 | 2nd term | |
| 310 | Joel Broyhill | R | VA-10 | January 3, 1953 | 2nd term | |
| 311 | Edward Boland | D | MA-02 | January 3, 1953 | 2nd term | |
| 312 | Oliver P. Bolton | R | OH-11 | January 3, 1953 | 2nd term | Left the House in 1957. |
| 313 | Albert H. Bosch | R | NY-05 | January 3, 1953 | 2nd term | |
| 314 | Robert Byrd | D | WV-06 | January 3, 1953 | 2nd term | |
| 315 | James A. Byrne | D | PA-03 | January 3, 1953 | 2nd term | |
| 316 | Elford Albin Cederberg | R | MI-10 | January 3, 1953 | 2nd term | |
| 317 | Albert W. Cretella | R | CT-03 | January 3, 1953 | 2nd term | |
| 318 | Sam Coon | R | OR-02 | January 3, 1953 | 2nd term | Left the House in 1957. |
| 319 | Laurence Curtis | R | MA-10 | January 3, 1953 | 2nd term | |
| 320 | William A. Dawson | R | UT-02 | January 3, 1953; Previous service, 1947–1949. | 3rd term* | |
| 321 | Steven Derounian | R | NY-02 | January 3, 1953 | 2nd term | |
| 322 | Martin Dies Jr. | D | TX | January 3, 1953; Previous service, 1931–1945. | 9th term* | |
| 323 | Thomas J. Dodd | D | CT-01 | January 3, 1953 | 2nd term | Left the House in 1957. |
| 324 | Francis E. Dorn | R | NY-12 | January 3, 1953 | 2nd term | |
| 325 | Ed Edmondson | D | OK-02 | January 3, 1953 | 2nd term | |
| 326 | Paul A. Fino | R | NY-25 | January 3, 1953 | 2nd term | |
| 327 | Peter Frelinghuysen Jr. | R | NJ-05 | January 3, 1953 | 2nd term | |
| 328 | Samuel Friedel | D | MD-07 | January 3, 1953 | 2nd term | |
| 329 | Lawrence H. Fountain | D | NC-02 | January 3, 1953 | 2nd term | |
| 330 | Brady P. Gentry | D | TX-03 | January 3, 1953 | 2nd term | Left the House in 1957. |
| 331 | Charles S. Gubser | R | CA-10 | January 3, 1953 | 2nd term | |
| 332 | Harlan Hagen | D | CA-14 | January 3, 1953 | 2nd term | |
| 333 | James A. Haley | D | FL-07 | January 3, 1953 | 2nd term | |
| 334 | Edgar W. Hiestand | R | CA-21 | January 3, 1953 | 2nd term | |
| 335 | Joseph F. Holt | R | CA-22 | January 3, 1953 | 2nd term | |
| 336 | Lester Holtzman | D | NY-06 | January 3, 1953 | 2nd term | |
| 337 | Craig Hosmer | R | CA-18 | January 3, 1953 | 2nd term | |
| 338 | DeWitt Hyde | R | MD-06 | January 3, 1953 | 2nd term | |
| 339 | Charles R. Jonas | R | NC-10 | January 3, 1953 | 2nd term | |
| 340 | Victor A. Knox | R | MI-11 | January 3, 1953 | 2nd term | |
| 341 | Otto Krueger | R | ND | January 3, 1953 | 2nd term | |
| 342 | Melvin Laird | R | WI-07 | January 3, 1953 | 2nd term | |
| 343 | Phil Landrum | D | GA-09 | January 3, 1953 | 2nd term | |
| 344 | George S. Long | D | LA-08 | January 3, 1953 | 2nd term | |
| 345 | Donald H. Magnuson | D | WA | January 3, 1953 | 2nd term | |
| 346 | William S. Mailliard | R | CA-04 | January 3, 1953 | 2nd term | |
| 347 | Donald Ray Matthews | D | FL-08 | January 3, 1953 | 2nd term | |
| 348 | Lee Metcalf | D | MT-01 | January 3, 1953 | 2nd term | |
| 349 | Bob Mollohan | D | WV-01 | January 3, 1953 | 2nd term | Left the House in 1957. |
| 350 | John E. Moss | D | CA-03 | January 3, 1953 | 2nd term | |
| 351 | Barratt O'Hara | D | IL-02 | January 3, 1953; Previous service, 1949–1951. | 3rd term* | |
| 352 | Tip O'Neill | D | MA-11 | January 3, 1953 | 2nd term | |
| 353 | Thomas Pelly | R | WA-01 | January 3, 1953 | 2nd term | |
| 354 | Richard Harding Poff | R | VA-06 | January 3, 1953 | 2nd term | |
| 355 | Gracie Pfost | D | ID-01 | January 3, 1953 | 2nd term | |
| 356 | John R. Pillion | R | NY-42 | January 3, 1953 | 2nd term | |
| 357 | John H. Ray | R | NY-15 | January 3, 1953 | 2nd term | |
| 358 | John J. Rhodes | R | AZ-01 | January 3, 1953 | 2nd term | |
| 359 | John M. Robsion Jr. | R | KY-03 | January 3, 1953 | 2nd term | |
| 360 | Gordon H. Scherer | R | OH-01 | January 3, 1953 | 2nd term | |
| 361 | Armistead Selden | D | AL-06 | January 3, 1953 | 2nd term | |
| 362 | George A. Shuford | D | NC-12 | January 3, 1953 | 2nd term | |
| 363 | Leonor Sullivan | D | MO-03 | January 3, 1953 | 2nd term | |
| 364 | T. Ashton Thompson | D | LA-07 | January 3, 1953 | 2nd term | |
| 365 | James B. Utt | R | CA-28 | January 3, 1953 | 2nd term | |
| 366 | Stuyvesant Wainwright | R | NY-01 | January 3, 1953 | 2nd term | |
| 367 | Jack Westland | R | WA-02 | January 3, 1953 | 2nd term | |
| 368 | Bob Wilson | R | CA-30 | January 3, 1953 | 2nd term | |
| 369 | Clarence Clifton Young | R | NV | January 3, 1953 | 2nd term | Left the House in 1957. |
| 370 | J. Arthur Younger | R | CA-09 | January 3, 1953 | 2nd term | |
| 371 | J. L. Pilcher | D | GA-02 | February 4, 1953 | 2nd term | |
| 372 | William M. Tuck | D | VA-05 | April 14, 1953 | 2nd term | |
| 373 | Robert T. Ashmore | D | SC-04 | June 2, 1953 | 2nd term | |
| 374 | James Bowler | D | IL-07 | July 7, 1953 | 2nd term | |
| 375 | William Natcher | D | KY-02 | August 1, 1953 | 2nd term | |
| 376 | Lester Johnson | D | WI-09 | October 13, 1953 | 2nd term | |
| 377 | Harrison A. Williams | D | NJ-06 | November 3, 1953 | 2nd term | Left the House in 1957. |
| 378 | Glenard P. Lipscomb | R | CA-24 | November 10, 1953 | 2nd term | |
| 379 | John James Flynt Jr. | D | GA-04 | November 2, 1954 | 2nd term* | |
| 380 | Bruce Alger | R | TX-05 | January 3, 1955 | 1st term | |
| 381 | Victor Anfuso | D | NY-08 | January 3, 1955; Previous service, 1951–1953. | 2nd term* | |
| 382 | Thomas W. L. Ashley | D | OH-09 | January 3, 1955 | 1st term | |
| 383 | William H. Avery | R | KS-01 | January 3, 1955 | 1st term | |
| 384 | John F. Baldwin Jr. | R | CA-06 | January 3, 1955 | 1st term | |
| 385 | Perkins Bass | R | NH-02 | January 3, 1955 | 1st term | |
| 386 | Ross Bass | D | TN-06 | January 3, 1955 | 1st term | |
| 387 | Albert David Baumhart Jr. | R | OH-13 | January 3, 1955; Previous service, 1941–1942. | 2nd term* | |
| 388 | John J. Bell | D | TX-14 | January 3, 1955 | 1st term | Left the House in 1957. |
| 389 | Iris Faircloth Blitch | D | GA-08 | January 3, 1955 | 1st term | |
| 390 | Charles A. Boyle | D | IL-12 | January 3, 1955 | 1st term | |
| 391 | Maurice G. Burnside | D | WV-04 | January 3, 1955; Previous service, 1949–1953. | 3rd term* | Left the House in 1957. |
| 392 | Jackson B. Chase | R | NE-02 | January 3, 1955 | 1st term | Left the House in 1957. |
| 393 | George H. Christopher | D | MO-04 | January 3, 1955; Previous service, 1949–1951. | 2nd term* | |
| 394 | Frank M. Clark | D | PA-25 | January 3, 1955 | 1st term | |
| 395 | William C. Cramer | R | FL-01 | January 3, 1955 | 1st term | |
| 396 | Irwin D. Davidson | D | NY-20 | January 3, 1955 | 1st term | Resigned on December 31, 1956. |
| 397 | Winfield K. Denton | D | IN-08 | January 3, 1955; Previous service, 1949–1953. | 3rd term* | |
| 398 | Charles Diggs | D | MI-13 | January 3, 1955 | 1st term | |
| 399 | Henry Aldous Dixon | R | UT-01 | January 3, 1955 | 1st term | |
| 400 | Dante Fascell | D | FL-04 | January 3, 1955 | 1st term | |
| 401 | Orvin B. Fjare | R | MT-02 | January 3, 1955 | 1st term | Left the House in 1957. |
| 402 | Daniel J. Flood | D | PA-11 | January 3, 1955; Previous service, 1945–1947 and 1949–1953. | 4th term** | |
| 403 | Kenneth J. Gray | D | IL-25 | January 3, 1955 | 1st term | |
| 404 | Edith Green | D | OR-03 | January 3, 1955 | 1st term | |
| 405 | Martha Griffiths | D | MI-17 | January 3, 1955 | 1st term | |
| 406 | Donald Hayworth | D | MI-06 | January 3, 1955 | 1st term | Left the House in 1957. |
| 407 | John E. Henderson | R | OH-15 | January 3, 1955 | 1st term | |
| 408 | George Huddleston Jr. | D | AL-09 | January 3, 1955 | 1st term | |
| 409 | William Raleigh Hull Jr. | D | MO-06 | January 3, 1955 | 1st term | |
| 410 | W. Pat Jennings | D | VA-09 | January 3, 1955 | 1st term | |
| 411 | August E. Johansen | R | MI-03 | January 3, 1955 | 1st term | |
| 412 | Joe M. Kilgore | D | TX-15 | January 3, 1955 | 1st term | |
| 413 | Coya Knutson | D | MN-09 | January 3, 1955 | 1st term | |
| 414 | Richard Lankford | D | MD-05 | January 3, 1955 | 1st term | |
| 415 | Torbert Macdonald | D | MA-08 | January 3, 1955 | 1st term | |
| 416 | Harris B. McDowell Jr. | D | DE | January 3, 1955 | 1st term | Left the House in 1957. |
| 417 | William Edwin Minshall Jr. | R | OH-23 | January 3, 1955 | 1st term | |
| 418 | James C. Murray | D | IL-03 | January 3, 1955 | 1st term | Left the House in 1957. |
| 419 | James Quigley | D | PA-19 | January 3, 1955 | 1st term | Left the House in 1957. |
| 420 | Henry S. Reuss | D | WI-05 | January 3, 1955 | 1st term | |
| 421 | James Roosevelt | D | CA-26 | January 3, 1955 | 1st term | |
| 422 | J. T. Rutherford | D | TX-16 | January 3, 1955 | 1st term | |
| 423 | Fred Schwengel | R | IA-01 | January 3, 1955 | 1st term | |
| 424 | Eugene Siler | R | KY-08 | January 3, 1955 | 1st term | |
| 425 | Bernice F. Sisk | D | CA-12 | January 3, 1955 | 1st term | |
| 426 | Charles M. Teague | R | CA-13 | January 3, 1955 | 1st term | |
| 427 | Edwin Keith Thomson | R | WY | January 3, 1955 | 1st term | |
| 428 | Frank Thompson | D | NJ-04 | January 3, 1955 | 1st term | |
| 429 | T. James Tumulty | D | NJ-14 | January 3, 1955 | 1st term | Left the House in 1957. |
| 430 | Stewart Udall | D | AZ-02 | January 3, 1955 | 1st term | |
| 431 | Charles Vanik | D | OH-21 | January 3, 1955 | 1st term | |
| 432 | Phillip Hart Weaver | R | NE-01 | January 3, 1955 | 1st term | |
| 433 | Jim Wright | D | TX-12 | January 3, 1955 | 1st term | |
| 434 | Herbert Zelenko | D | NY-21 | January 3, 1955 | 1st term | |
| 435 | Paul Rogers | D | FL-06 | January 11, 1955 | 1st term | |
| | John Dingell | D | MI-15 | December 13, 1955 | 1st term | |
| | Elmer J. Holland | D | PA-30 | January 24, 1956; Previous service, 1942–1943. | 2nd term* | |
| | James C. Healey | D | NY-22 | February 7, 1956 | 1st term | |
| | Kathryn E. Granahan | D | PA-02 | November 6, 1956 | 1st term | |

== Delegates ==
| Rank | Delegate | Party | District | Seniority date (Previous service, if any) | No.# of term(s) | Notes |
|---|---|---|---|---|---|---|
| 1 | Bob Bartlett | D | AK | January 3, 1945 | 6th term | |
| 2 | Antonio Fernós-Isern | D | PR | September 11, 1946 | 6th term | |
| 3 | Mary Elizabeth Pruett Farrington | R | HI | August 4, 1954 | 2nd term | |

== See also ==
- 84th United States Congress
- List of United States congressional districts
- List of United States senators in the 84th Congress
