= 1931 Guamanian legislative election =

Parliamentary elections were held in Guam in March 1931.

== Background ==
In March 1931 Governor Willis W. Bradley dissolved the First Guam Congress, stating that it was "not functioning either as a representative body or in a manner to take full advantage of its responsibilities." He issued a proclamation that created a bicameral Congress with a 27-member House of Representatives and a 15-member House of Council. Members of the House of Representatives were to serve for two years and members of the House of Council for four.

== Aftermath ==
The Second Guam Congress met for the first time on 2 April 1931, with Bradley opening the meeting.
