= Edmund Root =

American US Navy officer and Naval Governor of Guam

Capt. Edmund Root
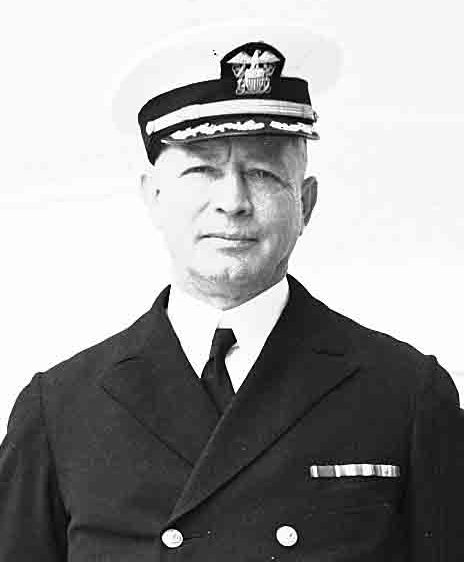
- Captain Edmund S. Root on deck of USS Astoria (August 1934)

34th Naval Governor of Guam
- In office May 15, 1931 – June 21, 1933
- Preceded by: Willis W. Bradley
- Succeeded by: George Andrew Alexander

Personal details
- Born: Edmund Spence Root; December 27, 1881 Delaware, Ohio
- Died: February 27, 1961 (aged 79) San Diego County, California
- Spouse: La Mira N. Root
- Education: United States Naval Academy
- Occupation: American US Navy officer and Naval Governor of Guam
- Awards: Letter of Commendation

Military service
- Allegiance: United States
- Branch/service: United States Navy
- Rank: Captain
- Commands: USS Rizal; USS Astoria; USS Rowan
- Battles/wars: World War I

Edmund Spence Root (December 27, 1881 – February 27, 1961) was a United States Navy Captain who served as the 34th Naval Governor of Guam. He graduated from the United States Naval Academy in 1905, serving on many ships as an ensign. He served as the inaugural commanding officer of two ships: USS Rizal and USS Astoria. He served during World War I as commander of the U-boat hunting USS Rowan, for which he received a letter of commendation. As governor, he generated controversy by expelling 112 Japanese laborers from Guam. The Guam Museum also opened during his term of office.

== Early life ==
On December 27, 1882, Root was born in Delaware, Ohio. Root's parents were George Root and Lori Spence.

== Career ==
=== Naval ===
Root was appointed to the United States Naval Academy from Ohio in 1901. He reported aboard USS Alabama in 1906, and 1908 he served aboard USS Maine as an ensign. On April 4, 1910, he began service aboard USS Bainbridge.

In 1913, he served aboard USS Glacier. During World War I, Root served within the Bureau of Navigation and then with the destroyer fleet stationed out of Queenstown, Ireland. In the war, he commanded USS Rowan, specifically seeking out and engaging German U-boats, for which he received a letter of commendation. On May 28, 1919, Root set sail aboard USS Rizal as her first commanding officer. In 1934, he served as the first commanding officer of USS Astoria. In the 1940s, he headed the naval officer procurement program in Chicago, where he oversaw the area's initial WAVES program.

=== Governorship ===
Root served as Naval Governor of Guam from May 15, 1931 to June 21, 1933. Root caused controversy between the United States and Japanese governments in 1933 when he expelled 112 Japanese citizens from Guam after their residence permits expired. The Guam Museum opened during his term. The Edmund S. Root Agricultural School in Guam is named in his honor.

== Personal life ==
On May 27, 1929 Root married La Mira D. Norton in Hempstead, New York. On February 27, 1961, Root died in San Diego, California.

Military offices
Preceded by Willis W. Bradley	Naval Governor of Guam; 1931–1933	Succeeded by George A. Alexander
