= George A. Alexander =

35th Governor of Guam

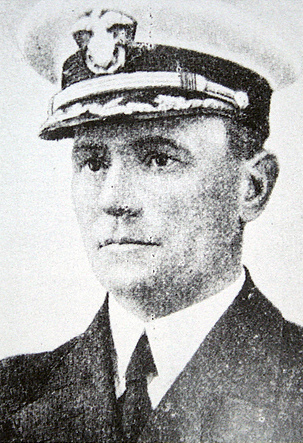
- George A. Alexander

35th Naval Governor of Guam
- In office June 21, 1933 – March 27, 1936
- Preceded by: Edmund Root
- Succeeded by: Benjamin McCandlish

Personal details
- Born: September 8, 1884
- Died: 1969 (aged 84–85)
- Education: United States Naval Academy

Military service
- Allegiance: United States
- Branch/service: United States Navy
- Rank: Captain
- Commands: USS Medusa; USS Arizona
- Battles/wars: World War I

George Andrew Alexander (8 September 1884–1969) was a United States Navy Captain who served as the 35th Naval Governor of Guam. Prior to serving as governor, he commanded USS Medusa. As Governor of Guam, he greatly changed the judicial system by purging the island of leftover Spanish laws and replacing them with the Code of Guam. He also led an unsuccessful campaign to obtain United States citizenship for all residents of Guam. After his term as governor, he commanded USS Arizona before retiring.

== Early life ==
Alexander grew up and lived most of his life in Ohio.

== Education ==
Alexander entered the United States Naval Academy from Ohio in 1902. He subsequently attended Naval War College.

== Career ==
In 1929, Alexander took command of the Naval Oceanographic Office in Seattle, Washington. Alexander left his command of USS Medusa to serve as Governor of Guam.

Following his post as governor, he commanded USS Arizona from June 8, 1936, until December 11, 1937. Though the government of Guam recommended him for promotion to rear admiral, he retired from the Navy as a captain.

=== Governorship ===
Alexander served as the governor from June 21, 1933, to March 27, 1936. He supported the local effort to obtain United States citizenship for all residents of Guam, sending a petition requesting the right and signed by 2,000 Guamanians to the President of the United States. He revolutionized the Guam legal system, replacing old Spanish-style laws with the Code of Guam, a set of laws based on the California Codes. Though the Guam Museum opened in 1933, Alexander officially made it a government institution by executive order.

== Personal life ==
Alexander was married. They had two daughters, Lois and Lauramae. Alexander and his family have lived in places including Long Beach, California, and Guam.

Alexander's daughter is Lauramae Alexander Sholars (Mrs. Stanifer Sholars).

In October 1970, Alexander died in Baton Rouge, Louisiana. Alexander is interred at Vine Street Hill Cemetery in Cincinnati, Ohio.

Military offices
Preceded by Edmund Root	Naval Governor of Guam; 1933–1936	Succeeded by Benjamin McCandlish
