= USS Rizal =

Wickes-class destroyer

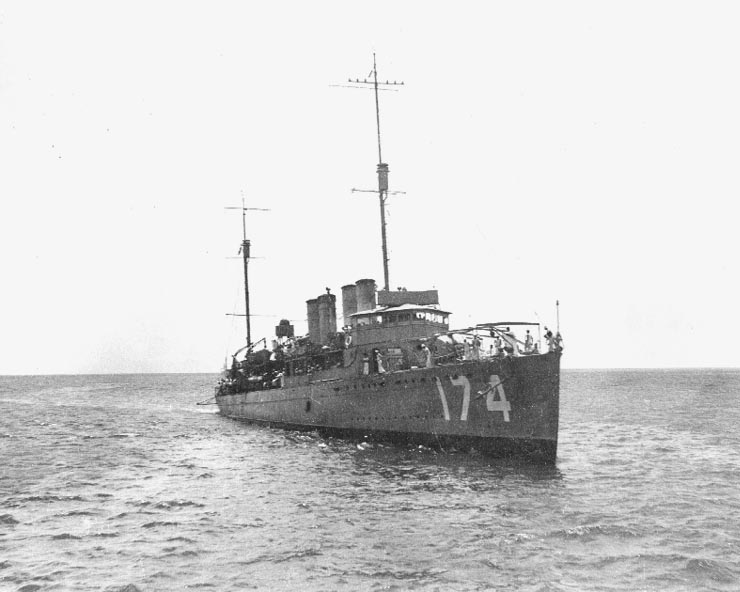
- USS Rizal in 1919–1920

History

United States
- Name: Rizal
- Namesake: José Rizal
- Builder: Union Iron Works, San Francisco, California
- Laid down: 26 June 1918
- Launched: 21 September 1918
- Commissioned: 28 May 1919
- Identification: DD-174
- Decommissioned: 20 August 1931
- Reclassified: DM-14, 17 July 1920
- Stricken: 11 November 1931
- Fate: Sold for scrapping, 25 February 1932

General characteristics
- Class & type: Wickes-class destroyer
- Displacement: 1,060 tons
- Length: 314 ft 5 in (95.8 m)
- Beam: 31 ft 8 in (9.7 m)
- Draft: 9 ft 10 in (3.0 m)
- Speed: 35 knots (65 km/h)
- Complement: 101 officers and enlisted
- Armament: 4 × single 4 in (102 mm) guns; 2 × single 3 in (76 mm) guns; 4 × triple 21 in (533 mm) torpedo tubes; 2 × depth charge tracks

USS Rizal (DD–174) was a Wickes-class destroyer in the United States Navy following World War I. She was named for José Rizal, a Filipino patriot, and the national hero of the Philippines.

== History ==
To support its efforts in World War I, Rizal was donated to the United States by the Philippine Legislature of the American-colonial Insular Government of the Philippines. The destroyer was laid down on 26 June 1918 by Union Iron Works, San Francisco, California and launched on 21 September 1918, sponsored by Sofia de Veyra, both before the end of World War I. However, the vessel was commissioned on 28 May 1919, with Commander Edmund Root at the helm, after the end of the war the previous November.

Joining the Pacific Fleet upon commissioning, Rizal cruised along the United States west coast into 1920 on exercises and training duty. Subsequently modified for service as a light minelayer, she was classified DM-14 on 17 July 1920. Rizal departed San Diego on 25 March 1920 for the Far East. Calling at Honolulu, Midway, and Guam, Rizal arrived in Cavite on 1 May 1920 to assume the duties of flagship of the Mine Detachment Division of the Asiatic Fleet. With Filipinos constituting the majority of her crew, Rizal remained on the Asiatic Station for ten years. She spent long months anchored in Chinese ports during the spring, summer, and autumn months. Her most frequent ports of call were Shanghai, Yantai, Qinhuangdao, and Hong Kong. Rizal cruised eastward to Apra Harbor, Guam, during November 1928, and visited Yokohama, Japan, from 11 to 20 April 1929.

Rizal spent each winter generally from November through March, anchored in Manila Bay. She was docked annually at Olongapo and upon resuming active service each spring operated in Philippine waters. Ordered home late in 1930, Rizal departed Manila on 11 December 1930 for Guam, Honolulu, and San Diego. She decommissioned on 20 August 1931 at San Diego and was towed northward to Mare Island on 31 August 1931 by the minesweeper USS Tern to be placed in reserve. Struck from the Navy list on 11 November 1931, Rizal was dismantled and her materials were sold 25 February 1932 for scrapping in accordance with the provisions of the London Naval Treaty for the reduction and limitation of naval armament.

No other ship in the United States Navy has borne this name.
