= George A. Paddock =

American politician (1885-1964)

George A, Paddock
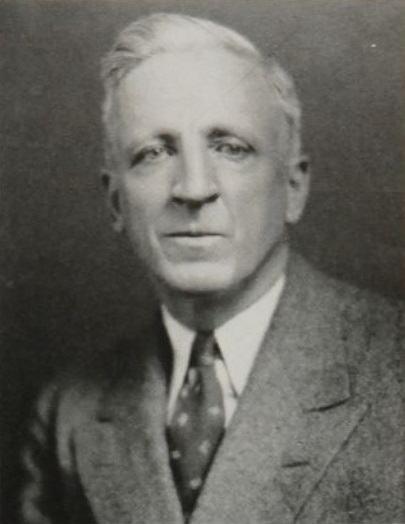
- From August 1942's The Rainbow of Delta Tau Delta

Member of the U.S. House of Representatives from Illinois's 10th district
- In office January 3, 1941 – January 3, 1943
- Preceded by: Ralph E. Church
- Succeeded by: Ralph E. Church

Personal details
- Born: March 24, 1885 Winnetka, Illinois
- Died: December 29, 1964 (aged 79) Evanston, Illinois
- Party: Republican

Military service
- Allegiance: United States
- Branch/service: United States Army
- Years of service: 1917–1919

George Arthur Paddock (March 24, 1885 – December 29, 1964) was a U.S. representative from Illinois.

Born in Winnetka, Illinois, Paddock attended the public schools. He was graduated from Chicago (Illinois) Manual Training School in 1902 and from the University of Virginia at Charlottesville in 1906. He studied law at the University of Virginia. He was admitted to the bar in 1907 and commenced practice in Chicago, Illinois.

During the First World War served as a captain and was promoted to major in the 342nd Infantry, 86th Division from 1917 to 1919.

After the war, he resumed the practice of law at Chicago, Illinois and engaged as an investment banker in 1921.

He served as an alderman in Evanston, Illinois from 1931 to 1937 and as park commissioner 1929–1931, 1937, and 1938. He served as delegate to the Republican State convention in 1936 and also as member and treasurer of Cook County Republican Central Committee from 1938 to 1942.

He also served as member of the Soldiers' and Sailors' Service Commission of Illinois.

Paddock was elected as a Republican to the Seventy-seventh Congress (January 3, 1941 – January 3, 1943). He was an unsuccessful candidate for renomination in 1942 and resumed investment banking.

He was an hereditary companion of the Military Order of the Loyal Legion of the United States.

He was a resident of Evanston, Illinois, until his death December 29, 1964. He was interred in Rosehill Cemetery in Chicago.

U.S. House of Representatives
Preceded by Ralph E. Church	Member of the U.S. House of Representatives from Illinois's 10th congressional district 1941–1943	Succeeded by Ralph E. Church
