= USS Bradley =

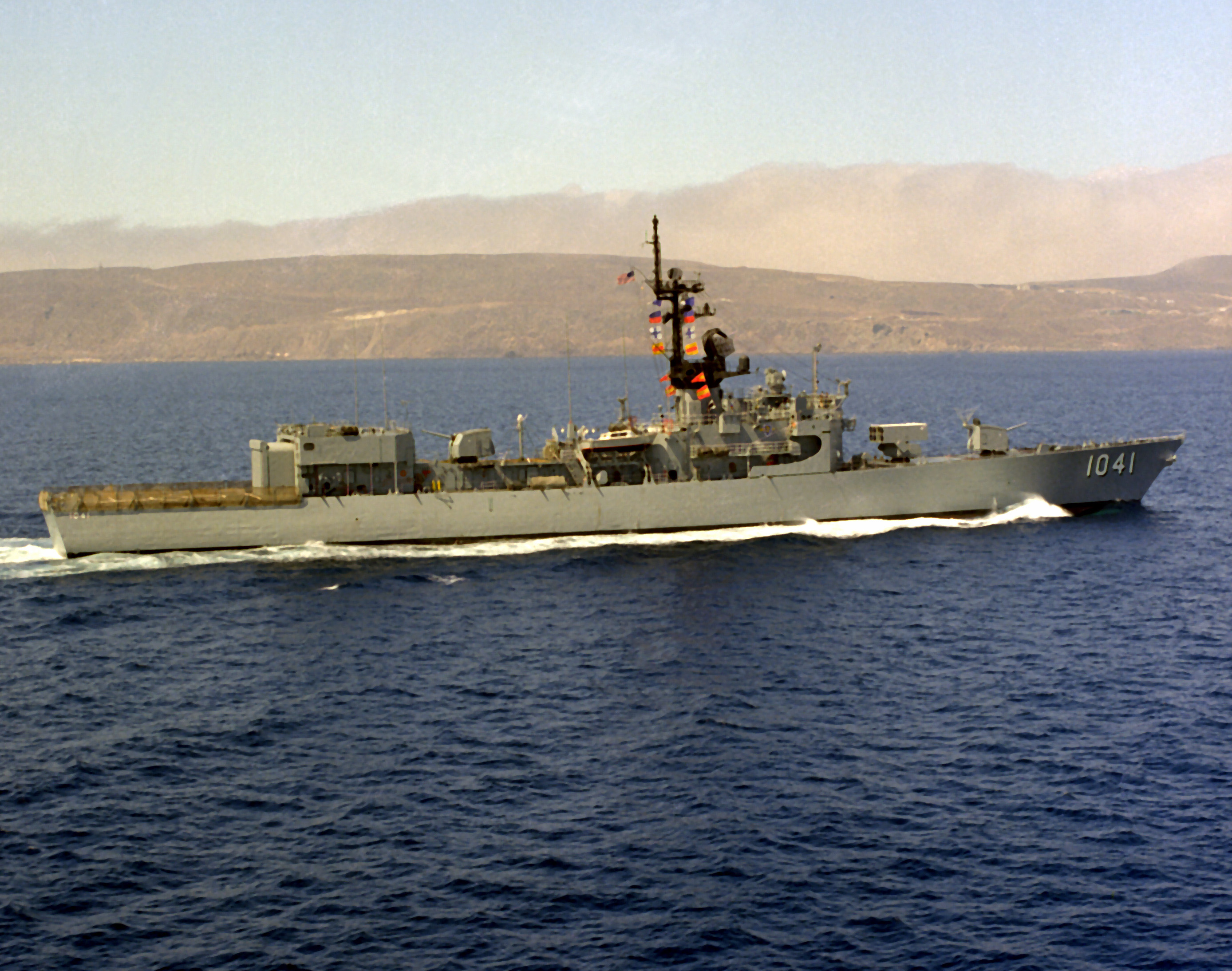
- Bradley underway on 8 July 1976

History

United States
- Name: Bradley
- Laid down: 17 January 1963
- Launched: 26 March 1964
- Sponsored by: Sue Worthington Bradley
- Commissioned: 15 May 1965
- Decommissioned: 30 September 1988
- Identification: FF-1041
- Fate: Transferred to Brazil

Brazil
- Name: Pernambuco
- Namesake: Pernambuco
- Commissioned: 25 September 1989
- Decommissioned: 11 March 2004
- Identification: D 30
- Fate: Scrapped

General characteristics
- Class & type: Garcia-class frigate
- Displacement: 2,624 tons (light)
- Length: 414 ft 6 in (126.34 m)
- Beam: 44 ft 1 in (13.44 m)
- Draft: 24 ft 6 in (7.47 m)
- Propulsion: 2 Foster Wheeler boilers, 1 Westinghouse turbine, 35,000 shp (26,000 kW), single screw
- Speed: 27 knots (50 km/h; 31 mph)
- Range: 4,000 nmi (7,400 km; 4,600 mi) at 20 kn (37 km/h; 23 mph)
- Complement: 16 officers; 231 enlisted
- Sensors & processing systems: AN/SPS-40 air search radar; AN/SPS-10 surface search radar; AN/SQS-26 bow mounted sonar
- Armament: 2 × single 5 in (127 mm)/38 cal. Mk 30 guns; 1 × 8-tube RUR-5 ASROC Mk114 launcher (16 missiles); 2 × triple 12.75 in (324 mm) Mk 32 torpedo tubes, Mk 46 torpedoes; 2 × MK 37 torpedo tubes (fixed, stern) (removed later)
- Aircraft carried: Gyrodyne QH-50 (planned) / SH-2 LAMPS

USS Bradley (FF-1041) was the second of ten 2,620-ton Garcia-class destroyer escorts, later reclassified as frigates, in the United States Navy. She was named for Captain Willis Winter Bradley Jr. She was later sold into the Brazilian Navy as Pernambuco (D 30).

== As Bradley ==
Bradley was laid down at San Francisco, California on 17 January 1963, launched on 26 March 1964, sponsored by Sue Worthington Bradley, and commissioned on 15 May 1965.

Her first deployment to the Western Pacific between July and December 1966 included four months of gunfire support along the coast of South Vietnam and carrier escort duty in the Gulf of Tonkin. In February 1967 Bradley received the prototype destroyer installation of the Sea Sparrow Basic Point Defense Missile System (BPDMS). After intensive trials between May and September, the system was removed in September.

Bradley commenced her second deployment to Southeast Asia in December 1967 but was diverted to the Sea of Japan in response to the North Korean capture of USS Pueblo as part of Operation Formation Star. In March she resumed carrier escort and gunfire support duties off South Vietnam. After a final tour on the gun line in June, during which she fired 3,247 rounds in 10 days from her two 5-inch/38 guns, she returned to San Diego, California in July 1968. Her first regular overhaul between October 1968 and May 1969 featured a major upgrade to her AN/SQS 26AXR sonar and extensive work on her two temperamental pressure-fired boilers. Bradley's third deployment featured a gun line tour in January 1970, surveillance of the Soviet Navy's worldwide "Okean" exercise in April, and more carrier escort and gunfire support duty lasting into June. During the next five years Bradley conducted three additional deployments to Southeast Asia, interrupted by a second regular overhaul in 1971–72.

In June 1975 Bradley began a year-long overhaul which included the enlargement of her helicopter hangar. In July 1975 she was reclassified from escort ship (DE) to frigate (FF). After trials in mid-1976, Bradley conducted two more deployments, each of which included lengthy operations in the Indian Ocean, before entering the shipyard in mid-1979 for another one-year overhaul. Repeating this pattern, she conducted another two deployments, this time ranging between Korea and Malaysia, before starting another year-long overhaul in mid-1983, primarily to remedy boiler problems. The ship made one more Western Pacific deployment between mid-1986 and January 1987 and a Northern Pacific cruise in May–June 1988 before decommissioning on 30 September 1988.

== Brazilian service ==
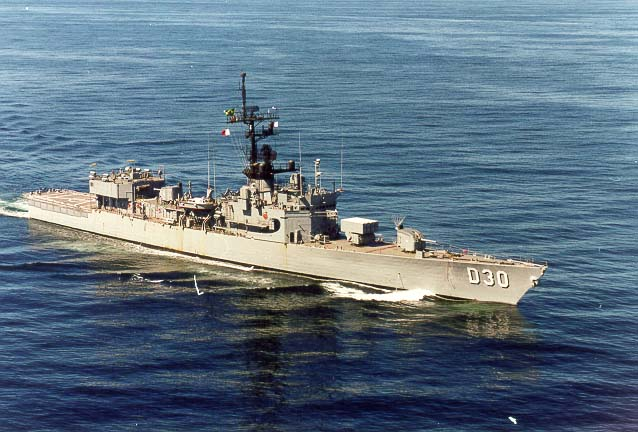
Pernambuco

In September 1989 Bradley was leased to Brazil at San Diego and became the destroyer Pernambuco (D 30). She was stricken from the U.S. Navy and sold outright to Brazil in January 2001. She remained active in the Brazilian Navy into her 39th year afloat, having participated at sea in seven exercises between early 2001 and early 2003. On 11 March 2004, she was decommissioned and placed in reserve.

== See also ==
- Sue Worthington Bradley (sponsor)
