= Sue Worthington Bradley =

American First Lady of Guam (1883–1970)

First Lady of Guam
- In role June 11, 1929 – March 15, 1931
- Governor: Willis W. Bradley

Personal details
- Born: December 25, 1883 Maryland, US
- Died: August 30, 1970 (aged 86) El Paso, Texas, US
- Spouse: Willis W. Bradley (m. 1907; died 1954)
- Children: 4
- Relatives: Bruce McCandless (son-in-law)
- Occupation: First Lady of Guam
- Other names: Sue Cox, Sue W. Bradley, Sue Bradley, Sue Worthington Cox Bradley, Susan Bradley

Sue Worthington Bradley (born Sue Worthington Cox; December 25, 1883 – August 30, 1970) was the American First Lady of Guam from 1929 to 1931. She was the wife of naval Governor of Guam Willis W. Bradley.

== Early life ==
On December 25, 1883, Bradley was born as Sue Worthington Cox in Baltimore, Maryland. Bradley's father was Henry Cox. Bradley's mother was Elizabeth Janney (nee Merrefield) Cox. Bradley's siblings include Rebecca, Lillian, Josephine and Douglas.

Bradley attended Edgeworth School, a day and boarding school in Baltimore.

== Career ==
In 1929, when Willis W. Bradley was appointed the military Governor of Guam, Bradley became the First Lady of Guam on June 11, 1929, until March 15, 1931.

Bradley became the President of Officers' Wives Club.

On March 26, 1964, Bradley sponsored the launching of USS Bradley at Bethlehem Steel Co in San Francisco, California. The USS Bradley was named for Bradley's husband, Captain Willis Winter Bradley, Jr.

== Personal life ==
On October 16, 1907, in Baltimore, Maryland, Bradley married Willis W. Bradley, Jr., who later became a US Navy officer and Military Governor of Guam. They had four daughters, Elizabeth, Sue, Anne, and Josephine. Bradley and her family lived in places including Long Beach, California and Guam.

In Guam, Bradley and her family lived in the ancient Spanish Governor's Palace.

On August 30, 1970, Bradley died in El Paso, Texas.
