= Postage stamps and postal history of Guam =

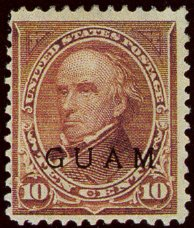
1899 issue 10c brown overprinted GUAM depicting United States Secretary of State Daniel Webster

The postage stamps and postal history of Guam is an overview of the postage stamps and postal history of the United States territory of Guam. Its postal service is linked to those of the Philippines during the Spanish Empire and, since 1898, to the United States of America. A peculiarity is that, for a short period in the 1930s, Guam had a local post service.

Because the US Postal administration issued the same stamps in Guam as in the United States, cancellations are the only way to identify a stamp as having been used in the island. Between the 1930s and 1970s, during the creation of trans-Pacific airways, stops at Guam were commemorated with special illustrated marks.

== Spanish colonization ==
During the Spanish Empire, Guam was considered part of the Mariana Islands that were claimed by Spain since the 16th century. Between 1876 and 1882 stamps used are those of the Philippines illustrating a portrait of King Alfonso XII, the Spanish coat of arms (1881–1888) and, after 1890, the child profile of Alfonso XIII.

Following the victory of the United States in the war of 1898, in December 1898 Spain agreed by the treaty of Paris to sell the island of Guam, while the other Mariana islands became part of the German Empire. US troops had been present since an invasion the previous June.

== Territory of the United States ==
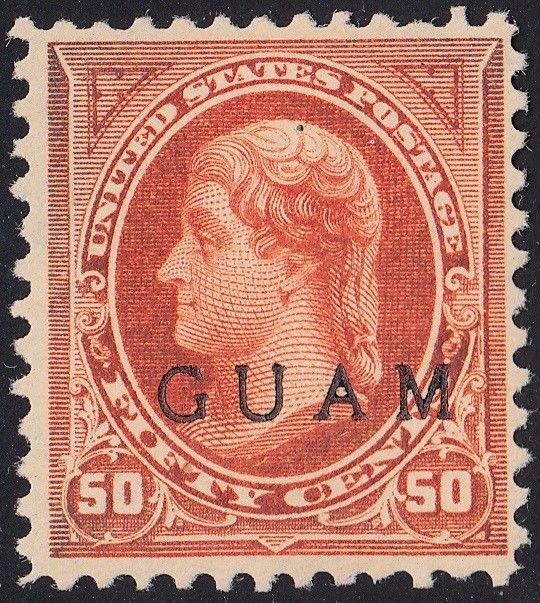
1899 United States 50 cent postage stamp overprinted "GUAM"

In 1899, when it began to administer the island, the US Navy issued eleven postage stamps overprinted "GUAM". These were from the definitive series illustrating with portraits of US presidents or major personalities. This series was first issued between 1890 and 1894. The denominations and colors used for Guam are from 1895 and 1898–1899 issues.

Denomination and color	Portrait
Stamps from the 1895 series
2-cent carmin	George Washington
3-cent violet	Andrew Jackson
8-cent brown-violet	William Sherman
50-cent red-orange	Thomas Jefferson
1 dollar black	Oliver Hazard Perry
Stamps from the 1898–1899 series
1-cent green	Benjamin Franklin
4-cent brown-red	Abraham Lincoln
5-cent blue	Ulysses Grant
6-cent brown-carmin	James Garfield
10-cent brown	Daniel Webster
15-cent green-olive	Henry Clay

When the United States Post Office Department (USPOD) took charge of the postal service of Guam in March 1901, the local population, soldiers from the US Navy base and indigenous Chamorros, had to use US stamps without any distinctive marks. Since 1901, only a Guam town cancellation indicates domestic posting. This situation is common to others insular unincorporated territories of the United States, such as, Northern Mariana Islands since 1944, Virgin Islands since 1917, Puerto Rico since 1900 and American Samoa since 1899. The existence of a local post at the beginning of the 1930s and the Japan occupation periods were exceptions.

Since its annexation, Guam was the subject of one postage stamp produced by the United States Postal Service. On June 1, 2007, a 90-cent stamp, part of the airmail series "Scenic American Landscapes" depicting a sunset on a beach and the Hagåtña Bay was released.

The island's name was included on the central label of the 50th Anniversary of the World War II miniature sheets of ten stamps each, issued between 1991 and 1995.

=== Guam Guard Mail ===
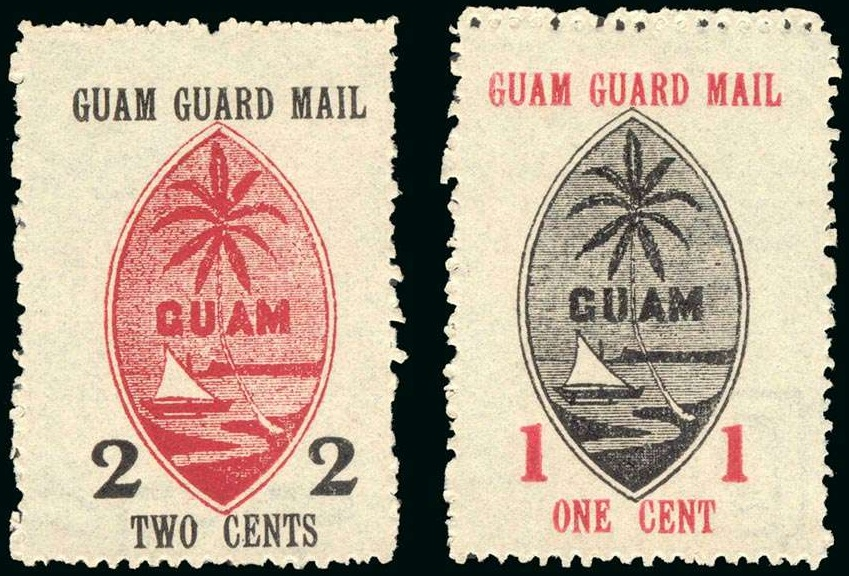
1-cent and 2-cent Guam Guard Mail stamps showing Guam coat-of-arms

Until the 1930s, the USPOD office in Guam did not deliver mail to addressee's home or businesses. To accomplish this, the military governor, Commander Willis Winter Bradley Jr., created a local post service on April 8, 1930.

Bordallo's Taxi was used to regularly carry the mail. The 15 miles run from Agana to Agat with stops in Asan, Piti, and Sumay, was made twice a day, six times a week. The arrangements with Bordallo originally was on a gratis basis, but as the amount of mail increased, he was paid $5.00 per month. The service was completely equipped with bags, mail boxes, canceling stamps, and signs with Bordallo's bus line as carriers for the mail.

Commissioners of the various villages served were given the duty of providing local postal service. Often these commissioners did not live in their village and so had to delegate authority to others to handle the mail. No specific records exists of the names of those persons who first handled the mails, but the following, listed in the "Guam Recorder" of January 1930 were the commissioners who can logically be called the first Guam Guard Mail Postmasters in their several villages:

Agana: Chief Commissioner of Guam Island Antonio C. Suarez
Agat: Tomas C. Charfauros
Asan: Santiago A. Limitiaco
Inarajan: Enrique P. Naputi
Merizo: Juan E. Lujan
Piti: Joaquin Torres
Sumay: Joaquin C. Diaz

On August 29, 1930, the Guam Guard Mail service was extended to the southern part of the island with stations at Merizo and Inarajan. This route also included Umatac. The route was by bus from Agana to Piti and then to Merizo via the semi-weekly boat service (this was necessary since a bridge had not been completed on the road to Merizo). Then from Merizo to Inarajan by Island Government truck.

Stamps were issued to mark the payment of this service. On April 8, 1930, two stamps of the Philippines were issued with the overprint in black GUAM / GUARD / MAIL : they are the 2 centavos green "José Rizal" and 4 centavos red picturing president William McKinley. 2,000 of the 2-centavos and 3,000 of the 4-centavos were issued in sheets of 100.

On July 10, 1930, two stamps were issued depicting the Guam coat of arms. These 1-cent and 2-cents are bi-color black and red, perforated 11 and without gum. 1,000 of 1 cent and 4,000 of the 2 cent were issued is sheets of 25. These two stamps were printed locally on Guam since the first issue had run out and the new supply of stamps had not arrived from the Philippines.

On August 21, 1930, the 2-centavos and 4-centavos issued with the overprint in black GUAM / GUARD / MAIL, but using a different font from the first issue. This was necessary since not enough of the older typeset was available to overprint the greater number of stamps. 20,000 of the 2-centavo and 80,000 4-centavo were issued in sheet of 100 with the right handed selvage removed for most right handed sheets.

On December 29, 1930, Philippines stamps were issued with the overprint « GUAM / GUARD / MAIL » in red using the same font as the 3rd issue. The 2-centavos and 4-centavos were used again and also a 6-centavos violet « Magellan », 8-centavos brown « López de Legazpi » and 10-centavos blue « Henry Ware Lawton ». 50,000 of the 2 and 4-centavos and 25,000 of the 6, 8, and 10-centavos were issued in sheets of 100. Again the right handed selvage removed for all right handed sheets. The bottom salvage was removed from 10-centavos stamps leaving only top plate numbers on these sheets.

This local service ceased operation in the northern half of the island on January 1, 1931, and on the southern half on April 8, 1931, when the US postal administration took over all mail delivery on the island. After that date they were served by the U.S. Post Office Department's Star Route 81102.

The Guam Guard Mail was restarted on April 8, 1976, and regularly continued to issue stamps and stationery, whose use is limited to mail between their posts and offices, or for Christmas and New Year wishes of the Guam Guard families. The stamps have been illustrated with Guam topics: the coat of arms, US Navy ships that halted to the island, first trans-Pacific planes, and the portrait of Kimberley Santos, Miss World 1980. It was discontinued on December 31, 1981.

== Japanese occupation ==
Right after the attack on Pearl Harbor Japanese forces conquered Guam on December 10, 1941. The Japanese administration used the same stamps as those issued for the occupied Philippines. At first the former US administration stamps were overprinted with messages commemorating the Japanese victories in the Pacific, then new stamps, with an evolution in the legend: in English in 1942 ("PHILIPPINES"), then Japanese in 1943, and finally in Filipino ("REPUBLIKA NG PILIPINAS") were released.

As previously, only the cancellation proves a Guam use.

The island was recaptured after the Battle of Guam, between the July 21 and August 10, 1944, and US stamps were once again reintroduced.

== Specialised collections ==
=== Aerophilately and astrophilately ===
October 1935 marked the new status of Guam as Pan American Airways stop. The goal of PanAm was to create new trans-Pacific airways between Northern America and Asia. Until the 1970s, the openings of new lines furnished an aerophilatelic collection.

From the beginning, with the first test flight arrived in Guam in October 1935 from San Francisco, following stops in Honolulu and Midway, mail was brought by the crew, illustrated with commemorative marks in Guam. Before and after World War II each new first-flight to new destinations received commemorative marks in Guam, like any other stops and destinations.

Astrophilatelic collections of Guam also exists. In the 1960s and 1970s, the presence of a NASA tracking station produced special covers when a US space launch took place.

=== Maritime marcophily ===
Paquebot cancellations appear on mail posted aboard ship that was delivered to the Guam postal service. The presence of the US Navy base means that Guam cancellations can appear on soldiers' mail. Since the late 20th century, Japanese tourists in particular have been attracted to Guam by the climate and landscape arriving by planes and by liners. The latter passengers' mail will be cancelled in Guam if posted on board, even if it was franked with Japanese stamps.

== Synthese ==
This table summarises the main periods of philatelic history of Guam.

Period	Stamps used
?–1899	Philippines; Filipinas
1899–1901	United States overprinted « GUAM »
1901–1941	United States; US or United States
1941–1944	Japanese occupation of the Philippines
Since 1944	United States; US or United States
Local post
April 1930–April 1931	Philippines Islands; United States of America surcharges Guam Guard Mail
July 1930	Guam Guard Mail
April 1931: local service taken by US Post Office
Legend
italic type	mention on stamps

== See also ==
- History of Guam
- Postage stamps and postal history of the United States of America
- Postage to Guam

== References and sources ==
Stamp catalogs

- Michel. Nord-und Mittelamerika. Germany: Schwaneberger Verlag. 2000. pp. 931–934, 1053, 1059, 1063, 1068, 1077.
- Catalogue de timbres-poste, tome 3, Outre-mer, Yvert et Tellier, 1961, Amiens, France:
  - pages 522–523: US stamps 1890–1899,
  - pages 626–627: Guam, including the local post,
  - pages 1140–1141: Philippines stamps 1870s–1890s,
  - page 1142: Philippines stamps 1906–1914,
  - pages 1156–1158: Japanese occupation of the Philippines stamps 1942–1944.
- Articles « Guam » and « Mariannes », in Delafosse, Jacques (2004). Dictionnaire des émissions philatéliques. Timbropresse. pp. respectively pages 65 and 96. ISBN 2-908101-10-6.

Articles

- Miller, Rick. "U.S. collection going nowhere? Try possessions". Linn's Stamp News: 25 April 2005. Archived from the original on 23 April 2007. The Guam part told the story of the Guam Guard post.
- P.J.M. (July–August 2007). "Guam, île-clef de l'aérophilatélie trans-Pacifique". Timbres magazine. No. 81. pp. 68–73. After a postal history summary, the article told the story of Guam aerophilately.
