= Ralph E. Church =

American politician (1883–1950)

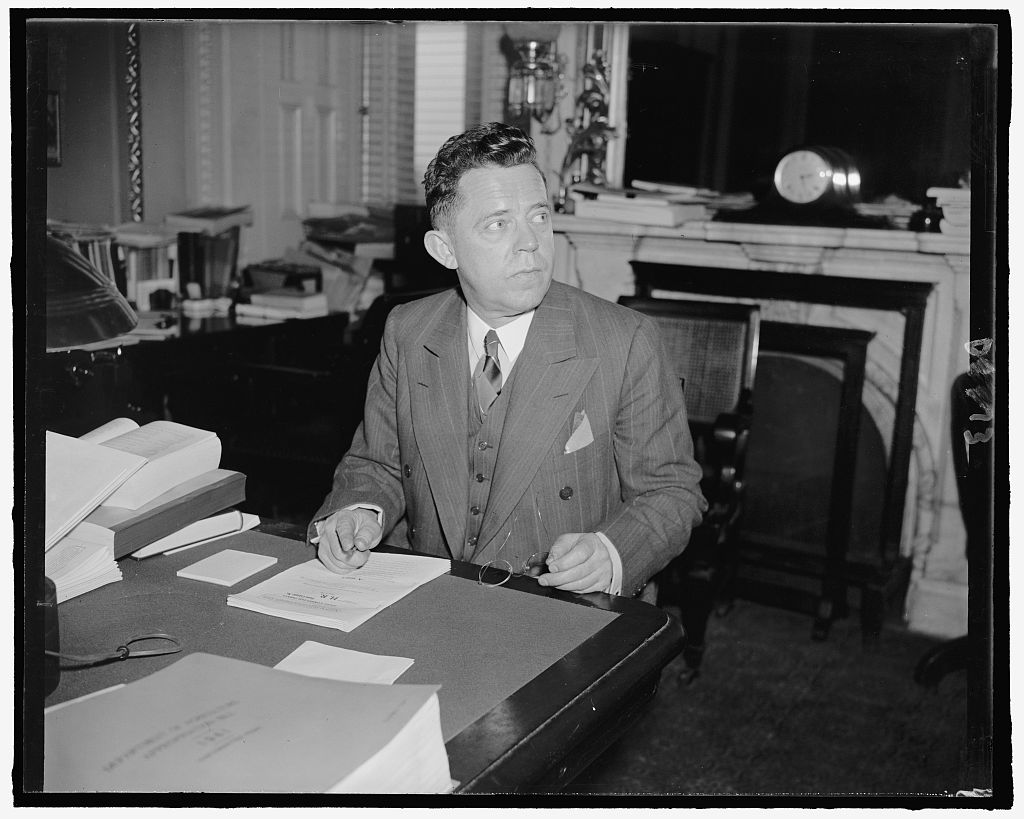

Member of the U.S. House of Representatives from Illinois
- In office January 3, 1935 – January 3, 1941
- Preceded by: James Simpson, Jr.
- Succeeded by: George A. Paddock
- Constituency: 10th district
- In office January 3, 1943 – March 21, 1950
- Preceded by: George A. Paddock
- Succeeded by: Marguerite S. Church
- Constituency: 10th district (1943–49); 13th district (1949–50)

Personal details
- Born: May 5, 1883 Vermilion County, Illinois, U.S.
- Died: March 21, 1950 (aged 66) Washington D.C., U.S.
- Resting place: Skokie, Illinois, U.S.
- Party: Republican
- Spouse: Marguerite Stitt (m. 1918)
- Education: University of Michigan; Northwestern University

Ralph Edwin Church (May 5, 1883 – March 21, 1950) was an American lawyer and Republican politician. He served in the Illinois House of Representatives from 1917 to 1932 and then represented the northern suburbs of Chicago in the United States House of Representatives for seven terms. He died in office in 1950 while testifying at a congressional hearing.

== Early life and career ==
Church was born on a farm near Catlin, Illinois in Vermillion County, Illinois. He went to Danville High School in Danville, Illinois. He received his bachelor's degree from University of Michigan and his master's and law degrees from Northwestern University. Church was admitted to the Illinois bar in 1909 and practiced law in Chicago, Illinois. He lived with his wife Marguerite S. Church and their family in Evanston, Illinois. He served in the United States Navy during World War I.

== Political career ==
Church served in the Illinois House of Representatives from 1917 to 1932 as a Republican. Church then served in the United States House of Representatives from 1935 to 1941 and from 1943 until his death in 1950. Church died suddenly while giving testimony before a Congressional House committee about expenditures. His wife Marguerite was elected in a special election to succeed her husband in the United States House of Representatives.

== See also ==
- List of members of the United States Congress who died in office (1950–1999)

U.S. House of Representatives
Preceded by James Simpson, Jr.	Member of the U.S. House of Representatives from Illinois's 10th congressional district 1935 – 1941	Succeeded by George A. Paddock
Preceded by George A. Paddock	Member of the U.S. House of Representatives from Illinois's 10th congressional district 1943 – 1949	Succeeded by Richard W. Hoffman
Preceded by Leo E. Allen	Member of the U.S. House of Representatives from Illinois's 13th congressional district 1949 – 1950	Succeeded by Marguerite Stitt Church
