= Lorene Wiswell Wilson =

American clubwoman

- Wilson, from a 1921 publication
- Born: Hessie Lorene Doyle; October 1876; Denver, Colorado, U.S.
- Died: April 11, 1960 (aged 83); Long Beach, California, U.S.
- Other names: Lorene Doyle Wiswell, Lorene Doyle Wilson, Hessie Doyle Wiswell
- Occupations: Writer, politician, educator, activist
- Relatives: Clyde Doyle (brother)

Hessie Lorene Doyle Wiswell Wilson (October 1876 – April 11, 1960) was an American writer, educator, clubwoman, lecturer, politician, and activist. She was president of the Seattle Women's Trade Union League, and wrote civic pageants, some performed by casts of over 1000 performers. She was later president of the Women's Democratic League in Long Beach, California.

== Early life ==
Hessie Lorene Doyle was born in Denver, Colorado, and raised in Oakland, California, the daughter of Thomas Doyle and Nettie Gilman Doyle. Her younger brother Clyde Gilman Doyle was a Congressman. As a young woman, Doyle ran a kindergarten in Oakland.

== Career ==
After her first marriage, Wiswell ran a private kindergarten in Seattle, advocated for more playgrounds, was active in the Century Club, and organized the city's first parent-teacher associations. She lectured on the Chautauqua circuit and wrote civic pageants. "It is art for the people by the people, it is democratic," she explained in 1918. "Everyone has some kind of talent." Her pageant "The World Democracy" was performed in four Seattle parks on July 4, 1918.

She was president of the Seattle Women's Trade Union League, and represented the League at national WTUL meetings. In 1919 Wilson was the Farmer–Labor Party candidate for a school board seat; she finished in third place. In 1920 she was the party's candidate for a Washington House seat; she finished in fifth place. In 1922 she organized a fundraising "relief bazaar" for striking miners' families, and she directed a children's pageant for Labor Day, at the University of Washington stadium.

She lived in Long Beach, California, in the 1930s and 1940s, where she was president of the Women's Democratic League, and chaired the parks and playgrounds committee of the Women's City Club. She directed a historical pageant in Bakersfield in 1933. In 1945 she attended the organizational meeting of the United Nations in San Francisco.

== Publications ==
- "Adventuring with Labor in the Far West" (1921)

== Personal life ==
Wiswell married Thomas Chaloner Wiswell in Chicago in 1896, and had a daughter, Grace, who died in 1928. Her husband resigned his pastorate in 1903 to work as a tradesman. She married her second husband, horticulturist James Cowan Wilson, in 1912. He died in a car accident in 1937. She died in 1960, at the age of 83, in Long Beach.
