= List of United States senators in the 84th Congress =

This is a complete list of United States senators during the 84th United States Congress listed by seniority from January 3, 1955, to January 3, 1957.

Order of service is based on the commencement of the senator's first term. Behind this is former service as a senator (only giving the senator seniority within their new incoming class), service as vice president, a House member, a cabinet secretary, or a governor of a state. The final factor is the population of the senator's state.

In this congress, Richard Russell, Jr. (D-Georgia) was the most senior junior senator and Roman Hruska (R-Nebraska) was the most junior senior senator.

Senators who were sworn in during the middle of the two-year congressional term (up until the last senator who was not sworn in early after winning the November 1956 election) are listed at the end of the list with no number.

== Terms of service ==
Class	Terms of service of senators that expired in years
Class 3	Terms of service of senators that expired in 1957 (AL, AR, AZ, CA, CO, CT, FL, GA, ID, IL, IN, IA, KS, KY, LA, MD, MO, NC, ND, NH, NV, NY, OH, OK, OR, PA, SC, SD, UT, VT, WA, and WI.)
Class 1	Terms of service of senators that expired in 1959 (AZ, CA, CT, DE, FL, IN, MA, MD, ME, MI, MN, MO, MS, MT, ND, NE, NJ, NM, NV, NY, OH, PA, RI, TN, TX, UT, VA, VT, WA, WI, WV, and WY.)
Class 2	Terms of service of senators that expired in 1961 (AL, AR, CO, DE, GA, IA, ID, IL, KS, KY, LA, MA, ME, MI, MN, MS, MT, NC, NE, NH, NJ, NM, OK, OR, RI, SC, SD, TN, TX, VA, WV, and WY.)

== U.S. Senate seniority list ==
U.S. Senate seniority
Rank	Senator (party-state)	Seniority date	Other factors
1	Walter F. George (D-GA)	November 22, 1922	
2	Carl Hayden (D-AZ)	March 4, 1927	
3	Richard Russell, Jr. (D-GA)	January 12, 1933	
4	Harry F. Byrd, Sr. (D-VA)	March 4, 1933	
5	James Murray (D-MT)	November 7, 1934	
6	Dennis Chavez (D-NM)	May 11, 1935	
7	Theodore F. Green (D-RI)	January 3, 1937	Former Governor, Rhode Island 37th in population (1930)
8	Styles Bridges (R-NH)	January 3, 1937	Former Governor, New Hampshire 41st in population (1930)
9	Allen J. Ellender (D-LA)	January 3, 1937	
10	Joseph L. Hill (D-AL)	January 11, 1938	
11	Alexander Wiley (R-WI)	January 3, 1939	
12	William Langer (R-ND)	January 3, 1941	Former Governor
13	Harley M. Kilgore (D-WV)	January 3, 1941	
14	George Aiken (R-VT)	January 10, 1941	
15	Eugene D. Millikin (R-CO)	December 20, 1941	
16	James Eastland (D-MS)	January 3, 1943	Previously a Senator
17	John Little McClellan (D-AR)	January 3, 1943	
18	Howard A. Smith (R-NJ)	December 7, 1944	
19	Warren G. Magnuson (D-WA)	December 14, 1944	
20	J. William Fulbright (D-AR)	January 3, 1945	Former Representative
21	Bourke B. Hickenlooper (R-IA)	January 3, 1945	Former Governor, Iowa 20th in population (1940)
22	Olin D. Johnston (D-SC)	January 3, 1945	Former Governor, South Carolina 26th in population (1940)
23	Homer E. Capehart (R-IN)	January 3, 1945	Indiana 12th in population (1940)
24	Wayne Morse (D-OR)	January 3, 1945	Oregon 34th in population (1940)
25	Leverett Saltonstall (R-MA)	January 4, 1945	
26	Milton Young (R-ND)	March 12, 1945	
27	William F. Knowland (R-CA)	August 26, 1945	
28	Spessard Holland (D-FL)	September 25, 1946	
29	Ralph Flanders (R-VT)	November 1, 1946	
30	A. Willis Robertson (D-VA)	November 6, 1946	Former Representative (13 years and 10 months)
31	John Sparkman (D-AL)	November 6, 1946	Former Representative (9 years and 10 months)
32	William E. Jenner (R-IN)	January 3, 1947	Previously a senator
33	Edward Martin (R-PA)	January 3, 1947	Former Governor, Pennsylvania 2nd in population (1940)
34	John W. Bricker (R-OH)	January 3, 1947	Former Governor, Ohio 4th in population (1940)
35	Edward John Thye (R-MN)	January 3, 1947	Former Governor, Minnesota 18th in population (1940)
36	Irving Ives (R-NY)	January 3, 1947	New York 1st in population (1940)
37	Joseph McCarthy (R-WI)	January 3, 1947	Wisconsin 13th in population (1940)
38	Arthur Vivian Watkins (R-UT)	January 3, 1947	Utah 40th in population (1940)
39	John J. Williams (R-DE)	January 3, 1947	47th in population (1940)
40	George W. Malone (R-NV)	January 3, 1947	Nevada 48th in population (1940)
41	John C. Stennis (D-MS)	November 17, 1947	
42	Karl Mundt (R-SD)	December 31, 1948	Former Representative
43	Russell B. Long (D-LA)	December 31, 1948	
44	Matthew M. Neely (D-WV)	January 3, 1949	Previously a senator
45	Lyndon Johnson (D-TX)	January 3, 1949	Former Representative (12 years)
46	Estes Kefauver (D-TN)	January 3, 1949	Former Representative (10 years)
47	Margaret Chase Smith (R-ME)	January 3, 1949	Former Representative (8 years and 7 months)
48	Clinton Anderson (D-NM)	January 3, 1949	Former Representative (4 years)
49	Robert S. Kerr (D-OK)	January 3, 1949	Former Governor, Oklahoma 22nd in population (1940)
50	Andrew F. Schoeppel (R-KS)	January 3, 1949	Former Governor, Kansas 29th in population (1940)
51	Paul Douglas (D-IL)	January 3, 1949	Illinois 3rd in population (1940)
52	Hubert Humphrey (D-MN)	January 3, 1949	Minnesota 18th in population (1940)
53	Joseph Frear, Jr. (D-DE)	January 3, 1949	Delaware 47th in population (1940)
54	Henry Dworshak (R-ID)	October 14, 1949	
55	Herbert H. Lehman (D-NY)	November 9, 1949	
56	Frank Carlson (R-KS)	November 27, 1950	Former Representative (12 years)
57	Earle C. Clements (D-KY)	November 27, 1950	Former Representative (3 years)
58	John O. Pastore (D-RI)	December 19, 1950	
59	Everett Dirksen (R-IL)	January 3, 1951	Former Representative (16 years)
60	Francis H. Case (R-SD)	January 3, 1951	Former Representative (14 years)
61	Almer Monroney (D-OK)	January 3, 1951	Former Representative (12 years)
62	Thomas C. Hennings, Jr. (D-MO)	January 3, 1951	Former Representative (6 years)
63	George Smathers (D-FL)	January 3, 1951	Former Representative (4 years)
64	John M. Butler (R-MD)	January 3, 1951	Maryland 28th in population (1940)
65	Wallace F. Bennett (R-UT)	January 3, 1951	Utah 40th in population (1940)
66	Herman Welker (R-ID)	January 3, 1951	Idaho 43rd in population (1940)
67	James H. Duff (R-PA)	January 16, 1951	
68	Charles E. Potter (R-MI)	November 5, 1952	Former Representative
69	Prescott Bush (R-CT)	November 5, 1952	
70	Thomas Kuchel (R-CA)	January 2, 1953	
71	William A. Purtell (R-CT)	January 3, 1953	Previously a senator
72	Albert Gore, Sr. (D-TN)	January 3, 1953	Former Representative (14 years)
73	Henry M. Jackson (D-WA)	January 3, 1953	Former Representative (12 years)
74	James Glenn Beall (R-MD)	January 3, 1953	Former Representative (10 years), Maryland 24th in population (1950)
75	Mike Mansfield (D-MT)	January 3, 1953	Former Representative (10 years), Montana 42nd in population (1950)
76	John F. Kennedy (D-MA)	January 3, 1953	Former Representative (6 years)
77	Frederick G. Payne (R-ME)	January 3, 1953	Former Governor, Maine 35th in population (1950)
78	Frank A. Barrett (R-WY)	January 3, 1953	Former Governor, Wyoming 48th in population (1950)
79	Price Daniel (D-TX)	January 3, 1953	Texas 6th in population (1950)
80	Stuart Symington (D-MO)	January 3, 1953	Missouri 12th in population (1950)
81	Barry Goldwater (R-AZ)	January 3, 1953	Arizona 37th in population (1950)
82	Sam Ervin (D-NC)	June 5, 1954	
83	Norris Cotton (R-NH)	November 8, 1954	Former Representative (7 years and 10 months)
84	Roman Hruska (R-NE)	November 8, 1954	Former Representative (1 year and 10 months)
85	Joseph C. O'Mahoney (D-WY)	November 29, 1954	Previously a senator
86	W. Kerr Scott (D-NC)	November 29, 1954	
87	Alan Bible (D-NV)	December 2, 1954	
88	George H. Bender (R-OH)	December 16, 1954	
89	Strom Thurmond (I-SC)	December 24, 1954	
90	Carl Curtis (R-NE)	January 1, 1955	
91	Alben W. Barkley (D-KY)	January 3, 1955	Previously a senator
92	Clifford P. Case (R-NJ)	January 3, 1955	Former Representative (8 years)
93	Thomas Martin (R-IA)	January 3, 1955	Former Representative (6 years)
94	Patrick V. McNamara (D-MI)	January 3, 1955	Maryland 24th in population (1950)
95	Richard L. Neuberger (D-OR)	January 3, 1955	Oregon 31st in population (1950)
96	Gordon L. Allott (R-CO)	January 3, 1955	Colorado 32nd in population (1950)
	William R. Laird, III (D-WV)	March 13, 1956	
	Thomas A. Wofford (D-SC)	April 5, 1956	
	Robert Humphreys (R-KY)	June 21, 1956	
	W. Chapman Revercomb (R-WV)	November 7, 1956	Previously a senator (6 years)
	John Sherman Cooper (R-KY)	November 7, 1956	Previously a senator (twice) (total tenure 4 years and 4 months)
	Strom Thurmond (D-SC)	November 7, 1956	Previously a senator (1 year and 3 months)

The most senior senators by class were Harry F. Byrd Sr. (D-Virginia) from Class 1, Richard Russell Jr. (D-Georgia) from Class 2, and Walter F. George (D-Georgia) from Class 3. Russell was the most senior senator from his class being the junior senator from his state.

== See also ==
- 84th United States Congress
- List of United States representatives in the 84th Congress
