= Craig Hosmer =

United States Member of Congress (1915–1982)

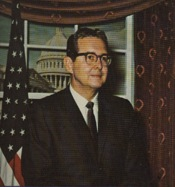

Member of the U.S. House of Representatives from California
- In office January 3, 1953 – December 31, 1974
- Preceded by: Clyde Doyle
- Succeeded by: Mark W. Hannaford (redistricting)
- Constituency: 18th district (1953–63); 32nd district (1963–74)

Personal details
- Born: Chester Craig Hosmer; May 6, 1915 Brea, California
- Died: October 11, 1982 (aged 67) North Pacific Ocean, aboard the Azure Seas
- Resting place: Arlington National Cemetery
- Party: Republican

Military service
- Allegiance: United States of America
- Branch/service: United States Navy
- Battles/wars: World War II

Chester Craig Hosmer (May 6, 1915 – October 11, 1982) was an American lawyer and politician who served eleven terms as a United States representative from California from 1953 to 1974.

== Early life and career ==
Hosmer was born in Brea, California, in Orange County. He attended the public schools, graduated from Long Beach Polytechnic High School. Hosmer graduated from the University of California, Berkeley in 1937.

He attended the University of Michigan Law School in 1938 and graduated from the University of Southern California Law School in 1940. Hosmer was admitted to the bar in 1940 and began practice in Long Beach, California.

=== Military career ===
He enlisted in the United States Navy in July 1940 and advanced to the rank of commander; rear admiral, Naval Reserve.

=== Legal career ===
He was an attorney with the U.S. Atomic Energy Commission at Los Alamos, New Mexico and special assistant United States District Attorney for New Mexico in 1948. He then returned to Long Beach, California to private practice.

== Congress ==
Hosmer was an unsuccessful Republican candidate for election in 1950 to the Eighty-second Congress. He was elected as a Republican to the Eighty-third and to the ten succeeding Congresses and served from January 3, 1953, until his resignation December 31, 1974. Hosmer voted in favor of the Civil Rights Acts of 1957, 1960, 1964, and 1968, as well as the 24th Amendment to the U.S. Constitution, but did not vote on the Voting Rights Act of 1965. He was not a candidate for reelection in 1974 to the Ninety-fourth Congress.

Representative Hosmer was outraged by the 1967 USS Liberty incident and was one of the few Congressmen to call for an investigation. He was openly angry about the attack and called for restitution and legal recourse:

"I can only conclude that the coordinated attack by aircraft and motor torpedo boats on the U.S.S. Liberty 15 1/2 miles north of Sinai on June 8 which killed 34 officers and men of the Navy and wounded another 175 was deliberate. The fact that the U.S.S. Liberty was a Victory hull vessel, hundreds of which were produced and used by the U.S. Navy during World War II and since, rules out the possibility of mistaken identity. Every ship recognition book in the world has, for years, identified the characteristic Victory hull and superstructure of the U.S.S. Liberty as U.S. Navy property…Whatever the reason for the attack, it was an act of high piracy. Those responsible should be court-martialed on charges of murder, amongst other counts. The Israel Government should pay full reparations to the United States and indemnities to the families of the Americans killed."

== Later career and death ==
He was president of the American Nuclear Energy Council from 1975 to 1979. He was a resident of Washington, D.C. until his death on October 11, 1982, aboard a cruise ship bound for Mexico.

He was buried at Arlington National Cemetery, Arlington, Virginia.

== Electoral history ==
Craig Hosmer electoral history

1950 United States House of Representatives elections in California
Party	Candidate	Votes	%
Democratic	Clyde Doyle (incumbent)	97,177	50.5
Republican	Craig Hosmer	95,308	49.5
Total votes		192,485	100.0
Turnout			
Democratic hold			

1952 United States House of Representatives elections in California
Party	Candidate	Votes	%
Republican	Craig Hosmer	90,438	55.5
Democratic	Joseph M. Kennick	72,457	44.5
Total votes		162,895	100.0
Turnout			
Republican win (new seat)			

1954 United States House of Representatives elections in California
Party	Candidate	Votes	%
Republican	Craig Hosmer (incumbent)	71,731	55
Democratic	Joseph M. Kennick	58,647	45
Total votes		130,378	100
Turnout			
Republican hold			

1956 United States House of Representatives elections in California
Party	Candidate	Votes	%
Republican	Craig Hosmer (incumbent)	103,108	59.3
Democratic	Raymond C. "Ray" Simpson	70,911	40.7
Total votes		174,019	100.0
Turnout			
Republican hold			

1958 United States House of Representatives elections in California
Party	Candidate	Votes	%
Republican	Craig Hosmer (incumbent)	95,682	60
Democratic	Harry S. May	63,684	40
Total votes		159,366	100
Turnout			
Republican hold			

1960 United States House of Representatives elections in California
Party	Candidate	Votes	%
Republican	Craig Hosmer (incumbent)	129,851	70
Democratic	D. Patrick Ahern	55,735	30
Total votes		185,586	100
Turnout			
Republican hold			

1962 United States House of Representatives elections in California
Party	Candidate	Votes	%
Republican	Craig Hosmer (Incumbent)	115,915	70.2
Democratic	J. J. Johovich	47,917	29.8
Total votes		163,832	100.0
Republican hold			

1964 United States House of Representatives elections in California
Party	Candidate	Votes	%
Republican	Craig Hosmer (Incumbent)	132,603	68.9
Democratic	Michael Cullen	59,765	31.1
Total votes		192,368	100.0
Republican hold			

1966 United States House of Representatives elections in California
Party	Candidate	Votes	%
Republican	Craig Hosmer (Incumbent)	139,328	80.1
Democratic	Tracy Odell	34,609	19.9
Total votes		173,937	100.0
Republican hold			

1968 United States House of Representatives elections in California
Party	Candidate	Votes	%
Republican	Craig Hosmer (Incumbent)	138,494	73.8
Democratic	Arthur J. Gottlieb	45,308	24.1
American Independent	Richard B. Williams	3,898	2.1
Total votes		187,700	100.0
Republican hold			

1970 United States House of Representatives elections in California
Party	Candidate	Votes	%
Republican	Craig Hosmer (Incumbent)	119,340	71.5
Democratic	Walter L. Mallonee	44,278	26.5
Peace and Freedom	John S. Donohue	3,227	2.0
Total votes		166,845	100.0
Republican hold			

1972 United States House of Representatives elections in California
Party	Candidate	Votes	%
Republican	Craig Hosmer (Incumbent)	147,016	65.9
Democratic	Dennis Murray	71,394	32.0
Peace and Freedom	John S. Donohue	4,804	2.1
Total votes		223,214	100.0
Republican hold			

U.S. House of Representatives
Preceded by Clyde Doyle	Member of the U.S. House of Representatives from California's 18th congressional district 1953–1963	Succeeded by Harlan Hagen
Preceded by None	Member of the U.S. House of Representatives from California's 32nd congressional district 1963–1974	Succeeded by Glenn M. Anderson
