= Willis W. Bradley =

American politician (1884–1954)

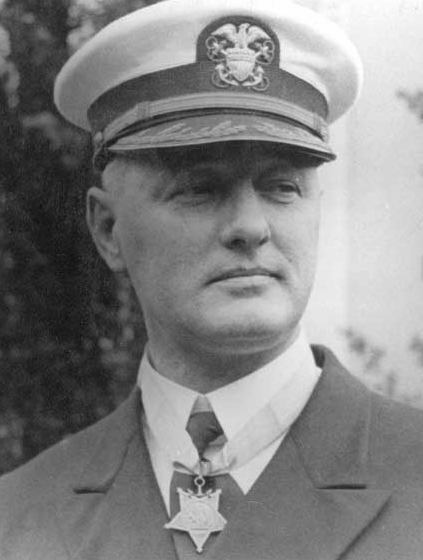
- Commander Willis W. Bradley, photographed during the 1920s, wearing the Medal of Honor

Member of the California State Assembly from the 70th district
- In office January 5, 1953 – August 27, 1954
- Preceded by: William S. Grant
- Succeeded by: William S. Grant

Member of the U.S. House of Representatives from California's 18th district
- In office January 3, 1947 – January 3, 1949
- Preceded by: Clyde Doyle
- Succeeded by: Clyde Doyle

33rd Naval Governor of Guam
- In office June 11, 1929 – March 15, 1931
- Preceded by: Lloyd Stowell Shapley
- Succeeded by: Edmund Root

Personal details
- Born: Willis Winter Bradley Jr. June 28, 1884 Ransomville, New York, U.S.
- Died: August 27, 1954 (aged 70) Santa Barbara, California, U.S.
- Resting place: Fort Rosecrans National Cemetery, San Diego, California
- Party: Republican
- Spouse: Sue Worthington Bradley (m. 1907)
- Military career
- Relatives: Bruce McCandless (son-in-law)
- Allegiance: United States of America
- Branch: United States Navy
- Service years: 1906–1946
- Rank: Captain
- Unit: USS Pittsburgh
- Conflicts: World War I World War II
- Awards: Medal of Honor
- Other work: Politician

Willis Winter Bradley Jr. (June 28, 1884 – August 27, 1954) was a mid-20th-century American Naval officer, a recipient of the Medal of Honor, Naval Governor of Guam, and a U.S. Representative from California.

== Early life ==
Born in Ransomville, New York, Bradley moved with his parents to Milnor, North Dakota, in July 1884 and to Forman, North Dakota, in 1891. He attended the public schools, and Hamline University, St. Paul, Minnesota. He served as the deputy registrant of deeds of Sargent County, North Dakota, in 1902 and 1903.

Bradley graduated from the United States Naval Academy on September 12, 1906 as a member of the class of 1907. His classmates included Patrick N. L. Bellinger, Henry K. Hewitt, George M. Courts, Claud A. Jones, and Raymond A. Spruance.

== Military career ==
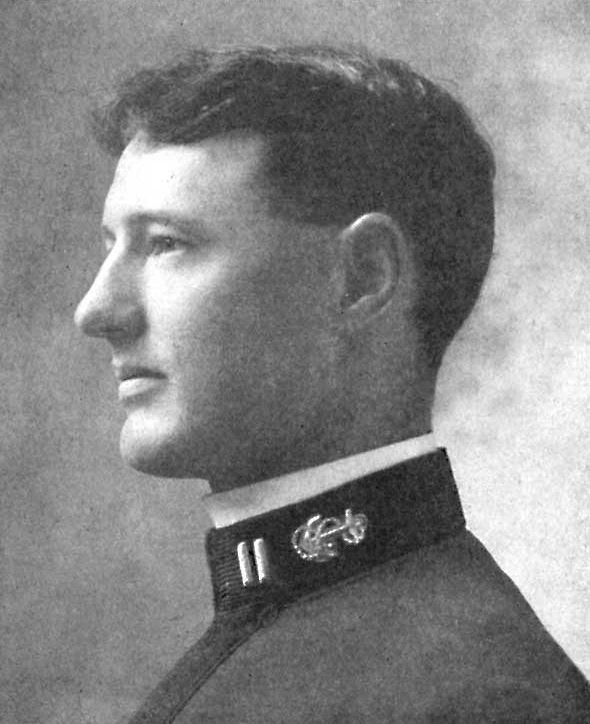
Bradley c. 1913–1917

Bradley went to sea in USS Virginia (BB-13). After two years at sea as a passed midshipman, he received his commission as an ensign on September 13, 1908.

Successively, Bradley served in USS Culgoa (AF-3) from the fall of 1908 to October 1910, helped to fit out and commission USS Perkins (DD-26) (Torpedo Boat Destroyer No. 26), and served in her until March 1911. While serving on the USS Culgoa, which was sent to aid survivors of the terrible 1908 Messina earthquake, he worked tirelessly to rescue survivors and clear bodies and debris from the scene. For his work, he later received a medal from the Pope. From then until September 1912, he saw duty, first in the transport USS Hancock and then in USS South Carolina. Next, he commanded USS Biddle (TB-26) (Torpedo Boat No. 26) and the Reserve Torpedo Group at Annapolis, Md.

Beginning in September 1913, Bradley studied ordnance and explosives at the Naval Postgraduate School in Annapolis, Maryland, and then at George Washington University in Washington, D.C. He continued his studies at the Naval Proving Ground in Indian Head, Maryland, at Bausch & Lomb, and at the Midvale Steel Co. in Pittsburgh, Pa. In July 1915, Bradley returned to sea in command of USS Stewart. That December, he was transferred to command of USS Hull and of the Reserve Torpedo Division, Pacific Fleet.

After service in USS San Diego between September 1916 and February 1917, Bradley became gunnery officer on the USS Pittsburgh. In that capacity, he received the Medal of Honor (World War I) for his actions on July 23, 1917, during a powder explosion in one of the ship's casemates. Though temporarily stunned, he entered the compartment, saved a man's life, and then reentered the casemate to extinguish burning gunpowder.

Bradley moved ashore again in January 1918 to head the Explosives, Fuses, and Primers Section of the Bureau of Ordnance. From there, he went to the Naval Torpedo Station in Keyport, Washington, in August 1919 to serve as a naval inspector. Returning to sea in June 1920, Bradley served as gunnery officer in USS Texas (BB-35) until May 1921. At that time, he reported to the Mare Island Navy Yard to assist in fitting out and commissioning USS California (BB-44). After the battleship went into commission on August 10, he served as her gunnery officer.

Bradley returned to Keyport in May 1922 for two years of duty at the Naval Torpedo Station as the Naval Inspector in Charge.

From July 1924 to November 1926, he commanded USS Gold Star (AK-12), the station ship at Guam in the Mariana Islands.

Between late 1926 and the middle of 1929, Bradley served in the Naval Reserve Section in the Bureau of Navigation.

=== Naval Governor of Guam ===
Following that tour of duty, in June 1929, Bradley became a Naval Governor of Guam. As Governor, he issued Guam's first Bill of Rights, sought United States citizenship for the Chamorros and proclaimed them to be citizens of Guam, and reorganized the Guam Congress. He also made possible the first free elections of village commissioners. He was considered a Progressive Republican and civil libertarian.

On April 8, 1930, he created the only official government-run local post called "Guam Guard Mail". It used overprinted Philippine stamps for the 1st, 3rd, and 4th issues and a locally printed one for the 2nd. It was needed since the U.S. Post Office did not deliver the mail to individual homes or businesses. "Guam Guard Mail" lasted one year forcing the Post Office to take over the operation on the northern half of Guam on January 1, 1931, and the southern half on April 9, 1931.

=== Later naval service ===
Bradley resumed sea duty in July 1931 in command of USS Bridge (AF-1). Two years later, he became Captain of the Yard at the Pearl Harbor Navy Yard. After six months, however, he was transferred to command of USS Portland (CA-33).

That assignment lasted until June 1937 at which time he was reassigned to the Naval War College as a student. After a year of duty with the Pacific coast section of the Board of Inspection and Survey beginning in May 1938, Capt. Bradley commanded Destroyer Squadron (DesRon) 31, Battle Force, based in San Diego for a year. At the conclusion of that assignment, he resumed duty with the Board of Inspection and Survey on the west coast. He continued in that billet through the end of World War II and until his retirement on August 1, 1946.

== Political career ==
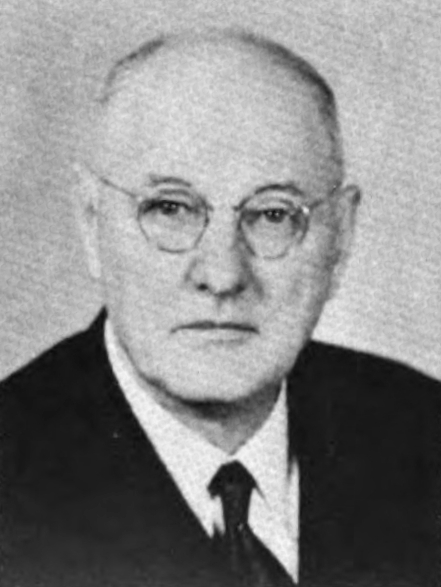
Bradley's official State Assembly portrait, 1954

Bradley was elected as a Republican to the Eightieth Congress (January 3, 1947 – January 3, 1949) from California's 18th congressional district. He was defeated for re-election in 1948 in a rematch against former congressman Clyde Doyle, whom Bradley had defeated in 1946. Bradley was active in the House in maritime issues and on the governance of Guam.

He served as assistant to the president of the Pacific Coast Steamship Co. from 1949 to 1952. He served as member of the California State Assembly from 1952 until his death.

== Personal life ==
On October 16, 1907, in Baltimore, Maryland, Bradley married Sue Worthington Cox.

On August 27, 1954, Bradley died in Santa Barbara, California. Bradley is interred at Fort Rosecrans National Cemetery in San Diego, California.

== Legacy ==
The USS Bradley (FF-1041), was named in his honor.

== Medal of Honor citation ==
Rank and organization: Commander, U.S. Navy. Born: 28 June 1884, Ransomville, N.Y. Appointed from: North Dakota. Citation:

For extraordinary heroism and devotion to duty while serving on the U.S.S. Pittsburgh, at the time of an accidental explosion of ammunition on that vessel. On 23 July 1917, some saluting cartridge cases were being reloaded in the after casemate: through an accident an explosion occurred. Comdr. Bradley (then Lieutenant), who was about to enter the casemate, was blown back by the explosion and rendered momentarily unconscious, but while still dazed, crawled into the casemate to extinguish burning materials in dangerous proximity to a considerable amount of powder, thus preventing further explosions.

== Namesakes ==
USS Bradley (FF-1041) was named in his honor.

== Federal election history ==
United States House of Representatives elections, 1946
Party	Candidate	Votes	%
Republican	Willis W. Bradley	67,363	52.8
Democratic	Clyde Doyle (incumbent)	60,218	47.2
Total votes		127,581	100.0
Turnout			
Republican gain from Democratic			

United States House of Representatives elections, 1948
Party	Candidate	Votes	%
Democratic	Clyde Doyle	105,687	51.1
Republican	Willis W. Bradley (incumbent)	92,721	44.9
Progressive	Stanley Moffatt	8,232	4.0
Total votes		206,640	100.0
Turnout			
Democratic gain from Republican			

== See also ==
- List of Medal of Honor recipients
- Bruce McCandless

California Assembly
Preceded by William S. Grant	California State Assemblymember; 70th District; January 5, 1953 – January 3, 1955	Succeeded by William S. Grant
U.S. House of Representatives
Preceded by Clyde Doyle	Member of the U.S. House of Representatives from California's 18th congressional district January 3, 1947 – January 3, 1949	Succeeded by Clyde Doyle
Military offices
Preceded by Lloyd Stowell Shapley	Naval Governor of Guam; 1929–1931	Succeeded by Edmund Root
