= Clyde Doyle =

American politician (1887–1963)

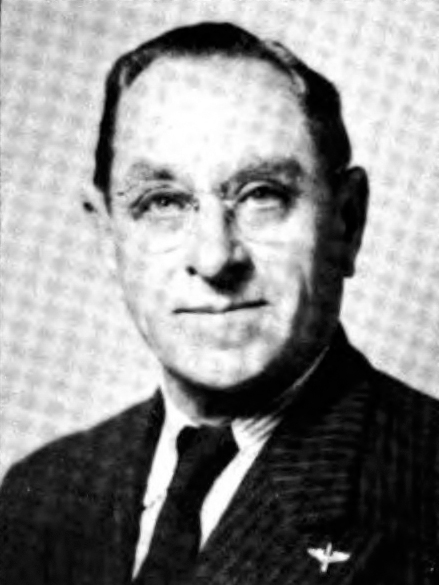

Member of the U.S. House of Representatives from California
- In office January 3, 1949 – March 14, 1963
- Preceded by: Willis W. Bradley
- Succeeded by: Del M. Clawson
- Constituency: 18th district (1949–53); 23rd district (1953–63)
- In office January 3, 1945 – January 3, 1947
- Preceded by: William Ward Johnson
- Succeeded by: Willis W. Bradley
- Constituency: 18th district

Personal details
- Born: Clyde Gilman Doyle; July 11, 1887 Oakland, California, U.S.
- Died: March 14, 1963 (aged 75) Arlington, Virginia, U.S.
- Party: Democratic
- Relations: Lorene Wiswell Wilson (sister)

Clyde Gilman Doyle (July 11, 1887 – March 14, 1963) was an American lawyer and politician who served as a United States representative from California in the mid-20th century.

== Early life and career ==
Clyde Doyle was born in Oakland, Alameda County, California and attended public schools in Oakland, Seattle, Washington, Los Angeles and Long Beach, California. Graduated from the College of Law of the University of Southern California at Los Angeles in 1917, he was admitted to the bar and commenced practice in Long Beach, California. He was a member and president of the Board of Freeholders, Long Beach, California in 1921 and 1922.

== Political career ==
Doyle was a member of the California State Board of Education. Elected as a Democrat to the Seventy-ninth Congress (January 3, 1945 – January 3, 1947), he failed to win re-election in 1946 but regained his seat in 1948. He served continuously in the Eighty-first and the seven succeeding Congresses from January 3, 1949, until his death.

During his time in Congress, Doyle had a strongly liberal voting record.

=== House Un-American Activities Committee ===
Doyle served on the House Un-American Activities Committee from 1951 until his death in 1963. His role on the committee is recalled unflatteringly in Beat Generation poet and fellow Californian Lawrence Ferlinghetti's 1958 poem "Dog" (published in his celebrated collection A Coney Island of the Mind):

But he has his own free world to live in
His own fleas to eat
He will not be muzzled
Congressman Doyle is just another
fire hydrant
to him

== Death ==
Doyle died in Arlington, Virginia on March 14, 1963, at the age of 75. After funeral services in Long Beach, he was cremated and the ashes were given to his family.

== Electoral history ==
1944 United States House of Representatives elections in California
Party	Candidate	Votes	%
Democratic	Clyde Doyle	95,090	55.7
Republican	William Ward Johnson (inc.)	75,749	44.3
Total votes		170,839	100.0
Turnout			
Democratic gain from Republican			

1946 United States House of Representatives elections in California
Party	Candidate	Votes	%
Republican	Willis W. Bradley	67,363	52.8
Democratic	Clyde Doyle (incumbent)	60,218	47.2
Total votes		127,581	100.0
Turnout			
Republican gain from Democratic			

1948 United States House of Representatives elections in California
Party	Candidate	Votes	%
Democratic	Clyde Doyle	105,687	51.1
Republican	Willis W. Bradley (incumbent)	92,721	44.9
Progressive	Stanley Moffatt	8,232	4.0
Total votes		206,640	100.0
Turnout			
Democratic gain from Republican			

1950 United States House of Representatives elections in California
Party	Candidate	Votes	%
Democratic	Clyde Doyle (incumbent)	97,177	50.5
Republican	Craig Hosmer	95,308	49.5
Total votes		192,485	100.0
Turnout			
Democratic hold			

1952 election
Party	Candidate	Votes	%
Democratic	Clyde Doyle (Incumbent)	138,356	87.5%
Progressive	Olive T. Thompson	17,501	11.1%
Republican	C. Cleveland (write-in)	2,329	1.4%
Total votes		158,186	100.0%
Turnout			
Democratic hold			

1954 election
Party	Candidate	Votes	%
Democratic	Clyde Doyle (Incumbent)	90,729	70.9%
Republican	Frank G. Bussing	34,911	27.3%
Progressive	Olive T. Thompson	2,293	1.8%
Total votes		127,933	100.0%
Turnout			
Democratic hold			

1956 election
Party	Candidate	Votes	%
Democratic	Clyde Doyle (Incumbent)	120,109	70.9%
Republican	E. Elgie "Cal" Calvin	49,198	29.1%
Total votes		169,207	100.0%
Turnout			
Democratic hold			

1958 election
Party	Candidate	Votes	%
Democratic	Clyde Doyle (Incumbent)	140,817	100.0%
Turnout			
Democratic hold			

1960 election
Party	Candidate	Votes	%
Democratic	Clyde Doyle (Incumbent)	148,415	74.2%
Republican	Emmett A. Schwartz	51,548	25.8%
Total votes		199,963	100.0%
Turnout			
Democratic hold			

== See also ==
- List of members of the United States Congress who died in office (1950–1999)

U.S. House of Representatives
Preceded by William Ward Johnson	Member of the U.S. House of Representatives from California's 18th congressional district 1945–1947	Succeeded by Willis W. Bradley
Preceded by Willis W. Bradley	Member of the U.S. House of Representatives from California's 18th congressional district 1949–1953	Succeeded by Craig Hosmer
Preceded by None	Member of the U.S. House of Representatives from California's 23rd congressional district 1953–1963	Succeeded by Del M. Clawson
