= Richard W. Hoffman =

American politician

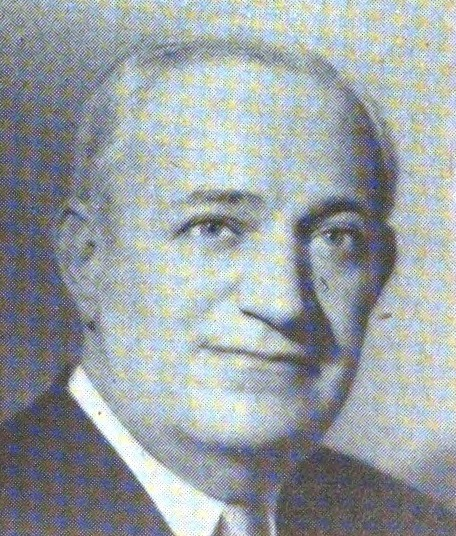
- From 1955's Pocket Congressional Directory of the Eighty-fourth Congress

Member of the U.S. House of Representatives from Illinois's 10th district
- In office January 3, 1949 – January 3, 1957
- Preceded by: Ralph E. Church
- Succeeded by: Harold R. Collier

Personal details
- Born: December 23, 1893 Chicago, Illinois
- Died: July 6, 1975 (aged 81) Maywood, Illinois
- Party: Republican

Richard William Hoffman (December 23, 1893 – July 6, 1975) was a U.S. Representative from Illinois.

Born in Chicago, Illinois, Hoffman was a veteran of the First World War. He engaged in the printing and publishing business. He owned and operated radio stations in Chicago, Illinois. He served as president of the board of education of J. Sterling Morton High School and Junior College 1933-1936 and 1939–1948.

Hoffman was elected as a Republican to the Eighty-first and to the three succeeding Congresses (January 3, 1949 – January 3, 1957). He was not a candidate for renomination in 1956 to the Eighty-fifth Congress.

He resumed former business activities. He resided in Riverside, Illinois. He died in Maywood, Illinois, July 6, 1975. He was interred in Forest Home Cemetery, Forest Park, Illinois.

U.S. House of Representatives
Preceded by Ralph E. Church	Member of the U.S. House of Representatives from Illinois's 10th congressional district 1949–1957	Succeeded by Harold R. Collier
