= Guam Museum =

Museum focusing on the history of Guam

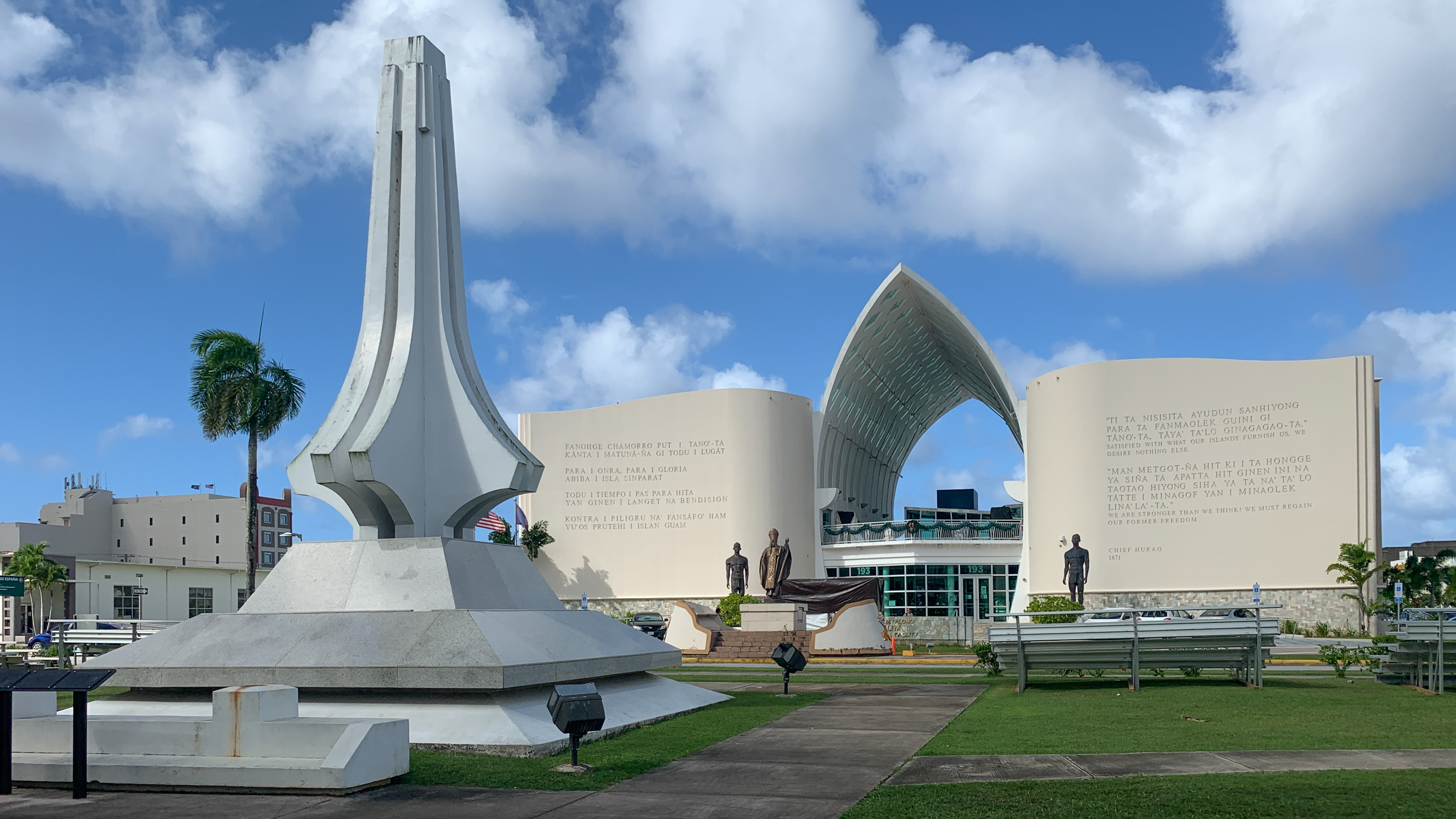
- Front of the Guam Museum in 2019

- Location within Guam
- Established: 1980
- Location: 193 Chalan Santo Papa; Juan Pablo Dos; Hagåtña, GU 96910
- Coordinates: 13.4752°N 144.7517°E
- Type: Culture, History, Art
- Collection size: 250,000
- Website: Official website

The Guam Museum, formally the Senator Antonio M. Palomo Guam Museum & Chamorro Educational Facility, is a museum focusing on the history of Guam, a U.S. territory in Micronesia. A permanent building to house the museum's collection opened in Hagåtña on November 4, 2016. The Guam Museum had been housed in temporary locations since World War II.

== History ==
=== Establishment and destruction ===
The Guam Museum was founded by the American Legion Mid-Pacific Post 1 in 1932 in Agana, Guam (present-day Hagåtña). The American Legion operated the museum from its establishment in 1932 until 1936, when control was transferred to the United States Navy. That same year, Guam Governor George A. Alexander officially established the Guam Museum as a government institution through an executive order. The museum's early collection included documents and artifact's from the island's pre-Spanish period.

Guam was invaded by the Empire of Japan in December 1941 and occupied until 1944. The original museum building, along with its entire collection, was destroyed during the 1944 Battle of Guam in which American forces liberated the island from Japanese control.

=== Temporary locations ===
No new museum building was constructed during the postwar period. On November 24, 1953, Governor Ford Quint Elvidge established the Parks, Monuments, and Museum Committee to re-establish the Guam Museum. The Governor also tasked the Guam Museum with the preservation of Spanish colonial structures and researching the island's history, folklore, and geology. Governor Elvidge appointed Dr. J. Henry Baird as the curator of the Guam Museum and chairman of the Parks, Monuments, and Museum Committee. Still, no structure to house the Guam Museum was built.

Former Senator Antonio Palomo, a journalist and historian who specialized in Guam, served as the director of the Guam Museum from December 1995 until his retirement on June 13, 2007. Palomo supported the creation of a permanent building for the museum.

An exhibition of Guam's history, operated by the Guam Museum, opened within the Micronesia Mall in April 2004. The exhibit, which was run by the Guam Museum, attracted 200,000 visitors.

=== Permanent museum proposed (2014) ===
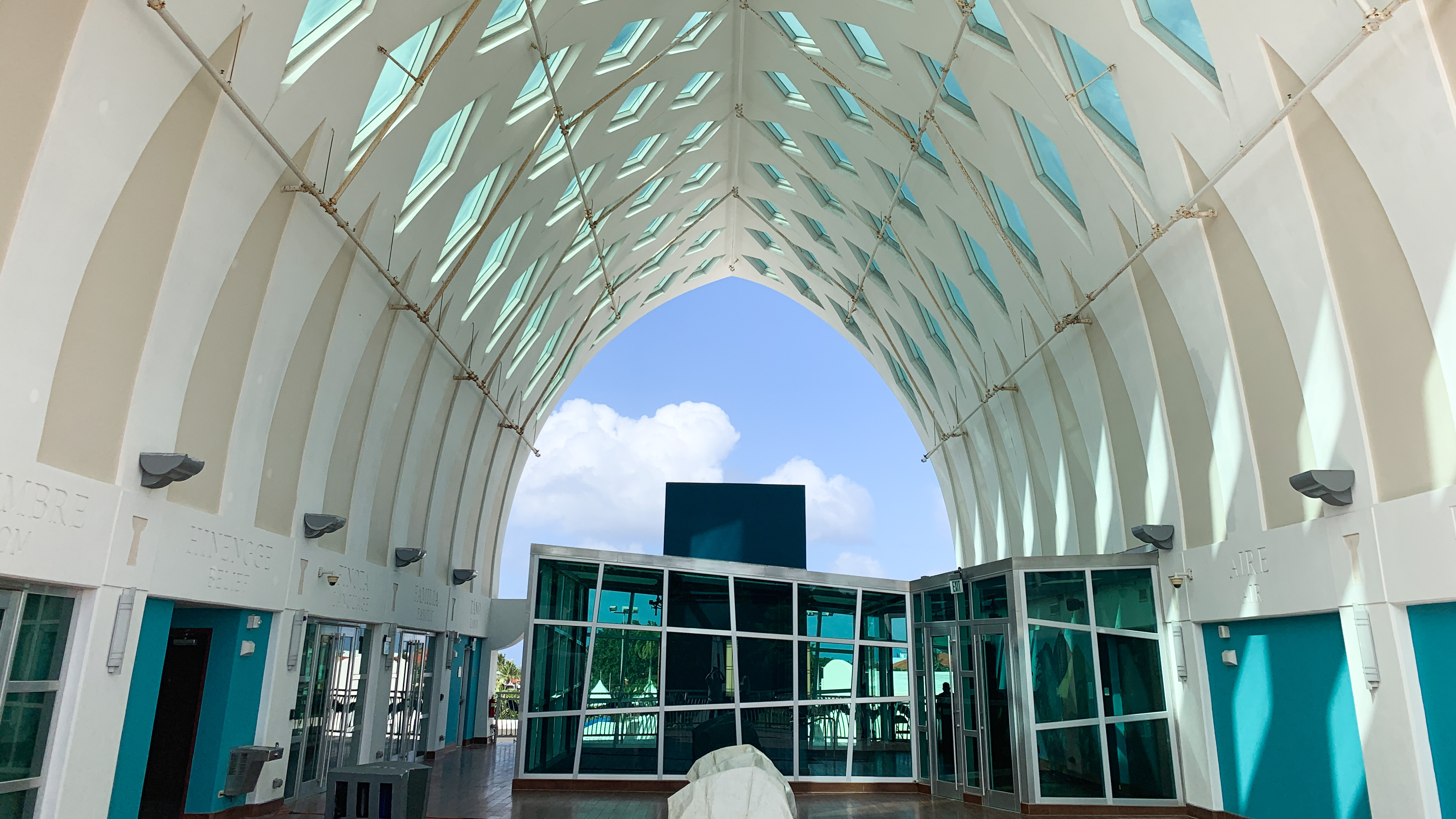
Second floor of the museum

The historic Fort Santa Agueda in Hagåtña was originally proposed as a possible new location for the Guam Museum. However, the Fort is listed on the National Register of Historic Places listings in Guam and managed by the Guam Historical Preservation Trust, which ruled its use.

Initial plans for a permanent, modern museum building were first unveiled in 2006.

A groundbreaking ceremony for a new, $27 million permanent home for the Guam Museum was held on February 5, 2013. Construction on the facility, which will house artifacts spanning the island's 4,000 year history, is being funded Hotel Occupancy Tax bond, established by the Public Law 30-228. The museum is on Skinner Plaza in downtown Hagåtña, near the Dulce Nombre de Maria Cathedral Basilica. The new, three-story museum building will include a mezzanine. The museum will also include a cafe, outdoor activity area, theater, bookstore, and atrium.

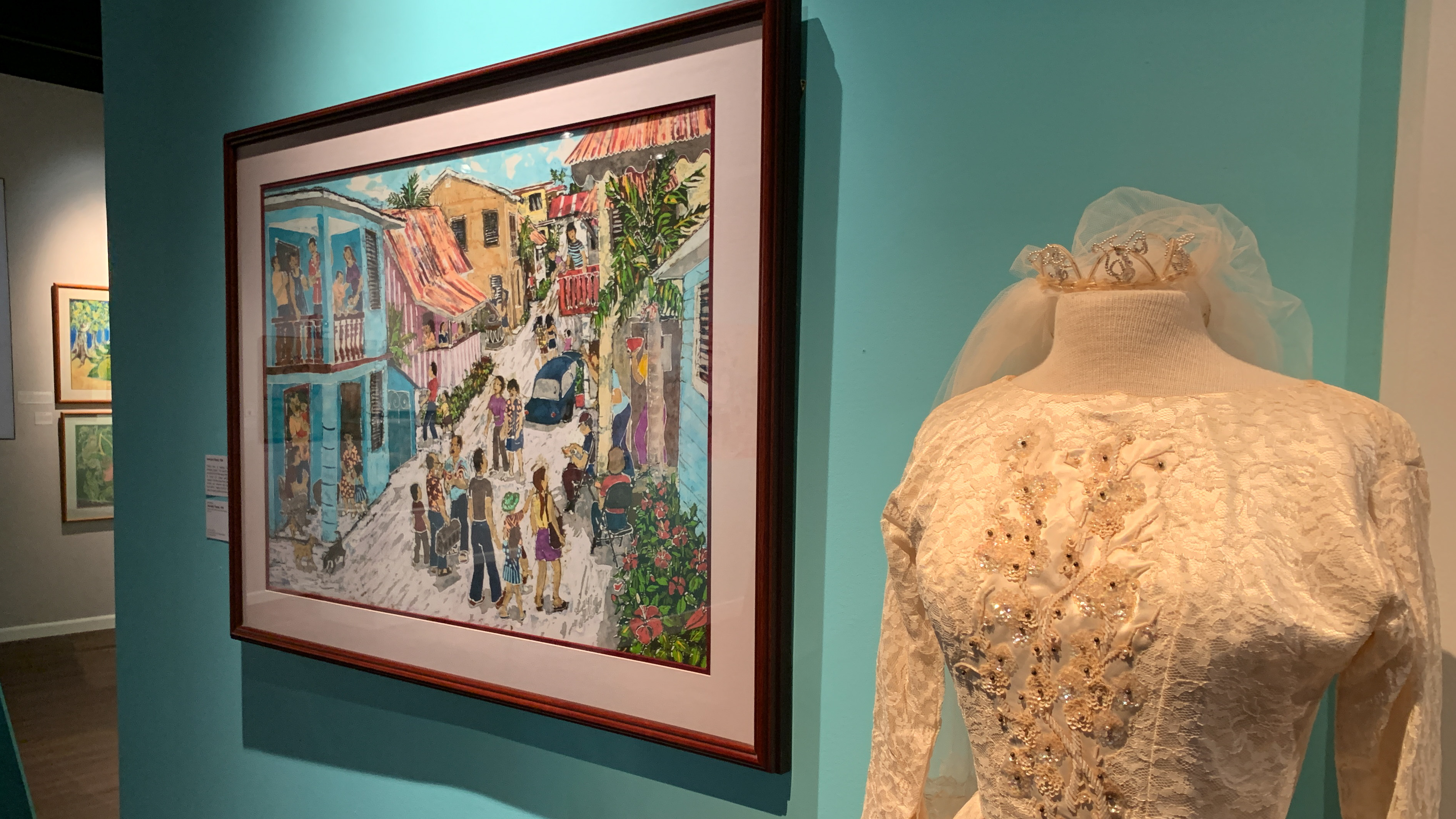
Inside the Guam Museum, 2019

In a speech at the groundbreaking, Governor Eddie Calvo stated that the Guam Museum would lead to the economic revitalization of Hagåtña, including the Plaza de España, "This will re-energize our capital city to its greatest heights." Calvo also promised that Guamanian historical artifacts housed in the Philippines, Europe and Hawaii will return to Guam and be added to the museum. The Governor also paid tribute to two recently deceased Guamanian historians - the museum's former director, Tony Palomo, who died on February 1, 2013, and Dr. Dirk Ballendorf, the former director of the Micronesia Area Research Center at the University of Guam, who died on February 4, 2013.

Other dignitaries in attendance at the groundbreaking ceremony included First Lady of Guam Christine Calvo, Speaker Judith Won Pat, Vice Speaker B.J. Cruz, Mayor of Hagåtña John Cruz, Archbishop Anthony Sablan Apuron, and chairman of the Guam Visitors Bureau Mark Baldyga.

The new museum caused some controversy in Guam. Critics cited the Museum's high cost and location, which will occupy 27 percent of an existing Hagåtña city park, as causes for concern. The museum is also located in a zone with a history of flooding, which could damage the collection. Chairman of Guam Museum Foundation, Monte Mesa, noted that planners had remedied the flooding concerns. The museum is constructed on elevated ground and the institution's most important artifacts will be housed on the three-story building's upper floors, out of reach of potential floodwater.

=== Permanent museum opened (2016) ===
The Guam Museum officially opened on November 4, 2016 under the Guam Department of Chamorro Affairs. Its collection includes more than 250,000 artifacts, documents, and photographs. However, the permanent collection, "I Hinanao-Ta Nu Manaotao Tåno’-I CHamoru Siha: The Journey of the CHamoru People," opened in 2018. The building includes a ground floor exhibition gallery, multipurpose room, and indoor theater. The Museum also hosts the outdoor Movies At The Museum in Skinner Plaza.
