= Marguerite Stitt Church =

American politician (1892–1990)

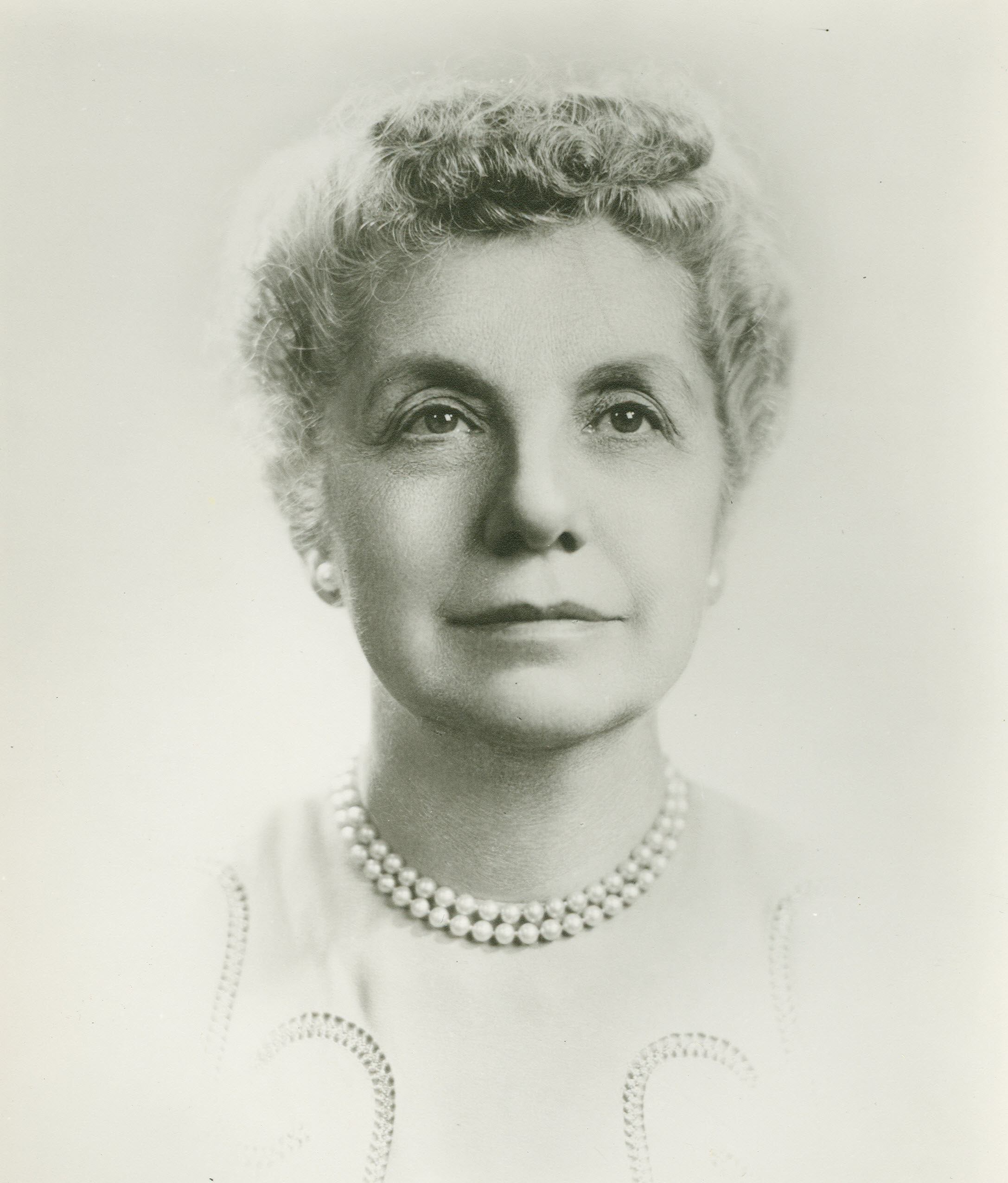

Member of the U.S. House of Representatives from Illinois's 13th district
- In office January 3, 1951 – January 3, 1963
- Preceded by: Ralph E. Church
- Succeeded by: Donald Rumsfeld

Personal details
- Born: Marguerite Stitt; September 13, 1892 New York, New York, U.S.
- Died: May 26, 1990 (aged 97) Evanston, Illinois, U.S.
- Party: Republican
- Spouse: Ralph E. Church (m. 1918; died 1950)
- Children: 3
- Education: Wellesley College; Columbia University

Marguerite Stitt Church (September 13, 1892 – May 26, 1990) was an American psychologist and politician who represented Illinois' 13th congressional district as a Republican from 1951 to 1963.

== Early life and education ==
Church was born in 1892 to William J. and Adelaide Stitt (née Forsythe). She grew up in the New York City metropolitan area where she attended St. Agatha School. She traveled abroad with her parents each summer, which helped develop her interest in foreign countries. In 1914, Church graduated from Wellesley College where she earned a B.A. in psychology, with a minor in economics and sociology. She went on to get a Master's degree from Columbia University in 1917.

== Career ==
After graduating from Columbia, Church became a consulting psychologist for the State Charities Aid Association of New York City for one year. When her husband, Ralph Church, was first elected as a U.S. Representative in 1934, she became closely involved with his work. In March 1950, Ralph died of heart failure during a House committee hearing. Church ran for her husband's now vacant seat and was elected in November 1950 by the highest majority ever had by a candidate from Evanston. Church voted in favor of the Civil Rights Acts of 1957 and 1960, as well as the 24th Amendment to the U.S. Constitution.

== Personal life ==
On December 21, 1918, she married Ralph E. Church. The couple settled in Evanston, Illinois and had three children: Ralph Jr., William, and Marjory. She died in Evanston on May 26, 1990.

Church is buried in Memorial Park, Skokie, Illinois.

== See also ==
- Women in the United States House of Representatives

U.S. House of Representatives
Preceded by Ralph E. Church	U.S. Representative of Illinois's 13th congressional district 1951–1963	Succeeded by Donald Rumsfeld
