= Criticism of Disney theme parks =

Over the years, Disney theme parks, under the Disney Experiences or more commonly known as Disney Parks, one of the three major divisions of the Walt Disney Company, have faced criticism and controversy on a range of issues, including animal cruelty at Disney's Animal Kingdom, overcrowding problems, and shark fin soup. Separately, Disneyland Resort has faced criticism for a ban on same-sex dancing from 1957 to 1989, Disney PhotoPass professional photography service, Hong Kong Disneyland Resort for fingerprinting visitors and food safety violations, and Walt Disney World Resort for a variety of issues.

== Cruelty to animals ==
Animal welfare groups have criticized Disney for their care of, and procedures for, wild animals at Disney's Animal Kingdom.

In 1989, Disney was charged with sixteen state and federal counts of animal cruelty relating to the abuse of vultures and other birds at its Discovery Island zoological park. According to investigators, employees shot at hawks, clubbed vultures to death with a stick, and destroyed nests and eggs. The park's supervisor supposedly sanctioned the abuses. Most striking was the death of fifteen vultures crammed into a tiny, overheated shed for days with limited food and water. Authorities also discovered 72 vultures confined in a windowless, airless shed, which legally speaking was only big enough for three vultures. Disney made a deal and in exchange for the dismissal of three federal charges, it pleaded guilty to a simple misdemeanor and agreed to pay a total of $95,000 to various institutions.

=== Overcrowding problems ===
Just before the Animal Kingdom theme park grand opening, the park was criticized for overestimating the daily capacity limit. The problem became apparent on the charity preview day on September 4, 2005, when 30,000 locals visited the park. This event turned out to be a disaster, because there were too many guests for the park to accommodate. Wait times at fast food outlets were at least 45 minutes in length, and wait times at rides were two hours in length.

During the Chinese New Year 2006, many visitors arrived at the park in the morning bearing valid tickets but were refused entry, because the park was already at capacity. Disgruntled visitors attempted to force their way into the park or gain access by climbing over the barrier gates. Disneyland management was forced to revise their ticketing policy and designated future periods close to Chinese public holidays as 'special days' during which admission would only be allowed through a date-specific ticket.

=== Shark fin soup controversy ===
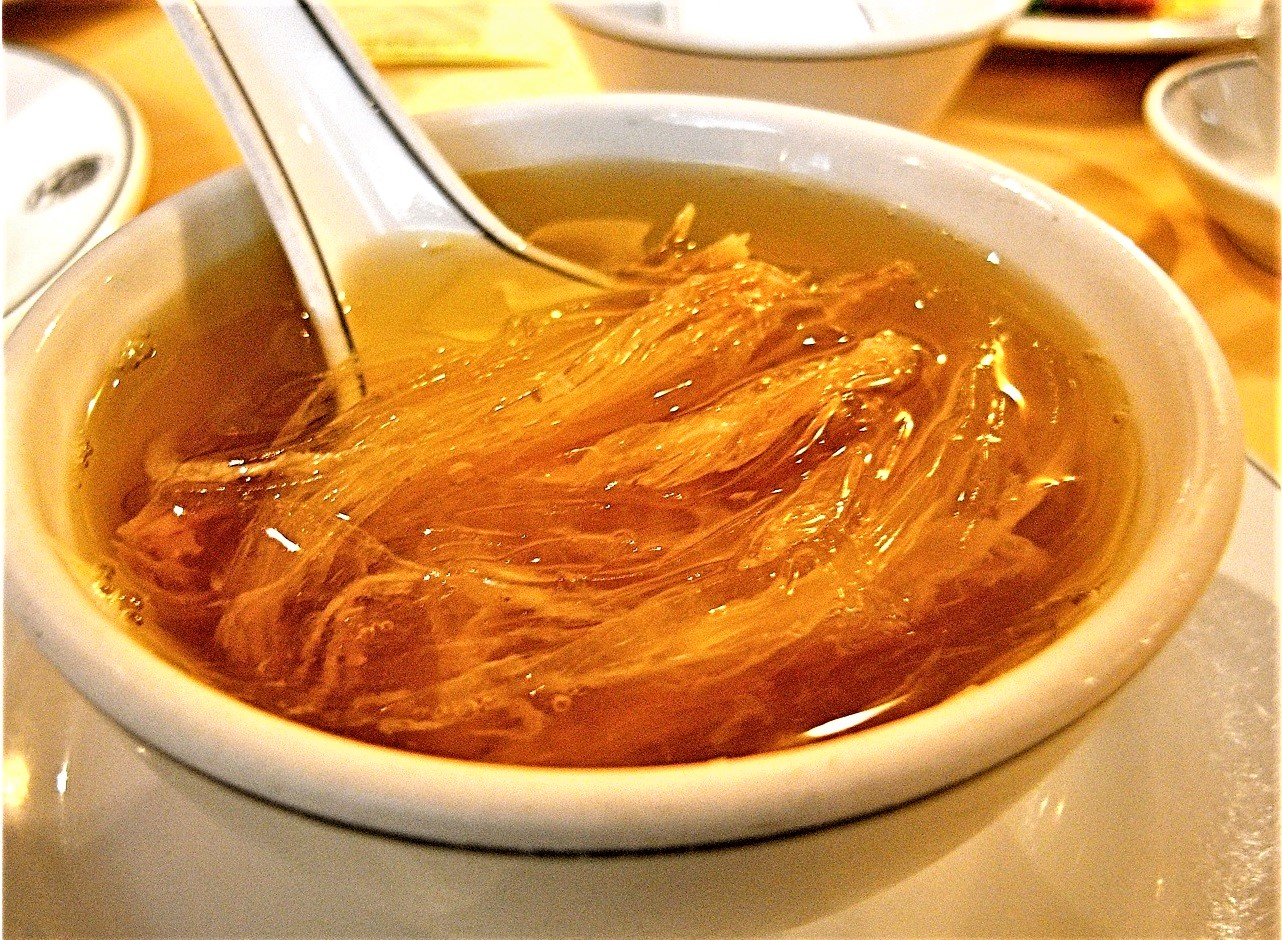
shark fin soup

Disney originally planned to serve shark fin soup, a traditional Chinese delicacy, at wedding banquets. Animal rights groups protested in June 2005, citing the declining shark population in global waters and the cruel methods sometimes used of cutting the fin and discarding live sharks back into the sea.

At first, Disney removed shark fin soup from its menu, but said that it would still offer the soup if their clients insisted on having it served at their wedding. They said they would distribute leaflets about shark conservation in order to discourage the choice.

However, after constant and continuous pressure from both environmental groups and animal welfare groups, as well as shareholders concerned about the company's image, Disney announced on June 24, 2005, that shark fin soup will not be served at all, because, according to their press release, "After careful consideration and a thorough review process, we were not able to identify an environmentally sustainable fishing source, leaving us no alternative except to remove shark fin soup from our wedding banquet menu".

=== Other controversies ===
Fish around Ma Wan died as a result of land reclamation during the building of Hong Kong Disneyland Resort.

== Disneyland Resort ==
=== Al Lutz's Disneyland reports ===
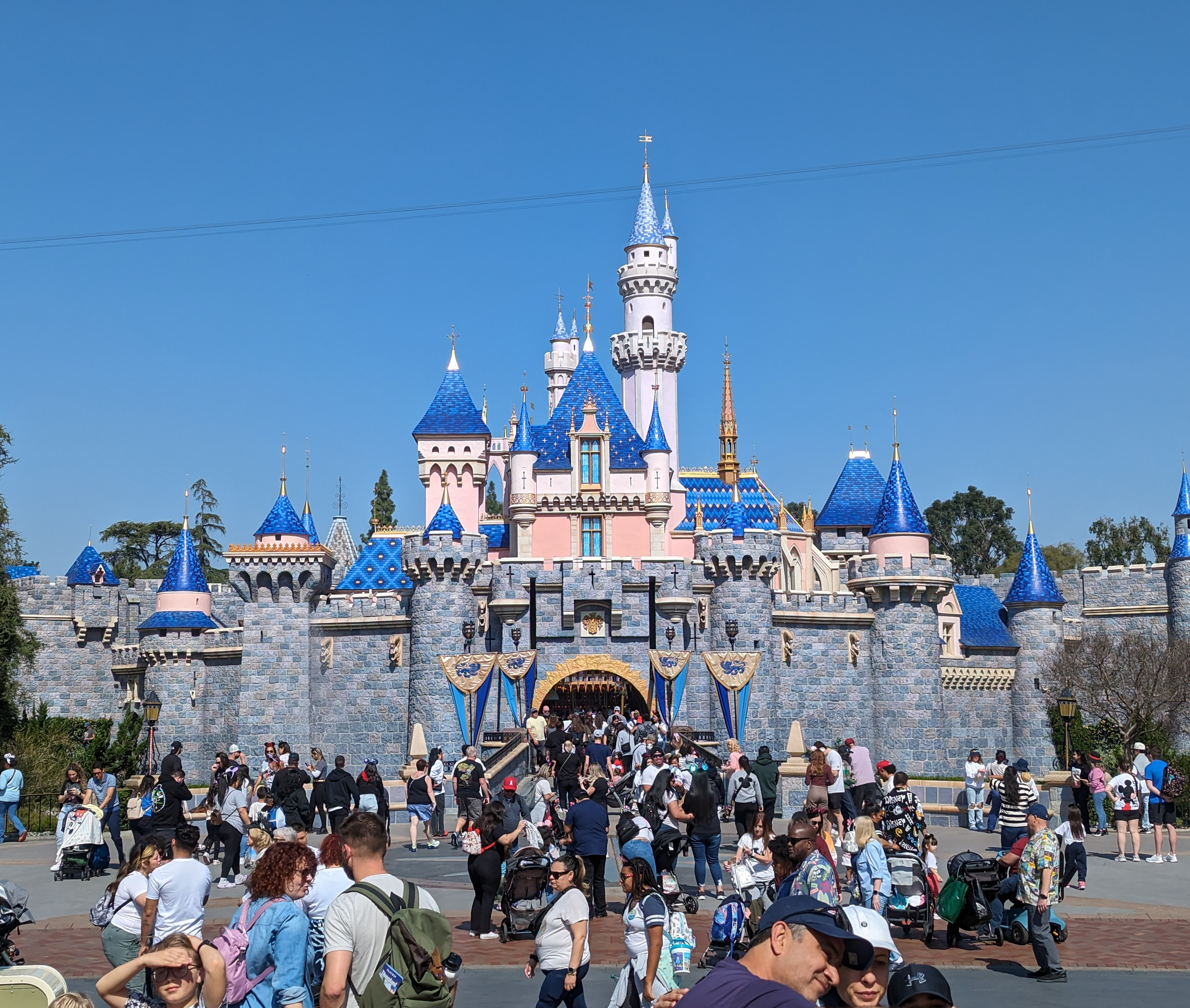
Disneyland in Anaheim, California, in February 2024

Al Lutz, who had written about Disney since the 1990s, often wrote about a perceived decline in value and quality at Disney's theme parks, including Disneyland and its neighboring park Disney California Adventure which opened in 2001. Much of his criticism was directed at Paul Pressler, the one-time president of Disneyland who later was named chairman of Walt Disney Parks and Resorts, and Cynthia Harriss, Pressler's successor as Disneyland's president. From 1996 to 2002, Lutz maintained a set of sarcastic Web pages called Promote Paul Pressler!, with the stated goal of "getting current Disneyland Resort President Paul Pressler promoted to a new job somewhere else within The Walt Disney Company!"

=== Ban on same-sex dancing ===
Between 1957, when the park first allowed dancing, and 1985, Disneyland only allowed pairs of men and women to dance on stage, barring single, group (with the exception of children), and same sex couples. Disney claimed the policy had been put in place for crowd control and to avoid harassment of women, but also stated that it was "because some patrons might have found dance partners of the same sex offensive." Teenage gay rights activist Andrew Ross Exler (now having the legal mononame Crusader) decided to dance with his friend Shawn Elliott on "Date Night," September 13, 1980, to protest the policy after his lesbian roommate was told she couldn't dance with other girls. The security guards responded to their "homosexual fast-dancing" by ejecting them from the park after telling Exler and Elliott, "This is a family park," and "There is no room for alternative lifestyles here."

Exler, who had notified the media before Date Night, sued Disney in court for discrimination under California's Unruh Civil Rights Act and won the suit in 1984; however, Disney later claimed that the ruling only applied to Exler and Elliott and continued to enforce the ban, particularly for same-sex "slow" or "touch" dancing, resulting in another lawsuit later in the decade that forced Disney to rescind the unwritten slow-dancing policy in 1989.

=== Disney California Adventure ===
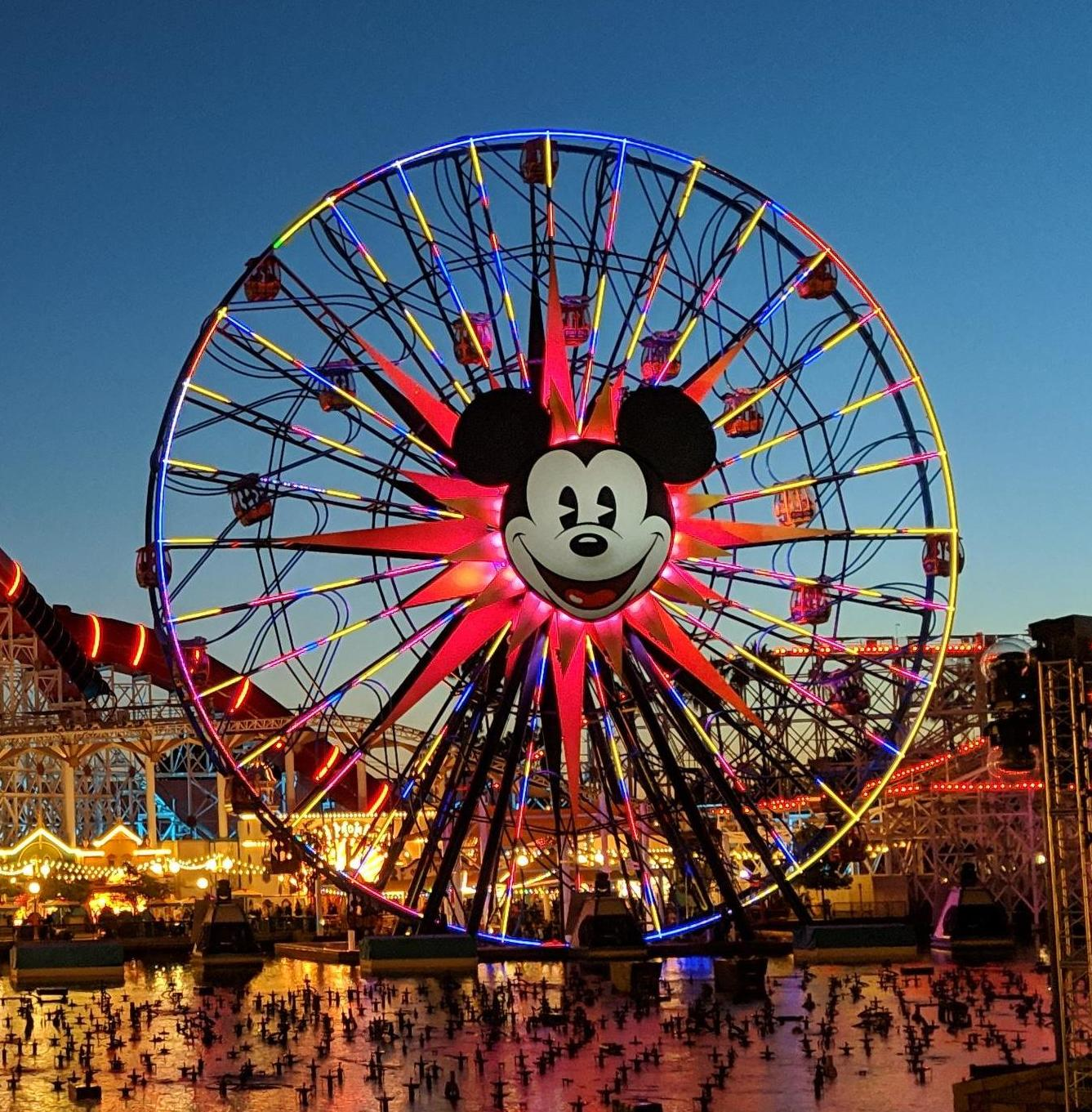
Disney California Adventure in May 2019

Disney California Adventure, originally named Disney's California Adventure Park until a name change in June 2010, was expected to draw large crowds when it opened in 2001. A January 14, 2001 article in the Los Angeles Times, "The most Jam-Packed Theme Park on Earth?" reported that, "Senior Disney officials acknowledge that there will be days when California Adventure will have to turn patrons away, particularly in the first weeks after the park opens, during spring break and again in the summer." The actual attendance was not close to the size that Disney expected for the park back in 2001. The reasons for this have been speculated. They may include bad word-of-mouth from early visitors discouraged future visitors, stating the park was lacking in Disney-quality attractions, and an estimated price tag of $600 million, with the park criticized for being built "on the cheap", with a small number of attractions and minimal theming. Otherwise, many guests complained that a single day admission ticket to Disney's California Adventure cost the same as a single day admission ticket to Disneyland, yet contained fewer attractions, shows, and entertainment.

Disney's chief executive officer, Bob Iger, went on record during the company's annual stockholder meeting on March 10, 2006, when someone asked about a potential third park being built in Anaheim. "We're still working to assure the second gate is successful", Iger said, referring to California Adventure. "In the spirit of candor, we have been challenged."

On October 17, 2007, The Walt Disney Company announced a multi-year, $1.1 billion expansion plan for Disney's California Adventure Park. Plans for the renovation and expansion were put on display for park visitors inside the Blue Sky Cellar at the Golden Vine Winery. Disney listened to the public and several of the attractions which drew criticism from the public were removed in the multi-year, multibillion-dollar redesign and expansion of Disney's California Adventure. Other rides were redesigned or replaced with a larger focus on Disney characters and stories.

On May 28, 2010, it was announced through the Disney Parks Blog that the park would also be receiving a name change, to Disney California Adventure, as well as a new logo. The new name took effect on June 11, 2010, appearing on park maps and banners, but it was first used in a commercial promoting Disney's World of Color a few days prior. World of Color premiered on June 11, 2010, as part of Disney's Summer Nighttastic.

== Disney's PhotoPass ==
Disney's PhotoPass is a professional photography service offered at Disney theme parks, water parks, and resorts. Photographers positioned at locations in the theme parks, dining events at the resorts, and at the Bibbidi Bobbidi Boutique at Downtown Disney are linked to a free card containing a unique serial number. Guests can view or purchase PhotoPass pictures at locations in the parks (generally near the park entrance) or online by registering the card's number.

Customers have complained about the difference in advertised prices, particularly of Photo CD products, and the actual cost. Disney has responded that advertised specials apply only to products purchased at the parks and do not apply to the website.

== Walt Disney World Resort ==
=== Disney's Animal Kingdom ===
Even in the planning stages, various Florida based animal rights groups and PETA did not like the idea of Disney creating a theme park where animals were held in captivity. The groups protested, and PETA tried to convince travel agents not to book trips to the park. A few weeks before the park opened, a number of animals died due to accidents. The United States Department of Agriculture viewed most of the cases and found no violations of animal-welfare regulations. On opening day, the Orange County Sheriff's office sent about 150 deputies in fear that there might be a large protest, but only 24 protesters showed up. The protest lasted two hours, and there were no arrests.

One year after the park opened and before the Disney World Millennium Celebration, The Animal Rights Foundation of Florida complained that a New Millennium's Eve fireworks show could upset the animals. A USDA inspector came to the park to find no problems with launching low-noise fireworks half a mile away.

=== Disney's Wide World of Sports Complex ===
A former baseball umpire and an architect alleged that they approached The Walt Disney Company in 1987 with plans for a sports complex and that Wide World of Sports, which opened 10 years later, was heavily based on their designs. Disney claimed that, while the designs had some similarities, the complex was also similar to numerous other sporting facilities, and the concept of a sports park was too generic for any one group to claim ownership. The two men, represented in part by noted attorney Johnnie Cochran, sued Disney in Orange County civil court. In August 2000, a jury returned a verdict for the plaintiffs with damages in the amount of $240 million, a fraction of the $1.5 billion sought. Disney appealed the judgment, and settled out of court in September 2002 for undisclosed terms.

=== Miscellaneous ===
In 2017, The Walt Disney Company and two of its subsidiaries reached an agreement with the U.S. Department of Labor to pay $3.8M to 16,339 employees of Walt Disney Parks and Resorts U.S. Inc and Disney Vacation Club Management Corp. After Disney had started charging employees for their costumes, the income of many employees fell below the federal minimum wage. The resorts were also found to be in violation of overtime and payroll recordkeeping regulations.

=== Walt Disney World College Program ===
The Walt Disney World College Program is a U.S. national internship program operated by The Walt Disney Company, located at the Walt Disney World Resort. The Walt Disney World College Program recruits students (18 years and older) and all majors for a semester-long paid internship program working at the Walt Disney World Resort. Critics argue that Disney is using the program as a source of cheap labor, as interns do the same work as veteran employees, but at a significantly lower pay rate. In late 2007, a permanent Cast Member ran for president of the local union in Orlando. Part of his platform intended to get rid of the Disney College Program, claiming that the program "imports thousands of low-wage earners every year to work for Disney, depressing the local employment market and keeping wages down." Disney responded that the program is beneficial in the recruitment of cast members and that 8,000 workers out of 62,000 do not greatly impact operations. It has been criticized also for its lack of union representation and denial of insurance benefits by the company.

=== Wrongful death lawsuit ===
In October 2023, a patron of Walt Disney World Resort had a severe allergic reaction and died after eating at a restaurant on the Florida property. Her husband filed a wrongful death lawsuit in February 2024, alleging negligence as the couple had been assured her order would be free of allergens. Attorneys for Disney sought to dismiss the case, arguing that the patron had agreed to settle any disputes with arbitration when he signed up for a free trial of Disney+ and agreed to its terms and conditions. In August 2024, a Disney representative stated that as the resort restaurant "is neither owned nor operated by Disney", the Walt Disney Company should not be included in the lawsuit. On August 19, 2024, Josh D'Amaro, Chairman of Disney Experiences announced that Disney would "waive [their] right to arbitration", stating that, “At Disney, we strive to put humanity above all other considerations."

== Hong Kong Disneyland Resort ==
=== Fingerprinting ===
As at other Disney theme parks, visitors to Hong Kong Disneyland have their finger biometrics scanned at the entry gate. Visitors are not warned of the policy beforehand. Scanning is done of all visitors older than 10 years of age, and is used to associate ticket media with the person using it. The company claims that "the 50 sample points from the surface of a guest's finger ... do not contain sufficient information to recreate a fingerprint image." Nonetheless, forensic specialists note that the data collected are more than adequate to establish a positive identification.

=== Food safety panel ===
Officers from the Food and Environmental Hygiene Department, who were asked by Disney staff to take off their badges and caps in order to enter the park, left park visitors feeling very uneasy. The officers investigated a food-poisoning case in the park's restaurants. The chairman of Legco's food Safety panel, Fred Li, described the incident as shocking and called on the director of the department to take follow-up action against Disney. Hong Kong Disneyland says that what happened was inappropriate and has apologized for the incident. The Secretary for Justice has since said that the government did not have enough evidence to make a prosecution, thus dropping the case.
