= Doris F. Fisher =

American businesswoman (1931–2026)

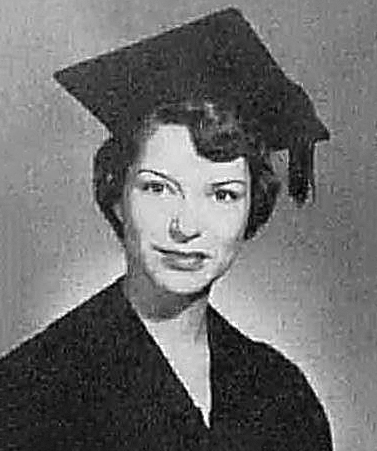
- University yearbook portrait, 1953
- Born: Doris Lee Feigenbaum; August 23, 1931; San Francisco, California, U.S.
- Died: May 2, 2026 (aged 94); San Francisco, California, U.S.
- Education: Stanford University
- Occupation: Businesswoman
- Known for: Co-founder of The Gap
- Spouse: Donald Fisher (m. 1953; died 2009)
- Children: Robert; William; John
- Parent: B. J. Feigenbaum

Doris Lee Feigenbaum Fisher (August 23, 1931 – May 2, 2026) was an American billionaire businesswoman who co-founded The Gap Inc. clothing stores with her husband, Donald Fisher, in 1969.

== Early life ==
Fisher was born in San Francisco, California, to Harvard-educated lawyer and California state legislator B. Joseph Feigenbaum and Dorothy Feigenbaum (née Bamberger) of New York, both Jewish. She had two siblings: Ann F. Rossi and Joseph L. Feigenbaum.

Doris attended Stanford University, graduating as one of the first women with a degree in economics. She and Donald were acquainted long before they married in July 1953. They had three sons together, 10 grandchildren, and 13 great grandchildren.

== Career ==
Fisher co-founded the Gap with her husband Don Fisher in 1969, which eventually became a $16 billion business with more than 3,500 stores worldwide. Doris and Don began by selling jeans and record albums at their first store on Ocean Avenue in San Francisco, expanding to open outlets in other cities. They focused on bringing in casual fashion of jeans, t-shirts, khakis, purses, and other items. They considered themselves equal partners. Fisher was the company’s merchandiser until 2003 and sat on the board until 2009. Doris invented the name the Gap, referring to the expression "generation gap", with the goal of enticing young consumers to their brand.

Their philosophy was to keep the stores well-organized by size and style, with lots of dressing rooms to try on clothing. In 1972 they decided to produce their own clothing lines. Their son, Robert J. Fisher, company director and former chairman, said that his father counted on his mother's “sense of style and taste.” This kind of concept caught on and the Fishers ended up growing their company into a major global brand. As of today, with more than 3,200 stores in their portfolio their company includes Gap, Banana Republic, Old Navy, Piperlime (now defunct) and Athleta.

She was named as one of the 100 Most Powerful Women by Forbes Magazine. She was a trustee of Stanford University, her alma mater.

== Political views ==
In 2019, it was revealed that Fisher, together with her sons Robert, William, and John, had donated nearly $9 million to Americans for Job Security, a non-profit group that opposed Barack Obama in the 2012 election. Fisher was on the board of KIPP (Knowledge Is Power Program), a U.S. network of college-preparatory charter schools, and was a co-founder of the KIPP Foundation in 2000.

== Personal life and death ==
Doris and Don Fisher were married in 1953. Their three sons – Robert, William, and John – continue to manage the business. She and her husband were inducted into the California Hall of Fame in 2011, as the sixth class.

She loaned the art collection she and her husband spent their lives acquiring, which consists of 1,100 works by 185 artists, including Wayne Thiebaud, Andy Warhol, Ellsworth Kelly, and Richard Serra, to the San Francisco Museum of Modern Art.

Fisher died in San Francisco on May 2, 2026, at the age of 94.
