= Robert J. Fisher =

American businessman (born 1954)

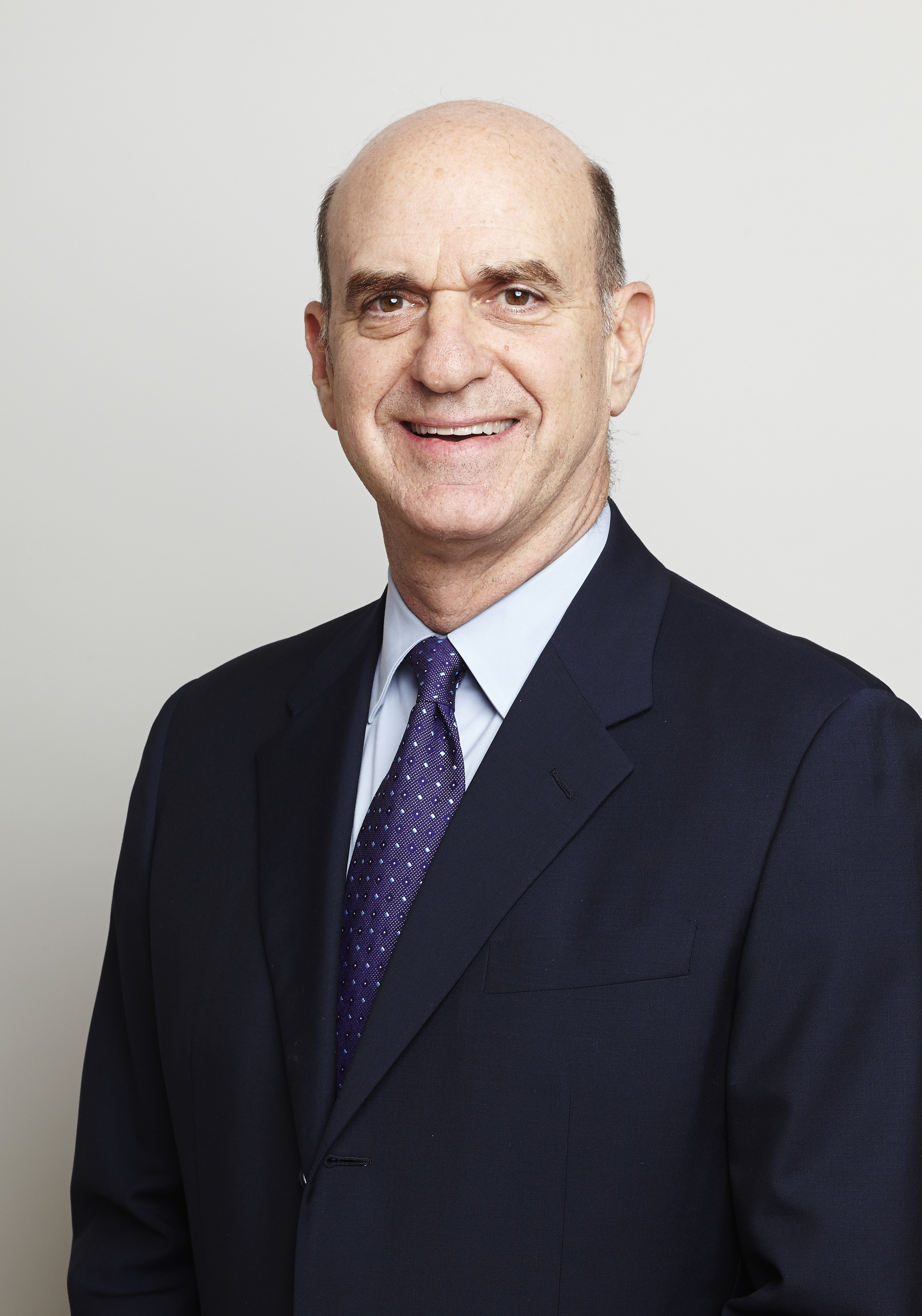
- Fisher in 2012
- Born: Robert Joseph Fisher; August 26, 1954 (age 72)
- Education: Princeton University (AB); Stanford University (MBA)
- Occupations: Chairman, The Gap Inc.
- Spouse: Elizabeth S. Fisher
- Children: 3
- Parent(s): Donald Fisher; Doris F. Fisher
- Family: William S. Fisher (brother); John J. Fisher (brother)

Robert Joseph Fisher (born August 26, 1954) is an American businessman who is the chairman of Gap Inc. and has been a director since 1990; he was previously chairman (2004–2007) and interim chief executive officer. The son of Gap Inc. co-founders Donald Fisher and Doris F. Fisher, he has been involved with the company for over 30 years.

== Early life and education ==
Fisher was born to a Jewish family, is the son of Doris Feigenbaum Fisher and Donald Fisher, the co-founders of Gap, Inc. He has two brothers: William S. Fisher and John J. Fisher. Fisher attended Phillips Exeter Academy and Princeton University, where he received a bachelor's degree. He is also a graduate of the Stanford University School of Business, from which he earned a Master of Business Administration.

== Career ==
Fisher's professional history with the company began when he became a Gap store manager in 1980. Following that, Fisher went to work at the company's corporate headquarters, where his roles increased in responsibility, with hands-on experience as a merchant and executive.

In 1989, Fisher was named president of Banana Republic. In 1990, he became a member of the Board of Directors of Gap Inc., and in 1992, he was named an executive vice president of Gap Inc. From 1993 to 1995, he served as chief financial officer of Gap Inc., at which time he was promoted to chief operating officer of the company. In 1997, he was named president of Gap brand, overseeing the adult, babyGap and GapKids businesses. In 2004, he was chairman of the board of directors.

In November 2019, Fisher replaced Art Peck of Gap Inc, as interim chief executive officer.

== Philanthropy ==
He is chair of the board of the San Francisco Museum of Modern Art.

== Environmental work ==
He is on the board of trustees for Conservation International as a member of the executive committee. He was on the board of the Natural Resources Defense Council for more than 20 years, and is on the organization's honorary board of trustees.

In 2009, he was appointed by Governor Arnold Schwarzenegger as the only public member of the Strategic Growth Council, Fisher was appointed by Governor Jerry Brown in 2014 as vice chair.

== Political donations ==
In 2019, it was revealed that Fisher had donated $1 million to a dark money group in opposition to Barack Obama two months prior to the 2012 presidential election.

Over the past decades, he also has contributed to many Democratic candidates and environmental campaigns.

== Personal life ==
He is married to Elizabeth S. Fisher and they have three children. They live in San Francisco.
