= Alex Mill =

American clothing brand

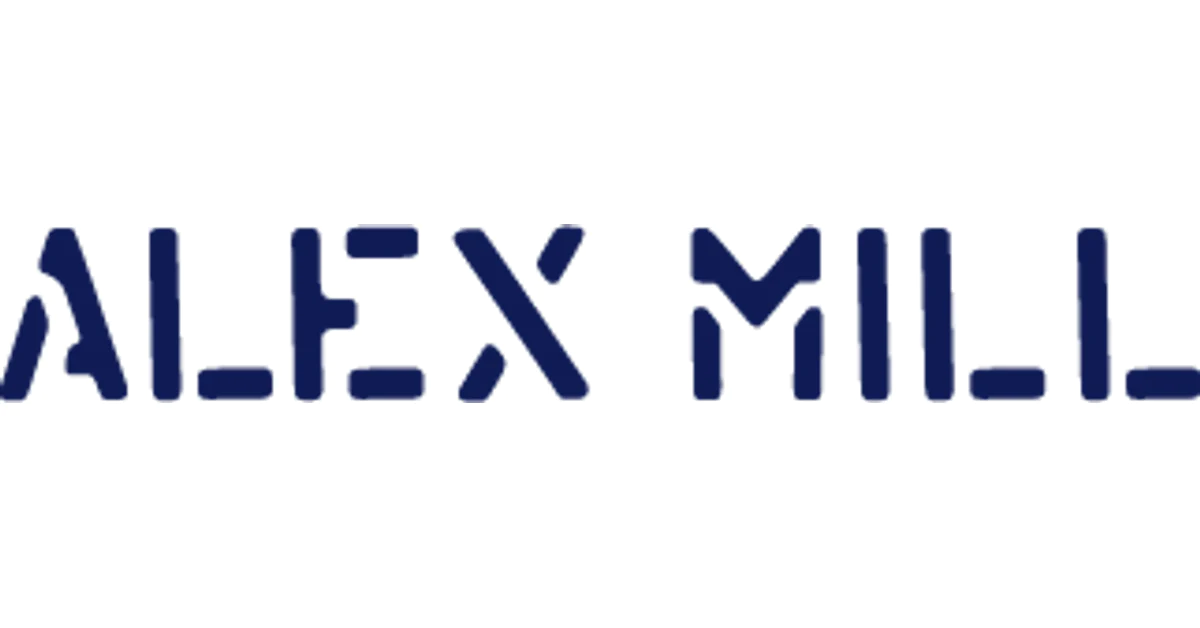
Logo

Alex Mill is an American clothing brand based in New York City. It was founded in 2012 by Alex Drexler; his father Mickey Drexler (former CEO of The Gap), is the CEO.

== History and description ==
Somsack Sikhounmuong is the creative director of its womenswear collection. When Mickey Drexler was CEO of J. Crew, he and Sikhounmuong had found success with the J.Crew sub-brand Madewell.

The brand has stores on Madison Avenue (at 87th Street) and on Mercer Street in Manhattan.

In 2023 Alex Mill collaborated with French footwear company Palladium for a capsule collection of two weatherproof winter boots.
