= John Fisher (businessman) =

American businessman (born 1961)

- Born: John Joseph Fisher; June 1, 1961 (age 65); San Francisco, California, U.S.
- Education: Princeton University (BA); Stanford University (MBA)
- Known for: Owner of the Athletics and former owner of the San Jose Earthquakes
- Spouse: Laura Meier Fisher
- Parent(s): Donald Fisher; Doris F. Fisher
- Family: Robert J. Fisher (brother); William S. Fisher (brother)

John Joseph Fisher (born June 1, 1961) is an American businessman. He is the principal owner of the Athletics of Major League Baseball and the Texas Rattlers of the Professional Bull Riders organization, and was previously the former owner of the San Jose Earthquakes of Major League Soccer from 2007 to 2026.

Fisher is the son of Gap founders Donald Fisher and Doris F. Fisher, inheriting his fortune from them, and amassing an estimated net worth of $3 billion. Along with his father, he was a part-owner of the San Francisco Giants, purchasing a stake in the team in 1992 as part of an investment group that prevented the team from relocating to the Tampa Bay area. In 2005, Fisher sold his stake in the Giants to buy the Athletics. His ownership of the team has been regarded as one of the worst in sports, as some argue that he deliberately mismanaged the team to reduce fan interest and move the team from Oakland to Las Vegas.

== Early life ==
Fisher is the son of Doris Feigenbaum Fisher and Don Fisher, the co-founders of Gap, and inherited his fortune from them. His family, which is Jewish, also includes two brothers: Robert J. Fisher and William S. Fisher. John is married to Laura Meier Fisher.

Fisher attended Phillips Exeter Academy and Princeton University, and graduated with an A.B. in history in 1983 after completing a 279-page-long senior thesis titled "Echoes of the Holocaust: Survivors in America Speak Out." He then attended graduate school at Stanford University School of Business, where he earned a master's degree in business administration.

== Career ==
Oakland Athletics Fans wearing fan-made green "SELL" t-shirts protest against Fisher's proposed relocation of the team to Las Vegas

After graduate school, Fisher took a job for a real estate company that did business with his parents' company, the Gap. The business was not successful and he became president of Pisces, the Fisher family's investment management company.

In 1992, John purchased a stake in the San Francisco Giants with his father, as part of a locally formed investment group's effort to prevent the franchise from relocating to the Tampa Bay area. His father's memoir describes John as having been anxious about rumors in the early 1990s that the Giants could move to Florida. He told his father: "I think we ought to try to put a deal together to keep the Giants here. Warren Hellman's interested in it, and so is Walter Shorenstein. We should be interested". The investment group's effort was ultimately successful and the Giants stayed in San Francisco, opening a new bayfront ballpark in 2000 (now known as Oracle Park). Fisher retained a small ownership stake in the Giants "so he could continue to monitor its financials", according to his father, until 2005, when he was required to sell it upon becoming the owner of the Oakland Athletics.

Fisher established a relationship with Lewis Wolff to jointly purchase several Fairmont hotels in San Francisco, which led to his investment in the Oakland Athletics of Major League Baseball. He also has stakes in the San Jose Earthquakes of Major League Soccer and Celtic, which competes in the Scottish Premiership.

Since 2022, Fisher has been the owner of the Texas Rattlers; one of ten bull riding teams in the Professional Bull Riders (PBR) Team Series, which runs in the summer and autumn in the United States. The Rattlers won the 2023 PBR Team Series Championship title.

=== Athletics ownership ===
Fisher has been the majority owner of the Athletics when he and Wolff closed on their joint purchase of the team in 2005, and is now also the managing general partner. In November 2016, Wolff sold his 10% share in the Athletics to Fisher, giving him full ownership of the team.

In April 2023, the Oakland Athletics announced a plan to build a new stadium on the Las Vegas Strip at the site of the former Wild Wild West Gambling Hall & Hotel casino near Interstate 15, near T-Mobile Arena, while also ending negotiations with the City of Oakland. The plan was announced after an agreement where Nevada provides $380 million in taxpayer money towards a new stadium for the team.

During a June 13, 2023 game against the Tampa Bay Rays, the crowd of 27,759 protested the relocation in an organized "reverse boycott" by wearing green "Sell" shirts, holding signs, and chanting "Sell the team!"

On September 26, 2024, at the end of the A's final game in Oakland, a giant collective chant of "Fuck John Fisher" broke out in the Oakland Coliseum. Fisher was not in attendance, and had not been to a game at the Coliseum for nearly two full seasons.

The Las Vegas move has been cited by various figures in sports media as evidence for Fisher being the worst owner in baseball, with some arguing that he deliberately mismanaged the A's to reduce fan interest and move the team. Former A's employees were also critical, with Wally Haas, the former team president, calling Fisher's moving of the team "unforgivable". During A's pitcher Trevor May's announcement that he was retiring, he stated in regards to Fisher, "Let someone who actually takes pride in the things they own own something. There's actually people who give a s--- about the game. Let them do it. Take Mommy and Daddy's money somewhere else, dork."

Defending the move, Fisher has stated a new stadium was necessary in order to be competitive in the free agent market, and claimed his ownership group did their very best to keep the team in the Bay Area, but had five new ballpark proposals turned down before looking into Las Vegas.

== Political views ==
After college, Fisher worked in the mailroom at the Republican National Committee and as a fundraiser for then-president Ronald Reagan and Vice President George H. W. Bush. Since then, he has had a long history of donating money to Republican politicians and causes, and sometimes to moderate Democrats. Fisher, along with his mother Doris F. Fisher and brothers William S. Fisher and Robert J. Fisher, donated nearly $9 million to a political action committee that opposed Barack Obama in the 2012 election. Congressional candidates who received donations from Fisher in 2023 include, Jodey Arrington, Michael Bennet, Mike Carey, Young Kim, Kyrsten Sinema, and Todd Young. That year, he also endorsed Republican Party candidate Doug Burgum for the 2024 US presidential election, donating the maximum legal amount to Burgum's campaign.
