= Paul Pressler =

Paul Pressler may refer to:

- Paul Pressler (businessman) (born 1956)
- Paul Pressler (politician) (1930–2024)
