= Forth & Towne =

American brand of clothing stores

- Industry: Retail
- Founded: 2005
- Defunct: 2007
- Fate: Owned by Gap Inc.
- Headquarters: United States
- Area served: Chicago; Atlanta; New York City

Forth & Towne is a defunct brand of clothing stores owned by Gap Inc., which owns Gap, Banana Republic, and Old Navy brands. It operated several test stores in the Chicago (Algonquin, Illinois; Aurora, Illinois; Skokie, Illinois; Schaumburg, Illinois), Atlanta, and New York City (West Nyack, New York) areas. Forth & Towne focused on women over 35 who grew up with the Gap brand, but have "lost touch" with it.

The name of the store refers to both the fact that it was Gap Inc.'s fourth retail clothing brand, and that the store design attempted to instill a feeling of community. The first Forth & Towne location to open was in West Nyack's Palisades Center; it opened on August 24, 2005.

In February 2007, Gap Inc announced that all 19 stores were slated for closure, and on June 15, 2007, the first store, in Schaumburg, closed. By the end of August, all Forth & Towne stores had ceased operating.

== Closure ==
The closure affected approximately 550 employees. Gap Inc. anticipated $40 million (~$58.1 million in 2024) of pre-tax expenses associated with the closure, over first and second quarters of fiscal year 2007. Any returns of Forth & Towne merchandise in areas affected by the closing were honored by Gap stores, Old Navy stores, and Banana Republic stores until December 31, 2007.

== See also ==
- Gap
- Old Navy
- Banana Republic
- Piperlime
- Athleta
