= Mickey Drexler =

American businessman and investor (born 1944)

Millard S. Drexler
- Born: August 17, 1944 (age 82); New York City, U.S.
- Education: University at Buffalo (BS); Boston University (MBA)
- Occupation: Businessman

Millard "Mickey" S. Drexler (born August 17, 1944) is an American businessman, who is the CEO of Alex Mill, and head of Drexler Ventures. He was formerly the CEO and chairman of J.Crew Group, as well as the CEO of Gap Inc.

== Early life and education ==
Mickey Drexler was born to Jewish parents in the Bronx. His mother died when he was 16. He studied at the Bronx High School of Science, City College of New York, and University at Buffalo. He later received an MBA from Boston University. He used to live in San Francisco, California but moved to New York to continue working for Gap Inc.

== Career ==
In the mid-1970s, Drexler was a merchandising vice-president at Abraham & Straus in Brooklyn, New York. He has also worked at Ann Taylor, Bloomingdale's, and Macy's. He was on Apple Inc’s board of directors from 1999 until 2015.

=== Gap Inc. ===
Drexler is often credited with Gap's meteoric rise during the 1990s. Prior to his involvement, Gap had been a relatively small chain selling private and public brands. Under Drexler the company made a dramatic shift to private label brand merchandise and expanded rapidly to become an iconic part of 1990s pop culture, such as "khakis, basics and casual Fridays". Television advertisements featuring songs such as "Mellow Yellow" and "Dress You Up in My Love" showcased the relaxed American casual look that defined the Gap brand. During his time at Gap Inc. he had worked alongside Steve Jobs, who was a board member of Gap Inc. at the time and a friend of Drexler.

On May 22, 2002, however due to a sales slump and ballooning debt, plus his management style which clashed with the Fisher family, Drexler was abruptly forced to announce his retirement by Gap founder Donald Fisher. Drexler stayed on as CEO until September 26, 2002, when Paul Pressler was named as his successor. Drexler was bitter about his ouster but it was validated when sales rebounded one month after his departure.

=== J.Crew Group ===
The J.Crew Group, an American clothing and accessories retailer based in New York City, was founded in 1983 with the launch of its catalog and expanded into brick-and-mortar retailing in 1989 with its first store at the South Street Seaport in New York City. J.Crew hired Drexler as chairman and CEO in 2003 after his abrupt departure from Gap. Applying similar strategies from Gap, Drexler sought to reposition the J.Crew brand as a truly upscale boutique. What was once a low-priced, American, dressy-casual brand became more an upscale, dressy-vintage American brand with "frills included".

On June 5, 2017, it was announced that Drexler would step aside as chief executive. He had been unable to stop a several year slide as consumer tastes changed. Drexler noted that "J.Crew raised prices and underwent expansion during years when consumers became more and more thrifty". On January 18, 2019, Drexler announced his retirement as chairman, but will remain a strategic advisor to the Office of the CEO and the board.

=== Alex Mill ===
As of 2021, Drexler is the CEO of Alex Mill, a clothing brand started by his son.

== In popular culture ==
Drexler has made a guest appearance in an episode of the AMC drama Breaking Bad called Confessions, in which he plays a car wash customer. Drexler said his scene took nine takes to film.
