= Peter Forbes =

Peter Forbes may refer to:

- Peter Forbes (actor) (born 1960), Scottish actor
- Peter Forbes (author), science writer and journalist
- Peter Forbes, 10th Earl of Granard (born 1957), British peer
- D. Peter Forbes (born 1940), political figure in New Brunswick, Canada
- Peter W. Forbes (1850–1923), California politician, born in Prince Edward Island, Canada
