= B. J. Feigenbaum =

American lawyer

Member of the California State Assembly from the 27th district
- In office January 2, 1933 – January 7, 1935
- Preceded by: Melvyn I. Cronin
- Succeeded by: Jefferson E. Peyser

Member of the California State Assembly from the 31st district
- In office January 3, 1927 – January 2, 1933
- Preceded by: Albert A. Rosenshine
- Succeeded by: C. C. Cottrell

Personal details
- Born: Bertram Joseph Feigenbaum; April 19, 1900 San Francisco, California
- Died: January 21, 1984 (aged 83)
- Party: Republican
- Spouse: Dorothy
- Children: 3, including Doris F. Fisher
- Relatives: Donald Fisher (son-in-law)
- Occupation: Legislator and lawyer

Military service
- Branch/service: United States Army
- Battles/wars: World War I

Bertram Joseph Feigenbaum (April 19, 1900 – January 21, 1984) was an American lawyer, who served in the California legislature. During World War I he served in the United States Army.

== Early and personal life ==
Feigenbaum was born on April 19, 1900, in San Francisco, California. He enlisted in the Army at the age of 18, to fight in World War I, and graduated from Harvard Law School at the age of 22. Feigenbaum married Dorothy, and they had three children: Ann, Doris, and Joseph.

== Public service ==
Feigenbaum was elected to the California State Assembly in the November 1926 general election, representing the 31st District. He was re-elected in 1928 and 1930, with all three elections being uncontested. He was elected to represent the 27th District in the 1932 election, and did not stand for election again.

In 1974, Feigenbaum became a founding trustee of the Cancer Prevention Institute of California. His daughter, Doris F. Fisher, later became a trustee of the same charity.
