= Sonia Syngal =

American-Canadian businessperson

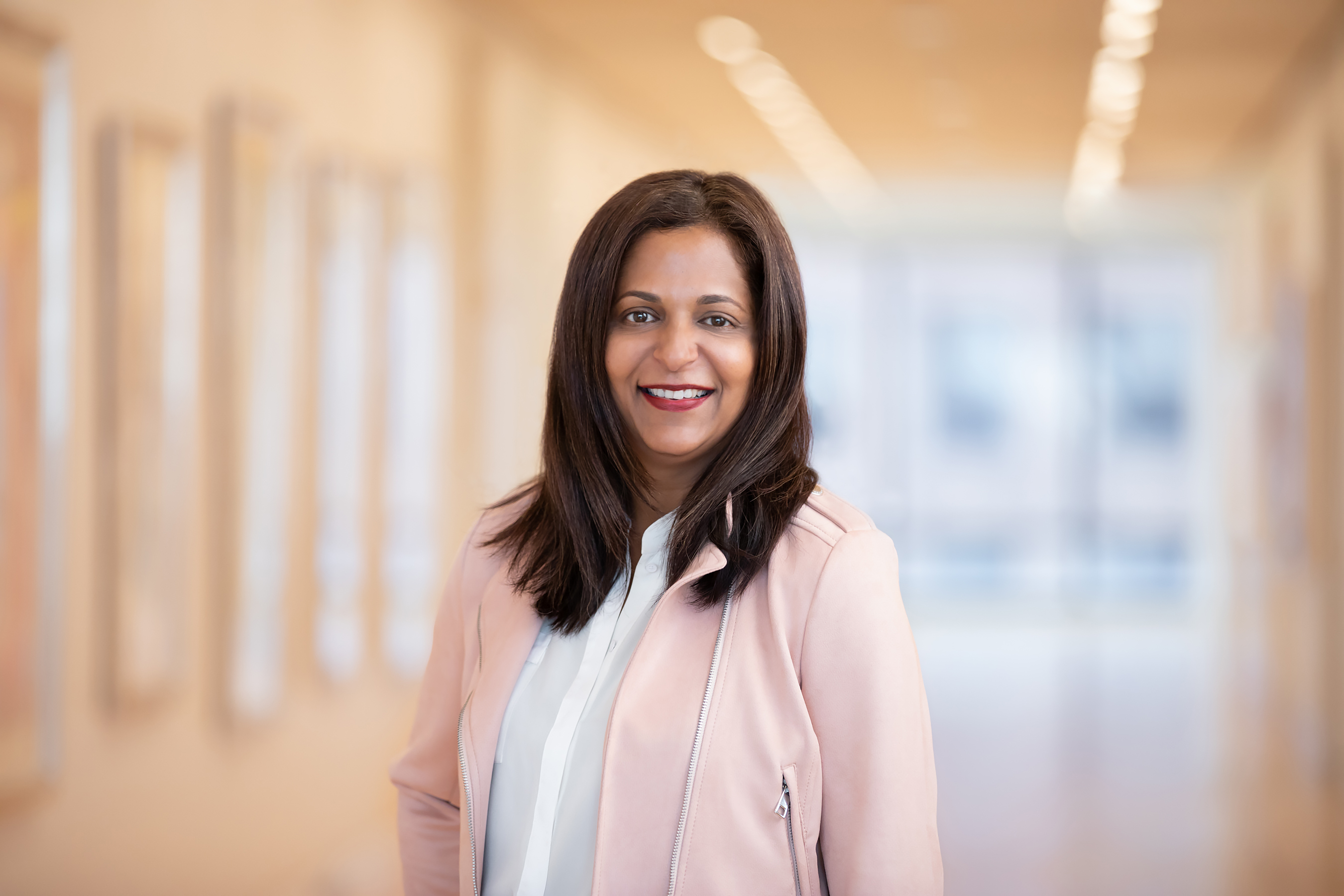
- Born: India
- Education: Kettering University; Stanford University
- Occupations: CEO, Gap Inc.
- Spouse: Joe McGrath
- Children: 2
- Parent(s): Sushma and Satya Syngal
- Website: www.gapinc.com

Sonia Syngal is an American businesswoman who was the chief executive officer (CEO) of Gap, Inc., the largest specialty apparel company in the U.S.

== Early life and education ==
Sonia Syngal, CEO, Gap Inc.

Syngal was born to Sushma and Satya Syngal in India, before her family moved to Canada at a young age. She later moved to the United States where she got her bachelor's degree in Mechanical Engineering from Kettering University in 1993. and her master's in Manufacturing Systems Engineering from Stanford University in 1995.

== Career ==
Syngal has held roles in several Fortune 500 companies, including 10 years at Sun Microsystems, where she led manufacturing operations, logistics and supply chain management, and six years at Ford Motor Co., where she held roles in product design, quality and manufacturing engineering.

Syngal joined Gap Inc. in 2004 and has worked in a number of leadership roles, including managing director for the company's Europe business, senior vice president for Gap Inc.'s International division and International Outlet division. She was executive vice president of global supply chain and product operations, responsible for managing Gap Inc.’s global supply chain and redefining its product-to-market model for its portfolio of brands.

From 2016 to 2020 Syngal led Gap Inc.'s largest brand, Old Navy. Under her tenure, the brand grew from $7B to $8B in sales, expanded its North American presence to more than 1,200 stores, scaled its ecommerce site to the no. 4 largest apparel site in the U.S., and built competitive omni-channel capabilities.

She was named CEO of Gap Inc. in March 2020. She led the company’s portfolio of lifestyle brands including Old Navy, Gap, Banana Republic, and Athleta, across all geographies and channels, with a team of more than 100,000 employees. At the time of her appointment as CEO in March 2020, Syngal was one of 37 women CEOs at Fortune 500 companies, and one of only three women CEOs of color.

Syngal has been a Steering Committee member of the Fashion Pact, a global coalition of companies in the fashion and textile industry committed to core environmental goals in three areas: stopping global warming, restoring biodiversity, and protecting the oceans.

Syngal stepped down from her CEO position and from Gap Inc.'s Board on July 11, 2022.

== Philanthropy ==
Syngal is a member of the Boys & Girls Clubs of America. Board of Governors and is on The Gap Foundation Board of Trustees.

== Accolades ==
In 2021 and 2020 Fortune named Syngal to "Fortune’s Most Powerful Women in Business” and in 2019, Fortune named Syngal among the "Top 10 Women to Watch" in its Most Powerful Women issue.

== Personal life ==
Syngal is married to Joe McGrath. They have two children.
