= Leland Richard Jacobson =

American politician

Member of the California State Assembly from the 27th district
- In office January 5, 1925 - June 5, 1928
- Preceded by: William Seward Scott
- Succeeded by: Melvyn I. Cronin

Personal details
- Born: February 9, 1890 San Francisco, California
- Died: June 5, 1928 (aged 38)
- Party: Republican
- Spouse: Opal
- Children: 1

Military service
- Branch/service: United States Army
- Battles/wars: World War I

Leland Richard Jacobson (February 9, 1890 – June 5, 1928) served in the California State Assembly for the 27th district from 1925 to 1928. During World War I he also served in the United States Army.

Jacobson died on June 5, 1928, while being operated on in the hospital for Appendicitis.
