= Art Peck =

American businessman

- Born: Arthur Peck; 1955 (age 70–71)
- Education: Occidental College; Harvard Business School
- Occupation: Businessman
- Title: Former CEO, Gap Inc.
- Term: 2015-2019
- Spouse: Married
- Children: 4

Arthur Peck (born 1955) is an American businessman, and was the CEO of Gap Inc., the American multinational clothing retailer from 2015 to 2019.

== Early life ==
Peck was born in 1955. He earned a degree from Occidental College in Los Angeles in 1977, followed by an MBA from Harvard Business School in 1979.

== Career ==
=== Boston Consulting Group ===
Peck worked for Boston Consulting Group from 1982 to 2005.

=== Gap Inc. ===
Peck joined Gap Inc. in 2005 after former CEO, Paul Pressler, hired him on as vice president of strategy and operations. In the mid-2000s, Peck was instrumental in steering Gap Inc.'s strategy, locally and internationally. He pitched the idea of franchising the retailer's foreign locations allowing local third parties to operate many of the businesses operations. He also helped launch Gap's Product Red campaign in 2006, a campaign that also partnered with other retailers such as Converse, Apple, and Nike.

He became CEO of Gap Inc. in February 2015.

Peck stepped down as CEO of Gap Inc. in November 2019 with a bonus estimated at $8 million.

== Personal life ==
Peck is married and has four children, two of whom work under the Gap Inc. umbrella.
