= Donald Fisher =

American businessman and philanthropist (1928–2009)

- Born: Donald George Fisher; September 3, 1928; San Francisco, California, US
- Died: September 27, 2009 (aged 81); San Francisco, California, US
- Education: University of California, Berkeley
- Occupation: Co-founder of The Gap Inc.
- Spouse: Doris Feigenbaum (m. 1953)
- Children: Robert; William; John
- Relatives: B. J. Feigenbaum (father-in-law)

Donald George Fisher (September 3, 1928 – September 27, 2009) was an American billionaire businessman and philanthropist. He co-founded the Gap Inc. clothing stores with his wife Doris F. Fisher.

== Early life and education ==
Fisher was born in San Francisco, California, to a Jewish family, the eldest of three sons of Aileen Fisher (née Emanuel) and Sydney Fisher, a cabinetmaker. He spent his childhood in the then-middle-class Sea Cliff neighborhood of San Francisco.

In 1951, Fisher graduated with a B.S. in business administration from the University of California, Berkeley. At Berkeley, he was a member of the Theta Zeta chapter of the fraternity Delta Kappa Epsilon. After graduating from Berkeley, he served as a U.S. Naval Reserve officer and then worked for his father as a cabinet-maker for L. & E. Emanuel Incorporated, a mill and cabinet making firm created by his great-grandfather that his mother inherited after her father died.

In the 1960s, Fisher started his own business renovating hotels and bought the Capitol Park Hotel in Sacramento fortuitously leasing some retail space to Levi Strauss & Co. which opened a showroom. Lou Romanello, who managed the Levi's store first, had the idea for a "Wall of Levi's" containing many different sizes, something that had not been done before in department stores of the time. After unsuccessfully trying to return a pair of Levi's jeans that did not fit, Fisher noticed that most department stores only carried a few sizes; he realized Romanello was onto something. Fisher invited Romanello to partner with him, but Romanello was loyal to Levi Strauss and turned him down. Fisher and his wife went on to open their first store carrying all sizes of jeans and named it The Gap after the "Generation Gap". The store sold Levi's jeans as well as records and tapes in order to capture the 12-to-25-year-old target market. In 1972, the Fishers launched the Gap label. The Gap was a resounding success and filed for an IPO in 1973. They went on to purchase Banana Republic, and also founded Old Navy which reached $1 billion in sales in four years. Fisher served as CEO until 1995, chairman of the board until 2004, and as company director and chairman emeritus until his death.

According to Forbes magazine, Fisher's net worth in 1999 was estimated to be US$4.3 billion.

Fisher was a founding Board Member of the Presidio Trust (the public corporation that runs the Presidio of San Francisco), a post nominated by the President of the United States. He married Doris Feigenbaum in 1953, and was a long-time member of Congregation Emanu-El in San Francisco. Their three sons continue to manage the business.

He was a non-executive director of Vodafone from 1999 to 2000.

== Philanthropy ==
Fisher was active in several public education causes, including being a major contributor to KIPP charter schools—a national network of low-income, high-achieving college preparatory public charter schools: he was the chairman of the board of trustees of the KIPP Foundation, the non-profit central organization of the KIPP network. He was also a contributor to Teach For America, GreatSchools.net, and EdVoice, a statewide coalition of California business leaders and others who support education reform. Fisher also served on the California State Board of Education. Fisher was a lifelong benefactor of his alma mater, Berkeley; he endowed two eponymous centers—the Fisher Center for Real Estate and Urban Economics and the Fisher Center for Business Analytics—at the Haas School. He donated to the school's building campaigns and to other campus causes, including the athletics department; Haas' Fisher Gate is named in his and his wife's honor. In 1986, the Haas School named him Alumnus of the Year, and, in 2007, he was honored as the Alumnus of the Year by Berkeley's California Alumni Association. Fisher and his family also donated a generous sum of money to Princeton University in 2006, and the Fisher Hall dormitory at Princeton's new residential college, Whitman College, is named for him. He has also donated to charter schools and museums in San Francisco, including the San Francisco Museum of Modern Art, and paid for public sculptures in San Francisco. He also contributed to many Bay Area Jewish causes, including the Jewish Community Center of San Francisco and the S.F.-based Jewish Community Federation and Endowment Fund.

== Art collection ==
Since founding the Gap in 1969, Fisher and his wife Doris began collecting contemporary Western art. In 1993, ARTnews Magazine declared Fisher one of the top ten art collectors in the world. His collection, largely housed at the Gap headquarters in San Francisco, includes comprehensive, career-spanning works by Andy Warhol, Alexander Calder and Roy Lichtenstein, Ellsworth Kelly, Gerhard Richter, Anselm Kiefer, Chuck Close, and Claes Oldenburg and Coosje van Bruggen.

On August 8, 2007, Fisher announced plans to build a 100,000-square-foot (9,300 m^{2}) museum in the San Francisco Presidio, tentatively named the Contemporary Art Museum of the Presidio, to house his art collection. The museum, if it had been built, would have been larger than the San Francisco Museum of Modern Art (SFMoMA). However, the plan engendered widespread skepticism and even outright antagonism among some historic preservationists in San Francisco.

In July 2009, Fisher announced that he and his wife were abandoning their efforts to build the museum at San Francisco's Presidio, stating "Doris and I will take some time to consider the future of our collection and other possible locations for a museum, which could include other sites within the Presidio and elsewhere." In September 2009, Donald and Doris Fisher decided to enter into a partnership with SFMOMA to display the collection.

== Awards and honors ==
- Philanthropy Hall of Fame
- 1991: Golden Plate Award of the American Academy of Achievement
- 2011: California Hall of Fame

== Death ==
One day after the San Francisco Chronicle article on the SFMOMA partnership, the Chronicle reported that Fisher died of cancer at home on Sunday morning, September 27, 2009.
