= California's 27th State Assembly district =

American legislative district

Current assemblymember
Esmeralda Soria; D–Fresno
- Population (2020): 512,647
- Demographics: 19.85% White; 3.13% Black; 66.77% Latino; 6.89% Asian; 0.43% Native American; 0.17% Hawaiian/Pacific Islander; 0.47% other; 2.30% remainder of multiracial

California's 27th State Assembly district is one of 80 California State Assembly districts. It is currently represented by Democrat Esmeralda Soria of Fresno.

== District profile ==
Prior to redistricting following the 2020 U.S. census, the district included part of San Jose in Santa Clara County. Since 2023, it includes portions of the San Joaquin Valley.

Fresno County – 14.70%

- Fresno – 11.33%

Madera County – 68.77%

- Madera – 100%

Merced County – 92.65%

- Los Banos – 100%
- Merced – 100%

== Election results from statewide races ==
Year	Office	Results
2021	Recall	No 75.3 – 24.7%
2020	President	Biden 70.6 – 27.6%
2018	Governor	Newsom 74.1 – 25.9%
2018	Senator	Feinstein 60.2 – 39.8%
2016	President	Clinton 77.8 – 17.3%
2016	Senator	Harris 54.2 – 45.8%
2014	Governor	Brown 78.6 – 21.4%
2012	President	Obama 76.4 – 21.5%
2012	Senator	Feinstein 79.1 – 20.9%

== List of assembly members representing the district ==
Due to redistricting, the 27th district has been moved around different parts of the state. The current iteration resulted from the 2021 redistricting by the California Citizens Redistricting Commission.

Assembly members	Party	Years served	Counties represented	Notes
R. C. Carter	Republican	January 5, 1885 – January 3, 1887	Solano	
Robert J. Currey	Republican	January 3, 1887 – January 7, 1889	Solano	
Jackson Fay Brown	Republican	January 7, 1889 – January 5, 1891	Solano	
John C. Wolfskill	Democratic	January 5, 1891 – January 2, 1893	Solano	
D. J. B. Schroebel	Democratic	January 2, 1893 – January 7, 1895	Calaveras	
Willis Dunbar	Republican	January 7, 1895 – January 4, 1897	Calaveras	
C. D. Fontana	Republican	January 4, 1897 – January 2, 1899	Calaveras	
Harvey S. Blood	Republican	January 2, 1899 – January 1, 1901	Calaveras	
William Chapman Ralston Jr.	Republican	January 1, 1901 – January 5, 1903	Calaveras	
Aubrey M. Lumley	Democratic	January 5, 1903 – January 7, 1907	Inyo, Tulara	
Peter W. Forbes	Democratic	January 7, 1907 – January 4, 1909	Inyo, Tulara	
George Washington Wyllie	Republican	January 4, 1909 – January 6, 1913	Inyo, Tulara	
Edward P. Walsh	Democratic	January 6, 1913 – January 4, 1915	San Francisco	
Nicholas J. Prendergast	Progressive	January 4, 1915 – April 14, 1920	San Francisco	Died in office.
Vacant		April 14, 1920 – January 3, 1921	San Francisco	
Patrick J. Gray	Republican	January 3, 1921 – January 8, 1923	San Francisco	
William Seward Scott	Republican	January 8, 1923 – January 5, 1925	San Francisco	
Leland Richard Jacobson	Republican	January 5, 1925 – June 5, 1928	San Francisco	Died in office before finishing his last term.
Vacant		June 5, 1928 – January 7, 1929	San Francisco	
Melvyn I. Cronin	Democratic	January 7, 1929 – January 2, 1933	San Francisco	
B. J. Feigenbaum	Republican	January 2, 1933 – January 7, 1935	San Francisco	
Jefferson E. Peyser	Republican	January 7, 1935 – January 2, 1939	San Francisco	
Albert Charles Wollenberg	Republican	January 2, 1939 – January 4, 1943	San Francisco	
Harrison W. Call	Republican	January 4, 1943 – January 6, 1947	San Mateo	
Richard J. Dolwig	Republican	January 6, 1947 – January 5, 1953	San Mateo	
Glenn E. Coolidge	Republican	January 5, 1953 – January 7, 1963	San Benito, Santa Cruz	
Leo Ryan	Democratic	January 7, 1963 – January 3, 1973	San Mateo	Elected to the House of Representatives.
Lou Papan	Democratic	January 8, 1973 – November 30, 1974	San Mateo	
John E. Thurman	Democratic	December 2, 1974 – November 30, 1982	Merced, Stanislaus	
Gary Condit	Democratic	December 6, 1982 – September 20, 1989	Merced, Stanislaus	Resigned from the State Assembly after winning special election in Congress.
Vacant		September 20, 1989 – February 1, 1990	Merced, Stanislaus	
Sal Cannella	Democratic	February 1, 1990 – November 30, 1992	Merced, Stanislaus	Was sworn after winning special election to fill vacant seat left by Gary Condit.
Sam Farr	Democratic	December 7, 1992 – June 16, 1993	Monterey, Santa Cruz	Resigned from the State Assembly after winning a special election for the 17th congressional district.
Vacant		June 16, 1993 – November 14, 1993	Monterey, Santa Cruz	
Bruce McPherson	Republican	November 14, 1993 – November 30, 1996	Monterey, Santa Cruz	Was sworn in after winning a special election for a vacant seat left by Sam Farr.
Fred Keeley	Democratic	December 2, 1996 – November 30, 2002	Monterey, Santa Cruz	
John Laird	Democratic	December 2, 2002 – November 30, 2008	Monterey, Santa Cruz, Santa Clara	
Bill Monning	Democratic	December 1, 2008 – November 30, 2012	Monterey, Santa Cruz, Santa Clara	
Nora Campos	Democratic	December 3, 2012 – November 30, 2016	Santa Clara	
Ash Kalra	Democratic	December 5, 2016 – November 30, 2022	Santa Clara	
Esmeralda Soria	Democratic	December 5, 2022 – present	Fresno	

== Election results (1990–present) ==
=== 2024 ===
2024 California State Assembly 27th district election
Primary election
Party	Candidate	Votes	%
Republican	Joanna Garcia Rose	29,457	50.9
Democratic	Esmeralda Soria (incumbent)	28,402	49.1
Total votes		57,859	100.0
General election
Democratic	Esmeralda Soria (incumbent)	75,559	53.9
Republican	Joanna Garcia Rose	64,576	46.1
Total votes		140,135	100.0
Democratic hold			

=== 2022 ===
2022 California State Assembly 27th district election
Primary election
Party	Candidate	Votes	%
Democratic	Esmeralda Soria	20,395	40.1
Republican	Mark Nicholas Pazin	17,801	35.0
Republican	Amanda Fleming	8,541	16.8
Democratic	Mike Karbassi	4,107	8.1
Libertarian	Randall Pellissier (write-in)	4	0.0
Total votes		50,848	100.0
General election
Democratic	Esmeralda Soria	45,721	51.3
Republican	Mark Nicholas Pazin	43,335	48.7
Total votes		89,056	100.0
Democratic hold			

=== 2020 ===
2020 California State Assembly 27th district election
Primary election
Party	Candidate	Votes	%
Democratic	Ash Kalra (incumbent)	66,324	75.7
Republican	G. Burt Lancaster	21,323	24.3
Total votes		87,647	100.0
General election
Democratic	Ash Kalra (incumbent)	127,772	72.6
Republican	G. Burt Lancaster	48,112	27.4
Total votes		175,884	100.0
Democratic hold			

=== 2018 ===
2018 California State Assembly 27th district election
Primary election
Party	Candidate	Votes	%
Democratic	Ash Kalra (incumbent)	51,825	99.5
Republican	G. Burt Lancaster (write-in)	285	0.5
Total votes		52,110	100.0
General election
Democratic	Ash Kalra (incumbent)	90,068	76.3
Republican	G. Burt Lancaster	27,990	23.7
Total votes		118,058	100.0
Democratic hold			

=== 2016 ===
2016 California State Assembly 27th district election
Primary election
Party	Candidate	Votes	%
Democratic	Madison Nguyen	27,453	34.3
Democratic	Ash Kalra	15,843	19.8
Republican	Van Le	11,726	14.7
Democratic	Andres Quintero	10,922	13.7
Democratic	Cong Thanh Do	4,869	6.1
Democratic	Darcie Green	4,769	6.0
Democratic	Esau Herrera	4,342	5.4
Total votes		79,924	100.0
General election
Democratic	Ash Kalra	71,696	53.2
Democratic	Madison Nguyen	63,048	46.8
Total votes		134,744	100.0
Democratic hold			

=== 2014 ===
2014 California State Assembly 27th district election
Primary election
Party	Candidate	Votes	%
Democratic	Nora Campos (incumbent)	34,799	69.5
Republican	G. "Burt" Lancaster	15,272	30.5
Total votes		50,071	100.0
General election
Democratic	Nora Campos (incumbent)	49,416	69.4
Republican	G. "Burt" Lancaster	21,779	30.6
Total votes		71,195	100.0
Democratic hold			

=== 2012 ===
2012 California State Assembly 27th district election
Primary election
Party	Candidate	Votes	%
Democratic	Nora Campos (incumbent)	34,217	70.6
Republican	Roger F. Lasson	14,238	29.4
Total votes		48,455	100.0
General election
Democratic	Nora Campos (incumbent)	91,816	77.6
Republican	Roger F. Lasson	26,461	22.4
Total votes		118,277	100.0
Democratic hold			

=== 2010 ===
2010 California State Assembly 27th district election
Party	Candidate	Votes	%
Democratic	Bill Monning (incumbent)	102,124	66.8
Republican	Linda "Ellie" Black	50,831	33.2
Total votes		152,955	100.0
Democratic hold			

=== 2008 ===
2008 California State Assembly 27th district election
Party	Candidate	Votes	%
Democratic	Bill Monning	127,102	66.0
Republican	Robert Murray	48,107	25.0
Libertarian	Mark Hinkle	17,435	9.0
Independent	Rexford Keyes (write-in)	27	0.0
Total votes		192,671	100.0
Democratic hold			

=== 2006 ===
2006 California State Assembly 27th district election
Party	Candidate	Votes	%
Democratic	John Laird (incumbent)	99,530	70.1
Republican	Michael Morrison	42,411	29.9
Total votes		141,941	100.0
Democratic hold			

=== 2004 ===
2004 California State Assembly 27th district election
Party	Candidate	Votes	%
Democratic	John Laird (incumbent)	129,410	68.7
Republican	Jack D. Barlich	59,076	31.3
Total votes		188,486	100.0
Democratic hold			

=== 2002 ===
2002 California State Assembly 27th district election
Party	Candidate	Votes	%
Democratic	John Laird	77,212	61.4
Republican	Charles Clayton Carter	44,444	35.2
Libertarian	Gordon Donald Sachtjen	4,294	3.4
Total votes		125,950	100.0
Democratic hold			

=== 2000 ===
2000 California State Assembly 27th district election
Party	Candidate	Votes	%
Democratic	Fred Keeley (incumbent)	101,459	64.8
Republican	Charles Clayton Carter	44,804	28.6
Libertarian	David R. Bonino	5,201	3.3
Natural Law	Madeline De Joly	5,140	3.3
Total votes		156,604	100.0
Democratic hold			

=== 1998 ===
1998 California State Assembly 27th district election
Party	Candidate	Votes	%
Democratic	Fred Keeley (incumbent)	81,234	65.3
Republican	Phil H. Chavez	38,063	30.6
Libertarian	Dirk Walker Deardorff	5,021	4.0
Total votes		124,318	100.0
Democratic hold			

=== 1996 ===
1996 California State Assembly 27th district election
Party	Candidate	Votes	%
Democratic	Fred Keeley	86,099	56.9
Republican	Jim Davis	57,407	37.9
Natural Law	Sunshine W. McCarthy	7,786	5.1
Total votes		151,292	100.0
Democratic gain from Republican			

=== 1994 ===
1994 California State Assembly 27th district election
Party	Candidate	Votes	%
Republican	Bruce McPherson (incumbent)	66,995	49.6
Democratic	Bill Monning	64,309	47.6
Libertarian	O. Robert Welch	3,835	2.8
Total votes		135,139	100.0
Republican hold			

=== 1993 (special) ===
1990 California State Assembly 27th district special election Vacancy resulting from the resignation of Sam Farr
Party	Candidate	Votes	%
Republican	Bruce McPherson	48,323	49.9
Democratic	Gary Patton	42,896	44.3
Peace and Freedom	Susanne Espinoza	3,001	3.1
American Independent	Jerome "Jerry" McCready	2,664	2.7
Total votes		96,884	100.0
Republican gain from Democratic			

=== 1992 ===
1992 California State Assembly 27th district election
Party	Candidate	Votes	%
Democratic	Sam Farr (incumbent)	101,695	60.7
Republican	Susan Whitman	58,873	35.1
Peace and Freedom	David Lucier	7,050	4.2
Total votes		167,618	100.0
Democratic hold			

=== 1990 ===
1990 California State Assembly 27th district election
Party	Candidate	Votes	%
Democratic	Sal Cannella (incumbent)	48,324	51.2
Republican	Richard A. Lang	43,012	45.5
Libertarian	Roy Shimp	3,122	3.3
Total votes		94,458	100.0
Democratic hold			

=== 1990 (special) ===
1990 California State Assembly 27th district special election Vacancy resulting from the resignation of Gary Condit
Party	Candidate	Votes	%
Democratic	Sal Cannella	32,349	53.2
Republican	Richard A. Lang	28,507	46.8
Total votes		60,856	100.0
Democratic hold			

== See also ==
- California State Assembly
- California State Assembly districts
- Districts in California
