= Melvyn I. Cronin =

American politician

Member of the California State Assembly from the 25th district
- In office January 2, 1933 – January 4, 1942
- Preceded by: William B. Hornblower
- Succeeded by: Gerald P. Haggerty

Member of the California State Assembly from the 27th district
- In office January 7, 1929 – January 2, 1933
- Preceded by: Leland Richard Jacobson
- Succeeded by: B. J. Feigenbaum

Personal details
- Born: July 13, 1898 San Francisco, California
- Died: May 9, 1977 (aged 78) San Francisco County, California, U.S.
- Party: Democratic
- Spouse: Lorena Mural Carley
- Children: 2

Melvyn I. Cronin (June 13, 1898 – May 9, 1977) was a United States politician, lawyer, and judge.

Cronin was born in San Francisco in 1898 and worked in the city's Park and Recreation Department where as a youth he taught baseball to his cousin Joe Cronin of later Boston Red Sox fame. He graduated from St. Ignatius College, later the University of San Francisco, with a degree in law and started a partnership with controversial lawyer Vincent Hallinan. During World War I he served in the United States Army. He was later a member of the California State Assembly for the 27th and 25th district, but resigned from the California State Assembly on January 4, 1942.

From 1953 to 1977, he was a Judge of the California Superior Court, and served in San Francisco as Judge of the Juvenile Court under the Superior Court of California. He was concurrently a member of the California Judicial Council.

He died in San Francisco County in 1977, aged 78.
