= C. C. Cottrell =

American politician (1895–1980)

Member of the California State Assembly from the 31st district
- In office January 2, 1933 - January 2, 1939
- Preceded by: B. J. Feigenbaum
- Succeeded by: M. G. Del Mutolo

Personal details
- Born: February 19, 1895 San Jose, California
- Died: February 1, 1980 (aged 84) California
- Party: Republican
- Children: 2

Military service
- Branch/service: United States Army
- Battles/wars: World War I

Clifton Carlyle Cottrell (February 19, 1895 – February 1, 1980) served in the California State Assembly for the 31st district from 1933 to 1939. During World War I he served in the United States Army.
