= Cynthia Harriss =

American retail and tourism industry executive

Cynthia Harriss is an American retail and tourism industry executive, notable for her senior roles with Gap Inc. and The Walt Disney Company.

== Biography ==
=== Early life and career ===
Harriss was born in Indiana and received a bachelor's degree from St. Louis University in Missouri. Harriss then spent 19 years in a variety of marketing and operations roles at the Paul Harris Stores, a women's clothing chain.

=== The Walt Disney Company ===
Harriss joined The Walt Disney Company in 1992 and held a variety of senior positions, including senior vice president of park operations at Disneyland and senior vice president of stores for the Disney Store chain. Harriss also served as president of Disneyland Resort, where she managed the Disneyland and Disney California Adventure Park theme parks as well as the resort's hotels and retail operations.

In 2000, Harriss received the Tree of Life Award for outstanding community service from the Jewish National Fund.

=== Gap Inc. ===
From February 2004 until May 2005, Harriss served as president of Gap Inc.'s Outlet division. In this role, Harriss oversaw Gap Inc.'s three outlet chains: Banana Republic Factory Stores, Gap Outlet and Old Navy Outlet. Harriss was then appointed president of Gap Inc.'s namesake chain of apparel stores, overseeing the Gap brand's operations, including its adult line as well as the brand's GapKids, babyGap and gapbody businesses. She resigned from this position in February 2007. Marka Hansen, former president of Gap Inc.'s Banana Republic brand, succeeded Harriss as president.
