= 2022 California Proposition 30 =

Proposition 30
- November 8, 2022
- Tax on Income Above $2 Million for Zero-Emissions Vehicles and Wildfire Prevention Initiative

Results
Choice	Votes	%
Yes	4,560,488	42.37%
No	6,203,810	57.63%
Valid votes	10,764,298	96.57%
Invalid or blank votes	382,322	3.43%
Total votes	11,146,620	100.00%
Registered voters/turnout	21,940,274	50.8%

Yes
60–70%
50–60%
No
80–90%
70–80%
60–70%
50–60%

Proposition 30 is a California ballot proposition that appeared in the general election on November 8, 2022. The measure was defeated. The initiative would have raised taxes on the wealthy to fund wildfire management and electric vehicle (and ZEV) incentives and infrastructure.

A "yes" vote supported the tax increase on income above $2 million; a "no" vote supported maintaining the current tax rate for people of this income.

== Proposal ==
The initiative would have raised taxes by 1.75% on annual personal income in excess of $2 million and directed 45% of the revenue to incentives, 35% to charging stations, and 20% to wildfire prevention. The tax revenue the proposal would have generated was estimated to be between $3 and $4.5 billion annually. The tax would have sunset in 2043, or after California achieved a reduction in greenhouse gas (GHG) emissions of 80% below 1990 levels, whichever was earlier.

Wildfires and gas combustion contribute to air pollution and release greenhouse gases, so these measures could have improved air quality and contributed to climate mitigation. It would have combated wildfires by increasing the budget for the California Department of Forestry and Fire Protection by up to $1 billion annually.

== Support and opposition ==
The campaign for Proposition 30 was mostly funded by the rideshare company Lyft, which could have used the incentives to facilitate compliance with the state's electric vehicle requirements. Specifically, ride-hailing companies are required by the state to log 90 percent of their miles in electric vehicles by 2030, and the proposition could have increased the number of drivers with electric vehicles. By April 2022, Lyft had already spent $8 million in support of the proposition. It was also supported by the California Democratic Party, California Environmental Voters, the State Building and Construction Trades Council of California, and the California State Association of Electrical Workers. It was supported by Representatives Ro Khanna and Barbara Lee, and mayors Sam Liccardo and Libby Schaaf. Environmental and transportation experts argued that Proposition 30 is necessary because the state's prior investments in electrification were insufficient.

The proposition was opposed by the California Republican Party, the California Teachers Association, the California Chamber of Commerce, and the Howard Jarvis Taxpayers Association. Governor Gavin Newsom also criticized Lyft, saying that the proposition was "a cynical scheme devised by a single corporation to funnel state income tax revenue to their company", noting that the state had already committed $10 billion for electric vehicles and their infrastructure. The campaign against Proposition 30 also produced a TV ad featuring Newsom, where he argued that the initiative was "a trojan horse that puts corporate welfare above the fiscal welfare of our entire state". The biggest donors to the opposition campaign were hedge fund manager William S. Fisher and billionaire Michael Moritz, and investment firm founder Mark Heising.

Environmental policy experts such as Bill Magavern of the Coalition for Clean Air refuted the governor's claims, clarifying that nothing in the measure directed money specifically to Lyft. “It doesn’t take money from any other purpose. This is money that otherwise would just be in the pockets of really rich people,” he said. “And I think when you’re talking about motives, you got to look who’s funding the governor’s attack: really rich people.” For this reason, Joe Garofoli of the San Francisco Chronicle alleged that Newsom opposed the measure to further his presidential ambitions. The measure's ultimate failure was widely attributed to Newsom's opposition.

== Polling ==
Poll source	Date(s) administered	Sample size (Note: Key: A – all adults RV – registered voters LV – likely voters V – unclear)	Margin of error	For Proposition 30	Against Proposition 30	Undecided
Berkeley IGS Poll	October 25–31, 2022	5,972 (LV)	± 2%	47%	41%	12%
Public Policy Institute of California	October 14–23, 2022	1,111 (LV)	± 5.1%	41%	52%	7%
Public Policy Institute of California	July 8–15, 2022	1,132 (LV)	± 4.1%	63%	35%	2%
