= William S. Fisher =

American investor (born 1958)

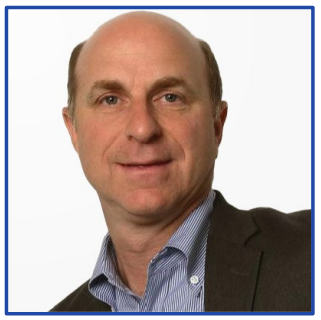
- Born: William Sydney Fisher; 1958 (age 67–68)
- Education: Princeton University; Stanford University
- Known for: Founding and managing Manzanita Capital
- Spouse: Sakurako Fisher
- Children: 3
- Parent(s): Donald Fisher; Doris Feigenbaum
- Family: Robert J. Fisher (brother); John J. Fisher (brother)

William Sydney Fisher (born 1958) is an American hedge fund manager. He has been a director of Gap Inc. since 2009, and the founder and chief executive officer of Manzanita Capital Limited. The son of Gap Inc. founders Donald Fisher and Doris F. Fisher, William Fisher has been involved with the company as a board member or employee for nearly 30 years.

As of January 2018, Fisher has a net worth of US$1.85 billion.

== Early life and education ==
Fisher was born to a Jewish family, is the son of Doris Feigenbaum Fisher and Don Fisher, the co-founders of Gap, Inc. He has two brothers: Robert J. Fisher and John J. Fisher. Fisher attended Phillips Exeter Academy. He is a 1979 graduate of Princeton University, where he received a bachelor's degree and a 1984 graduate of the Stanford University Graduate School of Business, from which he earned a master's degree in Business Administration.

== Investment career ==
Fisher began his career at The Gap after earning his MBA, starting first as the store director for the Banana Republic and then the general manager for Gap in Canada. Fisher served as the president of the Gap's international division and is credited with expanding the company into Canada, France, Germany, the United Kingdom, and Japan. In 2001, he founded the London-based private equity firm Manzanita Capital and serves as its CEO. Manzanita concentrates its investments in branded luxury companies in Europe, consumer goods, and retail. In 2009, he was appointed to the Gap's board of directors.

== Political views ==
In 2019, it was revealed that Fisher, together with his mother Doris F. Fisher, as well as brothers Robert J. Fisher and John J. Fisher, had donated nearly $9 million to a dark money group which opposed Barack Obama in the 2012 election.

== Personal life ==
Fisher is married to Sakurako Fisher, and the couple has three children. His wife, who graduated from Stanford with a B.A. in 1982, was born in Japan to an American father and a Japanese mother and serves as president of the San Francisco Symphony Orchestra and chair of the Smithsonian National Board.

== Wealth and philanthropy ==
According to Forbes Magazine, he has a net worth of $1.85 billion.

Fisher donates heavily to his alma mater Stanford and has a professorship there. In 2011, he donated $1 million to Stanford's Freeman Spogli Institute for International Studies. He serves as vice chairman of the science museum Exploratorium in San Francisco. Like many other members of the Fisher family, he supports pro-charter school candidates in a variety of races.

In September 2022, Fisher donated $980,000 to the "No on 30" California ballot campaign; Proposition 30 was defeated but would have increased taxes on those earning more than $2 million per year.
