= Peter W. Forbes =

American politician

Peter Forbes

Member of the California State Assembly from the 27th district
- In office January 7, 1907 - January 4, 1909
- Preceded by: Aubrey M. Lumley
- Succeeded by: George Washington Wyllie

Personal details
- Born: November 23, 1850 Prince Edward Island, Canada
- Died: March 1, 1923 (aged 72) Bishop, California
- Party: Democratic
- Spouse: Jennie Yandell
- Children: 1

Peter Wallace Forbes (November 23, 1850 – March 1, 1923) served in the California State Assembly for the 27th district from 1907 to 1909. He was born November 23, 1850, in Prince Edward Island, Canada.
