= Gap Inc. =

American multinational clothing retailer

The Gap, Inc.
- Logo used since 2017

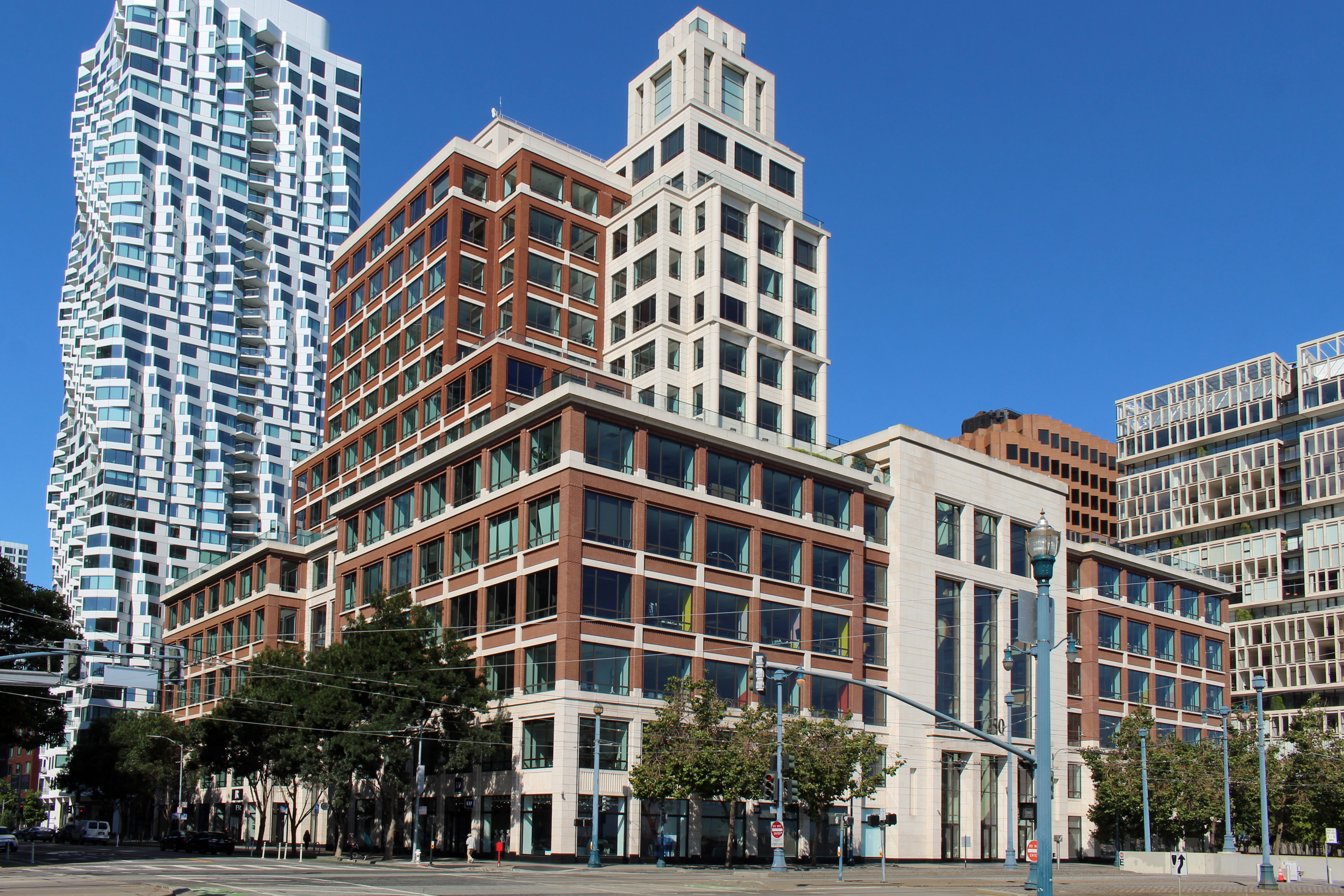
- Gap Inc. headquarters building
- Trade name: Gap Inc.
- Type: Public
- Traded as: NYSE: GAP; S&P 400 component
- Industry: Retail
- Founded: August 21, 1969; 57 years ago; in San Francisco, California, U.S.
- Founders: Donald Fisher; Doris F. Fisher
- Headquarters: San Francisco, California, U.S.
- Number of locations: 3,569 (2025)
- Area served: Multinational
- Key people: Mayo A. Shattuck III (chairman); Richard Dickson (CEO); Katrina O'Connell (CFO)
- Products: Apparel; accessories; personal care products
- Brands: Gap; Athleta
- Revenue: ▲US$15.4 billion (2025)
- Net income: ▼US$816 million (2025)
- Owner: William S. Fisher (16.09%); Robert J. Fisher (15.39%)
- Number of employees: 82,000 (2025)
- Divisions: Banana Republic; Old Navy
- Website: gap.com; gapinc.com

The Gap, Inc., commonly known as Gap Inc., headquartered in San Francisco, California, is an American multinational clothing and accessories retailer. The company operates four primary divisions: the namesake Gap, Banana Republic, Old Navy, and Athleta. Gap Inc. is one of the largest apparel retailers in the United States. It operates 3,569 stores. Zac Posen is the creative director of the Gap.

Gap was founded in 1969 by Donald Fisher and Doris F. Fisher. Their sons, William S. Fisher and Robert J. Fisher, each own approximately 15% of the company.

== History ==
In 1969, Don Fisher, a California commercial real estate broker specializing in retail store location, enlisted the help of his friend, Walter Haas Jr., President of Levi Strauss & Co. Fisher was inspired by the sudden success of 'The Tower of Shoes' in an old Quonset hut in a non-retail industrial area of Sacramento, California, that drew crowds by advertising that no matter what brand, style or size of shoes a woman could want it was at The Tower of Shoes. And knowing that even Macy's, the biggest Levi's customer, was constantly running out of the best selling Levi's sizes and colors, Fisher asked Haas to let him copy The Tower of Shoes' business model and apply it to Levi's products. Haas referred Fisher to Bud Robinson, his Director of Advertising, for what Haas assumed would be a quick refusal; but instead Robinson and Fisher carefully worked out a legal test plan for what was to become the Gap (named by Don's wife Doris Fisher). The name was a reference to the "generation gap".

Fisher agreed to stock only Levi's apparel in every style and size, all grouped by size, and Levi's guaranteed the Gap to be never out of stock by overnight replenishment from Levi's San Jose, California warehouse. And finally, Robinson offered to pay 50% of the Gap's radio advertising upfront and avoided antitrust laws by offering the same marketing package to any store that agreed to sell nothing but Levi's products.

Fisher opened the first Gap store near City College on Ocean Avenue in Ingleside, San Francisco on August 21, 1969; its only merchandise consisted of Levi's and LP records to attract teen customers.

In 1970, Gap opened its second store in San Jose. In 1971, Gap established its corporate headquarters in Burlingame, California with four employees. By 1973, the company had over 25 locations and had expanded into the East Coast market with a store in the Echelon Mall in Voorhees, New Jersey. In 1974, Gap began to sell private label merchandise.

In the 1990s, Gap assumed an upscale identity and revamped its inventory under the direction of Mickey Drexler. However, Drexler was removed from his position after 19 years in 2002 after over-expansion, a 29-month slump in sales, and tensions with the Fisher family. Drexler refused to sign a non-compete agreement and eventually became CEO of J. Crew. One month after his departure, merchandise that he had ordered was responsible for a strong rebound in sales. Robert J. Fisher recruited Paul Pressler as the new CEO; he was credited with closing under-performing locations and paying off debt. However, his focus groups failed to recover the company's leadership in its market.

Brand logo, which is a revision of 1988 wordmark, used since 2017

In 2007, Gap announced that it would "focus [its] efforts on recruiting a chief executive officer who has deep retailing and merchandising experience ideally in apparel, understands the creative process and can effectively execute strategies in large, complex environments while maintaining strong financial discipline". That January, Pressler resigned after two disappointing holiday sales seasons and was succeeded by Robert J. Fisher on an interim basis. He began working with the company in 1980 and joined the board in 1990, and would later assume several senior executive positions, including president of Banana Republic and the Gap units. The board's search committee was led by Adrian Bellamy, chairman of The Body Shop International and included founder Donald Fisher. On February 2, Marka Hansen, the former head of the Banana Republic division, replaced Cynthia Harriss as the leader of the Gap division. The executive president for marketing and merchandising Jack Calhoun became interim president of Banana Republic.

In May, Old Navy laid off approximately 300 managers in lower volume locations to help streamline costs. That July, Glenn Murphy, previously CEO of Shoppers Drug Mart in Canada, was announced as the new CEO of Gap, Inc. New lead designers were also brought on board to help define a fashionable image, including Patrick Robinson for Gap Adult, Simon Kneen for Banana Republic, and Todd Oldham for Old Navy. Robinson was hired as chief designer in 2007, but was dismissed in May 2011 after sales failed to increase. However, he enjoyed commercial success in international markets.

In October 2007, BBC footage showed child labor in Gap factories in India. The company denied knowledge of the happenings; it subsequently removed and destroyed the single piece of clothing in question, a smock blouse, from a British store. Gap promised to investigate breaches in its ethical policy.

In October 2011, Gap announced plans to close 189 US stores, nearly 21% of its total US stores, by the end of 2013; however, it also announced plans to expand its presence in China. The company announced it would open its first stores in Brazil in the Fall of 2013. In February 2014, Gap announced that it would raise the minimum wages for its 65,000 U.S. store employees to $9/hour in 2014 and $10/hour in 2015. In January 2015, Gap Inc. announced plans to close its subsidiary Piperlime in order to focus on its core brands. The first and only Piperlime store, based in SoHo, New York City, closed in April. In September 2018, Gap Inc. began publicizing Hill City, a men's athletic apparel brand that launched in October 2018.

In March 2020, the Australian Strategic Policy Institute, a think tank, accused at least 82 major brands, including Gap, of being connected to forced Uyghur labor in Xinjiang. In June 2020, Gap Inc. announced that it had made the decision to wind down its Hill City brand in the coming months. Weeks later, the company announced a collaboration with Kanye West's Yeezy brand: Yeezy Gap as part of a 10-year deal. However, West accused Gap of failing to honor terms of the deal and ended the partnership in September 2022. In August 2020, the company announced that it, alongside its Banana Republic brand, would close over 225 store locations as a result of the COVID-19 pandemic response. Less than two months later, the company announced that the total number of stores to be closed by 2024 was 350. (220 Gap stores and 130 Banana Republic stores.) The original plan of the company was to close only 90 stores, however, it expanded the number as a consequence of the financial effects caused by the pandemic restrictions. Most of the stores closed were ones set in malls. In November 2020, Gap Inc. partnered with Afterpay. This collaboration was planned to improve the digital shopping experience.

In February 2021, Gap Inc. announced a $140 million investment to build an 850,000 square foot distribution center in Longview, Texas, because it forecasts that its online business will double over the next two years. The new center will be able to process one million packages per day once completed in 2022. In August 2021, Gap acquired Drapr, an online tech application where customers can create 3D Avatars and virtually try on clothing. In September 2021, Gap Inc. cut the ribbon for the $41.7 million facility expansion in Gallatin, TN. In addition to hiring 1,100 employees to meet the demands of market share growth and peak season, Gap partnered with AHS to implement an automated order fulfillment system.

In September 2022, the company announced it would end its partnership with Kanye West. Several days later, Gap announced it would cut some 500 corporate positions in its San Francisco and New York offices. The firm also cut corporate jobs in Asia. Gap announced that the layoffs were unrelated to the decision to end its partnership with West. Gap announced more layoffs in April 2023. Gap Inc. closed all stores in Russia in 2022 due to the unpopularity of the brand in Russia and due to the 2022 Russian invasion of Ukraine.

In 2023, Gap launched a programme to support emerging designers in their early stages of development. The programme is sponsored by the company's internal initiative, Create With Audacity, providing space, tools and resources to develop talent. In partnership with ICON360, the non-profit arm of Harlem's Fashion Row Gap supports underrepresented Black designers in the industry, as well as fashion programmes at Historically Black Colleges and Universities (HBCUs). In April 2023, Gap announced 500 layoffs. In 2023, Gap partnered with Cargill, GSK, WaterAid and the Water Resilience Coalition to launch the Women + Water Collaborative to improve access to clean water and sanitation in India, starting in the Krishna and Godavari River basins. In May 2024, Gap introduced its limited collection in partnership with Dôen, celebrating sisterhood.

On September 4, 2025, Gap announced its intentions to sell personal care products and cosmetics at its Old Navy stores.

In July 2026, Gap Inc. expanded its creator program to include eligible employees, allowing staff across its brands to participate in content creation and brand advocacy initiatives.

=== Management history ===
Donald Fisher was chairman of the board until 2004, playing a role in the ouster of then-CEO Millard Drexler in 2002, and remained on the board until his death in 2009. Fisher's wife and their son, Robert J. Fisher, are also on Gap's board of directors. Bob succeeded his father as chairman in 2004 and was CEO on an interim basis following the resignation of Paul Pressler in 2007, before being succeeded by Glenn K. Murphy up until 2014. From February 2015 to November 2019, Art Peck was CEO of Gap Inc., until he was replaced by Sonia Syngal in March 2020.

Syngal resigned in July 2022, with executive chairman Bob Martin as interim CEO. In February 2024, Gap appointed American fashion designer Zac Posen as Creative Director of Gap, and Chief Creative Officer for Old Navy.

== Corporate identity ==
=== Logo ===
Gap Inc. owns a trademark to its name, "Gap". The Gap's original trademark was a service mark for retail clothing store services. The application was filed with the United States Patent and Trademark Office on February 29, 1972, by the Gap Stores; registration was granted on October 10, 1972. The first use of the trademark was on August 23, 1969, and expanded to commercial usage on October 17, 1969. A second application was filed by Gap Stores, Inc. on September 12, 1970, this time for a trademark filed for shirts. The first usage for shirts and clothing products was on June 25, 1974. Trademark registration was granted on December 28, 1976. Both the service mark and trademark are registered and owned by Gap (Apparel), LLC of San Francisco, California.

On October 4, 2010, in an effort to establish a contemporary presence, Gap introduced a new logo. It was designed with the Helvetica font and reduced the prominence of the brand's iconic blue box. After much public outcry, the company reverted to its previous "blue box" logo on October 11, after less than a week in use. Marka Hansen, the executive who oversaw the logo change, resigned February 1, 2011.

August 21, 1969 – 1988

1988 – October 3, 2010, October 12, 2010 – December 31, 2015

October 4 – 11, 2010

January 1, 2016 – 2017

2017 – present

=== Brands ===
==== Banana Republic ====
Banana Republic, a small safari-themed clothing retailer, was purchased by Gap in 1983 and was rebranded as an upscale clothing retailer in the late 1980s.

==== Old Navy ====
Old Navy was launched in 1994 as a value chain. On February 28, 2019, Gap Inc., announced that Old Navy will spin-off from the company, making Old Navy independent from Gap Inc. This was reversed on January 16, 2020, when Gap Inc. announced that the separation had been called off.

==== Athleta ====
Athleta was founded in 1998 as an independent company focused on women's athletic apparel. Gap acquired Athleta in 2008. Gap opened the first brick and mortar Athleta store in 2011.

==== Forth & Towne ====
Forth & Towne, the company's fourth traditional retail concept, was launched on August 24, 2005, featuring apparel targeted toward women 35 years and older. On February 26, 2007, after an 18-month trial period, it was discontinued.

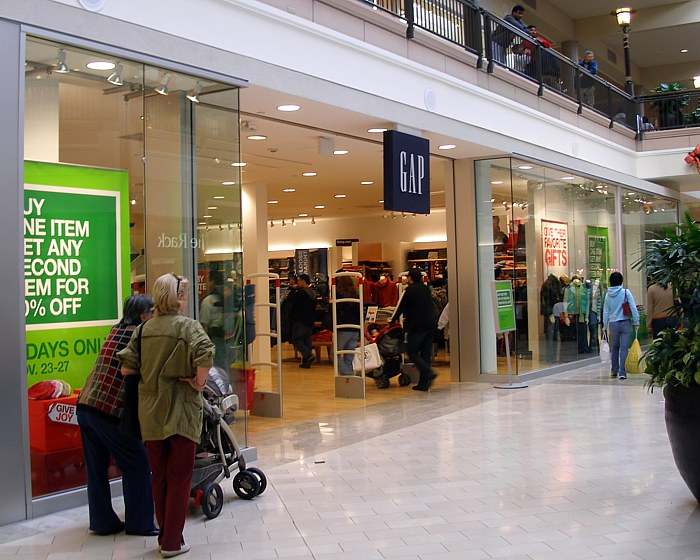
A Gap location in Westfield Valley Fair, San Jose, California

The Gap targeted the younger generation when it opened, with its name referring to the generation gap of the time. It originally sold everything that Levi Strauss & Co made in every style, size, and color, and organized the stock by size. The Gap was the first of many shops that carried only Levi's. In 1973, Gap started making its own jeans as a way to differentiate themselves from department stores.

Gap's marketing works to appeal to a broad demographic of customers, whereas Banana Republic presents a sophisticated image with a self expressing easygoing personality and Old Navy focuses "fun, fashion, and value" for families and younger customers. While the company has been criticized for blandness and uniformity in its selling environments, it maintains that it tailors its stores "to appeal to unique markets" by developing multiple formats and designs.

In 2018, a Gap ad campaign featuring a young girl wearing a hijab was controversial in France.

=== International presence ===
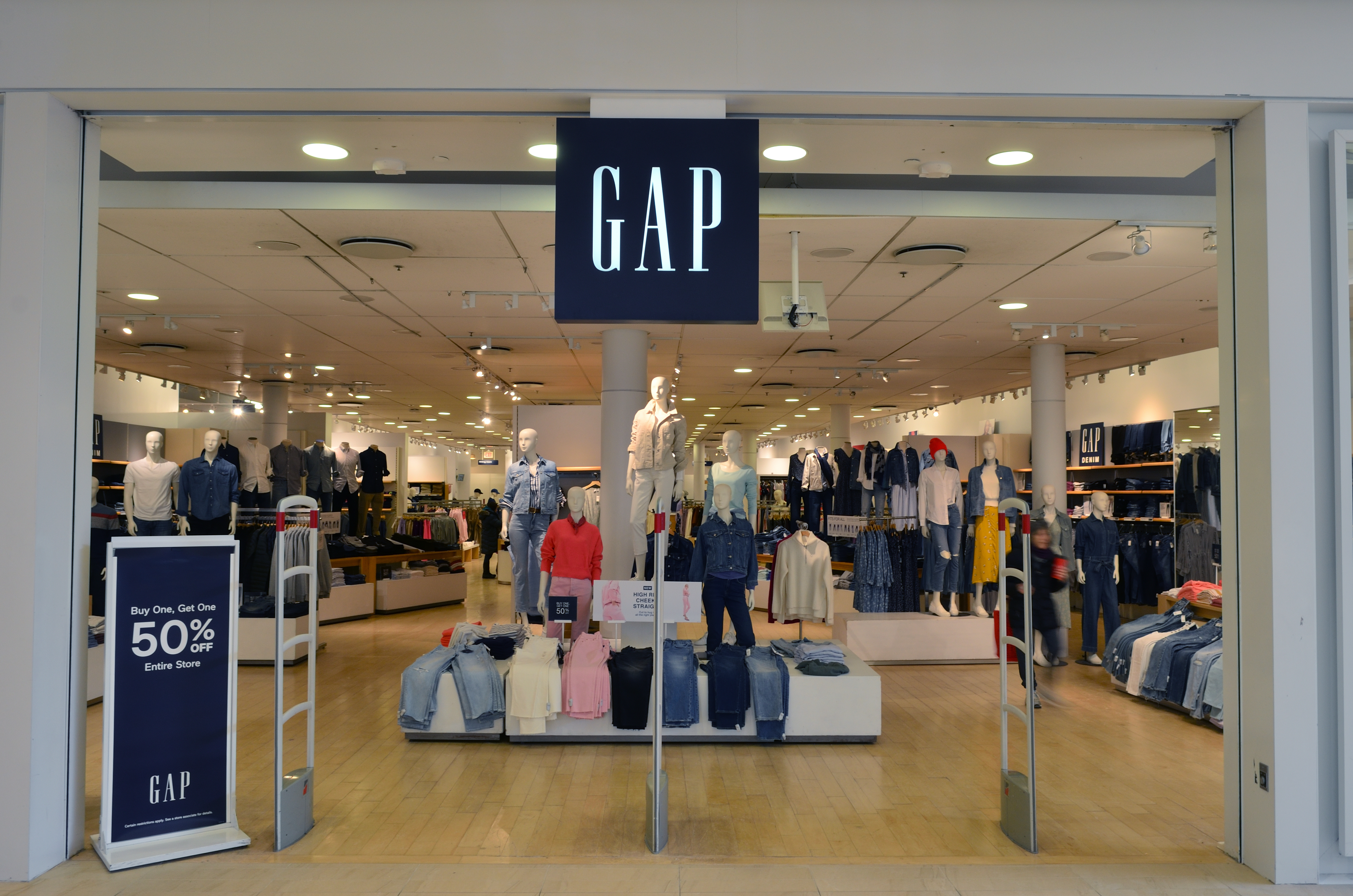
Gap in Hillcrest Mall

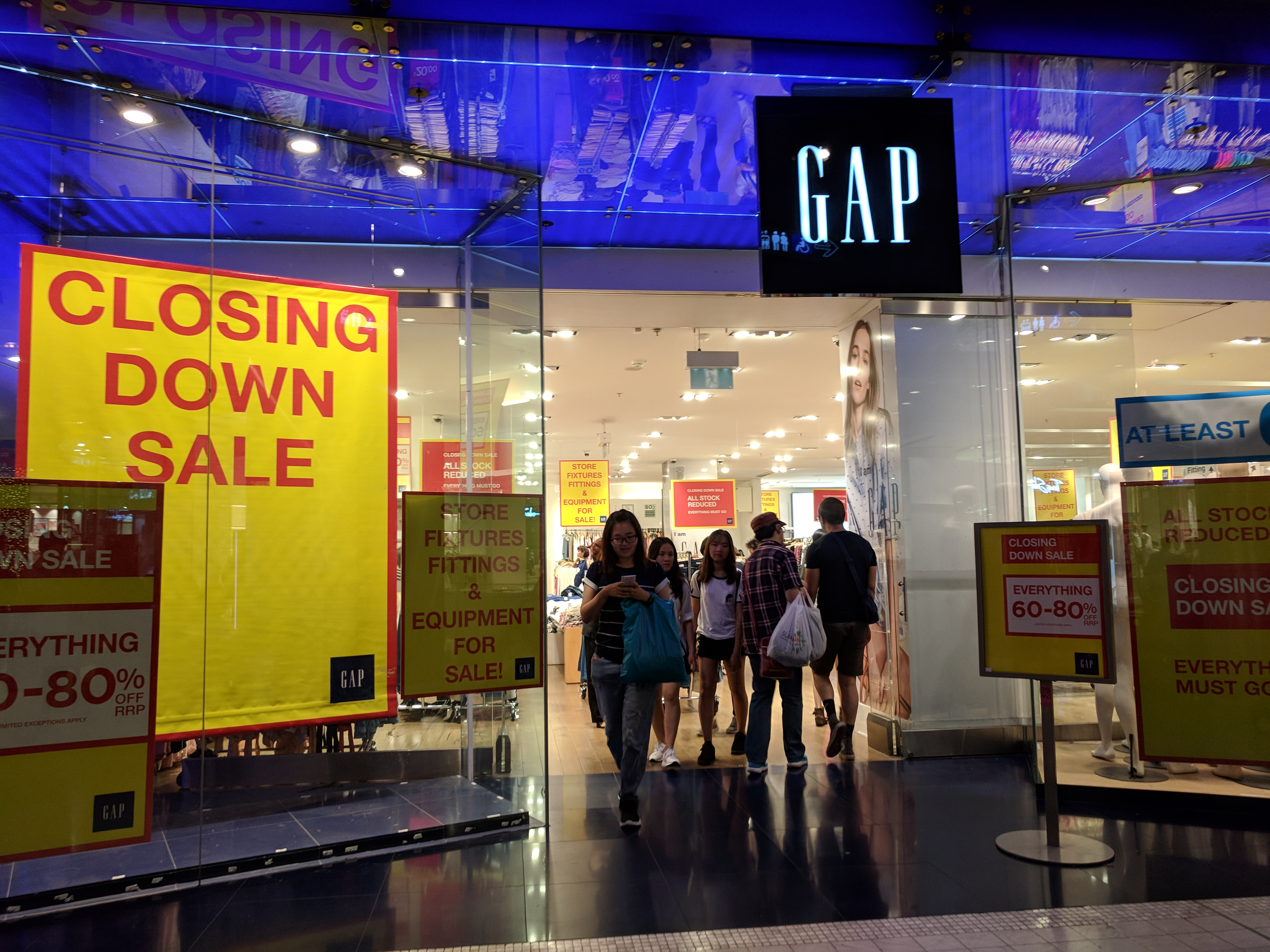
The closing down sale at the Gap store in Westfield Sydney

Including both company-owned and franchised stores, as of June 2018, there were Gap, Banana Republic, Athleta, Intermix, or Old Navy stores in 43 countries. In January 2008, Gap signed a deal with Marinopoulos Group to open Gap and Banana Republic stores in Greece, Romania, Bulgaria, Cyprus, and Croatia. In February 2009, Elbit Imaging, Ltd. secured a franchise to open and operate Gap and Banana Republic stores in Israel. In August 2010, the company opened its first store in Melbourne, Australia at Chadstone Shopping Centre. In September 2011, Komax opened the first Gap store in Chile, due to a franchise. In October 2011, the first GAP store opened in Warsaw, Poland. Gap has a store in New Delhi, India which opened in May 2015. On February 20, 2016, Gap launched stores in Mumbai at Oberoi Mall and Infinity-2.

In May 2016, Gap Inc. announced it would shutter all Old Navy stores in Japan in response to poor Q1 performance for Old Navy and consistent losses across the organization.

In 2017, Gap closed all seven of its stores in Israel. In 2018, Gap closed all its stores in Australia and Indonesia.

By May 2021, Gap operated company-owned stores in the United States, Canada, Mexico, the United Kingdom, France, India, Italy, the Czech Republic, Ireland, Japan, Philippines, China, and Taiwan.

However, in June 2021, Gap confirmed plans to close all its 81 stores in the UK and Ireland and go online-only. The company said it would close all its stores "in a phased manner" between the end of August and the end of September. At the same time, Gap said it was in negotiations with another firm to take over all of its French stores. In Italy, Gap said it was in discussions with a partner for the potential acquisition of the stores there. In September 2021, Gap and British clothes retailer Next announced a joint venture that will see Next manage Gap's UK website and place Gap concessions in some stores. The deal preserves Gap's presence on the UK high street following the closure of its own stores. In November 2022, Baozun announced it intended to purchase Gap's China unit, and that it would continue to operate Gap stores in China and Taiwan as franchises.

=== Product Red ===
In 2006, Gap took part in Bono's Product Red campaign with the launch of a special RED collection, including a T-shirt manufactured in Lesotho from African cotton. The expanded Gap Product Red collection was released on October 13, 2006. 50 to 100 percent of the profits went to the Global Fund, depending on the item. The company continued the products into 2007, especially in the lead up to Valentine's Day, using slogans such as "Admi(RED)" and "Desi(RED)". National Labor Committee for Worker and Human Rights activists criticized Gap's partnerships because Gap has historically been accused of sweatshop-like conditions. Product Red has contributed over $45 million to the Global Fund, more than any other private donation received to date. Other launch partners included American Express, Apple Inc., Converse, Hallmark, Emporio Armani, and Motorola.

== Legal and regulatory issues ==
In 1999, news outlets reported instances sweatshop workers in Saipan not being paid for overtime work, being subjected to forced abortion, and being required to work in unsafe working conditions. In 2003, a class action lawsuit against Gap and 21 other companies was started which ended when a settlement of $20 million was reached.

In May 2006, adult and child employees of Western Factory, a supplier in Irbid, Jordan, were found to have worked up to 109 hours per week and to have gone six months without being paid. Some employees claimed they had been raped by managers. The government of Jordan launched an investigation into the supplier and other textile factories and announced actions to prevent future abuses. Walmart, who also sources from the supplier, confirmed "serious problems with working conditions" at Western Factory and other Jordanian suppliers. As of May 2018, Gap had ceased its relationship with Western Factory.

== Management ==
=== Leadership ===
The current leadership is:

- Richard Dickson, Chief Executive Officer, Gap Inc.
- Katrina O'Connell, Chief Financial Officer
- Mark Breitbard, President & CEO, Gap
- Chris Blakeslee, President and CEO, Athleta
- Haio Barbeito, Brand President & CEO, Old Navy
- Vacant, Brand President & CEO, Banana Republic
- Eric Chan, Chief Business & Strategy Officer
- Amy Thompson, Chief People Officer
- Julie Gruber, Chief Legal & Compliance Officer & Corporate Secretary
- Zac Posen, Creative Director, Gap, Inc. & Chief Creative Officer, Old Navy
- Sally Gilligan, Chief Supply Chain & Transformation Officer
- Sven Gerjets, Chief Digital & Technology Officer

=== Board of directors ===
The board as of June 2024 includes: Mayo A. Shattuck III (Chair of the Board), Richard Dixon, Lisa Donohue, Robert J. Fisher, William S. Fisher, Tracy Gardner, Kathryn A. Hall, Amy Miles, Chris O'Neill, and Tariq Shaukat

== Stores ==
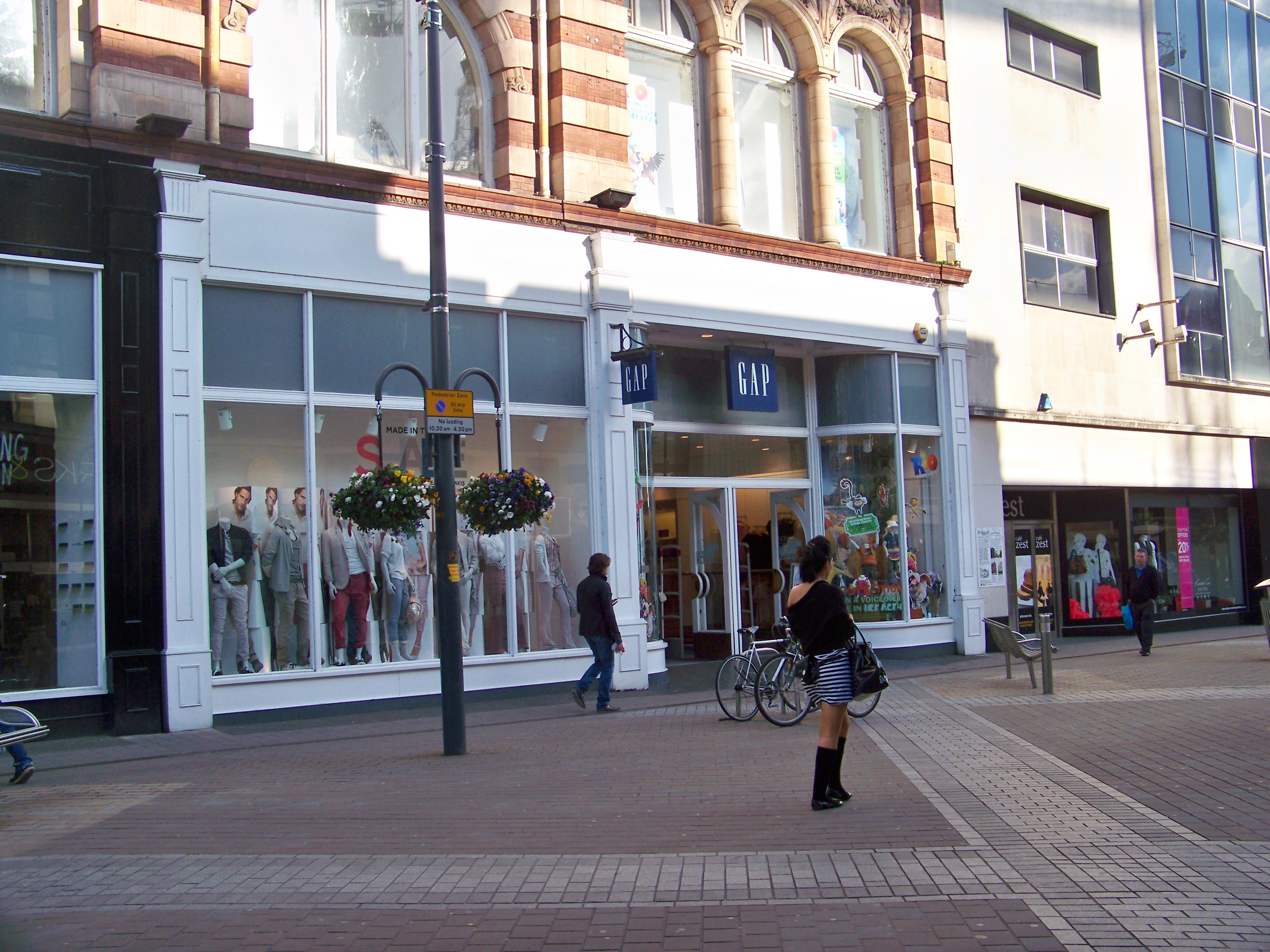
A Gap store on Briggate in Leeds, West Yorkshire

As of the end of Q3 2018, Gap Inc. had 3,688 company-operated or franchised stores in operation across 43 countries and had the ability to ship to 90 countries. Stores in Brazil, Canada, China, France, Italy, Ireland, Japan, Mexico, UK, and US (including Puerto Rico) are company-owned; those outside of these countries are owned and operated by franchises.

In addition to previous store closures (such as the 2011–2013 closures in the U.S.), hundreds of stores were closed worldwide over several years, starting in 2020. (See § International presence section for details.) The table below is based on data from February 2024.

Gap Inc.'s annual store count by brand
	2005	2006	2007	2008	2009	2010	2011	2012	2013	2014	2015	2016	2017	2018	2019	2020	2021	2022	2023	2024
Gap North America	1396	1335	1293	1249	1193	1152	1111	1043	990	968	960	866	844	810	758	675	556	520	493	472
Gap Asia	78	91	105	110	113	120	135	152	191	228	266	305	311	313	332	358	340	329	232	134
Gap Europe	169	165	168	173	173	178	184	193	198	193	189	175	164	155	152	137	117	11	-	-
Old Navy North America	889	959	1012	1059	1067	1039	1027	1016	1010	1004	1013	1030	1043	1066	1139	1207	1220	1252	1238	1243
Old Navy Asia	-	-	-	-	-	-	-	-	1	18	43	65	13	14	15	17	-	-	-	-
Banana Republic North America	462	494	521	555	573	576	576	581	590	596	610	612	601	576	556	541	471	446	419	400
Banana Republic Asia	-	4	13	21	27	27	29	31	38	43	44	51	48	45	45	48	47	50	46	43
Banana Republic Europe	-	-	-	-	3	3	5	10	10	11	11	10	1	-	-	-	-	-	-	-
Athleta North America	-	-	-	-	-	-	1	10	35	65	101	120	132	148	161	190	199	227	257	270
Piperlime North America	-	-	-	-	-	-	-	-	1	1	1	-	-	-	-	-	-	-	-	-
Intermix North America	-	-	-	-	-	-	-	-	31	37	42	41	43	38	36	33	31	-	-	-
Janie and Jack North America	-	-	-	-	-	-	-	-	-	-	-	-	-	-	-	139	119	-	-	-
Franchise	-	-	-	-	-	-	178	227	312	375	429	446	459	429	472	574	615	564	667	998
Total	2994	3048	3112	3167	3149	3095	3246	3263	3407	3539	3709	3721	3659	3594	3666	3919	3715	3399	3352	3560

== See also ==
- Bonds (clothing)
- H&M
- Forever 21
- Hollister Co.
