= Piperlime =

Former online retail company

- Company type: Subsidiary
- Industry: Retail
- Founded: 2006
- Defunct: 2015
- Headquarters: San Francisco, California
- Products: Shoes
- Parent: Gap Inc.
- Website: www.piperlime.com

Piperlime was an online retail company based in San Francisco, California. Founded in 2006 as a spin-off by Gap Inc., Piperlime offered a selection of footwear and handbags for women, men and children. Beginning in fall 2009, the company sold women's clothing and, later, men's clothing, with the men's business retiring in August 2014.

On January 23, 2015, Gap Inc. announced its decision to close Piperlime by the end of April 2015, in order to focus resources on its core brands. Piperlime was Gap's smallest brand, with annual revenue below $100 million, which was less than one percent of Gap's total revenue.

== History ==
Initially launched with more than 100 well-known brands, Piperlime stocked over 250 footwear brands, including women's salon and designer brands like Alberto Fermani, Hollywould, Giuseppe Zanotti, Belle by Sigerson Morrison, Frye, Donald J Pliner, Kenneth Cole, Nine West, Crocs, Converse and Steve Madden.

Since launching its handbag division in spring 2008, Piperlime stocked over 30 handbag brands including Marc by Marc Jacobs, Chloe, Botkier, Kooba, Foley + Corinna, Beirn, Orla Kiely and Linea Pelle.

Piperlime had ongoing partnerships with celebrity stylists, who recommended their favorite seasonal products online as "Fashion Editors". Stylists included Rachel Zoe, Rachel Bilson and Olivia Palermo.

The company partnered with the creators of the reality show Project Runway for seasons eight and nine. In addition to sponsoring the fashion show's "accessories wall," the retailer provided one of the major prizes for the winner of the show's eighth season (the opportunity for the winner to design a collection to be sold exclusively by Piperlime).

The first Piperlime retail store opened in SoHo, New York City, on September 6, 2012, and closed April 2015.
