= Paul Pressler (businessman) =

American business executive

Paul S. Pressler
- Born: 1956 (age 69–70); New York City, New York, United States
- Education: State University of New York at Oneonta
- Occupation: Business executive
- Years active: 1980s–present
- Known for: President of Disneyland (1994–1999); President of Walt Disney Attractions (1999–2000); Chairman of Walt Disney Parks & Resorts (2000–2002)

Paul Pressler (born 1956) is an American business executive. He is the chairman of the board of directors of eBay. He has held executive positions at companies such as Gap, Inc., the Walt Disney Company, and was a partner at the private equity firm Clayton, Dubilier & Rice.

== Early life and education ==
Pressler was born in New York City in 1956. He received his bachelor's degree in business economics from the State University of New York at Oneonta.

== Career ==
After studying, Pressler was hired as an urban planner in New York City. After six months, he changed jobs to Remco Toys. In 1982, Pressler was hired as vice president of designing and marketing development for Kenner-Parker Toys and was an executive producer of The Care Bears Movie.

=== Disney ===
Following closure of his unit at Kenner, Pressler took a product licensing post at Disney Consumer Products in 1987 and created a deal with Mattel for preschool Disney toys which competed with Playskool and Fisher Price. Pressler was then selected as the head of The Disney Store. While running The Disney Store, he brought together builders, designers, engineers and merchandisers to design the next prototype Disney Store that opened in third quarter of 1994. He used the "land" concept from the Disney Parks for the prototype to "make it more entertaining by utilizing more storytelling".

In November 1994, Pressler became the president of Disneyland—the second executive to hold that position after Disney Legend Jack Lindquist. During his tenure, Pressler was "credited with guiding the theme parks through tough times", but was also known for cost-cutting measures such as reducing customer service training, having employees wash their own uniforms, and closing rides and shows early. He attempted to discontinue a disabled discount but was forced to back down after a backlash. With the cost cutting, Disneyland was profitable while attendance declined.

Pressler was promoted to president of Walt Disney Attractions in December 1998 under its chair, Judson Green. In 2000, he was promoted to chairman of Walt Disney Parks and Resorts (formerly Disney Attractions). With the retirement on December 31, 2000, of Disney vice chairman Sandy Litvack, the Anaheim Sports subsidiary began reporting directly to Pressler. Pressler oversaw a major expansion, including the opening of the new California Adventure theme park, Disney's Grand Californian Hotel, the remodeling of the Disney's Paradise Pier Hotel, a new retail, dining and entertainment complex called Downtown Disney and a new multi-story parking area. The new park and hotels opened in early 2001, and the entire complex was named the Disneyland Resort.

=== After Disney ===
Pressler left Disney in September of 2002 to become the chief executive at Gap Inc. after initially turning them down. Gap was struggling with an over-expansion of store locations. Pressler brought in several other Disney executives. In summer 2004, he had Gap launch a new chain, Forth & Towne. He resigned on January 22, 2007.

Pressler was elected to the Avon board of directors on July 14, 2005.

On July 14, 2009, Pressler was made an advisor to the private equity firm Clayton, Dubilier & Rice—and eventually became a partner. Clayton, Dubilier & Rice's acquired David's Bridal in 2012 and made Pressler chairman of the retailer—a position he held until 2018. Pressler was also chairman of AssuraMed Holding, Inc. from 2010 to 2013 and SiteOne Landscape Supply, Inc. from to 2013 to 2017.

Pressler was appointed to the board of directors of eBay on September 29, 2015. He was promoted chairman of the board on June 29, 2020, following the resignation of Tom Tierney.
