= Old Navy =

American clothing and accessories retailer owned by Gap Inc

- Type: Division
- Industry: Retail
- Founded: March 11, 1994; 32 years ago (as Old Navy)
- Founder: Millard "Mickey" Drexler
- Headquarters: San Francisco, California, US
- Number of locations: 1,142
- Key people: Horacio Barbeito (CEO and Global President)
- Products: Clothing
- Revenue: $8.2 billion (2023)
- Parent: Gap Inc. (1993–present)
- Website: oldnavy.gap.com

Old Navy is an American clothing and accessories retailing company owned by Gap Inc., a multinational corporation. It has corporate operations in the Mission Bay neighborhood of San Francisco, California. The largest of the Old Navy stores are its flagship stores, located in New York City, Manila, and Mexico City.

== History and description ==
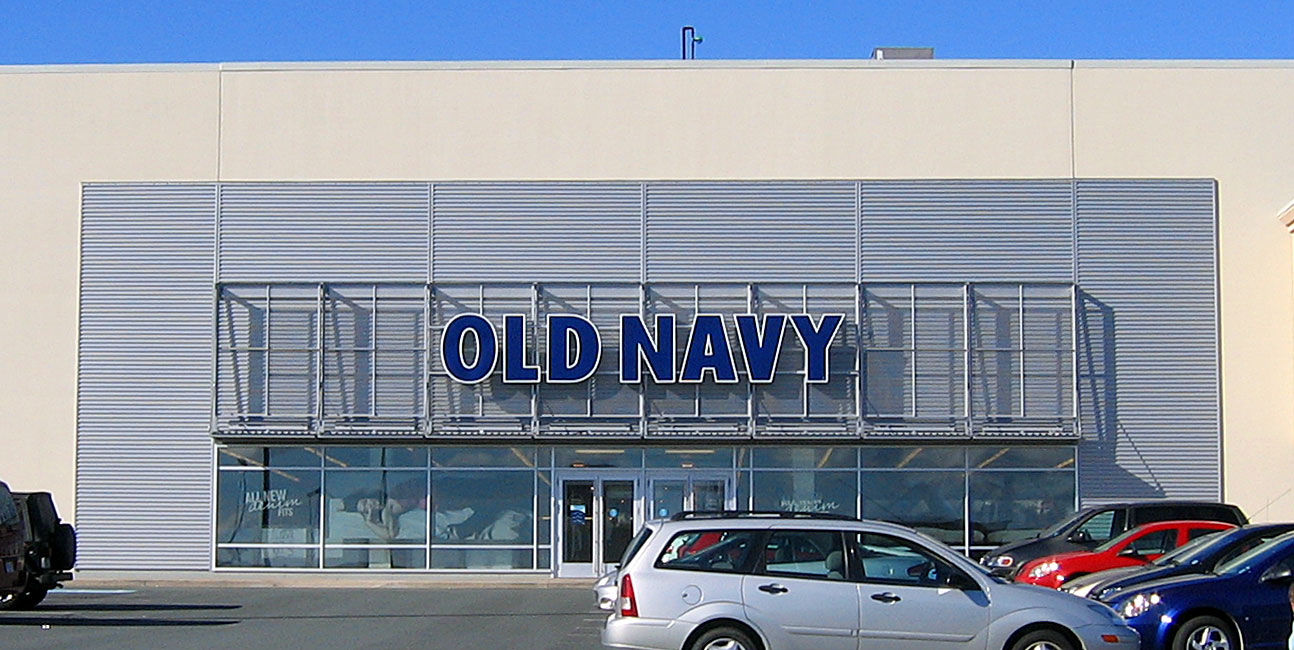
An Old Navy store in Bayers Lake Business Park, Halifax, Nova Scotia

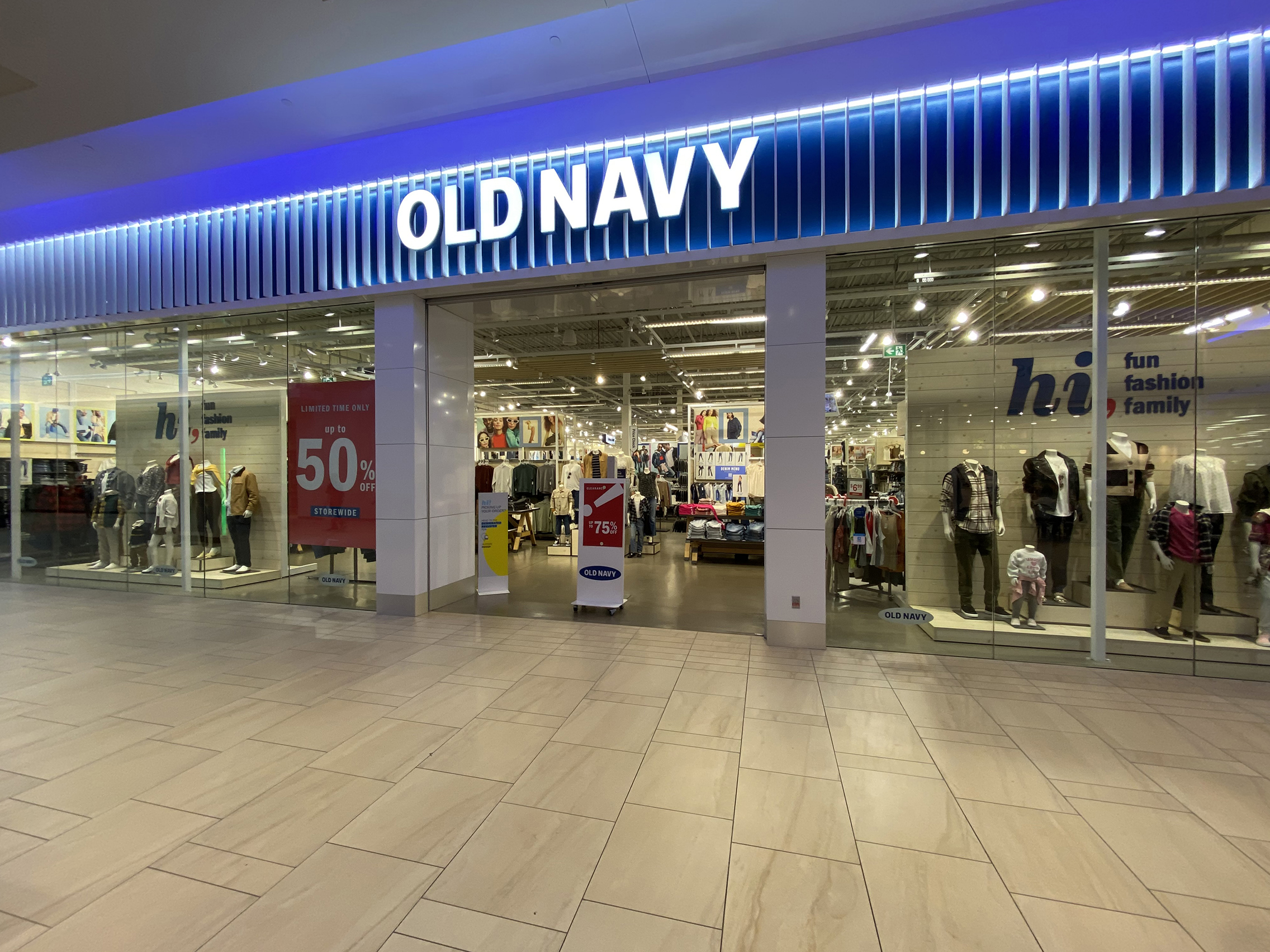
An Old Navy store in Richmond Hill, Ontario

In the early 1990s, Dayton-Hudson Corporation (then the parent company of Target, Mervyn's, Dayton's, Hudson's, and Marshall Field's) looked to establish a new division branded as a less expensive version of Gap called Everyday Hero; Gap's then-CEO Millard "Mickey" Drexler responded by opening Gap Warehouse in existing Gap outlet locations in 1993. On March 11, 1994, Gap Warehouse was renamed Old Navy Clothing Co. to establish a separate image from Gap. The name was conceived after the other original proposed names, Monorail and Forklift, were disliked by Drexler, and decided upon the new name after seeing a building with the two words on it during a visit to Paris. The new stores were about 15,000 square feet (1,400 m^{2}), compared to less than 10,000 square feet (900 m^{2}) for Gap Warehouse stores. On March 11, 1994, the first Old Navy locations opened in the northern California towns of Colma, San Leandro and Pittsburg. According to Kevin Lonergan, Gap's Director of Stores, Old Navy stores were intentionally designed like grocery stores, with flowing aisles, shopping carts, and small impulse items near the checkout counters. The cement floor, metal shelving, and checkout counters built from polished pressed board and galvanized metal gave the stores an industrial warehouse feel, while the colorful arrangements and large number of employees working set it apart from other discount clothing stores. Later that year, 42 other Old Navy stores opened, and most of the 45 Gap Warehouse stores were renamed Old Navy.

Previously, Old Navy had campy television ads featuring Carrie Donovan, Morgan Fairchild, and a canine mascot, Magic.

The Old Navy division grew quickly; in 1997, it became the first retailer to pass $1 billion in its first four years in business, and opened 500 stores by 2000. In 2001, Old Navy began its international expansion with the opening of 12 stores in Ontario, Canada.

Thus, the brand also experimented, opening a coffee shop inside one location in San Francisco in December 1995, and opening an Old Navy Kids location in Littleton, Colorado, in April 1997. This in turn did not work out for the company, and was terminated the following September.

The third Old Navy logo, used from 2005 through 2009

In 2005, Old Navy's then-president Dawn Robertson looked to address the competition she saw in Hollister Co. and American Eagle Outfitters by rebranding the division with a "high fashion feel". In addition to a new logo, several locations were built or remodeled to reflect the "New Old Navy"; one such location in St. Petersburg, Florida, cost roughly $5 million to develop. Unlike the traditional industrial warehouse style most Old Navy locations possess, the new stores were boutique in nature, featuring green building materials, rock gardens, large murals, and posters, as well as many mirrored and silver accents. Also, advertisements began to be created in-house, and substituted the original kitschy and humorous feel for a high fashion and feminine directive. These stores proved to be a disappointing investment, and Robertson was asked to leave the company.

In 2011, Old Navy began a second rebranding, known as Project ONE, to emphasize a family-oriented environment. It targeted Old Navy's target customer (the fictional "Jenny", a married mother of at least one child) and featured better lighting, vibrant colors, layouts that make shopping easier, quick-change stations, and a more efficient cash wrap design. By July 12, 2011, one-third of the company's North American locations had adopted the redesign.

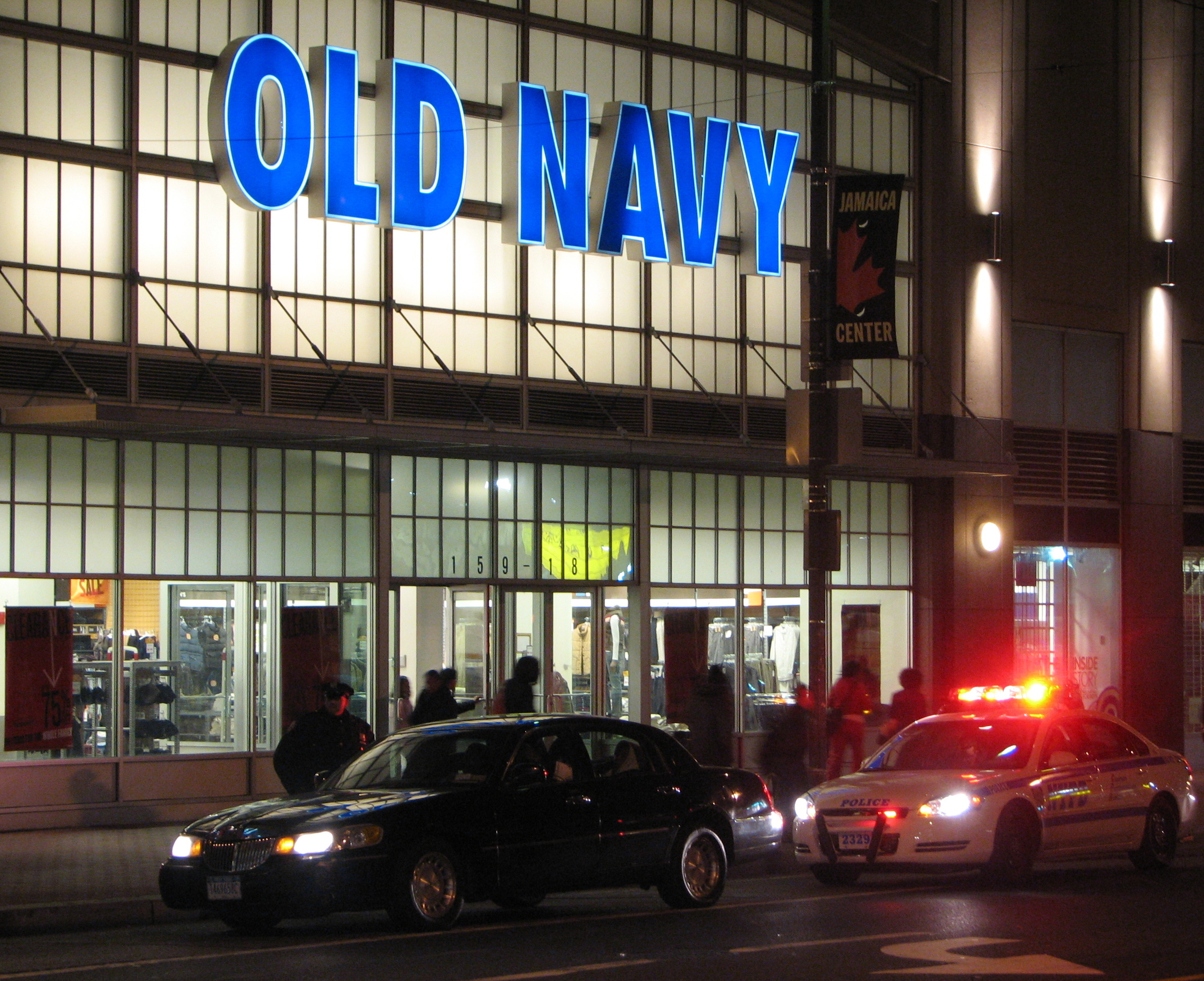
An Old Navy neon sign logo in Queens, New York

In 2012, after several years of Old Navy losing sales to rival retailer H&M, Gap Inc. hired H&M executive Stefan Larsson to run its Old Navy division. Larsson instituted a number of changes, including hiring designers away from Coach, Nike, Reebok, and North Face to design exclusive Old Navy clothing. By 2015, Old Navy's yearly sales had reached $6 billion per year in the US, almost equaling those of Gap Inc.'s Gap and Banana Republic divisions combined. Larsson left the company to join Ralph Lauren in 2015 and was replaced by current President and CEO, Sonia Syngal. Since at least 2013, Old Navy (as part of Gap Inc.) has been a member of the advocacy coalition Business for Innovative Climate and Energy Policy (BICEP) organized by the nonprofit advocacy organization Ceres.

On October 26, 2017, Old Navy opened two new flagship stores (one in Times Square, Manhattan, New York City). The Times Square flagship featured extended store hours and significantly more retail space than the usual Old Navy location.

On April 23, 2018, a customer, Saudia Scott filed a multi-million dollar lawsuit against Old Navy and its parent company Gap Inc. The lawsuit states that on July 25, 2016, Old Navy manager Megan Yost watched and assisted Scott with her purchases at the Old Navy store located in Abingdon, Maryland. As Scott walked to her car, two police officers followed, detained and returned Scott to inside the store after Yost initially contacted police, accusing Ms. Scott of theft and shoplifting (although Yost later assisted Scott with purchasing the items). The police, having already been notified but not aware that Scott's purchases had actually occurred before their arrival, approached Scott in the parking lot and arrested her. Manager Yost was terminated almost immediately as a result. A jury trial was scheduled for June 2023. However, Scott received a summary judgment which, although overturned, was reinstated in July 2022.

A class action lawsuit was brought against Old Navy for misleading sales pricing and false advertising. The lead plaintiff, Anastasha Barba, brought the suit in San Francisco County, California, and the class action resulted in a settlement for most US purchasers involved between 2015 and 2021 (although those in Missouri were not eligible). The suit alleged that Old Navy's signage and website indicated some merchandise's sale prices but that the prices were actually the regular prices, influencing shoppers to purchase items at lower than usual prices, even though the prices were not lower.

In 2019, Gap Inc. announced that Old Navy would exit China in 2020.

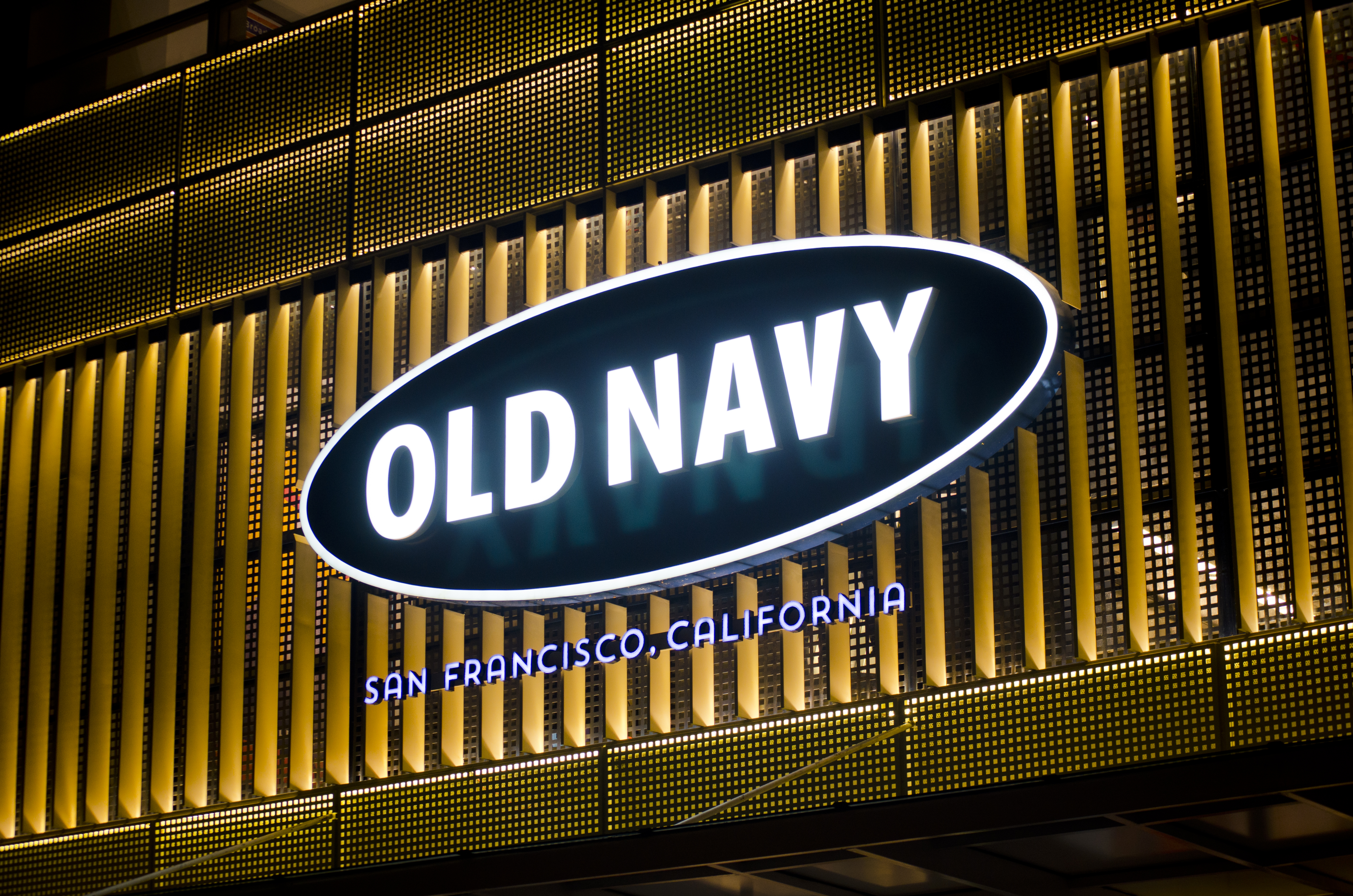
The Old Navy flagship store in the Philippines was opened on March 22, 2014, located at Bonifacio Global City.

On February 28, 2019, Gap Inc. announced that Old Navy and Gap Inc. would split, becoming two companies. The move was designed to enable the consolidation of the company's older brands, like GAP and Banana, with its newer Athleta and Hill City. This decision was reversed on January 16, 2020, when Gap Inc. announced that the separation had been aborted.

== Awards ==
- In 2013, Gap Inc. ranked 5th among specialty retailers in the list of World's Most Admired.
- Old Navy was on Fortune's Great Place to Work list in 2016, 2017 and 2018
