= Long Beach Motorsports Walk of Fame =

Coordinates: 33°45′53″N 118°11′32″W

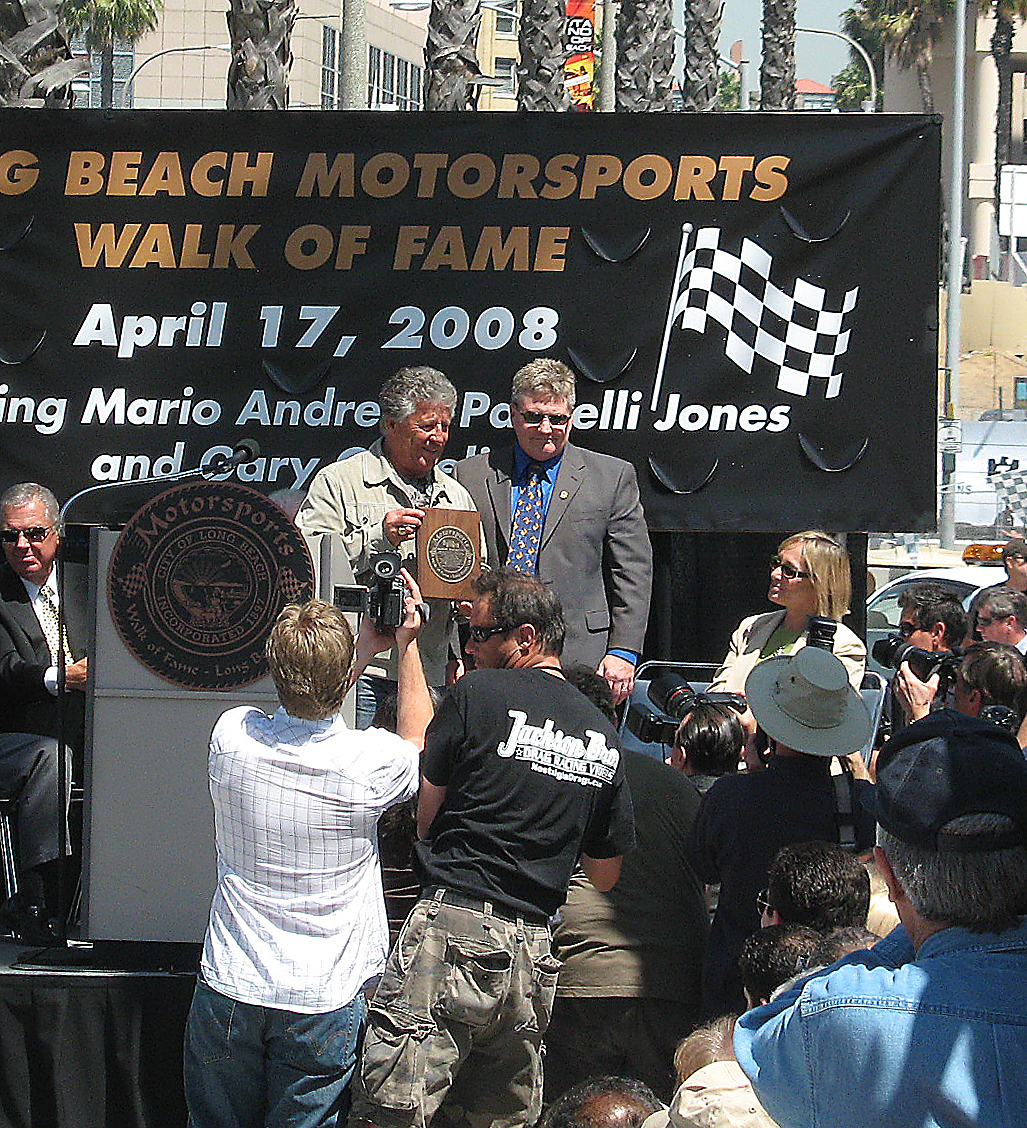
City of Long Beach City Manager Pat West presenting Long Beach Motorsports Walk of Fame plaque to Mario Andretti on April 17, 2008

The Long Beach Motorsports Walk of Fame is a walk of fame located on South Pine Avenue in the downtown waterfront area of Long Beach, California, to recognize those who have made a major contribution to auto racing in Long Beach. The project was conceived in late 2005 through talks between the Economic Development Bureau of the City of Long Beach and officials in order to improve and strengthen the city's ties with the open-wheel car racing event, the Grand Prix of Long Beach. It earned support from elected officials, local government and business and auto racing enthusiasts, and was officially dedicated in a ceremony led by Beverly O'Neill, the Long Beach mayor, on April 6, 2006. The Redevelopment Agency of Long Beach provided development funding for the Walk of Fame, and the project set out to inform the public about Long Beach's contribution to auto racing.

Each year, two or three auto racing figures are inducted following a vote by an informal group of individuals such as local officials and Long Beach Grand Prix Association members. A 22 in (1.8 ft) bronze medallion plaque, depicting a rendition of each inductee's car and listing their greatest achievements in auto racing, is permanently embedded in the palm-lined concrete sidewalk. The medallions proceed up the sidewalk's center alongside the Grand Prix of Long Beach race circuit in front of the Long Beach Convention Center. Members are inducted at a ceremony held outside the Long Beach Convention Center in the week of the Grand Prix; drivers and their families receive a 6 in (0.50 ft) and 3 in (0.25 ft) bronze medallion replica from Long Beach's mayor. Mark Vaughn of Autoweek described it as "a venue somewhat similar to the Hollywood Walk of Fame".

A total of 44 people from the world of motorsports have been inducted since 2006. The two inaugural members, Dan Gurney and Phil Hill, were inducted in 2006. All but 15 inductees are from the United States. In 2019, Sébastien Bourdais and Will Power were the first two active IndyCar Series participants to be added to the Walk of Fame. Only two people have been posthumously inducted, Gary Gabelich, the former world land speed record holder in 2008, and city of Long Beach mayor Bob Foster in 2026. Katherine Legge became the first woman to be inducted in 2024. There have been three racing teams added to the Walk of Fame. In 2007, Newman/Haas Racing, who were considered one of the most successful squads in Long Beach Grand Prix history, became the first team added to the Walk of Fame; the two other teams are Chip Ganassi Racing, inducted in 2011, and Galles Racing, who was added the following year. Bruce Flanders, Gerald Forsythe, Kevin Kalkhoven, Roger Penske and Christopher Pook, O'Neill, Jim Michaelian and Foster are the eight non-drivers who are members of the Walk of Fame. The two most recent inductees were Foster and two-time Long Beach Grand Prix winner Alexander Rossi in 2026.

== Inductees ==
Key
†	Indicates posthumous induction

Inductees of the Long Beach Motorsports Walk of Fame
Inductee	Nationality	Year	Notes	Refs
Dan Gurney	United States	2006	Formula One, IndyCar, NASCAR, and sports car driver and team owner and Grand Prix of Long Beach co-founder	
Phil Hill	United States	2006	1961 Formula One World Champion and 24 Hours of Le Mans, 12 Hours of Sebring winner	
Newman/Haas Racing	United States	2007	One of the most successful teams at the Grand Prix of Long Beach	
Christopher Pook	United States	2007	Co-founder of the Grand Prix of Long Beach and Grand Prix Association of Long Beach president and CEO	
Brian Redman	United Kingdom	2007	1975 Long Beach Grand Prix winner and 13-time Formula One Grand Prix starter	
Mario Andretti	United States	2008	Formula One, IndyCar, Indianapolis 500, 24 Hours of Daytona, 12 Hours of Sebring, Long Beach GP and Daytona 500 champion	
Gary Gabelich†	United States	2008	Dragster and stock car driver who set the world land speed record on the Bonneville Salt Flats in 1970	
Parnelli Jones	United States	2008	1963 Indianapolis 500, midget car, NASCAR, off-road and sprint car winner	
Bobby Rahal	United States	2009	Indianapolis 500, CART and Sports Car Club of America champion and 24 Hours of Daytona and 12 Hours of Sebring winner	
Al Unser Jr.	United States	2009	Two-time Indianapolis 500, International Race of Champions, CART champion, Grand Prix of Long Beach and 24 Hours of Daytona winner	
Michael Andretti	United States	2010	1991 CART champion and two-time Grand Prix of Long Beach winner	
Danny Sullivan	United States	2010	1985 Indianapolis 500 winner, 1988 CART champion and 1992 Grand Prix of Long Beach winner	
Chip Ganassi Racing	United States	2011	Five-time Grand Prix of Long Beach winning team	
Jimmy Vasser	United States	2011	Long Beach Grand Prix driver and winner owner, 1996 CART champion and 2010 Toyota Pro/Celebrity Race winner in the Pro class	
Galles Racing	United States	2012	Five-time Grand Prix of Long Beach winning team	
Scott Pruett	United States	2012	Pruett drove a wide variety of vehicles, and won at Long Beach in each of Trans-Am and Grand-Am	
Adrián Fernández	Mexico	2013	2009 American Le Mans Series at Long Beach class winner and helped increase Hispanic/Latino presence at the Long Beach Grand Prix	
Paul Tracy	Canada	2013	Four-time Grand Prix of Long Beach winner and 2003 CART champion	
Gerald Forsythe	United States	2014	Won the Long Beach Grand Prix twice and the support Atlantic Championship round four times as a car owner	
Dario Franchitti	United Kingdom	2014	Four-time IndyCar Series champion and winner of both the Long Beach Grand Prix and the Indianapolis 500	
Kevin Kalkhoven	Australia	2014	Won the 2008 Grand Prix of Long Beach and the 2005 Long Beach Atlantic Championship race as a car owner	
Robby Gordon	United States	2015	Winner in each of IndyCar, NASCAR, sports car and off-road racing	
Bryan Herta	United States	2015	Won the 1993 Indy Lights Championship and won the 2011 Indianapolis 500 as a car owner	
Bruce Flanders	United States	2016	Since 1978, Flanders has announced the Grand Prix of Long Beach and short track events	
Roger Penske	United States	2016	Penske had led Team Penske to 16 Indianapolis 500 wins, 177 race victories, and 13 IndyCar titles at the time of induction	
Emerson Fittipaldi	Brazil	2017	Two-time Formula One and Indianapolis 500 champion, and the 1989 CART winner with 40 race wins in both series	
Tommy Kendall	United States	2017	Sports and stock car driver who won multiple Trans-Am Series Championship titles and the IMSA GTU Series Championship	
Hélio Castroneves	Brazil	2018	Won the 2001 Grand Prix of Long Beach and the Indianapolis 500 three times	
Juan Pablo Montoya	Colombia	2018	Clinched the 1999 Grand Prix of Long Beach en route to claiming the 1999 CART tile and won the Indianapolis 500 twice	
Sébastien Bourdais	France	2019	Four-time Champ Car World Series champion and three-time Long Beach race winner	
Will Power	Australia	2019	Two-time Long Beach Grand Prix winner, and the 2014 IndyCar Series and 2018 Indianapolis 500 champion	
Oriol Servià	Spain	2020 (Note: Ribbs and Servià had their induction ceremony in September 2021.)	1999 Indy Lights champion and CART, American Le Mans Series, Grand-Am and Formula E driver	
Willy T. Ribbs	United States	2020	Formula Atlantic, IMSA, and NASCAR driver who was the first African American to qualify for the Indianapolis 500 in 1991	
Bill Auberlen	United States	2022	Two-time class Long Beach sports car race winner who won 63 times in IMSA competition at the time of induction	
Alex Zanardi	Italy	2022	Two-time CART, Long Beach Grand Prix champion, 15 wins in American open-wheel racing, and Paralympic handcycling champion	
James Hinchcliffe	Canada	2023	Won the 2010 Indy Lights race at Long Beach and the 2017 Toyota Grand Prix of Long Beach	
Ryan Hunter-Reay	United States	2023	Winner of the 2010 Toyota Grand Prix of Long Beach, the 2012 IndyCar Series title and the 2014 Indianapolis 500	
Katherine Legge	United Kingdom	2024	First woman to win a major North American open-wheel car race with her victory in the 2005 Long Beach Atlantic Championship event and was the first female Champ Car race leader in 2006.	
Takuma Sato	Japan	2024	Two-time Indianapolis 500 winner who won the 2013 Grand Prix of Long Beach, becoming the first Japanese racer to win an IndyCar Series event.	
Scott Dixon	New Zealand	2025	Six-time IndyCar Series champion and two-time Grand Prix of Long Beach winner in 2015 and 2024	
Jim Michaelian	United States	2025	President and CEO of the Grand Prix Association of Long Beach	
Beverly O'Neill	United States	2025	Former mayor of the City of Long Beach from 1994 to 2006	
Alexander Rossi	United States	2026	Two-time Grand Prix of Long Beach winner and 2016 Indianapolis 500 champion	
Bob Foster†	United States	2026	Mayor of the City of Long Beach from 2006 to 2014	

=== By nationality ===
Inductees by nationality
Nationality	Inductees
United States	28
United Kingdom	3
Australia	2
Brazil	2
Canada	2
Colombia	1
France	1
Italy	1
Japan	1
Mexico	1
New Zealand	1
Spain	1

== See also ==
- International Drag Racing Hall of Fame
- International Motorsports Hall of Fame
- Motorsports Hall of Fame of America
- NASCAR Hall of Fame
