= 1994 Long Beach, California, mayoral election =

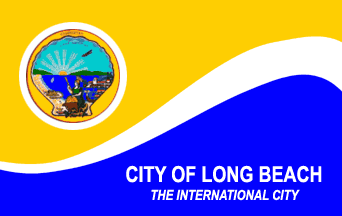
- April 12, 1994

Candidate	Beverly O'Neill	Ray Grabinksi	Frank Colonna
Party	Nonpartisan	Nonpartisan	Nonpartisan
Popular vote	11,505	10,217	8,966
Percentage	23.0%	20.4%	17.9%
Candidate	Jeffrey A. Kellogg	Ernie Kell	Don Westerland
Party	Nonpartisan	Nonpartisan	Nonpartisan
Popular vote	7,974	5,281	2,823
Percentage	15.9%	10.5%	5.6%
Mayor before election
Ernie Kell
Nonpartisan
Elected mayor
Beverly O'Neill
Nonpartisan

Long Beach, California, held an election for Mayor of Long Beach, California, on April 12, 1994. It saw the election of Beverly O'Neill. The incumbent mayor, Ernie Kell, placed fifth.
