= 2010 Long Beach, California mayoral election =

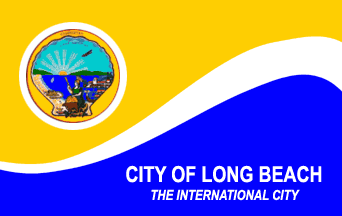
- April 13, 2010
- Turnout: 15.96%
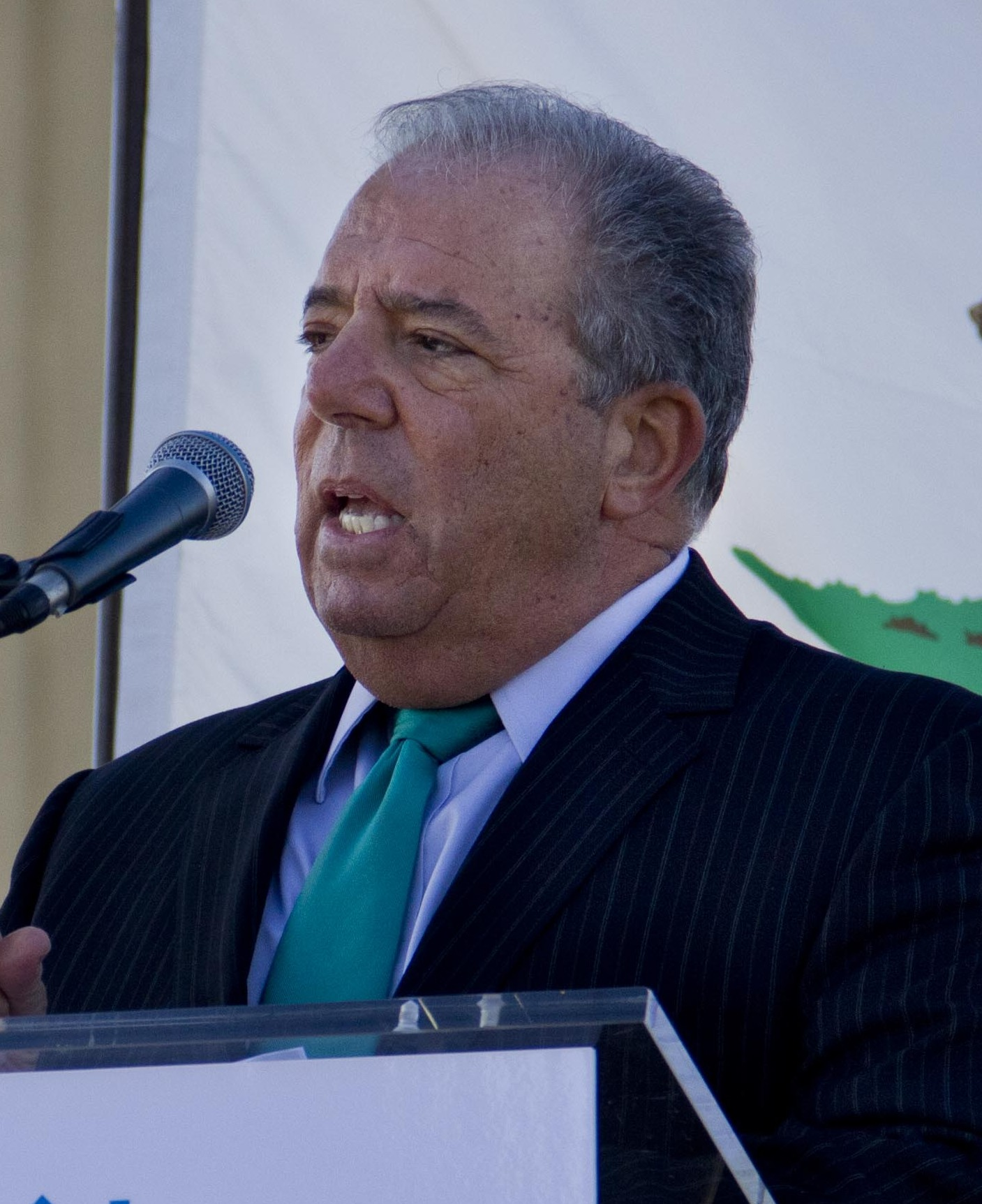

Candidate	Bob Foster	Stevie Merino
Popular vote	30,326	5,741
Percentage	84.08%	15.92%
Mayor before election
Bob Foster
Nonpartisan
Elected mayor
Bob Foster

Long Beach, California, held an election for Mayor of Long Beach, California, on April 13, 2010. It saw the reelection of Bob Foster.

Municipal elections in California are officially non-partisan.

== Results ==
Results
Candidate	Votes	%
Bob Foster (incumbent)	30,326	84.08
Stevie Merino	5,741	15.92
Total votes	36,067	
