= 2006 Long Beach, California, mayoral election =

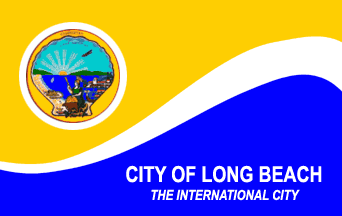
- April 11, 2006 (first round); June 6, 2006 (runoff)
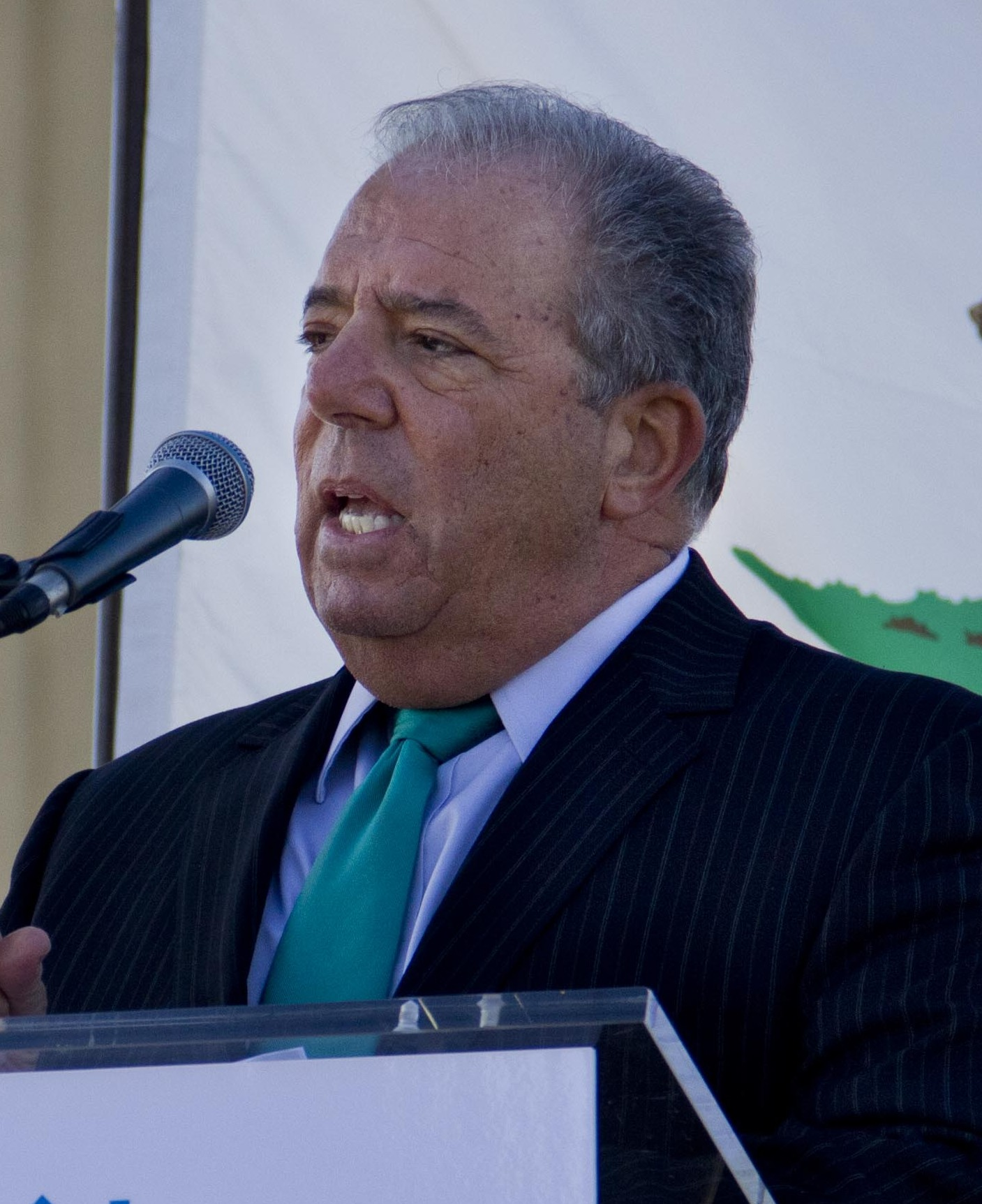

Candidate	Bob Foster	Frank Colonna	Doug Drummond
Party	Nonpartisan	Nonpartisan	Nonpartisan
First-round vote	20,999	12,348	8,271
First-round percentage	48.5%	28.5%	19.1%
Second-round vote	32,298	24,287
Second-round percentage	57.0%	42.9%
Mayor before election
Beverly O'Neill
Nonpartisan
Elected mayor
Bob Foster
Nonpartisan

Long Beach, California, held an election for Mayor of Long Beach, California, on April 11, 2006 and June 6, 2006. It saw the election of Bob Foster.

== Results ==
=== First round ===
First round results
Candidate	Votes	%
Bob Foster	20,999	48.5
Frank Colonna	12,348	28.5
Doug Drummond	8,271	19.1
Ronnie Rephan	976	2.2
John P. Stolpe	642	1.4
Write-ins	290	0.6
Total votes	43,526	

=== Runoff ===
Runoff results
Candidate	Votes	%
Bob Foster	32,298	57.0
Frank Colonna	24,287	42.9
Write-ins	455	0.7
Total votes	57,040	
