= California's 18th congressional district =

U.S. House district for California

Coordinates: 37.2°N 121°W

- Interactive map of district boundaries
- Representative: Zoe Lofgren; D–San Jose
- Population (2025): 754,277
- Median household income: $109,067
- Ethnicity: 65.3% Hispanic; 18.4% White; 10.9% Asian; 2.5% Two or more races; 1.9% Black; 1.0% other
- Cook PVI: D+17

California's 18th congressional district is a congressional district located in the U.S. state of California. The district is currently represented by Democrat Zoe Lofgren. Since the 2022 election, the district is landlocked and includes all of San Benito County and parts of Santa Clara, Monterey, and Santa Cruz counties, including Salinas, Hollister, Watsonville, Gilroy, Soledad, and downtown and eastern San Jose.

== History ==
=== 2020 redistricting ===
Following the 2020 census and the subsequent 2020 United States redistricting cycle, California lost a congressional district, leading to significant changes across California's districts. Most of the area previously part of the 18th district was split into the new 16th district and 19th district. The 18th district was moved to cover the Salinas Valley in Monterey County and the downtown and east side of San Jose. With the changes, the 18th became a Latino majority district.

=== 2010 redistricting ===
Following the 2010 census and the subsequent 2010 United States redistricting cycle, California's 18th congressional district was redrawn by the California Citizens Redistricting Commission. Cities and CDPs in the district included Palo Alto, Stanford, Los Altos, Woodside, Mountain View, Los Altos Hills, Campbell, Saratoga, Los Gatos, and Scotts Valley; most of Menlo Park and Redwood City; and part of San Jose.

=== 2000 redistricting ===
Following the 2000 census and the subsequent 2000 United States redistricting cycle, California's congressional districts were redrawn by the California State Legislature. From 2003 to 2013, the district was located in the San Joaquin Valley. It included Merced County and portions of San Joaquin, Stanislaus, Madera, and Fresno counties. Cities in the district included Modesto, most of Stockton, Ceres, Atwater, Merced, and Los Banos.

== Recent election results from statewide races ==
=== 2023–2027 boundaries ===
Year	Office	Results
2008	President	Obama 71% - 28%
2010	Governor	Brown 63% - 32%
2010	Lt. Governor	Newsom 57% - 34%
2010	Secretary of State	Bowen 62% - 28%
2010	Attorney General	Harris 57% - 33%
2010	Treasurer	Lockyer 66% - 26%
2010	Controller	Chiang 62% - 27%
2012	President	Obama 74% - 26%
2014	Governor	Brown 72% - 28%
2016	President	Clinton 71% - 23%
2018	Governor	Newsom 69% - 31%
2018	Attorney General	Becerra 71% - 29%
2020	President	Biden 71% - 27%
2022	Senate (Reg.)	Padilla 68% - 32%
2022	Governor	Newsom 65% - 35%
2022	Lt. Governor	Kounalakis 66% - 34%
2022	Secretary of State	Weber 66% - 34%
2022	Attorney General	Bonta 66% - 34%
2022	Treasurer	Ma 65% - 35%
2022	Controller	Cohen 63% - 37%
2024	President	Harris 63% - 34%
2024	Senate (Reg.)	Schiff 65% - 35%

=== 2027–2033 boundaries ===
Year	Office	Results
2008	President	Obama 71% - 28%
2010	Governor	Brown 63% - 32%
2010	Lt. Governor	Newsom 57% - 34%
2010	Secretary of State	Bowen 62% - 28%
2010	Attorney General	Harris 57% - 33%
2010	Treasurer	Lockyer 66% - 26%
2010	Controller	Chiang 62% - 27%
2012	President	Obama 74% - 26%
2014	Governor	Brown 72% - 28%
2016	President	Clinton 71% - 23%
2018	Governor	Newsom 69% - 31%
2018	Attorney General	Becerra 71% - 29%
2020	President	Biden 71% - 27%
2022	Senate (Reg.)	Padilla 68% - 32%
2022	Governor	Newsom 65% - 35%
2022	Lt. Governor	Kounalakis 66% - 34%
2022	Secretary of State	Weber 66% - 34%
2022	Attorney General	Bonta 66% - 34%
2022	Treasurer	Ma 65% - 35%
2022	Controller	Cohen 63% - 37%
2024	President	Harris 63% - 34%
2024	Senate (Reg.)	Schiff 65% - 35%

== Composition ==
FIPS County Code	County	Seat	Population
53	Monterey	Salinas	430,723
69	San Benito	Hollister	68,175
81	San Mateo	Redwood City	737,888
85	Santa Clara	San Jose	1,877,592
87	Santa Cruz	Santa Cruz	261,547

Under the 2020 redistricting, California's 18th congressional district was shifted geographically to cover the Salinas Valley. It encompasses San Benito County, the southernmost point of Santa Cruz County, and the interiors of Santa Clara and Monterey Counties. The area in Santa Cruz County includes most of the city of Watsonville; and the census-designated places Interlaken, Amesti, and Freedom. The area in Santa Clara County includes the center of the city of San Jose; part of the San Jose district of Alum Rock; the cities of Morgan Hill and Gilroy; and the census-designated places East Foothills and San Martin. The area in Monterey County includes the cities of Salinas, Soledad, Greenfield, King City, and Gonzales; the north side of the census-designated place Prunedale; and the census-designated places Aromas (shared with San Benito County), Pajaro, Las Lomas, Boronda, Chualar, Pine Canyon, San Lucas, San Ardo, Lockwood, and Fort Hunter Liggett.

Santa Cruz County is split between this district and the 19th district. They are partitioned by Pajaro River, Highway 129, W Beach St, Lee Rd, Highway 1, Harkins Slough Rd, Harkins Slough, Old Adobe Rd, Corralitos Creek, Varin Rd, Pioneer Rd, Green Valley Rd, Casserly Rd, Mt Madonna Rd.

Santa Clara County is split between this district, the 19th district, the 16th district, and the 17th district. The 18th, 16th, and 19th are partitioned by Bella Vista Ln, Bodfish Creek, Burchell Rd, Bluebell Dr, Day Rd, Highway G8, W San Martin Ave, Santa Teresa Blvd, Sunnyside Ave, Morgan Hill City Limits, Hale Ave, Tilton Ave, Monterey Rd, Highway 101, Coyote Rd, Anderson Lake, Las Animas Rd, Metcalf Rd, Yerba Buena Creek, Old Yerba Buena Rd, Aborn Rd, Quincy Rd, Norwood Ave, Murillo Ave, Pleasant Acres Dr, Westview Dr, Pleasant Knoll Dr, Guluzzo Dr, Flint Ave, Marten Ave, Coldwater Dr, Ocala Ave, Wonderama Dr, Cunningham Ave, Swift Ave, Highway 101, Story Rd, Monterey Rd, Highway 87, Highway 280, Highway 880. The 18th and 17th are partitioned by Steven's Creek Blvd, Di Salvo Ave, Bellerose Dr, Forest Ave, Wabash Ave, W San Carlos St, Race St, The Alameda, University Ave, Elm St, Highway 82, Newhall St, Morse St, Idaho St, Alameda Ct, Sherwood Ave, Hamline St, Highway 880, Highway 101, McKee Rd, Toyon Ave, Penitencia Creek Rd, Canon Vista Ave, Crothers Rd, Alum Rock Park, Sierra Rd, Felter Rd, Weller Rd.

Monterey County is split between this district and the 19th district. They are partitioned by Union Pacific, Highway G12, Elkhorn Rd, Echo Valley Rd, Maher Rd, Maher Ct, La Encina Dr, Crazy Horse Canyon Rd, San Juan Grade Rd, Highway 101, Espinosa Rd, Castroville Blvd, Highway 156, Highway 1, Tembladero Slough, Highway 183, Cooper Rd, Blanco Rd, Salinas River, Davis Rd, Hitchcock Rd, Highway 68, E Blanco Rd, Nutting St, Abbott St, Highway G17, Limekiln Creek, Likekiln Rd, Rana Creek, Tularcitos Creek, Highway G16, Tassajara Rd, Camp Creek, Lost Valley Creek, Lost Valley Conn, N Coast Rdg, 2 Central Coa, Cone Peak Rd, Nacimiento Fergusson Rd, Los Bueyes Creek, and the Monterey County Southern border.

=== Cities and CDPs with 10,000 or more people ===
- San Jose – 971,233
- Salinas – 163,542
- Gilroy – 58,101
- Watsonville – 52,590
- Morgan Hill – 45,483
- Hollister – 41,678
- Soledad – 24,925
- Greenfield – 18,937
- Prunedale – 18,885
- Greenfield – 17,516
- King City – 13,332
- Alum Rock – 12,042

=== 2,500 – 10,000 people ===
- Gonzales – 8,647
- Castroville – 7,515
- Interlaken – 7,368
- San Martin – 7,027
- East Foothills – 6,803
- Freedom – 3,835
- Ridgemark – 3,212
- Las Lomas – 3,046
- Pajaro – 2,882
- Aromas – 2,708
- Amesti – 2,637

== Future composition ==
Beginning with the 2026 election, the 18th district will consist of the following counties:

- Fresno (part)
- Kings (part)
- Monterey (part)
- San Benito
- Santa Clara (part)
- Santa Cruz (part)

== List of members representing the district ==
Member	Party	Dates	Cong ress(es)	Electoral history	Counties
District created March 4, 1933
John H. Burke (Long Beach)	Democratic	March 4, 1933 – January 3, 1935	73rd	Elected in 1932. Retired.	1933–1963; Los Angeles County
Byron N. Scott (Long Beach)	Democratic	January 3, 1935 – January 3, 1939	74th 75th	Elected in 1934. Re-elected in 1936. Lost re-election.	1933–1963; Los Angeles County
Thomas M. Eaton (Long Beach)	Republican	January 3, 1939 – September 16, 1939	76th	Elected in 1938. Died.	1933–1963; Los Angeles County
Vacant		September 16, 1939 – January 3, 1941	76th		1933–1963; Los Angeles County
William Ward Johnson (Long Beach)	Republican	January 3, 1941 – January 3, 1945	77th 78th	Elected in 1940. Re-elected in 1942. Lost re-election.	1933–1963; Los Angeles County
Clyde Doyle (Long Beach)	Democratic	January 3, 1945 – January 3, 1947	79th	Elected in 1944. Lost re-election.	1933–1963; Los Angeles County
Willis W. Bradley (Long Beach)	Republican	January 3, 1947 – January 3, 1949	80th	Elected in 1946. Lost re-election.	1933–1963; Los Angeles County
Clyde Doyle (Long Beach)	Democratic	January 3, 1949 – January 3, 1953	81st 82nd	Elected again in 1948. Re-elected in 1950. Redistricted to the 23rd district.	1933–1963; Los Angeles County
Craig Hosmer (Long Beach)	Republican	January 3, 1953 – January 3, 1963	83rd 84th 85th 86th 87th	Elected in 1952. Re-elected in 1954. Re-elected in 1956. Re-elected in 1958. Re-elected in 1960. Redistricted to the 32nd district.	1933–1963; Los Angeles County
Harlan Hagen (Hanford)	Democratic	January 3, 1963 – January 3, 1967	88th 89th	Redistricted from the 14th district and re-elected in 1962. Re-elected in 1964. Lost re-election.	1963–1967; Kern County, Kings County, Tulare County
Bob Mathias (Tulare)	Republican	January 3, 1967 – January 3, 1975	90th 91st 92nd 93rd	Elected in 1966. Re-elected in 1968. Re-elected in 1970. Re-elected in 1972. Redistricted to the 17th district and lost re-election.	1967–1973; Kern County, Tulare County
Bob Mathias (Tulare)	Republican	January 3, 1967 – January 3, 1975	90th 91st 92nd 93rd	Elected in 1966. Re-elected in 1968. Re-elected in 1970. Re-elected in 1972. Redistricted to the 17th district and lost re-election.	1973–1975; Amador County, Calaveras County, Inyo County, Kern County (sliver in north), Madera County, Mariposa County, Mono County, Tulare County, Tuolumne County
William M. Ketchum (Bakersfield)	Republican	January 3, 1975 – June 24, 1978	94th 95th	Redistricted from the 36th district and re-elected in 1974. Re-elected in 1976. Died.	Inyo County, Kern County, northern Los Angeles County, Tulare County
Vacant		June 24, 1978 – January 3, 1979	95th		Inyo County, Kern County, northern Los Angeles County, Tulare County
Bill Thomas (Bakersfield)	Republican	January 3, 1979 – January 3, 1983	96th 97th	Elected in 1978. Re-elected in 1980. Redistricted to the 20th district.	Inyo County, Kern County, northern Los Angeles County, Tulare County
Richard Lehman (Fresno)	Democratic	January 3, 1983 – January 3, 1993	98th 99th 100th 101st 102nd	Elected in 1982. Re-elected in 1984. Re-elected in 1986. Re-elected in 1988. Re-elected in 1990. Redistricted to the 19th district.	1983–1993; Calaveras County, Fresno County (Fresno city), Madera County, Mono County, eastern San Joaquin County, Tuolumne County
Gary Condit (Ceres)	Democratic	January 3, 1993 – January 3, 2003	103rd 104th 105th 106th 107th	Redistricted from the 15th district and re-elected in 1992. Re-elected in 1994. Re-elected in 1996. Re-elected in 1998. Re-elected in 2000. Lost renomination.	1993–2003; Northwestern Fresno County, western Madera County, Merced County, southwestern San Joaquin County, Stanislaus County
Dennis Cardoza (Atwater)	Democratic	January 3, 2003 – August 14, 2012	108th 109th 110th 111th 112th	Elected in 2002. Re-elected in 2004. Re-elected in 2006. Re-elected in 2008. Re-elected in 2010. Resigned to become a lobbyist.	2003–2013 Small part of western Fresno County, Merced County, San Joaquin County (Stockton), western Stanislaus County
Vacant		August 14, 2012 – January 3, 2013	112th	Redistricted to the 10th district	2003–2013 Small part of western Fresno County, Merced County, San Joaquin County (Stockton), western Stanislaus County
Anna Eshoo (Atherton)	Democratic	January 3, 2013 – January 3, 2023	113th 114th 115th 116th 117th	Redistricted from the 14th district and re-elected in 2012. Re-elected in 2014. Re-elected in 2016. Re-elected in 2018. Re-elected in 2020. Redistricted to the 16th district.	2013–2023 Portions of San Mateo, Santa Clara, and Santa Cruz
Zoe Lofgren (San Jose)	Democratic	January 3, 2023 – present	118th 119th	Redistricted from the 19th district and re-elected in 2022. Re-elected in 2024. Re-elected in 2026.	2023–present Much of Santa Clara County, including most of the city of San Jose

== Election results ==
=== 1932 ===
1932 United States House of Representatives elections in California
Party	Candidate	Votes	%
Democratic	John H. Burke	48,179	53.3
Republican	Robert Henderson	33,817	37.4
Independent	William E. Hinshaw	8,399	9.3
Total votes		90,395	100.0
Turnout			
Democratic win (new seat)			

=== 1934 ===
1934 United States House of Representatives elections in California
Party	Candidate	Votes	%
Democratic	Byron N. Scott	52,377	56.3
Republican	William Brayton	40,179	43.2
Communist	Clyde Champion	507	0.5
Total votes		93,063	100.0
Turnout			
Democratic hold			

=== 1936 ===
1936 United States House of Representatives elections in California
Party	Candidate	Votes	%
Democratic	Byron N. Scott (incumbent)	61,415	59
Republican	James F. Collins	42,748	41
Total votes		134,163	100
Turnout			
Democratic hold			

=== 1938 ===
1938 United States House of Representatives elections in California
Party	Candidate	Votes	%
Republican	Thomas M. Eaton	52,216	48.6
Democratic	Byron N. Scott (incumbent)	51,874	48.3
Progressive Party (United States, 1924)	Solomon Carr	3,384	3.1
Total votes		107,474	100.0
Turnout			
Republican gain from Democratic			

=== 1940 ===
1940 United States House of Representatives elections in California
Party	Candidate	Votes	%
Republican	William Ward Johnson (inc.)	73,932	54.4
Democratic	Byron N. Scott	60,764	44.7
Communist	George R. Ashby	1,355	0.9
Total votes		136,051	100.0
Turnout			
Republican hold			

=== 1942 ===
United States House of Representatives elections, 1942
Party	Candidate	Votes	%
Republican	William Ward Johnson (inc.)	53,136	56.8
Democratic	Francis H. Gentry	40,339	43.2
Total votes		93,475	100.0
Turnout			
Republican hold			

=== 1944 ===
1944 United States House of Representatives elections in California
Party	Candidate	Votes	%
Democratic	Clyde Doyle	95,090	55.7
Republican	William Ward Johnson (inc.)	75,749	44.3
Total votes		170,839	100.0
Turnout			
Democratic gain from Republican			

=== 1946 ===
1946 United States House of Representatives elections in California
Party	Candidate	Votes	%
Republican	Willis W. Bradley	67,363	52.8
Democratic	Clyde Doyle (incumbent)	60,218	47.2
Total votes		127,581	100.0
Turnout			
Republican gain from Democratic			

=== 1948 ===
1948 United States House of Representatives elections in California
Party	Candidate	Votes	%
Democratic	Clyde Doyle	105,687	51.1
Republican	Willis W. Bradley (incumbent)	92,721	44.9
Progressive	Stanley Moffatt	8,232	4.0
Total votes		206,640	100.0
Turnout			
Democratic gain from Republican			

=== 1950 ===
1950 United States House of Representatives elections in California
Party	Candidate	Votes	%
Democratic	Clyde Doyle (incumbent)	97,177	50.5
Republican	Craig Hosmer	95,308	49.5
Total votes		192,485	100.0
Turnout			
Democratic hold			

=== 1952 ===
1952 United States House of Representatives elections in California
Party	Candidate	Votes	%
Republican	Craig Hosmer	90,438	55.5
Democratic	Joseph M. Kennick	72,457	44.5
Total votes		162,895	100.0
Turnout			
Republican win (new seat)			

=== 1954 ===
1954 United States House of Representatives elections in California
Party	Candidate	Votes	%
Republican	Craig Hosmer (incumbent)	71,731	55
Democratic	Joseph M. Kennick	58,647	45
Total votes		130,378	100
Turnout			
Republican hold			

=== 1956 ===
1956 United States House of Representatives elections in California
Party	Candidate	Votes	%
Republican	Craig Hosmer (incumbent)	103,108	59.3
Democratic	Raymond C. "Ray" Simpson	70,911	40.7
Total votes		174,019	100.0
Turnout			
Republican hold			

=== 1958 ===
1958 United States House of Representatives elections in California
Party	Candidate	Votes	%
Republican	Craig Hosmer (incumbent)	95,682	60
Democratic	Harry S. May	63,684	40
Total votes		159,366	100
Turnout			
Republican hold			

=== 1960 ===
1960 United States House of Representatives elections in California
Party	Candidate	Votes	%
Republican	Craig Hosmer (incumbent)	129,851	70
Democratic	D. Patrick Ahern	55,735	30
Total votes		185,586	100
Turnout			
Republican hold			

=== 1962 ===
1962 United States House of Representatives elections in California
Party	Candidate	Votes	%
Democratic	Harlan Hagen (incumbent)	91,684	58.9
Republican	G. Ray Arnett	64,037	41.1
Total votes		155,721	100.0
Turnout			
Democratic hold			

=== 1964 ===
1964 United States House of Representatives elections in California
Party	Candidate	Votes	%
Democratic	Harlan Hagen (incumbent)	121,304	66.7
Republican	James E. Williams Jr.	60,523	33.3
Total votes		181,827	100.0
Turnout			
Democratic hold			

=== 1966 ===
1966 United States House of Representatives elections in California
Party	Candidate	Votes	%
Republican	Bob Mathias	96,699	55.9
Democratic	Harlan Hagen (incumbent)	76,346	44.1
Total votes		173,045	100.0
Turnout			
Republican gain from Democratic			

=== 1968 ===
1968 United States House of Representatives elections in California
Party	Candidate	Votes	%
Republican	Bob Mathias (incumbent)	100,008	65.2
Democratic	Harlan Hagen	51,274	33.4
American Independent	Edward Calvin Williams	2,186	1.4
Total votes		153,468	100.0
Turnout			
Republican hold			

=== 1970 ===
1970 United States House of Representatives elections in California
Party	Candidate	Votes	%
Republican	Bob Mathias (incumbent)	86,071	63.2
Democratic	Milton Spartacus Miller	48,415	33.4
American Independent	Nora E. Hensley	1,709	3.4
Total votes		136,195	100.0
Turnout			
Republican hold			

=== 1972 ===
1972 United States House of Representatives elections in California
Party	Candidate	Votes	%
Republican	Bob Mathias (incumbent)	109,993	66.5
Democratic	Vincent J. Lavery	55,484	33.5
Total votes		165,477	100.0
Turnout			
Republican hold			

=== 1974 ===
1974 United States House of Representatives elections in California
Party	Candidate	Votes	%
Republican	William M. Ketchum (inc.)	66,603	52.7
Democratic	George A. Seielstad	59,931	47.3
Total votes		126,534	100.0
Turnout			
Republican hold			

=== 1976 ===
1976 United States House of Representatives elections in California
Party	Candidate	Votes	%
Republican	William M. Ketchum (inc.)	101,658	64.2
Democratic	Dean Close	56,683	35.8
Total votes		158,341	100.0
Turnout			
Republican hold			

=== 1978 ===
1978 United States House of Representatives elections in California
Party	Candidate	Votes	%
Republican	Bill Thomas	85,663	59.3
Democratic	Bob Sogge	58,900	40.7
Total votes		144,563	100.0
Turnout			
Republican hold			

=== 1980 ===
1980 United States House of Representatives elections in California
Party	Candidate	Votes	%
Republican	Bill Thomas (incumbent)	126,046	71
Democratic	Mary Pat Timmermans	51,415	29
Total votes		177,461	100
Turnout			
Republican hold			

=== 1982 ===
1982 United States House of Representatives elections in California
Party	Candidate	Votes	%
Democratic	Richard H. Lehman	92,762	59.5
Republican	Adrian C. Fondse	59,664	38.3
Libertarian	Marshall William Fritz	3,501	2.2
Total votes		155,927	100.0
Turnout			
Democratic win (new seat)			

=== 1984 ===
1984 United States House of Representatives elections in California
Party	Candidate	Votes	%
Democratic	Richard H. Lehman (inc.)	128,186	67.3
Republican	Dale L. Ewen	62,339	32.7
Total votes		190,525	100.0
Turnout			
Democratic hold			

=== 1986 ===
1986 United States House of Representatives elections in California
Party	Candidate	Votes	%
Democratic	Richard H. Lehman (inc.)	101,480	71.3
Republican	David C. Crevelt	40,907	28.7
Total votes		142,387	100.0
Turnout			
Democratic hold			

=== 1988 ===
1988 United States House of Representatives elections in California
Party	Candidate	Votes	%
Democratic	Richard H. Lehman (inc.)	125,715	69.9
Republican	David A. Linn	54,034	30.1
Total votes		179,749	100.0
Turnout			
Democratic hold			

=== 1990 ===
1990 United States House of Representatives elections in California
Party	Candidate	Votes	%
Democratic	Richard H. Lehman (inc.)	98,804	100.0
Turnout			
Democratic hold			

=== 1992 ===
1992 United States House of Representatives elections in California
Party	Candidate	Votes	%
Democratic	Gary Condit (incumbent)	139,704	84.7
Libertarian	Kim R. Almstrom	25,307	15.3
Total votes		165,011	100.0
Turnout			
Democratic hold			

=== 1994 ===
1994 United States House of Representatives elections in California
Party	Candidate	Votes	%
Democratic	Gary Condit (incumbent)	91,106	65.52
Republican	Tom Carter	44,046	31.68
Libertarian	James B. Morzella	3,902	2.81
Total votes		139,054	100.0
Turnout			
Democratic hold			

=== 1996 ===
1996 United States House of Representatives elections in California
Party	Candidate	Votes	%
Democratic	Gary Condit (incumbent)	108,827	65.8%
Republican	Bill Conrad	52,695	31.8%
Libertarian	James Morzella	2,233	1.3%
Natural Law	Page Riskin	1,831	1.1%
Total votes		165,586	100.0%
Turnout			
Democratic hold			

=== 1998 ===
1998 United States House of Representatives elections in California
Party	Candidate	Votes	%
Democratic	Gary Condit (incumbent)	118,842	86.79%
Libertarian	Linda M. Degroat	18,089	13.21%
Total votes		136,931	100.0%
Turnout			
Democratic hold			

=== 2000 ===
2000 United States House of Representatives elections in California
Party	Candidate	Votes	%
Democratic	Gary Condit (incumbent)	118,842	67.2%
Republican	Steve R. Wilson	56,465	31.3%
Natural Law	Page Roth Riskin	2,860	1.5%
Total votes		178,167	100.0%
Turnout			
Democratic hold			

=== 2002 ===
2002 United States House of Representatives elections in California
Party	Candidate	Votes	%
Democratic	Dennis Cardoza	56,181	51.3
Republican	Dick Monteith	47,528	43.4
American Independent	Kevin H. Cripe	3,641	3.3
Libertarian	Linda De Groat	2,194	2.0
No party	Donna Crowder (write-in)	49	0.0
Turnout		109,593	
Democratic hold			

=== 2004 ===
2004 United States House of Representatives elections in California
Party	Candidate	Votes	%
Democratic	Dennis Cardoza (incumbent)	103,732	67.5
Republican	Charles F. Pringle Sr.	49,973	32.5
Total votes		153,705	100.0
Turnout			
Democratic hold			

=== 2006 ===
2006 United States House of Representatives elections in California
Party	Candidate	Votes	%
Democratic	Dennis Cardoza (incumbent)	71,182	65.5
Republican	John A. Kanno	37,531	34.5
Total votes		108,713	100.0
Turnout			
Democratic hold			

=== 2008 ===
2008 United States House of Representatives elections in California
Party	Candidate	Votes	%
Democratic	Dennis Cardoza (incumbent)	130,192	100.0
Total votes		130,192	100.0
Turnout			
Democratic hold			

=== 2010 ===
2010 United States House of Representatives elections in California
Party	Candidate	Votes	%
Democratic	Dennis Cardoza (incumbent)	72,853	58.48
Republican	Michael Clare Berryhill Sr.	51,716	41.52
Total votes		124,569	100.00
Turnout			
Democratic hold			

=== 2012 ===
2012 United States House of Representatives elections in California
Party	Candidate	Votes	%
Democratic	Anna Eshoo	212,831	70.5
Republican	Dave Chapman	89,103	29.5
Total votes		301,934	100.0
Democratic hold			

=== 2014 ===
2014 United States House of Representatives elections in California
Party	Candidate	Votes	%
Democratic	Anna Eshoo (incumbent)	133,060	68%
Republican	Richard B. Fox	63,326	32%
Total votes		196,386	100%
Democratic hold			

=== 2016 ===
2016 United States House of Representatives elections in California
Party	Candidate	Votes	%
Democratic	Anna Eshoo (incumbent)	230,460	71%
Republican	Richard B. Fox	93,470	29%
Total votes		323,930	100%
Democratic hold			

=== 2018 ===
2018 United States House of Representatives elections in California
Party	Candidate	Votes	%
Democratic	Anna Eshoo (incumbent)	225,142	74.5%
Republican	Christine Russell	77,096	25.5%
Total votes		302,238	100%
Democratic hold			

=== 2020 ===
2020 United States House of Representatives elections in California
Party	Candidate	Votes	%
Democratic	Anna Eshoo (incumbent)	217,377	63.2
Democratic	Rishi Kumar	126,750	36.8
Total votes		344,127	100.0
Democratic hold			

=== 2022 ===
2022 United States House of Representatives elections in California
Party	Candidate	Votes	%
Democratic	Zoe Lofgren (incumbent)	99,776	65.9
Republican	Peter Hernandez	51,737	34.1
Total votes		151,513	100.0
Democratic hold			

=== 2024 ===
2024 United States House of Representatives elections in California
Party	Candidate	Votes	%
Democratic	Zoe Lofgren (incumbent)	147,674	64.6
Republican	Peter Hernandez	80,832	35.4
Total votes		228,506	100.0
Democratic hold			

== See also ==
- List of United States congressional districts
- California's congressional districts
