= Burton W. Chace =

American politician

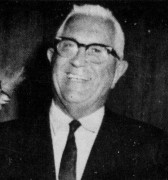
- Chace, circa 1967

Chair of Los Angeles County
- In office March 27, 1956 – December 4, 1956
- Preceded by: Herbert C. Legg
- Succeeded by: John Anson Ford
- In office December 4, 1964 – December 6, 1966
- Preceded by: Warren M. Dorn
- Succeeded by: Frank G. Bonelli

Member of the Los Angeles County Board of Supervisors 4th district
- In office 1953–1972
- Preceded by: Raymond V. Darby
- Succeeded by: James A. Hayes

17th Mayor of Long Beach, California
- In office 1947–1953
- Preceded by: Herbert E. Lewis
- Succeeded by: Lyman B. Sutter

Burton W. Chace (July 6, 1901 – August 22, 1972) was an American official, who served for nearly twenty years on the Los Angeles County Board of Supervisors.

== Biography ==
Burton W. Chace was born in Nebraska. On March 20, 1953, Governor Earl Warren appointed him to the Los Angeles County Board of Supervisors following the death of Supervisor Raymond V. Darby. Chace was elected to the remainder of the term in 1954 and elected to four full terms. He served until his death in an automobile accident on August 22, 1972, just before his fourth full term would have expired.

Prior to his appointment as a Los Angeles County supervisor, he served as Mayor of Long Beach, California from 1947 until 1953.

Burton W. Chace Park in Marina del Rey is named after him.

Preceded by Herbert E. Lewis	17th Mayor of Long Beach, California; 1947 — 1953	Succeeded by Lyman B. Sutter
Preceded by Herbert C. Legg; Warren M. Dorn	Chair of Los Angeles County; 1956; 1964 — 1966	Succeeded by John Anson Ford; Frank G. Bonelli
Preceded by Raymond V. Darby	Los Angeles County Board of Supervisors; 4th district 1953 — 1972	Succeeded by James A. Hayes
