= Elinor Ferry =

American journalist

- Born: 1915; Chambersburg, Pennsylvania
- Died: 1993 (aged 77–78)
- Years active: 1929–1980
- Political party: Independent-Socialist Party
- Board member of: Newspaper Guild), Transport Workers Union, Steel Workers Organizing Committee, Emergency Civil Liberties Union
- Spouse: George Kirstein
- Children: 1

Elinor Ferry (1915–1993) was an American journalist, labor organizer, and socialist. She was member of the Independent-Socialist Party and lifelong supporter of Alger Hiss. She was married for about a decade to The Nation publisher George Kirstein.

== Background ==
Ferry was born in 1913 in Chambersburg, Pennsylvania.

== Career ==
At age 16 (c. 1929), she became a female sports reporter (as "Betty Moore") for the Pittsburgh Sun-Telegraph, a Hearst newspaper.

She helped organize the American Newspaper Guild (now simply the Newspaper Guild), founded in 1933 by sportswriter Heywood Broun (who in 1930 had run unsuccessfully for Congress as a Socialist) and journalists Joseph Cookman and Allen Raymond. Whittaker Chambers mentions the founding of the Newspaper Guild in his 1952 memoir:

A Time writer stopped me in the hall and asked me to join the Newspaper Guild. At that time, and for a long time afterwards, the Time unit of the New York Newspaper Guild was tightly controlled by a small knot of Communists. I said that I did not believe that he would want me in the Guild... "I have broken with the Communist Party." ...No doubt, he checked at once. A few days later, the smear campaign against me was in full swing.

She became an assistant to Mike Quill of the Transport Workers Union, founded in 1934 by Quill for subway workers in New York City and which had leadership dominated by the CPUSA during its early years up through 1948 during the presidential campaign of Henry A. Wallace.

She worked for the Steel Workers Organizing Committee, founded in 1936 by the Congress of Industrial Organizations (CIO), disbanded in 1942 to become the United Steel Workers of America, now the United Steelworkers (USW) union.

She also served as secretary of Emergency Civil Liberties Union, founded in 1951 under the direction of Clark Foreman, formed as a breakaway from the American Civil Liberties Union (ACLU), known after 1968 as the National Emergency Civil Liberties Committee (NECLC), and merged in 1998 with the Center for Constitutional Rights (CCR). She was still secretary (as "Elinor Ferry Kirstein") in 1958.

In the 1950s, her name appears in print in various political capacities. In 1957, her name appears in a "Trotskyite" debate in the International Socialist Review.

In 2001, her name receives mention as an Independent-Socialist Party "campaigner."

== Hiss case ==
During the 1950s, Ferry documented McCarthyism and First Amendment defendants. Defendants whom she contacted include Anne Braden.

She spent many years writing about the Alger Hiss. Her correspondence appears in the Hiss papers at Harvard. According to Allen Weinstein, Ferry was a "friend and defense researcher" of Hiss who "worked closely with Helen Buttenweiser on research for Hiss's retrial motion." He also noted that "Links between The Nation and the Hiss defense had been close from the beginning of the case," starting with publisher Frida Kirchwey and followed by succeeding publisher George Kirstein (Ferry's husband). According to G. Edgar White, she was "Helen Buttenweiser's research assistant."

Her work was to result in a negative "political history" of Whittaker Chambers and a defense for Hiss. In The Nation, she once called her unpublished book Whittaker Chambers: Agent Provocateur. As early as 1952, other writers began to draw on her research to discredit Chambers. Author John Chabot Smith cited Ferry's interview with Max Bedacht (whom Chambers claimed had delivered his summons to the Soviet underground) and wrote that "Bedacht denied the whole story; he told journalist Elinor Ferry it was a flat lie, and that he had never had any connections with an underground of any sort, Russian or American". In his "psychobiography" on Chambers, author Meyer Zeligs cites copious usage of materials from Ferry. Author Julia M. Allen cited Ferry about Chambers' wife, "Recollections of Esther Shemitz reflect the gender rigidity of the time and help to explain why both Hutchins and Rocher felt especially protective of her. In interviews conducted by Elinor Ferry in the 1950s, Shemitz was characterized as being 'masculine'."

== FBI ==
The Federal Bureau of Investigation investigated Ferry from 1952 through 1968.

== Personal ==
Ferry married at least twice, the second time to George Kirstein for ten years. (Kirstein bought The Nation magazine in 1955 and ran it until 1965).

She had at least one child, James.

She resided mostly in Mamaroneck, New York, and died in 1993.

Friends since the mid-1950s included Nora Ruth Roberts ("a good friend of mine and valued comrade since 1957" she wrote in 2013) and Matthew Mills Stevenson.

== See also ==
- Mike Quill
- George Kirstein
- Joseph McCarthy
- George A. Eddy
- Alger Hiss
- Whittaker Chambers

== External sources ==
- "Elinor Ferry Papers TAM.116". Tamiment Library. Archived from the original on 4 March 2016.
- "Ferry, Elinor. Papers, 1944-1988". Harvard Law School Library. Archived from the original on 3 July 2018.
