= Byron N. Scott =

American lawyer and politician (1903–1991)

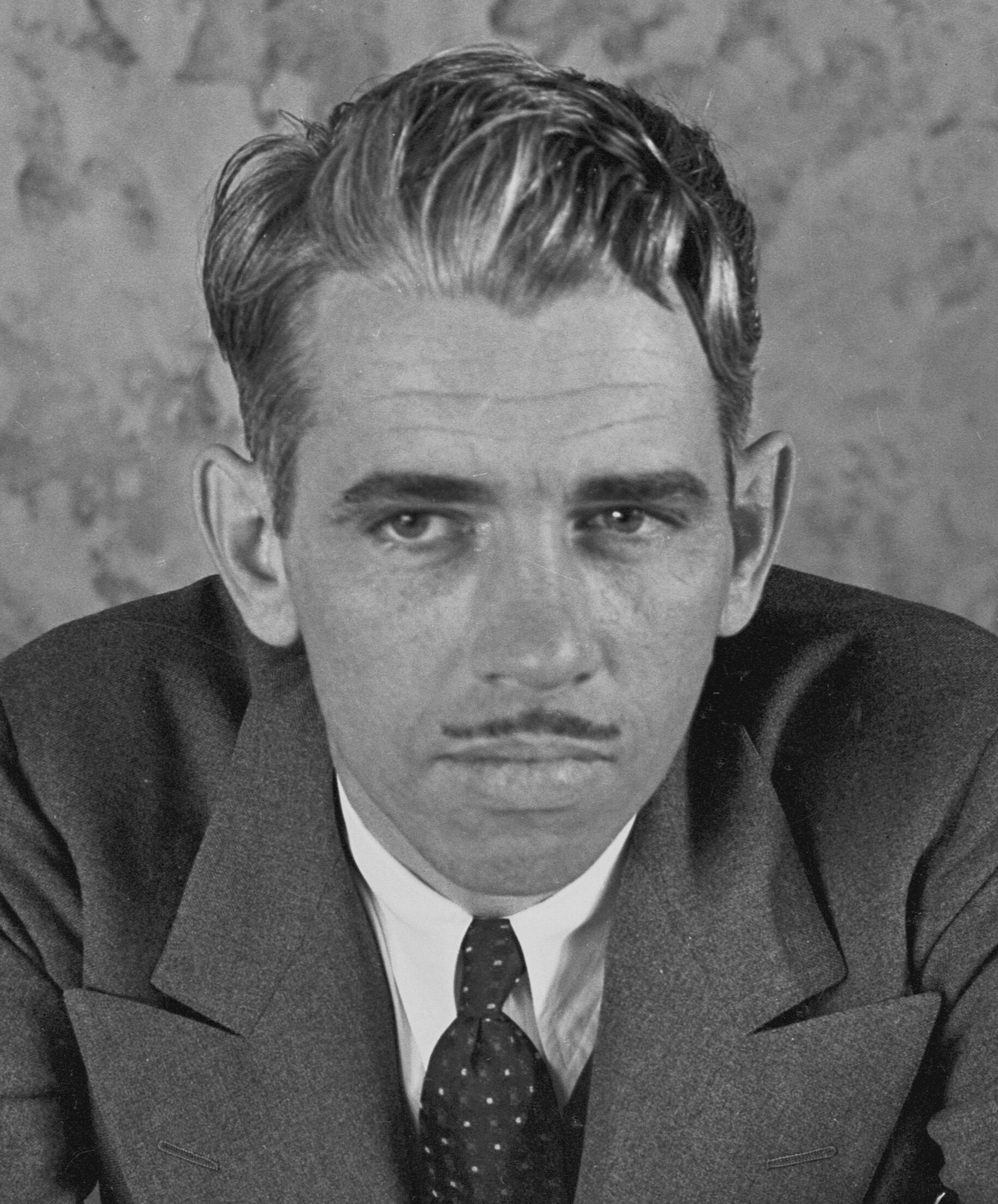
- Scott in 1935

Member of the U.S. House of Representatives from California's 18th district
- In office January 3, 1935 – January 3, 1939
- Preceded by: John H. Burke
- Succeeded by: Thomas M. Eaton

Secretary of the California Highway Commission
- In office March 7, 1939 – June 28, 1940
- Appointed by: Culbert Olson
- Preceded by: Julien D. Roussel
- Succeeded by: Walter Chambers

Personal details
- Born: Byron Nicholson Scott; March 21, 1903 Council Grove, Kansas, U.S.
- Died: December 21, 1991 (aged 88) Sun City, California, U.S.
- Party: Democratic
- Spouse: Eunice May Freed (m. 1937)
- Education: University of Kansas (A.B.); University of Southern California (M.A.); National University School of Law (B.L.)
- Occupation: Educator, lawyer

Byron Nicholson Scott (March 21, 1903 – December 21, 1991) was an American educator, lawyer and politician who served as the second United States Representative for California's 18th congressional district for two terms, from 1935 to 1939.

== Background ==
Scott was born on March 21, 1903, in Council Grove in Morris County, Kansas. He was raised in Council Grove and went through the town's public school system. He went to the University of Kansas at Lawrence, and graduated from the school in 1924. After graduating, Scott became a teacher in Tucson, Arizona, and taught there until 1926. Afterwards, he moved to go teach at public schools in Long Beach, California. During the while, he went to the University of Southern California where he obtained his master's degree in 1930. He taught in Long Beach until 1934, when he got involved in politics.

== Politics ==
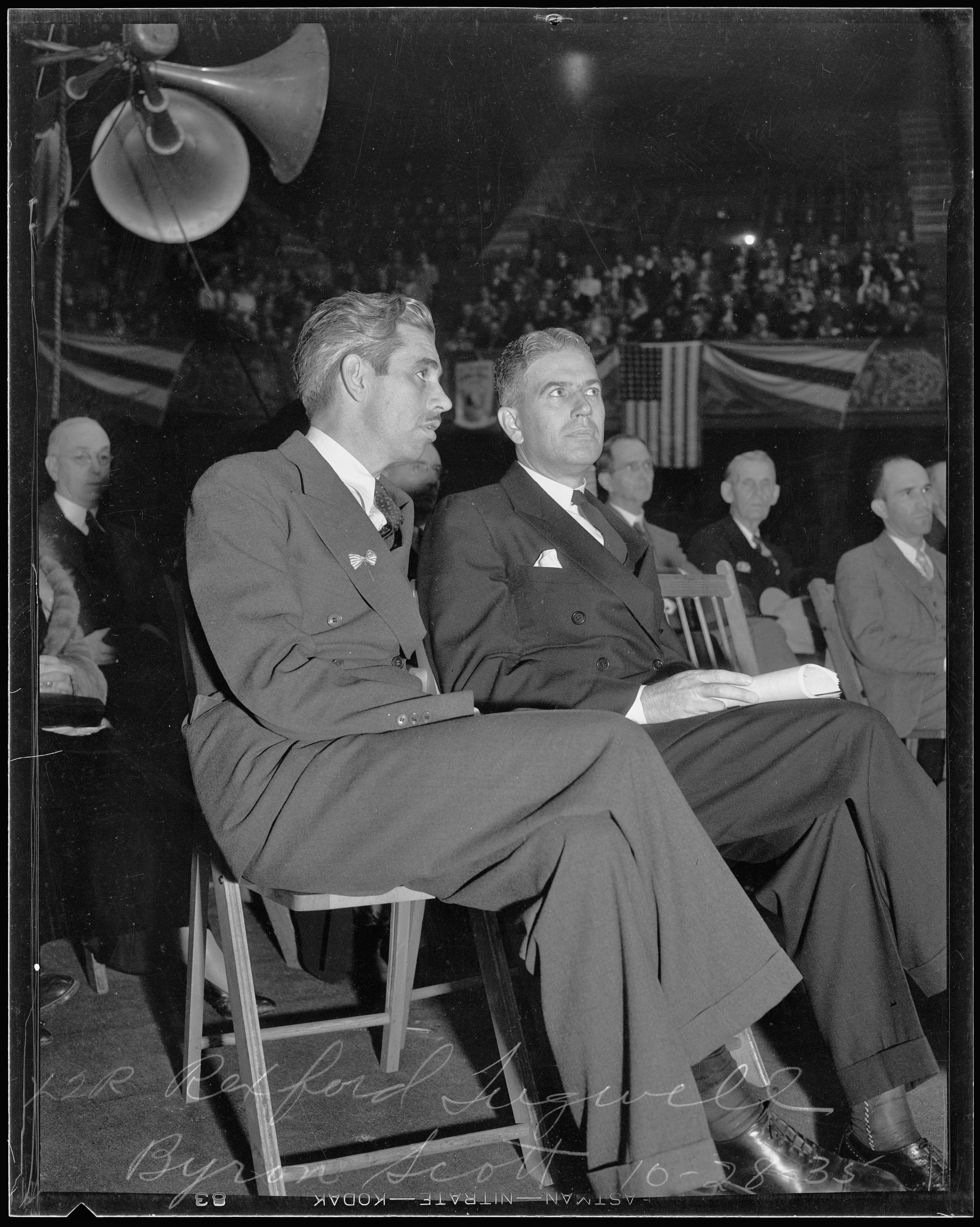
Scott (left) with Under Secretary of Agriculture Rexford Tugwell at the Olympic Auditorium in Los Angeles, October 28, 1935

Scott first served as a delegate to the California Democratic state convention in 1934. Scott also ran for the United States House of Representatives seat for California's recently formed 18th congressional district. After getting the Democratic nomination, he ran against Republican William Brayton. Scott defeated Brayton by capturing 56.3% of the vote, in comparison to his 43.2%. From June 23, 1936, to June 27, 1936, he served as a delegate in the Democratic National Convention held at Convention Hall in Philadelphia, Pennsylvania, in which they renominated Franklin D. Roosevelt to be the presidential candidate, and John Nance Garner as his vice-presidential running mate. Later that year, Scott ran for re-election as the representative for the 18th district, and easily defeated Republican challenger James F. Collins by more than 18,000 votes in a 58.9%-41.0% majority.

During his tenure, Scott was labeled California's "EPIC Congressman" by some newspapers due to his support for Upton Sinclair and his End Poverty in California program in the 1934 California gubernatorial election. He was the keynote speaker at the first meeting of the Wilmington EPIC Club on June 8, 1934, and campaigned for Congress on EPIC's economic platform.

In the 1938 House elections, Scott was challenged by Thomas M. Eaton. In a close race, Eaton squeezed past Scott by a mere 342 vote, or 0.3% margin. For the next two years, he served as the secretary of the California Highway Commission. Scott again ran for the seat in 1940 but lost to Republican challenger Ward Johnson by a nearly 10% majority. After spending 1941 and 1942 in the construction business, Scott served on Roosevelt's World War II War Production Board in Washington, D.C., until the end of the war in 1945.

== Law practice ==
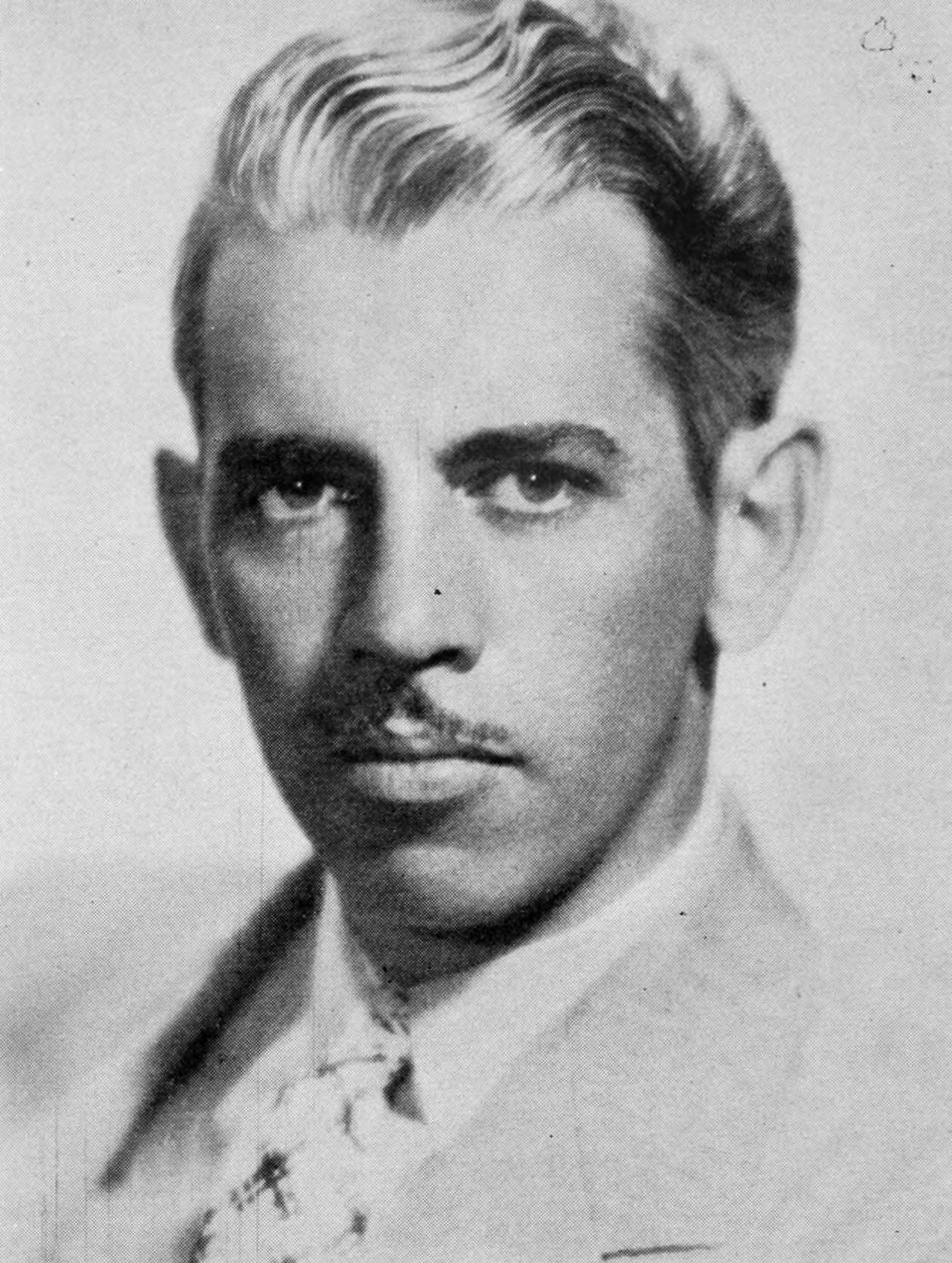
Scott c. 1940

Scott spent the next few years pursuing his Bachelor of Laws degree from the National University School of Law. After graduating in 1949, he was admitted to the bar in Washington, D.C., where he started up his practice.

From 1953 to 1955, he represented U.S. Treasury official William Henry Taylor before the International Organization Employees Loyalty Board (IOELB).

In 1954, he represented U.S. Treasury official George A. Eddy during congressional loyalty/security hearings related to ongoing investigations into Eddy's Treasury superior Harry Dexter White.

In 1959, he represented Frank Kameny in his lawsuit against the Secretary of the Army. Kameny, who had been fired "for homosexuality", filed the case challenging the US Government's ban on homosexual employees. After summary judgment was granted at the Justice Department's request, Scott represented Kameny in his appeal. Kameny worked alone after losing appeal, basing his Petition for Writ of Certiorari on a sample provided by Scott. His was the first gay rights case to be presented to the United States Supreme Court. Although the Court denied him certiorari, On June 29, 2009, John Berry (Director of the Office of Personnel Management) formally apologized to Kameny on behalf of the United States government. Kameny's filings and other papers are housed in the Library of Congress.

=== Retirement and death ===
Scott retired from his law practice in 1979 and lived as a resident of Sun City, California, until his death on December 21, 1991, at the age of 88.

== Electoral history ==
United States House of Representatives elections, 1934
Party	Candidate	Votes	%
Democratic	Byron N. Scott	52,377	56.3
Republican	William Brayton	40,179	43.2
Communist	Clyde Champion	507	0.5
Total votes		93,063	100.0
Turnout			
Democratic hold			

United States House of Representatives elections, 1936
Party	Candidate	Votes	%
Democratic	Byron N. Scott (incumbent)	61,415	59
Republican	James F. Collins	42,748	41
Total votes		134,163	100
Turnout			
Democratic hold			

United States House of Representatives elections, 1938
Party	Candidate	Votes	%
Republican	Thomas M. Eaton	52,216	48.6
Democratic	Byron N. Scott (incumbent)	51,874	48.3
Progressive Party (United States, 1924)	Solomon Carr	3,384	3.1
Total votes		107,474	100.0
Turnout			
Republican gain from Democratic			

United States House of Representatives elections, 1940
Party	Candidate	Votes	%
Republican	William Ward Johnson (inc.)	73,932	54.4
Democratic	Byron N. Scott	60,764	44.7
Communist	George R. Ashby	1,355	0.9
Total votes		136,051	100.0
Turnout			
Republican hold			

== See also ==
- Frank Kameny
- George A. Eddy

U.S. House of Representatives
Preceded by John H. Burke	Member of the U.S. House of Representatives from California's 18th congressional district 1935 - 1939	Succeeded by Thomas M. Eaton
