= John Anson Ford =

American politician

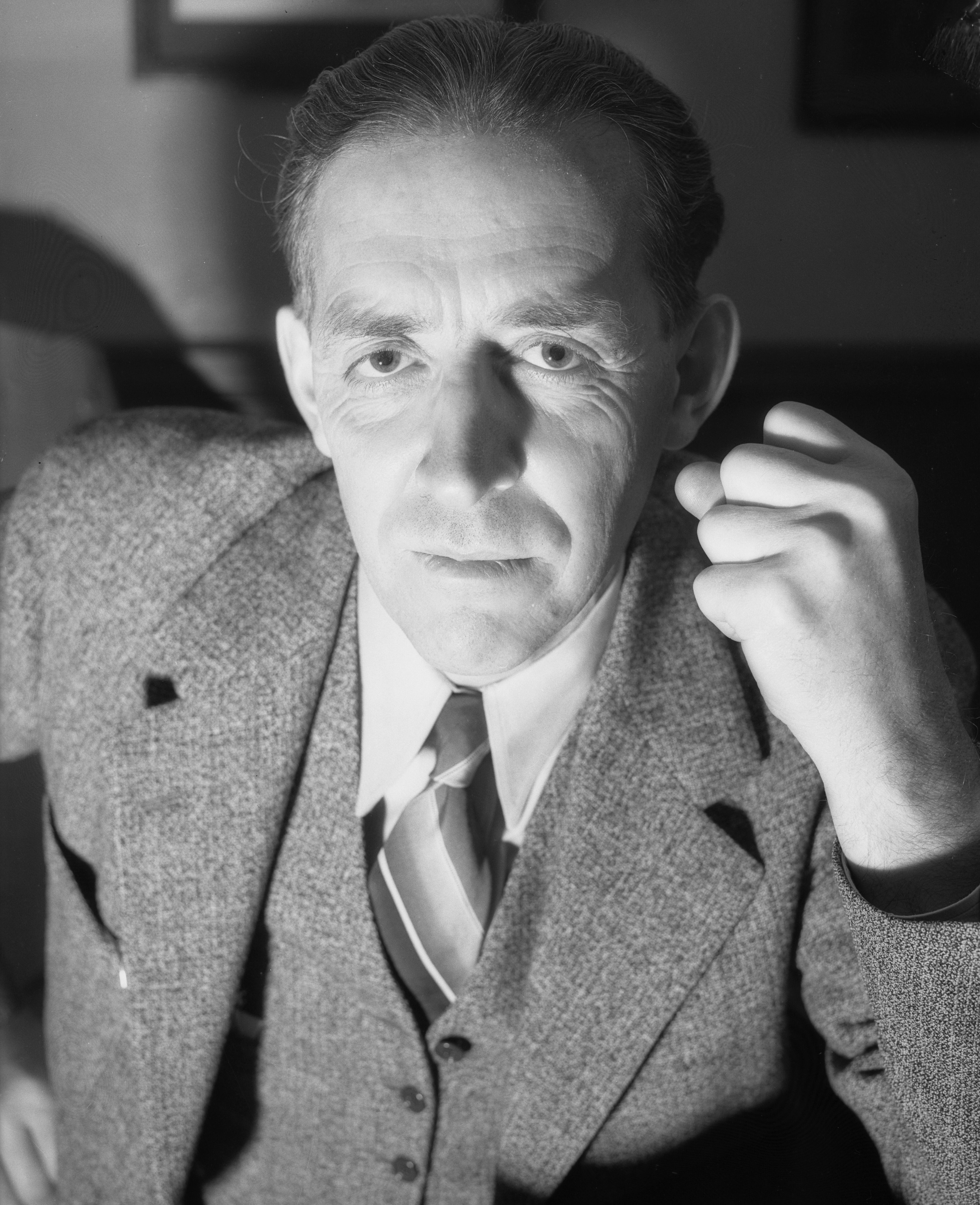
- Ford in 1935

Chairman of the California Fair Employment Practice Commission
- In office September 2, 1959 – January 11, 1964
- Appointed by: Pat Brown
- Preceded by: Position established
- Succeeded by: Carmen Warschaw

Chair of Los Angeles County
- In office December 4, 1956 – December 1, 1958
- Preceded by: Burton W. Chace
- Succeeded by: Frank G. Bonelli
- In office December 5, 1950 – December 7, 1954
- Preceded by: Leonard J. Roach
- Succeeded by: Herbert C. Legg
- In office December 8, 1942 – December 7, 1943
- Preceded by: Gordon L. McDonough
- Succeeded by: Oscar L. Hauge

Member of the Los Angeles County Board of Supervisors for the 3rd district
- In office 1934–1958
- Preceded by: Harry M. Baine
- Succeeded by: Ernest E. Debs

Personal details
- Born: September 29, 1883 Waukegan, Illinois, U.S.
- Died: November 3, 1983 (aged 100) Los Angeles, California, U.S.
- Party: Democratic
- Spouse: Lois Goldsmith
- Children: Jack
- Education: Beloit College (B.A.)

John Anson Ford (September 29, 1883 – November 3, 1983) was an American journalist, advertising executive and Democratic Party politician. He was a long-serving member of the Los Angeles County Board of Supervisors.

== Career and politics ==
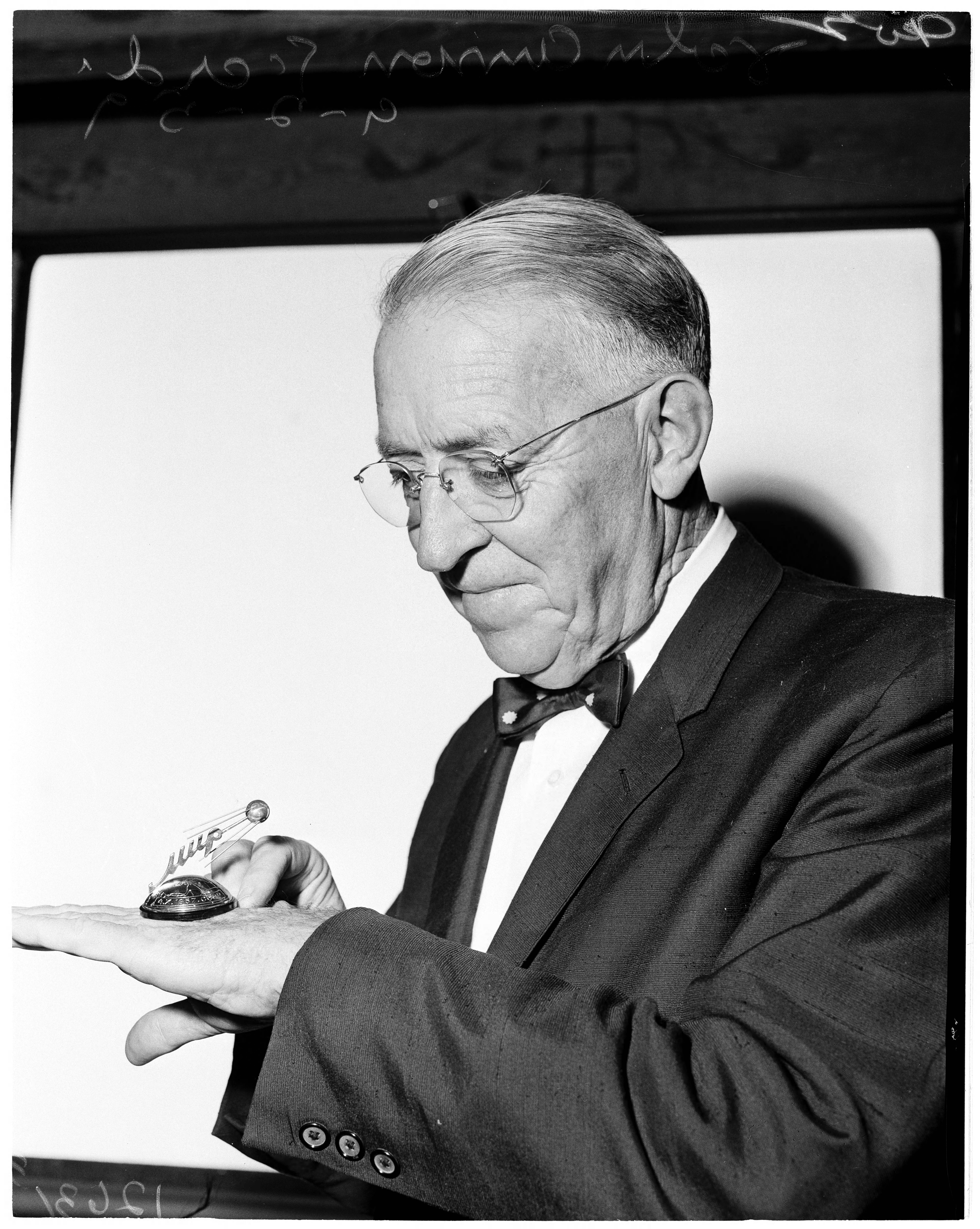
Ford displays a miniature gold Sputnik given to him by the Russian Premier on his recent trip to that country, 1959

Ford was born in Waukegan, Illinois. He attended Beloit College in Beloit, Wisconsin, taught history and economics, then moved to Chicago, where he worked on the Chicago Tribune. He was on the editorial board of Popular Mechanics. In 1920, he came to Los Angeles and entered the advertising and publicity business.

Ford was elected to the Los Angeles County Board of Supervisors in 1934; the office is nonpartisan but he identified as an "EPIC Democrat." Representing the 3rd district, he served on the Board until 1958. He was active in Democratic Party politics, serving on the state Central Committee, as chair of the Los Angeles County Democratic Party, as a delegate to Democratic National Conventions from California, candidate for the Democratic nomination for U.S. Senator from California in 1940, and as chairman of the Southern California Citizens for Kennedy Committee. On his motion, in 1944, the Board of Supervisors established the Joint Committee for Interracial Progress that later became the Human Relations Commission.

After retiring, Ford "wrote regular newspaper columns and continued to give service to the community at large." The John Anson Ford Human Relations Award is named for him, as are the John Anson Ford Amphitheatre in Los Angeles and John Anson Ford Park in Bell Gardens, California.

John Anson Ford died at Midway Hospital in Los Angeles at the age of 100. He is buried in Forest Lawn Memorial Park, Glendale, California.

== Bibliography ==
- "Thirty Explosive Years in Los Angeles County", University of California Press, 2010
