= Thomas M. Eaton =

American politician

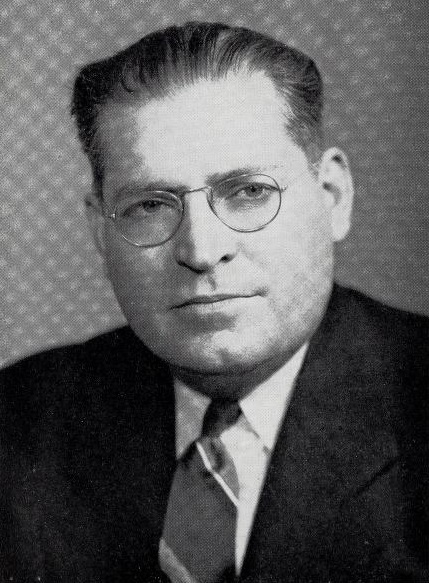

Member of the U.S. House of Representatives from California's 18th district
- In office January 3, 1939 – September 16, 1939
- Preceded by: Byron N. Scott
- Succeeded by: William Ward Johnson

Personal details
- Born: Thomas Marion Eaton; August 3, 1896 near Edwardsville, Illinois, US
- Died: September 16, 1939 (aged 43) Long Beach, California, US
- Party: Republican
- Profession: Automobile sales

Thomas Marion Eaton (August 3, 1896 – September 16, 1939) was an American businessman and World War I veteran who served nine months as a U.S. representative from California in 1939.

== Biography ==
Born on a farm near Edwardsville, Illinois, Eaton attended the public schools. He graduated from the State Normal School (now Illinois State University) in Normal in 1917. He served as principal of a grade school in Clinton, Illinois, in 1917 and 1918.

=== World War I ===
During the First World War served in the United States Navy as an ensign.

=== Auto business ===
He moved to Long Beach, California, in 1921 and engaged in the automobile sales business.

=== Local politics ===
Eaton was elected to the Long Beach City Council in 1934. He was reelected in 1936, and was unanimously chosen mayor by the council.

=== Congress ===
Eaton was elected as a Republican to the Seventy-sixth Congress and served from January 3, 1939, until his death in Long Beach, California, September 16, 1939.

Eaton's seat remained vacant until his elected successor, William Ward Johnson, took office in January 1941.

== Electoral history ==
United States House of Representatives elections, 1938
Party	Candidate	Votes	%
Republican	Thomas M. Eaton	52,216	48.6
Democratic	Byron N. Scott (incumbent)	51,874	48.3
Progressive Party (United States, 1924)	Solomon Carr	3,384	3.1
Total votes		107,474	100.0
Turnout			
Republican gain from Democratic			

== See also ==
- List of members of the United States Congress who died in office (1900–1949)

U.S. House of Representatives
Preceded by Byron N. Scott	Member of the U.S. House of Representatives from California's 18th congressional district January 3, 1939 - September 16, 1939	Succeeded by Vacant until January 1941 next held by William Ward Johnson
Political offices
Preceded by Carl Fletcher	12th Mayor of Long Beach; 1936 – 1938	Succeeded by Clarence E. Wagner
