= Emile Despres =

- Born: September 21, 1909; Chicago, United States
- Died: April 23, 1973 (aged 63); Portola Valley, California, United States
- Education: Harvard University
- Occupations: economist, government official, professor
- Years active: 1930–1973
- Employer: U.S. Government
- Spouse: Joanna Hitt Eakin
- Children: Lani, John, and Charles
- Parent(s): Emile Despres, Irma Rosenthal
- Relatives: Leon Despres

Emile Despres (21 September 1909 – 23 April 1973) served as an advisor on German Economic Affairs at the U.S. Department of State, 1944–1945. He was also a professor of economics at Williams College and Stanford University.

== Background ==
Emile Despres was born on September 21, 1909, in Chicago, Illinois. His father was Emile Despres. His mother was Irma Rosenthal. His first cousin was Leon Despres. Upon his father's death, his mother married William J. Mack.

He attended schools in Chicago and the Riverdale Country School in New York. He graduated from Harvard University magna cum laude in 1930.

== Career ==
Upon graduation, Despres went to work for the Federal Reserve Bank of New York as a special foreign exchange analyst. He established a system for monitoring the volatile international flows of short-term capital during the Great Depression. He supported expansionary policy. He was among the advisors who early warned that Hjalmar Schacht's system of exchange controls would help Germany carry through economic recovery and military rearmament without suffering a balance of payments collapse.

In 1937, Despres returned to Harvard as a consultant in the Graduate School Public Administration.

In 1939, Despres served as Economic Advisor to the chairman of the board of the Federal Reserve System. In 1941, he became a member of the Board of Analysts and a director in the economic division, as well as alternate member of the Joint Intelligence Staff in the U.S. Joint Chiefs Staff and Office of Strategic Services.

In 1944, he became advisor on German Economic Affairs at the U.S. Department of State. In 1945, he became a member of the American delegation to the Potsdam Conference. In the summer of 1948, he worked on the Economic Cooperation Administration in Paris. In the summer of 1951, he served in the U.S. Embassy in Belgrade in economic aid to Yugoslavia. From 1955 to 1956, he served as a fiscal and monetary advisor to the Pakistan Planning Board.

From 1946 to 1961, Despres was a professor of economics at Williams College. From 1961 to 1973, he was a professor of economics at Stanford University. From 1967 to 1968, he was a visiting research professor at the Brookings Institution.

== McCarthyism ==
In July 1947, Despres vouched for the loyalty of Carl Marzani, convicted for concealing Communist Party membership in his application for Government employment. In August 1947, Despres again "testified emphatically" for Marzani's loyalty before the House Committee on Un-American Activities.

During the McCarthy era, Despres was among a number of Federal employees alleged to be sources of information to the communist underground, including Lauchlin Currie, Harry Dexter White, V. Frank Coe, Robert C. Barnard, George A. Eddy, William Ludwig Ullman, Harold Glasser, Solomon Adler, and William Henry Taylor. Allegations were never substantiated.

== Personal and death ==
Despres married Joanna Hitt Eakin in 1939 and had three children: Lani, John, and Charles.

The Despres Family built the home later purchased by Eric Sevareid in Alexandria, Virginia.

Despres died in Portola Valley, California, on April 23, 1973.

== Sources ==
- "Emile Despres Papers". Harry S. Truman Library and Museum.
- "Memorial Resolution: Emile Despres (1909-1973)" (PDF). Stanford Historical Society. Archived from the original (PDF) on 19 June 2015.
- Collection of works by Emile Despres
