= John H. Burke (politician) =

American politician

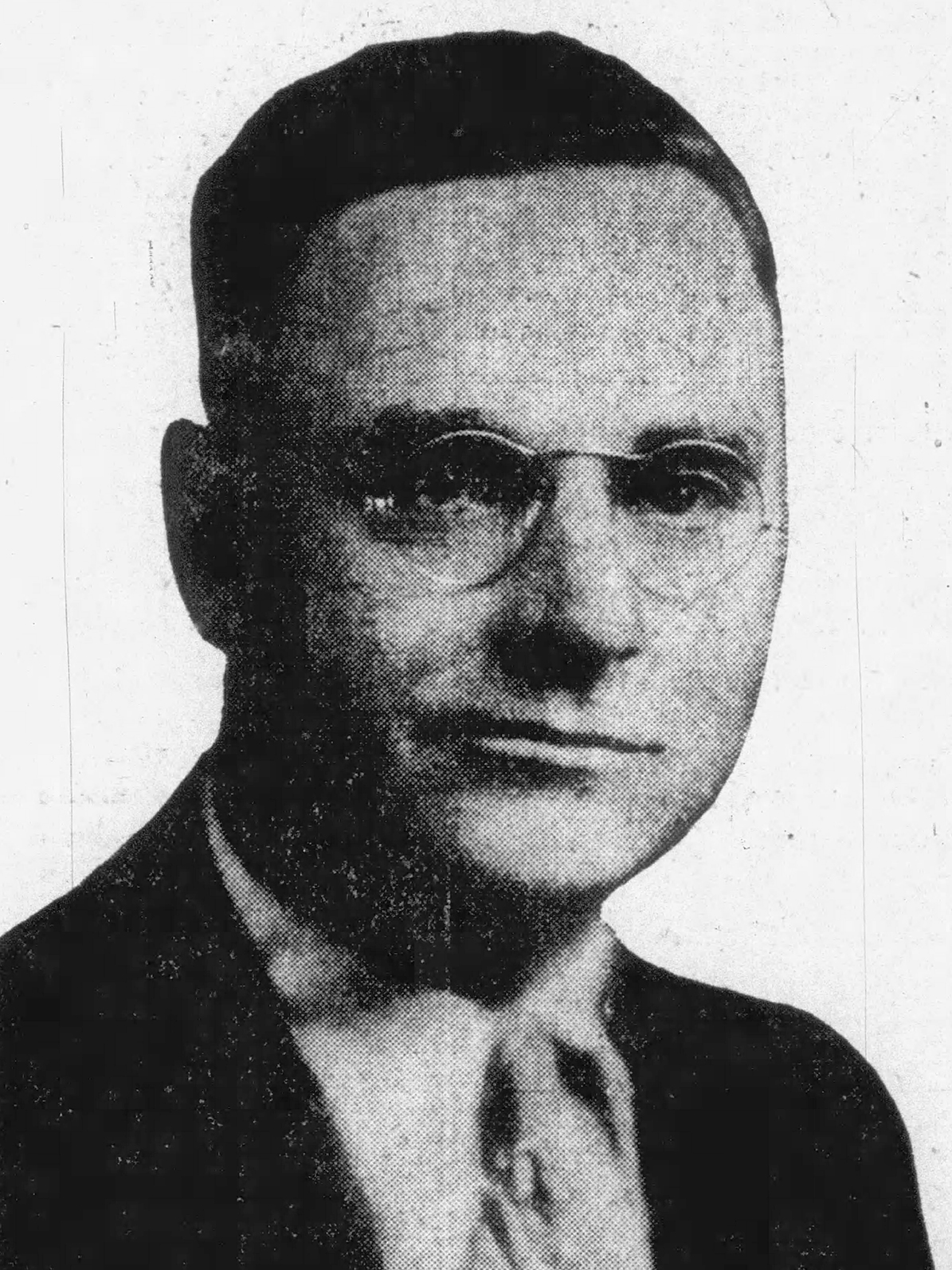

Member of the U.S. House of Representatives from California's 18th district
- In office March 4, 1933 – January 3, 1935
- Preceded by: District created
- Succeeded by: Byron N. Scott

Personal details
- Born: John Harley Burke; June 2, 1894 Excelsior, Wisconsin
- Died: May 14, 1951 (aged 56) Long Beach, California
- Resting place: Calvary Cemetery
- Party: Democratic

John Harley Burke (June 2, 1894 – May 14, 1951) was an American lawyer, real estate broker and politician. The Democrat was the first United States Representative from California's 18th congressional district, serving for one term from 1933 to 1935.

== Background ==
Burke was born on June 2, 1894, in Excelsior in Richland County, Wisconsin. At the age of three, he moved with his parents to Milaca, Minnesota. Three years later, they moved to San Pedro, California, before settling in Long Beach, California, in 1909.

=== Education ===
After attending public school in Long Beach, Burke went on to attend the University of Santa Clara and the law department of the University of Southern California at Los Angeles. After obtaining his Bachelor of Laws degree, he was admitted to the bar in 1917 and started up his law practice in Long Beach.

=== World War I ===
During World War I, Burke served as a private, first class in the 12th Training Training Battery of the Field Artillery in Camp Taylor, Kentucky. After the war, he got himself involved in the oil business.

== Congress ==
Burke first ran in 1932 for the United States House of Representatives seat for California's 18th congressional district, just recently formed. The Democrat Burke beat the Republican Robert Henderson and the Independent William E. Hinshaw, by capturing 53.2% of the vote in comparison to 37.4% and 9.3% for the other two candidates, respectively.

Burke was not a candidate for renomination in the 1934 House elections.

== Later career and death ==
After leaving Congress, Burke went back to Long Beach, California, to engage in real estate business.

He continued until his death there on May 14, 1951. He was then interred at Calvary Cemetery in East Los Angeles, California.

== Electoral history ==
1932 United States House of Representatives elections in California
Party	Candidate	Votes	%
Democratic	John H. Burke	48,179	53.3
Republican	Robert Henderson	33,817	37.4
Independent	William E. Hinshaw	8,399	9.3
Total votes		90,395	100.0
Turnout			
Democratic win (new seat)			

U.S. House of Representatives
New district	Member of the U.S. House of Representatives from California's 18th congressional district 1933 - 1935	Succeeded by Byron N. Scott
