= Thomas Clark (Long Beach) =

American politician (1926–2020)

Thomas J. Clark

22nd and 24th Mayor of Long Beach
- In office 1975–1980
- Preceded by: Edwin W. Wade
- Succeeded by: Eunice Sato
- In office 1982–1984
- Preceded by: Eunice Sato
- Succeeded by: Ernie Kell

Personal details
- Born: Thomas Joseph Clark Jr. July 13, 1926 San Diego, California
- Died: May 6, 2020 (aged 93) Long Beach, CA
- Spouse: Lois (died 2006)
- Profession: optometrist

Thomas Joseph Clark Jr. (July 13, 1926 – May 6, 2020) was an American politician. He served as mayor of Long Beach, California from 1975 to 1980 and from 1982 to 1984, as elected by the Long Beach City Council.

== Life and career ==
Clark was born in San Diego and moved to Long Beach in 1933. He was a graduate of Woodrow Wilson Classical High School and an alumnus of Long Beach City College and the University of California at Berkeley. He was an optometrist.

In addition to serving as mayor, Clark was a member of the city council and its longest serving member, serving from 1965 to 1996. He had also served on the Long Beach City College Board of Trustees (from 1998 to 2013), and as president of the Community College League of California (CCLC), the California Community College Trustee (CCCT) Board, and the League of California Cities. He retired from his optometry practice in 1993, and from public office in 2014. He died in May 2020 at the age of 93.
