= Excelsior, Richland County, Wisconsin =

Excelsior, Wisconsin
- Unincorporated community
- Location within Wisconsin Location within the United States
- Coordinates: 43°15′06″N 90°37′41″W
- Country: United States
- State: Wisconsin
- County: Richland
- Elevation: 686 ft (209 m)
- Time zone: UTC-6 (Central (CST))
  - Summer (DST): UTC-5 (CDT)
- Area code: 608
- GNIS feature ID: 1564780

Excelsior is an unincorporated community located in the town of Richwood, Richland County, Wisconsin, United States. Excelsior is located along County Highway F and Knapp Creek 5.5 miles (8.9 km) northwest of Blue River.

== Notable people ==
- John H. Burke – U.S. Representative from California
- Virgil H. Cady – Wisconsin State Assemblyman
- Floyd M. McDowell – leader in the Reorganized Church of Jesus Christ of Latter Day Saints
