= George A. Eddy =

American economist

George Alfred Eddy
- Born: June 15, 1907; New Jersey
- Died: April 13, 1998 (aged 90)
- Education: Yale University, Harvard University
- Occupations: economist, government official
- Employer(s): Federal Reserve Bank of New York, United States Treasury
- Spouse: Eileen

George A. Eddy (June 15, 1907 – April 13, 1998) was an American economist who served in the Federal Reserve and U.S. Treasury Department between 1934 and 1954. He was in Harry Dexter White's Division of Monetary Research. Between 1948 and 1954, he was Chief of Division for the Treasury's Gold and Silver Exchange Stabilization Fund.

== Background ==
George A. Eddy was born in New Jersey on June 15, 1907. From 1921 to 1924, he attended Phillips Academy in Andover, MA, and received his BA from Yale University in 1928. (He was elected to Phi Beta Kappa there). He studied at Harvard University from 1930 to 1933, when he received an MBA. At Harvard, his interest lay in macroeconomic policies, specifically the U.S. deficit and prosperity via stable prices.

== Career ==
=== Government service ===
In December 1933, Eddy became assistant to the Economist and Vice President at the Federal Reserve Bank of New York. He worked as a research analyst for the Division of Research and Statistics at the U.S. Treasury (1934–1936). He returned to the Federal Reserve Bank of New York in 1936, where he worked in its Research Department until 1939, first on Far Eastern affairs, later on domestic finance and business issues. After a brief time as a columnist and reporter for the Journal of Commerce in New York City, he returned to the Treasury (still in 1939) as a senior economic analyst in the Division of Monetary Research.

Eddy served as a lieutenant in the U.S. Navy during World War II and remained in the Navy as a reservist.

Upon his return from the war, Eddy resumed work for the U.S. Treasury under (to be) accused communist Harry Dexter White, who was then director of the Division of Monetary Research.

From 1948 to 1954, Eddy was Chief of Division for the Treasury's Gold and Silver Exchange Stabilization Fund. In 1948, Eddy traveled to Saudi Arabia, possibly to help establish the Saudi Arabian Monetary Agency.

=== Accusation and clearance ===
In 1954, Eddy was suspended from the U.S. Treasury as a security risk. At the time, many Treasury employees came under suspicion of communist sympathies. The suspension arose from his associations with and open support of alleged communists, including Lauchlin Currie, Harry Dexter White, V. Frank Coe, Robert C. Barnard, Emile Despres, William Ludwig Ullman, Harold Glasser, Solomon Adler, and William Henry Taylor.

Elizabeth Bentley, a former communist who became a government informer, was a main source of information on the communist activities of Treasury employees. During Eddy's hearing, his lawyer (Byron N. Scott) attacked Bentley's credibility and evidence against many of those he defended. Eddy mentioned to the Security Board that he also doubted the guilt of Alger Hiss (convicted in 1950 of perjury).

=== Retirement ===
In late 1955, following his hearing, Eddy received full clearance and back pay. Soon after receiving full clearance, Eddy resigned from the U.S. Treasury. He began a book about the accusations of Bentley and Whittaker Chambers against Hiss and White.

== Personal life ==
In 1941, Eddy married wife Eileen.

George A. Eddy died on April 13, 1998.

== Legacy ==
In September 1998, Bruce Craig gave the Harvard University Law School materials accumulated by Eddy: research papers of Elinor Ferry (from Ferry's son James), files related to the William Henry Taylor case (from Bryan Scott), and Eddy's papers (each processed and inventoried separately by Harvard). Eddy's papers formed a major source for Treasonable Doubt by R. Bruce Craig.

== Writings ==
Articles;

- "Security Issues and Real Investment in 1929," The Review of Economic Statistics (1937)
- "The Present Status of New Security Issues," The Review of Economic Statistics (1939)
- "A Modest Inquiry into the Nature and Necessity of Deficits," The Review of Economic Statistics (1939)
- "A Program to Improve the Monetary System of Saudi Arabia" with Raymond F. Mikesell (1948)

== See also ==
- Harry Dexter White
- Alger Hiss
- Elizabeth Bentley
- Whittaker Chambers

== External sources ==
- Harvard Law School Library Eddy, George A. Papers, 1925-1997
