= Raymond V. Darby =

American politician

Personal details
- Born: December 11, 1896
- Died: March 5, 1953 (aged 56)

Raymond V. Darby (December 11, 1896 – March 5, 1953) was an American politician who served on the Los Angeles County Board of Supervisors from 1944 until his death. He was the Mayor of Inglewood, California for fourteen years.

== Biography ==
Raymond Vern Darby was born in Washington, Kansas on December 11, 1896. In 1944, he was elected to the Los Angeles County Board of Supervisors and re-elected in 1946, 1948, 1950 and again in 1952. On March 5, 1953, he was struck in the Board of Supervisors hearing room by an irate property owner and died later that day from a brain hemorrhage.

Prior to serving on the Los Angeles County Board of Supervisors, he was mayor of Inglewood.

He can be heard as a contestant on the 20th June 1951 edition of You Bet Your Life.

Preceded by Hugh B. Lawrence	Mayor of Inglewood, California; 1930—1944	Succeeded by Ernest S. Dixon
Preceded by William A. Smith	Chair of Los Angeles County; 1946—1948	Succeeded by Leonard J. Roach
Preceded by Oscar Hauge	Los Angeles County Board of Supervisors; 4th district 1944—1953	Succeeded by Burton W. Chace
