= Eunice Sato =

American politician from California (1921–2021)

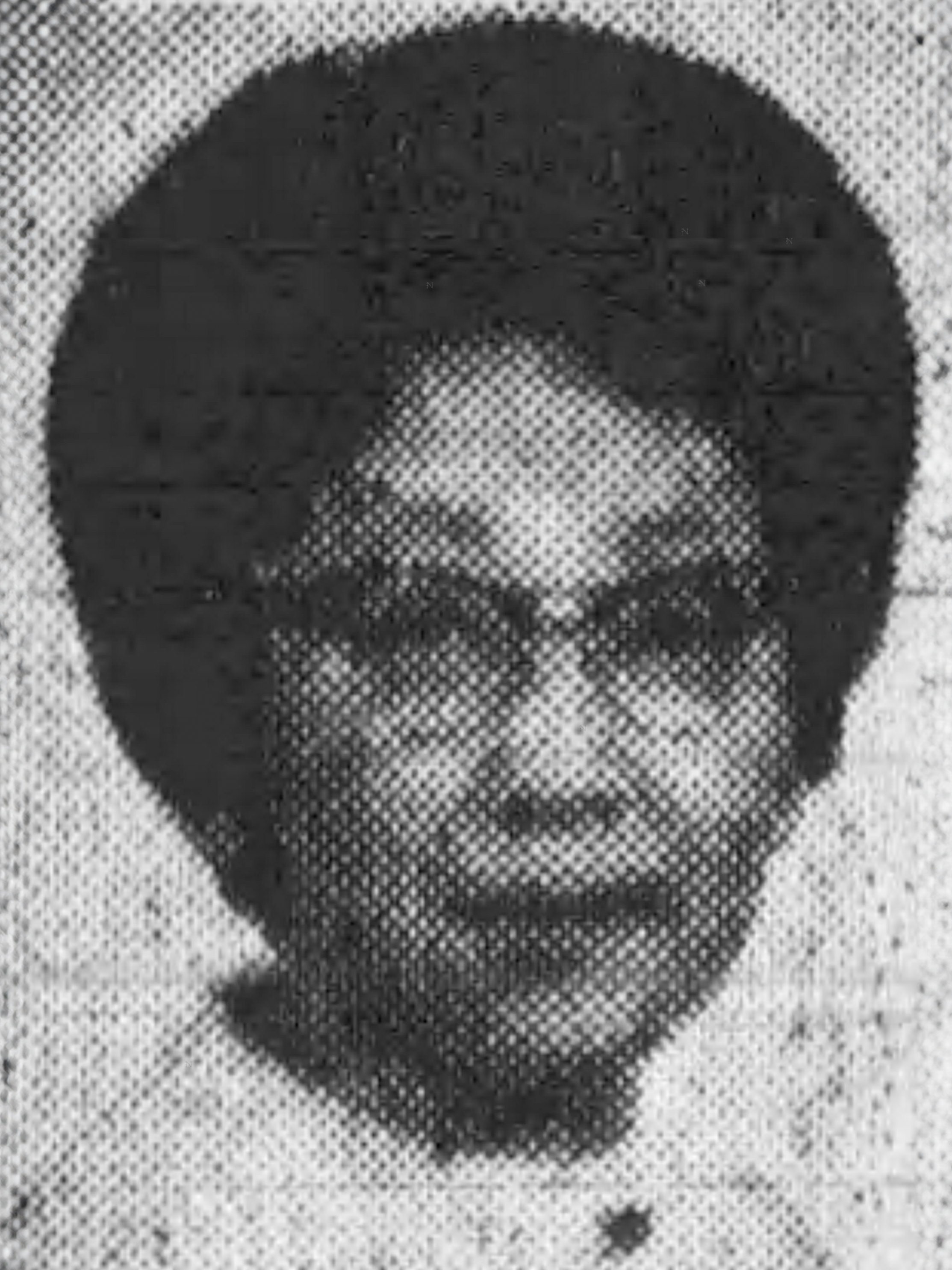
- Sato in 1975

23rd Mayor of Long Beach
- In office 1980–1982
- Preceded by: Thomas J. Clark
- Succeeded by: Thomas J. Clark

Personal details
- Born: June 8, 1921 Livingston, California, U.S.
- Died: February 12, 2021 (aged 99) Long Beach, California, U.S.
- Party: Republican
- Spouse: Thomas Sato (m.1950–2013; his death)
- Occupation: Teacher, politician
- Known for: First female mayor of Long Beach

Eunice Noda Sato (June 8, 1921 – February 12, 2021) was an American politician. She served as mayor of Long Beach, California from 1980 to 1982. As such she was the first Asian-American female mayor of a major American city, as well as the first female mayor of Long Beach.

== Life and career ==
Sato was the daughter of Japanese parents Bunsaku and Sawa Maeda Noda. She attended Modesto Junior College, the University of Northern Colorado, and Columbia University, and became a teacher. She taught in Michigan and overseas in Yokohama, Japan. In 1950, she married Thomas Takahashi Sato. She moved to Long Beach in 1956. She was elected to the Long Beach City Council in 1975 and served until 1986. In 1991 she was appointed to the U.S. National Advisory Council on Educational Research by George H. W. Bush. In September 2014, the former Hill Middle School, near the campus of California State University, Long Beach was named in her honor, as Sato Academy of Mathematics and Science. Sato died at her home in Long Beach on February 12, 2021, aged 99.

== See also ==
- Asian American and Pacific Islands American conservatism in the United States
