= Clarence E. Wagner =

American politician

13th and 15th Mayor of Long Beach
- In office 1942–1945
- Preceded by: Thomas M. Eaton
- Succeeded by: Francis H. Gentry
- In office 1938–1939
- Preceded by: Francis H. Gentry
- Succeeded by: Herbert E. Lewis

Personal details
- Born: 6 September 1896 Antigo, Wisconsin, U.S.
- Died: 26 July 1979 (aged 82)

Clarence E. Wagner was Mayor of Long Beach, California.

== Biography ==
Wagner was born on September 6, 1896, in Antigo, Wisconsin, and was of German ancestry. He died on July 26, 1979.

== Career ==
Wagner served twice as Mayor of Long Beach from 1938 to 1939, and subsequently from 1942 to 1945.
