= Pine Canyon, California =

- Census-designated place
- Location within California Location within the United States
- Coordinates: 36°10′19″N 121°08′35″W
- Country: United States
- State: California
- County: Monterey

Area
  - Total: 3.337 sq mi (8.642 km^{2})
  - Land: 3.336 sq mi (8.639 km^{2})
  - Water: 0.00077 sq mi (0.002 km^{2}) 0.03%
- Elevation: 515 ft (157 m)

Population (2020)
  - Total: 1,871
  - Density: 560.9/sq mi (216.6/km^{2})
- Time zone: UTC-8 (Pacific (PST))
  - Summer (DST): UTC-7 (PDT)
- ZIP Code: 93930 (King City)
- GNIS feature ID: 2583113

Pine Canyon is an unincorporated community and census-designated place (CDP) in Monterey County, California, United States, just south of King City. Pine Canyon sits at an elevation of 515 feet (157 m). As of the 2020 census, the population was 1,871.

== Geography ==
Pine Canyon is in eastern Monterey County, on the southwestern side of the Salinas Valley. It is 3 miles (5 km) south of King City and less than 1 mile (1.6 km) south of U.S. Route 101, which leads northwest 45 miles (72 km) to Salinas, the county seat, and southeast 55 miles (89 km) to Paso Robles.

According to the United States Census Bureau, the Pine Canyon CDP covers an area of 3.3 square miles (8.5 km^{2}), of which 0.001 square miles (0.64 acres), or 0.03%, are water.

== Demographics ==
Historical population
Census	Pop.	Note	%±
2010	1,822		—
2020	1,871		2.7%
U.S. Decennial Census; 2000 2010

Pine Canyon first appeared as a census designated place in the 2010 U.S. census.

=== 2020 census ===
As of the 2020 census, Pine Canyon had a population of 1,871. The population density was 560.9 inhabitants per square mile (216.6/km^{2}). Of residents, 24.6% lived in urban areas and 75.4% lived in rural areas.

The median age was 37.7 years. The age distribution was 468 people (25.0%) under the age of 18, 194 people (10.4%) aged 18 to 24, 438 people (23.4%) aged 25 to 44, 493 people (26.3%) aged 45 to 64, and 278 people (14.9%) who were 65 years of age or older. For every 100 females there were 100.3 males, and for every 100 females age 18 and over there were 98.7 males age 18 and over.

The whole population lived in households. There were 575 households, out of which 196 (34.1%) had children under the age of 18 living in them, 332 (57.7%) were married-couple households, 37 (6.4%) were cohabiting couple households, 132 (23.0%) had a female householder with no spouse or partner present, and 74 (12.9%) had a male householder with no spouse or partner present. 112 households (19.5%) were one person, and 60 (10.4%) were one person aged 65 or older. The average household size was 3.25. There were 436 families (75.8% of all households).

There were 589 housing units at an average density of 176.6 units per square mile (68.2 units/km^{2}), of which 575 (97.6%) were occupied. Of these, 440 (76.5%) were owner-occupied, and 135 (23.5%) were occupied by renters. Of all housing units, 2.4% were vacant. The homeowner vacancy rate was 0.5% and the rental vacancy rate was 3.6%.

Racial composition as of the 2020 census
Race	Number	Percent
White	736	39.3%
Black or African American	8	0.4%
American Indian and Alaska Native	97	5.2%
Asian	16	0.9%
Native Hawaiian and Other Pacific Islander	2	0.1%
Some other race	549	29.3%
Two or more races	463	24.7%
Hispanic or Latino (of any race)	1,207	64.5%

== Utilities ==
Pine Canyon is served by the Little Bear Water Company.
