= George Kirstein =

American publisher and executive

- Born: George G. Kirstein; December 10, 1909; Boston, US
- Died: April 3, 1986 (aged 76); Mamaroneck, New York, US
- Occupations: publisher, business executive
- Years active: 1938–1971
- Spouse: Elinor Ferry

George Kirstein (December 10, 1909 – April 3, 1986) was publisher and principal owner of The Nation magazine from 1955 to 1965.

== Background ==
George G. Kirstein was born on December 10, 1909, Boston. He attended the Berkshire School, a private boarding school in Sheffield, Massachusetts and graduated in 1929. He attended Harvard College and graduated in 1933.

== Career ==
After Harvard, Kirstein went to Hollywood, where he worked as an assistant director at RKO. He then worked at Bloomingdale's from 1938 to 1941.

During World War II, he served as executive secretary of the National Defense Mediation Board and the National War Labor Board. He also served as a lieutenant in the U.S. Navy, stationed in the South Pacific from 1943 to 1945. He worked five years as a management labor-consultant, then became executive vice president of the Health Insurance Plan of Greater New York from 1950 to 1955.

He then bought and published The Nation from 1955 to 1965. In its obituary, The New York Times wrote that he was “instrumental in preserving The Nation's liberal independent voice.” The magazine became solvent under his guidance and won many awards.

He headed the Mamaroneck Historical Society from 1965 until his retirement in 1971. He was a trustee of Montefiore Medical Center in the Bronx. He was also a member of the New York Foundation.

== Personal ==
Kirstein was married to Elinor Ferry, a member of the Independent-Socialist Party and lifelong support of Alger Hiss.

He sailed often with friend Robert Penn Warren.

== Death ==
Kirstein died from a heart attack at his home in Mamaroneck, New York, aged 76.

== Works ==
- The Rich: Are They Different? (1968)
- "Better Giving" (1975)
- "Learning to Sail the Hard Way" (1979)
