= Oscar Hauge =

American politician (1868–1945)

Member of Minnesota Legislature
- In office 1911–1912

Member of Los Angeles County Board of Supervisors
- In office 1938–1944

Personal details
- Born: September 17, 1868
- Died: June 23, 1945 (aged 76)

Oscar L. Hauge (September 17, 1868—June 23, 1945) was an American politician.

He served in the Minnesota Legislature in 1911 and 1912 and then served on the Los Angeles County Board of Supervisors from 1938 until 1944.

== Biography ==
Hauge was born on a Minnesota farm on September 17, 1868. He was mayor of Long Beach, Calif., from 1927 to 1930. On December 1, 1938, he was appointed to the Los Angeles County Board of Supervisors to fill the vacancy created by the resignation of Leland M. Ford, who had just been elected to the United States Congress. He served until 1944.

Hauge's membership in the KKK was not known to the public while he was in office, but his KKK membership medal and ribbon remains in the Long Beach Library vault.

== Early career ==
At only age 21, Hauge served as township assessor in Faribault County. He then served in the Minnesota House of Representatives in 1911 and 1912 and was a Republican. Hauge later moved to Miles City, Montana where he served as chairman of the Republican Central Committee. In 1913 Hauge moved to Long Beach and participated in civic affairs. Hauge was also a member of the State Department of Finance for several years and from 1938 to 1944 he served as county supervisor for the Fourth District.

== Education ==
Hauge went to school in Chicago and graduated with a degree in dentistry.

== Death ==
On June 23, 1945, he died of a heart attack.

Preceded by Leland M. Ford	Los Angeles County Board of Supervisors; 4th district 1938—1944	Succeeded by Raymond V. Darby
Preceded by Fillmore Condit	8th Mayor of Long Beach; 1927 – 1930	Succeeded by Asa E. Fickling
