= Ward Johnson =

American politician

William W. Johnson
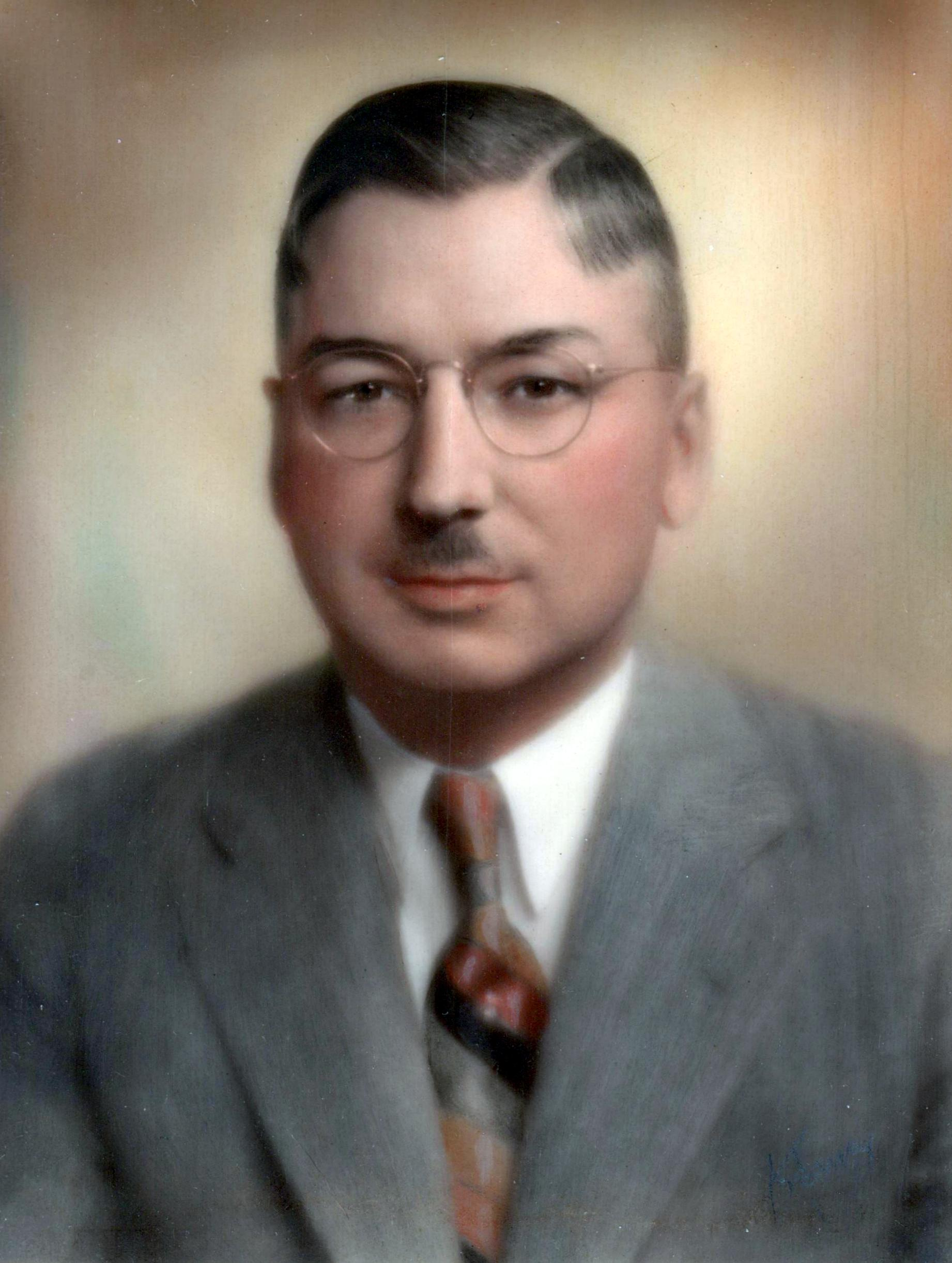

Member of the U.S. House of Representatives from California's 18th district
- In office January 3, 1941 – January 3, 1945
- Preceded by: Thomas M. Eaton
- Succeeded by: Clyde Doyle

Personal details
- Born: William Ward Johnson; March 9, 1892 Brighton, Iowa
- Died: June 8, 1963 (aged 71) Long Beach, California
- Resting place: Forest Lawn Memorial Park (Long Beach)
- Party: Republican
- Spouse: Grace Rebecca Songer
- Children: George Robert Johnson, Mary Jean Johnson, Walter Franklin Johnson
- Profession: Banker, Attorney

William Ward Johnson (March 9, 1892 – June 8, 1963) was an American lawyer and politician who served two terms as a U.S. representative from California from 1941 to 1945.

== Biography ==
Born in Brighton, Washington County, Iowa, Johnson attended the public schools at Brighton and at Twin Falls, Idaho, and the University of California at Berkeley in 1913 and 1914. He was graduated from the law school of the University of Southern California at Los Angeles in 1925.

=== Career ===
He served as member of the Idaho National Guard in 1910 and 1911. After that, he worked as bookkeeper, stenographer, and manager of an automobile company at Montpelier, Idaho, and Price, Utah from 1912 to 1918. He engaged in the mercantile business in Idaho and Utah from 1918 to 1922. He also engaged in the banking and oil business at Twin Falls, Idaho, and Long Beach, California.

He was admitted to the bar in 1925 and commenced practice as a lawyer in Long Beach.

=== Congress ===
Johnson was elected as a Republican to the Seventy-seventh and Seventy-eighth Congresses (January 3, 1941 – January 3, 1945). He was an unsuccessful candidate for reelection in 1944 to the Seventy-ninth Congress.

=== Later career and death ===
He resumed the practice of law in Long Beach, California, until his death there on June 8, 1963. He was interred in Sunnyside Mausoleum.

== Electoral history ==
United States House of Representatives elections, 1940
Party	Candidate	Votes	%
Republican	William Ward Johnson	73,932	54.4
Democratic	Byron N. Scott	60,764	44.7
Communist	George R. Ashby	1,355	0.9
Total votes		136,051	100.0
Turnout			
Republican hold			

United States House of Representatives elections, 1942
Party	Candidate	Votes	%
Republican	William Ward Johnson (inc.)	53,136	56.8
Democratic	Francis H. Gentry	40,339	43.2
Total votes		93,475	100.0
Turnout			
Republican hold			

United States House of Representatives elections, 1944
Party	Candidate	Votes	%
Democratic	Clyde Doyle	95,090	55.7
Republican	William Ward Johnson (inc.)	75,749	44.3
Total votes		170,839	100.0
Turnout			
Democratic gain from Republican			

U.S. House of Representatives
Preceded by Vacant since September 1939 last held by Thomas M. Eaton	Member of the U.S. House of Representatives from California's 18th congressional district January 1941 - January 1945	Succeeded by Clyde Doyle
