= Lyman B. Sutter =

American politician

18th Mayor of Long Beach
- In office 1953–1954

Personal details
- Born: June 14, 1906 Burlington, Iowa
- Died: August 22, 1963 (aged 57)
- Children: a son
- Education: Monmouth College, B.A.; Harvard Law School, J.D.
- Occupation: attorney and judge

Lyman B. Sutter (June 14, 1906 – August 22, 1963) was the Mayor of Long Beach, California from 1953 to 1954. Prior to that he was a Judge and served on the city council. The Sutter district is named after him.

== Personal information ==
Sutter was born in Burlington, Iowa, on June 14, 1906.

== Education ==
He came to Long Beach after he graduated from Monmouth College with a Bachelor of Arts degree and Harvard Law School.

== Career ==
Judge Sutter served the city of Long Beach, California as Mayor, Vice-Mayor and City Prosecutor. In 1932, he was admitted to the State Bar and then practiced law for seven years. He was later elected as City Prosecutor, where he worked until he resigned to enter the military service after war broke out. He then returned to Long Beach and resumed his private practice until 1950, when he was elected to the City Council. In 1953, Sutter ran for the municipal court bench when Judge Charles D. Wallace announced he would not run for re-election. Sutter won the election, and was appointed to the bench by Governor Goodwin Knight. Sutter also served as President of the Long Beach Area Council of the Boy Scouts in 1956 and 1957.

== Death ==
Judge Sutter died from cancer at the age of 57; his wife, and son survived him.
