= Ernie Kell =

American mayor (1928–2017)

25th Mayor of Long Beach
- In office 1984–1994
- Preceded by: Thomas J. Clark
- Succeeded by: Beverly O'Neill

Personal details
- Born: Ernest Eugene Kell Jr. July 5, 1928 Washburn, North Dakota
- Died: April 29, 2017 (aged 88) Long Beach, California
- Spouse: Jackie Kell

Ernest Eugene Kell Jr. (July 5, 1928 – April 29, 2017) served as mayor of Long Beach, California from 1984 to 1994, and as a city councilor for 13 years.

== Life and career ==
Kell was born into modest circumstances on a farm in Washburn, North Dakota. His family moved to Wilmington during the Great Depression, where he would graduate from Phineas Banning High School. He received an associate degree from Long Beach City College, and attended California State University, Long Beach.

Kell was a United States Merchant Marine, and also United States Army veteran of the Korean War. He would later own a drafting and contracting company. In 1973, he married his wife Jackie, herself a Long Beach city councilor from 1998 to 2006. Kell died from cancer at his home in the El Dorado Park neighborhood of Long Beach. He was 88.
