= Bob Foster (politician) =

American businessman and politician (1947–2025)

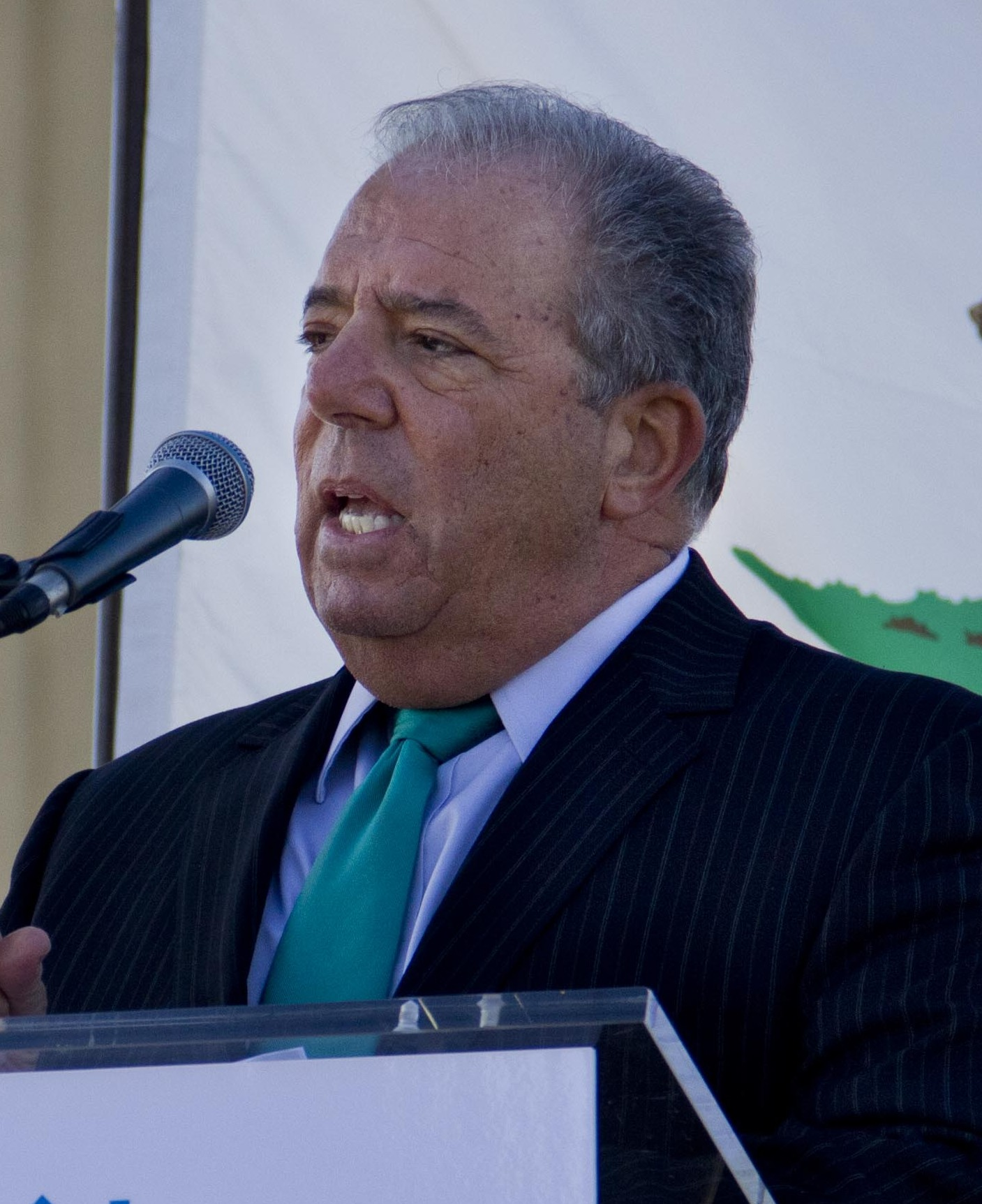
- Foster in 2013

27th Mayor of Long Beach
- In office July 18, 2006 – July 15, 2014
- Preceded by: Beverly O'Neill
- Succeeded by: Robert Garcia

President, Southern California Edison
- In office 2002–2006

CSU Board of Trustees
- In office 1998–2006

Personal details
- Born: January 1, 1947 New York City, U.S.
- Died: November 30, 2025 (aged 78) Palm Springs, California, U.S.
- Education: San Jose State University
- Profession: Politician, businessman

Robert Foster (January 1, 1947 – November 30, 2025) was an American businessman and politician who served as the mayor of Long Beach, California. He was elected in a runoff election in 2006. Prior to serving as mayor, Foster climbed the ranks of Southern California Edison, becoming president in 2002. Foster was appointed to the California State University Board of Trustees in 1998 by Governor Pete Wilson. He had previously worked for the California State Senate as a consultant on state energy policy.

== Early life and career ==
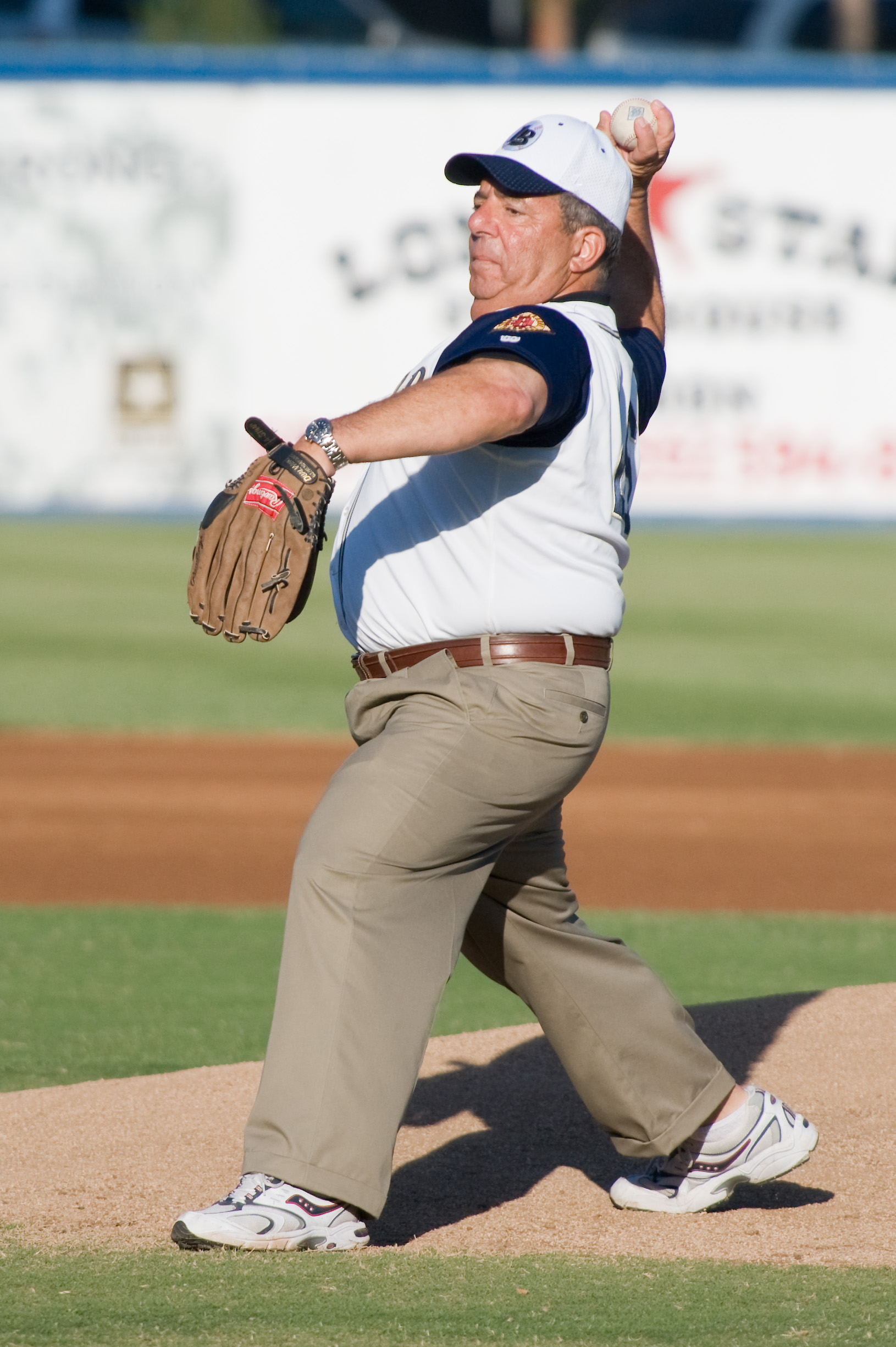
Foster in 2008 at Blair Field.

Foster was born and raised in Brooklyn, New York. He attended San Jose State University for his undergraduate studies, majoring in public administration. During his college years, he installed carpet to put himself through college, and on weekends while working at the Sacramento State Capitol, and Energy Committee. This was helpful during the early years having a family. After graduating, he began working for the California State Senate while he began PhD coursework in political science at the University of California, Davis. Later, Foster worked for the Senate Energy Committee, where he helped develop legislation that created statewide energy efficiency standards. He also taught for one semester as the "Leader-in-Residence" in the Department of Political Science at San Jose State University.

=== Election ===
Noting his experience working in the private and public sectors, Foster campaigned on a platform that called for an end to the city's mounting deficit. He also advocated adding 100 new police officers to the streets of Long Beach and reducing traffic and pollution permeating from the Port of Long Beach. Foster won the June 6, 2006, election with 57.2% of the vote.

=== CAISO ===
While serving as mayor, Foster was appointed by the governor to the Board of Governors of the state's electricity grid manager, the California Independent System Operator.

== Personal life and death ==
Foster and his wife, Nancy, were long-time residents of Sacramento and Long Beach. They had two sons, and three grandchildren. Foster died on November 30, 2025, at the age of 78.
