= Beverly O'Neill =

American politician (born 1930)

26th Mayor of Long Beach
- In office 1994–2006
- Preceded by: Ernie Kell
- Succeeded by: Robert "Bob" Foster

63rd President of the United States Conference of Mayors
- In office 2005–2006
- Preceded by: Don Plusquellic
- Succeeded by: Michael Guido

Personal details
- Born: September 8, 1930 (age 95) Long Beach, California
- Spouse: Bill O'Neill
- Profession: teacher

Beverly Joy O'Neill (née Lewis; born September 8, 1930) is an American politician. She served as mayor of Long Beach, California from 1994 to 2006. She is the only three-term citywide elected mayor of Long Beach, having won her third term as a write-in candidate because of Long Beach's term limits law preventing a two-term mayor from appearing on the ballot.

== Life and career ==
O'Neill is a graduate of Long Beach Polytechnic High School, and an alumnus of both California State University, Long Beach (B.A. 1952, M.A. 1956) and USC (Ed.D. 1977).

O'Neill's parents moved from South Dakota to Long Beach before she was born. She married her high school beau, Bill, in 1952.

O'Neill spent 31 years at Long Beach City College, beginning as a music instructor and women's advisor, and rising to the level of superintendent-president.

From 2005 to 2006, she served as President of the United States Conference of Mayors.

The Beverly O'Neill Theater within the Long Beach Convention and Entertainment Center is named for her.
