= List of mayors of Long Beach, California =

Mayor of Long Beach
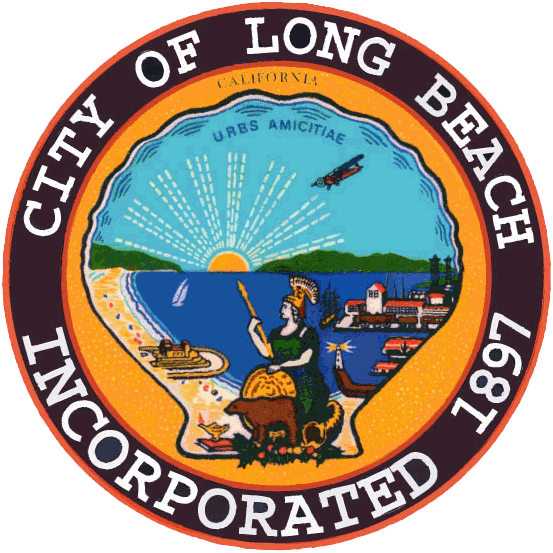
- Seal of Long Beach

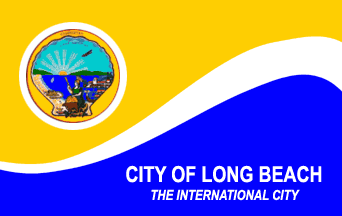
- Flag of Long Beach

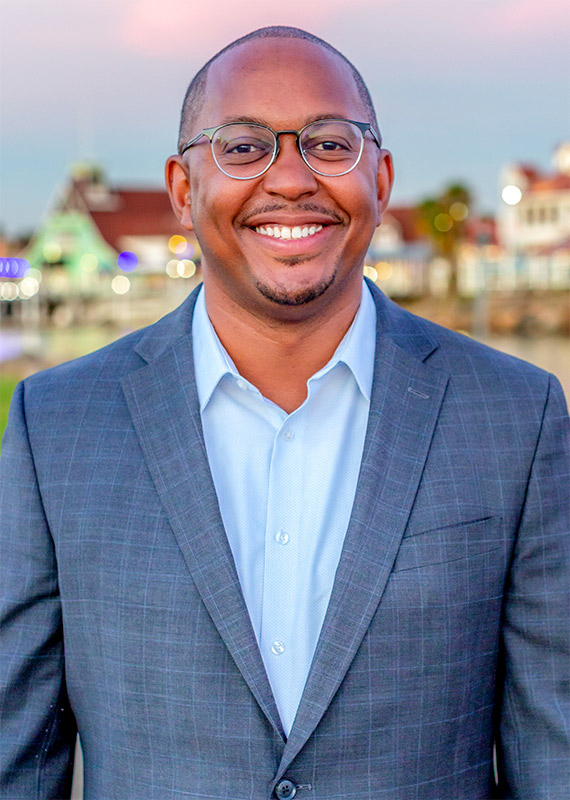
- Incumbent; Rex Richardson since December 20, 2022
- Term length: Four years (two terms with unlimited opportunities to run as a write-in candidate to a maximum of three terms within a lifetime)
- Precursor: President of the Board of Trustees
- Inaugural holder: Charles H. Windham
- Website: longbeach.gov/mayor/

This is a list of mayors of Long Beach, California.

The current mayor is Rex Richardson who has been in office since December 20, 2022. He is the first black person to hold the position.

== History ==
Prior its creation, the equivalent to the office of mayor was referred to as the President of the Board of Trustees. The title of mayor was officially created in 1908, following the completion of the new city charter. Until 1988, the mayor was indirectly elected by the city council from amongst themselves. The first mayor to be directly elected was Ernie Kell in 1988.

== List of Mayors ==
| Term | Image | Name |
|---|---|---|
| 1908 – 1912 | | Charles H. Windham |
| 1912 – 1914 | | Ira S. Hatch |
| 1914 – 1915 | | Louis N. Whealton |
| 1915 – 1921 | | William T. Lisenby |
| 1921 – 1924 | | Charles A. Buffum |
| 1924 – 1926 | | Ray R. Clark |
| 1926 – 1927 | | Fillmore Condit |
| 1927 – 1930 | | Oscar Hauge |
| 1930 – 1933 | | Asa E. Fickling |
| 1933 – 1934 | | M. E. Paddock |
| 1934 – 1936 | | Carl Fletcher |
| 1936 – 1938 | | Thomas M. Eaton |
| 1938 – 1939 | | Clarence E. Wagner |
| 1939 – 1942 | | Francis H. Gentry |
| 1942 – 1945 | | Clarence E. Wagner |
| 1945 – 1947 | | Herbert E. Lewis |
| 1947 – 1953 | | Burton W. Chace |
| 1953 – 1954 | | Lyman B. Sutter |
| 1954 – 1957 | | George Vermillion |
| 1957 – 1960 | | Ray C. Kealer |
| 1960 – 1975 | | Edwin W. Wade |
| 1975 – 1980 | | Thomas Clark |
| 1980 – 1982 | | Eunice Sato |
| 1982 – 1984 | | Thomas Clark |
| 1984 – 1994 | | Ernie Kell |
| 1994 – 2006 | | Beverly O'Neill |
| 2006 – 2014 | | Robert "Bob" Foster |
| 2014 – 2022 | | Robert Garcia |
| 2022 – Present | | Rex Richardson |

== See also ==
- Timeline of Long Beach, California
