= 2024 California State Assembly election =

- November 5, 2024

All 80 seats in the California State Assembly 41 seats needed for a majority
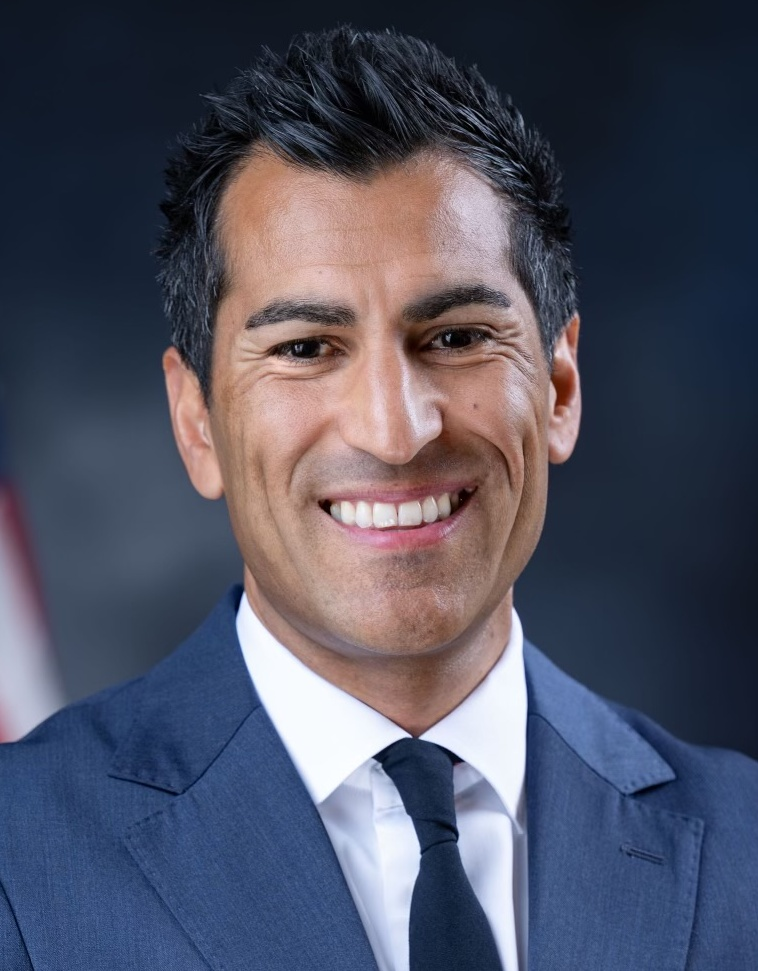

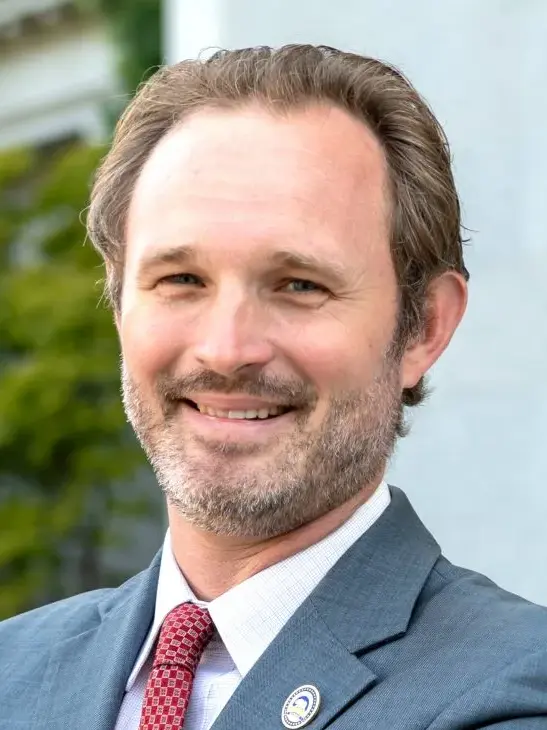
	Majority party	Minority party
Leader	Robert Rivas	James Gallagher
Party	Democratic	Republican
Leader since	June 30, 2023	February 8, 2022
Leader's seat	29th–Hollister	3rd–Yuba City
Last election	62 seats, 60.9%	18 seats, 37.7%
Seats before	62	18
Seats won	60	20
Seats after	60	19 (Note: In the 32nd Assembly district, the Republican candidate Vince Fong (now a member of the US Congress) won but did not take his seat because he withdrew from the race (but his name remained on the ballot).)
Seat change	▼2	▲2
Popular vote	8,603,080	5,951,101
Percentage	58.76%	40.64%
Swing	▼2.10pp	▲2.99pp
- Republican gain Democratic hold Republican hold Vacant seat 50–60% 60–70% 70–80% 80–90% >90% 50–60% 60–70% 70–80%
Speaker before election
Robert Rivas
Democratic
Elected Speaker
Robert Rivas
Democratic

The 2024 California State Assembly election was held on Tuesday, November 5, 2024, with the primary election being held on March 5, 2024. All of the seats of the California State Assembly were elected as part of the 2024 California elections.

== Outgoing incumbents ==
=== Democrats ===
- 2nd: Jim Wood retired.
- 6th: Kevin McCarty retired to run for mayor of Sacramento.
- 13th: Carlos Villapudua retired to run for state senate.
- 15th: Tim Grayson retired to run for state senate.
- 19th: Phil Ting was term-limited.
- 26th: Evan Low retired to run for U.S. House.
- 36th: Eduardo Garcia retired.
- 41st: Chris Holden was term-limited (ran for Los Angeles County Board of Supervisors).
- 43rd: Luz Rivas retired to run for U.S. House.
- 44th: Laura Friedman retired to run for U.S. House.
- 50th: Eloise Reyes retired to run for state senate.
- 52nd: Wendy Carrillo retired to run for Los Angeles City Council.
- 53rd: Freddie Rodriguez was term-limited.
- 54th: Miguel Santiago retired to run for Los Angeles City Council.
- 57th: Reggie Jones-Sawyer was term-limited (ran for Los Angeles City Council).
- 58th: Sabrina Cervantes retired to run for state senate.
- 62nd: Anthony Rendon was term-limited.
- 76th: Brian Maienschein was term-limited (ran for San Diego City Attorney).
- 79th: Akilah Weber retired to run for state senate.

=== Republicans ===
- 1st: Megan Dahle retired to run for state senate.
- 8th: Jim Patterson was term-limited.
- 33rd: Devon Mathis retired.
- 75th: Marie Waldron was term-limited.

== Predictions ==
Source	Ranking	As of
Sabato's Crystal Ball	Safe D	October 23, 2024

== Summary by district ==
† - Incumbent not seeking re-election

District	Incumbent	Party	Elected member	Party
1st	Megan Dahle†	Rep	Heather Hadwick	Rep
2nd	Jim Wood†	Dem	Chris Rogers	Dem
3rd	James Gallagher	Rep	James Gallagher	Rep
4th	Cecilia Aguiar-Curry	Dem	Cecilia Aguiar-Curry	Dem
5th	Joe Patterson	Rep	Joe Patterson	Rep
6th	Kevin McCarty†	Dem	Maggy Krell	Dem
7th	Josh Hoover	Rep	Josh Hoover	Rep
8th	Jim Patterson†	Rep	David Tangipa	Rep
9th	Heath Flora	Rep	Heath Flora	Rep
10th	Stephanie Nguyen	Dem	Stephanie Nguyen	Dem
11th	Lori Wilson	Dem	Lori Wilson	Dem
12th	Damon Connolly	Dem	Damon Connolly	Dem
13th	Carlos Villapudua†	Dem	Rhodesia Ransom	Dem
14th	Buffy Wicks	Dem	Buffy Wicks	Dem
15th	Tim Grayson†	Dem	Anamarie Avila Farias	Dem
16th	Rebecca Bauer-Kahan	Dem	Rebecca Bauer-Kahan	Dem
17th	Matt Haney	Dem	Matt Haney	Dem
18th	Mia Bonta	Dem	Mia Bonta	Dem
19th	Phil Ting†	Dem	Catherine Stefani	Dem
20th	Liz Ortega	Dem	Liz Ortega	Dem
21st	Diane Papan	Dem	Diane Papan	Dem
22nd	Juan Alanis	Rep	Juan Alanis	Rep
23rd	Marc Berman	Dem	Marc Berman	Dem
24th	Alex Lee	Dem	Alex Lee	Dem
25th	Ash Kalra	Dem	Ash Kalra	Dem
26th	Evan Low†	Dem	Patrick Ahrens	Dem
27th	Esmeralda Soria	Dem	Esmeralda Soria	Dem
28th	Gail Pellerin	Dem	Gail Pellerin	Dem
29th	Robert Rivas	Dem	Robert Rivas	Dem
30th	Dawn Addis	Dem	Dawn Addis	Dem
31st	Joaquin Arambula	Dem	Joaquin Arambula	Dem
32nd	Vacant (Note: Republican Vince Fong resigned May 24, 2024 after being elected to the U.S. House of Representatives in a special election.)		Vacant (Note: Despite withdrawing his candidacy, Fong remained on the ballot and ultimately won the general election. He did not take his seat and a special election was held on February 25, 2025.)	
33rd	Devon Mathis†	Rep	Alexandra Macedo	Rep
34th	Tom Lackey	Rep	Tom Lackey	Rep
35th	Jasmeet Bains	Dem	Jasmeet Bains	Dem
36th	Eduardo Garcia†	Dem	Jeff Gonzalez	Rep
37th	Gregg Hart	Dem	Gregg Hart	Dem
38th	Steve Bennett	Dem	Steve Bennett	Dem
39th	Juan Carrillo	Dem	Juan Carrillo	Dem
40th	Pilar Schiavo	Dem	Pilar Schiavo	Dem
41st	Chris Holden†	Dem	John Harabedian	Dem
42nd	Jacqui Irwin	Dem	Jacqui Irwin	Dem
43rd	Luz Rivas†	Dem	Celeste Rodriguez	Dem
44th	Laura Friedman†	Dem	Nick Schultz	Dem
45th	James Ramos	Dem	James Ramos	Dem
46th	Jesse Gabriel	Dem	Jesse Gabriel	Dem
47th	Greg Wallis	Rep	Greg Wallis	Rep
48th	Blanca Rubio	Dem	Blanca Rubio	Dem
49th	Mike Fong	Dem	Mike Fong	Dem
50th	Eloise Reyes†	Dem	Robert Garcia	Dem
51st	Rick Zbur	Dem	Rick Zbur	Dem
52nd	Wendy Carrillo†	Dem	Jessica Caloza	Dem
53rd	Freddie Rodriguez†	Dem	Michelle Rodriguez	Dem
54th	Miguel Santiago†	Dem	Mark Gonzalez	Dem
55th	Isaac Bryan	Dem	Isaac Bryan	Dem
56th	Lisa Calderon	Dem	Lisa Calderon	Dem
57th	Reggie Jones-Sawyer†	Dem	Sade Elhawary	Dem
58th	Sabrina Cervantes†	Dem	Leticia Castillo	Rep
59th	Phillip Chen	Rep	Phillip Chen	Rep
60th	Corey Jackson	Dem	Corey Jackson	Dem
61st	Tina McKinnor	Dem	Tina McKinnor	Dem
62nd	Anthony Rendon†	Dem	Jose Solache	Dem
63rd	Bill Essayli	Rep	Bill Essayli	Rep
64th	Blanca Pacheco	Dem	Blanca Pacheco	Dem
65th	Mike Gipson	Dem	Mike Gipson	Dem
66th	Al Muratsuchi	Dem	Al Muratsuchi	Dem
67th	Sharon Quirk-Silva	Dem	Sharon Quirk-Silva	Dem
68th	Avelino Valencia	Dem	Avelino Valencia	Dem
69th	Josh Lowenthal	Dem	Josh Lowenthal	Dem
70th	Tri Ta	Rep	Tri Ta	Rep
71st	Kate Sanchez	Rep	Kate Sanchez	Rep
72nd	Diane Dixon	Rep	Diane Dixon	Rep
73rd	Cottie Petrie-Norris	Dem	Cottie Petrie-Norris	Dem
74th	Laurie Davies	Rep	Laurie Davies	Rep
75th	Marie Waldron†	Rep	Carl DeMaio	Rep
76th	Brian Maienschein†	Dem	Darshana Patel	Dem
77th	Tasha Boerner	Dem	Tasha Boerner	Dem
78th	Chris Ward	Dem	Chris Ward	Dem
79th	Akilah Weber†	Dem	LaShae Sharp-Collins	Dem
80th	David Alvarez	Dem	David Alvarez	Dem

== District 1 ==
2024 California's 1st State Assembly district election
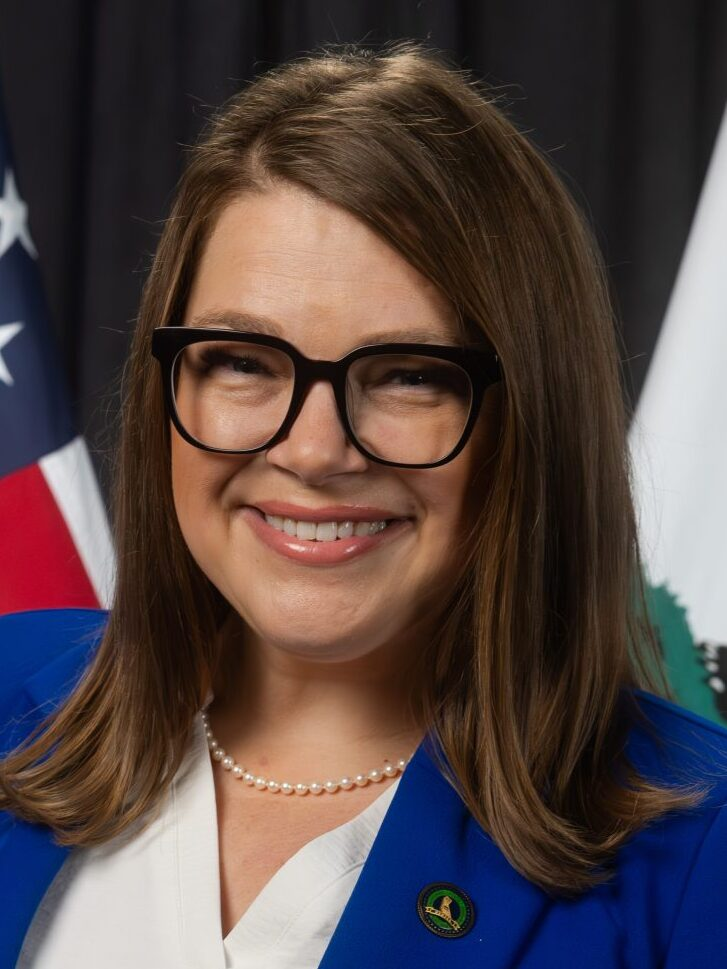

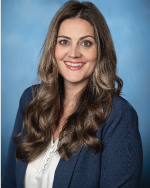
Candidate	Heather Hadwick	Tenessa Audette
Party	Republican	Republican
Popular vote	125,387	84,167
Percentage	59.8%	40.2%
State assemblymember before election
Megan Dahle
Republican
State assemblymember after election
Heather Hadwick
Republican

The incumbent was Republican Megan Dahle of Bieber, who ran for state senate.

=== Candidates ===
==== Advanced to general ====
- Tenessa Audette (Republican), mayor of Redding
- Heather Hadwick (Republican), safety and communications specialist at the Modoc County Office of Education

==== Eliminated in primary ====
- Melissa Hunt (Republican), Anderson city councilor
- Mark Mezzano (Republican), Redding city councilor

=== Endorsements ===
Heather Hadwick (R)

State legislators

- Brian Dahle, state senator
- Megan Dahle, state assemblywoman for this district

Local officials

- Aaron Albaugh, Lassen County Supervisor
- Les Baugh, Shasta County Supervisor
- Brandon Criss, Siskiyou County Supervisor
- Michael Dacquisto, Redding city councilor
- Chris Gallagher, Lassen County Supervisor
- Jason Ingram, Lassen County Supervisor
- Michael Kobseff, Siskiyou County Supervisor
- Jeremiah LaRue, Siskiyou County Sheriff
- Mark Mezzano, Redding city councilor and primary opponent

Labor unions

- California Professional Firefighters
Tenessa Audette (R)

Political parties

- American Independent Party

=== Fundraising ===
Campaign finance reports as of September 26, 2024
Candidate	Raised	Spent	Cash on hand
Heather Hadwick (R)	$175,815	$44,444	$76,512
Tenessa Audette (R)	$104,134	$95,677	$8,457
Source: Secretary of State of California

=== Results ===
2024 California's 1st State Assembly district election
Primary election
Party	Candidate	Votes	%
Republican	Heather Hadwick	41,939	35.6
Republican	Tenessa Audette	34,439	29.2
Republican	Mark Mezzano	30,090	25.5
Republican	Melissa Hunt	11,344	9.6
Total votes		117,812	100.0
General election
Republican	Heather Hadwick	125,387	59.8
Republican	Tenessa Audette	84,167	40.2
Total votes		209,554	100.0
Republican hold			

== District 2 ==
2024 California's 2nd State Assembly district election
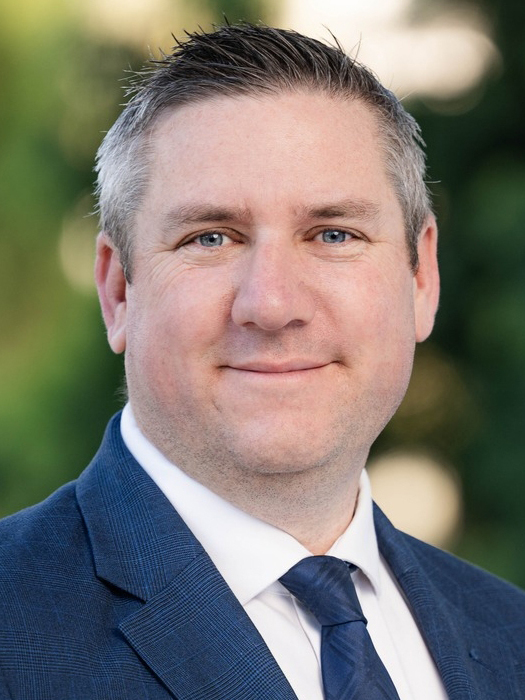

Candidate	Chris Rogers	Michael Greer
Party	Democratic	Republican
Popular vote	154,845	80,290
Percentage	65.9%	34.1%
State assemblymember before election
Jim Wood
Democratic
State assemblymember after election
Chris Rogers
Democratic

The incumbent was Democrat Jim Wood of Healdsburg, who did not run for reelection because of family reasons.

=== Candidates ===
- Cynthia Click (Democratic), sales manager
- Michael Greer (Republican), Del Norte County Office of Education trustee
- Rusty Hicks (Democratic), chair of the California Democratic Party
- Ariel Kelley (Democratic), Healdsburg city councilor
- Frankie Myers (Democratic), vice chair of the Yurok Tribe
- Chris Rogers (Democratic), Santa Rosa city councilor
- Ted Williams (Democratic), Mendocino County supervisor

==== Declined ====
- Jim Wood (Democratic), incumbent state assemblyman

=== Endorsements ===
Michael Greer (R)

Political parties

- California Republican Party
Rusty Hicks (D)

Labor unions

- AFSCME California
- California Faculty Association (co-endorsement with Rogers)
Chris Rogers (D)

State legislators

- Mike McGuire, state senator

Political parties

- California Working Families Party

Labor unions

- California Faculty Association (co-endorsement with Hicks)

=== Fundraising ===
Campaign finance reports as of January 25, 2024
Candidate	Raised	Spent	Cash on hand
Cynthia Click (D) (Note: Has not yet filed campaign finance data.)	–	–	–
Michael Greer (R)	$20,837	$13,868	$14,949
Rusty Hicks (D)	$37,735	$122,743	$442,405
Ariel Kelley (D)	$46,914	$123,754	$170,464
Frankie Myers (D)	$39,952	$6,292	$88,072
Chris Rogers (D)	$60,936	$27,651	$140,311
Ted Williams (D)	–	–	–
Source: Secretary of State of California

=== Results ===
2024 California's 2nd State Assembly district election
Primary election
Party	Candidate	Votes	%
Republican	Michael Greer	39,052	27.6
Democratic	Chris Rogers	27,291	19.3
Democratic	Rusty Hicks	25,962	18.3
Democratic	Ariel Kelley	19,740	14.0
Democratic	Frankie Myers	18,065	12.8
Democratic	Ted Williams	9,803	6.9
Democratic	Cynthia Click	1,575	1.1
Total votes		141,488	100.0
General election
Democratic	Chris Rogers	154,845	65.9
Republican	Michael Greer	80,290	34.1
Total votes		235,135	100.0
Democratic hold			

== District 3 ==
2024 California's 3rd State Assembly district election
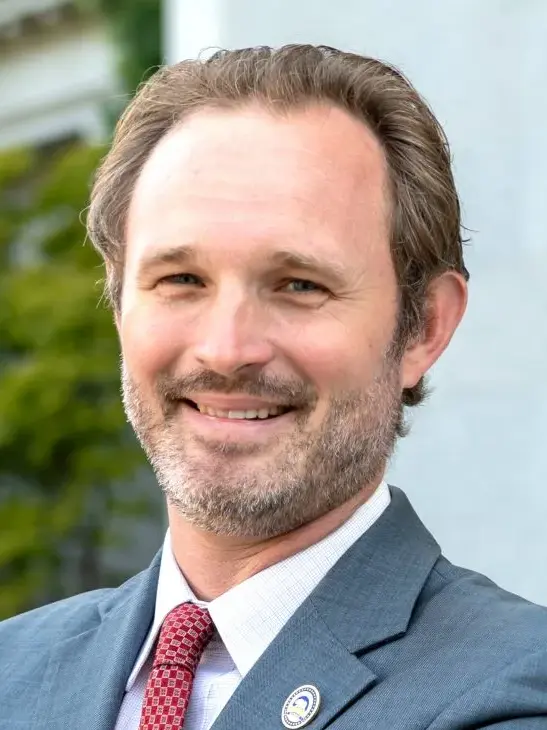

Candidate	James Gallagher	Aaron Draper
Party	Republican	Democratic
Popular vote	131,578	66,962
Percentage	66.3%	33.7%
State assemblymember before election
James Gallagher
Republican
State assemblymember after election
James Gallagher
Republican

=== Candidates ===
- Aaron Draper (Democratic), photography instructor at Chico State
- James Gallagher (Republican), incumbent state assemblymember and minority leader

=== Endorsements ===
James Gallagher (R)

Labor unions

- California Professional Firefighters

Political parties

- California Republican Party

=== Fundraising ===
Campaign finance reports as of January 25, 2024
Candidate	Raised	Spent	Cash on hand
Aaron Draper (D)	–	–	–
James Gallagher (R)	$37,150	$37,335	$778,316
Source: Secretary of State of California

=== Results ===
2024 California's 3rd State Assembly district election
Primary election
Party	Candidate	Votes	%
Republican	James Gallagher (incumbent)	76,570	68.4
Democratic	Aaron Draper	35,434	31.6
Total votes		112,004	100.0
General election
Republican	James Gallagher (incumbent)	131,578	66.3
Democratic	Aaron Draper	66,962	33.7
Total votes		198,540	100.0
Republican hold			

== District 4 ==
2024 California's 4th State Assembly district election
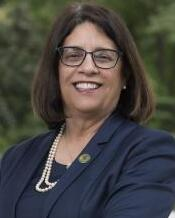

Candidate	Cecilia Aguiar-Curry	Darren Ellis
Party	Democratic	Republican
Popular vote	133,421	67,277
Percentage	66.5%	33.5%
State assemblymember before election
Cecilia Aguiar-Curry
Democratic
State assemblymember after election
Cecilia Aguiar-Curry
Democratic

=== Candidates ===
- Cecilia Aguiar-Curry (Democratic), incumbent state assemblymember
- Darren Ellis (Republican), legal consultant (write-in)
- Sherman McFarland (Democratic) (write-in)

=== Endorsements ===
Cecilia Aguiar-Curry (D)

Political parties

- California Democratic Party
- Yolo County Democratic Party

Labor unions

- AFSCME California

=== Fundraising ===
Campaign finance reports as of January 25, 2024
Candidate	Raised	Spent	Cash on hand
Cecilia Aguiar-Curry (D)	$23,000	$61,530	$442,890
Source: Secretary of State of California

=== Results ===
2024 California's 4th State Assembly district election
Primary election
Party	Candidate	Votes	%
Democratic	Cecilia Aguiar-Curry (incumbent)	78,623	99.3
Republican	Darren Ellis (write-in)	525	0.6
Democratic	Sherman McFarland (write-in)	102	0.1
Total votes		79,250	100.0
General election
Democratic	Cecilia Aguiar-Curry (incumbent)	133,421	66.5
Republican	Darren Ellis	67,277	33.5
Total votes		200,698	100.0
Democratic hold			

== District 5 ==
2024 California's 5th State Assembly district election
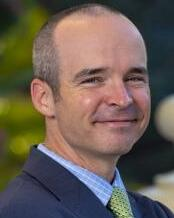

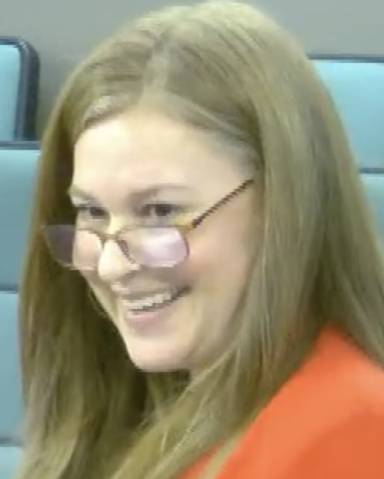
Candidate	Joe Patterson	Neva Parker
Party	Republican	Democratic
Popular vote	174,220	106,753
Percentage	62.0%	38.0%
State assemblymember before election
Joe Patterson
Republican
State assemblymember after election
Joe Patterson
Republican

=== Candidates ===
- Aabhash "ABG" Gautam (Republican), businessman
- Neva Parker (Democratic), nutrition business owner and vice chair of the Roseville Grants Advisory Commission
- Joe Patterson (Republican), incumbent state assemblymember
- Athena Singh (Democratic), business owner

=== Endorsements ===
Neva Parker (D)

Political parties

- California Democratic Party
Joe Patterson (R)

Labor unions

- California Professional Firefighters

Political parties

- California Republican Party

Newspapers

- The Sacramento Bee

=== Fundraising ===
Campaign finance reports as of January 25, 2024
Candidate	Raised	Spent	Cash on hand
Aabhash "ABG" Gautam (R)	–	–	–
Joe Patterson (R)	$5,750	$42,052	$198,806
Neva Parker (D)	$5,093	$8,292	$23,004
Athena Singh (D)	–	–	–
Source: Secretary of State of California

=== Results ===
2024 California's 5th State Assembly district election
Primary election
Party	Candidate	Votes	%
Republican	Joe Patterson (incumbent)	93,875	58.2
Democratic	Neva Parker	47,611	29.5
Democratic	Athena Singh	12,581	7.8
Republican	Aabhash Gautam	7,125	4.4
Total votes		161,192	100.0
General election
Republican	Joe Patterson (incumbent)	174,220	62.0
Democratic	Neva Parker	106,753	38.0
Total votes		280,973	100.0
Republican hold			

== District 6 ==
2024 California's 6th State Assembly district election
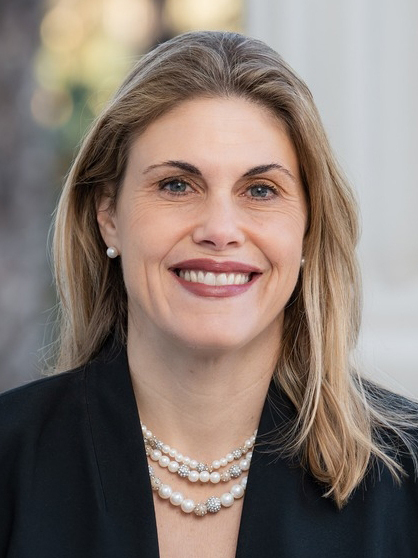

Candidate	Maggy Krell	Nikki Ellis
Party	Democratic	Republican
Popular vote	133,581	66,217
Percentage	66.9%	33.1%
State assemblymember before election
Kevin McCarty
Democratic
State assemblymember after election
Maggy Krell
Democratic

The incumbent was Kevin McCarty, who ran for mayor of Sacramento.

=== Candidates ===
- Emmanuel Amanfor (Democratic), chair of the Sacramento Housing and Redevelopment Agency Commission
- Nikki Ellis (Republican), international affairs specialist for the California Chamber of Commerce
- Sean Frame (Democratic), former El Dorado Union School Board trustee
- Rosanna Herber (Democratic), vice president of the Sacramento Municipal Utility District
- Maggy Krell (Democratic), California deputy attorney general and former chief legal counsel for Planned Parenthood California
- Carlos Marquez (Democratic), LGBTQ and civil rights lobbyist
- Kevin Olmar Martinez (Peace and Freedom), union representative
- Evan Minton (Democratic), nonprofit policy director
- Preston Romero (Republican), president of Log Cabin Republicans Sacramento
- Paula Villescaz (Democratic), San Juan Unified School Board trustee, former assistant secretary of the California Health and Human Services Agency, and runner-up for SD-06 in 2022

==== Withdrawn ====
- Alex Lazar (Democratic), former aide to U.S. Representative Nancy Pelosi

=== Endorsements ===
Preston Romero (R)

Political parties

- California Republican Party
Paula Villescaz

Local officials

- Darrell Steinberg, mayor of Sacramento
- Katie Valenzuela, Sacramento city councilor
- Mai Vang, Sacramento city councilor

Labor unions

- California Faculty Association

Newspapers

- The Sacramento Bee
Declined to endorse

Political parties

- California Democratic Party

=== Fundraising ===
Campaign finance reports as of January 25, 2024
Candidate	Raised	Spent	Cash on hand
Emmanuel Amanfor (D)	$2,102	$161	$1,208
Nikki Ellis (R)	–	–	–
Sean Frame (D)	$93,053	$26,431	$51,048
Rosanna Herber (D)	–	–	–
Maggy Krell (D)	–	–	–
Kevin Olmar Martinez (P&F)	–	–	–
Carlos Marquez III (D)	$42,715	$71,785	$128,259
Evan Minton (D)	$13,061	$22,553	$129,442
Preston Romero (R)	$1,100	$942	$700
Paula Villescaz (D)	$28,785	$30,826	$144,552
Source: Secretary of State of California

=== Results ===
2024 California's 6th State Assembly district election
Primary election
Party	Candidate	Votes	%
Democratic	Maggy Krell	25,879	25.0
Republican	Nikki Ellis	15,108	14.6
Republican	Preston Romero	14,505	14.0
Democratic	Paula Villescaz	13,780	13.3
Democratic	Carlos Marquez III	9,337	9.0
Democratic	Rosanna Herber	9,257	9.0
Democratic	Sean Frame	6,982	6.8
Democratic	Emmanuel Amanfor	3,920	3.8
Democratic	Evan Minton	2,706	2.6
Peace and Freedom	Kevin Olmar Martinez	1,861	1.8
Total votes		103,339	100.0
General election
Democratic	Maggy Krell	133,581	66.9
Republican	Nikki Ellis	66,217	33.1
Total votes		199,798	100.0
Democratic hold			

== District 7 ==
2024 California's 7th State Assembly district election
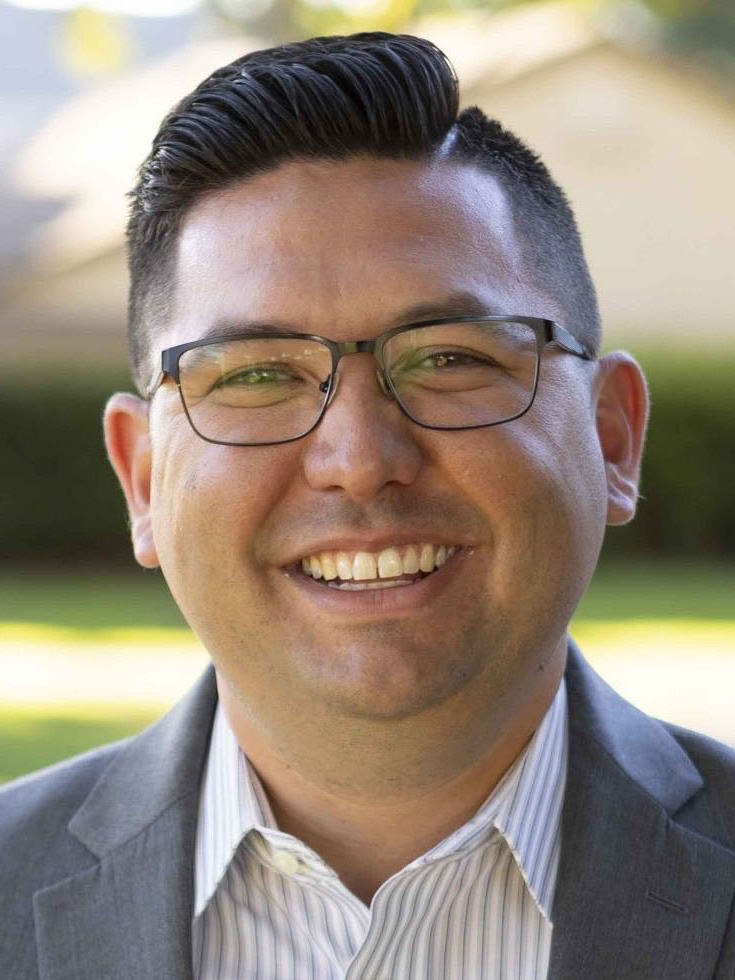

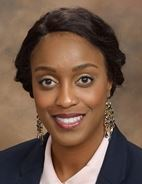
Candidate	Josh Hoover	Porsche Middleton
Party	Republican	Democratic
Popular vote	116,254	100,487
Percentage	53.6%	46.4%
State assemblymember before election
Josh Hoover
Republican
State assemblymember after election
Josh Hoover
Republican

=== Candidates ===
- YK Chalamcherla (Democratic), at-large Folsom city councilor
- Josh Hoover (Republican), incumbent state assemblymember
- Porsche Middleton (Democratic), Citrus Heights city councilor

=== Endorsements ===
Josh Hoover (R)

Labor unions

- California Professional Firefighters

Political parties

- California Republican Party
Porsche Middleton (D)

Political parties

- California Democratic Party

Labor unions

- California Faculty Association

Newspapers

- The Sacramento Bee

=== Fundraising ===
Campaign finance reports as of October 19, 2024
Candidate	Raised	Spent	Cash on hand
Josh Hoover (R)	$1,426,096	$1,674,325	$127,775
Porsche Middleton (D)	$1,489,048	$1,485,155	$160,607
Source: Secretary of State of California

=== Results ===
2024 California's 7th State Assembly district election
Primary election
Party	Candidate	Votes	%
Republican	Josh Hoover (incumbent)	59,398	52.7
Democratic	Porsche Middleton	33,045	29.3
Democratic	YK Chalamcherla	20,265	18.0
Total votes		112,708	100.0
General election
Republican	Josh Hoover (incumbent)	116,254	53.6
Democratic	Porsche Middleton	100,487	46.4
Total votes		216,741	100.0
Republican hold			

== District 8 ==
2024 California's 8th State Assembly district election
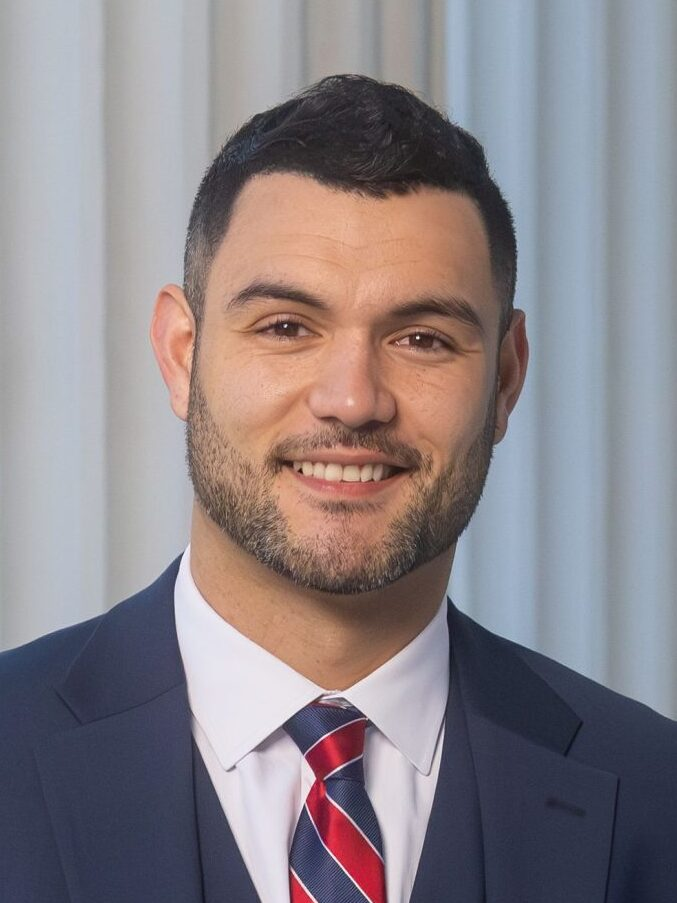

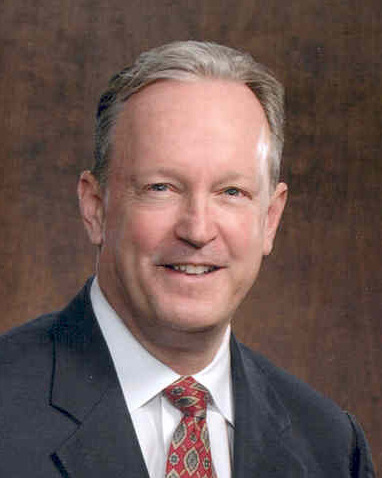
Candidate	David Tangipa	George Radanovich
Party	Republican	Republican
Popular vote	113,407	97,770
Percentage	53.7%	46.3%
State assemblymember before election
Jim Patterson
Republican
State assemblymember after election
David Tangipa
Republican

The incumbent was Republican Jim Patterson, who was term-limited.

=== Candidates ===
- Caleb Helsel (Democratic), substitute teacher
- Michael Matheson (no party preference), community organizer
- George Radanovich (Republican), former U.S. representative for California's 19th congressional district (1995–2011)
- David Tangipa (Republican), field representative for Fresno County supervisor Nathan Magsig and former Fresno State football player

==== Declined ====
- Frank Bigelow (Republican), former state assemblymember from the 5th district (endorsed Radanovich)

=== Endorsements ===
David Tangipa (R)

State assemblymembers

- Jim Patterson, AD-08 (2012–present)

Local officials

- Jerry Dyer, mayor of Fresno (2021–present)

Labor unions

- California Professional Firefighters
- Southwest Regional Council of Carpenters
George Radanovich (R)

State assemblymembers

- Frank Bigelow, AD-05 (2012–2022)

=== Fundraising ===
Campaign finance reports as of January 25, 2024
Candidate	Raised	Spent	Cash on hand
Caleb Helsel (D)	–	–	–
Michael Matheson (NPP)	–	–	–
George Radanovich (R)	–	–	–
David J. Tangipa (R)	$13,100	$15,449	$170,919
Source: Secretary of State of California

=== Results ===
2024 California's 8th State Assembly district election
Primary election
Party	Candidate	Votes	%
Republican	George Radanovich	48,868	36.1
Republican	David Tangipa	42,318	31.3
Democratic	Caleb Helsel	40,089	29.6
No party preference	Michael Matheson	4,097	3.0
Total votes		135,369	100.0
General election
Republican	David Tangipa	113,407	53.7
Republican	George Radanovich	97,770	46.3
Total votes		211,777	100.0
Republican hold			

== District 9 ==
2024 California's 9th State Assembly district election
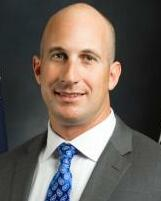

Candidate	Heath Flora	Tami Nobriga
Party	Republican	American Independent
Popular vote	129,268	55,169
Percentage	70.1%	29.9%
State assemblymember before election
Heath Flora
Republican
State assemblymember after election
Heath Flora
Republican

=== Candidates ===
- Heath Flora (Republican), incumbent state assemblymember
- Tami Nobriga (American Independent), retired businesswoman
- Rosella Rowlison (Democratic), high school teacher and former aide to U.S. Representative Zoe Lofgren (write-in)
- Belinda Smith (Democratic), business owner (write-in)

=== Endorsements ===
Heath Flora (R)

Labor unions

- California Professional Firefighters

Political parties

- California Republican Party

=== Fundraising ===
Campaign finance reports as of January 25, 2024
Candidate	Raised	Spent	Cash on hand
Heath Flora (R)	$13,900	$46,132	$53,076
Tami Nobriga (AI)	–	–	–
Source: Secretary of State of California

=== Results ===
2024 California's 9th State Assembly district election
Primary election
Party	Candidate	Votes	%
Republican	Heath Flora (incumbent)	65,952	73.2
American Independent	Tami Nobriga	21,946	24.4
Democratic	Rosella Rowlison (write-in)	2,139	2.4
Democratic	Belinda Smith (write-in)	87	0.1
Total votes		90,124	100.0
General election
Republican	Heath Flora (incumbent)	129,268	70.1
American Independent	Tami Nobriga	55,169	29.9
Total votes		184,437	100.0
Republican hold			

== District 10 ==
2024 California's 10th State Assembly district election
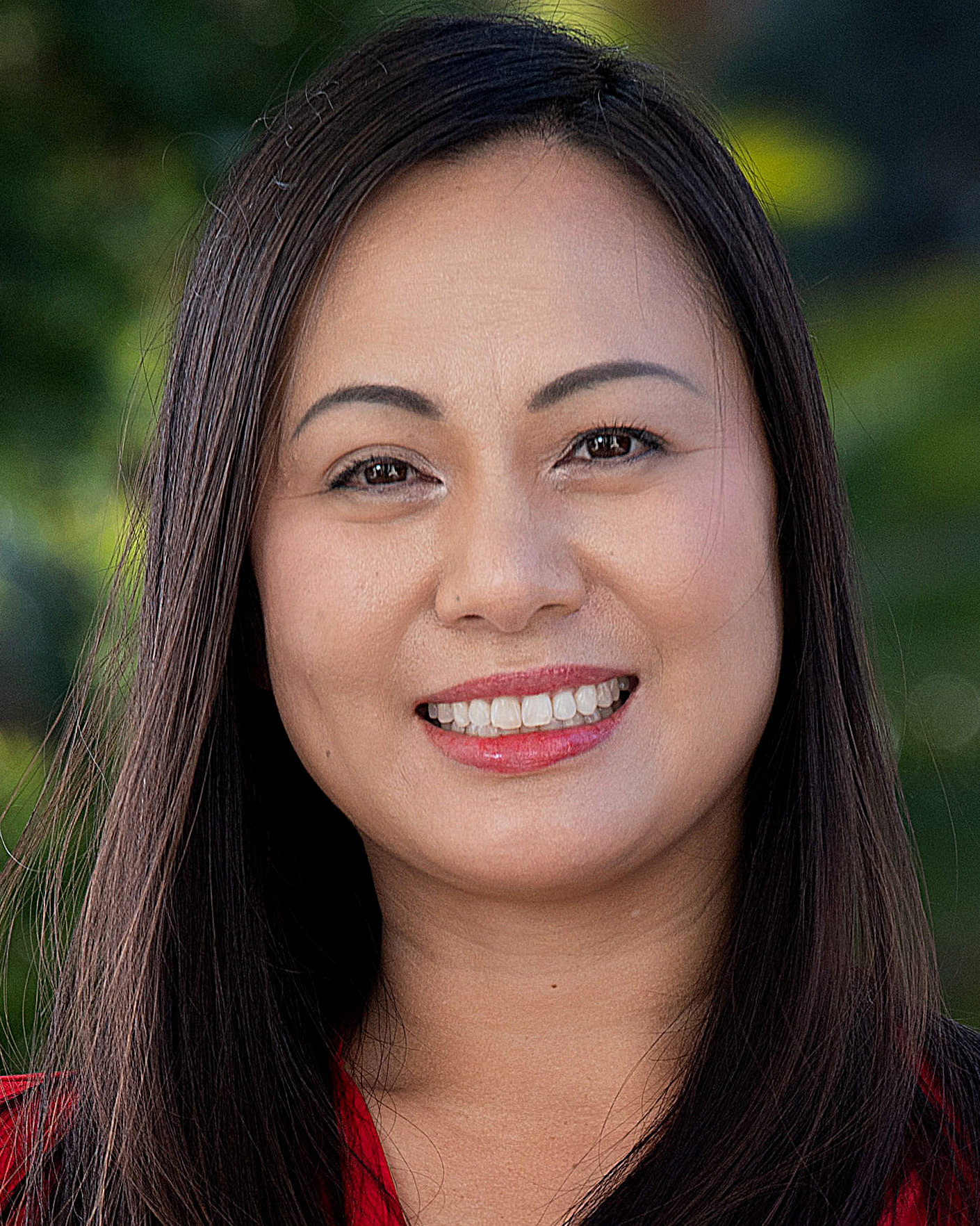

Candidate	Stephanie Nguyen	Vinaya Singh
Party	Democratic	Republican
Popular vote	124,509	59,665
Percentage	67.6%	32.4%
State assemblymember before election
Stephanie Nguyen
Democratic
State assemblymember after election
Stephanie Nguyen
Democratic

=== Candidates ===
- Stephanie Nguyen (Democratic), incumbent state assemblymember
- Vinaya Singh (Republican), retired engineer

=== Endorsements ===
Stephanie Nguyen (D)

Political parties

- California Democratic Party

Labor unions

- AFSCME California
Vinaya Singh (R)

Political parties

- California Republican Party

=== Fundraising ===
Campaign finance reports as of January 25, 2024
Candidate	Raised	Spent	Cash on hand
Stephanie Nguyen (D)	$6,500	$68,256	$171,487
Vinaya Singh (R)	$3,250	$4,424	$802
Source: Secretary of State of California

=== Results ===
2024 California's 10th State Assembly district election
Primary election
Party	Candidate	Votes	%
Democratic	Stephanie Nguyen (incumbent)	59,646	67.6
Republican	Vinaya Singh	28,630	32.4
Total votes		88,276	100.0
General election
Democratic	Stephanie Nguyen (incumbent)	124,509	67.6
Republican	Vinaya Singh	59,665	32.4
Total votes		184,174	100.0
Democratic hold			

== District 11 ==
2024 California's 11th State Assembly district election
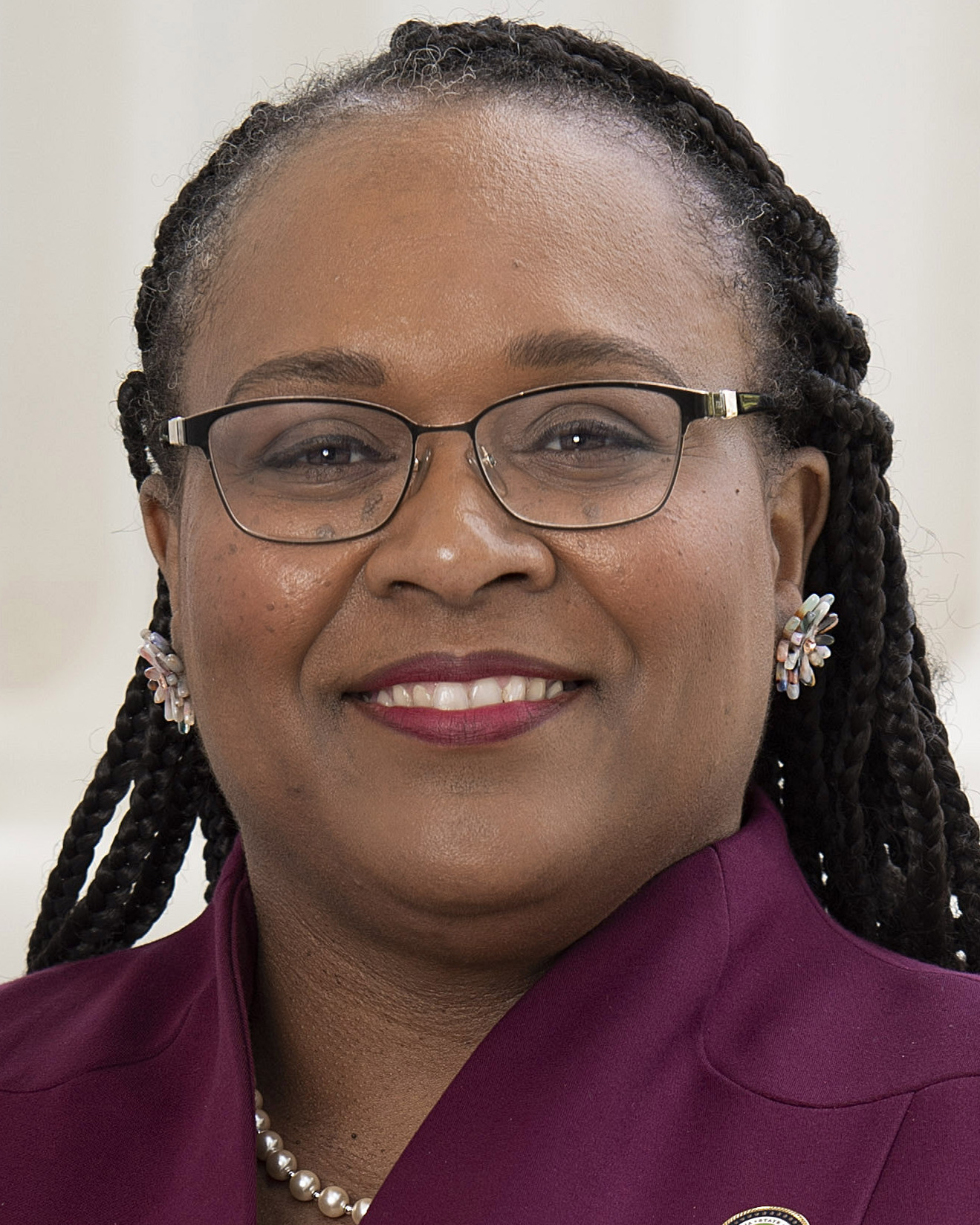

Candidate	Lori Wilson	Dave Ennis
Party	Democratic	Republican
Popular vote	124,283	87,156
Percentage	58.8%	41.2%
State assemblymember before election
Lori Wilson
Democratic
State assemblymember after election
Lori Wilson
Democratic

=== Candidates ===
- Dave Ennis (Republican), civil engineer
- Jeffrey Flack (Democratic), data and policy analyst
- Wanda Wallis (Republican), realtor
- Lori Wilson (Democratic), incumbent state assemblymember

=== Endorsements ===
Lori Wilson (D)

Political parties

- California Democratic Party

Labor unions

- AFSCME California

Newspapers

- The Sacramento Bee

=== Fundraising ===
Campaign finance reports as of January 25, 2024
Candidate	Raised	Spent	Cash on hand
Dave Ennis (R)	$0	$250	$1,281
Jeffrey Flack (D)	–	–	–
Wanda Wallis (R)	$1,351	$5,467	$1,537
Lori Wilson (D)	$35,180	$99,714	$238,396
Source: Secretary of State of California

=== Results ===
2024 California's 11th State Assembly district election
Primary election
Party	Candidate	Votes	%
Democratic	Lori Wilson (incumbent)	50,129	50.2
Republican	Dave Ennis	26,078	26.1
Republican	Wanda Wallis	14,641	14.7
Democratic	Jeffrey Flack	8,988	9.0
Total votes		99,836	100.0
General election
Democratic	Lori Wilson (incumbent)	124,283	58.8
Republican	Dave Ennis	87,156	41.2
Total votes		211,439	100.0
Democratic hold			

== District 12 ==
2024 California's 12th State Assembly district election
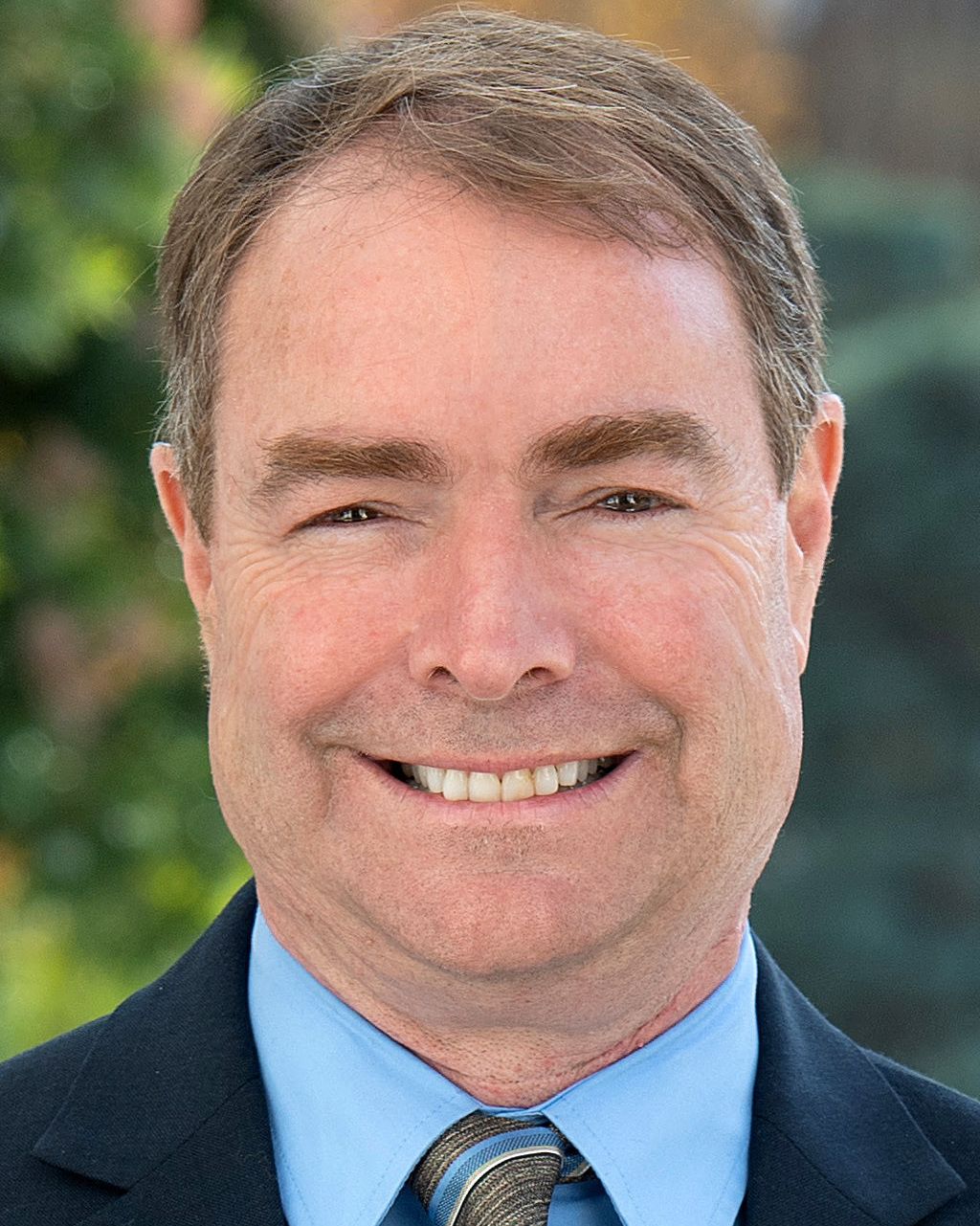

Candidate	Damon Connolly	Andrew Podshadley
Party	Democratic	Republican
Popular vote	184,605	59,286
Percentage	75.7%	24.3%
State assemblymember before election
Damon Connolly
Democratic
State assemblymember after election
Damon Connolly
Democratic

=== Candidates ===
- Eryn Cervantes (Republican), correctional counselor
- Damon Connolly (Democratic), incumbent state assemblymember
- Andrew Podshadley (Republican), wine business owner

=== Endorsements ===
Damon Connolly (D)

Political parties

- California Democratic Party

Labor unions

- AFSCME California

Newspapers

- Marin Independent Journal
Andrew Podshadely (R)

Political parties

- California Republican Party

=== Fundraising ===
Campaign finance reports as of January 25, 2024
Candidate	Raised	Spent	Cash on hand
Eryn Cervantes (R)	–	–	–
Damon Connolly (D)	$20,605	$23,791	$298,379
Andrew Podshadley (R)	$250	$280	$644
Source: Secretary of State of California

=== Results ===
2024 California's 12th State Assembly district election
Primary election
Party	Candidate	Votes	%
Democratic	Damon Connolly (incumbent)	111,490	77.5
Republican	Andrew Podshadley	17,335	12.0
Republican	Eryn Cervantes	15,121	10.5
Total votes		143,946	100.0
General election
Democratic	Damon Connolly (incumbent)	184,605	75.7
Republican	Andrew Podshadley	59,286	24.3
Total votes		243,891	100.0
Democratic hold			

== District 13 ==
2024 California's 13th State Assembly district election
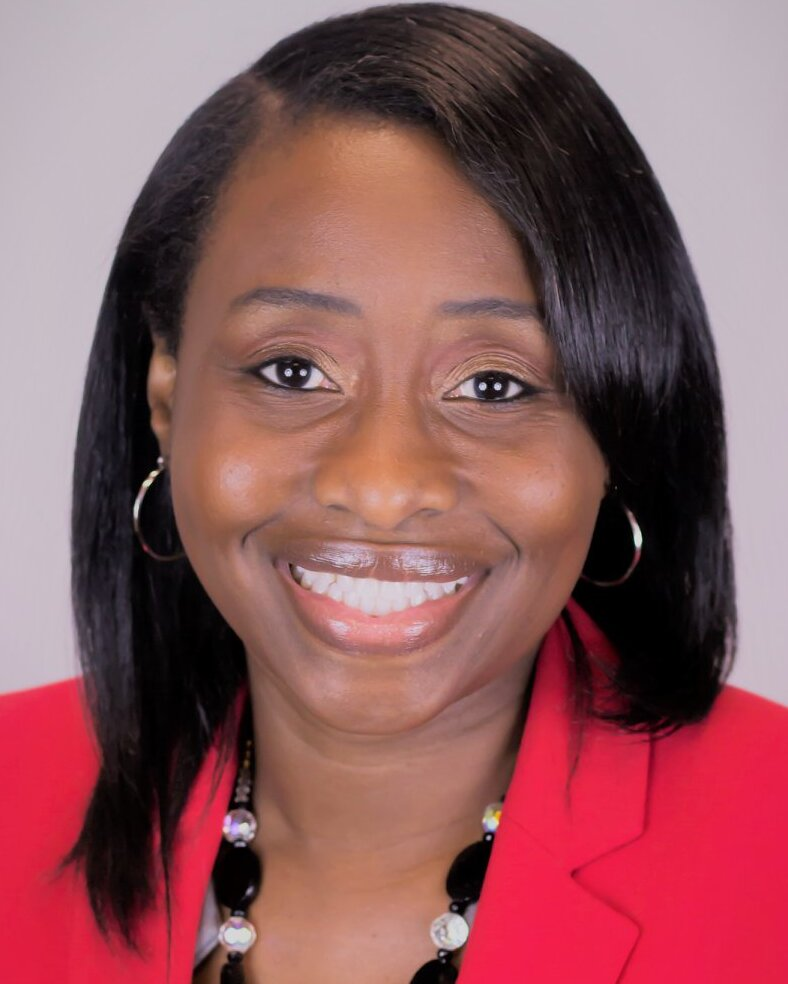

Candidate	Rhodesia Ransom	Denise Aguilar Mendez
Party	Democratic	Republican
Popular vote	78,071	59,237
Percentage	56.9%	43.1%
State assemblymember before election
Carlos Villapudua
Democratic
State assemblymember after election
Rhodesia Ransom
Democratic

=== Candidates ===
- Denise Aguilar Mendez (Republican), nonprofit director
- Rhodesia Ransom (Democratic), former Tracy city councilor
- Edith Villapudua (Democratic), realtor and wife of incumbent Carlos Villapudua

==== Declined ====
- Carlos Villapudua (Democratic), incumbent state assemblymember (ran for state senate)

=== Endorsements ===
Rhodesia Ransom (D)

Labor unions

- California Faculty Association
Declined to endorse

Political parties

- California Democratic Party

=== Fundraising ===
Campaign finance reports as of January 25, 2024
Candidate	Raised	Spent	Cash on hand
Denise Aguilar Mendez (R)	–	–	–
Rhodesia Ransom (D)	$212,839	$55,882	$190,191
Edith Villapudua (D)	$13,200	$90,217	$220,871
Source: Secretary of State of California

=== Results ===
2024 California's 13th State Assembly district election
Primary election
Party	Candidate	Votes	%
Democratic	Rhodesia Ransom	27,255	41.6
Republican	Denise Aguilar Mendez	24,823	37.9
Democratic	Edith Villapudua	13,415	20.5
Total votes		65,493	100.0
General election
Democratic	Rhodesia Ransom	78,071	56.9
Republican	Denise Aguilar Mendez	59,237	43.1
Total votes		137,308	100.0
Democratic hold			

== District 14 ==
2024 California's 14th State Assembly district election
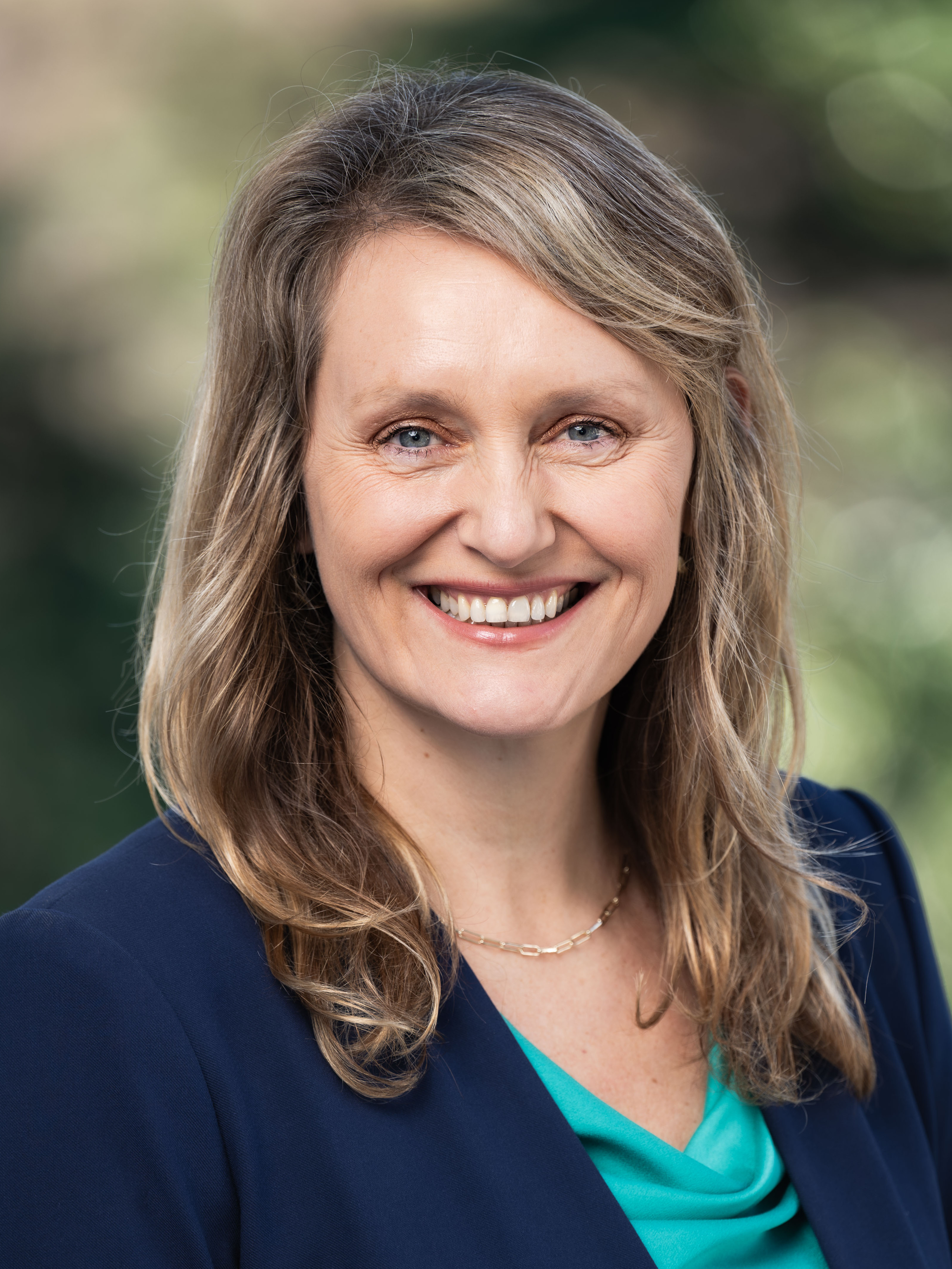

Candidate	Buffy Wicks	Margot Smith
Party	Democratic	Democratic
Popular vote	124,973	57,450
Percentage	68.5%	31.5%
State assemblymember before election
Buffy Wicks
Democratic
State assemblymember after election
Buffy Wicks
Democratic

=== Candidates ===
- Utkarsh Jain (Republican), college student
- Margot Smith (Democratic), retired social scientist
- Buffy Wicks (Democratic), incumbent state assemblymember

=== Endorsements ===
Buffy Wicks (D)

Political parties

- California Democratic Party

Labor unions

- AFSCME California

=== Fundraising ===
Campaign finance reports as of January 25, 2024
Candidate	Raised	Spent	Cash on hand
Utkarsh Jain (R)	$0	$20	$36
Margot Smith (D)	–	–	–
Buffy Wicks (D)	$24,010	$25,717	$382,135
Source: Secretary of State of California

=== Results ===
2024 California's 14th State Assembly district election
Primary election
Party	Candidate	Votes	%
Democratic	Buffy Wicks (incumbent)	78,750	73.5
Democratic	Margot Smith	18,272	17.1
Republican	Utkarsh Jain	10,075	9.4
Total votes		107,097	100.0
General election
Democratic	Buffy Wicks (incumbent)	124,973	68.5
Democratic	Margot Smith	57,450	31.5
Total votes		182,423	100.0
Democratic hold			

== District 15 ==
2024 California's 15th State Assembly district election
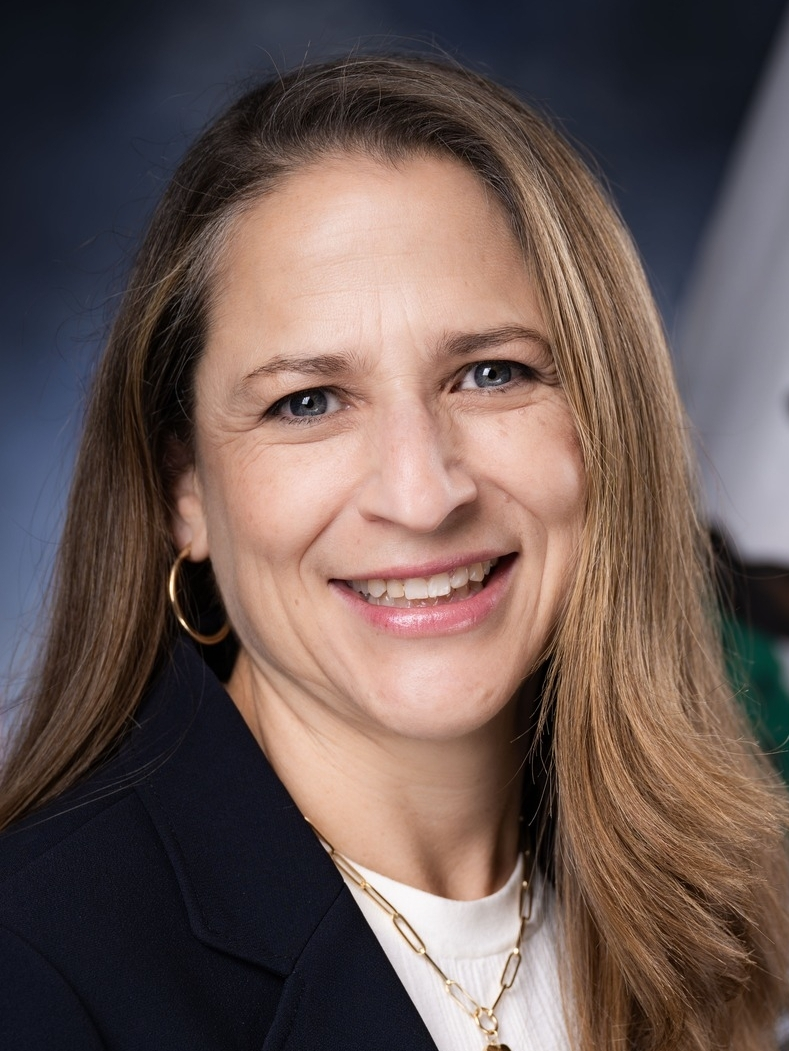

Candidate	Anamarie Avila Farias	Sonia Ledo
Party	Democratic	Republican
Popular vote	131,850	73,762
Percentage	64.1%	35.9%
State assemblymember before election
Tim Grayson
Democratic
State assemblymember after election
Anamarie Avila Farias
Democratic

=== Candidates ===
- Anamarie Avila Farias (Democratic), Contra Costa County School Board member
- Sonia Ledo (Republican), realtor
- Karen Mitchoff (Democratic), former Contra Costa County supervisor
- Monica Wilson (Democratic), Antioch city councilor

==== Declined ====
- Tim Grayson (Democratic), incumbent state assemblymember (ran for state senate)

=== Endorsements ===
Monica Wilson (D)

State officials

- Sally Lieber, member of the California State Board of Equalization for the 2nd district

Individuals

- Christine Pelosi, human rights advocate and daughter of Nancy Pelosi

Political parties

- California Democratic Party
- California Working Families Party

Organizations

- Courage California

Labor unions

- AFSCME California
- California Faculty Association

=== Fundraising ===
Campaign finance reports as of January 25, 2024
Candidate	Raised	Spent	Cash on hand
Anamarie Avila Farias (D)	–	–	–
Sonia Ledo (R)	$700	$6,425	$1,493
Karen Mitchoff (D)	$1,449	$6,204	$39,237
Monica Wilson (D)	$52,542	$33,162	$115,283
Source: Secretary of State of California

=== Results ===
2024 California's 15th State Assembly district election
Primary election
Party	Candidate	Votes	%
Republican	Sonia Ledo	30,962	31.9
Democratic	Anamarie Avila Farias	29,525	30.4
Democratic	Monica Wilson	24,792	25.5
Democratic	Karen Mitchoff	11,917	12.3
Total votes		97,196	100.0
General election
Democratic	Anamarie Avila Farias	131,850	64.1
Republican	Sonia Ledo	73,762	35.9
Total votes		205,612	100.0
Democratic hold			

== District 16 ==
2024 California's 16th State Assembly district election
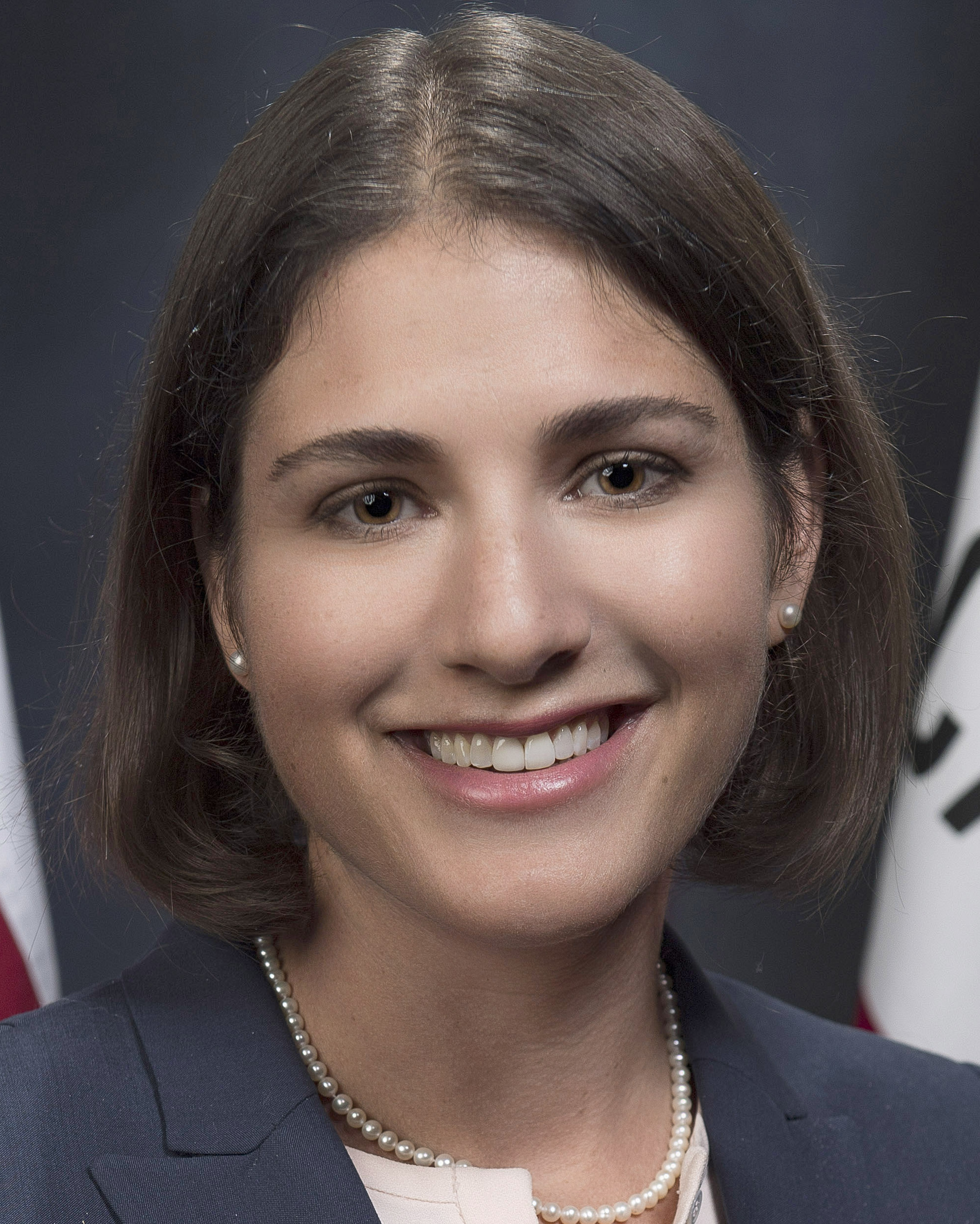

Candidate	Rebecca Bauer-Kahan	Joseph Rubay
Party	Democratic	Republican
Popular vote	161,029	90,136
Percentage	64.1%	35.9%
State assemblymember before election
Rebecca Bauer-Kahan
Democratic
State assemblymember after election
Rebecca Bauer-Kahan
Democratic

=== Candidates ===
- Rebecca Bauer-Kahan (Democratic), incumbent state assemblymember
- Joseph Rubay (Republican), business principal and perennial candidate

=== Endorsements ===
Rebecca Bauer-Kahan (D)

Political parties

- California Democratic Party

Labor unions

- AFSCME California

Organizations

- California Environmental Voters

=== Results ===
2024 California's 16th State Assembly district election
Primary election
Party	Candidate	Votes	%
Democratic	Rebecca Bauer-Kahan (incumbent)	84,290	65.5
Republican	Joseph Rubay	44,351	34.5
Total votes		128,641	100.0
General election
Democratic	Rebecca Bauer-Kahan (incumbent)	161,029	64.1
Republican	Joseph Rubay	90,136	35.9
Total votes		251,165	100.0
Democratic hold			

== District 17 ==
2024 California's 17th State Assembly district election
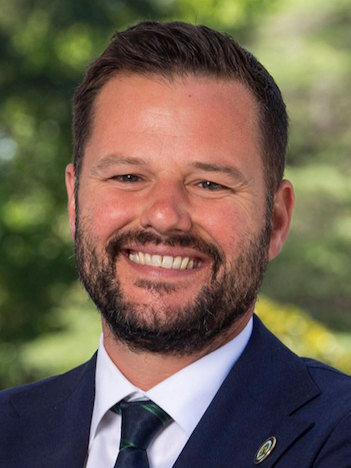

Candidate	Matt Haney	Manuel Norris Barrera
Party	Democratic	Republican
Popular vote	169,438	30,887
Percentage	84.6%	15.4%
State assemblymember before election
Matt Haney
Democratic
State assemblymember after election
Matt Haney
Democratic

=== Candidates ===
- Otto Duke (Democratic), cancer research nonprofit CEO
- Matt Haney (Democratic), incumbent state assemblymember
- Manuel Noris-Barrera (Republican), realtor

=== Endorsements ===
Matt Haney (D)

Political parties

- California Democratic Party

Labor unions

- AFSCME California
Manuel Norris-Barrera (R)

Political parties

- California Republican Party

=== Results ===
2024 California's 17th State Assembly district election
Primary election
Party	Candidate	Votes	%
Democratic	Matt Haney (incumbent)	90,915	81.9
Republican	Manuel Noris-Barrera	13,843	12.5
Democratic	Otto Duke	6,245	5.6
Total votes		111,003	100.0
General election
Democratic	Matt Haney (incumbent)	169,490	84.6
Republican	Manuel Noris-Barrera	30,900	15.4
Total votes		200,390	100.0
Democratic hold			

== District 18 ==
2024 California's 18th State Assembly district election
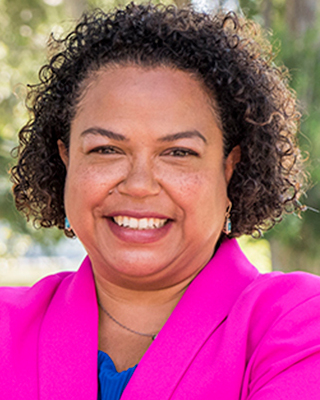

Candidate	Mia Bonta	Andre Sandford
Party	Democratic	American Independent
Popular vote	134,073	32,983
Percentage	80.3%	19.7%
State assemblymember before election
Mia Bonta
Democratic
State assemblymember after election
Mia Bonta
Democratic

=== Candidates ===
- Mia Bonta (Democratic), incumbent state assemblymember
- Cheyenne Kenney (Republican), college student
- Mindy Pechenuk (Republican), economist and runner-up for this district in 2022
- Andre Sandford (American Independent), housing program manager

=== Endorsements ===
Mia Bonta (D)

Political parties

- California Democratic Party

Labor unions

- AFSCME California

=== Results ===
2024 California's 18th State Assembly district election
Primary election
Party	Candidate	Votes	%
Democratic	Mia Bonta (incumbent)	73,155	84.9
American Independent	Andre Sandford	4,582	5.3
Republican	Mindy Pechenuk	4,397	5.1
Republican	Cheyenne Kenney	4,012	4.7
Total votes		86,146	100.0
General election
Democratic	Mia Bonta (incumbent)	134,073	80.3
American Independent	Andre Sandford	32,983	19.7
Total votes		167,056	100.0
Democratic hold			

== District 19 ==
2024 California's 19th State Assembly district election
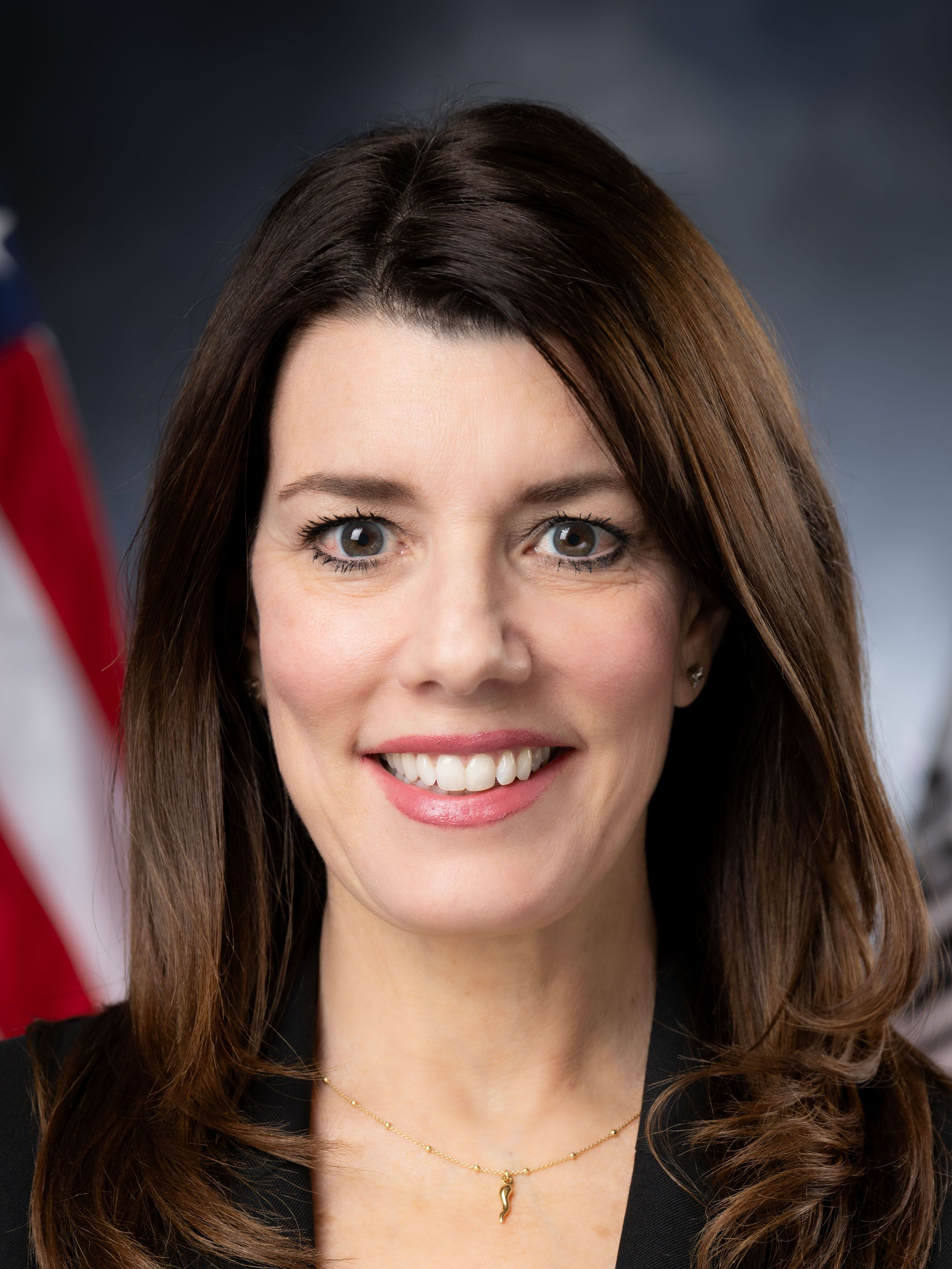

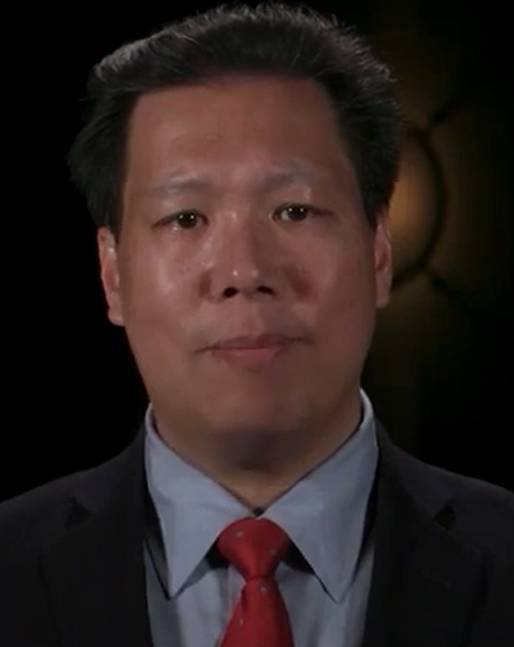
Candidate	Catherine Stefani	David Lee
Party	Democratic	Democratic
Popular vote	118,888	77,518
Percentage	60.5%	39.5%
State assemblymember before election
Phil Ting
Democratic
State assemblymember after election
Catherine Stefani
Democratic

The incumbent was Democrat Phil Ting, who was term-limited.

=== Candidates ===
==== Declared ====
- Nadia Flamenco (Republican), filmmaker
- David Lee (Democratic), educator
- Arjun Sodhani (Republican), inventory manager
- Catherine Stefani (Democratic), San Francisco supervisor

=== Endorsements ===
David Lee (D)

State senators

- Quentin Kopp, SD-08 (1986–1998)

State assemblymembers

- Anthony Rendon, AD-62 (2012–present) and former Speaker of the California State Assembly (2016–2023)
- Phil Ting, AD-19 (2012–present)

Municipal officials

- Connie Chan, San Francisco supervisor from District 1 (2021–present)
- Sandra Lee Fewer, former San Francisco supervisor from District 1 (2017–2021)
- Norman Yee, former San Francisco supervisor from District 7 (2013–2021)

Labor unions

- California Faculty Association
Catherine Stefani (D)

Political parties

- California Democratic Party

Newspapers

- Bay Area Reporter
- San Francisco Chronicle

=== Results ===
2024 California's 19th State Assembly district election
Primary election
Party	Candidate	Votes	%
Democratic	Catherine Stefani	64,973	57.0
Democratic	David Lee	33,047	29.0
Republican	Nadia Flamenco	8,337	7.3
Republican	Arjun Sodhani	7,632	6.7
Total votes		113,989	100.0
General election
Democratic	Catherine Stefani	118,928	60.5
Democratic	David Lee	77,546	39.5
Total votes		196,474	100.0
Democratic hold			

== District 20 ==
2024 California's 20th State Assembly district election
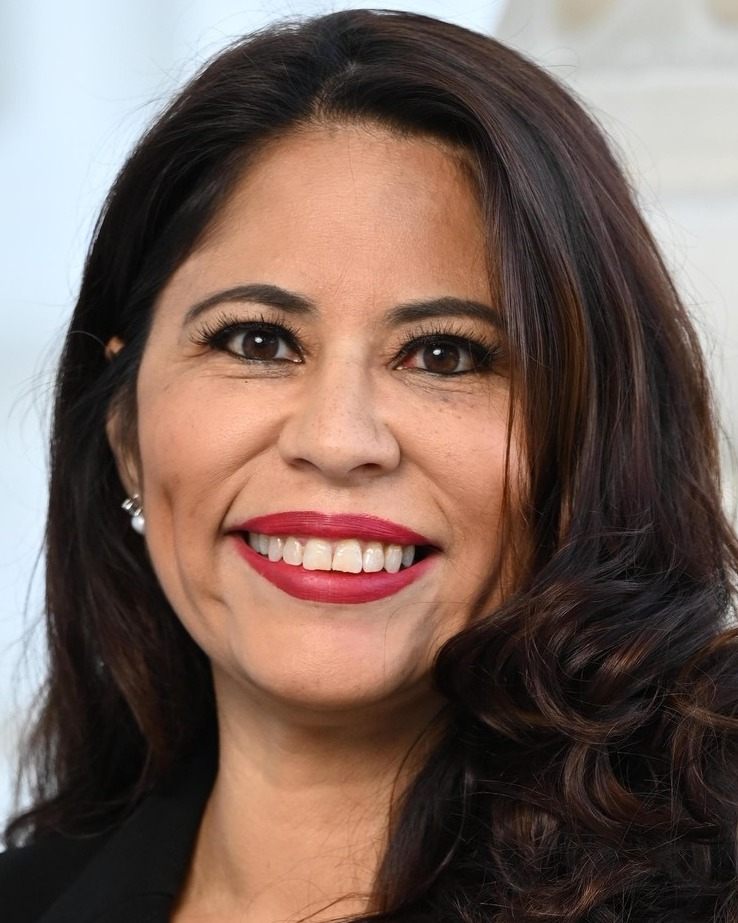

Candidate	Liz Ortega	Sangeetha Shanbhogue
Party	Democratic	Republican
Popular vote	126,615	47,060
Percentage	72.9%	27.1%
State assemblymember before election
Liz Ortega
Democratic
State assemblymember after election
Liz Ortega
Democratic

=== Candidates ===
- Liz Ortega (Democratic), incumbent state assemblymember
- Sangeetha Shanbhogue (Republican) (write-in)

=== Endorsements ===
Liz Ortega (D)

Political parties

- California Democratic Party
- California Working Families Party

Labor unions

- AFSCME California

=== Results ===
2024 California's 20th State Assembly district election
Primary election
Party	Candidate	Votes	%
Democratic	Liz Ortega (incumbent)	57,083	99.3
Republican	Sangeetha Shanbhogue (write-in)	284	0.5
Republican	Joseph Grcar (write-in)	116	0.2
Total votes		57,483	100.0
General election
Democratic	Liz Ortega (incumbent)	126,615	72.9
Republican	Sangeetha Shanbhogue	47,060	27.1
Total votes		173,675	100.0
Democratic hold			

== District 21 ==
2024 California's 21st State Assembly district election
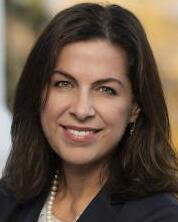

Candidate	Diane Papan	Mark Gilham
Party	Democratic	Republican
Popular vote	147,291	52,218
Percentage	73.8%	26.2%
State assemblymember before election
Diane Papan
Democratic
State assemblymember after election
Diane Papan
Democratic

=== Candidates ===
- Mark Gilham (Republican), business owner and U.S. Marine Corps veteran
- Diane Papan (Democratic), incumbent state assemblymember

=== Endorsements ===
Diane Papan (D)

Political parties

- California Democratic Party

Labor unions

- AFSCME California

=== Results ===
2024 California's 21st State Assembly district election
Primary election
Party	Candidate	Votes	%
Democratic	Diane Papan (incumbent)	77,204	75.3
Republican	Mark Gilham	25,358	24.7
Total votes		102,562	100.0
General election
Democratic	Diane Papan (incumbent)	147,291	73.8
Republican	Mark Gilham	52,218	26.2
Total votes		199,509	100.0
Democratic hold			

== District 22 ==
2024 California's 22nd State Assembly district election
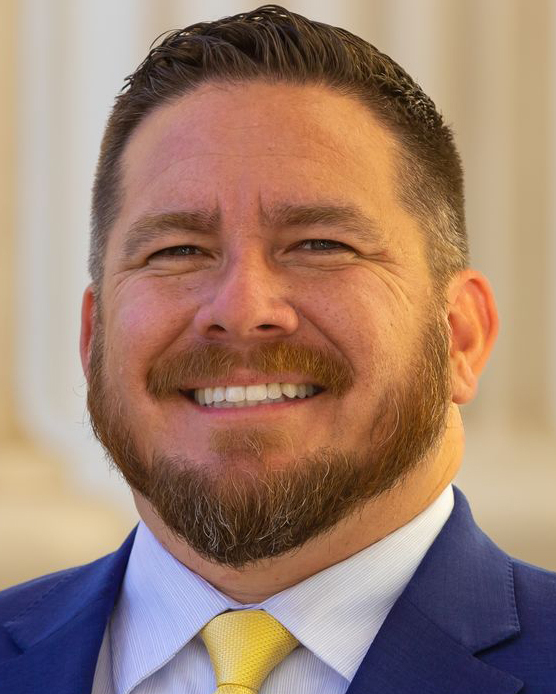

Candidate	Juan Alanis	Jessica Self
Party	Republican	Democratic
Popular vote	86,858	67,743
Percentage	56.2%	43.8%
State assemblymember before election
Juan Alanis
Republican
State assemblymember after election
Juan Alanis
Republican

=== Candidates ===
- Juan Alanis (Republican), incumbent state assemblymember
- Jessica Self (Democratic), attorney and runner-up for this district in 2022

=== Endorsements ===
Juan Alanis (R)

Labor unions

- California Professional Firefighters

Political parties

- California Republican Party
Jessica Self (D)

Political parties

- California Democratic Party

Labor unions

- California Faculty Association

=== Results ===
2024 California's 22nd State Assembly district election
Primary election
Party	Candidate	Votes	%
Republican	Juan Alanis (incumbent)	35,392	57.6
Democratic	Jessica Self	26,015	42.4
Total votes		61,407	100.0
General election
Republican	Juan Alanis (incumbent)	86,858	56.2
Democratic	Jessica Self	67,743	43.8
Total votes		154,601	100.0
Republican hold			

== District 23 ==
2024 California's 23rd State Assembly district election
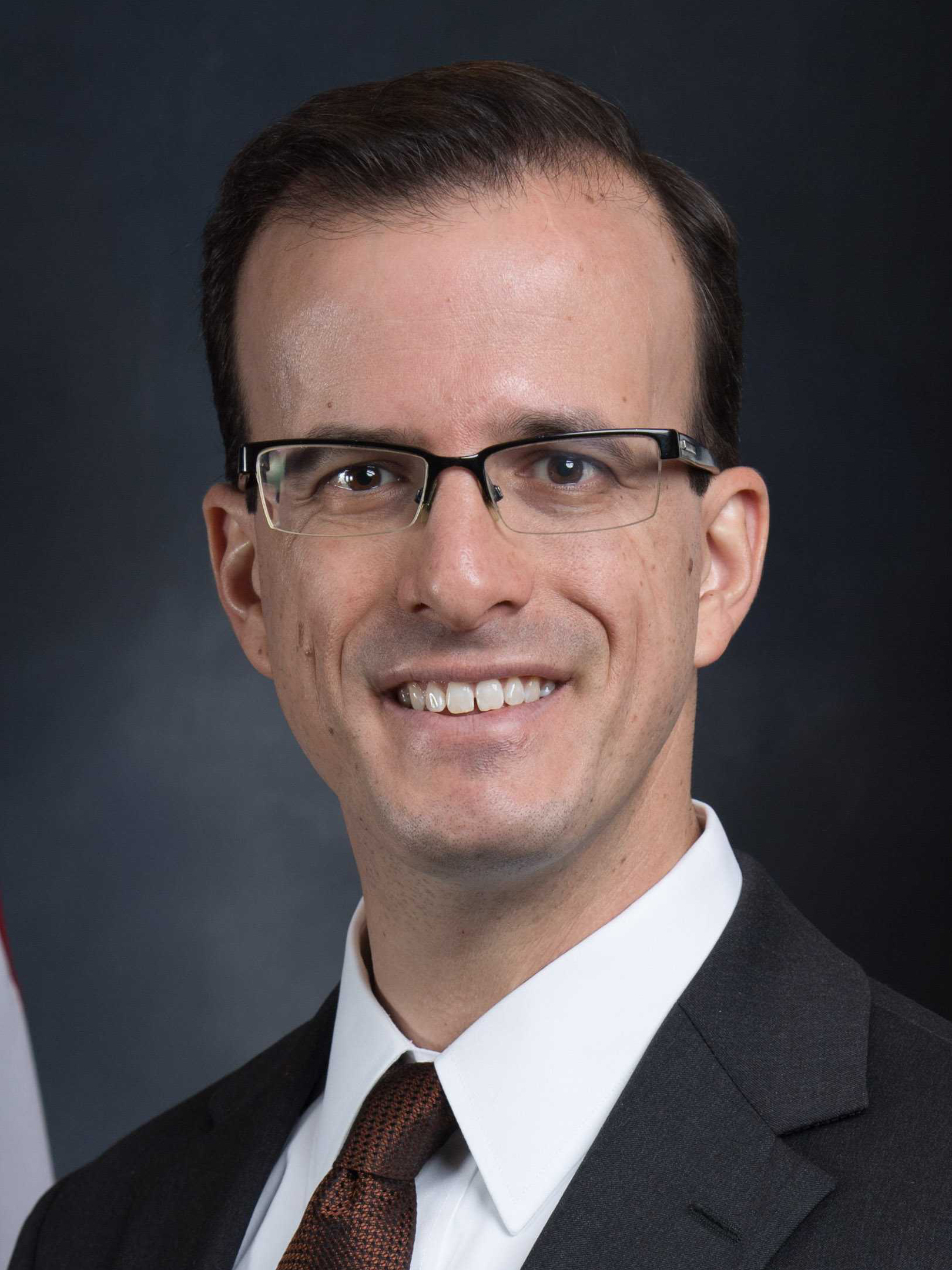

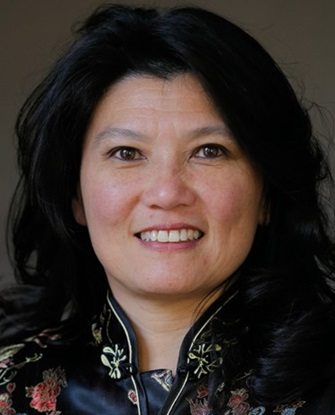
Candidate	Marc Berman	Lydia Kou
Party	Democratic	Democratic
Popular vote	115,833	77,949
Percentage	59.8%	40.2%
State assemblymember before election
Marc Berman
Democratic
State assemblymember after election
Marc Berman
Democratic

=== Candidates ===
- Marc Berman (Democratic), incumbent state assemblymember
- Lydia Kou (Democratic), mayor of Palo Alto
- Allan Marson (Republican), attorney
- Gus Mattamal (Republican), math teacher and candidate for California's 15th congressional district in 2022

=== Endorsements ===
Marc Berman (D)

Political parties

- California Democratic Party

Labor unions

- AFSCME California
Gus Mattamal (R)

Political parties

- California Republican Party

=== Results ===
2024 California's 23rd State Assembly district election
Primary election
Party	Candidate	Votes	%
Democratic	Marc Berman (incumbent)	67,177	57.4
Democratic	Lydia Kou	23,723	20.3
Republican	Gus Mattamal	13,290	11.4
Republican	Allan Marson	12,900	11.0
Total votes		117,090	100.0
General election
Democratic	Marc Berman (incumbent)	115,833	59.8
Democratic	Lydia Kou	77,949	40.2
Total votes		193,782	100.0
Democratic hold			

== District 24 ==
2024 California's 24th State Assembly district election
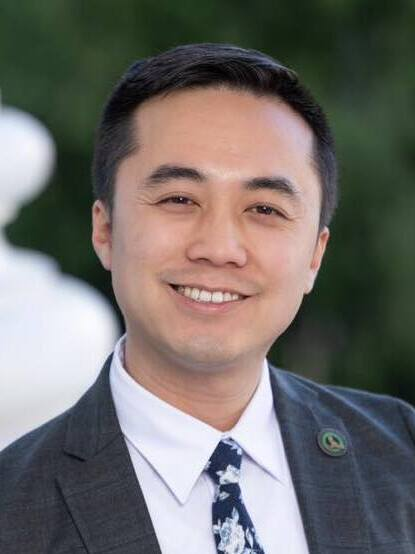

Candidate	Alex Lee	Bob Brunton
Party	Democratic	Republican
Popular vote	105,150	53,936
Percentage	66.1%	33.9%
State assemblymember before election
Alex Lee
Democratic
State assemblymember after election
Alex Lee
Democratic

=== Candidates ===
- Bob Brunton (Republican), Ohlone College trustee and runner-up for this district in 2022
- Alex Lee (Democratic), incumbent state assemblymember
- Marti Souza (Republican), pastor

=== Endorsements ===
Bob Brunton (R)

Political parties

- California Republican Party
Alex Lee (D)

Political parties

- California Democratic Party
- California Working Families Party

Labor unions

- AFSCME California

=== Results ===
2024 California's 24th State Assembly district election
Primary election
Party	Candidate	Votes	%
Democratic	Alex Lee (incumbent)	45,605	68.3
Republican	Bob Brunton	14,975	22.4
Republican	Marti Souza	6,156	9.2
Total votes		66,736	100.0
General election
Democratic	Alex Lee (incumbent)	105,150	66.1
Republican	Bob Brunton	53,936	33.9
Total votes		159,086	100.0
Democratic hold			

== District 25 ==
2024 California's 25th State Assembly district election
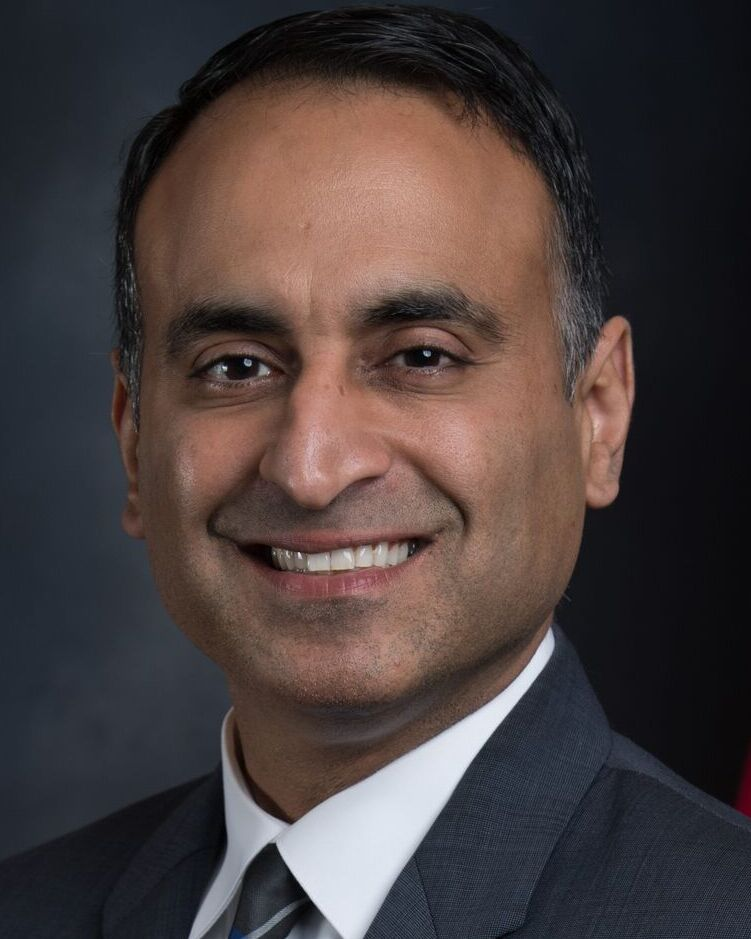

Candidate	Ash Kalra	Ted Stroll
Party	Democratic	Republican
Popular vote	107,968	49,861
Percentage	68.4%	31.6%
State assemblymember before election
Ash Kalra
Democratic
State assemblymember after election
Ash Kalra
Democratic

=== Candidates ===
- Ash Kalra (Democratic), incumbent state assemblymember
- Lan Ngo (Democratic), senior healthcare territory manager
- Ted Stroll (Republican), retired attorney and runner-up for this district in 2022

=== Endorsements ===
Ash Kalra (D)

Political parties

- California Democratic Party
- California Working Families Party

Labor unions

- AFSCME California
Ted Stroll (R)

Political parties

- California Republican Party

=== Results ===
2024 California's 25th State Assembly district election
Primary election
Party	Candidate	Votes	%
Democratic	Ash Kalra (incumbent)	35,840	51.5
Republican	Ted Stroll	18,276	26.2
Democratic	Lan Ngo	15,510	22.3
Total votes		69,626	100.0
General election
Democratic	Ash Kalra (incumbent)	107,968	68.4
Republican	Ted Stroll	49,861	31.6
Total votes		157,829	100.0
Democratic hold			

== District 26 ==
2024 California's 26th State Assembly district election
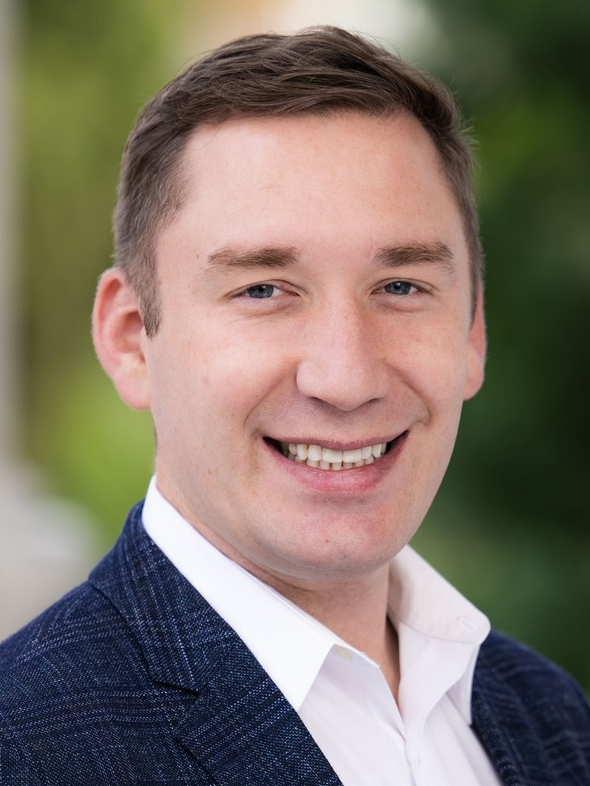

Candidate	Patrick Ahrens	Tara Sreekrishnan
Party	Democratic	Democratic
Popular vote	76,807	60,392
Percentage	56.0%	44.0%
State assemblymember before election
Evan Low
Democratic
State assemblymember after election
Patrick Ahrens
Democratic

=== Candidates ===
==== Declared ====
- Patrick Ahrens (Democratic), district director for incumbent assemblymember Evan Low
- Omar Din (Democratic), Sunnyvale city councilor
- Ashish Garg (no party preference), digital communications entrepreneur
- Bob Goodwyn (Libertarian), retired pilot
- Sophie Yan Song (Republican), certified public accountant
- Tara Sreekrishnan (Democratic), Santa Clara County School Board member

==== Declined ====
- Evan Low (Democratic), incumbent state assemblymember (endorsed Ahrens, running for U.S. House)

=== Endorsements ===
Patrick Ahrens (D)

Federal officials

- Mike Honda, former U.S. representative

State legislators

- Evan Low, state assemblymember for this district
- Gail Pellerin, state assemblymember

County officials

- Cindy Chavez, Santa Clara County Supervisor
Tara Sreekrishnan (D)

State legislators

- Dave Cortese, state senator
- Melissa Hurtado, state senator
- Nancy Skinner, state senator

=== Results ===
2024 California's 26th State Assembly district election
Primary election
Party	Candidate	Votes	%
Democratic	Patrick Ahrens	25,057	34.4
Democratic	Tara Sreekrishnan	19,617	26.9
Republican	Sophie Yan Song	15,965	21.9
Democratic	Omar Din	8,779	12.1
Libertarian	Bob Goodwyn	2,172	3.0
No party preference	Ashish Garg	1,221	1.7
Total votes		72,811	100.0
General election
Democratic	Patrick Ahrens	76,807	56.0
Democratic	Tara Sreekrishnan	60,392	44.0
Total votes		137,199	100.0
Democratic hold			

== District 27 ==
2024 California's 27th State Assembly district election
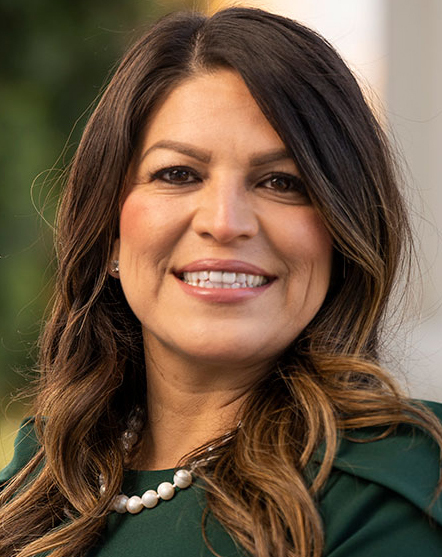

Candidate	Esmeralda Soria	Joanna Garcia Rose
Party	Democratic	Republican
Popular vote	75,559	64,576
Percentage	53.9%	46.1%
State assemblymember before election
Esmeralda Soria
Democratic
State assemblymember after election
Esmeralda Soria
Democratic

=== Candidates ===
- Joanna Garcia Rose (Republican), auditor
- Esmeralda Soria (Democratic), incumbent state assemblywoman

=== Endorsements ===
Esmeralda Soria (D)

Political parties

- California Democratic Party

Labor unions

- AFSCME California

=== Fundraising ===
Campaign finance reports as of October 19, 2024
Candidate	Raised	Spent	Cash on hand
Esmeralda Soria (D)	$2,555,505	$3,581,352	$270,002
Joanna Rose (R)	$907,818	$773,787	$164,505
Source: Secretary of State of California

=== Results ===
2024 California's 27th State Assembly district election
Primary election
Party	Candidate	Votes	%
Republican	Joanna Garcia Rose	29,457	50.9
Democratic	Esmeralda Soria (incumbent)	28,402	49.1
Total votes		57,859	100.0
General election
Democratic	Esmeralda Soria (incumbent)	75,559	53.9
Republican	Joanna Garcia Rose	64,576	46.1
Total votes		140,135	100.0
Democratic hold			

== District 28 ==
2024 California's 28th State Assembly district election
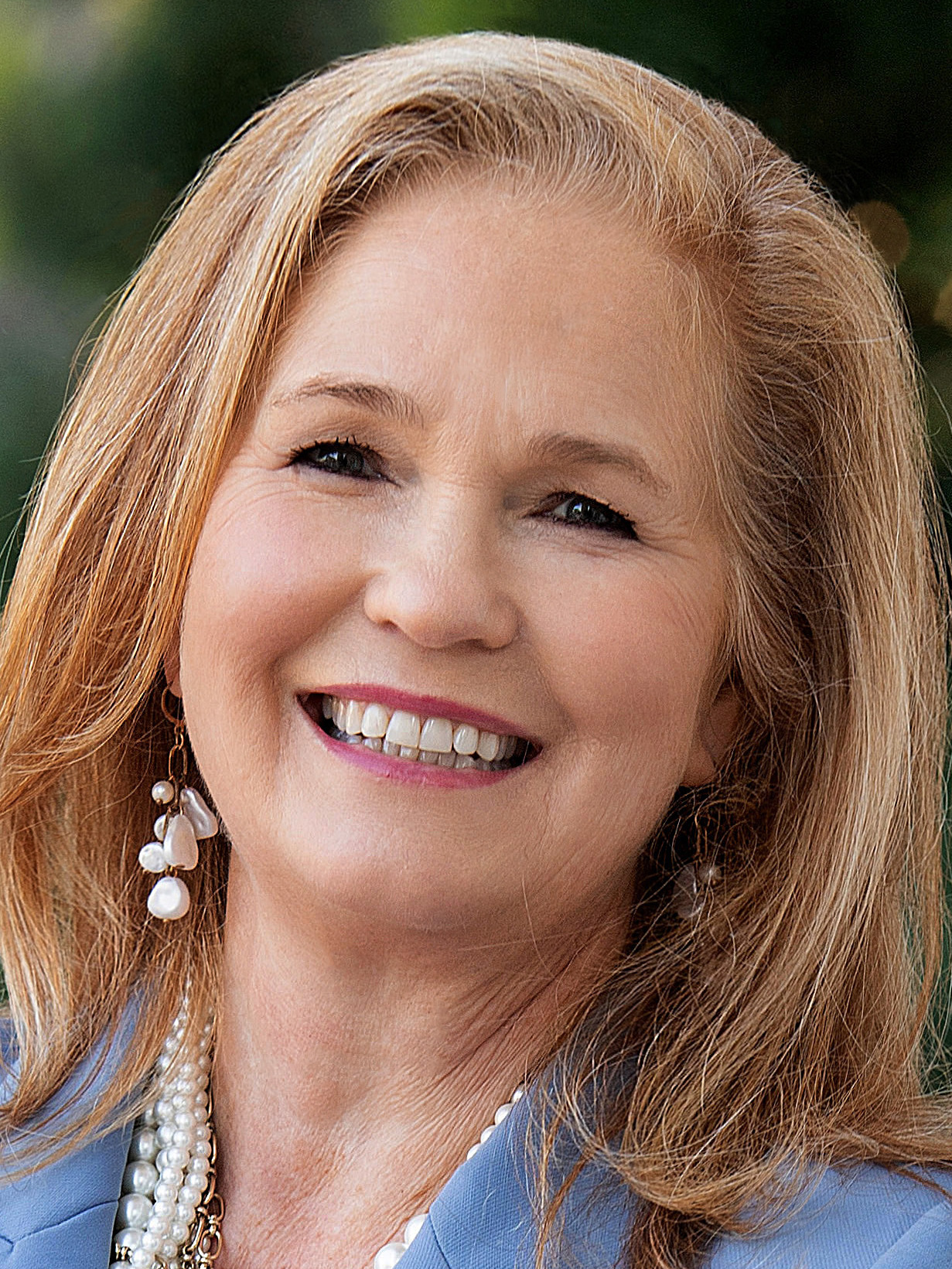

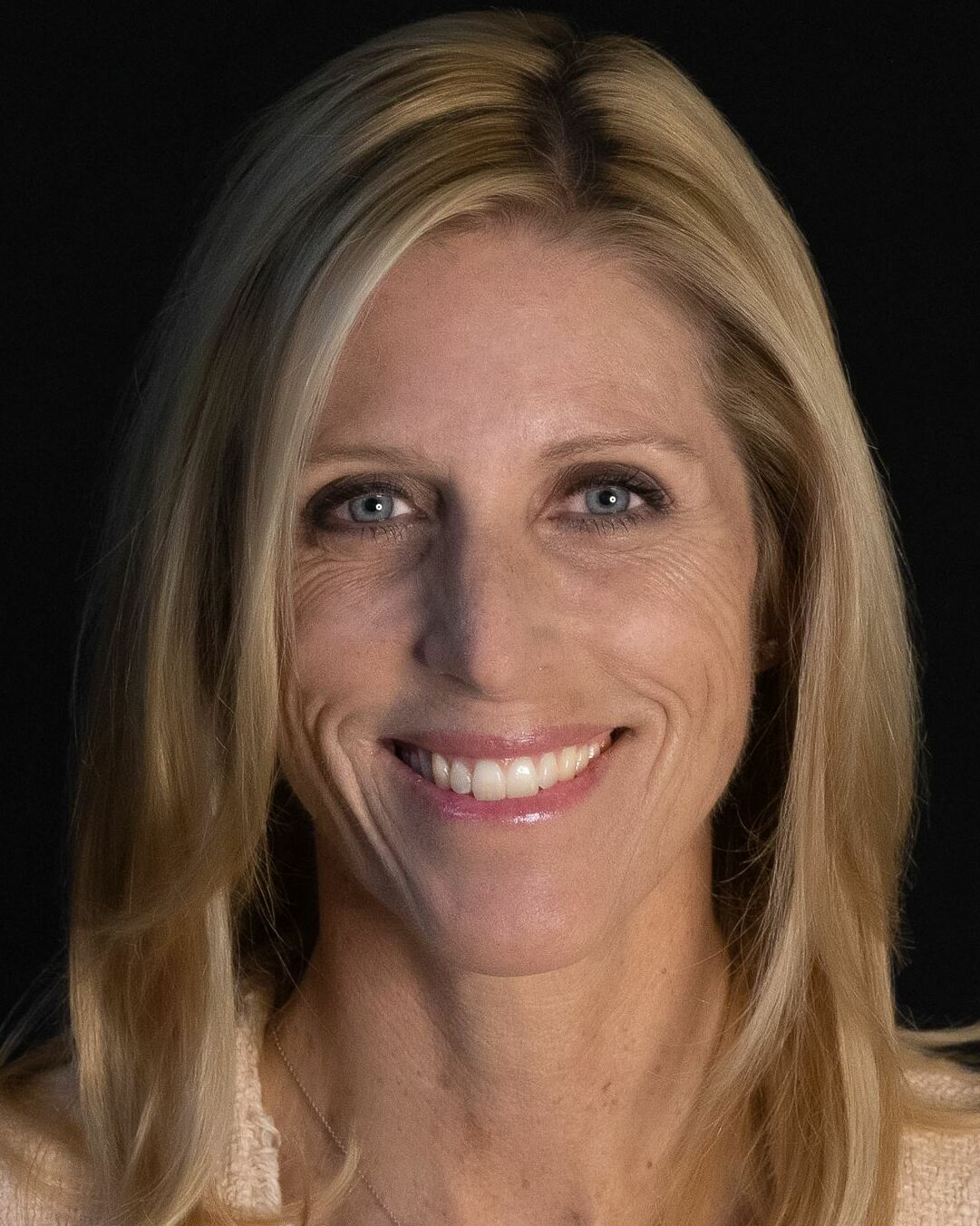
Candidate	Gail Pellerin	Liz Lawler
Party	Democratic	Republican
Popular vote	151,419	75,069
Percentage	66.9%	33.1%
State assemblymember before election
Gail Pellerin
Democratic
State assemblymember after election
Gail Pellerin
Democratic

=== Candidates ===
- Liz Lawler (Republican), Monte Sereno city councilor and runner-up for this district in 2022
- Gail Pellerin (Democratic), incumbent state assemblymember

=== Endorsements ===
Liz Lawler (R)

Political parties

- California Republican Party
Gail Pellerin (D)

Political parties

- California Democratic Party

Labor unions

- AFSCME California

=== Results ===
2024 California's 28th State Assembly district election
Primary election
Party	Candidate	Votes	%
Democratic	Gail Pellerin (incumbent)	85,600	69.2
Republican	Liz Lawler	38,166	30.8
Total votes		123,766	100.0
General election
Democratic	Gail Pellerin (incumbent)	151,419	66.9
Republican	Liz Lawler	75,069	33.1
Total votes		226,488	100.0
Democratic hold			

== District 29 ==
2024 California's 29th State Assembly district election
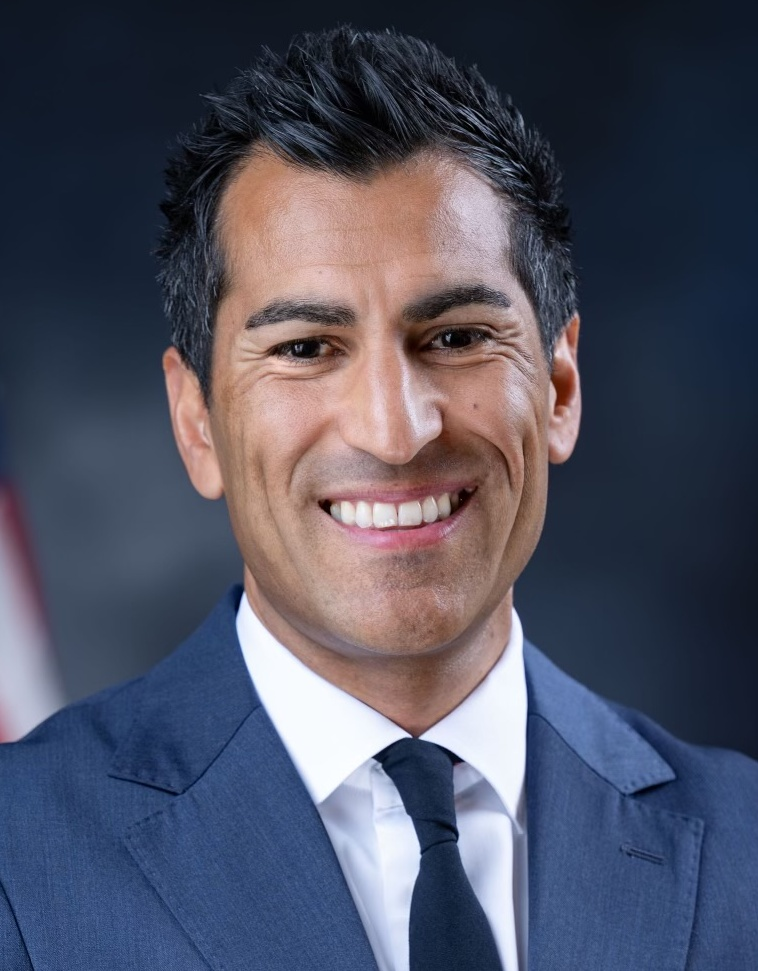

Candidate	Robert Rivas	J.W. Paine
Party	Democratic	Republican
Popular vote	99,600	51,291
Percentage	66.0%	34.0%
State assemblymember before election
Robert Rivas
Democratic
State assemblymember after election
TBD

=== Candidates ===
- James "J.W." Paine (Republican), truck driver
- Robert Rivas (Democratic), incumbent state assemblymember and speaker of the California State Assembly

=== Endorsements ===
Robert Rivas (D)

Political parties

- California Democratic Party

Labor unions

- AFSCME California

=== Results ===
2024 California's 29th State Assembly district election
Primary election
Party	Candidate	Votes	%
Democratic	Robert Rivas (incumbent)	40,756	64.8
Republican	J.W. Paine	22,145	35.2
Total votes		62,901	100.0
General election
Democratic	Robert Rivas (incumbent)	99,600	66.0
Republican	J.W. Paine	51,291	34.0
Total votes		150,891	100.0
Democratic hold			

== District 30 ==
2024 California's 30th State Assembly district election
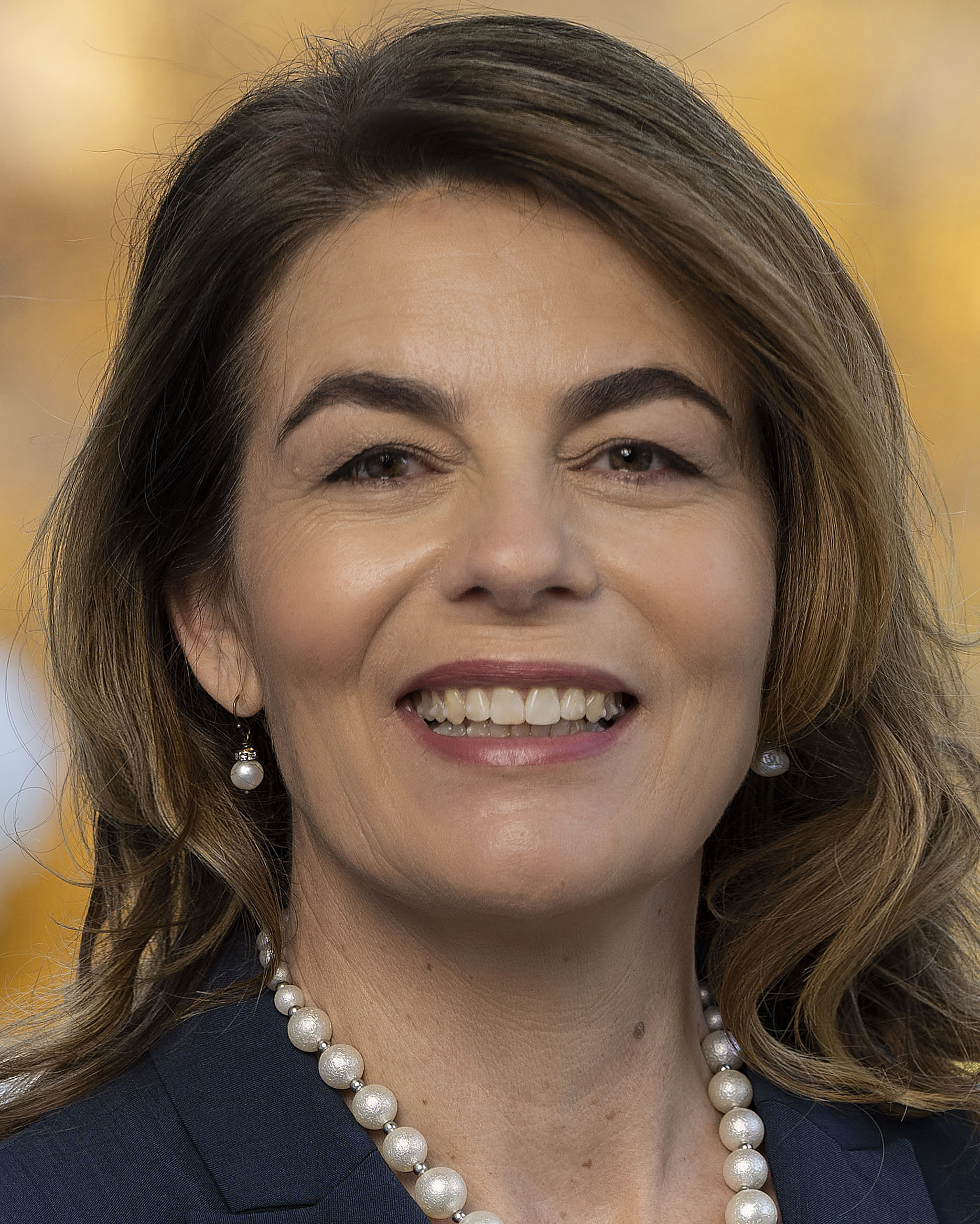

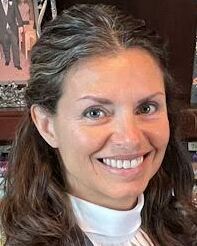
Candidate	Dawn Addis	Dalila Epperson
Party	Democratic	Republican
Popular vote	148,758	89,570
Percentage	62.4%	37.6%
State assemblymember before election
Dawn Addis
Democratic
State assemblymember after election
Dawn Addis
Democratic

=== Candidates ===
- Dawn Addis (Democratic), incumbent state assemblymember
- Dalila Epperson (Republican), community organizer and candidate for California's 19th congressional district in 2022

=== Endorsements ===
Dawn Addis (D)

Political parties

- California Democratic Party

Labor unions

- AFSCME California
Dalila Epperson (R)

Political parties

- California Republican Party

=== Results ===
2024 California's 30th State Assembly district election
Primary election
Party	Candidate	Votes	%
Democratic	Dawn Addis (incumbent)	88,090	62.9
Republican	Dalila Epperson	52,036	37.1
Total votes		140,126	100.0
General election
Democratic	Dawn Addis (incumbent)	148,758	62.4
Republican	Dalila Epperson	89,570	37.6
Total votes		238,328	100.0
Democratic hold			

== District 31 ==
2024 California's 31st State Assembly district election
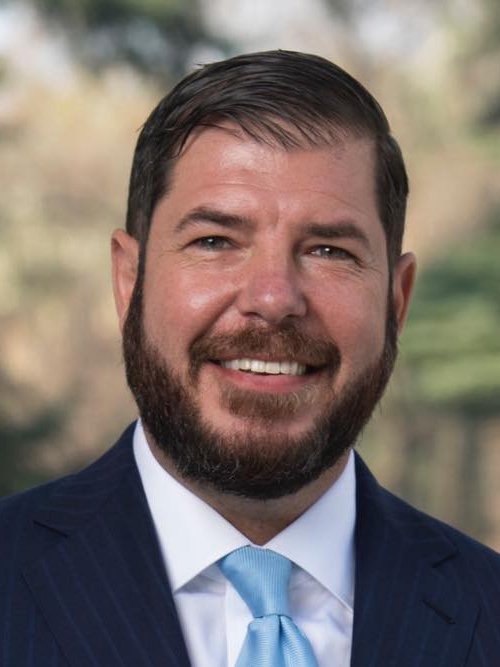

Candidate	Joaquin Arambula	Solomon Verduzco
Party	Democratic	Republican
Popular vote	69,767	46,120
Percentage	60.2%	39.8%
State assemblymember before election
Joaquin Arambula
Democratic
State assemblymember after election
Joaquin Arambula
Democratic

=== Candidates ===
- Joaquin Arambula (Democratic), incumbent state assemblymember
- Solomon Verduzco (Republican), student

=== Endorsements ===
Joaquin Arambula (D)

Political parties

- California Democratic Party

Labor unions

- AFSCME California

=== Results ===
2024 California's 31st State Assembly district election
Primary election
Party	Candidate	Votes	%
Democratic	Joaquin Arambula (incumbent)	28,819	60.0
Republican	Solomon Verduzco	19,240	40.0
Total votes		48,059	100.0
General election
Democratic	Joaquin Arambula (incumbent)	69,767	60.2
Republican	Solomon Verduzco	46,120	39.8
Total votes		115,887	100.0
Democratic hold			

== District 32 ==
2024 California's 32nd State Assembly district election
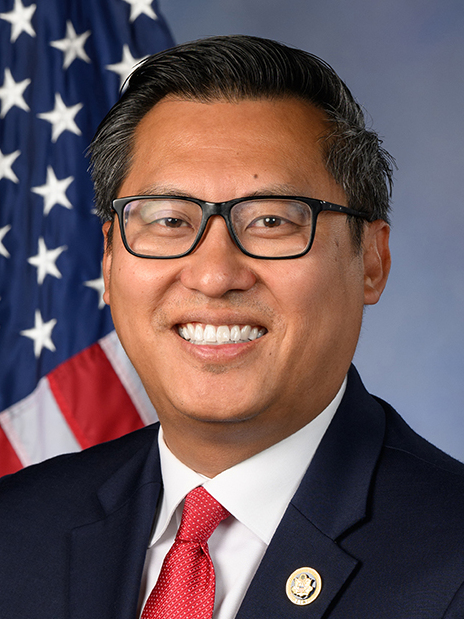

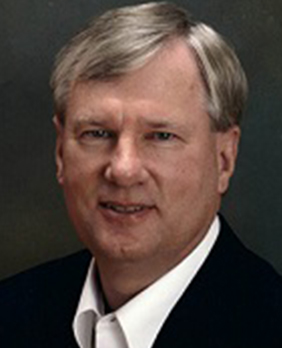
Candidate	Vince Fong (withdrawn)	Ken Weir
Party	Republican	Republican
Popular vote	115,091	79,781
Percentage	59.1%	40.9%
State assemblymember before election
Vince Fong
Republican
State assemblymember after election
Vacant

The incumbent was Republican Vince Fong of Bakersfield. Fong filed to run for re-election, but later filed to run for Congress after 20th congressional district incumbent Kevin McCarthy announced his retirement shortly before the filing deadline. At that point it was too late for Fong to take his name off the ballot in the state assembly race, and no other candidate had filed to run. Despite withdrawing and endorsing Weir, Fong still won the general election but did not take his seat; a special election took place on February 25th, 2025 to fill the vacancy.

=== Candidates ===
==== Declared ====
- Ian David Smith (Republican), business owner (write-in)
- Ken Weir (Republican), Bakersfield city councilor and chair of the Kern County Republican Party (write-in)
- Thomas Willis (Republican), veterinarian (write-in)
- David Wood (Democratic), retired psychologist and former California Senior Legislature senator (write-in)

==== Withdrawn ====
- Vince Fong (Republican), incumbent state assemblymember (remained on ballot)

=== Endorsements ===
Ken Weir (R) (write-in)

U.S. representatives

- Connie Conway, former U.S. representative from California's 22nd congressional district
- Kevin McCarthy, U.S. representative from California's 20th congressional district

State legislators

- Shannon Grove, state senator and former Minority Leader of the California Senate
- Vince Fong, incumbent state assemblymember for this district
Vince Fong (R) (withdrawn)

Political parties

- California Republican Party

=== Results ===
2024 California's 32nd State Assembly district election
Primary election
Party	Candidate	Votes	%
Republican	Vince Fong (incumbent) (withdrawn)	63,337	82.4
Republican	Ken Weir (write-in)	12,221	15.9
Democratic	David Wood (write-in)	777	1.0
Republican	Thomas Willis (write-in)	406	0.5
Republican	Ian David Smith (write-in)	139	0.2
Total votes		76,880	100.0
General election
Republican	Vince Fong (incumbent) (withdrawn)	115,091	59.1
Republican	Ken Weir	79,781	40.9
Total votes		194,872	100.0
Republican hold			

== District 33 ==
2024 California's 33rd State Assembly district election
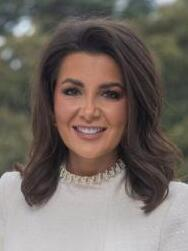

Candidate	Alexandra Macedo	Xavier Avila
Party	Republican	Republican
Popular vote	72,575	42,773
Percentage	62.5%	37.1
State assemblymember before election
Devon Mathis
Republican
State assemblymember after election
Alexandra Macedo
Republican

=== Candidates ===
- Xavier Avila (Republican), dairy farmer
- Hipolito Cerros (Democratic), mayor of Lindsay
- Ruben Macareno (Democratic), Farmersville Unified School Board trustee
- Alexandra Macedo (Republican), agricultural consultant
- Angel Ruiz (Democratic), labor organizer

==== Withdrawn ====
- Hipolito Cerros (Democratic), mayor of Lindsay (remained on ballot)

==== Declined ====
- Devon Mathis (Republican), incumbent state assemblymember (endorsed Macedo)

=== Endorsements ===
Alexandra Macedo (R)

State legislators

- Devon Mathis, state assemblymember for the 33rd district

Labor unions

- Southwest Regional Council of Carpenters
Angel Ruiz (D)

Political parties

- California Democratic Party

=== Results ===
2024 California's 33rd State Assembly district election
Primary election
Party	Candidate	Votes	%
Republican	Alexandra Macedo	22,165	44.1
Republican	Xavier Avila	11,845	23.5
Democratic	Ruben Macareno	7,640	15.2
Democratic	Angel Ruiz	6,292	12.5
Democratic	Hipolito Cerros (withdrawn)	2,375	4.7
Total votes		50,317	100.0
General election
Republican	Alexandra Macedo	72,575	62.9
Republican	Xavier Avila	42,773	37.1
Total votes		115,348	100.0
Republican hold			

== District 34 ==
2024 California's 34th State Assembly district election
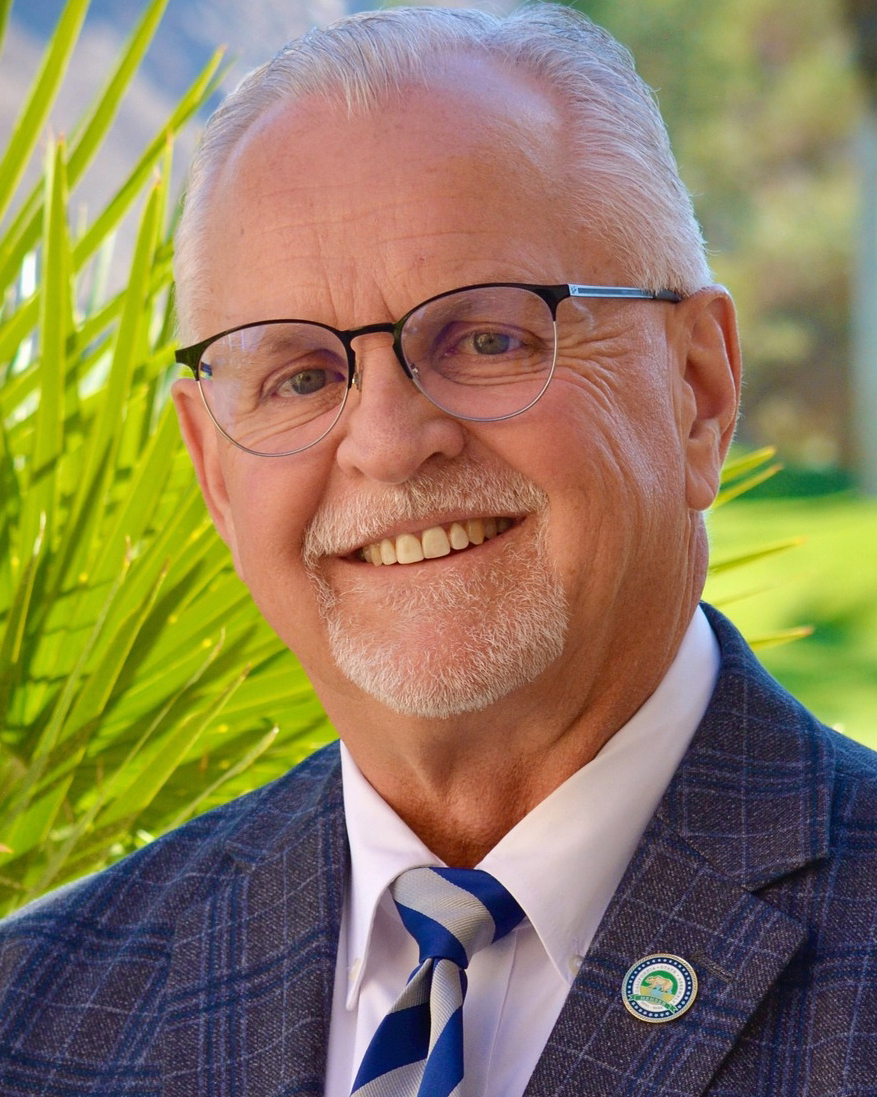

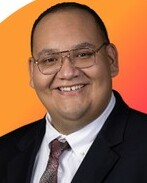
Candidate	Tom Lackey	Ricardo Ortega
Party	Republican	Democratic
Popular vote	117,751	72,152
Percentage	62.0%	38.0%
State assemblymember before election
Tom Lackey
Republican
State assemblymember after election
Tom Lackey
Republican

=== Candidates ===
- Tom Lackey (Republican), incumbent state assemblymember
- Ricardo Ortega (Democratic), member of the Los Angeles County Youth Commission

=== Endorsements ===
Tom Lackey (R)

Labor unions

- California Professional Firefighters
- Southwest Regional Council of Carpenters

Political parties

- California Republican Party
Ricardo Ortega (D)

Political parties

- California Democratic Party

=== Results ===
2024 California's 34th State Assembly district election
Primary election
Party	Candidate	Votes	%
Republican	Tom Lackey (incumbent)	58,283	66.1
Democratic	Ricardo Ortega	29,848	33.9
Total votes		88,131	100.0
General election
Republican	Tom Lackey (incumbent)	117,751	62.0
Democratic	Ricardo Ortega	72,152	38.0
Total votes		189,903	100.0
Republican hold			

== District 35 ==
2024 California's 35th State Assembly district election
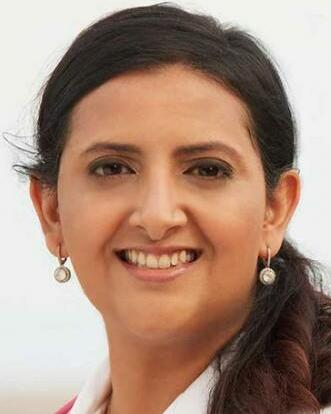

Candidate	Jasmeet Bains	Robert Rosas
Party	Democratic	Republican
Popular vote	59,454	43,821
Percentage	57.6%	42.4%
State assemblymember before election
Jasmeet Bains
Democratic
State assemblymember after election
Jasmeet Bains
Democratic

=== Candidates ===
- Jasmeet Bains (Democratic), incumbent state assemblywoman
- Robert Rosas (Republican), electrician and boardmember of the Kern County Young Republicans

==== Withdrew ====
- Andrae Gonzales (Democratic), vice mayor of Bakersfield

=== Endorsements ===
Jasmeet Baines (D)

Political parties

- California Democratic Party

Labor unions

- AFSCME California

=== Results ===
2024 California's 35th State Assembly district election
Primary election
Party	Candidate	Votes	%
Democratic	Jasmeet Bains (incumbent)	20,183	57.0
Republican	Robert Rosas	15,254	43.0
Total votes		35,437	100.0
General election
Democratic	Jasmeet Bains (incumbent)	59,454	57.6
Republican	Robert Rosas	43,821	42.4
Total votes		103,275	100.0
Democratic hold			

== District 36 ==
2024 California's 36th State Assembly district election
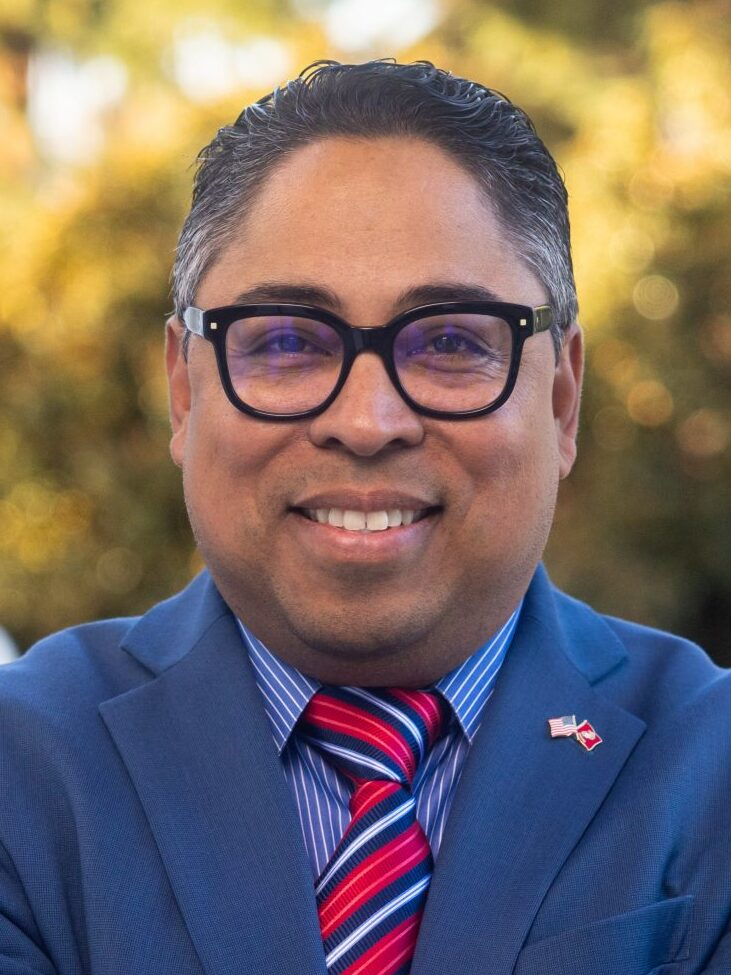

Candidate	Jeff Gonzalez	Joey Acuña
Party	Republican	Democratic
Popular vote	79,477	73,926
Percentage	51.8%	48.2%
State assemblymember before election
Eduardo Garcia
Democratic
State assemblymember after election
Jeff Gonzalez
Republican

=== Candidates ===
- Jose "Joey" Acuña (Democratic), Coachella Valley Unified School Board trustee
- Waymond Fermon (Democratic), Indio city councilor
- Edgard Garcia (Democratic), El Centro city councilor
- Jeff Gonzalez (Republican), businessman
- Kalin Morse (Republican), nonprofit director
- Tomas Oliva (Democratic), El Centro city councilor
- Eric L. Rodriguez (Democratic), president of the Central Union High School District Board of Trustees

==== Declined ====
- Eduardo Garcia (Democratic), incumbent state assemblymember

=== Fundraising ===
Campaign finance reports as of October 19, 2024
Candidate	Raised	Spent	Cash on hand
Joey Acuña (D)	$1,167,236	$1,253,405	$57,651
Jeff Gonzalez (R)	$919,488	$834,383	$96,414
Source: Secretary of State of California

=== Results ===
2024 California's 36th State Assembly district election
Primary election
Party	Candidate	Votes	%
Republican	Jeff Gonzalez	21,626	35.1
Democratic	Joey Acuña	12,262	19.9
Democratic	Edgard Garcia	7,889	12.8
Republican	Kalin Morse	6,985	11.3
Democratic	Waymond Fermon	4,838	7.8
Democratic	Tomas Oliva	4,624	7.5
Democratic	Eric L. Rodriguez	3,458	5.6
Total votes		61,682	100.0
General election
Republican	Jeff Gonzalez	79,477	51.8
Democratic	Joey Acuña	73,926	48.2
Total votes		153,403	100.0
Republican gain from Democratic			

== District 37 ==
2024 California's 37th State Assembly district election
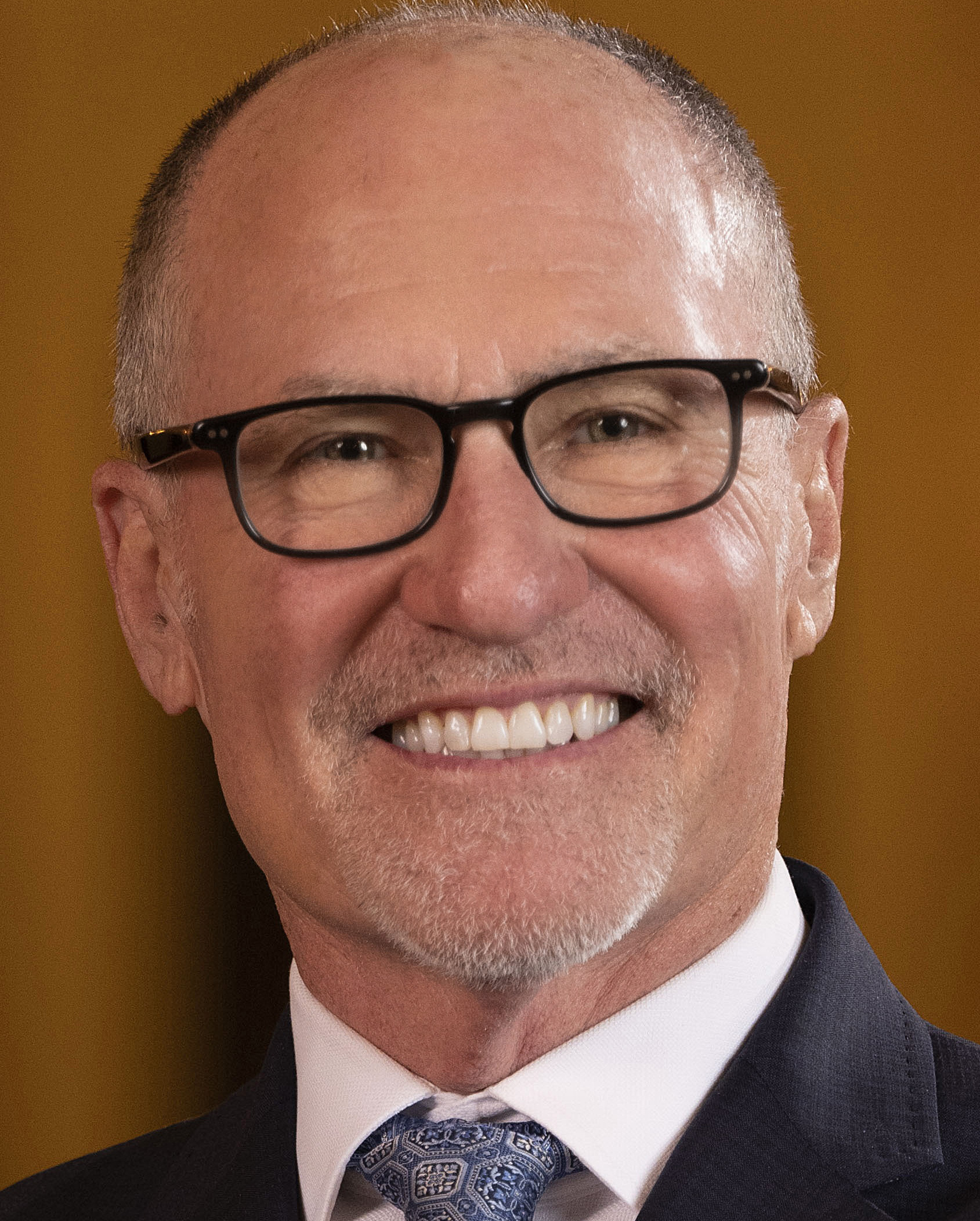

Candidate	Gregg Hart	Sari Domingues
Party	Democratic	Republican
Popular vote	115,216	74,463
Percentage	60.7%	39.3%
State assemblymember before election
Gregg Hart
Democratic
State assemblymember after election
Gregg Hart
Democratic

=== Candidates ===
- Sari Domingues (Republican), retired business analyst
- Gregg Hart (Democratic), incumbent state assemblymember

=== Endorsements ===
Sari Domingues (R)

Political parties

- California Republican Party
Gregg Hart (D)

Political parties

- California Democratic Party

Labor unions

- AFSCME California

=== Results ===
2024 California's 37th State Assembly district election
Primary election
Party	Candidate	Votes	%
Democratic	Gregg Hart (incumbent)	63,766	60.4
Republican	Sari Domingues	41,888	39.6
Total votes		105,654	100.0
General election
Democratic	Gregg Hart (incumbent)	115,216	60.7
Republican	Sari Domingues	74,463	39.3
Total votes		189,679	100.0
Democratic hold			

== District 38 ==
2024 California's 38th State Assembly district election
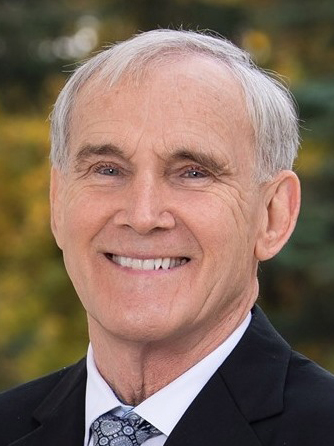

Candidate	Steve Bennett	Deborah Baber
Party	Democratic	Republican
Popular vote	117,387	67,845
Percentage	63.4%	36.6%
State assemblymember before election
Steve Bennett
Democratic
State assemblymember after election
Steve Bennett
Democratic

=== Candidates ===
- Deborah Baber (Republican), retired publishing executive
- Steve Bennett (Democratic), incumbent state assemblymember

=== Endorsements ===
Steve Bennett (D)

Political parties

- California Democratic Party

Labor unions

- AFSCME California

=== Results ===
2024 California's 38th State Assembly district election
Primary election
Party	Candidate	Votes	%
Democratic	Steve Bennett (incumbent)	51,657	61.6
Republican	Deborah Baber	32,233	38.4
Total votes		83,890	100.0
General election
Democratic	Steve Bennett (incumbent)	117,387	63.4
Republican	Deborah Baber	67,845	36.6
Total votes		185,232	100.0
Democratic hold			

== District 39 ==
2024 California's 39th State Assembly district election
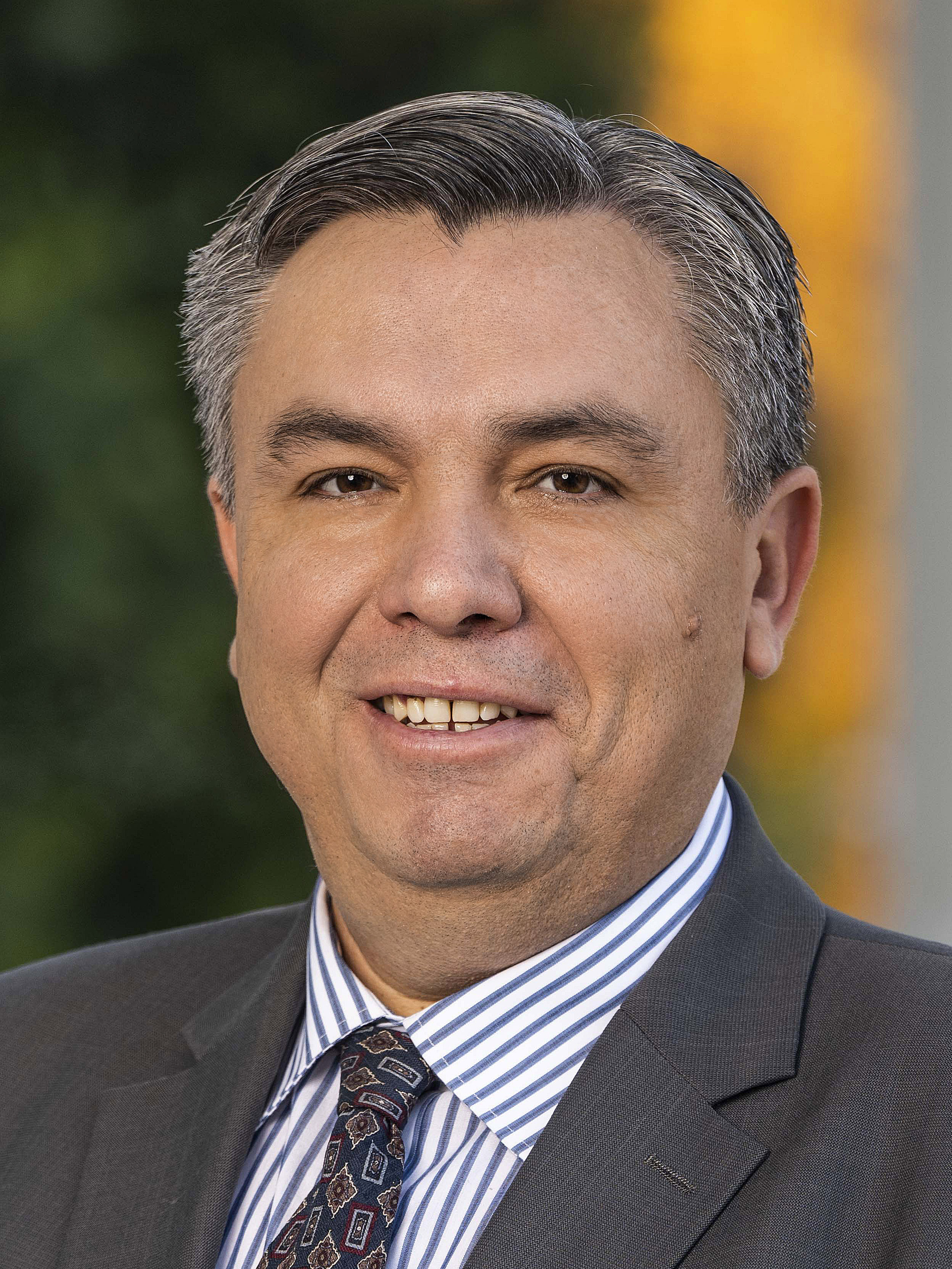

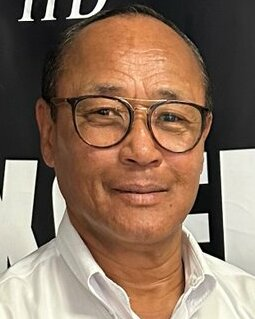
Candidate	Juan Carrillo	Paul Marsh
Party	Democratic	Republican
Popular vote	72,152	52,871
Percentage	57.7%	42.3%
State assemblymember before election
Juan Carrillo
Democratic
State assemblymember after election
Juan Carrillo
Democratic

=== Candidates ===
- Juan Carrillo (Democratic), incumbent state assemblymember
- Paul Marsh (Republican), community liaison for San Bernardino County supervisor Paul Cook and runner-up for this district in 2022

=== Endorsements ===
Juan Carrillo (D)

Political parties

- California Democratic Party

Labor unions

- AFSCME California

=== Results ===
2024 California's 39th State Assembly district election
Primary election
Party	Candidate	Votes	%
Democratic	Juan Carrillo Ventura (incumbent)	22,339	53.3
Republican	Paul Marsh	19,565	46.7
Total votes		41,904	100.0
General election
Democratic	Juan Carrillo Ventura (incumbent)	72,152	57.7
Republican	Paul Marsh	52,871	42.3
Total votes		125,023	100.0
Democratic hold			

== District 40 ==
2024 California's 40th State Assembly district election
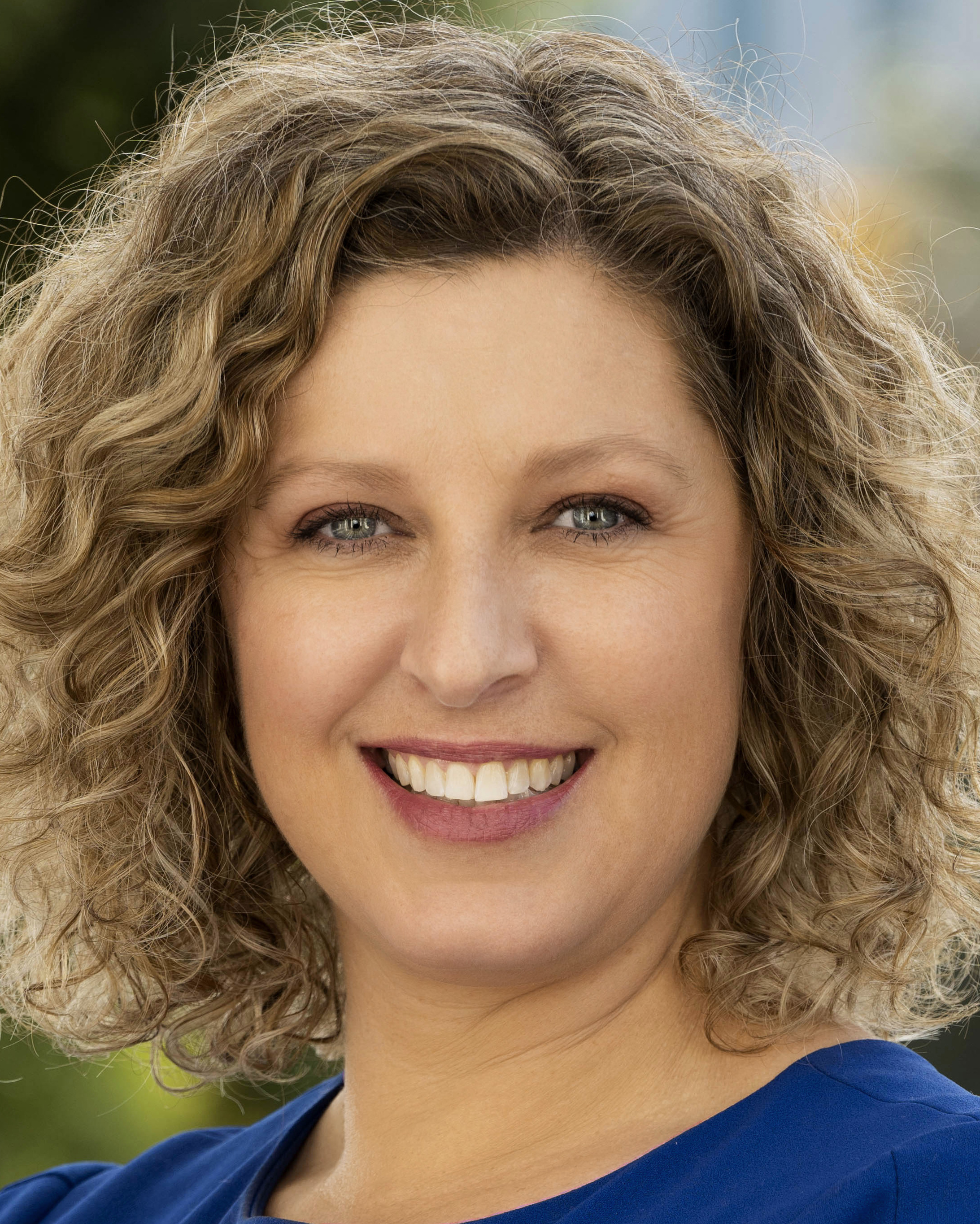

Candidate	Pilar Schiavo	Patrick Lee Gipson
Party	Democratic	Republican
Popular vote	119,654	106,960
Percentage	52.8%	47.2%
State assemblymember before election
Pilar Schiavo
Democratic
State assemblymember after election
Pilar Schiavo
Democratic

=== Candidates ===
- Patrick Lee Gipson (Republican), retired deputy sheriff
- Pilar Schiavo (Democratic), incumbent state assemblymember

=== Endorsements ===
Patrick Lee Gipson (R)

Newspapers

- Los Angeles Daily News
- Santa Clarita Valley Signal

Political parties

- California Republican Party

Organizations

- California Republican Assembly
Pilar Schiavo (D)

Political parties

- California Democratic Party

Labor unions

- AFSCME California

=== Fundraising ===
Campaign finance reports as of October 19, 2024
Candidate	Raised	Spent	Cash on hand
Pilar Schiavo (D)	$2,308,743	$3,191,624	$127,429
Patrick Gipson (R)	$228,784	$271,983	$9,379
Source: Secretary of State of California

=== Results ===
2024 California's 40th State Assembly district election
Primary election
Party	Candidate	Votes	%
Democratic	Pilar Schiavo (incumbent)	54,941	50.2
Republican	Patrick Lee Gipson	54,420	49.8
Total votes		109,361	100.0
General election
Democratic	Pilar Schiavo (incumbent)	119,654	52.8
Republican	Patrick Lee Gipson	106,960	47.2
Total votes		226,614	100.0
Democratic hold			

== District 41 ==
2024 California's 41st State Assembly district election
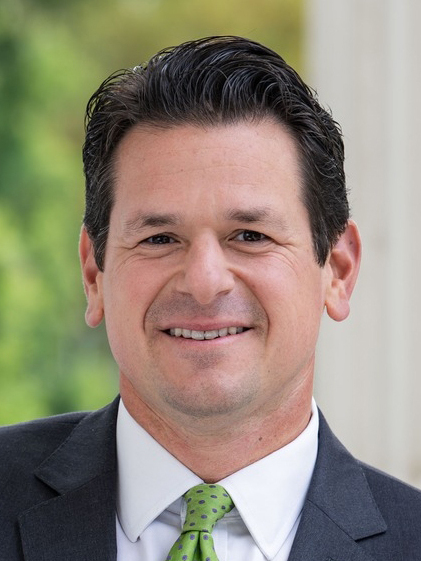

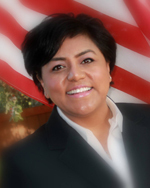
Candidate	John Harabedian	Michelle Del Rosario Martinez
Party	Democratic	Republican
Popular vote	137,293	97,336
Percentage	58.5%	41.5%
State assemblymember before election
Chris Holden
Democratic
State assemblymember after election
John Harabedian
Democratic

The incumbent was Democrat Chris Holden of Pasadena, who was term-limited and ran for the Los Angeles County Board of Supervisors.

=== Candidates ===
- Michelle Del Rosario Martinez (Republican), former Altadena town councilor (2014–2016)
- John Harabedian (Democratic), former mayor of Sierra Madre
- Jed Leano (Democratic), Claremont city councilor
- Phlunté Riddle (Democratic), former Pasadena Police Lieutenant

==== Withdrawn ====
- Felicia Williams (Democratic), Pasadena city councilor (running for re-election)

=== Endorsements ===
Michelle Del Rosario Martinez (R)

Political parties

- California Republican Party
John Harabedian (D)

State legislators

- Tom Umberg, state senator

Labor unions

- AFSCME California (co-endorsement with Riddle)
Phlunté Riddle (D)

Labor unions

- AFSCME California (co-endorsement with Harabedian)

Newspapers

- Los Angeles Sentinel
Declined to endorse

Political parties

- California Democratic Party

=== Results ===
2024 California's 41st State Assembly district election
Primary election
Party	Candidate	Votes	%
Republican	Michelle Del Rosario Martinez	48,800	39.8
Democratic	John Harabedian	36,454	29.7
Democratic	Phlunté Riddle	19,011	15.5
Democratic	Jed Leano	18,356	15.0
Total votes		122,621	100.0
General election
Democratic	John Harabedian	137,293	58.5
Republican	Michelle Del Rosario Martinez	97,336	41.5
Total votes		234,629	100.0
Democratic hold			

== District 42 ==
2024 California's 42nd State Assembly district election

Candidate	Jacqui Irwin	Ted Nordblum
Party	Democratic	Republican
Popular vote	147,218	123,940
Percentage	54.3%	45.7%
State assemblymember before election
Jacqui Irwin
Democratic
State assemblymember after election
Jacqui Irwin
Democratic

=== Candidates ===
- Jacqui Irwin (Democratic), incumbent state assemblymember
- Ted Nordblum (Republican), business owner and candidate for this district in 2022

=== Endorsements ===
Jacqui Irwin (D)

Political parties

- California Democratic Party

Labor unions

- AFSCME California
Ted Nordblum (R)

Political parties

- California Republican Party

=== Results ===
2024 California's 42nd State Assembly district election
Primary election
Party	Candidate	Votes	%
Democratic	Jacqui Irwin (incumbent)	78,046	54.5
Republican	Ted Nordblum	65,155	45.5
Total votes		143,201	100.0
General election
Democratic	Jacqui Irwin (incumbent)	147,218	54.3
Republican	Ted Nordblum	123,940	45.7
Total votes		271,158	100.0
Democratic hold			

== District 43 ==
2024 California's 43rd State Assembly district election
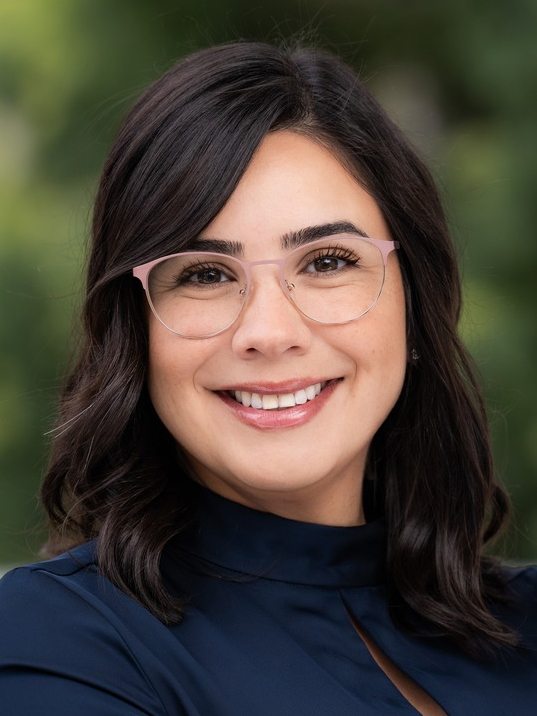

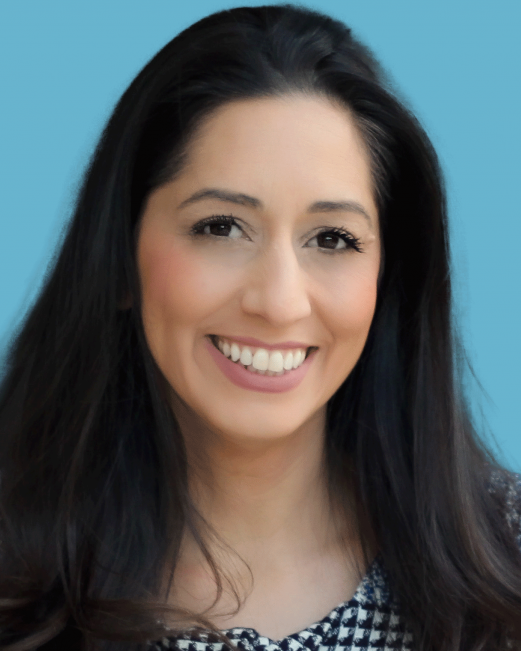
Candidate	Celeste Rodriguez	Victoria Garcia
Party	Democratic	Republican
Popular vote	85,983	43,028
Percentage	66.6%	33.4%
State assemblymember before election
Luz Rivas
Democratic
State assemblymember after election
Celeste Rodriguez
Democratic

=== Candidates ===
- Victoria Garcia (Republican), San Fernando city councilor
- Walter Garcia (Democratic), aide for California Attorney General Rob Bonta and former director of communications for Los Angeles city councilor Monica Rodriguez (2022–2023)
- Saul Hurtado (Democratic), program manager
- Carmelina Minasova (no party preference), homeless crisis advocate
- Felicia Novick (Republican), office administrator
- Celeste Rodriguez (Democratic), mayor of San Fernando

==== Declined ====
- Luz Rivas (Democratic), incumbent state assemblymember (running for U.S. House)

=== Endorsements ===
Victoria Garcia (R)

Political parties

- California Republican Party

=== Results ===
2024 California's 43rd State Assembly district election
Primary election
Party	Candidate	Votes	%
Democratic	Celeste Rodriguez	20,485	43.5
Republican	Victoria Garcia	11,077	23.5
Democratic	Walter Garcia	8,070	17.1
Republican	Felicia Novick	3,431	7.3
No party preference	Carmelina Minasova	2,045	4.3
Democratic	Saul Hurtado	2,024	4.3
Total votes		47,132	100.0
General election
Democratic	Celeste Rodriguez	85,983	66.6
Republican	Victoria Garcia	43,028	33.4
Total votes		129,011	100.0
Democratic hold			

== District 44 ==
2024 California's 44th State Assembly district election
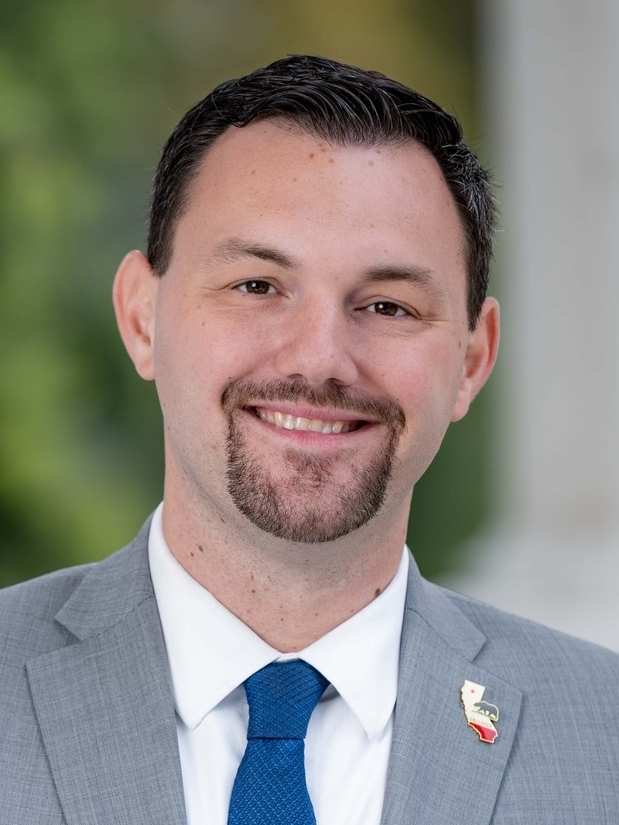

Candidate	Nick Schultz	Tony Rodriguez
Party	Democratic	Republican
Popular vote	143,625	74,316
Percentage	65.9%	34.1%
State assemblymember before election
Laura Friedman
Democratic
State assemblymember after election
Nick Schultz
Democratic

The incumbent was Democrat Laura Friedman of Glendale, who retired to run for U.S. House.

=== Candidates ===
- Elen Asatryan (Democratic), Glendale city councilor
- Ed Han (Democratic), UCLA School of Law lecturer and U.S. Air Force reservist
- Carmenita Helligar (Democratic), nonprofit director
- Steve Pierson (Democratic), progressive activist
- Adam Pryor (Democratic), server
- Tony Rodriguez (Republican), construction manager
- Nick Schultz (Democratic), mayor of Burbank
- Adam Summer (no party preference), Studio City neighborhood councilor

=== Endorsements ===
Elen Asatryan (D)

State senators

- Anthony Portantino, SD-26

State assemblymembers

- Adrin Nazarian, AD-46

County officials

- Kathryn Barger, Los Angeles County supervisor (Republican)

Organizations

- Glendale Police Officers Association
Tony Rodriguez (R)

Political parties

- California Republican Party
Nick Schultz (D)

Labor unions

- AFSCME California
Declined to endorse

Political parties

- California Democratic Party

=== Results ===
2024 California's 44th State Assembly district election
Primary election
Party	Candidate	Votes	%
Democratic	Nick Schultz	31,121	28.3
Republican	Tony Rodriguez	28,280	25.7
Democratic	Ed Han	17,589	16.0
Democratic	Elen Asatryan	14,692	13.3
Democratic	Steve Pierson	8,508	7.7
Democratic	Carmenita Helligar	6,178	5.6
No party preference	Adam Summer	2,224	2.0
Democratic	Adam Pryor	1,566	1.4
Total votes		110,158	100.0
General election
Democratic	Nick Schultz	143,625	65.9
Republican	Tony Rodriguez	74,316	34.1
Total votes		217,941	100.0
Democratic hold			

== District 45 ==
2024 California's 45th State Assembly district election
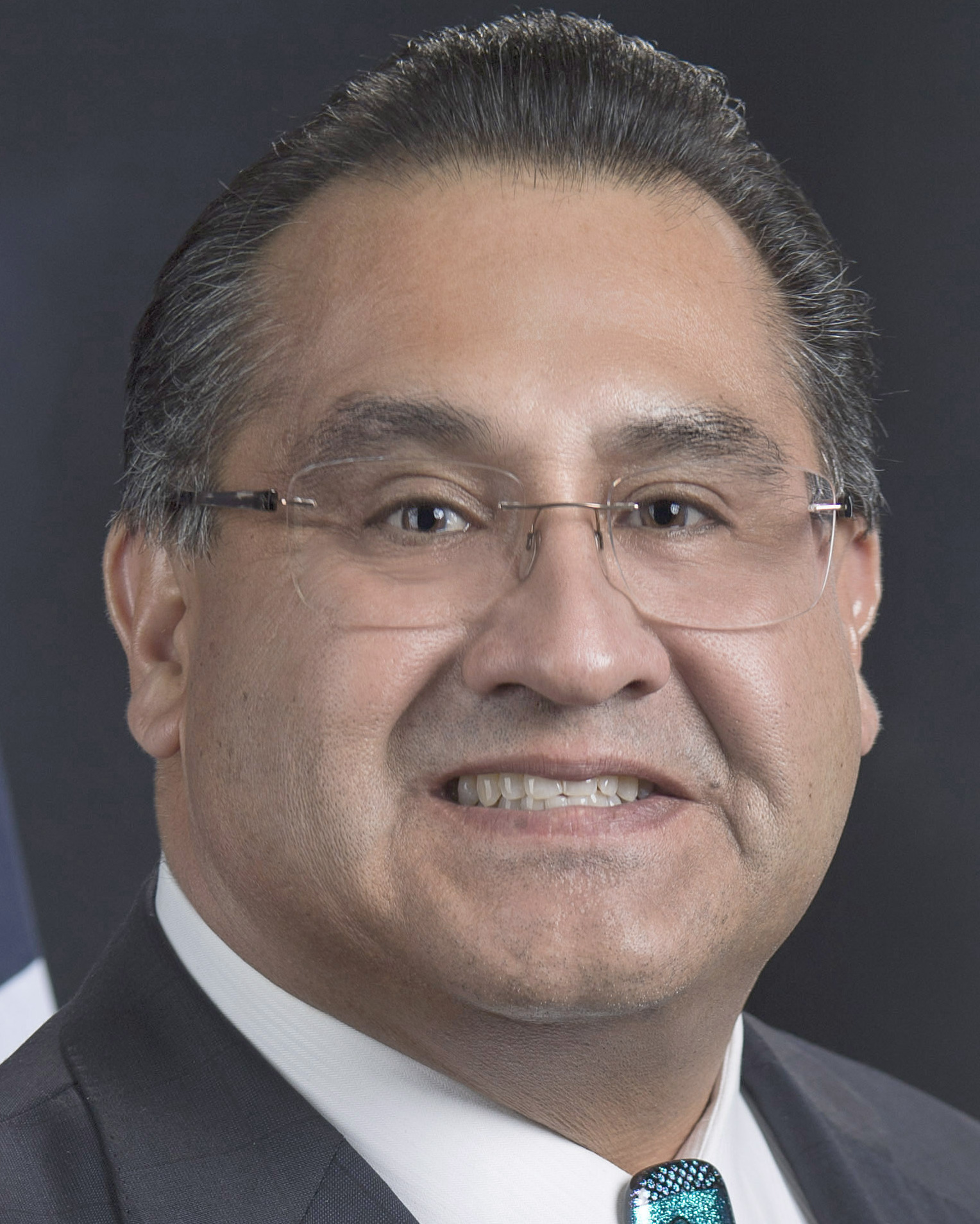

Candidate	James Ramos	Scott Olson
Party	Democratic	Republican
Popular vote	87,062	49,304
Percentage	63.8%	36.2%
State assemblymember before election
James Ramos
Democratic
State assemblymember after election
James Ramos
Democratic

=== Candidates ===
- Scott Olson (Republican) (write-in)
- James Ramos (Democratic), incumbent state assemblymember

=== Endorsements ===
James Ramos (D)

Political parties

- California Democratic Party

Labor unions

- AFSCME California

=== Results ===
2024 California's 45th State Assembly district election
Primary election
Party	Candidate	Votes	%
Democratic	James Ramos (incumbent)	31,826	99.0
Republican	Scott Olson (write-in)	334	1.0
Total votes		32,160	100.0
General election
Democratic	James Ramos (incumbent)	87,062	63.8
Republican	Scott Olson	49,304	36.2
Total votes		136,366	100.0
Democratic hold			

== District 46 ==
2024 California's 46th State Assembly district election
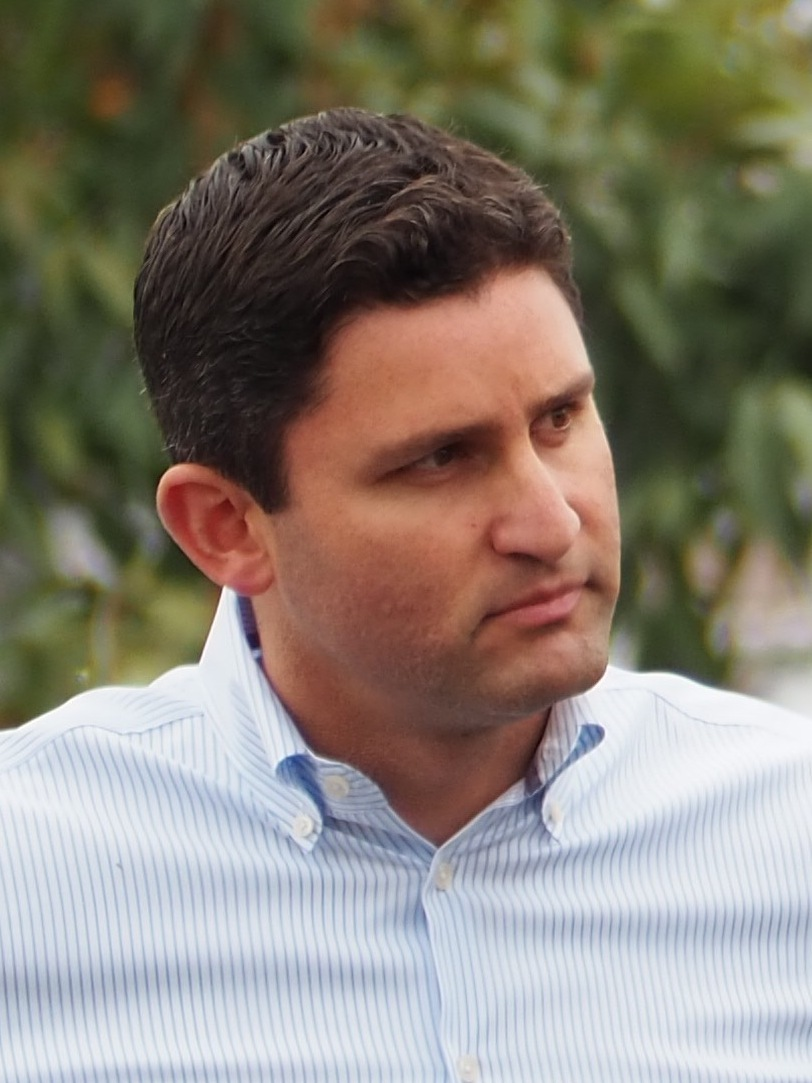

Candidate	Jesse Gabriel	Tracey Schroeder
Party	Democratic	Republican
Popular vote	107,003	63,114
Percentage	62.9%	37.1%
State assemblymember before election
Jesse Gabriel
Democratic
State assemblymember after election
Jesse Gabriel
Democratic

=== Candidates ===
- Jesse Gabriel (Democratic), incumbent state assemblymember
- Tracey Schroeder (Republican), teacher

=== Endorsements ===
Jesse Gabriel (D)

Political parties

- California Democratic Party

Labor unions

- AFSCME California
Tracey Schroeder (R)

Political parties

- California Republican Party

=== Results ===
2024 California's 46th State Assembly district election
Primary election
Party	Candidate	Votes	%
Democratic	Jesse Gabriel (incumbent)	50,156	65.5
Republican	Tracey Schroeder	26,371	34.5
Total votes		76,527	100.0
General election
Democratic	Jesse Gabriel (incumbent)	107,003	62.9
Republican	Tracey Schroeder	63,114	37.1
Total votes		170,117	100.0
Democratic hold			

== District 47 ==
2024 California's 47th State Assembly district election
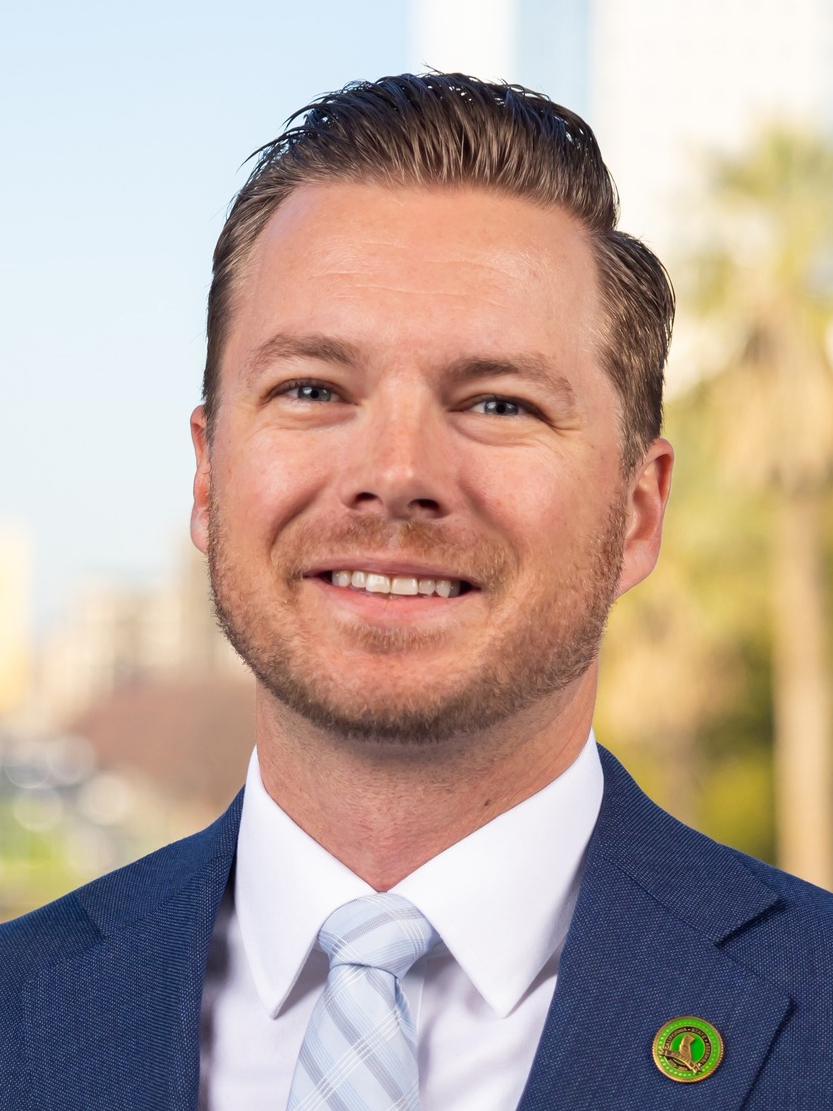

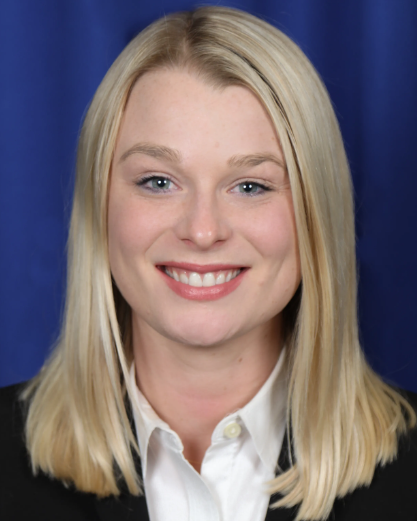
Candidate	Greg Wallis	Christy Holstege
Party	Republican	Democratic
Popular vote	119,072	113,538
Percentage	51.2%	48.8%
State assemblymember before election
Greg Wallis
Republican
State assemblymember after election
Greg Wallis
Republican

=== Candidates ===
- Christy Holstege (Democratic), Palm Springs city councilor and runner-up for this district in 2022
- Jamie Swain (Democratic), truck driver
- Greg Wallis (Republican), incumbent state assemblymember

=== Endorsements ===
Christy Holstege (D)

Political parties

- California Democratic Party

Labor unions

- AFSCME California
- California Faculty Association
Greg Wallis (R)

Labor unions

- California Correctional Peace Officers Association
- California Professional Firefighters
- Southwest Regional Council of Carpenters

Organizations

- California Rifle and Pistol Association
- Howard Jarvis Taxpayers Association
- National Federation of Independent Business
- NRA Political Victory Fund

Newspapers

- Inland Valley Daily Bulletin
- Press-Enterprise
- Redlands Daily Facts
- The San Bernardino Sun

Political parties

- California Republican Party

=== Fundraising ===
Campaign finance reports as of October 19, 2024
Candidate	Raised	Spent	Cash on hand
Greg Wallace (R)	$1,741,436	$2,001,455	$147,706
Christy Holstege (D)	$2,414,007	$2,741,534	$363,380
Source: Secretary of State of California

=== Results ===
2024 California's 47th State Assembly district election
Primary election
Party	Candidate	Votes	%
Republican	Greg Wallis (incumbent)	58,312	48.6
Democratic	Christy Holstege	55,677	46.4
Democratic	Jamie Swain	6,115	5.1
Total votes		120,104	100.0
General election
Republican	Greg Wallis (incumbent)	119,072	51.2
Democratic	Christy Holstege	113,538	48.8
Total votes		232,610	100.0
Republican hold			

== District 48 ==
2024 California's 48th State Assembly district election
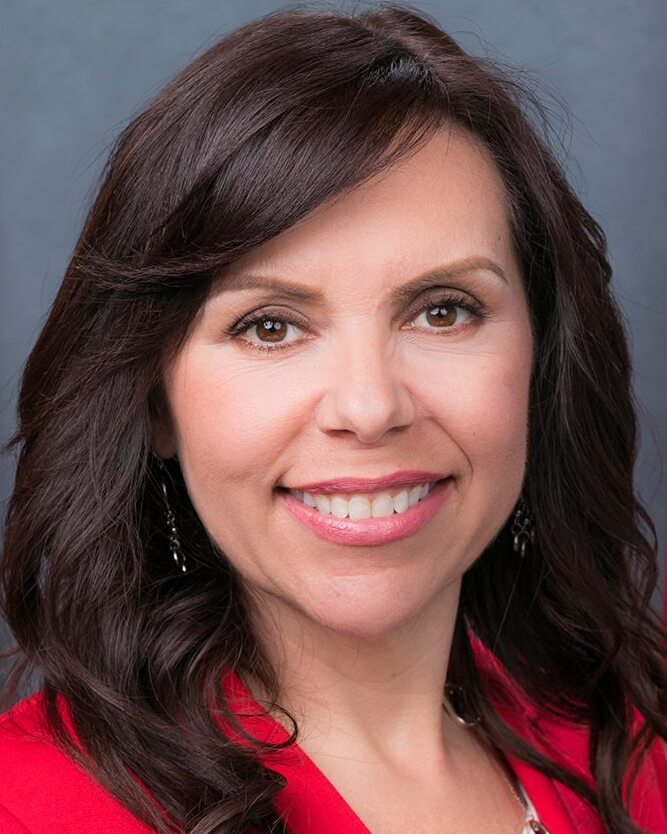

Candidate	Blanca Rubio	Dan Tran
Party	Democratic	Republican
Popular vote	101,637	62,880
Percentage	61.8%	38.2%
State assemblymember before election
Blanca Rubio
Democratic
State assemblymember after election
Blanca Rubio
Democratic

=== Candidates ===
- Blanca Rubio (Democratic), incumbent state assemblymember
- Brian Calderón Tabatabai (Democratic), West Covina city councilor
- Dan Tran (Republican), vice president of Fidelity National Financial SoCal Region

=== Endorsements ===
Blanca Rubio (D)

Political parties

- California Democratic Party
Brian Calderón Tabatabai (D)

U.S. representatives

- Grace Napolitano, U.S. representative

State legislators

- Bob Archuleta, state senator
- Anthony Rendon, state assemblyman

Political parties

- California Working Families Party

=== Results ===
2024 California's 48th State Assembly district election
Primary election
Party	Candidate	Votes	%
Democratic	Blanca Rubio (incumbent)	27,471	41.4
Republican	Dan Tran	26,226	39.5
Democratic	Brian Calderón Tabatabai	12,712	19.1
Total votes		66,409	100.0
General election
Democratic	Blanca Rubio (incumbent)	101,637	61.8
Republican	Dan Tran	62,880	38.2
Total votes		164,517	100.0
Democratic hold			

== District 49 ==
2024 California's 49th State Assembly district election
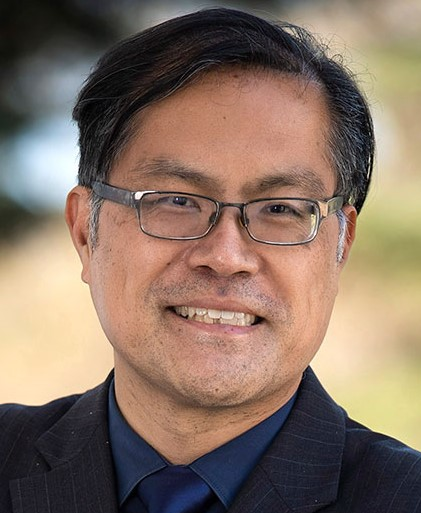

Candidate	Mike Fong	David Liu
Party	Democratic	Republican
Popular vote	92,514	56,795
Percentage	62.0%	38.0%
State assemblymember before election
Mike Fong
Democratic
State assemblymember after election
Mike Fong
Democratic

=== Candidates ===
- Mike Fong (Democratic), incumbent state assemblymember
- Long "David" Liu (Republican), attorney

=== Endorsements ===
Mike Fong (D)

Political parties

- California Democratic Party

Labor unions

- AFSCME California
David Liu (R)

Political parties

- California Republican Party

=== Results ===
2024 California's 49th State Assembly district election
Primary election
Party	Candidate	Votes	%
Democratic	Mike Fong (incumbent)	42,164	64.0
Republican	David Liu	23,678	36.0
Total votes		65,842	100.0
General election
Democratic	Mike Fong (incumbent)	92,514	62.0
Republican	David Liu	56,795	38.0
Total votes		149,309	100.0
Democratic hold			

== District 50 ==
2024 California's 50th State Assembly district election
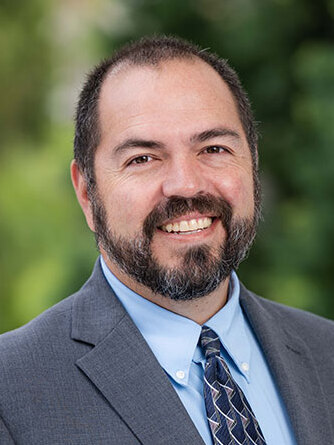

Candidate	Robert Garcia	Adam Perez
Party	Democratic	Democratic
Popular vote	77,923	60,360
Percentage	56.4%	43.6%
State assemblymember before election
Eloise Reyes
Democratic
State assemblymember after election
Robert Garcia
Democratic

The incumbent was Democrat Eloise Reyes of Colton, who ran for state senate.

=== Candidates ===
- Robert Garcia (Democratic), member of the Etiwanda School Board
- Adam Perez (Democratic), vice president of the Fontana Unified School Board
- DeJonae Shaw (Democratic), nurse
- Sharon Stein (Republican) (write-in)

=== Endorsements ===
Robert Garcia (D)

State legislators

- Eloise Reyes, state assemblywoman for this district

Political parties

- California Democratic Party
Adam Perez (D)

State legislators

- Blanca Rubio, state assemblywoman
DeJonae Shaw (D)

Political parties

- California Working Families Party

Labor unions

- AFSCME California
- California Faculty Association

=== Results ===
2024 California's 50th State Assembly district election
Primary election
Party	Candidate	Votes	%
Democratic	Robert Garcia	18,176	42.0
Democratic	Adam Perez	12,557	29.0
Democratic	DeJonae Shaw	12,194	28.1
Republican	Sharon Stein (write-in)	397	0.9
Total votes		43,324	100.0
General election
Democratic	Robert Garcia	77,923	56.4
Democratic	Adam Perez	60,360	43.6
Total votes		138,283	100.0
Democratic hold			

== District 51 ==
2024 California's 51st State Assembly district election
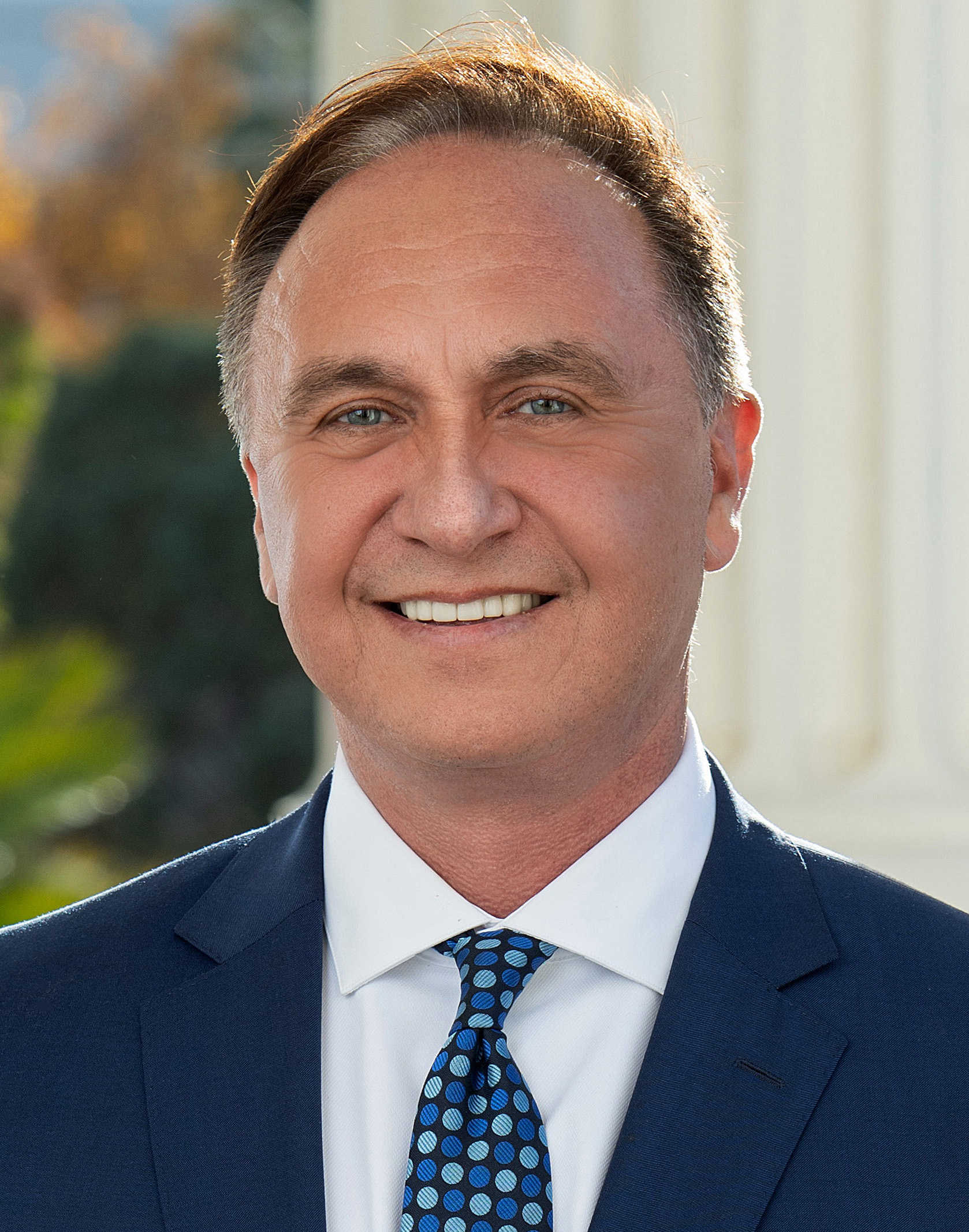

Candidate	Rick Chavez Zbur	Stephan Hohil
Party	Democratic	Republican
Popular vote	154,114	51,365
Percentage	75.0%	25.0%
State assemblymember before election
Rick Chavez Zbur
Democratic
State assemblymember after election
Rick Chavez Zbur
Democratic

=== Candidates ===
- Shiva Bagheri (Republican), business owner
- Stephan Hohil (Republican), entrepreneur
- Rick Chavez Zbur (Democratic), incumbent state assemblymember

=== Endorsements ===
Shiva Bagheri (R)

Political parties

- California Republican Party
Rick Chavez Zbur (D)

Political parties

- California Democratic Party

Labor unions

- AFSCME California

=== Results ===
2024 California's 51st State Assembly district election
Primary election
Party	Candidate	Votes	%
Democratic	Rick Chavez Zbur (incumbent)	76,838	78.3
Republican	Stephen Hohil	10,710	10.9
Republican	Shiva Bagheri	10,610	10.8
Total votes		98,158	100.0
General election
Democratic	Rick Chavez Zbur (incumbent)	154,114	75.0
Republican	Stephan Hohil	51,365	25.0
Total votes		205,479	100.0
Democratic hold			

== District 52 ==
2024 California's 52nd State Assembly district election
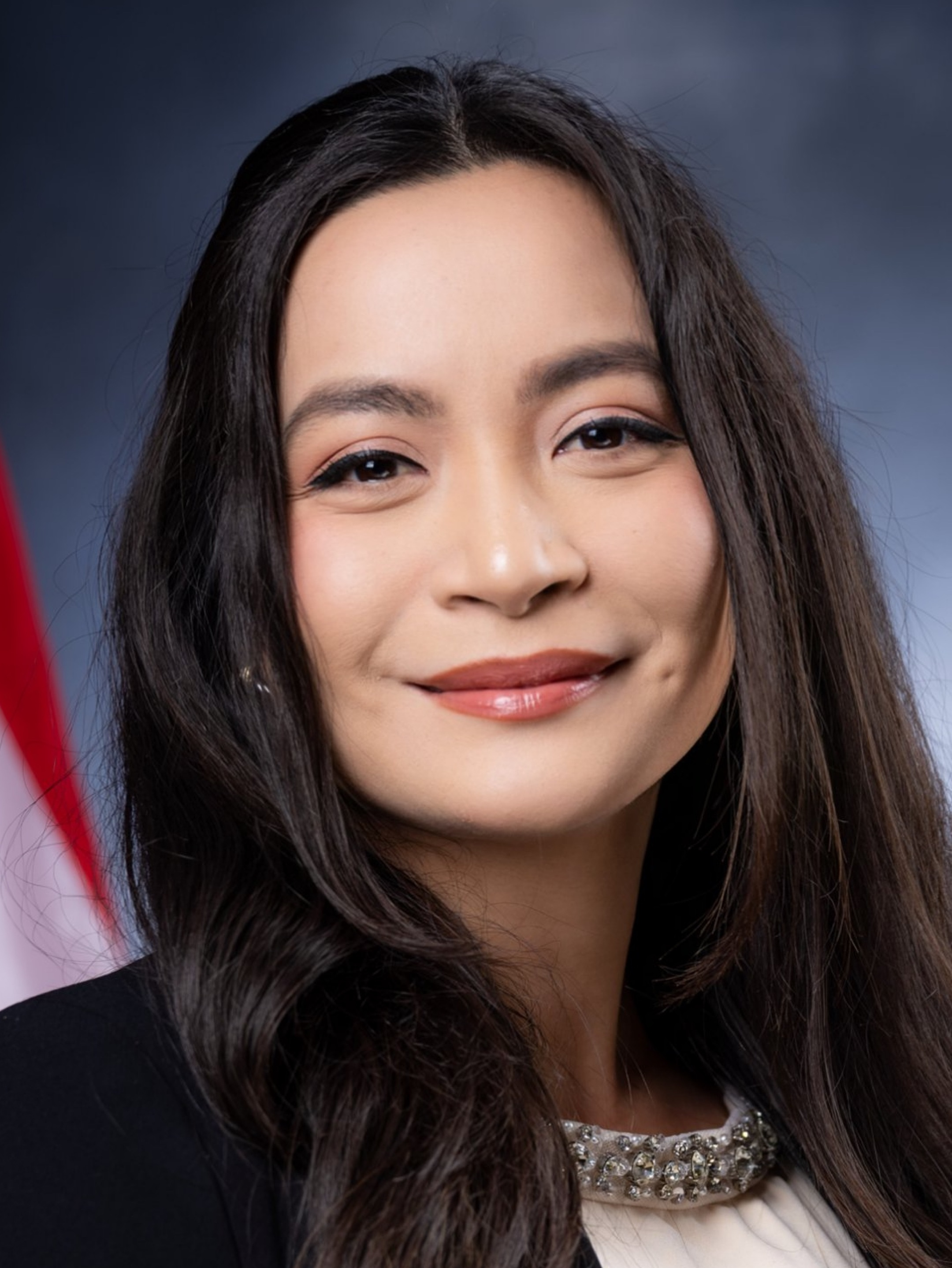

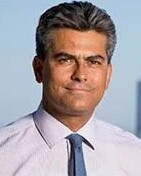
Candidate	Jessica Caloza	Franky Carrillo
Party	Democratic	Democratic
Popular vote	108,882	53,820
Percentage	66.9%	33.1%
State assemblymember before election
Wendy Carrillo
Democratic
State assemblymember after election
Jessica Caloza
Democratic

The incumbent was Democrat Wendy Carrillo, who retired to run for Los Angeles City Council.

=== Candidates ===
- Jessica Caloza (Democratic), aide to California Attorney General Rob Bonta and former member of the Los Angeles Board of Public Works
- Franky Carrillo (Democratic), member of the Los Angeles County Probation Oversight Commission (no relation to incumbent Wendy Carrillo)
- Genesis Coronado (Democratic), legislative analyst for the Los Angeles Unified School District
- Anthony Libertino Fanara (Democratic), restaurant owner
- David Girón (Democratic), policy advisor for Los Angeles city councilor Bob Blumenfield
- Carlos León (Democratic), probation officer
- Shannel Pittman (Green), co-chair of the Green Party National Diversity Committee
- Sofia Quinones (Democratic), community advocate
- Ari Ruiz (Democratic), aide to U.S. Representative Maxine Waters and former member of the Los Angeles County Commission on Insurance
- Stephen Sills (Republican), research assistant

==== Withdrawn ====
- Justine Gonzalez (Democratic), former legislative aide to then–Los Angeles mayor Antonio Villaraigosa

==== Declined ====
- Wendy Carrillo (Democratic), incumbent state assemblywoman (running for Los Angeles City Council)

=== Endorsements ===
Jessica Caloza (D)

State legislators

- Isaac Bryan, state assemblyman
- Alex Lee, state assemblyman
- Tina McKinnor, state assemblywoman
Franky Carrillo (D)

Local officials

- Eunisses Hernandez, Los Angeles city councilor
- Yusef Salaam, New York City councilor
Carlos León (D)

Labor unions

- AFSCME California
Ari Ruiz (D)

State legislators

- Juan Carrillo, state assemblyman
- Jacqui Irwin, state assemblywoman
- Blanca Rubio, state assemblywoman
- Susan Rubio, state senator

County officials

- Kathryn Barger, Los Angeles County supervisor (Republican)

Newspapers

- Los Angeles Sentinel
Declined to endorse

Political parties

- California Democratic Party

=== Results ===
2024 California's 52nd State Assembly district election
Primary election
Party	Candidate	Votes	%
Democratic	Jessica Caloza	23,391	29.8
Democratic	Franky Carrillo	20,569	26.2
Republican	Stephen Sills	10,082	12.8
Democratic	David Girón	9,184	11.7
Democratic	Ari Ruiz	5,832	7.4
Democratic	Carlos J. León	2,628	3.3
Democratic	Genesis Coronado	2,583	3.3
Democratic	Sofia Quinones	2,080	2.6
Green	Shannel Pittman	1,160	1.5
Democratic	Anthony Libertino Fanara	992	1.3
Total votes		78,501	100.0
General election
Democratic	Jessica Caloza	108,882	66.9
Democratic	Franky Carrillo	53,820	33.1
Total votes		162,702	100.0
Democratic hold			

== District 53 ==
2024 California's 53rd State Assembly district election
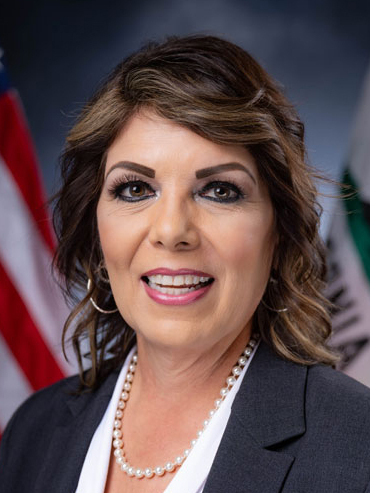

Candidate	Michelle Rodriguez	Nick Wilson
Party	Democratic	Republican
Popular vote	83,371	61,380
Percentage	57.6%	42.4%
State assemblymember before election
Freddie Rodriguez
Democratic
State assemblymember after election
Michelle Rodriguez
Democratic

The incumbent was Democrat Freddie Rodriguez of Pomona, who was term-limited.

=== Candidates ===
- Carlos Goytia (Democratic), secretary of the Three Valleys Municipal Water District Board of Directors
- Javier Hernandez (Democratic), immigrant advocacy nonprofit executive
- Michelle Rodriguez (Democratic), member of the California Police Officer Standards and Training Commission and wife of incumbent Freddie Rodriguez
- Robert Torres (Democratic), Pomona city councilor
- Nick Wilson (Republican), retired police officer

=== Endorsements ===
Javier Hernandez (D)

Political parties

- California Working Families Party

Labor unions

- California Faculty Association
- California Federation of Labor (AFL-CIO) (co-endorsement with Torres)
Robert Torres (D)

Political parties

- California Democratic Party

Labor unions

- California Federation of Labor (AFL-CIO) (co-endorsement with Hernandez)
Nick Wilson (R)

Political parties

- California Republican Party

=== Results ===
2024 California's 53rd State Assembly district election
Primary election
Party	Candidate	Votes	%
Republican	Nick Wilson	23,050	43.0
Democratic	Michelle Rodriguez	10,835	20.2
Democratic	Robert S. Torres	8,894	16.6
Democratic	Javier Hernandez	8,422	15.7
Democratic	Carlos Goytia	2,348	4.4
Total votes		53,549	100.0
General election
Democratic	Michelle Rodriguez	83,371	57.6
Republican	Nick Wilson	61,380	42.4
Total votes		144,751	100.0
Democratic hold			

== District 54 ==
2024 California's 54th State Assembly district election
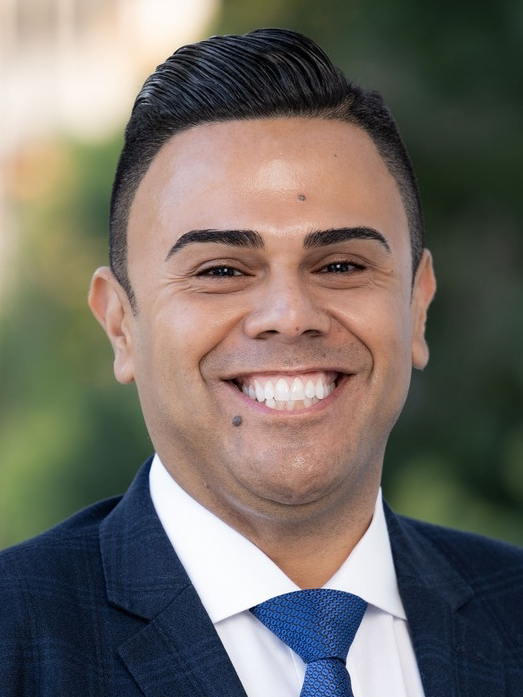

Candidate	Mark Gonzalez	John Yi
Party	Democratic	Democratic
Popular vote	59,549	46,309
Percentage	56.3%	43.7%
State assemblymember before election
Miguel Santiago
Democratic
State assemblymember after election
Mark Gonzalez
Democratic

The incumbent was Democrat Miguel Santiago, who retired to run for Los Angeles City Council.

=== Candidates ===
- Elaine Alaniz (Republican), healthcare recruiter
- Mark Gonzalez (Democratic), district director for incumbent state assemblyman Miguel Santiago and chair of the Los Angeles County Democratic Party
- John Yi (Democratic), nonprofit executive

==== Declined ====
- Miguel Santiago (Democratic), incumbent state assemblymember (running for Los Angeles City Council)

=== Endorsements ===
Elaine Alaniz (R)

Political parties

- California Republican Party
Mark Gonzalez (D)

Political parties

- California Democratic Party

Labor unions

- AFSCME California
- California Faculty Association

Organizations

- California Environmental Voters

=== Results ===
2024 California's 54th State Assembly district election
Primary election
Party	Candidate	Votes	%
Democratic	Mark Gonzalez	19,616	45.2
Democratic	John Yi	14,963	34.5
Republican	Elaine Alaniz	8,819	20.3
Total votes		43,398	100.0
General election
Democratic	Mark Gonzalez	59,549	56.3
Democratic	John Yi	46,309	43.7
Total votes		105,858	100.0
Democratic hold			

== District 55 ==
2024 California's 55th State Assembly district election
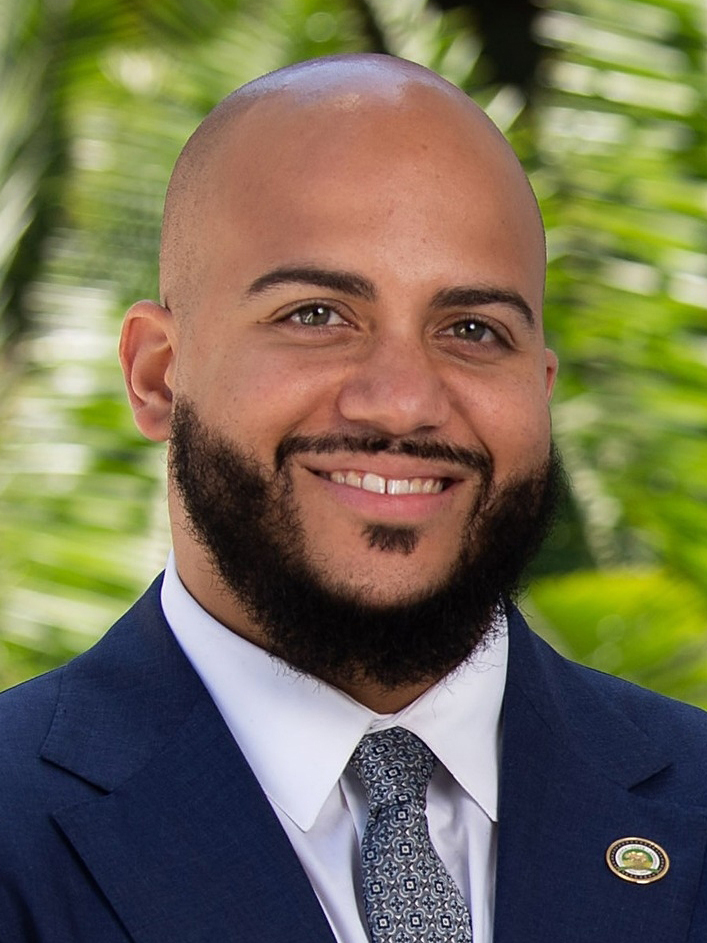

Candidate	Isaac Bryan	Keith Cascio
Party	Democratic	Republican
Popular vote	148,062	35,316
Percentage	80.7%	19.3%
State assemblymember before election
Isaac Bryan
Democratic
State assemblymember after election
Isaac Bryan
Democratic

=== Candidates ===
- Isaac Bryan (Democratic), incumbent state assemblymember
- Keith Cascio (Republican), software developer

=== Endorsements ===
Isaac Bryan (D)

Political parties

- California Democratic Party
- California Working Families Party

Labor unions

- AFSCME California

Newspapers

- Los Angeles Sentinel
Keith Cascio (R)

Political parties

- California Republican Party

=== Results ===
2024 California's 55th State Assembly district election
Primary election
Party	Candidate	Votes	%
Democratic	Isaac Bryan (incumbent)	75,063	83.9
Republican	Keith Cascio	14,421	16.1
Total votes		89,484	100.0
General election
Democratic	Isaac Bryan (incumbent)	148,062	80.7
Republican	Keith Cascio	35,316	19.3
Total votes		183,378	100.0
Democratic hold			

== District 56 ==
2024 California's 56th State Assembly district election
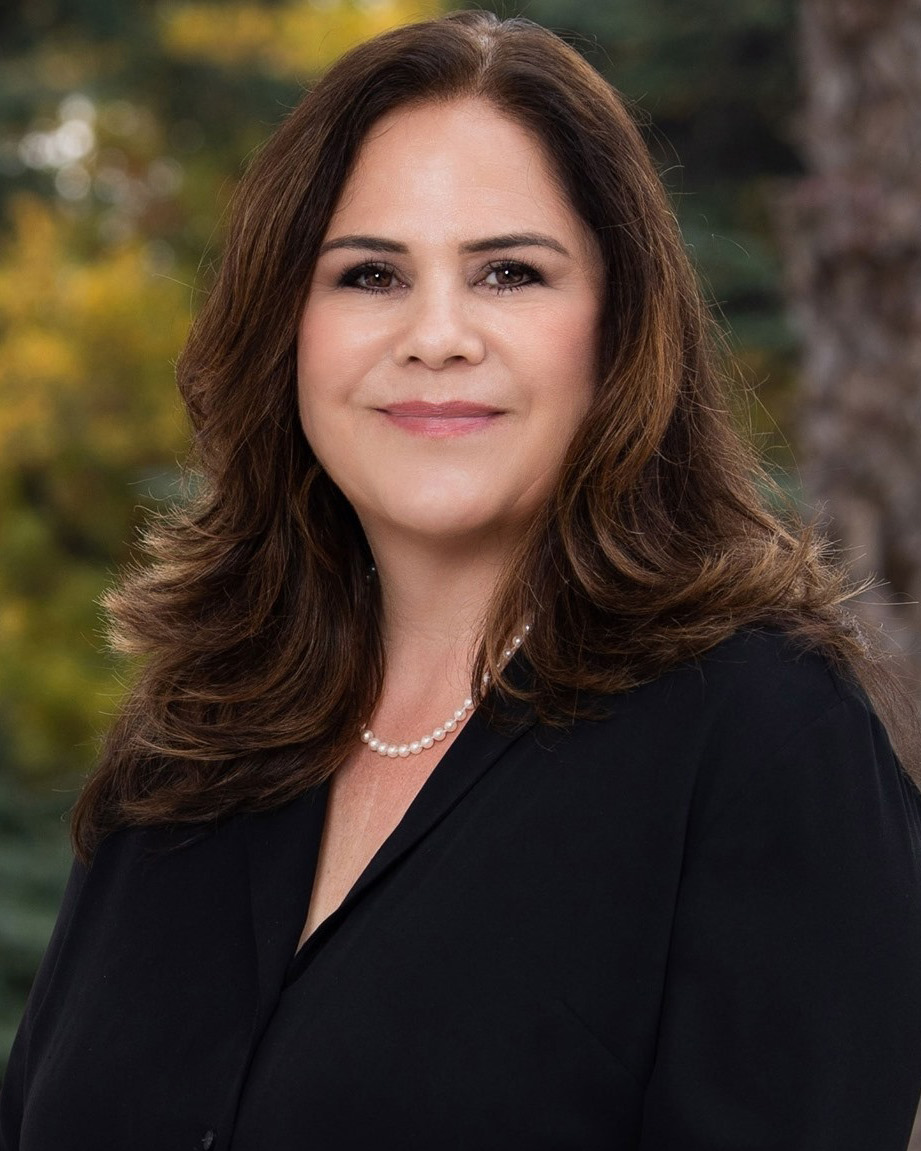

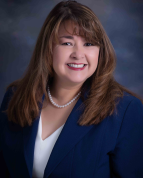
Candidate	Lisa Calderon	Jessica Martinez
Party	Democratic	Republican
Popular vote	94,470	72,198
Percentage	56.7%	43.3%
State assemblymember before election
Lisa Calderon
Democratic
State assemblymember after election
Lisa Calderon
Democratic

=== Candidates ===
- Lisa Calderon (Democratic), incumbent state assemblymember
- Jessica Martinez (Republican), Whittier city councilor and runner-up for this district in 2018, 2020, and 2022
- Natasha Serrano (Republican), human resources administrator and candidate for this district in 2022

=== Endorsements ===
Lisa Calderon (D)

Political parties

- California Democratic Party

Labor unions

- AFSCME California
Jessica Martinez (R)

Political parties

- California Republican Party

=== Results ===
2024 California's 56th State Assembly district election
Primary election
Party	Candidate	Votes	%
Democratic	Lisa Calderon (incumbent)	38,003	56.4
Republican	Jessica Martinez	21,678	32.1
Republican	Natasha Serrano	7,751	11.5
Total votes		67,432	100.0
General election
Democratic	Lisa Calderon (incumbent)	94,470	56.7
Republican	Jessica Martinez	72,198	43.3
Total votes		166,668	100.0
Democratic hold			

== District 57 ==
2024 California's 57th State Assembly district election
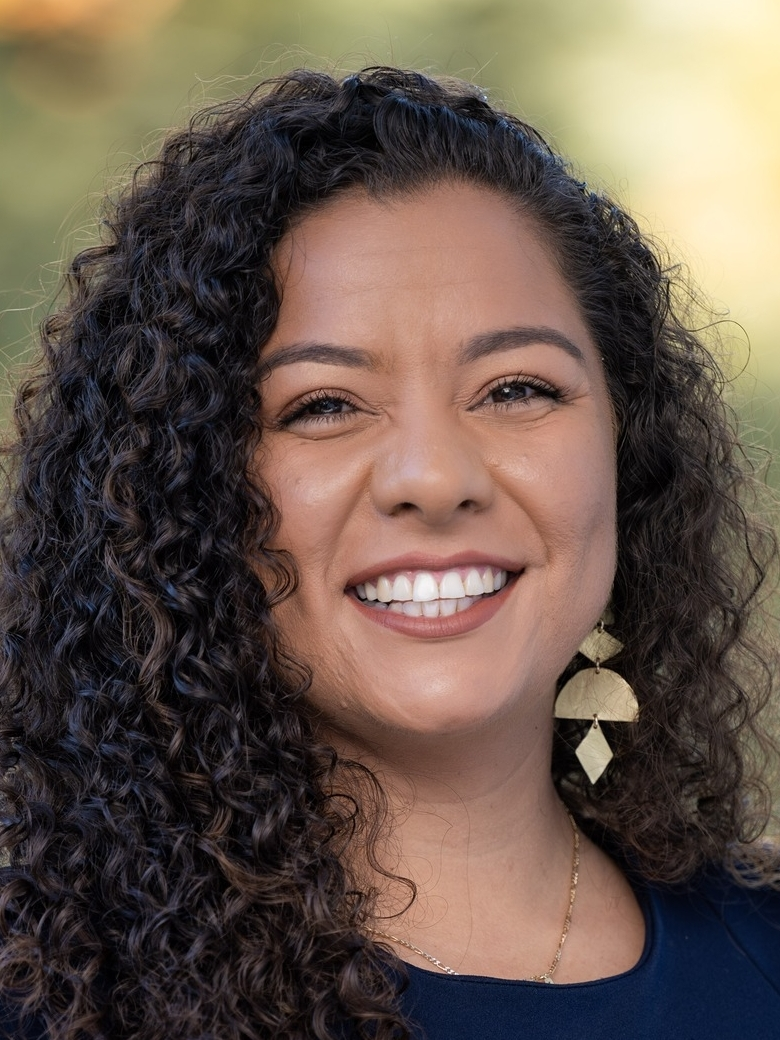

Candidate	Sade Elhawary	Efren Martinez
Party	Democratic	Democratic
Popular vote	54,117	34,506
Percentage	61.1%	38.9%
State assemblymember before election
Reggie Jones-Sawyer
Democratic
State assemblymember after election
Sade Elhawary
Democratic

The incumbent was Democrat Reggie Jones-Sawyer, who was term-limited and ran for Los Angeles City Council.

=== Candidates ===
- Greg Akili (Democratic), labor organizer
- Sade Elhawary (Democratic), community organizer
- Efren Martinez (Democratic), educator and runner-up for this district in 2020
- Tara Perry (Democratic), reparations advocate
- Dulce Vasquez (Democratic), college administrator

==== Withdrawn ====
- René Romero (Democratic), former field representative for state senator Maria Elena Durazo

=== Endorsements ===
Greg Akili (D)

Labor unions

- California Faculty Association (co-endorsement with Elhawary)
Sade Elhawary (D)

State senators

- Isadore Hall III, SD-35 (2014–2016)
- Kevin Murray, SD-26 (1998–2006)
- Lola Smallwood-Cuevas, SD-28 (2022–present)

State assemblymembers

- Isaac Bryan, AD-55 (2021–present)
- Reggie Jones-Sawyer, AD-57 (2012–present)
- Tina McKinnor, AD-61 (2022–present)

County officials

- Holly Mitchell, Los Angeles County Supervisor from the 2nd district (2020–present)
- Hilda Solis, Los Angeles County Supervisor from the 1st District (2014–present)

Local officials

- Marqueece Harris-Dawson, Los Angeles City Councilor for the 8th district (2015–present)

Political parties

- California Working Families Party

Labor unions

- AFSCME California
- California Faculty Association (co-endorsement with Akili)

Newspapers

- Los Angeles Sentinel

Organizations

- California Environmental Voters
Declined to endorse

Political parties

- California Democratic Party

=== Results ===
2024 California's 57th State Assembly district election
Primary election
Party	Candidate	Votes	%
Democratic	Efren Martinez	8,891	32.7
Democratic	Sade Elhawary	8,443	31.1
Democratic	Dulce Vasquez	3,648	13.4
Democratic	Greg Akili	3,088	11.4
Democratic	Tara Perry	3,083	11.4
Total votes		27,153	100.0
General election
Democratic	Sade Elhawary	54,117	61.1
Democratic	Efren Martinez	34,506	38.9
Total votes		88,623	100.0
Democratic hold			

== District 58 ==
2024 California's 58th State Assembly district election

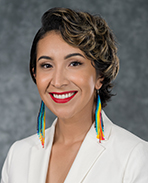
Candidate	Leticia Castillo	Clarissa Cervantes
Party	Republican	Democratic
Popular vote	78,292	77,696
Percentage	50.2%	49.8%
State assemblymember before election
Sabrina Cervantes
Democratic
State assemblymember after election
Leticia Castillo
Republican

The incumbent was Democrat Sabrina Cervantes, who retired to run for state senate.

=== Candidates ===
- Leticia Castillo (Republican), psychotherapist and candidate for this district in 2022
- Clarissa Cervantes (Democratic), Riverside city councilor and sister of incumbent Sabrina Cervantes
- Ronaldo Fierro (Democratic), Riverside city councilor

=== Endorsements ===
Leticia Castillo (R)

Organizations

- California Rifle and Pistol Association
- Howard Jarvis Taxpayers Association

Newspapers

- Press-Enterprise

Political parties

- California Republican Party
Clarissa Cervantes (D)

Labor unions

- AFSCME California
- California Faculty Association
Declined to endorse

Political parties

- California Democratic Party

=== Fundraising ===
Campaign finance reports as of October 19, 2024
Candidate	Raised	Spent	Cash on hand
Clarissa Cervantes (D)	$486,448	$672,078	$122,323
Leticia Castillo (R)	$55,520	$35,554	$21,721
Source: Secretary of State of California

=== Results ===
2024 California's 58th State Assembly district election
Primary election
Party	Candidate	Votes	%
Republican	Leticia Castillo	29,500	48.6
Democratic	Clarissa Cervantes	15,713	25.9
Democratic	Ronald Fierro	15,514	25.5
Total votes		60,727	100.0
General election
Republican	Leticia Castillo	78,292	50.2
Democratic	Clarissa Cervantes	77,696	49.8
Total votes		155,988	100.0
Republican gain from Democratic			

== District 59 ==
2024 California's 59th State Assembly district election
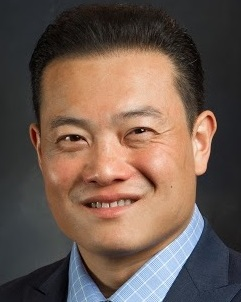

Candidate	Phillip Chen	Dave Obrand
Party	Republican	Democratic
Popular vote	139,113	90,834
Percentage	60.5%	39.5%
State assemblymember before election
Phillip Chen
Republican
State assemblymember after election
Phillip Chen
Republican

=== Candidates ===
- Phillip Chen (Republican), incumbent state assemblymember
- Dave Obrand (Democratic), Orange County deputy counsel

=== Endorsements ===
Phillip Chen (R)

Political parties

- California Republican Party

Labor unions

- AFSCME California
- Southwest Regional Council of Carpenters
Dave Obrand (D)

Political parties

- California Democratic Party

=== Results ===
2024 California's 59th State Assembly district election
Primary election
Party	Candidate	Votes	%
Republican	Phillip Chen (incumbent)	75,179	63.8
Democratic	Dave Obrand	42,719	36.2
Total votes		117,898	100.0
General election
Republican	Phillip Chen (incumbent)	139,113	60.5
Democratic	Dave Obrand	90,834	39.5
Total votes		229,947	100.0
Republican hold			

== District 60 ==
2024 California's 60th State Assembly district election
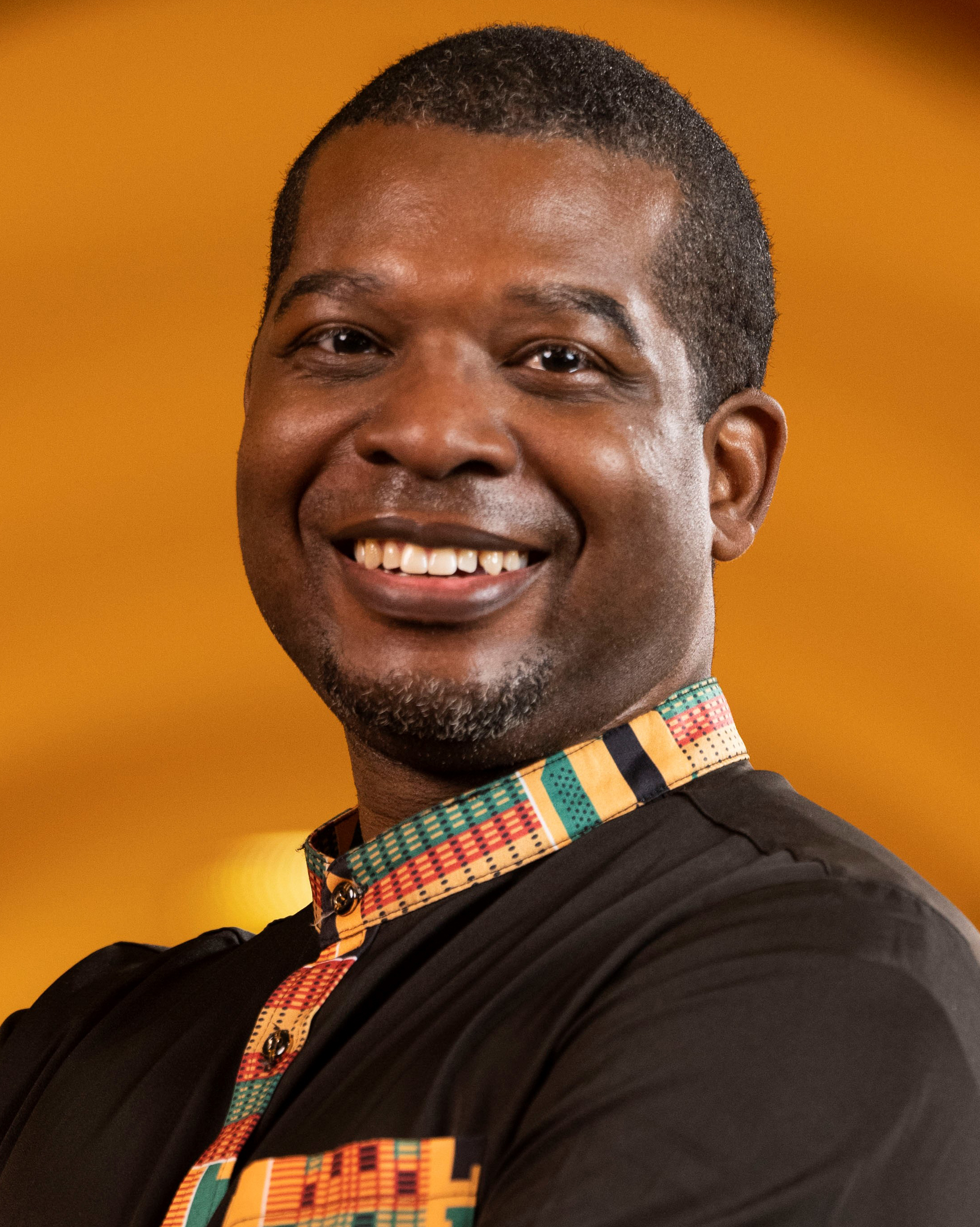

Candidate	Corey Jackson	Ron Edwards
Party	Democratic	Republican
Popular vote	71,922	58,017
Percentage	55.4%	44.6%
State assemblymember before election
Corey Jackson
Democratic
State assemblymember after election
Corey Jackson
Democratic

=== Candidates ===
- Hector Diaz Nava (Republican), business owner and runner-up for the district in 2022
- Ron Edwards (Republican), business owner
- Corey Jackson (Democratic), incumbent state assemblymember

=== Endorsements ===
Corey Jackson (D)

Political parties

- California Democratic Party
- California Working Families Party

Labor unions

- AFSCME California

=== Results ===
2024 California's 60th State Assembly district election
Primary election
Party	Candidate	Votes	%
Democratic	Corey Jackson (incumbent)	22,921	51.8
Republican	Ron Edwards	12,021	27.1
Republican	Hector Diaz Nava	9,336	21.1
Total votes		44,278	100.0
General election
Democratic	Corey Jackson (incumbent)	71,922	55.4
Republican	Ron Edwards	58,017	44.6
Total votes		129,939	100.0
Democratic hold			

== District 61 ==
2024 California's 61st State Assembly district election
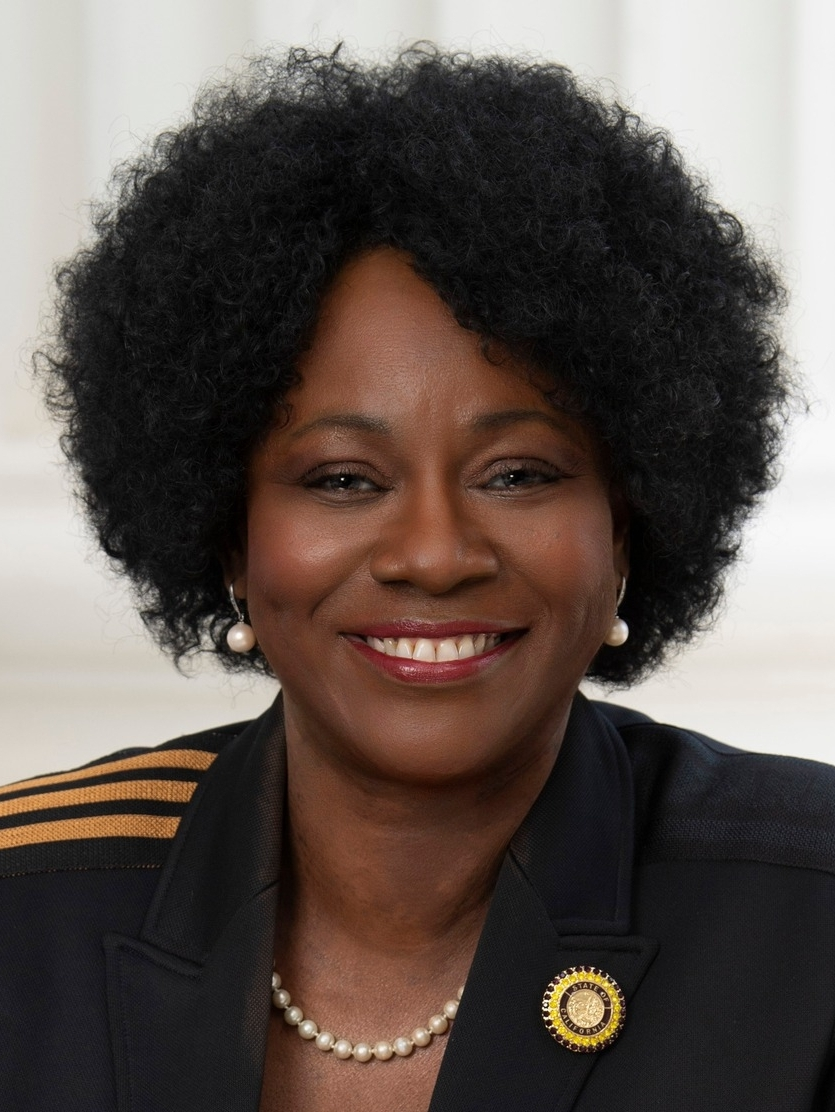

Candidate	Tina McKinnor	Alfonso Hernandez
Party	Democratic	Republican
Popular vote	121,661	37,375
Percentage	76.5%	23.5%
State assemblymember before election
Tina McKinnor
Democratic
State assemblymember after election
Tina McKinnor
Democratic

=== Candidates ===
- Alfonso Hernandez (Republican), restaurant owner and former Blythe city councilor
- Tina McKinnor (Democratic), incumbent state assemblymember

=== Endorsements ===
Alfonso Hernandez (R)

Political parties

- California Republican Party
Tina McKinnor (D)

Political parties

- California Democratic Party
- California Working Families Party

Labor unions

- AFSCME California

Newspapers

- Los Angeles Sentinel

=== Results ===
2024 California's 61st State Assembly district election
Primary election
Party	Candidate	Votes	%
Democratic	Tina McKinnor (incumbent)	52,273	79.5
Republican	Alfonso Hernandez	13,487	20.5
Total votes		65,760	100.0
General election
Democratic	Tina McKinnor (incumbent)	121,661	76.5
Republican	Alfonso Hernandez	37,375	23.5
Total votes		159,036	100.0
Democratic hold			

== District 62 ==
2024 California's 62nd State Assembly district election
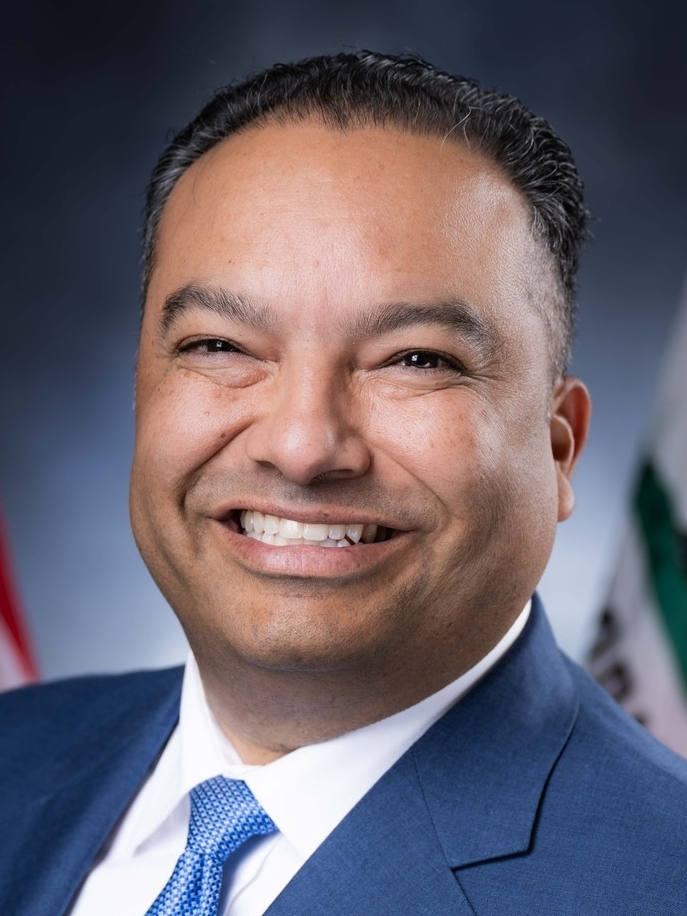

Candidate	Jose Solache	Paul Jones
Party	Democratic	Republican
Popular vote	85,383	43,974
Percentage	66.0%	34.0%
State assemblymember before election
Anthony Rendon
Democratic
State assemblymember after election
Jose Solache
Democratic

The incumbent was Anthony Rendon of Lakewood, who was term-limited.

=== Candidates ===
- Maria Estrada (Democratic), accountant and runner-up for this district in 2018, 2020, and 2022
- Paul Jones (Republican), retiree
- Jose Solache (Democratic), Lynwood city councilor

=== Endorsements ===
Jose Solache (D)

State assemblymembers

- Anthony Rendon (AD62)

Political parties

- California Democratic Party

Labor unions

- AFSCME California
- California Faculty Association

=== Results ===
2024 California's 62nd State Assembly district election
Primary election
Party	Candidate	Votes	%
Democratic	Jose Solache	19,050	41.4
Republican	Paul Jones	15,798	34.4
Democratic	Maria Estrada	11,117	24.2
Total votes		45,965	100.0
General election
Democratic	Jose Solache	85,383	66.0
Republican	Paul Jones	43,974	34.0
Total votes		129,357	100.0
Democratic hold			

== District 63 ==
2024 California's 63rd State Assembly district election
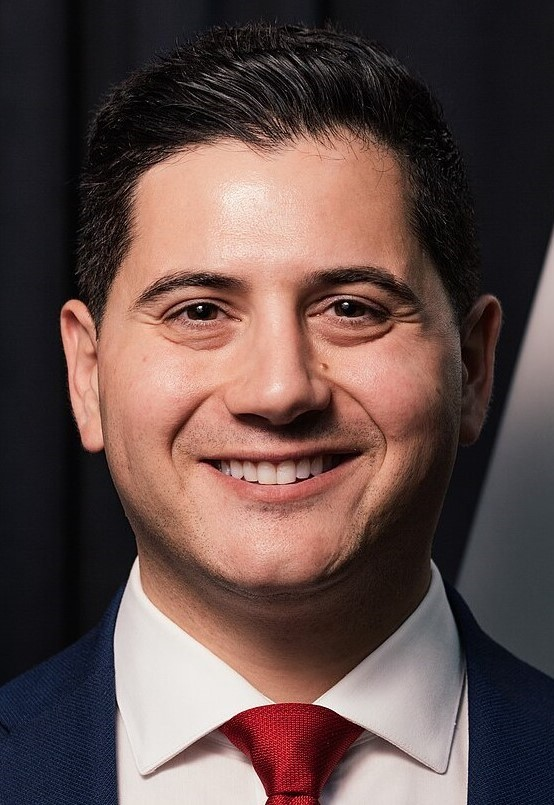

Candidate	Bill Essayli	Chris Shoults
Party	Republican	Democratic
Popular vote	122,968	91,708
Percentage	57.3%	42.7%
State assemblymember before election
Bill Essayli
Republican
State assemblymember after election
Bill Essayli
Republican

=== Candidates ===
- Bill Essayli (Republican), incumbent state assemblymember
- Orlando Munguia (no party preference), beekeeper
- Chris Shoults (Democratic), educator

=== Endorsements ===
Bill Essayli (R)

Newspapers

- Press-Enterprise

Political parties

- California Republican Party

=== Results ===
2024 California's 63rd State Assembly district election
Primary election
Party	Candidate	Votes	%
Republican	Bill Essayli (incumbent)	54,295	60.5
Democratic	Chris Shoults	32,708	36.4
No party preference	Orlando Munguia	2,735	3.0
Total votes		89,738	100.0
General election
Republican	Bill Essayli (incumbent)	122,968	57.3
Democratic	Chris Shoults	91,708	42.7
Total votes		214,676	100.0
Republican hold			

== District 64 ==
2024 California's 64th State Assembly district election
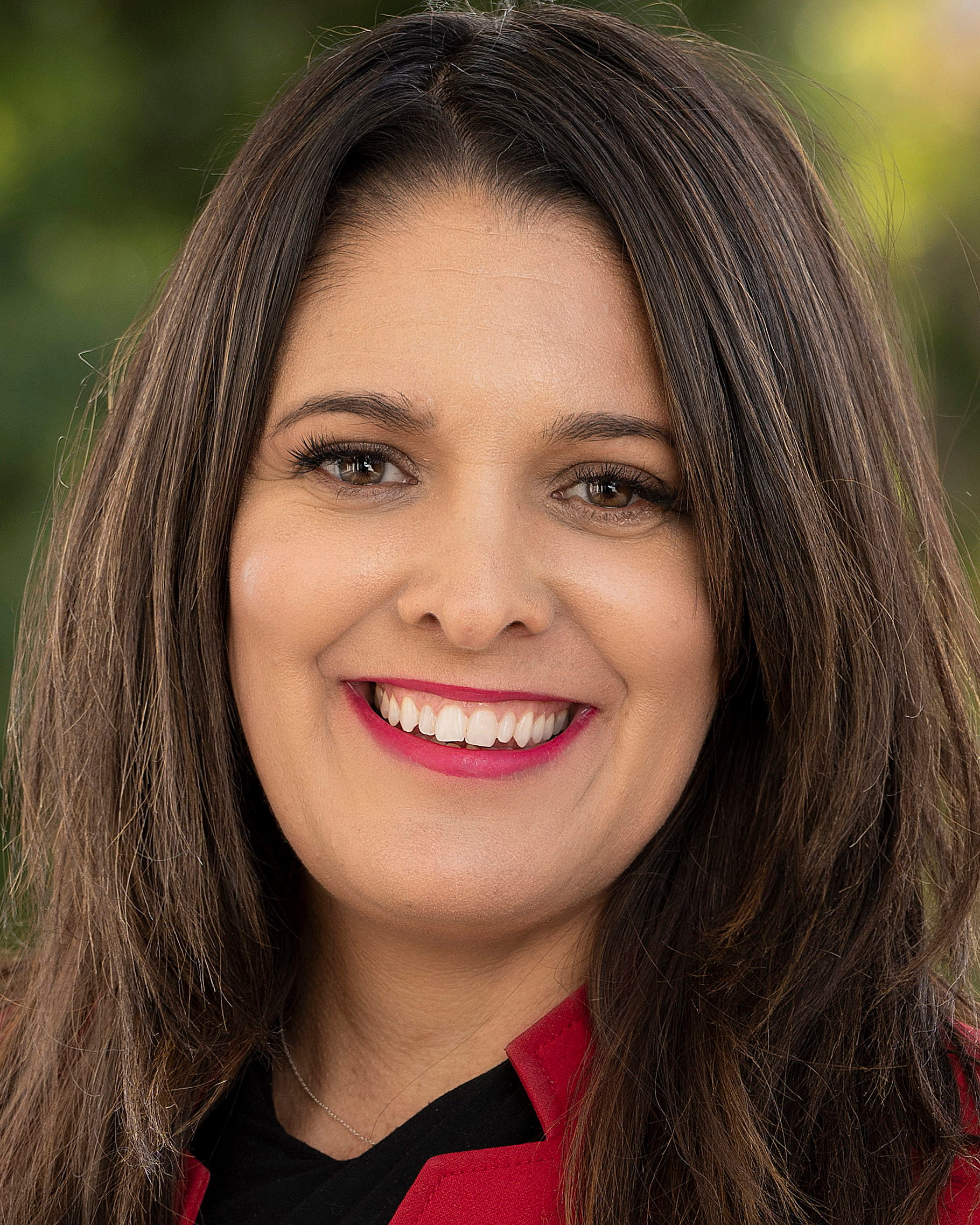

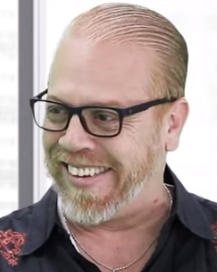
Candidate	Blanca Pacheco	Raul Ortiz Jr.
Party	Democratic	Republican
Popular vote	102,606	61,593
Percentage	62.5%	37.5%
State assemblymember before election
Blanca Pacheco
Democratic
State assemblymember after election
Blanca Pacheco
Democratic

=== Candidates ===
- Raul Ortiz Jr. (Republican), pest control manager and runner-up for this district in 2022
- Blanca Pacheco (Democratic), incumbent state assemblymember

=== Endorsements ===
Raul Ortiz Jr. (R)

Political parties

- California Republican Party
Blanca Pacheco (D)

Political parties

- California Democratic Party

=== Results ===
2024 California's 64th State Assembly district election
Primary election
Party	Candidate	Votes	%
Democratic	Blanca Pacheco (incumbent)	36,075	58.3
Republican	Raul Ortiz Jr.	25,775	41.7
Total votes		61,850	100.0
General election
Democratic	Blanca Pacheco (incumbent)	102,606	62.5
Republican	Raul Ortiz Jr.	61,593	37.5
Total votes		164,199	100.0
Democratic hold			

== District 65 ==
2024 California's 65th State Assembly district election
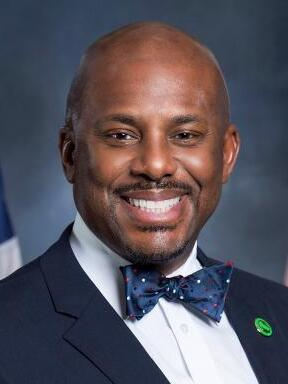

Candidate	Mike Gipson	Lydia Gutierrez
Party	Democratic	Republican
Popular vote	92,246	37,946
Percentage	70.9%	29.1%
State assemblymember before election
Mike Gipson
Democratic
State assemblymember after election
Mike Gipson
Democratic

=== Candidates ===
- Mike Gipson (Democratic), incumbent state assemblymember
- Lydia Gutierrez (Republican), former Coastal San Pedro neighborhood councilor and perennial candidate (write-in)

=== Endorsements ===
Mike Gipson (D)

Political parties

- California Democratic Party

Labor unions

- AFSCME California

Newspapers

- Los Angeles Sentinel

=== Results ===
2024 California's 65th State Assembly district election
Primary election
Party	Candidate	Votes	%
Democratic	Mike Gipson (incumbent)	38,702	99.6
Republican	Lydia Gutierrez (write-in)	152	0.4
Total votes		38,854	100.0
General election
Democratic	Mike Gipson (incumbent)	92,246	70.9
Republican	Lydia Gutierrez	37,946	29.1
Total votes		130,192	100.0
Democratic hold			

== District 66 ==
2024 California's 66th State Assembly district election
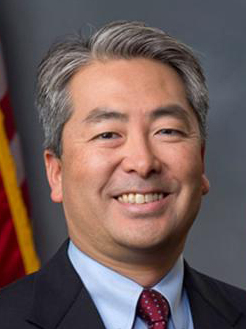

Candidate	Al Muratsuchi	George Barks
Party	Democratic	Republican
Popular vote	131,680	86,986
Percentage	60.2%	39.8%
State assemblymember before election
Al Muratsuchi
Democratic
State assemblymember after election
Al Muratsuchi
Democratic

=== Candidates ===
- George Barks (Republican), former Hermosa Beach city councilor (1975–1985) and runner-up for this district in 2022
- Al Muratsuchi (Democratic), incumbent state assemblymember

=== Endorsements ===
George Barks (R)

Political parties

- California Republican Party
Al Muratsuchi (D)

Political parties

- California Democratic Party

=== Results ===
2024 California's 66th State Assembly district election
Primary election
Party	Candidate	Votes	%
Democratic	Al Muratsuchi (incumbent)	67,838	59.1
Republican	George Barks	46,910	40.9
Total votes		114,748	100.0
General election
Democratic	Al Muratsuchi (incumbent)	131,680	60.2
Republican	George Barks	86,986	39.8
Total votes		218,666	100.0
Democratic hold			

== District 67 ==
2024 California's 67th State Assembly district election
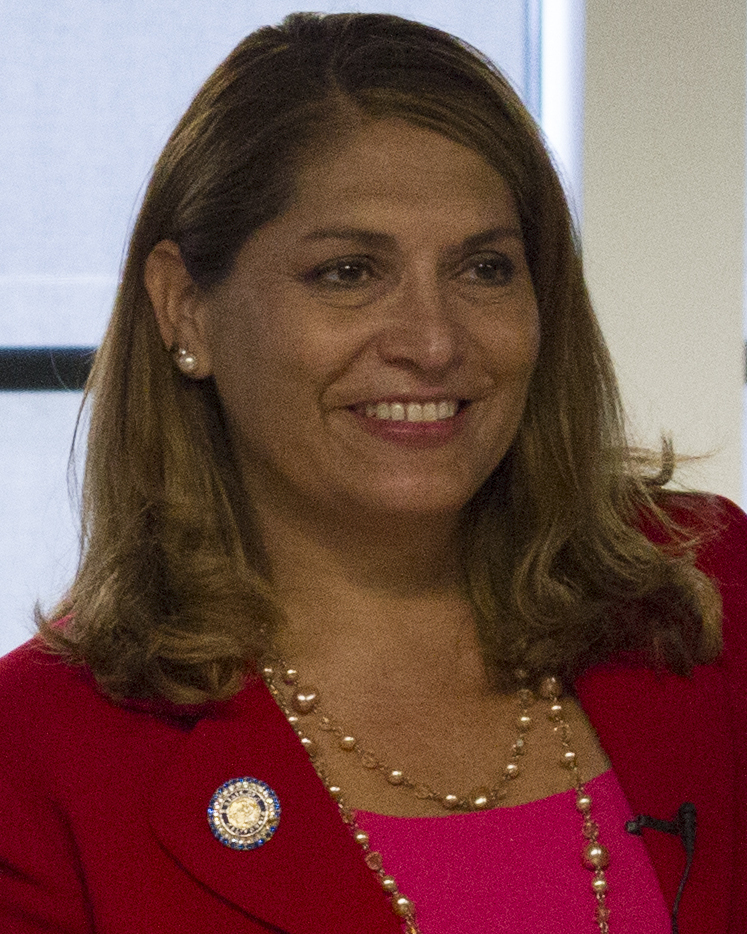

Candidate	Sharon Quirk-Silva	Elizabeth Culver
Party	Democratic	Republican
Popular vote	93,701	71,161
Percentage	56.8%	43.2%
State assemblymember before election
Sharon Quirk-Silva
Democratic
State assemblymember after election
Sharon Quirk-Silva
Democratic

=== Candidates ===
- Elizabeth Culver (Republican), retired entrepreneur
- Jacob Woo Ho Lee (no party preference), pastor
- Sharon Quirk-Silva (Democratic), incumbent state assemblymember

=== Endorsements ===
Sharon Quirk-Silva (D)

Political parties

- California Democratic Party

Labor unions

- AFSCME California

=== Results ===
2024 California's 67th State Assembly district election
Primary election
Party	Candidate	Votes	%
Democratic	Sharon Quirk-Silva (incumbent)	35,828	52.4
Republican	Elizabeth Culver	28,010	41.0
No party preference	Jacob Woo Ho Lee	4,516	6.6
Total votes		68,354	100.0
General election
Democratic	Sharon Quirk-Silva (incumbent)	93,701	56.8
Republican	Elizabeth Culver	71,161	43.2
Total votes		164,862	100.0
Democratic hold			

== District 68 ==
2024 California's 68th State Assembly district election
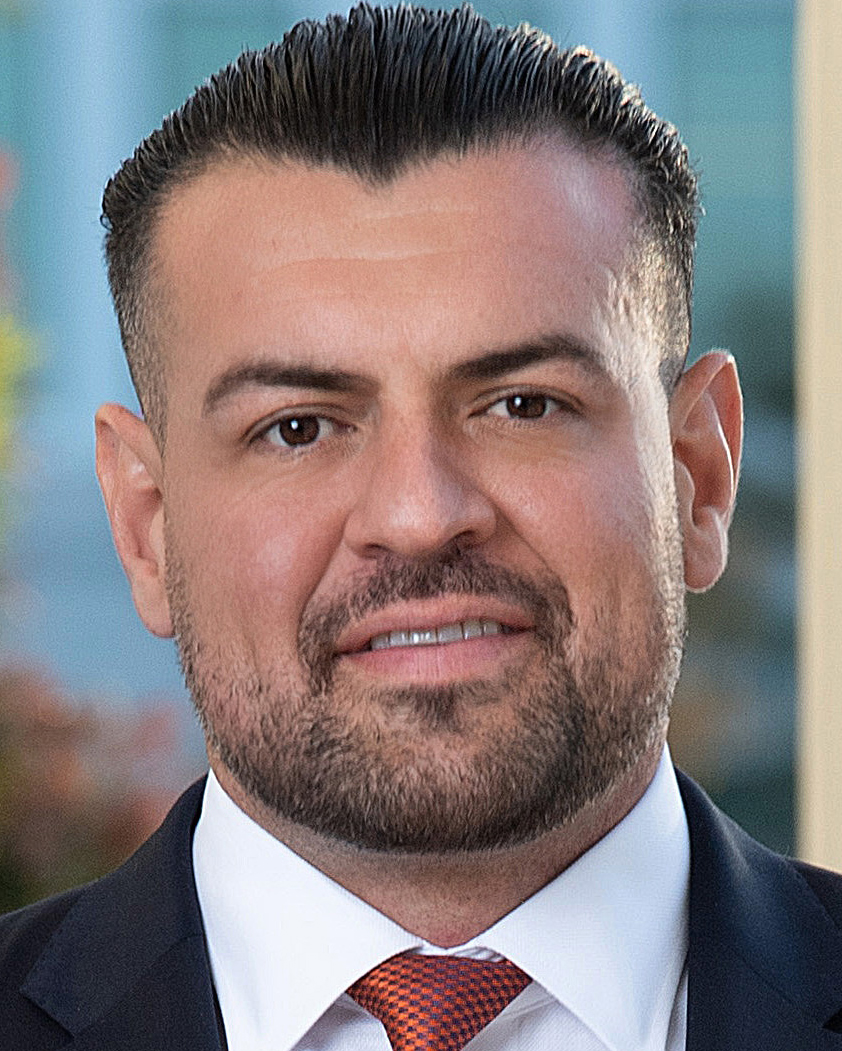

Candidate	Avelino Valencia	Mike Tardif
Party	Democratic	Republican
Popular vote	84,259	47,975
Percentage	63.7%	36.3%
State assemblymember before election
Avelino Valencia
Democratic
State assemblymember after election
Avelino Valencia
Democratic

=== Candidates ===
- Mike Tardif (Republican), retired businessman and runner-up for this district in 2022
- Avelino Valencia (Democratic), incumbent state assemblymember

=== Endorsements ===
Avelino Valencia (D)

Political parties

- California Democratic Party

Labor unions

- AFSCME California

=== Results ===
2024 California's 68th State Assembly district election
Primary election
Party	Candidate	Votes	%
Democratic	Avelino Valencia (incumbent)	28,985	58.8
Republican	Mike Tardif	20,320	41.2
Total votes		49,305	100.0
General election
Democratic	Avelino Valencia (incumbent)	84,259	63.7
Republican	Mike Tardif	47,975	36.3
Total votes		132,234	100.0
Democratic hold			

== District 69 ==
2024 California's 69th State Assembly district election
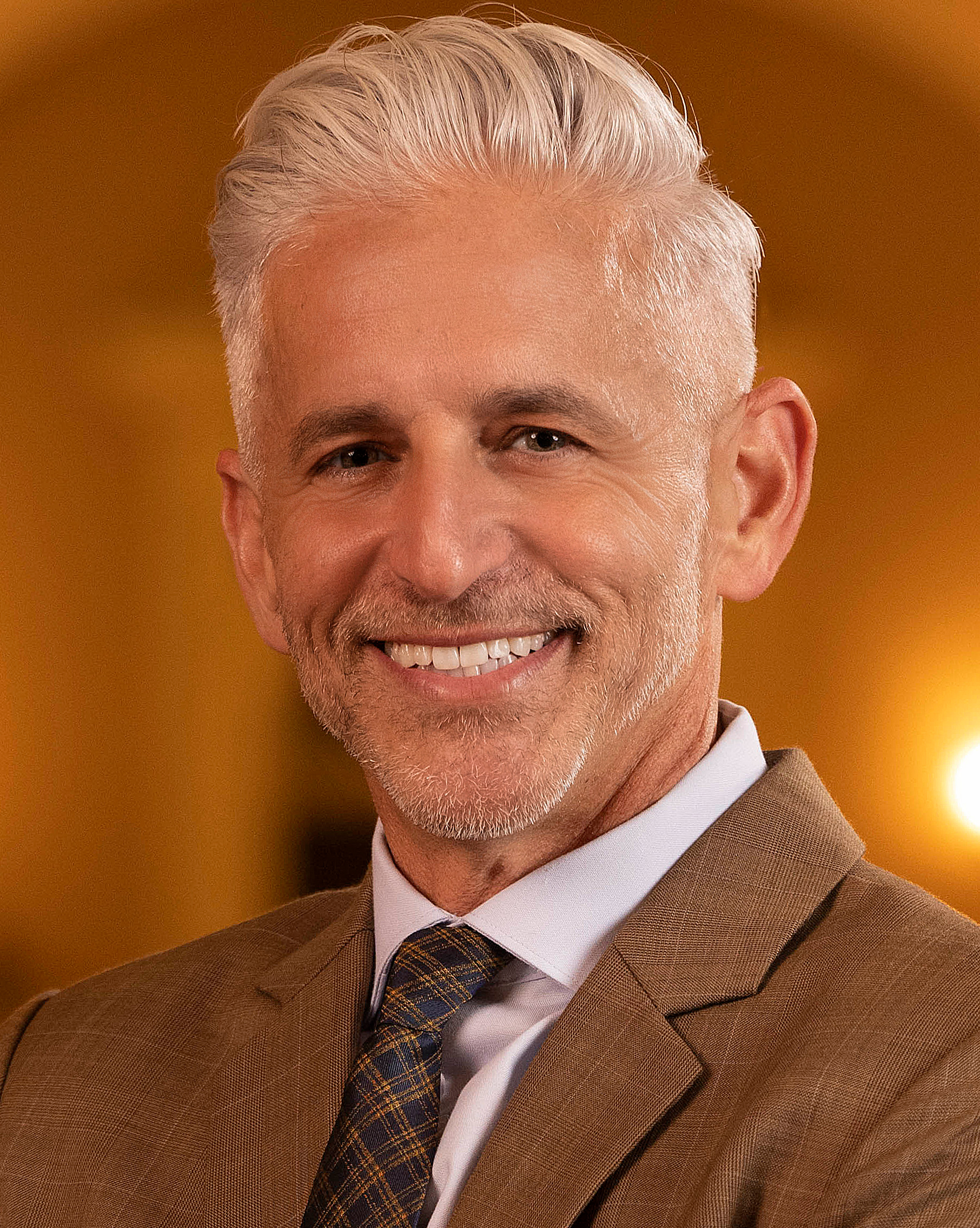

Candidate	Josh Lowenthal	Joshua Rodriguez
Party	Democratic	Republican
Popular vote	120,340	55,595
Percentage	68.4%	31.6%
State assemblymember before election
Josh Lowenthal
Democratic
State assemblymember after election
Josh Lowenthal
Democratic

=== Candidates ===
- Josh Lowenthal (Democratic), incumbent state assemblymember
- Joshua Rodriguez (Republican), LAPD officer

=== Endorsements ===
Josh Lowenthal (D)

Political parties

- California Democratic Party

Labor unions

- AFSCME California
Joshua Rodriguez (R)

Political parties

- California Republican Party

=== Results ===
2024 California's 69th State Assembly district election
Primary election
Party	Candidate	Votes	%
Democratic	Josh Lowenthal (incumbent)	54,782	68.0
Republican	Joshua Rodriguez	25,755	32.0
Total votes		80,537	100.0
General election
Democratic	Josh Lowenthal (incumbent)	120,340	68.4
Republican	Joshua Rodriguez	55,595	31.6
Total votes		175,935	100.0
Democratic hold			

== District 70 ==
2024 California's 70th State Assembly district election
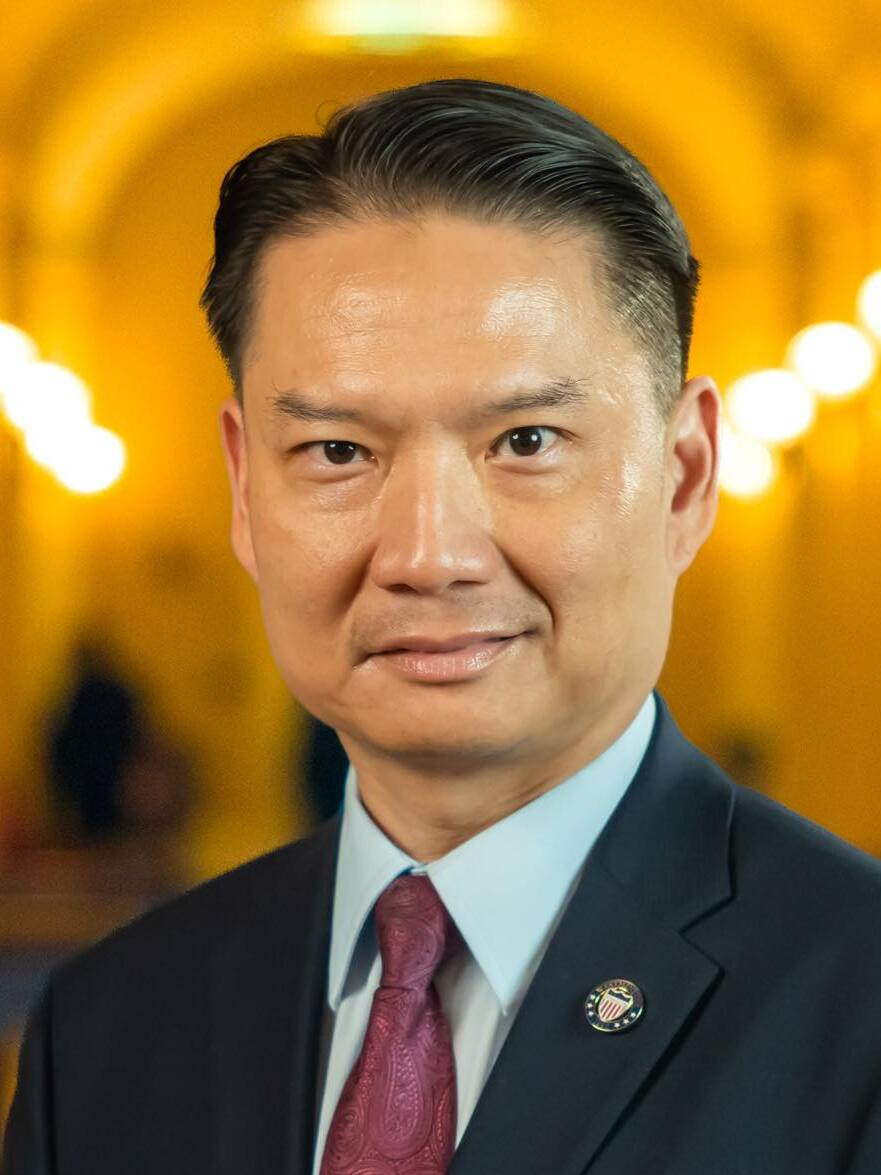

Candidate	Tri Ta	Jimmy Pham
Party	Republican	Democratic
Popular vote	96,083	79,587
Percentage	54.7%	45.3%
State assemblymember before election
Tri Ta
Republican
State assemblymember after election
Tri Ta
Republican

=== Candidates ===
- Jimmy Pham (Democratic), immigration attorney and vice chair of the Westminster Traffic Commission
- Tri Ta (Republican), incumbent state assemblymember

=== Endorsements ===
Jimmy Pham (D)

Political parties

- California Democratic Party
Tri Ta (R)

Labor unions

- Southwest Regional Council of Carpenters

Political parties

- California Republican Party

=== Results ===
2024 California's 70th State Assembly district election
Primary election
Party	Candidate	Votes	%
Republican	Tri Ta (incumbent)	46,752	59.5
Democratic	Jimmy D. Pham	31,812	40.5
Total votes		78,564	100.0
General election
Republican	Tri Ta (incumbent)	96,083	54.7
Democratic	Jimmy D. Pham	79,587	45.3
Total votes		175,670	100.0
Republican hold			

== District 71 ==
2024 California's 71st State Assembly district election
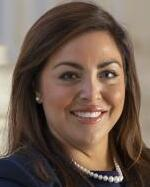

Candidate	Kate Sanchez	Gary Kephart
Party	Republican	Democratic
Popular vote	147,932	92,424
Percentage	61.5%	38.5%
State assemblymember before election
Kate Sanchez
Republican
State assemblymember after election
Kate Sanchez
Republican

=== Candidates ===
- Gary Kephart (Democratic), software engineer
- Babar Khan (Peace and Freedom), businessman
- Kate Sanchez (Republican), incumbent state assemblymember

=== Endorsements ===
Gary Kephart (D)

Political parties

- California Democratic Party
Kate Sanchez (R)

Labor unions

- California Professional Firefighters
- Southwest Regional Council of Carpenters

Political parties

- California Republican Party

=== Results ===
2024 California's 71st State Assembly district election
Primary election
Party	Candidate	Votes	%
Republican	Kate Sanchez (incumbent)	71,079	63.1
Democratic	Gary Kephart	38,610	34.3
Peace and Freedom	Babar Khan	2,912	2.6
Total votes		112,601	100.0
General election
Republican	Kate Sanchez (incumbent)	147,932	61.5
Democratic	Gary Kephart	92,424	38.5
Total votes		240,356	100.0
Republican hold			

== District 72 ==
2024 California's 72nd State Assembly district election
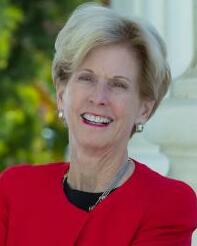

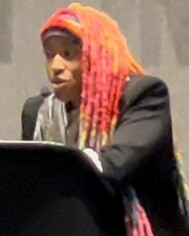
Candidate	Diane Dixon	Dom Jones
Party	Republican	Democratic
Popular vote	157,278	107,251
Percentage	59.5%	40.5%
State assemblymember before election
Diane Dixon
Republican
State assemblymember after election
Diane Dixon
Republican

=== Candidates ===
- Diane Dixon (Republican), incumbent state assemblymember
- Dom Jones (Democratic), businesswoman and contestant on The Amazing Race 34

=== Endorsements ===
Diane Dixon (R)

Labor unions

- Southwest Regional Council of Carpenters

Political parties

- California Republican Party
Dom Jones (D)

Political parties

- California Democratic Party

=== Results ===
2024 California's 72nd State Assembly district election
Primary election
Party	Candidate	Votes	%
Republican	Diane Dixon (incumbent)	87,904	60.9
Democratic	Dom Jones	56,374	39.1
Total votes		144,278	100.0
General election
Republican	Diane Dixon (incumbent)	157,278	59.5
Democratic	Dom Jones	107,251	40.5
Total votes		264,529	100.0
Republican hold			

== District 73 ==
2024 California's 73rd State Assembly district election
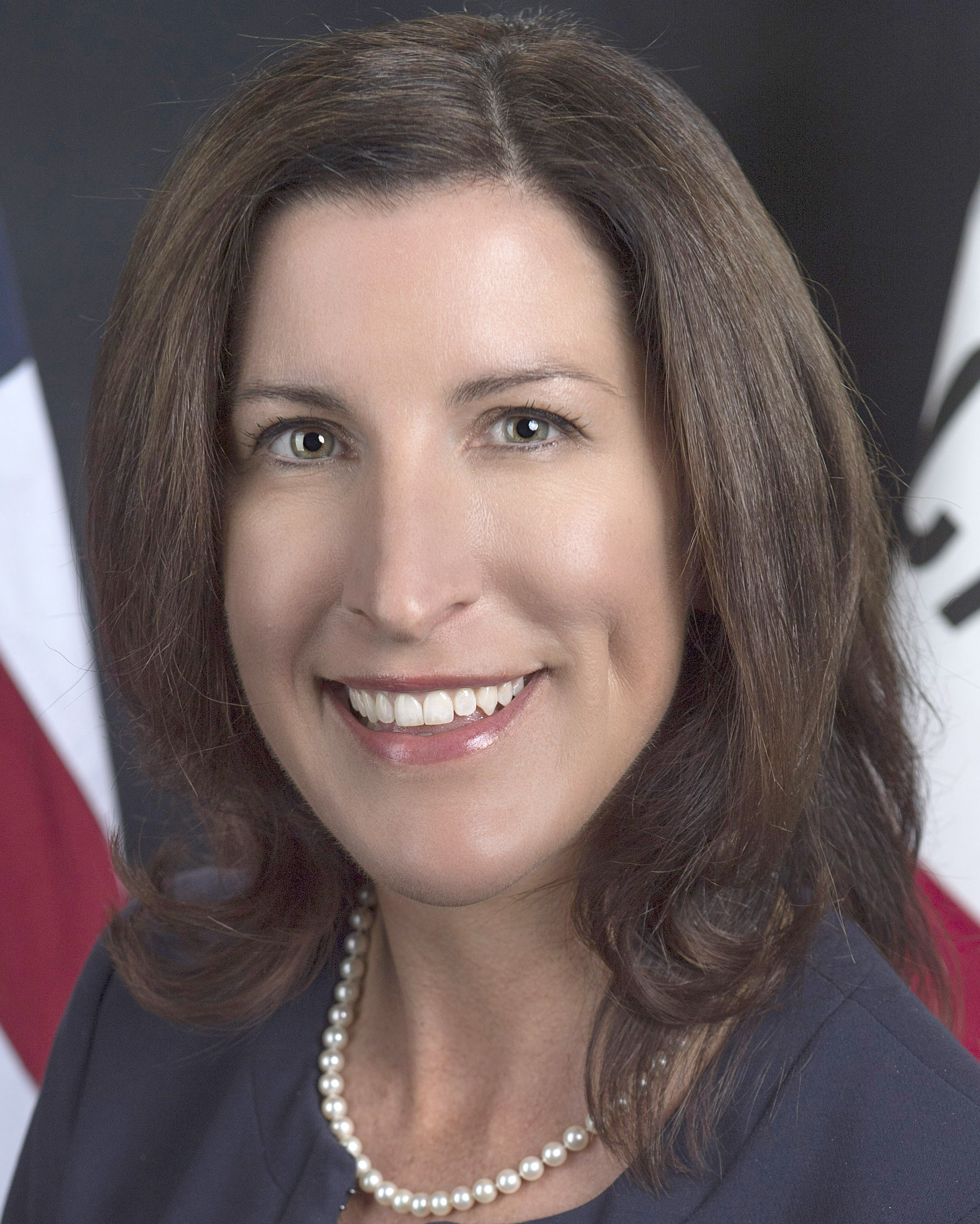

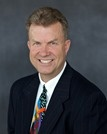
Candidate	Cottie Petrie-Norris	Scotty Peotter
Party	Democratic	Republican
Popular vote	108,445	82,365
Percentage	56.8%	43.2%
State assemblymember before election
Cottie Petrie-Norris
Democratic
State assemblymember after election
Cottie Petrie-Norris
Democratic

=== Candidates ===
- Hengameh Abraham (Republican), Iranian-American Engagement Director for the Orange County Republican Party
- Scotty Peotter (Republican), former Newport Beach city councilor (2014–2018)
- Cottie Petrie-Norris (Democratic), incumbent state assemblymember

=== Endorsements ===
Cottie Petrie-Norris (D)

Political parties

- California Democratic Party

Labor unions

- AFSCME California

=== Results ===
2024 California's 73rd State Assembly district election
Primary election
Party	Candidate	Votes	%
Democratic	Cottie Petrie-Norris (incumbent)	45,950	56.1
Republican	Scotty Peotter	24,999	30.5
Republican	Hengameh Abraham	11,019	13.4
Total votes		81,968	100.0
General election
Democratic	Cottie Petrie-Norris (incumbent)	108,445	56.8
Republican	Scotty Peotter	82,365	43.2
Total votes		190,810	100.0
Democratic hold			

== District 74 ==
2024 California's 74th State Assembly district election
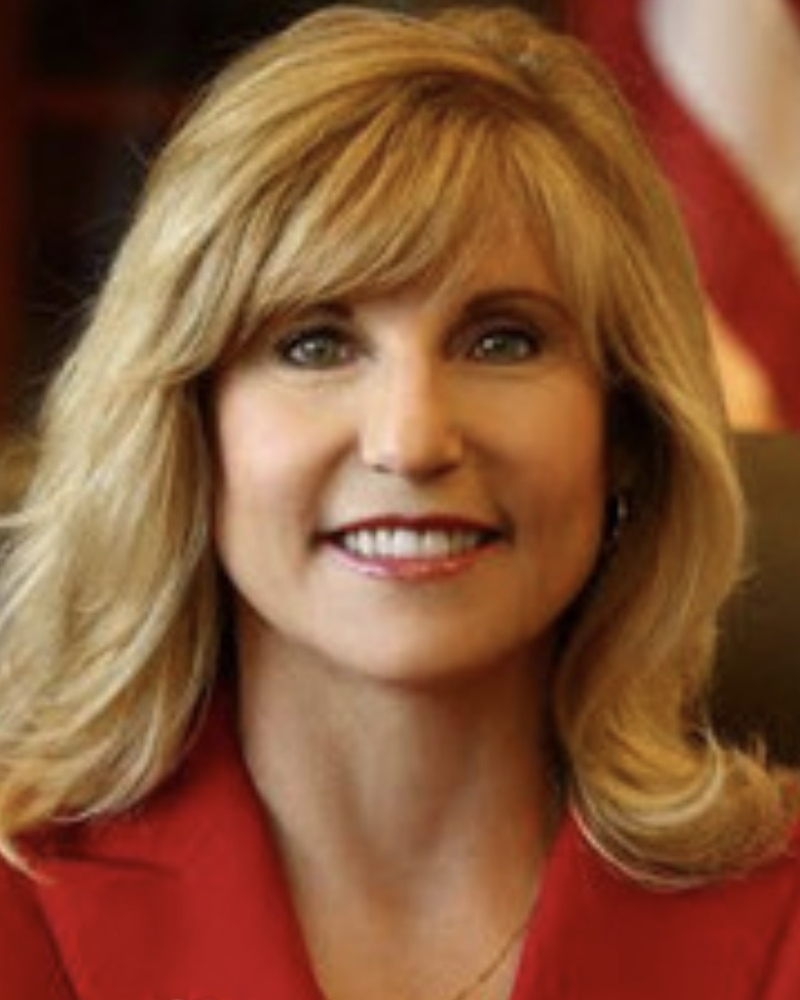

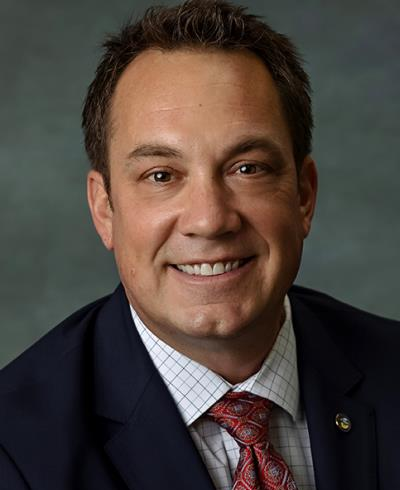
Candidate	Laurie Davies	Chris Duncan
Party	Republican	Democratic
Popular vote	117,208	113,338
Percentage	50.8%	49.2%
State assemblymember before election
Laurie Davies
Republican
State assemblymember after election
Laurie Davies
Republican

=== Candidates ===
- Laurie Davies (Republican), incumbent state assemblymember
- Chris Duncan (Democratic), San Clemente city councilor and runner-up for this district in 2022

=== Endorsements ===
Laurie Davies (R)

Labor unions

- California Professional Firefighters
- Southwest Regional Council of Carpenters

Newspapers

- Orange County Register

Political parties

- California Republican Party
Chris Duncan (D)

Political parties

- California Democratic Party
- San Diego County Democratic Party

Labor unions

- AFSCME California
- California Faculty Association

=== Fundraising ===
Campaign finance reports as of October 19, 2024
Candidate	Raised	Spent	Cash on hand
Laurie Davies (R)	$1,773,129	$2,174,592	$91,967
Chris Duncan (D)	$3,835,800	$4,072,336	$51,107
Source: Secretary of State of California

=== Results ===
2024 California's 74th State Assembly district election
Primary election
Party	Candidate	Votes	%
Republican	Laurie Davies (incumbent)	64,187	55.4
Democratic	Chris Duncan	51,731	44.6
Total votes		115,918	100.0
General election
Republican	Laurie Davies (incumbent)	117,208	50.8
Democratic	Chris Duncan	113,338	49.2
Total votes		230,546	100.0
Republican hold			

== District 75 ==
2024 California's 75th State Assembly district election
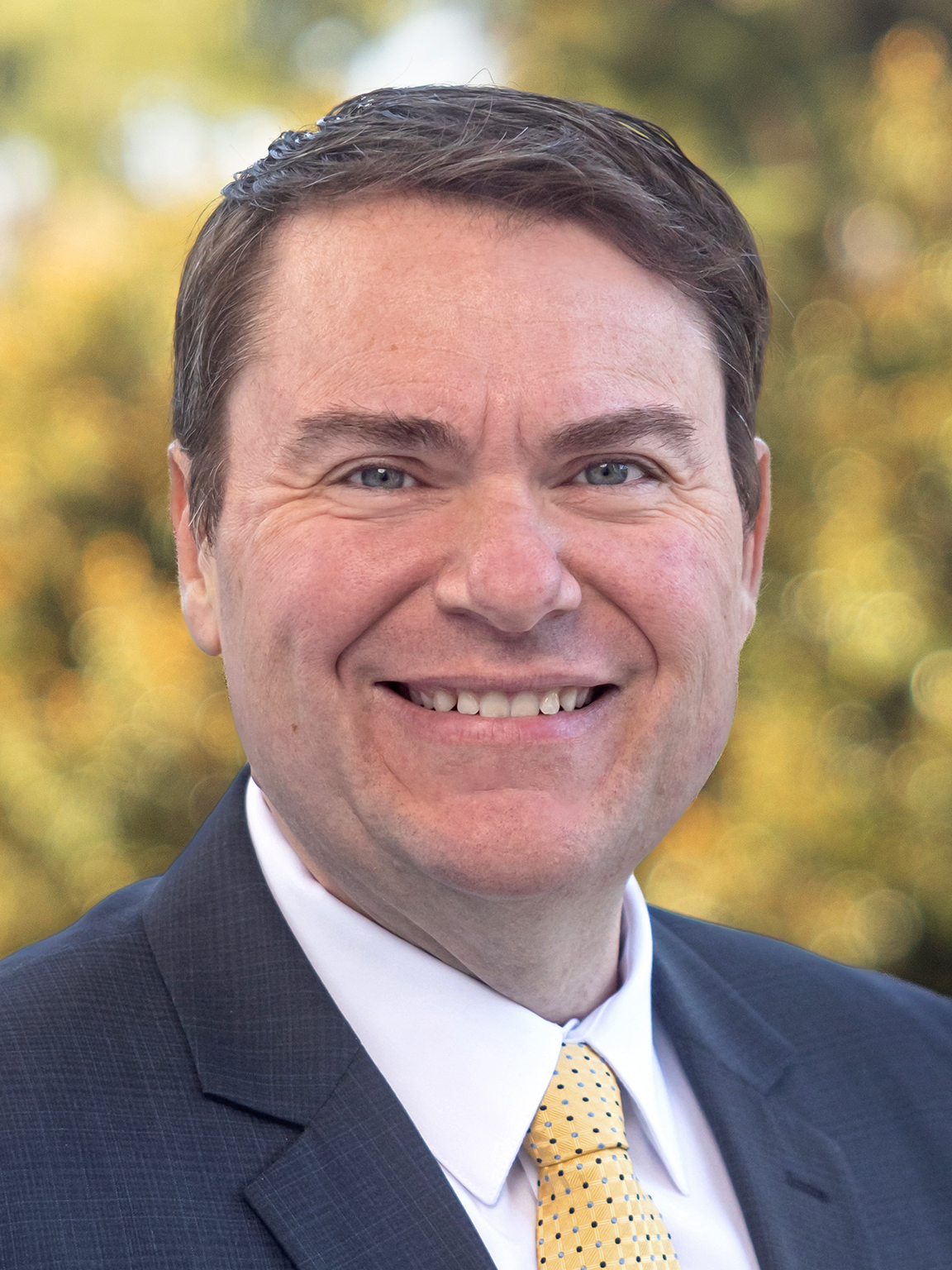

Candidate	Carl DeMaio	Andrew Hayes
Party	Republican	Republican
Popular vote	121,167	91,337
Percentage	57.0%	43.0%
State assemblymember before election
Marie Waldron
Republican
State assemblymember after election
Carl DeMaio
Republican

The incumbent was Republican Marie Waldron of Valley Center, who was term-limited.

=== Candidates ===
- Carl DeMaio (Republican), former San Diego city councilor (2008–2012), nominee for mayor of San Diego in 2012, runner-up for California's 52nd congressional district in 2014, and candidate for the 50th congressional district in 2020
- Christie Dougherty (Democratic), special education teacher
- Jack Fernandes (Republican), biotech entrepreneur
- Joy Frew (Democratic), retired revenue officer
- Andrew Hayes (Republican), president of the Lakeside Union School Board and district director for state senator Brian Jones
- Kevin Juza (Democratic), business owner

=== Endorsements ===
Carl DeMaio (R)

Organizations

- California College Republicans
- Howard Jarvis Taxpayers Association
- Latino American Political Association
Kevin Juza (D)

Political parties

- California Democratic Party
- San Diego County Democratic Party
Andrew Hayes (R)

Labor unions

- California Professional Firefighters
- Southwest Regional Council of Carpenters

Political parties

- California Republican Party

=== Results ===
2024 California's 75th State Assembly district election
Primary election
Party	Candidate	Votes	%
Republican	Carl DeMaio	54,350	42.9
Republican	Andrew Hayes	23,664	18.7
Democratic	Kevin Juza	23,010	18.2
Democratic	Christie Dougherty	12,675	10.0
Democratic	Joy Frew	9,362	7.4
Republican	Jack Fernandes	3,596	2.8
Total votes		126,657	100.0
General election
Republican	Carl DeMaio	121,167	57.0
Republican	Andrew Hayes	91,337	43.0
Total votes		212,504	100.0
Republican hold			

== District 76 ==
2024 California's 76th State Assembly district election
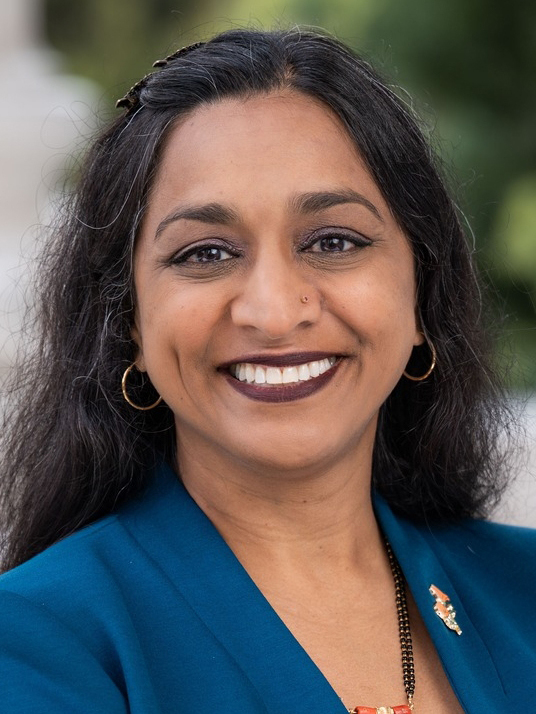

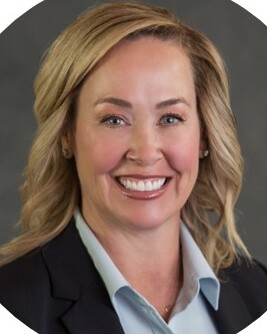
Candidate	Darshana Patel	Kristie Bruce-Lane
Party	Democratic	Republican
Popular vote	113,242	96,358
Percentage	54.0%	46.0%
State assemblymember before election
Brian Maienschein
Democratic
State assemblymember after election
Darshana Patel
Democratic

The incumbent was Democrat Brian Maienschein, who was term-limited and ran for San Diego City Attorney.

=== Candidates ===
- Kristie Bruce-Lane (Republican), former member of the Olivenhain Municipal Water District Board of Directors and runner-up for this district in 2022
- Darshana Patel (Democratic), president of the Poway Unified School Board
- Joseph Rocha (Democratic), attorney and runner-up for SD-40 in 2022

=== Endorsements ===
Kristie Bruce-Lane (R)

Political parties

- California Republican Party
Darshana Patel (D)

Political parties

- California Democratic Party
- San Diego County Democratic Party

Labor unions

- California Faculty Association (co-endorsement with Rocha)
Joseph Rocha (D)

Labor unions

- AFSCME California
- California Faculty Association (co-endorsement with Patel)

=== Fundraising ===
Campaign finance reports as of October 19, 2024
Candidate	Raised	Spent	Cash on hand
Darshana Patel (D)	$4,150,591	$4,039,676	$473,410
Kristie Bruce-Lane (R)	$1,325,207	$1,455,129	$85,835
Source: Secretary of State of California

=== Results ===
2024 California's 76th State Assembly district election
Primary election
Party	Candidate	Votes	%
Republican	Kristie Bruce-Lane	49,316	49.5
Democratic	Darshana Patel	34,066	34.2
Democratic	Joseph Rocha	16,312	16.4
Total votes		99,694	100.0
General election
Democratic	Darshana Patel	113,242	54.0
Republican	Kristie Bruce-Lane	96,358	46.0
Total votes		209,600	100.0
Democratic hold			

== District 77 ==
2024 California's 77th State Assembly district election
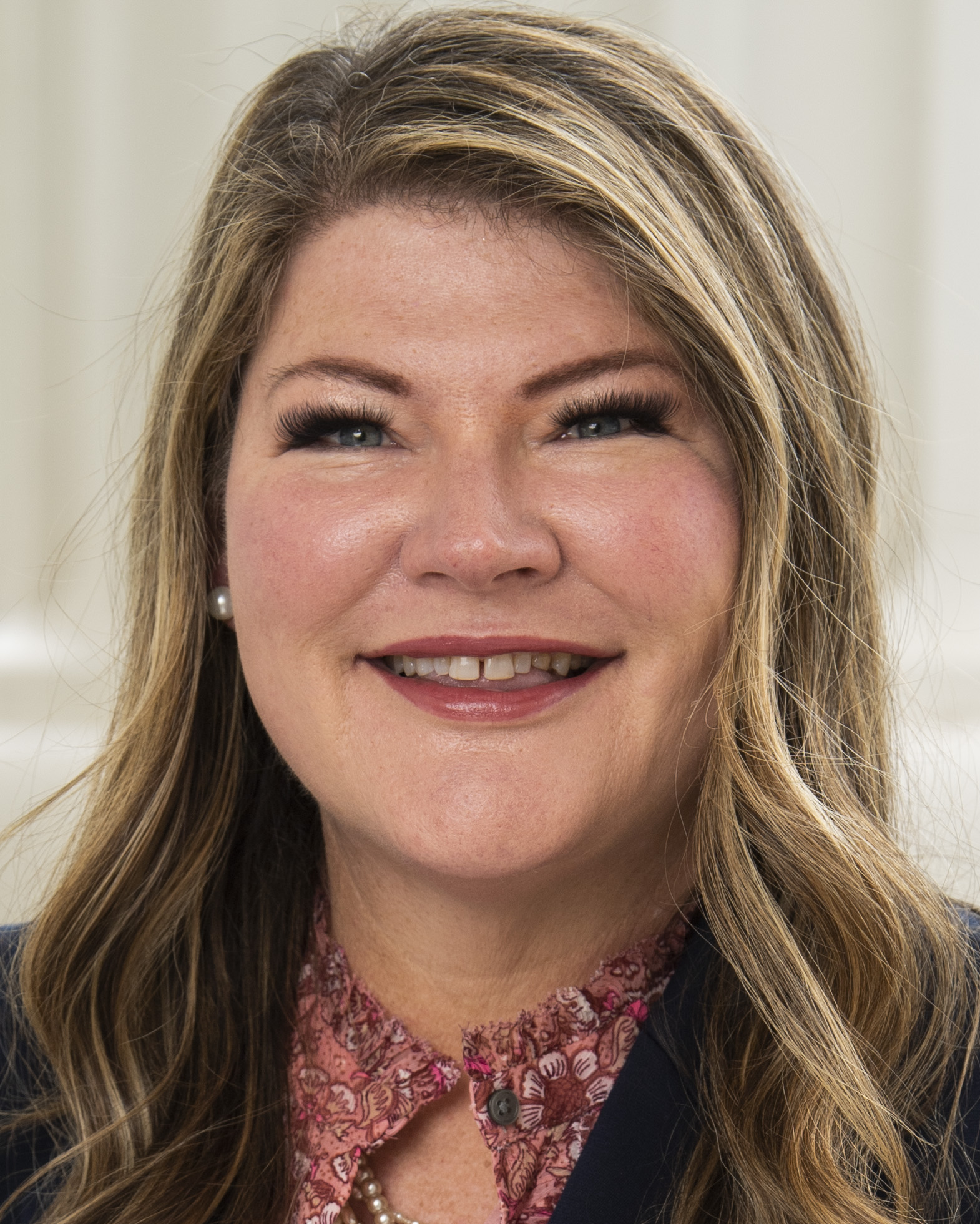

Candidate	Tasha Boerner	James Browne
Party	Democratic	Republican
Popular vote	154,202	100,954
Percentage	60.4%	39.6%
State assemblymember before election
Tasha Boerner
Democratic
State assemblymember after election
Tasha Boerner
Democratic

=== Candidates ===
- Tasha Boerner (Democratic), incumbent state assemblymember
- James Browne (Republican), financial advisor
- Henny Kupferstein (Democratic), autism researcher

=== Endorsements ===
Tasha Boerner (D)

Political parties

- California Democratic Party
- San Diego County Democratic Party

Labor unions

- AFSCME California

=== Results ===
2024 California's 77th State Assembly district election
Primary election
Party	Candidate	Votes	%
Democratic	Tasha Boerner (incumbent)	72,606	56.9
Republican	James Browne	49,017	38.4
Democratic	Henny Kupferstein	5,977	4.7
Total votes		127,600	100.0
General election
Democratic	Tasha Boerner (incumbent)	154,202	60.4
Republican	James Browne	100,954	39.6
Total votes		255,156	100.0
Democratic hold			

== District 78 ==
2024 California's 78th State Assembly district election
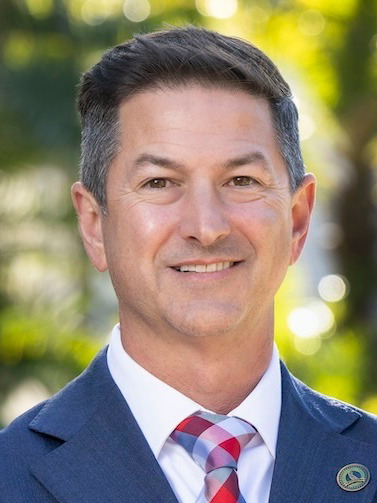
Candidate	Chris Ward
Party	Democratic
Popular vote	175,178
Percentage	100.0%
State assemblymember before election
Chris Ward
Democratic
State assemblymember after election
Chris Ward
Democratic

=== Candidates ===
- Chris Ward (Democratic), incumbent state assemblymember

=== Endorsements ===
Chris Ward (D)

Political parties

- California Democratic Party
- San Diego County Democratic Party

Labor unions

- AFSCME California

=== Results ===
2024 California's 78th State Assembly district election
Primary election
Party	Candidate	Votes	%
Democratic	Chris Ward (incumbent)	79,090	100.0
Total votes		79,090	100.0
General election
Democratic	Chris Ward (incumbent)	175,178	100.0
Total votes		175,178	100.0
Democratic hold			

== District 79 ==
2024 California's 79th State Assembly district election
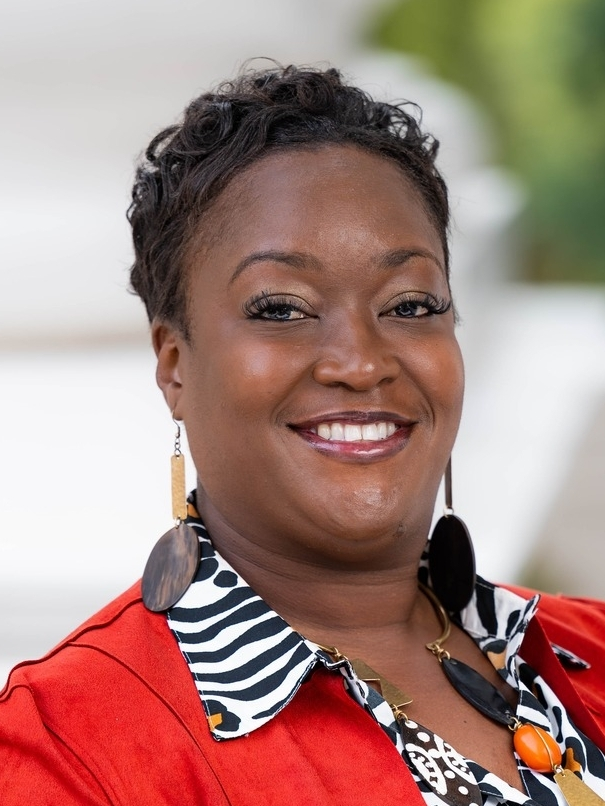

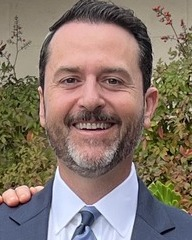
Candidate	LaShae Sharp-Collins	Colin Parent
Party	Democratic	Democratic
Popular vote	79,215	67,390
Percentage	54.0%	46.0%
State assemblymember before election
Akilah Weber
Democratic
State assemblymember after election
LaShae Sharp-Collins
Democratic

The incumbent was Democrat Akilah Weber of La Mesa, who retired to run for state senate.

=== Candidates ===
- Colin Parent (Democratic), La Mesa city councilor
- LaShae Sharp-Collins (Democratic), San Diego County Office of Education Community Engagement Specialist and former district director for then-state assemblywoman Shirley Weber
- Racquel Vasquez (Democratic), mayor of Lemon Grove

=== Endorsements ===
Colin Parent (D)

State assemblymembers

- David Alvarez, AD-80 (2022–present)
- Tasha Boerner, AD-77 (2018–present)
- Chris Ward, AD-79 (2020–present)
LaShae Sharp-Collins (D)

Political parties

- California Democratic Party
- San Diego County Democratic Party

Labor unions

- California Faculty Association

=== Results ===
2024 California's 79th State Assembly district election
Primary election
Party	Candidate	Votes	%
Democratic	Colin Parent	21,992	39.6
Democratic	LaShae Sharp-Collins	16,854	30.3
Democratic	Racquel Vasquez	16,733	30.1
Total votes		55,579	100.0
General election
Democratic	LaShae Sharp-Collins	79,215	54.0
Democratic	Colin Parent	67,390	46.0
Total votes		146,605	100.0
Democratic hold			

== District 80 ==
2024 California's 80th State Assembly district election
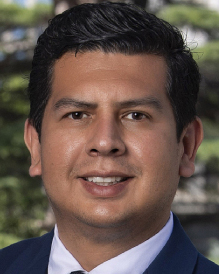

Candidate	David Alvarez	Michael Williams
Party	Democratic	Republican
Popular vote	113,768	72,836
Percentage	61.0%	39.0%
State assemblymember before election
David Alvarez
Democratic
State assemblymember after election
David Alvarez
Democratic

=== Candidates ===
- David Alvarez (Democratic), incumbent state assemblymember
- Michael Williams (Republican), former FBI intelligence analyst

=== Endorsements ===
David Alzarez (D)

Political parties

- California Democratic Party
- San Diego County Democratic Party

Labor unions

- AFSCME California

=== Results ===
2024 California's 80th State Assembly district election
Primary election
Party	Candidate	Votes	%
Democratic	David Alvarez (incumbent)	41,070	59.3
Republican	Michael W. Williams	28,220	40.7
Total votes		69,290	100.0
General election
Democratic	David Alvarez (incumbent)	113,768	61.0
Republican	Michael W. Williams	72,836	39.0
Total votes		186,604	100.0
Democratic hold			

== See also ==
- 2024 California elections
- 2024 California State Senate election
