= California's 12th senatorial district =

American legislative district

California's 12th State Senate district
Current senator
Shannon Grove; R–Bakersfield
- Population (2020) • Voting age • Citizen voting age: 939,354; 703,636; 618,054
- Demographics: 48.73% White; 3.53% Black; 33.76% Latino; 7.94% Asian; 0.81% Native American; 0.16% Hawaiian/Pacific Islander; 0.58% other; 4.48% remainder of multiracial
- Registered voters: 555,204
- Registration: 44.90% Republican; 28.49% Democratic; 18.50% No party preference

California's 12th senatorial district is one of 40 California State Senate districts. It is currently represented by Republican Shannon Grove of Bakersfield.

== District profile ==
=== Since 2022 ===
New district boundaries drawn by the 2020 California Citizens Redistricting Commission went into effect for the 2022 elections. The 12th State Senate district now encompasses the southeastern Central Valley and the northwestern corner of the Mojave Desert; and it includes portions of Fresno County, Kern, and Tulare Counties, including the following cities:

- California City
- Clovis
- Exeter
- Maricopa
- Ridgecrest
- Taft
- Tehachapi
- Bakersfield (part)
- Fresno (part)
- Shafter (part)
- Tulare (part)
- Visalia (part)

The district also includes the Tule River Indian Reservation, Cold Springs Rancheria, Big Sandy Rancheria, and Table Mountain Rancheria.

Tourism, agriculture, and ranching are important in the district. The neighboring districts 14 and 16 were specifically drawn to allow Latino voters to elect state senators of their choice in order to comply with the Voting Rights Act, which affected the western border of District 12.

The district's racial/ethnic demographics (based on the 2020 census) are as follows:

Senate District 12
Population	Latino	White	Black	American Indian	Asian	Hawaiian or Pacific Islander	Other	Multiracial
939,354	317,166	457,719	33,143	7,634	74,614	1,519	5,435	43,124

=== 2012-2022 ===
The district included the Salinas Valley and a swath of the Central Valley between Modesto and Fresno. The rural district was primarily agricultural and heavily Latino.

Fresno County – 14.3%

- Coalinga
- Firebaugh
- Fowler
- Huron
- Kerman
- Kingsburg
- Mendota
- San Joaquin

Madera County – 81.1%

- Chowchilla
- Madera

All of Merced County

- Atwater
- Dos Palos
- Gustine
- Livingston
- Los Banos
- Merced

Monterey County – 54.2%

- Gonzales
- Greenfield
- King City
- Salinas
- Soledad

All of San Benito County

- Hollister
- San Juan Bautista

Stanislaus County – 27.6%

- Ceres
- Newman
- Modesto – 11.5%
- Patterson

The district's demographics (based on the 2010 census) were as follows:

Senate District 12
Population	Voting age	Citizen voting age	White	Black	Latino	Asian	Native American	Hawaiian or Pacific Islander	Other	Multiracial
933,222	641,932	438,286	25.68%	3.00%	64.48%	5.12%	0.80%	0.27%	0.25%	0.39%

As of February 18, 2020, the district had 377,188 registered voters, of whom 45.00% were registered as Democrats, 26.35% were registered as Republicans, and 23.22% were registered with no party preference.

== Election results from statewide races ==
Year	Office	Results
2022	Governor	Dahle 67.2 – 32.8%
2022	Senator	Meuser 65.4 – 34.6%
2022	Senator	Meuser 65.4 – 34.6%
2021	Recall	No 53.2 – 46.8%
2021	Governor	Elder 56.5 – 6.1%
2020	President	Biden 58.0 – 39.8%
2018	Governor	Newsom 55.3 – 44.7%
2018	Senator	De Leon 54.3 – 45.7%
2016	President	Clinton 57.3 – 37.1%
2016	Senator	Harris 50.5 – 49.5%
2014	Governor	Brown 54.9 – 45.1%
2012	President	Obama 57.6 – 40.3%
2012	Senator	Feinstein 59.0 – 41.0%
2010	Governor	Brown 51.4 – 42.3%
2010	Senator	Boxer 47.6 – 45.4%
2008	President	Obama 57.9 – 40.3%
2006	Governor	Schwarzenegger 58.0 – 37.3%
2006	Senator	Feinstein 56.8 – 38.2%
2004	President	Bush 51.2 – 47.7%
2004	Senator	Boxer 54.0 – 41.9%
2003	Recall	Yes 56.5 – 43.5%
2003	Governor	Schwarzenegger 46.7 – 29.8%
2002	Governor	Davis 49.2 - 42.3%
2000	President	Bush 54.6 - 41.6%
2000	Senator	Feinstein 47.4 - 45.2%
1998	Governor	Lungren 49.2 - 48.4%
1998	Senator	Fong 51.3 - 44.7%
1996	President	Dole 47.5 - 43.1%
1994	Governor	Wilson 63.7 - 32.2%
1994	Senator	Huffington 53.9 - 37.6%
1992	President	Clinton 39.1 - 38.5%
1992	Senator	Herschensohn 49.5 - 40.8%
1992	Senator	Feinstein 47.3 - 44.5%

== List of senators representing the district ==
Due to redistricting, the 12th district has been moved around different parts of the state. The current iteration resulted from the 2021 redistricting by the California Citizens Redistricting Commission.

Senators	Party	Years served	Counties represented	Notes
John T. Dougherty	Democratic	January 8, 1883 –January 3, 1887	San Francisco	Dougherty and Kelly served together.
Martin Kelly	Democratic	January 8, 1883 – January 3, 1887	San Francisco	Dougherty and Kelly served together.
Augustus Lemuel Chandler	Republican	January 3, 1887 – November 5, 1888	Sutter, Yuba	Died in office from pneumonia.
Vacant		November 5, 1888 – January 7, 1889	Sutter, Yuba	
F. H. Greely	Republican	January 7, 1889 – January 5, 1891	Sutter, Yuba	
Daniel Augustus Ostrom	Democratic	January 5, 1891 – January 7, 1895	Sutter, Yuba	
Daniel Augustus Ostrom	Democratic	January 5, 1891 – January 7, 1895	Sutter, Yolo, Yuba	
John Henry Shine	Republican	January 7, 1895 – January 2, 1899	Mariposa, Merced, Stanislaus, Tuolume	
John Curtin	Democratic	January 2, 1899 – January 4, 1915	Mariposa, Merced, Stanislaus, Tuolume	
John Curtin	Democratic	January 2, 1899 – January 4, 1915	Madera, Mariposa, Merced, Stanislaus, Tuolume	
Lafayette Jackson Maddux	Democratic	January 4, 1915 – January 6, 1919	Alpine, Calaveras, Madera, Mariposa, Merced, Mono, Stanislaus, Tuolume	
Lewis Lincoln Dennett	Republican	January 6, 1919 – January 3, 1927	Alpine, Calaveras, Madera, Mariposa, Merced, Mono, Stanislaus, Tuolume	
James Charles Garrison	Republican	January 3, 1927 – January 5, 1931	Alpine, Calaveras, Madera, Mariposa, Merced, Mono, Stanislaus, Tuolume	
Herbert W. Slater	Democratic	January 5, 1931 – August 13, 1947	Sonoma	Died in office from a heart attack.
Vacant		August 13, 1947 – November 19, 1947	Sonoma	
Clarence J. Tauzer	Republican	November 19, 1947 – September 4, 1948	Sonoma	Sworn in after winning special election. Died in office from a heart attack.
Vacant		September 4, 1948 – January 3, 1949	Sonoma	
Farley Presley Abshire	Republican	January 3, 1949 – January 5, 1959	Sonoma	
Joseph A. Rattigan	Democratic	January 5, 1959 – January 2, 1967	Sonoma	
Richard J. Dolwig	Republican	January 2, 1967 – January 4, 1971	San Mateo	
Arlen F. Gregorio	Democratic	January 4, 1971 – November 30, 1974	San Mateo	
Jerry Smith	Democratic	December 2, 1974 – December 14, 1979	Santa Clara	Resigned from the Senate.
Vacant		December 14, 1979 – June 12, 1980	Santa Clara	
Dan O'Keefe	Republican	June 12, 1980 – November 30, 1982	Santa Clara	Sworn in after winning special election.
Dan McCorquodale	Democratic	December 6, 1982 – November 30, 1994	Santa Clara, Stanislaus	
Dan McCorquodale	Democratic	December 6, 1982 – November 30, 1994	Fresno, Madera, Mariposa, Merced, San Joaquin, Stanislaus, Tuolumne	
Dick Monteith	Republican	December 5, 1994 – November 30, 2002	Fresno, Madera, Mariposa, Merced, San Joaquin, Stanislaus, Tuolumne	
Jeff Denham	Republican	December 2, 2002 – November 30, 2010	Madera, Merceded, Monterey, San Benito, Stanislaus	
Anthony Cannella	Republican	December 6, 2010 – November 30, 2018	Madera, Merceded, Monterey, San Benito, Stanislaus	
Anthony Cannella	Republican	December 6, 2010 – November 30, 2018	Fresno, Madera, Merced, Monterey, San Benito, Stanislaus	
Anna Caballero	Democratic	December 3, 2018 – November 30, 2022	Fresno, Madera, Merced, Monterey, San Benito, Stanislaus	
Shannon Grove	Republican	December 5, 2022 – present	Fresno, Kern, Tulare	

== Election results (1990-present) ==
=== 2022 ===
2022 California State Senate 12th district election
Primary election
Party	Candidate	Votes	%
Republican	Shannon Grove (incumbent)	119,319	68.7
Democratic	Susanne Gundy	54,289	31.3
Total votes		173,608	100.0
General election
Republican	Shannon Grove (incumbent)	196,017	68.7
Democratic	Susanne Gundy	89,471	31.3
Total votes		285,488	100.0
Republican gain from Democratic			

=== 2018 ===
2018 California State Senate 12th district election
Primary election
Party	Candidate	Votes	%
Democratic	Anna Caballero	46,970	43.3
Republican	Rob Poythress	28,512	26.3
Republican	Johnny Tacherra	24,088	22.2
Democratic	Daniel Parra	8,740	8.1
Democratic	Dennis J. Brazil (write-in)	208	0.2
Total votes		108,518	100.0
General election
Democratic	Anna Caballero	110,386	54.4
Republican	Rob Poythress	92,691	45.6
Total votes		203,077	100.0
Democratic gain from Republican			

=== 2014 ===
2014 California State Senate 12th district election
Primary election
Party	Candidate	Votes	%
Republican	Anthony Cannella (incumbent)	47,551	63.8
Democratic	Shawn K. Bagley	27,017	36.2
Total votes		74,568	100.0
General election
Republican	Anthony Cannella (incumbent)	74,988	60.5
Democratic	Shawn K. Bagley	49,039	39.5
Total votes		124,027	100.0
Republican hold			

=== 2010 ===
2010 California State Senate 12th district election
Party	Candidate	Votes	%
Republican	Anthony Cannella	92,270	51.5
Democratic	Anna Caballero	86,963	48.5
Total votes		179,233	100.0
Republican hold			

=== 2008 (recall) ===
2008 California State Senate 12th district special recall election
Choice	Votes	%
For	20,043	24.64
Against	61,309	75.36
Total	81,352	100.00

2008 California State Senate 12th district special recall election Successor of Jeff Denham if a majority vote in favor of recall
Party	Candidate	Votes	%
Democratic	Simon Salinas	30,946	100.0
Total votes		30,946	100.0

=== 2006 ===
2006 California State Senate 12th district election
Party	Candidate	Votes	%
Republican	Jeff Denham (incumbent)	92,879	59.8
Democratic	Wiley Nickel	62,539	40.2
Total votes		155,418	100.0
Republican hold			

=== 2002 ===
2002 California State Senate 12th district election
Party	Candidate	Votes	%
Republican	Jeff Denham	73,877	48.3
Democratic	Rusty Areias	72,034	47.1
Libertarian	David Eaton	6,950	4.5
Total votes		152,861	100.0
Republican hold			

=== 1998 ===
1998 California State Senate 12th district election
Party	Candidate	Votes	%
Republican	Dick Monteith (incumbent)	110,690	53.0
Democratic	Sal Cannella	91,623	43.9
Libertarian	Mary Lee Gowlan	6,389	3.1
Total votes		208,702	100.00
Republican hold			

=== 1994 ===
1994 California State Senate 12th district election
Party	Candidate	Votes	%
Republican	Dick Monteith	100,902	49.5
Democratic	Dan McCorquodale (incumbent)	96,543	47.3
Libertarian	Linda Marie DeGroat	6,596	3.2
Total votes		204,041	100.0
Republican gain from Democratic			

=== 1990 ===
1994 California State Senate 12th district election
Party	Candidate	Votes	%
Democratic	Dan McCorquodale (incumbent)	106,857	59.1
Republican	Lori Kennedy	73,912	40.9
Total votes		180,769	100.0
Democratic hold			

== Maps ==
California SD-12 (2011)

California's 12th state senate district after the 2020 redistricting cycle (went into effect for the 2022 election)

== See also ==
- California State Senate
- California State Senate districts
- Districts in California
