= Anna Caballero =

American politician (born 1955)

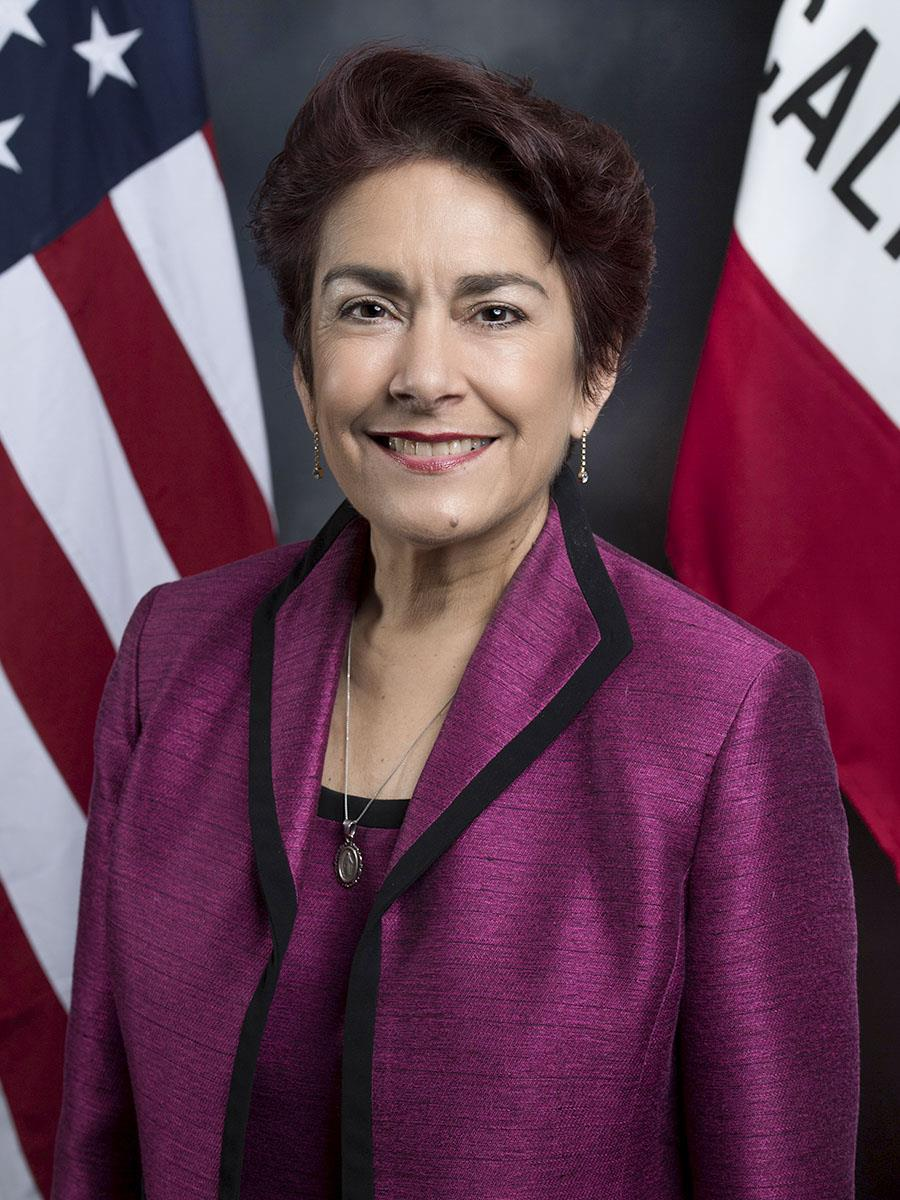

Member of the California State Senate
- Incumbent
- Assumed office December 3, 2018
- Preceded by: Anthony Cannella
- Constituency: 12th district (2018–2022); 14th district (2022–present)

Member of the California State Assembly from the 30th district
- In office December 5, 2016 – November 30, 2018
- Preceded by: Luis Alejo
- Succeeded by: Robert Rivas

Member of the California State Assembly from the 28th district
- In office December 4, 2006 – November 30, 2010
- Preceded by: Simon Salinas
- Succeeded by: Luis Alejo

Personal details
- Born: Anna Marie Caballero; April 18, 1955 (age 71) Arizona, U.S.
- Party: Democratic
- Spouse: Juan Uranga
- Children: 3
- Education: University of California, San Diego (BA); University of California, Los Angeles (JD)

Anna Marie Caballero (born April 18, 1955) is an American politician serving in the California State Senate. A Democrat, she represents the 14th State Senate district, which includes Merced, Madera and Fresno Counties and part of the Central Valley. She previously served in the California State Assembly representing the 30th Assembly District, encompassing the Pajaro and Salinas Valleys in the Central Coast, from 2016 to 2018 and the 28th Assembly District from 2006 to 2010.

== Early life and education ==
Born in Arizona to a family of copper miners, Caballero moved to the Salinas Valley to work for California Rural Legal Assistance. She received her B.A. degree from the University of California, San Diego and her Juris Doctor from the UCLA School of Law.

== Career ==
As an attorney, Caballero represented striking farm workers and fought side by side with unions to prevent plant closures. She, along with three partners, founded the law firm Caballero, Matcham & McCarthy, in 1982 to provide low cost legal service. Caballero was recognized with the Athena Award for entrepreneurial excellence.

Caballero served on the Planning Commission and was later elected to the Salinas City Council in 1991. She was then elected Mayor in 1998. As Mayor, she navigated Salinas through budgetary problems and saved Salinas's libraries as reported by the LA Times. Caballero was elected to the State Assembly in 2006.

Caballero ran for the California State Senate in 2010 to replace term-limited Republican incumbent Jeff Denham, who ran successfully for Congress. She lost to Republican Ceres Mayor Anthony Cannella in an upset.

California Governor Jerry Brown appointed Caballero to lead the California State and Consumer Services Agency on March 22, 2011, serving until 2015. In 2016, she was again elected as a Democrat to the California State Assembly.

In 2018, Caballero announced that she would again run for the state Senate to succeed Cannella, who was term limited. She won the seat, defeating Republican Madera County Supervisor Rob Poythress.

Caballero has also served as the executive director of Partners for Peace, a nonprofit organization dedicated to bringing the community together to prevent gang violence and focus on literacy, early childhood education, and providing services to families. Caballero is also a wife and mother. Her husband, Juan Uranga, is the Director of the Center for Community Advocacy in Salinas.

In May 2025, Caballero officially launched her campaign for the 2026 California State Treasurer election.

== Electoral history ==
2006 California State Assembly 28th district election
Primary election
Party	Candidate	Votes	%
Democratic	Anna Caballero	16,506	61.1
Democratic	Ana Ventura Phares	10,453	38.6
Democratic	Ignacio Velazquez (write-in)	97	0.3
Total votes		27,056	100.0
General election
Democratic	Anna Caballero	43,570	57.5
Republican	Ignacio Velazquez	32,303	42.5
Total votes		75,873	100.0
Democratic hold			

2008 California State Assembly 28th district election
Primary election
Party	Candidate	Votes	%
Democratic	Anna Caballero (incumbent)	21,328	100.0
Total votes		21,328	100.0
General election
Democratic	Anna Caballero (incumbent)	90,012	100.0
Total votes		90,012	100.0
Democratic hold			

2016 California State Assembly 30th district election
Primary election
Party	Candidate	Votes	%
Democratic	Anna Caballero	37,505	46.1
Democratic	Karina Cervantez Alejo	21,158	26.0
Republican	Georgia Acosta	12,662	15.6
Republican	John M. Nevill	9,949	12.2
Total votes		81,274	100.0
General election
Democratic	Anna Caballero	79,885	62.5
Democratic	Karina Cervantez Alejo	47,998	37.5
Total votes		127,883	100.0
Democratic hold			

2018 California State Senate 12th district election
Primary election
Party	Candidate	Votes	%
Democratic	Anna Caballero	46,970	43.3
Republican	Rob Poythress	28,512	26.3
Republican	Johnny Tacherra	24,088	22.2
Democratic	Daniel Parra	8,740	8.1
Democratic	Dennis J. Brazil (write-in)	208	0.2
Total votes		108,518	100.0
General election
Democratic	Anna Caballero	110,386	54.4
Republican	Rob Poythress	92,691	45.6
Total votes		203,077	100.0
Democratic gain from Republican			

2022 California State Senate 14th district election
Primary election
Party	Candidate	Votes	%
Democratic	Anna Caballero (incumbent)	47,488	52.0
Republican	Amnon Shor	38,244	41.9
Democratic	Paulina Miranda	5,530	6.1
Total votes		91,262	100.0
General election
Democratic	Anna Caballero (incumbent)	90,016	56.3
Republican	Amnon Shor	69,970	43.7
Total votes		159,986	100.0
Democratic hold			
