= Dick Monteith (politician) =

American politician (1932–2024)

Richard J. Monteith

Member of the California Senate from the 12th district
- In office December 5, 1994 - November 30, 2002
- Preceded by: Dan McCorquodale
- Succeeded by: Jeff Denham

Personal details
- Born: February 7, 1932 Los Banos, California, U.S.
- Died: March 6, 2024 (aged 92)
- Party: Republican
- Spouse: Jeanine
- Children: 5

Military service
- Branch/service: United States Navy

Richard J. Monteith (February 7, 1932 – March 6, 2024) was an American politician from California and a member of the Republican Party.

== State Senate ==
A conservative businessman in the agriculture industry, Monteith ran for California State Senate in 1994 against three term Democratic incumbent Dan McCorquodale. The 12th District, formerly based eastern Santa Clara County, shifted entirely into the conservative Central Valley after reapportionment, taking away McCorquodale's natural home advantage. Monteith won in an upset (thanks to that year's GOP tide) and handily won a nasty reelection battle in 1998 against former Democratic Assemblyman Sal Cannella.

== Congressional Race ==
Prevented from seeking reelection in 2002 because of state term limits, Monteith made an unsuccessful run for the Congressional seat of Gary Condit, who had been defeated in the Democratic primary by Assemblyman Dennis Cardoza. Cardoza beat Monteith 51% to 43% in a district that had been redrawn in favor of a Democrat.

== Later life and death ==
Monteith later served on the Stanislaus County Board of Supervisors, a position he held from 2006.

Monteith died on March 6, 2024, at the age of 92.

California Senate
Preceded by Dan McCorquodale	California State Senate, 12th District; December 5, 1994 – November 30, 2002	Succeeded by Jeff Denham
