= Patti Wood =

American body language expert

- Education: Florida State University
- Alma mater: Auburn University
- Occupations: Body language expert and author
- Writing career
- Subject: Body language
- Notable works: SNAP Making the Most of First Impressions, Body Language and Charisma

Patti Wood is an American body language expert and published author who usually appears in media to render her opinion on the body language of celebrities and public figures.

== Body language analysis ==
Wood has commented on the body language of celebrities and public figures to national and international media outlets, including Gary Condit, Tom Cruise, Penélope Cruz, Jennifer Lopez, Ben Affleck, Callista Flockhart, Harrison Ford, and Tiger Woods. Her analyses have appeared in the Huffington Post, USA Today, The New York Times, and People Magazine.

== Published works ==
Wood is the author of books on communication including Snap: Making the Most of First Impressions, Body Language and Charisma, published by New World Library in 2011 (ISBN 978-157731-939-9) and Success Signals: A Guide to Reading Body Language, published by Communication Dynamics in 2005.(ISBN 0964622866)

== Public speaking and teaching ==
Wood is a body language researcher, speaker and author. She is a former University Instructor in Communication and taught courses such as; Nonverbal Communication, Public Speaking, Interpersonal Skills, Human Relations, Team Building and Group Dynamics, and later taught Continuing Education Courses on Body language and First Impressions, and Body Language and Deception Detection at Emory University. She earned a bachelor's degree in communication from Florida State University and a Master of Arts in speech communication from Auburn University. She has completed four years doctoral coursework at Florida State University in nonverbal communication and conducts research in nonverbal communication, first impressions, gender differences and deception detection.
