= Gary Condit =

American politician (born 1948)

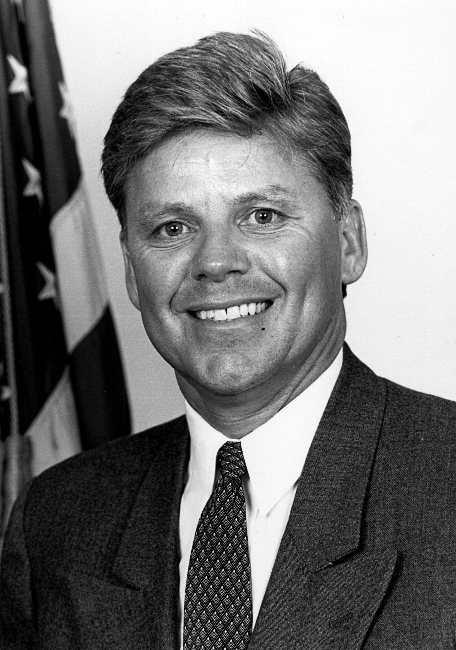
- Official portrait, 1992

Member of the U.S. House of Representatives from California
- In office September 12, 1989 – January 3, 2003 (Note: Although Condit's term began on September 12, 1989, the day of and the day he won his special election, he was not sworn in until September 20.)
- Preceded by: Tony Coelho
- Succeeded by: Dennis Cardoza
- Constituency: 15th district (1989–1993); 18th district (1993–2003)

Member of the California State Assembly from the 27th district
- In office December 6, 1982 – September 20, 1989
- Preceded by: John E. Thurman
- Succeeded by: Sal Cannella

Personal details
- Born: Gary Adrian Condit; April 21, 1948 (age 78) Salina, Oklahoma, U.S.
- Party: Democratic
- Spouse: Carolyn Berry
- Children: 2
- Education: Modesto Junior College (AA); California State University, Stanislaus (BA)

Gary Adrian Condit (born April 21, 1948) is an American former politician from California. A Democrat, Condit represented California's 18th congressional district in the United States House of Representatives from 1989 to 2003.

Condit gained significant national attention after the May 2001 disappearance of Chandra Levy, an intern with the Federal Bureau of Prisons. Condit and Levy were having an affair, and Levy was later found to have been murdered. Condit was questioned several times during the investigation and became the subject of extensive media coverage. He was never charged in connection with Levy's disappearance, and her murder remains unsolved.

== Early life ==
Gary Condit was born in Salina, Oklahoma, on April 21, 1948, the son of Velma Jean (Tidwell) Condit (1929–2017) and Adrian Burl Condit (1927–2021), a Baptist minister. He was raised and educated in Oklahoma, and graduated from Tulsa's Nathan Hale High School. During the summers of his high school years, Condit worked as a roustabout in Oklahoma's oil fields. In 1967, at age 18, he married his high school sweetheart, Carolyn Berry. An investigation by journalists in 2001 revealed that Condit had provided an inaccurate birth date when applying for his marriage license. At the time, Oklahoma required males under age 21 to have parental consent to marry; by claiming to have been born in 1942 rather than 1948, Condit evaded this requirement.

In 1967, when Condit's father became pastor of a Baptist church near Modesto, his family relocated there. Condit began attendance at Modesto Junior College and received an Associate of Arts degree in 1970. In 1972, he received a B.A. degree from California State University, Stanislaus. While attending college and at the start of his career, Condit worked at a variety of jobs, including one at a tomato cannery, one at a factory that made munitions during the Vietnam War, and one in the paint department of a Montgomery Ward department store.

== Political career ==
Condit served on the Ceres City Council from 1972 to 1976. In 1975 and 1976, he served as mayor, becoming the youngest mayor in the city's history at the age of 25. Condit served on the Stanislaus County Board of Supervisors from 1976 to 1982 and was elected to the California State Assembly in 1982.

=== California State Assembly ===
In 1988, Condit was a member of the "Gang of Five" – with Charles M. Calderon of Whittier, Gerald R. Eaves of Rialto, Rusty Areias of Los Banos and Steve Peace of Chula Vista – that failed to unseat Willie Brown as Speaker of the State Assembly by making a deal with Republicans. Peace co-wrote and produced the 1988 film Return of the Killer Tomatoes, in which Condit appeared in an uncredited non-speaking cameo during a fight sequence.

=== U.S. House of Representatives ===
Condit was elected to Congress in 1989 in a special election after the resignation of House Democratic Whip Tony Coelho. He was elected to a full term in 1990, and reelected five more times without serious difficulty (Condit had no Republican challenger during the general elections of 1992 and 1998). His most important committee assignment was as a senior member on the House Intelligence Committee in the months and years prior to the September 11 attacks. Like most Democrats from the Central Valley, Condit was somewhat more conservative than other Democrats from California. Being a Blue Dog Democrat, Condit voted against President Bill Clinton more frequently than other members of his party in the chamber. Condit took several populist progressive positions such as opposing NAFTA despite intense lobbying from his own district's wine industry and President Clinton himself, voted against the landmark repeal of Glass-Steagall protections, and against the Iraq War and intervention in Kosovo. In the aftermath of Kosovo, Condit was a persistent force in compelling the prosecution of Slobodan Miloševic.

In 1998, during the Monica Lewinsky scandal, Condit publicly demanded that Clinton "come clean" on his relationship with the young woman; a video of this demand was aired almost daily during Condit's own scandal involving a relationship with Bureau of Prisons intern Chandra Levy. Following the September 11, 2001 attacks, interest in the Levy case declined. Condit kept his seat on the Intelligence Committee, retained his security clearance, and was one of a small number of members of Congress who were cleared to see the most sensitive information on the 9/11 attacks. On December 7, 2001, Condit announced he would run for re-election. He lost the Democratic primary election in March 2002 to his former aide, then-Assemblyman Dennis Cardoza, and left Congress at the end of his term in January 2003. Condit's most notable vote in his last months in office was the resolution to expel Congressman James Traficant after his conviction on corruption charges. In the 420–1 vote on July 24, 2002, Condit was the sole "nay".

=== Levy scandal ===
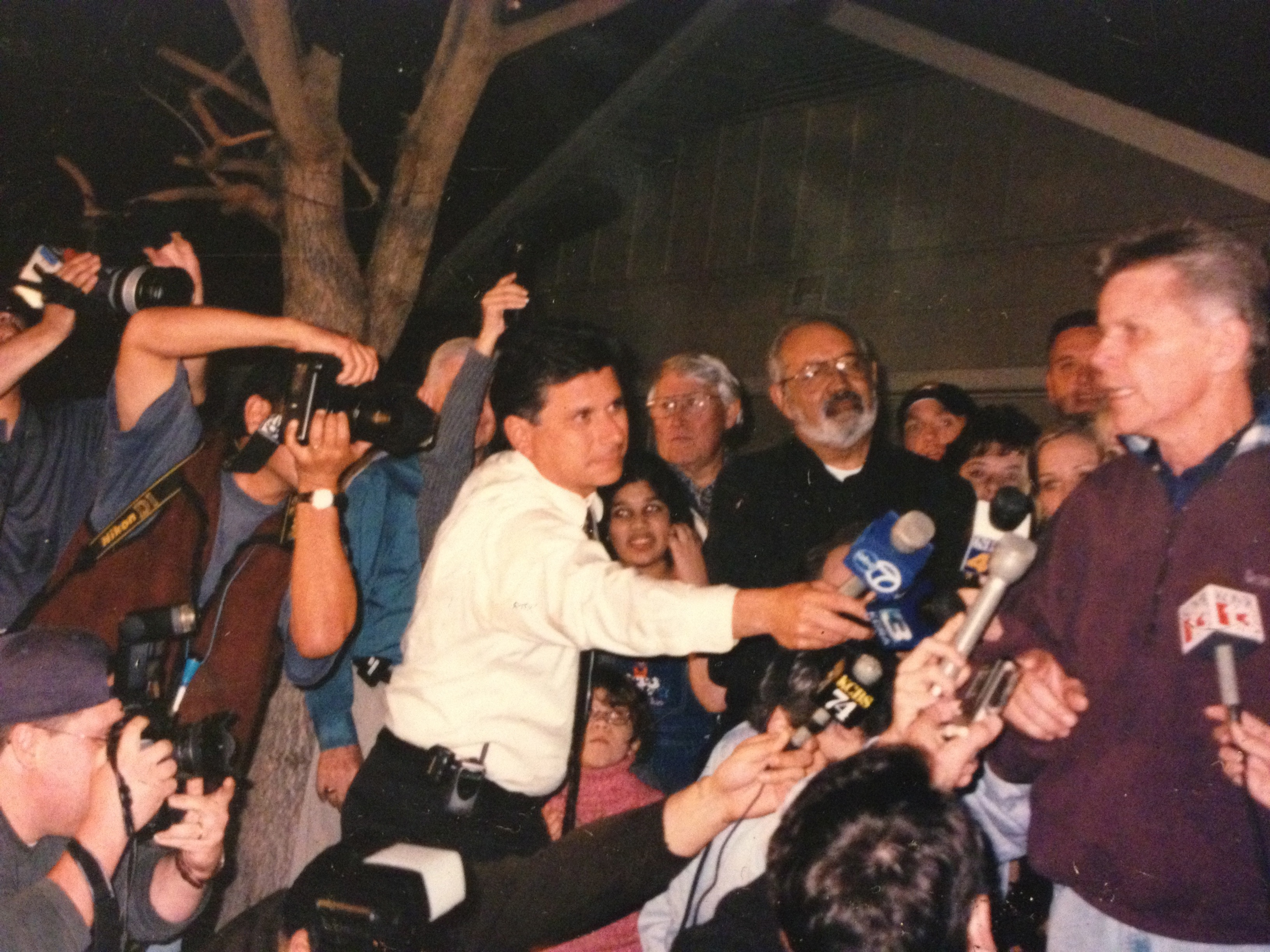
Reporters with Condit, August 17, 2001

In 2001, Condit became the subject of national news coverage after the disappearance of Chandra Levy, a young woman working as a Washington, D.C., intern, originally from Condit's district. Police questioned Condit twice, and both times he denied having an extramarital affair with her; however, Levy's aunt eventually went public with conversations she had with her about their relationship. Police questioned Condit a third time, and he confessed to the affair. When the affair began, Condit was 53 and Levy was 23. While Condit was not named as an official suspect in the disappearance, Levy's family suspected that he was withholding important information. His reputation suffered from the contrast between his "pro-family" politics, his adultery with a woman younger than his daughter, and his attempts to mislead the police regarding his affair. In July, two months after Levy vanished, Condit agreed to let investigators search his apartment; hours before the search, police said he was spotted throwing a gift box he had received from another woman into a dumpster in a Washington suburb. This followed news reports that Condit had had an affair with a flight attendant.

In an August 2001 televised interview with Connie Chung, Condit acknowledged that he had had a five-month relationship with Levy but did not say whether the relationship was sexual. Condit also admitted that, "in 34 years of marriage, [he had] not been 'a perfect man'" and had made his "fair share of mistakes." Condit denied having killed Levy and denied having any information on her disappearance.

Levy's remains were not found during the extensive search that followed her disappearance. On May 22, 2002, they were discovered accidentally in a secluded area of Rock Creek Park in Washington, D.C. Levy's death was declared a homicide. In late 2002, Condit sued writer Dominick Dunne of Vanity Fair for $11 million, claiming that Dunne defamed him by suggesting he ordered Levy killed in 2001. Condit's attorney said that the libel lawsuit was based on comments Dunne repeated on national radio and television programs in December 2001, where he suggested Condit frequented Middle Eastern embassies for sexual activity with prostitutes and that, during those times, he made it clear that he wanted someone to get rid of Levy. Condit's attorney said that Dunne's comments "conveyed that Gary Condit was involved in her kidnapping and in her murder, that friends of Gary Condit had her kidnapped, put in an airplane and dropped in the Atlantic Ocean." Dunne paid an undisclosed amount to settle that lawsuit in March 2005. Dunne said he had been "completely hoodwinked" by an unreliable informant. Subsequently, Condit sued Dunne again, charging him with "revivifying" the slander in an appearance on CNN's Larry King Live in November 2005. In July 2008 a federal judge dismissed the second lawsuit filed against Dunne.

In July 2006, Condit sued the Sonoran News, a free weekly newspaper, for defamation of character after the publication wrote "that Condit was the 'main focus in the Chandra Levy case in 2001, after lying to investigators about his affair with Levy.'" The case was dismissed in July 2007 when the judge ruled that Condit had not proved the statement was false, or that the paper had published it with malice. Years later, Condit publicly denied ever having an affair with Chandra Levy.

Police continued the murder investigation, and in March 2009, a warrant was issued for the arrest of Ingmar Guandique, an illegal immigrant from El Salvador who had already been convicted and imprisoned for two other attacks on women in Rock Creek Park. He was subsequently indicted for Levy's murder. On November 22, 2010, Guandique was found guilty of first-degree murder, and was sentenced in February 2011 to 60 years in prison. Condit's lawyer Bert Fields said, "It's a complete vindication but that comes a little late. Who gives him his career back?" On June 4, 2015, D.C. Superior Court Judge Gerald Fisher granted a motion for the retrial of Guandique after it was revealed that the sole witness against him, a jailhouse informant named Armando Morales, had lied about prior jailhouse testimony. Prosecutors dropped all charges against Guandique on July 28, 2016, after an associate of Morales came forward with secret recordings in which he admitted to falsifying testimony about the murder of Levy. Levy's death therefore remains unsolved.

== Business career ==
After his departure from office, Condit moved to Arizona and operated two Baskin-Robbins ice cream stores with his wife and son. When the franchise failed, Condit was ordered to pay the company $98,000 in a breach of contract proceeding. In 2012, he was reported to be serving as president of the Phoenix Institute of Desert Agriculture, which listed its status as "Dissolved" in the last corporate filing as of June 4, 2015. Condit later returned to California, where he became a registered lobbyist with the J. Blonien law firm of Sacramento.

== Family ==
=== Involvement in local politics ===
In 2012, Condit's son, Chad, announced his intention to run for the House of Representatives as an independent in California's redrawn 10th congressional district. He lost in the top-two election against incumbent Republican Jeff Denham and Democratic challenger José M. Hernández. In 2022, Chad ran for the State Assembly to represent the 22nd Assembly district. Chad finished in 3rd place in the jungle primary and did not advance to the general election. After his loss, Chad worked on Marie Alvarado-Gil's campaign for State Senate, and became her chief of staff after she won her election. In December 2023, he was fired from his position, and later sued Alvarado-Gil alleging sexual harassment.

Condit's daughter, Cadee Condit Gray, was previously married to Adam Gray, a congressman representing California's 13th congressional district since 2025. Gray also served as a California State Assembly member representing the 21st district (2012–2022). In 2020, Condit's nephew Buck was elected to the Stanislaus County Board of Supervisors for district 1, defeating Modesto City Councilman Bill Zoslocki 58.77% to 41.23%. Earlier in 2018, Condit's grandson, Channce Condit, ran unopposed for a seat on the Ceres City Council. In 2020, Channce was elected to the Stanislaus County Board of Supervisors after he defeated Tom Hallinan 60% to 40%, joining his father's cousin, Buck, on the board.

In 2015, another grandson of Condit, Couper Condit, was appointed to the Ceres planning commission but was denied reappointment in 2020 by the council. Couper Condit won a seat on the Ceres City Council later in 2020 by defeating incumbent Michael "Mike" Kline by a 38.19% to 23.52% margin, with two other competitors falling short. After serving for 10 months on the Ceres City Council, Couper Condit resigned with no explanation. Couper Condit has also worked as the district director for Assemblymember Heath Flora.

In 2023, another grandson of Condit, Gary M. Condit (named after his grandfather), was appointed to the Ceres Planning Commission. Gary M. Condit ran for Ceres mayor in 2024 but lost the race to the incumbent mayor, Javier Lopez, by a little under 5%. His wife, Destiny Suarez, worked at the office of State Senator Marie Alvarado-Gil, but quit about eight months after her father in-law, Chad Condit, was fired from the same workplace.

== Electoral history ==
1989 special election
Party	Candidate	Votes	%
Democratic	Gary Condit		57.1
Republican	Clare L. Berryhill		35.0
Republican	Robert J. Weimer		3.3
Republican	Cliff Burris		2.6
Libertarian	Roy Shrimp		0.9
Republican	Chris Patterakis		0.4
Republican	David M. "Dave" Williams		0.4
Republican	Jack E. McCoy		0.2
Total votes			100.0
Turnout			
Democratic hold			

1990 United States House of Representatives elections in California
Party	Candidate	Votes	%
Democratic	Gary Condit (Incumbent)	97,147	66.2
Republican	Cliff Burris	49,634	33.8
Total votes		146,781	100.0
Turnout			
Democratic hold			

1992 United States House of Representatives elections in California
Party	Candidate	Votes	%
Democratic	Gary Condit (incumbent)	139,704	84.7
Libertarian	Kim R. Almstrom	25,307	15.3
Total votes		165,011	100.0
Turnout			
Democratic hold			

1994 United States House of Representatives elections in California
Party	Candidate	Votes	%
Democratic	Gary Condit (incumbent)	91,106	65.52
Republican	Tom Carter	44,046	31.68
Libertarian	James B. Morzella	3,902	2.81
Total votes		139,054	100.0
Turnout			
Democratic hold			

1996 United States House of Representatives elections in California
Party	Candidate	Votes	%
Democratic	Gary Condit (incumbent)	108,827	65.8%
Republican	Bill Conrad	52,695	31.8%
Libertarian	James Morzella	2,233	1.3%
Natural Law	Page Riskin	1,831	1.1%
Total votes		165,586	100.0%
Turnout			
Democratic hold			

1998 United States House of Representatives elections in California
Party	Candidate	Votes	%
Democratic	Gary Condit (incumbent)	118,842	86.79%
Libertarian	Linda M. Degroat	18,089	13.21%
Total votes		136,931	100.0%
Turnout			
Democratic hold			

2000 United States House of Representatives elections in California
Party	Candidate	Votes	%
Democratic	Gary Condit (incumbent)	118,842	67.2%
Republican	Steve R. Wilson	56,465	31.3%
Natural Law	Page Roth Riskin	2,860	1.5%
Total votes		178,167	100.0%
Turnout			
Democratic hold			

== See also ==
- List of federal political sex scandals in the United States

== Notes ==
U.S. House of Representatives
Preceded by Tony Coelho	Member of the U.S. House of Representatives from California's 15th congressional district 1989–1993	Succeeded by Norman Mineta
Preceded by Richard H. Lehman	Member of the U.S. House of Representatives from California's 18th congressional district 1993–2003	Succeeded by Dennis Cardoza
Party political offices
New office	Chair of the Blue Dog Coalition for Administration; 1995–1999; Served alongside: John S. Tanner (Communications), Nathan Deal, Collin Peterson (Policy)	Succeeded by Robert E. Cramer
U.S. order of precedence (ceremonial)
Preceded by Barry Goldwater Jr. as Former U.S. Representative	Order of precedence of the United States as Former U.S. Representative	Succeeded by Cal Dooley as Former U.S. Representative
