= Senator O'Keefe =

Senator O'Keefe may refer to:

- Dan O'Keefe (politician), California State Senate
- David O'Keefe (Australian politician) (1864–1943), Australian Senate
- Michael O'Keefe (Louisiana politician) (born 1932), Louisiana State Senate
