= California's 28th State Assembly district =

American legislative district

Current assemblymember
Gail Pellerin; D–Santa Cruz
- Population (2010) • Voting age • Citizen voting age: 466,090; 354,635; 293,328
- Demographics: 50.40% White; 2.46% Black; 17.41% Latino; 27.97% Asian; 0.52% Native American; 0.38% Hawaiian/Pacific Islander; 0.27% other; 0.59% remainder of multiracial
- Registered voters: 254,471
- Registration: 43.75% Democratic; 19.43% Republican; 33.46% No party preference

California's 28th State Assembly district is one of 80 California State Assembly districts. It is currently represented by Democrat Gail Pellerin of Santa Cruz.

== District profile ==
The district is currently located in the southwestern corner of Silicon Valley and consists mainly of middle-income and affluent residential communities and neighborhoods. Like other districts in Silicon Valley, the district is also home to the headquarters of many tech corporations.

Prior to the 2021 redistricting, District 28 covered a smaller area further north into Silicon Valley, largely comprising Los Gatos, Campbell, Saratoga, Cupertino, and parts of downtown San Jose. Its current profile was at that time covered by District 29, which similarly included Santa Cruz, Scotts Valley, and parts of Morgan Hill, but extended further south along the coast to Monterey.

Santa Clara County -- 18.01%

- Los Gatos
- Monte Sereno
- Morgan Hill
- San Jose

Santa Cruz County -- 45.60%

- Santa Cruz
- Scotts Valley

== Election results from statewide races ==
Year	Office	Results
2021	Recall	No 73.6 – 26.4%
2020	President	Biden 73.1 – 24.5%
2018	Governor	Newsom 69.6 – 30.4%
2018	Senator	Feinstein 59.4 – 40.6%
2016	President	Clinton 70.6 – 23.1%
2016	Senator	Harris 72.4 – 27.6%
2014	Governor	Brown 69.7 – 30.3%
2012	President	Obama 66.6 – 30.8%
2012	Senator	Feinstein 69.1 – 30.9%

== List of assembly members representing the district ==
Due to redistricting, the 28th district has been moved around different parts of the state. The current iteration resulted from the 2021 redistricting by the California Citizens Redistricting Commission.

Assembly members	Party	Years served	Counties represented	Notes
Joseph Almy	Republican	January 5, 1885 – January 3, 1887	Marin	
John W. Atherton	Republican	January 3, 1887 – January 5, 1891	Marin	
Thomas H. Estey	Republican	January 5, 1891 – January 2, 1893	Marin	
T. P. Cusick	Democratic	January 2, 1893 – January 7, 1895	San Francisco	
H. Healey	Democratic	January 7, 1895 – January 4, 1897	San Francisco	
Eugene F. Lacy	Democratic	January 4, 1897 – January 2, 1899	San Francisco	
Lawrence J. Hoey	Republican	January 2, 1899 – January 1, 1901	San Francisco	
Charles R. Franklin	Republican	January 1, 1901 – January 5, 1903	San Francisco	
John M. Murphy	Union Labor	January 5, 1903 – January 5, 1905	San Francisco	
William James Mindham	Republican	January 5, 1905 – January 7, 1907	San Francisco	
Peter J. Kelly	Republican	January 7, 1907 – January 4, 1909	San Francisco	
Walter Harper Macauley	Republican	January 4, 1909 – January 2, 1911	San Francisco	
Andrew M. Cunningham	Republican	January 2, 1911 – January 6, 1913	San Francisco	
William Stoddard Scott	Republican	January 6, 1913 – January 4, 1915	San Francisco	
James J. McDonald	Republican	January 4, 1915 – January 8, 1917	San Francisco	
Charles W. Goetting	Republican	January 8, 1917 – January 3, 1921	San Francisco	
George W. Lee	Republican	January 3, 1921 – January 8, 1923	San Francisco	
Louis F. Erb	Republican	January 8, 1923 – January 5, 1925	San Francisco	
Edgar C. Levey	Republican	January 5, 1925 – January 7, 1935	San Francisco	
James F. Brennan	Democratic	January 7, 1935 – January 4, 1937	San Francisco	
Edgar C. Levey	Republican	January 4, 1937 – January 2, 1939	San Francisco	
Robert Miller Green	Republican	January 2, 1939 – January 7, 1942	San Francisco	Resigned to be a Member of the San Francisco Board of Supervisors.
Vacant		January 7, 1942 – January 4, 1943	San Francisco	
Raup Miller	Republican	January 4, 1943 – January 6, 1947	Santa Clara	
Robert C. Kirkwood	Republican	January 6, 1947 – January 6, 1953	Santa Clara	Resigned to accept appointment of the office of California State Controller.
Vacant		January 6, 1953 – April 6, 1953	Santa Clara	
Clark L. Bradley	Nonpartisan	April 6, 1953 – January 7, 1963	Santa Clara	Was sworn in, after winning a vacant seat when Kirkwood was appointed as California State Controller.
Clark L. Bradley	Republican	April 6, 1953 – January 7, 1963	Santa Clara	Was sworn in, after winning a vacant seat when Kirkwood was appointed as California State Controller.
Jack T. Casey	Democratic	January 7, 1963 – January 2, 1967	Kern	
Kent H. Stacey	Republican	January 2, 1967 – January 8, 1973	Kern	
Raymond Joseph Gonzales	Democratic	January 8, 1973 – November 30, 1974	Kern	
Frank Murphy Jr.	Republican	December 2, 1974 – November 30, 1976	Monterey, Santa Cruz	
Henry J. Mello	Democratic	December 6, 1976 – November 30, 1980	Monterey, Santa Cruz	
Sam Farr	Democratic	December 1, 1980 – November 30, 1992	Monterey, Santa Cruz	
Rusty Areias	Democratic	December 7, 1992 – November 30, 1994	Monterey, San Benito, Santa Clara, Santa Cruz	
Peter Frusetta	Republican	December 5, 1994 – November 30, 2000	Monterey, San Benito, Santa Clara, Santa Cruz	
Simon Salinas	Democratic	December 4, 2000 – November 30, 2006	Monterey, San Benito, Santa Clara, Santa Cruz	
Anna Caballero	Democratic	December 4, 2006 – November 30, 2010	Monterey, San Benito, Santa Clara, Santa Cruz	
Luis Alejo	Democratic	December 6, 2010 – November 30, 2012	Monterey, San Benito, Santa Clara, Santa Cruz	
Paul Fong	Democratic	December 3, 2012 – November 30, 2014	Santa Clara	
Evan Low	Democratic	December 1, 2014 – November 30, 2022	Santa Clara	
Gail Pellerin	Democratic	December 5, 2022 – present	Santa Clara, Santa Cruz	

== Election results (1990–present) ==
=== 2024 ===
2024 California State Assembly 28th district election
Primary election
Party	Candidate	Votes	%
Democratic	Gail Pellerin (incumbent)	85,600	69.2
Republican	Liz Lawler	38,166	30.8
Total votes		123,766	100.0
General election
Democratic	Gail Pellerin (incumbent)	151,419	66.9
Republican	Liz Lawler	75,069	33.1
Total votes		226,488	100.0
Democratic hold			

=== 2022 ===
2022 California State Assembly 28th district election
Primary election
Party	Candidate	Votes	%
Democratic	Gail Pellerin	41,575	35.9
Republican	Liz Lawler	34,065	29.4
Democratic	Rob Rennie	28,592	24.7
Democratic	Joe Thompson	11,664	10.1
Total votes		115,896	100.0
General election
Democratic	Gail Pellerin	121,119	68.0
Republican	Liz Lawler	56,917	32.0
Total votes		178,036	100.0
Democratic hold			

=== 2020 ===
2020 California State Assembly 28th district election
Primary election
Party	Candidate	Votes	%
Democratic	Evan Low (incumbent)	96,976	71.1
Republican	Carlos Rafael Cruz	32,136	23.6
No party preference	Sam Ross	7,350	5.4
Total votes		136,462	100.0
General election
Democratic	Evan Low (incumbent)	166,733	71.6
Republican	Carlos Rafael Cruz	65,976	28.4
Total votes		232,709	100.0
Democratic hold			

=== 2018 ===
2018 California State Assembly 28th district election
Primary election
Party	Candidate	Votes	%
Democratic	Evan Low (incumbent)	77,011	70.8
Republican	Michael Snyder	31,776	29.2
Total votes		108,787	100.0
General election
Democratic	Evan Low (incumbent)	130,815	71.1
Republican	Michael Snyder	53,195	28.9
Total votes		184,010	100.0
Democratic hold			

=== 2016 ===
2016 California State Assembly 28th district election
Primary election
Party	Candidate	Votes	%
Democratic	Evan Low (incumbent)	83,038	71.5
Republican	Nicholas Sclavos	33,154	28.5
Total votes		116,192	100.0
General election
Democratic	Evan Low (incumbent)	136,547	70.0
Republican	Nicholas Sclavos	58,641	30.0
Total votes		195,188	100.0
Democratic hold			

=== 2014 ===
2014 California State Assembly 28th district election
Primary election
Party	Candidate	Votes	%
Democratic	Evan Low	30,807	39.7
Republican	Chuck Page	20,895	26.9
Democratic	Barry Chang	19,156	24.7
Republican	Michael Hunsweck	6,732	8.7
Total votes		77,590	100.0
General election
Democratic	Evan Low	71,239	59.4
Republican	Chuck Page	48,645	40.6
Total votes		119,884	100.0
Democratic hold			

=== 2012 ===
2012 California State Assembly 28th district election
Primary election
Party	Candidate	Votes	%
Democratic	Paul Fong (incumbent)	43,965	54.3
No party preference	Chad Walsh	37,060	45.7
Total votes		81,025	100.0
General election
Democratic	Paul Fong (incumbent)	108,061	62.0
No party preference	Chad Walsh	66,239	38.0
Total votes		174,300	100.0
Democratic hold			

=== 2010 ===
2010 California State Assembly 28th district election
Party	Candidate	Votes	%
Democratic	Luis Alejo	56,098	62.8
Republican	Robert Bernosky	33,264	37.2
Total votes		89,359	100.0
Democratic hold			

=== 2008 ===
2008 California State Assembly 28th district election
Party	Candidate	Votes	%
Democratic	Anna Caballero (incumbent)	90,012	100.0
Total votes		90,012	100.0
Democratic hold			

=== 2006 ===
2006 California State Assembly 28th district election
Party	Candidate	Votes	%
Democratic	Anna Caballero	43,570	57.4
Republican	Ignacio Velazquez	32,303	42.6
Total votes		75,873	100.0
Democratic hold			

=== 2004 ===
2004 California State Assembly 28th district election
Party	Candidate	Votes	%
Democratic	Simon Salinas (incumbent)	67,586	63.3
Republican	Bob Perkins	39,257	36.7
Total votes		106,843	100.0
Democratic hold			

=== 2002 ===
2002 California State Assembly 28th district election
Party	Candidate	Votes	%
Democratic	Simon Salinas (incumbent)	43,555	61.0
Republican	Jane Howard	27,945	39.0
Total votes		71,500	100.0
Democratic hold			

=== 2000 ===
2000 California State Assembly 28th district election
Party	Candidate	Votes	%
Democratic	Simon Salinas	66,011	52.9
Republican	Jeff Denham	54,729	43.8
Libertarian	Roger Ver	2,134	1.7
Reform	J. J. Vogel	2,038	1.6
Total votes		124,912	100.0
Democratic gain from Republican			

=== 1998 ===
1998 California State Assembly 28th district election
Party	Candidate	Votes	%
Republican	Peter Frusetta (incumbent)	47,735	51.6
Democratic	Alan D. Styles	40,652	44.0
Libertarian	Kate Woods	4,063	4.4
Total votes		92,450	100.0
Republican hold			

=== 1996 ===
1996 California State Assembly 28th district election
Party	Candidate	Votes	%
Republican	Peter Frusetta (incumbent)	53,649	48.9
Democratic	Lily Cervantes	51,888	47.3
Libertarian	Mark Hinkle	4,263	3.9
Total votes		109,800	100.0
Republican hold			

=== 1994 ===
1994 California State Assembly 28th district election
Party	Candidate	Votes	%
Republican	Peter Frusetta	43,696	50.2
Democratic	Lily Cervantes	43,307	49.8
Total votes		87,003	100.0
Republican gain from Democratic			

=== 1992 ===
1992 California State Assembly 28th district election
Party	Candidate	Votes	%
Democratic	Rusty Areias (incumbent)	64,747	59.0
Republican	Peter Frusetta	44,905	41.0
Total votes		109,652	100.0
Democratic hold			

=== 1990 ===
1990 California State Assembly 28th district election
Party	Candidate	Votes	%
Democratic	Sam Farr (incumbent)	80,558	71.5
Republican	West W. Walker	32,097	28.5
Total votes		112,655	100.0
Democratic hold			

== See also ==
- California State Assembly
- California State Assembly districts
- Districts in California
