= Sal Cannella =

Sal Cannella may refer to:

- Sal Cannella (politician), American politician for California
- Sal Cannella (American football), American football tight end
