= California's 28th district =

California's 28th district may refer to:

- California's 28th congressional district
- California's 28th State Assembly district
- California's 28th State Senate district
