= Raup Miller =

American politician

Member of the California State Assembly from the 28th district
- In office January 4, 1943 - January 6, 1947
- Preceded by: Robert Miller Green
- Succeeded by: Robert C. Kirkwood

Personal details
- Born: September 13, 1904 Lamar, Pennsylvania, U.S.
- Died: March 17, 1993 (aged 88) Ukiah, California, U.S.
- Party: Republican
- Children: 1
- Education: Humboldt State University (BA)

Military service
- Branch/service: United States Army
- Battles/wars: World War II

Raup Miller (September 13, 1904 – March 17, 1993) was an American politician who served as a member of the California State Assembly for the 28th District.

== Early life ==
Miller was born on September 13, 1904. A native of Lamar, Pennsylvania, he attended school in nearby Salona, Pennsylvania. As a young adult, Miller worked as an assistant for his father, a painter and carpenter.

== Career ==
Aspiring to attend college in California, Miller traveled west, stopping in Wyoming and Oregon before settling in the San Francisco Bay Area to attend the University of California, Berkeley. Prior to reaching California, Miller worked on a railroad and at a paper mill. Miller established a successful insurance business in Palo Alto, California and was elected to the California State Assembly in 1942. During his tenure in the legislature, Miller served in the United States Coast Guard during World War II. After retiring from the Assembly in 1947, he served as a member of the Palo Alto City Council. He also returned to college, completing his Bachelor of Arts degree in journalism from Humboldt State University in 1973. Miller also operated a small business in Placer County, California. In his retirement,

Miller also wrote and published collections of poetry.

== Personal life ==
Miller met his wife while studying at the University of California, Berkeley. They married in 1926 and had one daughter. Miller died on March 17, 1993, in Ukiah, California. He was 88.
