= Simon Salinas =

American politician (born 1955)

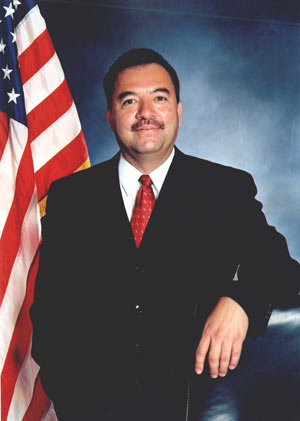

Member of the California State Assembly from the 28th district
- In office December 4, 2000 - November 30, 2006
- Preceded by: Peter Frusetta
- Succeeded by: Anna Caballero

Personal details
- Born: October 8, 1955 (age 70) Slaton, Texas
- Party: Democratic
- Children: 1
- Education: Claremont McKenna College; San Jose State University; Santa Clara University

Simon Salinas (born October 8, 1955) is a California politician. He was a member of the California State Assembly district 28 from 2000 to 2006. His district included all of Salinas and Watsonville. Before going to the Assembly, Salinas was a County Supervisor, a City Council Member, a community college instructor, and an elementary school teacher. Salinas is a Democrat. He left the assembly in 2006 because he was termed out. He surprised the political establishment by not challenging Republican incumbent Jeff Denham for the California State Senate district 12. Salinas returned to local politics and was elected to the Monterey County Board of Supervisors in 2006, representing District 3. Salinas has lived most of his life in the Salinas area, growing up around agribusiness. He has one son.

== Background ==
=== Family life ===
Salinas was born in Slaton, Texas, one of twelve children of migrant farmworkers. His family originates from the Mexican state of San Luis Potosí, where his mother attended school until the 3rd grade. His father had no formal education and originally came to the United States under the Bracero Program in the 1940s, living and working in Kansas. He returned to Mexico, married, and years later returned with his wife and children to the United States in the 1950s, settling in Texas. This was the beginning of his experience as a farmworker over a 15-year period of fieldwork that included many migratory moves between the states of California and Texas, working in cotton and orange fields and whatever else was in season. Later, when Simón and his family picked up contract labor work, he picked strawberries in the central coast region of California at the age of 9. Due to the seasonal farmwork they followed, Simón moved constantly and never fully settled for long periods of time in one place. For his parents, this pattern continued until their retirement in 1985.

=== Education ===
Simon Salinas finally settled permanently in the city of Watsonville, California, at the age of 18, so that he could focus on his education. He graduated from Watsonville High School in 1974, and then went on to Claremont McKenna College to receive a Bachelor of Arts in Political Science and Latin American Studies in 1978. In 1981, Simón earned a Bilingual Teaching Credential from San Jose State University and in 1984 graduated with a J.D. from Santa Clara University Law School in California.

=== Teaching ===
Salinas credits his motivation in seeking a higher education to his parents, who instilled in him the motivation to succeed. He points to the example set by his father who, without any formal education, taught himself to read and write. It was this fact that encouraged Salinas to take advantage of the educational opportunities his parents were never given.

Salinas was a bilingual 6th grade teacher at Bardin Elementary School in east Salinas. He became a professor at Hartnell College, in Salinas, from 1989 through 1993.

== Local politics ==
Salinas began his public service career in June 1989 when he was elected as the first Mexican-American to serve on the Salinas City Council. During his tenure with the City of Salinas, Mr. Salinas served as Mayor Pro-Tem. Salinas was first elected to the Monterey County Board of Supervisors in 1993, representing District One, and was reelected in 1997. During his second term, he was elected chair of the board and was the first Mexican-American to serve on the Monterey County Board of Supervisors in over 100 years.

== State legislature ==
In 2000, Salinas ran for the California state Assembly. After winning the Democratic primary, he won an expensive, hard-fought general election against Republican Jeff Denham, who went on to be elected state Senator in 2002. Salinas was sworn in to represent the 28th District in the California State Assembly on December 4, 2000. He authored legislation addressing issues in affordable housing, agriculture, healthcare, public safety, transportation, local government, and education. For his legislative efforts on these and other issues, he was named "Legislator of the Year" by a few organizations that include Skills USA-VICA, California Transit Association, the League of California Cities, and the American Planning Association.

In Salinas's first year in the Legislature, he sent 11 bills to the Governor and 9 were signed into law. Salinas served as the Chair of the Local Government Committee and as a Member of the Agriculture, Education, Health and Housing, Community Development Committees and other non-profit organization. He was Chair of the Select Committee on Rural Economic Development and vice president and co-founder of Caminos Del Arte, a non-profit organization that provides services for at-risk youth.

As an assembly member, Salinas was a supporter of the 2006 bond measures. He was also a supporter of raising taxes, universal healthcare, improving social services, closing loopholes in Proposition 13, and independent redistricting.

== Return to local politics ==
On January 9, 2007, Salinas became a Monterey County Supervisor, this time representing the 3rd district. He retired from the Board of Supervisors in 2019.
