= Robert C. Kirkwood =

American politician (1909–1964)

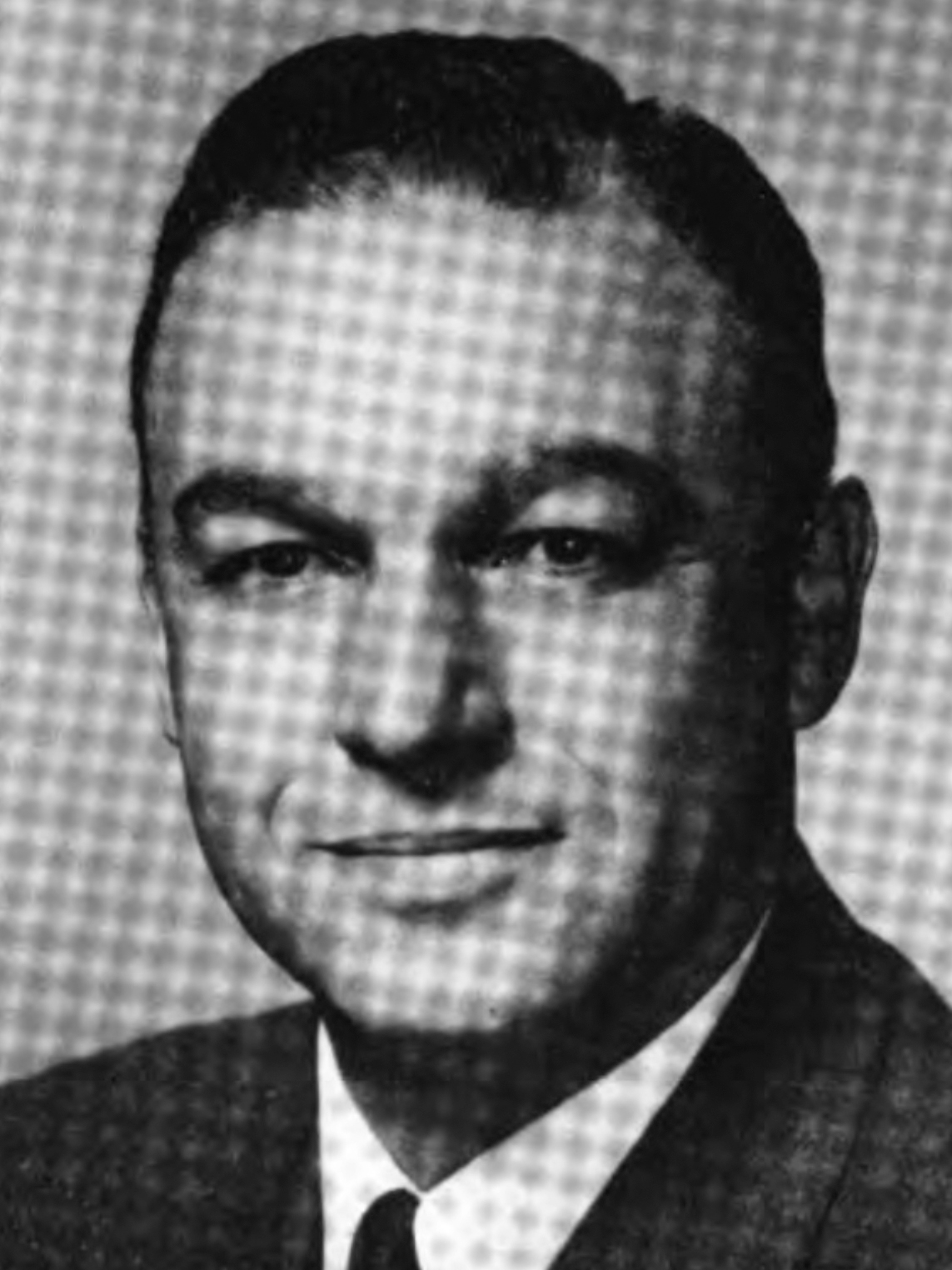
- Official portrait, 1958

24th Controller of California
- In office January 2, 1953 – January 5, 1959
- Governor: Earl Warren; Goodwin Knight
- Preceded by: Thomas Kuchel
- Succeeded by: Alan Cranston

Member of the California State Assembly from the 28th district
- In office January 6, 1947 – January 6, 1953
- Preceded by: Raup Miller
- Succeeded by: Clark L. Bradley

Personal details
- Born: August 30, 1909 Mountain View, California
- Died: May 5, 1964 (aged 54) San Francisco, California
- Party: Republican
- Spouse: Jean Hazard Gerlinder (m. 1933)
- Children: 4
- Education: Stanford University (BA); Harvard Law School (LLB)

Robert C. Kirkwood (August 30, 1909 – May 5, 1964) was an American politician who served as a member of the California State Assembly representing part of Santa Clara County from 1947 until 1953, when he resigned to accept an appointment as California State Controller by Governor Earl Warren. Kirkwood was elected to a full term in 1954, but lost a re-election bid in 1958 to Alan Cranston, who later became a United States senator.

Born in Mountain View, California, Kirkwood married Jean Hazard Gerlinger on August 30, 1933. They went on to have four children—two daughters and two sons.

In 1959, Kirkwood was appointed Utilities General Manager of the San Francisco Water Department. He died in San Francisco in 1964. The Water Department named a hydroelectric plant in Alpine County after Kirkwood, and the plant came online in 1967. Also, the Robert C Kirkwood Entrance At Castle Rock State Park opened in August 2019.

Kirkwood's son, Bob Kirkwood, was appointed by Governor Arnold Schwarzenegger to the Sierra Nevada Conservancy in 2005.

Political offices
Preceded by Raup Miller	California State Assemblyman, 28th District; 1947-1953	Succeeded by Clark L. Bradley
Preceded by Thomas Kuchel	California State Controller; 1953–1959	Succeeded by Alan Cranston
