= Peter Frusetta =

American politician

Member of the California State Assembly from the 28th district
- In office December 5, 1994 – November 30, 2000
- Preceded by: Rusty Areias
- Succeeded by: Simon Salinas

Personal details
- Born: July 6, 1932
- Died: February 26, 2020 (aged 87)
- Party: Republican
- Spouse: Anita Fillice (m. 1959)
- Children: 4

Military service
- Branch/service: United States Army

Peter Clay Frusetta (July 6, 1932 - February 26, 2020) was an American rancher and politician from California and was a member of the Republican party.

Frusetta served in the United States Army between 1954 and 1956. He was deployed in Germany. Upon his return from the war, he worked on his family's cattle ranch in San Benito County.

== State Assembly ==
Frusetta first ran for the California State Assembly in 1992, losing to entrenched incumbent Rusty Areias (D-Salinas) by 18 points. In 1994 he ran again for what was now an open seat (with Areias running instead for state controller). He beat Democrat Lily Cervantes by 389 votes. He beat her again in a 1996 rematch and served in the lower house until 2000.

In 2002 he made a run for redrawn 12th district in the state senate but lost in the GOP primary to Jeff Denham, who then went on to beat Democrat Rusty Areias in the general election.

== Electoral history ==
Member, California State Assembly: 1994-2000
Year	Office	Democrat	Votes	Pct	Republican	Votes	Pct
1992	California State Assembly; District 28	Rusty Areias	64,747	59%	Peter Frusetta	44,905	41%
1994	California State Assembly; District 28	Lily Cervantes	43,307	49.8%	Peter Frusetta	43,696	50.2%
1996	California State Assembly; District 28	Lily Cervantes	51,888	47.3%	Peter Frusetta	53,649	48.9%
1998	California State Assembly; District 28	Alan Styles	40,652	44%	Peter Frusetta	47,735	51.6%
2002	California State Senate; District 12	Rusty Areias	72,034	47.1%	Jeff Denham 57% Peter Frusetta 37.3%	73,887	48.3%
