= Bob Kirkwood =

American businessman (1939–2017)

- Born: June 17, 1939; San Francisco, California, U.S.
- Died: December 10, 2017 (aged 78); Palo Alto, California, U.S.
- Education: Pomona College; Harvard Law School

Bob Kirkwood (June 17, 1939 - December 10, 2017) was an American environmentalist and businessman. Kirkwood was born in San Francisco, California, on June 17, 1939, the eldest son of California politician Robert C. Kirkwood.

Kirkwood was a graduate of Pomona College and Harvard Law School. After two years in Japan working for a law firm, he returned to San Francisco, where he practiced law at Brobeck, Phleger & Harrison. Kirkwood then worked at Hewlett-Packard for 25 years, retiring as Director of Government and Education Affairs. Working with David Packard, Kirkwood designed and initiated the creation of the Santa Clara Manufacturing Group, a collaboration of industry and local governments that has evolved into the Silicon Valley Leadership Group.

Kirkwood served as a board contributor to many civic and environmental organizations including Peninsula Open Space Trust, the California Advisory Board of the Trust for Public Land, SPUR, POST, Sempervirens, Planning and Conservation League Foundation, and the Northern Sierra Partnership. In the 1990s, he was a member and chairman of the California Coastal Conservancy and in 2005 he was the governor's appointee to the newly created Sierra Nevada Conservancy.

Kirkwood also pursued funding both environmental and childhood development issues working through his family foundation.

Kirkwood died on December 10, 2017, in Palo Alto, California.
