= Clarence J. Tauzer =

American lawyer and politician

Member of the California Senate from the 12th district
- In office November 19, 1947 – September 6, 1948
- Preceded by: Herbert W. Slater
- Succeeded by: Farley Presley Abshire

Personal details
- Born: July 7, 1897 Gilroy, California, U.S.
- Died: September 6, 1948 (aged 51) San Francisco, California, U.S.
- Party: Republican

Military service
- Branch/service: United States Army
- Battles/wars: World War I World War II

Clarence Jaurgen "Red" Tauzer (July 7, 1897 – September 6, 1948) was an American lawyer, politician, and junior college sports coach.

Tauzer was born on July 7, 1897, in Gilroy, California. He moved with family to Duncans Mills in 1905 and then in 1907 to Willits, California, where he graduated from Willits High School. Tauzer entered Stanford University in 1916. During World War I, he enlisted in the United States Army and attended officer's training school at Camp Fremont. He was discharged from the army as a first lieutenant.

Tauzer graduated from Stanford in 1923, and moved to Santa Rosa, California, where he joined the law first of Geary and Geary. He later became a partner in the firm, which was renamed Geary and Tauzer. In 1923, Tauzer was also appointed the football coach at Santa Rosa Junior College (SRJC). He also coached basketball, baseball, and track and field at the school.

Tauzer was elected to the SRJC board in 1930. He resigned from the board in 1942 when he entered the Army Judge Advocate Corps. His law partner, Finlay Gearly, served in his place until he returned and resumed his place on the board. Tauzer resigned a second time in 1948. Tauzer became a member of the California State Senate in 1947. He filled a seat vacated by the death of Herbert W. Slater.

Tauzer died on September 6, 1948, at Mount Zion Hospital in San Francisco. He had suffered a heart attack five days earlier while attending the state convention of the American Legion.
