= Anthony Cannella =

American politician

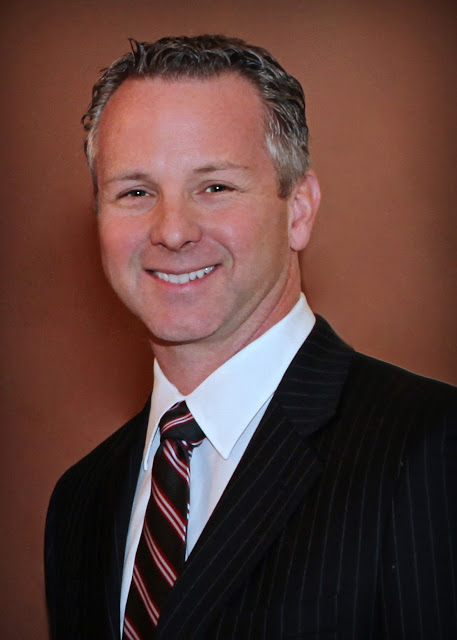

Member of the California State Senate from the 12th district
- In office December 6, 2010 – November 30, 2018
- Preceded by: Jeff Denham
- Succeeded by: Anna Caballero

Mayor of Ceres, California
- In office December 2, 2005 – December 6, 2010
- Preceded by: DeLinda Moore
- Succeeded by: Chris Vierra

Personal details
- Born: Anthony Joseph Cannella; March 22, 1969 (age 57) New Idria, California, U.S.
- Party: Republican
- Spouse: Julie Cannella (m. 1996)
- Relations: Sal Cannella (father)
- Children: 4
- Education: University of California, Davis
- Occupation: Civil engineer Small business owner

Anthony Joseph Cannella (born March 22, 1969) is an American politician who previously served in the California State Senate. A Republican, he represented the 12th Senate District, which encompasses all of both Merced and San Benito counties, as well as parts of Fresno, Madera, Monterey, and Stanislaus counties. Prior to his election to the State Senate, he served as the mayor of Ceres.

He is the son of Sal Cannella, a former Democratic Assemblymember who also represented portions of the Central Valley.

== Biography ==
Anthony Cannella was elected to the State Senate in 2010, defeating state Assemblywoman Anna Caballero in a surprise, with assistance from the California Chamber of Commerce, and easily re-elected in 2014 as one of few Republicans endorsed by the California Labor Federation.

In April 2017, he was the only Republican Senator to vote in favor of Senate Bill 1, the Road Repair & Accountability Act of 2017 (more widely known and reported as the "Gas Tax"); he was promised transportation assistance for the University of California, Merced, and an extension of the Altamont Corridor Express rail line to his district.

The Senate bill includes a 20-cent per gallon increase in diesel taxes, a 12-cent per gallon hike in gas taxes and a 5.75 percent increase in diesel sales taxes. Vehicle license fees would be raised an average $38 per vehicle. Drivers would also face a new annual fee to be paid with their vehicle registration, ranging from $25 to $175 depending on the value of their vehicle. The taxes and fees rise each year with inflation. Funds would be used to improve roads, highways and transportation systems in California.

== Electoral history ==
=== 2010 ===
California State Senate elections, 2010
Party	Candidate	Votes	%
Republican	Anthony Cannella	92,270	51.5
Democratic	Anna Caballero	86,923	48.5
Total votes		179,193	100.0
Republican hold			

=== 2014 ===
California's 12th State Senate district election, 2014
Primary election
Party	Candidate	Votes	%
Republican	Anthony Cannella (incumbent)	47,551	63.8
Democratic	Shawn K. Bagley	27,017	36.2
Total votes		74,568	100.0
General election
Republican	Anthony Cannella (incumbent)	54,039	62.0
Democratic	Shawn K. Bagley	33,059	38.0
Total votes		87,098	100.0
Republican hold			
