= Joseph A. Rattigan =

American politician

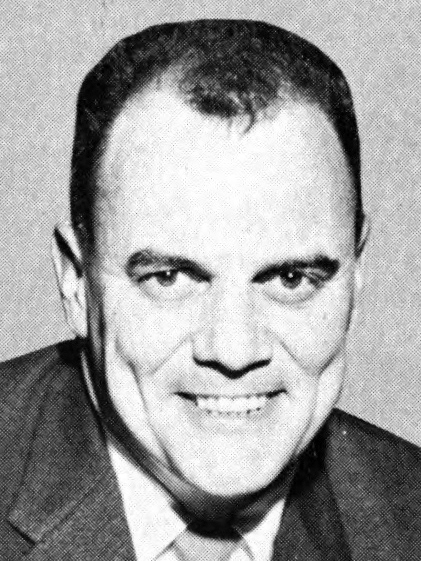

Member of the California Senate from the 12th district
- In office January 5, 1959 – January 2, 1967
- Preceded by: Farley Presley Abshire
- Succeeded by: Richard J. Dolwig

Personal details
- Born: January 24, 1920 Washington, D.C., U.S.
- Died: May 12, 2007 (aged 87) Santa Rosa, California, U.S.
- Party: Democratic
- Spouse: Betty Gubisch (m. 1943)
- Children: 6

Military service
- Branch/service: United States Navy
- Battles/wars: World War II

Joseph Austin Rattigan (January 24, 1920 – May 12, 2007) served in the California State Senate for the 12th district from 1959 to 1967, as a Justice of the District Court of Appeals from 1966 to 1984, and during World War II he served in the United States Navy.
