= Herbert W. Slater =

American politician from California

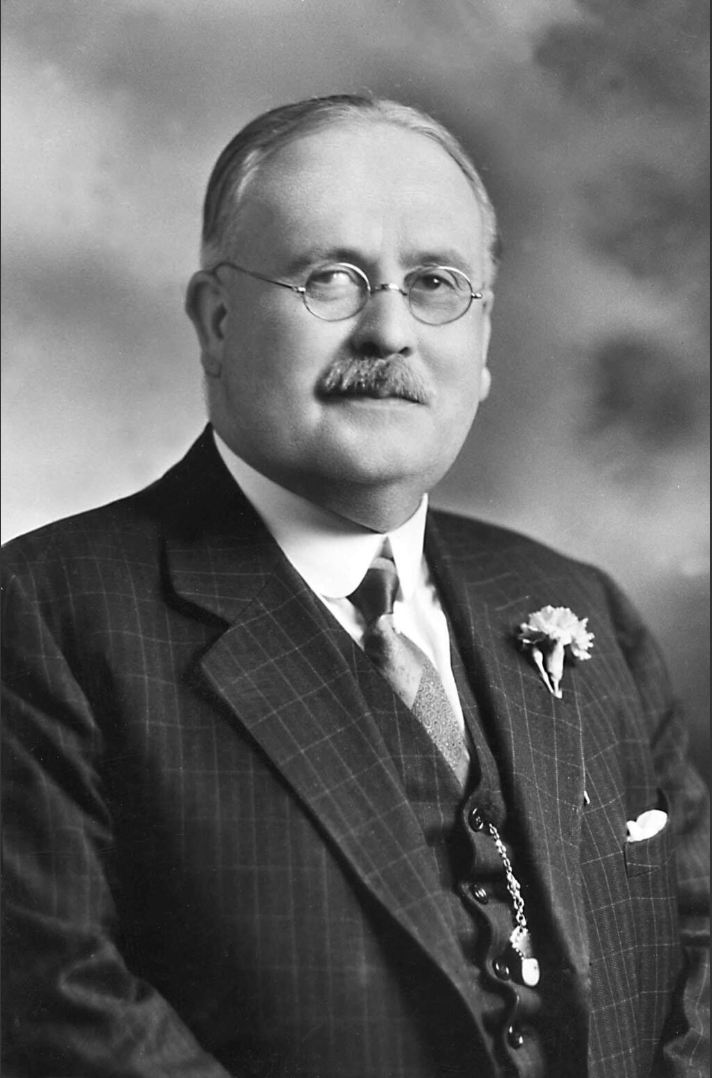

Member of the California Senate
- In office January 5, 1915 – August 13, 1947
- Preceded by: James Charles Garrison
- Succeeded by: Clarence J. Tauzer
- Constituency: 8th district (1915-1931); 12th district (1931-1947)

Member of the California Assembly
- In office January 6, 1910 – January 4, 1915
- Preceded by: James W. Hamilton
- Succeeded by: George W. Salisbury
- Constituency: 13th district

Personal details
- Born: 20 August 1874 Hereford, England
- Died: 13 August 1947 (aged 72) Santa Rosa, California, United States
- Party: Democratic

Herbert W. Slater (August 20, 1874 – August 13, 1947) was an English-born American newspaper publisher and long-time legislator in California. After an accident in 1919, Slater lost his eyesight, however, went on to serve in California politics for nearly thirty years afterward, earning him the nickname "the Blind Senator."

== Early life and career ==
Slater was born on August 20, 1874 in the city of Hereford in the west of England. His father was a clergyman of the Church of England. He completed his early education in England.

During the early 1890s, Slater emigrated to the United States, briefly living in New York City; New Orleans; and Monterey, California. In 1892 he moved to Santa Rosa where he took a job as a ranch-hand in Fulton.

Shortly after his arrival, Slater began working as a crank operator on the newspaper press for the Sonoma Press Democrat. By 1894 he became the paper's editor, serving in that capacity until 1911 when the paper merged with Ernest L. Finley's The Press Democrat. Slater would continue to write for the newspaper for the rest of his life. Slater befriended the local horticulturist Luther Burbank, and frequently wrote about his agricultural experiments, earning Slater several national publications and contributing to Burbank's eventual international fame.

During World War I, Slater served as chairman of the Federal District Draft Board in California.

== California State Legislature ==
On January 6, 1910, Slater was elected to the California State Assembly, representing Sonoma County in the 13th district. He served for two terms.

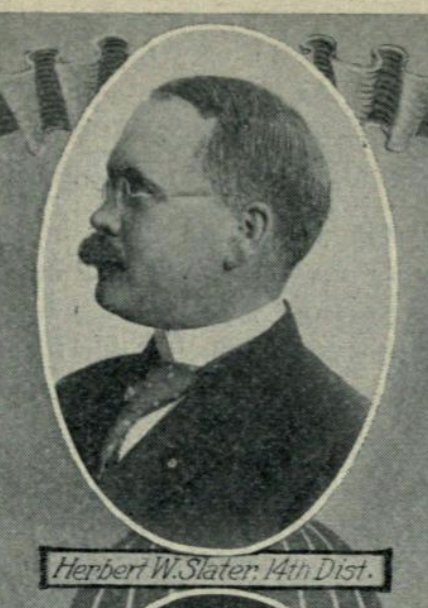
Herbert Slater California Assembly portrait (1911)

In 1915, Slater was elected to the California State Senate, first representing the 8th district. In 1931 he would be restricted to serve the 12th district. Originally elected as a Democrat, for various periods throughout his time in office Slater was also at times a Progressive Socialist and a Republican, switching between the three at various periods, until returning to the Democratic Party. Historian Gaye LeBaron writes that, "[Slater] must switched sides in the Senate chamber so often the clerks thought he was a ping pong ball. But he always ran as Senator Slater. And that was enough."

As Slater grew older, his eyes began to develop cataracts, and in 1919 he suffered a serious injury when, while working on his automobile, he accidentally struck both of his eyes on the wire wheel-spokes, leaving him completely blind for the rest of his life.

Despite his blindness, Slater continued to serve in the California Legislature and write for The Press Democrat, dictating his articles to his secretary each day. Despite his lack of eyesight, he is said to have been able to still distinguish friends and individuals by the distinct sounds of their footsteps. His desk at the newspaper served both for his work as an editor and political columnist and his district office.

As a senator he campaigned for legislation to support the handicapped; workmen's compensation; child protection; education; and social welfare causes. In 1933, Slater wrote the legislation that established the California Agricultural Code (amended in 1972 as the California Food and Agriculture Code); and in 1943 the California Education Code. He became Dean of the California Legislature in 1946.

== Death and legacy ==
Slater died of a heart attack while walking to his Santa Rosa office on August 13, 1947. Upon his death, Governor Earl Warren said "California has lost the service of an able, warm-hearted and beloved citizen and legislator."

Slater never married or had any children. He was known to be fond of gourmet dining.

Herbert Slater Junior High School in Santa Rosa, which operated from 1954 to 2025, was named in his honor. A scholarship at the Santa Rosa Junior College is also named for him.
