= Martin Kelly (politician) =

American politician (1842–1890)

Member of the California Senate from the 12th district
- In office January 5, 1880 – January 3, 1887
- Preceded by: M. J. Donovan
- Succeeded by: Augustus Lemuel Chandler

Personal details
- Born: 1842 Birr, Ireland
- Died: May 30, 1890 (aged 48) Oakland, California, U.S.
- Party: Workingmen's (before 1881); Democratic (after 1881)
- Occupation: Carriagemaker, politician

Martin Kelly (1842 – May 30, 1890) was an Irish American carriagemaker and politician who served in the California State Senate from 1880 to 1887. He previously served as deputy tax collector for the city of San Francisco, and later served as assistant chief wharfinger of the State Board of Harbor Commissioners from 1883 until his death in 1890.

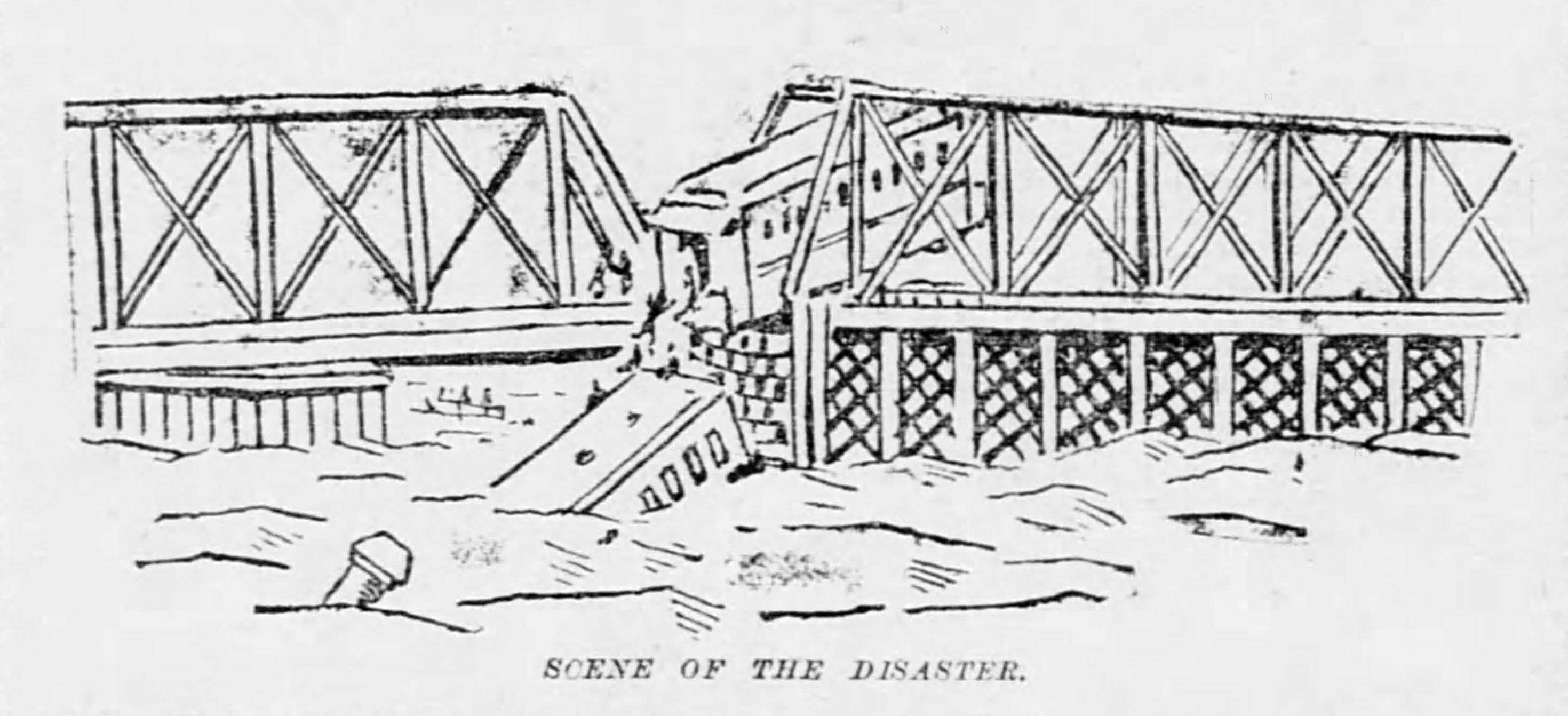
An illustration of the bridge disaster published in The San Francisco Call, May 31, 1890

Kelly died on May 30, 1890 when the train he was riding from San Francisco to Oakland plunged through the open Webster Street Drawbridge into the Oakland Estuary. He and 12 others drowned while a rescue party tried and failed to break into the car.
