= Clark L. Bradley =

American politician (1908–1983)

Member of the California Senate from the 14th district
- In office January 2, 1967 - November 30, 1974
- Preceded by: Gene McAteer
- Succeeded by: George N. Zenovich

Member of the California Senate from the 18th district
- In office January 7, 1963 - January 2, 1967
- Preceded by: John F. Thompson
- Succeeded by: Walter W. Stiern

Member of the California State Assembly from the 28th district
- In office April 6, 1953 - January 7, 1963
- Preceded by: Robert C. Kirkwood
- Succeeded by: Jack T. Casey

Personal details
- Born: July 18, 1908 Topeka, Kansas, US
- Died: December 11, 1983 (aged 75) San Jose, California, US
- Party: Republican
- Spouses: Carol M. Brubaker (m. 1933; div. 1964); Della Bradfield (m. 1967)
- Children: 4

Military service
- Branch/service: United States Navy
- Battles/wars: World War II

Clark L. Bradley (July 18, 1908 – December 11, 1983) served in the California State Assembly for the 28th district from 1953 to 1963 and served in the California State Senate for the 18th and 14th district from 1963 to 1974. He was also mayor of San Jose, California. During World War II he served in the United States Navy.

== Personal life ==
Bradley was born in Topeka, Kansas and relocated to San Jose in 1918. Bradley was married 3 times. While in office as an Assemblymember, he married his administrative assistant, Della Bradfield. He had four children with his first wife Carol.

== Career ==
After graduating from San Jose State University and University of California, Hastings College of the Law Bradley served in the United States Navy during World War II as a Lieutenant-Commander. He became an attorney and began working in politics.

== Political views ==
He was described as a staunchly conservative Republican for his anti-Equal Rights Amendment stance and his opposition to legislation that would enable action on air pollution in California. He also led the opposition on a bill that would increase consumer protections by making product warranties enforceable. He was ‘blacklisted’ by then Governor Ronald Reagan for being the lone Republican vote opposing a tax bill which resulted in it failing to pass. Bradley also was against reducing the voting age from 21 to 18 in the United States.

Political offices
Preceded by Parker Hathaway	Mayor of San Jose; 1952–1954	Succeeded by Fred Watson (mayor)
