= Dennis Cardoza =

American politician (born 1959)

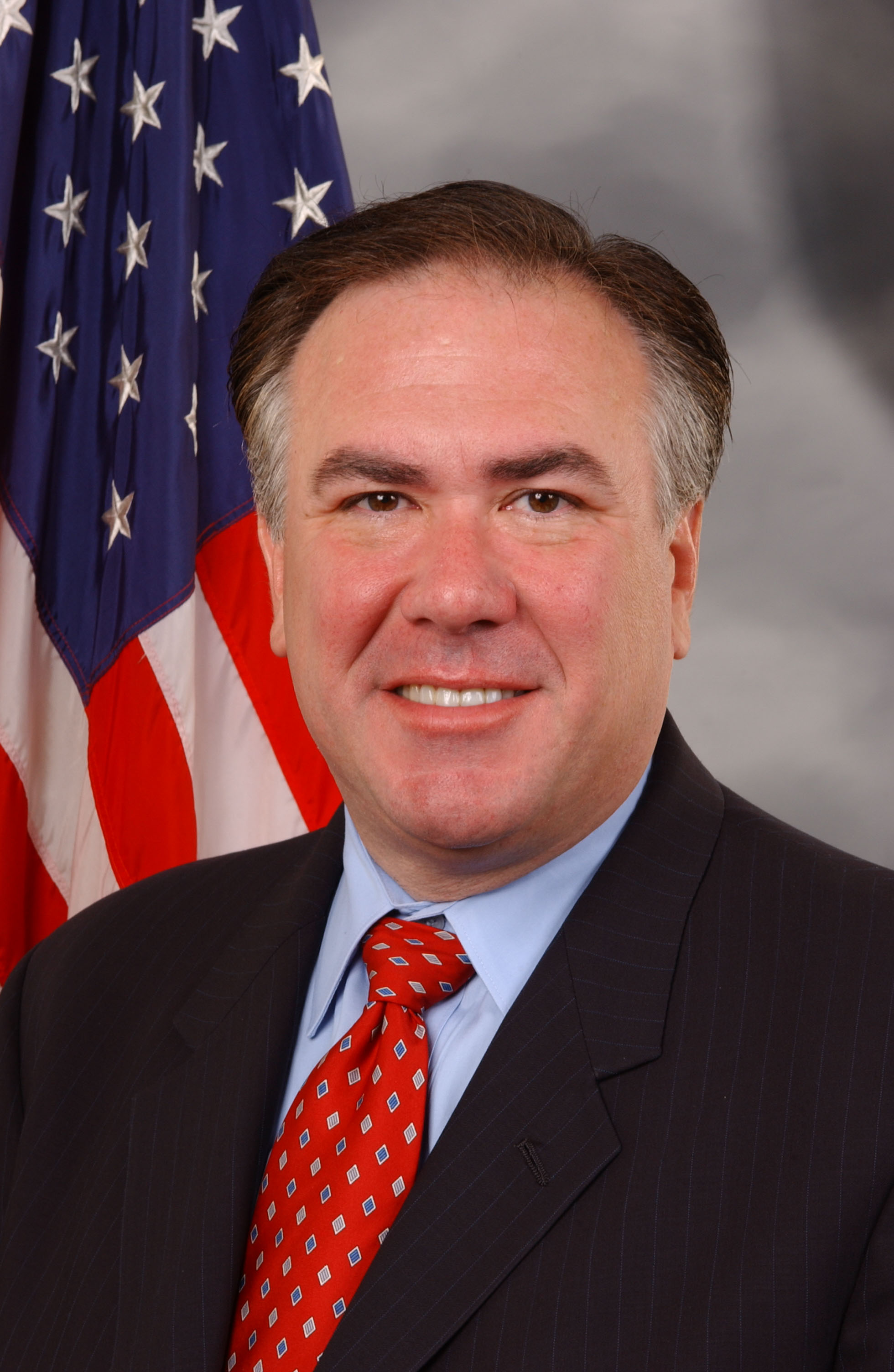
- Official portrait, 2004

Member of the U.S. House of Representatives from California's 18th district
- In office January 3, 2003 – August 15, 2012
- Preceded by: Gary Condit
- Succeeded by: Anna Eshoo (redistricted)

Member of the California State Assembly from the 26th district
- In office December 2, 1996 – November 30, 2002
- Preceded by: Sal Cannella
- Succeeded by: Greg Aghazarian

Personal details
- Born: Dennis Alan Cardoza; March 31, 1959 (age 67) Merced, California, U.S.
- Party: Democratic
- Spouse: Kathie McLoughlin
- Education: California State University, Stanislaus; University of Maryland, College Park (BA)

Dennis Alan Cardoza GOIH (born March 31, 1959) is an American politician who served as the U.S. representative for California's 18th congressional district from 2003 to 2012. The district took in a large swath of the Central Valley, from Stockton to Fresno. He is a member of the Democratic Party. On October 20, 2011, he announced he would retire from Congress at the end of 2012.

He first won election to Congress after defeating Congressman Gary Condit in the March 2002 Democratic Party primary election.

== Early life ==
Cardoza was born in Merced, California, of Portuguese ancestry. He grew up in Atwater, California, and graduated from Atwater High School. He was educated at California State University, Stanislaus in Turlock, California, then transferred to the University of Maryland, College Park. He is a member of Theta Chi fraternity.

== Political career ==
Cardoza's interest in public service began in college when he interned on Capitol Hill during the summer of 1979. The first in his family to graduate from college, Cardoza went on to run a successful small business. Cardoza served as a city council member in both Merced and Atwater and was a member of the California State Assembly from 1996 to 2002. During his six years in the Assembly, he chaired the Rules Committee and helped found the Moderate Democratic Caucus.

== Congress ==
Cardoza represented California's 18th Congressional District in the U.S. House of Representatives. The seat was previously held by Gary Condit. When Cardoza was starting out in politics, he served as Condit's chief of staff while Condit was still in the California Assembly. When Condit's career came under a cloud because of his extramarital affair with murdered intern Chandra Levy, Cardoza ran against him in the 2002 Democratic primary and won. Cardoza then faced Republican State Senator Dick Monteith in the November election. This race was considered to be the only potentially competitive House contest in California; redistricting after the 2000 census gave most of the state's 53 congresspersons safe districts. However, the Democratic-controlled state legislature had been concerned about a growing Republican trend in the 18th even before Condit's career imploded. The district and its predecessors had been in Democratic hands since 1955 and remained that way until the election of Republican John Duarte to Congress in 2022. The legislature shifted a Republican-leaning portion of eastern Stanislaus County to the heavily Republican 19th District. They replaced it with a mostly Democratic spur in and around Stockton, which gave the district a plurality of Latino voters. Cardoza defeated Monteith, 51 percent to 43 percent. He was reelected four times against only nominal opposition.

Cardoza was considered a conservative Democrat by California standards, which is typical for Democrats from the Central Valley. However, his voting record was slightly more liberal than that of Condit. During the 109th Congress, Cardoza was a co-chair of the Blue Dog Coalition, a group of moderate to conservative House Democrats of which Condit was a founding member. He was a member of the Resources Committee, Agriculture Committee, and International Relations Committee.

For the 112th Congress, Cardoza sat on the House Committee on Foreign Affairs, as well as the Agriculture Committee where he was ranking member of the Livestock, Dairy and Poultry Subcommittee. He remained a member of the Blue Dog Coalition, but his co-chairmanship was assumed by Congressman Mike Ross.

=== Retirement ===
Media accounts suggest that Cardoza's decision to retire stemmed from the 2012 redistricting map, which put his hometown of Merced in the same district as fellow Blue Dog Jim Costa. Meanwhile, the reconfigured 10th, which included much of Cardoza's old district, was won by Republican Jeff Denham.

He resigned from Congress effective August 15, 2012, citing family concerns as a priority, and joined the law firm Foley & Lardner LLP in a public affairs and lobbying role.

=== Committee assignments ===
- Committee on Agriculture
  - Subcommittee on General Farm Commodities and Risk Management
  - Subcommittee on Livestock, Dairy, and Poultry
- Committee on Foreign Affairs
  - Subcommittee on Asia and the Pacific
  - Subcommittee on the Middle East and South Asia

=== Caucus memberships ===
- Congressional Hispanic Caucus
- International Conservation Caucus
- Moderate Democratic Caucus
- Sportsmen's Caucus

== Honors ==
- Grand-Officer of the Order of Prince Henry, Portugal (8 June 2012)

== Electoral history ==
2002 United States House of Representatives elections in California
Party	Candidate	Votes	%
Democratic	Dennis Cardoza	56,181	51.3
Republican	Dick Monteith	47,528	43.4
American Independent	Kevin H. Cripe	3,641	3.3
Libertarian	Linda De Groat	2,194	2.0
No party	Donna Crowder (write-in)	49	0.0
Turnout		109,593	
Democratic hold			

2004 United States House of Representatives elections in California
Party	Candidate	Votes	%
Democratic	Dennis Cardoza (incumbent)	103,732	67.5
Republican	Charles F. Pringle Sr.	49,973	32.5
Total votes		153,705	100.0
Turnout			
Democratic hold			

2006 United States House of Representatives elections in California
Party	Candidate	Votes	%
Democratic	Dennis Cardoza (incumbent)	71,182	65.5
Republican	John A. Kanno	37,531	34.5
Total votes		108,713	100.0
Turnout			
Democratic hold			

2008 United States House of Representatives elections in California
Party	Candidate	Votes	%
Democratic	Dennis Cardoza (incumbent)	130,192	100.0
Total votes		130,192	100.0
Turnout			
Democratic hold			

2010 United States House of Representatives elections in California
Party	Candidate	Votes	%
Democratic	Dennis Cardoza (incumbent)	72,853	58.48
Republican	Michael Clare Berryhill Sr.	51,716	41.52
Total votes		124,569	100.00
Turnout			
Democratic hold			

U.S. House of Representatives
Preceded by Gary Condit	Member of the U.S. House of Representatives from California's 18th congressional district 2003–2012	Succeeded by Anna Eshoo
Party political offices
Preceded by Baron Hill	Chair of the Blue Dog Coalition for Communications; 2005–2007; Served alongside: Jim Matheson (Administration), Jim Cooper (Policy)	Succeeded by Mike Ross
U.S. order of precedence (ceremonial)
Preceded by Douglas Bosco as Former U.S. Representative	Order of precedence of the United States as Former U.S. Representative	Succeeded by Jeff Denham as Former U.S. Representative
