= Luis Alejo =

American politician (born 1974)

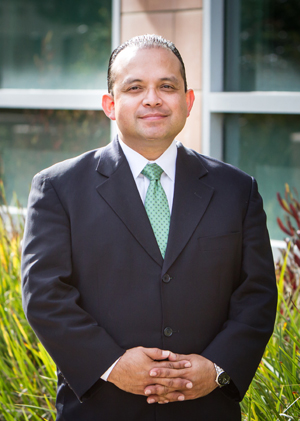

Chair of Monterey County
- In office January 10, 2023 – January 9, 2024
- Preceded by: Mary L. Adams
- Succeeded by: Glenn Church

Member of the Monterey County Board of Supervisors from the 1st District
- Incumbent
- Assumed office January 3, 2017
- Preceded by: Fernando Armenta

Member of the California State Assembly from the 30th district 28th district (2010–2012)
- In office December 6, 2010 – November 30, 2016
- Preceded by: Anna Caballero
- Succeeded by: Anna Caballero

Mayor of Watsonville, California
- In office November 17, 2009 – November 30, 2010
- Preceded by: Anthony Rivas
- Succeeded by: Daniel Dodge

Member of the Watsonville City Council from the 2nd District
- In office December 4, 2008 – November 30, 2010
- Preceded by: Oscar Rios
- Succeeded by: Oscar Rios

Personal details
- Born: Luis Angel Alejo; March 27, 1974 (age 52) Watsonville, California, U.S.
- Party: Democratic
- Education: University of California, Berkeley (BA); Harvard University (MEd); University of California Davis (JD)

Luis Angel Alejo (born March 27, 1974) is an American politician who served in the California State Assembly representing the 30th Assembly District, encompassing the Pajaro and Salinas valleys. He has served as a supervisor for Monterey County since 2017.

== Biography ==
=== Early life ===
Born and raised in Watsonville, Alejo's family came to work in the agricultural fields of the Salinas, Santa Clara and Pajaro Valleys as migrant farmworkers in the 1950s.

Alejo graduated from the University of California, Berkeley with dual bachelor's degrees in political science and Chicano studies, and obtained his master's of education degree from Harvard University in administration, planning and social policy. He received his Juris Doctor (JD) from the University of California, Davis School of Law (King Hall), where he won the "Maggie Schelen" scholarship for public service.

After finishing his graduate and professional studies, Alejo returned to his hometown of Watsonville to work as a legal aid attorney where he championed the rights of working families throughout the Monterey Bay area. He then worked as a staff attorney for the Monterey County Superior Court, where he assisted thousands of self-represented litigants throughout Monterey County who couldn't afford private attorneys. He has also worked as a high school teacher, focusing on "at-risk" children.

=== Career ===
Before his election to the State Legislature, Alejo was the mayor of Watsonville, California. He was elected to District 2 of the Watsonville City Council with nearly 80% of the vote and became mayor in November 2009. He had become Vice Mayor in March 2009.

Prior to his public service, Alejo served as a Jesse M. Unruh Assembly Fellow where he worked as a legislative aide for Assemblymember Manny Diaz (D-San Jose). He attended the University of California, Berkeley, the University of California, Davis School of Law (King Hall), and Harvard University.

Alejo was elected in June 2016 to represent District 1 on the Monterey County Board of Supervisors.

== 2014 California State Assembly ==
California's 30th State Assembly district election, 2014
Primary election
Party	Candidate	Votes	%
Democratic	Luis Alejo (incumbent)	25,441	58.9
Republican	Mark Starritt	17,730	41.1
Total votes		43,171	100.0
General election
Democratic	Luis Alejo (incumbent)	43,431	59.8
Republican	Mark Starritt	29,187	40.2
Total votes		72,618	100.0
Democratic hold			
