= Dan McCorquodale =

American politician (born 1934)

Member of the California Senate from the 12th district
- In office December 6, 1982 – November 30, 1994
- Preceded by: Dan O'Keefe
- Succeeded by: Dick Monteith

Personal details
- Born: December 17, 1934 (age 91) Longville, Louisiana, U.S.
- Party: Democratic
- Spouse: Jean Adrian Botsford (m. 1969)
- Children: 3

Military service
- Branch/service: United States Marine Corps

Daniel Alfred McCorquodale, Jr. (born December 17, 1934) is an American politician from Newton, Texas, a former California State Senator, and a member of the Democratic Party.

== Early life ==
McCorquodale was born on December 17, 1934, in Longville, Louisiana. In 1946, his father moved the family to Newton, Texas. McCorquodale graduated from Newton High School in 1952. He was in the U.S. Marine Corps from 1953 to 1956, rising to Sergeant, after which he went to college and worked as a rancher and a teacher.

== Early political career ==
In 1960, McCorquodale registered for an eight-week course in "practical politics" with the National City Chamber of Commerce in National City, California.

In 1964, McCorquodale was the youngest person ever elected to the City Council in Chula Vista, where he served as Mayor from 1968 to 1969. Moving to San Jose, McCorquodale spent a year walking precincts—almost daily—to introduce himself to voters in Santa Clara County’s Third Supervisorial District. In 1972, "Walking Dan" as he was called upset an entrenched incumbent and was elected to three terms representing north and east San Jose, a portion of the City of Santa Clara, and the cities of Milpitas and Sunnyvale. Twice he served as Chairperson of the Santa Clara County Board of Supervisors. During his three terms on the Board, he distinguished himself in the issues of environmental protection, transportation, water reclamation, parks, justice, and health and human services.

== State Senate ==
In 1982, McCorquodale was elected to the San Jose-based 12th district in the California State Senate, narrowly defeating Republican incumbent Dan O'Keefe. In 1986, he won a difficult reelection against Santa Clara County Supervisor Tom Legan. Although he won easy reelection in 1990, McCorquodale lost his seat in 1994 to Dick Monteith a conservative Republican businessman. His senate district had shifted from his home base of San Jose into the more conservative Central Valley after reapportionment, partly leading to his defeat in a mid-term election in which the GOP made significant gains.

== Personal life ==
McCorquodale married Katherine Joan Rice in 1955.

== Awards and Honors ==
1986 - Legislator of the Year, California Trial Lawyers Association 1987 - Humanitarian of the Year, Humane Society 1988 – Legislator of the Year, California Planning and Conservation League 1991 – Legislator of the Year, National Organization for Women 1991 – Elected Official of the Year, California Governor’s Committee for Employment of Disabled Persons 1992 – Legislator of the Year, California Park and Recreation Society

Political offices
Preceded by Dan O'Keefe	California State Senate, 12th District; December 6, 1982–November 30, 1994	Succeeded by Dick Monteith
