= Gail Pellerin =

American politician (born 1962)

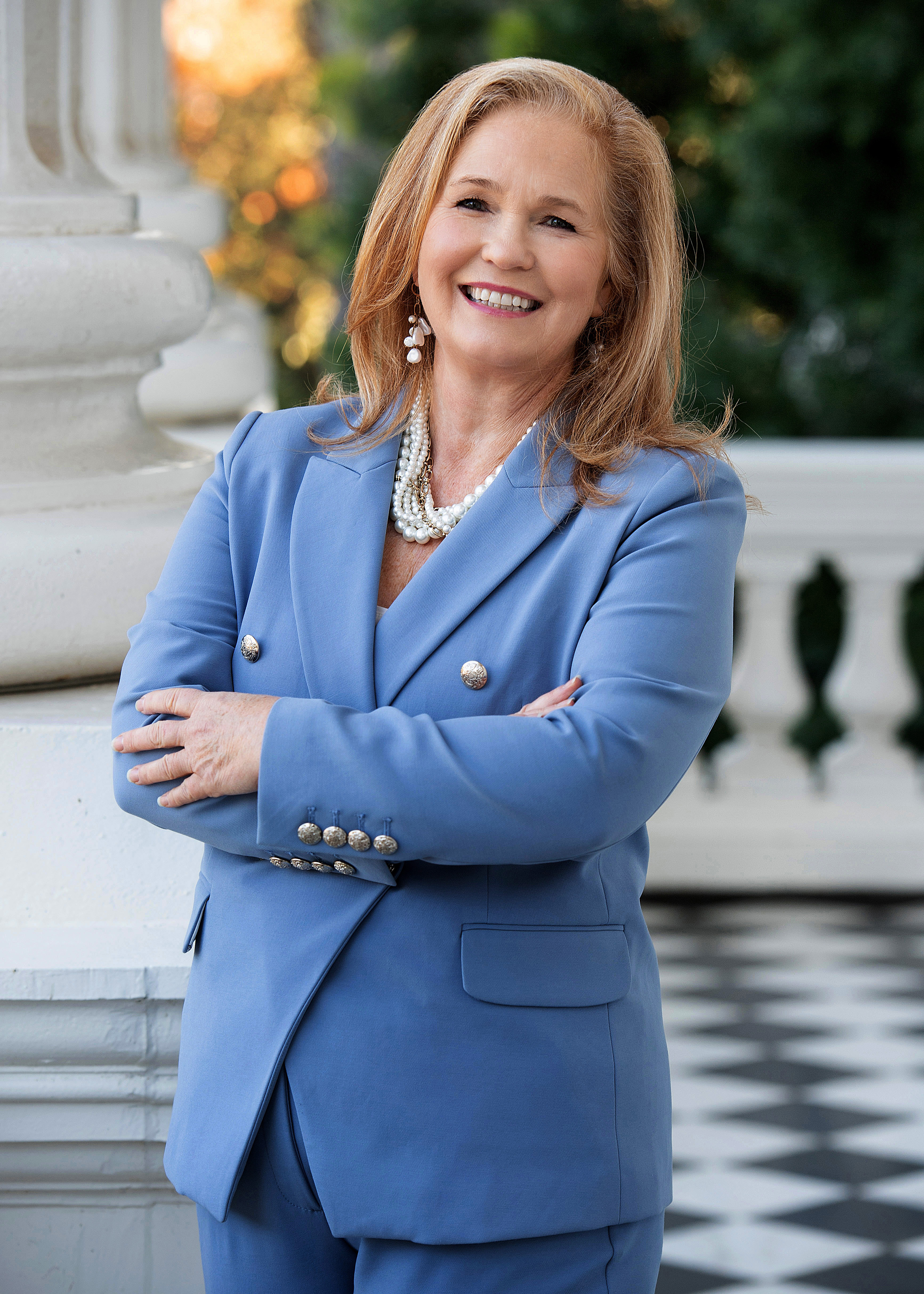
- Official portrait, 2022

Member of the California State Assembly from the 28th district
- Incumbent
- Assumed office December 5, 2022
- Preceded by: Mark Stone (redistricted)

Santa Cruz County Clerk
- In office 1993 – December 30, 2020
- Preceded by: Richard Bedal
- Succeeded by: Tricia Webber

Personal details
- Born: June 24, 1962 (age 64) Torrance, California, U.S.
- Party: Democratic
- Spouse: Tom Chaffin (m. 1992; died 2018)
- Children: 2
- Education: California Polytechnic State University (BS)

Gail L. Pellerin (born June 24, 1962) is an American election administrator and politician serving as a member of the California State Assembly from 28th district since 2022. The district includes about half of Santa Cruz County and part of Santa Clara County. She previously served as Santa Cruz County Clerk from 1993 until her retirement in 2020.

== Early life and education ==
Pellerin was born in Torrance, California. She graduated from California Polytechnic State University with a Bachelor of Science degree in journalism in 1984.

== Political career ==
=== Santa Cruz County Elections department ===
Pellerin spent more than 27 years working for the Santa Cruz County elections department from 1993 until her retirement in December 2020. She started as an elections manager then served as the county's clerk from 2004 until her retirement. She was unopposed in her elections as clerk. Pellerin served as President of the California Association of Clerks and Election Officials from 2010 to 2012 and as co-chair of the California Secretary of State’s Voting Accessibility Advisory Committee.

Pellerin twice served as an international election monitor in Nagorno-Karabakh, during the 2015 parliamentary and 2017 constitutional referendum elections.

=== California State Assembly ===
==== Elections ====
On the last day of candidate filing for the 2022 election, Pellerin filed to run for the California State Assembly in the 28th district, where incumbent Mark Stone had been redistricted from the 29th district and was term-limited. She placed first in the blanket primary with 35.9% of the vote and advanced to the general election against Republican former Monte Sereno mayor Liz Lawler. She defeated Lawler with 68% of the vote in the general election.

In the 2024 election, Pellerin again faced Lawler in a rematch. She defeated Lawler in the general election with 66.9% of the vote.

==== Tenure ====
In January 2024, Pellerin signed onto a California Legislative Jewish Caucus letter to fellow California state legislators asking for their "support and solidarity" following the October 7th attacks and a pro-Palestine demonstration by the Jewish Voice for Peace. As of July 2024, she was one four legislators who reported at least $1 million in stock market investments in financial disclosures.

In August 2025, Pellerin endorsed Proposition 50, part of the broader 2025-2026 United States redistricting effort.

== Personal life ==
Pellerin moved to Santa Cruz in 1993 and resides in unincorporated Santa Cruz County. She is Jewish. Her husband, Tom Chaffin, died by suicide while they underwent divorce proceedings in November 2018. They had two children, Jacob and Emily.

== Electoral history ==
=== 2022 ===
2022 California State Assembly 28th district election
Primary election
Party	Candidate	Votes	%
Democratic	Gail Pellerin	41,575	35.9
Republican	Liz Lawler	34,065	29.4
Democratic	Rob Rennie	28,592	24.7
Democratic	Joe Thompson	11,664	10.1
Total votes		115,896	100.0
General election
Democratic	Gail Pellerin	121,119	68.0
Republican	Liz Lawler	56,917	32.0
Total votes		178,036	100.0
Democratic hold			

=== 2024 ===
2024 California State Assembly 28th district election
Primary election
Party	Candidate	Votes	%
Democratic	Gail Pellerin (incumbent)	85,600	69.2
Republican	Liz Lawler	38,166	30.8
Total votes		123,766	100.0
General election
Democratic	Gail Pellerin (incumbent)	151,419	66.9
Republican	Liz Lawler	75,069	33.1
Total votes		226,488	100.0
Democratic hold			
