= Sonoran News =

Twice-monthly newspaper in Cave Creek, Arizona

- Type: Weekly newspaper
- Owner(s): Sonoran Sky Enterprises, LLC
- Founder: Donald Sorchych
- Founded: 1995
- Political alignment: Conservative
- Language: English
- Headquarters: 6702 E. Cave Creek Road, Suite 3., Cave Creek, Arizona, United States
- Website: sonorannews.com

Sonoran News was a Conservative community newspaper in Cave Creek, Arizona, United States.

== History ==
In 1995, retired tech executive Donald Sorchych founded the Sonoran News, a freely distributed weekly newspaper in Cave Creek, Arizona. The News was a rival of the Foothills Sentinel and teamed up with the Gila Bend Sun in order to qualify to run public notices.

Sorchych started the paper after town officials approved a large housing development that destroyed the pristine desert view from his hillside home. Over the years he turned his editorial focus toward Illegal immigration to the United States and criticized churches that provide resources to undocumented immigrants. By 2003, the News had a circulation of 37,000.

In 2010, amid the Great Recession, the paper reduced print publication from weekly newspaper to a twice-monthly and solicited donations from readers. In 2021, Sorchych died. In 2022, Sonoran Sky Enterprises, LLC purchased the assets, IP, and trade name from the Sorchych estate. The paper was later acquired by Independent Newsmedia, Inc. and renamed to the Cave Creek Independent.

== Controversies ==
In 2002, Sorchych was accused of cybersquatting on the domain of rival newspaper Foothills Chronicle to reduce its findability.

In 2009, the News successfully defended itself against a libel lawsuit from rival paper The Desert Advocate, which the News had referred to as the "Deadbeat Advocate", citing the owner's non-payment of back taxes.
