= Dan O'Keefe (politician) =

American politician (born 1929)

Member of the California Senate from the 12th district
- In office June 12, 1980 – November 30, 1982
- Preceded by: Jerry Smith
- Succeeded by: Dan McCorquodale

Personal details
- Born: October 21, 1929 Los Angeles, California, U.S.
- Party: Republican
- Spouse: Doris Wilson (m. 1958)
- Children: 2

Dan Patrick O'Keefe (born October 21, 1929) is an American politician. He is a former member of the California State Senate and the Cupertino City Council. He was the unsuccessful 1978 Republican nominee for Congress from California's 13th congressional district. He was first elected to the state Senate in a 1980 special election, easily defeating Santa Clara County Supervisor Rod Diridon Sr. and was narrowly defeated for re-election in 1982 by Santa Clara County Supervisor Dan McCorquodale.

== Electoral history ==
California's 13th District Congressional Election, November 7, 1978
Party	Candidate	Votes	%
Democratic	Norman Y. Mineta (incumbent)	100,809	57.49
Republican	Dan O'Keefe	69,306	39.52
Peace and Freedom	Robert Goldsborough III	5,246	2.99
Total votes		175,361	100.0
Turnout			
Democratic hold			

California's 12th District state Senate Special Election, June 3, 1980
Party	Candidate	Votes	%
Republican	Dan O'Keefe	82,523	52.72
Democratic	Rod Diridon Sr.	55,374	35.38
Libertarian	Bill White	18,625	11.90
Total votes		156,522	100.0
Turnout			
Republican hold			

California's 12th state Senate District Election, November 2, 1982
Party	Candidate	Votes	%
Democratic	Dan McCorquodale	80,604	48.69
Republican	Dan O'Keefe	76,327	46.11
Libertarian	Jim Wilson	8,613	5.20
Total votes		165,544	100.0
Turnout			
Democratic gain from Republican			
