= Sal Cannella (politician) =

American politician (born 1942)

Member of the California State Assembly from the 26th district
- In office December 7, 1992 – November 30, 1996
- Preceded by: Patrick Johnston
- Succeeded by: Dennis Cardoza

Member of the California State Assembly from the 27th district
- In office February 1, 1990 – November 30, 1992
- Preceded by: Gary Condit
- Succeeded by: Sam Farr

Personal details
- Born: September 23, 1942 (age 83) Newark, New Jersey, U.S.
- Party: Democratic
- Spouse: Donna
- Children: 3, including Anthony

Sal Cannella (born September 23, 1942) is an American politician who served as a member of the California State Assembly from 1990 to 1996.

== Early life ==
Cannella was born in 1942 in Newark, New Jersey. In 1953, he moved with his family to Stanislaus County, California. He graduated from Ceres High School in Ceres, California.

== Career ==
=== Local government ===
Cannella served on the Ceres City Council from 1976 until 1980 and as Mayor of Ceres from 1980 until 1982, when he was elected to the Stanislaus County Board of Supervisors. He was reelected to the board in 1986.

=== State Assembly ===
Canella was on track to win reelection again in 1990 when he decided to run for a special election for the California State Assembly that January. He won the race for the 27th district vacated by Democrat Gary Condit (who had been elected to Congress) and was reelected that November and again in 1992 and 1994 (in the renumbered 26th district).

=== 1998 State Senate race ===
Although California state term limits prevented Cannella from seeking reelection in 1996, he announced his candidacy for the California State Senate seat held by Republican Dick Monteith in 1998. Democrats (led by then President Pro Tem John Burton) campaigned for Cannella, who lost the election with 44% of votes cast.

== Personal life ==
Cannella and his wife Donna have three children: Nicole, Anthony and Vincent. In 2010, Anthony Cannella, was elected state senator for the 12th district as a Republican.

California Assembly
Preceded by Gary Condit	California State Assembly, 27th District; 1990–1992	Succeeded by Sam Farr
Preceded by Patrick Johnston	California State Assembly, 26th District; 1992–1996	Succeeded by Dennis Cardoza
