= Jeff Denham =

American politician (born 1967)

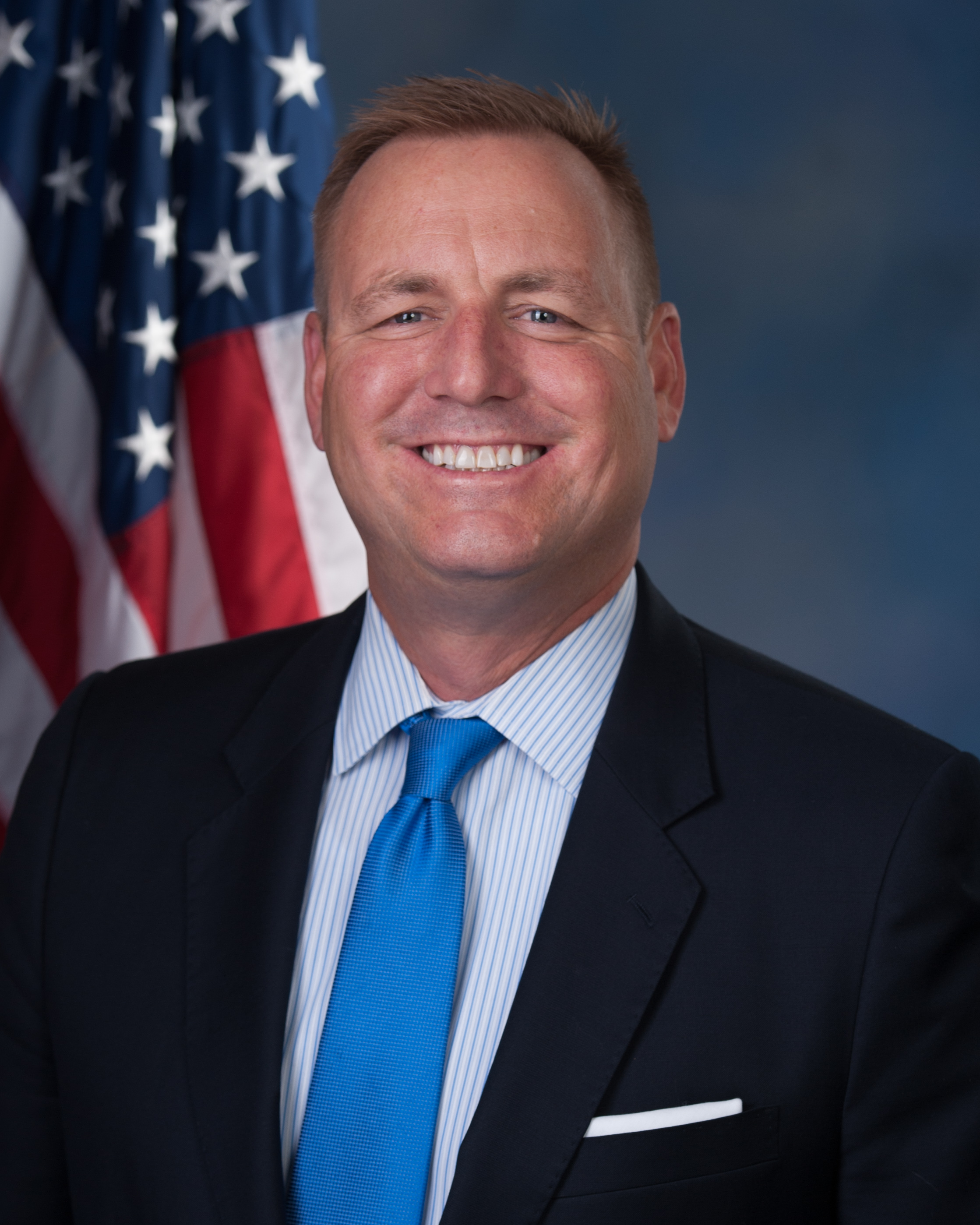
- Official portrait, 2017

Member of the U.S. House of Representatives from California
- In office January 3, 2011 – January 3, 2019
- Preceded by: George Radanovich
- Succeeded by: Josh Harder
- Constituency: 19th district (2011–2013); 10th district (2013–2019)

Member of the California Senate from the 12th district
- In office December 2, 2002 – November 30, 2010
- Preceded by: Dick Monteith
- Succeeded by: Anthony Cannella

Personal details
- Born: Jeffrey John Denham; July 29, 1967 (age 58) Hawthorne, California, U.S.
- Party: Republican
- Spouse: Sonia Denham (m. 1993)
- Children: 2
- Education: Victor Valley College; California Polytechnic State University, San Luis Obispo (BA)

Military service
- Branch/service: United States Air Force; U.S. Air Force Reserve
- Years of service: 1984–1988 (active); 1988–2000 (reserve)
- Rank: Staff Sergeant
- Battles/wars: Operation Desert Storm; Operation Restore Hope
- Awards: Meritorious Service Medal
- Denham's voice Denham supporting the 21st Century AIRR Act. Recorded October 25, 2017

Jeffrey John Denham (born July 29, 1967) is an American politician, United States Air Force veteran, and businessman. A member of the Republican Party, he served as the U.S. representative for California's 10th congressional district from 2013 to 2019. Denham first won election to the U.S. House in 2010, representing California's 19th congressional district for one term before redistricting led him to run in the 10th district in 2012.

From 2002 to 2010, Denham served in the California State Senate, representing the 12th District, which includes Madera, Merced, Monterey, San Benito, and Stanislaus counties. Prior to seeking political office, Denham served on active and reserve status in the United States Air Force for 16 years, and served in both Operation Desert Storm in Iraq and Operation Restore Hope in Somalia.

During his congressional tenure, Denham was active in immigration issues, notably in the effort to draft and pass legislation that would successfully resolve the status of Dreamers.

Denham was narrowly defeated in his 2018 bid for re-election by Democrat Josh Harder and became a lobbyist for K&L Gates.

== Early life, education, and military service ==
In 1984, at age 17, Denham enlisted in the United States Air Force. He served on active and reserve status for 16 years as a tactical aircraft maintenance specialist, during which he received the Meritorious Service Medal for his service during Operation Desert Storm (Iraq) and Operation Restore Hope (Somalia). Denham received an associate degree from Victor Valley College in 1989 and a B.A. in political science from California Polytechnic State University, San Luis Obispo, in 1992. He has worked as a farmer and started a plastics container company to ship produce.

== 2000 State Assembly campaign ==
In 2000, Denham ran for the California State Assembly against City Councilman Simon Salinas, a Democrat. A total of $2.5 million was spent in the race. Salinas defeated Denham with 52% of the vote.

== California State Senate ==
=== Elections ===
2002

Denham ran for the State Senate in 2002 against former Democratic State Assemblyman Rusty Areias. The race featured a number of negative political advertisements and was one of the most expensive legislative races in state history, with over $6.3 million spent. Denham's campaign highlighted Areias's financial difficulties, including unpaid taxes and did not focus on Areias's state policy positions. Denham's negative campaign tactics drew widespread criticism, including from fellow Republicans.

The election was on November 5, 2002, but the vote count was close; the lead in the race went back and forth for several days. Denham won by 1,843 votes, 48% to 47%.

2006

In November 2006, Denham won re-election to a second term with 58% of the vote. Denham's opponent, Wiley Nickel, was later elected to Congress from North Carolina in 2022.

2008 recall attempt

In 2008, a recall effort was instigated against Denham by Democrat Don Perata after Denham declined to cast a deadlock-breaking vote on the state budget. Supporters of the recall turned in more than 60,000 signatures with the recall scheduled to appear on the ballot on June 3, 2008. In early May, Perata called off the efforts to recall Denham after it showed signs of backfiring, but the election was already on the ballot. Denham easily survived the recall by a 75.4% to 24.6% margin. Denham himself speculated that the recall effort actually helped, rather than hurt, his political career by raising his profile.

2009 Lieutenant Governor and State Assembly campaigns

Denham announced in December 2008 that he would be a candidate for Lieutenant Governor of California in the 2010 election. He ended his campaign soon after Governor Arnold Schwarzenegger, in November 2009, appointed Republican State Senator Abel Maldonado to fill the vacancy left by the resignation of Lieutenant Governor John Garamendi, a Democrat, who was elected to Congress.

Denham then campaigned briefly for the State Assembly seat being vacated by Tom Berryhill of Modesto but in late December 2009 he dropped out of that race to run for Congress.

=== Tenure ===
During his time in the state legislature, Denham focused his efforts on education, agriculture and job creation. He called for a reduction in government waste in Sacramento, better use of state surplus assets, and a crackdown on sexual predators.

Denham's awards include Legislator of the Year by the California State Sheriffs' Association (2004), Outstanding Legislator by the California State Sheriff's Association (2005), Legislator of the Year by the California Small Business Association (2005), Most Progressive Law Enforcement Leader of the Year by A Woman's Place of Merced (2005), and California Teachers Association Gold Award (2005).

=== Committee assignments ===
Denham's committee assignments in the California State Senate included:

- Business, Professions and Economic Development
- Education
- Agriculture
- Veterans Affairs
- Governmental Organization

== U.S. House of Representatives ==
=== Elections ===
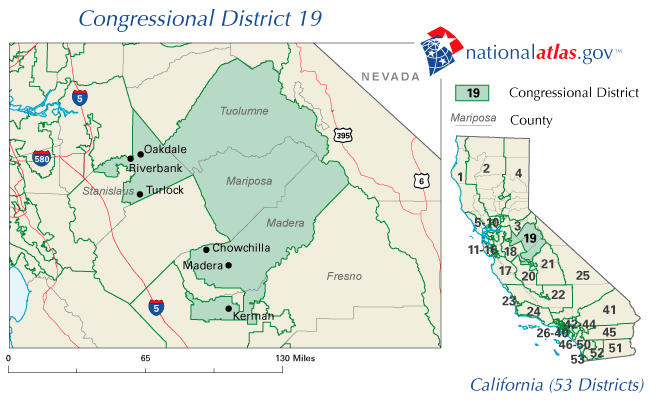
From 2003 to 2013, California's 19th congressional district covered parts of Fresno, Madera, Mariposa, Tuolumne, and Stanislaus counties.

==== 2010 ====
In December 2009, seven-term U.S. Congressman George Radanovich announced he would retire for health reasons. He endorsed Denham as his successor in California's 19th congressional district. In the Republican primary, Denham defeated Fresno mayor Jim Patterson, former U.S. Congressman Richard Pombo, and Fresno City Councilman Larry Westerlund 36%–31%–21%–12%. In the 2010 general election, Denham defeated Democrat Loraine Goodwin with 65% of the vote.

==== 2012 ====
After redistricting, much of the old 19th became the 16th District, which was significantly more Democratic than its successor. Meanwhile, much of the northwestern portion of the old 19th (e.g. Turlock, Riverbank, Oakdale, and the rest of northeastern Stanislaus county) was transferred to the 10th District. That district had previously been the 18th District, represented by retiring five-term Democrat Dennis Cardoza. The new 10th included all of Stanislaus County and the southern portion of San Joaquin County (including Tracy and Manteca). It also included Denham's home in Atwater, which had been just outside the old 19th's boundaries. Members of the House are only required to live in the state they wish to represent.

Former NASA astronaut José M. Hernández ran against him as the Democratic candidate. The 10th was considered a swing district in the 2012 election. Denham won with 53% of the vote to Hernández's 47%.

==== 2014 ====
In 2014, Denham ran unopposed in the Republican primary. His Democratic opponent was Michael Eggman. Although the seat was regarded by some as "vulnerable" earlier in the year, the Rothenberg Political Report ultimately listed the race as "Republican Favored" and Denham defeated Eggman with 56% of the vote.

==== 2016 ====
Denham ran for re-election in 2016. He finished first in the top-two primary on June 7, 2016, and again faced Eggman in the general election on November 8, 2016. Denham won re-election with 52.4% of the vote to Eggman's 47.6%. More than $11 million was spent on the race, mostly from outside groups.

==== 2018 ====
In May 2017, investor Josh Harder became the third Democrat to announce that he would challenge Denham in 2018. He said he would focus on job creation and economic opportunity. "There's just not a lot of opportunities for entry-level positions," Harder said. "What we need [is] a better, positive vision for what the economic development of the valley can bring."

Challenging Denham for the Republican nomination was veterinarian Ted Howze, who criticized Denham's support for what critics characterized as "amnesty" for illegal immigrants. Denham came in first in the top-two primary, with 37.8% of the vote. Denham was one of ten military veterans to whose campaigns Ambassador John Bolton's PAC gave $10,000 apiece during the 2018 race.

The Modesto Bee wrote on May 12, 2018, that "Jeff Denham is going to be hard to beat." By this point, the original field of Democratic candidates had been cut in half from ten. In addition to Harder, they included Sue Zwahlen, a former emergency room nurse and school board member; Michael Eggman, a former farmer who had challenged Denham in 2014 and 2016; Virginia Madueño, the former mayor of Riverbank, California; and Michael Barkley. Harder was endorsed by former President Barack Obama. Harder won the Democratic nomination with 16.7% of the primary vote and faced Denham in the general election. Harder defeated Denham in a closely contested race, receiving 51.3% of the vote to Denham's 48.7% in a race that was not called until a week after election day.

=== Tenure ===
In April 2017, Denham hosted a town hall meeting in Turlock, which approximately 1,000 constituents attended. When a constituent asked for him to support the release of Donald Trump's tax returns, Denham said "I'm not going to ask the previous president that I served under to show his birth certificate any more than I am going to ask this president to show his taxes."

Denham voted in favor of the Tax Cuts and Jobs Act of 2017. Regarding his vote, Denham described the bill as a "win for the Valley" he represents and he said "everyone will see an increase in their paychecks in 2018." Denham said he believed the bill would grow local agricultural business.

In 2018, Denham made a bid to lead the United States House Committee on Transportation and Infrastructure.

=== Committee assignments ===
- Committee on Transportation and Infrastructure
  - Subcommittee on Economic Development, Public Buildings and Emergency Management
  - Subcommittee on Railroads, Pipelines, and Hazardous Materials, Chairman
  - Subcommittee on Water Resources and Environment
- Committee on Veterans' Affairs
  - Subcommittee on Economic Opportunity
  - Subcommittee on Health
- Committee on Agriculture
  - Subcommittee on Horticulture, Research, Biotechnology, and Foreign Agriculture
  - Subcommittee on Livestock, Rural Development, and Credit

Denham was a member of the Republican Main Street Partnership and the U.S.-Japan Caucus.

== Political positions ==
As of January 2018, Denham had voted with his party in 90.5% of votes in the 115th United States Congress and voted in line with President Trump's position in 98.3% of votes. He ranked #43 out of 433 members of Congress in the number of times he had voted against his party's position. In the 114th United States Congress, Denham was ranked as the 41st most bipartisan member of the U.S. House of Representatives (and the second most bipartisan member of the U.S. House of Representatives from California) in the Bipartisan Index created by The Lugar Center and the McCourt School of Public Policy that ranks members of the United States Congress by their degree of bipartisanship (by measuring the frequency each member's bills attract co-sponsors from the opposite party and each member's co-sponsorship of bills by members of the opposite party).

Denham was a close ally of then-House Majority Leader Kevin McCarthy.

=== Vote Smart Political Courage Test ===
Vote Smart, a non-profit, non-partisan research organization that collects and distributes information on candidates for public office in the United States, "researched presidential and congressional candidates' public records to determine candidates' likely responses on certain key issues." According to Vote Smart's 2016 analysis, Denham generally supported pro-life legislation, opposed an income tax increase, supported mandatory minimum sentences for non-violent drug offenders, supported lowering taxes as a means of promoting economic growth, opposed requiring states to adopt federal education standards, supports building the Keystone Pipeline, supported government funding for the development of renewable energy, opposed the federal regulation of greenhouse gas emissions, opposed gun-control legislation, supported repealing the Affordable Care Act, opposed same-sex marriage, and supported increased American intervention in Iraq and Syria beyond air support.

=== Tax reform ===
In December 2017, Denham helped the Republican Party pass the Trump tax bill, which he called “a historic milestone” that would simplify the tax code, improve the economy, and reduce families' tax burdens. “Congress has delivered on our promise to lower taxes for the middle class,” he said, calling the bill “a win for the valley and for everyone who will see an increase in their paychecks in 2018.” He celebrated the doubled child tax credit and said the law would make local growers “more globally competitive.”

=== Employment ===
Appearing on NPR in May 2018, he spoke up for the stricter requirements for food stamps in the new farm bill, which he said would encourage able-bodied people without children to take care of at home to find work.

=== Animal rights ===
In September 2014, the Humane Society Legislative Fund endorsed Denham. The HSLF's Wayne Pacelle said Denham was “leading the charge on some of the most important animal protection issues in Washington.” In the 113th Congress, Denham was the lead sponsor of the Pets on Trains Act (H.R. 2066), which required Amtrak to allow companion animals on some passenger trains. He led the effort in the House Agriculture Committee to defeat the “King amendment,” which would nullify hundreds of state and local laws on food safety, animal welfare, and agriculture. He was a lead sponsor of the Egg Products Inspection Act Amendments (H.R. 1731), which would improve the treatment of hundreds of millions of laying hens. He co-sponsored the Prevent All Soring Tactics (PAST) Act (H.R. 1518) to strengthen the federal law against the use of caustic chemicals to on the hooves and legs of show horses to induce a high-stepping gait. He also co-sponsored the Animal Fighting Spectator Prohibition Act (H.R. 366), which made it a federal crime to attend or bring a child to a dogfight or cockfight.

In April 2018, Denham introduced a law that would forbid the consumption of dog or cat meat. “If passed,” reported the Washington Post, “the ban would send a clear signal that the United States condemns the dog and cat meat trades in East Asia.” Denham said that the law would signal “that the U.S. will not tolerate this disturbing practice in our country” and would demonstrate “our unity with other nations that have banned dog and cat meat, and it bolsters existing international efforts to crack down on the practice worldwide.”

=== Drug policy ===
Denham had a "D" rating from marijuana legalization group National Organization for the Reform of Marijuana Laws (NORML) regarding his voting record on cannabis-related matters. He was active in working with law enforcement to halt illegal growing of cannabis. Denham opposed the legalization of recreational marijuana, saying that "legalizing drugs, including marijuana, is a detriment to society and will endanger future generations." He voted for allowing veterans access to medical marijuana, if legal in their state, per their Veterans Health Administration doctor's recommendation, the second time the Veterans Equal Access Amendment was introduced in 2016.

=== Environment ===
As of January 2018, he had a 6% lifetime score from the environmental advocacy group the League of Conservation Voters.

=== Economic issues ===
Denham had argued that the national deficit is the biggest issue for the United States, and called it a threat to the nation's freedom.

In July 2012, he criticized an event put on by the General Services Administration, which cost $268,732. He said that he believed that the controversy went even further than the GSA.

Denham voted against raising the debt ceiling in 2013, which led to the United States federal government shutdown of 2013. He also voted against the bill that reopened the government and avoided a default.

Denham voted for the Tax Cuts and Jobs Act of 2017, which he praised as "a historic milestone". Denham's vote was criticized by Democratic opponent TJ Cox, who claimed the bill would "cost $1.43 trillion over the next decade".

=== Healthcare ===
On April 26, 2017, Denham told The Hill that he was not in favor of the American Health Care Act (AHCA). Denham said that he could only support a repeal-bill that kept significant parts of Obamacare intact, such as coverage for pre-existing conditions and expanded Medicaid coverage. However, on May 4, 2017, Denham voted to repeal the Patient Protection and Affordable Care Act (Obamacare) and pass AHCA. Denham said that he voted for the revised version of AHCA, which allows states to seek a waiver to allow insurers to charge individuals with preexisting conditions higher premiums, because the bill would provide $8 billion over five years to help those with pre-existing conditions. He voted for this version of the bill before the nonpartisan Congressional Budget Office had estimated its impact; the CBO had estimated that 24 million Americans would lose insurance under the previous version of the bill.

During his re-election campaign, Denham falsely claimed that The Washington Post fact-checker had found his opponent's claims about the impact of Obamacare's repeal on preexisting conditions to be false. The Washington Post fact-checker responded, saying that Denham was "twisting an unrelated fact check and [was] misleading voters."

=== High-speed rail ===
Denham, who served as chairman of the House Subcommittee on Railroads, had opposed plans for a high-speed train between San Francisco and Los Angeles. On March 6, 2017, the New York Times quoted him as saying that “no more federal dollars will go to California high-speed rail.” He charged that $600 million of state funds allocated by Proposition 1A in 2008 for Caltrain's electrification was being diverted. “'They are stealing Prop 1A money and using it for something else,” Denham said.

=== Immigration ===
In October 2013, Denham co-sponsored the comprehensive immigration reform bill introduced by House Democrats. In announcing his support for the bill, he said: "We can't afford any more delays. I support an earned path to citizenship to allow those who want to become citizens to demonstrate a commitment to our country, learn English, pay fines and back taxes and pass background checks."

In August 2014, Denham broke ranks with the Republican Party and voted against a bill that would have dismantled the Deferred Action for Childhood Arrivals.

In the autumn of 2017, Denham unsuccessfully "pleaded with Trump...not to end the Deferred Action for Childhood Arrivals program, which provided temporary deportation relief and work permits for hundreds of thousands of people brought to the country illegally as children."

In May 2018, Denham was one of a dozen House Republicans who, defying Speaker Paul Ryan, forced a vote on immigration in an effort to help the so-called Dreamers. In a May 16 interview with Tucker Carlson, Denham said that "the only way we're going to get the border secured is actually working together to pass something off the floor." In order to gain support for the Mexican border wall, he said, Republicans must support action to help Dreamers. "The only way you're going to get the 60 members on a bipartisan border security bill is with this solution that is equally as important that the president of the United States is asking for."

Denham said in June 2018 that he had forged an agreement with more conservative House members that would provide temporary residency visas for young immigrants and that would also fund Donald Trump's border wall with Mexico.

In a June 7, 2018, interview on MSNBC, Denham said, "I want to see a fixed to our broken immigration system" and that "You shouldn't be tearing families apart." He described the Trump Administration's "zero tolerance policy" as "a bad idea."

=== Water supply ===
In June 2018, Denham joined three other local members of Congress in introducing legislation “to cut through red tape to raise the spillway gates at New Exchequer Dam and improve water supply reliability for Merced County.” The measure “would provide an additional 57,000 acre-feet for irrigation, groundwater replenishment and environmental benefits.”

=== Social issues ===
In May 2016, Denham initially voted against an amendment to a defense appropriations bills by Democratic Representative Sean Patrick Maloney which would prohibit government contracts with companies that don't comply with President Obama's executive order banning federal contractors from discriminating against LGBT workers. The following week, Denham reversed course and voted for Maloney's amendment to uphold President Obama's executive order banning federal contractors from discriminating based on sexual orientation or gender identity.

=== 2016 presidential race ===
Denham did not make an endorsement in the 2016 presidential race. He said that he planned to support the Republican nominee but did not specifically endorse Donald Trump, and that "Like many Americans from both parties, my first choice for president is not on the ballot in November."

=== FEMA reforms ===
On November 21, 2017, Denham introduced the Supporting Mitigation Activities and Resiliency Targets for Rebuilding Act, also known as the SMART Rebuilding Act. The SMART Rebuilding Act, which proposed cost-saving Federal Emergency Management Agency (FEMA) reforms, was included in the U.S. House's subsequent Disaster Recovery Reform Act and supplemental appropriations bill. The disaster aid package, which included $81 billion in additional disaster relief funding in addition to Denham's FEMA reforms, was passed by the House in December 2017 in a bipartisan vote.

== Personal life ==
Denham and his wife Sonia have two children. She is Hispanic, and Denham has said that he learned Spanish to communicate with her family, including to help his Mexican father-in-law through the process of gaining U.S. citizenship. Denham owns and operates Denham Plastics, a supplier of reusable containers in the agriculture industry. He and his family also farm almonds at their ranch in Merced County.

== Electoral history ==
California Assembly District 28
Year	Republican	Votes	Pct	Democratic	Votes	Pct	Third party	Party	Votes	Pct	Third party	Party	Votes	Pct
2000	Jeff Denham	54,729	44%	Simon Salinas	66,011	53%	J. J. Vogel	Reform	2,891	2%	Roger Ver	Libertarian	2,134	2%

California Senate District 12
Year	Republican	Votes	Pct	Democratic	Votes	Pct	Third party	Party	Votes	Pct
2002	Jeff Denham	73,877	48%	Rusty Areias	72,034	47%	David Eaton	Libertarian	6,950	5%
2006	Jeff Denham	90,288	58%	Wiley Nickel	65,130	42%				

California Congressional District 19 (2010) and 10 (from 2012)
Year	Republican	Votes	Pct	Democratic	Votes	Pct	Third party	Party	Votes	Pct
2010	Jeff Denham	128,394	65%	Loraine Goodwin	69,912	35%	Les Marsden	Independent	596	0%
2012	Jeff Denham	110,265	53%	José M. Hernández	98,934	47%				
2014	Jeff Denham	70,582	56%	Michael Eggman	55,123	44%				
2016	Jeff Denham	110,659	52%	Michael Eggman	100,646	48%				
2018	Jeff Denham	91,401	48.7%	Josh Harder	96,320	51.3%				

U.S. House of Representatives
Preceded by George Radanovich	Member of the U.S. House of Representatives from California's 19th congressional district 2011–2013	Succeeded by Zoe Lofgren
Preceded by John Garamendi	Member of the U.S. House of Representatives from California's 10th congressional district 2013–2019	Succeeded by Josh Harder
U.S. order of precedence (ceremonial)
Preceded by Dennis Cardoza as Former U.S. Representative	Order of precedence of the United States as Former U.S. Representative	Succeeded by Tom Hagedorn as Former U.S. Representative
