= Rusty Areias =

American politician

Member of the California State Assembly from the 28th district
- In office December 7, 1992 - November 30, 1994
- Preceded by: Sam Farr
- Succeeded by: Peter Frusetta

Member of the California State Assembly from the 25th district
- In office December 6, 1982 - November 30, 1992
- Preceded by: Alister McAlister
- Succeeded by: Margaret Snyder

Personal details
- Born: September 12, 1949 (age 76) Los Banos, California
- Party: Democratic
- Spouse: Julie Sandino
- Children: 1
- Education: California State University, Chico
- Occupation: Rancher, lobbyist
- Known for: Former member of California State Assembly

Rusty Areias (born September 12, 1949) is a former Democratic member of the California State Assembly for the 25th and 28th district. Areias served in the California State Assembly from 1982 to 1994. He lost bids for the California State Senate in 1996 and 2002.

From 1998 to 2001, he was the Director of the California Department of Parks and Recreation. He is a principal at California Strategies, a public affairs and lobbying firm. Areias and two other employees of California Strategies were fined in 2013 for seeking to influence state government decisions without registering as lobbyists. In May 2020 Areias was honored to attend the dedication of the Rusty Areias Community Garden at Martial Cottle Park located in San Jose, California. Areias was involved in the creation of the park while serving as Director of the California Department of Parks and Recreation.
