= Electoral history of Anna Eshoo =

Elections featuring American politician

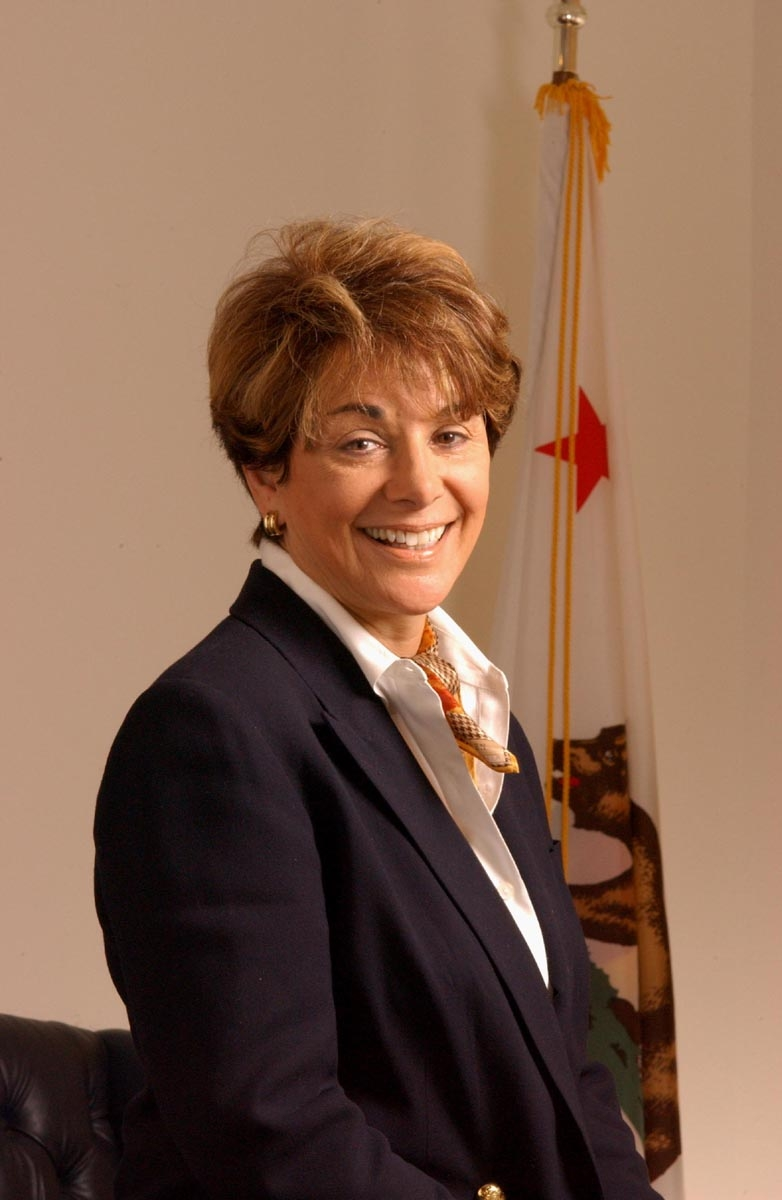
Eshoo's congressional portrait

Anna Eshoo is an American politician who represented California in the U.S. House of Representatives from 1993 to 2025. Before her tenure in Congress, Eshoo served as a member of the Democratic National Committee from 1980 to 1992. She was also elected to the San Mateo County Board of Supervisors from 1983 to 1992. Eshoo initially unsuccessfully ran for the U.S. House in 1988, later being elected in 1992. In 2023, Eshoo announced she would not seek reelection in 2024, leading to the contentious 2024 election to fill her seat.

== U.S. House of Representatives ==
=== 1988 ===
1988 California's 12th congressional district election
Primary election
Party	Candidate	Votes	%
Democratic	Anna Eshoo	30,963	43.1
Democratic	Jim Garrison	26,609	37.1
Democratic	Sylvia Simmons	6,354	8.8
Democratic	Gary Bond	3,970	5.5
Democratic	Ernest R. Macias	3,901	5.4
Total votes		71,797	100.0
General election
Republican	Tom Campbell	136,384	51.7
Democratic	Anna Eshoo	121,523	46.0
Libertarian	Tom Grey	6,023	2.3
Total votes		263,930	100.0
Republican hold			

=== 1992 ===
1992 California's 14th congressional district election
Primary election
Party	Candidate	Votes	%
Democratic	Anna Eshoo	32,001	40.5
Democratic	Ted Lempert	28,858	36.5
Democratic	Tom Nolan	11,574	14.6
Democratic	Thomas Roy Harney	1,800	2.3
Democratic	Gerry B. Andeen	1,655	2.1
Democratic	Robert Palmer	1,445	1.8
Democratic	Gary Bond	1,242	1.6
Democratic	John Yusken	530	0.7
Total votes		79,105	100.0
General election
Democratic	Anna Eshoo	146,873	56.7
Republican	Tom Huening	101,202	39.0
Libertarian	Chuck Olson	7,220	2.8
Peace and Freedom	David Wald	3,912	1.5
No party	Sims (write-in)	12	0.01
No party	Maginnis (write-in)	3	0.003
Total votes		259,232	100.0
Democratic gain from Republican			

=== 1994 ===
1994 California's 14th congressional district election
Primary election
Party	Candidate	Votes	%
Democratic	Anna Eshoo (incumbent)	47,373	86.6
Democratic	Donald Tirey	7,338	13.4
Total votes		54,711	100.0
General election
Democratic	Anna Eshoo (incumbent)	130,713	60.60
Republican	Ben Brink	78,475	39.40
Total votes		199,188	100.0
Democratic hold			

=== 1996 ===
1996 California's 14th congressional district election
Primary election
Party	Candidate	Votes	%
Democratic	Anna Eshoo (incumbent)	63,510	100.0
Total votes		63,510	100.0
General election
Democratic	Anna Eshoo (incumbent)	149,313	64.9
Republican	Ben Brink	71,573	31.1
Peace and Freedom	Timothy Thompson	3,653	1.6
Libertarian	Joseph Dehn	3,492	1.5
Natural Law	Robert Wells	2,144	0.9
Total votes		230,175	100.0
Democratic hold			

=== 1998 ===
1998 California's 14th congressional district election
Primary election
Party	Candidate	Votes	%
Democratic	Anna Eshoo (incumbent)	85,511	93.9
Democratic	George Kiehle	5,512	6.1
Total votes		91,023	100.0
General election
Democratic	Anna Eshoo (incumbent)	129,663	68.64
Republican	Chris Haugen	53,719	28.44
Libertarian	Joseph W. Dehn III	3,166	1.68
Natural Law	Anna Currivan	2,362	1.25
Total votes		188,910	100.0
Democratic hold			

=== 2000 ===
2000 California's 14th congressional district election
Primary election
Party	Candidate	Votes	%
Democratic	Anna Eshoo (incumbent)	111,136	100.0
Total votes		111,136	100.0
General election
Democratic	Anna Eshoo (incumbent)	161,720	70.3
Republican	Bill Quraishi	59,338	25.8
Libertarian	Joseph W. Dehn III	4,715	2.0
Natural Law	John Black	4,489	1.9
Total votes		230,262	100.0
Democratic hold			

=== 2002 ===
2002 California's 14th congressional district election
Primary election
Party	Candidate	Votes	%
Democratic	Anna Eshoo (incumbent)	53,132	100.0
Total votes		53,132	100.0
General election
Democratic	Anna Eshoo (incumbent)	117,055	68.2
Republican	Joe Nixon	48,346	28.2
Libertarian	Andrew B. Carver	6,277	3.6
Total votes		171,678	100.0
Democratic hold			

=== 2004 ===
2004 California's 14th congressional district election
Primary election
Party	Candidate	Votes	%
Democratic	Anna Eshoo (incumbent)	81,911	100.0
Total votes		81,911	100.0
General election
Democratic	Anna Eshoo (incumbent)	182,712	69.8
Republican	Chris Haugen	69,564	26.6
Libertarian	Brian Holtz	9,588	3.6
No party	Dennis Mitrzyk (write-in)	24	0.0
Total votes		262,088	100.0
Democratic hold			

=== 2006 ===
2006 California's 14th congressional district election
Primary election
Party	Candidate	Votes	%
Democratic	Anna Eshoo (incumbent)	65,255	100.0
Total votes		65,255	100.0
General election
Democratic	Anna Eshoo (incumbent)	141,153	71.1
Republican	Rob Smith	48,097	24.3
Libertarian	Brian Holtz	4,692	2.3
Green	Carol Brouillet	4,633	2.3
Total votes		198,575	100.0
Democratic hold			

=== 2008 ===
2008 California's 14th congressional district election
Primary election
Party	Candidate	Votes	%
Democratic	Anna Eshoo (incumbent)	60,856	100.0
Total votes		60,856	100.0
General election
Democratic	Anna Eshoo (incumbent)	190,301	69.8
Republican	Ronny Santana	60,610	22.3
Libertarian	Brian Holtz	11,929	4.3
Green	Carol Brouillet	9,926	3.6
Total votes		272,766	100.0
Democratic hold			

=== 2010 ===
2010 California's 14th congressional district election
Primary election
Party	Candidate	Votes	%
Democratic	Anna Eshoo (incumbent)	66,978	100.0
Total votes		66,978	100.0
General election
Democratic	Anna Eshoo (incumbent)	150,542	69.1
Republican	Dave Chapman	60,668	27.9
Libertarian	Paul Lazaga	6,685	3.0
Total votes		217,895	100.0
Democratic hold			

=== 2012 ===
2012 California's 18th congressional district election
Primary election
Party	Candidate	Votes	%
Democratic	Anna Eshoo (incumbent)	86,851	61.5
Republican	Dave Chapman	42,174	29.8
Democratic	William Parks	6,504	4.6
Green	Carol Brouillet	5,777	4.1
Total votes		141,306	100.0
General election
Democratic	Anna Eshoo (incumbent)	212,831	70.5
Republican	Dave Chapman	89,103	29.5
Total votes		301,934	100.0
Democratic hold			

=== 2014 ===
2014 California's 18th congressional district election
Primary election
Party	Candidate	Votes	%
Democratic	Anna Eshoo (incumbent)	81,295	67.6
Republican	Richard B. Fox	27,111	22.5
Republican	Bruce Anderson	9,644	8.0
Republican	Oscar Alejandro Braun	2,190	1.8
Total votes		120,240	100.0
General election
Democratic	Anna Eshoo (incumbent)	133,060	67.8
Republican	Richard B. Fox	63,326	32.2
Total votes		196,386	100.0
Democratic hold			

=== 2016 ===
2016 California's 18th congressional district election
Primary election
Party	Candidate	Votes	%
Democratic	Anna Eshoo (incumbent)	132,726	68.2
Republican	Richard Fox	47,484	24.4
Democratic	Bob Harlow	14,411	7.4
Total votes		194,621	100.0
General election
Democratic	Anna Eshoo (incumbent)	230,460	71.1
Republican	Richard Fox	93,470	28.9
Total votes		323,930	100.0
Democratic hold			

=== 2018 ===
2018 California's 18th congressional district election
Primary election
Party	Candidate	Votes	%
Democratic	Anna Eshoo (incumbent)	133,993	73.4
Republican	Christine Russell	42,692	23.4
No party preference	John Karl Fredrich	5,803	3.2
Total votes		182,488	100.0
General election
Democratic	Anna Eshoo (incumbent)	225,142	74.5
Republican	Christine Russell	77,096	25.5
Total votes		302,238	100.0
Democratic hold			

=== 2020 ===
2020 California's 18th congressional district election
Primary election
Party	Candidate	Votes	%
Democratic	Anna Eshoo (incumbent)	146,225	61.7
Democratic	Rishi Kumar	38,826	16.4
Republican	Richard B. Fox	28,863	12.2
Republican	Phil Reynolds	18,600	7.8
Libertarian	Bob Goodwyn	4,462	1.9
Total votes		236,976	100.0
General election
Democratic	Anna Eshoo (incumbent)	217,388	63.2
Democratic	Rishi Kumar	126,751	36.8
Total votes		344,139	100.0
Democratic hold			

=== 2022 ===
2022 California's 16th congressional district election
Primary election
Party	Candidate	Votes	%
Democratic	Anna Eshoo (incumbent)	81,100	47.9
Democratic	Rishi Kumar	26,438	15.6
Republican	Peter Ohtaki	21,354	12.6
Republican	Richard Fox	13,187	7.8
Democratic	Ajwang Rading	11,418	6.7
Democratic	Greg Tanaka	11,107	6.6
Republican	Benjamin Solomon	2,659	1.6
No party preference	John Fredrich	2,120	1.3
Democratic	Travis Odekirk (write-in)	2	0.0
Total votes		169,385	100.0
General election
Democratic	Anna Eshoo (incumbent)	139,235	57.8
Democratic	Rishi Kumar	101,772	42.2
Total votes		241,007	100.0
Democratic hold			
