= Evan Low =

American politician (born 1983)

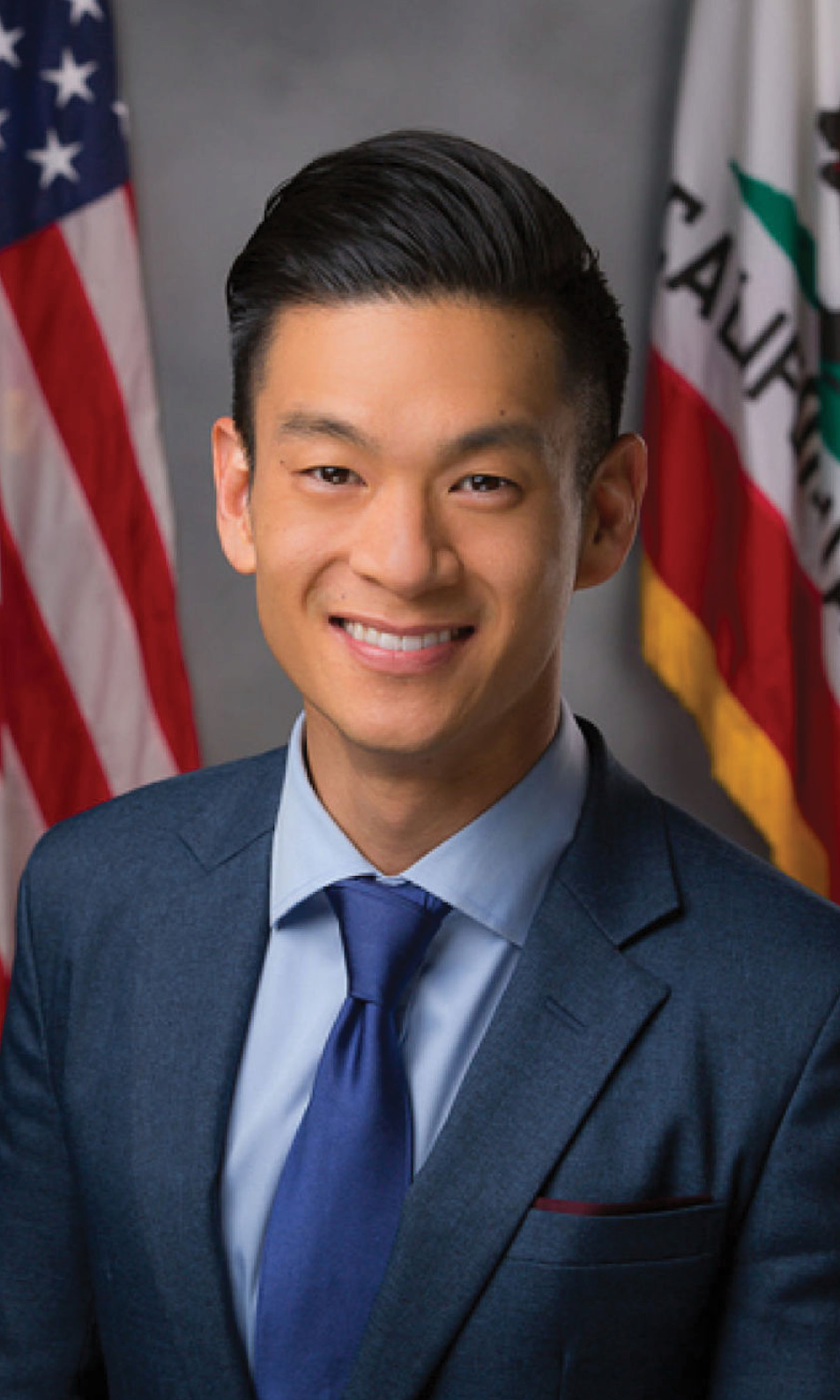
- Official portrait, 2016

Member of the California State Assembly
- In office December 1, 2014 – December 2, 2024
- Preceded by: Paul Fong
- Succeeded by: Patrick Ahrens
- Constituency: 28th district (2014–2022); 26th district (2022–2024)

Mayor of Campbell
- In office December 1, 2009 – December 1, 2014
- Preceded by: Michael Kotowski
- Succeeded by: Jeff Cristina

Personal details
- Born: June 5, 1983 (age 43) San Jose, California, U.S.
- Party: Democratic
- Education: De Anza College (AA); San Jose State University (BA)

Evan Low (born June 5, 1983) is an American politician who served in the California State Assembly from 2014 to 2024. A member of the Democratic Party, he represented the 26th Assembly district, which encompasses parts of Silicon Valley, including Cupertino, Sunnyvale, Santa Clara and portions of northern and western San Jose. He was a member of the California Legislative LGBT Caucus (and served as chair from 2017 to 2018 and 2021 to 2022), and served as Chair of the California Asian American & Pacific Islander Legislative Caucus.

Prior to his election in the Assembly in 2014, Low served as Mayor and City Councilmember in Campbell, California. On January 15, 2020, Low was named national co-chair of Andrew Yang's presidential campaign. He was a candidate in the 2024 election to succeed Anna Eshoo as the U.S. representative from California's 16th congressional district, losing to Sam Liccardo in the general election.

== Early life ==
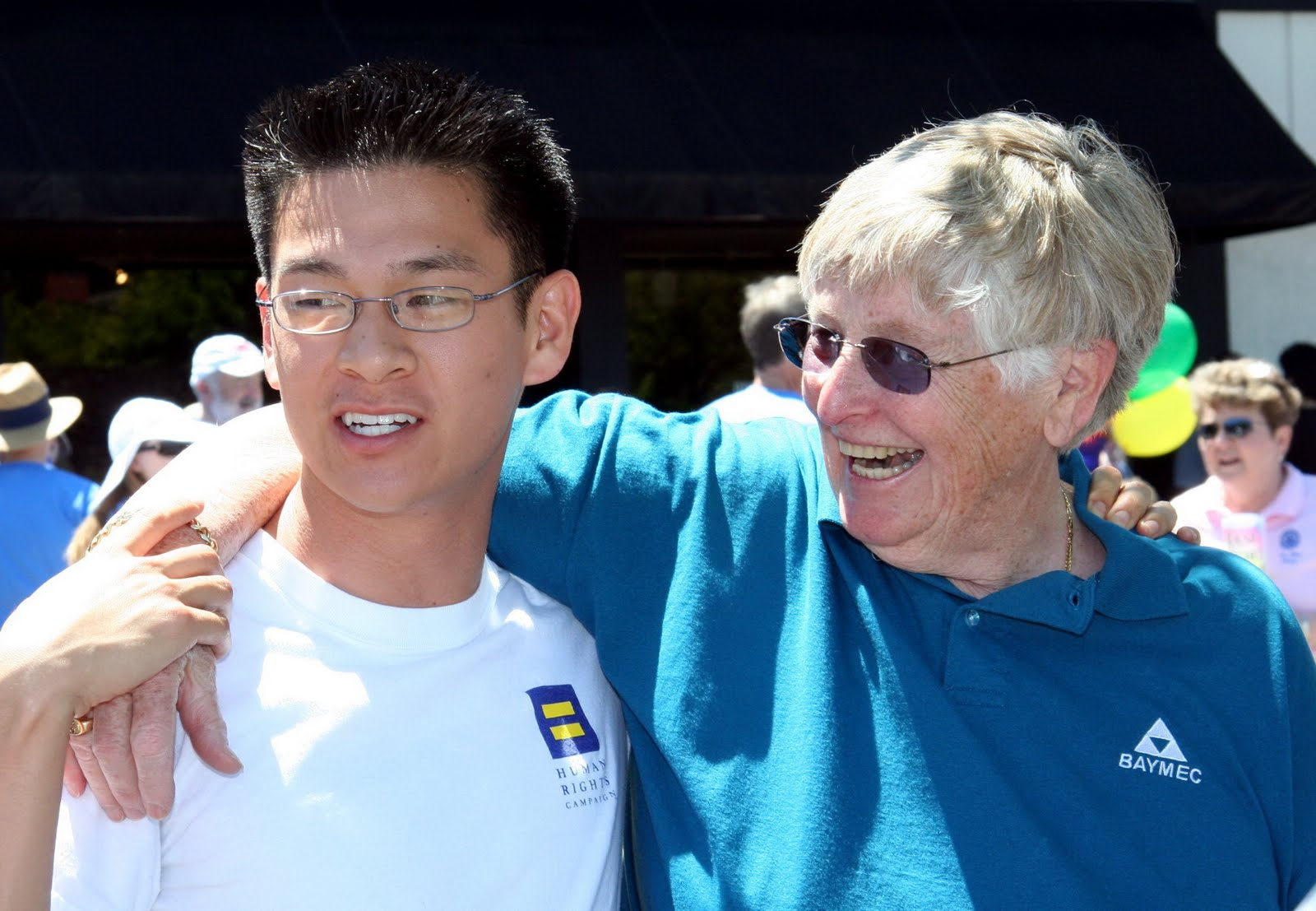
Low (left) attends a pride parade in 2006.

Low was born in San Jose, California, on June 5, 1983, to Chinese American optometrist Arthur Low. Low grew up in San Jose and attended Leland High School. In 2003, Low moved to neighboring Campbell.

Low earned an associate's degree from De Anza College in Cupertino, and a bachelor's degree in political science from San Jose State University.

== Campbell City Council ==
In 2004, Low unsuccessfully ran for a seat on the City Council, but he ran again in 2006 and won in his second attempt. Low worked as a senior district representative for California's former 28th State Assembly district Assemblymember Paul Fong.

When his colleagues selected him to become Campbell mayor in 2009, Low became the youngest openly gay, Asian American mayor in the nation.

In 2013, his colleagues on the Campbell City Council selected him to serve as mayor for a second time. His term on the council expired in 2014.

== California Assembly ==
In 2014, Assembly Speaker Toni Atkins appointed Low as Assistant Majority Whip. Low was kept in the same leadership role by Atkins's successor, Speaker Anthony Rendon, in 2016.

Low chaired the California Assembly Business and Professions Committee from March 2016 until November 2021, when he was removed without explanation by Speaker Anthony Rendon. Low was replaced by Marc Berman.

Low is a co-founder and co-chair of the California Legislative Tech Caucus. There are 24 members of the Tech Caucus.

In 2014, Low supported SCA 5, an initiative that would have asked voters to consider eliminating California Proposition 209's ban on the use of race, sex, color, ethnicity, or national origin in recruitment, admissions, and retention programs at California's public universities and colleges. Proposition 209 also effectively banned affirmative action in the public contracting and employment. Low supported a similar effort to repeal Prop 209 in its entirety with ACA 5 and Proposition 16 in 2020. In 2023, Low also supported ACA 7, a narrower effort "that would allow state agencies to consider race if academic research shows evidence those race-based programs could work."

In 2016, Low introduced AB 1887 that would ban all California state-funded travel to states that enacted laws to discriminate against individuals based upon sexual orientation, gender identity, and gender expression, that was supported by U.S. House of Representatives Minority Leader Nancy Pelosi. The California state-funded travel ban was replaced in 2023 with an advertising campaign.

In 2016, New York Magazine identified Low as a potential United States presidential candidate in 2024 along with nine other young Democrats who, like Obama, have unusual ambition.

In the 2017–2018 session, The Sacramento Bee identified Low as California's most prolific lawmaker, where he had the most bills signed by any member of the state legislature by Governor Jerry Brown. He has also been credited with driving the future of Uber and Lyft in the California State Legislature.

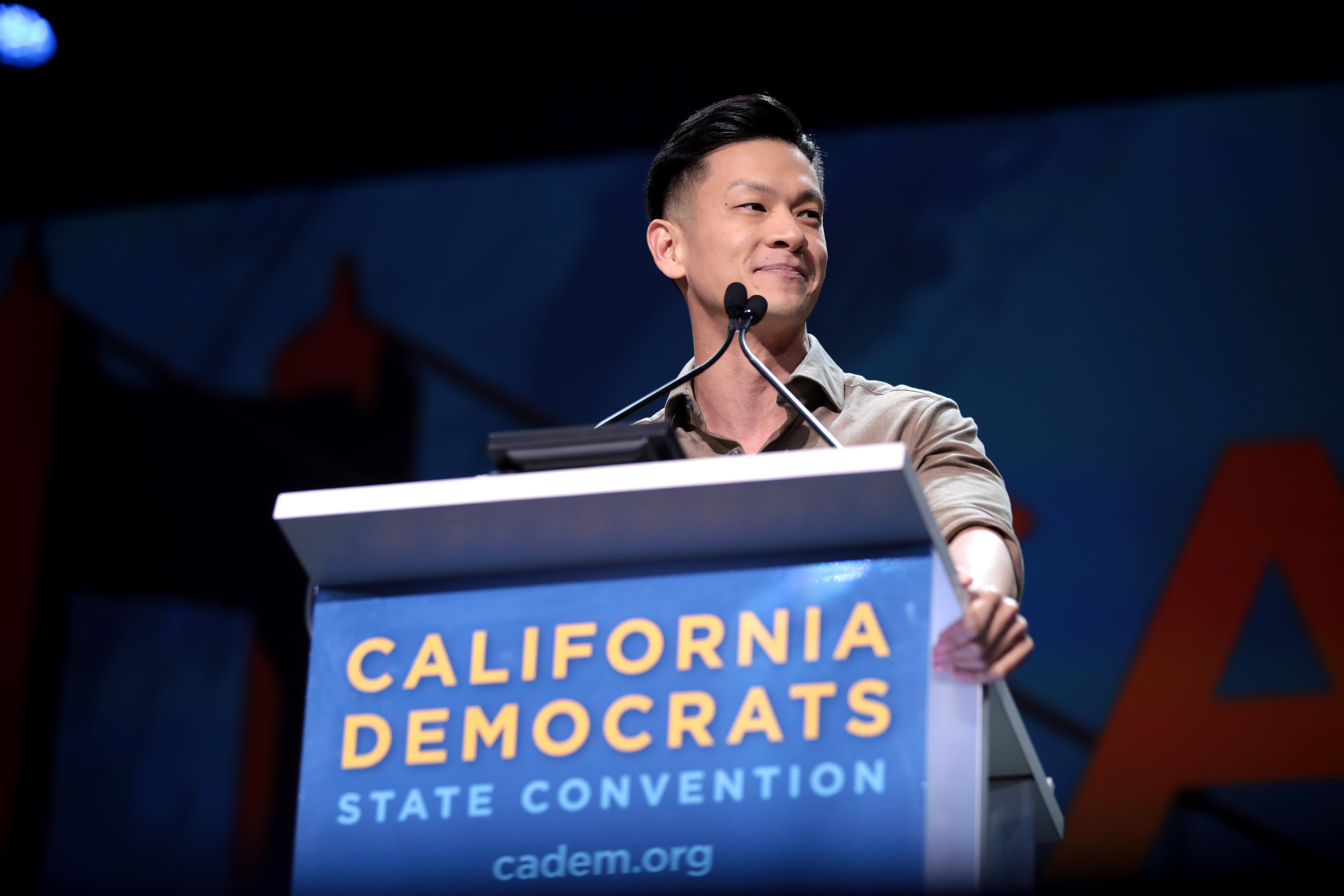
Low speaking at the 2019 California Democratic Party State Convention

In 2019, Low introduced AB-57, which would allow candidates with birth names in character-based languages—such as Chinese, Japanese, and Korean—to use those names in voter requested translated ballots. Previously, candidates such as Fiona Ma have had transliterated versions of their name (e.g. Fei O Na Ma) appear on translated ballots. The bill also required candidates without character based birth names to phonetically translate their names on translated ballots, unless they prove that they are known under a different name within the target community. AB-57 was signed into law by Governor Gavin Newsom in July 2019 and went into effect in 2020.

In 2023 in SB 815, language added by Low in AB 2098, was removed from California Law due to concerns it was unconstitutional being tested in Court. Judge William B. Shubb prevented any doctors from being punished during the one year the "anti-misinformation" language was on the books.

In 2023, Low announced that he would be running for Congress in California's 16th congressional district, help by Representative Anna Eshoo, who announced that she would be retiring after the 2024 election.

== 2024 U.S. House of Representatives election ==
In December 2023, Low announced his intention to run for California's 16th congressional district, which was held by retiring incumbent Anna Eshoo. After the primary in March 2024, Low and Santa Clara County supervisor Joe Simitian repeatedly traded the second-place position multiple times during the vote count. By April 3, 2024, both Low and Simitian tied with 30,249 votes each and were expected to advance to the general election under a stipulation by California elections code regarding a second-place tie in primary elections. Both campaigns released statements indicating that they intended to compete in the general election.

However, after a poll believed to be conducted on behalf of supporters of first-placed Sam Liccardo testing two-way match-ups was fielded, two residents of the district, including former Liccardo campaign finance director and current donor Jonathan Padilla, requested a recount; Liccardo himself was ineligible to do so because he does not live in the district. Liccardo's campaign denied responsibility, though they agreed the recount was necessary, saying "every vote should be counted."

At the conclusion of the recount, Simitian was ultimately eliminated and Low advanced to the general election by a 5-vote margin.

In October 2024, good-government group Defend the Vote filed an FEC complaint against Low, alleging that he had spent nearly $600,000 from his state campaign account on ads that were distributed across the congressional district. Defend the Vote argued that the move violated federal campaign finance laws, as state campaigns can accept higher individual contributions than federal campaigns, and can receive political action committee and corporation donations directly.

In wake of the expenditures, an attorney for Liccardo sent cease and desist letters to five TV stations that broadcast the ads. The Mercury News Editorial Board reaffirmed their endorsement of Liccardo, criticizing Low for “putting political self-interest ahead of campaign integrity.”

== Post-legislative career ==
In March 2025, Low was elected as the president of the LGBTQ+ Victory Fund and Leadership Institute, succeeding Annise Parker.

In March 2025, the California Fair Political Practices Commission fined Low $106,000 for campaign finance violations after he admitted trying to conceal payments to actor Alec Baldwin to appear at his campaign rallies, which Low had previously claimed had happened on Baldwin's "own accord." Low had utilized a nonprofit he operated (The Foundation for California’s Technology and Innovation Economy) to pay Baldwin, and messages between organizers proved that he had attempted to hide the payments. Low was also criticized by the agency for failing to keep track of campaign transactions, missing the deadline to disclose nonprofit finances, and illegally shutting down his campaign account before reimbursing his nonprofit.

== Electoral history ==
=== California State Assembly ===
2014 California State Assembly 28th district election
Primary election
Party	Candidate	Votes	%
Democratic	Evan Low	30,807	39.7
Republican	Chuck Page	20,895	26.9
Democratic	Barry Chang	19,156	24.7
Republican	Michael Hunsweck	6,732	8.7
Total votes		77,590	100.0
General election
Democratic	Evan Low	71,239	59.4
Republican	Chuck Page	48,645	40.6
Total votes		119,884	100.0
Democratic hold			

2016 California State Assembly 28th district election
Primary election
Party	Candidate	Votes	%
Democratic	Evan Low (incumbent)	83,038	71.5
Republican	Nicholas Sclavos	33,154	28.5
Total votes		116,192	100.0
General election
Democratic	Evan Low (incumbent)	136,547	70.0
Republican	Nicholas Sclavos	58,641	30.0
Total votes		195,188	100.0
Democratic hold			

2018 California State Assembly 28th district election
Primary election
Party	Candidate	Votes	%
Democratic	Evan Low (incumbent)	77,011	70.8
Republican	Michael L. Snyder	31,776	29.2
Total votes		108,787	100.0
General election
Democratic	Evan Low (incumbent)	130,815	71.1
Republican	Michael L. Snyder	53,195	28.9
Total votes		184,010	100.0
Democratic hold			

2020 California State Assembly 28th district election
Primary election
Party	Candidate	Votes	%
Democratic	Evan Low (incumbent)	96,976	71.1
Republican	Carlos Rafael Cruz	32,136	23.5
No party preference	Sam Ross	7,350	5.4
Total votes		136,462	100.0
General election
Democratic	Evan Low (incumbent)	166,733	71.6
Republican	Carlos Rafael Cruz	65,976	28.4
Total votes		232,709	100.0
Democratic hold			

After redistricting added Campbell to Assemblymember Marc Berman's district, Low announced he would run in the new 26th district spanning Sunnyvale, Cupertino, and Santa Clara.

2022 California State Assembly 26th district election
Primary election
Party	Candidate	Votes	%
Democratic	Evan Low (incumbent)	45,916	66.9
Republican	Tim Gorsulowsky	16,289	23.7
Democratic	Long Jiao	6,434	9.4
Total votes		68,639	100.0
General election
Democratic	Evan Low (incumbent)	81,595	74.0
Republican	Tim Gorsulowsky	28,616	26.0
Total votes		136,462	100.0
Democratic hold			

=== U.S. House of Representatives ===
2024 California's 16th congressional district election (final recount primary results on May 1, 2024)
Party	Candidate	Votes	%
Democratic	Sam Liccardo	38,492	21.1
Democratic	Evan Low	30,261	16.6
Democratic	Joe Simitian	30,256	16.6
Republican	Peter Ohtaki	23,283	12.8
Democratic	Peter Dixon	14,677	8.1
Democratic	Rishi Kumar	12,383	6.8
Republican	Karl Ryan	11,563	6.3
Democratic	Julie Lythcott-Haims	11,386	6.2
Democratic	Ahmed Mostafa	5,814	3.2
Democratic	Greg Tanaka	2,421	1.3
Democratic	Joby Bernstein	1,652	0.9
Total votes		182,188	100.0
General election
Democratic	Sam Liccardo	179,583	58.2
Democratic	Evan Low	128,893	41.8
Total votes		308,476	100.0
Democratic hold			

== Honors ==
San Francisco Mayor Gavin Newsom issued a proclamation naming June 5, 2006, "Evan Low Day" in the City and County of San Francisco.

Assemblymember Low has been named "Legislator of the Year" by the Internet Association, TechNet, The Computing Technology Industry Association, California Faculty Association, Cellular Telecommunications Industry Association, California District Attorneys Association and Faculty Association of California Community Colleges.
