= California's 26th district =

California's 26th district may refer to:

- California's 26th congressional district
- California's 26th State Assembly district
- California's 26th State Senate district
