= Patrick Ahrens =

American politician

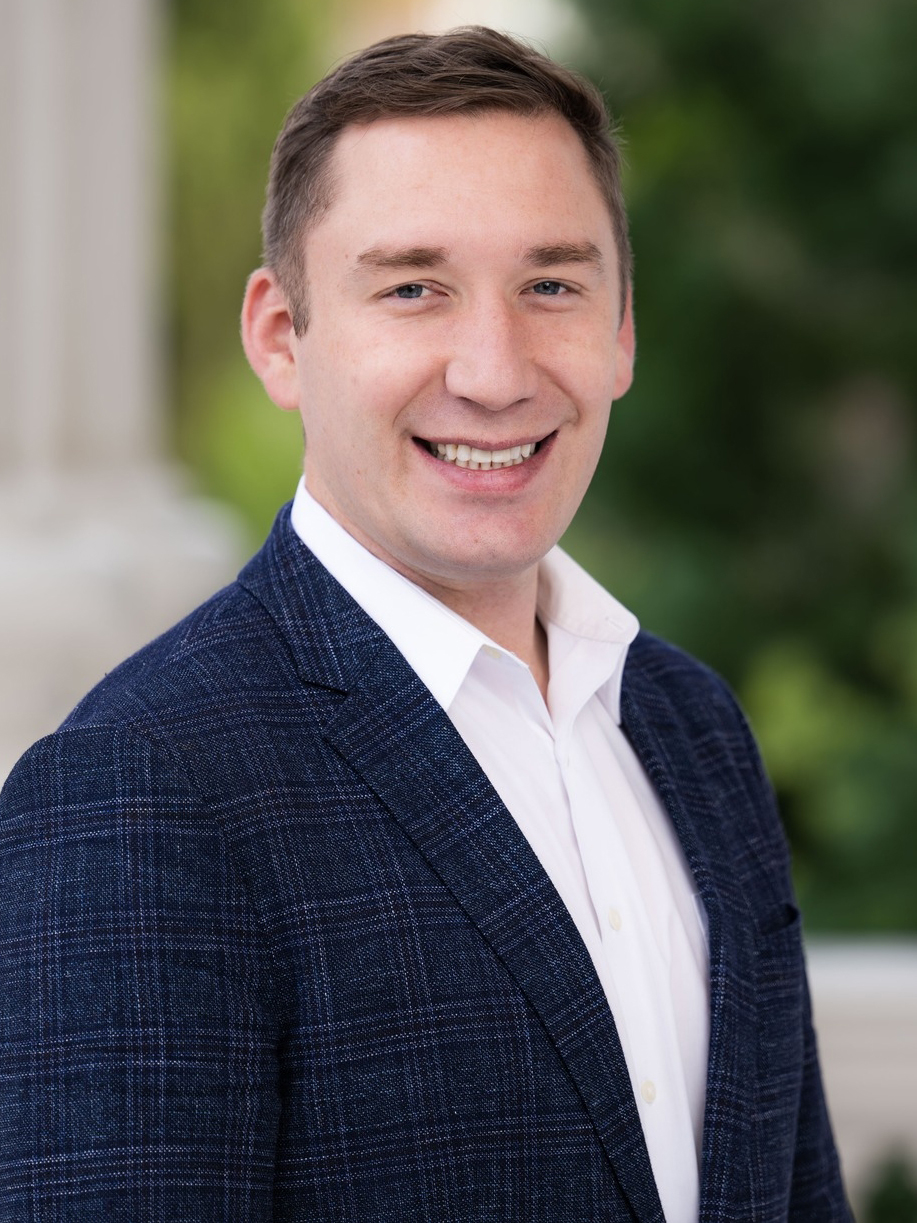
- Official portrait, 2024

Member of the California State Assembly from the 26th district
- Incumbent
- Assumed office December 2, 2024
- Preceded by: Evan Low

Personal details
- Born: Patrick James Ahrens; September 12, 1989 (age 37) San Jose, California, U.S.
- Party: Democratic
- Education: De Anza College (AA); University of California, Los Angeles (BA); San Jose State University (MPA)
- Website: Legislative website

Patrick James Ahrens (born September 12, 1989) is an American politician who is a member of the California State Assembly for the 26th district since 2024. A Democrat, he served on the Foothill–De Anza Community College District Board of Trustees and as a district director for his predecessor, Evan Low, and is considered to be Low's protegé.

== Early life and education ==
Ahrens grew up in household that struggled with substance addiction and he experienced homelessness while attending college. Ahrens was the first person in his family to attend college, graduating with an associate degree from De Anza College, a bachelor’s degree in political science from the University of California Los Angeles, and a Master of Public Administration from San Jose State University. He was a graduate of the federal Head Start program.

== Career ==
Ahrens worked for U.S. Representative Janice Hahn in Washington, D.C., where he met Evan Low. He would go on to serve as a district director for Low. In 2014, he served as field director then campaign manager of Paul Fong's unsuccessful bid for the San Jose City Council.

He was first elected to the Foothill-De Anza Community College District Board of Trustees in 2018 and selected as president of the board on December 13, 2021.

== California State Assembly ==
Ahrens ran for the California State Assembly in the 26th district in 2024 to succeed incumbent Evan Low, who ran for the U.S. House of Representatives. He advanced to the general election with fellow Democrat Tara Sreekrishnan, a Santa Clara County School Board Trustee and legislative staffer to state Senator Dave Cortese. The race attracted $3.7 million in outside spending including $2 million boosting Ahrens. Ahrens defeated Sreekrishnan receiving 56% of votes cast (76,807) compared to her 44% of votes cast (60,392) in the general election.

=== Tenure ===
On October 5, 2025, governor Gavin Newsom signed Ahrens' bill repealing the state's ability to charge parents of chronically truant students with a misdemeanor. In a The Sacramento Bee opinion piece published on October 15, 2025, Ahrens and Republican assemblymember Heather Hadwick called on the U.S. Congress to fully fund the Head Start program. In December 2025, Ahrens issued a statement condemning the California State University Board of Trustees' decision to raise the system's administrators salaries, which he stated were already too high.

== Personal life ==
Ahrens had a twin brother, Sean, who died of cancer.

== Electoral history ==
2024 California State Assembly 26th district election
Primary election
Party	Candidate	Votes	%
Democratic	Patrick Ahrens	25,057	34.4
Democratic	Tara Sreekrishnan	19,617	26.9
Republican	Sophie Yan Song	15,965	21.9
Democratic	Omar Din	8,779	12.1
Libertarian	Bob Goodwyn	2,172	3.0
No party preference	Ashish Garg	1,221	1.7
Total votes		72,811	100.0
General election
Democratic	Patrick Ahrens	76,807	56.0
Democratic	Tara Sreekrishnan	60,392	44.0
Total votes		137,199	100.0
Democratic hold			
