= Paul Fong =

American politician (born 1952)

Paul Fong 方文忠
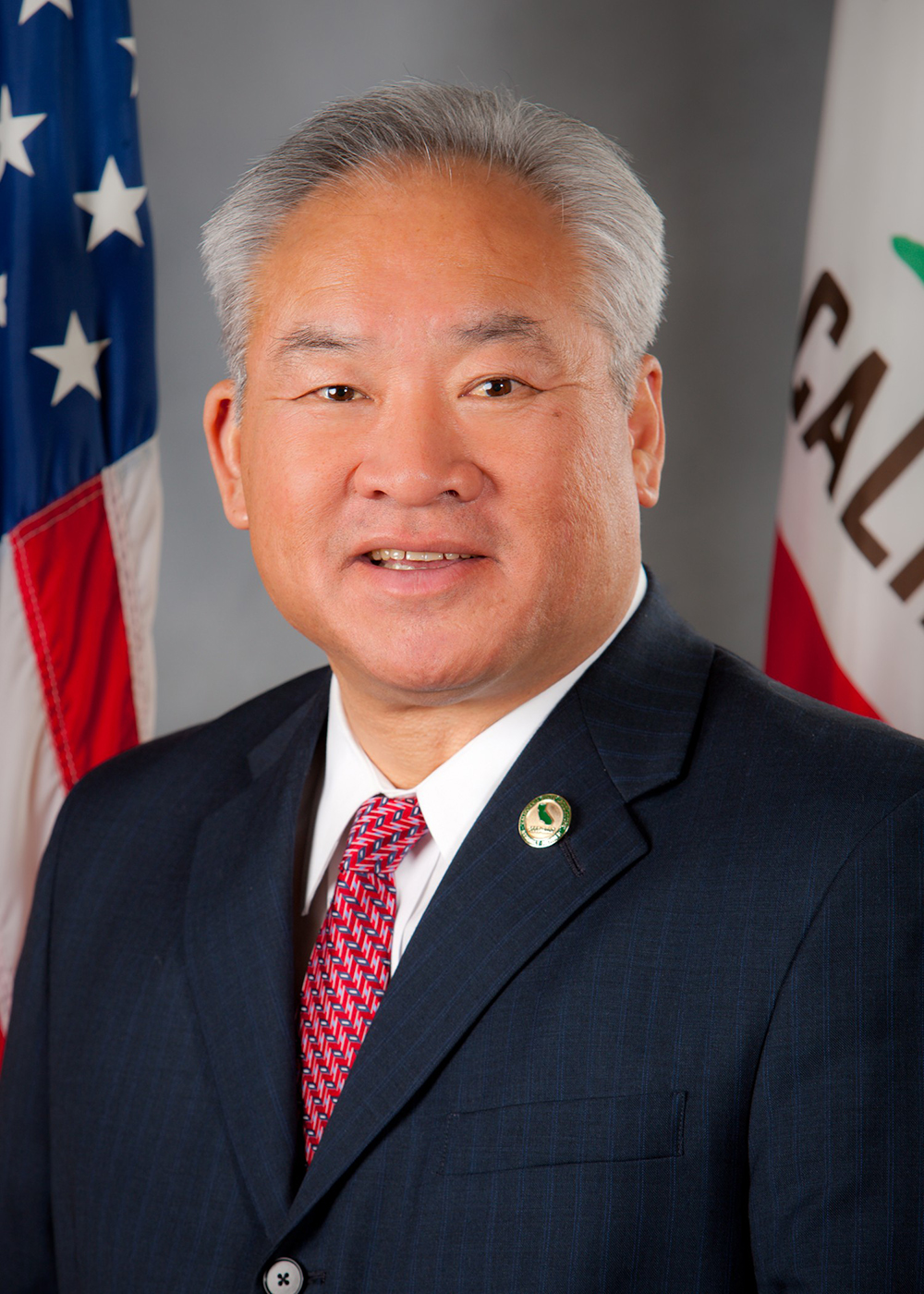

Member of the California State Assembly
- In office December 1, 2008 – December 1, 2014
- Preceded by: Sally Lieber
- Succeeded by: Evan Low
- Constituency: 22nd district (2008–2012); 28th district (2012–2014)

Personal details
- Born: August 5, 1952 (age 74) Portuguese Macau
- Party: Democratic
- Children: 3
- Education: University of San Francisco; San Jose State University
- Profession: Politician

Paul J. Fong (Chinese: 方文忠; pinyin: Fāng Wénzhōng) (born August 5, 1952) is an American politician. He is a former Democratic California State Assembly member from the 28th district.

== Earlier years ==
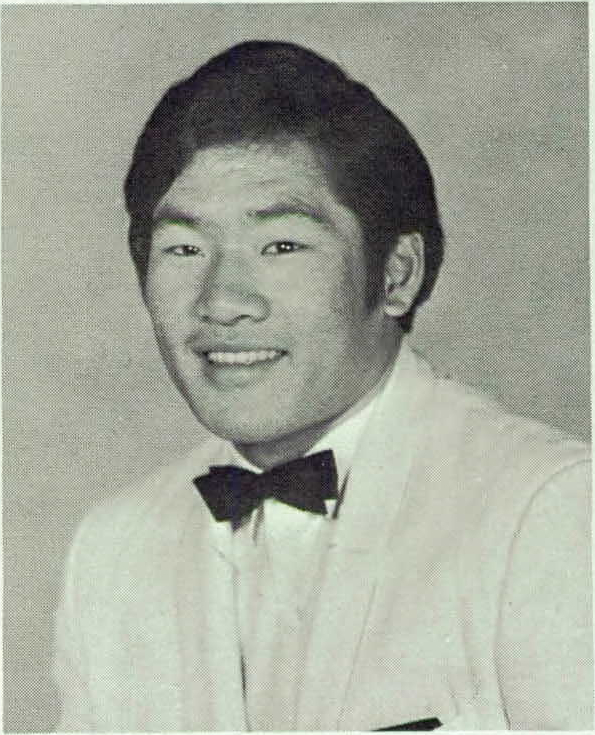
Fong in Sunnyvale High School's 1971 yearbook

Fong was born in Macau, then a Portuguese colony, in 1952. When he was three years old, his family moved from Macau to the San Francisco Bay Area.

In the early 1970s, Fong was a quarterback for the Sunnyvale High School football team. Fong then attended De Anza College and played on its football team. He then attended San Jose State University where he earned his B.A. in Sociology and his master's degree in public administration.

In succeeding years, Fong has taught Asian-American studies at De Anza College and Political Science at Evergreen Valley College. He was elected to the board of trustees of the Foothill–De Anza Community College District in 1993 and served as a trustee until 2008, when he left the board due to his election to the California State Assembly.

== Public service in California State Assembly ==
Fong was a full-term member of the California Assembly, completing three full terms of service as a public policymaker. During that tenure, Fong introduced and passed legislation, such as working with the Sea Turtle Restoration Project to declare the Pacific leatherback sea turtle the California official state marine reptile, and legislation to save sharks. Fong has received the 2009 Mover of Mountains Award, the 2007 Norm Mineta Lifetime Achievement Award, the 2007 Asian Pacific American Leadership Institute Civic Leadership Award, and the 2007 Mayor's Award of Excellence. In the assembly, Fong was an activist for education, civil rights, affordable housing, and the environment.

=== 2008 election ===
Fong succeeded term-limited Democratic assemblywoman Sally Lieber, who was also the outgoing California State Assembly Speaker Pro Tempore.

In the primary, Fong defeated Santa Clara City Councilman Dominic Caserta, Santa Clara County Board of Education trustee Anna Song and Cupertino mayor Kris Wang. In the November 4, 2008, general election he beat his Republican opponent Brent Oya by 76.2% to 23.8%.

=== 2010 election ===
Fong won re-election in November 2010 by beating Republican Eric "Shooter" Hickok and Libertarian T.J. Campbell. Fong received 67 percent of the vote, Hickok received 27 percent and Campbell received 6 percent.

=== 2012 election ===
Because of redistricting, Fong's home city of Cupertino was placed in the 28th Assembly district, so Fong ran for and won reelection in that district. His opponent was Chad Walsh.

=== 2014 election ===
Term limits delineated in California law do not permit Fong to serve more than three two-year terms in the Assembly. Fong's seat in the assembly was retained as a Democratic seat by Fong protégé Evan Low. Fong then secured the District 1 seat on the San Jose City Council, however, after advancing in the primary, Fong was beaten in the general election by fellow Democrat Charles "Chappie" Jones.

== Shark fin law ==
Fong introduced Assembly Bill 376 (AB 376) which was passed by the legislature and signed into law. This law bans the possession, sale, and distribution of shark fins, with some exceptions. The intent of the law is to discourage shark finning, a practice which involves cutting off the tails and fins of living sharks, which are then thrown back into the ocean to die.

The primary use of shark fins is in shark fin soup, an expensive delicacy which because of its high cost was in former times restricted to being consumed by the Chinese aristocracy. With increasing availability of shark fin in modern times, shark fin soup is now often served on special occasions such as weddings and banquets, and is available in many Chinese restaurants. Fong, who was born in Macau, says, "Anything that is unhealthy, that the culture is practicing, we should stop doing it. We used to bind women's feet and that was unhealthy for the woman". Hawaii's former first lady Vicky Cayetano drew a similar comparison: "shark fin soup is about as cultural as bound feet." However, State Senator Leland Yee argued that the bill constituted "the wrong approach and an unfair attack on Asian culture and cuisine... rather than launch just another attack on Asian American culture, the proponents of the ban on shark fin soup should work with us to strengthen conservation efforts."

AB 376 was approved by the California Assembly on 5/23/11 by a vote of 65 to 8. It was approved by the California Senate on 9/6/11 by a vote of 25 to 9. It was signed into law by Governor Jerry Brown on 10/07/11.

Pursuant to the new law, it became illegal on January 1, 2013, for any person in California to possess, sell, offer for sale, trade, or distribute a shark fin, unless the person holds a special license or permit for that purpose issued by the California Department of Fish and Wildlife.

Similar laws have been enacted in the states of Hawaii, Washington, Oregon, and Illinois, and in Venezuela, Guam, and the Commonwealth of the Northern Mariana Islands.

A member of China's National People's Congress has submitted a formal written proposal to that Congress that shark fin be banned in the People's Republic of China. Also, the Chinese government has announced that it will prohibit official banquets from serving shark fin soup by the end of 2015.

A poll commissioned by the Monterey Bay Aquarium found that 70 percent of the Chinese-American voters surveyed favored making it illegal to sell or distribute shark fins.

=== Proponents and opponents ===
Proponents of AB 376 included the Asian Pacific American Ocean Harmony Alliance (APAOHA), Monterey Bay Aquarium, the Humane Society of the United States, WildAid, Sea Stewards, Sierra Club California, California Academy of Sciences, California Coastal Commission, Defenders of Wildlife, Environmental Defense Fund, Food Empowerment Project, Natural Resources Defense Council, and The Nature Conservancy.

Opponents of AB 376 included Asian Food Trade Association, Chung Chou City, Inc., Oriental Food Association, and Stockton Seafood Center. Generally, opponents included shark fin fisheries, traders, and processors, and Chinese restaurants that served shark fin soup. Opponents hired two lobbying firms, Lang Hansen O'Malley & Miller and Sloat Higgins Jensen & Associates, to guide their campaign against AB 376.

Fuller lists of the proponents and opponents are found in the Analysis of AB 376 released by the California State Senate's Committee on Natural Resources and Water.

=== Endorsements ===
Chinese-born NBA Basketball player Yao Ming campaigned for the shark fin ban; he filmed a public service announcement in San Francisco promoting the banning of shark fin soup.

Two Chinese-American candidates in the 2011 San Francisco Mayoral race, David Chiu (President of the San Francisco Board of Supervisors) and Phil Ting (the Assessor-Recorder of the city and county of San Francisco), came out in support of the shark fin ban. Betty Yee (member of California's State Board of Equalization) also endorsed AB 376.

The San Francisco Chronicle and the Los Angeles Times both printed editorials endorsing AB 376.
