= Devon Mathis =

American politician from California

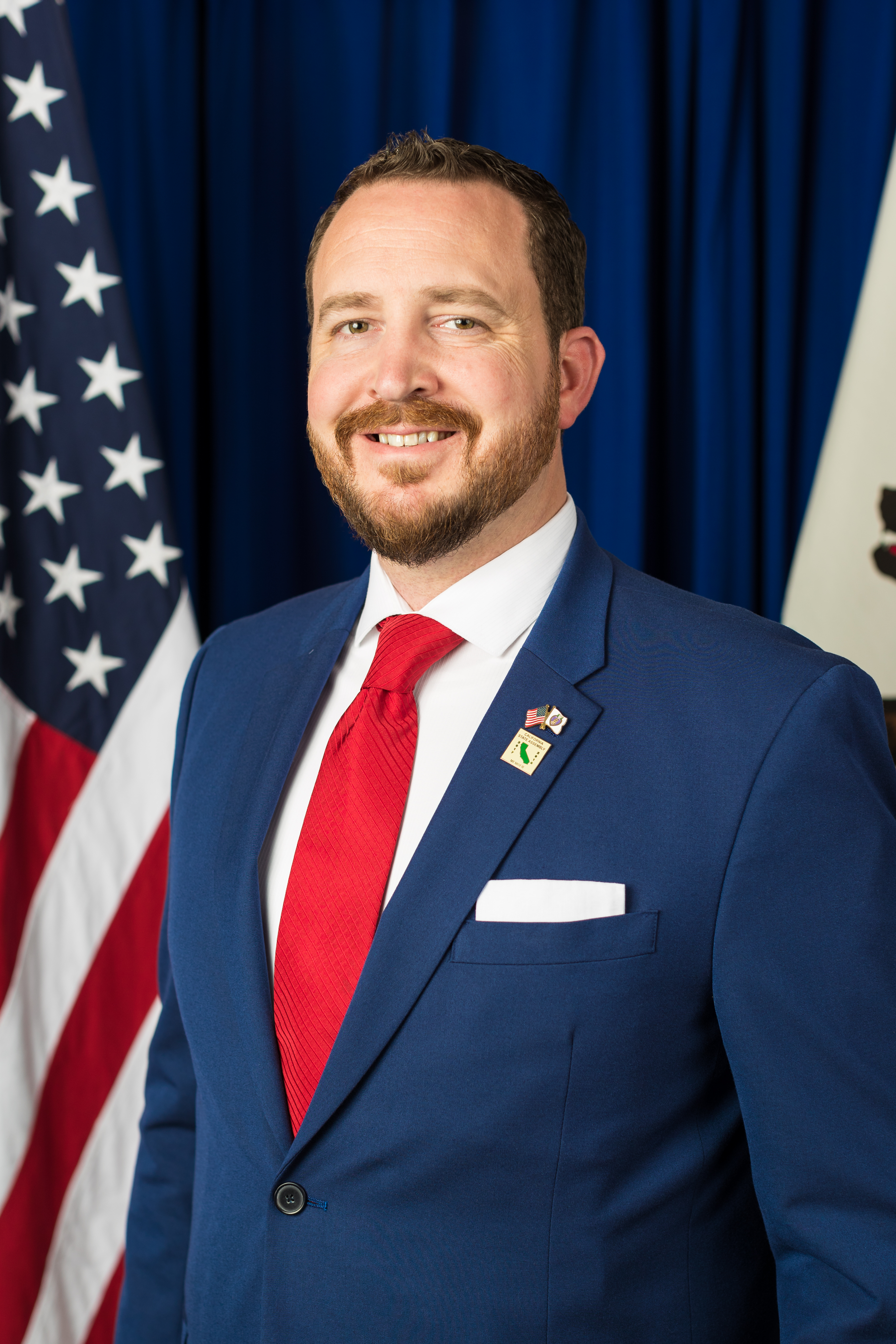

Member of the California Assembly
- In office December 1, 2014 – November 30, 2024
- Preceded by: Connie Conway
- Succeeded by: Alexandra Macedo
- Constituency: 26th district (2014–2022); 33rd district (2022–2024)

Personal details
- Born: Devon John Mathis; September 21, 1982 (age 44) Porterville, California, U.S.
- Party: Republican
- Children: 5
- Education: Porterville College (AA); California State University, Fresno (BA); George Washington University (MPS)
- Website: State Assembly website

Military service
- Branch/service: United States Army
- Rank: Sergeant
- Unit: Army National Guard
- Battles/wars: Iraq War
- Awards: Purple Heart; Army Commendation Medal

Devon John Mathis (born September 21, 1982) is an American politician who served as a member of the California State Assembly from the 33rd district, which is located in Kings County, western Tulare County, and a small part of southern Fresno County. He served as the Caucus Operations Chair for the California State Assembly Republican Caucus.

== Early life and education ==
Mathis was born in Porterville, California. He earned an Associate of Arts degree in Social Sciences from Porterville College and Bachelor of Arts in Public Administration from California State University, Fresno. Mathis graduated from George Washington University earning a Master of Professional Studies in Strategic Public Relations in 2021.

== Career ==
Before joining the Assembly, Mathis served for 10 years as a Sergeant in the Army National Guard, including two tours in Iraq. During his second tour in Iraq, Mathis was severely injured in a roadside bomb attack, for which he was awarded a Purple Heart.

In 2014, he unexpectedly defeated Woodlake Mayor Rudy Mendoza, a fellow Republican who was better known and had more support from established Republicans. Mendoza sought a rematch in 2016, but Mathis defeated him again in the primary. Mathis, who had no previous political experience, ran on his status as a former Army National Guard sergeant and veterans advocate.

In July 2017 Mathis, along with four other Republican assemblymen, voted "Yes" on AB 398 to extend California's Cap and Trade program.

In 2018, Mathis faced a serious primary challenge, winning only 30% of the vote and narrowly eliminating Republican Visalia Mayor Warren Gubler. But in the November general election, he rallied and defeated Democratic Tulare City Councilman Jose Sigala with 58% of the vote.

Mathis was not seriously challenged in 2020 or in 2022.

He served as the Vice Chair of the Assembly Committee on Agriculture and the Vice Chair of the Assembly Committee on Water, Parks, and Wildlife. Mathis also served on the Assembly Committee on Appropriations, the Committee on Government Organization, the Committee on Military and Veteran Affairs, the Committee on Natural Resources, and the Utilities and Energy Committee.

Mathis successfully authored 17 bills and 15 resolutions that were chaptered into state law; he was also listed as a joint author of 46 other measures and nine other resolutions.

On November 27, 2023, Mathis announced that he would not be a candidate for re-election.

== Elections ==
=== 2014 California State Assembly ===
California's 26th State Assembly district election, 2014
Primary election
Party	Candidate	Votes	%
Republican	Rudy Mendoza	18,648	40.3
Republican	Devon Mathis	9,497	20.5
Democratic	Carlton Jones	7,943	17.2
Democratic	Ruben Macareno	3,755	8.1
Democratic	Derek A. Thomas	2,872	6.2
Republican	Teresita "Tess" Andres	2,092	4.5
Republican	Esther Barajas	1,473	3.2
Total votes		46,280	100.0
General election
Republican	Devon Mathis	34,683	53.6
Republican	Rudy Mendoza	29,991	46.4
Total votes		64,674	100.0
Republican hold			

=== 2016 California State Assembly ===
California's 26th State Assembly district election, 2016
Primary election
Party	Candidate	Votes	%
Republican	Devon Mathis (incumbent)	28,563	42.4
Democratic	Ruben Macareno	20,536	30.5
Republican	Rudy Mendoza	18,216	27.1
Total votes		67,315	100.0
General election
Republican	Devon Mathis (incumbent)	76,289	63.3
Democratic	Ruben Macareno	44,205	36.7
Total votes		120,494	100.0
Republican hold			

=== 2018 California State Assembly ===
California's 26th State Assembly district election, 2018
Primary election
Party	Candidate	Votes	%
Republican	Devon Mathis (incumbent)	19,081	30.3
Democratic	Jose Sigala	18,794	29.8
Republican	Warren Gubler	17,650	28.0
Republican	Jack Lavers	7,473	11.9
Total votes		62,998	100.0
General election
Republican	Devon Mathis (incumbent)	62,629	57.9
Democratic	Jose Sigala	45,558	42.1
Total votes		108,187	100.0
Republican hold			

=== 2020 California State Assembly ===
2020 California's 26th State Assembly district election
Primary election
Party	Candidate	Votes	%
Republican	Devon Mathis (incumbent)	49,413	61.5%
Democratic	Drew Phelps	30,981	38.5%
Total votes		80,394	100.0%
General election
Republican	Devon Mathis (incumbent)	85,005	54.9%
Democratic	Drew Phelps	69,717	45.1%
Total votes		154,722	100%
Republican hold			

=== 2022 California State Assembly ===
2022 California's 33rd State Assembly district election
Primary election
Party	Candidate	Votes	%
Republican	Devon Mathis (incumbent)	30,987	64.8%
Democratic	Ruben Macareno	7,272	15.2%
Democratic	Jose Sigala	9,528	19.9%
Total votes		47,787	100.0%
General election
Republican	Devon Mathis (incumbent)	52,436	62.5%
Democratic	Jose Sigala	31,486	37.5%
Total votes		83,922	100%
Republican hold			
