= Sunnyvale High School (California) =

High school in California, United States

Information
- Established: 1956
- Closed: 1981
- Mascot: Jets

Sunnyvale High School was the second public high school in the city of Sunnyvale, California. Opened in January 1956 as part of the Fremont Union High School District, it was closed in 1981. In a nod to the nearby NAS Moffett Field, SHS adopted the Jets as its school mascot, and their fight song was to the tune of the U.S. Air Force song. Since 1991, the former SHS campus at 562 N. Britton Avenue has been home to The King's Academy, a Christian middle/high school.

== Alumni ==
- Benny Brown, 1976 Olympic 4 × 400 meters relay gold medalist
- Paul Fong, former member of the California State Assembly
- Robert Handa, Emmy winning and Associated Press Reporter of the Year

== See also ==
- List of closed secondary schools in California
