= Ray Williamson =

American politician

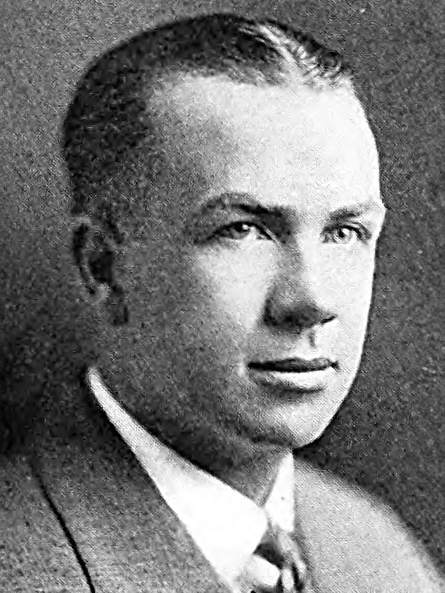

Member of the California State Assembly from the 26th district
- In office January 5, 1925 - January 6, 1941
- Preceded by: Roy Fellom
- Succeeded by: Edward M. Gaffney

Personal details
- Born: May 19, 1895 San Francisco, California
- Died: March 21, 1973 (aged 77) San Francisco, California
- Party: Republican
- Spouse: Pauline Luby (m. 1926)
- Children: 1

Military service
- Branch/service: United States Army
- Battles/wars: World War I

Ray Daniel Williamson Sr. (1895–1973) served in the California State Assembly for the 26th district from 1925 to 1941. During World War I he also served in the United States Army.
