= California state-funded travel ban =

California State Legislature
- Signed into law: September 27, 2016
- Sponsor: Toni Atkins
- Governor: Governor Gavin Newsom
- Resolution: SB 447

California Assembly Bill 1887, or AB 1887, is a state statute that banned state-funded and sponsored travel to states with laws deemed discriminatory against the LGBTQ community. The bill includes exceptions for some types of travel the state has defined as necessary. Before the bill's repeal, travel to 26 states was banned. The law passed on September 27, 2016, and applied to four states. It was repealed as per Senate Bill 447 on September 19, 2023.

== History ==
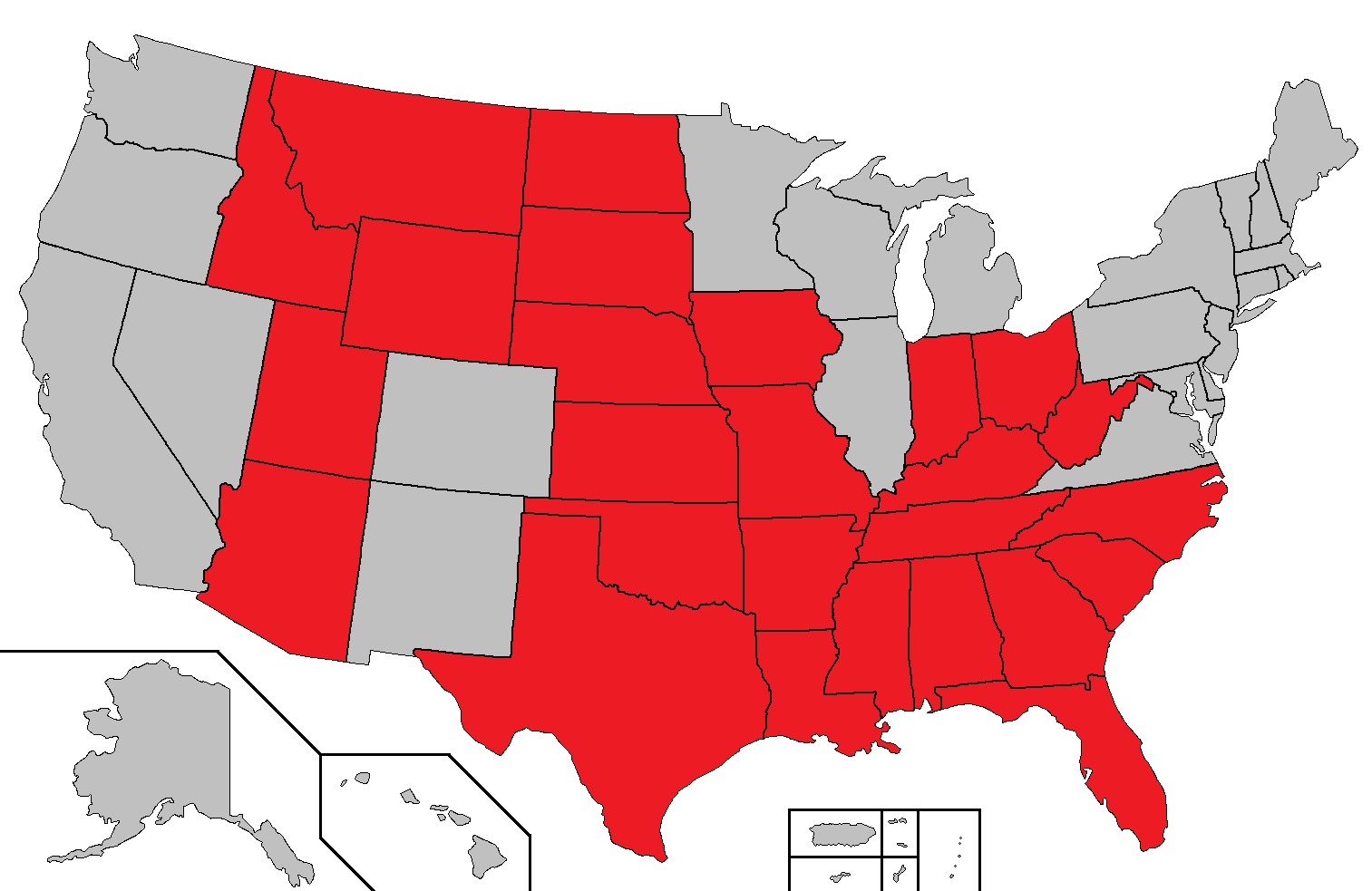
Map of states affected by the California state-funded travel ban, highlighted in red, before its repeal in September 2023

The law was designed to target states that passed laws deemed anti-LGBTQ, such as regulating bathroom access, with an economic boycott. Evan Low authored the bill, with Toni Atkins being the primary sponsor.

In 2016, the state of California began restricting travel to states with anti-LGBTQ+ laws after North Carolina passed the bathroom bill, a state statute preventing transgender people from using restrooms and other public facilities that matched their gender identities. In July 2022, Rob Bonta, the California Attorney General, announced that California would add more states to the restricted travel ban as a result of recently passed anti-LGBTQ+ laws in those states, leaving the count at 26 banned states.

After the legislative passage of AB 1887, politicians from California continued to travel to banned states using campaign funds instead of state funds. Sports teams from state colleges and universities have had to find private sponsors to fund travel to banned states where they compete. Attendees of conferences have been affected. In 2022, four states were added to the ban: Utah, Indiana, Louisiana, and Arizona.

=== Repeal ===
Toni Atkins proposed a repeal of the bill in March 2023. It was replaced in September 2023 with new legislation, the Senate Bill 447 (SB 447 or BRIDGE Project) signed into law, promoting inclusion with an advertising campaign. SB 447 was nicknamed BRIDGE Project as an acronym for "Building and Reinforcing Inclusive, Diverse, Gender-Supportive Equality".

In September 2023, a bill passed both houses (with an assembly vote of 64 to 12 and a senate vote of 31 to 6) of the California Legislature that formally repealed the seven-year-old travel-ban legislation. The Governor of California, Gavin Newsom, signed the bill on September 13, 2023.

== List of states banned ==
By July 2023, California had banned state-funded and state-sponsored travel to the following 26 U.S. states:

1. Alabama
2. Arizona
3. Arkansas
4. Florida
5. Georgia
6. Idaho
7. Indiana
8. Iowa
9. Kansas
10. Kentucky
11. Louisiana
12. Mississippi
13. Missouri
14. Montana
15. Nebraska
16. North Carolina
17. North Dakota
18. Ohio
19. Oklahoma
20. South Carolina
21. South Dakota
22. Tennessee
23. Texas
24. Utah
25. West Virginia
26. Wyoming

== Exceptions ==
AB 1887 had exceptions from the ban travel:

- Enforcement of California law, including auditing and revenue collection.
- Litigation
- To meet contractual obligations incurred before January 1, 2017.
- To comply with requests by the federal government to appear before committees.
- To participate in meetings or training required by a grant or required to maintain grant funding.
- To complete job-required training necessary to maintain licensure or similar standards required for holding a position, in the event that comparable training cannot be obtained in California or a different state not subject to the travel prohibition.
- For the protection of public health, welfare, or safety, as determined by the affected agency, department, board, authority, or commission, or by the affected legislative office.

== See also ==
- Travel ban
