= Travel ban =

Restriction of all means of travel

A travel ban is one of a variety of mobility restrictions imposed by governments. Bans can be universal or selective, and temporary or indefinite. Governments may impose geographic restrictions prohibiting visitors from abroad to their jurisdictions, or restrictions on their own citizens traveling to other jurisdictions. Restrictions can also be based on individual status, such as health or vaccination, or as driving bans during extreme weather events. During the COVID-19 pandemic, governments banned entry by residents of some or all other countries. Motivations for travel bans vary in nature with some being economic while others being more so politically motivated.

Travel bans can be imposed by a variety of means, including not issuing travel visas that foreign citizens must acquire to enter the country legally.

== War-related travel bans ==
During a war a country can decide to ban travel to a country or numerous ones even if it is a neutral party in that said conflict. One example is that of the United States in 1939 when it banned travel to any country that was at war with the 1939 Neutrality Act in response to the outbreak of World War II in Europe that year despite being a neutral party at the time. Another example from that decade coming from the United States is that of the 1937 Neutrality Act which banned US citizens from traveling on any ship that was owned by or registered to a country that was at war.

Travel bans relating to wars can also be gender-specific as well with one example being when Ukraine in 2022 banned all males aged 18 to 60 from leaving the country because of the Russian invasion of Ukraine. A travel ban can also be instituted by a supranational union. One example of this is when the European Union banned air travel to Russia in response to the Russian invasion of Ukraine. During the Russian invasion of Ukraine several European countries banned Russians from traveling to their respective countries.

== Bans issued due to foreign relations ==
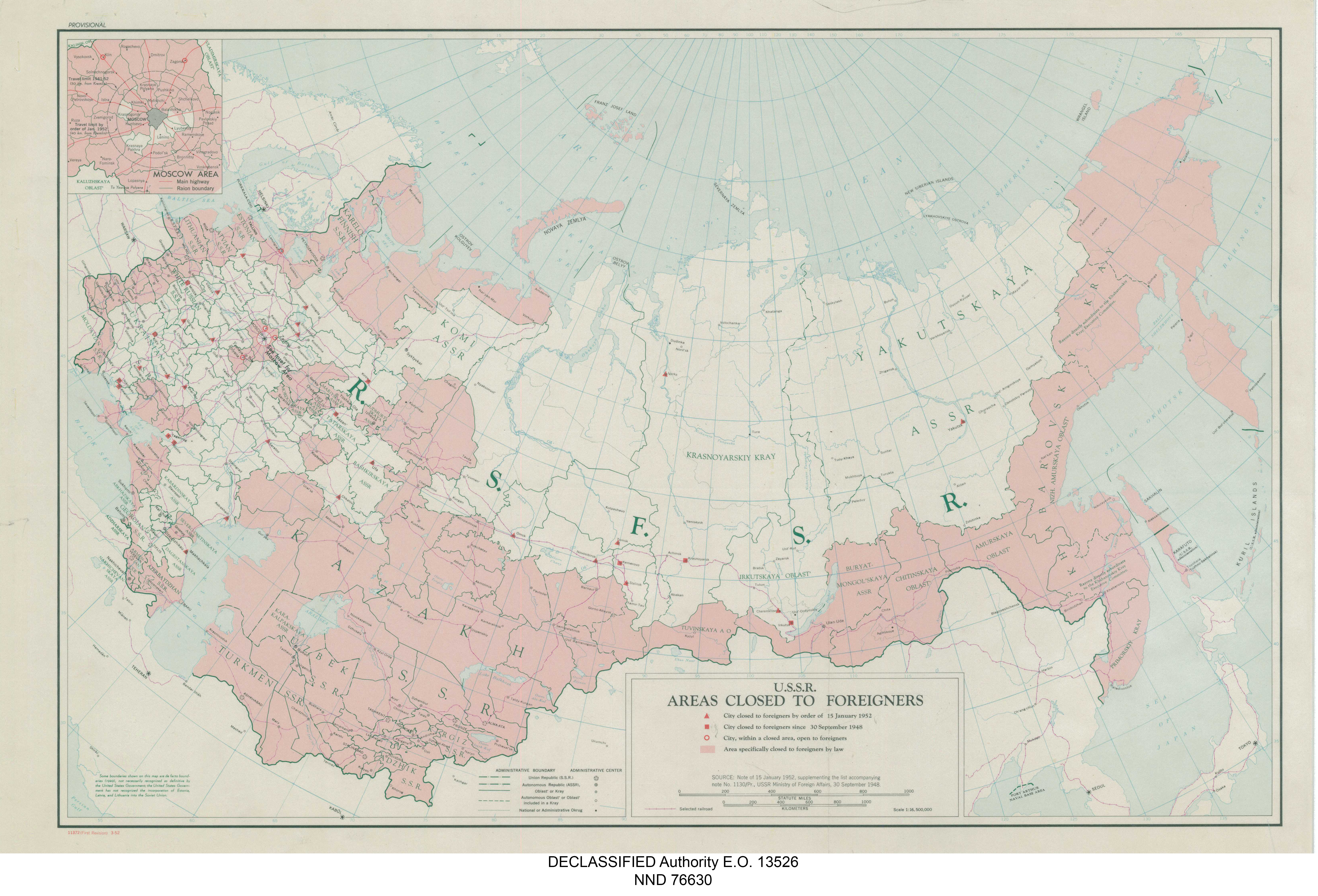
A 1952 map from the US Central Intelligence Agency showing areas of the Soviet Union that were banned from being visited by foreigners

A country can ban travel to certain countries based on their status of foreign relations and/or if they are viewed with hostility by a said country. During the Cold War the United States banned travel by declaring travel invalid to communist countries starting with Yugoslavia in 1947 before expanding to Hungary (1949), Bulgaria (1950), Czechoslovakia (1951) and Albania, Bulgaria, China, Czechoslovakia, Hungary, Poland, Romania along with the Soviet Union in 1952 unless it was "specifically endorsed". Countries can also ban travel by certain foreign nationals to specific areas of a said country as done during the Cold War by the United States to nationals of the Soviet Union and vice versa; with the United States restrictions remaining in place from 1955 to 1962. Japan from the end of World War II until 1964 when they hosted the 1964 Tokyo Summer Olympics banned traveling abroad for pleasure purposes. American restrictions on travel to China ended in 1971 China banned its citizens from traveling abroad and tourists from abroad until after the death of Mao Zedong when the country began to allow limited travel to Hong Kong and Macau starting in 1983.

With the end of the Cold War, travel became more liberalized. Romania would allow its citizens to travel freely to Western countries in January 1990. Albania during the Cold War was one of Eastern Europe's most isolated countries and American tourists were banned from visiting until June 1990 with the exception of if one had family in Albania. Another example of liberalization that happened at close to the same time was seen in South Korea which started to allow all its citizens to travel freely abroad starting in 1989 as previously they wanted to prevent contact with those who believed in communism and to prevent their currency from being weakened. The 1988 Summer Olympics which were held in Seoul are credited in part to this as it helped open up the country to the rest of the world. China has also liberalized its travel since the end of the Cold War.

=== Economic concerns ===
Countries can limit travel not just out of purely diplomatic relations but also out of economic related concerns. In East Asia after World War II, many countries in East Asia limited or banned outbound travel from their own citizens but allowed foreign citizens to visit as a way to bring in foreign money which could help pay for their industrialization.

== Pandemic ==
Due to the spread of COVID-19, many countries restricted international and/or domestic travel.

During the COVID-19 pandemic the United States implemented a travel ban for most of those arriving from member countries of the European Union, United Kingdom, India, Brazil, China and Japan with flights coming from India being banned starting on May 4, 2021. U.S. citizens and those with permanent residency were still allowed to enter. The American travel ban lasted until November 8, 2021. During the COVID-19 pandemic the United States closed the US-Mexico border to prevent the spread of COVID-19.

Mexico was one country that did not institute a full border closure during the COVID-19 pandemic.

Australia implemented some of the strictest measures during the COVID-19 pandemic with Australia closing it borders to any non-residents and prohibited Australians from going abroad "with a few exceptions". Australia implemented a travel ban on China starting on February 1, 2020, when it was mostly confined to China with Iran (February 29), South Korea (March 5) and Italy (March 10) being later added until international borders were closed entirely on March 20. Australia lifted this ban in November 2021.

== Weather-related bans ==
A travel ban can be instituted during an extreme weather event. Local governments can ban driving in an attempt to clear major roadways, as was the case during the Late December 2022 North American winter storm. In some cases they may be enforced by military police.

== List of travel bans ==
Overview of restrictions on Israelis' travel freedoms in 2025: State of Israel Countries that reject Israeli passports Countries that reject Israeli passports and non-Israeli passports that have a used/unused Israeli visa stamp, Egyptian / Jordanian border stamps issued at a crossing with Israel or have been used for any form of travel to Israel* *Included in this category is Iraq, but not Iraq's autonomous Kurdistan Region, which does accept Israeli visitors with full freedom of movement (see Israel–Kurdistan Region relations)

Countries affected by the US 2025 Proclamation 10949 Nationals banned from traveling to the U.S. Nationals partially restricted from traveling to the U.S.

=== Current ===
- Countries that do not accept Israeli passports
- American ban on travel to North Korea (2017–present), a ban was placed on Americans using US passports to travel to, from or through North Korea starting in 2017 in response to the death of the American student Otto Warmbier.
- Estonian ban on Russian travelers (2022–present)
- Latvian ban on Russian travelers (2022–present)
- Lithuanian ban on Russian travelers (2022–present)
- Finnish ban on Russian travelers (2022–present)
- Polish ban on Russian travelers (2022–present)
- Czech ban on Russian travelers (2022–present)
- Dominican Republic's ban on travelers from Equatorial Guinea including anyone who has been to Equatorial Guinea after February 8, 2023, due to the 2023 Marburg virus disease outbreak in Equatorial Guinea
- Norwegian ban on Russian travelers (2024–present)
- Proclamation 10949, government restriction on entry to the United States, effective since June 9, 2025
- Nigerien ban on the issuance of visas to Americans in response to the US ban on Nigeriens (2025-present)

=== Former ===
- Entry into Bhutan by foreigners was prohibited until the 1970s unless granted permission by the country's royal family.
- Australian COVID-19 travel ban (2020–2021), prohibited Australians from travelling abroad almost entirely with a few exceptions and closed its borders off to non-residents because of the COVID-19 pandemic. Australia's travel restrictions during the pandemic were considered to be the toughest in the world.

==== Travel bans of the United States ====
- Ban on travel to China (1952-1971).
- United States embargo against Cuba, travel, commercial, economic, and financial embargoes imposed by the United States on Cuba. Travel to Cuba was banned from 1963 to 1977.
- United States ban to travel on Vietnam (1975–1991), Americans could travel to Vietnam but not directly as they had to transit through another country.
- Ban on travel to Iran (1980-1981).
- Ban on travel to Libya (1981–2004), created after the Gulf of Sidra incident lasting until 2004 when Libyan leader Muammar Gaddafi denounced terrorism and weapons of mass destruction.
- Ban on travel to Lebanon (1981-1997).
- Ban on travel to Iraq (1991–2003), lasted from the Gulf War until Saddam Hussein was overthrown during the Iraq War. Kuwait was also included for some time.
- California state-funded travel ban (2016–2023)
- Travel bans under the Trump administrations
  - Executive Order 13769, government restriction on entry to the United States, effective January 27, 2017
  - Executive Order 13780, government restriction on entry to the United States, effective March 16, 2017

== See also ==
- List of citizenships refused entry to foreign states
- Freedom of movement
- Persona non grata, a diplomatic measure prohibiting a person from entering or remaining in a country
- Legal challenges to the Trump travel ban
- Travel restrictions related to the COVID-19 pandemic
- Protective sequestration, to prevent the spread of disease
- White Australia policy
