= Kris Wang =

American politician

Mayor of Cupertino
- In office 2007–2014
- Succeeded by: Barry Chang

Personal details
- Born: Taiwan
- Occupation: Politician

Kris Wang is an American politician and a former mayor of Cupertino, California.

== Early life ==
She was born and raised in Taiwan and came to the United States to pursue higher education. Wang received her Bachelor of Science degree in statistics and master's degree in business management from University of Phoenix, and her graduate studies in computer science at San Jose State University.

== Career ==
Wang was the Cupertino City Commissioner. In the Nov 2003 election, Wang received 34.25% of the vote for Cupertino City Council.

Wang was first elected to Cupertino City Council in 2003 and re-elected in November 2007. She was the city's first female Chinese-American councilwoman and vice mayor. Wang served as the mayor of Cupertino in 2007 and 2010. Her inauguration in 2007 made her the first female mayor of the city.

== Personal ==
Wang is married with two sons.
