= California's 26th State Assembly district =

California legislative district 26

Current assemblymember
Patrick Ahrens; D–Sunnyvale
- Population (2020): 472,660
- Demographics: 27.29% White; 2.11% Black; 17.92% Latino; 47.78% Asian; 0.14% Native American; 0.29% Hawaiian/Pacific Islander; 0.55% other; 3.92% remainder of multiracial
- Registered voters: 210,833
- Registration: 51.46% Democratic; 14.15% Republican; 30.41% No party preference

California's 26th State Assembly district is one of 80 California State Assembly districts. It is currently represented by Democrat Patrick Ahrens of Sunnyvale, California.

== District profile ==
The district is located in Santa Clara County. It encompasses the cities of Cupertino, Sunnyvale, and Santa Clara as well as parts of San Jose, California.

Santa Clara County - 24.36%

- Cupertino
- San Jose – (12.01%)
- Santa Clara
- Sunnyvale

== Election results from statewide races ==
2021 District Boundaries
Year	Office	Results
2022	Governor	Newsom 73.3 — 26.7%
2022	Senator	Padilla 74.3 — 25.7%
2011 District Boundaries
2021	Recall	Yes 59.4 - 40.6%
2020	President	Trump 53.2 – 44.7%
2018	Governor	Cox 57.6 – 42.4%
2018	Senator	De Leon 60.5 – 39.5%
2016	President	Trump 52.9 – 41.5%
2016	Senator	Harris 52.7 – 47.3%
2014	Governor	Kashkari 61.7 – 38.3%
2012	President	Romney 56.7 – 41.2%
2012	Senator	Emken 57.5 – 42.5%

== List of assembly members representing the district ==
Due to redistricting, the 26th district has been moved around different parts of the state. The current iteration resulted from the 2021 redistricting by the California Citizens Redistricting Commission.

Assembly members	Party	Years served	Counties represented	Notes
Vacant		January 8, 1883 – March 24, 1884	Solano	
Douglas G. Barnes	Republican	March 24, 1884 – January 3, 1887	Solano	Elected to finish vacant term.
Frank O'Grady	Democratic	January 3, 1887 – January 7, 1889	Solano	
J. A. Mullaney	Democratic	January 7, 1889 – January 5, 1891	Solano	
Charles Durner	Republican	January 5, 1891 – January 2, 1893	Solano	
J. L. Hutson	Democratic	January 2, 1893 – January 7, 1895	San Joaquin	
T. A. Nelson	Republican	January 7, 1895 – January 4, 1897	San Joaquin	
Charles W. Austin	Republican	January 4, 1897 – February 6, 1898	San Joaquin	Died.
Vacant		February 6, 1898 – January 2, 1899	San Joaquin	
August E. Muenter	Republican	January 2, 1899 – January 1, 1901	San Joaquin	Retired to run for California State Senate.
F. H. Kincaid	Democratic	January 1, 1901 – January 5, 1903	San Joaquin	
Edward N. Baxter	Democratic	January 5, 1903 – January 2, 1905	Mariposa, Tuolumne	
C. V. Jones	Democratic	January 2, 1905 – January 7, 1907	Mariposa, Tuolumne	
Edward N. Baxter	Democratic	January 7, 1907 – January 2, 1911	Mariposa, Tuolumne	
Dan E. Williams	Republican	January 2, 1911 – January 6, 1913	Mariposa, Tuolumne	
William B. Bush	Republican	January 6, 1913 – January 4, 1915	San Francisco	
J. J. Hayes	Republican	January 4, 1915 – January 6, 1919	San Francisco	
William J. Kenney	Republican	January 6, 1919 – January 3, 1921	San Francisco	
Roy Fellom	Republican	January 3, 1921 – January 5, 1925	San Francisco	Retired to run for California State Senate.
Ray Williamson	Republican	January 5, 1925 – January 6, 1941	San Francisco	
Edward M. Gaffney	Democratic	January 6, 1941 – January 5, 1953	San Francisco	
Richard J. Dolwig	Republican	January 5, 1953 – January 7, 1957	San Mateo	Retired to run for California State Senate.
Carl A. Britschgi	Republican	January 7, 1957 – January 4, 1971	San Mateo	Retired to run for California State Senate.
Dixon Arnett	Republican	January 4, 1971 – November 30, 1974	San Mateo	
Carmen Perino	Democratic	December 2, 1974 – November 30, 1980	San Joaquin, Stanislaus	
Adrian C. Fondse	Republican	December 1, 1980 – January 5, 1981	San Joaquin, Stanislaus	
Patrick Johnston	Democratic	January 5, 1981 – January 10, 1991	San Joaquin, Stanislaus	Resigned to take seat in California State Senate.
Vacant		January 10, 1991 – May 16, 1991	San Joaquin	
Dean Andal	Republican	May 16, 1991 – November 30, 1992	San Joaquin	Elected to finish Johnston's term.
Sal Cannella	Democratic	December 7, 1992 – November 30, 1996	Merced, San Joaquin, Stanislaus	Termed out and ran for California State Senate.
Dennis Cardoza	Democratic	December 2, 1996 – November 30, 2002	Merced, San Joaquin, Stanislaus	Retired to run for U.S. House of Representatives.
Greg Aghazarian	Republican	December 2, 2002 – November 30, 2008	San Joaquin, Stanislaus	Retired to run for State Senate.
Bill Berryhill	Republican	December 1, 2008 – November 30, 2012	San Joaquin, Stanislaus	Retired to run for State Senate.
Connie Conway	Republican	December 3, 2012 – November 30, 2014	Inyo, Kern, Tulare	Term limited.
Devon Mathis	Republican	December 1, 2014 – November 30, 2022	Inyo, Kern, Tulare	
Evan Low	Democratic	December 3, 2022 – November 30, 2024	Santa Clara	Retired to run for the U.S. House of Representatives in 2024.
Patrick Ahrens	Democratic	December 2, 2024 – present	Santa Clara	

== Election results (1990–present) ==
=== 2024 ===
2024 California State Assembly 26th district election
Primary election
Party	Candidate	Votes	%
Democratic	Patrick Ahrens	25,057	34.4
Democratic	Tara Sreekrishnan	19,617	26.9
Republican	Sophie Yan Song	15,965	21.9
Democratic	Omar Din	8,779	12.1
Libertarian	Bob Goodwyn	2,172	3.0
No party preference	Ashish Garg	1,221	1.7
Total votes		72,811	100.0
General election
Democratic	Patrick Ahrens	76,807	56.0
Democratic	Tara Sreekrishnan	60,392	44.0
Total votes		137,199	100.0
Democratic hold			

=== 2022 ===
2022 California State Assembly 26th district election
Primary election
Party	Candidate	Votes	%
Democratic	Evan Low (incumbent)	45,916	66.9
Republican	Tim Gorsulowsky	16,289	23.7
Democratic	Long Jiao	6,434	9.4
Total votes		68,639	100.0
General election
Democratic	Evan Low (incumbent)	81,595	74.0
Republican	Tim Gorsulowsky	28,616	26.0
Total votes		110,211	100.0
Democratic hold			

=== 2020 ===
2020 California State Assembly 26th district election
Primary election
Party	Candidate	Votes	%
Republican	Devon Mathis (incumbent)	49,413	61.5
Democratic	Drew Phelps	30,981	38.5
Total votes		80,394	100.0
General election
Republican	Devon Mathis (incumbent)	85,005	54.9
Democratic	Drew Phelps	69,717	45.1
Total votes		154,722	100.0
Republican hold			

=== 2018 ===
2018 California State Assembly 26th district election
Primary election
Party	Candidate	Votes	%
Republican	Devon Mathis (incumbent)	19,081	30.3
Democratic	Jose Sigala	18,794	29.8
Republican	Warren Gubler	17,650	28.0
Republican	Jack Lavers	7,473	11.9
Total votes		62,998	100.0
General election
Republican	Devon Mathis (incumbent)	62,629	57.9
Democratic	Jose Sigala	45,558	42.1
Total votes		108,187	100.0
Republican hold			

=== 2016 ===
2016 California State Assembly 26th district election
Primary election
Party	Candidate	Votes	%
Republican	Devon Mathis (incumbent)	28,563	42.4
Democratic	Ruben Macareno	20,536	30.5
Republican	Rudy Mendoza	18,216	27.1
Total votes		67,315	100.0
General election
Republican	Devon Mathis (incumbent)	76,289	63.3
Democratic	Ruben Macareno	44,205	36.7
Total votes		120,494	100.0
Republican hold			

=== 2014 ===
2014 California State Assembly 26th district election
Primary election
Party	Candidate	Votes	%
Republican	Rudy Mendoza	18,648	40.3
Republican	Devon Mathis	9,497	20.5
Democratic	Carlton Jones	7,943	17.2
Democratic	Ruben Macareno	3,755	8.1
Democratic	Derek A. Thomas	2,872	6.2
Republican	Teresita "Tess" Andres	2,092	4.5
Republican	Esther Barajas	1,473	3.2
Total votes		46,280	100.0
General election
Republican	Devon Mathis	34,683	53.6
Republican	Rudy Mendoza	29,991	46.4
Total votes		64,674	100.0
Republican hold			

=== 2012 ===
2012 California State Assembly 26th district election
Primary election
Party	Candidate	Votes	%
Republican	Connie Conway (incumbent)	34,299	71.8
Democratic	Jonathan Louis Sosa	12,627	28.2
Total votes		46,926	100.0
General election
Republican	Connie Conway (incumbent)	72,061	66.5
Democratic	Jonathan Louis Sosa	36,379	33.5
Total votes		108,440	100.0
Republican hold			

=== 2010 ===
2010 California State Assembly 26th district election
Party	Candidate	Votes	%
Republican	Bill Berryhill (incumbent)	64,625	60.8
Democratic	Tim Weintz, Sr.	41,775	39.2
Total votes		106,400	100.0
Republican hold			

=== 2008 ===
2008 California State Assembly 26th district election
Party	Candidate	Votes	%
Republican	Bill Berryhill	70,620	51.7
Democratic	John Eisenhut	65,940	48.3
Total votes		136,560	100.0
Republican hold			

=== 2006 ===
2006 California State Assembly 26th district election
Party	Candidate	Votes	%
Republican	Greg Aghazarian (incumbent)	54,703	58.4
Democratic	Kenneth Goeken	38,990	41.6
Total votes		93,693	100.0
Republican hold			

=== 2004 ===
2004 California State Assembly 26th district election
Party	Candidate	Votes	%
Republican	Greg Aghazarian (incumbent)	78,381	62.6
Democratic	Tim Weintz, Sr.	46,924	37.4
Total votes		125,305	100.0
Republican hold			

=== 2002 ===
2002 California State Assembly 26th district election
Party	Candidate	Votes	%
Republican	Greg Aghazarian	48,540	57.4
Democratic	Tom Hallinan	36,069	42.6
Total votes		84,609	100.0
Republican gain from Democratic			

=== 2000 ===
2000 California State Assembly 26th district election
Party	Candidate	Votes	%
Democratic	Dennis Cardoza (incumbent)	67,326	65.6
Republican	Marshall Sanchez	35,294	34.4
Total votes		102,620	100.0
Democratic hold			

=== 1998 ===
1998 California State Assembly 26th district election
Party	Candidate	Votes	%
Democratic	Dennis Cardoza (incumbent)	53,059	64.1
Republican	Patty Hollingsworth	27,848	33.6
Libertarian	David Eaton	1,128	1.4
American Independent	Carl Towe	776	0.9
Total votes		82,811	100.0
Democratic hold			

=== 1996 ===
1996 California State Assembly 26th district election
Party	Candidate	Votes	%
Democratic	Dennis Cardoza	46,648	50.05
Republican	Tom Berryhill	46,562	49.95
Total votes		93,210	100.0
Democratic hold			

=== 1994 ===
1994 California State Assembly 26th district election
Party	Candidate	Votes	%
Democratic	Sal Cannella (incumbent)	42,470	53.6
Republican	Greg Thomas	33,003	41.7
Libertarian	Rob Parks	3,748	4.7
Total votes		79,221	100.0
Democratic hold			

=== 1992 ===
1992 California State Assembly 26th district election
Party	Candidate	Votes	%
Democratic	Sal Cannella (incumbent)	54,552	56.8
Republican	Scott Weimer	33,771	35.2
Libertarian	Rob Parks	7,682	8.0
Total votes		96,005	100.0
Democratic gain from Republican			

=== 1991 (special) ===
1991 California State Assembly 26th district special election Vacancy resulting from the resignation of Patrick Johnston
Party	Candidate	Votes	%
Republican	Dean Andal	29,033	56.0
Democratic	Patti Garamendi	21,561	41.6
Libertarian	Debra Klohs Dezarn	1,280	2.5
Total votes		51,874	100.0
Republican gain from Democratic			

=== 1990 ===
1990 California State Assembly 26th district election
Party	Candidate	Votes	%
Democratic	Patrick Johnston (incumbent)	59,632	66.6
Republican	Bradley J. Keaster	27,409	30.6
Libertarian	Debra Klobs	2,471	2.8
Total votes		89,512	100.0
Democratic hold			

== See also ==
- California State Assembly
- California State Assembly districts
- Districts in California
