= Julie Lythcott-Haims =

American educator (born 1967)

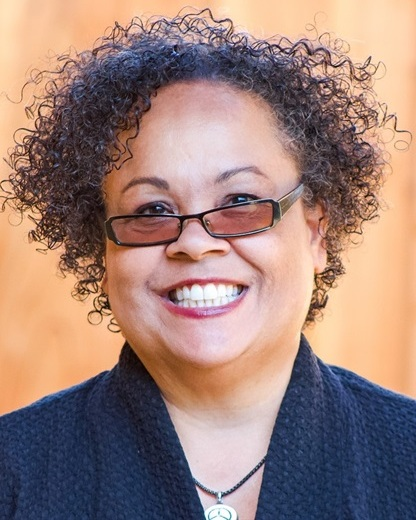
- Lythcott-Haims in 2023

Member of the Palo Alto City Council
- Incumbent
- Assumed office January 9, 2023

Personal details
- Born: 1967 (age 57–58) Lagos, Lagos State, Nigeria
- Political party: Democratic
- Children: 2
- Education: Stanford University (BA); Harvard University (JD); California College of the Arts (MFA)

Julie Lythcott-Haims (born 1967) is an American educator, author, and politician. She has written three non-fiction books: How to Raise an Adult, on parenting; Real American, a memoir; and Your Turn: How to Be an Adult. She served as dean of freshmen and undergraduate advising at Stanford University. She is a member of the Palo Alto city council.

== Early life ==
Lythcott-Haims was born in Lagos, Nigeria in 1967 and moved with her parents to the United States in 1969. Her father, George Ignatius Lythcott, was a pediatrician, a professor at Columbia University, the Edward Jenner Professor of Public Health at UW Madison and served as Assistant Surgeon General under President Jimmy Carter. Her mother, Jean Snookes, is a retired teacher and professor of education at Columbia University Teachers College.

Lythcott-Haims grew up in small towns in New York, Wisconsin, and Virginia. She earned her Bachelor of Arts from Stanford University. She also earned a Juris Doctor degree from Harvard Law School, and a Master of Fine Arts in writing from California College of the Arts.

== Career ==
=== University administrator ===
Lythcott-Haims is the former dean of freshmen and undergraduate advising, and former associate vice provost for undergraduate education at Stanford University. While at Stanford, she was the 2010 winner of the Dinkelspiel Award for contributions to undergraduate education. She held various positions with the university for 14 years until leaving in 2012. At the time, the stated reason for leaving Stanford was her plan to pursue an MFA degree. However, in 2024, Lythcott-Haims confirmed she resigned her position at Stanford in 2012 after an "inappropriate" relationship with an undergraduate student which became public after the former student wrote about it on Autostraddle. According to the former student, Lythcott-Haims left Stanford shortly after the former student's mother anonymously complained to the university. Along with confirming the inappropriate relationship, Lythcott-Haims apologized to the former student, Stanford staff and students, and her own family. She also stepped down from three education-related committees on which she had previously served on the Palo Alto City Council.

While the "inappropriate" relationship was not forbidden at the time, it was "discouraged", and in 2013 Stanford updated its policies to forbid such relationships.

=== Author ===
Lythcott-Haims' 2015 book, How to Raise an Adult, was a New York Times best-seller on the education list. The book cautions parents against micromanaging, or helicopter parenting their children. It argues that this parenting style prevents them from developing independence and resilience as adults and can negatively impact their mental health. A review in the Chicago Tribune said: "Her deep compassion for the young people enduring the endemic stress of [the college admissions] process shines through and her advice about broadening the mindset of applicants — and parents — is solid. But this is the weakest part of a strong book, with the author at times relying more on opinion than fact when it comes to the specifics of college admission, such as testing. Lythcott-Haims' advice is most valuable when it gets down to the brass tacks of how to cultivate a parenting style that produces a resilient, resourceful grownup."

Her 2017 memoir, Real American, describes coming to terms with her racial identity. Her father was a prominent African American physician, her mother white and British, and she was the only non-white student in her high school graduating class. The New York Times review said: “Her feelings metamorphose into palpable anger and resentment as she reaches adulthood, and she finally begins to grasp the perversity of a system that tries to undermine Black Americans from the moment they arrive in the world.” The reviewer said Real American takes the reader on a journey from the author's initial feelings of self-loathing because of her racial makeup to a sense of self-worth. “By allowing us to witness a woman coming to terms with herself, and finding nothing but pride and love there, she offers a blueprint for how others might try to do the same.” Real American won the 2018 PEN Oakland Josephine Miles Literary Award.

Lythcott-Haims' 2021 book, Your Turn: How to Be an Adult, presents her insights and strategies on living a successful adult life for young people entering adulthood. It discusses adult relationships, maintaining physical and mental health, managing money, and other adult responsibilities.

=== Politics ===
In 2008, Lythcott-Haims was chosen as a Barack Obama delegate to the Democratic National Convention from California's 14th congressional district.

In November 2022, Lythcott-Haims was elected to the Palo Alto city council.

In 2023, Lythcott-Haims announced her candidacy for California's 16th congressional district in the 2024 United States House of Representatives elections. In the nonpartisan primary on March 5, 2024, she finished in eighth place, thereby failing to reach the general election.

== Personal life ==
Lythcott-Haims has two adult children and is married to Dan Lythcott-Haims. She lives in Palo Alto, California.

== Bibliography ==
- How to Raise an Adult: Break Free of the Overparenting Trap and Prepare Your Kid for Success. Henry Holt & Co. 2015. ISBN 9781627791779.
- Real American: A Memoir. Henry Holt & Co. 2017. ISBN 9781250137746.
- Your Turn: How to Be an Adult. Henry Holt & Co. 2021. ISBN 9781250137777.
- Writing Memoir - Foreword. Abrams Noterie. 2020. ISBN 9781419741388.
