= 2024 California's 16th congressional district election =

- November 5, 2024
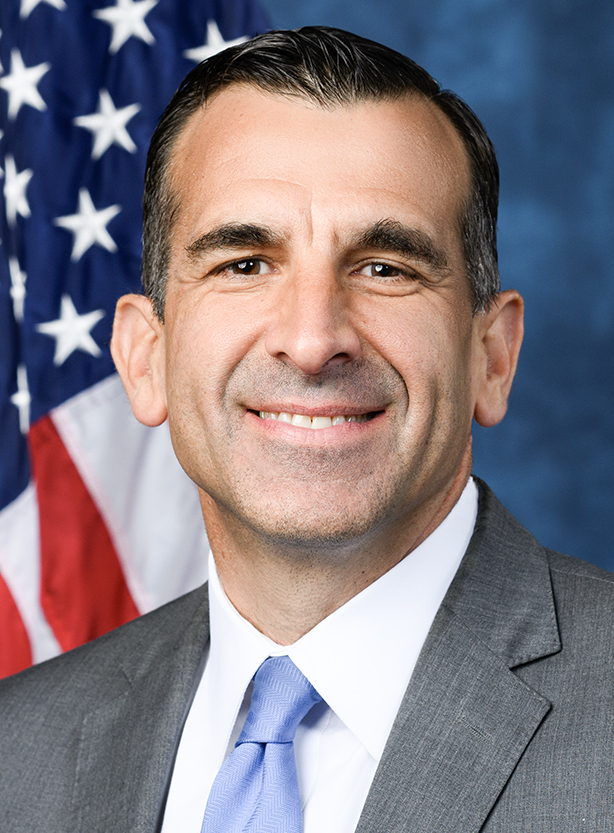

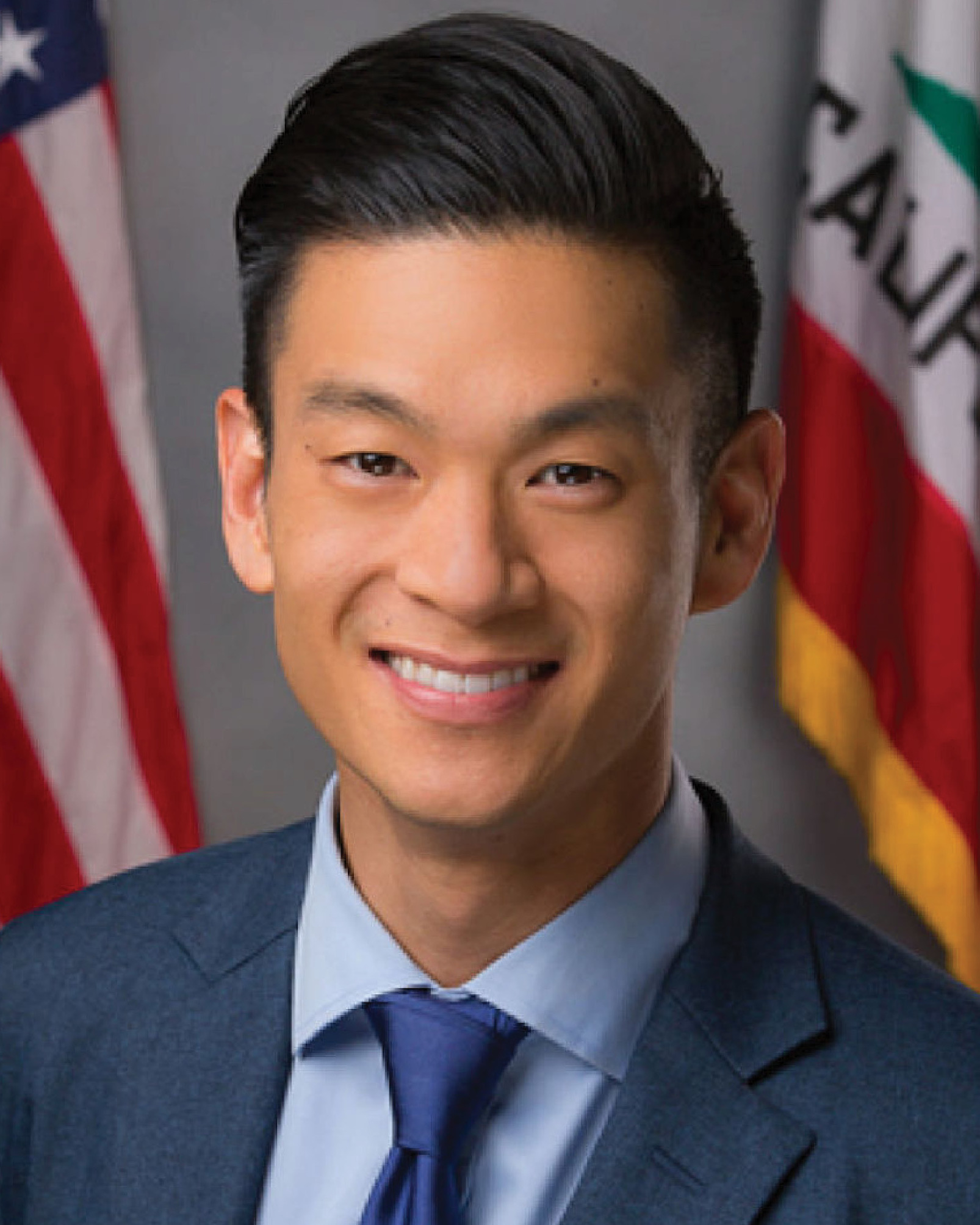
Candidate	Sam Liccardo	Evan Low
Party	Democratic	Democratic
Popular vote	179,583	128,893
Percentage	58.2%	41.8%
- County results Liccardo: 50–60% 60–70%
U.S. Representative before election
Anna Eshoo
Democratic
Elected U.S. Representative
Sam Liccardo
Democratic

The 2024 California's 16th congressional district election was held on November 5, 2024, to elect the United States representative for California's 16th congressional district. The election was held concurrently with elections for the other U.S. House districts in California and the rest of the country, as well as the 2024 U.S. Senate race in California, other elections to the United States Senate, and various state and local elections. The primary election was held on March 5, 2024, concurrently with the Super Tuesday presidential primaries.

The 16th district is an urban/suburban district based in Silicon Valley, including portions of Santa Clara and San Mateo counties, extending from the southwestern San Francisco Bay Area through the Santa Cruz Mountains to the Pacific coast. Its largest cities are San Jose, Mountain View, and Palo Alto. Joe Biden won the district with 75.4% of the vote in the 2020 presidential election, making it a safe Democratic district.

The incumbent prior to the election was Democrat Anna Eshoo, who was re-elected with 57.8% of the vote in 2022 running against another Democrat. She did not seek re-election in 2024. A wide field of 11 candidates filed for the race to succeed her, with 9 Democrats and 2 Republicans joining the race. The primary election was very close, with initial returns showing a heated battle for the two spots in the general election. A week after the primary, media outlets reported that former San Jose mayor Sam Liccardo had taken first place. However, it was unclear which candidate he would face in the general election, as state assemblyman Evan Low and Santa Clara County supervisor Joe Simitian repeatedly traded the second-place position during the vote tabulation process.

By April 3, Low and Simitian had tied with 30,249 votes each in the final account, and both were expected to advance to the general election under a stipulation by California elections code regarding a second-place tie in primary elections. However, a recount was requested by two voters shortly thereafter. The recount request was controversial, with Low's campaign accusing Liccardo of being behind it, an accusation which was vehemently denied by Liccardo's campaign. At the conclusion of the recount on May 1, Low ultimately edged out Simitian by a margin of 5 votes, with Low gaining 12 votes and Simitian 7. As required by federal law, the source of the recount funds was later revealed to be a pro-Liccardo super PAC funded almost entirely by billionaire Michael Bloomberg.

On November 6, the Associated Press called the race for Liccardo. Low conceded the same day.

The primary results marked the second time since California transitioned to a nonpartisan blanket primary system in 2012 in which there was a second-place tie in a primary election and a potential three-candidate general election, the first being the 2016 election for California's 62nd State Assembly district. (Note: In the 2016 California's 62nd State Assembly district election, incumbent Assemblymember Autumn Burke faced off against two write-in candidates who tied with 32 primary votes each.)

== Primary election ==
2024 California's 16th congressional district primary election (post-recount results)
- March 5, 2024
- Turnout: 182,135 votes
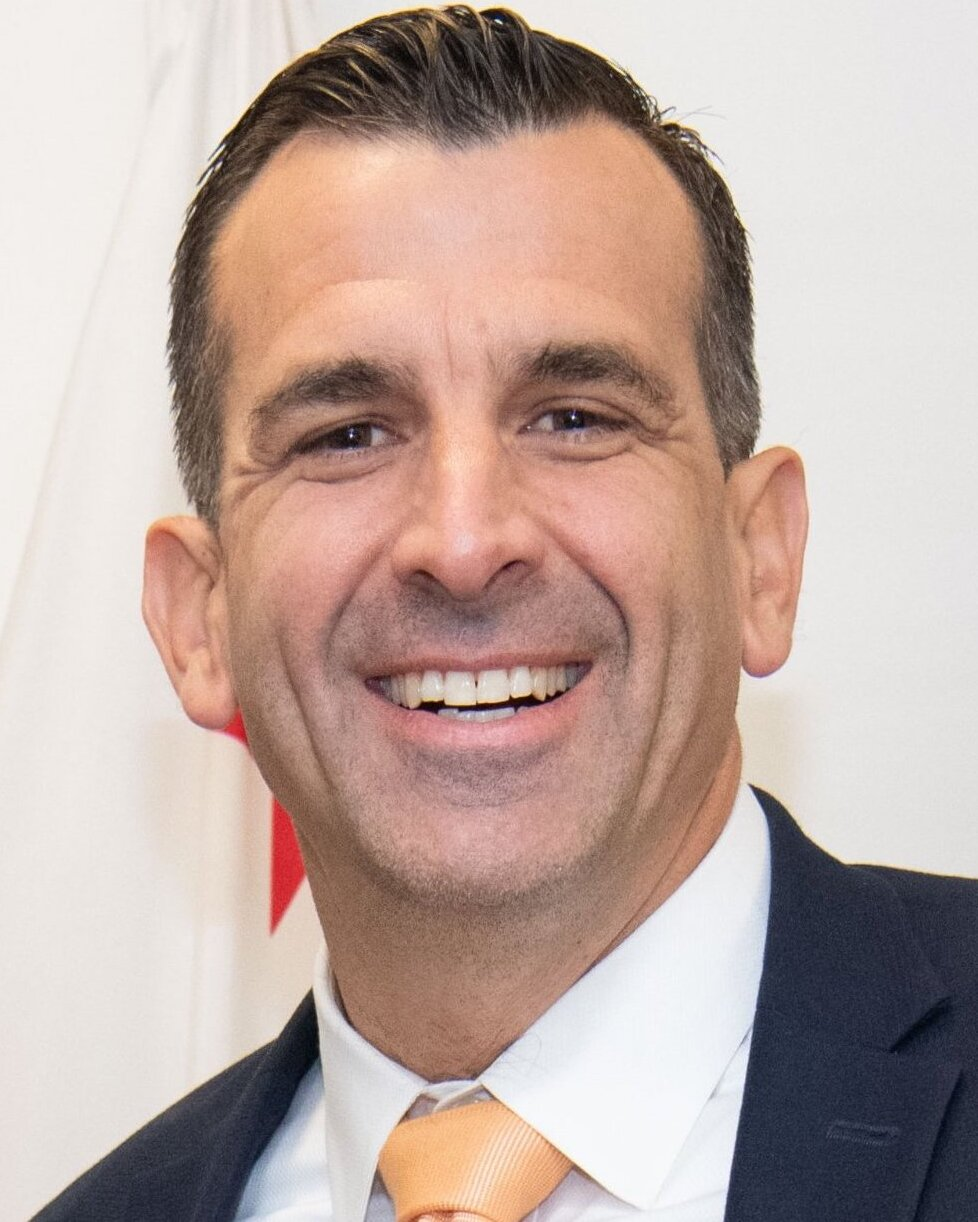

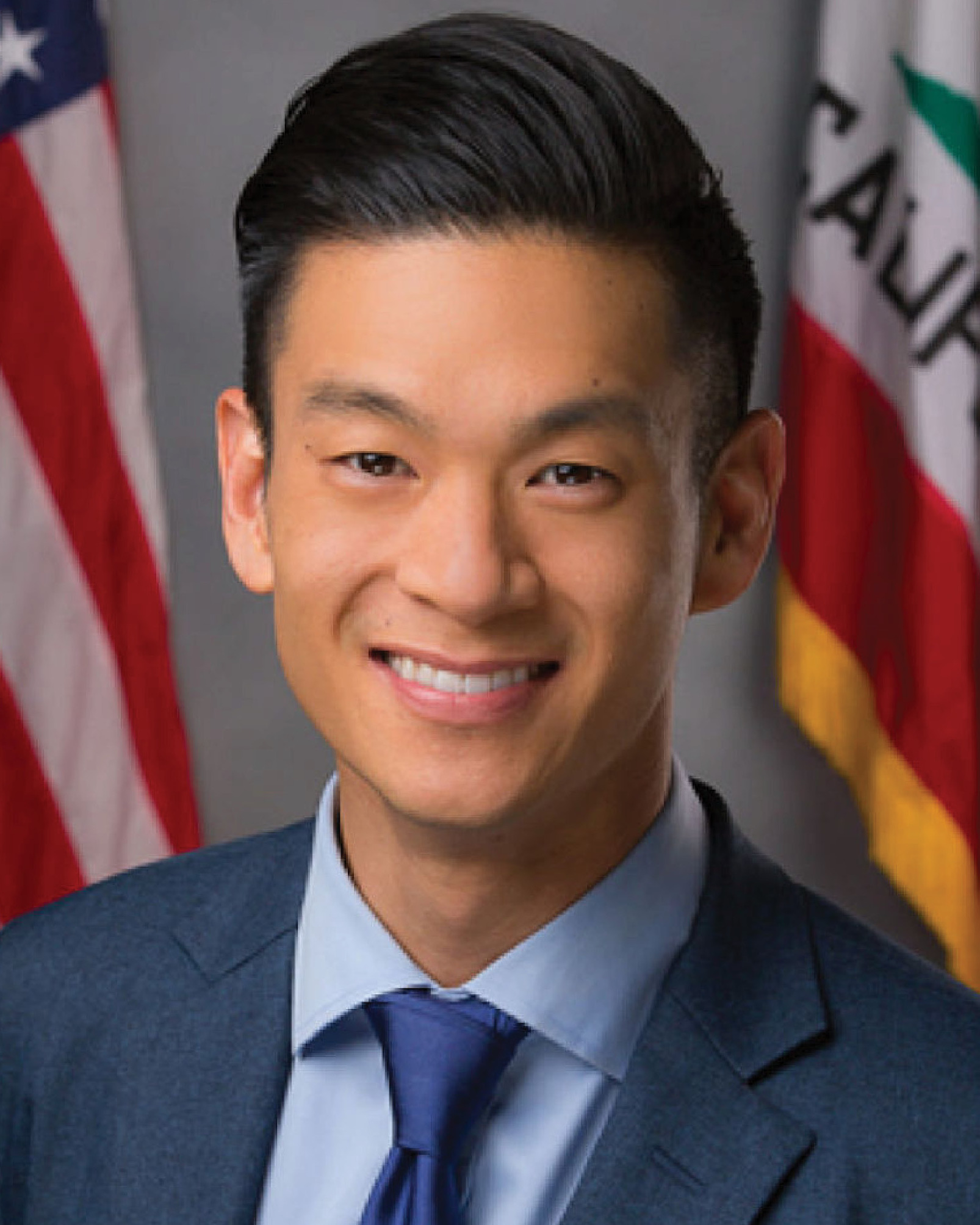

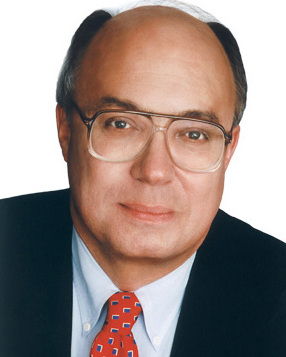

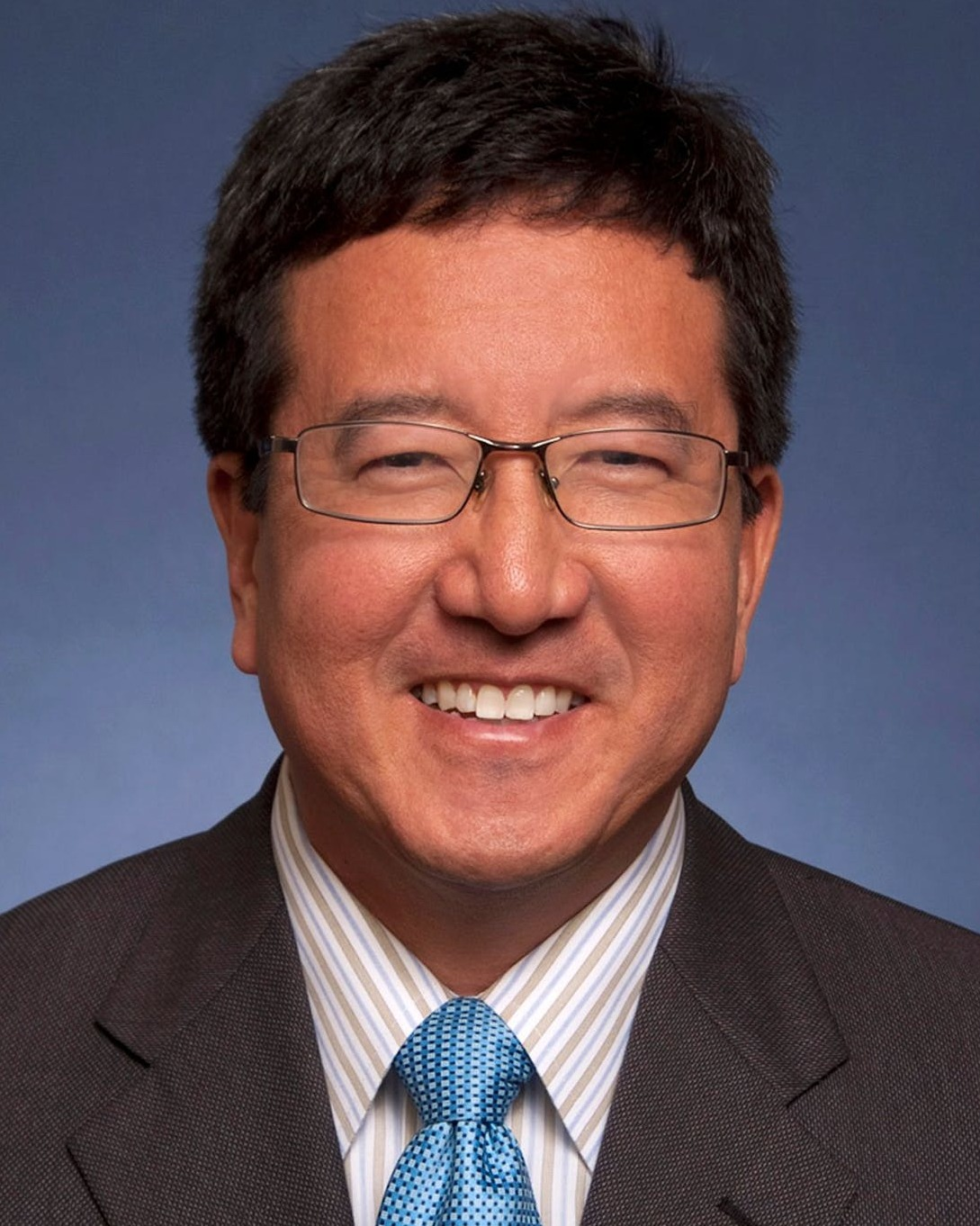

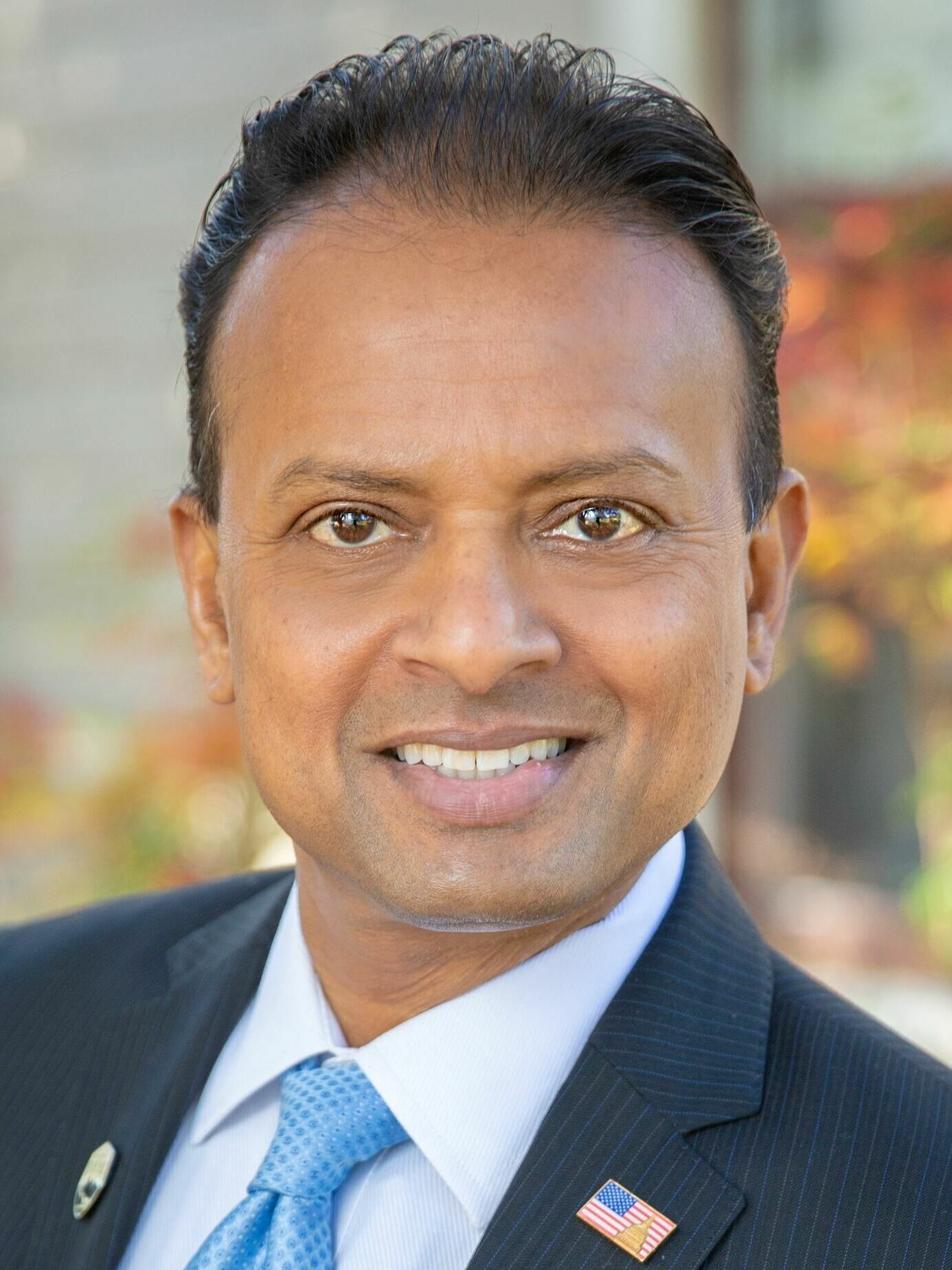

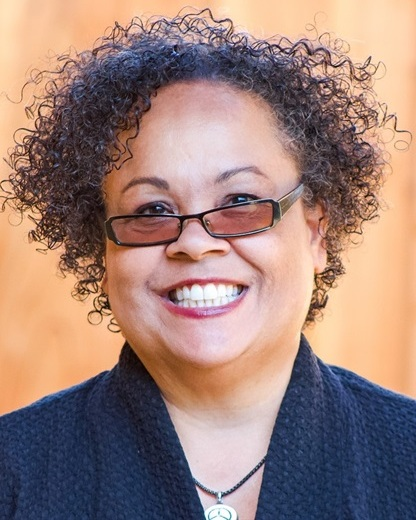
Candidate	Sam Liccardo	Evan Low	Joe Simitian
Party	Democratic	Democratic	Democratic
Popular vote	38,492	30,261	30,256
Percentage	21.1%	16.6%	16.6%
Candidate	Peter Ohtaki	Peter Dixon	Rishi Kumar
Party	Republican	Democratic	Democratic
Popular vote	23,283	14,677	12,383
Percentage	12.8%	8.1%	6.8%
Candidate	Karl Ryan	Julie Lythcott-Haims
Party	Republican	Democratic
Popular vote	11,563	11,386
Percentage	6.3%	6.2%
U.S. Representative before election
Anna Eshoo
Democratic
Elected U.S. Representative
TBD

=== Candidates ===
==== Advanced to general ====
- Sam Liccardo (Democratic), former mayor of San Jose (2015–2023)
- Evan Low (Democratic), state assemblyman (2014–present)

==== Initially advanced to general but eliminated after recount ====
- Joe Simitian (Democratic), Santa Clara County supervisor (1996–2000, 2013–present) and former state senator (2004–2012)

==== Eliminated in primary ====
- Joby Bernstein (Democratic), financial advisor and graduate student
- Peter Dixon (Democratic), cybersecurity executive and former U.S. State Department staffer
- Rishi Kumar (Democratic), former Saratoga city councilor and runner-up for this district (Note: This district was numbered as the 18th district prior to the 2020 redistricting cycle.) in 2020 and 2022
- Julie Lythcott-Haims (Democratic), Palo Alto city councilor
- Ahmed Mostafa (Democratic), attorney
- Peter Ohtaki (Republican), former mayor of Menlo Park and perennial candidate
- Karl Ryan (Republican), businessman
- Greg Tanaka (Democratic), Palo Alto city councilor and candidate for this district in 2022

==== Declined ====
- Josh Becker (Democratic), state senator (2020–present) (ran for re-election)
- Marc Berman (Democratic), state assemblyman (2016–present) (ran for re-election)
- Anna Eshoo (Democratic), incumbent U.S. representative (endorsed Simitian)

=== Fundraising ===
Campaign finance reports as of February 14, 2024
Candidate	Raised	Spent	Cash on hand
Joby Bernstein (D)	$140,836 (Note: $3,000 of this total was self-funded by Bernstein)	$59,832	$81,003
Peter Dixon (D)	$2,792,923 (Note: $1,400,000 of this total was self-funded by Dixon)	$1,894,060	$898,862
Rishi Kumar (D)	$289,503 (Note: $15,000 of this total was self-funded by Kumar)	$186,637	$101,756
Sam Liccardo (D)	$2,206,228	$988,382	$1,217,845
Evan Low (D)	$1,369,551 (Note: $13,661 of this total was self-funded by Low)	$1,024,180	$345,371
Julie Lythcott-Haims (D)	$595,779	$443,035	$152,744
Ahmed Mostafa (D)	$201,773	$127,469	$74,303
Joe Simitian (D)	$951,156	$932,783	$588,744
Greg Tanaka (D)	$15,080 (Note: $13,182 of this total was self-funded by Tanaka)	$13,182	$1,898
Peter Ohtaki (R)	$54,169 (Note: $40,000 of this total was self-funded by Ohtaki)	$32,982	$21,187
Source: Federal Election Commission

=== Endorsements ===
Peter Dixon (D)

U.S. representatives

- Jason Crow, CO-06 (2019–present)
- Don Davis, NC-01 (2023–present)
- Chris Deluzio, PA-17 (2023–present)
- Jared Golden, ME-02 (2019–present)
- Seth Moulton, MA-6 (2015–present)
- Pat Ryan, NY-18 (2022–present)
- Mikie Sherrill, NJ-11 (2019–present)

Organizations

- VoteVets
- With Honor Fund
Sam Liccardo (D)

U.S. representatives

- Linda Sánchez, CA-38 (2003–present)

Local officials

- Matt Mahan, mayor of San Jose (2023–present)

Organizations

- CHC BOLD PAC
- Everytown for Gun Safety

Newspapers

- East Bay Times
- The Mercury News
- San Francisco Chronicle
Julie Lythcott-Haims (D)

U.S. senators

- Cory Booker, U.S. Senator from New Jersey (2013–present)

U.S. representatives

- Lois Frankel, U.S. representative from Florida (2013–present)

Organizations

- EMILY's List
- LPAC
Rishi Kumar (D)

Organizations

- Hindu American PAC
Evan Low (D)

U.S. senators

- Laphonza Butler, U.S. senator from California (2023–present)

Statewide officials

- Eleni Kounalakis, lieutenant governor of California (2019–present)
- Ricardo Lara, California Insurance Commissioner (2019–present)
- Fiona Ma, California State Treasurer (2019–present)

U.S. representatives

- Becca Balint, VT-AL (2023–present)
- Judy Chu, CA-28 (2009–present)
- Jimmy Gomez, CA-34 (2017–present)
- Pramila Jayapal, WA-07 (2017–present)
- Ro Khanna, CA-17 (2017–present)
- Mark Pocan, WI-02 (2013–present)
- Jamie Raskin, MD-08 (2017–present)
- Mark Takano, CA-39 (2013–present)
- Jill Tokuda, HI-02 (2023–present)
- Ritchie Torres, NY-15 (2021–present)

State legislators

- Rich Gordon, state assemblymember from the 24th district (2010–2016)

County officials

- Ken Yeager, former Santa Clara County supervisor (2006–2018)

Judges

- LaDoris Cordell, former California Superior Court judge

Organizations

- AAPI Victory Fund
- ASPIRE PAC
- Congressional Progressive Caucus PAC
- Equality California
- Equality PAC
- LGBTQ+ Victory Fund

Labor unions

- Association of Flight Attendants
- California Federation of Labor
- California Professional Firefighters
- IBEW Locals 617 and 1245
- National Nurses United
- South Bay Labor Council

Newspapers

- Bay Area Reporter
Ahmed Mostafa (D)

Organizations

- Emgage PAC
Peter Ohtaki (R)

Local officials

- Carl DeMaio, former San Diego city councilor (2008–2012)

Organizations

- California College Republicans
Karl Ryan (R)

Political parties

- American Independent Party
Joe Simitian (D)

U.S. representatives

- Anna Eshoo, CA-16 (1993–present)

Organizations

- Clean Water Action
- Sierra Club

Labor unions

- California Teachers Association
- National Education Association
- United Farm Workers

Newspapers

- Palo Alto Daily Post

=== Polling ===
Poll source	Date(s) administered	Sample size (Note: Key: A – all adults RV – registered voters LV – likely voters V – unclear)	Margin of error	Rishi Kumar (D)	Sam Liccardo (D)	Evan Low (D)	Julie Lythcott- Haims (D)	Peter Ohtaki (R)	Karl Ryan (R)	Joe Simitian (D)	Other	Undecided
Problosky Research (Note: Poll commissioned by San Jose Spotlight)	January 21–28, 2024	400 (LV)	± 5%	7.5%	16%	7.3%	4%	2.5%	6.5%	13.3%	9.4% (Note: Peter Dixon (D) with 4.3%; Ahmed Mostafa (D) and Greg Tanaka (D) each with 2.3%; Joby Bernstein with 0.5%)	33.8%
RMG Research (Note: Poll commissioned by U.S. Term Limits. Evan Low has signed the group's term-limits pledge.)	January 3–4, 2024	426 (LV)	± 4.7	6%	13%	11%	5%	2%	—	12%	2% (Note: Joby Bernstein (D), Peter Dixon (D), Ahmed Mostafa (D), and Greg Tanaka (D) with 0%; "Other" with 2%)	46%
Public Policy Polling (D) (Note: Poll commissioned by supporters of Sam Liccardo)	November 2023	400 (LV)	?	7%	16%	5%	—	6%	9%	12%	11% (Note: Sally Lieber (D) with 7%; Josh Becker (D) with 4%; Joby Bernstein (D) with 1%)	33%

=== Initial certified results ===
2024 California's 16th congressional district primary (results certified on April 4, 2024)
Party	Candidate	Votes	%
Democratic	Sam Liccardo	38,489	21.1
Democratic	Evan Low	30,249	16.6
Democratic	Joe Simitian	30,249	16.6
Republican	Peter Ohtaki	23,275	12.8
Democratic	Peter Dixon	14,673	8.1
Democratic	Rishi Kumar	12,377	6.8
Republican	Karl Ryan	11,557	6.3
Democratic	Julie Lythcott-Haims	11,383	6.2
Democratic	Ahmed Mostafa	5,811	3.2
Democratic	Greg Tanaka	2,421	1.3
Democratic	Joby Bernstein	1,651	0.9
Total votes		182,135	100.0

=== Recount and involvement of Liccardo super PACs ===
Santa Clara and San Mateo counties certified the primary results on April 4. The Los Angeles Times pointed out that Low and Simitian had no incentive to request a recount, which could potentially lock them out of the general election. Both campaigns released statements indicating that they intend to compete in the general election. However, local media reported that a poll had been sent to voters testing a three-way race as well as two-way races between Liccardo and each of his opponents, leading to speculation that Liccardo's campaign would ask for a recount. On April 9, officials in Santa Clara and San Mateo counties confirmed that two residents of the district had requested a recount: Jonathan Padilla, who was finance director on Liccardo's 2014 mayoral campaign and donated $1,000 to his 2024 congressional campaign, and Pacifica resident Dan Stegink. Stegink later withdrew his request.

Low's campaign alleged that Liccardo was behind the requests, which they called "a page right out of Trump's political playbook using dirty tricks to attack democracy and subvert the will of the voters." Liccardo's campaign denied responsibility, though they maintained the recount was necessary, saying "every vote should be counted." Padilla, a "longtime Silicon Valley political insider," did not answer questions from local media about the source of the funds for the costly recount. Eshoo, who endorsed Simitian, called for transparency in the recount process. In his recount request, Padilla wrote that he was "not coordinating or communicating with any candidate or candidates' agents" and made "this request on behalf of Evan Low." However, Low's campaign reaffirmed that he did not support the recount and called Padilla's statement "disingenuous."

Padilla submitted a $12,000 deposit for the recount on April 12. He opted for a machine recount, in which ballots are re-screened by a machine, rather than a much more expensive manual recount, in which volunteers would count each ballot by hand. Election officials estimated the cost of the machine recount at around $80,000, whereas a manual recount could have cost upwards of $400,000. The recount began on April 15.

According to reporting by KNTV, the recount is being funded by $12,000 checks from the newly-formed super PAC "Count the Vote" signed by James Sutton, an attorney who had previously represented Liccardo. On April 19, Santa Clara County Government Attorneys Association president Max Zarzana filed a complaint with the Federal Election Commission, alleging that the Liccardo campaign concocted a "secret scheme to illegally coordinate with a newly-formed dark money Super PAC to do his CD-16 recount bidding" and noted Liccardo's past connections with those involved in requesting the recount. Zarzana also highlighted Liccardo's history of "backroom deals" including violations of the California Public Records Act for which he was previously fined $500,000.

The results of the recount were finalized on May 1, with Low advancing to the general election and Simitian eliminated by a 5-vote margin, 30,261 to 30,256. On May 2, the Liccardo campaign shared internal poll results showing him with a 10-point lead over Low in a two-way race, compared with just a 5-point lead in a three-way race. The poll was completed on April 8, the day before the recount was requested.

On May 20, Neighbors for Results, the super PAC supporting Liccardo almost entirely funded by billionaire Michael Bloomberg, disclosed that it paid $102,000 to the group which funded the recount, Count the Vote PAC. The attorney who represented Padilla in his recount request, Matthew Alvarez, is also listed as the treasurer of both super PACs in question. In 2018, Bloomberg Philanthropies previously selected San Jose, which Liccardo was then mayor of, for funding and resources from the American Cities Climate Challenge, and two years later Liccardo then endorsed and served as a state co-chair on Bloomberg's presidential campaign. After this information was publicized, a second Bay Area attorney, Brian O'Grady, filed a FEC complaint claiming that the PACs violated federal campaign finance laws in order to hide their connection with Liccardo's campaign.

=== Post-recount results ===
2024 California's 16th congressional district primary
Party	Candidate	Votes	%	±%
Democratic	Sam Liccardo	38,492	21.1	−0.005
Democratic	Evan Low	30,261	16.6	+0.002
Democratic	Joe Simitian	30,256	16.6	−0.001
Republican	Peter Ohtaki	23,283	12.8	+0.001
Democratic	Peter Dixon	14,677	8.1	−0.000
Democratic	Rishi Kumar	12,383	6.8	+0.001
Republican	Karl Ryan	11,563	6.3	+0.001
Democratic	Julie Lythcott-Haims	11,386	6.2	−0.000
Democratic	Ahmed Mostafa	5,814	3.2	+0.001
Democratic	Greg Tanaka	2,421	1.3	−0.000
Democratic	Joby Bernstein	1,652	0.9	+0.000
Total votes		182,188	100.0	

=== Federal Election Commission complaint against Low campaign ===
In October 2024, good-government group Defend the Vote filed an FEC complaint against Low, alleging that he had spent nearly $600,000 from his state campaign account on ads that were distributed across the congressional district. Defend the Vote argued that the move violated federal campaign finance laws, as state campaigns can accept higher individual contributions than federal campaigns, and can receive political action committee and corporation donations directly.

In wake of the expenditures, an attorney for Liccardo sent cease and desist letters to five TV stations that broadcast the ads. The Mercury News Editorial Board reaffirmed their endorsement of Liccardo, criticizing Low for "putting political self-interest ahead of campaign integrity."

== General election ==
=== Predictions ===
Source	Ranking	As of
The Cook Political Report	Solid D	February 2, 2023
Inside Elections	Solid D	March 10, 2023
Sabato's Crystal Ball	Safe D	February 23, 2023
Elections Daily	Safe D	February 5, 2024
CNalysis	Solid D	November 16, 2023

=== Post-primary endorsements ===
Sam Liccardo (D)

Organizations

- NewDem Action Fund
Evan Low (D)

Statewide officials

- Gavin Newsom, governor of California (2019–present)

Organizations

- California Democratic Party

=== Debates ===
2024 California's 16th congressional district election debate
No.	Date	Host	Moderators	Link	Democratic	Democratic
Key: P Participant A Absent N Not invited I Invited W Withdrawn						
Key: P Participant A Absent N Not invited I Invited W Withdrawn					Liccardo	Low
1	October 11, 2024	KNTV; KSTS; KQED	Raj Mathai	YouTube	P	P

=== Polling ===
Poll source	Date(s) administered	Sample size	Margin of error	Sam Liccardo (D)	Evan Low (D)	Undecided
USC/CSU (Note: Poll sponsored by Neighbors for Results PAC, which supports Sam Liccardo)	September 14–21, 2024	544 (LV)	± 4.2%	44%	27%	30% (Note: "Won't vote" with 7%)
EMC Research (Note: Poll sponsored by Equality California, which supports Low's campaign)	September 5–10, 2024	600 (LV)	± 4.0%	48%	45%	7%
Rodriguez Gudelunas Strategies (D)	September 4–7, 2024	600 (LV)	± 4.0%	42%	28%	30%
Tulchin Research (D) (Note: Poll sponsored by Low's campaign)	July 23–29, 2024	500 (LV)	± 4.38%	30%	29%	41%
Lake Research Partners (D) (Note: Poll sponsored by Liccardo's campaign)	June 24–27, 2024	600 (LV)	–	39%	28%	33%
Lake Research Partners (D)	April 5–8, 2024	400 (LV)	± 4.9%	36%	26%	38%

Hypothetical polling

Poll source	Date(s) administered	Sample size	Margin of error	Sam Liccardo (D)	Evan Low (D)	Joe Simitian (D)	Undecided
Lake Research Partners (D)	April 5–8, 2024	400 (LV)	± 4.9%	26%	21%	20%	24%

=== Results ===
2024 California's 16th congressional district general election
Party	Candidate	Votes	%
Democratic	Sam Liccardo	179,583	58.2%
Democratic	Evan Low	128,893	41.8%
Total votes		308,476	100.0%
Democratic hold			

==== By county ====
County	Sam Liccardo Democratic		Evan Low Democratic		Margin		Total votes cast
County	#	%	#	%	#	%	Total votes cast
San Mateo (part)	36,540	62.27%	22,142	37.73%	14,398	24.54%	58,682
Santa Clara (part)	143,043	57.26%	106,751	42.74%	36,292	14.53%	249,794
Totals	179,583	58.22%	128,893	41.78%	50,690	16.43%	308,476

== Notes ==
Partisan clients
