= 2008 United States House of Representatives elections =

House elections for the 111th U.S. Congress

- November 4, 2008

All 435 seats in the United States House of Representatives (Note: As well as the 6 non-voting delegates.) 218 seats needed for a majority
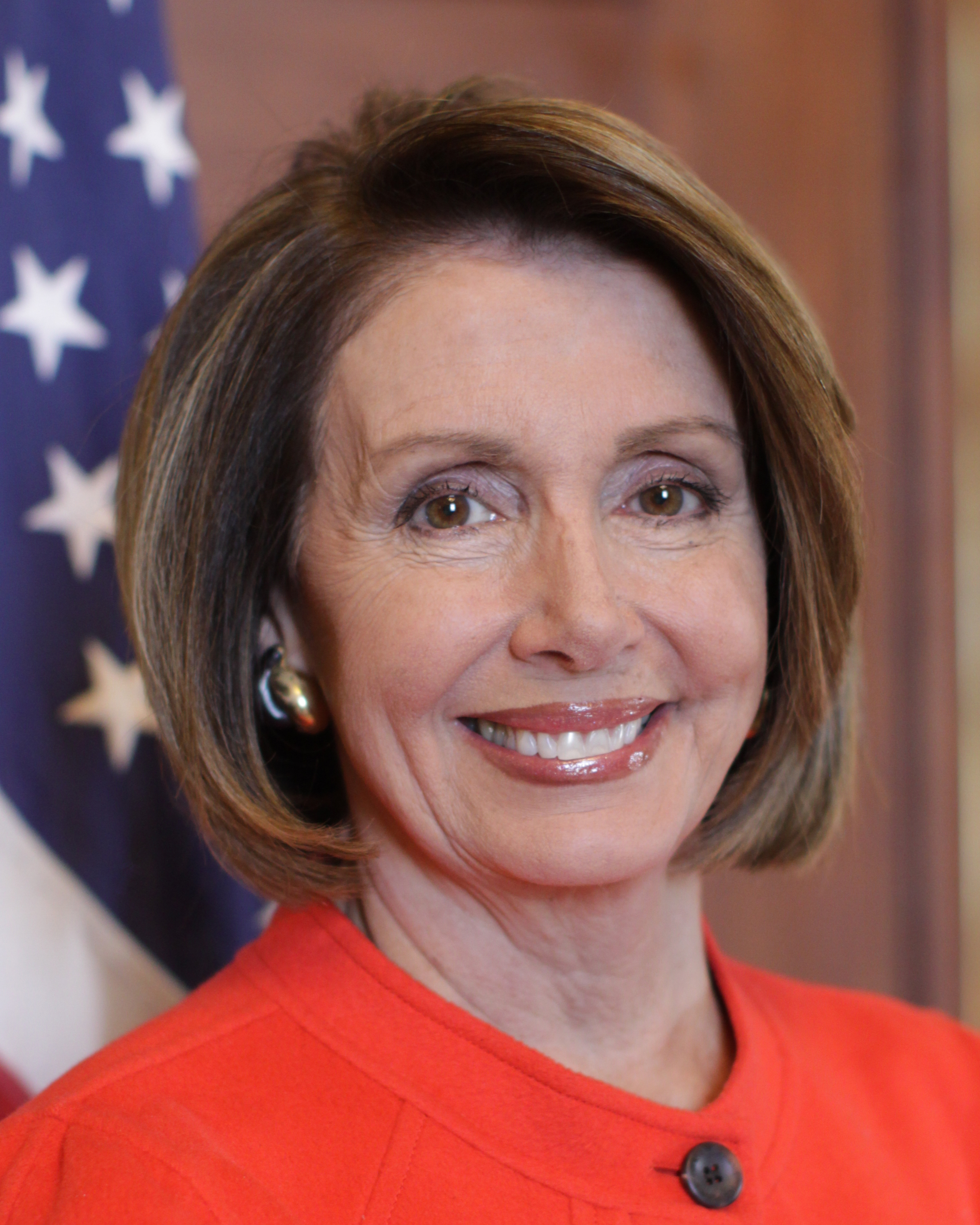

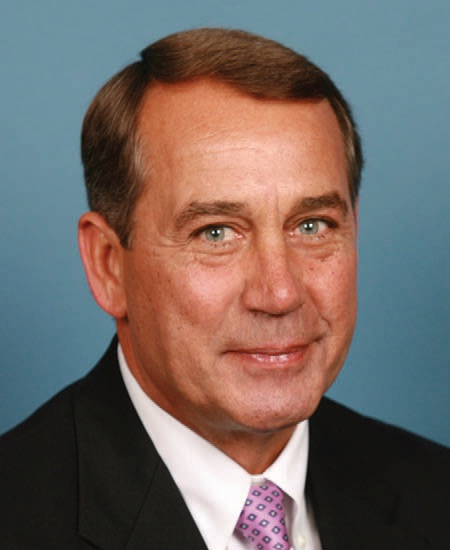
	Majority party	Minority party
Leader	Nancy Pelosi	John Boehner
Party	Democratic	Republican
Leader since	January 3, 2003	January 3, 2007
Leader's seat	California 8th	Ohio 8th
Last election	233 seats, 52.3%	202 seats, 44.3%
Seats before	236	199
Seats won	257	178
Seat change	▲21	▼21
Popular vote	64,888,090	51,952,981
Percentage	52.9%	42.4%
Swing	▲0.6pp	▼1.9pp
- Results: Democratic hold Democratic gain Republican hold Republican gain
Speaker before election
Nancy Pelosi
Democratic
Elected Speaker
Nancy Pelosi
Democratic

The 2008 United States House of Representatives elections were held on November 4, 2008, to elect members to the United States House of Representatives to serve in the 111th United States Congress from January 3, 2009, until January 3, 2011. It coincided with the election of Barack Obama as president. All 435 voting seats, as well as all six non-voting seats, were up for election. The Democratic Party, which won a majority of seats in the 2006 election, expanded its control in 2008.

The Republican Party, hoping to regain the majority it lost in the 2006 election or at least expand its congressional membership, lost additional seats. With one exception (Louisiana's 2nd district), the only seats to switch from Democratic to Republican had been Republican-held prior to the 2006 elections. Republicans gained five Democratic seats total, while losing 26 of their own, giving the Democrats a net gain of 21 seats, effectively erasing all gains made by the GOP since 1994. In addition, with the defeat of Republican congressman Chris Shays in Connecticut's 4th district, this became the first time since the 1850s that no House Republican represented the New England region.

The 10.6% popular vote advantage by the Democrats was the largest by either party since 1982. Turnout increased due to the concurrent presidential election.

As of 2026, this remains the last election in which Democrats won House seats in Idaho, North Dakota, and South Dakota; and the last election in which Democrats won a majority of seats in Arkansas, Indiana, Mississippi, Tennessee, West Virginia, and Wisconsin. It is also the last time Republicans won the Delaware seat.

== Results summary ==
=== Federal ===
↓
257	178
Democratic	Republican

Party	Voting members				Non-voting members			
Party	Votes	Percentage	Seats	+/−	Votes	Percentage	Seats	+/−
Democratic^{[A]}	64,888,090	52.93%	257	▲21	1,952,133	94.3%	4	▲1
Republican	51,952,981	42.38%	178	▼21	1,919	0.1%	0	▼1
Libertarian	1,083,096	0.88%	0	Steady	—	—	0	Steady
Independent^{[B]}	729,798	0.60%	0	Steady	21,574	1.0%	2	▲1
Green	570,780	0.47%	0	Steady	14,386	0.7%	0	Steady
Constitution	136,021	0.11%	0	Steady	—	—	0	Steady
Independence	300,108	0.24%	0	Steady	—	—	0	Steady
Working Families	294,299	0.24%	0	Steady	—	—	0	Steady
Others	2,631,120	2.15%						
Totals	122,586,293	100.0%	435	—	2,069,306	100.0%	6	▲1
Voter turnout								

Popular vote
Democratic	52.93%
Republican	42.38%
Libertarian	0.88%
Green	0.47%
Others	3.34%

House seats
Democratic	59.08%
Republican	40.92%

=== Per state ===
State	Total seats	Democratic		Republican	
State	Total seats	Seats	Change	Seats	Change
Alabama	7	3	▲1	4	▼1
Alaska	1	0	Steady	1	Steady
Arizona	8	5	▲1	3	▼1
Arkansas	4	3	Steady	1	Steady
California	53	34	Steady	19	Steady
Colorado	7	5	▲1	2	▼1
Connecticut	5	5	▲1	0	▼1
Delaware	1	0	Steady	1	Steady
Florida	25	10	▲1	15	▼1
Georgia	13	6	Steady	7	Steady
Hawaii	2	2	Steady	0	Steady
Idaho	2	1	▲1	1	▼1
Illinois	19	12	▲1	7	▼1
Indiana	9	5	Steady	4	Steady
Iowa	5	3	Steady	2	Steady
Kansas	4	1	▼1	3	▲1
Kentucky	6	2	Steady	4	Steady
Louisiana	7	1	▼2	6	▲2
Maine	2	2	Steady	0	Steady
Maryland	8	7	▲1	1	▼1
Massachusetts	10	10	Steady	0	Steady
Michigan	15	8	▲2	7	▼2
Minnesota	8	5	Steady	3	Steady
Mississippi	4	3	Steady	1	Steady
Missouri	9	4	Steady	5	Steady
Montana	1	0	Steady	1	Steady
Nebraska	3	0	Steady	3	Steady
Nevada	3	2	▲1	1	▼1
New Hampshire	2	2	Steady	0	Steady
New Jersey	13	8	▲1	5	▼1
New Mexico	3	3	▲2	0	▼2
New York	29	26	▲3	3	▼3
North Carolina	13	8	▲1	5	▼1
North Dakota	1	1	Steady	0	Steady
Ohio	18	10	▲3	8	▼3
Oklahoma	5	1	Steady	4	Steady
Oregon	5	4	Steady	1	Steady
Pennsylvania	19	12	▲1	7	▼1
Rhode Island	2	2	Steady	0	Steady
South Carolina	6	2	Steady	4	Steady
South Dakota	1	1	Steady	0	Steady
Tennessee	9	5	Steady	4	Steady
Texas	32	12	▼1	20	▲1
Utah	3	1	Steady	2	Steady
Vermont	1	1	Steady	0	Steady
Virginia	11	6	▲3	5	▼3
Washington	9	6	Steady	3	Steady
West Virginia	3	2	Steady	1	Steady
Wisconsin	8	5	Steady	3	Steady
Wyoming	1	0	Steady	1	Steady
Total	435	257	▲21	178	▼21

^{A} The number of non-voting members also includes the non-voting member-elect from Puerto Rico, Pedro Pierluisi, who is a member of the New Progressive Party of Puerto Rico, but caucused with the Democrats. The New Progressive Party is affiliated with both the Democratic and Republican Parties and the last representative from Puerto Rico, Luis Fortuño, caucused with the Republicans. The vote total for the non-voting members also includes the Popular Democratic Party of Puerto Rico, which has ties to the Democratic Party.
^{B} Both non-voting independents, American Samoa's representative Eni Faleomavaega and the Northern Mariana Islands' representative Gregorio Sablan, caucused with the Democrats. In America Samoa all elections are non-partisan. In the Northern Mariana Islands, Sablan appeared on the ballot as an independent.

=== Maps ===
House seats by party holding majority in state

Popular vote by states

House results shaded by margin

Net changes to U.S. House seats after the 2008 elections

Seating Chart

== Retiring incumbents ==
Retiring incumbents by district Democratic incumbent ran Democratic incumbent retired Republican incumbent ran Republican incumbent retired or lost renomination Vacant district

Thirty-three incumbents voluntarily retired.

=== Democratic incumbents ===
All seven seats held by retiring Democrats were won by Democrats.

1. Alabama 5: Bud Cramer retired.
2. California 12: Tom Lantos retired, and later died on February 11, 2008.
3. Colorado 2: Mark Udall retired to run for the U.S. Senate.
4. Maine 1: Tom Allen retired to run for the U.S. Senate.
5. New Mexico 3: Tom Udall retired to run for the U.S. Senate.
6. New York 21: Michael McNulty retired.
7. Oregon 5: Darlene Hooley retired.

=== Republican incumbents ===
Twenty-seven Republicans retired. Thirteen of their seats were then won by Democrats (see Open seat gains, below).

1. Alabama 2: Terry Everett retired.
2. Arizona 1: Rick Renzi retired.
3. California 4: John Doolittle retired.
4. California 52: Duncan Hunter retired to run for President.
5. Colorado 6: Tom Tancredo retired to run for President.
6. Florida 15: Dave Weldon retired.
7. Illinois 11: Jerry Weller retired.
8. Illinois 18: Ray LaHood retired. On December 19, 2008, President-elect Barack Obama announced his intention to nominate LaHood to serve as the next Secretary of Transportation. He was later confirmed.
9. Kentucky 2: Ron Lewis retired.
10. Louisiana 4: Jim McCrery retired.
11. Minnesota 3: Jim Ramstad retired.
12. Mississippi 3: Chip Pickering retired.
13. Missouri 9: Kenny Hulshof retired to run for governor of Missouri.
14. New Jersey 3: Jim Saxton retired.
15. New Jersey 7: Mike Ferguson retired.
16. New Mexico 1: Heather Wilson retired to run for the U.S. Senate.
17. New Mexico 2: Steve Pearce retired to run for the U.S. Senate.
18. New York 13: Vito Fossella retired.
19. New York 25: Jim Walsh retired.
20. New York 26: Tom Reynolds retired.
21. Ohio 7: Dave Hobson retired.
22. Ohio 15: Deborah Pryce retired.
23. Ohio 16: Ralph Regula retired.
24. Pennsylvania 5: John Peterson retired.
25. Puerto Rico's at-large congressional district: Luis Fortuño retired to run for governor of Puerto Rico.
26. Virginia 11: Tom Davis retired.
27. Wyoming's at-large congressional district: Barbara Cubin retired.

== Defeated incumbents ==
=== Incumbents defeated in primary election ===
One Republican lost in a primary and the seat was eventually won by a Democrat. One Democrat lost the primary as did two Republicans. The three primary winners, however, managed to retain the seat for the same party.

1. Maryland 1: Wayne Gilchrest (R), whose seat was later won by a Democrat
2. Maryland 4: Albert Wynn (D), who subsequently resigned May 31, 2008
3. Utah 3: Chris Cannon (R)
4. Tennessee 1: David Davis (R)

=== Incumbents defeated in general election ===
Fourteen Republicans and five Democrats lost their general elections, thereby losing their seats to the other party.

1. Colorado 4: Marilyn Musgrave (R)
2. Connecticut 4: Christopher Shays (R)
3. Florida 8: Ric Keller (R)
4. Florida 16: Tim Mahoney (D)
5. Florida 24: Tom Feeney (R)
6. Idaho 1: Bill Sali (R)
7. Kansas 2: Nancy Boyda (D)
8. Louisiana 2: Bill Jefferson (D)
9. Louisiana 6: Don Cazayoux (D)
10. Michigan 7: Tim Walberg (R)
11. Michigan 9: Joe Knollenberg (R)
12. Nevada 3: Jon Porter (R)
13. New York 29: Randy Kuhl (R)
14. North Carolina 8: Robin Hayes (R)
15. Ohio 1: Steve Chabot (R)
16. Pennsylvania 3: Phil English (R)
17. Texas 22: Nick Lampson (D)
18. Virginia 2: Thelma Drake (R)
19. Virginia 5: Virgil Goode (R)

== Open seat gains ==
Twelve seats (and one delegate's seat) held by retiring Republicans were won by Democrats. No Democratic retirements were picked up by Republicans.

1. Alabama 2: Democratic gain.
2. Arizona 1: Democratic gain.
3. Illinois 11: Democratic gain.
4. Maryland 1: Democratic gain.
5. New Jersey 3: Democratic gain.
6. New Mexico 1: Democratic gain.
7. New Mexico 2: Democratic gain.
8. New York 13: Democratic gain.
9. New York 25: Democratic gain.
10. Ohio 15: Democratic gain.
11. Ohio 16: Democratic gain.
12. Puerto Rico at-large: NPP/Democratic gain.
13. Virginia 11: Democratic gain.

== Closest races ==
Fifty-two races were decided by 10% or lower.

District	Winner	Margin
Virginia 5th	Democratic (flip)	0.23%
Louisiana 4th	Republican	0.38%
California 4th	Republican	0.49%
Alabama 2nd	Democratic (flip)	0.62%
Ohio 15th	Democratic (flip)	0.76%
Maryland 1st	Democratic (flip)	0.79%
Idaho 1st	Democratic (flip)	1.21%
New York 29th	Democratic (flip)	1.93%
Michigan 7th	Democratic (flip)	2.31%
California 44th	Republican	2.38%
Pennsylvania 3rd	Democratic (flip)	2.47%
Missouri 9th	Republican	2.51%
Louisiana 2nd	Republican (flip)	2.71%
Minnesota 6th	Republican	2.97%
Pennsylvania 11th	Democratic	3.25%
Alabama 5th	Democratic	3.58%
Nebraska 2nd	Republican	3.85%
New York 24th	Democratic	3.94%
Connecticut 4th	Democratic (flip)	3.97%
Florida 8th	Democratic (flip)	4.02%
South Carolina 1st	Republican	4.04%
New Jersey 3rd	Democratic (flip)	4.15%
Pennsylvania 6th	Republican	4.20%
Kansas 2nd	Republican (flip)	4.40%
Ohio 1st	Democratic (flip)	4.94%
Virginia 2nd	Democratic (flip)	4.94%
California 50th	Republican	5.06%
Illinois 10th	Republican	5.12%
Nevada 3rd	Democratic (flip)	5.14%
Kentucky 2nd	Republican	5.15%
Alaska at-large	Republican	5.17%
California 3rd	Republican	5.56%
Washington 8th	Republican	5.57%
New Hampshire 1st	Democratic	5.89%
Michigan 11th	Republican	6.04%
Florida 25th	Republican	6.11%
Alabama 3rd	Republican	6.91%
Texas 22nd	Republican (flip)	6.91%
Ohio 2nd	Republican	7.37%
Texas 17th	Democratic	7.48%
South Carolina 2nd	Republican	7.56%
Minnesota 3rd	Republican	7.63%
Louisiana 6th	Republican (flip)	7.82%
New Jersey 7th	Republican	8.00%
Wisconsin 8th	Democratic	8.10%
Florida 22nd	Democratic	9.36%
California 46th	Republican	9.44%
Michigan 9th	Democratic (flip)	9.45%
Arizona 5th	Democratic	9.58%
Maine 1st	Democratic	9.80%
Wyoming at-large	Republican	9.82%
Illinois 13th	Republican	9.91%

== Special elections ==
The thirteen special elections to the 110th United States Congress are listed below by election date.

In 2008 there were eight special elections for vacant seats in the United States House of Representatives, for the 110th United States Congress. In the special elections, Democrats gained three seats while keeping hold of five seats. Republicans held only one of their four seats.

District	Incumbent			This race	
District	Member	Party	First elected	Results	Candidates
Illinois 14	Dennis Hastert	Republican	1986	Incumbent resigned November 26, 2007. New member elected March 8, 2008. Democratic gain.	▌ ✓ Bill Foster (Democratic) 52.53%; ▌Jim Oberweis (Republican) 47.47%
Indiana 7	Julia Carson	Democratic	1996	Incumbent died December 17, 2007. New member elected March 11, 2008. Democratic hold.	▌ ✓ André Carson (Democratic) 54.00%; ▌Jon Elrod (Republican) 43.07%; ▌Sean Shepard (Libertarian) 2.87%
California 12	Tom Lantos	Democratic	1980	Incumbent died February 11, 2008. New member elected April 8, 2008. Democratic hold.	▌ ✓ Jackie Speier (Democratic) 77.72%; ▌Greg Conlon (Republican) 9.37%; ▌Michelle McMurry (Democratic) 5.33%; ▌Mike Moloney (Republican) 5.30%; ▌Barry Hermanson (Green) 2.28%
Louisiana 1	Bobby Jindal	Republican	2004	Incumbent resigned January 14, 2008, to become Governor of Louisiana. New member elected May 3, 2008. Republican hold.	▌ ✓ Steve Scalise (Republican) 75.13%; ▌Gilda Reed (Democratic) 22.50%; ▌R. A. Galan (Independent) 1.74%; ▌Anthony Gentile (Independent) 0.62%
Louisiana 6	Richard Baker	Republican	1986	Incumbent resigned February 2, 2008. New member elected May 3, 2008. Democratic gain.	▌ ✓ Don Cazayoux (Democratic) 49.20%; ▌Woody Jenkins (Republican) 46.27%; ▌Ashley Casey (Independent) 3.68%; ▌Peter J. Aranyosi (Independent) 0.44%; ▌Randall T. Hayes (Constitution) 0.40%
Mississippi 1	Roger Wicker	Republican	1994	Incumbent resigned December 31, 2007, after being appointed to the U.S. Senate. New member elected May 13, 2008. Democratic gain.	▌ ✓ Travis Childers (Democratic) 53.78%; ▌Greg Davis (Republican) 46.22%
Maryland 4	Albert Wynn	Democratic	1992	Incumbent resigned May 31, 2008, after losing renomination. New member elected June 17, 2008. Democratic hold.	▌ ✓ Donna Edwards (Democratic) 80.54%; ▌Peter James (Republican) 17.78%; ▌Thibeaux Lincecum (Libertarian) 1.06%
Ohio 11	Stephanie Tubbs Jones	Democratic	1998	Incumbent died August 20, 2008. New member elected November 18, 2008. Democratic hold.	▌ ✓ Marcia Fudge (Democratic) 97.19%; Uncontested

== Alabama ==
District	CPVI	Incumbent	Party	First elected	Results	Candidates
Alabama 1	R+12	Jo Bonner	Republican	2002	Incumbent re-elected.	▌ ✓ Jo Bonner (Republican) 98.3%
Alabama 2	R+13	Terry Everett	Republican	1992	Incumbent retired. Democratic gain.	▌ ✓ Bobby Bright (Democratic) 50.2%; ▌Jay Love (Republican) 49.6%
Alabama 3	R+4	Mike Rogers	Republican	2002	Incumbent re-elected.	▌ ✓ Mike Rogers (Republican) 54.0%; ▌Josh Segall (Democratic) 45.8%
Alabama 4	R+16	Robert Aderholt	Republican	1996	Incumbent re-elected.	▌ ✓ Robert Aderholt (Republican) 74.8%; ▌Nicholas Sparks (Democratic) 25.1%
Alabama 5	R+6	Bud Cramer	Democratic	1990	Incumbent retired. Democratic hold.	▌ ✓ Parker Griffith (Democratic) 51.5%; ▌Wayne Parker (Republican) 47.9%
Alabama 6	R+25	Spencer Bachus	Republican	1992	Incumbent re-elected.	▌ ✓ Spencer Bachus (Republican) 97.8%
Alabama 7	D+17	Artur Davis	Democratic	2002	Incumbent re-elected.	▌ ✓ Artur Davis (Democratic) 98.6%

== Alaska ==
District	CPVI	Incumbent	Party	First elected	Results	Candidates
Alaska at-large	R+14	Don Young	Republican	1973 (special)	Incumbent re-elected.	▌ ✓ Don Young (Republican) 50.2%; ▌Ethan Berkowitz (Democratic) 45.0%; ▌Don Wright (AKIP) 4.5%

== Arizona ==
District	CPVI	Incumbent	Party	First elected	Results	Candidates
Arizona 1	R+2	Rick Renzi	Republican	2002	Incumbent retired. Democratic gain.	▌ ✓ Ann Kirkpatrick (Democratic) 55.9%; ▌Sydney Hay (Republican) 39.4%; ▌Brent Maupin (Independent) 3.4%; ▌Thane Eichenauer (Libertarian) 1.3%
Arizona 2	R+9	Trent Franks	Republican	2002	Incumbent re-elected.	▌ ✓ Trent Franks (Republican) 59.4%; ▌John Thrasher (Democratic) 37.2%; ▌Powell Gammill (Libertarian) 2.3%; ▌William Crum (Green) 1.1%
Arizona 3	R+6	John Shadegg	Republican	1994	Incumbent re-elected.	▌ ✓ John Shadegg (Republican) 54.1%; ▌Bob Lord (Democratic) 42.1%; ▌Michael Shoen (Libertarian) 3.8%
Arizona 4	D+14	Ed Pastor	Democratic	1991 (special)	Incumbent re-elected.	▌ ✓ Ed Pastor (Democratic) 72.1%; ▌Don Karg (Republican) 21.2%; ▌Rebecca DeWitt (Green) 3.6%; ▌Joe Cobb (Libertarian) 3.1%
Arizona 5	R+4	Harry Mitchell	Democratic	2006	Incumbent re-elected.	▌ ✓ Harry Mitchell (Democratic) 53.2%; ▌David Schweikert (Republican) 43.6%; ▌Warren Severin (Libertarian) 3.2%
Arizona 6	R+12	Jeff Flake	Republican	2000	Incumbent re-elected.	▌ ✓ Jeff Flake (Republican) 62.5%; ▌Rebecca Schneider (Democratic) 34.5%; ▌Rick Biondi (Libertarian) 3.0%
Arizona 7	D+10	Raúl Grijalva	Democratic	2002	Incumbent re-elected.	▌ ✓ Raúl Grijalva (Democratic) 63.3%; ▌Joseph D. Sweeney (Republican) 32.8%; ▌Raymond Patrick Petrulsky (Libertarian) 3.9%
Arizona 8	R+1	Gabby Giffords	Democratic	2006	Incumbent re-elected.	▌ ✓ Gabby Giffords (Democratic) 54.7%; ▌Tim Bee (Republican) 42.8%; ▌Paul Davis (Libertarian) 2.5%

== Arkansas ==
District	CPVI	Incumbent	Party	First elected	Results	Candidates
Arkansas 1	D+1	Marion Berry	Democratic	1996	Incumbent re-elected.	▌ ✓ Marion Berry (Democratic) Uncontested
Arkansas 2	Even	Vic Snyder	Democratic	1996	Incumbent re-elected.	▌ ✓ Vic Snyder (Democratic) 76.5%; ▌Deb McFarland (Green) 23.2%
Arkansas 3	R+11	John Boozman	Republican	2000	Incumbent re-elected.	▌ ✓ John Boozman (Republican) 78.5%; ▌Abel Tomlinson (Green) 21.5%
Arkansas 4	Even	Mike Ross	Democratic	2000	Incumbent re-elected.	▌ ✓ Mike Ross (Democratic) 86.2%; ▌Joshua Drake (Green) 13.8%

== California ==
District	CPVI	Incumbent	Party	First elected	Results	Candidates
California 1	D+10	Mike Thompson	Democratic	1998	Incumbent re-elected.	▌ ✓ Mike Thompson (Democratic) 68.2%; ▌Zane Starkewolf (Republican) 23.3%; ▌Carol Wolman (Green) 8.5%
California 2	R+13	Wally Herger	Republican	1986	Incumbent re-elected.	▌ ✓ Wally Herger (Republican) 57.9%; ▌Jeff Morris (Democratic) 42.1%
California 3	R+7	Dan Lungren	Republican	1978; 1988 (retired); 2004	Incumbent re-elected.	▌ ✓ Dan Lungren (Republican) 49.5%; ▌Bill Durston (Democratic) 44.0%; ▌Dina Padilla (Peace and Freedom) 4.2%; ▌Art Tuma (Libertarian) 2.3%
California 4	R+11	John Doolittle	Republican	1990	Incumbent retired. Republican hold.	▌ ✓ Tom McClintock (Republican) 50.3%; ▌Charles Brown (Democratic) 49.7%
California 5	D+14	Doris Matsui	Democratic	2005	Incumbent re-elected.	▌ ✓ Doris Matsui (Democratic) 74.3%; ▌Paul Smith (Republican) 20.9%; ▌L. R. Roberts (Peace and Freedom) 4.8%
California 6	D+21	Lynn Woolsey	Democratic	1992	Incumbent re-elected.	▌ ✓ Lynn Woolsey (Democratic) 71.7%; ▌Mike Halliwell (Republican) 24.1%; ▌Joel Smolen (Libertarian) 4.2%
California 7	D+19	George Miller	Democratic	1974	Incumbent re-elected.	▌ ✓ George Miller (Democratic) 72.9%; ▌Roger Petersen (Republican) 21.8%; ▌Bill Callison (Peace and Freedom) 2.8%; ▌Camden McConnell (Libertarian) 2.5%
California 8	D+36	Nancy Pelosi	Democratic	1987 (special)	Incumbent re-elected.	▌ ✓ Nancy Pelosi (Democratic) 71.9%; ▌Cindy Sheehan (Independent) 16.2%; ▌Dana Walsh (Republican) 9.7%; ▌Philip Berg (Libertarian) 2.2%
California 9	D+38	Barbara Lee	Democratic	1998	Incumbent re-elected.	▌ ✓ Barbara Lee (Democratic) 86.1%; ▌Charles Hargrave (Republican) 9.7%; ▌Jim Eyer (Libertarian) 4.2%
California 10	D+9	Ellen Tauscher	Democratic	1996	Incumbent re-elected.	▌ ✓ Ellen Tauscher (Democratic) 65.2%; ▌Nicholas Gerber (Republican) 31.1%; ▌Eugene Ruyle (Peace and Freedom) 3.7%
California 11	R+3	Jerry McNerney	Democratic	2006	Incumbent re-elected.	▌ ✓ Jerry McNerney (Democratic) 55.3%; ▌Dean Andal (Republican) 44.7%
California 12	D+22	Jackie Speier	Democratic	April 8, 2008 (special)	Incumbent re-elected.	▌ ✓ Jackie Speier (Democratic) 75.2%; ▌Greg Conlon (Republican) 18.5%; ▌Nathalie Hrizi (Peace and Freedom) 2.2%; ▌Barry Hermanson (Green) 2.1%; ▌Kevin Peterson (Libertarian) 2.0%
California 13	D+22	Pete Stark	Democratic	1972	Incumbent re-elected.	▌ ✓ Pete Stark (Democratic) 76.5%; ▌Raymond Chui (Republican) 23.5%
California 14	D+18	Anna Eshoo	Democratic	1992	Incumbent re-elected.	▌ ✓ Anna Eshoo (Democratic) 69.8%; ▌Ronny Santana (Republican) 22.3%; ▌Brian Holtz (Libertarian) 4.3%; ▌Carol Brouillet (Green) 3.6%
California 15	D+14	Mike Honda	Democratic	2000	Incumbent re-elected.	▌ ✓ Mike Honda (Democratic) 71.7%; ▌Joyce Cordi (Republican) 23.3%; ▌Peter Myers (Green) 5.0%
California 16	D+16	Zoe Lofgren	Democratic	1994	Incumbent re-elected.	▌ ✓ Zoe Lofgren (Democratic) 71.4%; ▌Charel Winston (Republican) 24.0%; ▌Steven Wells (Libertarian) 4.6%
California 17	D+17	Sam Farr	Democratic	1992	Incumbent re-elected.	▌ ✓ Sam Farr (Democratic) 73.9%; ▌Jeff Taylor (Republican) 25.9%
California 18	D+3	Dennis Cardoza	Democratic	2002	Incumbent re-elected.	▌ ✓ Dennis Cardoza (Democratic) 100%
California 19	R+10	George Radanovich	Republican	1994	Incumbent re-elected.	▌ ✓ George Radanovich (Republican) 98.5%
California 20	D+5	Jim Costa	Democratic	2004	Incumbent re-elected.	▌ ✓ Jim Costa (Democratic) 74.4%; ▌Jim Lopez (Republican) 25.6%
California 21	R+13	Devin Nunes	Republican	2002	Incumbent re-elected.	▌ ✓ Devin Nunes (Republican) 68.4%; ▌Larry Johnson (Democratic) 31.6%
California 22	R+16	Kevin McCarthy	Republican	2006	Incumbent re-elected.	▌ ✓ Kevin McCarthy (Republican) 100%
California 23	D+9	Lois Capps	Democratic	1998	Incumbent re-elected.	▌ ✓ Lois Capps (Democratic) 68.1%; ▌Matt Kokkonen (Republican) 31.9%
California 24	R+5	Elton Gallegly	Republican	1986	Incumbent re-elected.	▌ ✓ Elton Gallegly (Republican) 58.2%; ▌Marta Jorgensen (Democratic) 41.8%
California 25	R+7	Howard McKeon	Republican	1992	Incumbent re-elected.	▌ ✓ Howard McKeon (Republican) 57.8%; ▌Jackie Conaway (Democratic) 42.2%
California 26	R+4	David Dreier	Republican	1980	Incumbent re-elected.	▌ ✓ David Dreier (Republican) 52.7%; ▌Russ Warner (Democratic) 40.4%; ▌Ted Brown (Libertarian) 6.9%
California 27	D+13	Brad Sherman	Democratic	1996	Incumbent re-elected.	▌ ✓ Brad Sherman (Democratic) 68.6%; ▌Navraj Singh (Republican) 24.8%; ▌Tim Denton (Libertarian) 6.6%
California 28	D+25	Howard Berman	Democratic	1982	Incumbent re-elected.	▌ ✓ Howard Berman (Democratic) 99.9%
California 29	D+12	Adam Schiff	Democratic	2000	Incumbent re-elected.	▌ ✓ Adam Schiff (Democratic) 69.0%; ▌Charles Hahn (Republican) 26.7%; ▌Alan Pyeatt (Libertarian) 4.3%
California 30	D+20	Henry Waxman	Democratic	1974	Incumbent re-elected.	▌ ✓ Henry Waxman (Democratic) 100%
California 31	D+30	Xavier Becerra	Democratic	1992	Incumbent re-elected.	▌ ✓ Xavier Becerra (Democratic) 100%
California 32	D+17	Hilda Solis	Democratic	2000	Incumbent re-elected.	▌ ✓ Hilda Solis (Democratic) 100%
California 33	D+36	Diane Watson	Democratic	2001 (special)	Incumbent re-elected.	▌ ✓ Diane Watson (Democratic) 87.6%; ▌David Crowley (Republican) 12.4%
California 34	D+23	Lucille Roybal-Allard	Democratic	1992	Incumbent re-elected.	▌ ✓ Lucille Roybal-Allard (Democratic) 77.1%; ▌Christopher Balding (Republican) 22.9%
California 35	D+33	Maxine Waters	Democratic	1990	Incumbent re-elected.	▌ ✓ Maxine Waters (Democratic) 82.6%; ▌Ted Hayes (Republican) 13.3%; ▌Herb Peters (Libertarian) 4.1%
California 36	D+11	Jane Harman	Democratic	1992; 1998 (retired); 2000	Incumbent re-elected.	▌ ✓ Jane Harman (Democratic) 68.7%; ▌Brian Gibson (Republican) 31.3%
California 37	D+27	Laura Richardson	Democratic	2007 (special)	Incumbent re-elected.	▌ ✓ Laura Richardson (Democratic) 75.0%; ▌Nick Dibs (Independent) 24.4%
California 38	D+20	Grace Napolitano	Democratic	1998	Incumbent re-elected.	▌ ✓ Grace Napolitano (Democratic) 81.8%; ▌Christopher Agrella (Libertarian) 18.2%
California 39	D+13	Linda Sánchez	Democratic	2002	Incumbent re-elected.	▌ ✓ Linda Sánchez (Democratic) 69.7%; ▌Diane Lenning (Republican) 30.3%
California 40	R+8	Ed Royce	Republican	1992	Incumbent re-elected.	▌ ✓ Ed Royce (Republican) 62.6%; ▌Christina Avalos (Democratic) 37.4%
California 41	R+9	Jerry Lewis	Republican	1978	Incumbent re-elected.	▌ ✓ Jerry Lewis (Republican) 61.7%; ▌Tim Prince (Democratic) 38.3%
California 42	R+10	Gary Miller	Republican	1998	Incumbent re-elected.	▌ ✓ Gary Miller (Republican) 60.2%; ▌Ed Chau (Democratic) 39.8%
California 43	D+13	Joe Baca	Democratic	1999 (special)	Incumbent re-elected.	▌ ✓ Joe Baca (Democratic) 69.2%; ▌John Roberts (Republican) 30.8%
California 44	R+6	Ken Calvert	Republican	1992	Incumbent re-elected.	▌ ✓ Ken Calvert (Republican) 51.2%; ▌Bill Hedrick (Democratic) 48.8%
California 45	R+3	Mary Bono	Republican	1998	Incumbent re-elected.	▌ ✓ Mary Bono (Republican) 58.3%; ▌Julie Bornstein (Democratic) 41.7%
California 46	R+6	Dana Rohrabacher	Republican	1988	Incumbent re-elected.	▌ ✓ Dana Rohrabacher (Republican) 52.6%; ▌Debbie Cook (Democratic) 43.1%; ▌Tom Lash (Green) 2.8%; ▌Ernst Gasteiger (Libertarian) 1.5%
California 47	D+5	Loretta Sanchez	Democratic	1996	Incumbent re-elected.	▌ ✓ Loretta Sanchez (Democratic) 69.5%; ▌Rosie Avila (Republican) 25.5%; ▌Robert Lauten (American Independent) 5.0%
California 48	R+8	John Campbell	Republican	2005 (special)	Incumbent re-elected.	▌ ✓ John Campbell (Republican) 55.7%; ▌Steve Young (Democratic) 40.6%; ▌Don Patterson (Libertarian) 3.7%
California 49	R+10	Darrell Issa	Republican	2000	Incumbent re-elected.	▌ ✓ Darrell Issa (Republican) 58.3%; ▌Robert Hamilton (Democratic) 37.5%; ▌Lars Grossmith (Libertarian) 4.2%
California 50	R+5	Brian Bilbray	Republican	1994; 2000 (defeated); 2006 (special)	Incumbent re-elected.	▌ ✓ Brian Bilbray (Republican) 50.3%; ▌Nick Leibham (Democratic) 45.2%; ▌Wayne Dunlap (Libertarian) 4.5%
California 51	D+7	Bob Filner	Democratic	1992	Incumbent re-elected.	▌ ✓ Bob Filner (Democratic) 72.8%; ▌David Lee Joy (Republican) 24.2%; ▌Frodo Litwin (Libertarian) 3.0%
California 52	R+9	Duncan L. Hunter	Republican	1980	Incumbent retired. Republican hold.	▌ ✓ Duncan D. Hunter (Republican) 56.4%; ▌Mike Lumpkin (Democratic) 39.0%; ▌Michael Benoit (Libertarian) 4.6%
California 53	D+12	Susan Davis	Democratic	2000	Incumbent re-elected.	▌ ✓ Susan Davis (Democratic) 68.5%; ▌Michael Crimmins (Republican) 27.5%; ▌Edward Teyssier (Libertarian) 4.0%

== Colorado ==
District	CPVI	Incumbent	Party	First elected	Results	Candidates
Colorado 1	D+18	Diana DeGette	Democratic	1996	Incumbent re-elected.	▌ ✓ Diana DeGette (Democratic) 71.9%; ▌George Lilly (Republican) 23.8%; ▌Martin Buchanan (Libertarian) 4.3%
Colorado 2	D+8	Mark Udall	Democratic	1998	Incumbent retired to run for U.S. Senator. Democratic hold.	▌ ✓ Jared Polis (Democratic) 62.6%; ▌Scott Starin (Republican) 33.9%; ▌J. A. Calhoun (Green) 2.9%; ▌Bill Hammons (Unity) 0.6%
Colorado 3	R+6	John Salazar	Democratic	2004	Incumbent re-elected.	▌ ✓ John Salazar (Democratic) 61.6%; ▌Wayne Wolf (Republican) 38.4%
Colorado 4	R+9	Marilyn Musgrave	Republican	2002	Incumbent lost re-election. Democratic gain.	▌ ✓ Betsy Markey (Democratic) 56.2%; ▌Marilyn Musgrave (Republican) 43.8%
Colorado 5	R+16	Doug Lamborn	Republican	2006	Incumbent re-elected.	▌ ✓ Doug Lamborn (Republican) 60.0%; ▌Hal Bidlack (Democratic) 37.0%; ▌Brian Scott (Constitution) 2.9%
Colorado 6	R+10	Tom Tancredo	Republican	1998	Incumbent retired. Republican hold.	▌ ✓ Mike Coffman (Republican) 60.7%; ▌Hank Eng (Democratic) 39.3%
Colorado 7	D+2	Ed Perlmutter	Democratic	2006	Incumbent re-elected.	▌ ✓ Ed Perlmutter (Democratic) 63.5%; ▌John Lerew (Republican) 36.5%

== Connecticut ==
District	CPVI	Incumbent	Party	First elected	Results	Candidates
Connecticut 1	D+14	John Larson	Democratic	1998	Incumbent re-elected.	▌ ✓ John Larson (Democratic) 71.6%; ▌Joe Visconti (Republican) 26.0%; ▌Steve Fournier (Green) 2.4%
Connecticut 2	D+8	Joe Courtney	Democratic	2006	Incumbent re-elected.	▌ ✓ Joe Courtney (Democratic) 65.7%; ▌Sean Sullivan (Republican) 32.4%; ▌Scott Deshefy (Green) 1.9%
Connecticut 3	D+12	Rosa DeLauro	Democratic	1990	Incumbent re-elected.	▌ ✓ Rosa DeLauro (Democratic) 77.4%; ▌Bo ItsHaky (Republican) 19.7%; ▌Ralph Ferrucci (Green) 2.9%
Connecticut 4	D+5	Chris Shays	Republican	1987 (special)	Incumbent lost re-election. Democratic gain.	▌ ✓ Jim Himes (Democratic) 51.3%; ▌Chris Shays (Republican) 47.6%; ▌Michael Carrano (Libertarian) 0.7%; ▌Richard Duffee (Green) 0.4%
Connecticut 5	D+4	Chris Murphy	Democratic	2006	Incumbent re-elected.	▌ ✓ Chris Murphy (Democratic) 59.2%; ▌David Cappiello (Republican) 39.0%; ▌Harold Burbank (Green) 1.0%; ▌Thomas Winn (Independent) 0.8%

== Delaware ==
District	CPVI	Incumbent	Party	First elected	Results	Candidates
Delaware at-large	D+7	Mike Castle	Republican	1992	Incumbent re-elected.	▌ ✓ Mike Castle (Republican) 61.1%; ▌Karen Hartley-Nagle (Democratic) 38.0%; ▌Mark Parks (Libertarian) 0.9%

== Florida ==
District	CPVI	Incumbent	Party	First elected	Results	Candidates
Florida 1	R+19	Jeff Miller	Republican	2001 (special)	Incumbent re-elected.	▌ ✓ Jeff Miller (Republican) 70.2%; ▌James Bryan (Democratic) 29.8%
Florida 2	R+2	Allen Boyd	Democratic	1996	Incumbent re-elected.	▌ ✓ Allen Boyd (Democratic) 61.9%; ▌Mark Mulligan (Republican) 38.1%
Florida 3	D+14	Corrine Brown	Democratic	1992	Incumbent re-elected.	▌ ✓ Corrine Brown (Democratic) Uncontested
Florida 4	R+14	Ander Crenshaw	Republican	2000	Incumbent re-elected.	▌ ✓ Ander Crenshaw (Republican) 65.3%; ▌Jay McGovern (Democratic) 34.7%
Florida 5	R+5	Ginny Brown-Waite	Republican	2002	Incumbent re-elected.	▌ ✓ Ginny Brown-Waite (Republican) 61.2%; ▌John Russell (Democratic) 38.8%
Florida 6	R+8	Cliff Stearns	Republican	1988	Incumbent re-elected.	▌ ✓ Cliff Stearns (Republican) 60.9%; ▌Tim Cunha (Democratic) 39.1%
Florida 7	R+4	John Mica	Republican	1992	Incumbent re-elected.	▌ ✓ John Mica (Republican) 62.0%; ▌Faye Armitage (Democratic) 38.0%
Florida 8	R+3	Ric Keller	Republican	2000	Incumbent lost re-election. Democratic gain.	▌ ✓ Alan Grayson (Democratic) 52.0%; ▌Ric Keller (Republican) 48.0%
Florida 9	R+4	Gus Bilirakis	Republican	2006	Incumbent re-elected.	▌ ✓ Gus Bilirakis (Republican) 62.2%; ▌Bill Mitchell (Democratic) 36.3%; ▌Johnny Kalimnios (Independent) 1.0%; ▌Richard Emmons (Term Limits) 0.6%
Florida 10	D+1	Bill Young	Republican	1970	Incumbent re-elected.	▌ ✓ Bill Young (Republican) 60.7%; ▌Bob Hackworth (Democratic) 39.3%
Florida 11	D+11	Kathy Castor	Democratic	2006	Incumbent re-elected.	▌ ✓ Kathy Castor (Democratic) 71.7%; ▌Eddie Adams (Republican) 28.3%
Florida 12	R+5	Adam Putnam	Republican	2000	Incumbent re-elected.	▌ ✓ Adam Putnam (Republican) 57.5%; ▌Doug Tudor (Democratic) 42.5%
Florida 13	R+4	Vern Buchanan	Republican	2006	Incumbent re-elected.	▌ ✓ Vern Buchanan (Republican) 55.5%; ▌Christine Jennings (Democratic) 37.5%; ▌Jan Schneider (Independent) 5.5%; ▌Don Baldauf (Independent) 1.5%
Florida 14	R+10	Connie Mack IV	Republican	2004	Incumbent re-elected.	▌ ✓ Connie Mack IV (Republican) 59.4%; ▌Robert Neeld (Democratic) 24.8%; ▌Burt Saunders (Independent) 14.5%; ▌Jeff George (Independent) 1.3%
Florida 15	R+4	Dave Weldon	Republican	1994	Incumbent retired. Republican hold.	▌ ✓ Bill Posey (Republican) 53.1%; ▌Stephen Blythe (Democratic) 42.0%; ▌Frank Zilaitis (Independent) 3.9%; ▌Trevor Lowing (Independent) 1.0%
Florida 16	R+2	Tim Mahoney	Democratic	2006	Incumbent lost re-election. Republican gain.	▌ ✓ Tom Rooney (Republican) 60.1%; ▌Tim Mahoney (Democratic) 39.9%
Florida 17	D+35	Kendrick Meek	Democratic	2002	Incumbent re-elected.	▌ ✓ Kendrick Meek (Democratic) Uncontested
Florida 18	R+4	Ileana Ros-Lehtinen	Republican	1989	Incumbent re-elected.	▌ ✓ Ileana Ros-Lehtinen (Republican) 57.9%; ▌Annette Taddeo (Democratic) 42.1%
Florida 19	D+21	Robert Wexler	Democratic	1996	Incumbent re-elected.	▌ ✓ Robert Wexler (Democratic) 66.2%; ▌Edward Lynch (Republican) 27.2%; ▌Ben Graber (Independent) 6.6%
Florida 20	D+18	Debbie Wasserman Schultz	Democratic	2004	Incumbent re-elected.	▌ ✓ Debbie Wasserman Schultz (Democratic) 77.5%; ▌Margaret Hostetter (Ind. Republican) 22.5%
Florida 21	R+6	Lincoln Díaz-Balart	Republican	1992	Incumbent re-elected.	▌ ✓ Lincoln Díaz-Balart (Republican) 57.9%; ▌Raul Martinez (Democratic) 42.1%
Florida 22	D+4	Ron Klein	Democratic	2006	Incumbent re-elected.	▌ ✓ Ron Klein (Democratic) 54.7%; ▌Allen West (Republican) 45.3%
Florida 23	D+29	Alcee Hastings	Democratic	1992	Incumbent re-elected.	▌ ✓ Alcee Hastings (Democratic) 82.1%; ▌Marion Thorpe (Republican) 17.8%
Florida 24	R+3	Tom Feeney	Republican	2002	Incumbent lost re-election. Democratic gain.	▌ ✓ Suzanne Kosmas (Democratic) 57.2%; ▌Tom Feeney (Republican) 41.1%; ▌Gaurav Bhola (Independent) 1.7%
Florida 25	R+4	Mario Díaz-Balart	Republican	2002	Incumbent re-elected.	▌ ✓ Mario Díaz-Balart (Republican) 53.1%; ▌Joe Garcia (Democratic) 46.9%

== Georgia ==
District	CPVI	Incumbent	Party	First elected	Results	Candidates
Georgia 1	R+13	Jack Kingston	Republican	1992	Incumbent re-elected.	▌ ✓ Jack Kingston (Republican) 66.5%; ▌Bill Gillespie (Democratic) 33.5%
Georgia 2	D+2	Sanford Bishop	Democratic	1992	Incumbent re-elected.	▌ ✓ Sanford Bishop (Democratic) 68.9%; ▌Lee Ferrell (Republican) 31.1%
Georgia 3	R+18	Lynn Westmoreland	Republican	2004	Incumbent re-elected.	▌ ✓ Lynn Westmoreland (Republican) 65.7%; ▌Stephen Camp (Democratic) 34.3%
Georgia 4	D+22	Hank Johnson	Democratic	2006	Incumbent re-elected.	▌ ✓ Hank Johnson (Democratic) 99.9%
Georgia 5	D+25	John Lewis	Democratic	1986	Incumbent re-elected.	▌ ✓ John Lewis (Democratic) 99.9%
Georgia 6	R+18	Tom Price	Republican	2004	Incumbent re-elected.	▌ ✓ Tom Price (Republican) 68.5%; ▌Bill Jones (Democratic) 31.5%
Georgia 7	R+18	John Linder	Republican	1992	Incumbent re-elected.	▌ ✓ John Linder (Republican) 62.0%; ▌Doug Heckman (Democratic) 38.0%
Georgia 8	R+8	Jim Marshall	Democratic	2002	Incumbent re-elected.	▌ ✓ Jim Marshall (Democratic) 57.2%; ▌Rick Goddard (Republican) 42.8%
Georgia 9	R+23	Nathan Deal	Republican	1992 (Note: Deal was originally elected as a Democrat. He switched parties in April 1995.)	Incumbent re-elected.	▌ ✓ Nathan Deal (Republican) 75.5%; ▌Jeff Scott (Democratic) 24.5%
Georgia 10	R+13	Paul Broun	Republican	2007 (special)	Incumbent re-elected.	▌ ✓ Paul Broun (Republican) 60.7%; ▌Bobby Saxon (Democratic) 39.3%
Georgia 11	R+17	Phil Gingrey	Republican	2002	Incumbent re-elected.	▌ ✓ Phil Gingrey (Republican) 68.2%; ▌Hugh Gammon (Democratic) 31.8%
Georgia 12	D+5	John Barrow	Democratic	2004	Incumbent re-elected.	▌ ✓ John Barrow (Democratic) 66.0%; ▌John Stone (Republican) 34.0%
Georgia 13	D+10	David Scott	Democratic	2002	Incumbent re-elected.	▌ ✓ David Scott (Democratic) 69.0%; ▌Deborah Honeycutt (Republican) 31.0%

== Hawaii ==
District	CPVI	Incumbent	Party	First elected	Results	Candidates
Hawaii 1	D+7	Neil Abercrombie	Democratic	1986 (special); 1988 (lost renomination); 1990	Incumbent re-elected.	▌ ✓ Neil Abercrombie (Democratic) 77.1%; ▌Steve Tataii (Republican) 19.1%; ▌Li Zhao (Libertarian) 3.8%
Hawaii 2	D+10	Mazie Hirono	Democratic	2006	Incumbent re-elected.	▌ ✓ Mazie Hirono (Democratic) 76.1%; ▌Roger B. Evans (Republican) 20.4%; ▌Shaun Stenshol (Independent) 1.9%; ▌Jeff Mallan (Libertarian) 1.7%

== Idaho ==
District	CPVI	Incumbent	Party	First elected	Results	Candidates
Idaho 1	R+19	Bill Sali	Republican	2006	Incumbent lost re-election. Democratic gain.	▌ ✓ Walt Minnick (Democratic) 50.6%; ▌Bill Sali (Republican) 49.4%
Idaho 2	R+19	Mike Simpson	Republican	1998	Incumbent re-elected.	▌ ✓ Mike Simpson (Republican) 71.0%; ▌Debbie Holmes (Democratic) 29.0%

== Illinois ==
District	CPVI	Incumbent	Party	First elected	Results	Candidates
Illinois 1	D+35	Bobby Rush	Democratic	1992	Incumbent re-elected.	▌ ✓ Bobby Rush (Democratic) 85.9%; ▌Antoine Members (Republican) 14.1%
Illinois 2	D+35	Jesse Jackson Jr.	Democratic	1995 (special)	Incumbent re-elected.	▌ ✓ Jesse Jackson Jr. (Democratic) 89.4%; ▌Anthony Williams (Republican) 10.6%
Illinois 3	D+10	Dan Lipinski	Democratic	2004	Incumbent re-elected.	▌ ✓ Dan Lipinski (Democratic) 73.3%; ▌Michael Hawkins (Republican) 21.4%; ▌Jerome Pohlen (Green) 5.3%
Illinois 4	D+31	Luis Gutiérrez	Democratic	1992	Incumbent re-elected.	▌ ✓ Luis Gutiérrez (Democratic) 80.6%; ▌Daniel Cunningham (Republican) 11.5%; ▌Omar Lopez (Green) 7.9%
Illinois 5	D+18	Rahm Emanuel	Democratic	2002	Incumbent re-elected, but resigned to become White House Chief of Staff.	▌ ✓ Rahm Emanuel (Democratic) 73.9%; ▌Tom Hanson (Republican) 22.0%; ▌Alan Augustson (Green) 4.1%
Illinois 6	R+3	Peter Roskam	Republican	2006	Incumbent re-elected.	▌ ✓ Peter Roskam (Republican) 57.6%; ▌Jill Morgenthaler (Democratic) 42.4%
Illinois 7	D+35	Danny K. Davis	Democratic	1996	Incumbent re-elected.	▌ ✓ Danny K. Davis (Democratic) 85.0%; ▌Steve Miller (Republican) 15.0%
Illinois 8	R+5	Melissa Bean	Democratic	2004	Incumbent re-elected.	▌ ✓ Melissa Bean (Democratic) 60.7%; ▌Steve Greenberg (Republican) 39.3%
Illinois 9	D+20	Jan Schakowsky	Democratic	1998	Incumbent re-elected.	▌ ✓ Jan Schakowsky (Democratic) 74.7%; ▌Michael Younan (Republican) 22.0%; ▌Morris Shanfield (Green) 3.3%
Illinois 10	D+4	Mark Kirk	Republican	2000	Incumbent re-elected.	▌ ✓ Mark Kirk (Republican) 52.6%; ▌Dan Seals (Democratic) 47.4%
Illinois 11	R+1	Jerry Weller	Republican	1994	Incumbent retired. Democratic gain.	▌ ✓ Debbie Halvorson (Democratic) 58.4%; ▌Marty Ozinga (Republican) 34.5%; ▌Jason Wallace (Green) 7.1%
Illinois 12	D+5	Jerry Costello	Democratic	1988	Incumbent re-elected.	▌ ✓ Jerry Costello (Democratic) 71.1%; ▌Tim Richardson (Republican) 25.0%; ▌Rodger Jennings (Green) 3.9%
Illinois 13	R+5	Judy Biggert	Republican	1998	Incumbent re-elected.	▌ ✓ Judy Biggert (Republican) 53.6%; ▌Scott Harper (Democratic) 43.7%; ▌Steve Alesch (Green) 2.7%
Illinois 14	R+5	Bill Foster	Democratic	March 8, 2008 (special)	Incumbent re-elected.	▌ ✓ Bill Foster (Democratic) 57.7%; ▌Jim Oberweis (Republican) 42.3%
Illinois 15	R+6	Tim Johnson	Republican	2000	Incumbent re-elected.	▌ ✓ Tim Johnson (Republican) 64.2%; ▌Steve Cox (Democratic) 35.8%
Illinois 16	R+4	Donald Manzullo	Republican	1992	Incumbent re-elected.	▌ ✓ Donald Manzullo (Republican) 60.9%; ▌Bob Abboud (Democratic) 36.1%; ▌Scott Summers (Green) 3.0%
Illinois 17	D+5	Phil Hare	Democratic	2006	Incumbent re-elected.	▌ ✓ Phil Hare (Democratic) 99.8%
Illinois 18	R+5	Ray LaHood	Republican	1994	Incumbent retired. Republican hold.	▌ ✓ Aaron Schock (Republican) 58.9%; ▌Colleen Callahan (Democratic) 37.9%; ▌Sheldon Schafer (Green) 3.2%
Illinois 19	R+8	John Shimkus	Republican	1996	Incumbent re-elected.	▌ ✓ John Shimkus (Republican) 64.5%; ▌Daniel Davis (Democratic) 33.4%; ▌Troy Dennis (Green) 2.1%

== Indiana ==
District	CPVI	Incumbent	Party	First elected	Results	Candidates
Indiana 1	D+8	Pete Visclosky	Democratic	1984	Incumbent re-elected.	▌ ✓ Pete Visclosky (Democratic) 70.9%; ▌Mark Leyva (Republican) 27.2%; ▌Jeff Duensing (Libertarian) 1.9%
Indiana 2	R+4	Joe Donnelly	Democratic	2006	Incumbent re-elected.	▌ ✓ Joe Donnelly (Democratic) 67.1%; ▌Luke Puckett (Republican) 30.2%; ▌Mark Vogel (Libertarian) 2.7%
Indiana 3	R+16	Mark Souder	Republican	1994	Incumbent re-elected.	▌ ✓ Mark Souder (Republican) 55.0%; ▌Mike Montagano (Democratic) 39.7%; ▌ William Larsen (Libertarian) 5.3%
Indiana 4	R+17	Steve Buyer	Republican	1992	Incumbent re-elected.	▌ ✓ Steve Buyer (Republican) 59.9%; ▌Nels Ackerson (Democratic) 40.1%
Indiana 5	R+20	Dan Burton	Republican	1982	Incumbent re-elected.	▌ ✓ Dan Burton (Republican) 65.5%; ▌Mary Etta Ruley (Democratic) 34.5%
Indiana 6	R+11	Mike Pence	Republican	2000	Incumbent re-elected.	▌ ✓ Mike Pence (Republican) 63.9%; ▌Barry Welsh (Democratic) 33.4%; ▌George Holland (Libertarian) 2.7%
Indiana 7	D+9	André Carson	Democratic	March 11, 2008 (special)	Incumbent re-elected.	▌ ✓ André Carson (Democratic) 65.1%; ▌Gabrielle Campo (Republican) 34.9%
Indiana 8	R+9	Brad Ellsworth	Democratic	2006	Incumbent re-elected.	▌ ✓ Brad Ellsworth (Democratic) 64.7%; ▌Greg Goode (Republican) 35.3%
Indiana 9	R+7	Baron Hill	Democratic	1998; 2004 (defeated); 2006	Incumbent re-elected.	▌ ✓ Baron Hill (Democratic) 57.8%; ▌Mike Sodrel (Republican) 38.4%; ▌D. Eric Schansberg (Libertarian) 3.8%

== Iowa ==
District	CPVI	Incumbent	Party	First elected	Results	Candidates
Iowa 1	D+5	Bruce Braley	Democratic	2006	Incumbent re-elected.	▌ ✓ Bruce Braley (Democratic) 64.6%; ▌David Hartsuch (Republican) 35.4%
Iowa 2	D+7	Dave Loebsack	Democratic	2006	Incumbent re-elected.	▌ ✓ Dave Loebsack (Democratic) 57.2%; ▌Mariannette Miller-Meeks (Republican) 38.8%; ▌Wendy Barth (Green) 2.2%; ▌Brian White (Independent) 1.8%
Iowa 3	D+1	Leonard Boswell	Democratic	1996	Incumbent re-elected.	▌ ✓ Leonard Boswell (Democratic) 56.4%; ▌ Kim Schmett (Republican) 42.1%; ▌Frank Forrestal (Socialist Workers) 1.5%
Iowa 4	Even	Tom Latham	Republican	1994	Incumbent re-elected.	▌ ✓ Tom Latham (Republican) 60.6%; ▌Becky Greenwald (Democratic) 39.4%
Iowa 5	R+8	Steve King	Republican	2002	Incumbent re-elected.	▌ ✓ Steve King (Republican) 59.8%; ▌Rob Hubler (Democratic) 37.4%; ▌Victor Vara (Independent) 2.8%

== Kansas ==
District	CPVI	Incumbent	Party	First elected	Results	Candidates
Kansas 1	R+20	Jerry Moran	Republican	1996	Incumbent re-elected.	▌ ✓ Jerry Moran (Republican) 81.8%; ▌James Bordonaro (Democratic) 13.2%; ▌Kathleen Burton (Reform) 2.7%; ▌Jack Warner (Libertarian) 2.1%
Kansas 2	R+7	Nancy Boyda	Democratic	2006	Incumbent lost re-election. Republican gain.	▌ ✓ Lynn Jenkins (Republican) 50.6%; ▌Nancy Boyda (Democratic) 46.2%; ▌Leslie Martin (Reform) 1.6%; ▌Robert Garrard (Libertarian) 1.5%
Kansas 3	R+4	Dennis Moore	Democratic	1998	Incumbent re-elected.	▌ ✓ Dennis Moore (Democratic) 56.4%; ▌Nick Jordan (Republican) 39.6%; ▌Joe Bellis (Libertarian) 2.8%; ▌Roger Tucker (Reform) 1.0%
Kansas 4	R+12	Todd Tiahrt	Republican	1994	Incumbent re-elected.	▌ ✓ Todd Tiahrt (Republican) 63.4%; ▌Donald Betts (Democratic) 32.3%; ▌Susan Ducey (Reform) 2.2%; ▌Steven Rosile (Libertarian) 1.9%

== Kentucky ==
District	CPVI	Incumbent	Party	First elected	Results	Candidates
Kentucky 1	R+10	Ed Whitfield	Republican	1994	Incumbent re-elected.	▌ ✓ Ed Whitfield (Republican) 64.3%; ▌Heather Ryan (Democratic) 35.7%
Kentucky 2	R+13	Ron Lewis	Republican	1994	Incumbent retired. Republican hold.	▌ ✓ Brett Guthrie (Republican) 52.6%; ▌David Boswell (Democratic) 47.4%
Kentucky 3	D+2	John Yarmuth	Democratic	2006	Incumbent re-elected.	▌ ✓ John Yarmuth (Democratic) 59.4%; ▌Anne Northup (Republican) 40.6%
Kentucky 4	R+12	Geoff Davis	Republican	2004	Incumbent re-elected.	▌ ✓ Geoff Davis (Republican) 63.0%; ▌Michael Kelly (Democratic) 37.0%
Kentucky 5	R+8	Hal Rogers	Republican	1980	Incumbent re-elected.	▌ ✓ Hal Rogers (Republican) 84.1%; ▌Jim Holbert (Independent) 15.9%
Kentucky 6	R+7	Ben Chandler	Democratic	2004	Incumbent re-elected.	▌ ✓ Ben Chandler (Democratic) 64.7%; ▌Jon Larson (Republican) 35.3%

== Louisiana ==
Note: In Louisiana's 2nd and 4th districts, primary runoffs were held November 4, 2008 and the general election for both of these races were held December 6, 2008.

District	CPVI	Incumbent	Party	First elected	Results	Candidates
Louisiana 1	R+18	Steve Scalise	Republican	May 3, 2008 (special)	Incumbent re-elected.	▌ ✓ Steve Scalise (Republican) 65.7%; ▌Jim Harlan (Democratic) 34.3%
Louisiana 2	D+28	William Jefferson	Democratic	1990	Incumbent lost re-election. Republican gain.	▌ ✓ Joseph Cao (Republican) 49.5%; ▌Bill Jefferson (Democratic) 46.8%; ▌Malik Rahim (Green) 2.8%; ▌Gregory Kahn (Libertarian) 0.8%
Louisiana 3	R+5	Charlie Melançon	Democratic	2004	Incumbent re-elected.	▌ ✓ Charlie Melançon (Democratic) Uncontested
Louisiana 4	R+7	Jim McCrery	Republican	1988	Incumbent retired. Republican hold.	▌ ✓ John Fleming (Republican) 48.1%; ▌Paul Carmouche (Democratic) 47.7%; ▌Chester Kelly (Independent) 3.5%; ▌Gerard Bowen (Independent) 0.7%
Louisiana 5	R+10	Rodney Alexander	Republican	2002 (Note: Alexander was first elected as a Democrat. He became a Republican in August 2004.)	Incumbent re-elected.	▌ ✓ Rodney Alexander (Republican) Uncontested
Louisiana 6	R+7	Don Cazayoux	Democratic	May 3, 2008 (special)	Incumbent lost re-election. Republican gain.	▌ ✓ Bill Cassidy (Republican) 48.1%; ▌Don Cazayoux (Democratic) 40.3%; ▌Michael L. Jackson (Ind. Democratic) 11.6%
Louisiana 7	R+7	Charles Boustany	Republican	2004	Incumbent re-elected.	▌ ✓ Charles Boustany (Republican) 61.9%; ▌Don Cravins Jr. (Democratic) 34.3%; ▌Peter Vidrine (Constitution) 3.8%

== Maine ==
District	CPVI	Incumbent	Party	First elected	Results	Candidates
Maine 1	D+6	Tom Allen	Democratic	1996	Incumbent retired to run for U.S. Senator. Democratic hold.	▌ ✓ Chellie Pingree (Democratic) 54.9%; ▌Charlie Summers (Republican) 45.1%
Maine 2	D+3	Mike Michaud	Democratic	2002	Incumbent re-elected.	▌ ✓ Mike Michaud (Democratic) 67.4%; ▌John Frary (Republican) 32.6%

== Maryland ==
District	CPVI	Incumbent	Party	First elected	Results	Candidates
Maryland 1	R+10	Wayne Gilchrest	Republican	1990	Incumbent lost renomination. Democratic gain.	▌ ✓ Frank Kratovil (Democratic) 49.1%; ▌Andy Harris (Republican) 48.3%; ▌Richard James Davis (Libertarian) 2.5%
Maryland 2	D+8	Dutch Ruppersberger	Democratic	2002	Incumbent re-elected.	▌ ✓ Dutch Ruppersberger (Democratic) 71.9%; ▌Richard Matthews (Republican) 24.8%; ▌Lorenzo Gaztanaga (Libertarian) 3.2%
Maryland 3	D+7	John Sarbanes	Democratic	2006	Incumbent re-elected.	▌ ✓ John Sarbanes (Democratic) 69.7%; ▌Tom Harris (Republican) 30.1%
Maryland 4	D+30	Donna Edwards	Democratic	June 17, 2008 (special)	Incumbent re-elected.	▌ ✓ Donna Edwards (Democratic) 85.8%; ▌Peter James (Republican) 12.9%; ▌Thibeaux Lincecum (Libertarian) 1.1%
Maryland 5	D+9	Steny Hoyer	Democratic	1981 (special)	Incumbent re-elected.	▌ ✓ Steny Hoyer (Democratic) 73.6%; ▌Collins Bailey (Republican) 24.0%; ▌Darlene H. Nicholas (Libertarian) 2.3%
Maryland 6	R+13	Roscoe Bartlett	Republican	1992	Incumbent re-elected.	▌ ✓ Roscoe Bartlett (Republican) 57.8%; ▌Jennifer Dougherty (Democratic) 38.8%; ▌Gary Hoover (Libertarian) 3.3%
Maryland 7	D+25	Elijah Cummings	Democratic	1996	Incumbent re-elected.	▌ ✓ Elijah Cummings (Democratic) 79.5%; ▌Michael Hargadon (Republican) 18.6%; ▌Ronald M. Owens-Bey (Libertarian) 1.8%
Maryland 8	D+20	Chris Van Hollen	Democratic	2002	Incumbent re-elected.	▌ ✓ Chris Van Hollen (Democratic) 75.1%; ▌Steve Hudson (Republican) 21.7%; ▌Gordon Clark (Green) 2.2%; ▌Ian Thomas (Libertarian) 0.8%

== Massachusetts ==
District	CPVI	Incumbent	Party	First elected	Results	Candidates
Massachusetts 1	D+15	John Olver	Democratic	1991 (special)	Incumbent re-elected.	▌ ✓ John Olver (Democratic) 72.8%; ▌Nate Bech (Republican) 27.0%
Massachusetts 2	D+13	Richard Neal	Democratic	1988	Incumbent re-elected.	▌ ✓ Richard Neal (Democratic) Uncontested
Massachusetts 3	D+13	Jim McGovern	Democratic	1996	Incumbent re-elected.	▌ ✓ Jim McGovern (Democratic) Uncontested
Massachusetts 4	D+19	Barney Frank	Democratic	1980	Incumbent re-elected.	▌ ✓ Barney Frank (Democratic) 68.0%; ▌Earl Sholley (Republican) 25.3%; ▌Susan Allen (Independent) 6.6%
Massachusetts 5	D+11	Niki Tsongas	Democratic	2007 (special)	Incumbent re-elected.	▌ ✓ Niki Tsongas (Democratic) Uncontested
Massachusetts 6	D+11	John F. Tierney	Democratic	1996	Incumbent re-elected.	▌ ✓ John F. Tierney (Democratic) 70.4%; ▌Richard Baker (Republican) 29.5%
Massachusetts 7	D+19	Ed Markey	Democratic	1976	Incumbent re-elected.	▌ ✓ Ed Markey (Democratic) 75.6%; ▌John Cunningham (Republican) 24.2%
Massachusetts 8	D+33	Mike Capuano	Democratic	1998	Incumbent re-elected.	▌ ✓ Mike Capuano (Democratic) Uncontested
Massachusetts 9	D+15	Stephen Lynch	Democratic	2001 (special)	Incumbent re-elected.	▌ ✓ Stephen Lynch (Democratic) Uncontested
Massachusetts 10	D+9	Bill Delahunt	Democratic	1996	Incumbent re-elected.	▌ ✓ Bill Delahunt (Democratic) Uncontested

== Michigan ==
District	CPVI	Incumbent	Party	First elected	Results	Candidates
Michigan 1	R+2	Bart Stupak	Democratic	1992	Incumbent re-elected.	▌ ✓ Bart Stupak (Democratic) 65.0%; ▌Tom Casperson (Republican) 32.7; ▌Jean Marie Treacy (Green) 0.8%; ▌Dan Grow (Libertarian) 0.8%; ▌Joshua Warren (US Taxpayers) 0.6%
Michigan 2	R+9	Pete Hoekstra	Republican	1992	Incumbent re-elected.	▌ ✓ Pete Hoekstra (Republican) 62.4%; ▌Fred Johnson (Democratic) 34.8%; ▌Dan Johnson (Libertarian) 1.6%; ▌Ronald Graeser (US Taxpayers) 1.2%
Michigan 3	R+9	Vern Ehlers	Republican	1993 (special)	Incumbent re-elected.	▌ ✓ Vern Ehlers (Republican) 61.1%; ▌Henry Sanchez (Democratic) 35.4%; ▌Erwin Haas (Libertarian) 3.4%
Michigan 4	R+4	Dave Camp	Republican	1990	Incumbent re-elected.	▌ ✓ Dave Camp (Republican) 61.9%; ▌Andrew Concannon (Democratic) 35.7%; ▌John Emerick (US Taxpayers) 1.2%; ▌Allitta Hren (Libertarian) 1.1%
Michigan 5	D+12	Dale Kildee	Democratic	1976	Incumbent re-elected.	▌ ✓ Dale Kildee (Democratic) 70.4%; ▌Matt Sawicki (Republican) 27.0%; ▌Leonard Schwartz (Libertarian) 1.4%; ▌Ken Mathenia (Green) 1.3%
Michigan 6	R+2	Fred Upton	Republican	1986	Incumbent re-elected.	▌ ✓ Fred Upton (Republican) 58.9%; ▌Don Cooney (Democratic) 38.6%; ▌Greg Merle (Libertarian) 1.5%; ▌Edward Pinkney (Green) 1.1%
Michigan 7	R+2	Tim Walberg	Republican	2006	Incumbent lost re-election. Democratic gain.	▌ ✓ Mark Schauer (Democratic) 48.8%; ▌Tim Walberg (Republican) 46.5%; ▌Lynn Meadows (Green) 3.0%; ▌Ken Proctor (Libertarian) 1.8%
Michigan 8	R+2	Mike Rogers	Republican	2000	Incumbent re-elected.	▌ ✓ Mike Rogers (Republican) 56.5%; ▌Robert D. Alexander (Democratic) 40.2%; ▌Will Tyler White (Libertarian) 1.2%; ▌Aaron Stuttman (Green) 1.1%; ▌George Zimmer (US Taxpayers) 1.0%
Michigan 9	Even	Joe Knollenberg	Republican	1992	Incumbent lost re-election. Democratic gain.	▌ ✓ Gary Peters (Democratic) 52.1%; ▌Joe Knollenberg (Republican) 42.6%; ▌Jack Kevorkian (Independent) 2.6%; ▌Adam Goodman (Libertarian) 1.4%; ▌Doug Campbell (Green) 1.4%
Michigan 10	R+4	Candice Miller	Republican	2002	Incumbent re-elected.	▌ ✓ Candice Miller (Republican) 66.3%; ▌Robert Denison (Democratic) 31.2%; ▌Neil Stephenson (Libertarian) 1.3%; ▌Candace Caveny (Green) 1.2%
Michigan 11	R+1	Thaddeus McCotter	Republican	2002	Incumbent re-elected.	▌ ✓ Thaddeus McCotter (Republican) 51.4%; ▌Joseph Larkin (Democratic) 45.4%; ▌John Tatar (Libertarian) 1.7%; ▌Erik Shelley (Green) 1.5%
Michigan 12	D+13	Sander Levin	Democratic	1982	Incumbent re-elected.	▌ ✓ Sander Levin (Democratic) 72.1%; ▌Bert Copple (Republican) 23.9%; ▌John Vico (Libertarian) 1.5%; ▌Les Townsend (US Taxpayers) 1.3%; ▌Bill Opalicky (Green) 1.2%
Michigan 13	D+32	Carolyn Cheeks Kilpatrick	Democratic	1996	Incumbent re-elected.	▌ ✓ Carolyn Cheeks Kilpatrick (Democratic) 74.1%; ▌Edward Gubics (Republican) 19.1%; ▌George Corsetti (Green) 4.2%; ▌Gregory Creswell (Libertarian) 2.6%
Michigan 14	D+33	John Conyers	Democratic	1964	Incumbent re-elected.	▌ ✓ John Conyers (Democratic) 92.4%; ▌Rick Secula (Libertarian) 4.4%; ▌Clyde Shabazz (Green) 3.2%
Michigan 15	D+13	John Dingell	Democratic	1955 (special)	Incumbent re-elected.	▌ ✓ John Dingell (Democratic) 70.7%; ▌John Lynch (Republican) 25.0%; ▌Aimee Smith (Green) 2.2%; ▌Greg Stempfle (Libertarian) 1.2%; ▌James Wagner (US Taxpayers) 1.0%

== Minnesota ==
District	CPVI	Incumbent	Party	First elected	Results	Candidates
Minnesota 1	R+1	Tim Walz	DFL	2006	Incumbent re-elected.	▌ ✓ Tim Walz (DFL) 62.5%; ▌Brian Davis (Republican) 32.9%; ▌Gregory Mikkelson (Independence) 4.5%
Minnesota 2	R+3	John Kline	Republican	2002	Incumbent re-elected.	▌ ✓ John Kline (Republican) 57.3%; ▌Steve Sarvi (DFL) 42.6%
Minnesota 3	R+1	Jim Ramstad	Republican	1990	Incumbent retired. Republican hold.	▌ ✓ Erik Paulsen (Republican) 48.5%; ▌Ashwin Madia (DFL) 40.9%; ▌David Dillon (Independence) 10.6%
Minnesota 4	D+13	Betty McCollum	DFL	2000	Incumbent re-elected.	▌ ✓ Betty McCollum (DFL) 68.4%; ▌Ed Matthews (Republican) 31.3%
Minnesota 5	D+21	Keith Ellison	DFL	2006	Incumbent re-elected.	▌ ✓ Keith Ellison (DFL) 70.9%; ▌Barb Davis White (Republican) 22.0%; ▌Bill McGaughey (Independence) 6.9%
Minnesota 6	R+5	Michele Bachmann	Republican	2006	Incumbent re-elected.	▌ ✓ Michele Bachmann (Republican) 46.4%; ▌Elwyn Tinklenberg (DFL) 43.4%; ▌Bob Anderson (Independence) 10.0%
Minnesota 7	R+6	Collin Peterson	DFL	1990	Incumbent re-elected.	▌ ✓ Collin Peterson (DFL) 72.2%; ▌Glen Menze (Republican) 27.7%
Minnesota 8	D+4	Jim Oberstar	DFL	1974	Incumbent re-elected.	▌ ✓ Jim Oberstar (DFL) 67.7%; ▌Michael Cummins (Republican) 32.2%

== Mississippi ==
District	CPVI	Incumbent	Party	First elected	Results	Candidates
Mississippi 1	R+10	Travis Childers	Democratic	May 13, 2008 (special)	Incumbent re-elected.	▌ ✓ Travis Childers (Democratic) 54.5%; ▌Greg Davis (Republican) 43.9%; ▌Wally Pang (Independent) 1.1%; ▌John Wages Jr. (Green) 0.6%
Mississippi 2	D+10	Bennie Thompson	Democratic	1993 (special)	Incumbent re-elected.	▌ ✓ Bennie Thompson (Democratic) 69.1%; ▌Richard Cook (Republican) 30.9%
Mississippi 3	R+14	Chip Pickering	Republican	1996	Incumbent retired. Republican hold.	▌ ✓ Gregg Harper (Republican) 62.5%; ▌Joel Gill (Democratic) 37.5%
Mississippi 4	R+16	Gene Taylor	Democratic	1989 (special)	Incumbent re-elected.	▌ ✓ Gene Taylor (Democratic) 74.5%; ▌John McCay (Republican) 25.5%

== Missouri ==
District	CPVI	Incumbent	Party	First elected	Results	Candidates
Missouri 1	D+26	Lacy Clay	Democratic	2000	Incumbent re-elected.	▌ ✓ Lacy Clay (Democratic) 86.9%; ▌Robb Cunningham (Libertarian) 13.1%
Missouri 2	R+9	Todd Akin	Republican	2000	Incumbent re-elected.	▌ ✓ Todd Akin (Republican) 62.3%; ▌Bill Haas (Democratic) 35.4%; ▌Thomas Knapp (Libertarian) 2.3%
Missouri 3	D+8	Russ Carnahan	Democratic	2004	Incumbent re-elected.	▌ ✓ Russ Carnahan (Democratic) 66.4%; ▌Chris Sander (Republican) 30.4%; ▌Kevin Babcock (Libertarian) 1.8%; ▌Cindy Redburn (Constitution) 1.4%
Missouri 4	R+11	Ike Skelton	Democratic	1976	Incumbent re-elected.	▌ ✓ Ike Skelton (Democratic) 65.9%; ▌Jeff Parnell (Republican) 34.1%
Missouri 5	D+12	Emanuel Cleaver	Democratic	2004	Incumbent re-elected.	▌ ✓ Emanuel Cleaver (Democratic) 64.4%; ▌Jacob Turk (Republican) 35.6%
Missouri 6	R+5	Sam Graves	Republican	2000	Incumbent re-elected.	▌ ✓ Sam Graves (Republican) 59.4%; ▌Kay Barnes (Democratic) 36.9%; ▌Dave Browning (Libertarian) 3.7%
Missouri 7	R+14	Roy Blunt	Republican	1996	Incumbent re-elected.	▌ ✓ Roy Blunt (Republican) 67.8%; ▌Richard Monroe (Democratic) 28.1%; ▌Kevin Craig (Libertarian) 2.2%; ▌Travis Maddox (Constitution) 1.9%
Missouri 8	R+11	Jo Ann Emerson	Republican	1996	Incumbent re-elected.	▌ ✓ Jo Ann Emerson (Republican) 71.4%; ▌Joe Allen (Democratic) 26.2%; ▌Branden McCullough (Libertarian) 1.6%; ▌Richard Smith (Constitution) 0.8%
Missouri 9	R+7	Kenny Hulshof	Republican	1996	Incumbent retired to run for Governor. Republican hold.	▌ ✓ Blaine Luetkemeyer (Republican) 50.0%; ▌Judy Baker (Democratic) 47.5%; ▌Tamara Millay (Libertarian) 2.5%

== Montana ==
District	CPVI	Incumbent	Party	First elected	Results	Candidates
Montana at-large	R+11	Denny Rehberg	Republican	2000	Incumbent re-elected.	▌ ✓ Denny Rehberg (Republican) 64.2%; ▌John Driscoll (Democratic) 32.4%; ▌Mike Fellows (Libertarian) 3.4%

== Nebraska ==
District	CPVI	Incumbent	Party	First elected	Results	Candidates
Nebraska 1	R+12	Jeff Fortenberry	Republican	2004	Incumbent re-elected.	▌ ✓ Jeff Fortenberry (Republican) 70.4%; ▌Max Yashirin (Democratic) 29.6%
Nebraska 2	R+9	Lee Terry	Republican	1998	Incumbent re-elected.	▌ ✓ Lee Terry (Republican) 51.9%; ▌Jim Esch (Democratic) 48.1%
Nebraska 3	R+24	Adrian Smith	Republican	2006	Incumbent re-elected.	▌ ✓ Adrian Smith (Republican) 76.9%; ▌Jay Stoddard (Democratic) 23.1%

== Nevada ==
District	CPVI	Incumbent	Party	First elected	Results	Candidates
Nevada 1	D+9	Shelley Berkley	Democratic	1998	Incumbent re-elected.	▌ ✓ Shelley Berkley (Democratic) 67.6%; ▌Kenneth Wegner (Republican) 28.4%; ▌Caren Alexander (Independent American) 2.0%; ▌Raymond Duensing (Libertarian) 2.0%
Nevada 2	R+8	Dean Heller	Republican	2006	Incumbent re-elected.	▌ ✓ Dean Heller (Republican) 51.8%; ▌Jill Derby (Democratic) 41.4%; ▌John Everhart (Independent American) 3.4%; ▌Sean Patrick Morse (Libertarian) 1.7%; ▌Craig Bergland (Green) 1.6%
Nevada 3	D+1	Jon Porter	Republican	2002	Incumbent lost re-election. Democratic gain.	▌ ✓ Dina Titus (Democratic) 47.4%; ▌Jon Porter (Republican) 42.3%; ▌Jeffrey Reeves (Independent) 4.3%; ▌Joseph Silvestri (Libertarian) 2.9%; ▌Floyd Fitzgibbons (Independent American) 2.0%; ▌Bob Gianquinta (Green) 1.1%

== New Hampshire ==
District	CPVI	Incumbent	Party	First elected	Results	Candidates
New Hampshire 1	Even	Carol Shea-Porter	Democratic	2006	Incumbent re-elected.	▌ ✓ Carol Shea-Porter (Democratic) 51.7%; ▌Jeb Bradley (Republican) 45.8%; ▌Robert Kingsbury (Libertarian) 2.4%
New Hampshire 2	D+3	Paul Hodes	Democratic	2006	Incumbent re-elected.	▌ ✓ Paul Hodes (Democratic) 56.4%; ▌Jennifer Horn (Republican) 41.4%; ▌Chester Lapointe II (Libertarian) 2.1%

== New Jersey ==
District	CPVI	Incumbent	Party	First elected	Results	Candidates
New Jersey 1	D+14	Rob Andrews	Democratic	1990	Incumbent re-elected. (Note: Andrews originally retired to challenge U.S. Senator Frank Lautenberg in the Democratic primary, and his wife, Camille Andrews, won the Democratic primary to succeed him. After Andrews lost the Senate primary, his wife dropped out of the election, and he was named as the Democratic nominee for the general election.)	▌ ✓ Rob Andrews (Democratic) 72.4%; ▌Dale Glading (Republican) 26.0%; ▌Matthew Thieke (Green) 0.7%; ▌Margaret Chapman (Independent) 0.4%; ▌Everitt Williams (Independent) 0.3%; ▌Alvin Lindsay (Independent) 0.2%
New Jersey 2	D+4	Frank LoBiondo	Republican	1994	Incumbent re-elected.	▌ ✓ Frank LoBiondo (Republican) 59.1%; ▌David Kurkowski (Democratic) 39.1%; ▌Jason Grover (Green) 0.6%; ▌Peter Boyce (Constitution) 0.5%; ▌Gary Stein (Independent) 0.5%; ▌Constantino Rozzo (Socialist) 0.2%
New Jersey 3	D+3	Jim Saxton	Republican	1984	Incumbent retired. Democratic gain.	▌ ✓ John Adler (Democratic) 52.1%; ▌Chris Myers (Republican) 47.9%
New Jersey 4	R+1	Chris Smith	Republican	1980	Incumbent re-elected.	▌ ✓ Chris Smith (Republican) 66.2%; ▌Joshua Zeitz (Democratic) 32.6%; ▌Steven Welzer (Green) 1.2%
New Jersey 5	D+4	Scott Garrett	Republican	2000	Incumbent re-elected.	▌ ✓ Scott Garrett (Republican) 55.9%; ▌Dennis Shulman (Democratic) 42.4%; ▌Ed Fanning (Green) 1.7%
New Jersey 6	D+12	Frank Pallone	Democratic	1988	Incumbent re-elected.	▌ ✓ Frank Pallone (Democratic) 66.9%; ▌Robert McLeod (Republican) 31.6%; ▌Herbert Tarbous (Independent) 1.4%
New Jersey 7	R+1	Mike Ferguson	Republican	2000	Incumbent retired. Republican hold.	▌ ✓ Leonard Lance (Republican) 50.2%; ▌Linda Stender (Democratic) 42.2%; ▌Michael Hsing (Independent) 5.6%; ▌Dean Greco (Independent) 1.1%; ▌Thomas Abrams (Independent) 0.9%
New Jersey 8	D+12	Bill Pascrell	Democratic	1996	Incumbent re-elected.	▌ ✓ Bill Pascrell (Democratic) 71.1%; ▌Rollie Straten (Republican) 28.2%; ▌Derek DeMarco (Libertarian) 0.7%
New Jersey 9	D+13	Steve Rothman	Democratic	1996	Incumbent re-elected.	▌ ✓ Steve Rothman (Democratic) 69.5%; ▌Vince Micco (Republican) 31.0%; ▌Michael Perrone (Independent) 0.5%
New Jersey 10	D+34	Donald M. Payne	Democratic	1988	Incumbent re-elected.	▌ ✓ Donald M. Payne (Democratic) 98.9%; ▌Michael Taber (Socialist Workers) 1.1%
New Jersey 11	R+6	Rodney Frelinghuysen	Republican	1994	Incumbent re-elected.	▌ ✓ Rodney Frelinghuysen (Republican) 61.8%; ▌Tom Wyka (Democratic) 37.0%; ▌Chandler Tedholm (Independent) 1.2%
New Jersey 12	D+8	Rush Holt Jr.	Democratic	1998	Incumbent re-elected.	▌ ✓ Rush Holt Jr. (Democratic) 63.1%; ▌Alan Bateman (Republican) 35.3%; ▌David Corsi (Independent) 1.6%
New Jersey 13	D+23	Albio Sires	Democratic	2006	Incumbent re-elected.	▌ ✓ Albio Sires (Democratic) 75.4%; ▌Joseph Turula (Republican) 21.7%; ▌Julio Fernandez (Independent) 2.3%; ▌Louis Vernotico (Independent) 0.6%

== New Mexico ==
District	CPVI	Incumbent	Party	First elected	Results	Candidates
New Mexico 1	D+2	Heather Wilson	Republican	1998	Incumbent retired to run for U.S. Senator. Democratic gain.	▌ ✓ Martin Heinrich (Democratic) 55.7%; ▌Darren White (Republican) 44.3%
New Mexico 2	R+6	Steve Pearce	Republican	2002	Incumbent retired to run for U.S. Senator. Democratic gain.	▌ ✓ Harry Teague (Democratic) 56.0%; ▌Edward Tinsley (Republican) 44.0%
New Mexico 3	D+6	Tom Udall	Democratic	1998	Incumbent retired to run for U.S. Senator. Democratic hold.	▌ ✓ Ben Ray Luján (Democratic) 56.7%; ▌Daniel East (Republican) 30.5%; ▌Carol Miller (Independent) 12.8%

== New York ==
District	CPVI	Incumbent	Party	First elected	Results	Candidates
New York 1	D+3	Tim Bishop	Democratic	2002	Incumbent re-elected.	▌ ✓ Tim Bishop (Democratic) 58.4%; ▌Lee Zeldin (Republican) 41.6%
New York 2	D+8	Steve Israel	Democratic	2000	Incumbent re-elected.	▌ ✓ Steve Israel (Democratic) 66.9%; ▌Frank Stalzer (Republican) 33.1%
New York 3	D+2	Peter King	Republican	1992	Incumbent re-elected.	▌ ✓ Peter King (Republican) 63.9%; ▌Graham Long (Democratic) 36.1%
New York 4	D+9	Carolyn McCarthy	Democratic	1996	Incumbent re-elected.	▌ ✓ Carolyn McCarthy (Democratic) 64.0%; ▌Jack Martins (Republican) 36.0%
New York 5	D+18	Gary Ackerman	Democratic	1983 (special)	Incumbent re-elected.	▌ ✓ Gary Ackerman (Democratic) 70.7%; ▌Elizabeth Berney (Republican) 27.4%; ▌Jun Policarpio (Conservative) 1.9%
New York 6	D+38	Gregory Meeks	Democratic	1998	Incumbent re-elected.	▌ ✓ Gregory Meeks (Democratic) Uncontested
New York 7	D+28	Joe Crowley	Democratic	1998	Incumbent re-elected.	▌ ✓ Joe Crowley (Democratic) 84.7%; ▌William Britt (Republican) 15.3%
New York 8	D+28	Jerry Nadler	Democratic	1992	Incumbent re-elected.	▌ ✓ Jerry Nadler (Democratic) 80.5%; ▌Grace Lin (Republican) 19.5%
New York 9	D+14	Anthony Weiner	Democratic	1998	Incumbent re-elected.	▌ ✓ Anthony Weiner (Democratic) 93.3%; ▌Alfred F. Donohue Jr. (Conservative) 6.7%
New York 10	D+41	Edolphus Towns	Democratic	1982	Incumbent re-elected.	▌ ✓ Edolphus Towns (Democratic) 94.2%; ▌Salvatore Grupico (Republican) 5.8%
New York 11	D+40	Yvette Clarke	Democratic	2006	Incumbent re-elected.	▌ ✓ Yvette Clarke (Democratic) 92.8%; ▌Hugh Carr (Republican) 6.4%; ▌Cartrell Gore (Conservative) 0.8%
New York 12	D+34	Nydia Velázquez	Democratic	1992	Incumbent re-elected.	▌ ✓ Nydia Velázquez (Democratic) 90.0%; ▌Allan Romaguera (Republican) 10.0%
New York 13	D+1	Vito Fossella	Republican	1997 (special)	Incumbent retired. Democratic gain.	▌ ✓ Michael McMahon (Democratic) 60.9%; ▌Robert Straniere (Republican) 33.3%; ▌Timothy Cochrane (Conservative) 3.1%; ▌Carmine Morano (Independence) 2.7%
New York 14	D+26	Carolyn Maloney	Democratic	1992	Incumbent re-elected.	▌ ✓ Carolyn Maloney (Democratic) 79.8%; ▌Robert Heim (Republican) 19.0%; ▌Isaiah Matos (Libertarian) 1.2%
New York 15	D+43	Charles Rangel	Democratic	1970	Incumbent re-elected.	▌ ✓ Charles Rangel (Democratic) 89.2%; ▌Edward Daniels (Republican) 7.9%; ▌Craig Schley (Independent) 1.9%; ▌Martin Koppel (Socialist Workers) 1.1%
New York 16	D+43	José E. Serrano	Democratic	1990	Incumbent re-elected.	▌ ✓ José E. Serrano (Democratic) 96.6%; ▌Ali Mohamed (Republican) 3.4%
New York 17	D+21	Eliot Engel	Democratic	1988	Incumbent re-elected.	▌ ✓ Eliot Engel (Democratic) 79.9%; ▌Robert Goodman (Republican) 20.1%
New York 18	D+10	Nita Lowey	Democratic	1988	Incumbent re-elected.	▌ ✓ Nita Lowey (Democratic) 68.5%; ▌James Russell (Republican) 31.5%
New York 19	R+1	John Hall	Democratic	2006	Incumbent re-elected.	▌ ✓ John Hall (Democratic) 58.7%; ▌Kieran Lalor (Republican) 41.3%
New York 20	R+3	Kirsten Gillibrand	Democratic	2006	Incumbent re-elected.	▌ ✓ Kirsten Gillibrand (Democratic) 62.1%; ▌Sandy Treadwell (Republican) 37.9%
New York 21	D+9	Michael McNulty	Democratic	1988	Incumbent retired. Democratic hold.	▌ ✓ Paul Tonko (Democratic) 62.1%; ▌James Buhrmaster (Republican) 35.0%; ▌Phillip Steck (Independence) 2.9%
New York 22	D+6	Maurice Hinchey	Democratic	1992	Incumbent re-elected.	▌ ✓ Maurice Hinchey (Democratic) 66.3%; ▌George Phillips (Republican) 33.7%
New York 23	Even	John M. McHugh	Republican	1992	Incumbent re-elected.	▌ ✓ John M. McHugh (Republican) 65.3%; ▌Michael Oot (Democratic) 34.7%
New York 24	R+1	Mike Arcuri	Democratic	2006	Incumbent re-elected.	▌ ✓ Mike Arcuri (Democratic) 52.0%; ▌Richard Hanna (Republican) 48.0%
New York 25	D+3	James T. Walsh	Republican	1988	Incumbent retired. Democratic gain.	▌ ✓ Dan Maffei (Democratic) 54.8%; ▌Dale Sweetland (Republican) 41.9%; ▌Howie Hawkins (Green) 3.3%
New York 26	R+3	Thomas M. Reynolds	Republican	1998	Incumbent retired. Republican hold.	▌ ✓ Chris Lee (Republican) 55.0%; ▌Alice Kryzan (Democratic) 40.5%; ▌Jon Powers (Working Families) 4.5%
New York 27	D+7	Brian Higgins	Democratic	2004	Incumbent re-elected.	▌ ✓ Brian Higgins (Democratic) 74.4%; ▌Daniel Humiston (Republican) 22.6%; ▌Harold Schroeder (Conservative) 3.0%
New York 28	D+15	Louise Slaughter	Democratic	1986	Incumbent re-elected.	▌ ✓ Louise Slaughter (Democratic) 78.0%; ▌David Crimmen (Republican) 22.0%
New York 29	R+5	Randy Kuhl	Republican	2004	Incumbent lost re-election. Democratic gain.	▌ ✓ Eric Massa (Democratic) 51.0%; ▌Randy Kuhl (Republican) 49.0%

== North Carolina ==
District	CPVI	Incumbent	Party	First elected	Results	Candidates
North Carolina 1	D+9	G. K. Butterfield	Democratic	2004	Incumbent re-elected.	▌ ✓ G. K. Butterfield (Democratic) 70.3%; ▌Dean Stephens (Republican) 29.7%
North Carolina 2	R+3	Bob Etheridge	Democratic	1996	Incumbent re-elected.	▌ ✓ Bob Etheridge (Democratic) 66.9%; ▌Dan Mansell (Republican) 31.3%; ▌Will Adkins (Libertarian) 1.8%
North Carolina 3	R+15	Walter B. Jones Jr.	Republican	1994	Incumbent re-elected.	▌ ✓ Walter B. Jones Jr. (Republican) 65.9%; ▌Craig Weber (Democratic) 34.1%
North Carolina 4	D+6	David Price	Democratic	1986; 1994 (defeated); 1996	Incumbent re-elected.	▌ ✓ David Price (Democratic) 63.3%
North Carolina 5	R+15	Virginia Foxx	Republican	2004	Incumbent re-elected.	▌ ✓ Virginia Foxx (Republican) 58.4%; ▌Roy Carter (Democratic) 41.6%
North Carolina 6	R+17	Howard Coble	Republican	1984	Incumbent re-elected.	▌ ✓ Howard Coble (Republican) 67.0%; ▌Teresa Sue Bratton (Democratic) 33.0%
North Carolina 7	R+3	Mike McIntyre	Democratic	1996	Incumbent re-elected.	▌ ✓ Mike McIntyre (Democratic) 68.8%; ▌Will Breazeale (Republican) 31.2%
North Carolina 8	R+3	Robin Hayes	Republican	1998	Incumbent lost re-election. Democratic gain.	▌ ✓ Larry Kissell (Democratic) 55.4%; ▌Robin Hayes (Republican) 44.6%
North Carolina 9	R+12	Sue Myrick	Republican	1994	Incumbent re-elected.	▌ ✓ Sue Myrick (Republican) 62.4%; ▌Harry Taylor (Democratic) 35.9%; ▌Andy Grum (Libertarian) 1.7%
North Carolina 10	R+15	Patrick McHenry	Republican	2004	Incumbent re-elected.	▌ ✓ Patrick McHenry (Republican) 57.6%; ▌Daniel Johnson (Democratic) 42.4%
North Carolina 11	R+7	Heath Shuler	Democratic	2006	Incumbent re-elected.	▌ ✓ Heath Shuler (Democratic) 62.0%; ▌Carl Mumpower (Republican) 35.8%; ▌Keith Smith (Libertarian) 2.2%
North Carolina 12	D+11	Mel Watt	Democratic	1992	Incumbent re-elected.	▌ ✓ Mel Watt (Democratic) 71.6%; ▌Ty Cobb (Republican) 28.4%
North Carolina 13	D+2	Brad Miller	Democratic	2002	Incumbent re-elected.	▌ ✓ Brad Miller (Democratic) 65.9%; ▌Hugh Webster (Republican) 34.1%

== North Dakota ==
District	CPVI	Incumbent	Party	First elected	Results	Candidates
North Dakota at-large	R+13	Earl Pomeroy	Democratic-NPL	1992	Incumbent re-elected.	▌ ✓ Earl Pomeroy (Democratic–NPL) 62.0%; ▌Duane Sand (Republican) 38.0%

== Ohio ==
District	CPVI	Incumbent	Party	First elected	Results	Candidates
Ohio 1	R+1	Steve Chabot	Republican	1994	Incumbent lost re-election. Democratic gain.	▌ ✓ Steve Driehaus (Democratic) 52.4%; ▌Steve Chabot (Republican) 47.5%
Ohio 2	R+13	Jean Schmidt	Republican	2005 (special)	Incumbent re-elected.	▌ ✓ Jean Schmidt (Republican) 44.8%; ▌Victoria Wulsin (Democratic) 37.5%; ▌David Krikorian (Independent) 17.7%
Ohio 3	R+3	Mike Turner	Republican	2002	Incumbent re-elected.	▌ ✓ Mike Turner (Republican) 63.3%; ▌Jane Mitakides (Democratic) 36.7%
Ohio 4	R+14	Jim Jordan	Republican	2006	Incumbent re-elected.	▌ ✓ Jim Jordan (Republican) 65.2%; ▌Mike Carroll (Democratic) 34.8%
Ohio 5	R+10	Bob Latta	Republican	2007 (special)	Incumbent re-elected.	▌ ✓ Bob Latta (Republican) 64.1%; ▌George Mays (Democratic) 35.9%
Ohio 6	Even	Charlie Wilson	Democratic	2006	Incumbent re-elected.	▌ ✓ Charlie Wilson (Democratic) 62.3%; ▌Dick Stobbs (Republican) 32.8%; ▌Dennis Spisak (Green) 4.9%
Ohio 7	R+6	Dave Hobson	Republican	1990	Incumbent retired. Republican hold.	▌ ✓ Steve Austria (Republican) 58.2%; ▌Sharen Neuhardt (Democratic) 41.8%
Ohio 8	R+12	John Boehner	Republican	1990	Incumbent re-elected.	▌ ✓ John Boehner (Republican) 67.9%; ▌Nick von Stein (Democratic) 32.1%
Ohio 9	D+9	Marcy Kaptur	Democratic	1982	Incumbent re-elected.	▌ ✓ Marcy Kaptur (Democratic) 74.4%; ▌Bradley Leavitt (Republican) 25.6%
Ohio 10	D+8	Dennis Kucinich	Democratic	1996	Incumbent re-elected.	▌ ✓ Dennis Kucinich (Democratic) 57.0%; ▌Jim Trakas (Republican) 39.1%; ▌Paul Conroy (Libertarian) 3.9%
Ohio 11	D+33	Vacant			Stephanie Tubbs Jones (D) died August 20, 2008. Democratic hold. Successor was also elected the same day to finish the current term.	▌ ✓ Marcia Fudge (Democratic) 85.2%; ▌Thomas Pekarek (Republican) 14.7%
Ohio 12	R+1	Pat Tiberi	Republican	2000	Incumbent re-elected.	▌ ✓ Pat Tiberi (Republican) 54.8%; ▌David Robinson (Democratic) 42.2%; ▌Steven Linnabary (Libertarian) 3.0%
Ohio 13	D+6	Betty Sutton	Democratic	2006	Incumbent re-elected.	▌ ✓ Betty Sutton (Democratic) 64.5%; ▌David Potter (Republican) 35.4%
Ohio 14	R+2	Steve LaTourette	Republican	1994	Incumbent re-elected.	▌ ✓ Steve LaTourette (Republican) 58.3%; ▌William O'Neill (Democratic) 38.7%; ▌David Macko (Libertarian) 2.9%
Ohio 15	R+1	Deborah Pryce	Republican	1992	Incumbent retired. Democratic gain.	▌ ✓ Mary Jo Kilroy (Democratic) 45.9%; ▌Steve Stivers (Republican) 45.2%; ▌Mark Michael Noble (Libertarian) 4.6%; ▌Don Elijah Eckhart (Independent) 4.3%
Ohio 16	R+4	Ralph Regula	Republican	1972	Incumbent retired. Democratic gain.	▌ ✓ John Boccieri (Democratic) 55.4%; ▌Kirk Schuring (Republican) 44.6%
Ohio 17	D+14	Tim Ryan	Democratic	2002	Incumbent re-elected.	▌ ✓ Tim Ryan (Democratic) 78.2%; ▌Duane Grassell (Republican) 21.8%
Ohio 18	R+6	Zack Space	Democratic	2006	Incumbent re-elected.	▌ ✓ Zack Space (Democratic) 59.9%; ▌Fred Dailey (Republican) 40.1%

== Oklahoma ==
District	CPVI	Incumbent	Party	First elected	Results	Candidates
Oklahoma 1	R+13	John Sullivan	Republican	2002	Incumbent re-elected.	▌ ✓ John Sullivan (Republican) 66.2%; ▌Georgianna Oliver (Democratic) 33.8%
Oklahoma 2	R+5	Dan Boren	Democratic	2004	Incumbent re-elected.	▌ ✓ Dan Boren (Democratic) 70.5%; ▌Raymond Wickson (Republican) 29.5%
Oklahoma 3	R+18	Frank Lucas	Republican	1994	Incumbent re-elected.	▌ ✓ Frank Lucas (Republican) 69.7%; ▌Frankie Robbins (Democratic) 23.6%; ▌Forrest Michael (Independent) 6.7%
Oklahoma 4	R+13	Tom Cole	Republican	2002	Incumbent re-elected.	▌ ✓ Tom Cole (Republican) 66.0%; ▌Blake Cummings (Democratic) 29.2%; ▌David E. Joyce (Independent) 4.8%
Oklahoma 5	R+12	Mary Fallin	Republican	2006	Incumbent re-elected.	▌ ✓ Mary Fallin (Republican) 65.9%; ▌Stephen L. Perry (Democratic) 34.1%

== Oregon ==
District	CPVI	Incumbent	Party	First elected	Results	Candidates
Oregon 1	D+6	David Wu	Democratic	1998	Incumbent re-elected.	▌ ✓ David Wu (Democratic) 71.5%; ▌Joel Haugen (Independent) 17.5%; ▌Scott Semrau (Constitution) 4.3%; ▌H. Joe Tabor (Libertarian) 3.3%; ▌Chris Henry (Pacific Green) 2.1%
Oregon 2	R+11	Greg Walden	Republican	1998	Incumbent re-elected.	▌ ✓ Greg Walden (Republican) 69.5%; ▌Noah Lemas (Democratic) 25.8%; ▌Tristin Mock (Pacific Green) 2.8%; ▌Richard Hake (Constitution) 1.7%
Oregon 3	D+18	Earl Blumenauer	Democratic	1996	Incumbent re-elected.	▌ ✓ Earl Blumenauer (Democratic) 74.5%; ▌Delia Lopez (Republican) 20.8%; ▌Michael Meo (Pacific Green) 4.4%
Oregon 4	Even	Peter DeFazio	Democratic	1986	Incumbent re-elected.	▌ ✓ Peter DeFazio (Democratic) 82.3%; ▌Jaynee Germond (Constitution) 12.9%; ▌Mike Beilstein (Pacific Green) 3.9%
Oregon 5	D+1	Darlene Hooley	Democratic	1996	Incumbent retired. Democratic hold.	▌ ✓ Kurt Schrader (Democratic) 54.3%; ▌Mike Erickson (Republican) 38.3%; ▌Sean Bates (Independent) 2.0%; ▌Douglas Patterson (Constitution) 2.0%; ▌Alex Polikoff (Pacific Green) 1.6%; ▌Steve Milligan (Libertarian) 1.4%

== Pennsylvania ==
District	CPVI	Incumbent	Party	First elected	Results	Candidates
Pennsylvania 1	D+36	Bob Brady	Democratic	1998	Incumbent re-elected.	▌ ✓ Bob Brady (Democratic) 90.8%; ▌Mike Muhammad (Republican) 9.2%
Pennsylvania 2	D+39	Chaka Fattah	Democratic	1994	Incumbent re-elected.	▌ ✓ Chaka Fattah (Democratic) 88.9%; ▌Adam Lang (Republican) 11.1%
Pennsylvania 3	R+2	Phil English	Republican	1994	Incumbent lost re-election. Democratic gain.	▌ ✓ Kathy Dahlkemper (Democratic) 51.2%; ▌Phil English (Republican) 48.8%
Pennsylvania 4	R+3	Jason Altmire	Democratic	2006	Incumbent re-elected.	▌ ✓ Jason Altmire (Democratic) 55.9%; ▌Melissa Hart (Republican) 44.1%
Pennsylvania 5	R+10	John Peterson	Republican	1996	Incumbent retired. Republican hold.	▌ ✓ Glenn Thompson (Republican) 56.7%; ▌Mark McCracken (Democratic) 41.0%; ▌James Fryman (Libertarian) 2.2%
Pennsylvania 6	D+2	Jim Gerlach	Republican	2002	Incumbent re-elected.	▌ ✓ Jim Gerlach (Republican) 52.1%; ▌Bob Roggio (Democratic) 47.9%
Pennsylvania 7	D+4	Joe Sestak	Democratic	2006	Incumbent re-elected.	▌ ✓ Joe Sestak (Democratic) 59.6%; ▌Craig Williams (Republican) 40.4%
Pennsylvania 8	D+3	Patrick Murphy	Democratic	2006	Incumbent re-elected.	▌ ✓ Patrick Murphy (Democratic) 56.8%; ▌Tom Manion (Republican) 41.6%; ▌Tom Lingenfelter (Independent) 1.6%
Pennsylvania 9	R+15	Bill Shuster	Republican	2001 (special)	Incumbent re-elected.	▌ ✓ Bill Shuster (Republican) 63.9%; ▌Tony Barr (Democratic) 36.1%
Pennsylvania 10	R+8	Chris Carney	Democratic	2006	Incumbent re-elected.	▌ ✓ Chris Carney (Democratic) 56.3%; ▌Chris Hackett (Republican) 43.7%
Pennsylvania 11	D+5	Paul Kanjorski	Democratic	1984	Incumbent re-elected.	▌ ✓ Paul Kanjorski (Democratic) 51.6%; ▌Lou Barletta (Republican) 48.4%
Pennsylvania 12	D+5	John Murtha	Democratic	1974	Incumbent re-elected.	▌ ✓ John Murtha (Democratic) 57.9%; ▌William Russell (Republican) 42.1%
Pennsylvania 13	D+8	Allyson Schwartz	Democratic	2004	Incumbent re-elected.	▌ ✓ Allyson Schwartz (Democratic) 62.8%; ▌John McDermott (Constitution) 2.7%
Pennsylvania 14	D+22	Mike Doyle	Democratic	1994	Incumbent re-elected.	▌ ✓ Mike Doyle (Democratic) 91.3%; ▌Titus North (Green) 8.7%
Pennsylvania 15	D+2	Charlie Dent	Republican	2004	Incumbent re-elected.	▌ ✓ Charlie Dent (Republican) 58.6%; ▌Sam Bennett (Democratic) 41.4%
Pennsylvania 16	R+11	Joe Pitts	Republican	1996	Incumbent re-elected.	▌ ✓ Joe Pitts (Republican) 55.8%; ▌Bruce Slater (Democratic) 39.4%; ▌John Murphy (Independent) 3.9%; ▌Daniel Frank (Constitution) 0.9%
Pennsylvania 17	R+7	Tim Holden	Democratic	1992	Incumbent re-elected.	▌ ✓ Tim Holden (Democratic) 63.7%; ▌Toni Gilhooley (Republican) 36.3%
Pennsylvania 18	R+2	Tim Murphy	Republican	2002	Incumbent re-elected.	▌ ✓ Tim Murphy (Republican) 64.1%; ▌Steve O'Donnell (Democratic) 35.9%
Pennsylvania 19	R+12	Todd Platts	Republican	2000	Incumbent re-elected.	▌ ✓ Todd Platts (Republican) 66.6%; ▌Phil Avillo (Democratic) 33.4%

== Rhode Island ==
District	CPVI	Incumbent	Party	First elected	Results	Candidates
Rhode Island 1	D+16	Patrick J. Kennedy	Democratic	1994	Incumbent re-elected.	▌ ✓ Patrick J. Kennedy (Democratic) 68.6%; ▌Jonathan Scott (Republican) 24.3%; ▌Kenneth Capalbo (Independent) 7.1%
Rhode Island 2	D+13	Jim Langevin	Democratic	2000	Incumbent re-elected.	▌ ✓ Jim Langevin (Democratic) 70.1%; ▌Mark Zaccaria (Republican) 29.9%

== South Carolina ==
District	CPVI	Incumbent	Party	First elected	Results	Candidates
South Carolina 1	R+10	Henry Brown	Republican	2000	Incumbent re-elected.	▌ ✓ Henry Brown (Republican) 51.9%; ▌Linda Ketner (Democratic) 47.9%
South Carolina 2	R+9	Joe Wilson	Republican	2001 (special)	Incumbent re-elected.	▌ ✓ Joe Wilson (Republican) 53.7%; ▌Robert Miller (Democratic) 46.2%
South Carolina 3	R+14	Gresham Barrett	Republican	2002	Incumbent re-elected.	▌ ✓ Gresham Barrett (Republican) 64.7%; ▌Jane Ballard Dyer (Democratic) 35.2%
South Carolina 4	R+15	Bob Inglis	Republican	1992; 1998 (retired); 2004	Incumbent re-elected.	▌ ✓ Bob Inglis (Republican) 60.1%; ▌Paul Corden (Democratic) 36.9%; ▌C. Faye Walters (Green) 2.4%
South Carolina 5	R+6	John Spratt	Democratic	1982	Incumbent re-elected.	▌ ✓ John Spratt (Democratic) 61.6%; ▌Albert F. Spencer (Republican) 37.0%; ▌Frank Waggoner (Constitution) 1.3%
South Carolina 6	D+11	Jim Clyburn	Democratic	1992	Incumbent re-elected.	▌ ✓ Jim Clyburn (Democratic) 67.5%; ▌Nancy Harrelson (Republican) 32.5%

== South Dakota ==
District	CPVI	Incumbent	Party	First elected	Results	Candidates
South Dakota at-large	R+10	Stephanie Herseth Sandlin	Democratic	2004 (special)	Incumbent re-elected.	▌ ✓ Stephanie Herseth Sandlin (Democratic) 67.6%; ▌Chris Lien (Republican) 32.4%

== Tennessee ==
District	CPVI	Incumbent	Party	First elected	Results	Candidates
Tennessee 1	R+14	David Davis	Republican	2006	Incumbent lost renomination. Republican hold.	▌ ✓ Phil Roe (Republican) 71.8%; ▌Rob Russell (Democratic) 24.5%; ▌Joel Goodman (Independent) 1.7%; ▌James Reeves (Independent) 1.1%; ▌Thomas Owens (Independent) 0.8%
Tennessee 2	R+11	Jimmy Duncan	Republican	1998	Incumbent re-elected.	▌ ✓ Jimmy Duncan (Republican) 78.1%; ▌Bob Scott (Democratic) 21.9%
Tennessee 3	R+8	Zach Wamp	Republican	1994	Incumbent re-elected.	▌ ✓ Zach Wamp (Republican) 69.4%; ▌Doug Vandagriff (Democratic) 27.4%; ▌Jean Howard-Hill (Independent) 1.8%; ▌Ed Choate (Independent) 1.4%
Tennessee 4	R+3	Lincoln Davis	Democratic	2002	Incumbent re-elected.	▌ ✓ Lincoln Davis (Democratic) 58.8%; ▌Monty Lankford (Republican) 37.8%; ▌James Anthony Gray (Independent) 1.9%; ▌Kevin Ragsdale (Independent) 1.5%
Tennessee 5	D+6	Jim Cooper	Democratic	1982; 1994 (retired); 2002	Incumbent re-elected.	▌ ✓ Jim Cooper (Democratic) 65.9%; ▌Gerard Donovan (Republican) 31.0%; ▌Jon Jackson (Independent) 2.0%; ▌John Miglietta (Green) 1.2%
Tennessee 6	R+4	Bart Gordon	Democratic	1984	Incumbent re-elected.	▌ ✓ Bart Gordon (Democratic) 74.4%; ▌Chris Baker (Independent) 25.6%
Tennessee 7	R+10	Marsha Blackburn	Republican	2002	Incumbent re-elected.	▌ ✓ Marsha Blackburn (Republican) 68.6%; ▌Randy Morris (Democratic) 31.4%
Tennessee 8	Even	John Tanner	Democratic	1988	Incumbent re-elected.	▌ ✓ John Tanner (Democratic) Uncontested
Tennessee 9	D+16	Steve Cohen	Democratic	2006	Incumbent re-elected.	▌ ✓ Steve Cohen (Democratic) 87.9%; ▌Jake Ford (Independent) 4.9%; ▌Dewey Clark (Independent) 4.4%; ▌Mary Wright (Independent) 2.8%

== Texas ==
District	CPVI	Incumbent	Party	First elected	Results	Candidates
Texas 1	R+17	Louie Gohmert	Republican	2004	Incumbent re-elected.	▌ ✓ Louie Gohmert (Republican) 87.6%; ▌Roger Owen (Independent) 12.4%
Texas 2	R+12	Ted Poe	Republican	2004	Incumbent re-elected.	▌ ✓ Ted Poe (Republican) 88.9%; ▌Craig Wolfe (Libertarian) 11.1%
Texas 3	R+17	Sam Johnson	Republican	1991 (special)	Incumbent re-elected.	▌ ✓ Sam Johnson (Republican) 59.7%; ▌Tom Daley (Democratic) 38.0%; ▌Christopher J. Claytor (Libertarian) 2.2%
Texas 4	R+17	Ralph Hall	Republican	1980 (Note: Hall was first elected as a Democrat. He became a Republican in January 2004.)	Incumbent re-elected.	▌ ✓ Ralph Hall (Republican) 68.8%; ▌Glenn Melancon (Democratic) 29.3%; ▌Fred Annett (Libertarian) 1.9%
Texas 5	R+16	Jeb Hensarling	Republican	2002	Incumbent re-elected.	▌ ✓ Jeb Hensarling (Republican) 83.6%; ▌Ken Ashby (Libertarian) 16.4%
Texas 6	R+15	Joe Barton	Republican	1984	Incumbent re-elected.	▌ ✓ Joe Barton (Republican) 62.0%; ▌Ludwig Otto (Democratic) 35.6%; ▌Max Koch (Libertarian) 2.4%
Texas 7	R+16	John Culberson	Republican	2000	Incumbent re-elected.	▌ ✓ John Culberson (Republican) 55.9%; ▌Michael Skelly (Democratic) 42.4%; ▌Drew P. Parks (Libertarian) 1.7%
Texas 8	R+20	Kevin Brady	Republican	1996	Incumbent re-elected.	▌ ✓ Kevin Brady (Republican) 72.6%; ▌Kent Hargett (Democratic) 24.8%; ▌Brian Stevens (Libertarian) 2.7%
Texas 9	D+21	Al Green	Democratic	2004	Incumbent re-elected.	▌ ✓ Al Green (Democratic) 93.6%; ▌Brad Walters (Libertarian) 6.4%
Texas 10	R+13	Michael McCaul	Republican	2004	Incumbent re-elected.	▌ ✓ Michael McCaul (Republican) 53.9%; ▌Larry Joe Doherty (Democratic) 43.1%; ▌Matt Finkel (Libertarian) 3.0%
Texas 11	R+25	Mike Conaway	Republican	2004	Incumbent re-elected.	▌ ✓ Mike Conaway (Republican) 88.3%; ▌John Strohm (Libertarian) 11.7%
Texas 12	R+14	Kay Granger	Republican	1996	Incumbent re-elected.	▌ ✓ Kay Granger (Republican) 67.6%; ▌Tracey Smith (Democratic) 30.6%; ▌Shiloh Sidney Shambaugh (Libertarian) 1.8%
Texas 13	R+25	Mac Thornberry	Republican	1994	Incumbent re-elected.	▌ ✓ Mac Thornberry (Republican) 77.6%; ▌Roger Waun (Democratic) 22.4%
Texas 14	R+14	Ron Paul	Republican	1976 (special); 1976 (defeated); 1978; 1984 (retired); 1996	Incumbent re-elected.	▌ ✓ Ron Paul (Republican) Uncontested
Texas 15	D+3	Rubén Hinojosa	Democratic	1996	Incumbent re-elected.	▌ ✓ Rubén Hinojosa (Democratic) 65.7%; ▌Eddie Zamora (Republican) 31.9%; ▌Gricha Raether (Libertarian) 2.3%
Texas 16	D+9	Silvestre Reyes	Democratic	1996	Incumbent re-elected.	▌ ✓ Silvestre Reyes (Democratic) 82.1%; ▌Mette Baker (Libertarian) 10.3%; ▌Ben Mendoza (Independent) 7.6%
Texas 17	R+18	Chet Edwards	Democratic	1990	Incumbent re-elected.	▌ ✓ Chet Edwards (Democratic) 53.0%; ▌Rob Curnock (Republican) 45.5%; ▌Gardner Osborne (Libertarian) 1.5%
Texas 18	D+23	Sheila Jackson Lee	Democratic	1994	Incumbent re-elected.	▌ ✓ Sheila Jackson Lee (Democratic) 77.3%; ▌John Faulk (Republican) 20.3%; ▌Mike Taylor (Libertarian) 2.3%
Texas 19	R+25	Randy Neugebauer	Republican	2002	Incumbent re-elected.	▌ ✓ Randy Neugebauer (Republican) 72.4%; ▌Dwight Fullingim (Democratic) 24.9%; ▌Chip Peterson (Libertarian) 2.6%
Texas 20	D+8	Charlie González	Democratic	1998	Incumbent re-elected.	▌ ✓ Charlie González (Democratic) 71.9%; ▌Robert Litoff (Republican) 25.2%; ▌Michael Idrogo (Libertarian) 2.9%
Texas 21	R+16	Lamar Smith	Republican	1986	Incumbent re-elected.	▌ ✓ Lamar Smith (Republican) 80.0%; ▌James Arthur Strohm (Libertarian) 20.0%
Texas 22	R+15	Nick Lampson	Democratic	1996; 2004 (defeated); 2006	Incumbent lost re-election. Republican gain.	▌ ✓ Pete Olson (Republican) 52.4%; ▌Nick Lampson (Democratic) 45.4%; ▌John Wieder (Libertarian) 2.2%
Texas 23	R+4	Ciro Rodriguez	Democratic	1997 (special); 2004 (lost renomination); 2006	Incumbent re-elected.	▌ ✓ Ciro Rodriguez (Democratic) 55.8%; ▌Lyle Larson (Republican) 41.9%; ▌Lani Connolly (Libertarian) 2.3%
Texas 24	R+15	Kenny Marchant	Republican	2004	Incumbent re-elected.	▌ ✓ Kenny Marchant (Republican) 56.0%; ▌Tom Love (Democratic) 41.1%; ▌David Casey (Libertarian) 2.9%
Texas 25	D+1	Lloyd Doggett	Democratic	1994	Incumbent re-elected.	▌ ✓ Lloyd Doggett (Democratic) 65.8%; ▌George Morovich (Republican) 30.4%; ▌Jim Stutsman (Libertarian) 3.7%
Texas 26	R+12	Michael C. Burgess	Republican	2002	Incumbent re-elected.	▌ ✓ Michael C. Burgess (Republican) 60.2%; ▌Ken Leach (Democratic) 36.4%; ▌Stephanie Weiss (Libertarian) 3.4%
Texas 27	R+1	Solomon Ortiz	Democratic	1982	Incumbent re-elected.	▌ ✓ Solomon Ortiz (Democratic) 57.9%; ▌Willie Vaden (Republican) 38.4%; ▌Robert Powell (Libertarian) 3.7%
Texas 28	R+1	Henry Cuellar	Democratic	2004	Incumbent re-elected.	▌ ✓ Henry Cuellar (Democratic) 68.7%; ▌Jim Fish (Republican) 29.2%; ▌Ross Lynn Leone (Libertarian) 2.1%
Texas 29	D+8	Gene Green	Democratic	1992	Incumbent re-elected.	▌ ✓ Gene Green (Democratic) 74.6%; ▌Eric Story (Republican) 23.9%; ▌Joel Grace (Libertarian) 1.5%
Texas 30	D+26	Eddie Bernice Johnson	Democratic	1992	Incumbent re-elected.	▌ ✓ Eddie Bernice Johnson (Democratic) 82.5%; ▌Fred Wood (Republican) 15.9%; ▌Jarrett R. Woods (Libertarian) 1.6%
Texas 31	R+16	John Carter	Republican	2002	Incumbent re-elected.	▌ ✓ John Carter (Republican) 60.3%; ▌Brian Ruiz (Democratic) 36.6%; ▌Barry Cooper (Libertarian) 3.1%
Texas 32	R+11	Pete Sessions	Republican	1996	Incumbent re-elected.	▌ ✓ Pete Sessions (Republican) 57.2%; ▌Eric Roberson (Democratic) 40.6%; ▌Alex Bischoff (Libertarian) 2.2%

== Utah ==
District	CPVI	Incumbent	Party	First elected	Results	Candidates
Utah 1	R+22	Rob Bishop	Republican	2002	Incumbent re-elected.	▌ ✓ Rob Bishop (Republican) 64.9%; ▌Morgan Bowen (Democratic) 30.5%; ▌Kirk Pearson (Constitution) 2.4%; ▌Joseph Geddes Buchman (Libertarian) 2.2%
Utah 2	R+17	Jim Matheson	Democratic	2000	Incumbent re-elected.	▌ ✓ Jim Matheson (Democratic) 63.4%; ▌Bill Dew (Republican) 34.5%; ▌Matthew Arndt (Libertarian) 1.3%; ▌Dennis Ray Emery (Constitution) 0.8%
Utah 3	R+26	Chris Cannon	Republican	1996	Incumbent lost renomination. Republican hold.	▌ ✓ Jason Chaffetz (Republican) 65.6%; ▌Bennion L. Spencer (Democratic) 28.3%; ▌Jim Noorlander (Constitution) 6.1%

== Vermont ==
District	CPVI	Incumbent	Party	First elected	Results	Candidates
Vermont at-large	D+9	Peter Welch	Democratic	2006	Incumbent re-elected.	▌▌ ✓ Peter Welch (Democratic & Republican) 83.2%; ▌Mike Bethel (Independent) 4.8%; ▌Jerry Trudell (Energy Independence) 3.6%; ▌Thomas James Herman (Vermont Progressive) 3.0%; ▌Cris Ericson (Marijuana) 2.6%; ▌Jane Newton (Liberty Union) 1.7%

== Virginia ==
District	CPVI	Incumbent	Party	First elected	Results	Candidates
Virginia 1	R+9	Rob Wittman	Republican	2007 (special)	Incumbent re-elected.	▌ ✓ Rob Wittman (Republican) 56.6%; ▌Bill Day (Democratic) 41.8%; ▌Nathan Larson (Libertarian) 1.5%
Virginia 2	R+6	Thelma Drake	Republican	2004	Incumbent lost re-election. Democratic gain.	▌ ✓ Glenn Nye (Democratic) 52.4%; ▌Thelma Drake (Republican) 47.5%
Virginia 3	D+18	Bobby Scott	Democratic	1992	Incumbent re-elected.	▌ ✓ Bobby Scott (Democratic) 97.0%
Virginia 4	R+5	Randy Forbes	Republican	2001 (special)	Incumbent re-elected.	▌ ✓ Randy Forbes (Republican) 59.6%; ▌Andrea Miller (Democratic) 40.2%
Virginia 5	R+6	Virgil Goode	Republican	1996 (Note: Goode was elected as Democrat. He left the party in January 2000 and became a Republican in August 2002.)	Incumbent lost re-election. Democratic gain.	▌ ✓ Tom Perriello (Democratic) 50.1%; ▌Virgil Goode (Republican) 49.9%
Virginia 6	R+11	Bob Goodlatte	Republican	1992	Incumbent re-elected.	▌ ✓ Bob Goodlatte (Republican) 61.6%; ▌Sam Rasoul (Democratic) 36.6%; ▌Janice Lee Allen (Independent) 1.7%
Virginia 7	R+11	Eric Cantor	Republican	2000	Incumbent re-elected.	▌ ✓ Eric Cantor (Republican) 62.7%; ▌Anita Hartke (Democratic) 37.1%
Virginia 8	D+14	Jim Moran	Democratic	1990	Incumbent re-elected.	▌ ✓ Jim Moran (Democratic) 67.9%; ▌Mark Ellmore (Republican) 29.7%; ▌J. Ron Fisher (Independent Green) 2.1%
Virginia 9	R+7	Rick Boucher	Democratic	1982	Incumbent re-elected.	▌ ✓ Rick Boucher (Democratic) 97.1%
Virginia 10	R+5	Frank Wolf	Republican	1980	Incumbent re-elected.	▌ ✓ Frank Wolf (Republican) 58.8%; ▌Judy Feder (Democratic) 38.8%; ▌Neeraj Nigam (Independent) 2.2%
Virginia 11	R+1	Tom Davis	Republican	1994	Incumbent retired. Democratic gain.	▌ ✓ Gerry Connolly (Democratic) 54.7%; ▌Keith Fimian (Republican) 43.0%; ▌Joseph Oddo (Independent Green) 2.0%

== Washington ==
District	CPVI	Incumbent	Party	First elected	Results	Candidates
Washington 1	D+7	Jay Inslee	Democratic	1992; 1994 (defeated); 1998	Incumbent re-elected.	▌ ✓ Jay Inslee (Democratic) 67.8%; ▌Larry Ishmael (Republican) 32.2%
Washington 2	D+3	Rick Larsen	Democratic	2000	Incumbent re-elected.	▌ ✓ Rick Larsen (Democratic) 62.4%; ▌Rick Bart (Republican) 37.6%
Washington 3	Even	Brian Baird	Democratic	1998	Incumbent re-elected.	▌ ✓ Brian Baird (Democratic) 64.0%; ▌Michael Delavar (Republican) 36.0%
Washington 4	R+13	Doc Hastings	Republican	1994	Incumbent re-elected.	▌ ✓ Doc Hastings (Republican) 63.1%; ▌George Fearing (Democratic) 36.9%
Washington 5	R+7	Cathy McMorris Rodgers	Republican	2004	Incumbent re-elected.	▌ ✓ Cathy McMorris Rodgers (Republican) 65.3%; ▌Mark Mays (Democratic) 34.7%
Washington 6	D+6	Norm Dicks	Democratic	1976	Incumbent re-elected.	▌ ✓ Norm Dicks (Democratic) 66.9%; ▌Doug Cloud (Republican) 33.1%
Washington 7	D+30	Jim McDermott	Democratic	1988	Incumbent re-elected.	▌ ✓ Jim McDermott (Democratic) 83.6%; ▌Steve Beren (Republican) 16.4%
Washington 8	D+2	Dave Reichert	Republican	2004	Incumbent re-elected.	▌ ✓ Dave Reichert (Republican) 52.8%; ▌Darcy Burner (Democratic) 47.2%
Washington 9	D+6	Adam Smith	Democratic	1996	Incumbent re-elected.	▌ ✓ Adam Smith (Democratic) 65.5%; ▌James Postma (Republican) 34.5%

== West Virginia ==
District	CPVI	Incumbent	Party	First elected	Results	Candidates
West Virginia 1	R+6	Alan Mollohan	Democratic	1982	Incumbent re-elected.	▌ ✓ Alan Mollohan (Democratic) 99.9%
West Virginia 2	R+5	Shelley Moore Capito	Republican	2000	Incumbent re-elected.	▌ ✓ Shelley Moore Capito (Republican) 57.1%; ▌Anne Barth (Democratic) 42.9%
West Virginia 3	Even	Nick Rahall	Democratic	1976	Incumbent re-elected.	▌ ✓ Nick Rahall (Democratic) 66.9%; ▌Marty Gearheart (Republican) 33.1%

== Wisconsin ==
District	CPVI	Incumbent	Party	First elected	Results	Candidates
Wisconsin 1	R+2	Paul Ryan	Republican	1998	Incumbent re-elected.	▌ ✓ Paul Ryan (Republican) 64.0%; ▌Marge Krupp (Democratic) 34.7%; ▌Joseph Kexel (Libertarian) 1.3%
Wisconsin 2	D+13	Tammy Baldwin	Democratic	1998	Incumbent re-elected.	▌ ✓ Tammy Baldwin (Democratic) 69.3%; ▌Peter Theron (Republican) 30.6%
Wisconsin 3	D+3	Ron Kind	Democratic	1996	Incumbent re-elected.	▌ ✓ Ron Kind (Democratic) 63.2%; ▌Paul Stark (Republican) 34.4%; ▌Kevin Barrett (Libertarian) 2.3%
Wisconsin 4	D+20	Gwen Moore	Democratic	2004	Incumbent re-elected.	▌ ✓ Gwen Moore (Democratic) 87.6%; ▌Michael LaForest (Independent) 11.5%
Wisconsin 5	R+12	Jim Sensenbrenner	Republican	1978	Incumbent re-elected.	▌ ✓ Jim Sensenbrenner (Republican) 79.6%; ▌Robert R. Raymond (Independent) 20.2%
Wisconsin 6	R+5	Tom Petri	Republican	1979	Incumbent re-elected.	▌ ✓ Tom Petri (Republican) 63.7%; ▌Roger Kittelson (Democratic) 36.2%
Wisconsin 7	D+2	Dave Obey	Democratic	1969 (special)	Incumbent re-elected.	▌ ✓ Dave Obey (Democratic) 60.8%; ▌Dan Mielke (Republican) 39.1%
Wisconsin 8	R+4	Steve Kagen	Democratic	2006	Incumbent re-elected.	▌ ✓ Steve Kagen (Democratic) 54.0%; ▌John Gard (Republican) 45.9%

== Wyoming ==
District	CPVI	Incumbent	Party	First elected	Results	Candidates
Wyoming at-large	R+19	Barbara Cubin	Republican	1994	Incumbent retired. Republican hold.	▌ ✓ Cynthia Lummis (Republican) 52.6%; ▌Gary Trauner (Democratic) 42.8%; ▌W. David Herbert (Libertarian) 4.4%

== Non-voting delegates ==
Democratic hold Democratic gain Independent gain

District	Incumbent			This race	
District	Delegate	Party	First elected	Results	Candidates
American Samoa at-large	Eni Faleomavaega	Democratic	1988	Incumbent re-elected.	▌ ✓ Eni Faleomavaega (Democratic) 60.4%; ▌Amata Coleman Radewagen (Republican) 35.0%; ▌Rosie F. Tago Lancaster (Independent) 4.6%
District of Columbia at-large	Eleanor Holmes Norton	Democratic	1990	Incumbent re-elected.	▌ ✓ Eleanor Holmes Norton (Democratic) 92.3%; ▌Maude Hills (Green) 6.8%
Guam at-large	Madeleine Bordallo	Democratic	2002	Incumbent re-elected.	▌ ✓ Madeleine Bordallo (Democratic) Uncontested
Northern Mariana Islands at-large	New seat			New seat. New delegate elected. Independent gain.	▌ ✓ Gregorio Sablan (Independent) 24.5%; ▌Pedro Tenorio (Republican) 20.7%; ▌John Gonzales (Independent) 18.7%; ▌Juan Lizama (Independent) 17.3%; ▌Luis Cristostimo (Independent) 9.5%; ▌David Cing (Democratic) 2.9%; ▌Felipe Atalig (Independent) 2.5%; ▌Chong Won (Independent) 2.4%; ▌John Davis (Independent) 1.5%
Puerto Rico at-large	Luis Fortuño	New Progressive/ Republican	2004	Incumbent retired to run for Governor of Puerto Rico. New resident commissioner elected. New Progressive hold. Democratic gain.	▌ ✓ Pedro Pierluisi (PNP/Democratic) 53.1%; ▌Alfredo Salazar (PPD/Democratic) 42.5%; ▌Carlos Alberto Velazquez Lopez (PPPR) 2.4%; ▌Jessica Martinez (PIP) 2.0%
U.S. Virgin Islands at-large	Donna Christensen	Democratic	1996	Incumbent re-elected.	▌ ✓ Donna Christensen (Democratic) 99.6%

== See also ==
- 2008 United States elections
  - 2008 United States gubernatorial elections
  - 2008 United States presidential election
  - 2008 United States Senate elections
- 110th United States Congress
- 111th United States Congress
