= Steven Joyce (Maine politician) =

American politician

Member of the Maine House of Representatives from the 17th district
- In office December 7, 1994 – December 2, 1998
- Preceded by: George J. Kerr
- Succeeded by: Nancy Sullivan

Personal details
- Born: 1969 (age 56–57)
- Party: Republican
- Education: University of Southern Maine (BA); Southern New Hampshire University (MA)
- Profession: Concrete contractor

Steven Joyce (born 1969) is an American politician from Maine. Joyce, a Republican from Biddeford, served two terms (1995 – 1998) in the Maine House of Representatives (District 17). In 2002, he was the Republican nominee in Maine's 1st congressional district.

== 2002 congressional campaign ==
He was the Republican nominee for Maine's 1st congressional district in 2002. He faced incumbent Democratic nominee Tom Allen. He called for more funding for the U.S. military, supported a preemptive strike on Iraqi President Saddam Hussein, and denounced "government interference" in business. In October, Joyce called for the invasion of Iraq regardless of international opinion. This was in contrast to his opponent, who urged caution.

He was defeated in the general election after receiving 97,931 votes (36.19%).
