= 2008 United States Senate election in Maine =

- November 4, 2008
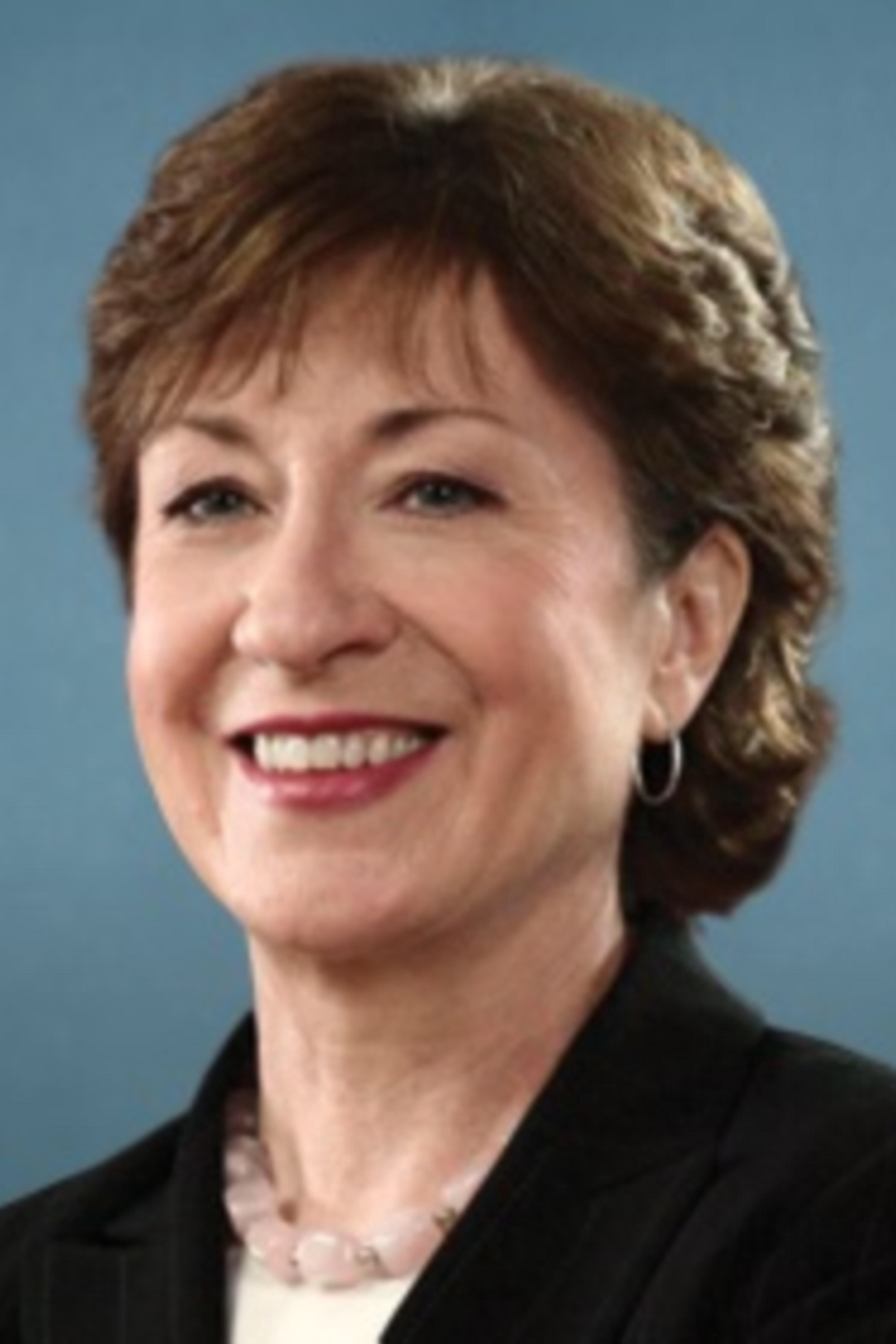

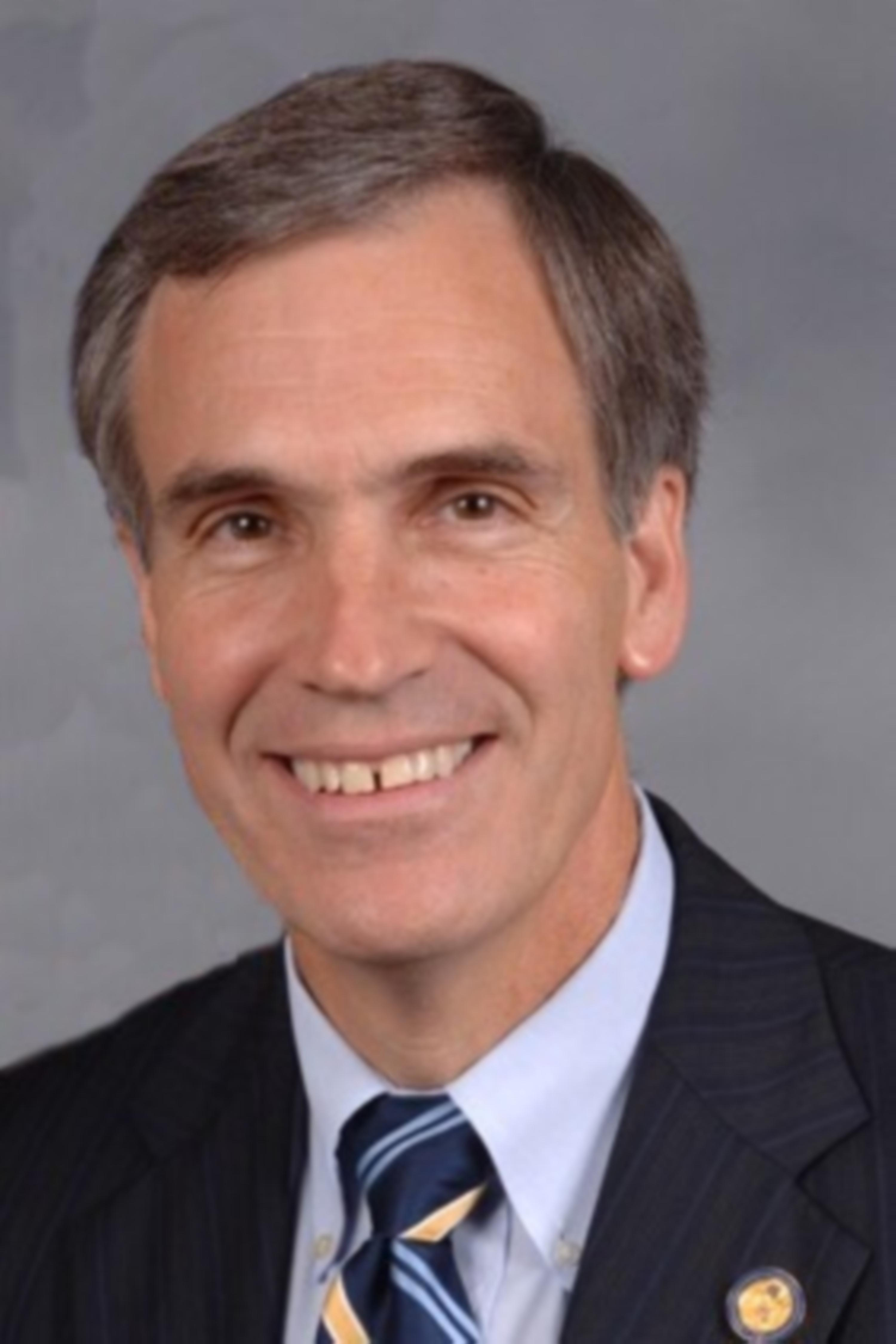
Nominee	Susan Collins	Tom Allen
Party	Republican	Democratic
Popular vote	444,300	279,510
Percentage	61.33%	38.58%
- Collins: 50–60% 60–70% 70–80% 80–90% >90% Allen: 50–60% 60–70%
U.S. senator before election
Susan Collins
Republican
Elected U.S. Senator
Susan Collins
Republican

The 2008 United States Senate election in Maine was held on November 4, 2008, to elect a member of the United States Senate to represent the state of Maine. Republican incumbent Susan Collins won re-election to a third term, defeating Democratic congressman Tom Allen.

== Republican primary ==
=== Candidates ===
==== Nominee ====
- Susan Collins, incumbent U.S. senator (1997–present)

=== Endorsements ===
Susan Collins

U.S. senators

- Joe Lieberman, Connecticut (1989–2013) (Independent)

== Democratic primary ==
=== Candidates ===
==== Nominee ====
- Tom Allen, U.S. representative from ME-01 (1997–2009)

==== Eliminated in primary ====
- Thomas Ledue, educator

=== Results ===
Democratic primary results
Party	Candidate	Votes	%
Democratic	Tom Allen	69,932	85.6
Democratic	Tom Ledue	11,795	14.4
Total votes		81,727	100.0

== General election ==
=== Campaign ===
Allen tried to tie Collins to George W. Bush, the tactics of which failed, as Collins maintained her image as a popular, moderate, independent Republican.

When Collins was first elected in 1996, she pledged to serve only two terms (twelve years) in office, which would have ended in January 2009. She decided to seek a third term and defeated Allen with over 60% of the vote. She was the only Republican Senate candidate to win in 2008 in a state that Democratic presidential nominee Barack Obama simultaneously won.

=== Predictions ===
Source	Ranking	As of
The Cook Political Report	Likely R	October 23, 2008
CQ Politics	Lean R	October 31, 2008
Rothenberg Political Report	Likely R	November 2, 2008
Real Clear Politics	Likely R	November 1, 2008

=== Post-primary endorsements ===
Susan Collins (R)

Organizations

- League of Conservation Voters

=== Polling ===
Poll source	Dates administered	Tom Allen (D)	Susan Collins (R)
Rasmussen Reports	November 1, 2008	41%	57%
Survey USA	October 20, 2008	43%	54%
Rasmussen Reports	October 2, 2008	43%	53%
Survey USA	September 22–23, 2008	39%	55%
Rasmussen Reports	September 17, 2008	42%	55%
Rasmussen Reports	August 12, 2008	40%	55%
Rasmussen Reports	July 17, 2008	42%	49%
Pan Atlantic SMS Group	June 18, 2008	31%	56%
Rasmussen Reports	June 16, 2008	42%	49%
Rasmussen Reports	May 14, 2008	42%	52%
Rasmussen Reports	April 1, 2008	38%	54%
McLaughlin & Associates/ Coalition for a Democratic Workforce	March 6–9, 2008	31%	54%
Critical Insights	October 12–30, 2007	34%	54%
Survey USA	October 26–29, 2007	38%	55%
Research 2000/Daily Kos	October 15–17, 2007	33%	56%

=== Results ===
General election results
Party	Candidate	Votes	%	±%
Republican	Susan Collins (incumbent)	444,300	61.33%	+2.89%
Democratic	Tom Allen	279,510	38.58%	−2.98%
Write-in		620	0.09%	N/A
Total votes		724,430	100.00%	
Republican hold				

==== Results by county ====
County	Susan Collins Republican		Thomas Allen Democratic		All others		Margin		Total votes cast
County	#	%	#	%	#	%	#	%	Total votes cast
Androscoggin	33,714	61.7%	20,941	38.3%	3	0.01%	12,773	23.4%	54,658
Aroostook	25,324	72.0%	9,812	27.9%	14	0.1%	15,512	44.1%	35,150
Cumberland	88,050	54.3%	73,658	45.5%	348	0.2%	14,392	8.8%	162,056
Franklin	10,471	61.6%	6,534	38.4%	0	0.0%	3,937	23.2%	17,005
Hancock	19,152	60.0%	12,771	40.0%	14	0.01%	6,381	20.0%	31,937
Kennebec	41,794	63.5%	23,977	36.4%	22	0.1%	17,817	27.1%	65,793
Knox	13,139	57.8%	9,578	42.1%	21	0.1%	3,561	15.7%	22,738
Lincoln	13,691	63.5%	7,847	36.4%	27	0.1%	5,844	27.1%	21,565
Oxford	19,621	62.2%	11,903	37.7%	11	0.1%	7,718	24.5%	31,535
Penobscot	53,619	66.9%	26,543	33.1%	34	0.01%	27,076	33.8%	80,196
Piscataquis	6,494	69.1%	2,896	30.8%	4	0.1%	3,598	38.3%	9,394
Sagadahoc	13,166	62.2%	7,993	37.7%	16	0.1%	5,173	24.5%	21,175
Somerset	16,635	64.6%	9,095	35.3%	3	0.1%	7,540	29.3%	25,733
Waldo	13,347	61.6%	8,288	38.3%	26	0.1%	5,059	23.3%	21,661
Washington	11,215	67.0%	5,507	32.9%	6	0.1%	5,708	34.1%	16,728
York	64,868	60.6%	42,167	39.4%	71	0.01%	22,701	21.2%	107,106
Totals	444,300	61.3%	279,510	38.6%	620	0.1%	164,790	22.7%	724,430

== See also ==
- 2008 United States Senate elections
