= Tom Allen (Maine politician) =

American author and politician (born 1945)

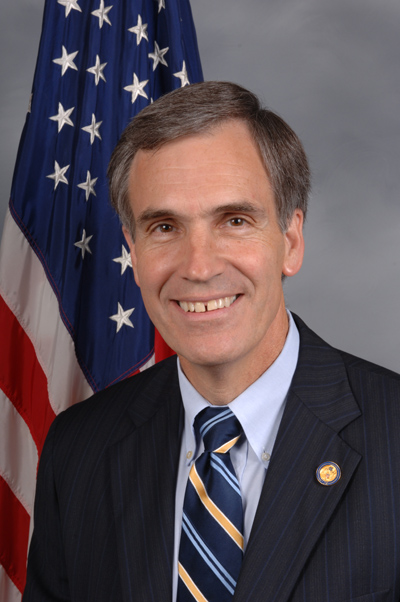

Member of the U.S. House of Representatives from Maine's 1st district
- In office January 3, 1997 – January 3, 2009
- Preceded by: James B. Longley Jr.
- Succeeded by: Chellie Pingree

110th Mayor of Portland
- In office 1991–1992
- Preceded by: Peter O'Donnell
- Succeeded by: Charles Harlow

Personal details
- Born: Thomas Hodge Allen; April 16, 1945 (age 81) Portland, Maine, U.S.
- Party: Democratic
- Spouse: Diana Allen
- Education: Bowdoin College (BA); Wadham College, Oxford (BPhil); Harvard University (JD)

Thomas Hodge Allen (born April 16, 1945) is an American author and former politician who served as a member of the United States House of Representatives representing Maine's 1st congressional district and the Democratic nominee for the U.S. Senate in 2008 against Republican incumbent senator Susan Collins. Allen lost to Collins 61.5% to 38.5%.

Allen was first elected in 1996, defeating Republican incumbent James Longley, Jr., with 55 percent of votes cast to Longley's 45 percent. Allen was re-elected five times, receiving over 55 percent of the vote each time in his district, until his defeat in his 2008 run for the U.S. Senate. After, Allen was appointed president and CEO of the Association of American Publishers and began his term on May 1, 2009. His book Dangerous Convictions: What's Really Wrong with the U.S. Congress came out in 2013.

== Early life ==
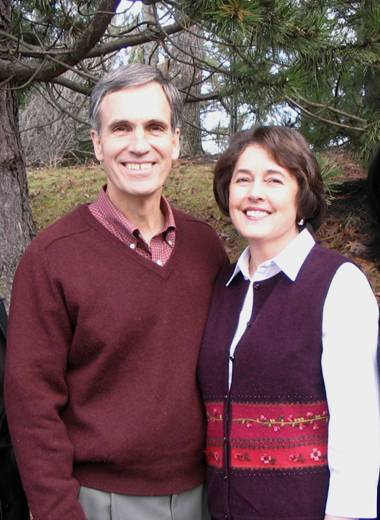
Tom Allen and his wife, Diana Allen.

Allen was born in Portland, Maine, to Genevieve ("Sukey") Lahee and Charles W. Allen. His grandfather, Neal W. Allen, was a civic leader who served as chairman (mayor) of Portland from 1925 to 1926. He graduated from Deering High School. He went on to Bowdoin College in Brunswick, Maine, before winning a Rhodes Scholarship to Wadham College, Oxford. During this time he became friends with fellow Rhodes scholar Bill Clinton. After Oxford, he went on to Harvard Law School and practiced as a lawyer.

== Early political career ==
He entered the field of politics when he became a staff member for Governor Kenneth M. Curtis and later for Senator Edmund S. Muskie. Allen was elected to the city council of Portland, Maine in 1989 and served as the city's mayor between 1991 and 1992 before winning election to the House. Allen ran for governor in 1994, losing to Joe Brennan in the Democratic primary.

== U.S. House ==
=== Tenure ===
Allen fought Republican efforts to weaken environmental rollbacks between 1996 and 2007. Allen called for a pay-as-you-go system that would require offsets to pay for new tax cuts and new spending while on the Budget Committee, much like the system Democrats enacted in their first 100 hours of Congressional control in the 110th Congress.

Allen has made health care, campaign finance reform, and small business his legislative priorities.

== Campaign for the United States Senate ==
In May 2007 Allen announced his campaign for the United States Senate seat held by Susan Collins. He tried to tie Collins to George W. Bush, but this tactic was unsuccessful as Collins maintained her image as a very popular, moderate, independent Republican. She obtained an endorsement from Independent and former Democratic U.S. Senator Joe Lieberman.

In the general election on November 4th 2008, Allen lost to Collins by 164,790 votes. Collins was the only Republican Senate candidate to win in 2008 in a state that was simultaneously won by Democratic presidential nominee Barack Obama.

=== Committees ===
- Committee on Energy and Commerce
  - Subcommittee on Health
  - Subcommittee on Energy and Air Quality
  - Subcommittee on Environment and Hazardous Materials
- Committee on the Budget
- House Affordable Medicines Task Force (Co-Chairman)
- House Oceans Caucus

== Election history ==
Year	Office	Winner	Party	Votes	%	Opponent	Party	Votes	%	Opponent	Party	Votes	%
1996	Maine's; 1st congressional district	Tom Allen	Dem.	173,745	55.32	Jim Longley Jr. (Inc.)	Rep.	140,354	44.68				
1998	Maine's; 1st congressional district	Tom Allen	Dem.	134,336	60.33	Ross Connelly	Rep.	79,160	35.55	Eric Greiner	Ind.	9,182	4.12
2000	Maine's; 1st congressional district	Tom Allen	Dem.	202,823	59.81	Jane Amero	Rep.	123,915	36.54	J. Frederic Staples	Lib.	12,356	3.64
2002	Maine's; 1st congressional district	Tom Allen	Dem.	172,646	63.81	Steven Joyce	Rep.	97,931	36.19				
2004	Maine's; 1st congressional district	Tom Allen	Dem.	219,077	59.74	Charlie Summers	Rep.	147,663	40.26				
2006	Maine's; 1st congressional district	Tom Allen	Dem.	168,709	60.67	Darlene Curley	Rep.	87,589	31.50	Dexter Kamilewicz	Ind.	21,792	7.84

Maine U.S. Senate Election 2008
Party	Candidate	Votes	%	±%
Republican	Susan Collins (incumbent)	444,587	61.5	
Democratic	Tom Allen	278,651	38.5	

== Footnotes ==
Political offices
Preceded by Peter O'Donnell	Mayor of Portland; 1991–1992	Succeeded by Charles Harlow
U.S. House of Representatives
Preceded by Jim Longley	Member of the U.S. House of Representatives from Maine's 1st congressional district 1997–2009	Succeeded by Chellie Pingree
Party political offices
Preceded by Chellie Pingree	Democratic nominee for U.S. Senator from Maine (Class 2); 2008	Succeeded by Shenna Bellows
U.S. order of precedence (ceremonial)
Preceded by Mo Brooks as Former U.S. Representative	Order of precedence of the United States as Former U.S. Representative	Succeeded by Mike Michaud as Former U.S. Representative
