= Kyle Foggo =

American former CIA officer convicted of fraud

- Born: Kyle Dustin Foggo; November 21, 1954 (age 71); San Diego, California, U.S.
- Education: San Diego State University
- Occupation: CIA operative
- Employer: Central Intelligence Agency
- Known for: Fraud and honest services fraud conviction
- Title: Executive Director
- Term: October 2004 – 2006
- Criminal charges: Honest services fraud, conspiracy, money laundering
- Criminal penalty: 37 months in federal prison at Pine Knot, Kentucky
- Criminal status: Released

Kyle Dustin "Dusty" Foggo (born November 21, 1954), is a former American government intelligence officer. He was convicted of honest services fraud in the awarding of a government contract and sentenced to 37 months in the federal prison at Pine Knot, Kentucky.

The executive director (EXDIR, the number three position) of the Central Intelligence Agency (CIA) until 2006, Foggo was charged on February 13, 2007, with fraud and other offenses. This indictment was superseded and expanded with an indictment returned on May 10, 2007, charging fraud, conspiracy and money laundering in relation to his dealings with defense contractor Brent R. Wilkes. On September 29, 2008, Foggo pleaded guilty to one count of the indictment, admitting that while CIA executive director he steered a CIA contract to the firm of his lifelong friend, Brent R. Wilkes. In a pre-sentencing report filed by prosecutors in February 2009, Foggo was also described as having a record of on the job corruption and off the job assaultive behavior stretching back 20 years.

== Biography ==
Foggo grew up in the San Diego, California, area and attended Hilltop High School and later San Diego State University.

After brief experience in law enforcement, Foggo entered the CIA through the Presidential Management Intern program and spent much of his career managing and awarding various contracts. Foggo began in what was then known as the CIA's Directorate of Administration (DA) which handled a significant portion of the agency's contracting. He spent most of his CIA career in Management General Services, but also did a stint in the Directorate of Science and Technology.

Foggo's early postings included stations in Europe and Latin America, including a position in Honduras in the 1980s where he worked with the US Ambassador to Honduras, John Negroponte, who would go on to become the Director of National Intelligence.

In 1989, while serving with the CIA station in Vienna, Foggo was arrested after assaulting a cyclist in a road-rage incident and reportedly attempted to avoid prosecution by invoking diplomatic immunity using State Department credentials. Station chief Olson considered Foggo's subsequent explanation implausible and reported the incident to the CIA's Office of Security.

Foggo was also chief of the CIA's support base in Germany, the base responsible for providing Middle East stations (including Iraq) with logistical support.

As EXDIR, he was responsible for executive management of the CIA bureaucracy. He was appointed, in October 2004, by then-Director of Central Intelligence Porter Goss over the objections of CIA staff.

== Criminal investigation ==
Foggo was charged on February 13, 2007, with fraud and other offenses.

Foggo was also investigated by CIA Inspector General John L. Helgerson for involvement in the Congressman Randy "Duke" Cunningham corruption investigation due to his personal and professional connections with Cunningham co-conspirator Brent Wilkes. Other agencies involved in the investigation include the Federal Bureau of Investigation, Internal Revenue Service, Defense Criminal Investigative Service and the United States Attorney's Office in San Diego.

The Cunningham scandal involved defense contractors who paid bribes to members of Congress, and officials in the Defense Department, in return for federal contracts. Most notable among the recipients of the bribes was Cunningham, who pleaded guilty to receiving over $2.3 million in bribes. The primary defense contractors were Mitchell Wade (owner of MZM), who also pleaded guilty, and Wilkes (owner of ADCS Inc.). Wilkes was named as "co-conspirator #1" in Cunningham's plea agreement.

Foggo and Wilkes are longtime friends. They attended school together at Hilltop High School in Chula Vista and San Diego State University, served as best men in each other's weddings, and named their sons after each other.

Suspicions were raised when Foggo, a mid-level career manager, was promoted to be the number three official of the CIA. Investigations have centered on whether Foggo helped steer agency contracts to companies run by Wilkes. Specifically, one of Wilkes' corporations received at least one CIA contract to supply bottled water to CIA personnel in Iraq during the invasion in 2003.

On May 8, 2006, Newsweek reported:

[A] source has told Newsweek that Foggo had acknowledged to associates that he may have tipped off Wilkes that CIA contracts were coming up for bid — an activity which, according to the source, Foggo said was neither improper nor illegal. The source is close to a group of poker players who took part in a 1999 game arranged by Wilkes and attended by Foggo, Cunningham and a nine-fingered former CIA officer named Brant Bassett, who worked for Goss when the outgoing CIA chief was House Intelligence Committee chair. Foggo denies giving Wilkes any such tip-offs, according to another source close to the outgoing CIA official; Bassett and lawyers for Wilkes and Cunningham had no comment.

The same day, the New York Daily News reported:

The investigations have focused on the Watergate poker parties thrown by defense contractor Brent Wilkes, a high-school buddy of Foggo's, that were attended by disgraced former Rep. Randy (Duke) Cunningham and other lawmakers.

Foggo has claimed he went to the parties "just for poker" amid allegations that Wilkes, a top GOP fund-raiser and a member of the $100,000 "Pioneers" of Bush's 2004 reelection campaign, provided prostitutes, limos and hotel suites to Cunningham. ...

Wilkes hosted regular parties for 15 years at the Watergate and Westin Grand Hotels for lawmakers and lobbyists. Intelligence sources said Goss has denied attending the parties as CIA director, but that left open whether he may have attended as a Republican congressman from Florida who was head of the House Intelligence Committee.

On May 12, 2006, law enforcement officials executed search warrants on Foggo's house and office. The same day, the Copley News Service reported that Foggo's home in Vienna, Virginia, had been raided by federal agents. The agents reportedly refused to answer questions about the purpose of the raid or what agency they represented.

On February 13, 2007, Foggo and Wilkes were indicted by the US Attorney's Office in San Diego. Subsequently, Foggo pleaded "not guilty" to 30 counts of fraud, conspiracy and money laundering. Prosecutors dropped objections to moving the corruption case against the former CIA official from San Diego to Virginia. This indictment was superseded and expanded with an indictment returned on May 10, 2007, charging fraud, conspiracy and money laundering in relation to his dealings with defense contractor Brent R. Wilkes.

On September 29, 2008, Foggo pleaded guilty to one count of the indictment, admitting that while CIA executive director he steered a CIA contract to the firm of his lifelong friend, Wilkes. In a presentencing report filed by prosecutors in February 2009, Foggo was also described as having a record of on the job corruption and off the job assaultive behavior stretching back 20 years. Assistant U.S. Attorney Jason Forge, speaking for the prosecution, stated that Foggo's acceptance of responsibility was too vague to warrant having his sentence reduced, as Foggo did not "admit that he had betrayed his CIA comrades through his crimes" while repeatedly claiming he was a patriot who "sacrificed for them by accepting the prosecutor’s plea agreement".
