= MZM =

MZM may refer to:

- Mach–Zehnder modulator
- Metroid: Zero Mission, a video game
- Metz-Frescaty Air Base, IATA airport code designation
- Money with zero maturity
- MonsterZ MATE - Japanese duo music unit and VTuber unit.
- Mozambican metical, the ISO 4217 code for the currency of Mozambique
- The MZM Scandal, a bribery scandal involving MZM, inc.
