= Hilltop High School (California) =

Public high school in Chula Vista, California, United States

Location
- 555 Claire Avenue; Chula Vista, California, 91910; United States; 32.6372°N 117.0596°W

Information
- Former name: Hilltop Senior High
- School type: Public, high school
- Motto: "The Focus at Hilltop is Academics"
- Established: 1959; 67 years ago
- School district: Sweetwater Union High School District
- Superintendent: Moisés G. Aguirre
- Principal: Julissa Gracias
- Teaching staff: 80.68 (on an FTE basis)
- Grades: 9–12
- Enrollment: 1,771 (2024–2025)
- Student to teacher ratio: 21.95
- Campus: Suburban
- Student Union/Association: ASB
- Colors: Kelly Green; White; Black
- Athletics conference: Metropolitan - Mesa League
- Mascot: Lancer
- Nickname: Lancers
- Newspaper: The Lance
- Yearbook: The Idyll
- Website: Official website

Hilltop High School (formerly Hilltop Senior High) is a four-year public high school in Chula Vista, California. It is part of Sweetwater Union High School District.

== School structure ==
In the 2005–06 school year, the school's Academic Performance Index placed it 698 (base) where 800 is the California state goal with a state rank of 5 out of 10.

== Curriculum ==
In the 2006–07 school year, the graduation rate was 93.3%.

Hilltop has the highest number of AP courses available to all students and the highest AP pass rate out of the entire SUHSD at 72.8%. Since the 1999–2000 school year, there has been a 25% increase in exams taken, a 7% increase in the overall pass rate, and a 30% increase in the total number of students testing.

== Athletics ==
The school colors are kelly green, white, and black. Its mascot is the "Lancer".

Hilltop is a member of the California Interscholastic Federation (CIF) San Diego Section and the Mesa League of the Metro Conference. Hilltop competes in the following sports:

Fall	Winter	Spring
Boys Water Polo; Cross Country; Football; Girls Field hockey; Girls Flag Football; Girls Golf; Girls Tennis; Girls Volleyball	Basketball; Cheer; Girls Water Polo; Roller Hockey; Soccer; Wrestling	Baseball; Beach Volleyball; Boys Golf; Boys Tennis; Boys Volleyball; Girls & Boys Swimming; Softball; Lacrosse; Track & Field

== Awards and recognition ==
Hilltop was named a California Distinguished School in 2005 and is accredited by the Western Association of Schools and Colleges (WASC).

== Notable alumni ==
- Joan D. Vinge (1965), Hugo Award-winning Science Fiction Author of The Snow Queen series
- Cheryl Cox (1966), Mayor of Chula Vista
- John Tschogl (1968), NBA player for the Atlanta Hawks and the Philadelphia 76ers
- Tom Waits (1968), American singer-songwriter, composer and actor
- Kyle Foggo (1972), Pleaded guilty to fraud associated with the Duke Cunningham scandal
- Brent R. Wilkes (1972), Convicted of conspiracy, bribery, fraud, and money laundering associated with the Duke Cunningham scandal
- Erich Anderson (1974), American actor (1957–2024)
- Bryan Wagner (1980), Former NFL punter for multiple teams
- Tommy Hinzo (1982), Former MLB player
- Bob Natal (1983), Former MLB player and World Series champion
- Tami Bruce (1985), Olympic swimmer
- Todd Pratt (1985), Major League Baseball player from 1992–2006 primarily with Philadelphia and the New York Mets
- Charles Adair (1989), College soccer coach and former professional player
- José Silva (1991), Former MLB player
- Jorge Munoz (1992), Football coach and former player
- Mike Jacobs (1998), Former MLB player
- Desiree Linden (2001), Winner of the 2018 Boston Marathon
- Charlotte Mayorkas (2001), LPGA Golfer, Three-time First Team All-American for UCLA
- Brittni De La Mora (2005), Pornographic actress turned Christian speaker
- Greg Allen (2011), Professional baseball player
- Calvin Faucher (2013), Professional baseball player
- Bianca Mora (2014), Professional soccer player

== Notable faculty ==
- Rene Ortiz, former soccer player
- Bryan Wagner
- Drew Westling
