= California's 50th congressional district =

U.S. House district for California

Coordinates: 33°N 116.6°W

- Interactive map of district boundaries
- Representative: Scott Peters; D–San Diego
- Population (2025): 776,342
- Median household income: $126,260
- Ethnicity: 54.8% White; 21.6% Hispanic; 14.3% Asian; 5.6% Two or more races; 2.6% Black; 1.1% other
- Cook PVI: D+16

California's 50th congressional district is a congressional district in the U.S. state of California, and encompasses parts of the Mid-Coast and northeastern parts of San Diego County. Scott Peters is currently the U.S. representative for California's 50th congressional district.

The district is currently in San Diego County. It includes coastal and central portions of the city of San Diego, including neighborhoods such as Carmel Valley, La Jolla, Point Loma and downtown San Diego; the San Diego suburbs of Poway and Coronado; and the campuses of schools such as the University of California, San Diego (partial), Point Loma Nazarene University, the University of San Diego, and various colleges of the San Diego Community College District. Much of this territory was in the 52nd district from 2013 to 2023.

From 2003 through 2013, California's 52nd consisted of many of San Diego's northern and eastern suburbs, including Santee, Lakeside, Poway, Ramona, La Mesa, Alpine, Winter Gardens, Borrego Springs, and Spring Valley. Due to redistricting after the 2010 United States census, much of this area is now part of the 50th district.

Despite being indicted by a federal grand jury for misusing campaign funds, Duncan D. Hunter narrowly won re-election in this district in 2018. On December 3, 2019, he pleaded guilty to one count of conspiracy misuse of campaign funds, and it was expected he would resign before being sentenced on March 17, 2020. On January 7, 2020, he submitted letters of resignation to both Speaker of the House Nancy Pelosi and Governor of California Gavin Newsom indicating that his resignation would take effect at close of business on January 13. A day later, Newsom's office stated that there would be no special election to fill the seat, and so it remained vacant until being filled in January 2021, as a result of the regularly scheduled 2020 election. Ammar Campa-Najjar, the Democratic nominee for the seat in 2018, and Republican Darrell Issa, who formerly represented California's 49th congressional district, competed in this election. Issa won the seat by 8 points.

== Recent election results from statewide races ==
=== 2023–2027 boundaries ===
Year	Office	Results
2008	President	Obama 59% - 40%
2010	Governor	Whitman 49% - 46%
2010	Lt. Governor	Newsom 46% - 44%
2010	Secretary of State	Bowen 48% - 44%
2010	Attorney General	Cooley 50% - 41%
2010	Treasurer	Lockyer 50% - 43%
2010	Controller	Chiang 50% - 42%
2012	President	Obama 56% - 44%
2014	Governor	Brown 54% - 46%
2016	President	Clinton 60% - 33%
2018	Governor	Newsom 61% - 39%
2018	Attorney General	Becerra 63% - 37%
2020	President	Biden 65% - 32%
2022	Senate (Reg.)	Padilla 63% - 37%
2022	Governor	Newsom 61% - 39%
2022	Lt. Governor	Kounalakis 62% - 38%
2022	Secretary of State	Weber 62% - 38%
2022	Attorney General	Bonta 60% - 40%
2022	Treasurer	Ma 61% - 39%
2022	Controller	Cohen 56% - 44%
2024	President	Harris 63% - 34%
2024	Senate (Reg.)	Schiff 62% - 38%

=== 2027–2033 boundaries ===
Year	Office	Results
2008	President	Obama 59% - 40%
2010	Governor	Brown 49% - 46%
2010	Lt. Governor	Newsom 46% - 44%
2010	Secretary of State	Bowen 48% - 44%
2010	Attorney General	Harris 50% - 41%
2010	Treasurer	Lockyer 50% - 43%
2010	Controller	Chiang 50% - 42%
2012	President	Obama 56% - 44%
2014	Governor	Brown 54% - 46%
2016	President	Clinton 60% - 33%
2018	Governor	Newsom 61% - 39%
2018	Attorney General	Becerra 63% - 37%
2020	President	Biden 65% - 32%
2022	Senate (Reg.)	Padilla 63% - 37%
2022	Governor	Newsom 61% - 39%
2022	Lt. Governor	Kounalakis 62% - 38%
2022	Secretary of State	Weber 62% - 38%
2022	Attorney General	Bonta 60% - 40%
2022	Treasurer	Ma 61% - 39%
2022	Controller	Cohen 56% - 44%
2024	President	Harris 63% - 34%
2024	Senate (Reg.)	Schiff 62% - 38%

== Composition ==
FIPS County Code	County	Seat	Population
73	San Diego	San Diego	3,269,973

Under the 2020 redistricting, California's 50th congressional district is located in Southern California, encompassing the coastal and central portions of the City of San Diego, and most of the South Bay region of San Diego County. It includes the San Diego neighborhoods of San Pasqual, Rancho Bernardo, La Jolla, Point Loma, University City, Torrey Pines, Mission Beach, North Park, Hillcrest, South Park, Golden Hill, Pacific Beach, Carmel Valley, Pacific Highlands Ranch, and Black Mountain Ranch; the cities of Coronado, San Marcos, and southern Escondido; and the census-designated places Lake San Marcos, Harmony Grove, Elfin Forest, Del Dios, Rancho Santa Fe, and Fairbanks Ranch.

San Diego County is split between this district, the 48th district, the 49th district, the 51st district, and 52nd district. The 50th and 48th are partitioned by Gopher Canyon Rd, Escondido Freeway, Mountain Meadow Rd, Hidden Meadows, Reidy Cyn, N Broadway, Cougar Pass Rd, Adagio Way, Calle Ricardo, Tatas Place, Rue Montreux, Jesmond Dene Rd, Ivy Dell Ln, N Centre City Parkway, Highway 15, Richland Rd, Vista Canal, Woodland Parkway, W El Norte Parkway, Bennett Ave, Elser Ln, Nordahl Rd, Calavo Dr, Deodar Rd, Highway 78, Barham Dr, 2315-2339 Meyers Ave, Hill Valley Dr, County Club Dr, Auto Park Way, Highway 56, N Centre City Parkway, W Valley Parkway, N Juniper St, Highway 78, N Hickory St, E Mission Ave, Martin Dr, E Lincoln Ave, N Ash St, E Grand Ave, Bear Valley Parkway, Old Guerjito Rd, San Pasqual Battlefield State Historic Park, San Pasqual Trails Openspace, San Dieguito River Park, Bandy Canyon Rd, Santa Maria Creek, Highland Valley Rd, West Ridge Trail, Palmer Dr/Summerfield Ln, Pomerado Rd, and Carmel Mountain Ranch Openspace.

The 50th and 49th are partitioned by Gopher Canyon Rd, Camino Cantera, Corre Camino, Tierra del Cielo, Elevado Rd, Vista Grande Dr, Warmlands Ave, Queens Way, Canciones del Cielo, Camino Loma Verde, Alessandro Trail, Friendly Dr, Edgehill Rd, Catalina Heights Way, Deeb Ct, Foothill Dr, Clarence Dr, Highway S14, Smilax Rd, Poinsetta Ave, W San Marcos Blvd, Diamond Trail Preserve, S Rancho Santa Rd, San Elijo Rd, Rancho Summitt Dr, Escondido Creek, El Camino del Norte, San Elijo Lagoon, Highland Dr, Avacado Pl, Jimmy Durante Blvd, San Dieguito Dr, 8th St, Nob Ave, Highway S21, and the San Diego Northern Railway.

The 50th and 51st are partitioned by Camino del Norte, Highway 15, Carmel Mountain Rd, Ted Williams Parkway, Del Mar Mesa Openspace, Los Penasquitos Creek, Inland Freeway, Governor Dr, Pavlov Ave, Stetson Ave, Millikin Ave, Regents Rd, Ducommun Ave, Bunch Ave, Branting St, Streseman St, Pennant Way, Highway 52, San Diego Freeway, Sea World Dr, Friars Rd, Kumeyaay Highway, and Highway 805.

The 50th and 52nd are partitioned by Iowa St, University Ave, Inland Freeway, Escondido Freeway, Martin Luther King Jr Freeway, John J Montgomery Freeway, and San Diego Bay.

=== Cities and CDPs with 10,000 or more people ===
- San Diego – 1,388,320
- Escondido – 151,038
- Rancho Bernardo – 133,481
- San Marcos – 94,833
- Coronado – 20,192

=== 2,500 – 10,000 people ===
- Lake San Marcos – 5,328
- Rancho Santa Fe – 3,156
- Fairbanks Ranch – 3,002

== List of members representing the district ==
Member	Party	Dates	Cong ress	Electoral history	Counties
District created January 3, 1993
Bob Filner (San Diego)	Democratic	January 3, 1993 – January 3, 2003	103rd 104th 105th 106th 107th	Elected in 1992. Re-elected in 1994. Re-elected in 1996. Re-elected in 1998. Re-elected in 2000. Redistricted to the 51st district.	1993–2003; San Diego (Southern suburbs)
Duke Cunningham (Del Mar)	Republican	January 3, 2003 – December 1, 2005	108th 109th	Redistricted from the 51st district and re-elected in 2002. Re-elected in 2004. Resigned after pleading guilty to multiple felonies.	2003–2013 San Diego (Northern suburbs)
Vacant		December 1, 2005 – June 13, 2006	109th		2003–2013 San Diego (Northern suburbs)
Brian Bilbray (Carlsbad)	Republican	June 13, 2006 – January 3, 2013	109th 110th 111th 112th	Elected to finish Cunningham's term. Re-elected in 2006. Re-elected in 2008. Re-elected in 2010. Redistricted to the 52nd district and lost re-election.	2003–2013 San Diego (Northern suburbs)
Duncan D. Hunter (Alpine)	Republican	January 3, 2013 – January 13, 2020	113th 114th 115th 116th	Redistricted from the 52nd district and re-elected in 2012. Re-elected in 2014. Re-elected in 2016. Re-elected in 2018. Resigned after pleading guilty to misusing campaign funds.	2013–2023 Inland San Diego (Escondido and Santee)
Vacant		January 13, 2020 – January 3, 2021	116th		2013–2023 Inland San Diego (Escondido and Santee)
Darrell Issa (Escondido)	Republican	January 3, 2021 – January 3, 2023	117th	Elected in 2020. Redistricted to the 48th district.	2013–2023 Inland San Diego (Escondido and Santee)
Scott Peters (San Diego)	Democratic	January 3, 2023 – present	118th 119th	Redistricted from the 52nd district and re-elected in 2022. Re-elected in 2024. Re-elected in 2026.	2023–present: Coastal and central portions of the city of San Diego

== Elections results ==
=== 1992 ===
1992 United States House of Representatives elections in California
Party	Candidate	Votes	%
Democratic	Bob Filner	77,293	56.6
Republican	Tony Valencia	39,531	28.9
Libertarian	Barbara Hutchinson	15,489	11.3
Peace and Freedom	Roger Bruce Batchelder	4,250	3.1
Independent	Pickard (write-in)	63	0.1
Total votes		136,626	100.0
Democratic gain from Republican			

=== 1994 ===
1994 United States House of Representatives elections in California
Party	Candidate	Votes	%
Democratic	Bob Filner (Incumbent)	59,214	56.7
Republican	Mary Alice Acevedo	36,955	35.4
Libertarian	Richardo Duenez	3,326	3.2
Peace and Freedom	Guillermo Ramirez	3,002	2.9
Green	Kip Krueger	1,954	1.8
Total votes		118,340	100.0
Democratic hold			

=== 1996 ===
1996 United States House of Representatives elections in California
Party	Candidate	Votes	%
Democratic	Bob Filner (Incumbent)	73,200	58.9
Republican	Jim Baize	38,351	32.5
Reform	Dan Clark	3,253	2.7
Natural Law	Earl Shepard	2,138	1.8
Libertarian	Philip Zoebisch	1,398	1.1
Total votes		118,340	100.0
Democratic hold			

=== 1998 ===
1998 United States House of Representatives elections in California
Party	Candidate	Votes	%
Democratic	Bob Filner (Incumbent)	77,354	99.2
Independent	Jon Parungoa (write-in)	596	0.8
Republican	Petra E. Barajas (write-in)	41	0.0
Total votes		77,991	100.0
Democratic hold			

=== 2000 ===
2000 United States House of Representatives elections in California
Party	Candidate	Votes	%
Democratic	Bob Filner (Incumbent)	95,191	68.3
Republican	Bob Divine	38,526	27.7
Libertarian	David A. Willoughby	3,472	2.4
Natural Law	LeAnn S. Kendall	2,283	1.6
Total votes		139,472	100.0
Democratic hold			

=== 2002 ===
2002 United States House of Representatives elections in California
Party	Candidate	Votes	%
Republican	Duke Cunningham (Incumbent)	111,095	64.4
Democratic	Del G. Stewart	55,855	32.3
Libertarian	Richard M. Fontanesi	5,751	3.3
Total votes		172,701	100.0
Republican hold			

=== 2004 ===
2004 United States House of Representatives elections in California
Party	Candidate	Votes	%
Republican	Duke Cunningham (Incumbent)	169,025	58.5
Democratic	Francine Busby	105,590	36.5
Green	Gary M. Waayers	6,504	2.2
American Independent	Diane Templin	4,723	1.6
Libertarian	Brandon C. Osborne	3,486	1.2
Total votes		289,328	100.0
Republican hold			

=== 2006 (special) ===
Representative Cunningham resigned on November 28, 2005, as a result of a bribery scandal. An open special election was held on April 11, 2006. The top vote getter was Democrat Francine Busby, who won 44% of the vote. The second-place finisher was Republican Brian Bilbray, who won 15% of the vote. Paul King was the top Libertarian party vote getter, with 0.6% of the vote. Since no candidate received a simple majority, the top vote-getters in each party competed in a runoff or special general election on June 6, 2006 (the same day as the statewide California primary). Bilbray was sworn in on June 13, based on unofficial counts, two weeks before the election was certified. As a consequence of this action, a court challenge to the election results filed by voters was denied on jurisdictional grounds. This decision was appealed unsuccessfully.

2006 California's 50th congressional district special election
Party	Candidate	Votes	%
Republican	Brian Bilbray	78,341	49.6
Democratic	Francine Busby	71,146	45.0
Independent	William Griffith	6,027	3.8
Libertarian	Paul King	2,519	1.6
Invalid or blank votes		882	0.5
Total votes		158,915	100.0
Republican hold			

=== 2006 ===
2006 United States House of Representatives elections in California
Party	Candidate	Votes	%
Republican	Brian Bilbray (Incumbent)	118,018	53.2
Democratic	Francine Busby	96,612	43.5
Libertarian	Paul King	4,119	1.8
Peace and Freedom	Miriam E. Clark	3,353	1.5
Total votes		222,102	100.0
Republican hold			

=== 2008 ===
2008 United States House of Representatives elections in California
Party	Candidate	Votes	%
Republican	Brian Bilbray (Incumbent)	157,502	50.2
Democratic	Nick Leibham	141,635	45.2
Libertarian	Wayne Dunlap	14,365	4.6
Total votes		313,502	100.0
Republican hold			

=== 2010 ===
2010 United States House of Representatives elections in California
Party	Candidate	Votes	%
Republican	Brian Bilbray (Incumbent)	142,236	56.7
Democratic	Francine Busby	97,813	39.0
Libertarian	Lars B. Grossmith	5,546	2.2
Peace and Freedom	Miriam E. Clark	5,470	2.1
Total votes		251,065	100.0
Republican hold			

=== 2012 ===
2012 United States House of Representatives elections in California
Party	Candidate	Votes	%
Republican	Duncan D. Hunter (Incumbent)	174,838	67.6
Democratic	David B. Secor	83,455	32.4
Total votes		258,293	100.0
Republican hold			

=== 2014 ===
2014 United States House of Representatives elections in California
Party	Candidate	Votes	%
Republican	Duncan D. Hunter (Incumbent)	111,997	71.2
Democratic	James H. Kimber	45,302	28.8
Total votes		157,299	100.0
Republican hold			

=== 2016 ===
2016 United States House of Representatives elections in California
Party	Candidate	Votes	%
Republican	Duncan D. Hunter (Incumbent)	179,937	63.5
Democratic	Patrick Malloy	103,646	36.5
Total votes		283,583	100.0
Republican hold			

=== 2018 ===
2018 United States House of Representatives elections in California
Party	Candidate	Votes	%
Republican	Duncan D. Hunter (Incumbent)	134,362	51.7
Democratic	Ammar Campa-Najjar	125,448	48.3
Total votes		259,808	100.0
Republican hold			

=== 2020 ===
2020 United States House of Representatives elections in California
Party	Candidate	Votes	%
Republican	Darrell Issa	195,510	54.0
Democratic	Ammar Campa-Najjar	166,859	46.0
Total votes		362,369	100.0
Republican hold			

=== 2022 ===
2022 United States House of Representatives elections in California
Party	Candidate	Votes	%
Democratic	Scott Peters (Incumbent)	168,816	62.8
Republican	Corey Gustafson	99,819	37.2
Total votes		268,635	100.0
Democratic hold			

=== 2024 ===
2024 United States House of Representatives elections in California
Party	Candidate	Votes	%
Democratic	Scott Peters (Incumbent)	231,836	64.3
Republican	Peter Bono	128,859	35.7
Total votes		360,695	100.0
Democratic hold			

== Historical district boundaries ==
=== 44th district ===
In the 1980s, California's 44th congressional district was one of four encompassing San Diego. The district had been held for eight years by Democrat Jim Bates and was considered the most Democratic district in the San Diego area. However, Bates became bogged down in a scandal involving charges of sexual harassment.

Randy "Duke" Cunningham won the Republican nomination and hammered Bates about the scandal. Cunningham won by a point. The San Diego area was represented entirely by Republicans for only the second time since the city was split into three districts after the 1960 United States census. After his victory, Cunningham changed his official residence from his Del Mar home to a condominium in the Mission Valley neighborhood in San Diego, so that he was perceived as residing in the district that he represented in Congress.

=== 41st district ===
In the 1980s, California's 41st congressional district was another of four encompassing San Diego. The northern San Diego County district had been held for 12 years by Republican Bill Lowery and was considered the most Republican district in the San Diego area. Most of the district became the California's 51st congressional district after state redistricting following the 1990 United States census.

In 1992, Cunningham campaigned against Lowery in Lowery's district in the Republican primary. The new 51st district was more dominated by ethnic whites and was more conservative than Cunningham's more urban, former 41st district located farther south. Lowery was tainted by the House check kiting scandal and lost the primary to Cunningham. The latter, a Navy career officer, had run on a campaign theme of "A Congressman We Can Be Proud Of." After winning, Cunningham changed his official residence back to his Del Mar home in the old 41st/new 51st district.

=== 2003-13 ===
From 2003 to 2013, the 50th district consisted of the northern coastal region of San Diego County and included the suburbs of San Marcos, Carlsbad, Encinitas, Solana Beach, and Escondido.

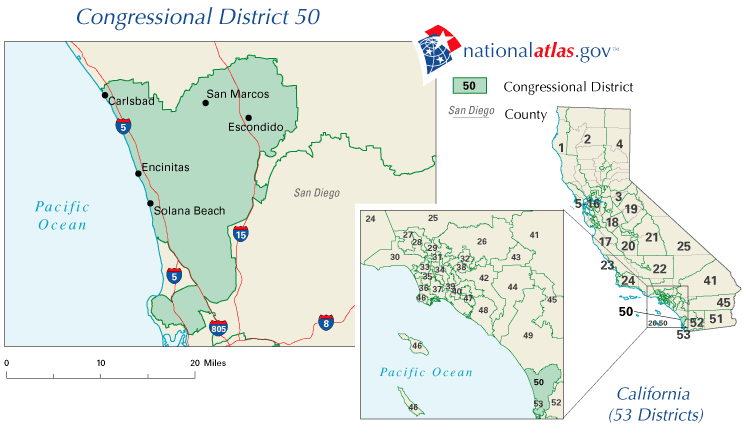

=== 2013-23 ===
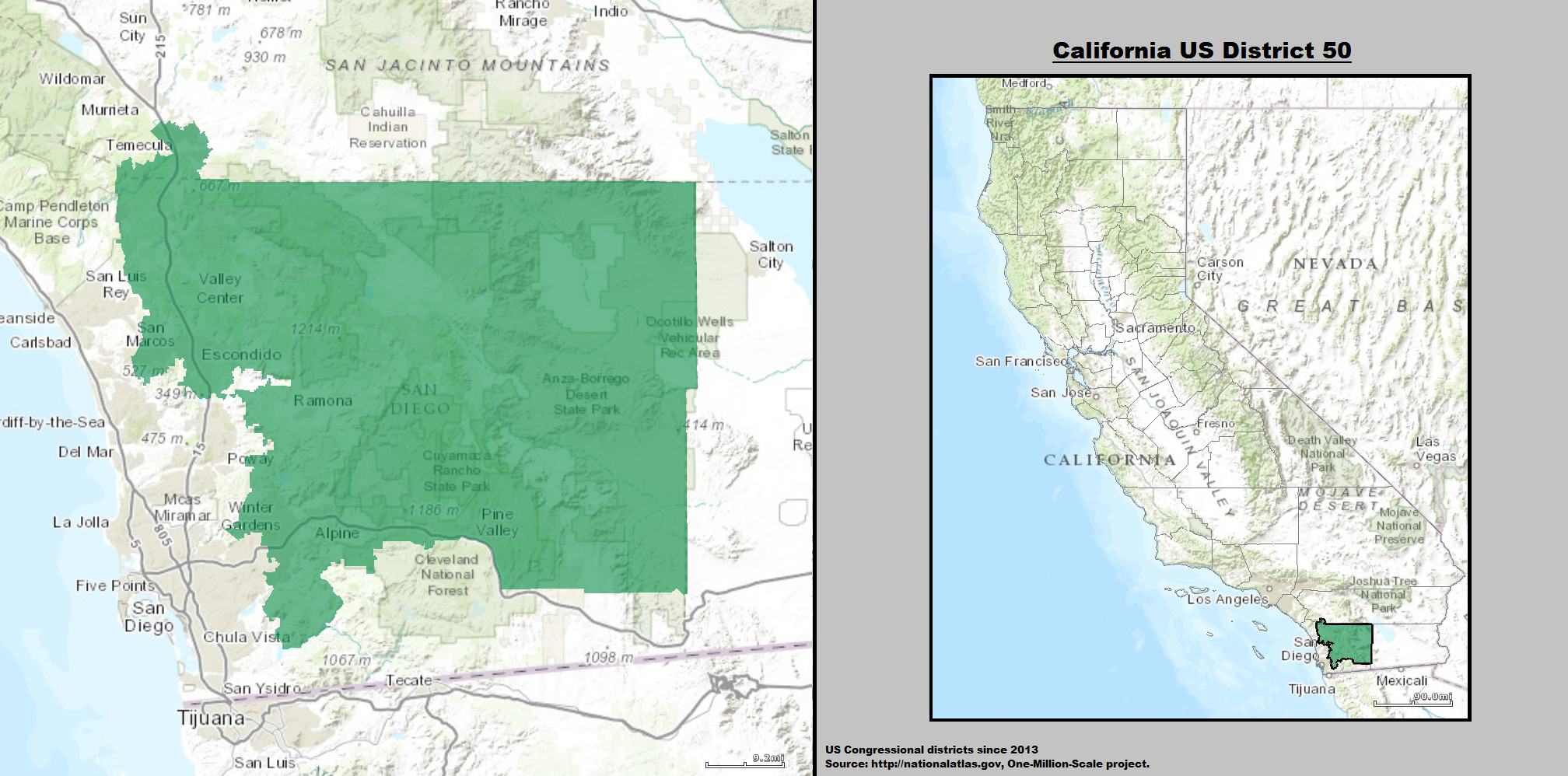

== In popular culture ==
On November 29, 2005, Stephen Colbert of Comedy Central's The Colbert Report declared on his show that the 50th congressional district was "dead" to him after its insufficient support for his "friend" Duke Cunningham. Colbert placed the district on the show's ever-changing "Dead to Me" board, saying that he now considered the number of congressional districts in the United States to be 434. (The number became 433 when he retired the 22nd district of Texas for its insufficient support for Tom DeLay.) On March 1, 2006, he "downgraded" the 50th district's status from "dead to me" to "never existed to me".

== See also ==
- California's congressional delegations
- California's congressional districts
- List of United States congressional districts
