= California's 51st congressional district =

U.S. House district for California

Coordinates: 32.8°N 116°W

- Interactive map of district boundaries
- Representative: Sara Jacobs; D–San Diego
- Area: 4,896 mi^{2} (12,680 km^{2})
- Population (2025): 758,912
- Median household income: $110,320
- Ethnicity: 45.7% White; 25.0% Hispanic; 16.1% Asian; 6.1% Two or more races; 5.8% Black; 1.3% other
- Cook PVI: D+13

California's 51st congressional district is a congressional district in the U.S. state of California. The district is currently represented by Democrat Sara Jacobs. The district currently includes central and eastern portions of San Diego, much of Mission Valley, as well as eastern suburbs such as El Cajon, La Mesa, Spring Valley, and Lemon Grove.

== Recent election results from statewide races ==
=== 2023–2027 boundaries ===
Year	Office	Results
2008	President	Obama 56% - 43%
2010	Governor	Whitman 48% - 46%
2010	Lt. Governor	Maldonado 45% - 44%
2010	Secretary of State	Bowen 48% - 43%
2010	Attorney General	Cooley 50% - 41%
2010	Treasurer	Lockyer 51% - 41%
2010	Controller	Chiang 52% - 40%
2012	President	Obama 56% - 44%
2014	Governor	Brown 54% - 46%
2016	President	Clinton 58% - 35%
2018	Governor	Newsom 59% - 41%
2018	Attorney General	Becerra 61% - 39%
2020	President	Biden 62% - 35%
2022	Senate (Reg.)	Padilla 61% - 39%
2022	Governor	Newsom 60% - 40%
2022	Lt. Governor	Kounalakis 60% - 40%
2022	Secretary of State	Weber 61% - 39%
2022	Attorney General	Bonta 59% - 41%
2022	Treasurer	Ma 60% - 40%
2022	Controller	Cohen 55% - 45%
2024	President	Harris 60% - 37%
2024	Senate (Reg.)	Schiff 60% - 40%

=== 2027–2033 boundaries ===
Year	Office	Results
2008	President	Obama 56% - 43%
2010	Governor	Brown 48% - 46%
2010	Lt. Governor	Newsom 45% - 44%
2010	Secretary of State	Bowen 48% - 43%
2010	Attorney General	Harris 50% - 41%
2010	Treasurer	Lockyer 51% - 41%
2010	Controller	Chiang 52% - 40%
2012	President	Obama 56% - 44%
2014	Governor	Brown 54% - 46%
2016	President	Clinton 58% - 35%
2018	Governor	Newsom 59% - 41%
2018	Attorney General	Becerra 61% - 39%
2020	President	Biden 62% - 35%
2022	Senate (Reg.)	Padilla 61% - 39%
2022	Governor	Newsom 60% - 40%
2022	Lt. Governor	Kounalakis 60% - 40%
2022	Secretary of State	Weber 61% - 39%
2022	Attorney General	Bonta 59% - 41%
2022	Treasurer	Ma 60% - 40%
2022	Controller	Cohen 55% - 45%
2024	President	Harris 60% - 37%
2024	Senate (Reg.)	Schiff 60% - 40%

== Composition ==
FIPS County Code	County	Seat	Population
73	San Diego	San Diego	3,269,973

Under the 2020 redistricting, California's 51st congressional district is located in Southern California, in an area entirely within the San Diego Metropolitan Area of San Diego County. It includes the San Diego neighborhoods of Paradise Hills, Mira Mesa, Miramar, San Carlos, Sorrento, Clairemont, Normal Heights, Allied Gardens, Grantville, Balboa Park, Linda Vista, and Serra Mesa; the cities of El Cajon, Lemon Grove, and La Mesa; and the census-designated places La Presa and Spring Valley.

San Diego County is split between this district, the 50th district, the 48th district, and the 52nd district. The 51st and 48th are partitioned by Sabre Springs Openspace, Scripps Miramar Openspace, Beeler Canyon Rd, Sycamore Canyon Openspace, Weston Rd, Boulder Vis, Mast Blvd, West Hills Parkway, San Diego River, Highway 52, Simeon Dr, Mission Trails Openspace, Fanita Dr, Farmington Dr, Lund St, Nielsen St, Paseo de Los Castillos, Gillespie Air Field, Kenney St, San Vicente Freeway, Airport Dr, Wing Ave, W Bradley Ave, Vernon Way, Hart Dr, Greenfield Dr, E Bradley Ave, 830 Adele St-1789 N Mollison Ave, Peppervilla Dr/N Mollison Ave, Pepper Dr, Greta St/Cajon Greens Dr, N Mollison Ave/Buckey Dr, Denver Ln, Broadway Channel, N 2nd St, Flamingo Ave/Greenfield Dr, Dawnridge Ave/Cresthill Rd, Groveland Ter/Camillo Way, Sterling Dr, Kumeyaay Highway, E Madison Ave, Granite Hills Dr, E Lexington Ave, Dehesa Rd, Vista del Valle Blvd, Merritt Ter, E Washington Ave, Merritt Dr, Dewitt Ct, Emerald Heights Rd, Foote Path Way, Highway 8, Lemon Ave, Lake Helix Dr, La Cruz Dr, Carmichael Dr, Bancroft Dr, Campo Rd, and Sweetwater River.

The 51st and 50th are partitioned by Camino del Norte, Highway 15, Carmel Mountain Rd, Ted Williams Parkway, Del Mar Mesa Openspace, Los Penasquitos Creek, Inland Freeway, Governor Dr, Pavlov Ave, Stetson Ave, Millikin Ave, Regents Rd, Ducommun Ave, Bunch Ave, Branting St, Streseman St, Pennant Way, Highway 52, San Diego Freeway, Sea World Dr, Friars Rd, Kumeyaay Highway, and Highway 805.

The 51st and 52nd are partitioned by El Cajon Blvd, 58th St, Streamview Dr, College Ave, Meridian Ave, Lemarand Ave, Highway 94, Charlene Ave, 69th St, Imperial Ave, Larwood Rd, Taft St, Lincoln Pl, Glencoe Dr, Braddock St, Carlisle Dr, Carlsbad Ct/Osage Dr, Potrero St, Carlsbad St, Innsdale Ave, Worthington St/Innsdale Ln, Brady Ct/Innsdale Ln, Parkbrook Way/Alene St, Tinaja Ln/Bluffview Rd, Highway 54, Sweetwater Rd, and Bonita Rd.

=== Cities and CDPs with 10,000 or more people ===
- San Diego – 1,388,320
- El Cajon – 106,215
- La Mesa – 61,121
- La Presa – 35,033
- Spring Valley – 30,998
- Lemon Grove – 27,413

== List of members representing the district ==
Member	Party	Dates	Cong ress(es)	Electoral history	Counties
District created January 3, 1993
Duke Cunningham (Del Mar)	Republican	January 3, 1993 – January 3, 2003	103rd 104th 105th 106th 107th	Redistricted from the 44th district and re-elected in 1992. Re-elected in 1994. Re-elected in 1996. Re-elected in 1998. Re-elected in 2000. Redistricted to the 50th district.	1993–2003; Northern San Diego
Bob Filner (San Diego)	Democratic	January 3, 2003 – December 3, 2012	108th 109th 110th 111th 112th	Redistricted from the 50th district and re-elected in 2002. Re-elected in 2004. Re-elected in 2006. Re-elected in 2008. Re-elected in 2010. Resigned to become mayor of San Diego.	2003–2013 Imperial; Eastern San Diego
Vacant		December 3, 2012 – January 3, 2013	112th		2003–2013 Imperial; Eastern San Diego
Juan Vargas (San Diego)	Democratic	January 3, 2013 – January 3, 2023	113th 114th 115th 116th 117th	Elected in 2012. Re-elected in 2014. Re-elected in 2016. Re-elected in 2018. Re-elected in 2020. Redistricted to the 52nd district.	2013–2023 Imperial; Southern San Diego
Sara Jacobs (San Diego)	Democratic	January 3, 2023 – present	118th 119th	Redistricted from the 53rd district and re-elected in 2022. Re-elected in 2024. Re-elected in 2026.	2023–present: Central and eastern portions of San Diego, as well as eastern suburbs such as El Cajon, La Mesa, Spring Valley, and Lemon Grove

== Election results ==
=== 1992 ===
1992 United States House of Representatives elections in California
Party	Candidate	Votes	%
Republican	Duke Cunningham (Incumbent)	141,890	56.1
Democratic	Bea Herbert	85,148	33.7
Libertarian	Bill Holmes	10,309	4.1
Peace and Freedom	Miriam Clark	10,307	4.1
Green	Richard Roe	5,328	2.1
Independent	Johnson (write-in)	13	0.0
Total votes		262,995	100.0
Republican hold			

=== 1994 ===
1994 United States House of Representatives elections in California
Party	Candidate	Votes	%
Republican	Duke Cunningham (Incumbent)	138,547	66.9
Democratic	Rita K. Tamerius	57,374	27.7
Libertarian	Bill Holmes	6,968	3.4
Peace and Freedom	Miriam Clark	4,099	2.0
Total votes		206,968	100.0
Republican hold			

=== 1996 ===
1996 United States House of Representatives elections in California
Party	Candidate	Votes	%
Republican	Duke Cunningham (Incumbent)	149,032	65.1
Democratic	Rita Tamerius	66,250	29.0
Peace and Freedom	Miriam Clark	5,407	2.3
Libertarian	J.C. Anderson	5,298	2.3
Natural Law	Eric Bourdette	3,037	1.3
Total votes		215,282	100.0
Republican hold			

=== 1998 ===
1998 United States House of Representatives elections in California
Party	Candidate	Votes	%
Republican	Duke Cunningham (Incumbent)	126,229	61.02
Democratic	Dan Kripke	71,706	34.66
Libertarian	Jack Anderson	5,411	2.62
Natural Law	Eric Bourdette	3,532	1.71
Independent	Don J. Pando (write-in)	0	0.0
Total votes		206,878	100.0
Republican hold			

=== 2000 ===
-->

2000 United States House of Representatives elections in California
Party	Candidate	Votes	%
Republican	Duke Cunningham (Incumbent)	172,291	64.4
Democratic	George "Jorge" Barraza	81,408	30.4
Libertarian	Daniel L. Muhe	7,159	2.7
Natural Law	Eric Hunter Bourdette	6,941	2.5
Total votes		267,799	100.0
Turnout			
Republican hold			

=== 2002 ===
2002 United States House of Representatives elections in California
Party	Candidate	Votes	%
Democratic	Bob Filner (Incumbent)	59,541	58.0
Republican	Maria Guadalupe Garcia	40,430	39.3
Libertarian	Jeffrey S. Keup	2,816	2.7
Total votes		102,787	100.0
Democratic hold			

=== 2004 ===
2004 United States House of Representatives elections in California
Party	Candidate	Votes	%
Democratic	Bob Filner (Incumbent)	111,441	61.7
Republican	Michael Giorgino	63,526	35.1
Libertarian	Michael S. Metti	5,912	3.2
Total votes		180,879	100.0
Democratic hold			

=== 2006 ===
-->

2006 United States House of Representatives elections in California
Party	Candidate	Votes	%
Democratic	Bob Filner (Incumbent)	78,114	67.5
Republican	Blake L. Miles	34,931	30.1
Libertarian	Dan Litwin	2,790	2.4
Independent	David Arguello (write-in)	4	0.0
Total votes		115,839	100.0
Turnout			
Democratic hold			

=== 2008 ===
2008 United States House of Representatives elections in California
Party	Candidate	Votes	%
Democratic	Bob Filner (Incumbent)	148,281	72.8
Republican	David Lee Joy	49,345	24.2
Libertarian	Dan Litwin	6,199	3.0
Total votes		203,825	100.0
Democratic hold			

=== 2012 ===
2012 United States House of Representatives elections in California
Party	Candidate	Votes	%
Democratic	Juan Vargas	85,672	71.5
Republican	Michael Crimmins	36,649	28.5
Total votes		122,321	100.0
Democratic hold			

=== 2014 ===
2014 United States House of Representatives elections in California
Party	Candidate	Votes	%
Democratic	Juan Vargas (Incumbent)	56,373	68.8
Republican	Stephen Meade	25,577	31.2
Total votes		81,950	100.0
Democratic hold			

=== 2016 ===
2016 United States House of Representatives elections in California
Party	Candidate	Votes	%
Democratic	Juan Vargas (Incumbent)	145,162	72.8
Republican	Juan M Hidalgo Jr	54,362	27.2
Total votes		199,524	100.0
Democratic hold			

=== 2018 ===
2018 United States House of Representatives elections in California
Party	Candidate	Votes	%
Democratic	Juan Vargas (Incumbent)	109,527	71.2
Republican	Juan M Hidalgo Jr	44,301	28.8
Total votes		153,828	100.0
Democratic hold			

=== 2020 ===
2020 United States House of Representatives elections in California
Party	Candidate	Votes	%
Democratic	Juan Vargas (Incumbent)	165,596	68.3
Republican	Juan M Hidalgo Jr	76,841	31.7
Total votes		242,437	100.0
Democratic hold			

=== 2022 ===
2022 United States House of Representatives elections in California
Party	Candidate	Votes	%
Democratic	Sara Jacobs (Incumbent)	144,186	61.9
Republican	Stan Caplan	88,886	38.1
Total votes		233,072	100.0
Democratic hold			

=== 2024 ===
2024 United States House of Representatives elections in California
Party	Candidate	Votes	%
Democratic	Sara Jacobs (Incumbent)	198,835	60.7
Republican	Bill Wells	128,749	39.3
Total votes		327,584	100.0
Democratic hold			

== Historical district boundaries ==
In the 1980s, California's 44th congressional district was one of four that divided San Diego. The district had been held for eight years by Democrat Jim Bates, and was considered the most Democratic district in the San Diego area. Randy "Duke" Cunningham won the Republican nomination and won the general election by just a point, meaning that the San Diego area was represented entirely by Republicans for only the second time since the city was split into three districts after the 1960 United States census.

After the 1990 United States census, the district was renumbered the 51st congressional district and much of its share of San Diego was moved to the new 50th congressional district.

=== 2003-13 ===
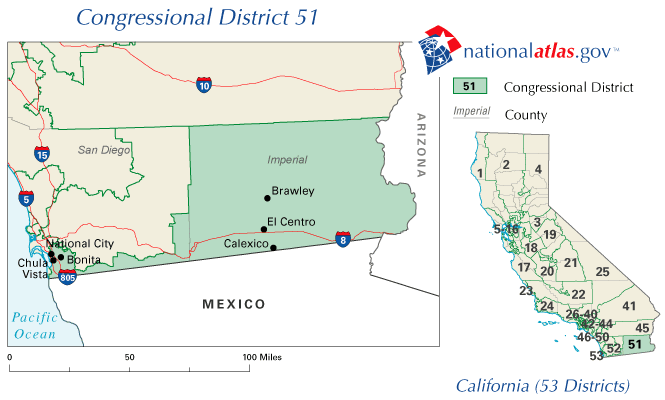

=== 2013-23 ===
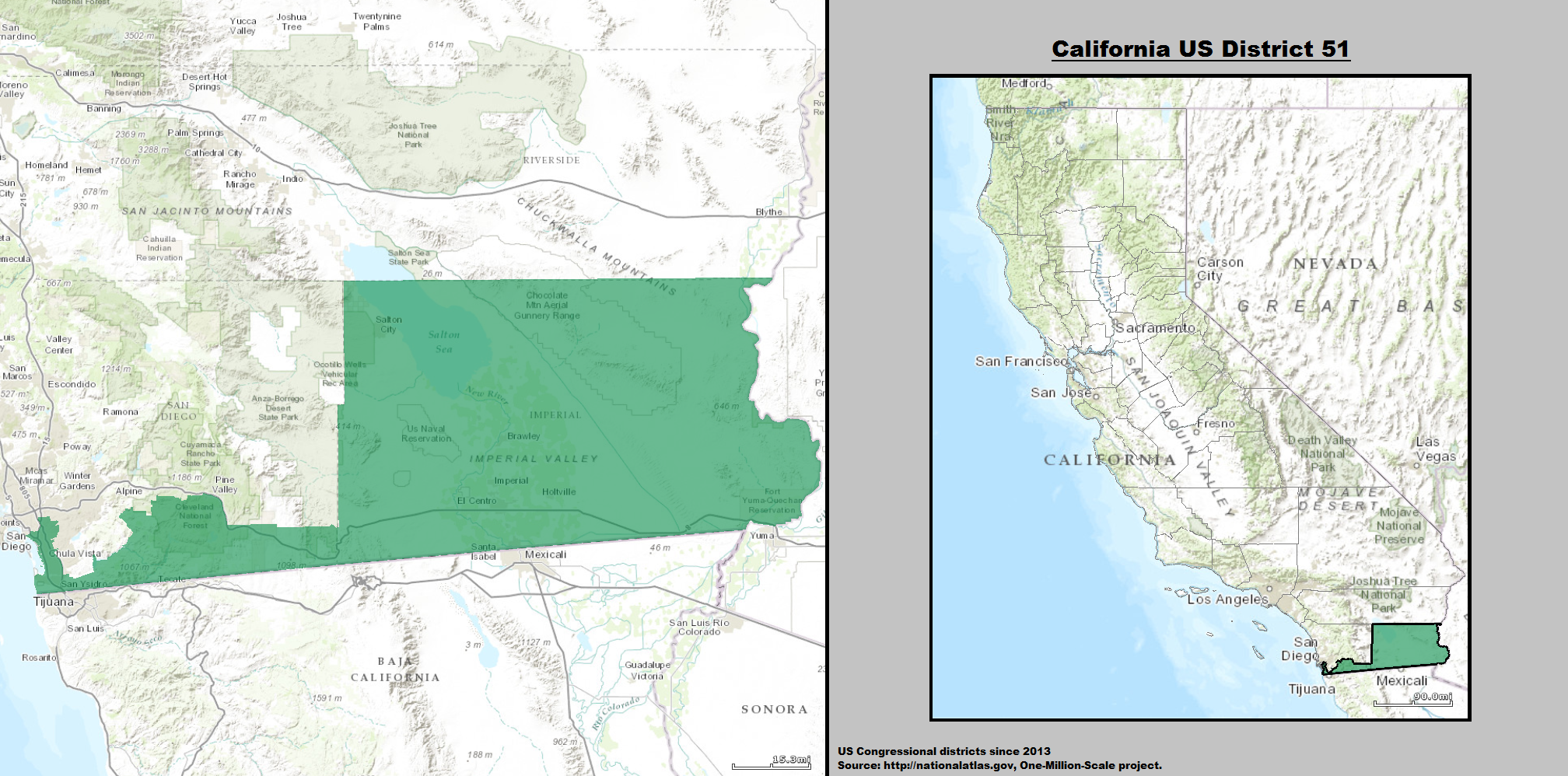

== See also ==
- List of United States congressional districts
- California's congressional districts
