= 2022 California lieutenant gubernatorial election =

- November 8, 2022
- Registered: 21,940,274
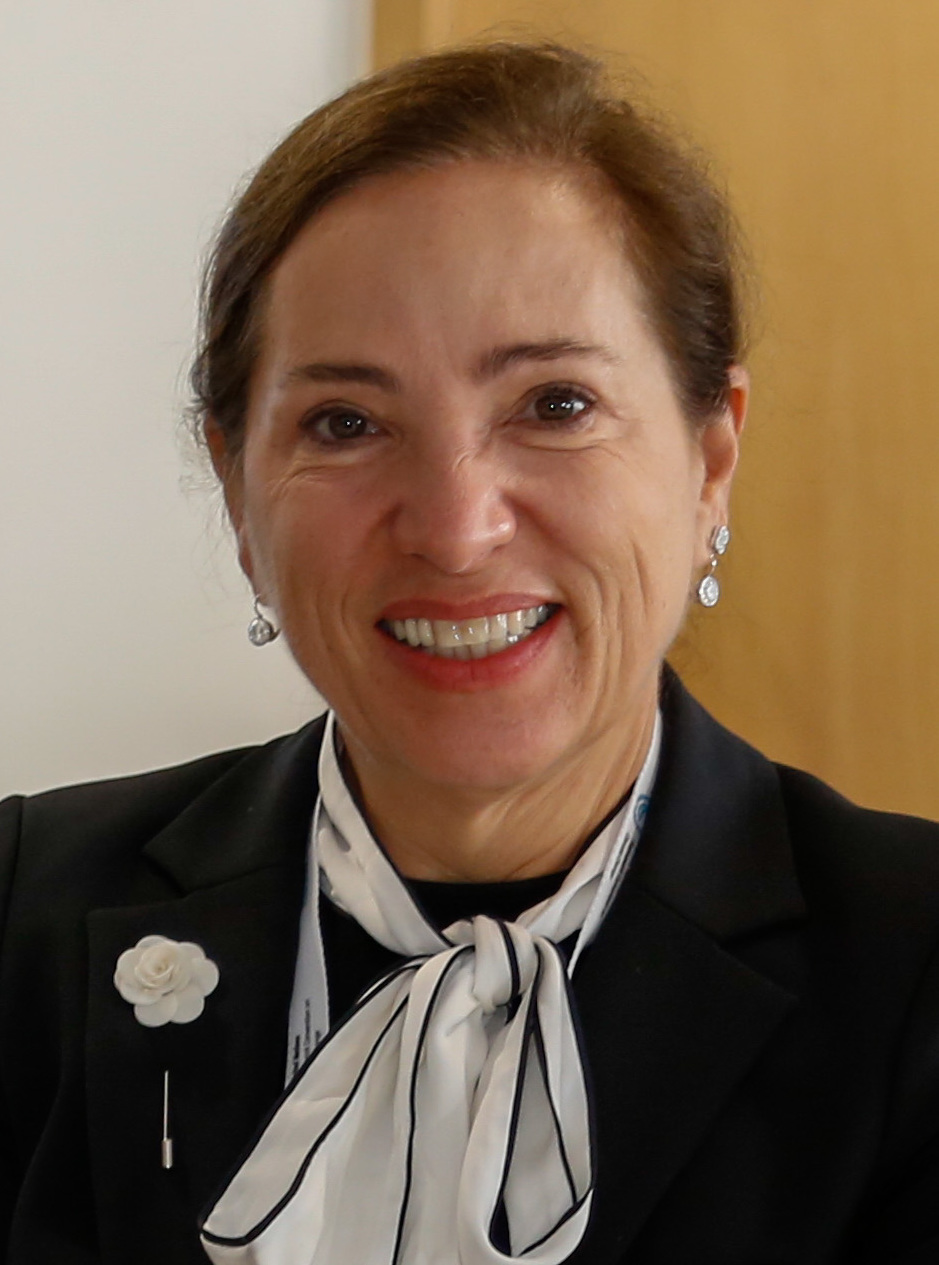

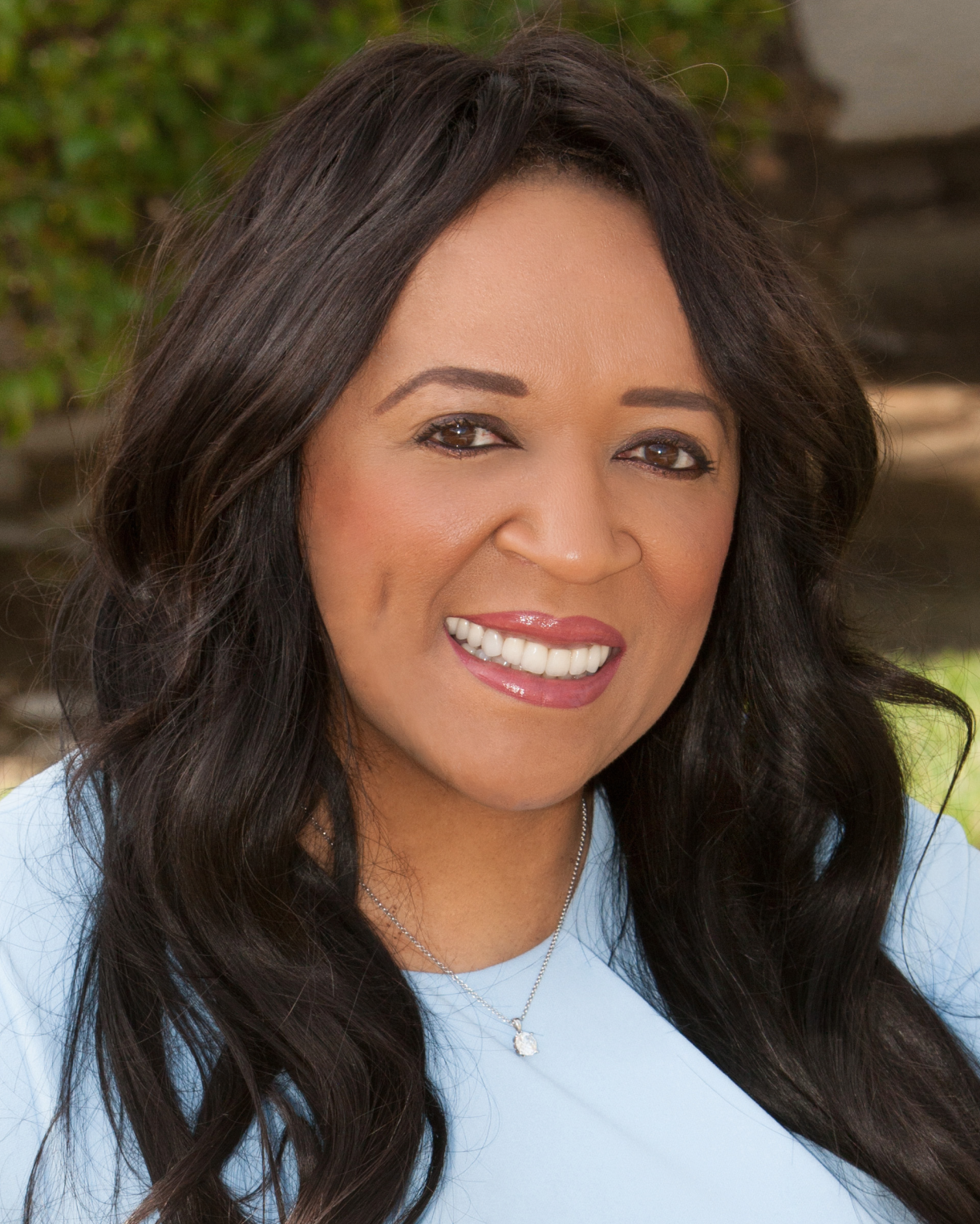
Candidate	Eleni Kounalakis	Angela Underwood Jacobs
Party	Democratic	Republican
Popular vote	6,418,119	4,332,602
Percentage	59.70%	40.30%
- Kounalakis: 50–60% 60–70% 70–80% 80–90% Jacobs: 50–60% 60–70% 70–80% 80–90%
Lieutenant Governor before election
Eleni Kounalakis
Democratic
Elected Lieutenant Governor
Eleni Kounalakis
Democratic

The 2022 California lieutenant gubernatorial election was held on November 8, 2022, to elect the lieutenant governor of the state of California. The election coincided with various other federal and state elections, including for Governor of California. The nonpartisan blanket primary was held on June 7. California is one of 21 states that elects its lieutenant governor separately from its governor.

Incumbent Democratic Lieutenant Governor Eleni Kounalakis won re-election to a second term with 59.7% of the vote, defeating her Republican challenger. This is the first time in history where both party nominees for this seat were women, and Jacobs was the first African-American woman in history to be nominated for this position.

== Candidates ==
A primary election was scheduled for June 7, 2022. Under California law, all candidates appear on the same ballot under a nonpartisan blanket primary, with the top two finishers advancing to the general election.

=== Democratic Party ===
==== Declared ====
- Eleni Kounalakis, incumbent lieutenant governor
- Jeffrey Highbear Morgan, businessman and engineer
- William Cavett "Skee" Saacke, attorney

==== Disqualified ====
- Roy Foreman, construction worker

=== Republican Party ===
==== Declared ====
- David Fennell, venture capitalist and candidate in 2018
- Angela Underwood Jacobs, deputy mayor of Lancaster
- Clint W. Saunders, mental health worker

=== Peace and Freedom Party ===
==== Declared ====
- Mohammad Arif, businessman

=== No Party Preference ===
==== Declared ====
- David Hillberg, mechanic and actor
- James Orlando Ogle, perennial candidate (write-in)

== Endorsements ==
Mohammed Arif (P&F)

Organizations

- Green Party of California
- Peace and Freedom Party
Angela Underwood Jacobs (R)

Organizations

- California Republican Party
Eleni Kounalakis (D)

Organizations

- California Democratic Party
- California Teachers Association
- Equality California
- NARAL Pro-Choice California
- Sierra Club
- Stonewall Democrats

== Primary election ==
=== Results ===
Results by county Kounalakis: 20–30%; 30–40%; 40–50%; 50–60%; 60–70%; 70–80%; Underwood Jacobs: 20–30%; 30–40%; Fennell: 20–30%; 30–40%

Primary election results
Party	Candidate	Votes	%
Democratic	Eleni Kounalakis (incumbent)	3,617,121	52.65%
Republican	Angela Underwood Jacobs	1,365,468	19.88%
Republican	David Fennell	922,493	13.43%
Republican	Clint W. Saunders	306,216	4.46%
Democratic	Jeffrey Highbear Morgan	229,121	3.33%
Peace and Freedom	Mohammad Arif	183,150	2.67%
Democratic	William Cavett Saacke	171,800	2.50%
No party preference	David Hillberg	74,289	1.08%
No party preference	James Orlando Ogle (write-in)	25	0.0%
Total votes		6,869,683	100.0%

== General election ==
=== Polling ===
Poll source	Date(s) administered	Sample size (Note: Key: A – all adults RV – registered voters LV – likely voters V – unclear)	Margin of error	Eleni Kounalakis (D)	Angela Underwood Jacobs (R)	Undecided
USC	October 30 – November 2, 2022	802 (RV)	± 3.5%	63%	37%	–

=== Results ===
2022 California lieutenant gubernatorial election
Party	Candidate	Votes	%	±%
Democratic	Eleni Kounalakis (incumbent)	6,418,119	59.70%	+2.54%
Republican	Angela Underwood Jacobs	4,332,602	40.30%	−2.54%
Total votes		10,750,721	100.00%	N/A
Democratic hold				

==== By county ====
County	Eleni Kounalakis Democratic		Angela Underwood Jacobs Republican		Margin		Total votes cast
County	#	%	#	%	#	%	Total votes cast
Alameda	381,066	79.37%	99,021	20.63%	282,045	58.75%	480,087
Alpine	366	60.20%	242	39.80%	124	20.39%	608
Amador	6,383	34.73%	11,994	65.27%	-5,611	-30.53%	18,377
Butte	32,611	45.53%	39,007	54.47%	-6,396	-8.93%	71,618
Calaveras	7,537	35.75%	13,547	64.25%	-6,010	-28.51%	21,084
Colusa	1,705	31.16%	3,767	68.84%	-2,062	-37.68%	5,472
Contra Costa	263,520	68.85%	119,225	31.15%	144,295	37.70%	382,745
Del Norte	3,367	40.73%	4,900	59.27%	-1,533	-18.54%	8,267
El Dorado	36,012	41.20%	51,394	58.80%	-15,382	-17.60%	87,406
Fresno	99,113	45.84%	117,094	54.16%	-17,981	-8.32%	216,207
Glenn	2,085	26.67%	5,734	73.33%	-3,649	-46.67%	7,819
Humboldt	30,026	63.34%	17,378	36.66%	12,648	26.68%	47,404
Imperial	16,243	55.07%	13,254	44.93%	2,989	10.13%	29,497
Inyo	3,416	46.43%	3,942	53.57%	-526	-7.15%	7,358
Kern	71,070	37.95%	116,218	62.05%	-45,148	-24.11%	187,288
Kings	9,565	35.91%	17,071	64.09%	-7,506	-28.18%	26,636
Lake	10,041	50.34%	9,907	49.66%	134	0.67%	19,948
Lassen	1,787	19.78%	7,247	80.22%	-5,460	-60.44%	9,034
Los Angeles	1,571,311	67.65%	751,342	32.35%	819,969	35.30%	2,322,653
Madera	13,451	36.84%	23,059	63.16%	-9,608	-26.32%	36,510
Marin	94,517	80.56%	22,814	19.44%	71,703	61.11%	117,331
Mariposa	3,023	38.94%	4,741	61.06%	-1,718	-22.13%	7,764
Mendocino	19,523	65.01%	10,507	34.99%	9,016	30.02%	30,030
Merced	25,413	46.74%	28,957	53.26%	-3,544	-6.52%	54,370
Modoc	779	23.44%	2,544	76.56%	-1,765	-53.11%	3,323
Mono	2,547	56.50%	1,961	43.50%	586	13.00%	4,508
Monterey	65,568	64.95%	35,381	35.05%	30,187	29.90%	100,949
Napa	32,569	65.83%	16,907	34.17%	15,662	31.66%	49,476
Nevada	27,522	54.78%	22,720	45.22%	4,802	9.56%	50,242
Orange	461,661	48.98%	480,963	51.02%	-19,302	-2.05%	942,624
Placer	76,478	42.44%	103,717	57.56%	-27,239	-15.12%	180,195
Plumas	3,345	39.12%	5,206	60.88%	-1,861	-21.76%	8,551
Riverside	283,695	48.20%	304,880	51.80%	-21,185	-3.60%	588,575
Sacramento	278,219	58.91%	194,032	41.09%	84,187	17.83%	472,251
San Benito	10,644	55.02%	8,702	44.98%	1,942	10.04%	19,346
San Bernardino	213,997	47.77%	234,019	52.23%	-20,022	-4.47%	448,016
San Diego	572,539	56.33%	443,933	43.67%	128,606	12.65%	1,016,472
San Francisco	246,398	84.37%	45,663	15.63%	200,735	68.73%	292,061
San Joaquin	87,975	50.00%	87,963	50.00%	12	0.01%	175,938
San Luis Obispo	62,504	52.96%	55,518	47.04%	6,986	5.92%	118,022
San Mateo	183,564	75.31%	60,177	24.69%	123,387	50.62%	243,741
Santa Barbara	80,698	60.51%	52,676	39.49%	28,022	21.01%	133,374
Santa Clara	375,311	70.27%	158,760	29.73%	216,551	40.55%	534,071
Santa Cruz	79,714	77.29%	23,422	22.71%	56,292	54.58%	103,136
Shasta	20,074	29.69%	47,534	70.31%	-27,460	-40.62%	67,608
Sierra	567	36.77%	975	63.23%	-408	-26.46%	1,542
Siskiyou	6,694	38.25%	10,807	61.75%	-4,113	-23.50%	17,501
Solano	78,831	60.79%	50,836	39.21%	27,995	21.59%	129,667
Sonoma	141,627	72.67%	53,259	27.33%	88,368	45.34%	194,886
Stanislaus	56,910	43.87%	72,811	56.13%	-15,901	-12.26%	129,721
Sutter	9,386	33.88%	18,314	66.12%	-8,928	-32.23%	27,700
Tehama	5,460	26.82%	14,900	73.18%	-9,440	-46.37%	20,360
Trinity	1,983	44.13%	2,511	55.87%	-528	-11.75%	4,494
Tulare	33,699	37.21%	56,870	62.79%	-23,171	-25.58%	90,569
Tuolumne	8,835	38.44%	14,148	61.56%	-5,313	-23.12%	22,983
Ventura	153,242	55.25%	124,094	44.75%	29,148	10.51%	277,336
Yolo	45,160	67.91%	21,342	32.09%	23,818	35.82%	66,502
Yuba	6,773	34.79%	12,695	65.21%	-5,922	-30.42%	19,468
Totals	6,418,119	59.70%	4,332,602	40.30%	2,085,517	19.40%	10,750,721

Counties that flipped from Republican to Democratic

- San Diego (largest city: San Diego)
- San Luis Obispo (largest city: San Luis Obispo)

==== By congressional district ====
Kounalakis won 39 of 52 congressional districts, with the remaining 13 going to Underwood Jacobs, including one that elected a Democrat.

District	Kounalakis	Underwood Jacobs	Representative
1st	35%	65%	Doug LaMalfa
2nd	72%	28%	Jared Huffman
3rd	45%	55%	Kevin Kiley
4th	65%	35%	Mike Thompson
5th	39%	61%	Tom McClintock
6th	56%	44%	Ami Bera
7th	65%	35%	Doris Matsui
8th	74%	26%	John Garamendi
9th	49%	51%	Josh Harder
10th	66%	34%	Mark DeSaulnier
11th	85%	15%	Nancy Pelosi
12th	90%	10%	Barbara Lee
13th	47%	53%	John Duarte
14th	69%	31%	Eric Swalwell
15th	75%	25%	Jackie Speier (117th Congress)
15th	75%	25%	Kevin Mullin (118th Congress)
16th	73%	27%	Anna Eshoo
17th	71%	29%	Ro Khanna
18th	66%	34%	Zoe Lofgren
19th	66%	34%	Jimmy Panetta
20th	32%	68%	Kevin McCarthy
21st	52%	48%	Jim Costa
22nd	49%	51%	David Valadao
23rd	40%	60%	Jay Obernolte
24th	60%	40%	Salud Carbajal
25th	52%	48%	Raul Ruiz
26th	54%	46%	Julia Brownley
27th	49%	51%	Mike Garcia
28th	63%	37%	Judy Chu
29th	72%	28%	Tony Cárdenas
30th	75%	25%	Adam Schiff
31st	59%	41%	Grace Napolitano
32nd	67%	33%	Brad Sherman
33rd	55%	45%	Pete Aguilar
34th	81%	19%	Jimmy Gomez
35th	55%	45%	Norma Torres
36th	68%	32%	Ted Lieu
37th	83%	17%	Karen Bass (117th Congress)
37th	83%	17%	Sydney Kamlager-Dove (118th Congress)
38th	58%	42%	Linda Sánchez
39th	55%	45%	Mark Takano
40th	45%	55%	Young Kim
41st	46%	54%	Ken Calvert
42nd	67%	33%	Lucille Roybal-Allard (117th Congress)
42nd	67%	33%	Robert Garcia (118th Congress)
43rd	76%	24%	Maxine Waters
44th	69%	31%	Nanette Barragán
45th	49%	51%	Michelle Steel
46th	60%	40%	Lou Correa
47th	50.3%	49.7%	Katie Porter
48th	39%	61%	Darrell Issa
49th	51%	49%	Mike Levin
50th	62%	38%	Scott Peters
51st	60%	40%	Sara Jacobs
52nd	63%	37%	Juan Vargas
