= Marcus Stern (journalist) =

American journalist

- Born: April 30, 1953 (age 72)
- Occupation: Journalist
- Known for: Breaking the story about Duke Cunningham's corruption

Marcus Stern (born April 30, 1953) is an American journalist who worked for the Copley News Service for nearly 25 years. In 2005 he launched the investigation that led to the bribery conviction of Congressman Randy "Duke" Cunningham, a Republican from San Diego County, California. His reporting won a Pulitzer Prize in 2006.

== Early life and education ==
Journalism ran in Stern's family. His grandfather August "Gus" Stern was a copy editor at the Washington Post. His father Laurence Marcus "Larry" Stern also worked at the Washington Post, becoming assistant managing editor for national news.

Marcus Stern attended Woodrow Wilson High School (Washington, D.C.) and graduated from the University of California, Los Angeles in 1977 with a bachelor's degree in psychology.

== Reporting career ==
After using his psychology degree to work in several psychiatric hospitals, he turned to journalism at age 26. He worked for the San Pedro News-Pilot in California and the States News Service in Washington, D.C. In 1983 he landed a job covering the Los Angeles area from the Copley News Service's Washington bureau. During the 1990s he wrote extensively about immigration issues. That coverage won him the Raymond Clapper Memorial Award (1997), the Katz Award (1998) from the Center for Immigration Studies, and the James Aronson Award (1999) for the story "America's Immigration Dilemma". During the early 2000s he often reported from combat and disaster zones including Haiti, Iraq and Afghanistan.

He worked at the Copley News Service Washington bureau until 2007; the bureau closed in 2008. He then worked for ProPublica and Thomson Reuters. He is currently an investigative researcher for Strategic Research.

He earned the 2017 Gerald Loeb Award for Video for his contributions to "Cosecha de Miseria (Harvest of Misery) & The Source".

== Cunningham story ==
Stern stumbled across the Cunningham story while looking into congressional travel; unable to explain some of Cunningham's trips abroad, he did a "lifestyle audit" of Cunningham's finances and discovered a suspicious sale of Cunningham's home to a defense contractor for an inflated price. His story, published in the San Diego Union-Tribune on June 12, 2005, did not involve any insider leaks or unnamed sources; it was all based on publicly available information such as real estate sales and company websites. Stern went on to write multiple articles about Cunningham's finances and associates, usually with the assistance of Pulitzer co-winner Jerry Kammer in San Diego.

The stories resulted in government investigations, which ultimately led to the exposure of sweetheart deals and outright bribery involving Cunningham and defense contractors whose interests he supported in Congress. "Without Marc Stern's story there might not have been a Cunningham case," said Assistant U.S. Attorney Phillip Halpern, one of the lead prosecutors. He considered Stern the "genesis of the investigation" and added "This is the first time in my [25-year] career I have predicated a case upon a news story."

On July 14, just one month after Stern's first story, Cunningham announced he would not run for re-election, and in November he pleaded guilty to tax evasion, conspiracy to commit bribery, mail fraud and wire fraud in federal court in San Diego.

Stern and Kammer were cited by name in the 2006 Pulitzer Prize for National Reporting award given to the San Diego Union-Tribune and the Copley News Service. In 2005, Stern and Kammer, together with Union-Tribune reporter Dean Calbreath, also shared the Polk Award for political reporting. Stern and Kammer also shared the 2006 Edgar A. Poe Award for excellence in news of national and regional importance, given by the White House Correspondents Association.

Stern and his colleagues later wrote a book about the Cunningham affair, The Wrong Stuff: The extraordinary saga of Randy "Duke" Cunningham, the most corrupt congressman ever caught.
