= Bryan Wagner (American football) =

American football player (born 1962)

No. 15, 8, 9
- Position: Punter

Personal information
- Born: March 28, 1962 (age 64); Escondido, California, U.S.
- Listed height: 6 ft 2 in (1.88 m)
- Listed weight: 200 lb (91 kg)

Career information
- High school: Hilltop (Chula Vista, California)
- College: Cal Lutheran; Cal State Northridge
- NFL draft: 1985: undrafted

Career history

Playing
- Dallas Cowboys (1985)*; New York Giants (1986)*; St. Louis Cardinals (1986)*; Denver Broncos (1987)*; Chicago Bears (1987–1988); Cleveland Browns (1989–1990); New England Patriots (1991); Green Bay Packers (1992–1993); San Diego Chargers (1994); New York Jets (1995)*; New England Patriots (1995); Detroit Lions (1996)*
- * Offseason or practice squad member only

Coaching
- Chippewa HS (OH) (2005–2006) Head coach; Sweetwater HS (CA) (2017–2020) Head coach; Hilltop HS (CA) (2021–present) Head coach

Awards and highlights
- NFL punting yards leader (1989)

Career NFL statistics
- Punts: 506
- Punting yards: 20,645
- Punting average: 40.8
- Longest punt: 71
- Inside 20: 134
- Stats at Pro Football Reference

Bryan Jeffrey Wagner (born March 28, 1962) is an American former professional football player who was a punter in the National Football League (NFL) for the Chicago Bears, the Cleveland Browns, the New England Patriots, the Green Bay Packers and San Diego Chargers. He played college football for the Cal Lutheran Kingsmen before transferring to Cal State Northridge Matadors.

== Early life ==
Wagner attended Hilltop High School, where he played football, soccer and baseball. He began his collegiate career at California Lutheran University. He later transferred to California State University, Northridge, where he was the starter at quarterback and punter.

== Professional career ==
After the 1985 NFL draft, Wagner was signed as an undrafted free agent by the Dallas Cowboys. He was also selected by the Baltimore Stars in the 15th round (216th overall) of the 1985 USFL draft. He was waived by the Cowboys on August 27.

In May 1986, he signed with the New York Giants. He was released on August 11. On August 20, 1986, he signed with the St. Louis Cardinals. He was released before the start of the season, on August 26.

In 1987, he was signed as a free agent by the Denver Broncos. On August 25, he was traded to the Chicago Bears in exchange for guard Stefan Humphries. He replaced the Bears' punter Maury Buford, until Tommy Barnhardt took the role from Wagner later in the season. On October 30, 1988, he had a 70-yard punt against the New England Patriots. He played in the historic Fog Bowl against the Philadelphia Eagles.

In 1990, he set a Cleveland Browns record with four punts blocked in a single season, including 2 in one game against the Kansas City Chiefs. He averaged 38.9 yards per punt with a net average of 30.9 yards.

In 1991, he played in 3 games with the New England Patriots, until being released after a punt from his end zone hit teammate Eugene Lockhart's back and was recovered for a touchdown by the Pittsburgh Steelers' Ernie Mills.

In 1992, he signed with the Green Bay Packers and was released on August 24. On November 9, he was re-signed by the Packers.

On May 6, 1994, he re-signed with the Packers but was released before the start of the season, on August 21. In 1994, he signed with the San Diego Chargers. He set a Super Bowl record by averaging 48.8 yards per punt. He chose not to re-sign with the Chargers for the 1995 season and Australian rules football player Darren Bennett took over the punting job.

In 1995, he signed with the New York Jets and was released on August 21, after not being able to pass Brian Hansen on the depth chart. In November, he signed with the New England Patriots, taking over after Pat O'Neill was released. He was not re-signed after the season.

In 1996, he signed with the Detroit Lions and was released on July 3 to make room for punter Rich Camarillo.

== NFL career statistics ==
Legend
	Led the league
**Bold**	Career high

=== Regular season ===
Year	Team	Punting									
Year	Team	GP	Punts	Yds	Net Yds	Lng	Avg	Net Avg	Blk	Ins20	TB
1987	CHI	10	36	1,461	1,186	**71**	40.6	32.1	1	9	4
1988	CHI	**16**	79	3,282	2,635	70	41.5	33.4	0	18	**10**
1989	CLE	**16**	**97**	**3,817**	**3,279**	60	39.4	33.8	0	**32**	6
1990	CLE	**16**	74	2,879	2,414	65	38.9	30.9	**4**	13	2
1991	NWE	3	14	548	408	54	39.1	29.1	0	0	0
1992	GNB	7	30	1,222	1,049	52	40.7	35.0	0	10	5
1993	GNB	**16**	74	3,174	2,684	60	**42.9**	**36.3**	0	19	7
1994	SDG	14	65	2,705	2,297	59	41.6	35.3	0	20	3
1995	NWE	8	37	1,557	1,309	57	42.1	35.4	0	13	4
Career		106	506	20,645	17,261	71	40.8	33.8	5	134	41

=== Playoffs ===
Year	Team	Punting									
Year	Team	GP	Punts	Yds	Net Yds	Lng	Avg	Net Avg	Blk	Ins20	TB
1988	CHI	2	9	306	279	48	34.0	31.0	0	**2**	0
1989	CLE	2	**11**	451	391	52	41.0	35.5	0	1	**1**
1993	GNB	2	7	278	242	51	39.7	34.6	0	1	0
1994	SDG	**3**	**11**	**474**	**438**	**55**	**43.1**	**39.8**	0	**2**	0
Career		9	38	1,509	1,350	55	39.7	35.5	0	6	1

== Personal life ==
Wagner married Cleveland TV news anchor and personality Robin Swoboda in 1991; they divorced in 2015. Wagner taught physical education and coached sports (football and basketball) at Willetts Middle School in Brunswick, Ohio.

On April 27, 2005, Wagner was hired as the football head coach at Chippewa High School and announced his resignation on November 20, 2006. In 2017, he was hired as the football head coach at Sweetwater High School in National City, California. Wagner compiled an 8–33 record in four seasons with the Red Devils. In 2020, he was hired as the head football coach at his alma mater, Hilltop High School in Chula Vista, California.
