= Cunningham scandal =

The Cunningham scandal was a U.S. political scandal in which defense contractors paid bribes to members of Congress and officials in the U.S. Defense Department, in return for political favors in the form of federal contracts. Most notable amongst the recipients of the bribes was California Congressman Duke Cunningham who pleaded guilty to receiving over $2.3 million in bribes. The primary defense contractors were Mitchell Wade (owner of MZM) and Brent R. Wilkes (owner of ADCS Inc.).

== Bribery scandal details ==
=== Mitchell Wade ===
In June 2005 it was revealed that Wade had bought Cunningham's house in Del Mar for $1,675,000. A month later, Wade placed it back on the market where it remained unsold for 8 months until the price was reduced to $975,000. Cunningham was a member of the Defense Appropriations Subcommittee; soon after the purchase, Wade began to receive tens of millions of dollars' worth of defense and intelligence contracts.

Later in June, it was further reported that the yacht that Cunningham lived on while he was in Washington was owned by Wade, and that Cunningham was paying only for maintenance, not rent. The Federal Bureau of Investigation launched an investigation regarding the real estate transaction. Cunningham's home, MZM's corporate offices, and Wade's home were all simultaneously raided by a number of federal agencies with warrants on July 1, 2005.

The money and favors provided to Cunningham were in exchange for helping win Pentagon work. "Government procurement records show that MZM, which Wade started in 1993, did not report any revenue from prime contract awards until 2003", but starting in May 2002 they were awarded contracts in the tens of millions of dollars which then grew to well over $150 million.

"Prosecutors also laid out a second, separate conspiracy in which Wade was alleged to have paid bribes to a Defense Department official and other employees in return for their help in awarding contracts to his company. Wade pleaded guilty to this scheme as well. The Pentagon employees were not named in court filings."

On April 27, 2006, Scot J. Patrow, writing for The Wall Street Journal, reported prosecutors were investigating whether other members of Congress or their staff received the services of prostitutes provided at Cunningham's request by Mitchell Wade. Patrow also reported that Brent R. Wilkes had indicated that he would fight any charges. Wade implicated Wilkes in the prostitution scheme.

=== Brent Wilkes ===
In 1995 Brent R. Wilkes started ADCS Inc. ("Automated Document Conversion Systems"). With Cunningham's help, he began winning contracts from the Pentagon.

As The Washington Post put it, "Wilkes was an obscure California contractor and lobbyist until his name surfaced last year as one of two defense contractors alleged to have given Cunningham $2.4 million in cash and other benefits in return for Cunningham's steering government business their way. One of Wilkes's companies received more than $80 million in Pentagon contracts over the past decade that stemmed from earmarks that Cunningham slipped into spending bills."

"He snared a $1 million Pentagon contract in 1997, which Cunningham proclaimed "an asset" to San Diego. In 1999, ADCS was awarded a $9.7 million contract to convert documents in Panama. Subsequently, the company began collecting more than $20 million a year in defense business."

In return, Wilkes rented hospitality suites at the Watergate Hotel and at the Westin Grand Hotel for Cunningham and other legislators and their guests. Wilkes hired Shirlington Limousine & Transportation Service of Virginia, starting in 1990, for entertainment at the Watergate Hotel. In 2005, the Department of Homeland Security granted Shirlington a $21 million contract. According to reports in the Wall Street Journal and the San Diego Union-Tribune, prostitutes regularly accompanied guests at the suites.

However, "[t]he military never asked for the ADCS projects. In fact, in 2000 the Pentagon's inspector general blasted the company's biggest project, a $9.7 million contract to convert documents in Panama. The report said the program was created under pressure from two congressmen, whom Pentagon procurement officials have identified as Cunningham and Duncan Hunter (R-Calif), chairman of the Armed Services Committee," to whom Wilkes had also donated heavily.

== Other members of Congress involved ==
Reuters reported:

In violation of campaign-finance laws, Wade was found to have reimbursed employees at his company, MZM Inc., who made campaign contributions to two other members of Congress.

Campaign-finance records show that those lawmakers were Virginia Republican Rep. Virgil Goode and Florida Republican Rep. Katherine Harris. The charges indicate Wade did not inform either one that the contributions were unlawful.

A spokeswoman for Harris, who as Florida's secretary of state played a key role in the 2000 disputed presidential election between George W. Bush and Al Gore, said she had given the $52,000 she received from MZM employees to charity.

A spokesman for Goode was not immediately available for comment. According to the charges he received at least $46,000 in illegal contributions from MZM.

MZM operates several facilities in Goode's south-central Virginia district, including one that conducts background checks on foreign-owned defense contractors.

The Washington Post reported: "The congressman identifiable as Goode received $46,000 in such disguised contributions in 2003 and 2005, the court papers said. That was part of about $90,000 Wade and his workers contributed to Goode. Wade then asked the member to request appropriations for an MZM facility in his district, the Wade papers said, and a Goode staff member confirmed to Wade that the bill would include $9 million in funding."

The paper also noted: "The member identifiable as Harris received $32,000 in illegal donations from Wade and his employees in 2004. Documents filed with Wade's plea say that he took Harris to dinner early last year, where they discussed the possibility of another fundraiser and the possibility of getting funding for a Navy counterintelligence program in the member's district. One source familiar with the inquiry said Harris made such a request for funding, but it was not granted."
