= Brent R. Wilkes =

American businessman

- Born: Brent Roger Wilkes; May 21, 1954 (age 72); Chula Vista, California, U.S.
- Occupations: Entrepreneur, Defense Contractor
- Known for: Duke Cunningham defense contracting scandal
- Status: Released; September 2022
- Convictions: Bribery, conspiracy, money laundering
- Penalty: 12 years in federal prison

Details
- Imprisoned at: FCI Terminal Island

Brent Roger Wilkes (born May 21, 1954), is an American entrepreneur, defense contractor, and convicted felon, known for his involvement with the Duke Cunningham defense contracting scandal.

Wilkes was convicted on 13 counts on November 5, 2007. On March 27, 2008, the Court of Appeals ordered him released on bail pending appeal, finding in part "that the appeal raises a 'substantial question' of law or fact likely to result in reversal, a new trial or a sentence not including a term of prison". On January 6, 2009, after serving eleven months in federal custody, the last six months at Federal Correctional Institution, Terminal Island, Wilkes was released, pending appeal. Wilkes lost his appeals and was released in September 2022.

== Personal and business ==
Wilkes grew up in a San Diego suburb, Chula Vista, and graduated from San Diego State University in 1977 with a Bachelor of Science degree in accounting and having completed his course work for an MBA with a concentration in Taxation. He then became a CPA while working for Arthur Andersen & Co., an international public accounting firm, in San Diego. He subsequently joined Deloitte Haskins & Sells in their Washington D.C. practice office before leaving public accounting to become the president of a D.C. based real estate development company. Later, he became consultant for a Southern California software company that was seeking federal contracts for converting paper documents to digital ones. He was George W. Bush's finance co-chairman in California, and also involved in Arnold Schwarzenegger's campaign for governor. But it was as a federal contractor that he became involved with the Duke Cunningham bribery scandal. Wilkes was then living in Poway, California.

== Corruption allegations ==
As The Washington Post put it, "Wilkes was an obscure California contractor and lobbyist until his name surfaced last year as one of two defense contractors alleged to have given Cunningham $2.4 million in cash and other benefits in return for Cunningham's steering government business their way. One of Wilkes's companies received more than $80 million in Pentagon contracts over the past decade that stemmed from earmarks that Cunningham slipped into spending bills."

=== Benefits to Wilkes ===
In 1995 Wilkes started ADCS Inc., or "Automated Document Conversion Systems." With the help of many congressmen including Cunningham, he began winning contracts from the Pentagon. Wilkes got a $1 million Pentagon contract in 1997, which Cunningham proclaimed "an asset" to San Diego. In 1999, ADCS, Inc. was awarded a $9.7 million contract to convert documents related to the Panama Canal Zone. Subsequently, the company began collecting more than $20 million a year in defense business."

In 2000, a report by the Pentagon's inspector general said of the company's biggest project, a $9.7 million contract to convert documents in Panama, that the program was created under pressure from two congressmen. Pentagon procurement officials identified the two as Cunningham and Duncan Hunter (R-Calif), chairman of the Armed Services Committee, to whom Wilkes had also donated heavily. The two senior Pentagon officials who initiated the investigation, Lou Kratz and Gary Jones, later confirmed that the project was initiated at the request of Pentagon project manager Anne Barnes and was a requirement of the Panama treaty accords. Neither Wilkes, his companies nor any congressman played a role in initiating this project which was an obligation of the U.S. under the treaty.

=== Defense technology companies ===
After the release of the Pentagon report which criticized ADCS, Wilkes and a business associate, Max Gelwix, established the defense technology contractor PerfectWave Technologies LLC, in Poway, which was trying to use sound isolation technology to delete background noise from radio communications, and to improve the capability of ground penetrating radar with signal processing techniques. The company completed and delivered a signal processing algorithm in a chip set to eliminate background noise in the helmets of the crews of the Light Armored Vehicle (LAV) and the Abrams main battle tank. In addition substantial progress had been made on an application which allowed ground penetrating radar to locate and identify improvised explosive devices (IED).

PerfectWave was connected to a lobbying scandal with republican congressmen Tom DeLay (R-Texas), John Doolittle (R-Calif.) and Devin Nunes. In June 2004, PerfectWave paid for the legislative directors for Doolittle and Nunes to travel to San Diego to visit the company. Subpoenas later showed that there was a $15,000 donation made to Texans for a Republican Majority, and $40,000 to a gala tribute to Duke Cunningham.

AP reported that "Wilkes has been subpoenaed in the money-laundering case against former House Majority Leader Tom DeLay. Prosecutors want to hear from Wilkes about a contribution to a DeLay fundraising committee at the center of the investigation that led to indictments that pushed the GOP leader from office". Additionally, as noted above, Wilkes' company, Group W Advisers, hired the Alexander Strategy Group that employed DeLay's wife to lobby for acoustic technology for the Navy.

Doolittle acknowledges steering money to PerfectWave but denies doing anything wrong. In a statement last month, he said his backing for PerfectWave was "based solely on the project's merits and the written support of the military.' But the only evidence Doolittle's office could provide to show military support for the project was a letter of praise from Robert Lusardi, a program manager for light armored vehicles at the Marine Corps dated February 25 – two and a half years after PerfectWave got its first earmark. By the time Lusardi wrote his letter, the company had received at least $37 million in earmarks."

=== Favors from Wilkes ===
The Wall Street Journal, citing an anonymous source reported that Wilkes rented hospitality suites at the Watergate Hotel and at the Westin Grand Hotel for Cunningham and other legislators and their guests. According to the same anonymous source Wilkes hired Shirlington Limousine & Transportation Service of Virginia beginning in 1990 for entertainment at the Watergate Hotel. In 2005, the Department of Homeland Security granted Shirlington a $21 million contract. According to these same reports in The Wall Street Journal and the San Diego Union-Tribune, prostitutes regularly accompanied guests at the suites. Allegedly, admitted Cunningham briber Mitchell Wade told prosecutors that Wilkes had set up a prostitution ring through Shirlington and would procure prostitutes for Cunningham on demand. Despite intensive investigations by federal agents involving interviews with hotel employees, escort services, prostitutes and all known participants in these poker games no evidence or testimony has been found to corroborate these anonymous allegations. Further, the alleged source of the allegations, Mitch Wade was not asked about these allegations during trial.

=== Criminal proceedings ===
On November 28, 2005, Cunningham pleaded guilty, and on March 3, 2006, U.S. District Judge Larry Alan Burns sentenced Cunningham to 100 months (eight years and four months) in prison, the longest ever given to a former member of Congress. The plea agreement mentioned four co-conspirators along with Cunningham: Wilkes, Mitchell Wade; New York businessman Thomas Kontogiannis (whom United States Coast Guard records show was involved in a questionable boat deal with Cunningham); and John T. Michael, Kontogiannis' nephew. The nephew is the owner of a New York-based mortgage company Coastal Capital Corp. Property records show the company made $1.15 million in real estate loans to Cunningham, two of which were used in the purchase of his Rancho Santa Fe mansion. Court records show that Wade paid off one of those loans.

On February 13, 2007, Wilkes and Foggo were indicted on ten charges of conspiracy. In addition, Wilkes was indicted on charges of conspiracy, bribery, money laundering and unlawful monetary transactions to Cunningham in return for government contracts.

On May 10, 2007, Wilkes, Foggo and Michael were indicted on new charges which superseded the previous indictments. Wilkes and Foggo were charged with thirty counts of fraud, conspiracy and money laundering. In addition Michael was added to the indictment against Wilkes for bribing Cunningham.

On November 5, 2007, Wilkes was convicted of 13 felonies for bribing former congressman Randy “Duke” Cunningham with expensive meals, trips, a yacht and mortgage payments for his Rancho Santa Fe mansion in exchange for lucrative government defense contracts.

On January 21, 2008, Federal Probation Officials recommended a 60-year sentence. Wilkes was scheduled to be sentenced on January 21, but that has been put off until February 19 at the request of his lawyer, Mark Geragos. In court papers, Geragos said he needed more time to analyze and challenge the report from the federal probation office, which he received January 15 – later than required under court rules.

On February 19, 2008, Wilkes was sentenced to 12 years in federal prison, a term much shorter than the sentence recommended by the prosecution.

On March 27, 2008, the United States Court of Appeals for the Ninth Circuit issued an ORDER as follows: "Appellant's (Wilkes) motion for bail pending appeal is granted. Appellant has shown, by clear and convincing evidence, that appellant is not likely to flee or pose a danger to the safety of any other person or the community if released and has also shown that the appeal raises a "substantial question" of law or fact that is likely to result in reversal, an order for a new trial, or a sentence that does not include a term of imprisonment, on all counts on which imprisonment has been imposed. The matter has been remanded to the district court for the limited purpose of establishing appropriate conditions of release."

=== Representative Lewis ===
Wilkes also hired the lobbying firm of Copeland Lowery Jacquez Denton & White, where former U.S. Congressman Bill Lowery was a partner from 1993 to 2006. Lowery was close friends with Congressman Jerry Lewis (R-CA).

Since 1993, Wilkes and his associates gave Lewis $88,000 in contributions; Lewis subsequently gave $56,000 of that to Habitat for Humanity. Wilkes paid Copeland Lowery at least $385,000 in fees; by 2005, the firm's fees had increased to $25,000 a month.

In January 1999, Lewis became chairman of the Defense Appropriations Subcommittee. In January 2005 he became chairman of the House Appropriations Committee.

In an August 2006 interview, Wilkes said he considered dropping the firm, but that Lowery threatened to block future projects if their relationship ended. Wilkes said Lowery had warned several times that doing so could prompt Lewis to cut off earmarks, saying, “You don’t want me telling those guys on the committee that you are moving on without me.” That meant, Wilkes said, "I’d be out of business."

In early 2006, Lewis has said that he barely knew Wilkes and that he did not remember seeing him in nearly a decade. But Wilkes says their relationship was closer than that. Ever since they went on a scuba-diving trip together in 1993, he said, Lewis had referred to him as his "diving buddy." They occasionally dined together or met at political functions, Wilkes said. At a Las Vegas fund-raiser in April 2005, Wilkes said, Lewis greeted him as "Brento" and hugged him as Wilkes surprised Lewis with $25,000 in campaign contributions.

=== Custody status ===
Wilkes was an inmate at the FCI Bastrop in Bastrop, Texas and was to remain there until December 9, 2023. A search on the Federal Bureau of Prisons website, however, shows Wilkes was released on September 16, 2022.

=== Involvement with the CIA ===
In March 2006 the CIA announced that it was investigating the connection between Wilkes and the agency's No. 3 official, Kyle "Dusty" Foggo, and whether Foggo helped Wilkes gain CIA contracts. By May, it was reported the FBI was also investigating. The reports were confirmed by a May 12, 2006, raid on his Vienna, Virginia, home.

Foggo and Wilkes attended school together at Hilltop High School in Chula Vista and San Diego State University, served as best men in each other's weddings, named their sons after each other, and shared a wine locker at the Capital Grille in Washington D.C., a favorite lobbyists' retreat.

Speaking on CNN, former Congressman Bob Barr (R-GA) suggested the corruption scandal as a possible reason behind CIA director Porter Goss's resignation.

In May, the day after Goss' resignation, New York Daily News reported

The investigations have focused on the Watergate poker parties thrown by defense contractor Brent Wilkes, a high-school buddy of Foggo's, that were attended by disgraced former Rep. Randy (Duke) Cunningham and other lawmakers.

Foggo has claimed he went to the parties "just for poker" amid allegations that Wilkes, a top GOP fund-raiser and a member of the $100,000 "Pioneers" of Bush's 2004 reelection campaign, provided prostitutes, limos and hotel suites to Cunningham....

Wilkes hosted regular parties for 15 years at the Watergate and Westin Grand Hotels for lawmakers and lobbyists. Intelligence sources said Goss has denied attending the parties as CIA director, but that left open whether he may have attended as a Republican congressman from Florida who was head of the House Intelligence Committee.

The allegations of prostitutes attending poker games hosted by Wilkes came from anonymous federal sources and have never been confirmed nor has the source of the rumors ever been identified. Shirlington Limousine filed suit against the Washington Post alleging libel for repeating the allegations that the company or its employees were somehow involved. Shirlington received a settlement of an undisclosed amount and a retraction of the allegation.

=== Illegal contributions in Mayoral race ===
In November 2005, the California state's watchdog agency, the Fair Political Practices Commission, filed a complaint against Wilkes. The substance of the complaint is that Wilkes attempted to circumvent San Diego's limit on individual campaign contributions with "straw contributions" (i.e., reimbursing others for their contributions). The complaint noted that 22 of his employees as ADCS or relatives of his employees gave $250 each to the 2002 San Diego mayoral campaign of Ron Roberts. The complaint was not released until July 2006 after receiving a public-records act request. This was neither a criminal or civil complaint but rather an administrative action. The complaint was based on the alleged statement of a former employee who was purported to state that her contribution was reimbursed by someone at ADCS. The employee claims that she never made such a statement and that she was not reimbursed. There were no other allegation among the dozens of other contributions investigated.
