= Mitchell Wade =

American defence contractor

Mitchell J. Wade
- Born: June 6, 1963 (age 62)
- Education: American University
- Occupation: Defense contractor
- Known for: Implication in the Cunningham scandal
- Criminal charges: Bribery
- Criminal penalty: 30 months imprisonment

Mitchell J. Wade (born June 6, 1963) is an American defense contractor implicated in the events that led to the 2005 resignation of U.S. Representative Randy "Duke" Cunningham.

Wade founded the defense contracting firm MZM Inc. (since renamed Athena Innovative Solutions Inc.), in 1993. On February 24, 2006, he pleaded guilty to paying then Rep. Randy "Duke" Cunningham (R. Calif.) more than $1 million in bribes in exchange for millions more in government contracts. Wade was one of four co-conspirators mentioned in Cunningham's plea agreement of November 28, 2005. In addition to Wade, the three other co-conspirators are: Brent R. Wilkes, founder of San Diego–based ADCS Inc.; New York businessman Thomas Kontogiannis; and John T. Michael, Kontogiannis' nephew.

== Personal life ==
Wade graduated from American University. He married Christiane D. Shipley on June 6, 1999. Shipley graduated from Wake Forest University in 1990. Wade has three children from a previous marriage, Matthew, Zachary and Morgan, and two with Shipley. The Wades used to live in Great Falls, Virginia.

== Career ==
Initially he worked as a bureaucrat at The Pentagon, then formed his own defense-contracting firm MZM, Inc., which was later embroiled in scandal. Wade named MZM after his children: Matthew, Zachary and Morgan.

Wade also served in the Naval Reserve.

== Bribery scandal details ==
In June 2005, it was revealed that Wade had bought Cunningham's house in Del Mar, California for $1,675,000. A month later, Wade placed it back on the market where it remained unsold for eight months until the price was reduced to $975,000. Cunningham was a member of the Defense Appropriations Subcommittee and shortly after the purchase, Wade began to receive tens of millions of dollars' worth of defense and intelligence contracts.

Later in June, it was further reported that the yacht that Cunningham lived on while he was in Washington was owned by Wade, and that Cunningham was paying only for maintenance, not rent. The Federal Bureau of Investigation launched an investigation regarding the real estate transaction. Cunningham's home, MZM's Corporate Offices and Wade's home were all simultaneously raided by a number of federal agencies with warrants on July 1, 2005.

The money and favors provided to Cunningham were in exchange for helping win Pentagon work. Government procurement records show that MZM, which Wade started in 1993, did not report any revenue from prime contract awards until 2003, but starting in May 2002 they were awarded contracts in the tens of millions of dollars which then grew to well over $150 million.

"Prosecutors also laid out a second, separate conspiracy in which Wade was alleged to have paid bribes to a Defense Department official and other employees in return for their help in awarding contracts to his company. Wade pleaded guilty to this scheme as well. The Pentagon employees were not named in court filings."

Wade was sentenced to 30 months in prison in December of 2008. He was released from federal prison on April 13, 2011.

== Other Members of Congress involved ==
Reuters reported

In violation of campaign-finance laws, Wade was found to have reimbursed employees at his company, MZM Inc., who made campaign contributions to two other members of Congress.

Campaign-finance records show that those lawmakers were Virginia Republican Rep. Virgil Goode and Florida Republican Rep. Katherine Harris. The charges indicate Wade did not inform either one that the contributions were unlawful.

A spokeswoman for Harris, who as Florida's secretary of state played a key role in the 2000 disputed presidential election between George W. Bush and Al Gore, said she had given the $52,000 she received from MZM employees to charity.

A spokesman for Goode was not immediately available for comment. According to the charges he received at least $46,000 in illegal contributions from MZM.

MZM operates several facilities in Goode's south-central Virginia district, including one that conducts background checks on foreign-owned defense contractors.

The Washington Post reported: "The congressman identifiable as Goode received $46,000 in such disguised contributions in 2003 and 2005, the court papers said. That was part of about $90,000 Wade and his workers contributed to Goode. Wade then asked the member to request appropriations for an MZM facility in his district, the Wade papers said, and a Goode staff member confirmed to Wade that the bill would include $9 million in funding."

The paper also noted: "The member identifiable as Harris received $32,000 in illegal donations from Wade and his employees in 2004. Documents filed with Wade's plea say that he took Harris to dinner early last year, where they discussed the possibility of another fundraiser and the possibility of getting funding for a Navy counterintelligence program in the member's district. One source familiar with the inquiry said Harris made such a request for funding, but it was not granted."

Mitchell Wade also contributed to the following political persons:

- RNC (Republican National Committee)
- John F. Kerry (D)
- DNC Services Corporation (Democratic National Committee)
- Robert L. Barr, Jr. (R) Georgia
- Elizabeth Dole (R) North Carolina
- Larry Craig (R) Idaho
- Steve Chabot (R) Ohio
- Zach Wamp (R) Tennessee
- Duncan Hunter (R) California
- Devin Gerald Nunes (R) California
- Jerry Lewis (R) California
- Robert Ney (R) Ohio
- John William Warner (R) Virginia
- C. W. Bill Young (R) Florida
- National Republican Senatorial Committee
- John Davidson the IV Rockefeller (D) West Virginia
- Richard G Renzi (R) Arizona
- Mario Diaz-Balart (R) Florida
- Floyd Davidson Spence (R) South Carolina
- John Murtha (D) Pennsylvania

All the above are verifiable at fec.gov
