= Duke Cunningham =

American politician and jet fighter ace (1941–2025)

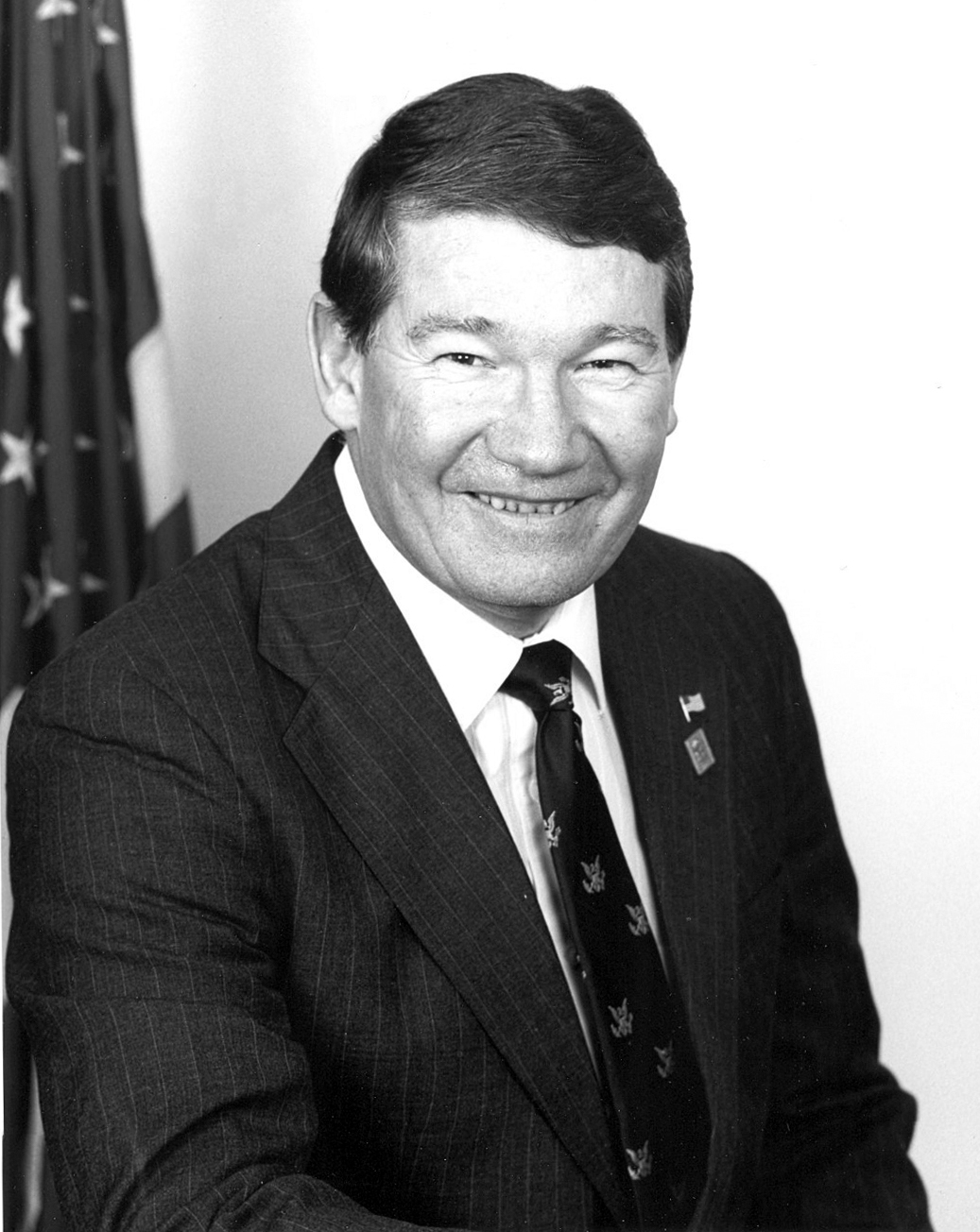
- Official portrait, 1992

Member of the U.S. House of Representatives from California
- In office January 3, 1991 – December 1, 2005
- Preceded by: Jim Bates
- Succeeded by: Brian Bilbray
- Constituency: 44th district (1991–1993); 51st district (1993–2003); 50th district (2003–2005)

Personal details
- Born: Randall Harold Cunningham; December 8, 1941 Los Angeles, California, U.S.
- Died: August 27, 2025 (aged 83) Little Rock, Arkansas, U.S.
- Party: Republican
- Spouses: Susan Albrecht (m. 1965; div. 1973); Nancy Jones (m. 1974; div. 2005); Sharon Stone (m. 2021)
- Children: 3
- Education: University of Missouri (BA, MA); National University (MBA)

Military service
- Branch: United States Navy
- Service years: 1967–1987
- Rank: Commander
- Conflict: Vietnam War
- Awards: Navy Cross; Silver Star (2); Purple Heart; Air Medal (15)
- Cunningham's voice Cunningham on the House Intelligence Committee's work on FY2004 intelligence authorization legislation. Recorded June 25, 2003

Randall Harold "Duke" Cunningham (December 8, 1941 – August 27, 2025) was an American politician, Vietnam War veteran and fighter ace. A member of the Republican Party, Cunningham represented three California districts in the United States House of Representatives from 1991 to 2005, and later served prison time for accepting bribes from defense contractors.

Prior to his political career, Cunningham was an officer and pilot in the United States Navy for 20 years. Following the Vietnam War, during which he became one of just two Navy aviators to be confirmed as aces, Cunningham became an instructor at the Navy's Fighter Weapons School (better known as TOPGUN) and commanding officer of Fighter Squadron 126 (VF-126), a shore-based adversary squadron at NAS Miramar, California.

In 1990, Cunningham ran for the U.S. House of Representatives, defeating Democratic incumbent Jim Bates. He served in the House from 1991 to 2005, as the representative for California's 44th, 50th, and 51st congressional districts. Cunningham resigned from the House on November 28, 2005, after pleading guilty to accepting at least $2.4 million in bribes and under-reporting his taxable income for 2004. He was sentenced to eight years and four months in prison and was ordered to pay $1.8 million in restitution. On June 4, 2013, Cunningham completed his prison sentence. He was granted a conditional pardon by President Donald Trump in 2021.

== Early life and education ==
Cunningham was born in Los Angeles to Randall and Lela Cunningham on December 8, 1941, one day after the attack on Pearl Harbor. Around 1945, the family moved to Fresno, where Cunningham's father purchased a gas station. In 1953, they moved to rural Shelbina, Missouri, where his parents purchased and managed the five-and-dime Cunningham Variety Store.

Cunningham graduated from Shelbina High School in 1959. He attended Kirksville Teacher's College for one year, before transferring to the University of Missouri in Columbia. Cunningham graduated with a bachelor's degree in physical education in 1964; he obtained his MA in education the following year. He later earned an MBA from National University.

He was hired as a physical education teacher and swimming coach at Hinsdale Central High School, where he stayed for one year. Two members of his swim team competed in the 1968 Summer Olympics, where they earned a gold and a silver medal.

== Military service ==
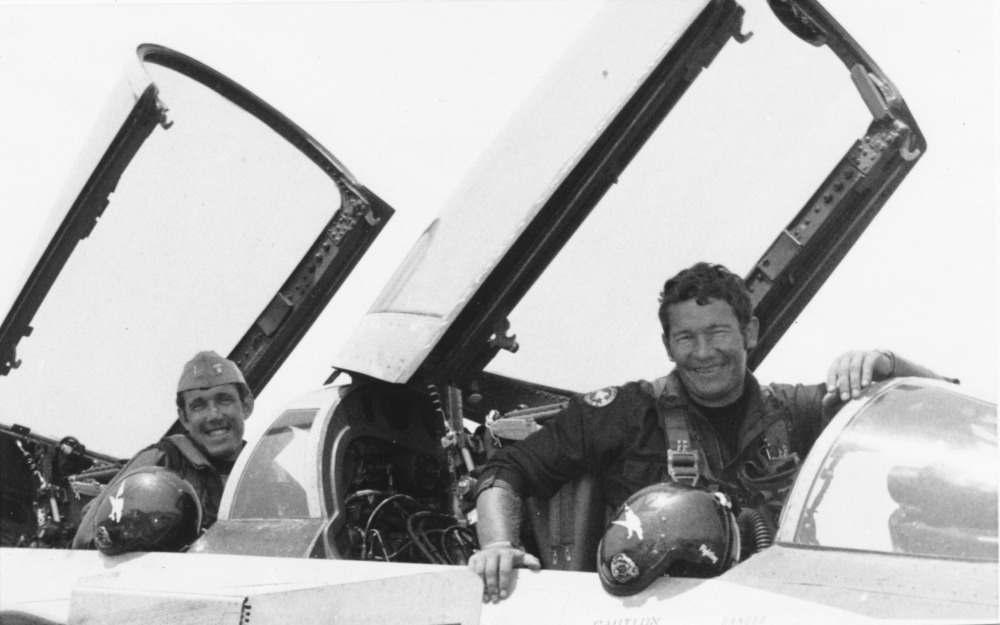
Cunningham and William P. Driscoll in the cockpit of a McDonnell F-4J Phantom II of Fighter Squadron 96 (VF-96), May 1972.

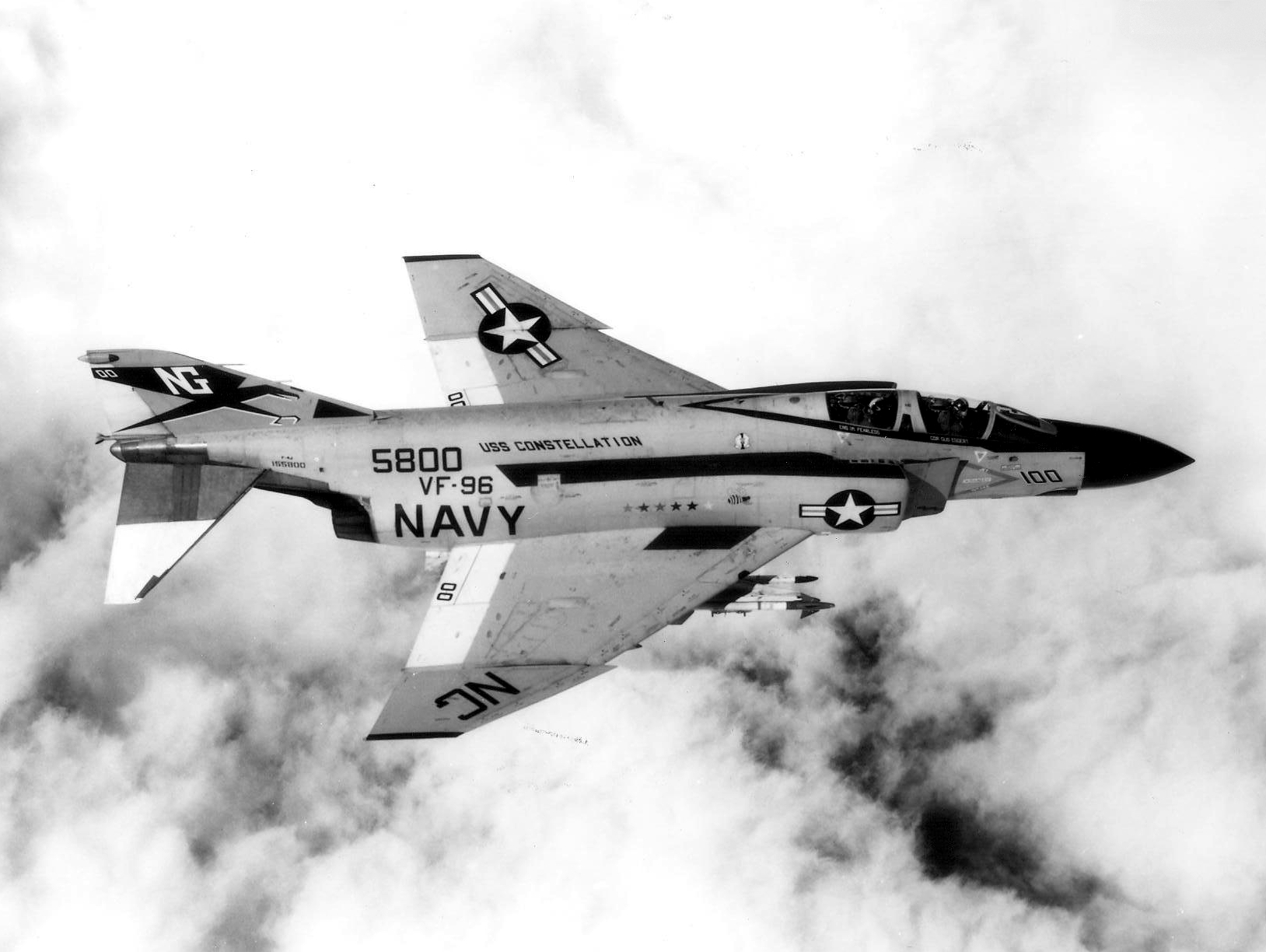
"Showtime 100", the F-4J flown for three "kills" by Cunningham and Driscoll

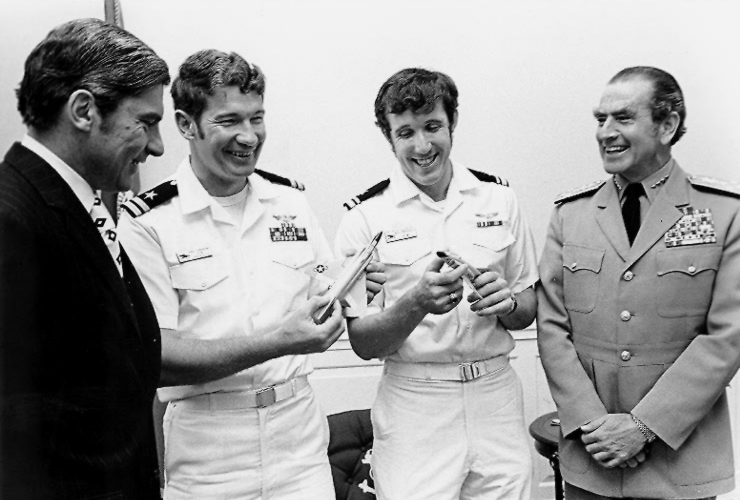
L-to-R: Secretary of the Navy John Warner, Cunningham, William P. Driscoll, Chief of Naval Operations Admiral Elmo Zumwalt June 1972 ceremony honoring Cunningham and Driscoll for their service in the Vietnam War.

Cunningham joined the United States Navy in 1967. During his service, Cunningham and his Navigator/Radar Intercept Officer (RIO) William P. Driscoll became the only Navy aces in the Vietnam War, flying an F-4 Phantom II from aboard aircraft carrier USS Constellation (CV-64). He and Driscoll recorded five aerial victories against North Vietnamese MiG-21 and MiG-17 aircraft between January and May 1972, including three kills in one flight (earning them the Navy Cross).

In the final engagement, Cunningham downed a MiG-17, which was supposedly piloted by "Colonel Tomb", a mythical North Vietnam Air Force fighter ace loosely based on a North Vietnamese pilot from the 921st Fighter Regiment named Nguyễn Văn Cốc. It was later revealed by historians there was no such Colonel Tomb and the story was fabricated by Cunningham himself. Văn Cốc retired from the Vietnamese People's Air Force in 2002.

While returning to the carrier after the final shoot-down, Cunningham and Driscoll were forced to eject from their F-4 over water near Nam Định after the aircraft was fatally damaged by a SA-2 surface-to-air missile, but they were rescued by Navy helicopter.

After returning to the U.S. from Vietnam in 1972, Cunningham became an instructor at the United States Navy Strike Fighter Tactics Instructor program (TOPGUN) at Naval Air Station Miramar in San Diego. He was reportedly nearly court-martialed for allegedly breaking into his commanding officer's office to compare his records and fitness reports with those of his colleagues—a charge denied by Cunningham but supported by two of his superior officers at the time. Cunningham served tours with VF-154, United States Seventh Fleet and as executive officer/commanding officer of the shore-based adversary squadron VF-126. In 1987, he was featured on the PBS broadcast of the NOVA special "Top Gun And Beyond", during which he recounted his engagement with the North Vietnamese fighter pilot thought to be the mythical "Colonel Toon".

Cunningham retired from the Navy with the final rank of commander in 1987, settling in Del Mar, a suburb of San Diego. He became nationally known as a CNN commentator on naval aircraft in the run-up to the Persian Gulf War.

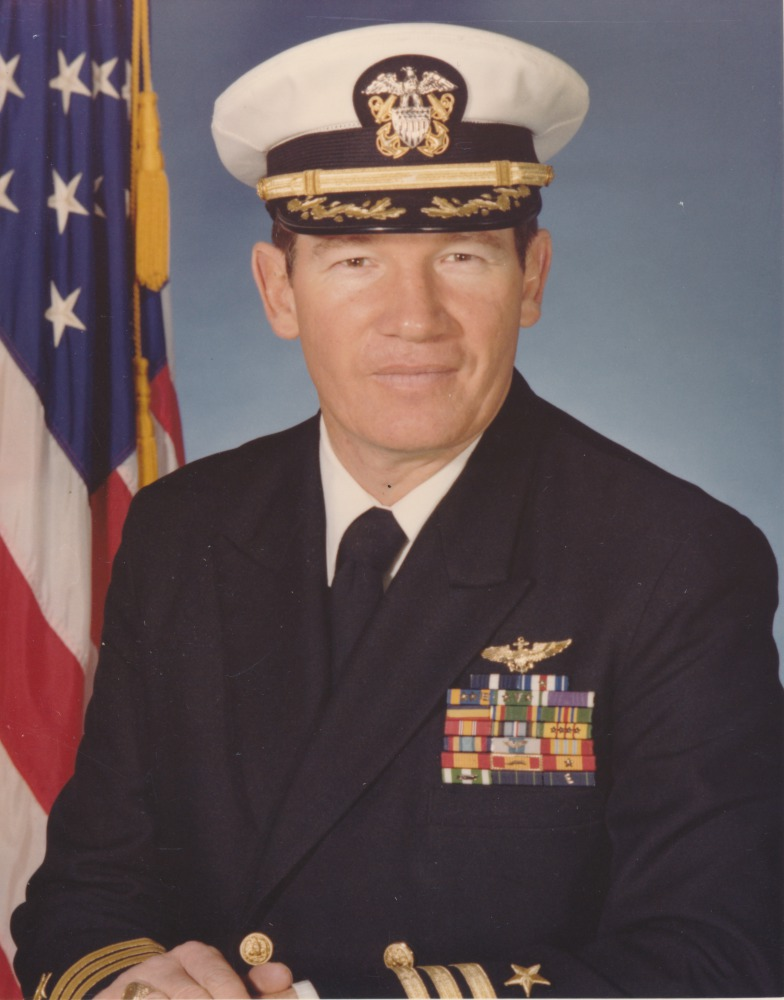

== Awards and decorations ==
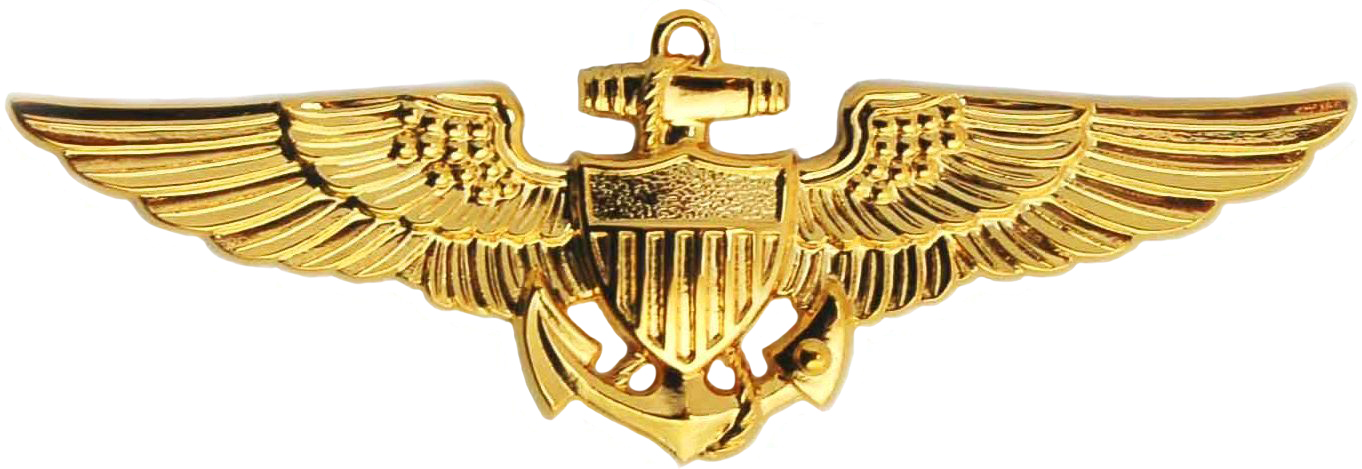

Naval Aviator insignia
Navy Cross		Silver Star with 1 gold award star
Air Medal with 3 silver award stars	Purple Heart	Navy and Marine Corps Commendation Medal with V Device and 2 gold award stars
Presidential Unit Citation	Navy Unit Commendation	Navy Meritorious Unit Commendation
National Defense Service Medal	Armed Forces Expeditionary Medal	Vietnam Service Medal with 4 service stars
Sea Service Ribbon	South Vietnamese Air Gallantry Cross with Silver Wing	South Vietnamese Armed Forces Honor Medal
Gallantry Cross Ribbon	Gallantry Cross Unit Citation Emblem with Palm and Frame	Gallantry Cross Ribbon with Bronze Star
Vietnam Campaign Medal	Navy Rifleman Marksmanship Ribbon	Navy Expert Pistol Shot Medal

== Political career ==
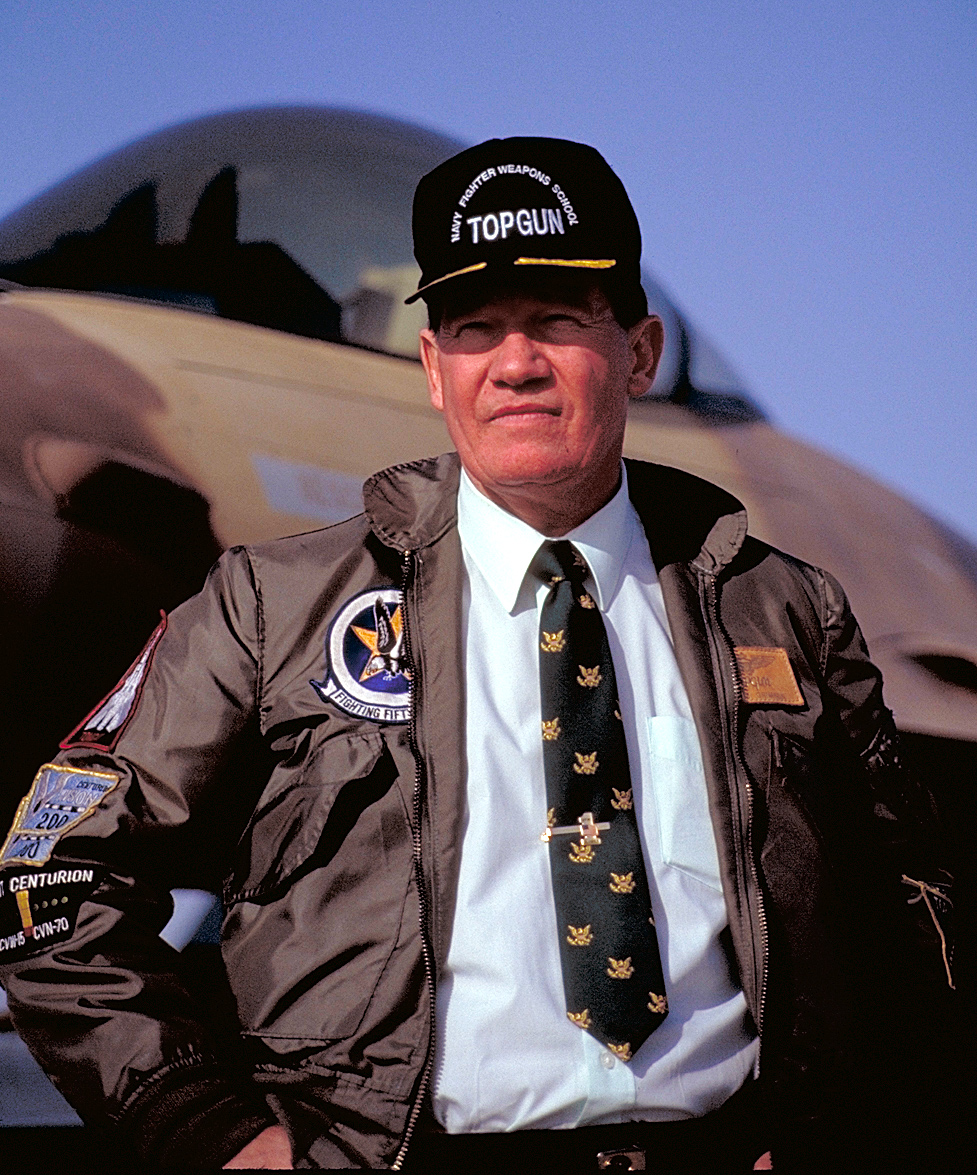
Congressman Cunningham at TOPGUN, 1991

Cunningham's visibility as a CNN commentator led several Republican leaders to approach him about running in what was then the 44th district, one of four congressional districts in San Diego. The district had been held for eight years by Democrat Jim Bates, and was considered the most Democratic district in the San Diego area. However, Bates was bogged down in a scandal involving charges of sexual harassment. Cunningham won the Republican nomination in 1990 and hammered Bates about the scandal, promising to be "a congressman we can be proud of." He won by just one percentage point, giving Republicans full representation of the San Diego area for only the second time since the city was split into two districts after the 1960 census.

Cunningham's status as a Vietnam war hero made him a sought-after source, by colleagues and the media, in the debate on whether to use military force against Iraq in the lead up to the first Gulf War. Guy Vander Jagt of Michigan, longtime chairman of the National Republican Congressional Committee, said that Cunningham had considerable "drawing power" and was treated as a celebrity by his fellow Republicans.

External videos
- BIOGRAPHY
- A brief biography of Duke Cunningham

After the 1990 census, redistricting renumbered the 44th district as the 51st and created the 50th district, splitting off a significant portion of San Diego County. At the same time, the 51st added several areas of heavily Republican North San Diego County. The new district included the home of Bill Lowery, a fellow Republican who had represented most of the other side of San Diego for the past 12 years. They faced one another in the Republican primary. Despite Lowery's seniority, his involvement in the House banking scandal hurt him. As polls showed Cunningham with a substantial lead, Lowery dropped out of the primary race, effectively handing Cunningham the nomination. Cunningham then breezed to victory in November.

Even though the district (renumbered as the 50th after the 2000 census) was not nearly as conservative as the other two Republican-held districts in the San Diego area, Cunningham was re-elected six times with no less than 55 percent of the vote.

Cunningham was a member of the Appropriations and Intelligence committees, and chaired the House Intelligence Subcommittee on Human Intelligence Analysis and Counterintelligence during the 109th Congress. He was considered a leading Republican expert on national security issues. He was also a champion of education, using his position on the Appropriations Education Subcommittee to steer federal dollars to schools in San Diego. After surgery for prostate cancer in 1998, he became a champion of early testing for the disease.

Cunningham was known for making controversial comments. For example:

- Making a comment about gay Congressman Barney Frank, where he called the rectal examination for prostate cancer "just not natural, unless maybe you're Barney Frank".
- Displaying his middle finger to a constituent and "for emphasis, [shouting] the two-word meaning of his one-finger salute" during an argument over military spending.
- Suggesting that the Democratic House leadership should be "lined up and shot"—a call he had previously made about Vietnam War protesters.
- Referring to gay soldiers as "homos" on the floor of the House of Representatives when he said backers of an environmental amendment were "the same people that would ... put homos in the military." He later apologized for his comments.

Cunningham said that "I cut my own rudder" on issues, He was often compared by liberal interest groups to former congressman Bob Dornan; both were former military pilots, and both spoke out against perceived enemies. In 1992, Cunningham, along with Dornan and fellow San Diego Republican Duncan L. Hunter, challenged the patriotism of then-Democratic presidential candidate Bill Clinton before a near-empty House chamber, but still viewed by C-SPAN viewers. In September 1996, Cunningham criticized President Clinton for appointing judges who were "soft on crime". "We must get tough on drug dealers," he said, adding that "those who peddle destruction on our children must pay dearly". He favored stiff drug penalties and voted for the death penalty for major drug dealers.

Four months later, his son Todd was arrested for helping to transport 400 pounds (180 kg) of marijuana from Texas to Indiana. Todd Cunningham pleaded guilty to possession and conspiracy to sell marijuana. At his son's sentencing hearing, Cunningham fought back tears as he begged the judge for leniency (Todd was sentenced to two and a half years in prison, in part because he tested positive for cocaine three times while on bail). After the sentencing, Cunningham was seen leaving the courthouse crying. Cunningham's press secretary responded to accusations of double standards with: "The sentence Todd got had nothing to do with who Duke is. Duke has always been tough on drugs and remains tough on drugs."

=== Legislative achievements ===
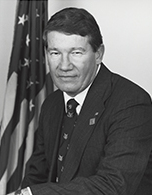
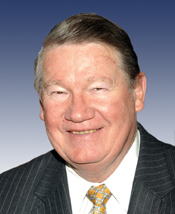
Undated portraits of Cunningham while in Congress

Cunningham was the lead sponsor of the Shark Finning Prohibition Act, which banned the practice of shark finning in all U.S. waters, and pushed the United States to the lead on efforts to ban shark finning worldwide. For his efforts, Cunningham was named as a "Conservation Hero" by the Audubon Society and the Ocean Wildlife Campaign. Cunningham also unsuccessfully advocated for the death penalty for all those convicted of shark finning.

Cunningham co-sponsored, along with Democrat John Murtha, the so-called "Flag Desecration Amendment", which would add the following sentence to the Constitution of the United States:

The Congress shall have power to prohibit the physical desecration of the Flag of the United States.

The proposed amendment has passed the House many times, but narrowly missed the requisite 2/3 majority vote for passage in the Senate. Cunningham also advocated for the death penalty for all those convicted of flag desecration.

Cunningham was the driving force behind the Law Enforcement Officers Safety Act which was passed and signed into law by President George W. Bush in July 2004. The law grants the authority to non-federal law enforcement officers from any jurisdiction to carry a firearm anywhere within the jurisdiction of the United States.

Cunningham supported reinstitution of the Selective Service draft.

== Tax evasion, bribery, mail fraud and wire fraud ==
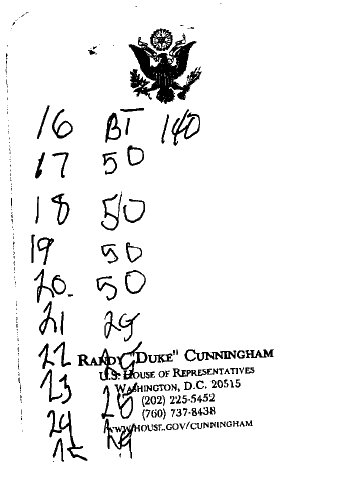
Scan of a document submitted as evidence by the prosecution and included in their February 2006 sentencing memorandum against Cunningham, penned by his own hand on his own Congressional office stationery for the benefit of "co-conspirator#2" (defense contractor Mitchell Wade). The left column lists millions of dollars of government contracts; the right column lists the thousands of dollars in bribes required to secure them. The figures in the right column are increases; e.g. $50,000 in bribes would mean the difference between $18 million and $19 million of awarded contracts. "BT" is an abbreviation for "Buoy Toy" – a 42-foot Carver yacht that was financed by Wade in exchange for $16 million in contracts. Cunningham renamed it the "Duke-stir".

=== Allegations ===
In June 2005, a story appeared in The San Diego Union-Tribune by Marcus Stern and Jerry Kammer who later received a Pulitzer Prize for their reporting. The story revealed that a defense contractor, Mitchell Wade, founder of the defense contracting firm MZM Inc. (since renamed Athena Innovative Solutions Inc. and later acquired by CACI), bought Cunningham's house in Del Mar in 2003 for $1,675,000. A month later, Wade placed it back on the market where it remained unsold for eight months until the price was reduced to $975,000. Cunningham was a member of the Defense Appropriations Subcommittee at the time. Soon after the purchase, Wade's company began to receive tens of millions of dollars' worth of defense and intelligence contracts. Cunningham claimed the deal was legitimate, adding, "I feel very confident that I haven't done anything wrong."

Later in June, it was further reported that Cunningham lived rent-free on a yacht named the "Duke Stir" while he was in Washington. The yacht was owned by Wade; Cunningham paid only for maintenance. An article in The San Diego Union-Tribune reported that Cunningham liked to invite women to his yacht. Two of them said that he would change into pajama bottoms and a turtleneck sweater to entertain them with chilled champagne by the light of a lava lamp.

The Federal Bureau of Investigation launched an investigation regarding the real estate transaction. Cunningham's home, MZM corporate offices, and Wade's home were all simultaneously raided by several federal agencies with warrants on July 1, 2005.

On July 14, 2005, Cunningham announced he would not run for a ninth term in 2006, saying that while he believed he would be cleared of any wrongdoing, he could not defend himself and run for re-election at the same time. He admitted to displaying "poor judgment" when he sold his house to Wade.

Besides Wade, the three other co-conspirators were: Brent R. Wilkes, founder of San Diego–based ADCS Inc.; New York businessman Thomas Kontogiannis; and John T. Michael, Kontogiannis' nephew and the owner of a New York–based mortgage company, Coastal Capital Corp. Property records show the company made $1.15 million in real estate loans to Cunningham, two of which were used in the purchase of his Rancho Santa Fe mansion. Court records show that Wade paid off one of those loans.

In 1997, Cunningham had pushed the Pentagon into buying a $20 million document-digitization system created by ADCS Inc., one of several defense companies owned by Wilkes. The Pentagon did not want to buy the system. When it had not done so three years later, Cunningham angrily demanded the firing of Lou Kratz, an assistant undersecretary of defense Cunningham held responsible for the delays. It later emerged that Wilkes reportedly gave Cunningham more than $630,000 in cash and favors.

Cunningham was also criticized for selling merchandise on his personal website, such as a $595 Buck knife featuring the official Congressional seal. He failed to obtain permission to use the seal, which is a federal offense.

On April 27, 2006, months after his guilty plea, The Wall Street Journal reported that, in addition to all the favors, gifts, and money Cunningham received from defense contractors who wanted his help in obtaining contracts, he may have been provided with prostitutes, narcotics, hotel rooms, limousines, and other amenities.

=== Plea agreement ===
Duke Cunningham
- Occupation: Politician
- Status: Released (2013); Conditionally pardoned (2021)
- Criminal charges: Tax evasion, mail fraud, wire fraud, conspiracy to commit bribery
- Penalty: 100 months imprisonment

On November 28, 2005, Cunningham pleaded guilty to tax evasion, conspiracy to commit bribery, mail fraud, and wire fraud in federal court in San Diego. The investigation which led to the conviction of Cunningham was led by a team of Marcus Stern, Jerry Kammer, and Dean Calbreath. Among the many bribes Cunningham admitted receiving was the sale of his home in Del Mar at an inflated price, the free use of the yacht "Duke Stir," a used Rolls-Royce, antique furniture, Persian rugs, jewelry, and a $2,000 contribution for his daughter's college graduation party. Cunningham's attorney, Mark Holscher, later said that the government's evidence was so overwhelming that he had no choice but to recommend a guilty plea. With the plea bargain, Cunningham faced a maximum of 10 years; had he fought the charges, Cunningham risked spending the rest of his life in prison.

As part of his guilty plea, Cunningham agreed to forfeit his $2.55 million home in Rancho Santa Fe, which he bought with the proceeds of the sale of the Del Mar house. Cunningham initially tried to sell the Rancho Santa Fe house, but federal prosecutors moved to block the sale after finding evidence it was purchased with Wade's money. Wade—assisted by others—paid off the balance Cunningham owed on the mortgage. Cunningham also forfeited more than $1.8 million in cash, antiques, rugs, and other items. Also as part of the plea agreement, Cunningham agreed to help the government in its prosecution of others involved in the defense contractor bribery scandal.

=== Resignation ===
Cunningham announced that he would resign from the House at a press conference just after entering his plea. He read a prepared statement announcing that he was stepping down:

When I announced several months ago that I would not seek re-election, I publicly declared my innocence because I was not strong enough to face the truth. So, I misled my family, staff, friends, colleagues, the public—even myself. For all of this, I am deeply sorry. The truth is—I broke the law, concealed my conduct, and disgraced my high office. I know that I will forfeit my freedom, my reputation, my worldly possessions, and most importantly, the trust of my friends and family... In my life, I have known great joy and great sorrow. And now I know great shame. I learned in Vietnam that the true measure of a man is how he responds to adversity. I cannot undo what I have done. But I can atone. I am now almost 65 years old and, as I enter the twilight of my life, I intend to use the remaining time that God grants me to make amends.

Cunningham submitted his official resignation letter to the Clerk of the House and to Governor Arnold Schwarzenegger on December 6, 2005.

=== Sentencing and prison ===
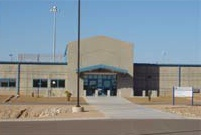
United States Penitentiary, Tucson, where Cunningham was located

On March 3, 2006, U.S. District Court Judge Larry A. Burns sentenced Cunningham to eight years and four months in prison. Federal prosecutors pushed for the maximum sentence of ten years, but Cunningham's defense lawyers argued that at 64 years old and with prostate cancer, Cunningham would likely die in prison if he received the full sentence. Burns cited his military service in Vietnam, age, and health as the reason the full ten years was not imposed. Prosecutors announced that they were satisfied with the sentence, which was the longest jail term ever given to a former Congressman.

On the day of sentencing, Cunningham was 90 lb (41 kg) lighter than when allegations first surfaced 9 months earlier. After receiving his sentence, Cunningham made a request to see his 91-year-old mother one last time before going to prison. "I made a very wrong turn. I rationalized decisions I knew were wrong. I did that, sir," Cunningham said. The request was denied, and Burns remanded him immediately upon rendering the sentence. Cunningham was incarcerated in the minimum security satellite camp at the U.S. Penitentiary at Tucson, Arizona, with a scheduled release date of June 4, 2013. He spent his time at the prison teaching fellow inmates to obtain their GED, as well as advocating for prison reform.

Despite his guilty plea, Cunningham received pensions for his 21 years of U.S. Navy service and almost 15 years in Congress. However, prosecutors were successful in garnishing them for back taxes and penalties. In June 2010, Cunningham submitted a handwritten three-page letter to Burns, complaining that the IRS was "killing" him by seizing all his remaining savings and his Congressional and Navy pensions, penalties he felt were not warranted under his plea agreement. Burns wrote back in August 2010, stating that the agency was collecting back taxes, interest, and penalties on the bribes Cunningham received in 2003 and 2004; thus, there was no action for Burns to take.

In April 2011, Cunningham sent a ten-page typewritten document pleading his case to USA Today, the Los Angeles Times, Talking Points Memo, and San Diego CityBeat. He titled the document "The Untold Story of Duke Cunningham". In the document, Cunningham wrote that because Burns had declared his case closed, he was now offering to speak to the media, which had "inundated" him with inquiries since 2004. According to CityBeat, in the statement, Cunningham claimed that he was "doped up on sedatives" and made his plea knowing that it was "90 to 95% untrue".

=== Release from prison ===
Cunningham's conditional pardon

Cunningham was released to a halfway house in New Orleans in February 2013. On June 4, 2013, he was completely released from confinement.

Cunningham told a federal judge that he planned to live in Arkansas and that he would live on $1,700 a month. In his letter, Cunningham pleaded for a gun permit, saying he longed to hunt in Arkansas. The judge denied the request as being beyond the scope of his authority, citing the law that limits gun permits for convicted criminals: a law that Cunningham voted for while in Congress. Cunningham received a pardon from President Donald Trump on January 13, 2021, conditioned on his payment of penalties of restitution and forfeiture totaling $3,655,539.50.

=== Reactions to the scandal ===
Darrell Issa, a Republican who represented the neighboring 49th district, said after Cunningham's plea that he had been waiting for Cunningham to explain his behavior "in a way that made sense to us" and that Cunningham's behavior "fell below the standard the public demands of its elected representatives".

Francine Busby, Cunningham's Democratic challenger in 2004 and the Democratic candidate for the 50th district in the runoff election to fill Cunningham's vacancy, called November 28 "a sad day for the people" and called for support for her proposed ethics reform bill, the "Clean House Act", saying that "our government in Washington is broken."

In an editorial on November 29, The Washington Post called the Cunningham affair "the most brazen bribery conspiracy in modern congressional history". Later that day, President George W. Bush called Cunningham's actions "outrageous" at a press briefing in El Paso, Texas. He also said that Cunningham should "pay a serious price" for his crimes. House Speaker Dennis Hastert said in a December 6 statement that Cunningham was a "war hero"; but that he broke "the public trust he has built through his military and congressional career".

On February 9, 2006, Senator John Kerry introduced a bill, the "Federal Pension Forfeiture Act" (nicknamed the "Duke Cunningham Act"), to prevent lawmakers who have been convicted of official misconduct from collecting taxpayer-funded pensions. The bill died in committee, by unanimous vote.

=== Aftermath ===
- Almost as soon as Cunningham pleaded guilty, Intelligence Committee chairman Pete Hoekstra of Michigan announced his panel would investigate whether Cunningham used his post on that committee to steer contracts to favored companies. Hoekstra said that Cunningham "no longer gets the benefit of the doubt" due to his admission to "very, very serious" crimes.
- On January 6, 2006, Time reported that Cunningham cooperated with law enforcement by wearing a concealed recording device (a "wire") while meeting with associates prior to his guilty plea. It is not known whom he met with while wired, but there was speculation Cunningham's misdeeds were not isolated instances and his case would reveal a larger web of corruption.
- In February 2006, Mitchell Wade pleaded guilty to paying Cunningham more than $1 million in bribes in exchange for millions more in government contracts.
- In March 2006, it was revealed that CIA officials opened an investigation into the CIA's No. 3 official, Kyle Foggo, and his relationship with Wilkes, "one of his closest friends", according to the article. Foggo said that all of the contracts he oversaw were properly awarded and administered. On May 12, FBI officials raided the Vienna, Virginia, home of Foggo in connection with the scandal. In February 2007, Foggo was charged with fraud and other offenses in the Cunningham corruption investigation. The indictment also named Wilkes and John T. Michael.
- In November 2010, Wilkes' lawyers filed documents in court in a bid to gain a re-trial that included statements from Cunningham saying "Wilkes never bribed me." Cunningham is quoted as saying any meals, trips or gifts from Wilkes to him were merely gifts between long-time friends, not bribes. Cunningham also stated that he had been coached by prosecutors to avoid responding to questions where his version of the facts differed from the prosecutors' theory. Cunningham also denied having made statements attributed to him by federal agents and prosecutors. Notably he denied having sex with any prostitute on a trip to Hawaii and explained that at the time he was impotent due to treatment for prostate cancer.
- A special election to fill the vacancy left by Cunningham took place on April 11, 2006, between Democrat Francine Busby and Republican Brian Bilbray. No candidate obtained the majority necessary to win outright, so a runoff election was held. Bilbray won the runoff, narrowly defeating Busby. Bilbray beat Busby again in the regular election in November and retained his seat in the House until losing to Democrat Scott Peters in 2012.
- On April 17, the staffs of The San Diego Union-Tribune and Copley News Service were awarded the 2006 Pulitzer Prize for National Reporting for their investigative work in uncovering Cunningham's crimes.
- Four reporters from the Union-Tribune and its parent Copley News Service, who had written the stories that launched the Cunningham investigation, published a book called The Wrong Stuff: The extraordinary saga of Randy "Duke" Cunningham, the most corrupt congressman ever caught.

== Personal life and death ==
Cunningham married Susan Albrecht in 1965; they had met in college. They adopted a son together. His wife filed for divorce and a restraining order in January 1973, based on her claims of emotional abuse, and the divorce was granted eight months later. Cunningham later said that his life hit "rock-bottom" in that year.

In 1973, he met Dan McKinnon, a publisher and son of former Congressman Clinton D. McKinnon, who encouraged him to turn his life around. Cunningham married his second wife, Nancy Jones, in 1974. They had two daughters and separated in July 2005. He then married again, to Sharon Stone, in 2021.

Cunningham, latterly a resident of Hensley, Arkansas, died on August 27, 2025, in Little Rock, Arkansas, at the age of 83. Cunningham was buried in Miramar National Cemetery in San Diego, California on October 9, 2025.

== See also ==
- List of American federal politicians convicted of crimes
- List of federal political scandals in the United States

U.S. House of Representatives
Preceded by Jim Bates	Member of the U.S. House of Representatives from California's 44th congressional district 1991–1993	Succeeded by Alfred A. McCandless
New constituency	Member of the U.S. House of Representatives from California's 51st congressional district 1993–2003	Succeeded by Bob Filner
Preceded by Bob Filner	Member of the U.S. House of Representatives from California's 50th congressional district 2003–2005	Succeeded by Brian Bilbray
