= 2006 United States House of Representatives elections =

House elections for the 110th U.S. Congress

- November 7, 2006

All 435 seats in the United States House of Representatives (Note: In addition, four of the five non-voting delegates in the U.S. House of Representatives were elected.) 218 seats needed for a majority
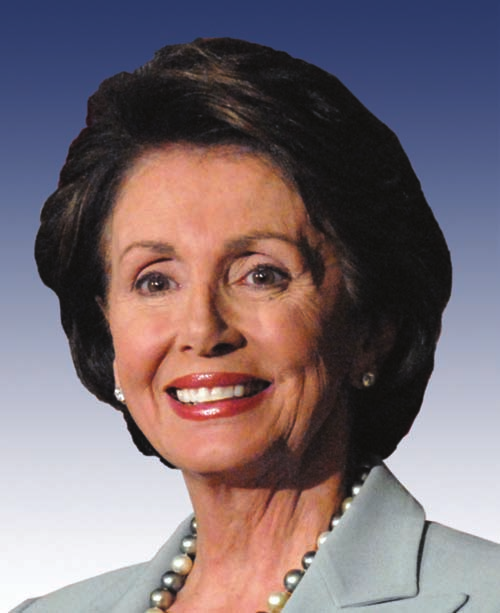

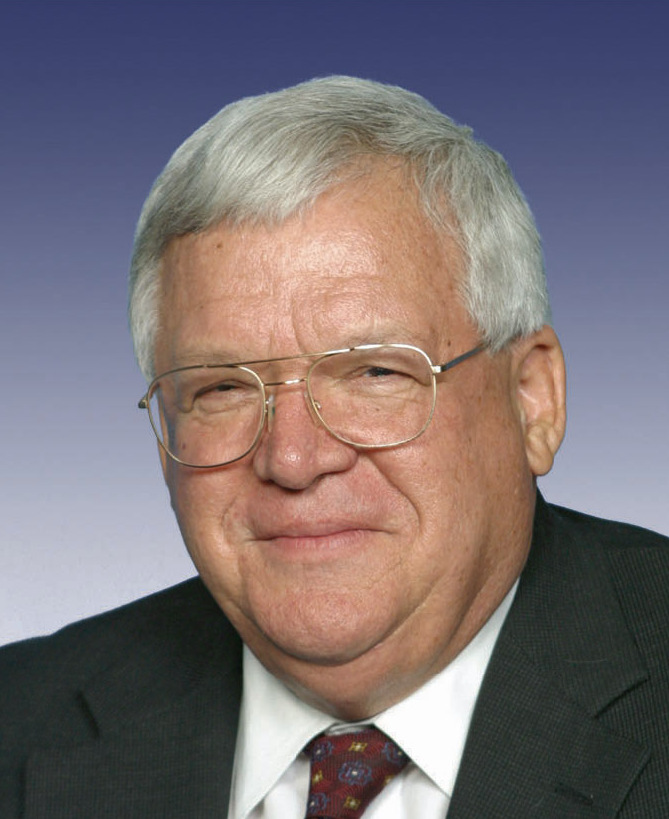
| | Majority party | Minority party |
|---|---|---|
| Leader | Nancy Pelosi | Dennis Hastert |
| Party | Democratic | Republican |
| Leader since | January 3, 2003 | January 3, 1999 |
| Leader's seat | California 8th | Illinois 14th |
| Last election | 202 seats, 46.8% | 232 seats, 49.4% |
| Seats before | 201 | 229 |
| Seats won | 233 | 202 |
| Seat change | ▲31 | ▼30 |
| Popular vote | 42,338,795 | 35,857,334 |
| Percentage | 52.3% | 44.3% |
| Swing | ▲5.5pp | ▼5.1pp |
| | Third party |
| Party | Independent |
| Last election | 1 |
| Seats won | 0 |
| Seat change | ▼1 |
| Popular vote | 417,895 |
| Percentage | 0.5% |
| Swing | ▼0.1pp |
- Results: Democratic hold Democratic gain Republican hold
Speaker before election
Dennis Hastert
Republican
Elected Speaker
Nancy Pelosi
Democratic

The 2006 United States House of Representatives elections were held on November 7, 2006, to elect members to the United States House of Representatives. It took place in the middle of President George W. Bush's second term in office. All 435 seats of the House were up for election. Those elected served in the 110th United States Congress from January 3, 2007, until January 3, 2009. The incumbent majority party, the Republicans, had won majorities in the House consecutively since 1994, and were defeated by the Democrats who won a majority in the chamber, ending 12 years of Republican control in the House.

The Republicans had won a 232-seat majority in 2004, but by the time of the 2006 election, they held 229 seats, while the Democrats held 201, plus 1 Independent (Bernie Sanders) who caucused with the Democrats. There were also four vacancies. Democrats needed to pick up 15 seats to take control of the House, which had been in Republican control since January 1995. Along with the historical "sixth-year itch" that has plagued many incumbent presidents in midterm elections, the public's perception of George W. Bush, the handling of the Iraq War and the War in Afghanistan, and a series of political scandals involving mostly congressional Republicans took their toll on the party at the ballot box.

The final result was a 31-seat pickup for the Democrats, including the pickup of the Vermont at-large seat, previously held by Independent Bernie Sanders (who ran instead for U.S. Senate), who caucused with the Democrats. Democrats defeated 22 Republican incumbents and won eight open Republican-held seats. For the first time since the party's founding, Republicans won no seats previously held by Democrats and defeated no Democratic incumbents. It was the largest seat gain for the Democrats since the 1974 elections. Among the new Democrats were the first Muslim in Congress (Keith Ellison) and the first two Buddhists (Mazie Hirono and Hank Johnson). As a result of the Democratic victory, Nancy Pelosi became the first female and the first Californian House Speaker.

As of 2026, this is the only House election cycle where only one party flipped any seats, the last time Republicans won a House race in Connecticut or more than one House seat in New Mexico, and the last time Democrats won more than one House seat in Kansas.

Several members of the House first elected in 2006 have gone on to receive national attention, including Gabby Giffords, Jim Jordan, and Michele Bachmann; United States senators Kirsten Gillibrand, Dean Heller, Mazie Hirono, and Chris Murphy; senator and ambassador Joe Donnelly; former speaker Kevin McCarthy; Minnesota Attorney General Keith Ellison; and governor and vice-presidential candidate Tim Walz.

== Results ==
=== Federal ===
↓
| 233 | 202 |
| Democratic | Republican |

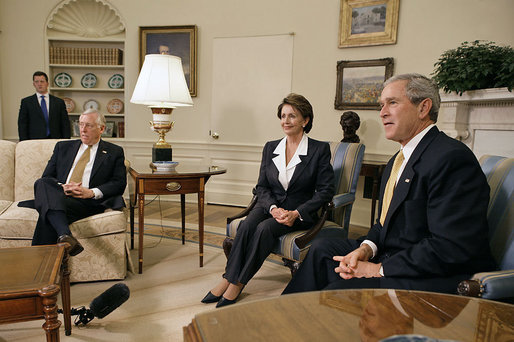
President Bush met with Nancy Pelosi and Steny Hoyer (then House Minority Leader and Minority Whip, respectively) at the Oval Office in the White House. The President congratulated Pelosi and Hoyer on their newfound majority and vowed to work with them until his presidency was over. Regarding Pelosi's elevation to Speaker of the House, Bush commented, "This is a historic moment".

Summary of the November 7, 2006, United States House of Representatives election results
| Party | Seats | | | | Popular vote | | |
| Party | 2004 | 2006 | Net change | % | Vote | % | +/− |
|---|---|---|---|---|---|---|---|
| Democratic Party | 202 | 233 | ▲31 | 53.6% | 42,338,795 | 52.3% | +5.5% |
| Republican Party | 232 | 202 | ▼30 | 46.4% | 35,857,334 | 44.3% | −5.1% |
| Libertarian Party | − | − | − | − | 656,764 | 0.8% | −0.1% |
| Independent | 1 | 0 | ▼1 | - | 417,895 | 0.5% | −0.1% |
| Green Party | − | − | − | − | 243,391 | 0.3% | - |
| Constitution Party | − | − | − | − | 91,133 | 0.1% | −0.1% |
| Independence Party | − | − | − | − | 85,815 | 0.1% | - |
| Reform Party | − | − | − | − | 53,862 | 0.1% | − |
| Other parties | − | − | − | − | 1,230,548 | 1.5% | −0.1% |
| Totals | 435 | 435 | − | 100.0% | 80,975,537 | 100.0% | − |
Voter turnout: 36.8%
Sources: Election Statistics - Office of the Clerk

Popular vote
| Democratic | 52.29% |
| Republican | 44.28% |
| Libertarian | 0.81% |
| Green | 0.29% |
| Others | 2.33% |

House seats
| Democratic | 53.56% |
| Republican | 46.44% |

=== Voter demographics ===
Vote by demographic subgroup
| Demographic subgroup | DEM | GOP | Other | % of total vote |
|---|---|---|---|---|
| Total vote | 52 | 44 | 4 | 100 |
Ideology
| Liberals | 87 | 11 | 2 | 20 |
| Moderates | 60 | 38 | 2 | 47 |
| Conservatives | 20 | 78 | 2 | 32 |
Party
| Democrats | 93 | 7 | n/a | 38 |
| Republicans | 8 | 91 | 1 | 36 |
| Independents | 57 | 39 | 4 | 26 |
Gender
| Men | 50 | 47 | 3 | 49 |
| Women | 55 | 43 | 2 | 51 |
Marital status
| Married | 48 | 51 | 1 | 68 |
| Unmarried | 64 | 34 | 2 | 32 |
Gender by marital status
| Married men | 47 | 51 | 2 | 35 |
| Married women | 48 | 50 | 2 | 33 |
| Unmarried men | 62 | 36 | 2 | 14 |
| Unmarried women | 66 | 32 | 2 | 18 |
Race/ethnicity
| White | 47 | 51 | 2 | 79 |
| Black | 89 | 10 | 1 | 10 |
| Asian | 62 | 37 | 1 | 2 |
| Other | 55 | 42 | 3 | 2 |
| Hispanic (of any race) | 69 | 30 | 1 | 8 |
Gender by race
| White men | 44 | 53 | 3 | 39 |
| White women | 49 | 50 | 1 | 40 |
| Non-white men | 75 | 23 | 2 | 9 |
| Non-white women | 78 | 21 | 1 | 11 |
Religion
| Protestant | 44 | 54 | 2 | 55 |
| Catholic | 55 | 44 | 1 | 26 |
| Jewish | 87 | 12 | 1 | 2 |
| Other religion | 71 | 25 | 4 | 6 |
| None | 74 | 22 | 4 | 11 |
Religious service attendance
| More than weekly | 38 | 60 | 2 | 17 |
| Weekly | 46 | 53 | 1 | 28 |
| Monthly | 57 | 41 | 2 | 12 |
| A few times a year | 60 | 38 | 2 | 25 |
| Never | 67 | 30 | 3 | 15 |
White evangelical or born-again Christian
| White evangelical or born-again Christian | 28 | 70 | 2 | 24 |
| Everyone else | 59 | 39 | 2 | 76 |
Age
| 18–29 years old | 60 | 38 | 2 | 12 |
| 30–44 years old | 53 | 45 | 2 | 24 |
| 45–59 years old | 53 | 46 | 1 | 34 |
| 60 and older | 50 | 48 | 2 | 29 |
Sexual orientation
| LGBT | 75 | 24 | 1 | 3 |
| Heterosexual | 52 | 46 | 2 | 97 |
Education
| Not a high school graduate | 64 | 35 | 1 | 3 |
| High school graduate | 55 | 44 | 1 | 21 |
| Some college education | 51 | 47 | 2 | 31 |
| College graduate | 49 | 49 | 2 | 27 |
| Postgraduate education | 58 | 41 | 1 | 18 |
Family income
| Under $15,000 | 67 | 30 | 3 | 7 |
| $15,000–30,000 | 61 | 36 | 3 | 12 |
| $30,000–50,000 | 56 | 43 | 1 | 21 |
| $50,000–75,000 | 50 | 48 | 2 | 22 |
| $75,000–100,000 | 52 | 47 | 1 | 16 |
| $100,000–150,000 | 47 | 51 | 2 | 13 |
| $150,000–200,000 | 47 | 51 | 2 | 5 |
| Over $200,000 | 45 | 53 | 2 | 5 |
Union households
| Union | 64 | 34 | 2 | 23 |
| Non-union | 49 | 49 | 2 | 77 |
Region
| Northeast | 63 | 35 | 2 | 22 |
| Midwest | 52 | 47 | 1 | 27 |
| South | 45 | 53 | 2 | 30 |
| West | 54 | 43 | 3 | 21 |
Community size
| Urban | 61 | 37 | 2 | 30 |
| Suburban | 50 | 48 | 2 | 47 |
| Rural | 48 | 50 | 2 | 24 |

Source: CNN exit poll

=== Maps ===
House seats by party holding majority in state

Results shaded by winners' share of vote

Popular vote by states

Summary of party changes
3–5 Democratic seat pickup
1–2 Democratic seat pickup

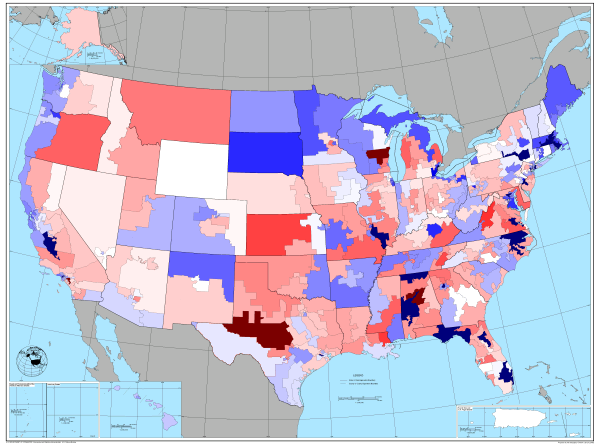
Winning margins in all House races

== Retiring incumbents ==
27 incumbents did not seek re-election. The four vacancies were New Jersey's 13th congressional district, to be filled at the same time as the general election with the winner taking office in November immediately after the votes were certified; Texas's 22nd congressional district, with a separate special election on the same day; and Ohio's 18th congressional district and Florida's 16th congressional district, which did not have special elections to fill the vacancies before January 2007. New Jersey's 13th congressional district had been held by Democrat Bob Menendez, Texas's 22nd congressional district had been held by Republican Tom DeLay, Ohio's 18th congressional district had been held by Republican Robert Ney, and Florida's 16th congressional district had been held by Republican Mark Foley. Democrats won all four races.

Retiring incumbents by district Democratic incumbent ran Democratic incumbent retired or lost renomination Republican incumbent ran Republican incumbent retired or lost renomination Independent incumbent retired Vacant district

=== Democratic incumbents ===
Nine Democrats retired, all of whom were replaced by Democrats.

1. Florida's 11th congressional district: Jim Davis retired to run for governor of Florida.
2. Hawaii's 2nd congressional district: Ed Case retired to run for the U.S. Senate.
3. Illinois's 17th congressional district: Lane Evans retired.
4. Maryland's 3rd congressional district: Ben Cardin retired to run for the U.S. Senate.
5. Minnesota's 5th congressional district: Martin Olav Sabo retired.
6. New York's 11th congressional district: Major Owens retired.
7. Ohio's 6th congressional district: Ted Strickland retired to run for governor of Ohio.
8. Ohio's 13th congressional district: Sherrod Brown retired to run for the U.S. Senate.
9. Tennessee's 9th congressional district: Harold Ford Jr. retired to run for the U.S. Senate.

=== Republican incumbents ===
Seventeen Republicans retired, twelve of whom were replaced by Republicans and five replaced by Democrats.

1. Arizona's 8th congressional district: Jim Kolbe retired.
2. California's 22nd congressional district: Bill Thomas retired.
3. Colorado's 5th congressional district: Joel Hefley retired.
4. Colorado's 7th congressional district: Bob Beauprez retired to run for governor of Colorado.
5. Florida's 9th congressional district: Michael Bilirakis retired.
6. Florida's 13th congressional district: Katherine Harris retired to run for the U.S. Senate.
7. Idaho's 1st congressional district: Butch Otter retired to run for governor of Idaho.
8. Illinois's 6th congressional district: Henry Hyde retired.
9. Iowa's 1st congressional district: Jim Nussle retired to run for governor of Iowa.
10. Minnesota's 6th congressional district: Mark Kennedy retired to run for the U.S. Senate.
11. Nebraska's 3rd congressional district: Tom Osborne retired to run for governor of Nebraska.
12. Nevada's 2nd congressional district: Jim Gibbons retired to run for governor of Nevada.
13. New York's 24th congressional district: Sherwood Boehlert retired.
14. Ohio's 4th congressional district: Mike Oxley retired.
15. Oklahoma's 5th congressional district: Ernest Istook retired to run for governor of Oklahoma.
16. Tennessee's 1st congressional district: Bill Jenkins retired.
17. Wisconsin's 8th congressional district: Mark Green retired to run for governor of Wisconsin.

=== Independent incumbent ===
One independent who caucused with the Democrats retired, and was replaced by a Democrat.

1. Vermont's at-large: Bernie Sanders retired to run for the U.S. Senate.

== Incumbents defeated ==
=== Defeated in primary elections ===
Two incumbents were defeated in their party's respective primaries, which their respective parties held in the general election.

1. ▌Georgia's 4th congressional district: Cynthia McKinney (D)
2. ▌Michigan's 7th congressional district: Joe Schwarz (R)

=== Defeated in general election ===
22 Republican incumbents were defeated by Democrats.

1. Arizona's 5th congressional district: J. D. Hayworth
2. California's 11th congressional district: Richard Pombo
3. Connecticut's 2nd congressional district: Rob Simmons
4. Connecticut's 5th congressional district: Nancy Johnson
5. Florida's 22nd congressional district: Clay Shaw
6. Indiana's 2nd congressional district: Chris Chocola
7. Indiana's 8th congressional district: John Hostettler
8. Indiana's 9th congressional district: Mike Sodrel
9. Iowa's 2nd congressional district: Jim Leach
10. Kansas's 2nd congressional district: Jim Ryun
11. Kentucky's 3rd congressional district: Anne Northup
12. Minnesota's 1st congressional district: Gil Gutknecht
13. New Hampshire's 1st congressional district: Jeb Bradley
14. New Hampshire's 2nd congressional district: Charles Bass
15. New York's 19th congressional district: Sue Kelly
16. New York's 20th congressional district: John E. Sweeney
17. North Carolina's 11th congressional district: Charles Taylor
18. Pennsylvania's 4th congressional district: Melissa Hart
19. Pennsylvania's 7th congressional district: Curt Weldon
20. Pennsylvania's 8th congressional district: Mike Fitzpatrick
21. Pennsylvania's 10th congressional district: Don Sherwood
22. Texas's 23rd congressional district: Henry Bonilla

== Open seats that changed parties ==
Five Republicans who retired were replaced by Democrats.

1. Arizona's 8th congressional district: Jim Kolbe was replaced by Gabby Giffords.
2. Colorado's 7th congressional district: Bob Beauprez was replaced by Ed Perlmutter.
3. Iowa's 1st congressional district: Jim Nussle was replaced by Bruce Braley.
4. New York's 24th congressional district: Sherwood Boehlert was replaced by Mike Arcuri.
5. Wisconsin's 8th congressional district: Mark Green was replaced by Steve Kagan.

One independent who caucused with the Democrats retired, and was replaced by a Democrat.

1. Vermont's at-large: Bernie Sanders was replaced by Peter Welch.

== Closest races ==
Sixty races were decided by 10% or lower.

| District | Winner | Margin |
|---|---|---|
| Connecticut 2nd | Democratic (flip) | 0.04% |
| Florida 13th | Republican | 0.16% |
| North Carolina 8th | Republican | 0.28% |
| New Mexico 1st | Republican | 0.40% |
| Ohio 15th | Republican | 0.48% |
| Wyoming at-large | Republican | 0.53% |
| Pennsylvania 8th | Democratic (flip) | 0.60% |
| Georgia 12th | Democratic | 0.61% |
| Ohio 2nd | Republican | 1.06% |
| Georgia 8th | Democratic | 1.09% |
| Pennsylvania 6th | Republican | 1.32% |
| New Jersey 7th | Republican | 1.48% |
| New York 25th | Republican | 1.57% |
| Florida 16th | Democratic (flip) | 1.89% |
| Nevada 3rd | Republican | 1.89% |
| Wisconsin 8th | Democratic (flip) | 2.14% |
| New York 19th | Democratic (flip) | 2.43% |
| Kentucky 3rd | Democratic (flip) | 2.44% |
| Colorado 4th | Republican | 2.49% |
| New Hampshire 1st | Democratic (flip) | 2.63% |
| Illinois 6th | Republican | 2.70% |
| Virginia 2nd | Republican | 2.82% |
| Iowa 2nd | Democratic (flip) | 2.86% |
| New York 29th | Republican | 2.92% |
| Washington 8th | Republican | 2.92% |
| California 4th | Republican | 3.18% |
| Connecticut 4th | Republican | 3.38% |
| Kansas 2nd | Democratic (flip) | 3.46% |
| Florida 22nd | Democratic (flip) | 3.75% |
| Pennsylvania 4th | Democratic (flip) | 3.85% |
| Michigan 7th | Republican | 3.95% |
| New York 26th | Republican | 3.96% |
| Arizona 5th | Democratic (flip) | 3.97% |
| Ohio 1st | Republican | 4.50% |
| Indiana 9th | Democratic (flip) | 4.52% |
| Idaho 1st | Republican | 5.14% |
| Michigan 9th | Republican | 5.34% |
| Iowa 3rd | Democratic | 5.40% (Note: This seat was the tipping point seat) |
| Nevada 2nd | Republican | 5.41% |
| Minnesota 1st | Democratic (flip) | 5.62% |
| Pennsylvania 10th | Democratic (flip) | 5.90% |
| New York 20th | Democratic (flip) | 6.20% |
| California 11th | Democratic (flip) | 6.54% |
| Illinois 10th | Republican | 6.76% |
| Illinois 8th | Democratic | 6.89% |
| Florida 8th | Republican | 7.06% |
| New Hampshire 2nd | Democratic (flip) | 7.10% |
| Indiana 7th | Democratic | 7.52% |
| North Carolina 11th | Democratic (flip) | 7.58% |
| Indiana 2nd | Democratic (flip) | 7.96% |
| Minnesota 6th | Republican | 7.98% |
| Arizona 1st | Republican | 8.30% |
| Kentucky 4th | Republican | 8.31% |
| Indiana 3rd | Republican | 8.56% |
| Texas 23rd | Democratic (flip) | 8.56% |
| Vermont at-large | Democratic (flip) | 8.68% |
| New York 24th | Democratic (flip) | 8.94% |
| Nebraska 2nd | Republican | 9.32% |
| California 50th | Republican | 9.64% |
| Nebraska 3rd | Republican | 9.98% |

== Special elections ==
There were two special elections in 2006 to the 109th United States Congress, listed here by date and district.

| District | Incumbent | | | This race | |
| District | Member | Party | First elected | Results | Candidates |
|---|---|---|---|---|---|
| California 50 | Duke Cunningham | Republican | 1990 | Incumbent resigned December 1, 2005 amid the Cunningham scandal. New member elected June 6, 2006. Republican hold. | ▌ ✓ Brian Bilbray (Republican) 49.6%; ▌Francine Busby (Democratic) 45.0%; ▌William Griffith (Write-in) 3.8%; ▌Paul King (Libertarian) 1.6% |
| New Jersey 13 | Bob Menendez | Democratic | 1992 | Incumbent resigned January 16, 2006 to become U.S. Senator. New member elected November 8, 2006. Democratic hold. | ▌Albio Sires (Democratic) 96.68%; ▌Dick Hester (Independent) 3.32% |
| Texas 22 | Tom DeLay | Republican | 1984 | Incumbent resigned June 9, 2006 following indictment. New member elected November 7, 2006. Republican hold. | ▌ ✓ Shelley Sekula-Gibbs (Republican) 62.5%; ▌Bob Smither (Libertarian) 18.7%; ▌Steve Stockman (Republican) 10.8%; ▌Don Richardson (Republican) 6.0%; ▌Giannibicego Hoa Tran (Republican) 2.1% |

== Alabama ==
| District | | Incumbent | | | Results | Candidates |
| District | 2004 CPVI | Representative | Party | First elected | Results | Candidates |
|---|---|---|---|---|---|---|
| Alabama 1 | R+12 | Jo Bonner | Republican | 2002 | Incumbent re-elected. | ▌ ✓ Jo Bonner (Republican) 68.1%; ▌Vivian Beckerle (Democratic) 31.8% |
| Alabama 2 | R+13 | Terry Everett | Republican | 1992 | Incumbent re-elected. | ▌ ✓ Terry Everett (Republican) 69.5%; ▌Chuck James (Democratic) 30.4% |
| Alabama 3 | R+4 | Mike D. Rogers | Republican | 2002 | Incumbent re-elected. | ▌ ✓ Mike D. Rogers (Republican) 59.4%; ▌Greg Pierce (Democratic) 38.5%; ▌Mark Layfield (Independent) 2.1% |
| Alabama 4 | R+16 | Robert Aderholt | Republican | 1996 | Incumbent re-elected. | ▌ ✓ Robert Aderholt (Republican) 70.2%; ▌Barbara Bobo (Democratic) 29.7% |
| Alabama 5 | R+6 | Bud Cramer | Democratic | 1990 | Incumbent re-elected. | ▌ ✓ Bud Cramer (Democratic) 98.3% |
| Alabama 6 | R+25 | Spencer Bachus | Republican | 1992 | Incumbent re-elected. | ▌ ✓ Spencer Bachus (Republican) 98.3% |
| Alabama 7 | D+17 | Artur Davis | Democratic | 2002 | Incumbent re-elected. | ▌ ✓ Artur Davis (Democratic) 99.0% |

== Alaska ==
| District | | Incumbent | | | Results | Candidates |
| District | 2004 CPVI | Representative | Party | First elected | Results | Candidates |
|---|---|---|---|---|---|---|
| Alaska at-large | R+14 | Don Young | Republican | 1973 (special) | Incumbent re-elected. | ▌ ✓ Don Young (Republican) 56.8%; ▌Diane Benson (Democratic) 40.2%; ▌Alexander Crawford (Libertarian) 1.7%; ▌Eva Ince (Green) 0.8%; ▌Bill Ratigan (Independent) 0.7% |

== Arizona ==
| District | | Incumbent | | | Results | Candidates |
| District | 2004 CPVI | Representative | Party | First elected | Results | Candidates |
|---|---|---|---|---|---|---|
| Arizona 1 | R+2 | Rick Renzi | Republican | 2002 | Incumbent re-elected. | ▌ ✓ Rick Renzi (Republican) 51.8%; ▌Ellen Simon (Democratic) 43.4%; ▌David Schlosser (Libertarian) 4.8% |
| Arizona 2 | R+9 | Trent Franks | Republican | 2002 | Incumbent re-elected. | ▌ ✓ Trent Franks (Republican) 58.6%; ▌John Thrasher (Democratic) 38.9%; ▌Powell Gammill (Libertarian) 2.5% |
| Arizona 3 | R+6 | John Shadegg | Republican | 1994 | Incumbent re-elected. | ▌ ✓ John Shadegg (Republican) 59.3%; ▌Don Chilton (Democratic) 38.2%; ▌Mark Yannone (Libertarian) 2.5% |
| Arizona 4 | D+14 | Ed Pastor | Democratic | 1991 (special) | Incumbent re-elected. | ▌ ✓ Ed Pastor (Democratic) 72.5%; ▌Don Karg (Republican) 23.9%; ▌Ronald Harders (Libertarian) 3.6% |
| Arizona 5 | R+4 | J. D. Hayworth | Republican | 1994 | Incumbent lost re-election. Democratic gain. | ▌ ✓ Harry Mitchell (Democratic) 50.4%; ▌J. D. Hayworth (Republican) 46.4%; ▌Warren Severin (Libertarian) 3.1% |
| Arizona 6 | R+12 | Jeff Flake | Republican | 2000 | Incumbent re-elected. | ▌ ✓ Jeff Flake (Republican) 74.8%; ▌Jason Blair (Libertarian) 25.2% |
| Arizona 7 | D+12 | Raúl Grijalva | Democratic | 2002 | Incumbent re-elected. | ▌ ✓ Raúl Grijalva (Democratic) 61.1%; ▌Ron Drake (Republican) 35.4%; ▌Joe Cobb (Libertarian) 3.6% |
| Arizona 8 | R+1 | Jim Kolbe | Republican | 1984 | Incumbent retired. New member elected. Democratic gain. | ▌ ✓ Gabby Giffords (Democratic) 54.3%; ▌Randy Graf (Republican) 42.1%; ▌David Nolan (Libertarian) 1.9%; ▌Jay Quick (Independent) 1.7% |

== Arkansas ==
| District | | Incumbent | | | Results | Candidates |
| District | 2004 CPVI | Representative | Party | First elected | Results | Candidates |
|---|---|---|---|---|---|---|
| Arkansas 1 | R+1 | Marion Berry | Democratic | 1996 | Incumbent re-elected. | ▌ ✓ Marion Berry (Democratic) 69.2%; ▌Mickey Stumbaugh (Republican) 30.8% |
| Arkansas 2 | EVEN | Vic Snyder | Democratic | 1996 | Incumbent re-elected. | ▌ ✓ Vic Snyder (Democratic) 60.5%; ▌Andy Mayberry (Republican) 39.5% |
| Arkansas 3 | R+11 | John Boozman | Republican | 2000 | Incumbent re-elected. | ▌ ✓ John Boozman (Republican) 62.4%; ▌Woodrow Anderson (Democratic) 37.6% |
| Arkansas 4 | EVEN | Mike Ross | Democratic | 2000 | Incumbent re-elected. | ▌ ✓ Mike Ross (Democratic) 74.5%; ▌Joe Ross (Republican) 25.5% |

== California ==
| District | | Incumbent | | | Results | Candidates |
| District | 2004 CPVI | Representative | Party | First elected | Results | Candidates |
|---|---|---|---|---|---|---|
| California 1 | D+10 | Mike Thompson | Democratic | 1998 | Incumbent re-elected. | ▌ ✓ Mike Thompson (Democratic) 66.3%; ▌John Jones (Republican) 29.0%; ▌Pamela Elizondo (Green) 3.1%; ▌Tim Stock (Peace and Freedom) 1.6% |
| California 2 | R+13 | Wally Herger | Republican | 1988 | Incumbent re-elected. | ▌ ✓ Wally Herger (Republican) 64.2%; ▌Arjinderpal Sekhon (Democratic) 32.5%; ▌E. Kent Hinesley (Libertarian) 3.3% |
| California 3 | R+7 | Dan Lungren | Republican | 1978; 1988 (retired); 2004 | Incumbent re-elected. | ▌ ✓ Dan Lungren (Republican) 59.5%; ▌Bill Durston (Democratic) 37.9%; ▌Douglas Arthur Tuma (Libertarian) 1.6%; ▌Mike Roskey (Peace and Freedom) 1.0% |
| California 4 | R+11 | John Doolittle | Republican | 1990 | Incumbent re-elected. | ▌ ✓ John Doolittle (Republican) 49.9%; ▌Charles Brown (Democratic) 45.4%; ▌Dan Warren (Libertarian) 5.0% |
| California 5 | D+14 | Doris Matsui | Democratic | 2005 (special) | Incumbent re-elected. | ▌ ✓ Doris Matsui (Democratic) 70.8%; ▌X. Claire Yan (Republican) 23.6%; ▌Jeff Kravitz (Green) 4.3%; ▌John C. Reiger (Peace and Freedom) 1.3% |
| California 6 | D+21 | Lynn Woolsey | Democratic | 1992 | Incumbent re-elected. | ▌ ✓ Lynn Woolsey (Democratic) 70.3%; ▌Todd Hopper (Republican) 26.1%; ▌Rich Friesen (Libertarian) 3.6% |
| California 7 | D+19 | George Miller | Democratic | 1974 | Incumbent re-elected. | ▌ ✓ George Miller (Democratic) 83.9%; ▌Camden McConnell (Libertarian) 16.1% |
| California 8 | D+36 | Nancy Pelosi | Democratic | 1987 (special) | Incumbent re-elected. | ▌ ✓ Nancy Pelosi (Democratic) 80.4%; ▌Mike DeNunzio (Republican) 10.8%; ▌Krissy Keefer (Green) 7.4%; ▌Philip Berg (Libertarian) 1.4% |
| California 9 | D+38 | Barbara Lee | Democratic | 1998 | Incumbent re-elected. | ▌ ✓ Barbara Lee (Democratic) 86.4%; ▌John den Dulk (Republican) 10.7%; ▌James Eyer (Libertarian) 2.9% |
| California 10 | D+8 | Ellen Tauscher | Democratic | 1996 | Incumbent re-elected. | ▌ ✓ Ellen Tauscher (Democratic) 66.5%; ▌Darcy Linn (Republican) 33.5% |
| California 11 | R+3 | Richard Pombo | Republican | 1992 | Incumbent lost re-election. Democratic gain. | ▌ ✓ Jerry McNerney (Democratic) 53.2%; ▌Richard Pombo (Republican) 46.8% |
| California 12 | D+22 | Tom Lantos | Democratic | 1980 | Incumbent re-elected. | ▌ ✓ Tom Lantos (Democratic) 76.1%; ▌Michael Moloney (Republican) 23.9% |
| California 13 | D+22 | Pete Stark | Democratic | 1972 | Incumbent re-elected. | ▌ ✓ Pete Stark (Democratic) 74.9%; ▌George Bruno (Republican) 25.1% |
| California 14 | D+18 | Anna Eshoo | Democratic | 1992 | Incumbent re-elected. | ▌ ✓ Anna Eshoo (Democratic) 71.1%; ▌Rob Smith (Republican) 24.3%; ▌Brian Holtz (Libertarian) 2.3%; ▌Carol Brouillet (Green) 2.3% |
| California 15 | D+14 | Mike Honda | Democratic | 2000 | Incumbent re-elected. | ▌ ✓ Mike Honda (Democratic) 72.4%; ▌Raymond Chukwu (Republican) 27.6% |
| California 16 | D+16 | Zoe Lofgren | Democratic | 1994 | Incumbent re-elected. | ▌ ✓ Zoe Lofgren (Democratic) 72.8%; ▌Charel Winston (Republican) 27.2% |
| California 17 | D+17 | Sam Farr | Democratic | 1992 | Incumbent re-elected. | ▌ ✓ Sam Farr (Democratic) 75.9%; ▌Anthony DeMaio (Republican) 22.6% |
| California 18 | D+3 | Dennis Cardoza | Democratic | 2002 | Incumbent re-elected. | ▌ ✓ Dennis Cardoza (Democratic) 65.4%; ▌John Kanno (Republican) 34.6% |
| California 19 | R+10 | George Radanovich | Republican | 1996 | Incumbent re-elected. | ▌ ✓ George Radanovich (Republican) 60.6%; ▌T.J. Cox (Democratic) 39.4% |
| California 20 | D+5 | Jim Costa | Democratic | 2004 | Incumbent re-elected. | ▌ ✓ Jim Costa (Democratic) Uncontested |
| California 21 | R+13 | Devin Nunes | Republican | 2002 | Incumbent re-elected. | ▌ ✓ Devin Nunes (Republican) 66.6%; ▌Steven Haze (Democratic) 30.1%; ▌John Miller (Green) 3.3% |
| California 22 | R+16 | Bill Thomas | Republican | 1978 | Incumbent retired. Republican hold. | ▌ ✓ Kevin McCarthy (Republican) 70.8%; ▌Sharon Beery (Democratic) 29.2% |
| California 23 | D+9 | Lois Capps | Democratic | 1998 | Incumbent re-elected. | ▌ ✓ Lois Capps (Democratic) 65.2%; ▌Victor Tognazzini (Republican) 34.8% |
| California 24 | R+5 | Elton Gallegly | Republican | 1986 | Incumbent re-elected. | ▌ ✓ Elton Gallegly (Republican) 62.1%; ▌Jill Martinez (Democratic) 37.9% |
| California 25 | R+7 | Buck McKeon | Republican | 1992 | Incumbent re-elected. | ▌ ✓ Buck McKeon (Republican) 60.1%; ▌Robert Rodriguez (Democratic) 35.6%; ▌David Erickson (Libertarian) 4.3% |
| California 26 | R+4 | David Dreier | Republican | 1980 | Incumbent re-elected. | ▌ ✓ David Dreier (Republican) 57.0%; ▌Cynthia Matthews (Democratic) 37.9%; ▌Ted Brown (Libertarian) 3.3%; ▌Elliott Graham (American Independent) 1.8% |
| California 27 | D+13 | Brad Sherman | Democratic | 1996 | Incumbent re-elected. | ▌ ✓ Brad Sherman (Democratic) 68.8%; ▌Peter Hankwitz (Republican) 31.2% |
| California 28 | D+25 | Howard Berman | Democratic | 1982 | Incumbent re-elected. | ▌ ✓ Howard Berman (Democratic) 74.0%; ▌Stanley Kesselman (Republican) 19.1%; ▌Byron De Lear (Green) 3.5%; ▌Kelley Ross (Libertarian) 3.4% |
| California 29 | D+12 | Adam Schiff | Democratic | 2000 | Incumbent re-elected. | ▌ ✓ Adam Schiff (Democratic) 63.5%; ▌Bill Bodell (Republican) 27.5%; ▌Bill Paparian (Green) 5.7%; ▌Lydia Llamas (Peace and Freedom) 1.8%; ▌Jim Keller (Libertarian) 1.5% |
| California 30 | D+20 | Henry Waxman | Democratic | 1974 | Incumbent re-elected. | ▌ ✓ Henry Waxman (Democratic) 71.5%; ▌David Jones (Republican) 26.4%; ▌Adele Cannon (Peace and Freedom) 2.1% |
| California 31 | D+30 | Xavier Becerra | Democratic | 1992 | Incumbent re-elected. | ▌ ✓ Xavier Becerra (Democratic) Uncontested |
| California 32 | D+17 | Hilda Solis | Democratic | 2000 | Incumbent re-elected. | ▌ ✓ Hilda Solis (Democratic) 83.0%; ▌Leland Faegre (Libertarian) 17.0% |
| California 33 | D+36 | Diane Watson | Democratic | 2001 (special) | Incumbent re-elected. | ▌ ✓ Diane Watson (Democratic) Uncontested |
| California 34 | D+23 | Lucille Roybal-Allard | Democratic | 1992 | Incumbent re-elected. | ▌ ✓ Lucille Roybal-Allard (Democratic) 76.8%; ▌Wayne Miller (Republican) 23.2% |
| California 35 | D+33 | Maxine Waters | Democratic | 1990 | Incumbent re-elected. | ▌ ✓ Maxine Waters (Democratic) 83.8%; ▌Gordon Michael Mego (American Independent) 8.5%; ▌Paul Ireland (Libertarian) 7.7% |
| California 36 | D+11 | Jane Harman | Democratic | 1992; 1998 (retired); 2000 | Incumbent re-elected. | ▌ ✓ Jane Harman (Democratic) 63.4%; ▌Brian Gibson (Republican) 32.0%; ▌Jim Smith (Peace and Freedom) 2.7%; ▌Michael J. Binkley (Libertarian) 1.9% |
| California 37 | D+27 | Juanita Millender-McDonald | Democratic | 1996 | Incumbent re-elected. | ▌ ✓ Juanita Millender-McDonald (Democratic) 82.4%; ▌Herb Peters (Libertarian) 17.6% |
| California 38 | D+20 | Grace Napolitano | Democratic | 1998 | Incumbent re-elected. | ▌ ✓ Grace Napolitano (Democratic) 75.4%; ▌Sid Street (Republican) 24.6% |
| California 39 | D+13 | Linda Sánchez | Democratic | 2002 | Incumbent re-elected. | ▌ ✓ Linda Sánchez (Democratic) 65.9%; ▌James Andion (Republican) 34.1% |
| California 40 | R+8 | Ed Royce | Republican | 1992 | Incumbent re-elected. | ▌ ✓ Ed Royce (Republican) 66.8%; ▌Florice Hoffman (Democratic) 30.7%; ▌Philip Inman (Libertarian) 2.5% |
| California 41 | R+9 | Jerry Lewis | Republican | 1978 | Incumbent re-elected. | ▌ ✓ Jerry Lewis (Republican) 67.0%; ▌Louis Contreras (Democratic) 33.0% |
| California 42 | R+10 | Gary Miller | Republican | 1998 | Incumbent re-elected. | ▌ ✓ Gary Miller (Republican) Uncontested |
| California 43 | D+13 | Joe Baca | Democratic | 1999 (special) | Incumbent re-elected. | ▌ ✓ Joe Baca (Democratic) 64.5%; ▌Scott Folkens (Republican) 35.5% |
| California 44 | R+6 | Ken Calvert | Republican | 1992 | Incumbent re-elected. | ▌ ✓ Ken Calvert (Republican) 60.0%; ▌Louis Vandenberg (Democratic) 37.1%; ▌Kevin Akin (Peace and Freedom) 2.9% |
| California 45 | R+3 | Mary Bono | Republican | 1998 | Incumbent re-elected. | ▌ ✓ Mary Bono (Republican) 60.7%; ▌David Roth (Democratic) 39.3% |
| California 46 | R+6 | Dana Rohrabacher | Republican | 1988 | Incumbent re-elected. | ▌ ✓ Dana Rohrabacher (Republican) 59.6%; ▌Jim Brandt (Democratic) 36.7%; ▌Dennis Chang (Libertarian) 3.7% |
| California 47 | D+5 | Loretta Sanchez | Democratic | 1996 | Incumbent re-elected. | ▌ ✓ Loretta Sanchez (Democratic) 62.4%; ▌Tan Nguyan (Republican) 37.6% |
| California 48 | R+8 | John Campbell | Republican | 2005 (special) | Incumbent re-elected. | ▌ ✓ John Campbell (Republican) 60.0%; ▌Steve Young (Democratic) 37.2%; ▌Bruce David Cohen (Libertarian) 2.8% |
| California 49 | R+10 | Darrell Issa | Republican | 2000 | Incumbent re-elected. | ▌ ✓ Darrell Issa (Republican) 63.4%; ▌Jeeni Criscenzo (Democratic) 33.5%; ▌Lars Grossmith (Libertarian) 3.1% |
| California 50 | R+5 | Brian Bilbray | Republican | 1994; 2000 (defeated); 2006 (special) | Incumbent re-elected. | ▌ ✓ Brian Bilbray (Republican) 53.2%; ▌Francine Busby (Democratic) 43.5%; ▌Paul King (Libertarian) 1.8%; ▌Miriam E. Clark (Peace and Freedom) 1.5% |
| California 51 | D+7 | Bob Filner | Democratic | 1992 | Incumbent re-elected. | ▌ ✓ Bob Filner (Democratic) 67.5%; ▌Blake Miles (Republican) 30.1%; ▌Dan Litwin (Libertarian) 2.4% |
| California 52 | R+9 | Duncan L. Hunter | Republican | 1980 | Incumbent re-elected. | ▌ ✓ Duncan L. Hunter (Republican) 64.7%; ▌John Rinaldi (Democratic) 32.0%; ▌Michael Benoit (Libertarian) 3.3% |
| California 53 | D+12 | Susan Davis | Democratic | 2000 | Incumbent re-elected. | ▌ ✓ Susan Davis (Democratic) 67.6%; ▌John Woodrum (Republican) 30.0%; ▌Ernest Lippe (Libertarian) 2.4% |

== Colorado ==
| District | | Incumbent | | | Results | Candidates |
| District | 2004 CPVI | Representative | Party | First elected | Results | Candidates |
|---|---|---|---|---|---|---|
| Colorado 1 | D+18 | Diana DeGette | Democratic | 1996 | Incumbent re-elected. | ▌ ✓ Diana DeGette (Democratic) 79.8%; ▌Tom Kelly (Green) 20.2% |
| Colorado 2 | D+8 | Mark Udall | Democratic | 1998 | Incumbent re-elected. | ▌ ✓ Mark Udall (Democratic) 68.3%; ▌Rich Mancuso (Republican) 28.3%; ▌Norm Olsen (Libertarian) 2.2%; ▌Joe Calhoun (Green) 1.3% |
| Colorado 3 | R+6 | John Salazar | Democratic | 2004 | Incumbent re-elected. | ▌ ✓ John Salazar (Democratic) 61.6%; ▌Scott Tipton (Republican) 36.5%; ▌Bob Sargent (Libertarian) 1.9% |
| Colorado 4 | R+9 | Marilyn Musgrave | Republican | 2002 | Incumbent re-elected. | ▌ ✓ Marilyn Musgrave (Republican) 45.6%; ▌Angie Paccione (Democratic) 43.1%; ▌Eric Eidsness (Reform) 11.3% |
| Colorado 5 | R+16 | Joel Hefley | Republican | 1986 | Incumbent retired. Republican hold. | ▌ ✓ Doug Lamborn (Republican) 59.6%; ▌Jay Fawcett (Democratic) 40.4% |
| Colorado 6 | R+10 | Tom Tancredo | Republican | 1998 | Incumbent re-elected. | ▌ ✓ Tom Tancredo (Republican) 58.6%; ▌Bill Winter (Democratic) 39.9%; ▌Jack Woehr (Libertarian) 1.5% |
| Colorado 7 | D+2 | Bob Beauprez | Republican | 2002 | Incumbent retired to run for Governor. Democratic gain. | ▌ ✓ Ed Perlmutter (Democratic) 54.9%; ▌Rick O'Donnell (Republican) 42.1%; ▌Dave Chandler (Green) 1.6%; ▌Roger McCarville (Constitution) 1.4% |

== Connecticut ==
| District | | Incumbent | | | Results | Candidates |
| District | 2004 CPVI | Representative | Party | First elected | Results | Candidates |
|---|---|---|---|---|---|---|
| Connecticut 1 | D+14 | John B. Larson | Democratic | 1998 | Incumbent re-elected. | ▌ ✓ John B. Larson (Democratic) 74.5%; ▌Scott MacLean (Republican) 25.5% |
| Connecticut 2 | D+8 | Rob Simmons | Republican | 2000 | Incumbent lost re-election. Democratic gain. | ▌ ✓ Joe Courtney (Democratic) 50.02%; ▌Rob Simmons (Republican) 49.98% |
| Connecticut 3 | D+12 | Rosa DeLauro | Democratic | 1990 | Incumbent re-elected. | ▌ ✓ Rosa DeLauro (Democratic) 76.0%; ▌Joseph Vollano (Republican) 22.4%; ▌Daniel Sumrall (Green) 1.6% |
| Connecticut 4 | D+5 | Chris Shays | Republican | 1987 (special) | Incumbent re-elected. | ▌ ✓ Chris Shays (Republican) 50.9%; ▌Diane Farrell (Democratic) 47.6%; ▌Phil Maymin (Libertarian) 1.5% |
| Connecticut 5 | D+4 | Nancy Johnson | Republican | 1982 | Incumbent lost re-election. Democratic gain. | ▌ ✓ Chris Murphy (Democratic) 56.5%; ▌Nancy Johnson (Republican) 43.5% |

== Delaware ==
| District | | Incumbent | | | Results | Candidates |
| District | 2004 CPVI | Representative | Party | First elected | Results | Candidates |
|---|---|---|---|---|---|---|
| Delaware at-large | D+7 | Mike Castle | Republican | 1992 | Incumbent re-elected. | ▌ ✓ Mike Castle (Republican) 57.2%; ▌Dennis Spivack (Democratic) 38.8%; ▌Karen Hartley-Nagle (Independent) 2.2%; ▌Michael Berg (Green) 1.8% |

== Florida ==
| District | | Incumbent | | | Results | Candidates |
| District | 2004 CPVI | Representative | Party | First elected | Results | Candidates |
|---|---|---|---|---|---|---|
| Florida 1 | R+19 | Jeff Miller | Republican | 2001 (special) | Incumbent re-elected. | ▌ ✓ Jeff Miller (Republican) 68.5%; ▌Joe Roberts (Democratic) 31.5% |
| Florida 2 | R+2 | Allen Boyd | Democratic | 1996 | Incumbent re-elected. | ▌ ✓ Allen Boyd (Democratic); Uncontested |
| Florida 3 | D+17 | Corrine Brown | Democratic | 1992 | Incumbent re-elected. | ▌ ✓ Corrine Brown (Democratic); Uncontested |
| Florida 4 | R+16 | Ander Crenshaw | Republican | 2000 | Incumbent re-elected. | ▌ ✓ Ander Crenshaw (Republican) 69.7%; ▌Bob Harms (Democratic) 30.3% |
| Florida 5 | R+5 | Ginny Brown-Waite | Republican | 2002 | Incumbent re-elected. | ▌ ✓ Ginny Brown-Waite (Republican) 59.9%; ▌John T. Russell (Democratic) 40.1% |
| Florida 6 | R+8 | Cliff Stearns | Republican | 1988 | Incumbent re-elected. | ▌ ✓ Cliff Stearns (Republican) 59.9%; ▌Dave Bruderly (Democratic) 40.1% |
| Florida 7 | R+3 | John Mica | Republican | 1992 | Incumbent re-elected. | ▌ ✓ John Mica (Republican) 63.1%; ▌Jack Chagnon (Democratic) 36.9% |
| Florida 8 | R+3 | Ric Keller | Republican | 2000 | Incumbent re-elected. | ▌ ✓ Ric Keller (Republican) 52.8%; ▌Charlie Stuart (Democratic) 45.7%; ▌Wesley Hoaglund (Independent) 1.5% |
| Florida 9 | R+4 | Michael Bilirakis | Republican | 1982 | Incumbent retired. Republican hold. | ▌ ✓ Gus Bilirakis (Republican) 55.9%; ▌Phyllis Busansky (Democratic) 44.1% |
| Florida 10 | D+1 | Bill Young | Republican | 1970 | Incumbent re-elected. | ▌ ✓ Bill Young (Republican) 65.9%; ▌Samm Simpson (Democratic) 34.1% |
| Florida 11 | D+11 | Jim Davis | Democratic | 1996 | Incumbent retired to run for Governor. Democratic hold. | ▌ ✓ Kathy Castor (Democratic) 69.7%; ▌Eddie Adams (Republican) 30.3% |
| Florida 12 | R+5 | Adam Putnam | Republican | 2000 | Incumbent re-elected. | ▌ ✓ Adam Putnam (Republican) 69.1%; ▌Joe Viscusi (Independent) 19.4%; ▌Ed Bowlin (Independent) 11.5% |
| Florida 13 | R+4 | Katherine Harris | Republican | 2002 | Incumbent retired to run for U.S. Senator. Republican hold. | ▌ ✓ Vern Buchanan (Republican) 50.1%; ▌Christine Jennings (Democratic) 49.9% |
| Florida 14 | R+10 | Connie Mack IV | Republican | 2004 | Incumbent re-elected. | ▌ ✓ Connie Mack IV (Republican) 64.4%; ▌Robert Neeld (Democratic) 35.6% |
| Florida 15 | R+4 | Dave Weldon | Republican | 1994 | Incumbent re-elected. | ▌ ✓ Dave Weldon (Republican) 56.3%; ▌Bob Bowman (Democratic) 43.7% |
| Florida 16 | R+2 | Vacant | | | Rep. Mark Foley (R) resigned September 29, 2006. Democratic gain. | ▌ ✓ Tim Mahoney (Democratic) 49.5%; ▌Joe Negron (Republican) 47.7%; ▌Emmie Lee Ross (Independent) 2.8% |
| Florida 17 | D+35 | Kendrick Meek | Democratic | 2002 | Incumbent re-elected. | ▌ ✓ Kendrick Meek (Democratic) 100% |
| Florida 18 | R+4 | Ileana Ros-Lehtinen | Republican | 1989 (special) | Incumbent re-elected. | ▌ ✓ Ileana Ros-Lehtinen (Republican) 62.1%; ▌David Patlak (Democratic) 37.9% |
| Florida 19 | D+21 | Robert Wexler | Democratic | 1996 | Incumbent re-elected. | ▌ ✓ Robert Wexler (Democratic); Uncontested |
| Florida 20 | D+18 | Debbie Wasserman Schultz | Democratic | 2004 | Incumbent re-elected. | ▌ ✓ Debbie Wasserman Schultz (Democratic); Uncontested |
| Florida 21 | R+6 | Lincoln Díaz-Balart | Republican | 1992 | Incumbent re-elected. | ▌ ✓ Lincoln Díaz-Balart (Republican) 59.5%; ▌Frank Gonzalez (Democratic) 40.5% |
| Florida 22 | D+4 | Clay Shaw | Republican | 1980 | Incumbent lost re-election. Democratic gain. | ▌ ✓ Ron Klein (Democratic) 50.9%; ▌Clay Shaw (Republican) 47.1%; ▌Neil Evangelista (Libertarian) 2.0% |
| Florida 23 | D+29 | Alcee Hastings | Democratic | 1992 | Incumbent re-elected. | ▌ ✓ Alcee Hastings (Democratic); Uncontested |
| Florida 24 | R+3 | Tom Feeney | Republican | 2002 | Incumbent re-elected. | ▌ ✓ Tom Feeney (Republican) 57.9%; ▌Clint Curtis (Democratic) 42.1% |
| Florida 25 | R+4 | Mario Díaz-Balart | Republican | 2002 | Incumbent re-elected. | ▌ ✓ Mario Díaz-Balart (Republican) 58.5%; ▌Michael Calderin (Democratic) 41.5% |

== Georgia ==
Georgia's delegation was redistricted in 2005.

| District | | Incumbent | | | Results | Candidates |
| District | 2004 CPVI | Representative | Party | First elected | Results | Candidates |
|---|---|---|---|---|---|---|
| Georgia 1 | R+14 | Jack Kingston | Republican | 1992 | Incumbent re-elected. | ▌ ✓ Jack Kingston (Republican) 68.5%; ▌Jim Nelson (Democratic) 31.5% |
| Georgia 2 | D+2 | Sanford Bishop | Democratic | 1992 | Incumbent re-elected. | ▌ ✓ Sanford Bishop (Democratic) 67.9%; ▌Brad Hughes (Republican) 32.1% |
| Georgia 3 | R+19 | Lynn Westmoreland; Redistricted from the 8th district | Republican | 2004 | Incumbent re-elected. | ▌ ✓ Lynn Westmoreland (Republican) 67.6%; ▌Mike McGraw (Democratic) 32.4% |
| Georgia 4 | D+22 | Cynthia McKinney | Democratic | 1992; 2002 (lost renomination); 2004 | Incumbent lost renomination. New member elected. Democratic hold. | ▌ ✓ Hank Johnson (Democratic) 75.4%; ▌Catherine Davis (Republican) 24.6% |
| Georgia 5 | D+25 | John Lewis | Democratic | 1986 | Incumbent re-elected. | ▌ ✓ John Lewis (Democratic) 100% |
| Georgia 6 | R+19 | Tom Price | Republican | 2004 | Incumbent re-elected. | ▌ ✓ Tom Price (Republican) 72.4%; ▌Steve Sinton (Democratic) 27.6% |
| Georgia 7 | R+19 | John Linder | Republican | 1992 | Incumbent re-elected. | ▌ ✓ John Linder (Republican) 70.9%; ▌Allan Burns (Democratic) 29.1% |
| Georgia 8 | R+8 | Jim Marshall; Redistricted from the 3rd district | Democratic | 2002 | Incumbent re-elected. | ▌ ✓ Jim Marshall (Democratic) 50.5%; ▌Mac Collins (Republican) 49.5% |
| Georgia 9 | R+24 | Nathan Deal; Redistricted from the 10th district | Republican | 1992 (Note: Deal was originally elected as a Democrat. He switched parties in April 1995.) | Incumbent re-elected. | ▌ ✓ Nathan Deal (Republican) 76.6%; ▌John Bradbury (Democratic) 23.4% |
| Georgia 10 | R+14 | Charlie Norwood; Redistricted from the 9th district | Republican | 1994 | Incumbent re-elected. | ▌ ✓ Charlie Norwood (Republican) 67.4%; ▌Terry Holley (Democratic) 32.6% |
| Georgia 11 | R+18 | Phil Gingrey | Republican | 2002 | Incumbent re-elected. | ▌ ✓ Phil Gingrey (Republican) 71.1%; ▌Patrick Pillion (Democratic) 28.9% |
| Georgia 12 | D+2 | John Barrow | Democratic | 2004 | Incumbent re-elected. | ▌ ✓ John Barrow (Democratic) 50.3%; ▌Max Burns (Republican) 49.7% |
| Georgia 13 | D+10 | David Scott | Democratic | 2002 | Incumbent re-elected. | ▌ ✓ David Scott (Democratic) 69.2%; ▌Deborah Honeycutt (Republican) 30.8% |

== Hawaii ==
| District | | Incumbent | | | Results | Candidates |
| District | 2004 CPVI | Representative | Party | First elected | Results | Candidates |
|---|---|---|---|---|---|---|
| Hawaii 1 | D+7 | Neil Abercrombie | Democratic | 1986 (special); 1988 (lost renomination); 1990 | Incumbent re-elected. | ▌ ✓ Neil Abercrombie (Democratic) 69.4%; ▌Richard Hough (Republican) 30.6% |
| Hawaii 2 | D+10 | Ed Case | Democratic | 2002 (special) | Incumbent retired to run for U.S. Senator. Democratic hold. | ▌ ✓ Mazie Hirono (Democratic) 61.0%; ▌Bob Hogue (Republican) 39.0% |

== Idaho ==
| District | | Incumbent | | | Results | Candidates |
| District | 2004 CPVI | Representative | Party | First elected | Results | Candidates |
|---|---|---|---|---|---|---|
| Idaho 1 | R+19 | Butch Otter | Republican | 2000 | Incumbent retired to run for Governor. Republican hold. | ▌ ✓ Bill Sali (Republican) 49.9%; ▌Larry Grant (Democratic) 44.8%; ▌Dave Olson (Independent) 3.0%; ▌Andy Hedden-Nicely (United) 1.2%; ▌Paul Smith (Constitution) 1.1% |
| Idaho 2 | R+23 | Mike Simpson | Republican | 1998 | Incumbent re-elected. | ▌ ✓ Mike Simpson (Republican) 62.0%; ▌Jim Hansen (Democratic) 34.4%; ▌Cameron Firth (Independent) 2.4%; ▌Travis Hedrick (Constitution) 1.2% |

== Illinois ==
| District | | Incumbent | | | Results | Candidates |
| District | 2004 CPVI | Representative | Party | First elected | Results | Candidates |
|---|---|---|---|---|---|---|
| Illinois 1 | D+35 | Bobby Rush | Democratic | 1992 | Incumbent re-elected. | ▌ ✓ Bobby Rush (Democratic) 84.1%; ▌Jason Tabour (Republican) 15.9% |
| Illinois 2 | D+35 | Jesse Jackson Jr. | Democratic | 1995 (special) | Incumbent re-elected. | ▌ ✓ Jesse Jackson Jr. (Democratic) 84.8%; ▌Robert Belin (Republican) 11.8%; ▌Anthony Williams (Libertarian) 3.3% |
| Illinois 3 | D+10 | Dan Lipinski | Democratic | 2004 | Incumbent re-elected. | ▌ ✓ Dan Lipinski (Democratic) 77.1%; ▌Ray Wardingley (Republican) 22.9% |
| Illinois 4 | D+31 | Luis Gutiérrez | Democratic | 1992 | Incumbent re-elected. | ▌ ✓ Luis Gutiérrez (Democratic) 85.8%; ▌Ann Melichar (Republican) 14.2% |
| Illinois 5 | D+18 | Rahm Emanuel | Democratic | 2002 | Incumbent re-elected. | ▌ ✓ Rahm Emanuel (Democratic) 78.0%; ▌Kevin White (Republican) 22.0% |
| Illinois 6 | R+3 | Henry Hyde | Republican | 1974 | Incumbent retired. Republican hold. | ▌ ✓ Peter Roskam (Republican) 51.4%; ▌Tammy Duckworth (Democratic) 48.6% |
| Illinois 7 | D+35 | Danny K. Davis | Democratic | 1996 | Incumbent re-elected. | ▌ ✓ Danny K. Davis (Democratic) 86.7%; ▌Charles Hutchinson (Republican) 13.3% |
| Illinois 8 | R+5 | Melissa Bean | Democratic | 2004 | Incumbent re-elected. | ▌ ✓ Melissa Bean (Democratic) 50.9%; ▌David McSweeney (Republican) 44.0%; ▌Bill Scheurer (Independent) 5.1% |
| Illinois 9 | D+20 | Jan Schakowsky | Democratic | 1998 | Incumbent re-elected. | ▌ ✓ Jan Schakowsky (Democratic) 74.6%; ▌Michael Shannon (Republican) 25.4% |
| Illinois 10 | D+4 | Mark Kirk | Republican | 2000 | Incumbent re-elected. | ▌ ✓ Mark Kirk (Republican) 53.4%; ▌Daniel Seals (Democratic) 46.6% |
| Illinois 11 | R+1 | Jerry Weller | Republican | 1994 | Incumbent re-elected. | ▌ ✓ Jerry Weller (Republican) 55.1%; ▌John Pavich (Democratic) 44.9% |
| Illinois 12 | D+5 | Jerry Costello | Democratic | 1988 | Incumbent re-elected. | ▌ ✓ Jerry Costello (Democratic); Uncontested |
| Illinois 13 | R+5 | Judy Biggert | Republican | 1998 | Incumbent re-elected. | ▌ ✓ Judy Biggert (Republican) 58.3%; ▌Joseph Shannon (Democratic) 41.7% |
| Illinois 14 | R+5 | Dennis Hastert | Republican | 1986 | Incumbent re-elected. | ▌ ✓ Dennis Hastert (Republican) 59.8%; ▌John Laesch (Democratic) 40.2% |
| Illinois 15 | R+6 | Tim Johnson | Republican | 2000 | Incumbent re-elected. | ▌ ✓ Tim Johnson (Republican) 57.6%; ▌David Gill (Democratic) 42.4% |
| Illinois 16 | R+4 | Don Manzullo | Republican | 1992 | Incumbent re-elected. | ▌ ✓ Don Manzullo (Republican) 63.6%; ▌Richard Auman (Democratic) 32.1%; ▌John L. Borling (Write-in) 4.3% |
| Illinois 17 | D+5 | Lane Evans | Democratic | 1982 | Incumbent retired. Democratic hold. | ▌ ✓ Phil Hare (Democratic) 57.2%; ▌Andrea Lane Zinga (Republican) 42.8% |
| Illinois 18 | R+5 | Ray LaHood | Republican | 1994 | Incumbent re-elected. | ▌ ✓ Ray LaHood (Republican) 67.3%; ▌Steve Waterworth (Democratic) 32.7% |
| Illinois 19 | R+8 | John Shimkus | Republican | 1996 | Incumbent re-elected. | ▌ ✓ John Shimkus (Republican) 60.3%; ▌Dan Stover (Democratic) 39.7% |

== Indiana ==
| District | | Incumbent | | | Results | Candidates |
| District | 2004 CPVI | Representative | Party | First elected | Results | Candidates |
|---|---|---|---|---|---|---|
| Indiana 1 | D+8 | Pete Visclosky | Democratic | 1984 | Incumbent re-elected. | ▌ ✓ Pete Visclosky (Democratic) 69.7%; ▌Mark Leyva (Republican) 26.8%; ▌Charles Barman (Independent) 3.5% |
| Indiana 2 | R+4 | Chris Chocola | Republican | 2002 | Incumbent lost re-election. Democratic gain. | ▌ ✓ Joe Donnelly (Democratic) 54.0%; ▌Chris Chocola (Republican) 46.0% |
| Indiana 3 | R+16 | Mark Souder | Republican | 1994 | Incumbent re-elected. | ▌ ✓ Mark Souder (Republican) 54.3%; ▌Tom Hayhurst (Democratic) 45.7% |
| Indiana 4 | R+17 | Steve Buyer | Republican | 1992 | Incumbent re-elected. | ▌ ✓ Steve Buyer (Republican) 62.4%; ▌David Sanders (Democratic) 37.6% |
| Indiana 5 | R+20 | Dan Burton | Republican | 1982 | Incumbent re-elected. | ▌ ✓ Dan Burton (Republican) 65.0%; ▌Katherine Fox Carr (Democratic) 31.4%; ▌Sheri Sharlow (Libertarian) 3.6% |
| Indiana 6 | R+11 | Mike Pence | Republican | 2000 | Incumbent re-elected. | ▌ ✓ Mike Pence (Republican) 60.0%; ▌Barry Welsh (Democratic) 40.0% |
| Indiana 7 | D+9 | Julia Carson | Democratic | 1996 | Incumbent re-elected. | ▌ ✓ Julia Carson (Democratic) 53.8%; ▌Eric Dickerson (Republican) 46.2% |
| Indiana 8 | R+9 | John Hostettler | Republican | 1994 | Incumbent lost re-election. Democratic gain. | ▌ ✓ Brad Ellsworth (Democratic) 61.0%; ▌John Hostettler (Republican) 39.0% |
| Indiana 9 | R+7 | Mike Sodrel | Republican | 2004 | Incumbent lost re-election. Democratic gain. | ▌ ✓ Baron Hill (Democratic) 50.0%; ▌Mike Sodrel (Republican) 45.5%; ▌Eric Schansberg (Libertarian) 4.5% |

== Iowa ==
| District | | Incumbent | | | Results | Candidates |
| District | 2004 CPVI | Representative | Party | First elected | Results | Candidates |
|---|---|---|---|---|---|---|
| Iowa 1 | D+5 | Jim Nussle | Republican | 1990 | Incumbent retired to run for Governor. Democratic gain. | ▌ ✓ Bruce Braley (Democratic) 55.0%; ▌Mike Whalen (Republican) 43.3%; ▌James Hill (Pirate) 1.1%; ▌Al Schoeman (Libertarian) 0.6% |
| Iowa 2 | D+7 | Jim Leach | Republican | 1976 | Incumbent lost re-election. Democratic gain. | ▌ ✓ Dave Loebsack (Democratic) 51.4%; ▌Jim Leach (Republican) 48.6% |
| Iowa 3 | D+1 | Leonard Boswell | Democratic | 1996 | Incumbent re-elected. | ▌ ✓ Leonard Boswell (Democratic) 51.8%; ▌Jeff Lamberti (Republican) 46.7%; ▌Helen Meyers (Socialist Workers) 1.5% |
| Iowa 4 | EVEN | Tom Latham | Republican | 1994 | Incumbent re-elected. | ▌ ✓ Tom Latham (Republican) 57.4%; ▌Selden Spencer (Democratic) 42.6% |
| Iowa 5 | R+8 | Steve King | Republican | 2002 | Incumbent re-elected. | ▌ ✓ Steve King (Republican) 58.4%; ▌Joyce Schulte (Democratic) 35.7%; ▌Roy Nielsen (Independent) 4.5%; ▌Cheryl Broderson (Independent) 1.4% |

== Kansas ==
| District | | Incumbent | | | Results | Candidates |
| District | 2004 CPVI | Representative | Party | First elected | Results | Candidates |
|---|---|---|---|---|---|---|
| Kansas 1 | R+20 | Jerry Moran | Republican | 1996 | Incumbent re-elected. | ▌ ✓ Jerry Moran (Republican) 78.7%; ▌John Doll (Democratic) 19.9%; ▌Sylvester Cain (Reform) 1.4% |
| Kansas 2 | R+7 | Jim Ryun | Republican | 1996 | Incumbent lost re-election. Democratic gain. | ▌ ✓ Nancy Boyda (Democratic) 50.6%; ▌Jim Ryun (Republican) 47.1%; ▌Roger Tucker (Reform) 2.3% |
| Kansas 3 | R+4 | Dennis Moore | Democratic | 1998 | Incumbent re-elected. | ▌ ✓ Dennis Moore (Democratic) 64.5%; ▌Chuck Ahner (Republican) 33.8%; ▌Bob Conroy (Reform) 1.7% |
| Kansas 4 | R+12 | Todd Tiahrt | Republican | 1994 | Incumbent re-elected. | ▌ ✓ Todd Tiahrt (Republican) 63.7%; ▌Garth McGinn (Democratic) 33.8%; ▌Joy Holt (Reform) 2.5% |

== Kentucky ==
| District | | Incumbent | | | Results | Candidates |
| District | 2004 CPVI | Representative | Party | First elected | Results | Candidates |
|---|---|---|---|---|---|---|
| Kentucky 1 | R+10 | Ed Whitfield | Republican | 1994 | Incumbent re-elected. | ▌ ✓ Ed Whitfield (Republican) 59.6%; ▌Tom Barlow (Democratic) 40.4% |
| Kentucky 2 | R+13 | Ron Lewis | Republican | 1994 | Incumbent re-elected. | ▌ ✓ Ron Lewis (Republican) 55.4%; ▌Mike Weaver (Democratic) 44.6% |
| Kentucky 3 | D+2 | Anne Northup | Republican | 1996 | Incumbent lost re-election. Democratic gain. | ▌ ✓ John Yarmuth (Democratic) 50.6%; ▌Anne Northup (Republican) 48.2%; Others: ▌Donna Walker Mancini (Libertarian) 0.9%; ▌Ed Parker (Constitution) 0.3% |
| Kentucky 4 | R+12 | Geoff Davis | Republican | 2004 | Incumbent re-elected. | ▌ ✓ Geoff Davis (Republican) 51.7%; ▌Ken Lucas (Democratic) 43.4%; ▌Brian Houillion (Libertarian) 4.9% |
| Kentucky 5 | R+8 | Hal Rogers | Republican | 1980 | Incumbent re-elected. | ▌ ✓ Hal Rogers (Republican) 73.8%; ▌Kenneth Stepp (Democratic) 26.2% |
| Kentucky 6 | R+7 | Ben Chandler | Democratic | 2004 | Incumbent re-elected. | ▌ ✓ Ben Chandler (Democratic) 85.5%; ▌Paul Ard (Libertarian) 14.5% |

== Louisiana ==
| District | | Incumbent | | | Results | Candidates |
| District | 2004 CPVI | Representative | Party | First elected | Results | Candidates |
|---|---|---|---|---|---|---|
| Louisiana 1 | R+18 | Bobby Jindal | Republican | 2004 | Incumbent re-elected. | ▌ ✓ Bobby Jindal (Republican) 88.1%; ▌David Gereighty (Democratic) 7.4%; ▌Stacey Tallitsch (Democratic) 3.4%; ▌Peter Beary (Libertarian) 1.1% |
| Louisiana 2 | D+28 | William J. Jefferson | Democratic | 1990 | Incumbent re-elected in runoff. | First round: ▌ William J. Jefferson (Democratic) 30.1%; ▌ Karen Carter (Democratic) 21.7%; ▌Derrick Shepherd (Democratic) 17.9%; ▌Joe Lavigne (Republican) 13.3%; ▌Troy Carter (Democratic) 12.0%; ▌Eric Bradley (Republican) 1.2%; ▌Regina Bartholomew (Democratic) 1.2%; ▌John Edwards (Democratic) 0.7%; ▌Scott Barron (Democratic) 0.7%; ▌Rhumbline Kahn (Libertarian) 0.4%; ▌Vinnie Mendoza (Democratic) 0.4%; ▌Lance von Udhe (Republican) 0.3%; ▌D. C. Collins (Democratic) 0.1%; Runoff: ▌ ✓ William J. Jefferson (Democratic) 56.6%; ▌Karen Carter (Democratic) 43.4% |
| Louisiana 3 | R+5 | Charlie Melançon | Democratic | 2004 | Incumbent re-elected. | ▌ ✓ Charlie Melançon (Democratic) 55.0%; ▌Craig Romero (Republican) 40.3%; ▌Olangee Breech (Democratic) 3.1%; ▌James Lee Blake (Libertarian) 1.6% |
| Louisiana 4 | R+7 | Jim McCrery | Republican | 1988 | Incumbent re-elected. | ▌ ✓ Jim McCrery (Republican) 57.4%; ▌Artis Cash (Democratic) 16.9%; ▌Patti Cox (Democratic) 13.2%; ▌Chester Kelley (Republican) 12.4% |
| Louisiana 5 | R+10 | Rodney Alexander | Republican | 2002 (Note: Alexander was first elected as a Democrat. He became a Republican in August 2004.) | Incumbent re-elected. | ▌ ✓ Rodney Alexander (Republican) 68.3%; ▌Gloria Williams Hearn (Democratic) 29.0%; ▌Brent Sanders (Libertarian) 1.6%; ▌John Watts (Independent) 1.1% |
| Louisiana 6 | R+7 | Richard Baker | Republican | 1986 | Incumbent re-elected. | ▌ ✓ Richard Baker (Republican) 82.8%; ▌Richard Fontanesi (Libertarian) 17.2% |
| Louisiana 7 | R+7 | Charles Boustany | Republican | 2004 | Incumbent re-elected. | ▌ ✓ Charles Boustany (Republican) 70.7%; ▌Mike Stagg (Democratic) 29.3% |

== Maine ==
| District | | Incumbent | | | Results | Candidates |
| District | 2004 CPVI | Representative | Party | First elected | Results | Candidates |
|---|---|---|---|---|---|---|
| Maine 1 | D+6 | Tom Allen | Democratic | 1996 | Incumbent re-elected. | ▌ ✓ Tom Allen (Democratic) 60.8%; ▌Darlene Curley (Republican) 31.3%; ▌Dexter Kamilewicz (Independent) 7.9% |
| Maine 2 | D+4 | Mike Michaud | Democratic | 2002 | Incumbent re-elected. | ▌ ✓ Mike Michaud (Democratic) 70.5%; ▌Scott D'Amboise (Republican) 29.5% |

== Maryland ==
| District | | Incumbent | | | Results | Candidates |
| District | 2004 CPVI | Representative | Party | First elected | Results | Candidates |
|---|---|---|---|---|---|---|
| Maryland 1 | R+10 | Wayne Gilchrest | Republican | 1990 | Incumbent re-elected. | ▌ ✓ Wayne Gilchrest (Republican) 68.8%; ▌Jim Corwin (Democratic) 31.1% |
| Maryland 2 | D+8 | Dutch Ruppersberger | Democratic | 2002 | Incumbent re-elected. | ▌ ✓ Dutch Ruppersberger (Democratic) 69.2%; ▌Jimmy Mathis (Republican) 30.7% |
| Maryland 3 | D+7 | Ben Cardin | Democratic | 1986 | Incumbent retired to run for U.S. Senator. Democratic hold. | ▌ ✓ John Sarbanes (Democratic) 64.0%; ▌John White (Republican) 33.8%; ▌Charles Curtis McPeek (Libertarian) 2.1% |
| Maryland 4 | D+30 | Albert Wynn | Democratic | 1992 | Incumbent re-elected. | ▌ ✓ Albert Wynn (Democratic) 80.7%; ▌Moshe Starkman (Republican) 18.6% |
| Maryland 5 | D+9 | Steny Hoyer | Democratic | 1981 | Incumbent re-elected. | ▌ ✓ Steny Hoyer (Democratic) 82.7%; ▌Steve Warner (Green) 16.5% |
| Maryland 6 | R+13 | Roscoe Bartlett | Republican | 1992 | Incumbent re-elected. | ▌ ✓ Roscoe Bartlett (Republican) 59.0%; ▌Andrew Duck (Democratic) 38.4%; ▌Bob Kozak (Green) 2.5% |
| Maryland 7 | D+25 | Elijah Cummings | Democratic | 1996 | Incumbent re-elected. | ▌ ✓ Elijah Cummings (Democratic) 98.1% |
| Maryland 8 | D+20 | Chris Van Hollen | Democratic | 2002 | Incumbent re-elected. | ▌ ✓ Chris Van Hollen (Democratic) 76.5%; ▌Jeff Stein (Republican) 21.9%; ▌Gerard Giblin (Green) 1.5% |

== Massachusetts ==
| District | | Incumbent | | | Results | Candidates |
| District | 2004 CPVI | Representative | Party | First elected | Results | Candidates |
|---|---|---|---|---|---|---|
| Massachusetts 1 | D+15 | John Olver | Democratic | 1991 (special) | Incumbent re-elected. | ▌ ✓ John Olver (Democratic) 76.5%; ▌Bill Szych (Independent) 23.5% |
| Massachusetts 2 | D+11 | Richard Neal | Democratic | 1988 | Incumbent re-elected. | ▌ ✓ Richard Neal (Democratic) Uncontested |
| Massachusetts 3 | D+11 | Jim McGovern | Democratic | 1996 | Incumbent re-elected. | ▌ ✓ Jim McGovern (Democratic) Uncontested |
| Massachusetts 4 | D+17 | Barney Frank | Democratic | 1980 | Incumbent re-elected. | ▌ ✓ Barney Frank (Democratic) Uncontested |
| Massachusetts 5 | D+9 | Marty Meehan | Democratic | 1992 | Incumbent re-elected. | ▌ ✓ Marty Meehan (Democratic) Uncontested |
| Massachusetts 6 | D+10 | John F. Tierney | Democratic | 1996 | Incumbent re-elected. | ▌ ✓ John F. Tierney (Democratic) 69.7%; ▌Rick Barton (Republican) 29.3% |
| Massachusetts 7 | D+18 | Ed Markey | Democratic | 1976 | Incumbent re-elected. | ▌ ✓ Ed Markey (Democratic) Uncontested |
| Massachusetts 8 | D+31 | Mike Capuano | Democratic | 1998 | Incumbent re-elected. | ▌ ✓ Mike Capuano (Democratic) 91.0%; ▌Laura Garza (Socialist Workers) 9.0% |
| Massachusetts 9 | D+15 | Stephen F. Lynch | Democratic | 2001 | Incumbent re-elected. | ▌ ✓ Stephen F. Lynch (Democratic) 78.2%; ▌Jack Robinson (Republican) 21.8% |
| Massachusetts 10 | D+8 | Bill Delahunt | Democratic | 1996 | Incumbent re-elected. | ▌ ✓ Bill Delahunt (Democratic) 64.3%; ▌Jeff Beatty (Republican) 29.4%; ▌Peter White (Independent) 6.3% |

== Michigan ==
| District | | Incumbent | | | Results | Candidates |
| District | 2004 CPVI | Representative | Party | First elected | Results | Candidates |
|---|---|---|---|---|---|---|
| Michigan 1 | R+2 | Bart Stupak | Democratic | 1992 | Incumbent re-elected. | ▌ ✓ Bart Stupak (Democratic) 69.4%; ▌Don Hooper (Republican) 28.0%; Others: ▌Joshua Warren (US Taxpayers) 0.9%; ▌David Newland (Green) 0.9%; ▌Ken Proctor (Libertarian) 0.8% |
| Michigan 2 | R+9 | Pete Hoekstra | Republican | 1992 | Incumbent re-elected. | ▌ ✓ Pete Hoekstra (Republican) 66.4%; ▌Kimon Kotos (Democratic) 31.6%; ▌Ronald Graeser (US Taxpayers) 1.0%; ▌Steven Van Til (Libertarian) 1.0% |
| Michigan 3 | R+9 | Vern Ehlers | Republican | 1993 | Incumbent re-elected. | ▌ ✓ Vern Ehlers (Republican) 63.1%; ▌Jim Rinck (Democratic) 34.6%; ▌Jeff Steinport (Libertarian) 1.4%; ▌Rodger Gurk (Green) 0.9% |
| Michigan 4 | R+3 | Dave Camp | Republican | 1990 | Incumbent re-elected. | ▌ ✓ Dave Camp (Republican) 60.6%; ▌Mike Huckleberry (Democratic) 37.9%; Others: ▌John Emerick (US Taxpayers) 0.8%; ▌Allitta Hren (Libertarian) 0.7% |
| Michigan 5 | D+12 | Dale Kildee | Democratic | 1976 | Incumbent re-elected. | ▌ ✓ Dale Kildee (Democratic) 72.9%; ▌Eric Klammer (Republican) 25.2%; ▌Ken Mathenia (Green) 1.0%; ▌Steve Samoranksi (Libertarian) 0.9% |
| Michigan 6 | R+2 | Fred Upton | Republican | 1986 | Incumbent re-elected. | ▌ ✓ Fred Upton (Republican) 60.6%; ▌Kim Clark (Democratic) 37.9%; ▌Kenneth Howe (Libertarian) 1.5% |
| Michigan 7 | R+2 | Joe Schwarz | Republican | 2004 | Incumbent lost renomination. Republican hold. | ▌ ✓ Tim Walberg (Republican) 49.9%; ▌Sharon Renier (Democratic) 46.0%; ▌Robert Hutchinson (Libertarian) 1.5%; ▌David Horn (US Taxpayers) 1.5%; ▌Joe Schwarz (Write-in) 1.1% |
| Michigan 8 | R+2 | Mike Rogers | Republican | 2000 | Incumbent re-elected. | ▌ ✓ Mike Rogers (Republican) 55.3%; ▌Jim Marcinkowski (Democratic) 42.9%; ▌Dick Gach (Libertarian) 1.0%; ▌Aaron Stuttman (Green) 0.8% |
| Michigan 9 | EVEN | Joe Knollenberg | Republican | 1992 | Incumbent re-elected. | ▌ ✓ Joe Knollenberg (Republican) 51.6%; ▌Nancy Skinner (Democratic) 46.2%; ▌Adam Goodman (Libertarian) 1.3%; ▌Matthew Abel (Green) 0.9% |
| Michigan 10 | R+4 | Candice S. Miller | Republican | 2002 | Incumbent re-elected. | ▌ ✓ Candice S. Miller (Republican) 66.2%; ▌Robert Denison (Democratic) 31.3%; ▌Mark Byrne (Libertarian) 1.1%; ▌Candace Caveny (Green) 0.7%; ▌Richard Gualdoni (US Taxpayers) 0.7% |
| Michigan 11 | R+1 | Thad McCotter | Republican | 2002 | Incumbent re-elected. | ▌ ✓ Thad McCotter (Republican) 54.1%; ▌Tony Trupiano (Democratic) 43.0%; ▌John Tatar (Libertarian) 1.6%; ▌Charles Tackett (US Taxpayers) 1.3% |
| Michigan 12 | D+13 | Sander Levin | Democratic | 1982 | Incumbent re-elected. | ▌ ✓ Sander Levin (Democratic) 70.2%; ▌Randell J. Shafer (Republican) 26.1%; ▌Andy Lecureaux (Libertarian) 1.3%; ▌Les Townsend (US Taxpayers) 0.9%; ▌Jerome S. White (Independent) 0.8%; ▌Art Mayatt (Green) 0.7% |
| Michigan 13 | D+32 | Carolyn Cheeks Kilpatrick | Democratic | 1996 | Incumbent re-elected. | ▌ ✓ Carolyn Cheeks Kilpatrick (Democratic) Uncontested |
| Michigan 14 | D+33 | John Conyers | Democratic | 1964 | Incumbent re-elected. | ▌ ✓ John Conyers (Democratic) 85.3%; ▌Chad Miles (Republican) 14.7% |
| Michigan 15 | D+13 | John Dingell | Democratic | 1955 (special) | Incumbent re-elected. | ▌ ✓ John Dingell (Democratic) 87.9%; ▌Aimee Smith (Green) 4.6%; ▌Gregory Stempfle (Libertarian) 4.1%; ▌Robert Czak (US Taxpayers) 3.4% |

== Minnesota ==
| District | | Incumbent | | | Results | Candidates |
| District | 2004 CPVI | Representative | Party | First elected | Results | Candidates |
|---|---|---|---|---|---|---|
| Minnesota 1 | R+1 | Gil Gutknecht | Republican | 1994 | Incumbent lost re-election. DFL gain. | ▌ ✓ Tim Walz (DFL) 52.7%; ▌Gil Gutknecht (Republican) 47.1% |
| Minnesota 2 | R+3 | John Kline | Republican | 2002 | Incumbent re-elected. | ▌ ✓ John Kline (Republican) 56.2%; ▌Coleen Rowley (DFL) 40.0%; ▌Douglas Williams (Independence) 3.7% |
| Minnesota 3 | R+1 | Jim Ramstad | Republican | 1990 | Incumbent re-elected. | ▌ ✓ Jim Ramstad (Republican) 64.9%; ▌Wendy Wilde (DFL) 35.0% |
| Minnesota 4 | D+13 | Betty McCollum | DFL | 2000 | Incumbent re-elected. | ▌ ✓ Betty McCollum (DFL) 69.5%; ▌Obi Sium (Republican) 30.2% |
| Minnesota 5 | D+21 | Martin Olav Sabo | DFL | 1978 | Incumbent retired. New member elected. DFL hold. | ▌ ✓ Keith Ellison (DFL) 55.6%; ▌Alan Fine (Republican) 21.3%; ▌Tammy Lee (Independence) 21.0%; ▌Jay Pond (Green) 2.0% |
| Minnesota 6 | R+5 | Mark Kennedy | Republican | 2000 | Incumbent retired to run for U.S. Senator. New member elected. Republican hold. | ▌ ✓ Michele Bachmann (Republican) 50.1%; ▌Patty Wetterling (DFL) 42.1%; ▌John Binkowski (Independence) 7.8% |
| Minnesota 7 | R+6 | Collin Peterson | DFL | 1990 | Incumbent re-elected. | ▌ ✓ Collin Peterson (DFL) 69.7%; ▌Mike Barrett (Republican) 29.0%; ▌Ken Lucier (Constitution) 1.3% |
| Minnesota 8 | D+4 | Jim Oberstar | DFL | 1974 | Incumbent re-elected. | ▌ ✓ Jim Oberstar (DFL) 63.6%; ▌Rod Grams (Republican) 34.4%; ▌Harry Welty (Unity) 1.9% |

== Mississippi ==
| District | | Incumbent | | | Results | Candidates |
| District | 2004 CPVI | Representative | Party | First elected | Results | Candidates |
|---|---|---|---|---|---|---|
| Mississippi 1 | R+10 | Roger Wicker | Republican | 1994 | Incumbent re-elected. | ▌ ✓ Roger Wicker (Republican) 65.9%; ▌Ken Hurt (Democratic) 34.1% |
| Mississippi 2 | D+10 | Bennie Thompson | Democratic | 1993 | Incumbent re-elected. | ▌ ✓ Bennie Thompson (Democratic) 64.3%; ▌Yvonne Brown (Republican) 35.7% |
| Mississippi 3 | R+13 | Chip Pickering | Republican | 1996 | Incumbent re-elected. | ▌ ✓ Chip Pickering (Republican) 77.7%; ▌Jim Giles (Independent) 16.1%; ▌Lamonica Magee (Reform) 6.2% |
| Mississippi 4 | R+16 | Gene Taylor | Democratic | 1989 | Incumbent re-elected. | ▌ ✓ Gene Taylor (Democratic) 79.8%; ▌Randy McDonnell (Republican) 20.2% |

== Missouri ==
| District | | Incumbent | | | Results | Candidates |
| District | 2004 CPVI | Representative | Party | First elected | Results | Candidates |
|---|---|---|---|---|---|---|
| Missouri 1 | D+26 | Lacy Clay | Democratic | 2000 | Incumbent re-elected. | ▌ ✓ Lacy Clay (Democratic) 72.9%; ▌Mark Byrne (Republican) 24.7%; ▌Robb Cunningham (Libertarian) 2.4% |
| Missouri 2 | R+9 | Todd Akin | Republican | 2000 | Incumbent re-elected. | ▌ ✓ Todd Akin (Republican) 61.3%; ▌George Weber (Democratic) 36.6%; ▌Tamara Millay (Libertarian) 2.1% |
| Missouri 3 | D+8 | Russ Carnahan | Democratic | 2004 | Incumbent re-elected. | ▌ ✓ Russ Carnahan (Democratic) 65.6%; ▌David Bertelsen (Republican) 31.7%; ▌Rob Christophel (Libertarian) 1.9%; ▌David Sladky (Progressive) 0.8% |
| Missouri 4 | R+11 | Ike Skelton | Democratic | 1976 | Incumbent re-elected. | ▌ ✓ Ike Skelton (Democratic) 67.6%; ▌Jim Noland (Republican) 29.4%; ▌Bryce Holthouse (Libertarian) 1.9%; ▌Mel Ivey (Progressive) 1.0% |
| Missouri 5 | D+12 | Emanuel Cleaver | Democratic | 2004 | Incumbent re-elected. | ▌ ✓ Emanuel Cleaver (Democratic) 64.2%; ▌Jacob Turk (Republican) 32.3%; ▌Randy Langkraehr (Libertarian) 3.5% |
| Missouri 6 | R+5 | Sam Graves | Republican | 2000 | Incumbent re-elected. | ▌ ✓ Sam Graves (Republican) 61.6%; ▌Sara Jo Shettles (Democratic) 35.7%; ▌Erik Buck (Libertarian) 1.9%; ▌Shirley Yurkonis (Progressive) 0.7% |
| Missouri 7 | R+14 | Roy Blunt | Republican | 1996 | Incumbent re-elected. | ▌ ✓ Roy Blunt (Republican) 66.7%; ▌Jack Truman (Democratic) 30.1%; ▌Kevin Craig (Libertarian) 3.1% |
| Missouri 8 | R+11 | Jo Ann Emerson | Republican | 1996 | Incumbent re-elected. | ▌ ✓ Jo Ann Emerson (Republican) 71.6%; ▌Veronica Hambacker (Democratic) 26.4%; ▌Branden McCullough (Libertarian) 2.0% |
| Missouri 9 | R+7 | Kenny Hulshof | Republican | 1996 | Incumbent re-elected. | ▌ ✓ Kenny Hulshof (Republican) 61.4%; ▌Duane Burghard (Democratic) 35.9%; ▌Steven Hedrick (Libertarian) 1.6%; ▌Bill Hastings (Progressive) 1.0% |

== Montana ==
| District | | Incumbent | | | Results | Candidates |
| District | 2004 CPVI | Representative | Party | First elected | Results | Candidates |
|---|---|---|---|---|---|---|
| Montana at-large | R+11 | Denny Rehberg | Republican | 2000 | Incumbent re-elected. | ▌ ✓ Denny Rehberg (Republican) 59.0%; ▌Monica Lindeen (Democratic) 39.1%; ▌Mike Fellows (Libertarian) 1.9% |

== Nebraska ==
| District | | Incumbent | | | Results | Candidates |
| District | 2004 CPVI | Representative | Party | First elected | Results | Candidates |
|---|---|---|---|---|---|---|
| Nebraska 1 | R+11 | Jeff Fortenberry | Republican | 2004 | Incumbent re-elected. | ▌ ✓ Jeff Fortenberry (Republican) 58.4%; ▌Maxine Moul (Democratic) 41.6% |
| Nebraska 2 | R+9 | Lee Terry | Republican | 1998 | Incumbent re-elected. | ▌ ✓ Lee Terry (Republican) 54.7%; ▌Jim Esch (Democratic) 45.3% |
| Nebraska 3 | R+24 | Tom Osborne | Republican | 2000 | Incumbent retired to run for Governor. Republican hold. | ▌ ✓ Adrian Smith (Republican) 55.0%; ▌Scott Kleeb (Democratic) 45.0% |

== Nevada ==
| District | | Incumbent | | | Results | Candidates |
| District | 2004 CPVI | Representative | Party | First elected | Results | Candidates |
|---|---|---|---|---|---|---|
| Nevada 1 | D+9 | Shelley Berkley | Democratic | 1998 | Incumbent re-elected. | ▌ ✓ Shelley Berkley (Democratic) 64.8%; ▌Kenneth Wegner (Republican) 31.2%; ▌Jim Duensing (Libertarian) 2.2%; ▌Darnell Roberts (Independent American) 1.8% |
| Nevada 2 | R+8 | Jim Gibbons | Republican | 1996 | Incumbent retired to run for Governor. Republican hold. | ▌ ✓ Dean Heller (Republican) 50.4%; ▌Jill Derby (Democratic) 44.9%; ▌Daniel Rosen (Independent) 2.4%; ▌James Kroshus (Independent American) 2.3% |
| Nevada 3 | D+1 | Jon Porter | Republican | 2002 | Incumbent re-elected. | ▌ ✓ Jon Porter (Republican) 48.5%; ▌Tessa Hafen (Democratic) 46.6%; ▌Joshua Hansen (Independent American) 2.5%; ▌Joseph Silvestri (Libertarian) 2.4% |

== New Hampshire ==
| District | | Incumbent | | | Results | Candidates |
| District | 2004 CPVI | Representative | Party | First elected | Results | Candidates |
|---|---|---|---|---|---|---|
| New Hampshire 1 | EVEN | Jeb Bradley | Republican | 2002 | Incumbent lost re-election. Democratic gain. | ▌ ✓ Carol Shea-Porter (Democratic) 51.3%; ▌Jeb Bradley (Republican) 48.7% |
| New Hampshire 2 | D+3 | Charles Bass | Republican | 1994 | Incumbent lost re-election. Democratic gain. | ▌ ✓ Paul Hodes (Democratic) 52.7%; ▌Charles Bass (Republican) 45.6%; ▌Ken Blevens (Libertarian) 1.6% |

== New Jersey ==
| District | | Incumbent | | | Results | Candidates |
| District | 2004 CPVI | Representative | Party | First elected | Results | Candidates |
|---|---|---|---|---|---|---|
| New Jersey 1 | D+14 | Rob Andrews | Democratic | 1990 | Incumbent re-elected. | ▌ ✓ Rob Andrews (Democratic) 100% |
| New Jersey 2 | D+4 | Frank LoBiondo | Republican | 1994 | Incumbent re-elected. | ▌ ✓ Frank LoBiondo (Republican) 61.6%; ▌Viola Thomas-Hughes (Democratic) 35.6%; ▌Robert Mullock (Independent) 1.7%; ▌Lynn Merle (Independent) 0.5%; ▌Thomas Fanslau (Independent) 0.3%; ▌Willie Norwood (Socialist) 0.2% |
| New Jersey 3 | D+3 | Jim Saxton | Republican | 1984 | Incumbent re-elected. | ▌ ✓ Jim Saxton (Republican) 58.4%; ▌Rich Sexton (Democratic) 41.0%; ▌Ken Feduniewicz (Independent) 0.6% |
| New Jersey 4 | R+1 | Chris Smith | Republican | 1980 | Incumbent re-elected. | ▌ ✓ Chris Smith (Republican) 65.7%; ▌Carol Gay (Democratic) 33.2%; ▌Jay Edgar (Libertarian) 0.8%; ▌Louis Wary (Independent) 0.3% |
| New Jersey 5 | R+4 | Scott Garrett | Republican | 2002 | Incumbent re-elected. | ▌ ✓ Scott Garrett (Republican) 54.9%; ▌Paul Aronsohn (Democratic) 43.8%; ▌Matthew Fretz (Independent) 1.3% |
| New Jersey 6 | D+12 | Frank Pallone | Democratic | 1988 | Incumbent re-elected. | ▌ ✓ Frank Pallone (Democratic) 68.6%; ▌Leigh-Ann Bellew (Republican) 30.3%; ▌Herbert Tarbous (Independent) 1.1% |
| New Jersey 7 | R+1 | Mike Ferguson | Republican | 2000 | Incumbent re-elected. | ▌ ✓ Mike Ferguson (Republican) 49.4%; ▌Linda Stender (Democratic) 47.9%; ▌Thomas Abrams (Independent) 1.6%; ▌Darren Young (Libertarian) 1.0% |
| New Jersey 8 | D+12 | Bill Pascrell | Democratic | 1996 | Incumbent re-elected. | ▌ ✓ Bill Pascrell (Democratic) 70.9%; ▌Jose Sandoval (Republican) 28.4%; ▌Lou Jasikoff (Libertarian) 0.7% |
| New Jersey 9 | D+13 | Steve Rothman | Democratic | 1996 | Incumbent re-elected. | ▌ ✓ Steve Rothman (Democratic) 71.5%; ▌Vincent Micco (Republican) 27.6%; ▌Michael Jarvis (Independent) 0.9% |
| New Jersey 10 | D+34 | Donald M. Payne | Democratic | 1988 | Incumbent re-elected. | ▌ ✓ Donald M. Payne (Democratic) 100% |
| New Jersey 11 | R+6 | Rodney Frelinghuysen | Republican | 1994 | Incumbent re-elected. | ▌ ✓ Rodney Frelinghuysen (Republican) 62.1%; ▌Tom Wyka (Democratic) 36.6%; Others: ▌Richard Roth (Libertarian) 0.9%; ▌John Mele (Constitution) 0.4% |
| New Jersey 12 | D+8 | Rush Holt Jr. | Democratic | 1998 | Incumbent re-elected. | ▌ ✓ Rush Holt Jr. (Democratic) 65.7%; ▌Joseph Sinagra (Republican) 34.3% |
| New Jersey 13 | D+23 | Vacant | | | Bob Menendez (D) resigned January 16, 2006 after being appointed to the U.S. Senate. Democratic hold. | ▌ ✓ Albio Sires (Democratic) 77.5%; ▌John Guarini (Republican) 19.4%; ▌Brian Williams (Socialist Workers) 1.0%; ▌Herbert Shaw (Independent) 1.0%; ▌Dick Hester (Independent) 0.6%; ▌Esmat Zaklama (Independent) 0.5% |

== New Mexico ==
| District | | Incumbent | | | Results | Candidates |
| District | 2004 CPVI | Representative | Party | First elected | Results | Candidates |
|---|---|---|---|---|---|---|
| New Mexico 1 | D+2 | Heather Wilson | Republican | 1998 | Incumbent re-elected. | ▌ ✓ Heather Wilson (Republican) 50.2%; ▌Patricia Madrid (Democratic) 49.8% |
| New Mexico 2 | R+6 | Steve Pearce | Republican | 2002 | Incumbent re-elected. | ▌ ✓ Steve Pearce (Republican) 59.4%; ▌Albert Kissling (Democratic) 40.5% |
| New Mexico 3 | D+6 | Tom Udall | Democratic | 1998 | Incumbent re-elected. | ▌ ✓ Tom Udall (Democratic) 74.6%; ▌Ron Dolin (Republican) 25.4% |

== New York ==
| District | | Incumbent | | | Results | Candidates |
| District | 2004 CPVI | Representative | Party | First elected | Results | Candidates |
|---|---|---|---|---|---|---|
| New York 1 | D+3 | Tim Bishop | Democratic | 2002 | Incumbent re-elected. | ▌ ✓ Tim Bishop (Democratic) 62.2%; ▌Italo Zanzi (Republican) 37.8% |
| New York 2 | D+7 | Steve Israel | Democratic | 2000 | Incumbent re-elected. | ▌ ✓ Steve Israel (Democratic) 70.4%; ▌Josh Price (Republican) 29.6% |
| New York 3 | D+2 | Peter T. King | Republican | 1992 | Incumbent re-elected. | ▌ ✓ Peter T. King (Republican) 56.0%; ▌David Mejias (Democratic) 44.0% |
| New York 4 | D+9 | Carolyn McCarthy | Democratic | 1996 | Incumbent re-elected. | ▌ ✓ Carolyn McCarthy (Democratic) 64.9%; ▌Martin Blessinger (Republican) 35.1% |
| New York 5 | D+18 | Gary Ackerman | Democratic | 1983 (special) | Incumbent re-elected. | ▌ ✓ Gary Ackerman (Democratic) Uncontested |
| New York 6 | D+38 | Gregory Meeks | Democratic | 1998 | Incumbent re-elected. | ▌ ✓ Gregory Meeks (Democratic) Uncontested |
| New York 7 | D+28 | Joseph Crowley | Democratic | 1998 | Incumbent re-elected. | ▌ ✓ Joseph Crowley (Democratic) 84.0%; ▌Kevin Brawley (Republican) 16.0% |
| New York 8 | D+28 | Jerrold Nadler | Democratic | 1992 | Incumbent re-elected. | ▌ ✓ Jerrold Nadler (Democratic) 85.0%; ▌Eleanor Friedman (Republican) 13.6%; ▌Dennis Adornato (Conservative) 1.4% |
| New York 9 | D+14 | Anthony Weiner | Democratic | 1998 | Incumbent re-elected. | ▌ ✓ Anthony Weiner (Democratic) Uncontested |
| New York 10 | D+41 | Edolphus Towns | Democratic | 1982 | Incumbent re-elected. | ▌ ✓ Edolphus Towns (Democratic) 92.2%; ▌Jonathan Anderson (Republican) 5.9%; ▌Ernest Johnson (Conservative) 1.9% |
| New York 11 | D+40 | Major Owens | Democratic | 1982 | Incumbent retired. Democratic hold. | ▌ ✓ Yvette Clarke (Democratic) 90.0%; ▌Stephen Finger (Republican) 7.6%; ▌Mariana Blume (Conservative) 1.4%; ▌Ollie McClean (Freedom) 1.0% |
| New York 12 | D+34 | Nydia Velázquez | Democratic | 1992 | Incumbent re-elected. | ▌ ✓ Nydia Velázquez (Democratic) 89.7%; ▌Allan Romaguera (Republican) 10.3% |
| New York 13 | D+1 | Vito Fossella | Republican | 1997 (special) | Incumbent re-elected. | ▌ ✓ Vito Fossella (Republican) 56.8%; ▌Steve Harrison (Democratic) 43.2% |
| New York 14 | D+26 | Carolyn Maloney | Democratic | 1992 | Incumbent re-elected. | ▌ ✓ Carolyn Maloney (Democratic) 84.5%; ▌Danniel S. Maio (Republican) 15.5% |
| New York 15 | D+43 | Charles B. Rangel | Democratic | 1970 | Incumbent re-elected. | ▌ ✓ Charles B. Rangel (Democratic) 94.0%; ▌Edward Daniels (Republican) 6.0% |
| New York 16 | D+43 | José E. Serrano | Democratic | 1990 | Incumbent re-elected. | ▌ ✓ José E. Serrano (Democratic) 95.3%; ▌Ali Mohamed (Republican) 4.7% |
| New York 17 | D+21 | Eliot Engel | Democratic | 1988 | Incumbent re-elected. | ▌ ✓ Eliot Engel (Democratic) 76.4%; ▌Jim Faulkner (Republican) 23.6% |
| New York 18 | D+10 | Nita Lowey | Democratic | 1988 | Incumbent re-elected. | ▌ ✓ Nita Lowey (Democratic) 70.7%; ▌Richard A. Hoffman (Republican) 29.3% |
| New York 19 | R+1 | Sue W. Kelly | Republican | 1994 | Incumbent lost re-election. Democratic gain. | ▌ ✓ John J. Hall (Democratic) 51.2%; ▌Sue W. Kelly (Republican) 48.8% |
| New York 20 | R+3 | John E. Sweeney | Republican | 1998 | Incumbent lost re-election. Democratic gain. | ▌ ✓ Kirsten Gillibrand (Democratic) 53.1%; ▌John E. Sweeney (Republican) 46.9% |
| New York 21 | D+9 | Michael R. McNulty | Democratic | 1988 | Incumbent re-elected. | ▌ ✓ Michael R. McNulty (Democratic) 78.2%; ▌Warren Redlich (Republican) 21.8% |
| New York 22 | D+6 | Maurice Hinchey | Democratic | 1992 | Incumbent re-elected. | ▌ ✓ Maurice Hinchey (Democratic) Uncontested |
| New York 23 | EVEN | John M. McHugh | Republican | 1992 | Incumbent re-elected. | ▌ ✓ John M. McHugh (Republican) 63.1%; ▌Robert J. Johnson (Democratic) 36.9% |
| New York 24 | R+1 | Sherwood Boehlert | Republican | 1982 | Incumbent retired. Democratic gain. | ▌ ✓ Mike Arcuri (Democratic) 53.9%; ▌Ray Meier (Republican) 45.0%; ▌Mike Sylvia (Libertarian) 1.1% |
| New York 25 | D+3 | James T. Walsh | Republican | 1988 | Incumbent re-elected. | ▌ ✓ James T. Walsh (Republican) 50.8%; ▌Dan Maffei (Democratic) 49.2% |
| New York 26 | R+3 | Thomas M. Reynolds | Republican | 1998 | Incumbent re-elected. | ▌ ✓ Thomas M. Reynolds (Republican) 52.0%; ▌Jack Davis (Democratic) 48.0% |
| New York 27 | D+7 | Brian Higgins | Democratic | 2004 | Incumbent re-elected. | ▌ ✓ Brian Higgins (Democratic) 79.3%; ▌Michael McHale (Republican) 20.7% |
| New York 28 | D+15 | Louise Slaughter | Democratic | 1986 | Incumbent re-elected. | ▌ ✓ Louise Slaughter (Democratic) 73.2%; ▌John Donnelly (Republican) 26.8% |
| New York 29 | R+5 | Randy Kuhl | Republican | 2004 | Incumbent re-elected. | ▌ ✓ Randy Kuhl (Republican) 51.5%; ▌Eric Massa (Democratic) 48.5% |

== North Carolina ==
| District | | Incumbent | | | Results | Candidates |
| District | 2004 CPVI | Representative | Party | First elected | Results | Candidates |
|---|---|---|---|---|---|---|
| North Carolina 1 | D+9 | G. K. Butterfield | Democratic | 2004 | Incumbent re-elected. | ▌ ✓ G. K. Butterfield (Democratic) 100% |
| North Carolina 2 | R+3 | Bob Etheridge | Democratic | 1996 | Incumbent re-elected. | ▌ ✓ Bob Etheridge (Democratic) 66.5%; ▌Dan Mansell (Republican) 33.5% |
| North Carolina 3 | R+15 | Walter B. Jones Jr. | Republican | 1994 | Incumbent re-elected. | ▌ ✓ Walter B. Jones Jr. (Republican) 68.6%; ▌Craig Weber (Democratic) 31.4% |
| North Carolina 4 | D+6 | David Price | Democratic | 1986; 1994 (defeated); 1996 | Incumbent re-elected. | ▌ ✓ David Price (Democratic) 65.0%; ▌Steven Acuff (Republican) 35.0% |
| North Carolina 5 | R+15 | Virginia Foxx | Republican | 2004 | Incumbent re-elected. | ▌ ✓ Virginia Foxx (Republican) 57.2%; ▌Roger Sharpe (Democratic) 42.8% |
| North Carolina 6 | R+17 | Howard Coble | Republican | 1984 | Incumbent re-elected. | ▌ ✓ Howard Coble (Republican) 70.8%; ▌Rory Blake (Democratic) 29.2% |
| North Carolina 7 | R+3 | Mike McIntyre | Democratic | 1996 | Incumbent re-elected. | ▌ ✓ Mike McIntyre (Democratic) 72.8%; ▌Shirley Davis (Republican) 27.2% |
| North Carolina 8 | R+3 | Robin Hayes | Republican | 1998 | Incumbent re-elected. | ▌ ✓ Robin Hayes (Republican) 50.1%; ▌Larry Kissell (Democratic) 49.9% |
| North Carolina 9 | R+12 | Sue Myrick | Republican | 1994 | Incumbent re-elected. | ▌ ✓ Sue Myrick (Republican) 66.5%; ▌Bill Glass (Democratic) 33.5% |
| North Carolina 10 | R+15 | Patrick McHenry | Republican | 2004 | Incumbent re-elected. | ▌ ✓ Patrick McHenry (Republican) 61.8%; ▌Richard Carsner (Democratic) 38.2% |
| North Carolina 11 | R+7 | Charles Taylor | Republican | 1990 | Incumbent lost re-election. Democratic gain. | ▌ ✓ Heath Shuler (Democratic) 53.8%; ▌Charles Taylor (Republican) 46.2% |
| North Carolina 12 | D+11 | Mel Watt | Democratic | 1992 | Incumbent re-elected. | ▌ ✓ Mel Watt (Democratic) 67.0%; ▌Ada Fisher (Republican) 33.0% |
| North Carolina 13 | D+2 | Brad Miller | Democratic | 2002 | Incumbent re-elected. | ▌ ✓ Brad Miller (Democratic) 63.7%; ▌Vernon Robinson (Republican) 36.3% |

== North Dakota ==
| District | | Incumbent | | | Results | Candidates |
| District | 2004 CPVI | Representative | Party | First elected | Results | Candidates |
|---|---|---|---|---|---|---|
| North Dakota at-large | R+13 | Earl Pomeroy | Democratic-NPL | 1992 | Incumbent re-elected. | ▌ ✓ Earl Pomeroy (Democratic-NPL) 65.7%; ▌Matthew Mechtel (Republican) 34.3% |

== Ohio ==
| District | | Incumbent | | | Results | Candidates |
| District | 2004 CPVI | Representative | Party | First elected | Results | Candidates |
|---|---|---|---|---|---|---|
| Ohio 1 | R+1 | Steve Chabot | Republican | 1994 | Incumbent re-elected. | ▌ ✓ Steve Chabot (Republican) 52.3%; ▌John Cranley (Democratic) 47.7% |
| Ohio 2 | R+13 | Jean Schmidt | Republican | 2005 (special) | Incumbent re-elected. | ▌ ✓ Jean Schmidt (Republican) 50.5%; ▌Victoria Wulsin (Democratic) 49.4% |
| Ohio 3 | R+3 | Mike Turner | Republican | 2002 | Incumbent re-elected. | ▌ ✓ Mike Turner (Republican) 58.5%; ▌Richard Chema (Democratic) 41.5% |
| Ohio 4 | R+14 | Mike Oxley | Republican | 1981 (special) | Incumbent retired. Republican hold. | ▌ ✓ Jim Jordan (Republican) 60.0%; ▌Richard Siferd (Democratic) 40.0% |
| Ohio 5 | R+10 | Paul Gillmor | Republican | 1988 | Incumbent re-elected. | ▌ ✓ Paul Gillmor (Republican) 56.9%; ▌Robin Weirauch (Democratic) 43.1% |
| Ohio 6 | EVEN | Ted Strickland | Democratic | 1992; 1994 (defeated); 1996 | Incumbent retired to run for Governor. Democratic hold. | ▌ ✓ Charlie Wilson (Democratic) 62.1%; ▌Chuck Blasdel (Republican) 37.9% |
| Ohio 7 | R+6 | Dave Hobson | Republican | 1990 | Incumbent re-elected. | ▌ ✓ Dave Hobson (Republican) 60.6%; ▌Bill Conner (Democratic) 39.4% |
| Ohio 8 | R+12 | John Boehner | Republican | 1990 | Incumbent re-elected. | ▌ ✓ John Boehner (Republican) 63.8%; ▌Mort Meier (Democratic) 36.2% |
| Ohio 9 | D+9 | Marcy Kaptur | Democratic | 1982 | Incumbent re-elected. | ▌ ✓ Marcy Kaptur (Democratic) 73.6%; ▌Bradley Leavitt (Republican) 26.4% |
| Ohio 10 | D+6 | Dennis Kucinich | Democratic | 1996 | Incumbent re-elected. | ▌ ✓ Dennis Kucinich (Democratic) 66.4%; ▌Mike Dovilla (Republican) 33.6% |
| Ohio 11 | D+33 | Stephanie Tubbs Jones | Democratic | 1998 | Incumbent re-elected. | ▌ ✓ Stephanie Tubbs Jones (Democratic) 83.4%; ▌Lindsey String (Republican) 16.6% |
| Ohio 12 | R+1 | Pat Tiberi | Republican | 2000 | Incumbent re-elected. | ▌ ✓ Pat Tiberi (Republican) 57.3%; ▌Bob Shamansky (Democratic) 42.7% |
| Ohio 13 | D+6 | Sherrod Brown | Democratic | 1992 | Incumbent retired to run for U.S. Senator. Democratic hold. | ▌ ✓ Betty Sutton (Democratic) 61.2%; ▌Craig Foltin (Republican) 38.8% |
| Ohio 14 | R+2 | Steve LaTourette | Republican | 1994 | Incumbent re-elected. | ▌ ✓ Steve LaTourette (Republican) 57.6%; ▌Lewis Katz (Democratic) 39.0%; ▌Werner Lange (Independent) 3.4% |
| Ohio 15 | R+1 | Deborah Pryce | Republican | 1992 | Incumbent re-elected. | ▌ ✓ Deborah Pryce (Republican) 50.2%; ▌Mary Jo Kilroy (Democratic) 49.7% |
| Ohio 16 | R+4 | Ralph Regula | Republican | 1972 | Incumbent re-elected. | ▌ ✓ Ralph Regula (Republican) 58.3%; ▌Tom Shaw (Democratic) 41.7% |
| Ohio 17 | D+14 | Tim Ryan | Democratic | 2002 | Incumbent re-elected. | ▌ ✓ Tim Ryan (Democratic) 80.3%; ▌Don Manning III (Republican) 19.7% |
| Ohio 18 | R+6 | Vacant | | | Rep. Bob Ney (R) resigned November 3, 2006. Democratic gain. | ▌ ✓ Zack Space (Democratic) 62.1%; ▌Joy Padgett (Republican) 37.9% |

== Oklahoma ==
| District | | Incumbent | | | Results | Candidates |
| District | 2004 CPVI | Representative | Party | First elected | Results | Candidates |
|---|---|---|---|---|---|---|
| Oklahoma 1 | R+13 | John Sullivan | Republican | 2002 | Incumbent re-elected. | ▌ ✓ John Sullivan (Republican) 63.6%; ▌Alan Gentges (Democratic) 30.9%; ▌Bill Wortman (Independent) 5.5% |
| Oklahoma 2 | R+5 | Dan Boren | Democratic | 2004 | Incumbent re-elected. | ▌ ✓ Dan Boren (Democratic) 72.7%; ▌Patrick Miller (Republican) 27.3% |
| Oklahoma 3 | R+18 | Frank Lucas | Republican | 1994 | Incumbent re-elected. | ▌ ✓ Frank Lucas (Republican) 67.5%; ▌Susan Barton (Democratic) 32.5% |
| Oklahoma 4 | R+13 | Tom Cole | Republican | 2002 | Incumbent re-elected. | ▌ ✓ Tom Cole (Republican) 64.6%; ▌Hal Spake (Democratic) 35.4% |
| Oklahoma 5 | R+12 | Ernest Istook | Republican | 1992 | Incumbent retired to run for Governor. Republican hold. | ▌ ✓ Mary Fallin (Republican) 60.4%; ▌David Hunter (Democratic) 37.3%; ▌Matthew Woodson (Independent) 2.3% |

== Oregon ==
| District | | Incumbent | | | Results | Candidates |
| District | 2004 CPVI | Representative | Party | First elected | Results | Candidates |
|---|---|---|---|---|---|---|
| Oregon 1 | D+6 | David Wu | Democratic | 1998 | Incumbent re-elected. | ▌ ✓ David Wu (Democratic) 62.8%; ▌Derrick Kitts (Republican) 33.7%; ▌Drake Davis (Libertarian) 1.7%; ▌Dean Wolf (Constitution) 1.6% |
| Oregon 2 | R+11 | Greg Walden | Republican | 1998 | Incumbent re-elected. | ▌ ✓ Greg Walden (Republican) 66.8%; ▌Carol Voisin (Democratic) 30.4%; ▌Jack Brown (Constitution) 2.6% |
| Oregon 3 | D+18 | Earl Blumenauer | Democratic | 1996 | Incumbent re-elected. | ▌ ✓ Earl Blumenauer (Democratic) 73.5%; ▌Bruce Broussard (Republican) 23.5%; ▌David Brownlow (Constitution) 2.8% |
| Oregon 4 | EVEN | Peter DeFazio | Democratic | 1986 | Incumbent re-elected. | ▌ ✓ Peter DeFazio (Democratic) 62.3%; ▌Jim Feldkamp (Republican) 37.6% |
| Oregon 5 | D+1 | Darlene Hooley | Democratic | 1996 | Incumbent re-elected. | ▌ ✓ Darlene Hooley (Democratic) 54.0%; ▌Mike Erickson (Republican) 42.8%; ▌Paul Aranas (Pacific Green) 1.5%; ▌Doug Patterson (Constitution) 1.5% |

== Pennsylvania ==
| District | | Incumbent | | | Results | Candidates |
| District | 2004 CPVI | Representative | Party | First elected | Results | Candidates |
|---|---|---|---|---|---|---|
| Pennsylvania 1 | D+36 | Bob Brady | Democratic | 1998 | Incumbent re-elected. | ▌ ✓ Bob Brady (Democratic) 100% |
| Pennsylvania 2 | D+39 | Chaka Fattah | Democratic | 1994 | Incumbent re-elected. | ▌ ✓ Chaka Fattah (Democratic) 88.6%; ▌Michael Gessner (Republican) 9.2%; ▌Dave Baker (Green) 2.2% |
| Pennsylvania 3 | R+2 | Phil English | Republican | 1994 | Incumbent re-elected. | ▌ ✓ Phil English (Republican) 53.6%; ▌Steven Porter (Democratic) 42.1%; ▌Tim Hagberg (Constitution) 4.3% |
| Pennsylvania 4 | R+3 | Melissa Hart | Republican | 2000 | Incumbent lost re-election. Democratic gain. | ▌ ✓ Jason Altmire (Democratic) 51.9%; ▌Melissa Hart (Republican) 48.1% |
| Pennsylvania 5 | R+10 | John E. Peterson | Republican | 1996 | Incumbent re-elected. | ▌ ✓ John E. Peterson (Republican) 60.1%; ▌Don Hilliard (Democratic) 39.9% |
| Pennsylvania 6 | D+2 | Jim Gerlach | Republican | 2002 | Incumbent re-elected. | ▌ ✓ Jim Gerlach (Republican) 50.7%; ▌Lois Murphy (Democratic) 49.3% |
| Pennsylvania 7 | D+4 | Curt Weldon | Republican | 1986 | Incumbent lost re-election. Democratic gain. | ▌ ✓ Joe Sestak (Democratic) 56.4%; ▌Curt Weldon (Republican) 43.6% |
| Pennsylvania 8 | D+3 | Mike Fitzpatrick | Republican | 2004 | Incumbent lost re-election. Democratic gain. | ▌ ✓ Patrick Murphy (Democratic) 50.3%; ▌Mike Fitzpatrick (Republican) 49.7% |
| Pennsylvania 9 | R+15 | Bill Shuster | Republican | 2001 (special) | Incumbent re-elected. | ▌ ✓ Bill Shuster (Republican) 60.3%; ▌Tony Barr (Democratic) 39.7% |
| Pennsylvania 10 | R+8 | Don Sherwood | Republican | 1998 | Incumbent lost re-election. Democratic gain. | ▌ ✓ Chris Carney (Democratic) 52.9%; ▌Don Sherwood (Republican) 47.1% |
| Pennsylvania 11 | D+5 | Paul Kanjorski | Democratic | 1984 | Incumbent re-elected. | ▌ ✓ Paul Kanjorski (Democratic) 72.5%; ▌Joseph Leonardi (Republican) 27.5% |
| Pennsylvania 12 | D+5 | John Murtha | Democratic | 1974 | Incumbent re-elected. | ▌ ✓ John Murtha (Democratic) 60.8%; ▌Diana Irey (Republican) 39.2% |
| Pennsylvania 13 | D+8 | Allyson Schwartz | Democratic | 2004 | Incumbent re-elected. | ▌ ✓ Allyson Schwartz (Democratic) 66.1%; ▌Raj Bhakta (Republican) 33.9% |
| Pennsylvania 14 | D+22 | Michael F. Doyle | Democratic | 1994 | Incumbent re-elected. | ▌ ✓ Michael F. Doyle (Democratic) 90.1%; ▌Titus North (Green) 9.9% |
| Pennsylvania 15 | D+2 | Charlie Dent | Republican | 2004 | Incumbent re-elected. | ▌ ✓ Charlie Dent (Republican) 53.6%; ▌Charles Dertinger (Democratic) 43.5%; ▌Greta Browne (Green) 2.9% |
| Pennsylvania 16 | R+11 | Joe Pitts | Republican | 1996 | Incumbent re-elected. | ▌ ✓ Joe Pitts (Republican) 56.6%; ▌Lois Herr (Democratic) 39.5%; ▌John Murphy (Independent) 3.9% |
| Pennsylvania 17 | R+7 | Tim Holden | Democratic | 1992 | Incumbent re-elected. | ▌ ✓ Tim Holden (Democratic) 64.5%; ▌Matthew Wertz (Republican) 35.5% |
| Pennsylvania 18 | R+2 | Tim Murphy | Republican | 2002 | Incumbent re-elected. | ▌ ✓ Tim Murphy (Republican) 57.8%; ▌Chad Kluko (Democratic) 42.2% |
| Pennsylvania 19 | R+12 | Todd Platts | Republican | 2000 | Incumbent re-elected. | ▌ ✓ Todd Platts (Republican) 64.0%; ▌Phil Avillo (Democratic) 33.5%; ▌Derf Maitland (Green) 2.5% |

== Rhode Island ==
| District | | Incumbent | | | Results | Candidates |
| District | 2004 CPVI | Representative | Party | First elected | Results | Candidates |
|---|---|---|---|---|---|---|
| Rhode Island 1 | D+16 | Patrick J. Kennedy | Democratic | 1994 | Incumbent re-elected. | ▌ ✓ Patrick J. Kennedy (Democratic) 69.2%; ▌Jonathan Scott (Republican) 23.2%; ▌Kenneth Capalbo (Independent) 7.6% |
| Rhode Island 2 | D+13 | Jim Langevin | Democratic | 2000 | Incumbent re-elected. | ▌ ✓ Jim Langevin (Democratic) 72.7%; ▌Rod Driver (Independent) 27.3% |

== South Carolina ==
| District | | Incumbent | | | Results | Candidates |
| District | 2004 CPVI | Representative | Party | First elected | Results | Candidates |
|---|---|---|---|---|---|---|
| South Carolina 1 | R+10 | Henry Brown | Republican | 2000 | Incumbent re-elected. | ▌ ✓ Henry Brown (Republican) 59.9%; ▌Randy Maatta (Democratic) 37.9%; ▌James Dunn (Green) 2.2% |
| South Carolina 2 | R+9 | Joe Wilson | Republican | 2001 (special) | Incumbent re-elected. | ▌ ✓ Joe Wilson (Republican) 62.6%; ▌Michael Ray Ellisor (Democratic) 37.3% |
| South Carolina 3 | R+14 | Gresham Barrett | Republican | 2002 | Incumbent re-elected. | ▌ ✓ Gresham Barrett (Republican) 62.9%; ▌Lee Ballenger (Democratic) 37.1% |
| South Carolina 4 | R+15 | Bob Inglis | Republican | 1992; 1998 (retired); 2004 | Incumbent re-elected. | ▌ ✓ Bob Inglis (Republican) 64.2%; ▌William Griffith (Democratic) 32.0%; ▌John Cobin (Libertarian) 2.5%; ▌Faye Walters (Green) 1.3% |
| South Carolina 5 | R+6 | John Spratt | Democratic | 1982 | Incumbent re-elected. | ▌ ✓ John Spratt (Democratic) 56.9%; ▌Ralph Norman (Republican) 43.1% |
| South Carolina 6 | D+11 | Jim Clyburn | Democratic | 1992 | Incumbent re-elected. | ▌ ✓ Jim Clyburn (Democratic) 64.4%; ▌Gary McLeod (Republican) 34.2%; ▌Antonio Williams (Green) 1.4% |

== South Dakota ==
| District | | Incumbent | | | Results | Candidates |
| District | 2004 CPVI | Representative | Party | First elected | Results | Candidates |
|---|---|---|---|---|---|---|
| South Dakota at-large | R+10 | Stephanie Herseth | Democratic | 2004 (special) | Incumbent re-elected. | ▌ ✓ Stephanie Herseth (Democratic) 69.1%; ▌Bruce Whalen (Republican) 29.3%; ▌Larry Rudebusch (Libertarian) 1.6% |

== Tennessee ==
| District | | Incumbent | | | Results | Candidates |
| District | 2004 CPVI | Representative | Party | First elected | Results | Candidates |
|---|---|---|---|---|---|---|
| Tennessee 1 | R+14 | Bill Jenkins | Republican | 1996 | Incumbent retired. Republican hold. | ▌ ✓ David Davis (Republican) 61.1%; ▌Rick Trent (Democratic) 36.9%; Others: ▌Bob Smith (Green) 0.6%; ▌James Reeves (Independent) 0.6%; ▌Michael Peavler (Independent) 0.5%; ▌Michael Sabri (Independent) 0.2% |
| Tennessee 2 | R+11 | Jimmy Duncan | Republican | 1998 | Incumbent re-elected. | ▌ ✓ Jimmy Duncan (Republican) 77.7%; ▌John Greene (Democratic) 22.3% |
| Tennessee 3 | R+8 | Zach Wamp | Republican | 1994 | Incumbent re-elected. | ▌ ✓ Zach Wamp (Republican) 65.7%; ▌Brent Benedict (Democratic) 34.3% |
| Tennessee 4 | R+3 | Lincoln Davis | Democratic | 2002 | Incumbent re-elected. | ▌ ✓ Lincoln Davis (Democratic) 67.5%; ▌Kenneth Martin (Republican) 32.5% |
| Tennessee 5 | D+6 | Jim Cooper | Democratic | 1982; 1994 (retired); 2002 | Incumbent re-elected. | ▌ ✓ Jim Cooper (Democratic) 68.9%; ▌Tom Kovach (Republican) 28.0%; ▌Virginia Welsch (Independent) 2.1%; ▌Scott Knapp (Independent) 1.0% |
| Tennessee 6 | R+4 | Bart Gordon | Democratic | 1984 | Incumbent re-elected. | ▌ ✓ Bart Gordon (Democratic) 67.1%; ▌Randy Stamps (Republican) 31.4%; ▌Robert Garrison (Independent) 1.1%; ▌Norman Saliba (Independent) 0.5% |
| Tennessee 7 | R+12 | Marsha Blackburn | Republican | 2002 | Incumbent re-elected. | ▌ ✓ Marsha Blackburn (Republican) 66.0%; ▌Bill Morrison (Democratic) 31.8%; ▌Katey Culver (Green) 0.8%; ▌James White (Independent) 0.4%; ▌William Smith (Independent) 0.4%; ▌John L. Rimer (Independent) 0.3%; ▌Gayl Pratt (Independent) 0.3% |
| Tennessee 8 | EVEN | John Tanner | Democratic | 1988 | Incumbent re-elected. | ▌ ✓ John Tanner (Democratic) 73.2%; ▌John Farmer (Republican) 26.8% |
| Tennessee 9 | D+18 | Harold Ford Jr. | Democratic | 1996 | Incumbent retired to run for U.S. Senator. Democratic hold. | ▌ ✓ Steve Cohen (Democratic) 59.9%; ▌Jake Ford (Independent) 22.2%; ▌Mark White (Republican) 18.0% |

== Texas ==
Texas's 22nd district was held by Tom DeLay who had resigned. The Democratic Party sued to prevent the Republican Party from replacing Tom DeLay (who was determined to be the candidate in March 2006) with another candidate. The courts agreed with the Democratic Party and the Supreme Court has refused to hear the appeal. On August 8, 2006, Tom DeLay officially withdrew his name as the Republican candidate. (The court decision did not allow the Republican Party from changing its candidate, however it did not prevent Tom DeLay from withdrawing altogether.)

Texas's 23rd district was declared unconstitutional by the Supreme Court of the United States, which ordered the district re-drawn. This affected the 15th, 21st, 23rd, 25th, and 28th districts, which had a blanket primary on Election Day, followed by a runoff on December 6 in District 23, where no candidate got a majority of the vote.

| District | | Incumbent | | | Results | Candidates |
| District | 2004 CPVI | Representative | Party | First elected | Results | Candidates |
|---|---|---|---|---|---|---|
| Texas 1 | R+17 | Louie Gohmert | Republican | 2004 | Incumbent re-elected. | ▌ ✓ Louie Gohmert (Republican) 68.0%; ▌Roger Owen (Democratic) 30.3%; ▌Donald Perkison (Libertarian) 1.7% |
| Texas 2 | R+12 | Ted Poe | Republican | 2004 | Incumbent re-elected. | ▌ ✓ Ted Poe (Republican) 65.6%; ▌Gary Binderim (Democratic) 32.7%; ▌Justo Perez (Libertarian) 1.7% |
| Texas 3 | R+17 | Sam Johnson | Republican | 1991 (special) | Incumbent re-elected. | ▌ ✓ Sam Johnson (Republican) 62.5%; ▌Dan Dodd (Democratic) 34.9%; ▌Christopher J. Claytor (Libertarian) 2.6% |
| Texas 4 | R+17 | Ralph Hall | Republican | 1980 (Note: Hall was first elected as a Democrat. He became a Republican in January 2004.) | Incumbent re-elected. | ▌ ✓ Ralph Hall (Republican) 64.4%; ▌Glenn Melancon (Democratic) 33.4%; ▌Kurt Helm (Libertarian) 2.1% |
| Texas 5 | R+16 | Jeb Hensarling | Republican | 2002 | Incumbent re-elected. | ▌ ✓ Jeb Hensarling (Republican) 61.8%; ▌Charlie Thompson (Democratic) 35.6%; ▌Mike Nelson (Libertarian) 2.6% |
| Texas 6 | R+15 | Joe Barton | Republican | 1984 | Incumbent re-elected. | ▌ ✓ Joe Barton (Republican) 60.5%; ▌David Harris (Democratic) 37.1%; ▌Carl Nulsen (Libertarian) 2.4% |
| Texas 7 | R+16 | John Culberson | Republican | 2000 | Incumbent re-elected. | ▌ ✓ John Culberson (Republican) 59.2%; ▌Jim Henley (Democratic) 38.5%; ▌Drew P. Parks (Libertarian) 2.3% |
| Texas 8 | R+20 | Kevin Brady | Republican | 1996 | Incumbent re-elected. | ▌ ✓ Kevin Brady (Republican) 67.3%; ▌James Wright (Democratic) 32.7% |
| Texas 9 | D+21 | Al Green | Democratic | 2004 | Incumbent re-elected. | ▌ ✓ Al Green (Democratic) Uncontested |
| Texas 10 | R+13 | Michael McCaul | Republican | 2004 | Incumbent re-elected. | ▌ ✓ Michael McCaul (Republican) 55.3%; ▌Ted Ankrum (Democratic) 40.4%; ▌Michael Badnarik (Libertarian) 4.3% |
| Texas 11 | R+25 | Mike Conaway | Republican | 2004 | Incumbent re-elected. | ▌ ✓ Mike Conaway (Republican) Uncontested |
| Texas 12 | R+14 | Kay Granger | Republican | 1996 | Incumbent re-elected. | ▌ ✓ Kay Granger (Republican) 66.9%; ▌John Morris (Democratic) 31.1%; ▌Gardner Osborne (Libertarian) 2.0% |
| Texas 13 | R+18 | Mac Thornberry | Republican | 1994 | Incumbent re-elected. | ▌ ✓ Mac Thornberry (Republican) 74.4%; ▌Roger Waun (Democratic) 23.0%; ▌Jim Thompson (Libertarian) 2.6% |
| Texas 14 | R+14 | Ron Paul | Republican | 1976 (special); 1976 (defeated); 1978; 1984 (retired); 1996 | Incumbent re-elected. | ▌ ✓ Ron Paul (Republican) 60.2%; ▌Shane Sklar (Democratic) 39.8% |
| Texas 15 | D+3 | Rubén Hinojosa | Democratic | 1996 | Incumbent re-elected. | ▌ ✓ Rubén Hinojosa (Democratic) 61.8%; ▌Paul Haring (Republican) 23.7%; ▌Eddie Zamora (Republican) 14.5% |
| Texas 16 | D+9 | Silvestre Reyes | Democratic | 1996 | Incumbent re-elected. | ▌ ✓ Silvestre Reyes (Democratic) 78.7%; ▌Gordon Strickland (Libertarian) 21.3% |
| Texas 17 | R+18 | Chet Edwards | Democratic | 1990 | Incumbent re-elected. | ▌ ✓ Chet Edwards (Democratic) 58.1%; ▌Van Taylor (Republican) 40.3%; ▌Guillermo Acosta (Libertarian) 1.6% |
| Texas 18 | D+23 | Sheila Jackson Lee | Democratic | 1994 | Incumbent re-elected. | ▌ ✓ Sheila Jackson Lee (Democratic) 76.6%; ▌Ahmad Hassan (Republican) 19.1%; ▌Patrick Warren (Libertarian) 4.3% |
| Texas 19 | R+25 | Randy Neugebauer | Republican | 2002 | Incumbent re-elected. | ▌ ✓ Randy Neugebauer (Republican) 67.7%; ▌Robert Ricketts (Democratic) 29.8%; ▌Fred Jones (Libertarian) 2.4% |
| Texas 20 | D+8 | Charlie González | Democratic | 1998 | Incumbent re-elected. | ▌ ✓ Charlie González (Democratic) 87.4%; ▌Michael Idrogo (Libertarian) 12.6% |
| Texas 21 | R+13 | Lamar S. Smith | Republican | 1986 | Incumbent re-elected. | ▌ ✓ Lamar S. Smith (Republican) 60.1%; ▌John Courage (Democratic) 24.5%; ▌Gene Kelly (Democratic) 9.0%; ▌Tommy Calvert (Independent) 2.6%; ▌James Arthur Strohm (Libertarian) 2.0%; ▌Jim Peterson (Independent) 1.1%; ▌Mark Rossano (Independent) 0.7% |
| Texas 22 | R+15 | Vacant | | | Rep. Tom DeLay (R) resigned June 9, 2006. New member elected. Democratic gain. Winner was not elected to fill expired term, see above. | ▌ ✓ Nick Lampson (Democratic) 51.8%; ▌Shelley Sekula-Gibbs (Republican write-in) 41.8%; ▌Bob Smither (Libertarian) 6.1% |
| Texas 23 | R+4 | Henry Bonilla | Republican | 1992 | Incumbent lost re-election in run-off (district was declared unconstitutional by Supreme Court in August 2006 and redrawn). Democratic gain. | First round: ▌ Henry Bonilla (Republican) 48.6%; ▌ Ciro Rodriguez (Democratic) 19.9%; ▌Alvert Uresti (Democratic) 11.8%; ▌Lukin Gilliland (Democratic) 11.1%; ▌Craig Stephens (Libertarian) 2.7%; ▌Augie Beltran (Democratic) 2.1%; ▌Rick Bolanos (Democratic) 2.1%; ▌Adrian DeLeon (Democratic) 1.8%; Runoff: ▌ ✓ Ciro Rodriguez (Democratic) 54.3%; ▌Henry Bonilla (Republican) 45.7% |
| Texas 24 | R+15 | Kenny Marchant | Republican | 2004 | Incumbent re-elected. | ▌ ✓ Kenny Marchant (Republican) 59.8%; ▌Gary R. Page (Democratic) 37.2%; ▌Mark Frohman (Libertarian) 3.0% |
| Texas 25 | D+1 | Lloyd Doggett | Democratic | 1994 | Incumbent re-elected. | ▌ ✓ Lloyd Doggett (Democratic) 67.3%; ▌Grant Rostig (Republican) 26.3%; ▌Barbara Cunningham (Libertarian) 4.2%; ▌Brian Parrett (Independent) 2.2% |
| Texas 26 | R+12 | Michael C. Burgess | Republican | 2002 | Incumbent re-elected. | ▌ ✓ Michael C. Burgess (Republican) 60.2%; ▌Tim Barnwell (Democratic) 37.2%; ▌Rich Haas (Libertarian) 2.5% |
| Texas 27 | R+1 | Solomon P. Ortiz | Democratic | 1982 | Incumbent re-elected. | ▌ ✓ Solomon P. Ortiz (Democratic) 56.8%; ▌Willie Vaden (Republican) 38.9%; ▌Robert Powell (Libertarian) 4.3% |
| Texas 28 | R+1 | Henry Cuellar | Democratic | 2004 | Incumbent re-elected. | ▌ ✓ Henry Cuellar (Democratic) 67.6%; ▌Frank Enriquez (Democratic) 20.3%; ▌Ron Avery (Constitution) 12.1% |
| Texas 29 | D+8 | Gene Green | Democratic | 1992 | Incumbent re-elected. | ▌ ✓ Gene Green (Democratic) 73.5%; ▌Eric Story (Republican) 24.4%; ▌Clifford Lee Messina (Libertarian) 2.0% |
| Texas 30 | D+26 | Eddie Bernice Johnson | Democratic | 1992 | Incumbent re-elected. | ▌ ✓ Eddie Bernice Johnson (Democratic) 80.2%; ▌Wilson Aurbach (Republican) 17.6%; ▌Ken Ashby (Libertarian) 2.2% |
| Texas 31 | R+15 | John Carter | Republican | 2002 | Incumbent re-elected. | ▌ ✓ John Carter (Republican) 58.5%; ▌Mary Beth Harrell (Democratic) 38.8%; ▌Matt McAdoo (Libertarian) 2.7% |
| Texas 32 | R+11 | Pete Sessions | Republican | 1996 | Incumbent re-elected. | ▌ ✓ Pete Sessions (Republican) 56.4%; ▌Will Pryor (Democratic) 41.3%; ▌John Hawley (Libertarian) 2.3% |

== Utah ==
| District | | Incumbent | | | Results | Candidates |
| District | 2004 CPVI | Representative | Party | First elected | Results | Candidates |
|---|---|---|---|---|---|---|
| Utah 1 | R+26 | Rob Bishop | Republican | 2002 | Incumbent re-elected. | ▌ ✓ Rob Bishop (Republican) 63.1%; ▌Steven Olsen (Democratic) 32.4%; ▌Mark Hudson (Constitution) 3.1%; ▌Lynn Badler (Libertarian) 1.4% |
| Utah 2 | R+17 | Jim Matheson | Democratic | 2000 | Incumbent re-elected. | ▌ ✓ Jim Matheson (Democratic) 59.0%; ▌LaVar Christensen (Republican) 37.3%; ▌David Perry (Constitution) 1.5%; ▌Bob Brister (Green) 1.5%; ▌Austin Sherwood Lett (Libertarian) 0.7% |
| Utah 3 | R+22 | Chris Cannon | Republican | 1996 | Incumbent re-elected. | ▌ ✓ Chris Cannon (Republican) 57.7%; ▌Christian Burridge (Democratic) 32.2%; ▌Jim Noorlander (Constitution) 8.8%; ▌Philip Hallman (Libertarian) 1.3% |

== Vermont ==
| District | | Incumbent | | | Results | Candidates |
| District | 2004 CPVI | Representative | Party | First elected | Results | Candidates |
|---|---|---|---|---|---|---|
| Vermont at-large | D+8 | Bernie Sanders | Independent | 1990 | Incumbent retired to run for U.S. Senator. Democratic gain. | ▌ ✓ Peter Welch (Democratic) 53.2%; ▌Martha Rainville (Republican) 44.5%; ▌Dennis Morrisseau (Independent) 0.5%; ▌Jerry Trudell (Independent) 0.3%; ▌Bruce Marshall (Green) 0.3%; ▌Keith Stern (Independent) 0.3%; ▌Jane Newton (Liberty Union) 0.2%; ▌Chris Karr (Independent) 0.2% |

== Virginia ==
| District | | Incumbent | | | Results | Candidates |
| District | 2004 CPVI | Representative | Party | First elected | Results | Candidates |
|---|---|---|---|---|---|---|
| Virginia 1 | R+9 | Jo Ann Davis | Republican | 2000 | Incumbent re-elected. | ▌ ✓ Jo Ann Davis (Republican) 63.0%; ▌Shawn O'Donnell (Democratic) 35.5%; ▌Marvin Pixton III (Independent) 1.4% |
| Virginia 2 | R+6 | Thelma Drake | Republican | 2004 | Incumbent re-elected. | ▌ ✓ Thelma Drake (Republican) 51.3%; ▌Phil Kellam (Democratic) 48.5% |
| Virginia 3 | D+18 | Robert C. Scott | Democratic | 1992 | Incumbent re-elected. | ▌ ✓ Robert C. Scott (Democratic) 96.2% |
| Virginia 4 | R+5 | Randy Forbes | Republican | 2001 (special) | Incumbent re-elected. | ▌ ✓ Randy Forbes (Republican) 76.1%; ▌Albert Burckard (Ind. Green) 23.4% |
| Virginia 5 | R+6 | Virgil Goode | Republican | 1996 (Note: Goode was elected as Democrat. He left the party in January 2000 and became a Republican in August 2002.) | Incumbent re-elected. | ▌ ✓ Virgil Goode (Republican) 59.1%; ▌Al Weed (Democratic) 39.9%; ▌Joseph Oddo (Ind. Green) 0.9% |
| Virginia 6 | R+11 | Bob Goodlatte | Republican | 1992 | Incumbent re-elected. | ▌ ✓ Bob Goodlatte (Republican) 75.1%; ▌Barbara Jean Pryor (Independent) 12.3%; ▌Andre Peery (Independent) 12.1% |
| Virginia 7 | R+11 | Eric Cantor | Republican | 2000 | Incumbent re-elected. | ▌ ✓ Eric Cantor (Republican) 63.9%; ▌Jim Nachman (Democratic) 34.4%; ▌Brad Blanton (Independent) 1.6% |
| Virginia 8 | D+14 | Jim Moran | Democratic | 1990 | Incumbent re-elected. | ▌ ✓ Jim Moran (Democratic) 66.4%; ▌Thomas O'Donoghue (Republican) 30.6%; ▌Jim Hurysz (Independent) 2.8% |
| Virginia 9 | R+7 | Rick Boucher | Democratic | 1982 | Incumbent re-elected. | ▌ ✓ Rick Boucher (Democratic) 67.8%; ▌Bill Carrico (Republican) 32.2% |
| Virginia 10 | R+5 | Frank Wolf | Republican | 1980 | Incumbent re-elected. | ▌ ✓ Frank Wolf (Republican) 57.3%; ▌Judy Feder (Democratic) 41.0%; Others: ▌Bill Wood (Libertarian) 0.9%; ▌Neeraj Nigam (Independent) 0.8% |
| Virginia 11 | R+1 | Thomas M. Davis | Republican | 1994 | Incumbent re-elected. | ▌ ✓ Thomas M. Davis (Republican) 55.5%; ▌Andrew Hurst (Democratic) 43.6%; ▌Fernando Greco (Ind. Green) 0.9% |

== Washington ==
| District | | Incumbent | | | Results | Candidates |
| District | 2004 CPVI | Representative | Party | First elected | Results | Candidates |
|---|---|---|---|---|---|---|
| Washington 1 | D+7 | Jay Inslee | Democratic | 1992; 1994 (defeated); 1998 | Incumbent re-elected. | ▌ ✓ Jay Inslee (Democratic) 67.7%; ▌Larry Ishmael (Republican) 32.3% |
| Washington 2 | D+3 | Rick Larsen | Democratic | 2000 | Incumbent re-elected. | ▌ ✓ Rick Larsen (Democratic) 64.2%; ▌Doug Roulstone (Republican) 35.8% |
| Washington 3 | EVEN | Brian Baird | Democratic | 1998 | Incumbent re-elected. | ▌ ✓ Brian Baird (Democratic) 63.1%; ▌Michael Messmore (Republican) 36.9% |
| Washington 4 | R+13 | Doc Hastings | Republican | 1994 | Incumbent re-elected. | ▌ ✓ Doc Hastings (Republican) 59.9%; ▌Richard Wright (Democratic) 40.1% |
| Washington 5 | R+7 | Cathy McMorris | Republican | 2004 | Incumbent re-elected. | ▌ ✓ Cathy McMorris (Republican) 56.4%; ▌Peter Goldmark (Democratic) 43.6% |
| Washington 6 | D+6 | Norm Dicks | Democratic | 1976 | Incumbent re-elected. | ▌ ✓ Norm Dicks (Democratic) 70.6%; ▌Doug Cloud (Republican) 29.4% |
| Washington 7 | D+30 | Jim McDermott | Democratic | 1988 | Incumbent re-elected. | ▌ ✓ Jim McDermott (Democratic) 79.4%; ▌Steve Beren (Republican) 15.7%; ▌Linnea Noreen (Independent) 4.9% |
| Washington 8 | D+2 | Dave Reichert | Republican | 2004 | Incumbent re-elected. | ▌ ✓ Dave Reichert (Republican) 51.5%; ▌Darcy Burner (Democratic) 48.5% |
| Washington 9 | D+6 | Adam Smith | Democratic | 1996 | Incumbent re-elected. | ▌ ✓ Adam Smith (Democratic) 65.7%; ▌Steve Cofchin (Republican) 34.3% |

== West Virginia ==
| District | | Incumbent | | | Results | Candidates |
| District | 2004 CPVI | Representative | Party | First elected | Results | Candidates |
|---|---|---|---|---|---|---|
| West Virginia 1 | R+6 | Alan Mollohan | Democratic | 1982 | Incumbent re-elected. | ▌ ✓ Alan Mollohan (Democratic) 64.3%; ▌Christopher Wakim (Republican) 35.6% |
| West Virginia 2 | R+5 | Shelley Moore Capito | Republican | 2000 | Incumbent re-elected. | ▌ ✓ Shelley Moore Capito (Republican) 57.2%; ▌Mike Callaghan (Democratic) 42.8% |
| West Virginia 3 | EVEN | Nick Rahall | Democratic | 1976 | Incumbent re-elected. | ▌ ✓ Nick Rahall (Democratic) 69.4%; ▌Kim Wolfe (Republican) 30.6% |

== Wisconsin ==
| District | | Incumbent | | | Results | Candidates |
| District | 2004 CPVI | Representative | Party | First elected | Results | Candidates |
|---|---|---|---|---|---|---|
| Wisconsin 1 | R+2 | Paul Ryan | Republican | 1998 | Incumbent re-elected. | ▌ ✓ Paul Ryan (Republican) 62.8%; ▌Jeff Thomas (Democratic) 37.2% |
| Wisconsin 2 | D+13 | Tammy Baldwin | Democratic | 1998 | Incumbent re-elected. | ▌ ✓ Tammy Baldwin (Democratic) 62.9%; ▌Dave Magnum (Republican) 37.1% |
| Wisconsin 3 | D+3 | Ron Kind | Democratic | 1996 | Incumbent re-elected. | ▌ ✓ Ron Kind (Democratic) 64.9%; ▌Paul Nelson (Republican) 35.1% |
| Wisconsin 4 | D+20 | Gwen Moore | Democratic | 2004 | Incumbent re-elected. | ▌ ✓ Gwen Moore (Democratic) 71.5%; ▌Perfecto Rivera (Republican) 28.5% |
| Wisconsin 5 | R+12 | Jim Sensenbrenner | Republican | 1978 | Incumbent re-elected. | ▌ ✓ Jim Sensenbrenner (Republican) 61.8%; ▌Bryan Kennedy (Democratic) 35.7%; ▌Bob Levis (Green) 1.4%; ▌Robert R. Raymond (Independent) 1.1% |
| Wisconsin 6 | R+5 | Tom Petri | Republican | 1979 | Incumbent re-elected. | ▌ ✓ Tom Petri (Republican) Uncontested |
| Wisconsin 7 | D+2 | Dave Obey | Democratic | 1969 | Incumbent re-elected. | ▌ ✓ Dave Obey (Democratic) 62.2%; ▌Nick Reid (Republican) 35.0%; ▌Mike Miles (Green) 2.8% |
| Wisconsin 8 | EVEN | Mark Green | Republican | 1998 | Incumbent retired to run for Governor. Democratic gain. | ▌ ✓ Steve Kagen (Democratic) 51.1%; ▌John Gard (Republican) 48.9% |

== Wyoming ==
| District | | Incumbent | | | Results | Candidates |
| District | 2004 CPVI | Representative | Party | First elected | Results | Candidates |
|---|---|---|---|---|---|---|
| Wyoming at-large | R+19 | Barbara Cubin | Republican | 1994 | Incumbent re-elected. | ▌ ✓ Barbara Cubin (Republican) 48.3%; ▌Gary Trauner (Democratic) 47.8%; ▌Thomas Rankin (Libertarian) 3.9% |

== Non-voting delegates ==
| District | Incumbent | Party | First elected | Results | Candidates |
|---|---|---|---|---|---|
| American Samoa at-large | Eni Faleomavaega | Democratic | 1988 | Incumbent re-elected. | ▌ ✓ Eni Faleomavaega (Democratic) Uncontested |
| District of Columbia at-large | Eleanor Holmes Norton | Democratic | 1990 | Incumbent re-elected. | ▌ ✓ Eleanor Holmes Norton (Democratic) Uncontested |
| Guam at-large | Madeleine Bordallo | Democratic | 2002 | Incumbent re-elected. | ▌ ✓ Madeleine Bordallo (Democratic) Uncontested |
| U.S. Virgin Islands at-large | Donna Christian-Christensen | Democratic | 1996 | Incumbent re-elected. | ▌ ✓ Donna Christian-Christensen (Democratic) 62.9%; ▌Warren Mosler (Independent) 37.1% |

== See also ==
- 2006 United States elections
  - 2006 United States gubernatorial elections
  - 2006 United States Senate elections
- 109th United States Congress
- 110th United States Congress
- Fighting Dems
