= Michael Ferguson =

Michael Ferguson or Mike Ferguson may refer to:

- Michael Ferguson (Irish politician) (1953–2006), Irish Sinn Féin politician who represented Belfast West
- Michael Ferguson (Australian politician) (born 1974), Australian politician
- Michael Ferguson (director) (1937–2021), British television director who worked on the BBC science fiction television series Doctor Who
- Michael Ferguson, Canadian policeman convicted for the manslaughter of Darren Varley
- Michael Ferguson (Auditor General) (1958–2019), Auditor General of Canada
- Michael Ferguson (Connecticut politician), member of the Connecticut House of Representatives
- Mick Ferguson (born 1954), former footballer from Newcastle, England
- Mike Ferguson (footballer) (1943–2019), footballer from Lancashire, England
- Michael Ferguson (New Jersey politician) (born 1970), United States politician from New Jersey
- Michael Ferguson (Florida politician) (born 1994), member of the Florida House of Representatives
- Michael Ferguson (biochemist) (born 1957), British biochemist, University of Dundee
- Mike Ferguson (golfer) (born 1952), Australian golfer
