= 2004 United States Senate election in California =

- November 2, 2004
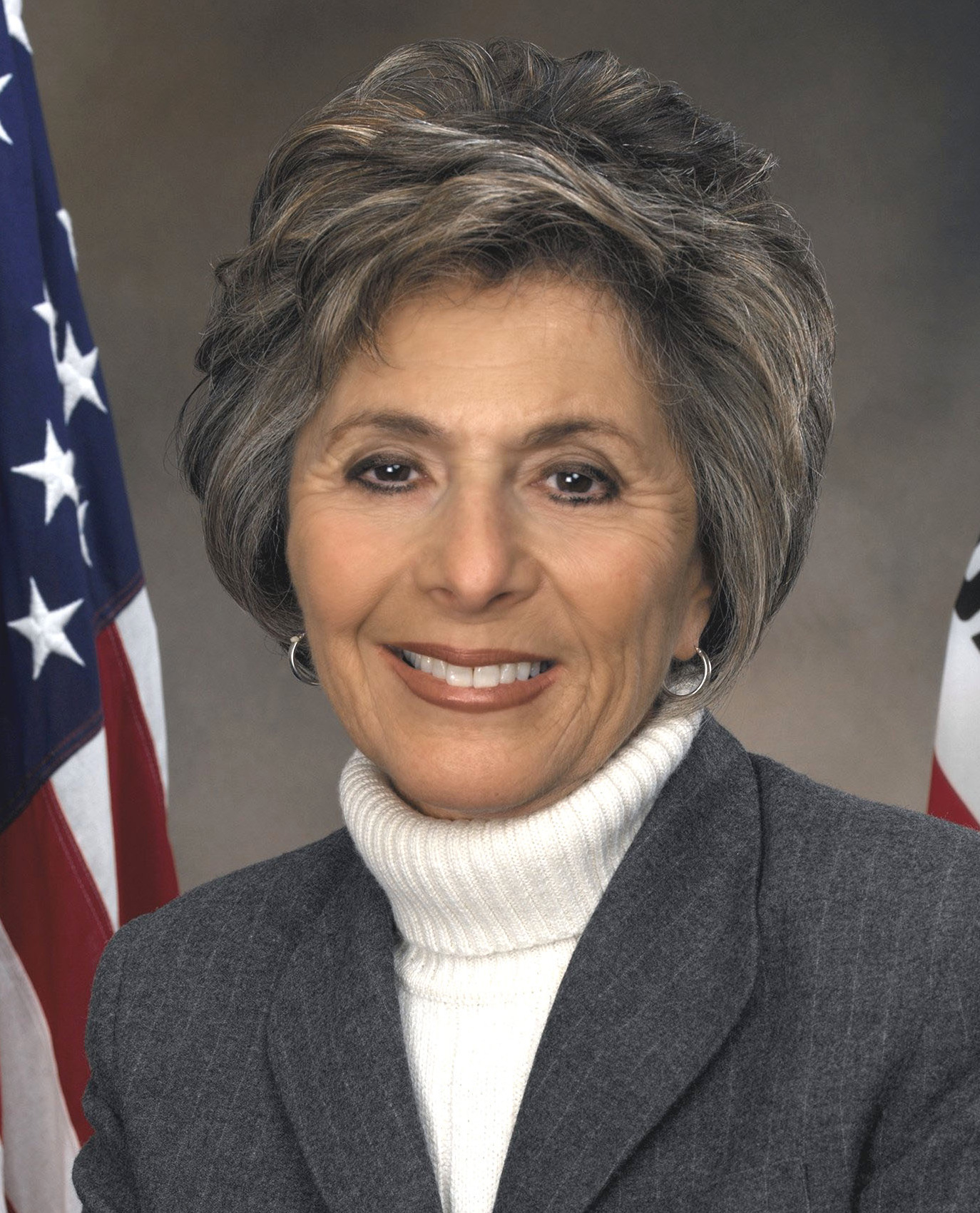

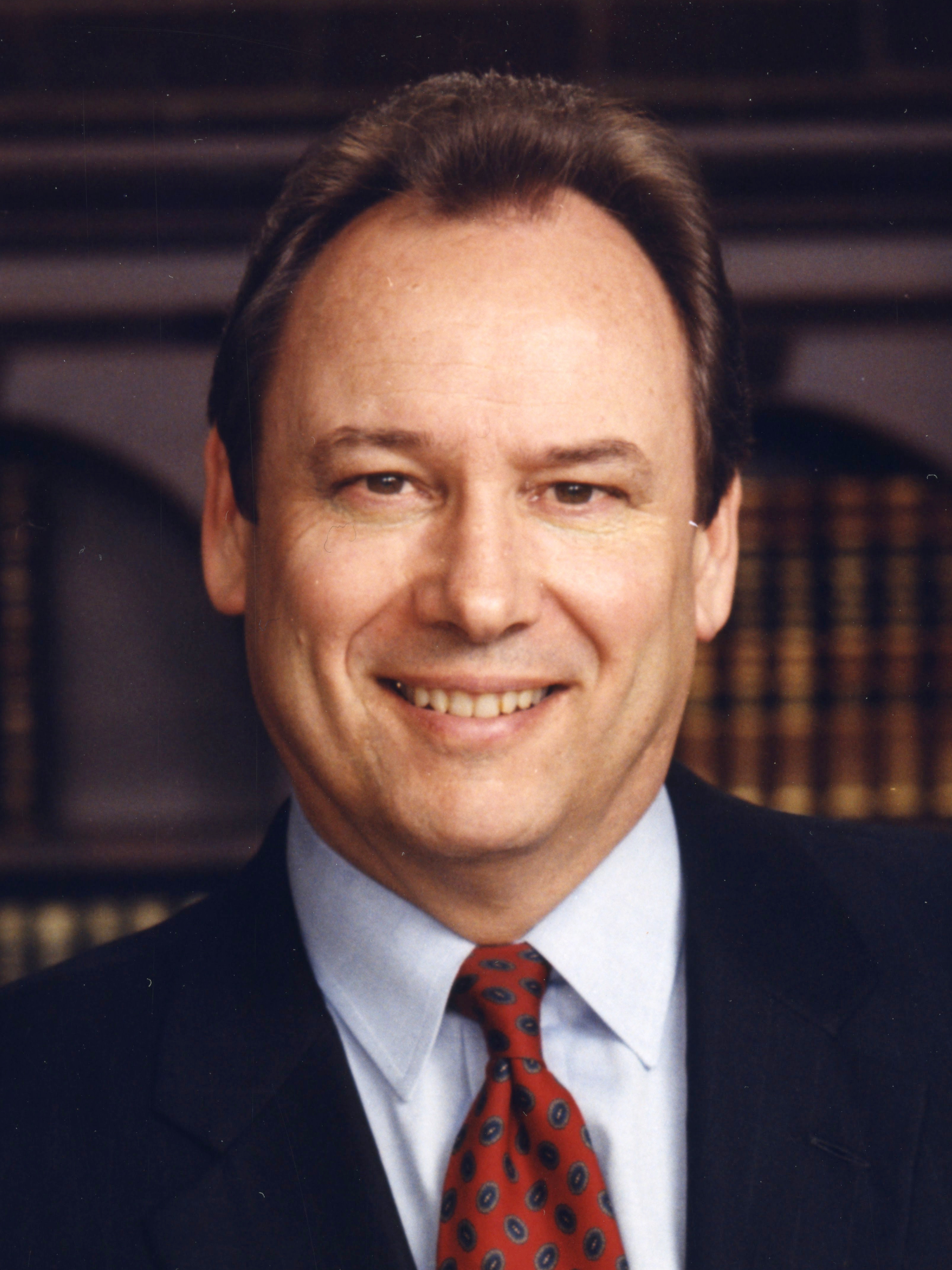
Nominee	Barbara Boxer	Bill Jones
Party	Democratic	Republican
Popular vote	6,955,728	4,555,922
Percentage	57.71%	37.80%
- Boxer: 40–50% 50–60% 60–70% 70–80% 80–90% Jones: 40–50% 50–60% 60–70%
U.S. senator before election
Barbara Boxer
Democratic
Elected U.S. Senator
Barbara Boxer
Democratic

The 2004 United States Senate election in California took place on November 2, 2004, alongside other elections to the United States Senate in other states, elections to the United States House of Representatives, and various state and local elections. Incumbent Democratic U.S. Senator Barbara Boxer ran for re-election and defeated Republican former Secretary of State Bill Jones. Boxer's 6.96 million votes set the all-time record for the most votes cast for one candidate in one state in one election, although it was surpassed by Senator Dianne Feinstein's 7.75 million votes in 2012.

== Democratic primary ==
=== Candidates ===
- Barbara Boxer, incumbent U.S. senator

=== Results ===
2004 United States Senate Democratic primary, California
Party	Candidate	Votes	%
Democratic	Barbara Boxer (incumbent)	2,566,298	100.00%

== Republican primary ==
=== Candidates ===
- Danney Ball, activist
- Toni Casey, former mayor of Los Altos Hills
- Barry L. Hatch, activist
- Bill Jones, former secretary of state of California and candidate for Governor in 2002
- Howard Kaloogian, former state assemblyman from San Diego County and chair of the Recall Gray Davis Committee
- Rosario Marin, former treasurer of the United States and mayor of Huntington Park
- Bill Quraishi, businessman
- James Stewart, businessman
- Tim Stoen, assistant district attorney
- John Van Zandt, businessman

=== Results ===
2004 California Republican primary
Party	Candidate	Votes	%
Republican	Bill Jones	1,015,748	44.81%
Republican	Rosario Marin	454,176	20.03%
Republican	Howard Kaloogian	253,331	11.17%
Republican	Toni Casey	142,080	6.27%
Republican	Tim Stoen	124,940	5.51%
Republican	James Stewart	78,264	3.45%
Republican	Barry L. Hatch	71,244	3.14%
Republican	John M. Van Zandt	56,925	2.51%
Republican	Danney Ball	37,745	1.66%
Republican	Bill Quraishi	32,515	1.43%
Total votes		2,266,968	100.00%

== Third party primaries ==
=== American Independent ===
2004 United States AI Senate primary, California
Party	Candidate	Votes	%
American Independent	Don J. Grundmann	32,025	100.00%

=== Libertarian ===
2004 United States Senate Libertarian primary, California
Candidate	Votes	%
Jim Gray	13,656	57.30%
Gail Lightfoot	10,177	42.70%
Total votes	23,833	100.00%

=== Peace and Freedom ===
2004 United States PF Senate primary, California
Party	Candidate	Votes	%
Peace and Freedom	Marsha Feinland	4,864	100.00%

== General election ==
=== Candidates ===
==== Major ====
- Barbara Boxer (D), incumbent U.S. senator
- Bill Jones (R), former California secretary of state

==== Minor ====
- Marsha Feinland (PF), perennial candidate
- James P. Gray (L), Superior Court jurist
- Don J. Grundmann (AI)

=== Campaign ===
Boxer had originally planned to retire in 2004, but changed her mind to "fight for the right to dissent" against conservatives such as House Majority Leader Tom DeLay. Jones was widely considered as the underdog. Jones got a major endorsement from the popular Governor Arnold Schwarzenegger. The two major candidates had a debate. Pre-election polling had Boxer leading in double digits. However, he never released a single TV ad. Boxer portrayed Jones as too conservative for California, citing his votes in the California Assembly (1982 to 1994) against gun control and an increased minimum wage, and in support of offshore drilling and a loosening of environmental regulations.

=== Fundraising ===
Jones raised about $700,000 more than Boxer during the third quarter, pulling in $2.5 million to Boxer's $1.8 million. Overall, Boxer raised $16 million to Jones' $6.2 million. Boxer spent about $7 million on radio and television ads alone.

=== Predictions ===
Source	Ranking	As of
Sabato's Crystal Ball	Safe D	November 1, 2004

=== Polling ===
Poll source	Date(s) administered	Sample size (Note: Key: A – all adults RV – registered voters LV – likely voters V – unclear)	Margin of error	Barbara Boxer (D)	Bill Jones (R)	Other / Undecided
SurveyUSA	October 29–31, 2004	763 (LV)	± 3.6%	57%	36%	7%

=== Endorsements ===
Barbara Boxer (D)

Newspapers

- The Desert Sun
- The Examiner
- Los Angeles Times
- Oakland Tribune
- The Sacramento Bee
- San Francisco Chronicle
- Santa Cruz Sentinel
Bill Jones (R)

Newspapers

- The Bakersfield Californian
- The Fresno Bee and The Modesto Bee
- Merced Sun-Star

== Results ==
The election was not close, with Boxer winning by an authoritative 20-point margin. Jones only performed well in rural parts of the state. Boxer won almost all major metropolitan areas in the state. The race was called right when the polls closed at 11:00 P.M. EST, and 7:00 P.M. PTZ. Jones conceded defeat to Boxer at 11:12 P.M. EST, and 7:12 PTZ.

2004 United States Senate election, California
Party	Candidate	Votes	%
Democratic	Barbara Boxer (incumbent)	6,955,728	57.71%
Republican	Bill Jones	4,555,922	37.80%
Peace and Freedom	Marsha Feinland	243,846	2.02%
Libertarian	James P. "Jim" Gray	216,522	1.80%
American Independent	Don J. Grundmann	81,244	0.67%
No party	Dennis Richter (write-in)	43	0.00%
No party	Howard Johnson (write-in)	8	0.00%
No party	John Emery Jones (write-in)	2	0.00%
Invalid or blank votes		536,388	4.26%
Total votes		12,589,703	100.00%
Turnout			57.03%
Democratic hold			

=== By county ===
Final results from the Secretary of State of California.

County	Boxer	Votes	Jones	Votes	Feinland	Votes	Others	Votes
San Francisco	82.67%	277,193	12.83%	43,029	2.15%	7,220	2.34%	7,862
Alameda	75.66%	403,892	20.23%	107,966	2.22%	11,851	1.89%	10,103
Marin	70.86%	94,164	25.81%	34,301	1.44%	1,915	1.89%	2,505
San Mateo	70.53%	196,285	26.29%	73,171	1.33%	3,715	1.84%	5,126
Santa Cruz	70.58%	84,840	23.49%	28,239	2.77%	3,329	3.15%	3,791
Los Angeles	66.75%	1,940,493	28.29%	822,351	2.36%	68,743	2.60%	75,449
Santa Clara	66.00%	380,551	29.83%	172,008	1.66%	9,550	2.51%	14,487
Sonoma	65.67%	143,124	29.57%	64,438	2.28%	4,962	2.49%	5,419
Contra Costa	63.49%	258,905	33.24%	135,559	1.48%	6,044	1.78%	7,277
Monterey	62.31%	76,647	32.96%	40,547	1.84%	2,263	2.89%	3,560
Yolo	61.94%	44,085	34.05%	24,234	1.88%	1,340	2.13%	1,518
Mendocino	61.87%	23,415	29.41%	11,131	2.76%	1,044	5.96%	2,254
Solano	61.32%	89,779	35.07%	51,354	1.61%	2,355	2.00%	2,929
Napa	60.30%	33,577	35.94%	20,012	1.59%	884	2.17%	1,208
Humboldt	58.76%	38,016	34.61%	22,394	3.47%	2,246	3.16%	2,044
Imperial	57.65%	19,498	36.06%	12,195	3.43%	1,159	2.87%	971
Lake	56.32%	13,812	39.22%	9,619	1.91%	469	2.55%	625
San Benito	55.82%	10,349	39.73%	7,365	1.96%	363	2.49%	462
Santa Barbara	55.10%	91,055	40.02%	66,146	2.03%	3,347	2.85%	4,717
Sacramento	54.16%	252,016	42.34%	196,984	1.50%	6,995	2.00%	9,283
Alpine	53.90%	373	41.76%	289	2.31%	16	2.02%	14
San Joaquin	53.00%	99,074	42.98%	80,350	1.92%	3,582	2.10%	3,921
Ventura	52.13%	159,920	43.66%	133,917	1.84%	5,630	2.37%	7,284
San Diego	51.45%	565,457	44.13%	484,948	2.04%	22,431	2.38%	26,125
Mono	49.95%	2,592	44.59%	2,314	2.14%	111	3.31%	172
San Bernardino	49.76%	251,776	45.36%	229,527	2.18%	11,038	2.70%	13,655
Merced	49.65%	27,975	46.18%	26,023	1.95%	1,098	2.22%	1,251
Riverside	47.39%	259,169	48.67%	266,197	1.93%	10,547	2.01%	11,015
Stanislaus	46.93%	67,539	49.70%	71,527	1.61%	2,324	1.75%	2,517
San Luis Obispo	46.49%	58,212	48.48%	60,708	2.12%	2,659	2.91%	3,646
Trinity	46.24%	2,960	47.93%	3,068	2.17%	139	3.66%	234
Del Norte	46.03%	4,264	48.72%	4,513	2.29%	212	2.97%	275
Nevada	45.79%	24,367	49.46%	26,321	1.90%	1,013	2.85%	1,518
Fresno	45.36%	109,849	51.59%	124,937	1.61%	3,905	1.44%	3,495
Butte	44.96%	42,512	49.12%	46,446	2.52%	2,385	3.39%	3,204
Tuolumne	44.38%	11,538	52.39%	13,620	1.23%	319	2.00%	519
Orange	43.73%	458,604	50.86%	533,406	1.94%	20,394	3.47%	36,374
Kings	42.71%	13,485	54.07%	17,075	1.71%	539	1.51%	478
Amador	42.16%	7,445	54.15%	9,562	1.53%	271	2.15%	380
Calaveras	42.17%	9,339	53.58%	11,865	1.51%	334	2.75%	608
Inyo	40.68%	3,474	54.37%	4,643	2.08%	178	2.86%	244
Mariposa	40.38%	3,437	55.82%	4,751	1.69%	144	2.10%	179
Siskiyou	39.92%	8,215	54.95%	11,308	1.94%	399	3.18%	655
Placer	39.70%	59,554	56.78%	85,163	1.46%	2,197	2.06%	3,086
Plumas	39.59%	4,347	54.82%	6,019	2.21%	243	3.38%	371
El Dorado	39.58%	33,715	56.09%	47,775	2.05%	1,743	2.29%	1,950
Madera	39.15%	15,058	57.84%	22,249	1.67%	641	1.35%	519
Yuba	38.94%	6,926	55.80%	9,925	2.21%	393	3.05%	542
Kern	38.13%	79,769	56.82%	118,882	2.17%	4,543	2.88%	6,026
Tulare	37.11%	36,181	59.55%	58,066	1.84%	1,798	1.50%	1,464
Colusa	36.61%	2,228	60.10%	3,657	1.23%	75	2.05%	125
Sutter	36.61%	10,864	60.06%	17,824	1.47%	436	1.86%	553
Tehama	36.18%	8,285	58.89%	13,488	1.76%	403	3.17%	726
Shasta	35.21%	26,795	60.00%	45,667	1.86%	1,412	2.94%	2,235
Sierra	34.89%	679	58.74%	1,143	1.90%	37	4.47%	87
Glenn	33.87%	3,147	61.77%	5,739	1.86%	173	2.50%	232
Lassen	32.36%	3,655	62.43%	7,051	1.97%	223	3.24%	366
Modoc	28.48%	1,253	66.27%	2,916	1.52%	67	3.73%	164

=== Counties that flipped from Republican to Democratic ===
- Alpine (largest municipality: Markleeville)
- Mono (largest municipality: Mammoth Lakes)
- San Diego (largest community: San Diego)
- San Joaquin (largest city: Stockton)
- Ventura (largest city: Ventura)

=== By congressional district ===
Boxer won 36 of 53 congressional districts, including three that elected Republicans.

District	Boxer	Jones	Representative
1st	60%	34%	Mike Thompson
2nd	40%	56%	Wally Herger
3rd	46%	51%	Doug Ose
3rd	46%	51%	Dan Lungren
4th	40%	56%	John Doolittle
5th	65%	31%	Bob Matsui
6th	68%	27%	Lynn Woolsey
7th	69%	27%	George Miller
8th	84%	12%	Nancy Pelosi
9th	84%	11%	Barbara Lee
10th	60%	37%	Ellen Tauscher
11th	50%	47%	Richard Pombo
12th	73%	24%	Tom Lantos
13th	73%	23%	Pete Stark
14th	68%	29%	Anna Eshoo
15th	65%	31%	Mike Honda
16th	67%	28%	Zoe Lofgren
17th	66%	29%	Sam Farr
18th	57%	39%	Dennis Cardoza
19th	42%	55%	George Radanovich
20th	57%	38%	Cal Dooley
20th	57%	38%	Jim Costa
21st	38%	59%	Devin Nunes
22nd	36%	60%	Bill Thomas
23rd	60%	35%	Lois Capps
24th	47%	48%	Elton Gallegly
25th	46%	49%	Howard McKeon
26th	48%	47%	David Dreier
27th	64%	31%	Brad Sherman
28th	74%	21%	Howard Berman
29th	64%	31%	Adam Schiff
30th	69%	27%	Henry Waxman
31st	80%	15%	Xavier Becerra
32nd	68%	26%	Hilda Solis
33rd	84%	12%	Diane Watson
34th	74%	21%	Lucille Roybal-Allard
35th	80%	15%	Maxine Waters
36th	62%	33%	Jane Harman
37th	76%	18%	Juanita Millender-McDonald
38th	71%	23%	Grace Napolitano
39th	64%	31%	Linda Sánchez
40th	44%	51%	Ed Royce
41st	44%	52%	Jerry Lewis
42nd	42%	54%	Gary Miller
43rd	64%	30%	Joe Baca
44th	45%	51%	Ken Calvert
45th	49%	47%	Mary Bono Mack
46th	46%	49%	Dana Rohrabacher
47th	57%	35%	Loretta Sanchez
48th	44%	51%	Christopher Cox
48th	44%	51%	John Campbell
49th	42%	54%	Darrell Issa
50th	48.1%	48.2%	Brian Bilbray
51st	61%	34%	Bob Filner
52nd	44%	51%	Duncan Hunter
53rd	64%	31%	Susan Davis

=== By city ===
City	County	Barbara Boxer Democratic		Bill Jones Republican		Don Grundmann American Independent		Jim Gray Libertarian		Marsha Feinland Peace and Freedom		Total Votes	Margin	Margin %	Swing from 2004 presidential (Kerry to Boxer)%
		#	%	#	%	#	%	#	%	#	%		#	%	
Alameda	Alameda	22480	74.13	6501	21.44	190	0.63	497	1.64	656	2.16	30324	15979	52.69	2
Albany	Alameda	6649	85.2	804	10.3	20	0.26	102	1.31	229	2.93	7804	5845	74.9	-2.25
Berkeley	Alameda	50787	88.35	3639	6.33	147	0.26	830	1.44	2078	3.62	57481	47148	82.02	-2.48
Dublin	Alameda	7480	58.28	4823	37.58	83	0.65	252	1.96	196	1.53	12834	2657	20.7	6.42
Emeryville	Alameda	2922	84.45	351	10.14	15	0.43	64	1.85	108	3.12	3460	2571	74.31	-0.8
Fremont	Alameda	45348	69.27	17798	27.19	371	0.57	954	1.46	992	1.52	65463	27550	42.08	7.9
Hayward	Alameda	27124	76.02	6877	19.27	292	0.82	613	1.72	773	2.17	35679	20247	56.75	6.85
Livermore	Alameda	17730	53.45	14435	43.52	169	0.51	441	1.33	396	1.19	33171	3295	9.93	9
Newark	Alameda	9466	72.12	3192	24.32	83	0.63	182	1.39	203	1.55	13126	6274	47.8	9.39
Oakland	Alameda	123356	87.7	11251	8	538	0.38	1530	1.09	3987	2.83	140662	112105	79.7	-0.18
Piedmont	Alameda	4552	69.69	1788	27.37	14	0.21	109	1.67	69	1.06	6532	2764	42.32	-3.55
Pleasanton	Alameda	16610	54.38	13058	42.75	125	0.41	387	1.27	363	1.19	30543	3552	11.63	5.88
San Leandro	Alameda	21022	74.63	5925	21.04	228	0.81	418	1.48	574	2.04	28167	15097	53.59	5.25
Unincorporated area of Alameda County	Alameda	33451	67.84	13791	27.97	358	0.73	788	1.6	922	1.87	49310	19660	39.87	4.75
Union City	Alameda	14915	77.52	3733	19.4	89	0.46	197	1.02	305	1.59	19239	11182	58.12	10.1
Unincorporated area of Alpine County	Alpine	373	53.9	289	41.76	11	1.59	3	0.43	16	2.31	692	84	12.14	3.27
Amador	Amador	63	49.22	58	45.31	1	0.78	3	2.34	3	2.34	128	5	3.91	14.76
Ione	Amador	605	37.95	924	57.97	6	0.38	27	1.69	32	2.01	1594	-319	-20.02	19.15
Jackson	Amador	939	46.97	993	49.67	15	0.75	22	1.1	30	1.5	1999	-54	-2.7	16.27
Plymouth	Amador	215	44.51	250	51.76	8	1.66	4	0.83	6	1.24	483	-35	-7.25	21.15
Sutter Creek	Amador	604	46.32	657	50.38	11	0.84	12	0.92	20	1.53	1304	-53	-4.06	7.97
Unapportioned absentees of Amador County (2000)	Amador	1979	39.27	2900	57.54	26	0.52	70	1.39	65	1.29	5040	-921	-18.27	9.31
Unincorporated area of Amador County	Amador	3040	42.76	3780	53.16	72	1.01	103	1.45	115	1.62	7110	-740	-10.4	15.16
Biggs	Butte	210	39.03	309	57.43	2	0.37	6	1.12	11	2.04	538	-99	-18.4	9.88
Chico	Butte	16799	54.09	12225	39.36	283	0.91	802	2.58	950	3.06	31059	4574	14.73	2.12
Gridley	Butte	766	47.28	786	48.52	10	0.62	20	1.23	38	2.35	1620	-20	-1.24	14.6
Oroville	Butte	1658	42.33	1975	50.42	72	1.84	86	2.2	126	3.22	3917	-317	-8.09	10.84
Paradise	Butte	5882	42.13	7335	52.54	163	1.17	278	1.99	302	2.16	13960	-1453	-10.41	6.77
Unincorporated area of Butte County	Butte	17197	39.58	23816	54.81	546	1.26	936	2.15	958	2.2	43453	-6619	-15.23	6.65
Angels	Calaveras	348	40.28	474	54.86	8	0.93	25	2.89	9	1.04	864	-126	-14.58	15.35
Unapportioned absentees of Calaveras County (2000)	Calaveras	4261	40.95	5741	55.18	90	0.86	169	1.62	144	1.38	10405	-1480	-14.23	11.51
Unincorporated area of Calaveras County	Calaveras	4730	43.49	5650	51.94	104	0.96	212	1.95	181	1.66	10877	-920	-8.45	13.07
Colusa	Colusa	741	39.31	1074	56.98	19	1.01	22	1.17	29	1.54	1885	-333	-17.67	14.46
Unincorporated area of Colusa County	Colusa	1141	33	2221	64.23	29	0.84	36	1.04	31	0.9	3458	-1080	-31.23	10.69
Williams	Colusa	346	46.63	362	48.79	9	1.21	10	1.35	15	2.02	742	-16	-2.16	12.85
Antioch	Contra Costa	21441	65	10310	31.26	227	0.69	475	1.44	532	1.61	32985	11131	33.74	9.2
Brentwood	Contra Costa	7823	52.3	6789	45.39	81	0.54	90	0.6	174	1.16	14957	1034	6.91	11.5
Clayton	Contra Costa	3054	48.61	3077	48.97	22	0.35	63	1	67	1.07	6283	-23	-0.36	5.56
Concord	Contra Costa	28148	62.12	15309	33.78	297	0.66	740	1.63	820	1.81	45314	12839	28.34	4.52
Danville	Contra Costa	11365	48.83	11473	49.29	69	0.3	208	0.89	162	0.7	23277	-108	-0.46	4.34
El Cerrito	Contra Costa	9556	81.73	1702	14.56	25	0.21	155	1.33	254	2.17	11692	7854	67.17	-1.94
Hercules	Contra Costa	6722	77.46	1677	19.32	38	0.44	82	0.94	159	1.83	8678	5045	58.14	6.23
Lafayette	Contra Costa	8130	57.88	5470	38.94	45	0.32	244	1.74	157	1.12	14046	2660	18.94	-2.88
Martinez	Contra Costa	11418	64.08	5636	31.63	121	0.68	315	1.77	327	1.84	17817	5782	32.45	4.43
Moraga	Contra Costa	4870	54.64	3783	42.44	27	0.3	131	1.47	102	1.14	8913	1087	12.2	-1.44
Oakley	Contra Costa	5384	59.12	3431	37.67	74	0.81	91	1	127	1.39	9107	1953	21.45	13.71
Orinda	Contra Costa	6654	58.64	4369	38.5	30	0.26	186	1.64	108	0.95	11347	2285	20.14	-4.21
Pinole	Contra Costa	5608	70.55	2061	25.93	42	0.53	100	1.26	138	1.74	7949	3547	44.62	4.19
Pittsburg	Contra Costa	12445	74.05	3673	21.86	113	0.67	246	1.46	329	1.96	16806	8772	52.19	8.55
Pleasant Hill	Contra Costa	10225	64.17	5074	31.84	95	0.6	250	1.57	291	1.83	15935	5151	32.33	2.91
Richmond	Contra Costa	26279	86.09	3175	10.4	108	0.35	303	0.99	661	2.17	30526	23104	75.69	2.76
San Pablo	Contra Costa	4549	83.91	634	11.7	33	0.61	67	1.24	138	2.55	5421	3915	72.21	6.37
San Ramon	Contra Costa	13250	55.42	10015	41.89	113	0.47	293	1.23	239	1	23910	3235	13.53	6.52
Unincorporated area of Contra Costa County	Contra Costa	40312	60.45	24292	36.42	378	0.57	767	1.15	942	1.41	66691	16020	24.03	4.64
Walnut Creek	Contra Costa	21672	59.99	13609	37.67	152	0.42	379	1.05	317	0.88	36129	8063	22.32	0.68
Crescent City	Del Norte	612	52.13	476	40.55	18	1.53	25	2.13	43	3.66	1174	136	11.58	13
Unincorporated area of Del Norte County	Del Norte	3652	45.14	4037	49.9	83	1.03	149	1.84	169	2.09	8090	-385	-4.76	0
Placerville	El Dorado	2071	47.71	2073	47.75	43	0.99	60	1.38	94	2.17	4341	-2	-0.04	11.34
South Lake Tahoe	El Dorado	3802	56.33	2309	34.21	79	1.17	189	2.8	370	5.48	6749	1493	22.12	1.35
Unincorporated area of El Dorado County	El Dorado	27842	37.58	43393	58.57	543	0.73	1036	1.4	1279	1.73	74093	-15551	-20.99	7.79
Clovis	Fresno	11323	35.75	19491	61.54	106	0.33	277	0.87	477	1.51	31674	-8168	-25.79	11.53
Coalinga	Fresno	1098	41.26	1462	54.94	20	0.75	33	1.24	48	1.8	2661	-364	-13.68	18.38
Firebaugh	Fresno	564	56.57	401	40.22	6	0.6	5	0.5	21	2.11	997	163	16.35	9.57
Fowler	Fresno	673	53.33	553	43.82	6	0.48	16	1.27	14	1.11	1262	120	9.51	16.48
Fresno	Fresno	61605	50.43	56388	46.16	524	0.43	1424	1.17	2224	1.82	122165	5217	4.27	8.7
Huron	Fresno	455	83.49	58	10.64	1	0.18	17	3.12	14	2.57	545	397	72.85	11.45
Kerman	Fresno	1164	52.86	939	42.64	12	0.54	31	1.41	56	2.54	2202	225	10.22	11.69
Kingsburg	Fresno	1287	30.75	2826	67.51	13	0.31	15	0.36	45	1.08	4186	-1539	-36.76	12.07
Mendota	Fresno	727	72.92	248	24.87	2	0.2	8	0.8	12	1.2	997	479	48.05	15.43
Orange Cove	Fresno	553	73.25	172	22.78	1	0.13	9	1.19	20	2.65	755	381	50.47	25.5
Parlier	Fresno	1269	81.29	223	14.29	8	0.51	21	1.35	40	2.56	1561	1046	67	24.01
Reedley	Fresno	2267	43.26	2827	53.95	25	0.48	46	0.88	75	1.43	5240	-560	-10.69	10.96
San Joaquin	Fresno	224	72.03	66	21.22	4	1.29	6	1.93	11	3.54	311	158	50.81	11.38
Sanger	Fresno	2693	61.39	1586	36.15	14	0.32	32	0.73	62	1.41	4387	1107	25.24	17.07
Selma	Fresno	2630	53.83	2089	42.75	21	0.43	68	1.39	78	1.6	4886	541	11.08	15.04
Unincorporated area of Fresno County	Fresno	21317	36.53	35608	61.02	227	0.39	497	0.85	708	1.21	58357	-14291	-24.49	7.35
Orland	Glenn	739	38.67	1064	55.68	33	1.73	28	1.47	47	2.46	1911	-325	-17.01	8.67
Unincorporated area of Glenn County	Glenn	1652	30.61	3529	65.39	47	0.87	76	1.41	93	1.72	5397	-1877	-34.78	5.01
Willows	Glenn	756	38.12	1146	57.79	14	0.71	34	1.71	33	1.66	1983	-390	-19.67	11.76
Arcata	Humboldt	7497	74.14	1517	15	91	0.9	314	3.11	693	6.85	10112	5980	59.14	-3.41
Blue Lake	Humboldt	443	63.11	210	29.91	10	1.42	12	1.71	27	3.85	702	233	33.2	6.57
Eureka	Humboldt	6964	59.67	3965	33.98	100	0.86	290	2.49	351	3.01	11670	2999	25.69	7.05
Ferndale	Humboldt	374	46.23	405	50.06	2	0.25	12	1.48	16	1.98	809	-31	-3.83	9.7
Fortuna	Humboldt	6263	48.7	5954	46.3	126	0.98	257	2	260	2.02	12860	309	2.4	8.81
Rio Dell	Humboldt	545	44.56	602	49.22	21	1.72	23	1.88	32	2.62	1223	-57	-4.66	18.13
Trinidad	Humboldt	180	69.5	63	24.32	3	1.16	4	1.54	9	3.47	259	117	45.18	-0.07
Unincorporated area of Humboldt County	Humboldt	15750	58.19	9678	35.76	204	0.75	575	2.12	858	3.17	27065	6072	22.43	5.8
Brawley	Imperial	2560	60.38	1465	34.55	31	0.73	64	1.51	120	2.83	4240	1095	25.83	19.72
Calexico	Imperial	3486	75.28	707	15.27	63	1.36	125	2.7	250	5.4	4631	2779	60.01	11.79
Calipatria	Imperial	301	60.81	158	31.92	2	0.4	12	2.42	22	4.44	495	143	28.89	26.76
El Centro	Imperial	4276	58.79	2518	34.62	69	0.95	156	2.14	254	3.49	7273	1758	24.17	15.91
Holtville	Imperial	518	54.76	368	38.9	9	0.95	18	1.9	33	3.49	946	150	15.86	15.86
Imperial	Imperial	1052	51.37	877	42.82	21	1.03	45	2.2	53	2.59	2048	175	8.55	25.16
Unapportioned absentees of Imperial County (2000)	Imperial	4503	54.97	3293	40.2	47	0.57	128	1.56	220	2.69	8191	1210	14.77	14.96
Unincorporated area of Imperial County	Imperial	2579	45.7	2704	47.92	48	0.85	125	2.22	187	3.31	5643	-125	-2.22	10.98
Westmoreland	Imperial	223	62.64	105	29.49	3	0.84	5	1.4	20	5.62	356	118	33.15	25.97
Bishop	Inyo	660	44.69	740	50.1	17	1.15	31	2.1	29	1.96	1477	-80	-5.41	7.69
Unincorporated area of Inyo County	Inyo	2814	39.85	3903	55.27	61	0.86	135	1.91	149	2.11	7062	-1089	-15.42	6.32
Arvin	Kern	1294	69.01	459	24.48	13	0.69	44	2.35	65	3.47	1875	835	44.53	21.05
Bakersfield	Kern	34792	38.4	51735	57.1	619	0.68	1639	1.81	1814	2	90599	-16943	-18.7	13.7
California City	Kern	1225	37.77	1782	54.95	48	1.48	97	2.99	91	2.81	3243	-557	-17.18	24.34
Delano	Kern	4108	68.4	1566	26.07	33	0.55	105	1.75	194	3.23	6006	2542	42.33	18.18
Maricopa	Kern	96	27.35	222	63.25	9	2.56	13	3.7	11	3.13	351	-126	-35.9	24.21
McFarland	Kern	921	68.37	337	25.02	7	0.52	27	2	55	4.08	1347	584	43.35	17.49
Ridgecrest	Kern	3630	33.51	6603	60.96	112	1.03	290	2.68	196	1.81	10831	-2973	-27.45	18.19
Shafter	Kern	1233	45.82	1351	50.2	11	0.41	36	1.34	60	2.23	2691	-118	-4.38	17.54
Taft	Kern	604	26.03	1578	68.02	22	0.95	63	2.72	53	2.28	2320	-974	-41.99	18.48
Tehachapi	Kern	981	38.01	1457	56.45	35	1.36	50	1.94	58	2.25	2581	-476	-18.44	17.81
Unincorporated area of Kern County	Kern	29189	34.64	50542	59.97	775	0.92	1905	2.26	1864	2.21	84275	-21353	-25.33	15.29
Wasco	Kern	1696	54.73	1250	40.34	26	0.84	45	1.45	82	2.65	3099	446	14.39	20.32
Avenal	Kings	513	59.51	299	34.69	9	1.04	14	1.62	27	3.13	862	214	24.82	21.47
Corcoran	Kings	1262	59.22	784	36.79	11	0.52	35	1.64	39	1.83	2131	478	22.43	24.29
Hanford	Kings	6063	42.41	7799	54.55	65	0.45	151	1.06	219	1.53	14297	-1736	-12.14	18.86
Lemoore	Kings	2471	40.75	3379	55.72	33	0.54	62	1.02	119	1.96	6064	-908	-14.97	23.81
Unincorporated area of Kings County	Kings	3176	38.62	4814	58.54	30	0.36	68	0.83	135	1.64	8223	-1638	-19.92	18.99
Clearlake	Lake	2608	66.65	1106	28.26	40	1.02	60	1.53	99	2.53	3913	1502	38.39	13.17
Lakeport	Lake	1156	54.71	869	41.13	19	0.9	20	0.95	49	2.32	2113	287	13.58	12.07
Unincorporated area of Lake County	Lake	10048	54.32	7644	41.32	157	0.85	329	1.78	321	1.74	18499	2404	13	7.51
Susanville	Lassen	1298	35.49	2154	58.9	52	1.42	72	1.97	81	2.21	3657	-856	-23.41	14.02
Unincorporated area of Lassen County	Lassen	2357	30.86	4897	64.11	95	1.24	147	1.92	142	1.86	7638	-2540	-33.25	13.09
Agoura Hills	Los Angeles	4424	57.2	3002	38.82	41	0.53	137	1.77	130	1.68	7734	1422	18.38	11.89
Alhambra	Los Angeles	15685	68.57	5953	26.03	156	0.68	402	1.76	677	2.96	22873	9732	42.54	13.49
Arcadia	Los Angeles	19538	46.4	20934	49.72	298	0.71	673	1.6	665	1.58	42108	-1396	-3.32	9.06
Artesia	Los Angeles	6169	55.7	4378	39.53	91	0.82	214	1.93	223	2.01	11075	1791	16.17	12.1
Avalon	Los Angeles	7482	49.78	6837	45.49	93	0.62	384	2.55	234	1.56	15030	645	4.29	6.13
Azusa	Los Angeles	9008	62.74	4513	31.43	135	0.94	291	2.03	411	2.86	14358	4495	31.31	18.68
Baldwin Park	Los Angeles	9436	77.34	1975	16.19	120	0.98	235	1.93	435	3.57	12201	7461	61.15	19.24
Bell	Los Angeles	4584	81.2	818	14.49	42	0.74	69	1.22	132	2.34	5645	3766	66.71	13.84
Bell Gardens	Los Angeles	4413	83.95	570	10.84	41	0.78	71	1.35	162	3.08	5257	3843	73.11	15.66
Bellflower	Los Angeles	11727	63.03	5900	31.71	116	0.62	362	1.95	499	2.68	18604	5827	31.32	17.77
Beverly Hills	Los Angeles	14988	72.73	4972	24.13	116	0.56	278	1.35	254	1.23	20608	10016	48.6	23.55
Burbank	Los Angeles	33144	59.27	19918	35.62	372	0.67	1233	2.21	1250	2.24	55917	13226	23.65	8.66
Calabasas	Los Angeles	4700	62.38	2545	33.78	43	0.57	124	1.65	122	1.62	7534	2155	28.6	12.9
Carson	Los Angeles	24641	78.23	5516	17.51	185	0.59	459	1.46	699	2.22	31500	19125	60.72	17.91
Cerritos	Los Angeles	8311	57.5	5455	37.74	95	0.66	308	2.13	284	1.96	14453	2856	19.76	14.91
Claremont	Los Angeles	7864	61.12	4409	34.27	59	0.46	229	1.78	305	2.37	12866	3455	26.85	7.45
Commerce	Los Angeles	2992	85.63	358	10.25	22	0.63	37	1.06	85	2.43	3494	2634	75.38	16.41
Compton	Los Angeles	18536	90.63	985	4.82	170	0.83	244	1.19	518	2.53	20453	17551	85.81	3.94
Covina	Los Angeles	8576	53.73	6534	40.94	138	0.86	312	1.95	401	2.51	15961	2042	12.79	16.14
Cudahy	Los Angeles	2383	83.32	367	12.83	16	0.56	23	0.8	71	2.48	2860	2016	70.49	16.6
Culver City	Los Angeles	15889	75.61	4154	19.77	142	0.68	382	1.82	448	2.13	21015	11735	55.84	5.5
Diamond Bar	Los Angeles	11840	53.67	9242	41.89	134	0.61	426	1.93	418	1.89	22060	2598	11.78	14.86
Downey	Los Angeles	19363	60.08	11094	34.42	248	0.77	708	2.2	815	2.53	32228	8269	25.66	15.25
Duarte	Los Angeles	4676	62.28	2465	32.83	60	0.8	116	1.55	191	2.54	7508	2211	29.45	11.75
El Monte	Los Angeles	12208	75.05	3121	19.19	114	0.7	265	1.63	559	3.44	16267	9087	55.86	20.19
El Segundo	Los Angeles	4071	49.71	3633	44.36	55	0.67	271	3.31	160	1.95	8190	438	5.35	13.41
Gardena	Los Angeles	12425	73.92	3542	21.07	135	0.8	304	1.81	402	2.39	16808	8883	52.85	12.14
Glendale	Los Angeles	26161	60.82	14490	33.69	286	0.66	1116	2.59	958	2.23	43011	11671	27.13	8.46
Glendora	Los Angeles	7562	42.87	9124	51.73	146	0.83	362	2.05	445	2.52	17639	-1562	-8.86	17.64
Hawaiian Gardens	Los Angeles	1219	70.18	386	22.22	20	1.15	53	3.05	59	3.4	1737	833	47.96	14.13
Hawthorne	Los Angeles	14393	74.69	3827	19.86	150	0.78	371	1.93	529	2.75	19270	10566	54.83	8.37
Hermosa Beach	Los Angeles	14564	54.37	11053	41.26	124	0.46	642	2.4	403	1.5	26786	3511	13.11	6
Hidden Hills	Los Angeles	426	52.14	363	44.43	3	0.37	14	1.71	11	1.35	817	63	7.71	13.64
Huntington Park	Los Angeles	6796	82.21	1056	12.77	62	0.75	119	1.44	234	2.83	8267	5740	69.44	9.91
Inglewood	Los Angeles	27929	88.92	2224	7.08	161	0.51	395	1.26	700	2.23	31409	25705	81.84	4.27
Irwindale	Los Angeles	293	77.72	62	16.45	5	1.33	7	1.86	10	2.65	377	231	61.27	21.27
La Canada Flintridge	Los Angeles	3275	45.85	3617	50.64	43	0.6	115	1.61	93	1.3	7143	-342	-4.79	5.48
La Habra Heights	Los Angeles	1116	34.82	1982	61.84	18	0.56	54	1.68	35	1.09	3205	-866	-27.02	9.5
La Mirada	Los Angeles	8976	47.26	9284	48.88	97	0.51	299	1.57	338	1.78	18994	-308	-1.62	15.48
La Puente	Los Angeles	5597	76.63	1181	16.17	98	1.34	149	2.04	279	3.82	7304	4416	60.46	16.68
La Verne	Los Angeles	5585	47.72	5565	47.55	71	0.61	210	1.79	272	2.32	11703	20	0.17	17.66
Lakewood	Los Angeles	17201	55.1	12374	39.64	222	0.71	773	2.48	646	2.07	31216	4827	15.46	16.12
Lancaster	Los Angeles	14129	46.02	14722	47.95	290	0.94	620	2.02	939	3.06	30700	-593	-1.93	18.74
Lawndale	Los Angeles	4004	69.31	1400	24.23	61	1.06	132	2.28	180	3.12	5777	2604	45.08	13.2
Lomita	Los Angeles	3191	54.66	2243	38.42	50	0.86	193	3.31	161	2.76	5838	948	16.24	13.54
Long Beach	Los Angeles	77371	66.73	31069	26.79	912	0.79	3110	2.68	3489	3.01	115951	46302	39.94	9.71
Los Angeles	Los Angeles	786428	74.12	223158	21.03	7091	0.67	19018	1.79	25291	2.38	1060986	563270	53.09	9.08
Lynwood	Los Angeles	9443	86.89	958	8.81	67	0.62	136	1.25	264	2.43	10868	8485	78.08	9.96
Malibu	Los Angeles	4708	59.18	2973	37.37	37	0.47	121	1.52	116	1.46	7955	1735	21.81	1.07
Manhattan Beach	Los Angeles	7401	52.73	6000	42.75	57	0.41	388	2.76	189	1.35	14035	1401	9.98	5.4
Maywood	Los Angeles	2898	84.76	351	10.27	33	0.97	46	1.35	91	2.66	3419	2547	74.49	9.88
Monrovia	Los Angeles	6030	57.52	3930	37.49	50	0.48	199	1.9	274	2.61	10483	2100	20.03	11.83
Montebello	Los Angeles	12676	74.65	3334	19.63	138	0.81	361	2.13	471	2.77	16980	9342	55.02	13.94
Monterey Park	Los Angeles	12342	68.88	4632	25.85	114	0.64	290	1.62	541	3.02	17919	7710	43.03	16.13
Norwalk	Los Angeles	17278	67.54	6781	26.51	218	0.85	513	2.01	791	3.09	25581	10497	41.03	17.45
Palmdale	Los Angeles	15105	54.74	10803	39.15	265	0.96	605	2.19	816	2.96	27594	4302	15.59	17.94
Palos Verdes Estates	Los Angeles	2075	39.61	3018	57.62	24	0.46	66	1.26	55	1.05	5238	-943	-18.01	4.25
Paramount	Los Angeles	6969	76.79	1527	16.83	111	1.22	163	1.8	305	3.36	9075	5442	59.96	12.31
Pasadena	Los Angeles	26566	69.25	10055	26.21	196	0.51	596	1.55	947	2.47	38360	16511	43.04	4.94
Pico Rivera	Los Angeles	14224	76.73	3181	17.16	150	0.81	415	2.24	567	3.06	18537	11043	59.57	16.16
Pomona	Los Angeles	21267	69.6	7609	24.9	227	0.74	547	1.79	904	2.96	30554	13658	44.7	14.59
Rancho Palos Verdes	Los Angeles	6944	47.64	7074	48.53	74	0.51	274	1.88	210	1.44	14576	-130	-0.89	6.79
Redondo Beach	Los Angeles	13158	57.18	8408	36.54	166	0.72	723	3.14	557	2.42	23012	4750	20.64	10.96
Rolling Hills	Los Angeles	221	29.43	497	66.18	6	0.8	17	2.26	10	1.33	751	-276	-36.75	5.06
Rolling Hills Estates	Los Angeles	1353	42.02	1754	54.47	13	0.4	64	1.99	36	1.12	3220	-401	-12.45	8.22
Rosemead	Los Angeles	6074	73.7	1663	20.18	68	0.83	147	1.78	290	3.52	8242	4411	53.52	19.51
San Dimas	Los Angeles	5760	46.88	5913	48.12	95	0.77	213	1.73	306	2.49	12287	-153	-1.24	16.93
San Fernando	Los Angeles	3725	75.67	873	17.73	31	0.63	74	1.5	220	4.47	4923	2852	57.94	14.07
San Gabriel	Los Angeles	4358	64.35	2058	30.39	36	0.53	134	1.98	186	2.75	6772	2300	33.96	16.13
San Marino	Los Angeles	2365	38.17	3664	59.13	17	0.27	79	1.28	71	1.15	6196	-1299	-20.96	4.4
Santa Clarita	Los Angeles	27901	44.83	31485	50.59	402	0.65	1325	2.13	1128	1.81	62241	-3584	-5.76	14.67
Santa Fe Springs	Los Angeles	3791	69.74	1341	24.67	60	1.1	116	2.13	128	2.35	5436	2450	45.07	18.64
Santa Monica	Los Angeles	34746	74.12	10074	21.49	289	0.62	867	1.85	902	1.92	46878	24672	52.63	1.25
Sierra Madre	Los Angeles	2536	52.89	2040	42.54	28	0.58	77	1.61	114	2.38	4795	496	10.35	4.64
Signal Hill	Los Angeles	1882	65.9	764	26.75	22	0.77	95	3.33	93	3.26	2856	1118	39.15	10.42
South El Monte	Los Angeles	2697	80.75	443	13.26	29	0.87	36	1.08	135	4.04	3340	2254	67.49	19.27
South Gate	Los Angeles	13782	81.87	2353	13.98	111	0.66	168	1	421	2.5	16835	11429	67.89	13.35
South Pasadena	Los Angeles	7523	63.88	3752	31.86	64	0.54	191	1.62	247	2.1	11777	3771	32.02	5.17
Temple City	Los Angeles	5093	56.54	3450	38.3	64	0.71	138	1.53	262	2.91	9007	1643	18.24	15.3
Torrance	Los Angeles	29716	51.4	25253	43.68	353	0.61	1457	2.52	1037	1.79	57816	4463	7.72	14.63
Unincorporated Area of Los Angeles County	Los Angeles	231652	61.87	124865	33.35	2916	0.78	6572	1.76	8432	2.25	374437	106787	28.52	11.35
Vernon	Los Angeles	18	62.07	10	34.48	0	0	1	3.45	0	0	29	8	27.59	27.59
Walnut	Los Angeles	6263	57.65	4146	38.16	54	0.5	166	1.53	235	2.16	10864	2117	19.49	16.34
West Covina	Los Angeles	15834	62.94	7753	30.82	241	0.96	579	2.3	749	2.98	25156	8081	32.12	17.44
West Hollywood	Los Angeles	11978	84.85	1537	10.89	99	0.7	229	1.62	274	1.94	14117	10441	73.96	7.97
Westlake Village	Los Angeles	1660	48.92	1604	47.27	19	0.56	58	1.71	52	1.53	3393	56	1.65	7.88
Whittier	Los Angeles	15192	52.88	12055	41.96	213	0.74	575	2	695	2.42	28730	3137	10.92	11.15
Chowchilla	Madera	843	37.38	1339	59.38	11	0.49	24	1.06	38	1.69	2255	-496	-22	14.7
Madera	Madera	4895	51.73	4204	44.43	50	0.53	80	0.85	233	2.46	9462	691	7.3	17.59
Unincorporated area of Madera County	Madera	9320	34.84	16706	62.45	143	0.53	211	0.79	370	1.38	26750	-7386	-27.61	7.92
Belvedere	Marin	705	50.94	647	46.75	4	0.29	23	1.66	5	0.36	1384	58	4.19	-12.25
Corte Madera	Marin	3837	73.25	1233	23.54	25	0.48	81	1.55	62	1.18	5238	2604	49.71	-3.89
Fairfax	Marin	3933	83.49	576	12.23	22	0.47	76	1.61	104	2.21	4711	3357	71.26	-2.83
Larkspur	Marin	5266	71.76	1838	25.05	24	0.33	108	1.47	102	1.39	7338	3428	46.71	-3.36
Mill Valley	Marin	6730	77.97	1634	18.93	24	0.28	118	1.37	126	1.46	8632	5096	59.04	-5.76
Novato	Marin	15102	63.09	7965	33.27	118	0.49	379	1.58	375	1.57	23939	7137	29.82	-0.06
Ross	Marin	841	57.96	572	39.42	4	0.28	26	1.79	8	0.55	1451	269	18.54	-8.97
San Anselmo	Marin	6028	80.57	1226	16.39	25	0.33	109	1.46	94	1.26	7482	4802	64.18	-2.85
San Rafael	Marin	18020	71.04	6457	25.45	108	0.43	391	1.54	391	1.54	25367	11563	45.59	-2.44
Sausalito	Marin	3428	73.15	1102	23.52	15	0.32	80	1.71	61	1.3	4686	2326	49.63	-5.48
Tiburon	Marin	3432	63.72	1838	34.13	10	0.19	58	1.08	48	0.89	5386	1594	29.59	-5.3
Unincorporated area of Marin County	Marin	26842	72.02	9213	24.72	127	0.34	550	1.48	539	1.45	37271	17629	47.3	-2.94
Unincorporated area of Mariposa County	Mariposa	3437	40.38	4751	55.82	66	0.78	113	1.33	144	1.69	8511	-1314	-15.44	7.3
Fort Bragg	Mendocino	1825	66.78	676	24.73	23	0.84	137	5.01	72	2.63	2733	1149	42.05	3.01
Point Arena	Mendocino	137	74.86	27	14.75	1	0.55	10	5.46	8	4.37	183	110	60.11	0.73
Ukiah	Mendocino	3599	61.55	1836	31.4	44	0.75	220	3.76	148	2.53	5847	1763	30.15	8.67
Unincorporated area of Mendocino County	Mendocino	16822	61.41	8115	29.63	215	0.78	1489	5.44	750	2.74	27391	8707	31.78	0.95
Willits	Mendocino	1032	61.07	477	28.22	19	1.12	96	5.68	66	3.91	1690	555	32.85	6.11
Atwater	Merced	3129	46.93	3244	48.65	66	0.99	96	1.44	133	1.99	6668	-115	-1.72	19.32
Dos Palos	Merced	552	46.9	585	49.7	8	0.68	14	1.19	18	1.53	1177	-33	-2.8	15
Gustine	Merced	867	56.19	620	40.18	8	0.52	21	1.36	27	1.75	1543	247	16.01	19.12
Livingston	Merced	1238	73.65	334	19.87	24	1.43	32	1.9	53	3.15	1681	904	53.78	18.49
Los Banos	Merced	4141	57.18	2759	38.1	71	0.98	112	1.55	159	2.2	7242	1382	19.08	18.11
Merced	Merced	9300	53.06	7454	42.53	159	0.91	260	1.48	355	2.03	17528	1846	10.53	19.07
Unincorporated area of Merced County	Merced	8748	42.66	11027	53.77	158	0.77	222	1.08	353	1.72	20508	-2279	-11.11	16.01
Alturas	Modoc	429	35.4	706	58.25	20	1.65	32	2.64	25	2.06	1212	-277	-22.85	9.26
Unincorporated area of Modoc County	Modoc	824	25.85	2210	69.32	33	1.04	79	2.48	42	1.32	3188	-1386	-43.47	9.09
Mammoth Lakes	Mono	1464	57.55	916	36.01	26	1.02	67	2.63	71	2.79	2544	548	21.54	4.7
Unincorporated area of Mono County	Mono	1128	42.65	1398	52.85	24	0.91	55	2.08	40	1.51	2645	-270	-10.2	6.09
Carmel-by-the-Sea	Monterey	1539	57.32	1060	39.48	5	0.19	45	1.68	36	1.34	2685	479	17.84	-2.62
Del Rey Oaks	Monterey	593	63.69	283	30.4	12	1.29	24	2.58	19	2.04	931	310	33.29	6.39
Gonzales	Monterey	1250	73.44	358	21.03	15	0.88	30	1.76	49	2.88	1702	892	52.41	13.31
Greenfield	Monterey	1417	76.39	351	18.92	12	0.65	42	2.26	33	1.78	1855	1066	57.47	11.99
King City	Monterey	1074	60.27	620	34.79	12	0.67	36	2.02	40	2.24	1782	454	25.48	11.34
Marina	Monterey	4297	63.98	1990	29.63	75	1.12	186	2.77	168	2.5	6716	2307	34.35	11.79
Monterey	Monterey	7743	64.74	3554	29.71	114	0.95	312	2.61	238	1.99	11961	4189	35.03	2.83
Pacific Grove	Monterey	5794	68.25	2293	27.01	69	0.81	198	2.33	135	1.59	8489	3501	41.24	2.08
Salinas	Monterey	21501	66.02	9459	29.05	231	0.71	710	2.18	664	2.04	32565	12042	36.97	13.52
Sand City	Monterey	44	53.66	31	37.8	3	3.66	3	3.66	1	1.22	82	13	15.86	5.52
Seaside	Monterey	5683	70.33	1927	23.85	78	0.97	206	2.55	187	2.31	8081	3756	46.48	8.98
Soledad	Monterey	1939	75.16	540	20.93	12	0.47	40	1.55	49	1.9	2580	1399	54.23	15.87
Unincorporated area of Monterey County	Monterey	23623	54.45	18045	41.59	315	0.73	766	1.77	636	1.47	43385	5578	12.86	3.66
American Canyon	Napa	2265	68.45	886	26.78	33	1	54	1.63	71	2.15	3309	1379	41.67	10.67
Calistoga	Napa	771	70.15	276	25.11	7	0.64	23	2.09	22	2	1099	495	45.04	3.95
Napa	Napa	11543	62.53	6174	33.45	128	0.69	301	1.63	314	1.7	18460	5369	29.08	4.45
St. Helena	Napa	1096	65.59	516	30.88	8	0.48	25	1.5	26	1.56	1671	580	34.71	1.46
Unapportioned absentees of Napa County (2000)	Napa	12683	59.44	7999	37.49	101	0.47	273	1.28	281	1.32	21337	4684	21.95	3.19
Unincorporated area of Napa County	Napa	4612	51.8	3909	43.9	65	0.73	167	1.88	151	1.7	8904	703	7.9	1.52
Yountville	Napa	607	67.37	252	27.97	7	0.78	16	1.78	19	2.11	901	355	39.4	7.35
Grass Valley	Nevada	2609	49.1	2386	44.9	66	1.24	126	2.37	127	2.39	5314	223	4.2	9.88
Nevada City	Nevada	1092	61.87	581	32.92	17	0.96	37	2.1	38	2.15	1765	511	28.95	2.58
Truckee	Nevada	3897	56.98	2530	36.99	67	0.98	173	2.53	172	2.51	6839	1367	19.99	2.34
Unincorporated area of Nevada County	Nevada	16769	42.67	20824	52.99	303	0.77	729	1.85	676	1.72	39301	-4055	-10.32	4.76
Aliso Viejo	Orange	8330	45.72	8980	49.29	108	0.59	490	2.69	310	1.7	18218	-650	-3.57	14.09
Anaheim	Orange	38814	46.98	39034	47.25	712	0.86	2005	2.43	2048	2.48	82613	-220	-0.27	16.67
Brea	Orange	6423	38.12	9640	57.22	129	0.77	361	2.14	295	1.75	16848	-3217	-19.1	13.11
Buena Park	Orange	10902	49.63	9762	44.44	206	0.94	522	2.38	575	2.62	21967	1140	5.19	15.92
Costa Mesa	Orange	16678	44.73	17737	47.58	295	0.79	1622	4.35	950	2.55	37282	-1059	-2.85	9.79
Cypress	Orange	8772	45.71	9432	49.15	137	0.71	468	2.44	380	1.98	19189	-660	-3.44	16.05
Dana Point	Orange	7027	40.64	9294	53.75	109	0.63	558	3.23	304	1.76	17292	-2267	-13.11	8.08
Fountain Valley	Orange	10196	40.54	13557	53.9	190	0.76	703	2.79	507	2.02	25153	-3361	-13.36	17.46
Fullerton	Orange	19946	43.81	23194	50.94	375	0.82	1075	2.36	942	2.07	45532	-3248	-7.13	11.18
Garden Grove	Orange	23135	49.42	20427	43.63	400	0.85	1630	3.48	1223	2.61	46815	2708	5.79	29.19
Huntington Beach	Orange	37001	41.98	45732	51.89	767	0.87	2922	3.32	1709	1.94	88131	-8731	-9.91	11.18
Irvine	Orange	33494	50.08	30220	45.18	331	0.49	1758	2.63	1084	1.62	66887	3274	4.9	10.53
La Habra	Orange	8171	46.97	8403	48.3	144	0.83	304	1.75	376	2.16	17398	-232	-1.33	15.38
La Palma	Orange	2891	48.01	2875	47.74	48	0.8	114	1.89	94	1.56	6022	16	0.27	15.36
Laguna Beach	Orange	8118	57.53	5266	37.32	48	0.34	506	3.59	172	1.22	14110	2852	20.21	4.72
Laguna Hills	Orange	5319	39.33	7433	54.96	103	0.76	448	3.31	222	1.64	13525	-2114	-15.63	10.94
Laguna Niguel	Orange	12274	40.69	16314	54.09	166	0.55	933	3.09	475	1.57	30162	-4040	-13.4	10
Laguna Woods	Orange	7286	57.75	5066	40.16	53	0.42	137	1.09	74	0.59	12616	2220	17.59	10.62
Lake Forest	Orange	12742	40.41	17374	55.1	229	0.73	700	2.22	488	1.55	31533	-4632	-14.69	14.72
Los Alamitos	Orange	2234	47.15	2229	47.05	40	0.84	144	3.04	91	1.92	4738	5	0.1	12.97
Mission Viejo	Orange	17053	37.52	26356	57.99	309	0.68	1029	2.26	706	1.55	45453	-9303	-20.47	8.82
Newport Beach	Orange	16007	35.12	27287	59.87	206	0.45	1591	3.49	484	1.06	45575	-11280	-24.75	6.76
Orange	Orange	19263	39.84	26658	55.13	358	0.74	1249	2.58	825	1.71	48353	-7395	-15.29	12.63
Placentia	Orange	7835	40.65	10564	54.81	153	0.79	363	1.88	358	1.86	19273	-2729	-14.16	13.17
Rancho Santa Margarita	Orange	7164	35.38	12142	59.97	138	0.68	444	2.19	360	1.78	20248	-4978	-24.59	10.93
San Clemente	Orange	10185	36.69	16131	58.1	179	0.64	765	2.76	503	1.81	27763	-5946	-21.41	8.57
San Juan Capistrano	Orange	5158	37.12	8041	57.87	101	0.73	366	2.63	230	1.66	13896	-2883	-20.75	9.39
Santa Ana	Orange	31848	61.14	16636	31.94	385	0.74	1246	2.39	1975	3.79	52090	15212	29.2	19.48
Seal Beach	Orange	7041	47.91	6967	47.41	115	0.78	374	2.54	199	1.35	14696	74	0.5	10.26
Stanton	Orange	4422	54.92	3109	38.61	66	0.82	248	3.08	207	2.57	8052	1313	16.31	27.98
Tustin	Orange	9787	45.68	10587	49.41	132	0.62	559	2.61	362	1.69	21427	-800	-3.73	13.69
Unincorporated area of Orange County	Orange	18257	35.52	30626	59.59	326	0.63	1457	2.84	726	1.41	51392	-12369	-24.07	10.02
Villa Park	Orange	909	24.75	2654	72.28	13	0.35	64	1.74	32	0.87	3672	-1745	-47.53	6.74
Westminster	Orange	13920	47.33	13504	45.92	304	1.03	1000	3.4	682	2.32	29410	416	1.41	30.87
Yorba Linda	Orange	10002	31.81	20175	64.16	196	0.62	646	2.05	426	1.35	31445	-10173	-32.35	13.02
Auburn	Placer	3211	45.75	3501	49.89	48	0.68	130	1.85	128	1.82	7018	-290	-4.14	7.84
Colfax	Placer	346	44.99	383	49.8	7	0.91	13	1.69	20	2.6	769	-37	-4.81	14.13
Lincoln	Placer	5412	40.77	7511	56.58	62	0.47	152	1.15	138	1.04	13275	-2099	-15.81	10.42
Loomis	Placer	1165	36.06	1935	59.89	27	0.84	51	1.58	53	1.64	3231	-770	-23.83	14.38
Rocklin	Placer	8804	37.63	13806	59.01	114	0.49	319	1.36	353	1.51	23396	-5002	-21.38	10.03
Roseville	Placer	19237	40.91	26301	55.93	196	0.42	645	1.37	647	1.38	47026	-7064	-15.02	11.09
Unincorporated area of Placer County	Placer	21379	38.67	31726	57.39	402	0.73	920	1.66	858	1.55	55285	-10347	-18.72	7.11
Portola	Plumas	423	49.36	367	42.82	15	1.75	32	3.73	20	2.33	857	56	6.54	22.51
Unincorporated area of Plumas County	Plumas	3924	38.76	5652	55.83	105	1.04	219	2.16	223	2.2	10123	-1728	-17.07	8.52
Banning	Riverside	5008	49.11	4867	47.73	79	0.77	88	0.86	155	1.52	10197	141	1.38	15.94
Beaumont	Riverside	2393	46.46	2538	49.27	59	1.15	75	1.46	86	1.67	5151	-145	-2.81	21.5
Blythe	Riverside	1627	51.45	1378	43.58	27	0.85	47	1.49	83	2.62	3162	249	7.87	20.74
Calimesa	Riverside	1422	42.79	1801	54.2	24	0.72	33	0.99	43	1.29	3323	-379	-11.41	16.59
Canyon Lake	Riverside	1595	31.59	3275	64.86	21	0.42	82	1.62	76	1.51	5049	-1680	-33.27	16.96
Cathedral City	Riverside	7494	60.39	4463	35.96	83	0.67	153	1.23	217	1.75	12410	3031	24.43	16.04
Coachella	Riverside	2536	79.92	473	14.91	21	0.66	33	1.04	110	3.47	3173	2063	65.01	15.55
Corona	Riverside	18036	43.02	22171	52.89	289	0.69	627	1.5	799	1.91	41922	-4135	-9.87	12.84
Desert Hot Springs	Riverside	2266	55.55	1586	38.88	34	0.83	81	1.99	112	2.75	4079	680	16.67	16.07
Hemet	Riverside	10801	46.89	11432	49.63	173	0.75	255	1.11	375	1.63	23036	-631	-2.74	19.17
Indian Wells	Riverside	768	29.79	1761	68.31	10	0.39	23	0.89	16	0.62	2578	-993	-38.52	8.32
Indio	Riverside	7001	59.74	4297	36.67	85	0.73	101	0.86	235	2.01	11719	2704	23.07	19.41
La Quinta	Riverside	5104	41.33	6900	55.87	55	0.45	120	0.97	170	1.38	12349	-1796	-14.54	15.83
Lake Elsinore	Riverside	4010	43.89	4646	50.85	100	1.09	168	1.84	212	2.32	9136	-636	-6.96	18.33
Moreno Valley	Riverside	23969	59.87	14364	35.88	287	0.72	474	1.18	941	2.35	40035	9605	23.99	17.83
Murrieta	Riverside	10451	35.14	18266	61.41	216	0.73	338	1.14	474	1.59	29745	-7815	-26.27	13.74
Norco	Riverside	3010	35.35	5153	60.52	87	1.02	138	1.62	127	1.49	8515	-2143	-25.17	16.58
Palm Desert	Riverside	8957	44.84	10406	52.1	97	0.49	221	1.11	293	1.47	19974	-1449	-7.26	14.05
Palm Springs	Riverside	12127	65.98	5696	30.99	99	0.54	214	1.16	245	1.33	18381	6431	34.99	9.63
Perris	Riverside	4929	65.12	2310	30.52	55	0.73	93	1.23	182	2.4	7569	2619	34.6	19.09
Rancho Mirage	Riverside	3768	46.27	4212	51.72	24	0.29	57	0.7	83	1.02	8144	-444	-5.45	10.69
Riverside	Riverside	41975	52.58	34013	42.6	572	0.72	1140	1.43	2134	2.67	79834	7962	9.98	15.34
San Jacinto	Riverside	3656	48.13	3662	48.21	61	0.8	109	1.43	108	1.42	7596	-6	-0.08	21.22
Temecula	Riverside	9719	36.11	16222	60.26	177	0.66	335	1.24	465	1.73	26918	-6503	-24.15	14.53
Unincorporated area of Riverside County	Riverside	66547	43.51	80305	52.51	1272	0.83	2003	1.31	2806	1.83	152933	-13758	-9	15.5
Citrus Heights	Sacramento	14442	45.14	16492	51.54	254	0.79	424	1.33	385	1.2	31997	-2050	-6.4	15.51
Elk Grove	Sacramento	23196	51.31	20710	45.81	304	0.67	467	1.03	534	1.18	45211	2486	5.5	12.77
Folsom	Sacramento	10506	39.59	15327	57.76	173	0.65	308	1.16	222	0.84	26536	-4821	-18.17	9.08
Galt	Sacramento	2968	46.63	3199	50.26	69	1.08	72	1.13	57	0.9	6365	-231	-3.63	20.82
Isleton	Sacramento	226	66.08	104	30.41	2	0.58	5	1.46	5	1.46	342	122	35.67	25.45
Rancho Cordova	Sacramento	9313	54.08	7212	41.88	166	0.96	262	1.52	267	1.55	17220	2101	12.2	16.08
Sacramento	Sacramento	92619	67.2	39519	28.67	881	0.64	1865	1.35	2935	2.13	137819	53100	38.53	8.76
Unincorporated area of Sacramento County	Sacramento	98746	49.43	94421	47.26	1565	0.78	2466	1.23	2590	1.3	199788	4325	2.17	12.29
Hollister	San Benito	6354	62.33	3335	32.72	64	0.63	207	2.03	234	2.3	10194	3019	29.61	11.24
San Juan Bautista	San Benito	443	65.82	199	29.57	4	0.59	13	1.93	14	2.08	673	244	36.25	9.6
Unincorporated area of San Benito County	San Benito	3552	46.3	3831	49.93	46	0.6	128	1.67	115	1.5	7672	-279	-3.63	8.18
Adelanto	San Bernardino	1932	53.27	1465	40.39	54	1.49	79	2.18	97	2.67	3627	467	12.88	18.26
Apple Valley	San Bernardino	8047	36.43	13018	58.93	181	0.82	339	1.53	504	2.28	22089	-4971	-22.5	16.57
Barstow	San Bernardino	2887	53.24	2201	40.59	70	1.29	103	1.9	162	2.99	5423	686	12.65	26.99
Big Bear Lake	San Bernardino	1010	37.45	1591	58.99	15	0.56	39	1.45	42	1.56	2697	-581	-21.54	14.02
Chino	San Bernardino	9521	50.53	8503	45.13	145	0.77	352	1.87	322	1.71	18843	1018	5.4	16.38
Chino Hills	San Bernardino	11716	46.42	12745	50.5	116	0.46	356	1.41	304	1.2	25237	-1029	-4.08	15.42
Colton	San Bernardino	7320	68.13	2868	26.69	83	0.77	195	1.81	278	2.59	10744	4452	41.44	18.29
Fontana	San Bernardino	19562	63.1	9934	32.05	238	0.77	496	1.6	770	2.48	31000	9628	31.05	17.3
Grand Terrace	San Bernardino	2146	48.08	2086	46.74	47	1.05	100	2.24	84	1.88	4463	60	1.34	16.58
Hesperia	San Bernardino	8156	39.57	11278	54.72	189	0.92	384	1.86	604	2.93	20611	-3122	-15.15	20.64
Highland	San Bernardino	6852	51.39	5781	43.36	110	0.82	244	1.83	347	2.6	13334	1071	8.03	18.13
Loma Linda	San Bernardino	2864	47.06	2915	47.9	51	0.84	133	2.19	123	2.02	6086	-51	-0.84	14.29
Montclair	San Bernardino	4601	62.9	2294	31.36	86	1.18	138	1.89	196	2.68	7315	2307	31.54	18.9
Needles	San Bernardino	708	52.64	545	40.52	18	1.34	39	2.9	35	2.6	1345	163	12.12	19.65
Ontario	San Bernardino	20094	58.04	12890	37.23	253	0.73	570	1.65	811	2.34	34618	7204	20.81	15.71
Rancho Cucamonga	San Bernardino	22931	45.33	25248	49.91	417	0.82	1034	2.04	962	1.9	50592	-2317	-4.58	15.21
Redlands	San Bernardino	12386	46.1	13227	49.23	239	0.89	523	1.95	495	1.84	26870	-841	-3.13	12.61
Rialto	San Bernardino	13640	67.88	5347	26.61	217	1.08	359	1.79	530	2.64	20093	8293	41.27	15.47
San Bernardino	San Bernardino	25725	62.35	13205	32	417	1.01	786	1.9	1127	2.73	41260	12520	30.35	16.74
Twentynine Palms	San Bernardino	1640	43.32	1927	50.9	38	1	86	2.27	95	2.51	3786	-287	-7.58	26.56
Unincorporated area of San Bernardino County	San Bernardino	36875	43.33	43899	51.59	849	1	1613	1.9	1858	2.18	85094	-7024	-8.26	15.4
Upland	San Bernardino	11878	45.57	12986	49.82	192	0.74	532	2.04	479	1.84	26067	-1108	-4.25	12.38
Victorville	San Bernardino	9504	46.68	9957	48.9	202	0.99	310	1.52	389	1.91	20362	-453	-2.22	15.82
Yucaipa	San Bernardino	6991	39.74	9842	55.95	171	0.97	284	1.61	304	1.73	17592	-2851	-16.21	17.37
Yucca Valley	San Bernardino	2790	40.74	3775	55.13	63	0.92	100	1.46	120	1.75	6848	-985	-14.39	18.15
Carlsbad	San Diego	21062	45.49	23534	50.83	228	0.49	685	1.48	789	1.7	46298	-2472	-5.34	9.13
Chula Vista	San Diego	38287	57	25687	38.24	362	0.54	1119	1.67	1713	2.55	67168	12600	18.76	19.92
Coronado	San Diego	3600	40.03	5098	56.69	37	0.41	136	1.51	122	1.36	8993	-1498	-16.66	10.02
Del Mar	San Diego	1593	57.82	1079	39.17	14	0.51	38	1.38	31	1.13	2755	514	18.65	3.98
El Cajon	San Diego	13301	45.24	14519	49.38	265	0.9	619	2.11	697	2.37	29401	-1218	-4.14	19.74
Encinitas	San Diego	17054	55.64	12263	40.01	199	0.65	543	1.77	594	1.94	30653	4791	15.63	5.41
Escondido	San Diego	16828	41.71	21855	54.18	293	0.73	580	1.44	785	1.95	40341	-5027	-12.47	15.28
Imperial Beach	San Diego	3957	56.34	2560	36.45	74	1.05	195	2.78	237	3.37	7023	1397	19.89	20.83
La Mesa	San Diego	13074	53.02	10283	41.7	254	1.03	490	1.99	556	2.25	24657	2791	11.32	13.76
Lemon Grove	San Diego	5113	57.58	3270	36.82	73	0.82	180	2.03	244	2.75	8880	1843	20.76	19.88
National City	San Diego	7164	67.47	2758	25.97	90	0.85	203	1.91	403	3.8	10618	4406	41.5	23.71
Oceanside	San Diego	27731	47.11	28171	47.86	413	0.7	1301	2.21	1250	2.12	58866	-440	-0.75	13.33
Poway	San Diego	9183	39.79	13164	57.04	113	0.49	343	1.49	277	1.2	23080	-3981	-17.25	15.12
San Diego	San Diego	282351	59.36	172320	36.22	2725	0.57	8264	1.74	10037	2.11	475697	110031	23.14	11.99
San Marcos	San Diego	10439	44.43	12033	51.21	177	0.75	357	1.52	492	2.09	23498	-1594	-6.78	14.17
Santee	San Diego	9453	41.84	12001	53.12	172	0.76	504	2.23	462	2.04	22592	-2548	-11.28	23.1
Solana Beach	San Diego	3620	50.94	3251	45.74	31	0.44	102	1.44	103	1.45	7107	369	5.2	4.99
Unincorporated area of San Diego County	San Diego	70244	37.91	107749	58.14	1252	0.68	3044	1.64	3024	1.63	185313	-37505	-20.23	14.05
Vista	San Diego	11403	43.83	13353	51.32	183	0.7	465	1.79	615	2.36	26019	-1950	-7.49	13.5
San Francisco	San Francisco	277193	82.67	43029	12.83	1587	0.47	6269	1.87	7220	2.15	335298	234164	69.84	1.73
Escalon	San Joaquin	1035	39.43	1492	56.84	21	0.8	34	1.3	43	1.64	2625	-457	-17.41	20.33
Lathrop	San Joaquin	1818	61.59	969	32.83	34	1.15	50	1.69	81	2.74	2952	849	28.76	20.09
Lodi	San Joaquin	8682	40.84	11833	55.67	183	0.86	237	1.11	322	1.51	21257	-3151	-14.83	18.32
Manteca	San Joaquin	9147	50.31	8304	45.67	168	0.92	212	1.17	352	1.94	18183	843	4.64	18.23
Ripon	San Joaquin	1542	29.66	3487	67.07	36	0.69	50	0.96	84	1.62	5199	-1945	-37.41	14.52
Stockton	San Joaquin	44763	63.08	23189	32.68	545	0.77	910	1.28	1557	2.19	70964	21574	30.4	17.36
Tracy	San Joaquin	12517	56.44	8664	39.07	184	0.83	358	1.61	453	2.04	22176	3853	17.37	15.24
Unincorporated area of San Joaquin County	San Joaquin	19570	44.92	22412	51.44	329	0.76	570	1.31	690	1.58	43571	-2842	-6.52	17.72
Arroyo Grande	San Luis Obispo	3869	42.81	4770	52.78	68	0.75	167	1.85	163	1.8	9037	-901	-9.97	4.76
Atascadero	San Luis Obispo	5299	40.61	6957	53.31	136	1.04	327	2.51	330	2.53	13049	-1658	-12.7	6.16
El Paso de Robles	San Luis Obispo	4307	39.3	6179	56.38	71	0.65	193	1.76	210	1.92	10960	-1872	-17.08	10.59
Grover Beach	San Luis Obispo	2623	49.63	2318	43.86	46	0.87	145	2.74	153	2.89	5285	305	5.77	8.07
Morro Bay	San Luis Obispo	3238	54.66	2355	39.75	55	0.93	143	2.41	133	2.25	5924	883	14.91	3.33
Pismo Beach	San Luis Obispo	2249	45.66	2463	50	36	0.73	92	1.87	86	1.75	4926	-214	-4.34	1.75
San Luis Obispo	San Luis Obispo	13393	58.43	8155	35.58	183	0.8	579	2.53	612	2.67	22922	5238	22.85	2.44
Unincorporated area of San Luis Obispo County	San Luis Obispo	23234	43.74	27511	51.79	347	0.65	1058	1.99	972	1.83	53122	-4277	-8.05	5.64
Atherton	San Mateo	1924	45.68	2192	52.04	11	0.26	62	1.47	23	0.55	4212	-268	-6.36	-4.09
Belmont	San Mateo	8446	69.6	3293	27.14	53	0.44	191	1.57	152	1.25	12135	5153	42.46	2.08
Brisbane	San Mateo	1500	79.32	310	16.39	7	0.37	42	2.22	32	1.69	1891	1190	62.93	2.93
Burlingame	San Mateo	8602	66.73	3861	29.95	46	0.36	210	1.63	172	1.33	12891	4741	36.78	1.52
Colma	San Mateo	376	82.28	68	14.88	3	0.66	5	1.09	5	1.09	457	308	67.4	9.34
Daly City	San Mateo	21451	78.65	4948	18.14	115	0.42	290	1.06	470	1.72	27274	16503	60.51	9.38
East Palo Alto	San Mateo	4651	89.67	367	7.08	27	0.52	45	0.87	97	1.87	5187	4284	82.59	4.33
Foster City	San Mateo	8429	68.31	3542	28.7	41	0.33	177	1.43	151	1.22	12340	4887	39.61	4.9
Half Moon Bay	San Mateo	3536	65.66	1690	31.38	23	0.43	78	1.45	58	1.08	5385	1846	34.28	2.27
Hillsborough	San Mateo	2683	46.39	2955	51.1	18	0.31	84	1.45	43	0.74	5783	-272	-4.71	-0.07
Menlo Park	San Mateo	10410	69.59	4120	27.54	50	0.33	242	1.62	136	0.91	14958	6290	42.05	-1.69
Millbrae	San Mateo	5742	66.24	2648	30.55	36	0.42	117	1.35	126	1.45	8669	3094	35.69	6.3
Pacifica	San Mateo	13458	75.27	3766	21.06	82	0.46	282	1.58	292	1.63	17880	9692	54.21	6.07
Portola Valley	San Mateo	1695	59.2	1103	38.53	2	0.07	52	1.82	11	0.38	2863	592	20.67	-6.36
Redwood City	San Mateo	19771	69.8	7617	26.89	155	0.55	426	1.5	357	1.26	28326	12154	42.91	4.71
San Bruno	San Mateo	10834	73.89	3305	22.54	83	0.57	204	1.39	237	1.62	14663	7529	51.35	6.74
San Carlos	San Mateo	10076	66.19	4723	31.03	56	0.37	233	1.53	134	0.88	15222	5353	35.16	1.13
San Mateo	San Mateo	26260	69.67	10234	27.15	131	0.35	513	1.36	554	1.47	37692	16026	42.52	3.42
South San Francisco	San Mateo	15449	77.37	3882	19.44	83	0.42	232	1.16	322	1.61	19968	11567	57.93	9.4
Unincorporated area of San Mateo County	San Mateo	19252	70.81	7066	25.99	100	0.37	449	1.65	320	1.18	27187	12186	44.82	0.99
Woodside	San Mateo	1740	52.55	1481	44.73	10	0.3	57	1.72	23	0.69	3311	259	7.82	-5.05
Buellton	Santa Barbara	925	45.01	1065	51.82	5	0.24	38	1.85	22	1.07	2055	-140	-6.81	10.36
Carpinteria	Santa Barbara	3396	60.66	1923	34.35	36	0.64	107	1.91	136	2.43	5598	1473	26.31	6.36
Goleta	Santa Barbara	8213	60.33	4837	35.53	69	0.51	258	1.9	237	1.74	13614	3376	24.8	6.12
Guadalupe	Santa Barbara	922	65.72	341	24.31	13	0.93	78	5.56	49	3.49	1403	581	41.41	20.9
Lompoc	Santa Barbara	5619	47.88	5263	44.84	109	0.93	418	3.56	327	2.79	11736	356	3.04	18.57
Santa Barbara	Santa Barbara	27623	69.04	10596	26.48	208	0.52	762	1.9	823	2.06	40012	17027	42.56	2.08
Santa Maria	Santa Barbara	9736	46.36	9941	47.33	146	0.7	656	3.12	524	2.49	21003	-205	-0.97	15.73
Solvang	Santa Barbara	1097	40.64	1529	56.65	13	0.48	34	1.26	26	0.96	2699	-432	-16.01	4.77
Unincorporated area of Santa Barbara County	Santa Barbara	33524	49.93	30651	45.65	328	0.49	1439	2.14	1203	1.79	67145	2873	4.28	5.41
Campbell	Santa Clara	9536	64.33	4550	30.69	99	0.67	346	2.33	293	1.98	14824	4986	33.64	6.13
Cupertino	Santa Clara	13063	65.28	6143	30.7	110	0.55	401	2	294	1.47	20011	6920	34.58	2.5
Gilroy	Santa Clara	8227	62.99	4265	32.65	92	0.7	235	1.8	242	1.85	13061	3962	30.34	8.92
Los Altos	Santa Clara	9701	60.59	5870	36.66	50	0.31	252	1.57	139	0.87	16012	3831	23.93	-1.38
Los Altos Hills	Santa Clara	2509	53.28	2086	44.3	10	0.21	72	1.53	32	0.68	4709	423	8.98	-3.12
Los Gatos	Santa Clara	8788	58.83	5660	37.89	63	0.42	269	1.8	159	1.06	14939	3128	20.94	0.64
Milpitas	Santa Clara	11787	67.26	5082	29	84	0.48	268	1.53	304	1.73	17525	6705	38.26	15.24
Monte Sereno	Santa Clara	971	50.73	906	47.34	5	0.26	24	1.25	8	0.42	1914	65	3.39	-2.32
Morgan Hill	Santa Clara	7295	55.61	5296	40.37	120	0.91	203	1.55	204	1.56	13118	1999	15.24	7.35
Mountain View	Santa Clara	19518	72.95	6084	22.74	143	0.53	636	2.38	373	1.39	26754	13434	50.21	2.49
Palo Alto	Santa Clara	23851	76.43	6454	20.68	82	0.26	518	1.66	301	0.96	31206	17397	55.75	-0.99
San Jose	Santa Clara	182200	66.61	79296	28.99	1693	0.62	5199	1.9	5160	1.89	273548	102904	37.62	10
Santa Clara	Santa Clara	22574	67.57	9155	27.4	247	0.74	811	2.43	620	1.86	33407	13419	40.17	6.06
Saratoga	Santa Clara	8465	54.76	6508	42.1	57	0.37	219	1.42	208	1.35	15457	1957	12.66	1.28
Sunnyvale	Santa Clara	29204	67.86	11928	27.72	249	0.58	987	2.29	668	1.55	43036	17276	40.14	4.71
Unincorporated area of Santa Clara County	Santa Clara	22862	61.67	12725	34.32	224	0.6	718	1.94	545	1.47	37074	10137	27.35	3.17
Capitola	Santa Cruz	3552	70.31	1213	24.01	53	1.05	116	2.3	118	2.34	5052	2339	46.3	-1.67
Santa Cruz	Santa Cruz	24947	79.6	4193	13.38	279	0.89	727	2.32	1193	3.81	31339	20754	66.22	-3.33
Scotts Valley	Santa Cruz	3398	55.86	2419	39.77	46	0.76	114	1.87	106	1.74	6083	979	16.09	0.24
Unincorporated area of Santa Cruz County	Santa Cruz	45430	67.22	18254	27.01	553	0.82	1698	2.51	1654	2.45	67589	27176	40.21	-1.35
Watsonville	Santa Cruz	7513	74.12	2160	21.31	64	0.63	141	1.39	258	2.55	10136	5353	52.81	6.24
Anderson	Shasta	1235	42.28	1524	52.17	29	0.99	67	2.29	66	2.26	2921	-289	-9.89	16.12
Redding	Shasta	13369	36.32	21748	59.08	345	0.94	662	1.8	686	1.86	36810	-8379	-22.76	11.05
Shasta Lake	Shasta	1553	40.98	2002	52.82	45	1.19	81	2.14	109	2.88	3790	-449	-11.84	13.93
Unincorporated area of Shasta County	Shasta	10638	32.65	20393	62.58	353	1.08	650	1.99	551	1.69	32585	-9755	-29.93	10.61
Loyalton	Sierra	133	35.47	223	59.47	5	1.33	7	1.87	7	1.87	375	-90	-24	15.35
Unincorporated area of Sierra County	Sierra	546	34.75	920	58.56	18	1.15	57	3.63	30	1.91	1571	-374	-23.81	5.22
Dorris	Siskiyou	90	31.8	174	61.48	3	1.06	9	3.18	7	2.47	283	-84	-29.68	17.72
Dunsmuir	Siskiyou	496	59.83	270	32.57	13	1.57	33	3.98	17	2.05	829	226	27.26	9.68
Etna	Siskiyou	122	32.97	236	63.78	0	0	6	1.62	6	1.62	370	-114	-30.81	9.72
Fort Jones	Siskiyou	105	34.77	184	60.93	3	0.99	3	0.99	7	2.32	302	-79	-26.16	16.22
Montague	Siskiyou	133	25.88	338	65.76	7	1.36	22	4.28	14	2.72	514	-205	-39.88	15.78
Mount Shasta	Siskiyou	1012	58.03	626	35.89	19	1.09	30	1.72	57	3.27	1744	386	22.14	5.31
Tulelake	Siskiyou	68	26.88	170	67.19	5	1.98	6	2.37	4	1.58	253	-102	-40.31	4.79
Unincorporated area of Siskiyou County	Siskiyou	4474	37.24	6994	58.22	78	0.65	273	2.27	194	1.61	12013	-2520	-20.98	7.06
Weed	Siskiyou	561	55.88	369	36.75	17	1.69	24	2.39	33	3.29	1004	192	19.13	6.64
Yreka	Siskiyou	1154	35.34	1947	59.63	31	0.95	73	2.24	60	1.84	3265	-793	-24.29	9.88
Benicia	Solano	8557	62.55	4670	34.13	88	0.64	177	1.29	189	1.38	13681	3887	28.42	6.17
Dixon	Solano	3046	49.04	2949	47.48	46	0.74	83	1.34	87	1.4	6211	97	1.56	11.39
Fairfield	Solano	20238	60.4	12026	35.89	228	0.68	499	1.49	518	1.55	33509	8212	24.51	13.12
Rio Vista	Solano	1691	52.06	1460	44.95	25	0.77	35	1.08	37	1.14	3248	231	7.11	12.62
Suisun City	Solano	5948	67	2545	28.67	73	0.82	137	1.54	175	1.97	8878	3403	38.33	13.65
Unincorporated area of Solano County	Solano	3600	42.51	4592	54.22	58	0.68	110	1.3	109	1.29	8469	-992	-11.71	6.44
Vacaville	Solano	17106	51.99	14557	44.24	236	0.72	473	1.44	530	1.61	32902	2549	7.75	14.1
Vallejo	Solano	29593	74.88	8555	21.65	194	0.49	467	1.18	710	1.8	39519	21038	53.23	8.08
Cloverdale	Sonoma	2133	61.67	1165	33.68	32	0.93	71	2.05	58	1.68	3459	968	27.99	3.87
Cotati	Sonoma	2475	71.39	802	23.13	23	0.66	58	1.67	109	3.14	3467	1673	48.26	1.54
Healdsburg	Sonoma	3521	65.62	1615	30.1	28	0.52	93	1.73	109	2.03	5366	1906	35.52	-0.84
Petaluma	Sonoma	17657	67.11	7567	28.76	138	0.52	406	1.54	544	2.07	26312	10090	38.35	1.12
Rohnert Park	Sonoma	10886	64.84	5030	29.96	136	0.81	305	1.82	433	2.58	16790	5856	34.88	2.65
Santa Rosa	Sonoma	44691	65.73	19966	29.37	483	0.71	1391	2.05	1458	2.14	67989	24725	36.36	-0.22
Sebastopol	Sonoma	3243	76.02	773	18.12	36	0.84	85	1.99	129	3.02	4266	2470	57.9	-2.75
Sonoma	Sonoma	3695	65.16	1723	30.38	38	0.67	92	1.62	123	2.17	5671	1972	34.78	-4.78
Unincorporated area of Sonoma County	Sonoma	48438	65.61	21824	29.56	459	0.62	1324	1.79	1783	2.42	73828	26614	36.05	-1.93
Windsor	Sonoma	6385	59.15	3973	36.8	65	0.6	156	1.45	216	2	10795	2412	22.35	4.35
Ceres	Stanislaus	5357	52.28	4480	43.72	90	0.88	112	1.09	208	2.03	10247	877	8.56	18.62
Hughson	Stanislaus	790	41.02	1075	55.82	15	0.78	17	0.88	29	1.51	1926	-285	-14.8	20.69
Modesto	Stanislaus	31894	49.89	29946	46.84	464	0.73	657	1.03	971	1.52	63932	1948	3.05	15.48
Newman	Stanislaus	1064	54.79	802	41.3	16	0.82	23	1.18	37	1.91	1942	262	13.49	18.03
Oakdale	Stanislaus	2438	41.04	3301	55.57	45	0.76	58	0.98	98	1.65	5940	-863	-14.53	16.6
Patterson	Stanislaus	1997	58.7	1278	37.57	33	0.97	37	1.09	57	1.68	3402	719	21.13	14.06
Riverbank	Stanislaus	2419	49.75	2282	46.94	45	0.93	47	0.97	69	1.42	4862	137	2.81	19.58
Turlock	Stanislaus	8223	43.09	10200	53.45	125	0.65	178	0.93	358	1.88	19084	-1977	-10.36	12.6
Unincorporated area of Stanislaus County	Stanislaus	12502	40.83	17153	56.01	208	0.68	311	1.02	449	1.47	30623	-4651	-15.18	14.33
Waterford	Stanislaus	855	43.87	1010	51.82	21	1.08	15	0.77	48	2.46	1949	-155	-7.95	26.85
Live Oak	Sutter	902	53.66	709	42.18	18	1.07	20	1.19	32	1.9	1681	193	11.48	14.76
Unincorporated area of Sutter County	Sutter	2817	29.21	6562	68.04	56	0.58	101	1.05	109	1.13	9645	-3745	-38.83	11.19
Yuba City	Sutter	7145	38.94	10553	57.51	129	0.7	229	1.25	295	1.61	18351	-3408	-18.57	12.03
Corning	Tehama	749	41.43	954	52.77	21	1.16	38	2.1	46	2.54	1808	-205	-11.34	13.37
Red Bluff	Tehama	1903	44.3	2116	49.26	72	1.68	108	2.51	97	2.26	4296	-213	-4.96	16.61
Tehama	Tehama	66	34.55	112	58.64	0	0	7	3.66	6	3.14	191	-46	-24.09	8.9
Unincorporated area of Tehama County	Tehama	5567	33.52	10306	62.06	177	1.07	303	1.82	254	1.53	16607	-4739	-28.54	10.39
Unincorporated area of Trinity County	Trinity	2960	46.24	3068	47.93	78	1.22	156	2.44	139	2.17	6401	-108	-1.69	10.32
Dinuba	Tulare	1747	50.96	1597	46.59	14	0.41	26	0.76	44	1.28	3428	150	4.37	15.96
Exeter	Tulare	943	32.74	1840	63.89	14	0.49	39	1.35	44	1.53	2880	-897	-31.15	11.35
Farmersville	Tulare	803	54.22	609	41.12	12	0.81	15	1.01	42	2.84	1481	194	13.1	16.94
Lindsay	Tulare	777	56.8	516	37.72	5	0.37	27	1.97	43	3.14	1368	261	19.08	19.72
Porterville	Tulare	3812	41.24	5047	54.6	48	0.52	105	1.14	232	2.51	9244	-1235	-13.36	14.03
Tulare	Tulare	4392	39.39	6372	57.15	57	0.51	106	0.95	223	2	11150	-1980	-17.76	13.49
Unincorporated area of Tulare County	Tulare	11329	34.53	20433	62.28	181	0.55	314	0.96	550	1.68	32807	-9104	-27.75	10.22
Visalia	Tulare	11774	34.46	21323	62.41	137	0.4	343	1	591	1.73	34168	-9549	-27.95	8.47
Woodlake	Tulare	604	61.44	329	33.47	6	0.61	15	1.53	29	2.95	983	275	27.97	17.41
Sonora	Tuolumne	1077	54.2	837	42.12	18	0.91	29	1.46	26	1.31	1987	240	12.08	13.74
Unincorporated area of Tuolumne County	Tuolumne	10461	43.57	12783	53.24	208	0.87	264	1.1	293	1.22	24009	-2322	-9.67	13.51
Camarillo	Ventura	13677	45.85	15063	50.5	182	0.61	455	1.53	452	1.52	29829	-1386	-4.65	11.63
Fillmore	Ventura	2518	57.5	1679	38.34	33	0.75	52	1.19	97	2.22	4379	839	19.16	18.04
Moorpark	Ventura	6187	46.01	6756	50.24	89	0.66	201	1.49	215	1.6	13448	-569	-4.23	11.53
Ojai	Ventura	2417	60.88	1383	34.84	30	0.76	77	1.94	63	1.59	3970	1034	26.04	3.24
Oxnard	Ventura	28633	66.52	12354	28.7	291	0.68	671	1.56	1093	2.54	43042	16279	37.82	15.09
Port Hueneme	Ventura	3727	59.17	2217	35.2	47	0.75	122	1.94	186	2.95	6299	1510	23.97	13.64
Santa Paula	Ventura	5044	64.24	2427	30.91	55	0.7	147	1.87	179	2.28	7852	2617	33.33	16.53
Simi Valley	Ventura	21774	43.9	25517	51.45	366	0.74	985	1.99	957	1.93	49599	-3743	-7.55	15.09
Thousand Oaks	Ventura	28487	47.37	29551	49.14	295	0.49	969	1.61	837	1.39	60139	-1064	-1.77	9.88
Unincorporated area of Ventura County	Ventura	20413	50.26	18424	45.36	271	0.67	802	1.97	707	1.74	40617	1989	4.9	9.01
Ventura	Ventura	27043	56.84	18546	38.98	300	0.63	844	1.77	844	1.77	47577	8497	17.86	11.21
Davis	Yolo	22222	73.46	6812	22.52	137	0.45	477	1.58	604	2	30252	15410	50.94	0.87
Unincorporated area of Yolo County	Yolo	3843	47.27	3990	49.08	54	0.66	108	1.33	135	1.66	8130	-147	-1.81	5.2
West Sacramento	Yolo	7459	59.37	4498	35.8	115	0.92	231	1.84	261	2.08	12564	2961	23.57	15.27
Winters	Yolo	1297	54.43	992	41.63	21	0.88	27	1.13	46	1.93	2383	305	12.8	9.32
Woodland	Yolo	9264	51.9	7942	44.5	120	0.67	228	1.28	294	1.65	17848	1322	7.4	13.18
Marysville	Yuba	1528	42.81	1835	51.41	45	1.26	78	2.19	83	2.33	3569	-307	-8.6	19.31
Unincorporated area of Yuba County	Yuba	5013	38.14	7455	56.71	151	1.15	237	1.8	289	2.2	13145	-2442	-18.57	18.56
Wheatland	Yuba	385	35.91	635	59.24	9	0.84	22	2.05	21	1.96	1072	-250	-23.33	16.63

== See also ==
- 2004 United States Senate election
