= Francine Busby =

American politician in California (born 1951)

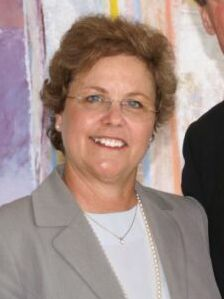
Busby in 2006

Francine Pocino Busby (born March 3, 1951) is a former member of the school board in Cardiff, California and was the chair of the San Diego County Democratic Party. She has four times been the Democratic candidate for Congress in California's 50th congressional district, in North San Diego County. In 2004, she ran unsuccessfully against incumbent Republican Congressman Randy "Duke" Cunningham. Before his term was up, Cunningham resigned due to his conviction on bribery charges, and Busby ran in the June 2006 special election to replace him; she lost to Republican Brian Bilbray, who again defeated her in the 2006 general election that November. She also ran unsuccessfully against Bilbray in 2010.

== Personal ==
Busby was born in Los Angeles, California, to an Italian American family, and grew up in nearby Arcadia. She graduated with a BA in Humanities from UC Irvine. From 1974–1981, Busby was a travel manager and marketer for the Walt Disney Travel Company. She married her husband David Busby in 1978. They had two children, Maria and Michael, and Busby quit her job to raise them. In 1988 the family moved to Cardiff-by-the-Sea, California.

Busby is fluent in Italian, and has written a book on Bosconero, the town of her ancestors on her mother's side.

She won $15K and cash and prizes over three days on $ale of the Century between December 24, 28, and 29th, 1987

== Political ==
She ran two successful school bond campaigns in 1998 and 2000, became president of the Cardiff Education Foundation in 2000, was appointed to fill a vacancy to the Cardiff School Board, and, in 2002, was elected for a full school board term. In January 2013 she was chosen as chair of the San Diego County Democratic Party. She is also the executive director of Run Women Run, an organization that trains, mentors, and supports women candidates for elective office.

== Electoral history ==
=== 2004 general election ===
Busby ran against then-Rep. Duke Cunningham in the 2004 U.S. House election, receiving 36% of the vote to Cunningham's 58%. Cunningham later resigned on November 28, 2005, after pleading guilty to federal charges of conspiracy to commit bribery, mail fraud, wire fraud, and tax evasion.

=== 2006 special congressional election ===
==== Initial vote ====
The initial vote in the special election was held on April 11, 2006. If a single candidate had won a simple majority, he or she would have served out the rest of Cunningham's term. Busby got the most votes, 43.75 percent, but fell short of the majority necessary to avoid a runoff race. As no candidate won a simple majority, the top vote-getters in each party faced each other in a runoff on June 6, 2006.

Because the 50th is considered to be a heavily Republican district, it would have been considered major news if Busby won. "This is a biggie," said Carl Luna, a political science professor at San Diego Mesa College. "Everyone is going to be reading the tea leaves as a predictor of November." For that reason, the National Republican Congressional Committee spent $5 million on this race.

On June 2, five days before the special congressional election, Busby was participating in a panel discussion with four other presenters who were addressing a largely Latino audience. She had been invited to explain her position in support of comprehensive immigration reform. The discussion was conducted in Spanish with some translation. During a discussion presented by a fellow panelist about ways to get involved in political action, a man from the back of the room addressed a question to Busby in Spanish. Busby said, "I didn't hear the entire question, but I understood that he wanted to help and said something about papers. I misspoke by saying he didn't need papers to vote. I meant that he didn't need papers to volunteer. This was not a discussion about my campaign." Her comments were recorded by a member of the Minutemen. "You can all help--you don't need papers to vote, and you don't need to be a registered voter to help." She made this comment in response to a question by a man who asked in Spanish, "I want to help, but I don't have papers." The recording was circulated over the Internet and on radio.

==== Runoff results ====
In the June 6 runoff, Busby faced the leading vote getter from the two other parties participating: Republican Brian Bilbray and Libertarian Paul King, as well as independent candidate William Griffith. Busby lost to Bilbray 49.3% to 45.5%. Bilbray thereby won the right to finish Cunningham's term, through January 2007.

=== 2006 general election ===
June 6, 2006, was also the date of the primary for the November general election. Busby and Bilbray each captured their party's nomination (as did Libertarian Paul King and Peace and Freedom candidate Miriam E. Clark).

Bilbray, with the advantage of incumbency, took an early lead. Both the Cook Political Report and CQPolitics rated the race as Republican Favored. But Busby gained in October (a late October poll by SurveyUSA showed Busby trailing by just 3 points) for a number of reasons: the general political climate seen as disadvantageous to the GOP, Busby's outraising Bilbray, and Bilbray's low profile campaign, on Oct. 23, CQPolitics changed their rating to Leans Republican.

Despite these developments, Busby lost to Bilbray in the general election in November, receiving 43% (77,695 votes) to Bilbray's 53% (95,459 votes).

=== 2010 general election ===
Busby formally announced her candidacy in the 2010 race for California's 50th Congressional District at a press conference April 16, 2009 in Encinitas.

An incident at a Busby fundraiser, at a home in Cardiff in June 2009, created a furor. During the fundraiser, a neighbor called the San Diego County Sheriff's Department to complain about noise. Deputy Marshall Abbott responded and entered the home; he wound up handcuffing and arresting the home's owner and another woman after the hostess refused to give the deputy her date of birth. Abbott used pepper spray on some of the guests and called for backup, which eventually included six police cars, a police dog, and a helicopter. No charges were filed against the women or the deputy. The two women and six other people filed a federal suit against the County of San Diego claiming that their civil rights had been violated. Without admitting any wrongdoing, the county agreed to pay $1.2 million in an out of court settlement.

Busby won the Democratic primary against rival Tracy Emblem in June 2010 and became the Democratic congressional nominee for California's 50th district in the 2010 midterm elections. She lost to Republican Brian Bilbray for the third time on November 2, 2010.
