= Brian Bilbray =

American politician & activist (born 1951)

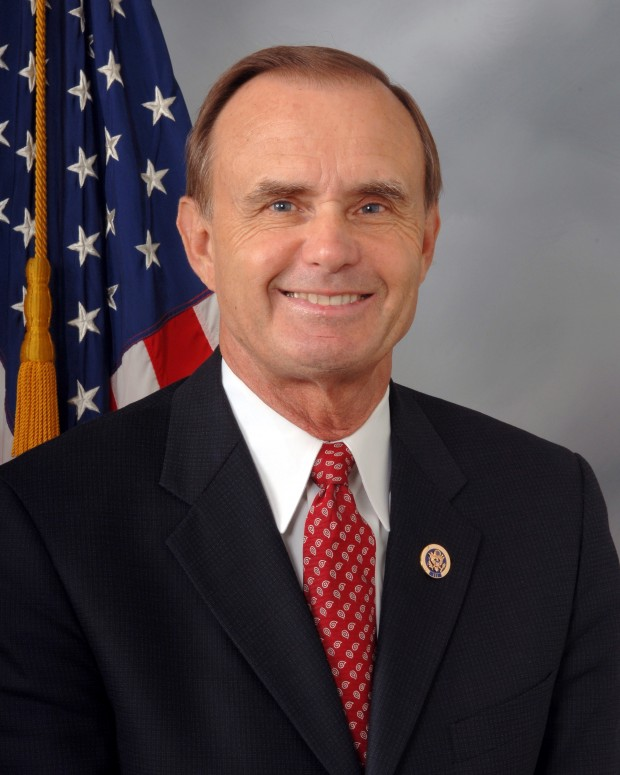
- Bilbray in 2012

Member of the U.S. House of Representatives from California
- In office January 3, 1995 – January 3, 2001
- Preceded by: Lynn Schenk
- Succeeded by: Susan Davis
- Constituency: 49th district
- In office June 6, 2006 – January 3, 2013 (Note: Bilbray's official service begins on the date of the special election, while he was not sworn in until June 13, 2006.)
- Preceded by: Duke Cunningham
- Succeeded by: Scott Peters (redistricted)
- Constituency: 50th district

Member of the San Diego County Board of Supervisors from the 1st district
- In office 1985–1995
- Preceded by: Tom Hamilton
- Succeeded by: Greg Cox

Personal details
- Born: Brian Phillip Bilbray; January 28, 1951 (age 75) Coronado, California, U.S.
- Party: Republican
- Spouse: Karen Bilbray
- Children: 5
- Relatives: James Bilbray (cousin)
- Education: Southwestern College

Brian Phillip Bilbray (born January 28, 1951) is an American politician who served in the U.S. House of Representatives from 1995 to 2001 and again from 2006 to 2013. He is a member of the Republican Party.

Bilbray was Chairman of the House Immigration Reform Caucus and a member of the influential House Energy and Commerce Committee. His subcommittee assignments on the Energy and Commerce Committee were as follows: Oversight and Investigations, Communication and Technology, and Energy and Power.

== Personal life ==
Bilbray was born in Coronado, California, and he grew up in Imperial Beach, California. He graduated from Mar Vista High School, where he played on the football team as a linebacker, and attended Southwestern College, a community college in Chula Vista, California. He worked as a tax consultant before entering politics.

Bilbray is a cousin of former Nevada Democratic Representative James Bilbray.

An avid surfer, he has compared surfing to politics.

== Mayor and supervisor ==
Bilbray became interested in politics when an extensive program of eminent domain was proposed for Imperial Beach. He ran successfully for the city council as a populist, serving during 1976–1978, and was mayor during 1978–1985.

As a mayor, Bilbray attempted to build a yacht marina in the Tijuana Estuary and to build a 1.5 mile breakwater off the beach of Imperial Beach. Both projects were stopped by the opposition of local surfers and environmentalists. The Tijuana River Estuary is now a National Estuarine Research Reserve and California State Park. The breakwater project was halted with the help of the then fledgling Surfrider Foundation. From 1985 to 1995, Bilbray was a member of the San Diego County Board of Supervisors.

== Member of Congress, 1995–2001 ==
In 1994, Bilbray won the Republican nomination for the 49th district, now the 53rd district, which included most of San Diego, and defeated freshman Democrat Lynn Schenk in the Republican landslide of that year. The 53rd was one of several marginal districts to go Republican in that cycle. Bilbray was reelected in 1996 and 1998. In 2000, he was defeated by State Assemblywoman Susan Davis.

== Lobbyist activities ==
In 2001, Bilbray registered as a federal lobbyist. His clients included San Diego Gas and Electric Company; the Viejas Band of Kumeyaay Indians; the San Diego Regional Airport Authority; Conquer Cancer and Alzheimer's Now; Los Angeles County; and Federation for American Immigration Reform.

Bilbray is a member of the ReFormers Caucus of Issue One.

== Elections ==
=== 2006 special congressional election ===
Bilbray ran in the 2006 special election to fill the vacancy in California's 50th congressional district caused by the resignation in December 2005 of fellow Republican Duke Cunningham, who pleaded guilty to felony charges of conspiracy and tax evasion, and subsequently went to jail. In March 2005, Bilbray moved to Carlsbad, California, to take care of his mother, who owns a home there.

The race to assume Cunningham's seat was highly contested, especially on the Republican side, with 14 Republicans (compared with only 2 Democrats) officially running for the position. Leading up to the initial all-candidate election that would determine the parties' candidates in a runoff election, Bilbray was in a virtual tie with Republican businessman Eric Roach, slightly ahead of former State Assemblyman Howard Kaloogian. Four days before the election, businessman Alan Uke, one of the major Republican candidates, ran an attack ad accusing Roach of outsourcing thousands of jobs at the expense of American workers. In the initial all-party special election on April 11, 2006, Bilbray was the Republican candidate with the most votes, receiving 15% of the total vote to Roach's 15%. He then faced the top vote getters of all the other parties in a runoff election on June 6, 2006: Democrat Francine Busby, Libertarian Paul King, and William Griffith, an independent.

During the campaign, Arizona Senator John McCain canceled a planned fundraiser for Bilbray at the last minute, after Bilbray called McCain's immigration bill "amnesty" for illegal immigrants.

Bilbray won the runoff with 49% of the vote, and was sworn in on June 13, 2006, as a member of the Congress. The Republican Party considered this a bellwether race because this district had "the perfect storm in favor of the Democrats" according to Ken Mehlman, the RNC Chairman at the time of the special election. The Democratic National Committee's Voting Rights Institute raised several concerns about the fairness and accuracy of the vote count. An election contest lawsuit sought a hand recount.

However, Bilbray was sworn in before the vote count was official. The court dismissed the suit on the basis that, once the House of Representatives had sworn in Bilbray, the court lacked jurisdiction to hear the challenge.

=== 2006 general election ===
Bilbray and Busby each won their party's primary, and faced each other again in the November general election. Bilbray defeated Busby by a margin of 54%–44%. Bilbray ran as an opponent of illegal immigration. With the advantage of incumbency and the Republican edge in registrations in the district, Bilbray was initially a clear favorite to win in November. Both the Cook Political Report and CQPolitics first rated the race as Republican Favored. But Busby gained in October, with a late-October poll by SurveyUSA showed Bilbray ahead by just 3 points, for a number of reasons: the general political climate seen as disadvantageous to the GOP, Busby's outraising Bilbray, and Bilbray's low profile campaign. On October 23, CQPolitics changed their rating to Leans Republican.

=== 2008 general election ===
Running unopposed in the June primary, Bilbray overcame a strong challenge from Democrat Nick Leibham in the November 2008 general election. With help from the DCCC and $1 million in donations, Leibham ran a string of TV attack ads against Bilbray. Democrats thought they had a chance at winning the district due to the hostile environment plaguing Republicans in general, and shifting demographics locally. Bilbray won, 50% to 46%, with 4% of the vote going to Libertarian candidate Wayne Dunlap.

=== 2012 general election ===
Due to district realignment after the 2010 census, Bilbray ran as the incumbent in the 52nd congressional district in 2012. An all-parties primary was held on June 5, 2012. A runoff between Bilbray and Port of San Diego Commissioner Scott Peters, a Democrat, was held on November 6. The initial vote was very close, so that a winner was not declared until ten days after the election as provisional ballots were counted. On November 16, with Peters ahead by 51% to 49%, Bilbray conceded defeat.

== Residency ==
Since his loss to Congresswoman Susan Davis in 2000, Bilbray has maintained residences and properties in Imperial Beach, California; Alexandria, Virginia; and Carlsbad, California. In response to requests to District Attorney Bonnie Dumanis, by the local Democratic Party and neighbors of the congressman, a San Diego County grand jury was convened to investigate claims against Bilbray's declared residency for the special and general elections in 2006. The investigation was dropped in May 2007.

Questions about Bilbray's residency again arose after his reelection on November 6, 2010, when he personally, as well as his children Briana and Patrick, claimed to not live in California and not qualify for in-state tuition in a class-action lawsuit against the University of California. Brian Bilbray appeared as a named plaintiff residing in Virginia.

== Political positions ==
During the 109th Congress Bilbray served on the House Armed Services, Veterans Affairs and Government Reform Committees. During his first term Bilbray co-authored legislation that led to the transfer of the Mount Soledad Veteran's Memorial from the City of San Diego to the federal government. He also authored legislation that would have reformed the federal budget process.

Bilbray positioned himself as moderate on some social issues while conservative on immigration and fiscal matters. He is a signer of the Taxpayer Protection Pledge.

During his second run for Congress in the 50th district, Bilbray won over many of the district's most conservative voters with his hard line stance on illegal immigration. Since then Bilbray's voting record has been considerably more conservative than it was during his first term. He is a member of both the moderate Republican Main Street Partnership and the conservative Republican Study Committee, two groups with conflicting positions on policy. For example, the RMSP supports embryonic stem cell research and opposes the Federal Marriage Amendment, while the RSC opposes embryonic stem cell research and supports the FMA. He is also a member of Republicans for Choice.

Bilbray voted in agreement with President George W. Bush 93% of the time, and as a result was given a 93% Presidential Support Score by CQ Politics in 2006. He served multiple terms in the U.S. House of Representatives. He represented California's 49th congressional district, which includes parts of San Diego County. He was elected to Congress in a special election in 2006 and subsequently reelected.

In October 2011, Bilbray voted for a bill that would prohibit public funding for abortions. It passed 251–172 in the House. Bilbray almost always has voted for free trade agreements in the past years, specifically with Korea, Colombia, and Panama, all of which passed. The following month, he introduced a new bill which would benefit veterans. It provides job training and internships paid for by federal grants.

In 2011, he voted for the National Defense Authorization Act for Fiscal Year 2012 as part of a controversial provision that allows the government and/or the military to indefinitely detain American citizens and others without trial.

== Committee assignments ==
- Committee on Energy and Commerce
  - Subcommittee on Communications and Technology
  - Subcommittee on Energy and Power
  - Subcommittee on Oversight and Investigations

== Electoral history ==
California's 49th congressional district: Results 1994–2000 California's 50th congressional district: Results 2006–2010 California's 52nd congressional district: Results 2012
Year	Winner	Votes	Pct	Runner-up	Votes	Pct	3rd Party	Party	Votes	Pct	3rd Party	Party	Votes	Pct
1994	Brian Bilbray	90,283	49%	Lynn Schenk (inc.)	85,597	46%	Chris Hoogenboom	Libertarian	5,288	3%	Renate M. Kline	Peace and Freedom	4,948	3%
1996	Brian Bilbray (inc.)	108,806	53%	Peter Navarro	86,657	42%	Ernie Lippe	Libertarian	4,218	2%	Kevin Hambsch	Reform	3,773	2%
1998	Brian Bilbray (inc.)	90,516	49%	Christine Kehoe	86,400	47%	Ernie Lippe	Libertarian	3,327	2%	Julia F. Simon	Natural Law	2,829	2%
2000	Susan Davis	113,400	50%	Brian Bilbray (inc.)	105,515	46%	Doris Ball	Libertarian	6,526	3%	Tahir I. Bhatti	Natural Law	3,048	1%
2006	Brian Bilbray	78,341	49%	Francine Busby	71,146	45%	William Griffith	Independent	6,027	4%	Paul King	Libertarian	2,519	2%
2006	Brian Bilbray (inc.)	118,018	53%	Francine Busby	96,612	44%	Paul King	Libertarian	4,119	2%	Miriam E. Clark	Peace and Freedom	3,353	2%
2008	Brian Bilbray (inc.)	157,502	50%	Nick Leibham	141,635	45%	Wayne Dunlap	Libertarian	14,365	5%				
2010	Brian Bilbray (inc.)	142,247	57%	Francine Busby	97,818	39%	Lars Grossmith	Libertarian	5,546	2%	Miriam E. Clark	Peace and Freedom	5,470	2%
2012	Scott Peters	151,451	51%	Brian Bilbray (inc.)	144,459	49%								

U.S. House of Representatives
Preceded by Lynn Schenk	Member of the U.S. House of Representatives from California's 49th congressional district 1995–2001	Succeeded by Susan Davis
Preceded by Duke Cunningham	Member of the U.S. House of Representatives from California's 50th congressional district 2006–2013	Succeeded by Duncan D. Hunter
U.S. order of precedence (ceremonial)
Preceded by Bill Lowery as Former U.S. Representative	Order of precedence of the United States as Former U.S. Representative	Succeeded by Tony Cárdenas as Former U.S. Representative
