= 2006 California's 50th congressional district special election =

- June 6, 2006
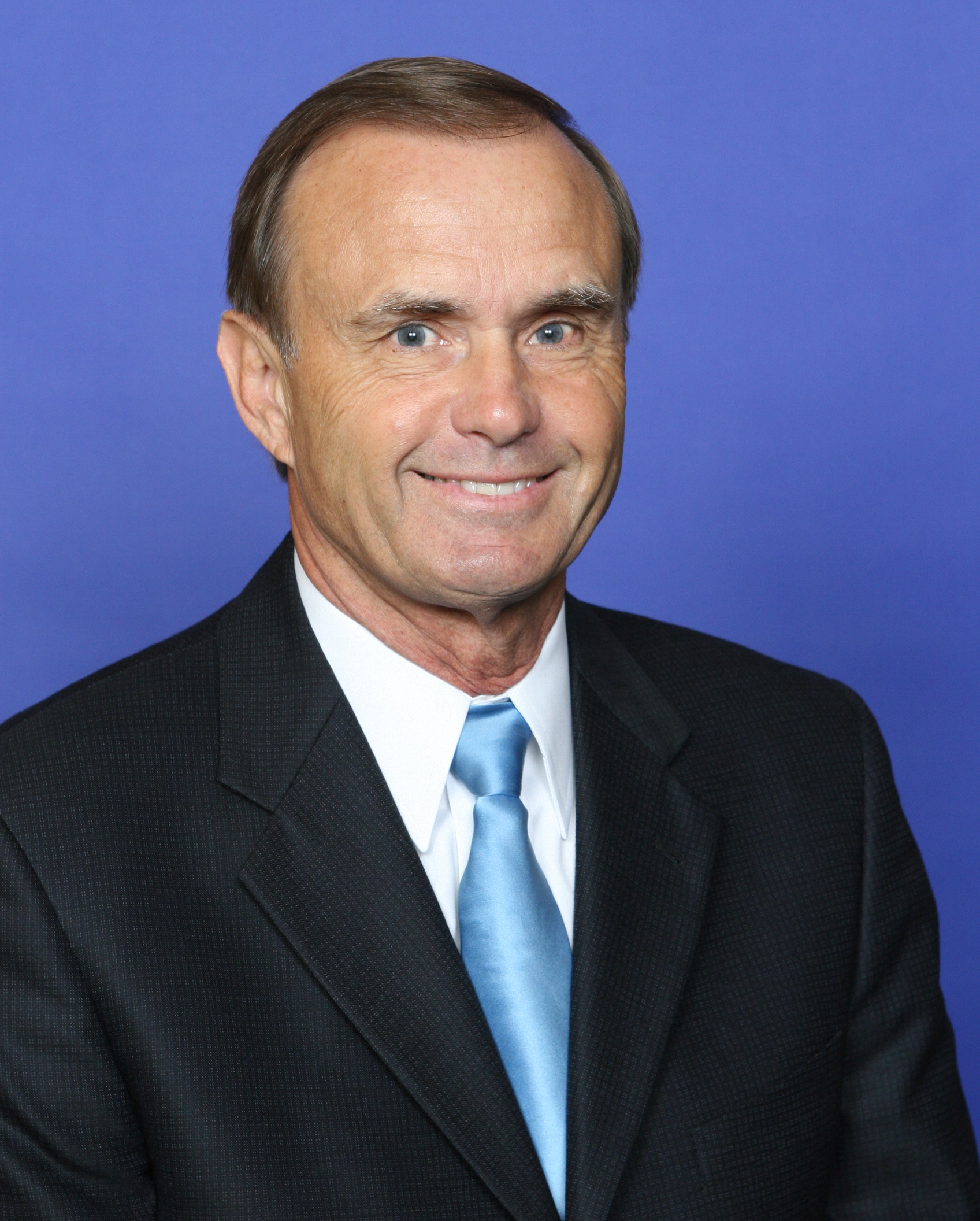

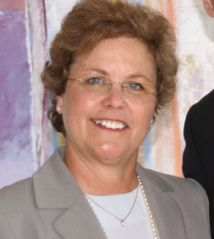
Nominee	Brian Bilbray	Francine Busby
Party	Republican	Democratic
Popular vote	78,341	71,146
Percentage	49.30%	44.77%
Representative before election
Duke Cunningham
Republican
Elected Representative
Brian Bilbray
Republican

On June 6, 2006, a special election was held in California's 50th congressional district to choose a new member of the U.S. Representative to fill the vacancy caused by the resignation of Republican Randy Cunningham. Cunningham resigned on November 28, 2005, after pleading guilty to bribery, wire fraud, mail fraud, and tax evasion charges, and was sentenced to eight years and four months in federal prison in 2006.

The special primary election was held on April 11, 2006. A candidate who received a majority of the vote would have served out the rest of Cunningham's term. As no candidate won a simple majority, the top vote-getters in each party, Democrat Francine Busby and Republican Brian Bilbray, competed in a runoff special general election held on June 6, 2006, the same day that primaries were held for the November 2006 general election.

Bilbray won the special election 49 percent to 45 percent and was sworn in as a U.S. Representative on June 13, 2006. In the June 6 primary election for the November 2006 election, both candidates won their party's nomination. In the November 2006 general election rematch, Bilbray won re-election.

== Primary election ==
On April 11, Democrat Francine Busby garnered 43.63 percent of the vote, 6.38 percentage points short of the majority necessary to avoid a runoff race. She faced the leading vote getter from the two other parties participating: Republican Brian Bilbray and Libertarian Paul King, as well as independent candidate William Griffith, in a June 6 runoff.

2006 California 50th congressional district special primary
Party	Candidate	Votes	%
Democratic	Francine Busby	60,010	43.6
Republican	Brian Bilbray	20,952	15.2
Republican	Eric Roach	19,891	14.5
Republican	Howard Kaloogian	10,207	7.4
Republican	Bill Morrow	7,369	5.3
Republican	Alan Uke	5,477	4.0
Republican	Richard Earnest	2,957	2.1
Republican	Bill Hauf	2,207	1.6
Republican	Scott Turner	2,041	1.5
Democratic	Chris Young	1,808	1.3
Independent	William Griffith	1,111	0.8
Republican	Victor Ramirez	912	0.7
Libertarian	Paul King	819	0.6
Republican	Jeff Newsome	574	0.4
Republican	Scott Orren	345	0.2
Republican	Delecia Holt	261	0.2
Republican	Bill Boyer	204	0.1
Republican	Milton Gale	58	0.1
Invalid or blank votes		326	0.2
Total votes		137,529	100.0
Turnout			38.9
Republican hold			

== General election ==
=== Campaign ===
Because the 50th is considered to be a heavily Republican district, it would have been considered major news if Busby had won. "This is a biggie," said Carl Luna, a political science professor at San Diego's Mesa College. "Everyone is going to be reading the tea leaves as a predictor of November." For that reason, the National Republican Congressional Committee spent $5 million on this race.

=== Controversies ===
During the campaign, Arizona Senator John McCain cancelled a planned fundraiser for Bilbray at the last minute, after Bilbray criticized McCain's immigration bill as "amnesty" for illegal immigrants.

On June 2, five days before the special congressional election, Busby was recorded telling a largely Hispanic group that "You can all help--you don't need papers for voting, you don't need to be a registered voter to help." This comment was in response to a question by a man who asked in Spanish, "I want to help, but I don't have papers." The recording was circulated over the Internet and on radio. Republicans claimed Busby was encouraging people to vote illegally, while Busby claimed she misspoke and meant that a person does not need to be a registered voter to help her campaign (such as phoning registered voters).

A number of irregularities in the election were alleged, including the swearing in of Bilbray by a member of his own party 17 days before the election was certified, "electronic voting machines sent out to the homes and cars of volunteers for up to 12 days prior to the election, and irregular election results like huge mega-precincts of absentee ballots where turnout was thousands of percent more than registered voters." The Democratic National Committee's Voting Rights Institute raised several concerns about the fairness and accuracy of the vote count. An election contest lawsuit sought a hand recount. The court dismissed the suit on the basis that, once the House of Representatives had sworn in Bilbray, the court lacked jurisdiction to hear the challenge.

=== Polling ===
Source	Date	Francine Busby (D)	Brian Bilbray (R)	Other	None	Undecided	Margin of Error
Survey USA	May 30 to June 1, 2006	45%	47%	9%		0%	4.7%
LRP (Dem)	May 12–15, 2006	47%	40%	1%		12%	4.9%
Survey USA	May 5–7, 2006	45%	45%	9%		1%	4.8%
Moore (Rep)	April 29–30, 2006	43%	37%	2%	5%	13%	5%

=== Endorsements ===
Francine Busby (D)

Individuals

- Wesley Clark, General, 2004 democratic presidential candidate

=== Results ===
In the June 6 runoff, Bilbray received a plurality with 78,341 votes (49.30%) to become the district's congressman for the remainder of the 109th Congress (until January 3, 2007).

For the new term beginning in 2007, the primaries were held on June 6, 2006, concurrent with the special election. Busby and Bilbray each captured their party's nomination (as did Libertarian Paul King and Peace and Freedom candidate Miriam E. Clark). In the November 2006 general election, Bilbray was again declared the winner.

2006 California's 50th congressional district special election
Party	Candidate	Votes	%
Republican	Brian Bilbray	78,341	49.6
Democratic	Francine Busby	71,146	45.0
Independent	William Griffith	6,027	3.8
Libertarian	Paul King	2,519	1.6
Invalid or blank votes		882	0.6
Total votes		158,915	100.0
Turnout			44.7
Republican hold			

== Analysis ==
Political analyst Larry Sabato wrote in his Crystal Ball newsletter: "What a difference four percentage points makes! That was Bilbray's margin over Busby, a gaffe-prone, lackluster candidate who was out of her league. With six years (1995–2001) under his belt from another California House district, former congressman Bilbray understood what it took to win a tough campaign, and riding the immigration issue, he did so. The DCCC forced the NRCC to pull out all the stops and spend a large fortune for Bilbray, but given the dam that might have burst had Busby won, it was worth every GOP penny for them."

== See also ==
- List of special elections to the United States House of Representatives
