= Howard Kaloogian =

American politician

Member of the California State Assembly from the 74th district
- In office December 5, 1994 – November 30, 2000
- Preceded by: Robert C. Frazee
- Succeeded by: Mark Wyland

Personal details
- Born: December 30, 1959 (age 66) Detroit, Michigan, US
- Party: Republican
- Spouse: Martha Lynn
- Education: Michigan State University; Pepperdine University School of Law

Howard James Kaloogian (born December 30, 1959) is an American politician and a former Republican member of the California State Assembly, having served in the State Assembly for the 74th district from 1994 to 2000. After leaving office, he was active in the 2003 California recall, and unsuccessfully ran in 2004 for the United States Senate and in a special election in 2006 to the United States House of Representatives.

== Biography ==
Kaloogian grew up in Michigan, of Armenian-born parents. Kaloogian earned a Bachelor's from Michigan State University and a J.D. degree from Pepperdine University School of Law. During 1988–1996, he was an estate attorney. He got his start in politics at the suggestion of Bill Morrow, after Morrow read a strongly worded letter Kaloogian wrote to the editor of the San Diego Union-Tribune purporting to correct a reader's misleading interpretation of the preamble to the Constitution of the United States.

From 1994–2000, Kaloogian was a member of the California Assembly, representing California District 74, which covers portions of northern San Diego County. He won his seat in the 1994 legislative elections, with 61% of the votes counted. He endorsed Senator Phil Gramm's presidential bid in 1995.

Kaloogian was twice re-elected to the Assembly. He recorded an unchanged majority, 61%, in the 1996 legislative election and was re-elected again in the 1998 election, where his share of the vote fell to 57%.

In 2003, Kaloogian became the chairman of the Recall Gray Davis Committee, dedicated to the ousting of governor Gray Davis.

Kaloogian is a founder and co-chairman of Move America Forward, a political action group. Kaloogian considers President Ronald Reagan to be one of his political heroes. Kaloogian serves on the Ronald Reagan Legacy Project and was the Chairman of the Defend Reagan Project, which campaigned in 2003 for CBS to drop a docudrama about Reagan, The Reagans. The campaign was successful, as CBS did not show the mini-series, but handed it off to Showtime.

In 2004 Kaloogian ran for the U.S. Senate from California but lost the Republican primary with 11% of the vote, placing him 3rd out of 11 candidates. He also ran unsuccessfully in the special election to fill the opening created by the resignation of disgraced Congressman Duke Cunningham in California's 50th Congressional District.

In 2008 Kaloogian chaired an Anti-Barack Obama political action committee called "Our country deserves better". He appeared in a video ad for that group.

Howard Kaloogian is married to Martha Lynn, and has a step-son.

== 2006 campaign for Congress ==
Kaloogian ran in the special election to fill the opening in California's 50th District to the House of Representatives caused by the resignation of disgraced former Congressman Duke Cunningham. In the special elections where the top vote-getter from each party moves to the next round, Kaloogian finished a distant third among the Republican candidates. The next round took place at the same time as the primary for the term that commenced January 3, 2007. On April 17, Kaloogian announced his withdrawal from the primary for the next congressional term. State Senator Bill Morrow, who was running against Kaloogian, challenged an implied endorsement by him of Kaloogian on Kaloogian's website.

=== Altered photo and other controversies ===
During the 2006 campaign, an image showing "a busy urban street scene" in Baghdad was posted on Kaloogian's web site. The image was removed after bloggers at the Daily Kos noted that the image was actually of Istanbul. Kaloogian later said using the photo was "a stupid mistake".

Kaloogian was involved with another controversy with Lowell Robert "Bob" Fuselier, "Business Law Group PC" and "Ambassador Property Management," Vista, CA, and both of Kaloogian and Fuselier, LLP law firm in Carlsbad, CA. NBC San Diego News reports that Howard Kaloogian and Bob Fuselier stole over $150,000 of their client's money. Bob Fuselier admitted to cashing a check made out to their client and withdrawing $60,000. Fuselier refused to disclose where the rest of the money was being held. A criminal complaint was filed with the Carlsbad Police Department. Kaloogian and Fuselier convinced the DA and the Superior Court of California, San Diego, North County Division, that they had a right to keep their client's money for charges in a separate and unconnected case. Kaloogian & Fuselier won by default. The client reports that Kaloogian & Fuselier told so many lies, papered him and the courts over with so many false allegations and trumped up lawsuits to keep the money, that he ended up defaulting.

Political offices
Preceded by Robert C. Frazee	California State Assemblyman, 74th District; December 5, 1994 - November 30, 2000	Succeeded by Mark Wyland
