= Attack of the Killer Tomatoes (disambiguation) =

Attack of the Killer Tomatoes is a 1978 comedy film. It may also refer to:

- Attack of the Killer Tomatoes (TV series)
- Attack of the Killer Tomatoes (1986 video game)
- Attack of the Killer Tomatoes (1991 video game)

== See also ==
- Killer tomato (disambiguation)
- Return of the Killer Tomatoes
