= Attack of the Killer Potatoes =

Book by Peter Lerangis

Attack of the Killer Potatoes is a 1997 science-fiction children's story by Peter Lerangis. Its title spoofs the 1978 film, Attack of the Killer Tomatoes, and the film's sequels. The book's tagline reads, "Lock the doors, close the windows, warn the neighbors...". The book was published by the children's publishing division of Scholastic Press, Apple Paperback.

== Plot ==
The story tells of several potatoes exposed to chemicals. The chemicals cause the potatoes to rapidly grow in size, become clever and sapient, and begin an attack on humanity. In essence, the book is a parody of the creature-feature films of the 1950s, combined with the oddball satire of Attack of the Killer Tomatoes.

== Reception ==
Reception was mostly mixed. Critics felt it was a fun but nonsensical children's book.

== See also ==
- Attack of the Killer Tomatoes
- Help! I'm Trapped...
- Return of the Killer Tomatoes
- Killer Tomatoes Strike Back
- Killer Tomatoes Eat France

== Resources ==
- Attack of the Killer Potatoes on Epinions
