= Killer Tomatoes Eat France =

1992 film

- Directed by: John De Bello
- Written by: John De Bello; Constantine Dillon; J. Stephen Peace
- Produced by: John De Bello; J. Stephen Peace
- Starring: John Astin; Steve Lundquist; Marc Price; Angela Visser
- Cinematography: Kevin Morrisey
- Edited by: Beth Accomando
- Music by: Rick Patterson
- Production company: Four Square Productions
- Distributed by: New World Pictures; 20th Century Fox
- Release date: November 18, 1992
- Running time: 94 minutes
- Country: United States
- Language: English

Killer Tomatoes Eat France! is a 1992 American film that was released as the fourth to Attack of the Killer Tomatoes. Like its predecessor, Killer Tomatoes Strike Back, it was a direct-to-video release. The film had been intended as the third in the series according to Return of the Killer Tomatoes but was replaced as the third film by Killer Tomatoes Strike Back. It is the final film made by New World Pictures before their sale to News Corporation in 1997. Because the film was co-produced with the corporate successor 20th Century Fox (1997 merger), this is the only New World film whose rights are solely owned by 20th Century Fox.

== Plot ==
Dr. Mortimer Gangreen escapes from prison and has set up a base at his assistant Igor's 'Really Big Castle' located outside Paris, France, and he is still bent on global domination. Using his Killer Tomatoes, Gangreen plans to stage a second French revolution according to an old prophecy written by Nicodemus, in which the king of France (Louis XVII) will return to claim the throne. The only image of Louis XVII shows that he bears a close resemblance to Igor, and Gangreen plans to use this to his advantage to have Igor impersonate Louis XVII to claim the throne.

Has-been TV actor Michael and Marie, the French girl he meets and falls in love with, attempt to stop Gangreen's plan.

As the Killer Tomatoes begin their attack on France and they have a giant, fire-breathing tomato that gobbles a tour guide. Hoping to reach the outskirts of Paris, the true King returns and faces a showdown with Igor as to who shall rightly become king. With the help of Michael and Marie, Louis triumphs, and Gangreen escapes in a tomato-shaped hot-air balloon, planning revenge and swearing to return.

== Cast ==
- Marc Price as Michael
- Angela Visser as Marie
- Steve Lundquist as Igor / Louis XVII (dual role)
- John Astin as Professor Mortimer Gangreen
- Rick Rockwell as Ze Captain
- Kevin West as the Concert Emcee
- Eileen Bowman as the Tour Guide

== Production ==
The film hams up French stereotypes (including references to eating snails), however, it appears to condone the actions of French Monarchist groups like Nouvelle Action Royaliste. Several people are shown attempting to prove themselves as the true Queen of France, and the female lead is heard saying: "The French Revolution was a big mistake."

The characters of Zoltan, Kethuck and Viper are borrowed from Attack of the Killer Tomatoes: The Animated Series but are given completely different appearances. Zoltan was redesigned with an eyepatch and various stitching over his body, Ketchuck was refined as a Larry Fine character and was no longer drooling and obese like his cartoon counterpart, and Viper was based on a similar character, Fang, another snake-based tomato.

== Differences from previous Killer Tomatoes films ==
Several points in this movie were different from those made in the first three Killer Tomatoes films. The tomatoes speak fluent English, whereas in all other movies it was proven they had their own language. Additionally, vegetables and fruits were shown to be sentient without Gangreen's help, whereas it was only via Gangreen's experiments that they were shown to become sentient.

== Documentary ==
Screaming Soup! Presents the Attack of the Killer Tomatoes Retrospective, a documentary film focusing on the history of the Attack of the Killer Tomatoes franchise with interviews including cast and crew from Killer Tomatoes Eat France, was released in February 2023 on YouTube.
