= Beth Accomando =

American film critic

- Born: Beth Accomando
- Education: Bonita Vista High School; University of California, San Diego
- Occupations: Film critic; arts reporter; podcast host; film festival curator; film editor
- Employers: KPBS Public Media; NPR; XETV
- Known for: Cinema Junkie
- Notable credits: Killer Tomatoes Eat France; Killer Tomatoes Strike Back
- Awards: 2023 Bob Clampett Humanitarian Award

Beth Accomando is an American film and theatre critic for KPBS, who formerly worked as an arts reporter for NPR, XETV and The Star-News. She hosts the Cinema Junkie podcast and has curated several film events throughout San Diego County. Accomando edited the 1991 to 1992 sequels of the Attack of the Killer Tomatoes franchise and is part of the Alliance of Women Film Journalists and Critics' Choice Movie Awards. Her work has been distributed through several publications, including RogerEbert.com.

== Early life ==
Upon graduating from Bonita Vista High School in 1978, Accomando was the recipient of the Bank of America certificate for English and was Chula Vista Elks Most Valuable Scholar. While in college, she was a special writer for The Star-News. Accomando graduated from University of California, San Diego, in 1982 with a degree in communications and visual arts.

== Career ==
Accomando is a theatre and film critic for KPBS who reviewed films such as Sucker Punch, The Fall, The Brave One, and Knocked Up. She runs a podcast called Cinema Junkie and in 2014, Accomando organized the Film Geeks late-night screenings at Digital Gym Cinema. She described just how much George A. Romero's Night of the Living Dead influenced Edgar Wright's Shaun of the Dead.

In 1985, Accomando was one of 12 women featured in A San Diego Exhibition: Forty-two Emerging Artists at La Jolla Museum of Contemporary Art. In the early 1990s, she was the film editor for Killer Tomatoes Strike Back and Killer Tomatoes Eat France. Accomando worked for XETV-TDT in 1992 and in 1998, introduced the film Rashomon at Landmark's Ken Cinema.

In 2000, Accomando curated an event in San Diego that held premieres for Butterfly and Sword, Eastern Condors, Holy Weapon, The Magic Crystal, Pedicab Driver and Shanghai Blues. She wrote for National Public Radio and helped put together an Asian festival at University of California, San Diego. In a 2007 interview, Lee Ann Kim described Accomando as the one "who really plugged me into international Asian film". Accomando has interviewed Chow Yun Fat, Jackie Chan, Stanley Tong and John Woo. She was a panelist at UCSD's Up & Coming Film Festival with Ham Tran in 2008, Ligiah Villalobos in 2009, and with Arthur Ollman in 2011. In 2016, Accomando judged a play called Killing Buddha at San Diego International Fringe Festival.

In 2017, Accomando was a judge at Horrible Imaginings Film Festival. She was part of a Storytelling in Film panel with Michael Lewis Foster, Neal Hallford and Jonathan Hammond at San Diego Comic Con in 2021. She hosted Flicks on the Bricks in 2018, 2022 and 2023 at Athenaeum Music & Arts Library.

In June 2025, Accomando won a Pacific Southwest regional Emmy Award for the video podcast Stripper Energy: Fighting Back From the Fringes.

== Filmography ==
Year	Title	Notes
1991	Killer Tomatoes Strike Back	Editor
1992	Killer Tomatoes Eat France	Editor

== Awards ==
Award	Year	Result	Ref.
Chula Vista Elks Most Valuable Scholar	1978	Won	
Bank of America English certificate	1978	Won	
Promotional Announcement Emmy	1992	Won	
Light Feature Story/Series	2006	Runner-up	
Inkpot Award	2022	Won	
Bob Clampett Humanitarian Award	2023	Won	
Emmy Award	2025	Won	

== Selected works ==
=== Articles ===
- RogerEbert.com

=== Publications ===
- Alliance of Women Film Journalists
