= Killer Tomatoes Strike Back =

1991 film by John De Bello

Killer Tomatoes Strike Back!
- DVD cover
- Directed by: John De Bello
- Written by: John De Bello Constantine Dillon Rick Rockwell
- Produced by: John De Bello J. Stephen Peace
- Starring: Rick Rockwell Crystal Carson Steve Lundquist John Astin
- Cinematography: Stephen F. Andrich
- Edited by: Beth Accomando
- Music by: Neal Fox Rick Patterson
- Production company: Four Square Productions
- Distributed by: 20th Century Fox
- Release date: November 14, 1991
- Running time: 87 minutes
- Country: United States
- Language: English

Killer Tomatoes Strike Back! is a 1991 American comedy film. It is the third in the Killer Tomatoes film series, following Attack of the Killer Tomatoes (1978) and Return of the Killer Tomatoes (1988), and followed by Killer Tomatoes Eat France (1992). The film stars Rick Rockwell, Crystal Carson, Steve Lundquist, John Witherspoon and John Astin.

The film is the first in which the killer tomatoes are shown with faces, and the only Killer Tomatoes film that does not begin with the traditional Killer Tomatoes score, although remixes play during the film. The film was a direct-to-video release.

== Plot ==
Police assistant Lance Boyle is a childish detective who is lumbered with worthless police cases. However, after several murders in a nearby wood that concern Killer Tomatoes, Lance finds himself working alongside Kennedy Johnson, a Tomatologist, to solve the murders.

Nearby, Professor Mortimer Gangreen has begun using subliminal mind control on his talk show, disguised as talk show host Jeronahew. After kidnapping members of the press and media, Gangreen and his assistant Igor plot to use his brainwashed press members, as well as the Subliminal Mind control, to overpower the human race and make the world a planet run by himself and his killer tomatoes, though he has rather childish plans for world domination: "Next time I fly; my bags will not be the last ones on the carousel!" as well as planning to reward Igor with "the K-Mart in East Rutherford".

Following countless killer tomatoes attacks, Lance and Kennedy finally reach Gangreen's hideout, where they must pit themselves against killer tomatoes, brainwashed newsreaders and a giant bacon, lettuce and human sandwich, of which Kennedy may be a part. With help from FT (Fuzzy Tomato, from Return of the Killer Tomatoes), Lance rescues Kennedy and Gangreen is defeated, left at the mercy of the hungry killer tomatoes.

== References to other movies ==
- Special Agent Sam Smith is now working in a bar catering to tomatoes. Boyle asks him for a Bloody Mary, referencing the bonfire scene in Attack of The Killer Tomatoes.
- At Media Appreciation Day Charles White is trampled underfoot, similar to his last scene in Return of The Killer Tomatoes.
- Police Inspector Finletter is seen carrying several sheets of fax paper, a reference to his parachute in Attack of The Killer Tomatoes.
- Mrs. Williams from Attack of The Killer Tomatoes is trying to open a bank account, once again being interrupted and confronted by a tomato.
- Detectives Boyle and Rood parody Riggs and Murtaugh in Lethal Weapon.
- The first victims of tomatoes are a nude girl and a hockey player, in reference to Friday the 13th.
- The shower scene from Psycho is parodied in its entirety.

== Cast ==
- Rick Rockwell as Lance Boyle
- Crystal Carson as Kennedy Johnson
- Steve Lundquist as Igor
- John Witherspoon as Evan Rood
- John Astin as Professor Mortimer Gangreen
- Kevin West as Bank Teller
- J. Stephen Peace as Captain Wilbur Finletter
- John De Bello as Charles White
- Frank Davis as Sam Smith
- Robin Abb as Betty Wont

== Documentary ==
Screaming Soup! Presents the Attack of the Killer Tomatoes Retrospective, a documentary film focusing on the history of the Attack of the Killer Tomatoes franchise with interviews including cast and crew from Killer Tomatoes Strike Back, was released in February 2023 on YouTube.
