= Attack of the Killer Tomatoes: Organic Intelligence =

- Official poster
- Directed by: David Ferino
- Written by: Costa Dillon; J. Stephen Peace
- Produced by: Roger M. Mayer; Michael Polis
- Starring: Myrna Velasco; Zachary Roozen; Noor Razooky; Dan Bakkedahl; Daniel Roebuck; Paul Bates; Eric Allan Kramer; Samantha Bailey; Eric Roberts; Catherine Corcoran
- Cinematography: Patrick Russo
- Production companies: W. Finletter Films; Killer Tomatoes Entertainment; Atomic Toybox; IVC/Olas Media
- Distributed by: Starboard Entertainment
- Release dates: February 20, 2026 (USS Midway Museum); August 7, 2026 (Limited); October 6, 2026 (VOD)
- Running time: 96 minutes
- Country: United States
- Language: English

Attack of the Killer Tomatoes: Organic Intelligence is a 2026 American comedy horror film written by Costa Dillon and J. Stephen Peace, and directed by David Ferino. It stars Myrna Velasco, Zachary Roozen, Noor Razooky, Dan Bakkedahl, and Daniel Roebuck.

The film is a reboot and the fifth installment of the Attack of the Killer Tomatoes franchise.

== Cast ==
- Myrna Velasco
- Zachary Roozen as Chad
- Noor Razooky as Angela
- Dan Bakkedahl as Wilbur Finletter
- Daniel Roebuck
- Paul Bates
- Eric Allan Kramer
- Samantha Bailey as Kate Patel
- Eric Roberts
- Catherine Corcoran
- David Brown
- Joshua Poon
- Vernee Watson
- David Koechner as U.S. president's Press Secretary
- John Astin as Professor Mortimer Gangreen
- Tom Arnold

== Production ==
Ferino was signed on to direct by executive producers Dillon and Peace. Principal photography took place in Los Angeles, Long Beach and several parts of San Diego, including Chula Vista, Mission Bay, East County, and an area near the USS Midway and USS Midway Museum.

It was produced by W. Finletter Films, Killer Tomatoes Entertainment, Atomic Toybox, and IVC/Olas Media.

It was previously announced by JoBlo.com that Ask a Ninja creators were making the reboot and that filmmaker Dustin Ferguson was also attached to the project.

== Release ==
The film premiered on February 20, 2026 at the USS Midway Museum in San Diego. Starboard Entertainment, formerly Anchor Bay Entertainment, distributed the film. The film had a limited release in New York, Los Angeles, Chicago, and San Diego on August 7, 2026. It is scheduled to be released on video on demand on October 6, 2026.

== See also ==
- List of media set in San Diego
