= Crystal Carson =

American actress and acting coach

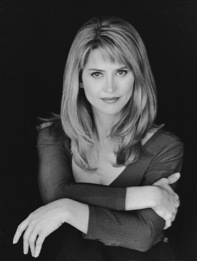
- Photo by Michael Wallis.
- Born: Nebraska, U.S.
- Education: University of Nebraska–Lincoln
- Years active: 1986–present
- Spouse: Peter Bradley (m.1990)
- Children: 1
- Website: crystalcarson.com

Crystal Carson (born June 24) is an American actress and acting coach. She is best known for playing Julia Barrett on the ABC soap opera General Hospital from 1991 to 1993. She is also an acting coach who has had many well known Hollywood clients.

== Early life ==
Carson was born in Nebraska. She is the oldest of four children. Her father, who managed the circulation department at the Omaha World Herald, died from cancer when Carson was seven. After her father's death, her mother took over his business and the circulation department was moved to their family home. Carson began answering phones, using different voices to respond. When Carson was a teenager, her mother remarried and had another child.

After high school, Carson moved to New York, hoping to attend NYU, but she was rejected for a theater scholarship. She attended Long Island University, until her time there was cut short by arts funding cutbacks. She eventually graduated from the University of Nebraska–Lincoln with a degree in theater and a minor in computer science.

== Career ==
She began acting as a teen in Nebraska, doing community theater and working as an extra in Terms of Endearment. After moving to New York, she was introduced to Sharon Gabet, who helped her get an audition for the CBS soap opera The Edge of Night. Carson turned down the offer of a one-year contract because she was about to begin classes at Long Island University.

Carson played the role of Trish in the 1986 horror film The Zero Boys and Denise in the 1987 Madonna film Who's That Girl. On television, she landed guest appearances on Thirtysomething and Simon & Simon. In 1989, Carson had a recurring role on Dallas as Elaine Eddy, an actress who played Sue Ellen Ewing in a movie about her life.

In the early 1990s, Carson guest starred on Cheers, Charles in Charge, and Midnight Caller. She appeared in the films Cartel and Hollywood Heartbreak. She starred as Kennedi Johnson in the comedy film Killer Tomatoes Strike Back with John Astin. Carson also played Nora in the thriller Kiss and Be Killed.

Carson played the contract role of Julia Barrett on the ABC soap opera General Hospital from 1991 to 1993, returning for guest appearances in 1997 and 1998.

She guest starred on Ellen in 1994 and had a recurring role as Cmdr. Carpenter on JAG in 2002. Carson also had a recurring role as Lydia in the 2015 web series Club 5150.

Carson now has a full-time career as an acting coach, running the Auditioning By Heart acting school. Her clients have included Rachel Nichols, Isabel Lucas, Dylan Bruce, Ricardo Chavira, David Boreanaz, Tricia Helfer, and Paula Abdul.

In 2024, she played Teresa in the romantic comedy film A Wall Away.

== Personal life ==
Carson met her husband, computer programmer Peter Bradley, while she was waitressing at a bar in Lincoln, Nebraska. His car had broken down in front of the bar. They were married in July 1990 in a church on the Maine coastline, near Kennebunkport. They have a daughter.

Carson announced in 2021 that she was undergoing treatment for stage three breast cancer. She was initially misdiagnosed when her MRI results were misfiled under another woman's test results.

== Filmography ==
=== Film ===
| Year | Title | Role | Notes |
|---|---|---|---|
| 1986 | The Zero Boys | Trish | |
| 1987 | Who's That Girl | Denise - Wendy's Friend | |
| 1990 | Cartel | Donna Grey | |
| 1990 | Hollywood Heartbreak | Julie | |
| 1991 | Killer Tomatoes Strike Back | Kennedi Johnson | |
| 1991 | Kiss and Be Killed | Nora | |
| 2024 | A Wall Away | Teresa | |

=== Television ===
| Year | Title | Role | Notes |
|---|---|---|---|
| 1987 | Thirtysomething | Mother | Episode: "Weaning" |
| 1988 | Simon & Simon | Tawney Aldridge | Episode: "Cloak of Danger" |
| 1989 | Dallas | Elaine Eddy | 5 episodes |
| 1989 | Alien Nation | Celeste | Episode: "Fountain of Youth" |
| 1990 | Cheers | Ingrid | Episode: "Finally!: Part 1" |
| 1990 | Charles in Charge | Penny Hennesy | Episode: "Almost Family" |
| 1991 | Shades of LA | Heather | Episode: "Ten Little Thespians" |
| 1991 | Midnight Caller | Crystal DeKanter | Episode: "Play Blotto...and Die" |
| 1991-1993; 1997;1998 | General Hospital | Julia Barrett | Contract role; Guest appearances |
| 1994 | Ellen | Gwen | Episode: "Mrs. Koger" |
| 2002 | JAG | Cmdr. Carpenter | 3 episodes |
| 2015 | Club 5150 | Lydia | 4 episodes |
