= Teen Titans Go! & DC Super Hero Girls: Mayhem in the Multiverse =

Animated crossover superhero film

- DVD cover
- Directed by: Matt Peters; Katie Rice
- Written by: Jase Ricci
- Based on: Characters from DC
- Produced by: Jeff Curtis; James Ricci; James Tucker (supervising producer); Sam Register (executive producer)
- Starring: Greg Cipes; Scott Menville; Khary Payton; Tara Strong; Hynden Walch; Grey Griffin; Nicole Sullivan; Kimberly Brooks; Myrna Velasco; Kari Wahlgren
- Edited by: Michael G. Buck
- Music by: Michael Gatt
- Production companies: Warner Bros. Animation; DC Entertainment; Cartoon Network
- Distributed by: Warner Bros. Home Entertainment
- Release dates: May 24, 2022 (DVD & Blu-ray); May 28, 2022 (Cartoon Network)
- Running time: 79 minutes
- Country: United States
- Language: English

Teen Titans Go! & DC Super Hero Girls: Mayhem in the Multiverse is a 2022 American direct-to-video animated superhero comedy film and a crossover between the television series Teen Titans Go! and DC Super Hero Girls, which is adapted from the DC Comics superhero team of the same name, and the DC Super Hero Girls franchise. It is the first DC Super Hero Girls film in four years since 2018's DC Super Hero Girls: Legends of Atlantis, and the first one to center on the 2019 incarnation. It was released on DVD and Blu-ray on May 24, 2022, followed by a premiere on Cartoon Network on May 28. The film also served as the fourth Teen Titans Go! film, following Teen Titans Go! To the Movies, Teen Titans Go! vs. Teen Titans, and Teen Titans Go! See Space Jam, and also served as the series finale of the DC Super Hero Girls TV series.

== Plot ==
At the Teen Titans' base, Beast Boy finds an unusual crystal on the floor. The supervillain Control Freak then arrives, announcing that the Titans will have a new superhero crossover, so they all decide to watch the movie.

It depicts events from the Super Hero Girls' universe, in which they fight against their enemies, the Super Villain Girls, who escape through a portal that opened behind them. An Amulet was found by Lex Luthor, who used it to rescue the villains and form the Legion of Doom, planning to get rid of all superheroes by locking them in the Phantom Zone. Cythonna, the Kryptonian goddess of darkness, plagues, and suffering, was locked in the Amulet by her brother Rao and banished it to space years before. The Legion wreaks havoc through Metropolis. The girls gather in the park and find a Kryptonian rune with Cythonna's name inscribed on it. Supergirl goes to her cousin Clark to translate it; he ignores her, believing that Cythonna is just a legend.

The girls head to the Fortress of Solitude to search for information about Cythonna and her Amulet, but they are confronted by Superman robots, and then the Justice League. A fight ensues until Wonder Woman stops it and hands the crystals to Superman, deciding to leave the rescue plan in the hands of the League. Batgirl secretly steals the crystals with the information they needed. Meanwhile, Wonder Woman receives a secret call from Batman, asking her to meet at the Daily Planet, where he and Superman tell her to join them to stop Luthor and the Legion.

Meanwhile, the girls watch a message from Supergirl's uncle Jor-El, who mentions the Amulet. Cythonna plans to free herself from it by feeding on the souls of the wicked, using a Kryptonian vessel, and claiming the universe as her domain. Deducing that Cythonna is controlling Luthor, the girls try to call Wonder Woman to warn the League, but she does not answer.

Meanwhile, as the crystal of the Amulet slowly shatters, Cythonna grows stronger. The League soon falls into a trap set by the Legion. Superman is locked in a Kryptonite box, and the rest of the League is trapped in the Phantom Zone. Harley Quinn, having decided to quit the Legion and reunite with Batgirl, helps Wonder Woman escape. The girls dispute over the choices Wonder Woman made and dissolve the team. Feeling guilty, Wonder Woman returns to her old home, Themyscira.

Luthor announces publicly that the Legion will take over the world. Bumblebee sends an emergency call to her friends and encourages them to team up again. For her part, Harley leaves the girls behind, claiming that she is not interested in saving the world. At Themyscira, the girls reconcile with Wonder Woman and return with her to Metropolis. There, the United Nations is forced to give the world to the Legion. Cythonna traps Supergirl, planning to use her as her new host. The other girls try to get to the Zone with the help of Zatanna's dark magic, which accidentally strands them in the Titans' dimension.

The Titans help the girls fix Bumblebee's computer and offer the resources the girls need to jump between universes again, while Zatanna receives words of encouragement from Raven that help her accept her dark entity. Zatanna transports herself and the girls to their own universe.

At the Phantom Zone, the girls rescue their friends as Cythonna breaks free of the amulet. The girls, the Invinci-Bros, and the Justice League subdue the Legion of Doom. Supergirl pretends to surrender to Cythonna, who is eventually overpowered by the girls. Supergirl imprisons Cythonna inside a crystal, and aided by Zatanna, banishes Cythonna out of her universe.

Meanwhile, in the Titans' universe, it is revealed that Cythonna is possessing Control Freak to retrieve the crystal. The Titans foil her attempt to destroy their universe, and she is banished by Raven, ending up stranded in the Super Friends' dimension, where they plan to send the crystal back, but take one look at the Titans fighting over the remote and decide not to.

== Cast ==
- Greg Cipes as Beast Boy
- Scott Menville as Robin
- Khary Payton as Cyborg and narrator
- Tara Strong as Raven, Barbara "Babs" Gordon / Batgirl and Harleen Quinzel / Harley Quinn
- Hynden Walch as Starfire
- Grey Griffin as Diana Prince / Wonder Woman (both teenager and young) and Doris Zuel / Giganta
- Nicole Sullivan as Kara Danvers / Supergirl
- Kimberly Brooks as Karen Beecher / Bumblebee
- Myrna Velasco as Jessica "Jess" Cruz / Green Lantern
- Kari Wahlgren as Zee Zatara / Zatanna and Carol Ferris / Star Sapphire
- Will Friedle as Lex Luthor and Arthur Curry / Aquaman
- Keith Ferguson as Bruce Wayne / Batman
- Phil LaMarr as Barry Allen / The Flash, Carter Hall / Hawkman and John Stewart / Green Lantern
- Max Mittelman as Clark Kent / Superman
- Jessica McKenna as Garth Bernstein / Aqualad
- Alexander Polinsky as Control Freak
- Missi Pyle as Cythonna and Speaker of Nations
- Jason Spisak as Hal Jordan / Green Lantern
- Cree Summer as Selina Kyle / Catwoman and Queen Hippolyta
- Fred Tatasciore as Jor-El and Solomon Grundy

== Production ==
Teen Titans Go! & DC Super Hero Girls: Mayhem in the Multiverse was announced in October 2021 at DC FanDome.

== Release ==
The film was released on DVD and Blu-ray on May 24, 2022, followed by a premiere on Cartoon Network on May 28.

== Reception ==
Dillon Gonzales, writing for Geek Vibes Nation, gave the film a positive review, saying that "Teen Titans Go! & DC Super Hero Girls: Mayhem In The Multiverse is a sneaky crossover that promises more of the former than we actually get, but the meta-humor and decently endearing characters should keep you mostly entertained throughout. The film is a bit messy and chaotic, but this is in line with the tone of these light and amusing series".

=== Accolades ===
Tara Strong was nominated for Outstanding Achievement for Voice Acting in an Animated Television / Broadcast Production at the 50th Annie Awards.
