= Trick or Treat Scooby-Doo! =

- DVD cover
- Directed by: Audie Harrison
- Screenplay by: Audie Harrison; Laura Pollak; Daniel McLellan
- Story by: Daniel McLellan; Audie Harrison
- Based on: Characters by Hanna-Barbera Productions
- Produced by: Sam Register; Audie Harrison (executive producers)
- Starring: Frank Welker; Grey DeLisle; Matthew Lillard; Kate Micucci; Myrna Velasco; Anthony Carrigan
- Edited by: John Soares
- Music by: Ryan Shore
- Production company: Warner Bros. Animation
- Distributed by: Warner Bros. Home Entertainment (Studio Distribution Services)
- Release dates: October 4, 2022 (Digital); October 18, 2022 (DVD)
- Running time: 72 minutes
- Country: United States
- Language: English

Trick or Treat Scooby-Doo! is a 2022 American animated direct-to-video supernatural comedy horror mystery film produced by Warner Bros. Animation and distributed by Warner Bros. Home Entertainment. It is the thirty-seventh direct-to-video Scooby-Doo film and was released digitally on October 4, 2022, and was released on DVD on October 18, 2022.

== Premise ==
Mystery Incorporated are summoned to a Nepal ski resort under siege by a cat monster. After the gang captures it by triggering an avalanche, it's revealed to be one of the owners of the resort, trying to keep her step-mother out of the business. Mystery Inc. takes and analyzes a whisker from the cat costume, learning that it is made with the same materials as costumes used by villains in their previous mysteries. They determine that the costumes were made by the same person, Coco Diablo, a high-end Halloween costume designer. Scooby Doo and Shaggy disguise themselves as potential buyers of the recycled 10,000 Volt Ghost costume and after Coco offers to give them the 10,000 Volt Ghost costume if they kill Mystery Inc., she is caught and sent to prison.

A year passes with Fred, Daphne and Velma growing more depressed by the lack of truly difficult mysteries, while Shaggy and Scooby are having a much better time as they were able to relax due to the lack of danger. After solving a tax scheme only for the perpetrator to get away with it, Fred makes a wish in a wishing well for more mysteries.

The gang attends a local carnival and are attacked by a ghost that resembles Fred and blows up the Mystery Machine. They go to Coolsville Penitentiary to interview Coco and meet the warden, who allows Coco to leave with them.

After finding a clue at the carnival in the remains of their booth, they do research at the local library. At the library, they are attacked by ghosts, but escape and confront Trevor at his new shop when Coco determines that the costumes matched his style of design.

Trevor reveals that he sent four costumes of Victorian-era style to Coolsville Penitentiary and the gang discovers that Coco broke her heart monitor and escaped. They follow her to her factory and trap the ghosts with the alligator pit, revealing that the ghosts are robots in costumes.

Coco offers a false confession, but the gang sees through it and determines that the warden is holding Esteban hostage and is behind the whole thing. He confesses and is arrested, but when trying to assure Mystery Inc. that they were never in any real danger, he accidentally releases all the inmates previously apprehended by Mystery Inc. at the penitentiary where they escape. To round them up, the gang dresses up in costumes of criminals from their past cases. After re-capturing the inmates, Shaggy and Scooby reluctantly return the candy the inmates stole to the trick-or-treaters and Trevor gives them a large bag of candy while reveals himself to be a surfer using a disguise while Coco willingly returns to prison.

== Cast ==
- Frank Welker as Scooby-Doo, Fred Jones, Rudy, Count Nefario
- Grey DeLisle as Daphne Blake, Daisy, Musketeer #1, Olive
- Matthew Lillard as Shaggy Rogers, Craggly, Captain Cutler
- Kate Micucci as Velma Dinkley, Helga
- Myrna Velasco as Coco Diablo
- Dee Bradley Baker as Esteban, Mr. Wickles, Cat Man
- Jeff Bennett as Charlie Humdrum, Hank
- Anthony Carrigan as Trevor Glume
- Erin Fitzgerald as Library Kid, Superhero Girl and Musketeer #2
- David Lodge as Warden Collins, Harry the Hypnotist, Mayor Dudley
- Lara Jill Miller as Prisoner Costume Teen, Superhero Boy, Musketeer #3
- Candi Milo as Alice Dovely, Dinosaur Kid, Monster Kid
- Jenelle Lynn Randall as Librarian, Superboy
- Kevin Michael Richardson as Sheriff, Henry Bascombe, 10,000 Volt Ghost

== Music ==
The film's original score was composed by Ryan Shore.

== Release ==
Trick or Treat Scooby-Doo! was released digitally on October 4, 2022, and was released on DVD on October 18, 2022, by Warner Bros. Home Entertainment (through Studio Distribution Services).

The film made its TV premiere on Cartoon Network on October 14, 2022, at 7pm ET/PT, and then streaming on HBO Max the next day.

== Reception ==
In a review for Autostraddle, Heather Hogan called the film "A very funny movie for people who grew up on Scooby-Doo." James McDonald of Irish Film Critic gave the film 3/5 stars and said "those who enjoy Scooby-Doo will have a blast." Overall, the film has three reviews on the review aggregation website Rotten Tomatoes.

=== Depiction of Velma Dinkley ===
Trick or Treat Scooby-Doo! made headlines for depicting Velma Dinkley "crushing big time" on female character Coco Diablo, in accordance with long-held fan speculation that Velma was a lesbian/bisexual, a concept previously considered for depiction in the first theatrical live-action Scooby-Doo film Scooby-Doo (2002) and the TV series Scooby-Doo! Mystery Incorporated (2010–2013). Lesbian actress Hayley Kiyoko, who played Velma in the live-action television Scooby-Doo films directed by Brian Levant, said she was "happy for her". In response to speculation that Trick or Treat would lead to Velma being depicted as a lesbian in all subsequent Scooby-Doo media, Mindy Kaling clarified on International Lesbian Day that Velma would not be depicted as such in her adult-oriented metafictional HBO Max series Velma, instead involved in a "love quadrangle" with Fred, Daphne, and Shaggy, specifically with a crush on Fred.

== See also ==
- List of films set around Halloween
