= Karen M. Waldron =

American actress

- Born: Karen Mistal; March 20, 1961; Rochester, NY
- Known for: Return of the Killer Tomatoes
- Spouse: Jamie Waldron (October 1997 - present) Danie Visser (April 15, 1989 - ?) (divorced)
- Children: Two children - a daughter Nicolette by her first husband Danie Visser & a son Tyler by her second husband Jamie Waldron.

Karen Waldron (née Mistal) is an American film and television actress and producer.

Originally from upstate New York, she has studied with several notable conservatories including The Edgemar, The Improv, Darryl Hickman and The Charles Conrad Studio. Her credits include The New Adventures of Beans Baxter as well as a recurring role on Coach. Film credits include Space Cowboys, Return of the Killer Tomatoes, and Cannibal Women in the Avocado Jungle of Death. She was an executive producer of the Hallmark movie The Note.

== Filmography ==
=== Film ===
Year	Title	Role	Notes
1988	Return of the Killer Tomatoes	Tara Boumdeay	
1989	Another Chance	Candy	
1989	Cannibal Women in the Avocado Jungle of Death	Bunny	
1997	Bimbo Movie Bash	Bunny	Archive footage from Cannibal Women in the Avocado Jungle of Death
1997	Killing Midnight	Gina	
2000	Space Cowboys	Female Astronaut #2	

=== Television ===
Year	Title	Role	Notes
1987	Charles in Charge	Heidi	Episode: "Amityville"
1987	The New Adventures of Beans Baxter	Cake Lase	Six episodes
1989	The Tracey Ullman Show	Colett	One episode
1990	Valerie	Stacy Hanover	Episode: "The Best of Friends, Worst of Times"
1989-1992	Coach	Shari	Four episodes
1997	Baywatch Nights	Doctor	Episode: "The Eighth Seal"
1997	Men Behaving Badly	Pregnant Woman #1	Episode: "Special Delivery"
1998	Baywatch	Francine	Two episodes
1999	Three Secrets	Spencer's Mom	TV movie
2000	The Dukes of Hazzard: Hazzard in Hollywood	Roz	TV movie
2003	Dragnet	Laura Canrinus	Episode: "The Artful Dodger"

Additionally, Waldron has co-produced the TV movies At the Hands of Another, Inside the Circle, The Note and the TV series The Clinic.
