= Killer tomato =

Killer tomato may refer to:

- a monster from a comedy movie franchise, see Attack of the Killer Tomatoes (disambiguation)
- Debi Pelletier, American professional wrestler, better known by her ring name The Killer Tomato
- in naval jargon, an inflatable seaborne target for gunnery practice, named after the monster
