= The New Adventures of Beans Baxter =

American adventure comedy television series

- Created by: Savage Steve Holland
- Starring: Jonathan Ward
- Country of origin: United States
- Original language: English
- No. of seasons: 2
- No. of episodes: 17

Production
- Production locations: Vancouver, British Columbia and Richmond, British Columbia
- Running time: 25 minutes
- Production company: Savage Productions (in association with Twentieth Century-Fox Television)

Original release
- Network: Fox
- Release: July 18 – November 28, 1987

The New Adventures of Beans Baxter, promotional photograph, featuring Jerry Wasserman and Jonathan Ward

The New Adventures of Beans Baxter is an adventure/comedy television series that aired 1987 on the Fox television network. It was created by Savage Steve Holland, who also wrote and directed most of the 17 episodes. The title character was portrayed by Jonathan Ward, who won a "Best Young Actor Starring in a New Television Comedy Series" Young Artist Award for the role.

== Plot ==
The show revolved around the spy activities of Benjamin "Beans" Baxter, Jr., a Kansas teenager who had just moved with his parents and younger brother to Washington, D.C., as part of his father's (assumed) reassignment as an employee of the U.S. Postal Service.

After Beans witnessed his father's apparent assassination in the explosion of a bomb planted in Benjamin Sr.'s postal freighter, he was recruited by the mysterious "Number Two" (Jerry Wasserman). Number Two was an officer (and, presumably, the Deputy Director) of "the Network", a CIA-styled spy agency; Beans thus learned that his father was actually an agent of the Network, and that the older Baxter's Postal Service employment was his cover assignment. (The Network's main delivery of assignments for its agents was a system similar to what was seen on the spy comedy Get Smart! in the 1960s.) The main nemesis of the Network was a terror organization that called itself UGLI, for the Underground Government Liberation Intergroup, which was headed by the professional terrorist called Mr. Sue (Kurtwood Smith) and his second-in-command (Taylor Negron). The Network, however, considered Beans himself strictly a "place-holder" agent, and it would only allow him to work in its dangerous service till his father could be found and freed. Viewers were warned, as a result, to expect to see little of Benjamin Sr., since his prime purpose was to stay lost and trapped so the series might continue.

Additional episodes were intended to show Beans's mother Susan, wrongly believing herself to be a widow, re-entering the dating scene. This activity on her part was to have led to complications for Beans, who knew, as she did not, that hers was still a valid, legal marriage to a husband who was still alive, and would thus have had to turn away possible suitors to prevent his mother from accidentally committing bigamy. Moreover, for all Beans or Susan knew, any of those suitors might have been UGLI terrorists planning all manner of nefarious activities, such as possibly assassinating not only Susan, but also Beans. The series was cancelled before any of these developments could be explored.

Beans started a friendship with a classmate nicknamed Woodshop (Stuart Fratkin), and he later became attracted to a beautiful student nicknamed "Cake Lace" (Karen Mistal). In one episode, former Miss Universe Shawn Weatherly appeared as herself. (The opening scene had Beans catching her in the shower naked and trying to escape from UGLI's chief henchman, who wanted to kidnap her as part of an unknown experiment.)

== Cast ==
The supporting cast included Rick Lenz as Beans's father, Benjamin Sr.; Elinor Donahue as his mother, Susan; Scott Bremner as Scott "Scooter" Baxter, Beans's younger brother; and occasional guest appearances by Wendy O. Williams as Beans' part-time friend/enemy in the spy world.

The role was originally offered to David Spade, and he regretted turning it down per advice of his agents.

1x01/02 - Derek Shane (Lars), Bruce Wagner (Vlodia), Betty Philips (Mrs. Kindwater), Stephen E. Miller (Colonel), Douglas Tuck (Mr. Lucas), Tara Vessels (Newscaster)

1x03 - Kristin Cumming (Darla), David Longworth (UGLI Two)

== Episodes ==
=== Season 1 (1987) ===
No. overall	No. in season	Title	Directed by	Written by	Original release date
1	1	"Beans' First Adventure"	Savage Steve Holland	Savage Steve Holland	July 18, 1987
2	2	"Beans' First Adventure"	Savage Steve Holland	Savage Steve Holland	July 18, 1987
Benjamin Baxter, Jr., whose friends call him Beans, is a teenager, who after his family moves to Washington DC, becomes a secret agent. In the premiere episode, Beans witnesses his father's abduction. Beans fails to rescue his father, and the Network's "Number Two" informs him that he will only be allowed to continue working for the Network till his father is found and freed.
3	3	"Beans Meets Shawn Weatherly"	Savage Steve Holland	Savage Steve Holland	July 25, 1987
Darla surprises Beans with a visit at the same time he is asked to house a gorgeous Soviet agent.
4	4	"Beans Runs for President"	Savage Steve Holland	Savage Steve Holland	August 1, 1987
An assignment to save the President's daughter interferes with Beans' candidacy for class president of his high school.
5	5	"Beans and the Satanic Backwards Masking Conspiracy"	Savage Steve Holland	Savage Steve Holland	August 8, 1987
Beans investigates whether messages on records played backwards have a part in changes in the behavior of the son of the Network's "Number One" or director.
6	6	"Beans' Wicked and Awesome Adventures at College"	Savage Steve Holland	Savage Steve Holland	August 15, 1987
A case of mistaken identity hampers Beans' ability to discover if a student radical is involved with UGLI.
7	7	"Beans in Ski Heck"	Mary Beth Fielder	Martin Olson & Mary Jo Pritchard & Savage Steve Holland	August 22, 1987
On a ski vacation, Beans accidentally uncovers a scheme to kidnap diplomats.
8	8	"There's No Place Like Omsk"	Savage Steve Holland	Martin Olson & Mary Jo Pritchard & Savage Steve Holland	September 12, 1987
Beans meets with Svetlana, a defected Russian double agent who is severely homesick.

=== Season 2 (1987) ===
No. overall	No. in season	Title	Directed by	Written by	Original release date
9	1	"Beans Finds His Dad But...(Part 1)"	Savage Steve Holland	Savage Steve Holland	September 26, 1987
Beans locates his kidnapped father, but Mr. Sue hampers the rescue effort.
10	2	"Beans Finds His Dad But...(Part 2)"	Michael E. Steele	Savage Steve Holland	October 3, 1987
Beans's second effort to rescue his father falls short.
11	3	"Beans' Unpleasant Introduction to Modern Science"	Savage Steve Holland	Savage Steve Holland	October 10, 1987
HAP, a robot which Beans is testing for the government, runs amok, attacking children and animals, and ruining a meeting with Darla.
12	4	"Beans Goes to Camp"	Savage Steve Holland	Savage Steve Holland	October 17, 1987
After UGLI steals a nuclear warhead, so Beans goes undercover at a parasailing camp to find it.
13	5	"A Nightmare on Beans' Street"	Savage Steve Holland	Savage Steve Holland	October 31, 1987
Beans and his friends are set upon by a deadly pumpkin sent by UGLI's leader, Mr. Sue, and the Pumpkin Princess.
14	6	"Beans' Home Life Gets UGLI"	Savage Steve Holland	Andrew Katz & Larry Schulze & Savage Steve Holland	November 7, 1987
Hoping to coerce Beans' father Benjamin Baxter, Sr. to talk, an UGLI agent tries to get a photograph that will make it appear that Mrs. Baxter (Susan) is having an affair with him.
15	7	"Beans Under the Weather"	Tom Rowe	Andrew Katz & Larry Schulze	November 14, 1987
After Beans' younger brother Scott Baxter, called Scooter, invents a weather-making machine for a science fair, UGLI schemes to use it for their own ends.
16	8	"Beans Gets His Driver's License (and It Isn't Pretty)"	Tom Rowe	Rick Overton & Bruce Wagner and Savage Steve Holland	November 21, 1987
UGLI agents Jack and Henry attempt to stop Beans from getting his driver's license.
17	9	"Beans in Jungleland"	Savage Steve Holland	Savage Steve Holland	November 28, 1987
Beans infiltrates the Bad Seed gang when his brother Scooter is falsely accused of selling drugs.

== Production ==
The series was filmed entirely in and around Vancouver, British Columbia; in the episode "Beans Gets His Driver's License (And It Isn't Pretty)", the CN Tower located in Toronto is featured in the background. The show's theme and soundtrack were performed by jazz trumpeter Maynard Ferguson.
