= Shades of LA =

American syndicated TV series (1990–91)

- Genre: Crime drama
- Created by: William Bleich
- Starring: John D'Aquino; Warren Berlinger; Kenneth Mars
- Country of origin: United States
- Original language: English
- No. of seasons: 1
- No. of episodes: 20 (list of episodes)

Production
- Executive producers: Robert A. Papazian; James G Hirsch
- Producers: Richard J O'Connor; William Bleich
- Camera setup: Multi-camera
- Running time: 60 minutes
- Production company: Papazian-Hirsch Entertainment

Original release
- Network: Syndication
- Release: October 10, 1990 – April 6, 1991

Shades of LA is an American crime drama syndicated television series that aired from October 10, 1990, until April 6, 1991.

== Premise ==
While recovering from a gunshot wound, a Los Angeles detective finds that he can see the spirits of the dead trapped in limbo until their missions on Earth are complete.

== Cast ==
- John D'Aquino as Det. Michael Burton
- Warren Berlinger as Lt. Wesley
- Kenneth Mars as Uncle Louis Burton
- David L. Crowley as Jack Monaghan
- Brian Libby as Nick Santini
- Gale Mayron as Annie Brighton

== Episodes ==
No.	Title	Directed by	Written by	Original release date
1	"Rest in Peace"	Bob Sweeney	William Bleich	October 10, 1990
A dead astronaut contacts Michael. Guest stars: Ben Murphy, Greg Mullavey, John Dennis Johnston, Anthony Charnota, Conrad Bachmann, Szu-Ming Wang, Nicholas Shaffer and Agustine Lam
2	"The Wrong Man"	Jack Shea	Bill Taub	October 17, 1990
A deceased thief feels guilty for sending a man to death row. Guest stars: Ron Glass, Beverly Johnson, Michael Winslow, Bob Sweeney, Christopher Birt, E. Danny Murphy, Nicholas Phillips, Freddie Dawson and Daniel Faraldo
3	"Cooper's Coroner"	Jim Johnston	Jim Brecher	October 24, 1990
A baseball announcer framed a former rival for gambling and now wants to make peace with his adult son. Guest stars: Chuck McCann, Garrison Hershberger, Zelda Rubinstein, James Parks and Beverly Leech
4	"Concrete Evidence"	Nancy Malone	Ed Scharlach	October 31, 1990
The ghost of a union leader wants Burton to locate his missing corpse. Guest stars: Edward Winter, Conrad Janis, Frank Gorshin and Kimberley Kates
5	"Big Brother is Watching"	Nancy Malone	Brenda Lilly, Renee Palyo and Bruce Jacobs	November 7, 1990
A murdered ventriloquist returns to point out his killer. Guest stars: David Naughton, Terri Garber, Donny Most, Preston Maybank, Holly Wilkinson and Susan Ware
6	"Pointers from Paz"	David Jackson	Jerry Stahl and Bruce Cervi	November 14, 1990
A dead detective wants help with finding the police officer who framed him for corruption. Guest stars: Carmen Argenziano, Carrie Snodgress, Sal Lopez, Peter Murzik, Kenneth Edwards, Gina Spellman, Dan Sturdivant, Kristopher Logan, Bill Dearth and Lisa Marie Soble
7	"Where There's No Will There's a Weigh In"	Bob Sweeney	Randy Holland	November 21, 1990
The nephew of a recently deceased woman wants to keep the money that was set aside to her financially strapped senior centre. Guest stars: Janis Paige, Jeff Conaway, Mary Crosby, Ronnie Schell, Ray Walston, Juanita Moore, Dorothy Neumann and Toni O'Grady
8	"The Teacher from Hell"	Judith Vogelsong	Bruce Cervi, Tom Blomquist, Renee Palyo and Brenda Lilly	November 28, 1990
Michael's old high school science teacher wants him to solve the murder case of a reporter. Guest stars: Ray Stricklyn, Leigh J. McCloskey, Lonny Chapman, Marily Hassett, Jim Antonio, Will Nye, Mark Fauser and Michael Blakely
9	"Some Like It Cold"	Bob Sweeney	Renee Palyo and Brenda Lilly	December 5, 1990
A dead lawyer falls in love with Michael. Guest stars: Lee Purcell, Clarence Williams III, Jeff East, Alma Beltran, Susan Ware, Betty Lynn, Barry Kinyon and Gustavo Rex
10	"Dreams"	Steve Beers	Unknown	December 12, 1990
Guest stars: Marilyn Jones and Allyce Beasley
11	"Dead Dogs Tell No Tales"	Jerry Jameson	Bruce Cervi	January 8, 1991
Michael helps a dog that was accidentally killed in a bank robbery. Guest stars: Geoffrey Lewis, Casey Biggs, Allyce Beasley, Vincent Schiavelli, Marvin Kaplan and H. Ray Huff
12	"Send Up the Clowns"	Dennis Donnelly	Ed Scharlach	January 15, 1991
Michael investigates the murder of two clowns. Guest stars: Gregory Sierra, Melody Rogers, Lisa Rinna, Miguel Fernandes, Susan Tyrell, Chip Reynolds, Scott Land, Dick Monday and April Tatro
13	"Last Laugh"	Kevin Cremin	William Bleich	January 22, 1991
Guest stars: Stephen Furst, Cassie Yates, John McCann, Coleby Lombardo, Gary Lazer, Debi A. Monahan, Joseph Della Sorta and Roger Rook
14	"Burial Ground"	Sutton Roley	John Lansing and Bruce Cervi	January 29, 1991
Michael helps a Nevada police officer stop a robbery. Guest stars: Stephen Nichols, Robert Beltran, Dana Hill, Michael J. Pollard and L. Q. Jones
15	"Cross the Center Line"	Jim Johnston	Tom Blomquist	February 5, 1991
Michael is haunted by two biker ghosts from the 1950s. Guest stars: Chris Nash, Lycia Naff, Michael McGuire, Ritch Brinkley, William Smith and Vonte Sweet
16	"Til Death Do Us Part"	Chris Pechin	Brenda Lilly and Renee Palyo	February 9, 1991
Guest stars: Chad Everett, Elaine Joyce, Richard Narita, Michael Cole, Daniel Greene, Devon Ericson and Dean Butler
17	"Ten Little Thespians"	Chuck Bowman	William Bleich	February 16, 1991
Michael attends a murder mystery weekend and encounters a novelist who was really killed at the house. Guest stars: Crystal Carson, Fern Fitzgerald, Clive Revill, Dee Dee Rescher, Henry Woronicz, Kenny Johnson and Beverly Leech
18	"The Really Big Sleep"	Richard L. O'Connor	Bruce Rush	February 23, 1991
A private detective killed 50 years ago wants Michael's help with finding his killer. Guest stars: Don Stroud, Mary Fanaro, Stephen Elliott, Michael Anderson Jr., Joan Leslie, Susan Ware, Robert Broyles, Ted Mehous and Wiley Pickett
19	"Line of Fire (1)"	Jim Johnston	Unknown	March 30, 1991
The widow of Michael's former partner is stalked by a television evangelist. Guest stars: Sam J. Jones, Tawny Kitaen, Brian Bonsall, Michael Parks, Michael Boatman, James Nixon, Duke Moosekian, Vahan Moosekian, Ava Dupress and Kathleen Bonsall
20	"Line of Fire (2)"	Jim Johnston	Unknown	April 6, 1991
B.J.'s ghost helps Michael save Linda from Scarborough. Guest stars: Sam J. Jones, Tawny Kitaen, Michael Boatman, Duke Moosekian, Vahan Moosekian, Ava Dupress and Kathleen Bonsall
