= Edgar Allan Poe: Once Upon a Midnight =

Play

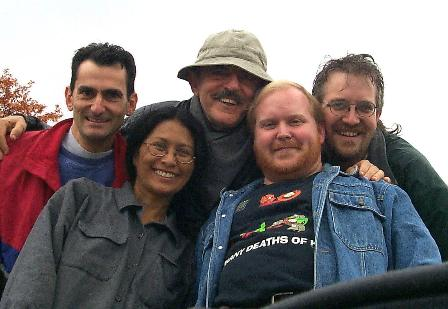
John Astin (center) with production crew of show

Edgar Allan Poe: Once Upon a Midnight is a one-man play written by Paul Day Clemens and Ron Magid. Its production run, beginning in 1998 and touring over 100 cities before ending in 2004, starred John Astin in the title role of Edgar Allan Poe.

In an interview, John Astin stated that "the truth has an element of the macabre in it" and that "Poe was a seeker of truth, and that made his work all the more beautiful and romantic. He dealt with life and death and the sometimes frightening realities they bear. He was not afraid to explore the darkness. He didn’t pretend it didn’t exist." Astin also said that the play gives the opportunity for the spirit of Poe to return to "straighten out all the forgeries and untruths told about him."

== The play ==
In writing for Playbill, Sean McGrath described the play as a mixture of Poe's poetry, the classic short stories "The Fall of the House of Usher" and "The Tell-Tale Heart" as well as Poe's personal turmoils. Such incidents include his childhood, his time in the military and the troubles he caused while at West Point, his marriage and his struggles to make his mark as a poet, publisher and writer. The script also contains a full recitation of Poe's poem "The Raven", from which the title of the play originates.

== Credits ==
- Written by Paul Day Clemens and Ron Magid
- Directed by Alan Bergmann
- Scenery, props and projections by John Boesche
- Lighting by Jason R. Beghtol
- Sound design by Rob Milburn and Michael Bodeen
- Original Music by Ian Freebairn-Smith
- Production stage manager – Brian J. L'Ecuyer
- Booking by Windwood Theatricals
