= Constantine J. Dillon =

Constantine Dillon
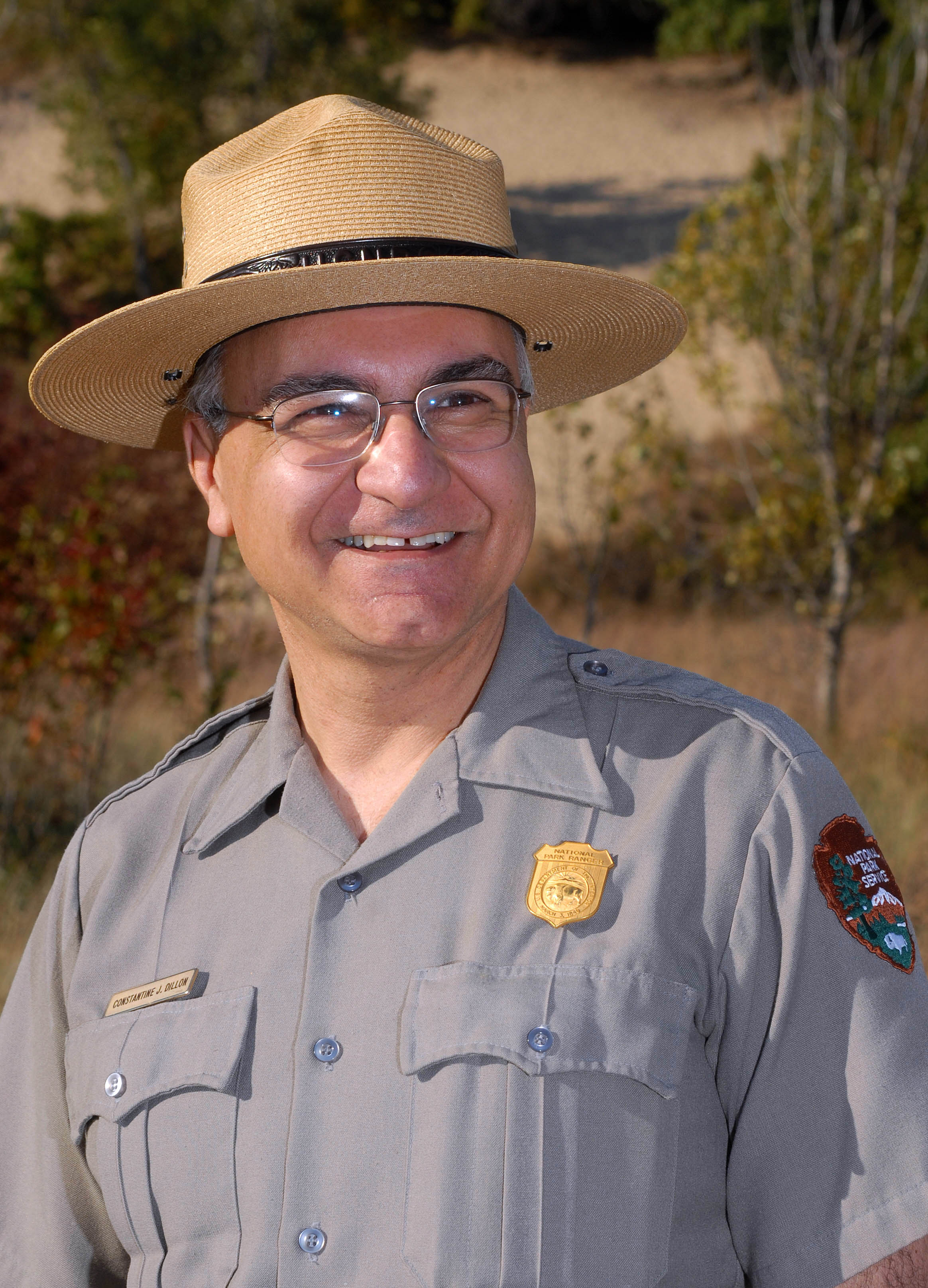
- Dillon at Indiana Dunes National Park
- Born: Norwich, Connecticut, U.S.
- Occupations: Writer, Actor, National Park Superintendent
- Years active: 1977–present

Constantine Dillon (born 1953), usually known as Costa, is a retired U.S. National Park Service Superintendent and a writer and actor of Greek ancestry. He is most famous as the creator of the film Attack of the Killer Tomatoes! and its sequels: Return of the Killer Tomatoes!, Killer Tomatoes Strike Back!, Killer Tomatoes Eat France, and Attack of the Killer Tomatoes: Organic Intelligence. He also wrote the film Happy Hour.

== Biography ==
=== Early life ===
Dillon, a Greek American (his grandfather's family name was Anglicized from Deligianis), was born in Norwich, Connecticut, to parents who were second-generation Greeks. There is a street in Norwich named after his grandfather who was a carpenter and who built houses there. His father, a career U.S. Marine, moved about the country and Dillon eventually ended up in San Diego

=== Film Career and Killer Tomatoes ===
Dillon began making films in high school with his friends John DeBello, Steve Peace, and Mike Grant. The group took 3rd place in the 1971 National Kodak Teenage Film Festival and won the 1972 Shasta Film Festival. They then established Four Square Productions, a film company in San Diego and began making sports films. The group later formed Killer Tomato Entertainment, Inc. which produced the four Killer Tomato films as well as Happy Hour.

Dillon created the concept of Killer Tomatoes as a short film in college. It was later made as a feature film, now famous, at a cost of less than $100,000. Finding a new audience as one of the first films to be available on VHS, the movie developed a cult following that led to three sequels, including Return of the Killer Tomatoes starring George Clooney. A cartoon show was aired on Fox 1990–1992 Attack of the Killer Tomatoes. The term "killer tomato" has often been used as shorthand for the fear of genetically engineered food and was used by the media extensively during the tomato salmonella outbreak in spring 2008.

Other feature films include Killer Tomatoes Strike Back (writer, actor), Killer Tomatoes Eat France (writer, actor), Attack of the Killer Tomatoes: Organic Intelligence (executive producer, writer, actor,), and Happy Hour (writer, actor, production design).

=== National Park Service Career ===
Dillon spent 35 years with the National Park Service, retiring in 2013. Dillon had a parallel career with his motion picture work and has worked in numerous national parks, including Gettysburg National Military Park, Eisenhower National Historic Site, Great Smoky Mountains National Park, Independence National Historical Park, and Hubbell Trading Post National Historic Site. He was the superintendent of the National Park Service Horace M. Albright Training Center and the interim Chief of Learning and Development for the National Park Service in 2006–2007. He formerly served as Superintendent of Homestead National Historical Park, Fire Island National Seashore, and Indiana Dunes National Park. He is a recipient of the National Parks Conservation Association's Stephen T. Mather award, the National Park Service Sequoia Award for outstanding contributions to park interpretation, the Secretary of the Interior's Award for Long-Term achievement in Diversity, and the Department of the Interior's Meritorious Service Award

While at Fire Island, he also received commendations from the New York State Legislature and the Suffolk County Legislature for his accomplishments there. He is a recipient of two awards from the Urban League for achievements in diversity. He is an admiral in the Nebraska Navy. In 2006 he received the National Association for Interpretation's Fellow Award.

Dillon is a graduate of the University of California, Davis and the University of Colorado. He is currently an Instructor for the Osher Lifelong Learning Institute at San Diego State University.
