= Attack of the Killer Tomatoes (1986 video game) =

- Developers: Fatman; Dobbin; Stuart Ruecroft
- Publisher: Global Software
- Platforms: ZX Spectrum, Amstrad CPC, MSX
- Release: 1986
- Genre: Shoot 'em up
- Mode: Single-player

Attack of the Killer Tomatoes is a shoot 'em up video game published in 1986 for the ZX Spectrum, Amstrad CPC and MSX. It is based on the 1978 comedy film of the same name. The player takes control of Wimp Plasbot, who works in a tomato puree plant, and must rid the plant of the mutated killer tomatoes, referred to in the title.

== Plot ==
Wimp Plasbot checked in at 9:00, and was just about to begin another day's work, when he discovered that the tomatoes had mutated. Wimp must destroy the killer tomatoes while ensuring that the pizza parlours are still supplied with puree from the bouncing ones.

== Gameplay ==
The player must control Wimp as he explores various isometric 3D rooms, and attempts to destroy the mutated killer tomatoes. There are three different types of tomato to be found in the factory: Killer tomatoes walk around on legs, in square patterns and will kill Wimp if they touch him. Wimp must destroy these tomatoes by crushing them with a hammer, which can be found somewhere in the factory. The second type of tomatoes bounce up and down. Wimp must stop them bouncing by squirting them with tomato sauce, then take them to the crusher to keep up the supply of tomato puree. The third type of tomatoes sit on the floor of the factory and, if Wimp touches them, they cause the time on the clock to accelerate for a short while. If "clocking off" time is reached before all the killer tomatoes have been destroyed then the player loses. Punch cards can be found around the factory which will give the player extra time.

== Reception ==
Reception

Review scores
Publication	Score
Crash	89%
Your Sinclair	8/10
ZX Computing	Great

Reviews were fairly positive, with CRASH giving it 89%, Your Sinclair rating it at 8/10, and ZX Computing rating it as Great.

CRASH said of the game "Despite the awfulness of the movie of the same name, AKT is an excellent game, though it does owe quite a lot to previous releases.", Rachael Smith from Your Sinclair said that "...in converting the film nominated Worst Vegetable Movie of all time Global has created a tie-in far better than the original deserved - and far better than many superior films have received!" and ZX Computing said that "Killer Tomatoes is quite a complex, and very professionally produced game that should keep you occupied for quite a while, but its similarity to all the other Knight Lore inspired titles left me feeling that it didn't really offer anything I hadn't seen before."
