= John Astin =

American actor (born 1930)

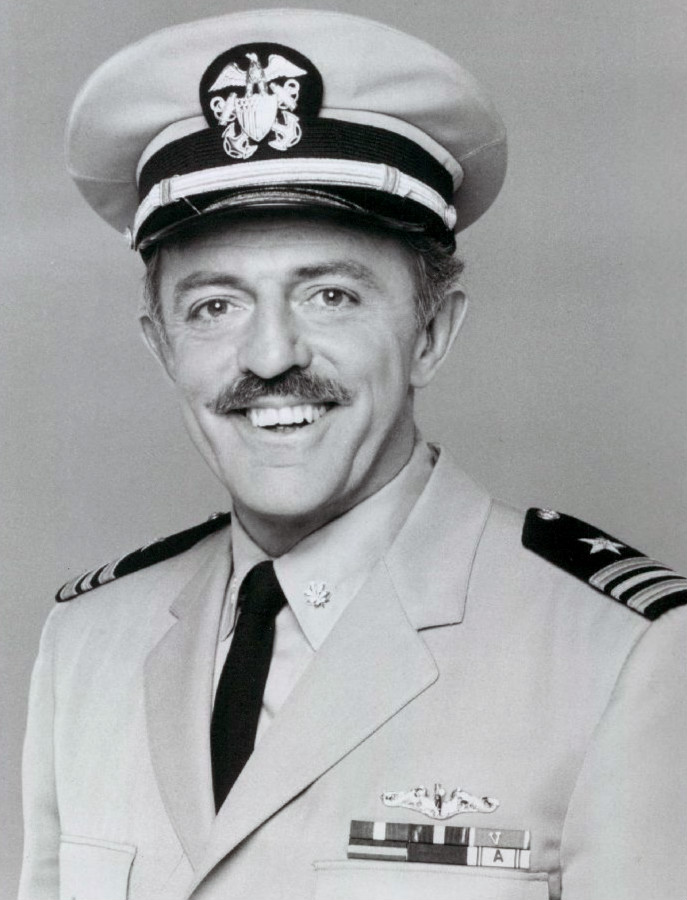
- Astin in a 1977 publicity photo for Operation Petticoat
- Born: John Allen Astin; March 30, 1930 (age 96); Baltimore, Maryland, U.S.
- Education: Washington & Jefferson College; Johns Hopkins University
- Occupation: Actor; director
- Years active: 1954–present
- Television: The Addams Family
- Spouses: Suzanne Hahn (m. 1956; div. 1972); Patty Duke (m. 1972; div. 1985); Valerie Sandobal (m. 1989)
- Children: 5, including Sean (adopted) and Mackenzie
- Parents: Allen V. Astin (father); Margaret Astin (mother)
- Relatives: Alexander Astin (brother)

John Allen Astin (born March 30, 1930) is an American actor and director who has appeared in numerous stage, television and film roles, primarily in character roles. He is widely known for his role as patriarch Gomez Addams in TV series The Addams Family (1964–1966), reprising the role in the television film Halloween with the New Addams Family (1977) and the animated series The Addams Family (1992–1993).

Astin starred in the TV film Evil Roy Slade (1972). Other notable film roles include West Side Story (1961), That Touch of Mink (1962), Move Over, Darling (1963), Freaky Friday (1976), National Lampoon's European Vacation (1985), Teen Wolf Too (1987) and The Frighteners (1996). Astin was nominated for the Academy Award for Best Live Action Short Film for his directorial debut, the comedic short Prelude (1968).

Astin has been married three times. His second wife was the actress Patty Duke, and Astin is the adoptive father of Duke's son, the actor Sean Astin.

== Early years ==
Astin was born on March 30, 1930, in Baltimore, Maryland, to Margaret Linnie (née Mackenzie) and Allen Varley Astin, a physicist, who was the director of the National Bureau of Standards (now the National Institute of Standards and Technology). At that time, Astin and his family resided on Battery Lane in Bethesda, Maryland. He graduated from Johns Hopkins University in 1952, after transferring from Washington & Jefferson College. Astin studied mathematics at Washington & Jefferson and then drama at Johns Hopkins; he was a member of the Phi Kappa Psi fraternity at Johns Hopkins.

== Career ==
Astin started his performing career in theater, making his first Broadway appearance as an understudy in Major Barbara (1954) and also did voice-over work for commercials. Astin appeared as "Ready-Money Matt" in the long-running off-Broadway production of Threepenny Opera (which began in 1954), starring Lotte Lenya. His first big film break came with a small role in West Side Story (1961), followed by roles in That Touch of Mink (1962), Move Over, Darling (1963).

During this period, Astin's talent for also playing comedy was spotted by actor Tony Randall, leading to guest starring roles on the sitcom Dennis the Menace, starring Jay North; The Donna Reed Show; and Harrigan and Son, starring Pat O'Brien, the first show broadcast on CBS and the latter two shows broadcast on ABC. In 1961, Astin appeared in the final episode of the ABC police drama The Asphalt Jungle. On April 7, 1961, he played the role of Charlie in the The Twilight Zone episode, "A Hundred Yards Over the Rim" which starred Cliff Robertson.

During the 1962–63 television season, Astin had his first lead in a television series, the ABC sitcom I'm Dickens, He's Fenster, co-starring with Marty Ingels. Astin played Harry Dickens to Ingels's Arch Fenster, as two trouble-prone carpenters. The series combined witty dialogue with moments of slapstick comedy. I'm Dickens, He's Fenster received critical raves, but was against two high-rated shows, Sing Along with Mitch on NBC and Route 66 on CBS. By the time I'm Dickens, He's Fenster gained a following and started winning its time slot, ABC had already canceled the show. A total of 32 episodes were produced.

Astin is widely known for The Addams Family, a popular sitcom that ran on ABC from 1964 to 1966, based on cartoons created by Charles Addams. Astin starred as Gomez Addams, the head of the macabre family. He later reprised the role of Gomez in the 1977 made-for-television film Halloween with the New Addams Family and voiced the role of Gomez in the animated series The Addams Family from 1992 to 1993. In the Canadian-American television series The New Addams Family, which ran from 1998 to 1999, Astin appeared as Grandpapa Addams, with the role of Gomez played by Glenn Taranto. With the death of Lisa Loring, who played Wednesday, as of January 2023, Astin is the last surviving cast member of The Addams Family.

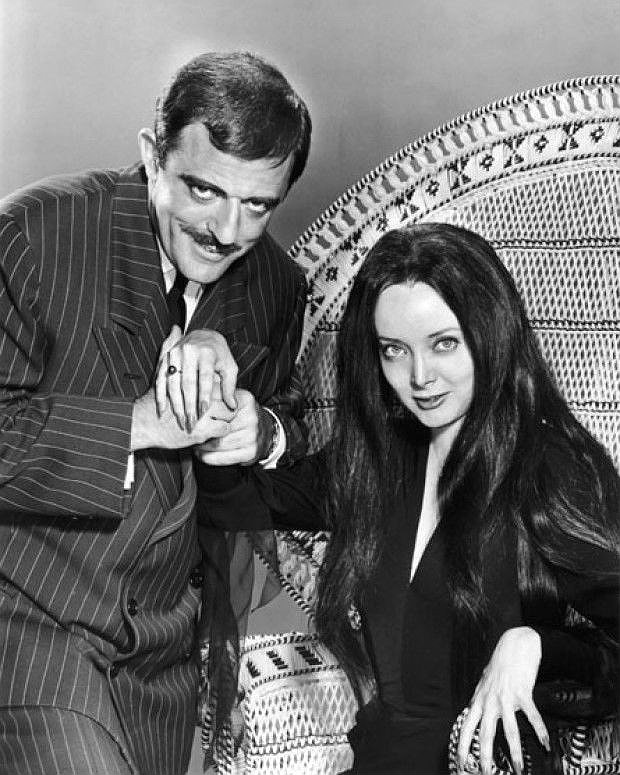
Astin alongside Carolyn Jones as Gomez and Morticia Addams in The Addams Family in 1964

Astin joined the retooled The Pruitts of Southampton (re-titled The Phyllis Diller Show) for the second half of the 1966–67 season, playing Diller's brother-in-law, Angus Pruitt. He also played the Riddler in the second season of Batman (Frank Gorshin returned for the third and final season.)

Astin portrayed the title character in the television film Evil Roy Slade (1972), starred as Bill Andrews in the film Freaky Friday (1976), and played submarine commander Matthew Sherman on the 1970s television series Operation Petticoat. He also made several appearances in the first two seasons of the popular mystery series Murder, She Wrote, as scheming real estate developer (and finally Sheriff) Harry Pierce, who ends up as the murderer in his last episode. He had a recurring role on the sitcom Night Court as Buddy Ryan, an eccentric former mental patient later revealed to be Judge Harry Stone's biological father; Buddy often ended his conversations with a big smile and the phrase,"...but I'm feeling much better now!"

Astin appeared in the films National Lampoon's European Vacation (1985), and Teen Wolf Too (1987). He played the regular role of Ed LaSalle on the short-lived Mary Tyler Moore sitcom Mary during the 1985–86 television season. He also guest starred on numerous television series, including appearances on Duckman, Homeboys in Outer Space, Jack Palance's ABC circus drama The Greatest Show on Earth, and a 1967 episode of Gunsmoke as Festus Haggen's cousin Henry.

Astin received an Academy Award nomination for Prelude, a short film that he wrote, produced, and directed. He was nominated for an Ace Award for his work on Tales from the Crypt, and received an Emmy Award nomination for the cartoon voice of Gomez on ABC-TV's The Addams Family. He also voiced the character Bull Gator on the animated series Taz-Mania. Astin served for four years on the board of directors of the Writers Guild of America, and has been active in community affairs in Los Angeles and Santa Monica.

Astin has continued to work in acting, appearing in a string of Killer Tomatoes films as Professor Gangreen and as Professor Wickwire in The Adventures of Brisco County, Jr. In 1996 he featured as The Judge, the ghost of an Old West gunslinger, in Peter Jackson's The Frighteners. He also has toured the one-man play Edgar Allan Poe: Once Upon a Midnight, written by Paul Day Clemens and Ron Magid. In a December 2007 Baltimore Examiner interview, Astin said of his acting experience:

We all struggle, and I had plenty of that, but I've had a great time. I've done hundreds of TV shows and 30 to 40 movies, and I love acting. I'm very happy having done the Poe. That's been really terrific.

Astin is a member of the board of directors of the Columbia Center for Theatrical Arts in Columbia, Maryland.

== Teaching ==
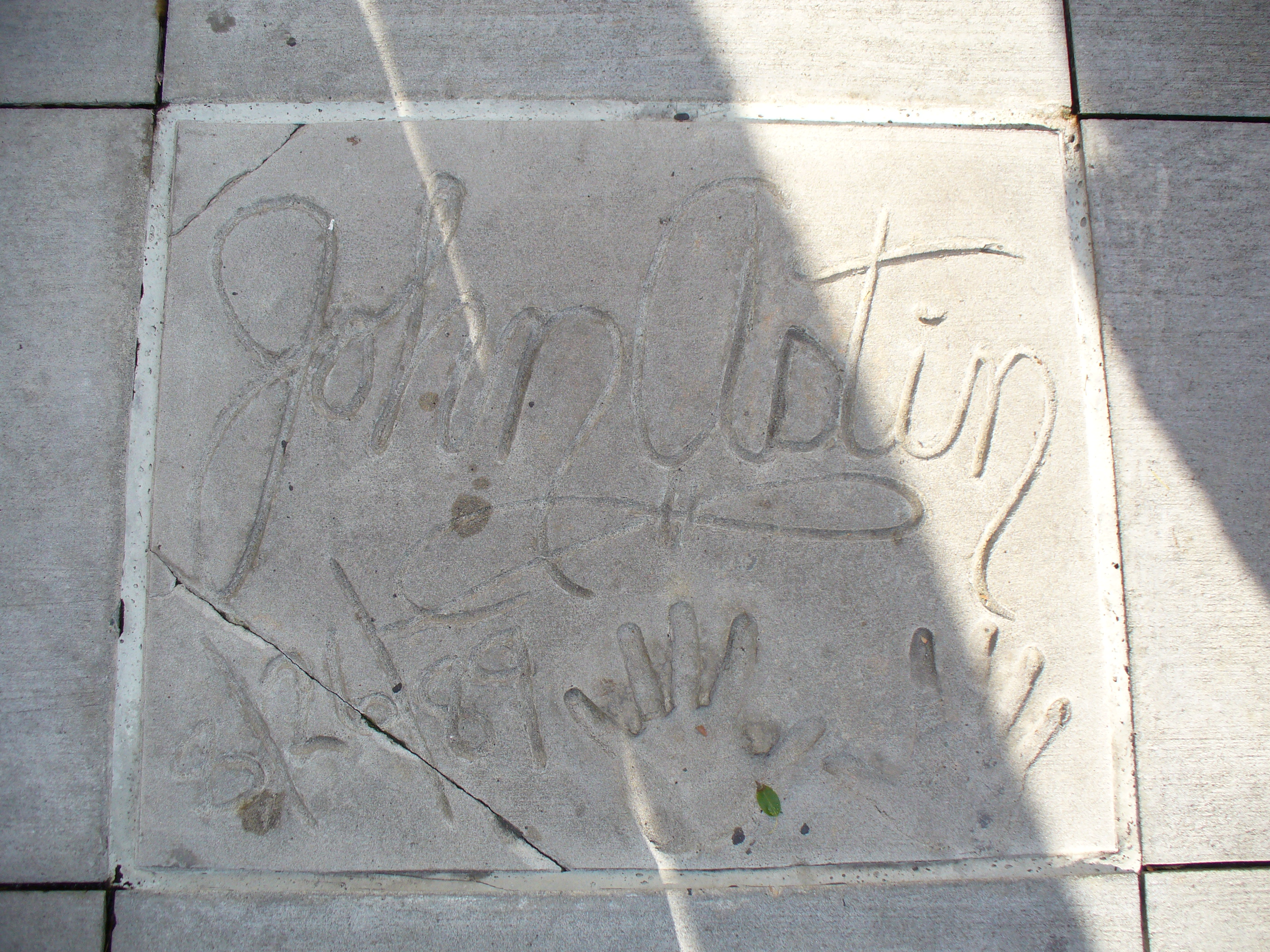
The handprints of John Astin in front of Hollywood Hills Amphitheater at Walt Disney World's Disney's Hollywood Studios theme park

Until his retirement in 2021, Astin was director of the Theater Arts and Studies Department and Homewood Professor of the Arts at Johns Hopkins University, his alma mater, which offers an undergraduate minor program. Commenting on his dual career, he said in 2007, "I don't know one major university that has a known actor teaching every day." Astin noted that he is one of only a handful to earn a drama degree from Hopkins. He taught at Hopkins from 2001 until 2021. Devika Bhise has been working with the university to create "The Astin Fund", an endowed chair that would allow theater to be a major at Johns Hopkins University for undergraduates.

== Personal life ==
Astin has five children; three (David, Allen, and Tom) with his first wife, Suzanne Hahn, and two with his second wife, actress Patty Duke – one adopted (Sean, Patty's son from an earlier relationship, whom Astin adopted during their marriage) and one biological (Mackenzie). Astin married Valerie Ann Sandobal in 1989, and they live in Baltimore, Maryland.

Astin is a vegetarian. He practices Nichiren Buddhism as a member of the worldwide Buddhist association Soka Gakkai International.

== Filmography ==
Astin's film and television roles include:

=== Film ===
| Year | Title | Role | Notes | Ref |
|---|---|---|---|---|
| 1960 | The Pusher | Detective | | |
| 1961 | West Side Story | Glad Hand, Social Worker Leading Dance | American romantic musical drama film directed by Robert Wise and Jerome Robbins.; The film is an adaptation of the 1957 Broadway musical of the same name, which in turn was inspired by William Shakespeare's play Romeo and Juliet. | |
| 1962 | That Touch of Mink | Mr. Everett Beasley | | |
| 1963 | Move Over, Darling | Clyde Prokey | The picture was a remake of a screwball comedy film, My Favorite Wife (1940), with Irene Dunne, Cary Grant and Gail Patrick.; In between these movies, a version entitled Something's Got to Give began shooting in 1962, directed by George Cukor and starring Marilyn Monroe and Dean Martin, but was never finished. | |
| 1963 | The Wheeler Dealers | SEC official | Released as Separate Beds in the UK | |
| 1967 | The Spirit Is Willing | Dr. Frieden | | |
| 1968 | Candy | Daddy / Uncle Jack | Sex farce film directed by Christian Marquand based on the 1958 novel by Terry Southern and Mason Hoffenberg, from a screenplay by Buck Henry.; The film satirizes pornographic stories through the adventures of its naive heroine, Candy, played by Ewa Aulin. | |
| 1969 | Viva Max! | Sergeant Valdez | Comedy film | |
| 1971 | Bunny O'Hare | Ad | American comedy film directed by Gerd Oswald.; Bette Davis was unhappy with the final film and sued AIP for $3.3 million in damages. | |
| 1972 | Un secuestro de locura | Star | Spanish-language film.; Directed by Cy Howard. | |
| 1972 | Evil Roy Slade | Evil Roy Slade | | |
| 1972 | Get to Know Your Rabbit | Mr. Turnbull | | |
| 1972 | Every Little Crook and Nanny | Vito Garbugli | | |
| 1972 | Wacky Taxi | Pepper | | |
| 1973 | The Brothers O'Toole | Michael O'Toole / Desperate Ambrose Littleberry | American comedy western film directed by Richard Erdman.; Michael O'Toole, a roguish gambler and con artist, and younger brother Timothy O'Toole, a womanizer, turn the sleepy mining town of Molybdenum, Colorado upside down. | |
| 1976 | Freaky Friday | Bill Andrews | American fantasy comedy film directed by Gary Nelson. | |
| 1985 | National Lampoon's European Vacation | Kent Winkdale (host of "Pig in a Poke") | Originally given the working title Vacation '2' Europe.; The second film in National Lampoon's Vacation film series. | |
| 1987 | Teen Wolf Too | Dean Dunn | American comedy film; The sequel to Teen Wolf. | |
| 1987 | Body Slam | Scotty the car dealer | American comedy film directed by Hal Needham. | |
| 1988 | Return of the Killer Tomatoes | Professor Mortimer Gangreen | A horror comedy film; The second film in the Attack of the Killer Tomatoes film series. | |
| 1989 | Night Life | Uncle Verlin | A horror comedy film | |
| 1990 | Gremlins 2: The New Batch | Janitor | | |
| 1990 | Killer Tomatoes Strike Back | Professor Mortimer Gangreen | The third film in the Attack of the Killer Tomatoes film series. | |
| 1991 | Killer Tomatoes Eat France | Professor Mortimer Gangreen | The fourth film in the Attack of the Killer Tomatoes film series. | |
| 1993 | Stepmonster | Minister | Direct-to-video film | |
| 1994 | The Silence of the Hams | The Ranger | Italian: Il Silenzio dei Prosciutti; Parody film of many popular thriller and horror films, notably The Silence of the Lambs and Psycho. | |
| 1994 | Huck and the King of Hearts | Zach | | |
| 1996 | The Frighteners | The Judge | New Zealand-American horror comedy fantasy film directed by Peter Jackson and co-written with Fran Walsh. | |
| 2001 | Betaville | President Sender | | |
| 2006 | What the Bleep!?: Down the Rabbit Hole | Dr. Quantum | Voice | |
| 2015 | Starship II: Rendezvous with Ramses | Professor Peabody | | |
| 2026 | Attack of the Killer Tomatoes: Organic Intelligence | Professor Mortimer Gangreen | The fifth film in the Attack of the Killer Tomatoes film series. | |

=== Television ===
| Year | Title | Role | Notes | Ref |
|---|---|---|---|---|
| 1960 | Maverick | Joe Lambert | Episode: "The Town That Wasn't There" (S 4:Ep 3) | |
| 1961 | The Twilight Zone | Charlie | Episode: "A Hundred Yards Over the Rim" (S 2:Ep 23) | |
| 1962 | 77 Sunset Strip | Martin Grosch | Episode: "Dress Rehearsal" (S4:Ep36) air: 05/25/1962 | |
| 1962 | Ben Casey | Nat Morris | Episode: "Preferably, the Less-Used Arm" (S 1:Ep 29) | |
| 1962–1963 | I'm Dickens, He's Fenster | Harry Dickens | Main role | |
| 1964–1966 | The Addams Family | Gomez Addams | Main role | |
| 1967 | The Pruitts of Southampton | Rudy Pruitt | Main role; The show was based on the novel House Party (1954) by Patrick Dennis. | |
| 1967 | Batman | The Riddler | 2 episodes | |
| 1967 | The Wild Wild West | Count Nikolai Sazanov | Episode: "The Night of the Tartar" | |
| 1967 | The Flying Nun | Father Lundigan | Episode: "Flight of the Dodo Bird" | |
| 1967 | Gunsmoke | Henry Haggen | Episode: "Hard Luck Henry" (S 13:Ep 7) | |
| 1968 | Death Valley Days | Jesse Martin | Episode: "The Gold Mine on Main Street" (S 16: Ep 20) | |
| 1969 | Bonanza | Abner Willoughby | Episode: "Abner Willoughby's return" (S 11:Ep 13) | |
| 1971 | The Odd Couple | Beau Buffingham | Episode: "Oscar's New Life" (S 1:Ep 21) | |
| 1971 | Two on a Bench | Dr. Stanley Remington | ABC Movie of the Week | |
| 1971–1972 | Night Gallery | Jonathan, Randy Miller, Munsch | 3 episodes | |
| 1972–1978 | Insight | Guest star | 4 episodes | |
| 1972 | The New Scooby-Doo Movies | Gomez Addams | Voice, episode: "Wednesday Is Missing" (S 1:Ep 3) | |
| 1972–1973 | McMillan & Wife | Sykes | 3 episodes | |
| 1973 | The Partridge Family | Sydney Rose | Episode: "The Mad Millionaire" | |
| 1973 | Circle of Fear | Fred Colby | Episode: "The Graveyard Shift" | |
| 1974 | Skyway to Death | Andrew Tustin | ABC Movie of the Week | |
| 1974 | Only with Married Men | Dr. Harvey Osterman | ABC Movie of the Week | |
| 1975 | The Dream Makers | Manny Wheeler | Television film | |
| 1975– 1979 | Welcome Back, Kotter | Museum curator | Recurring role | |
| 1976 | Police Story | Dr. Milford | Episode: "Firebird" (S 3:Ep 18) | |
| 1977 | Halloween with the New Addams Family | Gomez Addams | Television film | |
| 1977–1978 | Operation Petticoat | Lt. Cmdr. Matthew Sherman | Main role | |
| 1977–1980 | Captain Caveman and the Teen Angels | Additional Voices | Recurring role | |
| 1978 | The Love Boat | Dave, The Hermit | Episode: "Marooned" (S 2:Ep 1) | |
| 1978 | Fantasy Island | Charles D. Preston | Episode: "The Beachcomber / The Last Whodunit" (S 2:Ep 3) | |
| 1984 | The Facts of Life | Vito Miles | Episode: "The Summer of '84" (S 6:Ep 1) | |
| 1984 | Diff'rent Strokes | C.W. | Episode: "A Haunting We Will Go" (S 7:Ep 8) | |
| 1984 | Simon & Simon | Uncle Ray Simon | Episode: "Revolution #9 1/2" (S 4:Ep 12) | |
| 1984–1990 | Night Court | Buddy Ryan, Kenny | Recurring role | |
| 1984 | Murder, She Wrote | Ross Hayley, Harry Pierce, Fritz Randall | 5 episodes | |
| 1985–1986 | Mary | Ed LaSalle | Main role | |
| 1985 | Riptide | Baxter Bernard | Episode: "Baxter and Boz" (S 2:Ep 13) | |
| 1985 | Otherworld | Akin | Episode: "Mansion of the Beast" (S 1:Ep 7) | |
| 1986 | Mr. Boogedy | Neil Witherspoon | Television film | |
| 1987 | St. Elsewhere | Kevin | Episode: "Visiting Daze" (S 5:Ep 14) | |
| 1987 | The Charmings | Jack/The Devil | Episode: "The Witch is of Van Oaks" (S 2:Ep 3) | |
| 1987–1988 | Webster | Uncle Charles | 2 episodes | |
| 1988 | Charles in Charge | Uncle Joe | Episode: "Pickle King of New York" (S 3:Ep 14) | |
| 1989 | The Saint: The Blue Dulac | George Lafosse | Television film | |
| 1990 | Attack of the Killer Tomatoes | Dr. Putrid T. Gangreen | Voice, main role | |
| 1991 | Eerie Indiana | Radford | Recurring role | |
| 1991 | Taz-Mania | Bull Gator | Voice, recurring role | |
| 1991 | Father Dowling Mysteries | Manager of Gun Club | Episode: "The Priest Killer Mystery" (S 3:Ep 16) | |
| 1991 | They Came from Outer Space | Neville Nessen | Episode: "Sex, Lies and UFOs, part 2" (S 1:Ep 20) | |
| 1991 | Tales from the Crypt | Nelson Halliwell | Episode: "Top Billing" (S 3:Ep 5) | |
| 1992–1993 | The Addams Family | Gomez Addams | Voice, main role: Animated series based on the eponymous comic strip characters.; The series' development began in the wake of the successful 1991 Addams Family feature film.; It was the second-to-last Hanna-Barbera-produced show to premiere on ABC. | |
| 1993 | The Adventures of Brisco County, Jr. | Professor Wickwire | 7 episodes | |
| 1993–1994 | Problem Child | General Pierre Habib-Johnson | Voice, recurring role | |
| 1994–1997 | Duckman | Terry Duke Tetzloff | Voice, recurring role | |
| 1994 | Bonkers | The Mole | Episode: "Stressed to Kill" (S 3:Ep23) | |
| 1994 | Burke's Law | Alexander | Episode: "Who Killed Alexander the Great?" (S 1:Ep 6) | |
| 1994 | Mad About You | Himself | Episode: "Up All Night" (S 2:Ep 23) | |
| 1994 | Step by Step | George Humphries | Episode: "The Ice Cream Man Cometh" (S 4:Ep 9) | |
| 1994 | Aaahh!!! Real Monsters | Doctor | Voice, episode: "Monstrous Make-Over / A Wing and a Scare" (S 1:Ep 4) | |
| 1994–1995 | Step by Step | George Humphries | 2 episodes | |
| 1994–1995 | Aladdin | Sydney | Voice, 2 episodes | |
| 1996 | The Nanny | Dr. Roberts | 2 episodes | |
| 1996 | Quack Pack | Mr. Roborson | Voice, episode: "The Unusual Suspects"(S 1:Ep 15) | |
| 1997 | Homeboys in Outer Space | Rhymer | Episode: "The Adventures of Ratman and Gerbil or, Holy Homeboys in Outer Space" (S 1:Ep 21) | |
| 1997 | Johnny Bravo | Scientist 1/Blind Man | Voice, episode: "Jumbo Johnny / The Perfect Gift / Bravo, James Bravo" (S 1:Ep 10) | |
| 1997 | Pinky and the Brain | Grover Whalen | Voice, episode: "Mice Don't Dance" (S 3:Ep 11) | |
| 1998–1999 | The New Addams Family | Grampapa Addams | 2 episodes | |
| 1998–1999 | Recess | Supt. Skinner, The Judge | Voice, 4 episodes | |
| 1999 | The Hughleys | Guest star | Episode: "Storm o' the Century" (S 1:Ep 17) | |
| 1999 | The Wild Thornberrys | Bangaboo, Pingah | Voice, episode: "The Great Bangaboo" (S 1:Ep 17) | |
| 2000 | The Strip | Orson Bates | Episode: "I Wear My Sunglasses At Night" (S 1:Ep 9) | |
| 2000 | Becker | Richard Wilson | Episode: "All the Rage" (S 2:Ep 15) | |
| 2001 | As Told By Ginger | Dave Bishop | Voice, 2 episodes | |
| 2004–2007 | Higglytown Heroes | Santa Claus | Voice, 2 episodes | |
| 2005 | School of Life | Stormin' Norman Warner | Television film | |
| 2006 | My First Time | Himself | Episode: "Something About Mary" (S 1:Ep 1) | |
| 2017 | Justice League Action | Uncle Dudley | Voice, episode: "Captain Bamboozle" (S 1:Ep 49) | |
