= Myrna Velasco =

American voice actress (born 1988)

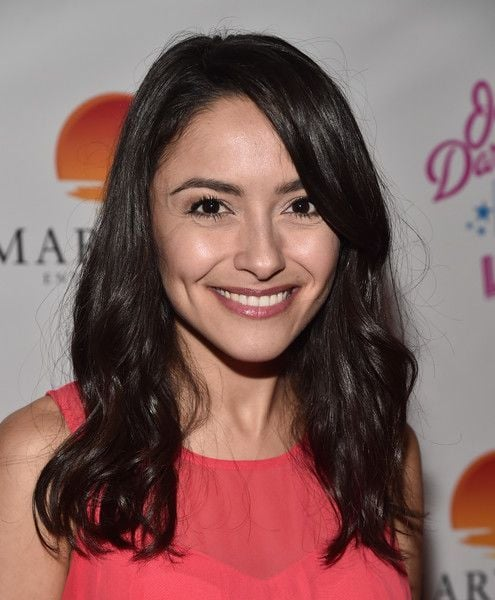
- Velasco in 2015
- Born: Myrna García Velasco; March 2, 1988 (age 38); Los Angeles
- Citizenship: United States
- Occupation: Voice actress
- Years active: 2010–present
- Television: DC Super Hero Girls; Elena of Avalor; Star Wars Resistance; Primos

Myrna García Velasco is an American voice actress. She is best known for voicing Jessica Cruz / Green Lantern in DC Super Hero Girls, Carla Delgado in Elena of Avalor, Torra Doza in Star Wars Resistance, and Tater Ramírez-Humphrey in Primos.

== Early life ==
Velasco was born in Los Angeles. She called herself as a "Mexican girl from L.A." in an interview at the May 2019 Star Wars Celebration. She was born with the name "Myrna García Velasco." In an interview in July 2025, Velasco said she came from a "really big Mexican family" in L.A. and liked "one-upping" her big sister. On social media she said that she grew up as a "Mexican American in a Whyte American neighborhood" without any community support, and claimed to have been bullied in school for her food choices, skin color, and told not to speak her "native language."

In 2010, she played Nicki in the film The Drive-By Chronicles: Confession of a Gangster. Her first voice role would be as voiced CJ in Descendants: Wicked World. Prior to that role, she played Ms. Garcia in Jessica Darling's It List.

== Career ==
=== DC Super Hero Girls ===
In 2019, Velasco began one of her well-known roles, as Jessica Cruz / Green Lantern, a protagonist of DC Super Hero Girls. The series creator Lauren Faust would describe the character as a "woke teen" whose powers are limited by her personal ideals as a vegetarian and a pacifist.

Velasco told Comics Beat that she tapped into her own anxiety and clinical depression when voicing the character, said she was "lucky enough" to work on the show, and opined that voicing the character inspired her to be "as open as possible". The publication described Velasco as a "relative newcomer in the voiceover industry", noted her voice roles for Elena of Avalor and Star Wars Resistance, and said it was fitting to have her play Jessica Cruz, a character who had been "gaining mainstream popularity both in comics and other media since her debut a few years ago." Velasco would later state that she gave her "own spin" to Cruz's character, but didn't own the character because others had voiced the character before her and was inspired by a live-action depiction of Cruz in Doom Patrol, calling it grounded and real, and worked with Phil LaMarr when beginning to voice the character.

Velasco would voice the same character in video games, and animated shorts. She voiced the same character in the 2022 film Teen Titans Go! & DC Super Hero Girls: Mayhem in the Multiverse. She later appeared on panels at WonderCon, and other conferences, with other voice actors and crew from the series.

=== Animated series ===
Apart from her voice role for DC Super Hero Girls, she is known for voicing two recurring characters in other series, specifically Carla Delgado in Elena of Avalor, from 2017 to 2020, and Torra Doza in Star Wars Resistance, from 2018 to 2020. In the latter series, the character had a prominent role, especially in the show's second season. She was interviewed about the role on "Friends of the Force", a Star Wars fan podcast in which she talked about her voice acting career, "importance of family," representation within the Star Wars franchise, and other topics. The show's art director, Amy Beth Christenson, also said that one of the character's outfits was "inspired by the jacket that Leia wears in Echo Base on Hoth." Velasco would attend a special premiere of the Star Wars: The Rise of Skywalker in Hollywood, California, in December 2019, as a special guest.

From 2020 to 2022, Velasco voiced a villain, Escarlata La Pirata, in Santiago of the Seas, which she described as a "wholesome fun show" and said her character is based of Scarlett O’Hara in Gone with the Wind. She also stated that character was "very dramatic and silly." In 2021, Velasco voiced Lucia in the third season of Madagascar: A Little Wild. Velasco said that the series had been her "favorite thing to work on" and that she was very excited for it. She would return for later seasons of the series.

In 2022, Velasco voiced Coco Diablo, a girlfriend of Velma Dinkley in the film Trick or Treat Scooby-Doo!. The character, said to be the "head of the notorious costume crime syndicate behind the creepy costumes" would confirm that Velma was a LGBTQ character. Also in 2022, Velasco voiced Wonder Girl and Lara in Batman and Superman: Battle of the Super Sons.

In June 2023, it was announced that Velasco would be the voice of Tater Ramírez-Humphrey, the 10-year-old protagonist of Primos. Following criticism of the show's trailer on social media, including from some Latinos and Mexicans, Velasco stated on her Instagram that the Spanish language was forced on people in Latin America by the conquistadors and defended the series.

In July 2024, the series creator, Natasha Kline later said that Velasco's audition for Tater had a "weird inflection" and that she read lines like "no one else," noting that Velasco was excited to audition because in her view this show reflected her family, story, and ethnicity, and said she felt like she was the character, having a deep connection to the material. The same month, Velasco told ABC11 that she felt supported by the show's voice actors, and was amazed to be working with people like Melissa Villaseñor and Cheech Marin, saying she was "mostly...just freaking out" as a result. In June 2025, it was confirmed that the Primos would not be returning for a second season and had ended production.

In 2023, Velasco voiced two characters in another Disney series, Hailey's On It!: Mrs. Sanchez and Gloria, in the episode "Kristine-ceañera," calling it an episode with "some wholesome laughs about the hardest and best birthday a Latina teenager can have," and was proud to voice Mrs. Sanchez. In August 2024, Velasco voiced a character in the second season of Big Nate named Juniper.

=== Video game voices and other work ===
In 2021, Velasco played Cristina Romo in the short film Enough Room. The year before, she voiced Aranna Starseeker in Hearthstone: Heroes of Warcraft, saying she would use her "my school Shakespeare" skills in voicing the character, and noted the challenges in the voice role. That same year, 2020, in an episode of the live-action series, Sydney to the Max, Velasco would be a guest star, named Mimi.

Velasco voiced Roka in the video game Concord in 2024, one of her many video game voice roles, with other credits including characters in Hearthstone, World of Warcraft, and Final Fantasy VII Rebirth. She voiced Wren in a VR game named Behemoth the same year. She would later say that Wren was one of the hardest characters she had ever voiced, due to having to keep her voice soft and low.

At Comic Con in July 2025, Velasco attended a panel with others who will be part of the Attack of the Killer Tomatoes: Organic Intelligence, an American comedy horror film in development, in which she will be playing a character.

== Personal life ==
In August 2024, Velasco wrote, on National Latina Day, that she was "proud to be Latina" and was proud of her "roots as a culturally Mexican person with roots in this land that is older than a country's boarder [sic]." In July 2025, Velasco noted, in an interview, that she has a pet cat. She is also Indigenous and a member of SAG-AFTRA.

== Filmography ==
Year	Title	Role	Notes	Ref
2010	The Drive-By Chronicles: Confession of a Gangster	Nicki		
2017	Jessica Darling's It List	Ms. Garcia		
2017	Descendants: Wicked World	CJ	Voice only	
2017-2020	Elena of Avalor	Carla Delgado	Voice only	
2018-2020	Star Wars Resistance	Torra Doza	Voice only	
2019-2022	DC Super Hero Girls	Jessica Cruz / Green Lantern	Voice only	
2020	Sydney to the Max	Mimi	Guest star	
2020-2022	Santiago of the Seas	Escarlata La Pirata	Voice only	
2020	Enough Room	Cristina Romo		
2021	Madagascar: A Little Wild	Lucia	Voice only	
2022	Teen Titans Go! & DC Super Hero Girls: Mayhem in the Multiverse	Jessica Cruz / Green Lantern	Voice only	
2022	Trick or Treat Scooby-Doo!	Coco Diablo	Voice only	
2022	Batman and Superman: Battle of the Super Sons	Wonder Girl	Voice only	
2022	Batman and Superman: Battle of the Super Sons	Lara	Voice only	
2023	Hailey's On It!	Mrs. Sanchez	Voice only	
2023	Hailey's On It!	Gloria	Voice only	
2024-2025	Primos	Tater Ramírez-Humphrey	Voice only	
2024	Big Nate	Juniper	Voice only	

== Video games ==
Year	Title	Role	Notes	Ref
2020	Hearthstone: Heroes of Warcraft	Aranna Starseeker	Voice only	
2024	Concord	Roka	Voice only	
2024	Behemoth	Wren	Voice only	
