= Attack of the Killer Tomatoes (TV series) =

- Genre: Animation; Comedy horror; Science fiction
- Based on: Characters created by John DeBello; J. Stephen Peace; Costa Dillon
- Developed by: Richard Mueller
- Written by: Richard Mueller (season 1); Flint Dille (season 2)
- Directed by: Karen Peterson
- Starring: John Astin; Thom Bray; S. Scott Bullock; Cam Clarke; Christian Guzek; Maurice LaMarche; Chuck McCann; Rob Paulsen; Neil Ross; Susan Silo; Kath Soucie
- Composers: Haim Saban; Shuki Levy; John Bello
- Country of origin: United States
- Original language: English
- No. of seasons: 2
- No. of episodes: 21

Production
- Executive producers: John De Bello; J. Stephen Peace; Joe Taritero
- Producers: Boyd Kirkland (season 1); Richard Trueblood (season 2)
- Running time: 23 minutes
- Production companies: Four Square Productions; Fox Children's Productions; Marvel Productions

Original release
- Network: Fox (Fox Kids)
- Release: 8 September 1990 – 23 November 1991

Attack of the Killer Tomatoes is an American animated television series based on the 1978 film Attack of the Killer Tomatoes and its 1988 sequel Return of the Killer Tomatoes. The series aired on Fox Kids from 8 September 1990 to 23 November 1991. Repeats aired on Fox in 1992 and 1996, and on Fox Family from 1998 to 2000.

The show, a sequel to the original film, is about the mad scientist Dr. Putrid T. Gangreen and his associate Igor Smith turning the tomatoes in the town of San Zucchini into monsters. The evil doctor was battled by young Chad Finletter, and his friends Tara Boumdeay (secretly a human/tomato hybrid pretending to be a teenage girl) and F.T., a "Fuzzy Tomato" pretending to be a dog. The second season is known for being the first Saturday Morning cartoon series to be computer-animated.

Ownership of the series passed to Disney in 2001 when Disney acquired Fox Kids Worldwide, which also includes Marvel Productions.

== Origin ==
The original film Attack of the Killer Tomatoes was released by Four Square Productions in 1978. A parody of the giant menace movies of the 1950s, it became a cult hit and predated the movie-spoofing disaster film Airplane! by two years.

The Killer Tomatoes might have remained in that genre had it not been for an unlikely intervention from an equally unlikely source. During the 1986–1987 season of Muppet Babies, there was a segment in the episode "The Weirdo Zone" upon which Baby Fozzie deals with how he once faced an 'Attack of the Silly Tomatoes'. The segment used clips from the movie and concluded with Baby Fozzie using a giant-sized ketchup bottle to capture the Silly Tomatoes (he told bad jokes and the large tomatoes launched themselves at him, only to be caught inside the bottle when he ducked out of the way). It became one of the higher-rated episodes of the season, so much that New World Pictures (the owner of Marvel Productions, which made Muppet Babies) approached Four Square about making a sequel to Attack of the Killer Tomatoes.

Four Square had never intended to make a sequel but when New World approached them with a two-million dollar budget towards filming a potential sequel, John De Bello, Costa Dillon and Stephen Peace got to work on crafting a script. The resulting film, Return of the Killer Tomatoes, was a surprise success.

New World was pleased with the results, and the company decided to duplicate the results of the film with an animated series aimed at a younger audience. Tweaking various characters and ideas from both Attack and Return, Attack of the Killer Tomatoes: The Series was born and debuted as one of the first Saturday morning cartoons on the Fox Children's Network in the fall of 1990.

There were many inside jokes to popular television series and movies that played out during the series' run. It often poked fun at itself or its low-budget film origins.

== Plot ==
The series picks up five years after The Great Tomato War (much as the film Return of the Killer Tomatoes did), where tomatoes are banned. However that has not stopped Dr. Putrid T. Gangreen from engaging in his experiments. Gangreen's ultimate goal is world domination and he will not let anyone stop him. But his most successful experiment may very well be his undoing. Tara Boumdeay, a tomato turned human, runs away from Gangreen, taking along her "Brother", the fur-covered F.T., whom she passes off as a dog. They befriend Chad Finletter (nephew of the Great Tomato War veteran, Wilbur Finletter) who, after saving the pair from a tomato attack, gets Tara a job at his uncle Wilbur's Tomatoless Pizza Parlor. She shares their secret with Chad regarding the two of them being tomatoes and Chad vows to help them against whatever Gangreen has planned. That is where everyone stands at the start of the first episode, "Give A Little Whistle", where the evil Doctor sets his new plans into motion (and would continue through the first season).

Season Two would center on Gangreen actually conquering the world in the debut episode. However, he is overthrown by Zoltan and his gang of twice-mutated tomatoes and is forced to join up with Chad, Tara, Wilbur and the rest of the Killer Tomato Task Force (other vets of the Great Tomato War).

== Characters ==
=== Main characters ===
- Chad Finletter (voiced by Christian Guzek) – Chad is a bright ten-year-old boy living with his Uncle Wilbur, working as a pizza delivery boy for Wilbur's Pizza Palace. Chad is one of the few people to know the truth about Tara and F.T. really being tomatoes, but as an act of friendship promised to keep their secret. Chad is the real guiding force behind stopping Gangreen, but because he is a kid, nobody takes him seriously. By the end of the first season, Gangreen puts a bounty on Chad to stop his constant interference. During the second season, Chad becomes a leader, convincing the others to free Gangreen to help their cause.
- Tara Boumdeay (voiced by Kath Soucie) – Tara is one of Dr. Gangreen's failed experiments, a tomato who took on a teenage humanoid form. She abandoned his evil plans with F.T. and escaped to the Finletter's where she is Chad's best friend and waitress at Wilbur's Pizza Palace. Tara reverts to tomato form when exposed to salt, which can be cured with pepper. She is also shown to have telepathic and telekinetic powers.
- Wilbur Finletter (voiced by Thom Bray) – A Great Tomato War veteran, leader of the Killer Tomato Taskforce, and owner of Wilbur's Pizza Palace. He is frequently trying new recipes for tomato-less pizzas, most of the time failing. Wilbur is still slightly delusional from the war and believes that tomatoes are only good squashed. During the second season, Wilbur becomes a rebel leader when the killer tomatoes conquer Earth.
- F.T. (vocal effects provided by S. Scott Bullock) – Short for Fuzzy Tomato, F.T. is a failed experiment who turned out cute, fuzzy, and incapable of evil. He would have been destroyed by Gangreen, but was rescued by Tara, who disguises him as an ugly dog.
- Whitley White (voiced by Neil Ross) – A news reporter for the San Zucchini news station.

=== Recurring characters ===
- The Killer Tomato Taskforce - (KTTF for short) is a task force that opposes the Killer Tomatoes.
  - Sam "The Sham" Smith (voiced by S. Scott Bullock) – A member of the Killer Tomato Taskforce. Sam is a master of disguise, but yet his most recognizable outfit is that of the Lone Ranger.
  - Floyd Bridgework (voiced by Thom Bray) – A member of the Killer Tomato Taskforce. Floyd is an underwater expert and is never seen without his scuba gear on, even when trying on a disguise or something like skating.
  - Mary Jo Nagamininashy (voiced by Kath Soucie) – A member of the Killer Tomato Taskforce. Mary Jo is the only female on the team besides Tara. She is a German athlete that is always into exercise, even when battling tomatoes.
- Tomato Guy (voiced by Maurice LaMarche) – A character who appeared in every episode of the show. He would shout "Tomato" only to cause anybody in the area to panic, and additionally appears as a speaking extra in various episodes. It was later revealed in the Season Two episode "Stemming The Tide" that he makes fun of tomatoes because as a kid, he was served cold tomato soup at a family get-together. The soup was alive and pestering Tomato Guy until he captured it by covering his soup bowl with a saucer. The character's voice and design were modelled upon the "Man in Library" character played by Costa Dillon in the original film.
- The Censor Lady (voiced by S. Scott Bullock) – An old woman who appears and tries to stop a character if they are doing some violence-related or imitable behavior. It was revealed in the episode 'Streets of Ketchup' that she is a being similar to Tara, turning into a prune when squirted with salt water.
- Mayor Leonard Earwax (voiced by Cam Clarke) – The mayor of San Zucchini. Earwax is an airhead who somehow lucked into his job.

=== Villains ===
- Dr. Putrid T. Gangreen (voiced by John Astin) – The main villain of the series who is loosely based on Professor Mortimer Gangreen from the film series. An "angry" scientist (as opposed to a "mad" one), Dr. Gangreen created the killer tomatoes with the goal of global domination. Along with his dull-witted assistant Igor Smith and army of tomatoes led by his head tomato Zoltan, he is always trying to destroy San Zucchini and conquer the world. During the second season, Gangreen succeeds in conquering Earth, only to be overthrown by Zoltan and imprisoned when it became apparent that conquering the world had an oddly calming effect on Gangreen. Gangreen is busted out of jail by the Killer Tomato Taskforce and works with them to defeat Zoltan and the killer tomatoes once and for all.
  - Igor Smith (voiced by Cam Clarke) – Igor Smith is an air-headed young man from Malibu who dreams of becoming a TV reporter. He is not really evil, but more of a man that fell into the wrong crowd. Still, he will do his master's bidding without question if it means that he will be rewarded for helping conquer the planet by being made a reporter.

==== Tomatoes ====
- Gang of Six - A group of six elite tomatoes.
  - Zoltan (voiced by Maurice LaMarche) – Dr. Gangreen's tomato commander and leader of the Gang of Six. At first, Zoltan was a failed experiment originating from when Igor accidentally had placed old movies into their programming stage instead of training videos, causing him and his gang to be lazy and to imitate old movie characters occasionally. During the second season, Zoltan and his gang undergo a transformation, becoming larger, smarter, and deadlier. Zoltan and his gang conquer Earth and are each issued a continent to rule, with Zoltan controlling North America. Soon after that, Zoltan realizes that he no longer needs Gangreen and overthrows him.
  - Tomacho (voiced by Cam Clarke) – One of Zoltan's Gang of Six. Tomacho rules over South America and is known as being very calm and chill but also dimwitted. Tomacho speaks like John Travolta and with a surfer accent.
  - Beefsteak (voiced by Chuck McCann) – One of Zoltan's Gang of Six. Beefsteak rules over Europe, and is known for his short temper. Beefsteak has bull horns on his head and wears a nose ring, which only helps his image of charging at enemies like a bull.
  - Fang (voiced by Susan Silo) – One of Zoltan's Gang of Six. Fang rules over Africa and is known for her snake-like personality. She has snake-like eyes, tongue, and fangs.
  - Ketchuck (voiced by Maurice LaMarche) – One of Zoltan's Gang of Six. Ketchunk rules over Asia and is known for being the biggest and fattest of the gang of six. Besides being large, Ketchunk is constantly drooling and always hungry for food.
  - Mummato (voiced by Rob Paulsen) – One of Zoltan's Gang of Six. Mummato rules over Australia and New Zealand, and is known for his silence (though he does speak on rare occasions; his voice sounds much like Marlon Brando). Mummato is wrapped in bandages like a mummy.
- Phantomato (voiced by Maurice LaMarche) – A deformed tomato who sought refuge in the sewers after the tomatoes seized control of Earth. He hid his face behind a mask just like the Phantom of the Opera. Phantomato saves Tara from Zoltan and Beefsteak and offers to help her find Gangreen. When the tomatoes locate the two, Phantomato saves Tara by holding off the tomato soldiers while they escaped.
- The Ultimato (voiced by John Astin) – The last tomato experiment made by Dr. Gangreen who has the cloned brain of Dr. Gangreen. He was originally made to help the task force by fighting off the tomatoes, but later turned on them when he wanted to seize control for himself.
- Link (voiced by Maurice LaMarche) – A deformed tomato that was believed to be the missing link between fruit and vegetable. First appearing in the episode "Tomato From The Black Lagoon", it is revealed that Link is not quite like his killer cousins. He aids Chad and Tara against Gangreen and Igor.
- Johnny Tomato (voiced by Maurice LaMarche) – Inspired by his love of 1950s rockabilly music and a desire to erase the mistakes he made when he created Tara, Dr. Gangreen created a tomato that could change into a human named Johnny Tomato, and be used to lure the KTTF to their doom. Johnny's conflicted emotions between loyalty to Gangreen and his feelings towards Tara led to Johnny succumbing to the same allergy to salt that plagued Tara. Johnny is swept away by Gangreen's army of Killer Tomatoes. Though the character never appeared again, it was revealed in the season 2 episode "The Phantomato of the Opera" that Johnny survived.

== Episodes ==
=== Series overview ===
Series	Episodes	Originally released	
Series	Episodes	First released	Last released
1	13	8 September 1990	29 December 1990
2	8	7 September 1991	23 November 1991

=== Season 1 (1990) ===
No. overall	No. in season	Title	Written by	Original release date
1	1	"Give a Little Whistle"	Richard Mueller	8 September 1990
Dr. Putrid T. Gangreen has a whistle to command all tomatoes to destroy San Zucchini. Can Chad stop his plan and save Tara at the same time?
2	2	"Attack of the Killer... Pimentoes?"	Jack Enyart	15 September 1990
Dr. Gangreen utilizes cherry tomatoes in his latest conquest attempt. He sends Igor Smith to Finletter's Tomatoless Pizza Parlor and sells Wilbur on the idea that pimentos (actually the cherry tomatoes) could be used to showcase his latest pizza creation. They are sent to every neighborhood in this town. Now, San Zucchini is a battleground.
3	3	"Tomato from the Black Lagoon"	Ted Pedersen	22 September 1990
Dr Putrid T. Gangreen watched a news report with Whitley White about the Tomato Link from the Black Lagoon. Gangreen and Igor must bring it to the lab for examination. Meanwhile, Wilbur is about to give money to Chad. He's heading to the botanical gardens with FT and Tara. They're on the way to the Black Lagoon but they did not know is that the Tomato Link is under the depths. He caught Tara. Some say it was dangerous like the face of a tomato but inside his heart, he has love.
4	4	"Streets of Ketchup"	Richard Mueller	29 September 1990
Dr. Gangrene has built a new tomato. An Elvis-like person who is Tara's new idol.
5	5	"Tomato Invasion from Mars"	Ted Pedersen	13 October 1990
Tomatoes grown on Mars have mutated greatly and arrive on Earth for conquest. Can Chad, Tara and the Tomato Task Force combat a menace from beyond the stars?
6	6	"War of the Wierds"	Jack Enyart	20 October 1990
Igor Smith heads back to the lab from the henchman convention and finds the angry Dr. Gangreen a shell of himself. Dr. Gangreen relates the story of a childhood enemy named Sidney Igotcha whose tricks led to Gangreen's obsession with tomatoes. Now he's back and created a new enemy aimed at his own attempts at world conquest. It's an all-out war between the two bitter foes. Tomato vs. Kumquat and the Tomato Task Force caught in the middle.
7	7	"Invasion of the Tomato Snatchers"	Richard Mueller	27 October 1990
Dr. Gangreen's latest plot involves replacing every citizen in San Zucchini with tomato-headed doubles and it's up to Chad, FT & Tomato Guy to save the citizens, Tara and the day.
8	8	"Terminator Tomato from Tomorrow"	Ted Pedersen	10 November 1990
Chad & Tara must rescue the Tomato Task Force from the Tomato Terminator in the 23rd Century with the help of an eclectic star ship crew.
9	9	"Camp Casserole"	Richard Mueller	17 November 1990
Chad & Tara head to summer camp for two weeks where she is picked on by two mean girls. Dr. Gangreen plans to exploit Tara's hurt feelings by promising to make her fully human if she helps him control Larry, the largest tomato monster the angry Doctor ever created.
10	10	"Spatula, Prinze of Dorkness"	Richard Mueller	24 November 1990
On Halloween night, Count Dracula relates a tale of how he once gave Dr. Gangreen a serum to transform tomatoes into vampire tomatoes. Though the Doctor refused, Zoltan overheard their conversation and, mistaking the word serum for syrup, ingests the serum himself and renaming himself "Spatula, Prinze of Dorkness". Can they be stopped before the entire town is transformed into neck-kissing vampires?
11	11	"Frankenstem Tomato"	Ted Pedersen	1 December 1990
Wilbur's pizza delivery truck falls off a cliff in Death Valley as he was taking Tara, Chad and FT to the top secret Tomato Task Force field training. The only place stay for the night is the Frankenstem's Horror Castle where Doctor Gangreen plans on using Tara's tomato brain to bring the Frankenstem Monster to life.
12	12	"The Gang That Couldn't Squirt Straight"	Jack Enyart	15 December 1990
After a plot to splatter Chad with tomatoes goes awry, Zoltan & the Gang of Five rebel against Dr. Gangreen and take up racketeering to enslave some of San Zucchini's businesses. Luckily the mayor deputizes Wilbur, Chad & Tara to oppose this new threat.
13	13	"Beach Blanket Tomato"	Ted Pedersen	29 December 1990
The first-ever Tomato Task Force beach party is besieged by Dr. Gangreen's tomato sharks and it's up to Chad, Tara & the Tomato Task Force to stop him and get the show renewed for a second season.

=== Season 2 (1991) ===
No. overall	No. in season	Title	Written by	Original release date
14	1	"The Ripening Disaster"	Flint Dille	7 September 1991
Dr. Gangreen's latest scheme involves mutating Zoltan and his new Gang of Six into credible threats to conquer Earth one continent at a time.
15	2	"A Rotten Reversal"	Flint Dille	14 September 1991
After succeeding in his goal to conquer the world, Dr. Gangreen attains inner peace and releases the Tomato Task Force from his dungeon, which leads to his own creations turning on him. Meanwhile, the KTTF join up with Whitley White and Tomato Guy in the sewers attempting to avoid being recaptured by Zoltan's forces.
16	3	"Phantomato of the Opera"	Richard Mueller	21 September 1991
Dr. Gangreen is missing and the KTTF splits up to find him. Tara travels to Paris, France to locate him but only manages to locate the Phantomato of the Opera. Is he friend or foe? Note: This episode aired earlier than intended as it relates events viewers had yet to see, such as the new alliance between the KTTF & Gangreen & Igor in the episodes "A Rotten Reversal" & "The Tomato Worms Turn".
17	4	"Stemming the Tide"	Gordon Kent	5 October 1991
Will the Killer Tomato Task Force join Gangreen & Igor in an uneasy alliance to combat their mutual enemies? And is the key to defeating the tomatoes located in the heart of Africa, where they can't seem to get a clear foothold upon? Note: This episode aired later than was intended as it directly relates the events & fallout of "A Rotten Reversal".
18	5	"The Tomato Worms Turn"	Ted Pedersen	19 October 1991
Travelling to Africa via rollercoaster, Chad, Tara, Dr. Gangreen & Igor locate the one enemy that can defeat the tomatoes, the African Tomato Worm Tribe. Can they arrive back in San Zucchini to save the KTTF in what may be their last stand? Note: This episode also aired later than was intended as it directly relates the events & fallout of "A Rotten Reversal".
19	6	"Ultra-tomato III"	Unknown	2 November 1991
After the events of "The Tomato Worms Turn", Gangreen begins his new plot to take over the world with a new creation named the Ultimato, armed with a brain cloned from the angry Doctor himself. He & it deceive the KTTF into thinking it's on their side but the creature has its own designs on world domination and Gangreen doesn't fit into its plans.
20	7	"Tomatotransformation"	Evelyn Gabai	9 November 1991
The KTTF & Gang of Six trade places which leads to the newly-tomatoed Wilbur & his team being on the run while the now-human Gang of Six plan on putting the African Tomato Worms on ice. Can Chad, Tara, Gangreen & Igor reverse fortunes in time?
21	8	"The Great Tomato Wars"	Ted Pedersen	23 November 1991
With humanity slowly reclaiming Earth from the Killer Tomatoes, Fang stages an uprising and ousts Zoltan from the Gang of Six. Zoltan then forms a tentative alliance once more with Dr. Gangreen, who creates five new caveman-themed tomatoes to fight against Fang's crew. The tomato infighting threatens to undo the work achieved in previous episodes but the key to saving the day may very well be FT.

== Crew ==
- Stu Rosen - Voice Director

== Documentary ==
Screaming Soup! Presents the Attack of the Killer Tomatoes Retrospective, a documentary film focusing on the history of the Attack of the Killer Tomatoes franchise with interviews including cast and crew from Attack of the Killer Tomatoes TV Series, was released in February 2023 on YouTube.
