= Attack of the Killer Tomatoes =

1978 film by John DeBello

- Theatrical release poster
- Directed by: John DeBello
- Written by: John DeBello; Costa Dillon; Stephen Peace
- Story by: Costa Dillon
- Produced by: John DeBello; Stephen Peace
- Starring: David Miller; George Wilson; Costa Dillon; Sharon Taylor; Jack Riley
- Cinematography: John K. Culley
- Edited by: John DeBello
- Music by: Gordon Goodwin; Paul Sundfor; John DeBello
- Production company: Four Square Productions
- Distributed by: NAI Entertainment
- Release date: October 8, 1978
- Running time: 83 minutes
- Country: United States
- Language: English
- Budget: $100,420
- Box office: $2-5 million

Attack of the Killer Tomatoes is a 1978 American independent parody film produced by J. Stephen Peace and John DeBello, and directed by John DeBello based upon an original idea by Costa Dillon. The film stars David Miller, George Wilson, Sharon Taylor and Jack Riley.

The screenplay was written by Dillon, Peace and DeBello. The film spoofs B movies, and was made on a budget of less than $100,000. The story involves tomatoes becoming sentient by unknown means, and revolting against humanity.

Critical reception of Attack of the Killer Tomatoes was widely negative. The box office success of the film led to three sequels, all co-written by the same three writers and directed by DeBello.

== Plot ==
The film opens with a scroll stating that when Alfred Hitchcock's film The Birds (1963) was released, audiences laughed at the notion of birds revolting against humanity. However, when an attack perpetrated by birds occurred in 1975, no one laughed. This is followed by a pre-credits sequence of a tomato rising out of a woman's garbage disposal. Her puzzlement turns into terror as the tomato draws her into a corner. Following the opening credits, the police investigate her death. One officer discovers that the red substance covering her is not blood but tomato juice.

A series of attacks perpetrated by tomatoes occurs, including a man dying by drinking tomato juice made from a killer tomato, a boy heard being gobbled up by a killer tomato, and a sequence where the tomatoes attack innocent swimmers in a parody of Jaws. While the President's press secretary, Jim Richardson, tries to convince the public that no credible threat exists, the President puts together a team of specialists to stop the tomatoes, led by a man named Mason Dixon. Dixon's team includes Sam Smith, a disguise expert (whose unconventional disguises include George Washington, Abraham Lincoln, and Adolf Hitler); scuba diver Greg Colburn; Olympic swimmer Gretta Attenbaum; and parachute-toting soldier Wilbur Finletter.

Smith is sent out to infiltrate the tomatoes at a campfire, eventually blowing his cover while eating a hotdog and asking if anyone could "pass the ketchup". Colburn and Gretta are sent to sectors, while Finletter stays with Mason. Meanwhile, the President sends Richardson to the fictitious ad agency Mind Makers, where executive Ted Swan spends vast amounts of money to develop virtually worthless ploys, including a bumper sticker with "STP" for "Stop Tomato Program" on it, a satirical reference to both the real "whip inflation now" campaign with its widely ridiculed "WIN" slogan and STP motor oil decals and bumper stickers, which were commonplace in the 1970s.

A human is revealed to be also plotting to stop Dixon when a masked assassin attempts to shoot him but misses. A senate subcommittee meeting is held where one secret pamphlet is leaked to a newspaper editor, who sends society writer Lois Fairchild on the story. While she tails Finletter, he mistakes her for a spy and trashes a hotel room attempting to kill her. He then chases the assassin as the masked man fails again to kill Dixon but loses him.

Gretta is killed, and further regression has led leaders to bring in tanks and soldiers to the West Coast in a battle that leaves the American forces in shambles. Dixon, walking among the rubble, sees a trail of tomato juice and decides to investigate. He ends up being chased by a killer tomato to an apartment where an oblivious child is listening to the radio. The tomato is about to kill Dixon but suddenly flies out the window. Dixon peers out to see if it has died, and he spots the assassin hijacking his car. He chases the assassin in a "slow car chase" but finds himself knocked out by his own car. Awakening, Dixon finds himself captured by Richardson. Though he did not create the killer tomatoes, he has discovered how to control them and plans to do so once civilization has collapsed – leaving him in control. He is about to reveal his secret of control to Dixon when Finletter charges in and runs him through with his sword.

Dixon, picking up some strewn records, realizes that he has seen the tomatoes retreat at the sound of the song "Puberty Love" but had not put two and two together until now. He orders Finletter to gather all the remaining people and bring them to the stadium. Finletter remarks that "only crazy people" are left in the nearly deserted city, resulting in a motley assortment of people in costumes facing the attacking tomatoes at the stadium.

The tomatoes are cornered in a stadium. "Puberty Love" is played over the loudspeaker, causing the tomatoes to shrink and allowing the various people at the stadium to stomp on them repeatedly. Fairchild, meanwhile, is cornered by a giant tomato wearing earmuffs, hence cannot hear the music. Dixon saves her by showing the tomato the sheet music to "Puberty Love". He professes his love to her, in song. The film ends with a carrot that rises from the soil and says, "All right, you guys. They're gone now."

== Cast ==
- David Miller as Mason Dixon
- George Wilson as Jim Richardson
- Sharon Taylor as Lois Fairchild
- Stephen Peace as Wilbur Finletter
- Ernie Meyers as the President
- Eric Christmas as Senator Polk
- Ron Shapiro as Newspaper editor
- Al Sklar as Ted Swan
- Jerry Anderson as Major Mills
- Jack Riley as Von Schauer
- Gary Smith as Sam Smith
- John Qualls as Captain
- Geoff Ramsey as the Stapler
- Ryan Shields as Tomato
- Benita Barton as Gretta Attenbaum
- Don Birch as the Old Man
- Tom Coleman as the Singing Soldier
- Art K. Koustik as the FIA Director
- Jack Nolen as Senator McKinley
- Paul Oya as Dr. Nokitofa
- Robert Judd as the Stuntman
- Byron Teegarden as Dr. Morrison
- Michael Seewald as Cameraman
- Steve Cates as Greg Colburn, the diver
- Dean Grell as Miss Potato Famine 1922

The film also contains the first screen appearance of Dana Ashbrook, then aged 10 or 11, as Boy on Boat (uncredited).

== Production ==
"We were hit by a kamikaze tomato!" "Tomatoes can't fly!" "Yeah? Well, they can't eat people, either, but they're doing one hell of a job of that!"

— Dialogue from a scene that was worked into the film after the helicopter crash

Filming took place in Oceanside and other parts of San Diego County, including Balboa Park and University of California, San Diego. The finished film contains footage of a real helicopter crash. In a scene showing law enforcement officers firing their weapons to ward off tomatoes in a field, a $60,000 Hiller Aircraft UH-12E that had been rented for the production was supposed to land in the tomato patch behind the officers. But during the landing the Hiller's tail rotor struck the ground, causing the craft to spin out of control near the ground, roll over, and burst into flames. The helicopter pilot escaped without serious injury. The crash was caught on film, as the cameras were rolling at the time, and later worked into the final product with added dialogue about a "kamikaze tomato" hitting the helicopter.

== Music ==
The theme song, written by DeBello, describes the tomatoes' rampages through the world, describing that they have killed a man named Herman Farbage while he was taking out the garbage, that the mayor is on vacation to get out of stopping them, that they have scared off the National Guard, and that they have even eaten the narrator's sister. This theme song is used in different variations over the course of the series, here simply sounding like the score of an old monster movie with lyrics and a more catchy tune. All other music was written by Gordon Goodwin and Paul Sundfor with lyrics by Dillon, DeBello, and Peace.

The song "Puberty Love" was sung by the then-teenaged Matt Cameron, who later became the drummer for Soundgarden and between 1998 and 2025 was the drummer for Pearl Jam.

== Critical reception ==
Upon release, Variety wrote that the film "isn't even worthy of sarcasm". Emanuel Levy gave the film a score of 2 out of 5. Time Out called the film a "one-joke spoof". Eric Henderson, reviewing the DVD edition for Slant Magazine in 2003 opined that "even more so than the Samuel Arkoff-like opportunism of the producers, and more so than some of the worst framing this side of Coleman Francis, the really frustrating thing about Tomatoes is the toothlessness of its satire. And that's a major missed opportunity, considering that the irony of using a stereotypically foreign genre (Japanese monster movies) against a parody of America's jingoistic reliance on military power (the Army is useless against the giant tomatoes) should've been a comedic gold mine." Rue Morgue writer Michael Gingold later wrote, in a review of the Blu-ray edition in 2018, that "Attack of the Killer Tomatoes may be one of history's most misunderstood films. It has often been celebrated as a prime example of 'so bad it's funny' cinema, when in fact it's an attempt at intentional comedy that is, at best, a scattershot success."

The review aggregator Rotten Tomatoes reported that 27% of critics have given the film a positive review based on 11 reviews, with an average rating of 4.30/10. On Metacritic, the film has a weighted average score of 9 out of 100 based on 5 critic reviews, indicating "overwhelming dislike".

== Legacy ==
Attack of the Killer Tomatoes has become a cult film. It is listed at #1 on Times of San Diego's off-the-wall movies filmed in San Diego. A number of sequels and other spin-off material have been done in various media as a result of this movie. They include three movie sequels:

- Return of the Killer Tomatoes! (1988)
- Killer Tomatoes Strike Back! (1991)
- Killer Tomatoes Eat France! (1992)

The sequel Return of the Killer Tomatoes picks up the story 10 years later. The film is notable for the casting of George Clooney in one of his first film roles.

American composer and orchestrator Gordon Goodwin, one of the original composers for the film, later wrote an Emmy-nominated, big-band piece inspired by the music for this film, to be played with his jazz ensemble Gordon Goodwin's Big Phat Band.

=== Reboot ===
In 2025, Deadline Hollywood announced production was underway for Attack of the Killer Tomatoes: Organic Intelligence. The cast includes David Koechner, John Astin, Dan Bakkedahl, Daniel Roebuck, Catherine Corcoran, Paul Bates, Vernee Watson, Eric Roberts, Myrna Velasco, Noor Razooky, Samantha Bailey, and Joshua Poon. Filmmaker David Ferino was signed on to direct with Costa Dillon and J. Stephen Peace as executive producers. Filming took place in several counties throughout Southern California.

=== Adaptations, parodies, and spin-offs ===
- The film was adapted in 1990 as Attack of the Killer Tomatoes, a cartoon TV series which ran on Fox Kids, but despite the name, it was based on Return of the Killer Tomatoes.
- A novel released in 1997, Attack of the Killer Potatoes, pays tribute to the film.
- Different video games were developed: a 1986 video game released for 8-bit computers, which was based on the film, and a 1991 video game released for the Nintendo Entertainment System and Game Boy game consoles, which was based on the animated series.
- Viper Comics released a comic book adaptation of the film in October 2008.
- Kim Harrison's book series The Hollows is based in a world where genetically engineered tomatoes killed off a significant portion of the human population. The author admitted inspiration came from this movie.
- A Greek film has also been made as an homage, I epithesi tou gigantiaiou mousaka (The Attack of the Giant Moussaka) (1999).
- IDW Publishing comic series of My Little Pony: Friendship is Magic parodies the movie but with apples.
- The conference room scene in the film is parodied in the opening title sequence for the 2022 anime series Chainsaw Man.
- Jeff Strand's novelization of the film was published in April 2023.

=== Cancelled remake ===
In 2008, a remake was announced. Kent Nichols and Douglas Sarine, creators of Ask a Ninja, were developing the project. This was to be Nichols' directorial debut. M. Dal Walton III was co-producing along with Emmett/Furla Films. In 2011, John DeBello said that the Ask a Ninja creators were no longer involved.

=== Documentary ===
Screaming Soup! Presents the Attack of the Killer Tomatoes Retrospective, a documentary film focusing on the history of the Attack of the Killer Tomatoes franchise with interviews including cast and crew from Attack of the Killer Tomatoes, was released in February 2023 on YouTube.

== See also ==
- List of media set in San Diego
- The Little Shop of Horrors
