= Who Wants to Marry a Multi-Millionaire? =

American reality television special

- Genre: Reality
- Created by: Mike Fleiss
- Written by: Jonathan Bourne
- Directed by: Don Weiner
- Presented by: Jay Thomas
- Narrated by: Mark Thompson
- Composers: John Carta; Danny Lux
- Country of origin: United States
- Original language: English

Production
- Executive producers: Mike Fleiss; Don Weiner
- Producer: Chris Briggs
- Production location: Las Vegas, Nevada
- Running time: 120 minutes

Original release
- Network: Fox
- Release: February 15, 2000

Who Wants to Marry a Multi-Millionaire? is an American reality television special in which 50 women competed in a beauty pageant–style contest to marry a wealthy man whom they had never met, with the wedding being performed at the end of the program. The show was aired by Fox as a single two-hour broadcast on February 15, 2000, and was hosted by Jay Thomas.

The show was controversial, with both the feminist National Organization for Women (NOW) and the conservative Media Research Center (MRC) condemning the program. Following the broadcast, it was alleged that the supposed multi-millionaire, Rick Rockwell, had embellished claims about his professional and financial success, and it was subsequently found that he had been the subject of a restraining order from a previous partner, which had not been discovered by Fox during a background check. Fox later admitted they felt it a nonissue as Rockwell honored the restraining order as it expired without issue. The contest's winner, Darva Conger, expressed regret for taking part in the program and her marriage to Rockwell was annulled.

In 2002, TV Guide ranked it number 25 on its "50 Worst TV Shows of All Time" list.

== Format ==
The special was structured as a beauty pageant-like competition in which 50 women (one from each U.S. state) competed to be the bride of an unknown multi-millionaire, whom they only saw in silhouette. The competition included a swimwear portion and a question-and-answer portion. The millionaire, ultimately revealed as Rick Rockwell, selected Contestant Number 13, Darva Conger of California, and married her on the spot. In addition to the television wedding, Conger also received a three-carat (600-mg) diamond ring and more than $100,000 in prizes. More than 22 million people viewed the show's broadcast.

The special's name was a parody of Who Wants to Be a Millionaire? the popular game show that was airing on competing network ABC at the time. Mike Darnell, then head of unscripted programming at Fox, said that he was both inspired by the success of Who Wants to Be a Millionaire? and a wedding he attended during the time; he identified "winning money" and "getting married" as two "huge American dreams", and sought to combine the two.

== Production ==
Who Wants to Marry a Multi-Millionaire? was conceived by Mike Darnell, the vice president of alternative programming at Fox, while attending the wedding of his wife's cousin in August 1999. Darnell claimed he was "bored out of my mind" and thought about combining the idea of a wedding with Who Wants to Be a Millionaire?

== Reception ==
Despite the program's high ratings, it was harshly condemned as exploitative and denounced by the National Organization for Women and the Media Research Center.

Shortly after the program aired, questions were also raised as to whether Rockwell was actually a multi-millionaire. Fox stated that Rockwell had $750,000 in liquid assets and a net worth of slightly more than $2 million. However, Rockwell's ordinary-looking home, which had a discarded toilet in the backyard, did not burnish his image. Several of his other claims were called into question. For instance, Rockwell claimed to have given up his career as a comedian in 1990 in order to become a motivational speaker. However, he'd performed at a comedy club as late as 1998, and several organizations where he claimed to have spoken said they'd never hired him. Then, on February 19, The Smoking Gun discovered that one of Rockwell's former girlfriends, Debbie Goyne, had filed a restraining order against him for domestic violence in 1991. Goyne claimed that Rockwell assaulted her and stalked her when she tried to break off their engagement. However, the restraining order eventually expired as there were no reports of Rockwell attempting to violate it. It was later discovered that Rockwell was not his original last name; he was born Richard Balkey in Pittsburgh on October 26, 1957. There are several instances of the name "Rockwell" being overdubbed in the final program, indicating that he was referred to as Richard Balkey during most or all of the taping, with the other name inserted in post-production.

Conger quickly expressed regret for taking part in the show. After returning from their honeymoon in Barbados, she told Good Morning America, "I am not married to him. In my heart I'm not married to him." Conger said that the marriage was not consummated, and that they had stayed in separate cabins during their honeymoon. After the honeymoon, Conger sought an annulment and later sold the engagement ring and other prizes she won on the show on an online auction site. The annulment was finalized on April 5, 2000.

Due to the controversy, Fox canceled a scheduled repeat airing of the show and abandoned plans for future installments. Fox Entertainment chairman Sandy Grushow said that as lucrative as programs of this nature had been for the network, it could not reap any long-term benefit from them.

An internal probe by Fox found there was no negligence on the part of either the network or producer Next Entertainment. It determined that the private investigators hired by Next would not have found the restraining order because the Fair Credit Reporting Act bars consumer reporting agencies from reporting information going further than seven years except for criminal convictions.

== Aftermath ==
After the show aired, Conger made numerous public comments about how she was offended by Rockwell's kissing her on stage, that they never consummated their marriage, and how the entire episode went against her set of morals. Matt Lauer was publicly critical of Conger being asked to do multiple interviews on The Today Show, saying he did not want her on after the first interview, becoming incredulous at her claims she did not want to be well-known, and making sarcastic comments in the second interview, where he pointedly said, "you're not coming back, right?" and gave the notion that he would never talk to her again. Lauer and Today executive producer Jeffrey Zucker agreed she would never be asked back to The Today Show.

In February 2001, Conger and Rockwell appeared on Larry King Live and sparred over comments each of them had made about the other. Conger claimed that she should not have appeared on the program at all, and admitted that she had been overly harsh in her public statements about Rockwell.

In August 2000, Conger posed nude for Playboy magazine. She faced Olga Korbut on an episode of Celebrity Boxing which aired on May 22, 2002. Conger won by unanimous decision.

Conger married physician assistant Jim Arellano in 2003, with whom she had one son, Cassius. They divorced in 2009 and she and her son live in Northern California, where she works as a nurse anesthetist.

Rockwell toured the country on a comedy tour he called "The Annulment Tour", and appeared on an episode of The Norm Show. He later appeared as a presenter in several aviation computer-based training CD-ROM courses from King Schools.

In 2025 on the 25-year anniversary of the show's airing on Fox, Conger confirmed in interviews that she didn't take the show seriously, wasn't interested in Rockwell at all, and beyond enjoying the experience and payment when she posed for Playboy, was happy to have moved entirely past the situation to become a single mom. Efforts by reporters to get Rockwell to speak on the record or show where he now lives were unsuccessful, but their searches confirmed that he no longer works in comedy or any other facet of entertainment, and is no longer a public figure.

== See also ==
- The Proposal (TV series)
- Joe Millionaire
- The Bachelor (American TV series)
- Married at First Sight (American TV series)
- List of television shows notable for negative reception
