= Return of the Killer Tomatoes =

1988 film by John De Bello

Return of the Killer Tomatoes!
- Theatrical release poster
- Directed by: John De Bello
- Written by: John De Bello; Costa Dillon; Stephen Peace
- Produced by: Stephen Peace
- Starring: Anthony Starke; George Clooney; Karen Mistal; Steve Lundquist; John Astin
- Cinematography: Stephen Kent Welch
- Edited by: John De Bello
- Music by: Neal Fox; Rick Patterson
- Production company: Four Square Productions
- Distributed by: New World Pictures
- Release date: April 22, 1988
- Running time: 98 minutes
- Country: United States
- Language: English
- Budget: $1 million
- Box office: $5 million

Return of the Killer Tomatoes! is a 1988 American parody film directed by John De Bello. The first sequel to the 1978 film Attack of the Killer Tomatoes, the film stars Anthony Starke, Karen Mistal, and John Astin, as well as George Clooney in an early role. Like its predecessor, Return of the Killer Tomatoes was largely panned by critics. It has been described as a cult film.

== Plot ==
Ten years after the events of Attack of the Killer Tomatoes (referred to as the "Great Tomato War"), tomatoes have been outlawed, although authorities still deal with "tomato smugglers". Wilbur Finletter has been praised as a hero of the Great Tomato War and parlayed his fame into opening Finletter's Pizzeria, which serves tomato-less pizzas. Working for Wilbur is his nephew Chad Finletter. Chad is roommates with Matt Stevens, a suave ladies' man.

Professor Mortimer Gangreen, the mad scientist responsible for the Tomato War, and his assistant Igor seek to unleash another wave of tomato terror. Gangreen was perplexed at being defeated by "Puberty Love", the worst song ever created, and says that this time music will aid, rather than hinder him. By dipping ordinary tomatoes into vats of toxic waste and placing them into a transformation chamber, Gangreen uses a juke box hooked up to the chamber to create virtually anything based on the song he has picked; Michael Jackson music seems to make tomatoes into a clone of Jackson, the Miami Vice theme makes replicas of Don Johnson, and seductive music turns tomatoes into beautiful women. Gangreen's preferred music is rock, which creates soldiers. With his tomato commandos, Gangreen seeks to break out his imprisoned ally Jim Richardson and install him as President of the United States. Gangreen has also used his device to create an attractive female replica named Tara, who serves Gangreen until she realizes his abusive attitude towards a mutated tomato whom she dubs FT, or Fuzzy Tomato. Tara defects to Finletter's Pizza where she starts dating Chad.

The plot breaks the fourth wall as the characters relate to the audience that the production has run out of money. Matt suggests product placement as a solution. The characters showcase and promote various products as the plot continues.

Tara protects FT while living with Chad and Matt. As Igor searches for Tara, Chad notices his garbage truck and follows it to Dr. Gangreen's house; Chad watches as they transform a tomato into a person. Arriving home, Chad finds Tara consuming plant food—they both scream and she runs away, only to be kidnapped by Igor and returned to Dr. Gangreen. Chad grabs a tomato from a smuggler, believing it to be Tara. He and Matt use Dr. Gangreen's equipment on it. They find the machine can create a wide range of people depending on the music used, including more beautiful women (of great interest to Matt) but they do not get Tara back. They are captured by Dr. Gangreen, who squishes the tomato and has Igor throw them into the dungeon.

There they find Tara unharmed, and she and Chad reconcile. Outside the locked door they hear FT, to whom they pass a message to deliver to Wilbur, who gathers a team of heroes from the first film to rescue the captives. Dr. Gangreen forces Chad and Matt into the transformation chamber and starts a countdown that at the end will transform them into tomatoes. He and Igor leave with a captive Tara to raid the prison and start Dr. Gangreen's plan for world domination; Wilbur and his team rescue Chad and Matt.

At the prison, Dr. Gangreen transforms a bag of tomatoes into a well-armed assault team. While fighting, Gangreen and Igor imprison Tara in a gas chamber and threaten to gas her if the pursuers do not surrender; Igor has a hand grenade. FT throws himself on the live hand grenade before it explodes and Gangreen triggers the gas. As the fumes envelop Tara behind the door she and Chad have a tearful farewell. Matt presses a button to clear the gas from the chamber.

Chad opens the door to find an unharmed Tara. Gangreen plays music to transform Tara back into a tomato but nothing happens; exposure to the gas has made Tara permanently human. After Gangreen and Igor are taken into custody, the town celebrates, and FT is the guest of honor. Chad and Tara ride off into the sunset with the blessing of Wilbur, and Matt dismantles Dr. Gangreen's transformation machine. On a beach, Matt holds a tomato and is surrounded by several buxom bathing beauties.

A post-credits scene shows mutated carrot soldiers with rifles, having killed two humans.

== Cast ==
- Anthony Starke as Chad Finletter
- George Clooney as Matt Stevens
- Karen Mistal as Tara Boumdeay
- Steve Lundquist as Igor
- John Astin as Professor Mortimer Gangreen
- J. Stephen Peace as Wilbur Finletter
- Michael Villani as Bob Downs
- Frank Davis as Sam Smith
- Harvey Weber as Sid
- Charlie Jones as the Sportscaster
- John De Bello as Charles White
- Ian Hutton as Greg Colburn
- Teri Weigel as Matt's Playmate
- Rick Rockwell as Jim Richardson / Tomato Dealer

Future US congressman Gary Condit also had an uncredited and unspoken role in the film. Rick Rockwell, who played Jim Richardson, later would appear on the TV show Who Wants to Marry a Multi-Millionaire?.

== Production ==
=== Filming ===
Principal photography for the film occurred in the South Bay of San Diego County.

=== Poster ===
The art for the poster was created by illustrator David R. Darrow. The original design as assigned by designer Kevin Eaton and completed by Darrow, used the design of a Campbell's Soup can, using the face of actor John Astin in the center seal. The idea was sidelined over copyright / branding concerns, and a "patch" was created to alter the work. High-end digital compositing was too expensive at the time, so Darrow was further commissioned to create the new replacement label which was physically glued over the original illustration, preserving the original background and tomato characters. Darrow still retains the original, 2-layer artwork.

== Reception ==
According to IMDb it grossed $5 million in U.S. sales.

On Rotten Tomatoes, the film holds a score of 0% from 6 reviews. TV Guide described the film as being an "unnecessary sequel", and Emanuel Levy gave it a rating of 2 out of 5.

Retrospective reviews have been more favorable. JoBlo.com reviewer Jason Adams wrote, "The zany, self-referential style lends itself to an unending stream of gags, and overall more jokes work than don't." VultureHound's Lee Hazell wrote that "Return of the Killer Tomatoes has everything a comedy like this needs. An irreverent attitude towards filmmaking conventions, genre expectations and downright decency. The manic energy of the Marx Brothers. The wilfully gleeful stupidity of the Zucker films. The playfulness of Mel Brooks. The only thing they don’t have is action scenes with murderous tomatoes. For some reason, the plot dictates that they all get turned into Chippendales with machine guns. So that takes off a point." DVD Talk reviewer Adam Tyner wrote, "Its hyper-meta sense of humor was years (maybe approaching decades) before its time. Return of the Killer Tomatoes doesn't just break the fourth wall; it grinds it into a fine powder, mixes it with some hardwood mulch, and lets all manner of comedy and humor blossom from there".

Chris Coffel, writing for Bloody Disgusting, in review of the Blu-ray edition of the film, wrote, "Return of the Killer Tomatoes has so many great jokes and little tidbits that you can’t possibly catch them in one viewing. It’s similar to The Simpsons in not only the level of humor it provides but that it’s a movie made for the VHS generation." Anthony Arrigo, reviewing the same edition for Dread Central, called the film a "zany riot. [...] Think the output of Zucker/Abrams back in their heyday, add a dose of Mel Brooks’ humor, and that's the direction for this sequel to the equally absurd Attack of the Killer Tomatoes (1978). One liners and sight gags fly with such frequency that it's almost impossible to hear and see every joke the first time around. [...] few films have ever taken comedy this meta. The actors don't break the fourth wall; the film itself breaks it!"

== Documentary ==
Screaming Soup! Presents the Attack of the Killer Tomatoes Retrospective, a documentary film focusing on the history of the Attack of the Killer Tomatoes franchise with interviews including cast and crew from Return of the Killer Tomatoes, was released in February 2023 on YouTube.
