= Charles Harris Garrigues =

American writer and journalist

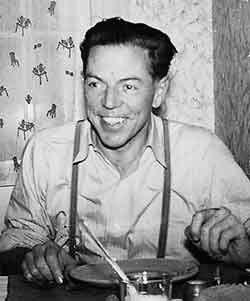
Garrigues circa 1941

Charles Harris Garrigues (July 7, 1902 – March 8, 1974) was an American writer and journalist. He was a general-assignment reporter in Los Angeles, California, in the 1920s, a grand jury investigator and political activist in the 1930s, a newspaper copy editor in the 1940s and a jazz critic in the 1950s. His nickname was Brick, for his red hair.

== Biography ==
=== Kansas and the Imperial Valley ===
The fourth child of Charles Louis and Emily Young Garrigues, Charles Harris was born on July 7, 1902, in Utica, Kansas. The family later moved to Imperial, California, near the Mexican border.

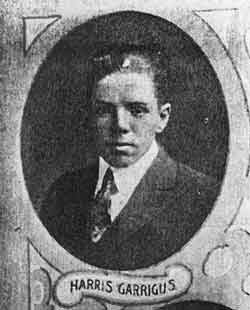
Garrigues's portrait at Imperial High School

While attending Imperial High School, the 15-year-old Garrigues wrote a letter to the local newspaper, the Imperial Enterprise, calling a previous letter-writer "ignorant" because of the views the latter had expressed in attacking a resigned Imperial High principal. As a result, the lad was expelled by the school board in May 1918. The expulsion resulted in what the Enterprise called a "Walkout of High School Students," who "paraded the streets to demonstrate their dissatisfaction at the refusal of the faculty to reinstate C. H. Garrigues of the senior class." It was said that all the students walked out, "with the exception of two girls." Garrigues was befriended by the editor of the newspaper, who taught him the craft of journalism, and in 1919 he was allowed to graduate.

=== Southern California ===
Garrigues attended the University of Southern California for a year but dropped out to become a reporter with the Hemet News in Riverside County. He then worked for the Venice Vanguard in Venice, a suburb of Los Angeles, and by mid-decade was with the Arizona Daily Star in Tucson. In 1926, he returned to Los Angeles, where he joined the Los Angeles Express as a copy editor. The next year he had become a reporter with the Los Angeles Illustrated Daily News, published by Manchester Boddy, where he specialized in reporting on civic affairs, particularly the county government.

In the early 1930s, Garrigues was not only covering civic news, but he had also volunteered to become the Daily News opera and classical-music critic. He had a regular political column called "The Spotlight." He also did investigative work into graft and corruption in county government, as a consequence of which by January 1931 he was granted a leave by Boddy to take a temporary job as an investigator for District Attorney Buron Fitts. His work led to the indictment and conviction of, and a prison term for, county supervisor Sidney T. Graves for accepting a bribe from builders of a flood-control dam on the San Gabriel River.

In 1934, he was working for a county grand jury impaneled by Superior Judge (and later Mayor) Fletcher Bowron; his investigation led to Fitts himself, whom the jury indicted that year on charges of bribery and perjury. In this work Garrigues became an enemy of Fitts, and the reporter was assaulted in a Hall of Justice stairway and beaten in a vacant courtroom by what he described as "a gang of the district attorney's plug-uglies."

By 1936, Garrigues was free-lancing as a political consultant, and the next year worked briefly for the San Diego Sun but soon left to become the editor of the Labor Leader, a newspaper published by the San Diego Federated Trades and Labor Council. In 1937 he was an organizer in Los Angeles for the American Newspaper Guild. He joined the Communist Party in 1937 but left it the next year.

=== San Francisco Bay Area ===
At the age of 34, Garrigues was named in 1936 as an investigator for a defense committee in the case of three labor union officials, Earl King, Ernest Ramsay, and Frank Conner, who faced trial for murdering an officer aboard a freighter anchored in the east San Francisco Bay, and three years later, in 1939, he moved to the Bay Area.

He found work as a copy editor on the San Francisco Examiner, where he stayed until his retirement in 1967. During that time, he wrote about the jazz scene in San Francisco. In 1943, his name was listed in a report of the anti-Communist Tenney Committee of the California state legislature in connection with testimony by writer Rena Vale about her experience as a Communist Party member from 1936 to 1938. In March 1953 Garrigues testified under subpoena in Los Angeles before Congressman Harold H. Velde of the House Committee on Un-American Activities about his interest in the labor movement and his membership in the Communist Party.

Between 1956 and 1961, Garrigues was the Examiner's staff jazz reviewer, "with a weekly column and a recognized name." He retired in 1967 and moved to the Los Angeles neighborhood of Brentwood in 1968. He died on March 8, 1974, in Pacific Palisades.

=== Marriages ===
Garrigues was married on April 30, 1926, to Beulah May Dickey. They had two sons and were divorced in 1937. He was married in 1938 to Naomi Silver, and they had one daughter. Naomi died in 1968. His third wife, whom he married in 1968, was Marguerite (Peggy) Walker.

== Published works ==
Besides numerous newspaper articles, music reviews, and phonograph album liner notes, Garrigues wrote:

- You're Paying for It!: A guide to graft, Funk and Wagnalls, August 1936
- So They Indicted Fitts (self-published pamphlet)
- Why Didn't Somebody Tell Somebody (self-published pamphlet), May 1938 and January 1939
- "Most Polite Man," Nation's Business magazine, February 1953 (article on San Francisco-Oakland Bay Bridge toll collectors)
- "Target Therapy: New hope for lost minds," Brief magazine, August 1953
- "How to Live Within Your Income," This Week magazine, February 18, 1959

== See also ==
- John Bell Clayton and Martha Clayton, friends
- Michael Foster, friend
- Lisa Roma, friend
- Toni Strassman, friend and literary agent
- List of newspaper columnists
