= Pickwick Hotel =

Pickwick Hotel may refer to:

- Pickwick Hotel (Anaheim, California), listed on the National Register of Historic Places
- Another hotel of The Pickwick Corporation
