= 2015 Arizona State Sun Devils football team =

American college football season

2015 Arizona State Sun Devils football

Cactus Bowl, L 42–43 vs. West Virginia
- Conference: Pac-12 Conference
- South Division
- Record: 6–7 (4–5 Pac-12)
- Head coach: Todd Graham (4th season)
- Offensive coordinator: Mike Norvell (4th season)
- Offensive scheme: Spread
- Defensive coordinator: Keith Patterson (2nd season)
- Co-defensive coordinator: Chris Ball (3rd season)
- Base defense: Hybrid Attacking
- Captains: Mike Bercovici; D.J. Foster; Jordan Simone
- Home stadium: Sun Devil Stadium

2015 Pac-12 Conference football standings
	Conf.			Overall
Team	W		L	W		L
North Division
No. 3 Stanford xy$	8	–	1	12	–	2
No. 19 Oregon	7	–	2	9	–	4
Washington State	6	–	3	9	–	4
California	4	–	5	8	–	5
Washington	4	–	5	7	–	6
Oregon State	0	–	9	2	–	10
South Division
USC xy	6	–	3	8	–	6
No. 17 Utah x	6	–	3	10	–	3
UCLA	5	–	4	8	–	5
Arizona State	4	–	5	6	–	7
Arizona	3	–	6	7	–	6
Colorado	1	–	8	4	–	9
Championship: Stanford 41, USC 22
$ – Conference champion; x – Division champion/co-champions; y – Championship game participant; Rankings from AP Poll

The 2015 Arizona State Sun Devils football team represented Arizona State University in the 2015 NCAA Division I FBS football season. They were led by fourth-year head coach Todd Graham and played their home games at Sun Devil Stadium. They were a member of the South Division of the Pac-12 Conference.

== Personnel ==
=== Coaching staff ===
Name	Position	Seasons at ASU	Alma mater
Todd Graham	Head coach	4	East Central (1987)
Mike Norvell	Offensive coordinator, Quarterbacks	4	Central Arkansas (2005)
Keith Patterson	Defensive coordinator	2	East Central (1986)
Shawn Slocum	Special teams coordinator	1	Texas A&M (1987)
Chris Ball	Co-defensive coordinator, defensive backs	4	Western State College (1985)
Chris Thomsen	Offensive line	3	TCU (1993)
Jackie Shipp	Defensive line	3	Oklahoma (1983)
Chip Long	Tight ends	4	North Alabama (2005)
DelVaughn Alexander	Wide receivers	4	USC (1995)
Josh Martin	Running backs	1	Tarleton State (2011)

== Offseason ==
=== Players drafted ===
Round	Pick	Player	Position	NFL team
1	30	Damarious Randall	Safety	Green Bay Packers
3	70	Jaelen Strong	Wide receiver	Houston Texans
4	114	Jamil Douglas	Offensive guard	Miami Dolphins
4	135	Marcus Hardison	Defensive end	Cincinnati Bengals

=== Class of 2015 signees ===
College recruiting
Name	Hometown	School	Height	Weight	Commit date
Jalen Bates; DE	Kaplan, LA	Kaplan High School	6 ft 5 in (1.96 m)	240 lb (110 kg)	Oct 7, 2014
Jalen Bates; DE	Recruit ratings: Scout: Rivals: 247Sports: ESPN:				
Cade Cote; OG	Gilbert, AZ	Williams Field High School	6 ft 3 in (1.91 m)	257 lb (117 kg)	Jun 23, 2014
Cade Cote; OG	Recruit ratings: Scout: Rivals: 247Sports: ESPN:				
Davon Durant; OLB	Greenwood, SC	Butler Community College	6 ft 2 in (1.88 m)	240 lb (110 kg)	Oct 21, 2014
Davon Durant; OLB	Recruit ratings: Scout: Rivals: 247Sports: ESPN:				
Raymond Epps; TE	Yuma, AZ	Arizona Western College	6 ft 5 in (1.96 m)	235 lb (107 kg)	Apr 5, 2014
Raymond Epps; TE	Recruit ratings: Scout: Rivals: 247Sports: ESPN:				
Morie Evans; ATH	Buford, GA	Buford High School	5 ft 11 in (1.80 m)	180 lb (82 kg)	Jan 16, 2014
Morie Evans; ATH	Recruit ratings: Scout: Rivals: 247Sports: ESPN:				
Dillon Faamatau; DT	Norwalk, CA	Norwalk High School	6 ft 4 in (1.93 m)	268 lb (122 kg)	Jan 26, 2015
Dillon Faamatau; DT	Recruit ratings: Scout: Rivals: 247Sports: ESPN:				
Tommy Hudson; TE	San Jose, CA	Archbishop Mitty High School	6 ft 5 in (1.96 m)	250 lb (110 kg)	Jul 1, 2014
Tommy Hudson; TE	Recruit ratings: Scout: Rivals: 247Sports: ESPN:				
Malik Lawal; OLB	Murrieta, CA	Chaparral High School	6 ft 0 in (1.83 m)	202 lb (92 kg)	Jun 18, 2014
Malik Lawal; OLB	Recruit ratings: Scout: Rivals: 247Sports: ESPN:				
George Lea; DT	New Orleans, LA	Landry-Walker High School	6 ft 2 in (1.88 m)	258 lb (117 kg)	Nov 12, 2014
George Lea; DT	Recruit ratings: Scout: Rivals: 247Sports: ESPN:				
Jaason Lewis; ATH	Virginia Beach, VA	Ocean Lakes High School	6 ft 4 in (1.93 m)	241 lb (109 kg)	Sep 25, 2014
Jaason Lewis; ATH	Recruit ratings: Scout: Rivals: 247Sports: ESPN:				
Steve Miller; OT	Gilbert, AZ	Gilbert High School	6 ft 4 in (1.93 m)	280 lb (130 kg)	Jun 23, 2014
Steve Miller; OT	Recruit ratings: Scout: Rivals: 247Sports: ESPN:				
Stanley Norman; CB	Gardena, CA	Junipero Serra High School	5 ft 11 in (1.80 m)	165 lb (75 kg)	Jan 3, 2015
Stanley Norman; CB	Recruit ratings: Scout: Rivals: 247Sports: ESPN:				
Kareem Orr; DB	Chattanooga, TN	Notre Dame School	5 ft 11 in (1.80 m)	185 lb (84 kg)	Feb 2, 2015
Kareem Orr; DB	Recruit ratings: Scout: Rivals: 247Sports: ESPN:				
Bryce Perkins; QB	Chandler, AZ	Chandler High School	6 ft 3 in (1.91 m)	201 lb (91 kg)	Apr 3, 2014
Bryce Perkins; QB	Recruit ratings: Scout: Rivals: 247Sports: ESPN:				
Nick Ralston; RB	Argyle, TX	Argyle High School	6 ft 0 in (1.83 m)	225 lb (102 kg)	Feb 1, 2014
Nick Ralston; RB	Recruit ratings: Scout: Rivals: 247Sports: ESPN:				
DeOnte Reynolds; DT	Pinole, CA	Contra Costa College	6 ft 4 in (1.93 m)	325 lb (147 kg)	Feb 4, 2015
DeOnte Reynolds; DT	Recruit ratings: Scout: Rivals: 247Sports: ESPN:				
Zach Robertson; OG	Bellflower, CA	St. John Bosco High School	6 ft 4 in (1.93 m)	313 lb (142 kg)	Dec 26, 2014
Zach Robertson; OG	Recruit ratings: Scout: Rivals: 247Sports: ESPN:				
Khaylan Thomas; OLB	Etiwanda, CA	Etiwanda High School	6 ft 1 in (1.85 m)	210 lb (95 kg)	Apr 3, 2014
Khaylan Thomas; OLB	Recruit ratings: Scout: Rivals: 247Sports: ESPN:				
Mason Walter; OT	Temecula, CA	Chaparral High School	6 ft 5 in (1.96 m)	275 lb (125 kg)	Jun 23, 2014
Mason Walter; OT	Recruit ratings: Scout: Rivals: 247Sports: ESPN:				
Brady White; QB	Newhall, CA	William S. Hart High School	6 ft 2 in (1.88 m)	186 lb (84 kg)	May 2, 2014
Brady White; QB	Recruit ratings: Scout: Rivals: 247Sports: ESPN:				
JoJo Wicker; DT	Long Beach, CA	Long Beach Polytechnic High School	6 ft 2 in (1.88 m)	260 lb (120 kg)	Feb 4, 2015
JoJo Wicker; DT	Recruit ratings: Scout: Rivals: 247Sports: ESPN:				
Jay Jay Wilson; ATH	Valencia, CA	Valencia High School	6 ft 3 in (1.91 m)	225 lb (102 kg)	Feb 2, 2015
Jay Jay Wilson; ATH	Recruit ratings: Scout: Rivals: 247Sports: ESPN:				
Overall recruit ranking: Scout: 19 Rivals: 20 247Sports: 20 ESPN: 26
Note: In many cases, Scout, Rivals, 247Sports, On3, and ESPN may conflict in their listings of height and weight.; In these cases, the average was taken. ESPN grades are on a 100-point scale.; Sources: "2015 Team Ranking". Rivals.com.

== Schedule ==
Date	Time	Opponent	Rank	Site	TV	Result	Attendance
September 5	4:00 pm	vs. Texas A&M*	No. 15	NRG Stadium; Houston, TX (Texas Kickoff)	ESPN	L 17–38	66,308
September 12	8:00 pm	No. 18 (FCS) Cal Poly*		Sun Devil Stadium; Tempe, AZ	P12N	W 35–21	46,500
September 18	7:00 pm	New Mexico*		Sun Devil Stadium; Tempe, AZ	P12N	W 34–10	43,310
September 26	7:30 pm	No. 19 USC		Sun Devil Stadium; Tempe, AZ	ESPN	L 14–42	61,904
October 3	4:30 pm	at No. 7 UCLA		Rose Bowl; Los Angeles, CA	FOX	W 38–23	80,113
October 10	7:00 pm	Colorado		Sun Devil Stadium; Tempe, AZ	P12N	W 48–23	44,157
October 17	7:00 pm	at No. 4 Utah		Rice-Eccles Stadium; Salt Lake City, UT	ESPN	L 18–34	46,192
October 29	7:30 pm	Oregon		Sun Devil Stadium; Tempe, AZ	ESPN	L 55–61 ^{3OT}	56,534
November 7	1:30 pm	at Washington State		Martin Stadium; Pullman, WA	FS1	L 24–38	32,952
November 14	1:00 pm	Washington^{†}		Sun Devil Stadium; Tempe, AZ	P12N	W 27–17	51,695
November 21	1:30 pm	Arizona		Sun Devil Stadium; Tempe, AZ (Territorial Cup)	FS1	W 52–37	64,885
November 28	8:00 pm	at California		California Memorial Stadium; Berkeley, CA	FS1	L 46–48	45,385
January 2	8:15 pm	vs. West Virginia*		Chase Field; Phoenix, AZ (Cactus Bowl)	ESPN	L 42–43	39,321
*Non-conference game; ^{†}Homecoming; Rankings from AP Poll released prior to the game; All times are in Mountain time

== Game summaries ==
=== vs Texas A&M (Texas Kickoff) ===
No. 15 Arizona State Sun Devils (0–0) vs Texas A&M Aggies (0–0) – Game summary

Quarter	1	2	3	4	Total
No. 15 Sun Devils	0	7	7	3	17
Aggies	7	7	3	21	38

at NRG Stadium • Houston, TX

- Date: September 5, 2015
- Game time: 4:00 p.m.
- Game weather: None (Indoor stadium)
- Game attendance: 66,308
- Referee: Reggie Smith
- TV announcers (ESPN): Brad Nessler (play-by-play), Todd Blackledge (analyst), Holly Rowe (sideline reporter)

Game information

First quarter

- (0:20) TAMU – Tra Carson 9-yard pass from Kyle Allen, Taylor Bertolet kick (Drive: 9 plays, 94 yards, 3:03; Texas A&M 7–0)

Second quarter

- (12:51) TAMU – Christian Kirk 79-yard punt return, Taylor Bertolet kick (Texas A&M 14–0)
- (9:56) ASU – Kody Kohl 4-yard pass from Mike Bercovici, Zane Gonzalez kick (Drive: 1 play, 4 yards, 0:04; Texas A&M 14–7)

Third quarter

- (5:19) TAMU – Taylor Bertolet 19-yard field goal (Drive: 4 plays, 2 yards, 1:25; Texas A&M 17–7)
- (2:37) ASU – Mike Bercovici 19-yard run, Zane Gonzalez kick (Drive: 8 plays, 75 yards, 2:42; Texas A&M 17–14)

Fourth quarter

- (8:32) TAMU – Kyle Allen 12-yard run, Taylor Bertolet kick (Drive: 9 plays, 84 yards, 2:54; Texas A&M 24–14)
- (4:16) ASU – Zane Gonzalez 23-yard field goal (Drive: 13 plays, 70 yards, 4:16; Texas A&M 24–17)
- (3:45) TAMU – Christian Kirk 66-yard pass from Kyle Allen, Taylor Bertolet kick (Drive: 2 plays, 75 yards, 0:31; Texas A&M 31–17)
- (1:38) TAMU – Tra Carson 10-yard run, Taylor Bertolet kick (Drive: 2 plays, 15 yards, 0:54; Texas A&M 38–17)

Statistics	ASU	TAMU
First downs	19	22
Total yards	291	425
Rushing yards	41–92	45–178
Passing yards	199	247
Passing: Comp–Att–Int	25–41–0	19–35–2
Time of possession	31:31	28:29

Team	Category	Player	Statistics
Arizona State	Passing	Mike Bercovici	25/41, 199 yards, TD
Arizona State	Rushing	Demario Richard	16 carries, 73 yards
Arizona State	Receiving	Ellis Jefferson	4 receptions, 69 yards
Texas A&M	Passing	Kyle Allen	15/26, 198 yards, 2 TD, INT
Texas A&M	Rushing	Tra Carson	29 carries, 96 yards, TD
Texas A&M	Receiving	Christian Kirk	6 receptions, 106 yards, TD

=== vs Cal Poly ===
Cal Poly Mustangs (1–0) vs Arizona State Sun Devils (0–1) – Game summary

Quarter	1	2	3	4	Total
Mustangs	0	14	7	0	21
Sun Devils	7	14	0	14	35

at Sun Devil Stadium • Tempe, AZ

- Date: September 12, 2015
- Game time: 8:00 p.m.
- Game weather: Mostly clear skies, 85 °F (29 °C)
- Game attendance: 46,500
- Referee: Chris Coyte
- TV announcers (Pac-12 Network): J.B. Long (play-by-play), Evan Moore (analyst), Drea Avant (sideline reporter)

Game information

First quarter

- (8:14) ASU – Elijah Marks 14-yard pass from Mike Bercovici, Zane Gonzalez kick (Drive: 9 plays, 77 yards, 3:01; Arizona State 7–0)

Second quarter

- (13:11) ASU – Demario Richard 13-yard run, Zane Gonzalez kick (Drive: 7 plays, 70 yards, 1:52; Arizona State 14–0)
- (10:32) CP – Joe Protheroe 4-yard run, Stephen Pyle kick (Drive: 8 plays, 64 yards, 2:32; Arizona State 14–7)
- (7:06) ASU – Manny Wilkins 6-yard run, Zane Gonzalez kick (Drive: 11 plays, 43 yards, 3:16; Arizona State 21–7)
- (0:09) CP – Chris Brown 1-yard run, Stephen Pyle kick (Drive: 10 plays, 46 yards, 2:22; Arizona State 21–14)

Third quarter

- (11:47) CP – Reagan Enger 21-yard pass from Chris Brown, Stephen Pyle kick (Drive: 8 plays, 75 yards, 3:13; Tied 21–21)

Fourth quarter

- (7:36) ASU – Kody Kohl 10-yard pass from Mike Bercovici, Zane Gonzalez kick (Drive: 5 plays, 46 yards, 1:27; Arizona State 28–21)
- (1:59) ASU – Tim White 4-yard pass from Mike Bercovici, Zane Gonzalez kick (Drive: 5 plays, 86 yards, 2:08; Arizona State 35–21)

Statistics	CP	ASU
First downs	20	28
Total yards	330	531
Rushing yards	71–284	45–248
Passing yards	46	283
Passing: Comp–Att–Int	4–8–0	23–35–1
Time of possession	32:22	27:38

Team	Category	Player	Statistics
Cal Poly	Passing	Chris Brown	4/8, 46 yards, TD
Cal Poly	Rushing	Joe Protheroe	28 carries, 130 yards, TD
Cal Poly	Receiving	Reagan Enger	1 reception, 21 yards, TD
Arizona State	Passing	Mike Bercovici	23/35, 283 yards, 3 TD, INT
Arizona State	Rushing	Demario Richard	25 carries, 121 yards, 2 TD
Arizona State	Receiving	Devin Lucien	7 receptions, 79 yards

=== vs New Mexico ===
New Mexico Lobos (1–1) vs Arizona State Sun Devils (1–1) – Game summary

Quarter	1	2	3	4	Total
Lobos	0	0	10	0	10
Sun Devils	0	10	14	10	34

at Sun Devil Stadium • Tempe, AZ

- Date: September 18, 2015
- Game time: 7:00 p.m.
- Game weather: Partly Cloudy, 96 °F (36 °C)
- Game attendance: 43,310
- Referee: Land Clark
- TV announcers (Pac-12 Network): Ted Robinson (play-by-play), Glenn Parker (analyst), Jill Savage (sideline reporter)

Game information

First quarter

- No scoring plays

Second quarter

- (11:26) ASU – Zane Gonzalez 22-yard field goal (Drive: 17 plays, 74 yards, 5:13; Arizona State 3–0)
- (0:37) ASU – Tim White 14-yard pass from Mike Bercovici, Zane Gonzalez kick (Drive: 8 plays, 80 yards, 1:59; Arizona State 10–0)

Third quarter

- (12:55) ASU – Demario Richard 33-yard pass from Mike Bercovici, Zane Gonzalez kick (Drive: 5 plays, 66 yards, 1:59; Arizona State 17–0)
- (11:15) UNM – Tyrone Owens 65-yard run, Jason Sanders kick (Drive: 4 plays, 75 yards, 1:40; Arizona State 17–7)
- (5:46) ASU – Mike Bercovici 8-yard run, Zane Gonzalez kick (Drive: 8 plays, 63 yards, 2:47; Arizona State 24–7)
- (1:44) UNM – Jason Sanders 32-yard field goal (Drive: 6 plays, 7 yards, 2:29; Arizona State 24–10)

Fourth quarter

- (13:26) ASU – Demario Richard 93-yard pass from Mike Bercovici, Zane Gonzalez kick (Drive: 3 plays, 93 yards, 0:28; Arizona State 31–10)
- (6:55) ASU – Zane Gonzalez 24-yard field goal (Drive: 8 plays, 44 yards, 2:54; Arizona State 34–10)

Statistics	UNM	ASU
First downs	15	19
Total yards	295	449
Rushing yards	47–184	30–132
Passing yards	111	317
Passing: Comp–Att–Int	12–29–1	22–37–0
Time of possession	36:21	23:39

Team	Category	Player	Statistics
New Mexico	Passing	Austin Apodoca	8/18, 89 yards, INT
New Mexico	Rushing	Tyrone Owens	4 carries, 72 yards, TD
New Mexico	Receiving	Dameon Gamblin	9 receptions, 148 yards, TD
Arizona State	Passing	Mike Bercovici	22/37, 317 yards, 3 TD
Arizona State	Rushing	Demario Richard	15 carries, 104 yards
Arizona State	Receiving	Demario Richard	4 receptions, 151 yards, 2 TD

=== vs No. 19 USC ===
No. 19 USC Trojans (2–1) vs Arizona State Sun Devils (2–1) – Game summary

Quarter	1	2	3	4	Total
No. 19 Trojans	7	28	0	7	42
Sun Devils	0	0	7	7	14

at Sun Devil Stadium • Tempe, AZ

- Date: September 26, 2015
- Game time: 7:30 p.m.
- Game weather: Mostly Clear, 97 °F (36 °C)
- Game attendance: 61,904
- Referee: Terry Leyden
- TV announcers (ESPN): Dave Pasch (play-by-play), Brian Griese (analyst), Tom Luginbill (sideline reporter)

Game information

First quarter

- (10:31) USC – Adoree Jackson 80-yard pass from Cody Kessler, Alex Wood kick (Drive: 3 plays, 77 yards, 1:17; USC 7–0)

Second quarter

- (11:22) USC – Steve Mitchell 27-yard pass from Cody Kessler, Alex Wood kick (Drive: 9 plays, 74 yards, 2:09; USC 14–0)
- (3:37) USC – JuJu Smith-Schuster 4-yard pass from Cody Kessler, Alex Wood kick (Drive: 6 plays, 66 yards, 2:34; USC 21–0)
- (0:25) USC – Chris Hawkins 94-yard fumble return, Alex Wood kick (USC 28–0)
- (0:03) USC – JuJu Smith-Schuster 10-yard pass from Cody Kessler, Alex Wood kick (Drive: 3 plays, 4 yards, 0:16; USC 35–0)

Third quarter

- (1:55) ASU – Demario Richard 1-yard run, Zane Gonzalez kick (Drive: 11 plays, 82 yards, 4:00; USC 35–7)

Fourth quarter

- (10:41) USC – Isaac Whitney 10-yard pass from Cody Kessler, Alex Wood kick (Drive: 6 plays, 65 yards, 2:44; USC 42–7)
- (7:45) ASU – Demario Richard 4-yard run, Zane Gonzalez kick (Drive: 9 plays, 74 yards, 2:47; USC 42–14)

Statistics	USC	ASU
First downs	18	26
Total yards	455	454
Rushing yards	32–76	35–182
Passing yards	478	290
Passing: Comp–Att–Int	20–34–1	23–44–1
Time of possession	27:38	32:22

Team	Category	Player	Statistics
USC	Passing	Cody Kessler	19/33, 375 yards, 5 TD, INT
USC	Rushing	Ronald Jones	10 carries, 54 yards
USC	Receiving	Adoree Jackson	3 receptions, 131 yards, TD
Arizona State	Passing	Mike Bercovici	23/44, 272 yards, INT
Arizona State	Rushing	Demario Richard	14 carries, 131 yards, 2 TD
Arizona State	Receiving	Gary Chambers	5 receptions, 103 yards

=== at No. 7 UCLA ===
Arizona State Sun Devils (2–2) at No. 7 UCLA Bruins (4–0) – Game summary

Quarter	1	2	3	4	Total
Sun Devils	9	6	14	9	38
No. 7 Bruins	0	10	0	13	23

at Rose Bowl • Pasadena, CA

- Date: October 3, 2015
- Game time: 4:30 p.m.
- Game weather: Light Haze, 79 °F (26 °C)
- Game attendance: 80,113
- Referee: Steve Strimling
- TV announcers (Fox): Gus Johnson (play-by-play), Joel Klatt (analyst), Molly McGrath (sideline reporter)

Game information

First quarter

- (2:14) ASU – Team safety (Arizona State 2–0)
- (1:21) ASU – Tim White 12-yard pass from Mike Bercovici, Zane Gonzalez kick (Drive: 3 plays, 31 yards, 0:38; Arizona State 9–0)

Second quarter

- (6:42) UCLA – Thomas Duarte 13-yard pass from Josh Rosen, Ka'imi Fairbairn kick (Drive: 8 plays, 88 yards, 2:27; Arizona State 9–7)
- (3:58) ASU – Zane Gonzalez 31-yard field goal (Drive: 8 plays, 40 yards, 2:34; Arizona State 12–7)
- (0:21) ASU – Zane Gonzalez 25-yard field goal (Drive: 10 plays, 44 yards, 2:48; Arizona State 15–7)
- (0:00) UCLA – Ka'imi Fairbairn 53-yard field goal (Drive: 4 plays, 40 yards, 0:21; Arizona State 15–10)

Third quarter

- (11:05) ASU – Mike Bercovici 34-yard run, Zane Gonzalez kick (Drive: 6 plays, 64 yards, 2:16; Arizona State 22–10)
- (7:56) ASU – D.J. Foster 11-yard pass from Mike Bercovici, Zane Gonzalez kick (Drive: 6 plays, 63 yards, 2:26; Arizona State 29–10)

Fourth quarter

- (13:52) UCLA – Paul Perkins 1-yard run, two-point pass failed (Drive: 6 plays, 70 yards, 1:32; Arizona State 29–16)
- (9:19) UCLA – Thomas Duarte 17-yard pass from Josh Rosen, Ka'imi Fairbairn kick (Drive: 4 plays, 38 yards, 1:28; Arizona State 29–23)
- (4:16) ASU – Team safety (Arizona State 31–23)
- (0:45) ASU – Kalen Ballage 23-yard run, Zane Gonzalez kick (Drive: 9 plays, 70 yards, 3:25; Arizona State 38–23)

Statistics	ASU	UCLA
First downs	25	17
Total yards	465	342
Rushing yards	46–192	28–62
Passing yards	273	280
Passing: Comp–Att–Int	27–44–1	22–40–1
Time of possession	37:47	22:13

Team	Category	Player	Statistics
Arizona State	Passing	Mike Bercovici	27/44, 273 yards, 2 TD, INT
Arizona State	Rushing	Demario Richard	23 carries, 79 yards
Arizona State	Receiving	D. J. Foster	4 receptions, 57 yards, TD
UCLA	Passing	Josh Rosen	22/40, 280 yards, 2 TD, INT
UCLA	Rushing	Paul Perkins	18 carries, 63 yards, TD
UCLA	Receiving	Thomas Duarte	6 receptions, 101 yards, 2 TD

=== vs Colorado ===
Colorado Buffaloes (3–2) vs Arizona State Sun Devils (3–2) – Game summary

Quarter	1	2	3	4	Total
Buffaloes	7	3	7	6	23
Sun Devils	17	7	14	10	48

at Sun Devil Stadium • Tempe, AZ

- Date: October 10, 2015
- Game time: 7:00 p.m.
- Game weather: Partly cloudy, 92 °F (33 °C)
- Game attendance: 44,157
- Referee: Michael Mothershed
- TV announcers (Pac-12 Network): Kevin Calabro (play-by-play), Yogi Roth (analyst), Lewis Johnson (sideline reporter)

Game information

First quarter

- (11:02) ASU – Kody Kohl 28-yard run, Zane Gonzalez kick (Drive: 4 plays, 91 yards, 1:30; Arizona State 7–0)
- (8:33) ASU – Kody Kohl 4-yard pass from Mike Bercovici, Zane Gonzalez kick (Drive: 5 plays, 15 yards, 2:08; Arizona State 14–0)
- (7:12) COLO – Phillip Lindsay 16-yard run, Diego Gonzalez kick (Drive: 4 plays, 75 yards, 1:21; Arizona State 14–7)
- (0:46) ASU – Zane Gonzalez 22-yard field goal (Drive: 4 plays, 8 yards, 1:31; Arizona State 17–7)

Second quarter

- (14:13) ASU – Tim White 38-yard pass from Mike Bercovici, Zane Gonzalez kick (Drive: 2 plays, 57 yards, 0:38; Arizona State 24–7)
- (0:05) COLO – Diego Gonzalez 27-yard field goal (Drive: 11 plays, 72 yards, 2:35; Arizona State 24–10)

Third quarter

- (11:39) ASU – Tim White 45-yard pass from Mike Bercovici, Zane Gonzalez kick (Drive: 8 plays, 75 yards, 3:21; Arizona State 31–10)
- (7:28) ASU – Devin Lucien 10-yard pass from Mike Bercovici, Zane Gonzalez kick (Drive: 5 plays, 35 yards, 2:09; Arizona 38–10)
- (6:05) COLO – Devin Ross 68-yard pass from Sefo Liufau, Diego Gonzalez kick (Drive: 3 plays, 75 yards, 1:23; Arizona State 38–17)

Fourth quarter

- (14:52) ASU – Zane Gonzalez 26-yard field goal (Drive: 12 plays, 57 yards, 6:06; Arizona State 41–17)
- (13:13) COLO – Phillip Lindsay 2-yard run, two-point pass failed (Drive: 4 plays, 75 yards, 1:39; Arizona State 41–23)
- (10:21) ASU – D. J. Foster 12-yard pass from Mike Bercovici, Zane Gonzalez kick (Drive: 5 plays, 84 yards, 2:47; Arizona State 48–23)

Statistics	COLO	ASU
First downs	19	21
Total yards	450	491
Rushing yards	28–49	40–231
Passing yards	401	260
Passing: Comp–Att–Int	26–41–1	20–31–1
Time of possession	26:36	33:24

Team	Category	Player	Statistics
Colorado	Passing	Sefo Liufau	25/40, 389 yards, TD, INT
Colorado	Rushing	Phillip Lindsay	9 carries, 43 yards, 2 TD
Colorado	Receiving	Shay Fields	5 receptions, 103 yards
Arizona State	Passing	Mike Bercovici	20/31, 260 yards, 5 TD, INT
Arizona State	Rushing	D. J. Foster	5 carries, 80 yards
Arizona State	Receiving	Tim White	7 receptions, 144 yards, 2 TD

=== at No. 4 Utah ===
Arizona State Sun Devils (4–2) at No. 4 Utah Utes (5–0) – Game summary

Quarter	1	2	3	4	Total
Sun Devils	10	0	8	0	18
No. 4 Utes	7	7	0	20	34

at Rice-Eccles Stadium • Salt Lake City, UT

- Date: October 17, 2015
- Game time: 7:00 p.m.
- Game weather: Cloudy & Rain, 59 °F (15 °C)
- Game attendance: 46,192
- Referee: Chris Coyte
- TV announcers (ESPN): Mark Jones (play-by-play), Rod Gilmore (analyst), Quint Kessenich (sideline reporter)

Game information

First quarter

- (4:56) UTAH – Harris Handley 2-yard pass from Travis Wilson, Andy Phillips kick (Drive: 7 plays, 69 yards, 3:59; Utah 7–0)
- (4:42) ASU – Tim White 100-yard kickoff return, Zane Gonzalez kick (Tied 7–7)
- (2:18) ASU – Zane Gonzalez 34-yard field goal (Drive: 4 plays, -3 yards, 0:45; Arizona State 10–7)

Second quarter

- (13:49) UTAH – Kenneth Scott 11-yard pass from Travis Wilson, Andy Phillips kick (Drive: 8 plays, 75 yards, 3:29; Utah 14–10)

Third quarter

- (5:04) ASU – Zane Gonzalez 28-yard field goal (Drive: 6 plays, 70 yards, 1:29; Utah 14–13)
- (5:04) ASU – Team safety (Arizona State 15–14)
- (1:30) ASU – Zane Gonzalez 44-yard field goal (Drive: 9 plays, 38 yards, 3:23; Arizona State 18–14)

Fourth quarter

- (10:41) UTAH – Devontae Booker 25-yard run, Andy Phillips kick (Drive: 3 plays, 32 yards, 1:23; Utah 21–18)
- (6:35) UTAH – Andy Phillips 43-yard field goal (Drive: 7 plays, 8 yards, 2:50; Utah 24–18)
- (4:20) UTAH – Andy Phillips 35-yard field goal (Drive: 4 plays, 6 yards, 2:08; Utah 27–18)
- (1:11) UTAH – Devontae Booker 62-yard run, Andy Phillips kick (Drive: 3 plays, 67 yards, 0:22; Utah 34–18)

Statistics	ASU	UTAH
First downs	12	16
Total yards	257	369
Rushing yards	28–15	31–72
Passing yards	242	297
Passing: Comp–Att–Int	20–42–1	26–36–0
Time of possession	26:45	33:15

Team	Category	Player	Statistics
Arizona State	Passing	Mike Bercovici	20/41, 242 yards, INT
Arizona State	Rushing	Kalen Ballage	18 carries, 49 yards
Arizona State	Receiving	Devin Lucien	6 receptions, 118 yards
Utah	Passing	Travis Wilson	26/36, 297 yards, 2 TD
Utah	Rushing	Devontae Booker	21 carries, 118 yards, 2 TD
Utah	Receiving	Kenneth Scott	5 receptions, 116 yards, TD

=== vs Oregon ===
Oregon Ducks (4–3) vs Arizona State Sun Devils (4–3) – Game summary

Quarter	1	2	3	4	OT	2OT	3OT	Total
Ducks	10	7	17	7	7	7	6	61
Sun Devils	0	14	17	10	7	7	0	55

at Sun Devil Stadium • Tempe, AZ

- Date: October 29, 2015
- Game time: 7:30 p.m.
- Game weather: Partly Cloudy, 68 °F (20 °C)
- Game attendance: 56,535
- Referee: Land Clark
- TV announcers (ESPN): Joe Tessitore (play-by-play), Jesse Palmer (analyst), David Pollack (analyst), Kaylee Hartung (sideline reporter)

Game information

First quarter

- (12:46) ORE – Aidan Schneider 24-yard field goal (Drive: 6 plays, 63 yards, 2:14; Oregon 3–0 )
- (5:21) ORE – Royce Freeman 64-yard run, Aidan Schneider kick (Drive: 3 plays, 73 yards, 1:11; Oregon 10–0)

Second quarter

- (6:36) ASU – Devin Lucien 3-yard pass from Mike Bercovici, Zane Gonzalez kick (Drive: 8 plays, 80 yards, 3:20; Oregon 10–7)
- (4:00) ORE – Darren Carrington 39-yard pass from Vernon Adams, Aidan Schneider kick (Drive: 7 plays, 74 yards, 2:30; Oregon 17–7)
- (2:33) ASU – Gary Chambers 39-yard pass from Mike Bercovici, Zane Gonzalez kick (Drive: 6 plays, 75 yards, 1:27; Oregon 17–14)

Third quarter

- (11:39) ASU – Zane Gonzalez 28-yard field goal (Drive: 13 plays, 65 yards, 3:21; Tied 17–17 )
- (9:27) ASU – Demario Richard 22-yard run, Zane Gonzalez kick (Drive: 4 plays, 41 yards, 2:06; Arizona State 24–17)
- (6:03) ORE – Aidan Schneider 37-yard field goal (Drive: 11 plays, 56 yards, 3:24; Arizona State 24–20 )
- (4:06) ASU – Demario Richard 1-yard pass from Mike Bercovici, Zane Gonzalez kick (Drive: 6 plays, 75 yards, 1:57; Arizona State 31–20)
- (3:53) ORE – Charles Nelson 100-yard kickoff return, Aidan Schneider kick (Arizona State 31–27)
- (1:36) ORE – Kani Benoit 62-yard run, Aidan Schneider kick (Drive: 2 plays, 70 yards, 0:40; Oregon 34–31)

Fourth quarter

- (12:41) ASU – Zane Gonzalez 33-yard field goal (Drive: 10 plays, 52 yards, 3:45; Tied 34–34)
- (7:49) ASU – Kody Kohl 5-yard pass from Mike Bercovici, Zane Gonzalez kick (Drive: 9 plays, 62 yards, 2:52; Arizona State 41–34)
- (0:12) ORE – Dwayne Stanford 8-yard pass from Vernon Adams, Aidan Schneider kick (Drive: 13 plays, 60 yards, 4:50; Tied 41–41)

First overtime

- ORE – Dwayne Stanford 25-yard pass from Vernon Adams, Aidan Schneider kick (Drive: 1 play, 25 yards; Oregon 48–41)
- ASU – Tim White 2-yard pass from Mike Bercovici, Zane Gonzalez kick (Drive: 6 plays, 25 yards; Tied 48–48)

Second overtime

- ASU – Mike Bercovici 18-yard run, Zane Gonzalez kick (Drive: 3 plays, 25 yards; Arizona State 55–48)
- ORE – Royce Freeman 1-yard run, Aidan Schneider kick (Drive: 5 plays, 25 yards; Tied 55–55)

Third overtime

- ORE – Bralon Addison 20-yard pass from Vernon Adams, two-point pass failed (Drive: 2 plays, 25 yards; Oregon 61–55)

Statistics	ORE	ASU
First downs	19	37
Total yards	499	742
Rushing yards	28–184	55–344
Passing yards	315	398
Passing: Comp–Att–Int	23–41–1	32–53–2
Time of possession	24:09	35:51

Team	Category	Player	Statistics
Oregon	Passing	Vernon Adams	23/40, 315 yards, 4 TD, INT
Oregon	Rushing	Royce Freeman	15 carries, 110 yards, 2 TD
Oregon	Receiving	Darren Carrington	5 receptions, 107 yards, TD
Arizona State	Passing	Mike Bercovici	32/53, 398 yards, 5 TD, 2 INT
Arizona State	Rushing	Demario Richard	19 carries, 135 yards, TD
Arizona State	Receiving	Tim White	9 receptions, 97 yards, TD

=== at Washington State ===
Arizona State Sun Devils (4–4) at Washington State Cougars (5–3) – Game summary

Quarter	1	2	3	4	Total
Sun Devils	14	0	7	3	24
Cougars	0	10	7	21	38

at Martin Stadium • Pullman, WA

- Date: November 7, 2015
- Game time: 1:30 p.m.
- Game weather: Clear, 50 °F (10 °C)
- Game attendance: 32,852
- Referee: Mark Duddy
- TV announcers (FS1): Tim Brando (play-by-play), Spencer Tillman (analyst)

Game information

First quarter

- (11:48) ASU – Demario Richard 6-yard run, Zane Gonzalez kick (Drive: 8 plays, 70 yards, 2:13; Arizona State 7–0)
- (8:23) ASU – Kalen Ballage 9-yard run, Zane Gonzalez kick (Drive: 10 plays, 64 yards, 2:20; Arizona State 14–0)

Second quarter

- (14:10) WSU – Erik Powell 22-yard field goal (Drive: 17 plays, 92 yards, 7:12; Arizona State 14–3)
- (5:26) WSU – Dom Williams 11-yard pass from Luke Falk, Erik Powell kick (Drive: 4 plays, 16 yards, 1:44; Arizona State 14–10)

Third quarter

- (7:57) WSU – Keith Harrington 23-yard pass from Luke Falk, Erik Powell kick (Drive: 9 plays, 94 yards, 3:47; Washington State 17–14)
- (1:27) ASU – Mike Bercovici 1-yard run, Zane Gonzalez kick (Drive: 17 plays, 65 yards, 6:25; Arizona State 21–17)

Fourth quarter

- (13:12) WSU – John Thompson 8-yard pass from Luke Falk, Erik Powell kick (Drive: 8 plays, 73 yards, 3:09; Washington State 24–21)
- (8:01) WSU – Jamal Morrow 12-yard pass from Luke Falk, Erik Powell kick (Drive: 7 plays, 99 yards, 2:52; Washington State 31–21)
- (4:13) ASU – Zane Gonzalez 22-yard field goal (Drive: 6 plays, 31 yards, 2:04; Washington State 31–24)
- (4:00) WSU – Dom Williams 75-yard pass from Luke Falk, Erik Powell kick (Drive: 1 play, 75 yards, 0:13; Washington State 38–24)

Statistics	ASU	WSU
First downs	24	22
Total yards	458	512
Rushing yards	42–202	17–15
Passing yards	256	497
Passing: Comp–Att–Int	28–45–1	36–55–1
Time of possession	30:17	29:43

Team	Category	Player	Statistics
Arizona State	Passing	Mike Bercovici	27/44, 229 yards, INT
Arizona State	Rushing	Demario Richard	18 carries, 111 yards, TD
Arizona State	Receiving	D. J. Foster	7 receptions, 71 yards
Washington State	Passing	Luke Falk	36/55, 497 yards, 5 TD, INT
Washington State	Rushing	Jamal Morrow	4 carries, 23 yards
Washington State	Receiving	Dom Williams	6 receptions, 123 yards, 2 TD

=== vs Washington ===
Washington Huskies (4–5) vs Arizona State Sun Devils (4–5) – Game summary

Quarter	1	2	3	4	Total
Huskies	10	7	0	0	17
Sun Devils	0	3	7	17	27

at Sun Devil Stadium • Tempe, AZ

- Date: November 14, 2015
- Game time: 1:00 p.m.
- Game weather: Mostly Clear, 74 °F (23 °C)
- Game attendance: 51,695
- Referee: Steve Strimling
- TV announcers (FS1): Kevin Calabro (play-by-play), Yogi Roth (analyst), Lewis Johnson (sideline reporter)

Game information

First quarter

- (9:57) WASH – Cameron Van Winkle 35-yard field goal (Drive: 5 plays, 48 yards, 1:03; Washington 3–0)
- (6:50) WASH – Myles Gaskin 1-yard run, Cameron Van Winkle kick (Drive: 7 plays, 77 yards, 1:37; Washington 10–0)

Second quarter

- (8:20) WASH – Darrell Daniels 29-yard pass from Jake Browning, Cameron Van Winkle kick (Drive: 8 plays, 67 yards, 2:16; Washington 17–0)
- (2:21) ASU – Zane Gonzalez 40-yard field goal (Drive: 6 plays, 32 yards, 2:25; Washington 17–3)

Third quarter

- (9:56) ASU – Kalen Ballage 3-yard run, Zane Gonzalez kick (Drive: 5 plays, 60 yards, 1:29; Washington 17–10)

Fourth quarter

- (13:52) ASU – Devin Lucien 32-yard pass from Mike Bercovici, Zane Gonzalez kick (Drive: 7 plays, 71 yards, 1:57; Tied 17–17)
- (8:25) ASU – Zane Gonzalez 23-yard field goal (Drive: 12 plays, 62 yards, 4:32; Arizona State 20–17)
- (5:59) ASU – Kalen Ballage 48-yard run, Zane Gonzalez kick (Drive: 1 play, 48 yards, 0:10; Arizona State 27–17)

Statistics	WASH	ASU
First downs	27	19
Total yards	547	397
Rushing yards	34–142	43–144
Passing yards	405	253
Passing: Comp–Att–Int	28–52–3	22–34–0
Time of possession	30:48	29:12

Team	Category	Player	Statistics
Washington	Passing	Jake Browning	28/52, 405 yards, TD, 3 INT
Washington	Rushing	Myles Gaskin	18 carries, 108 yards, TD
Washington	Receiving	Jaydon Mickens	5 receptions, 100 yards
Arizona State	Passing	Mike Bercovici	22/34, 253 yards, TD
Arizona State	Rushing	Kalen Ballage	11 carries, 92 yards, 2 TD
Arizona State	Receiving	Devin Lucien	4 receptions, 63 yards, TD

=== vs Arizona ===
Arizona Wildcats (6–5) vs Arizona State Sun Devils (5–5) – Game summary

Quarter	1	2	3	4	Total
Wildcats	0	10	13	14	37
Sun Devils	14	17	0	21	52

at Sun Devil Stadium • Tempe, AZ

- Date: November 21, 2015
- Game time: 1:30 p.m. MST
- Game weather: Clear skies, 80 °F (27 °C)
- Game attendance: 64,885
- Referee: Michael Mothershed
- TV announcers (FS1): Tim Brando (play-by-play), Spencer Tillman (analyst)

Game information

First quarter

- (3:01) ASU – Demario Richard 8-yard run, Zane Gonzalez kick (Drive: 3 plays, 66 yards, 0:55; Arizona State 7–0)
- (1:07) ASU – Devin Lucien 59-yard pass from Mike Bercovici, Zane Gonzalez kick (Drive: 3 plays, 78 yards, 0:57; Arizona State 14–0)

Second quarter

- (14:27) ARIZ – Cam Denson 21-yard interception return, Casey Skowron kick (Arizona State 14–7)
- (10:33) ASU – Mike Bercovici 1-yard run, Zane Gonzalez kick (Drive: 10 plays, 78 yards, 3:47; Arizona State 21–7)
- (5:47) ARIZ – Casey Skowron 22-yard field goal (Drive: 9 plays, 70 yards, 4:39; Arizona State 21–10)
- (4:00) ASU – Jalen Harvey 41-yard pass from Mike Bercovici, Zane Gonzalez kick (Drive: 5 plays, 70 yards, 1:38; Arizona State 28–10)
- (0:00) ASU – Zane Gonzalez 29-yard field goal (Drive: 6 plays, 67 yards, 2:22; Arizona State 31–10)

Third quarter

- (11:32) ARIZ – Casey Skowron 37-yard field goal (Drive: 7 plays, 21 yards, 2:11; Arizona State 31–13)
- (3:35) ARIZ – Casey Skowron 46-yard field goal (Drive: 9 plays, 63 yards, 3:17; Arizona State 31–16)
- (0:46) ARIZ – Trey Griffey 95-yard pass from Brandon Dawkins, Casey Skowron kick (Drive: 2 plays, 97 yards, 0:54; Arizona State 31–23)

Fourth quarter

- (10:14) ASU – D.J. Foster 1-yard run, Zane Gonzalez kick (Drive: 11 plays, 74 yards, 5:24 Arizona State 38–23)
- (6:50) ARIZ – Tyrell Johnson 17-yard pass from Brandon Dawkins, Casey Skowron kick (Drive: 9 plays, 75 yards, 3:24; Arizona State 38–30)
- (3:33) ASU – Kareem Orr 21-yard interception return, Zane Gonzalez kick (Arizona State 45–30)
- (2:30) ASU – Lloyd Carrinton 38-yard interception return, Zane Gonzalez kick (Arizona State 52–30)
- (0:32) ARIZ – Brandon Dawkins 24-yard run, Casey Skowron kick (Drive: 11 plays, 75 yards, 1:58; Arizona State 52–37)

Statistics	ARIZ	ASU
First downs	19	24
Total yards	449	566
Rushing yards	35–113	48–250
Passing yards	336	316
Passing: Comp–Att–Int	20–43–2	21–32–1
Time of possession	27:36	32:24

Team	Category	Player	Statistics
Arizona	Passing	Brandon Dawkins	16/30, 301 yards, 2 TD, 2 INT
Arizona	Rushing	Brandon Dawkins	21 carries, 78 yards, TD
Arizona	Receiving	Trey Griffey	2 receptions, 138 yards, TD
Arizona State	Passing	Mike Bercovici	21/32, 316 yards, 2 TD, INT
Arizona State	Rushing	Kalen Ballage	18 carries, 110 yards
Arizona State	Receiving	Devin Lucien	9 receptions, 191 yards, TD

=== at California ===
Arizona State Sun Devils (6–5) at California Golden Bears (6–5) – Game summary

Quarter	1	2	3	4	Total
Sun Devils	10	17	6	13	46
Golden Bears	3	7	21	17	48

at California Memorial Stadium • Berkeley, CA

- Date: November 28, 2015
- Game time: 8:00 p.m.
- Game weather: Clear, 46 °F (8 °C)
- Game attendance: 45,385
- Referee: Land Clark
- TV announcers (FS1): Justin Kutcher (play-by-play), Steve Hutchinson (analyst)

Game information

First quarter

- (9:32) ASU – Zane Gonzalez 21-yard field goal (Drive: 15 plays, 72 yards, 5:28; Arizona State 3–0)
- (5:42) CAL – Matt Anderson 39-yard field goal (Drive: 9 plays, 47 yards, 3:44; Tied 3–3)
- (1:54) ASU – Devin Lucien 9-yard pass from Mike Bercovici, Zane Gonzalez kick (Drive: 3 plays, 10 yards, 0:35; Arizona State 10–3)

Second quarter

- (11:00) ASU – Devin Lucien 3-yard pass from Mike Bercovici, Zane Gonzalez kick (Drive: 9 plays, 71 yards, 3:47; Arizona State 17–3)
- (8:46) ASU – Devin Lucien 36-yard pass from Mike Bercovici, Zane Gonzalez kick (Drive: 4 plays, 51 yards, 1:12; Arizona State 24–3)
- (7:06) CAL – Bryce Treggs 52-yard pass from Jared Goff, Matt Anderson kick (Drive: 5 plays, 75 yards, 1:40; Arizona State 24–10)
- (3:31) ASU – Zane Gonzalez 45-yard field goal (Drive: 10 plays, 42 yards, 3:29; Arizona State 27–10)

Third quarter

- (11:04) CAL – Tre Watson 5-yard run, Matt Anderson kick (Drive: 6 plays, 94 yards, 1:17; Arizona State 27–17)
- (7:46) ASU – Zane Gonzalez 25-yard field goal (Drive: 9 plays, 48 yards, 3:07; Arizona State 30–17)
- (6:36) CAL – Chad Hansen 16-yard pass from Jared Goff, Matt Anderson kick (Drive: 6 plays, 75 yards, 1:10; Arizona State 30–24)
- (4:41) ASU – Zane Gonzalez 31-yard field goal (Drive: 6 plays, 52 yards, 1:55; Arizona State 33–24)
- (1:31) CAL – Maurice Harris 9-yard pass from Jared Goff, Matt Anderson kick (Drive: 10 plays, 75 yards, 3:10; Arizona State 33–31)

Fourth quarter

- (9:55) ASU – Zane Gonzalez 34-yard field goal (Drive: 15 plays, 71 yards, 6:29; Arizona State 36–31)
- (9:13) CAL – Khalfani Muhammad 58-yard pass from Jared Goff, two-point run failed (Drive: 3 plays, 71 yards, 0:35; California 37–36)
- (7:43) ASU – Zane Gonzalez 22-yard field goal (Drive: 6 plays, 62 yards, 1:23; Arizona State 39–37)
- (6:05) CAL – Darius Powe 49-yard pass from Jared Goff, Jared Goff run for two-point conversion (Drive: 4 plays, 75 yards, 1:38; California 45–39)
- (2:35) ASU – Raymond Epps 4-yard pass from Mike Bercovici, Zane Gonzalez kick (Drive: 9 plays, 76 yards, 3:23; Arizona State 46–45)
- (0:00) CAL – Matt Anderson 26-yard field goal (Drive: 9 plays, 69 yards, 2:29; California 48–46)

Statistics	ASU	CAL
First downs	28	28
Total yards	586	680
Rushing yards	52–191	22–138
Passing yards	395	542
Passing: Comp–Att–Int	27–43–0	30–51–0
Time of possession	37:38	22:22

Team	Category	Player	Statistics
Arizona State	Passing	Mike Bercovici	27/43, 395 yards, 4 TD
Arizona State	Rushing	Demario Richard	33 carries, 131 yards
Arizona State	Receiving	Devin Lucien	8 receptions, 200 yards, 3 TD
California	Passing	Jared Goff	30/51, 542 yards, 5 TD
California	Rushing	Tre Watson	15 carries, 92 yards, TD
California	Receiving	Bryce Treggs	5 receptions, 147 yards, TD

=== vs West Virginia (Cactus Bowl) ===
Arizona State Sun Devils (6–6) vs West Virginia Mountaineers (7–5) – Game summary
(2016 Motel 6 Cactus Bowl)

Quarter	1	2	3	4	Total
Sun Devils	3	15	14	10	42
Mountaineers	9	13	14	7	43

at Chase Field • Phoenix, AZ

- Date: January 2, 2016
- Game time: 1:00 p.m.
- Game weather: None (Retractable roof closed)
- Game attendance: 39,321
- Referee: Jeff Servinski
- TV announcers (ESPN): Dave Neal (play-by-play), Matt Stinchcomb (analyst), Kayce Smith (sideline reporter)

Game information

First Quarter

- (12:02) WVU – Josh Lambert 21-yard field goal (Drive: 9 plays, 71 yards, 2:58; West Virginia 3–0)
- (8:57) WVU – Josh Lambert 31-yard field goal (Drive: 8 plays, 56 yards, 2:25; West Virginia 6–0)
- (5:06) ASU – Zane Gonzalez 37-yard field goal (Drive: 4 plays, 2 yards, 1:30; West Virginia 6–3)
- (3:13) WVU – Josh Lambert 27-yard field goal (Drive: 6 plays, 55 yards, 1:53; West Virginia 9–3)

Second Quarter

- (9:59) ASU – Devin Lucien 19-yard pass from Mike Bercovici, Zane Gonzalez kick (Drive: 4 plays, 40 yards, 1:06; Arizona State 10–9)
- (6:02) WVU – Shelton Gibson 59-yard pass from Skyler Howard, Josh Lambert kick (Drive: 3 plays, 80 yards, 0:39; West Virginia 16–10)
- (2:53) ASU – Zane Gonzalez 19-yard field goal (Drive: 10 plays, 80 yards, 3:00; West Virginia 16–13)
- (0:28) WVU – Daikiel Shorts 10-yard pass from Skyler Howard, kick failed (Drive: 8 plays, 75 yards, 2:25; West Virginia 22–13)
- (0:28) ASU – Tim White 98-yard blocked PAT return (West Virginia 22–15)
- (0:01) ASU – Zane Gonzalez 35-yard field goal (Drive: 4 plays, 34 yards, 0:26; West Virginia 22–18)

Third Quarter

- (11:34) ASU – Tim White 2-yard pass from Mike Bercovici, Zane Gonzalez kick (Drive: 8 plays, 66 yards, 3:17; Arizona State 25–22)
- (10:02) WVU – Gary Jennings 64-yard pass from Skyler Howard, Josh Lambert kick (Drive: 5 plays, 75 yards, 1:32; West Virginia 29–25)
- (4:35) ASU – Tim White 33-yard pass from Mike Bercovici, Zane Gonzalez kick (Drive: 6 plays, 66 yards, 2:26; Arizona State 32–29)
- (3:01) WVU – Daikiel Shorts 17-yard pass from Skyler Howard, Josh Lambert kick (Drive: 4 plays, 75 yards, 1:34; West Virginia 36–32)

Fourth Quarter

- (14:09) ASU – Zane Gonzalez 48-yard field goal (Drive: 4 plays, 5 yards, 1:09; West Virginia 36–35)
- (4:56) ASU – Gary Chambers 58-yard pass from Mike Bercovici, Zane Gonzalez kick (Drive: 4 plays, 73 yards, 1:23; Arizona State 42–36)
- (2:19) WVU – David Sills 15-yard pass from Skyler Howard, Josh Lambert kick (Drive: 10 plays, 75 yards, 2:37; West Virginia 43–42)

Statistics	ASU	WVU
First downs	23	29
Total yards	520	676
Rushing yards	32–102	33–144
Passing yards	418	532
Passing: Comp–Att–Int	29–52–0	28–51–2
Time of possession	30:58	29:02

Team	Category	Player	Statistics
Arizona State	Passing	Mike Bercovici	29/52, 418 yards, 4 TD
Arizona State	Rushing	Demario Richard	11 carries, 48 yards
Arizona State	Receiving	Devin Lucien	9 receptions, 144 yards, TD
West Virginia	Passing	Skyler Howard	28/51, 532 yards, 5 TD, 2 INT
West Virginia	Rushing	Wendell Smallwood	13 carries, 72 yards
West Virginia	Receiving	Shelton Gibson	4 receptions, 143 yards, TD

West Virginia quarterback Skyler Howard was named Offensive MVP.

West Virginia linebacker Shaq Petteway was named Defensive MVP.

== Rankings ==
Ranking movements Legend: ██ Increase in ranking ██ Decrease in ranking — = Not ranked RV = Received votes
	Week															
Poll	Pre	1	2	3	4	5	6	7	8	9	10	11	12	13	14	Final
AP	15	RV	RV	RV	—	RV	RV	RV	—	—	—	—	—	—	—	
Coaches	16	RV	RV	RV	—	RV	RV	—	—	—	—	—	—	—	—	
CFP	Not released									—	—	—	—	—	—	Not released
