= Royce Freeman =

American football player (born 1996)

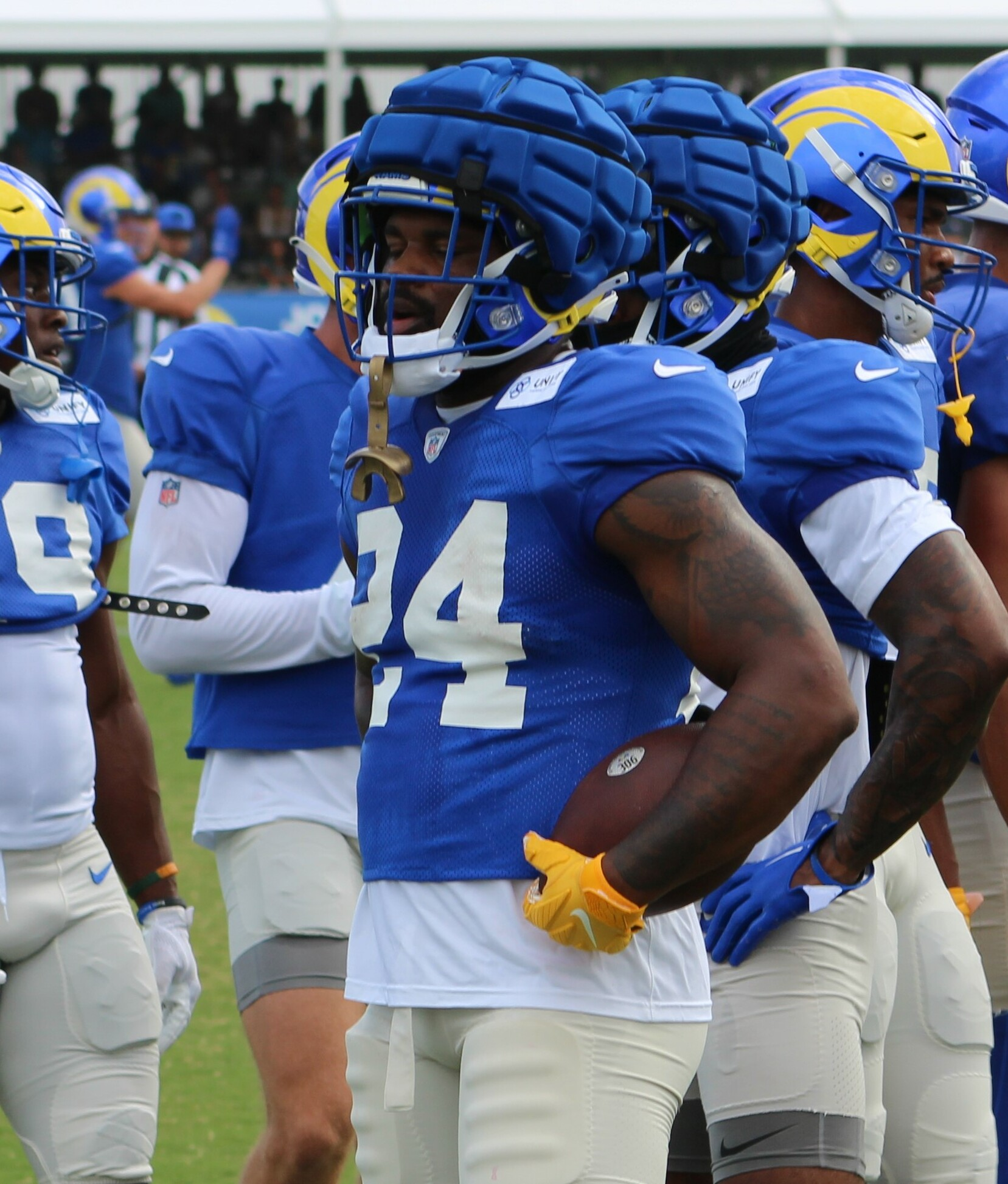
- Freeman with the Los Angeles Rams in 2023

Profile
- Position: Running back

Personal information
- Born: February 24, 1996 (age 30); Imperial, California, U.S.
- Listed height: 6 ft 0 in (1.83 m)
- Listed weight: 238 lb (108 kg)

Career information
- High school: Imperial
- College: Oregon (2014–2017)
- NFL draft: 2018: 3rd round, 71st overall pick

Career history
- Denver Broncos (2018–2020); Carolina Panthers (2021); Houston Texans (2021–2022); Los Angeles Rams (2023); Dallas Cowboys (2024)*; Cleveland Browns (2024)*; Chicago Bears (2024)*; Los Angeles Rams (2024); Chicago Bears (2025)*; Los Angeles Chargers (2025)*
- * Offseason or practice squad member only

Awards and highlights
- Third-team All-American (2015); First-team All-Pac-12 (2015); 2× Second-team All-Pac-12 (2014, 2017); Pac-12 Offensive Freshman of the Year (2014)

Career NFL statistics as of 2025
- Rushing yards: 1,792
- Rushing average: 3.8
- Rushing touchdowns: 10
- Receptions: 86
- Receiving yards: 532
- Receiving touchdowns: 1
- Stats at Pro Football Reference

Royce Deion Freeman (born February 24, 1996) is an American professional football running back. He played college football for the Oregon Ducks, earning third-team All-American honors in 2015.

== Early life ==
Freeman attended Imperial High School in Imperial, California, where he played running back for the Tigers high school football team. Freeman made his varsity debut as a freshman against Southwest High School. His second career carry was a 63-yard touchdown run. He finished his freshman year with 225 yards on 26 carries and one rushing touchdown. As a sophomore, he ran for 2,075 yards on 162 carries and ran for 35 touchdowns. He also caught 14 passes for 153 yards and added two receiving touchdowns and returned two interceptions for touchdowns. As a junior, he ran for 2,482 yards on 201 carries and ran for 34 touchdowns. He caught 10 passes for 137 yards and had two touchdown receptions. As a senior, he ran for 2,824 yards on 256 carries and ran for 41 touchdowns. He also caught 8 passes for 116 yards and added two receiving touchdowns. He finished his high school playing career with 7,606 rushing yards on 645 carries (11.8 yards per carry) and ran for 111 touchdowns. Freeman also recorded six receiving touchdowns and two interceptions returned for touchdown (119 total touchdowns).

During his senior season, Freeman set three CIF San Diego Section career records. Against Calexico High School, Freeman broke the career rushing record of 6,694 yards which was set by Ricky Seale of Escondido High School. The following week against Central High School, Freeman broke the career-rushing touchdown record of 105 set by Rashaan Salaam of La Jolla Country Day High School. In the final week of the regular season, Freeman broke the career-points-scored record of 697 points set by Dillon Baxter of Mission Bay High School.

Freeman is the San Diego Section record-holder for career rushing yards (7,606), career rushing touchdowns (111), and career points scored (724).

Freeman was considered a five-star recruit by Scout.com.

== College career ==
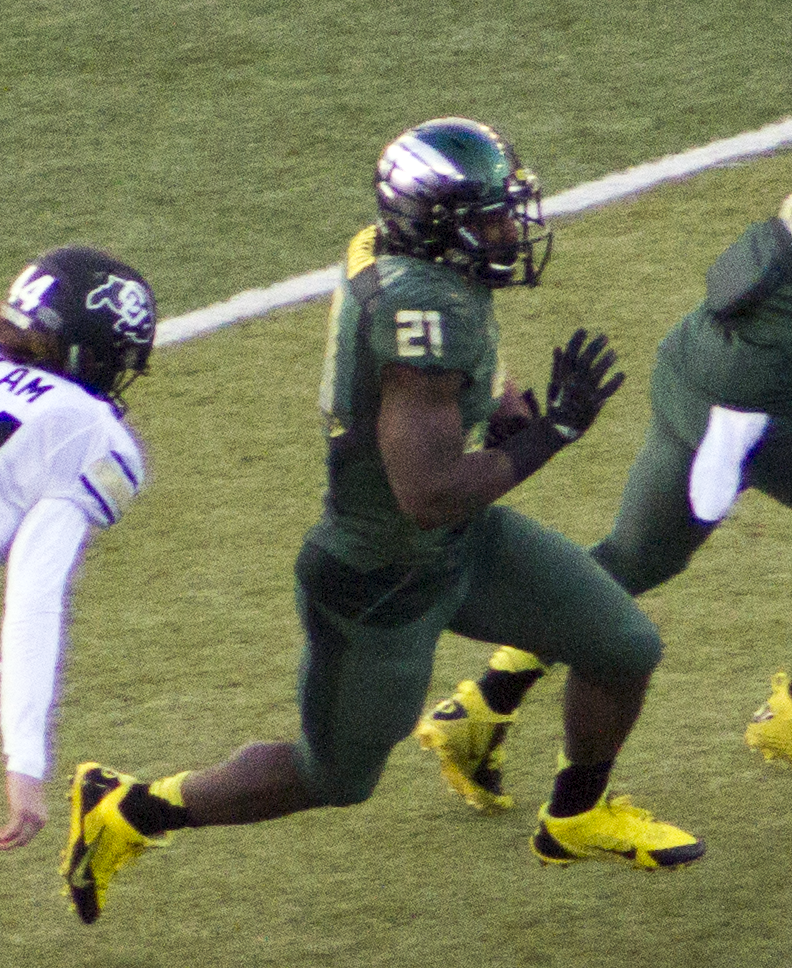
Freeman with the Oregon Ducks in 2014

Freeman came to Oregon as the highest rated recruit of the 2014 class. He immediately impressed coaches in practice and camp, and competed for the starting role with Byron Marshall and Thomas Tyner. All three were listed as co-starters at the running back position to start the 2014 season. Freeman, the heaviest of the three, established himself as a "power back," an element missing in the Oregon offense since the 2008 season. He finished the season with 252 carries for 1,365 rushing yards and 18 touchdowns, while having 16 receptions for 158 yards and one receiving touchdown. He even had a 26-yard passing touchdown to quarterback Marcus Mariota in a 31–24 loss to the Arizona Wildcats. At the end of the season, he was awarded Pac-12 Conference Offensive Freshman of the Year.

Freeman started the 2015 season off strong with 180 rushing yards and three rushing touchdowns against Eastern Washington. On October 3, against Colorado, he had 163 rushing yards and two rushing touchdowns in the 41–24 victory. The next week, against Washington State, he had 246 rushing yards, two rushing touchdowns, and a receiving touchdown in the 45–38 2OT loss. The next week, he rushed for 138 yards in a victory over Washington. In the next game, at Arizona State, he had 110 rushing yards and two rushing touchdowns in the victory. On November 27, against Oregon State, he had 167 rushing yards and two rushing touchdowns to go with 51 receiving yards. In the Alamo Bowl against TCU, he had 130 rushing yards and three rushing touchdowns in the 47–41 3OT loss. Overall, as a sophomore, Freeman had 1,836 rushing yards and 17 rushing touchdowns to go along with 26 receptions for 348 receiving yards and two receiving touchdowns. He led the Pac-12 in rushing touchdowns on the season.

In the 2016 season opener against UC Davis, Freeman had 87 rushing yards and two rushing touchdowns. In the next game, against Virginia, he had 207 rushing yards and two rushing touchdowns. On October 1, in a game at Washington State, he had 138 rushing yards and three rushing touchdowns. On November 19, against Utah, he had 129 rushing yards and a receiving touchdown. The following week he rushed for 106 yards in a loss to Oregon State in the annual Civil War game. Overall, as a junior, Freeman recorded 945 rushing yards and nine rushing touchdowns to go along with 23 receptions for 144 receiving yards and a receiving touchdown.

In the 2017 season opener against Southern Utah, Freeman had 150 rushing yards, four rushing touchdowns, and 50 receiving yards. In the next game, against Nebraska, he had 153 rushing yards and two rushing touchdowns. He continued his hot streak with 157 rushing yards and three rushing touchdowns against Wyoming in the following game. On October 14, against Stanford, he had 143 rushing yards but the Ducks lost 49–7. In the next game, he had 139 rushing yards against Utah. On November 18, against Arizona, he had 135 rushing yards and four rushing touchdowns. In his final collegiate game, he had 122 rushing yards and two rushing touchdowns against Oregon State in a 69–10 victory. Freeman scored two rushing TDs in the first half of to break OSU's Ken Simonton's all-time Pac-12 rushing touchdown record, which stood at 59 for 16 years. It would mark Royce's 60th rushing touchdown for the Ducks. He also piled up 122 rushing yards which moved him into seventh all-time in NCAA history. Overall, Freeman finished his stellar collegiate career with 1,475 rushing yards and 16 rushing touchdowns to go along with 14 receptions for 164 receiving yards in the 2017 season.

As of 2024, Freeman is the all-time rushing leader in Pacific-12 Conference history with 5,621 yards.

== Professional career ==
=== Pre-draft ===
On November 20, 2017, Freeman officially accepted his invitation to play in the 2018 Senior Bowl. Freeman sustained an injury and did not play in the Senior Bowl. Freeman attended the NFL Scouting Combine in Indianapolis and performed all of the combine and positional drills. He finished ninth among all running backs in the 40-yard dash, tied for 12th in the bench press, and also finished third among his position group in the three-cone drill and short shuttle. Freeman displayed quickness and agility especially for a running back of his size and was able to impress scouts with his overall performance. On March 15, 2018, Freeman participated at Oregon's pro day, but opted to stand on his combine numbers and only performed positional drills. At the conclusion of the pre-draft process, Freeman was projected to be a third round pick by NFL draft experts and scouts. He was ranked the eighth best running back in the draft by Scouts Inc. and was ranked the ninth best running back by DraftScout.com.

External videos
- Royce Freeman's NFL Combine Workout
- Royce Freeman runs the 40-yard dash

Pre-draft measurables
| Height | Weight | Arm length | Hand span | 40-yard dash | 10-yard split | 20-yard split | 20-yard shuttle | Three-cone drill | Vertical jump | Broad jump | Bench press |
|---|---|---|---|---|---|---|---|---|---|---|---|
| 5 ft 11 1/2 in (1.82 m) | 229 lb (104 kg) | 32 in (0.81 m) | 9 1/2 in (0.24 m) | 4.54 s | 1.60 s | 2.66 s | 4.16 s | 6.90 s | 34 in (0.86 m) | 9 ft 10 in (3.00 m) | 17 reps |
All values from NFL Combine

=== Denver Broncos ===
External videos
- Broncos draft Royce Freeman 71st overall
- Royce Freeman's College Highlights

==== 2018 season ====
The Denver Broncos selected Freeman in the third round (71st overall) of the 2018 NFL draft. Freeman was the eighth running back drafted in 2018. On July 5, 2018, the Broncos signed Freeman to a four-year, $3.94 million contract that includes a signing bonus of $997,020. Entering his first training camp, Freeman was slated to be the Broncos' starting running back, but he faced minor competition from Devontae Booker. After a very impressive training camp and preseason, head coach Vance Joseph officially named Freeman the starting running back to begin the season.

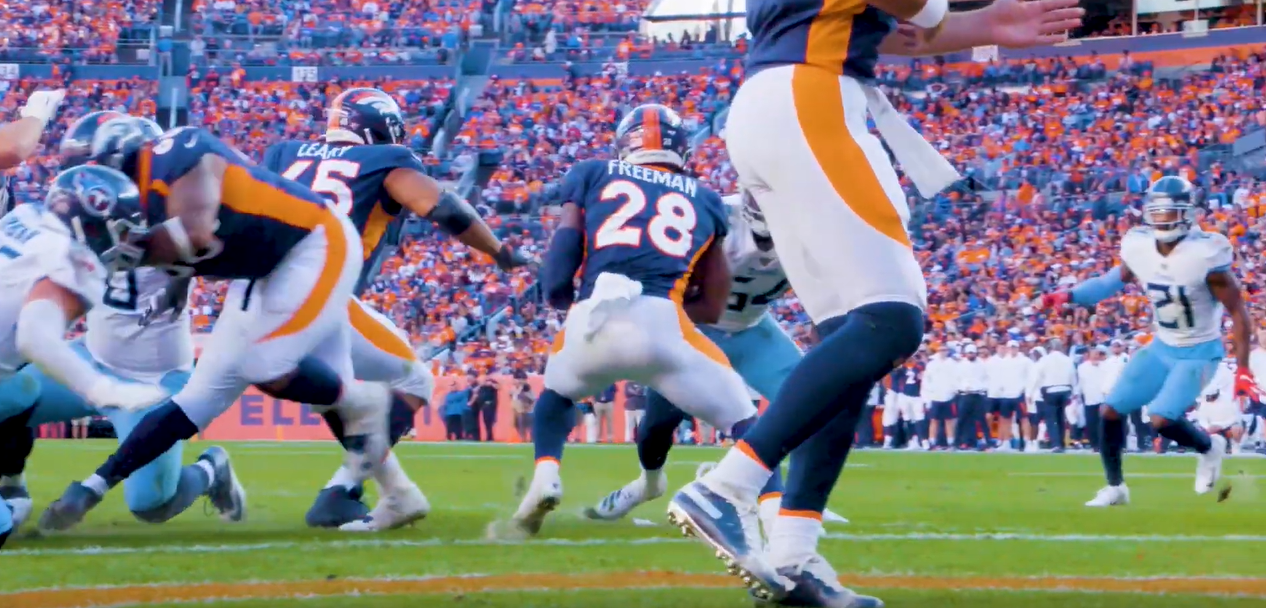
Freeman in a game against the Tennessee Titans

Freeman made his first career start and NFL regular-season debut in the Broncos' 27–24 victory over the Seattle Seahawks in the season opener. He had 15 carries for 71 rushing yards in the win. In the following game, Freeman scored his first professional rushing touchdown in the 20–19 victory over the Oakland Raiders. In Week 4, on Monday Night Football against the Kansas City Chiefs, Freeman had 8 carries for 67 rushing yards and a rushing touchdown for the third consecutive game. Against the Cardinals in Week 7, Freeman recorded 13 carries for 37 yards before suffering an ankle injury which kept him sidelined for two games. After returning from his injury, Freeman lost his starting job to fellow rookie Phillip Lindsay. Overall, Freeman finished his rookie season with 132 carries for 521 rushing yards and five rushing touchdowns.

==== 2019 season ====
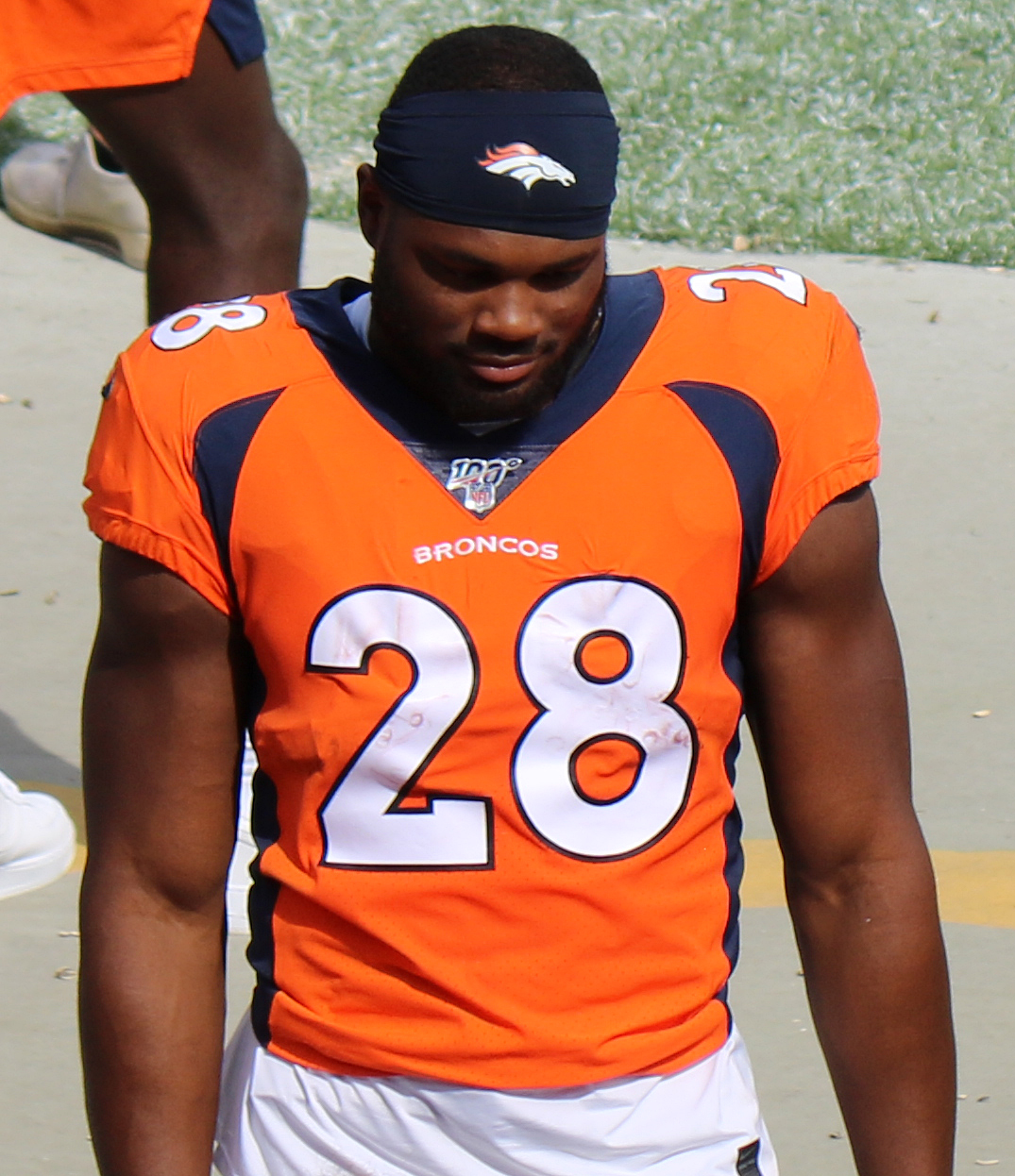
Freeman with the Denver Broncos in 2019

Heading into his second training camp, Freeman faced competition for the starting running back job from Phillip Lindsay. Although Freeman opened preseason as the Broncos' starting running back, he was surpassed by Lindsay on the depth chart. At the conclusion of preseason, new head coach Vic Fangio named Freeman the No. 2 running back on the depth chart behind Lindsay.

Freeman made his 2019 regular-season debut in the Broncos' season-opening 16–24 loss to the Raiders, recording 10 carries for 56 rushing yards. The following week against the Chicago Bears in a 16–14 loss, Freeman recorded 11 carries for 54 rushing yards and 5 receptions for 48 yards. In Week 3 against the Green Bay Packers in a 16–27 loss, Freeman recorded 15 carries for 63 rushing yards and four receptions for 10 yards. Despite splitting carries with Lindsay and starting the season on a strong note, Freeman struggled from Weeks 4–8 and received less of a role on offense in the second half of the season. He finished the 2019 season with 130 carries for 496 rushing yards and three rushing touchdowns to go along with 43 receptions for 256 receiving yards and one receiving touchdown.

==== 2020 season ====
With the addition of veteran running back Melvin Gordon, Freeman was pushed down to the No. 3 running back role. He finished the 2020 season with 35 carries for 170 rushing yards and 12 receptions for 81 receiving yards.

==== 2021 season ====
While Phillip Lindsay left in free agency to sign with the Houston Texans, the Broncos also signed Mike Boone in free agency and drafted Javonte Williams in the 2021 NFL draft. Freeman entered training camp competing for a roster spot as a backup. On September 1, 2021, Freeman was waived by the Broncos.

=== Carolina Panthers ===
On September 2, 2021, Freeman was claimed off waivers by the Carolina Panthers. He played in eight games before being released on November 8.

=== Houston Texans ===
On November 9, 2021, Freeman was claimed off waivers by the Texans. He finished the 2021 season with 56 carries for 169 rushing yards and ten receptions for 77 receiving yards.

Freeman re-signed with the Texans on March 25, 2022. On September 9, 2022, Freeman was released from the Texans and re-signed to the practice squad. He was promoted to the active roster on December 17. He played in the last four games of the 2022 season and made one start. He finished with 41 carries for 117 yards.

=== Los Angeles Rams (first stint) ===
On July 30, 2023, Freeman signed with the Los Angeles Rams. He was released on August 29, 2023, and re-signed to the practice squad. He was signed to the active roster on October 17, 2023. He appeared in 14 games. He finished with 77 carries for 319 yards and two touchdowns.

=== Dallas Cowboys ===
On April 16, 2024, Freeman signed a one-year deal with the Dallas Cowboys. He was released on August 27.

=== Cleveland Browns ===
On September 17, 2024, Freeman signed with the Cleveland Browns practice squad. He was released on October 8.

=== Chicago Bears ===
On December 11, 2024, the Chicago Bears signed Freeman to their practice squad.

=== Los Angeles Rams (second stint) ===
On January 7, 2025, Freeman signed with the Los Angeles Rams' practice squad.

=== Chicago Bears (second stint) ===
On August 20, 2025, Freeman signed with the Chicago Bears, but was released five days later.

=== Los Angeles Chargers ===
On December 1, 2025, Freeman signed with the Los Angeles Chargers' practice squad.

== Career statistics ==
Legend
| **Bold** | Career high |

=== NFL ===
| Year | Team | Games | | Rushing | | | | | Receiving | | | | | Fumbles | |
| Year | Team | GP | GS | Att | Yds | Avg | Lng | TD | Rec | Yds | Avg | Lng | TD | Fum | Lost |
|---|---|---|---|---|---|---|---|---|---|---|---|---|---|---|---|
| 2018 | DEN | 14 | 8 | 130 | **521** | 4.0 | 24 | **5** | 14 | 72 | 5.1 | 9 | 0 | **1** | **1** |
| 2019 | DEN | 16 | 0 | **132** | 496 | 3.8 | **28** | 3 | **43** | **256** | 6.0 | 19 | **1** | 0 | 0 |
| 2020 | DEN | 16 | 0 | 35 | 170 | **4.9** | 23 | 0 | 12 | 81 | 6.8 | **28** | 0 | 0 | 0 |
| 2021 | CAR | 8 | 0 | 21 | 77 | 3.7 | 13 | 0 | 3 | 15 | 5.0 | 8 | 0 | 0 | 0 |
| 2021 | HOU | 7 | 0 | 35 | 92 | 2.6 | 13 | 0 | 7 | 62 | **8.9** | 12 | 0 | 0 | 0 |
| 2022 | HOU | 4 | 1 | 41 | 117 | 2.9 | 11 | 0 | 6 | 33 | 5.5 | 9 | 0 | **1** | **1** |
| 2023 | LAR | 11 | 0 | 73 | 317 | 4.3 | 23 | 2 | 0 | 0 | 0 | 0 | 0 | 0 | 0 |
| Career | | 76 | 9 | 467 | 1,790 | 3.8 | 28 | 10 | 80 | 491 | 6.1 | 28 | 1 | 2 | 2 |

=== College ===
| Season | Team | GP | Rushing | | | | | Receiving | | | | |
| Season | Team | GP | Att | Yds | Avg | Lng | TD | Rec | Yds | Avg | Lng | TD |
|---|---|---|---|---|---|---|---|---|---|---|---|---|
| 2014 | Oregon | 15 | 252 | 1,365 | 5.4 | 38T | 18 | 16 | 158 | 9.9 | 30 | 1 |
| 2015 | Oregon | 13 | **283** | **1,836** | **6.5** | 64T | **17** | **26** | **348** | **12.0** | 33 | **2** |
| 2016 | Oregon | 11 | 168 | 945 | 5.6 | **85T** | 9 | 23 | 144 | 6.3 | 24 | 1 |
| 2017 | Oregon | 12 | 244 | 1,475 | 6.0 | 59 | 16 | 14 | 164 | 11.7 | **50** | 0 |
| Career | | 51 | 947 | 5,621 | 5.9 | 85T | 60 | 79 | 814 | 10.3 | 50 | 4 |

== Career highlights ==
=== Awards and honors ===
- Third-team All-American (2015)
- First-team All-Pac-12 (2015)
- 2× Second-team All-Pac-12 (2014, 2017)
- Pac-12 Offensive Freshman of the Year (2014)

=== Records ===
Pac-12 Conference

- Career Rushing Touchdowns, 60
- Career Rushing Yards, 5,621

Oregon

- Freshman Rushing Yards, 1,353
- Freshman Rushing Touchdowns, 19
- Career Rushing Yards, 5,621
- Career Rushing Touchdowns, 60

High school

- San Diego Section Career Rushing Yards, 7,606
- San Diego Section Career Rushing Touchdowns, 111
- San Diego Section Career Points Scored, 724

== See also ==
- NCAA Division I FBS rushing leaders
