= 2016 Cactus Bowl =

2016 Cactus Bowl can refer to:

- 2016 Cactus Bowl (January), played as part of the 2015–16 college football bowl season between the Arizona State Sun Devils and the West Virginia Mountaineers
- 2016 Cactus Bowl (December), played as part of the 2016–17 college football bowl season between the Baylor Bears and the Boise State Broncos
