= Olof Carl Malmquist =

American sculptor

- Born: October 26, 1894; Wallingford, Connecticut, U.S.
- Died: August 18, 1975 (aged 80); San Francisco, California, U.S.
- Education: Yale School of Fine Arts under Lee Lawrie; American Academy in Rome
- Alma mater: Yale School of Fine Arts
- Known for: Public sculpture

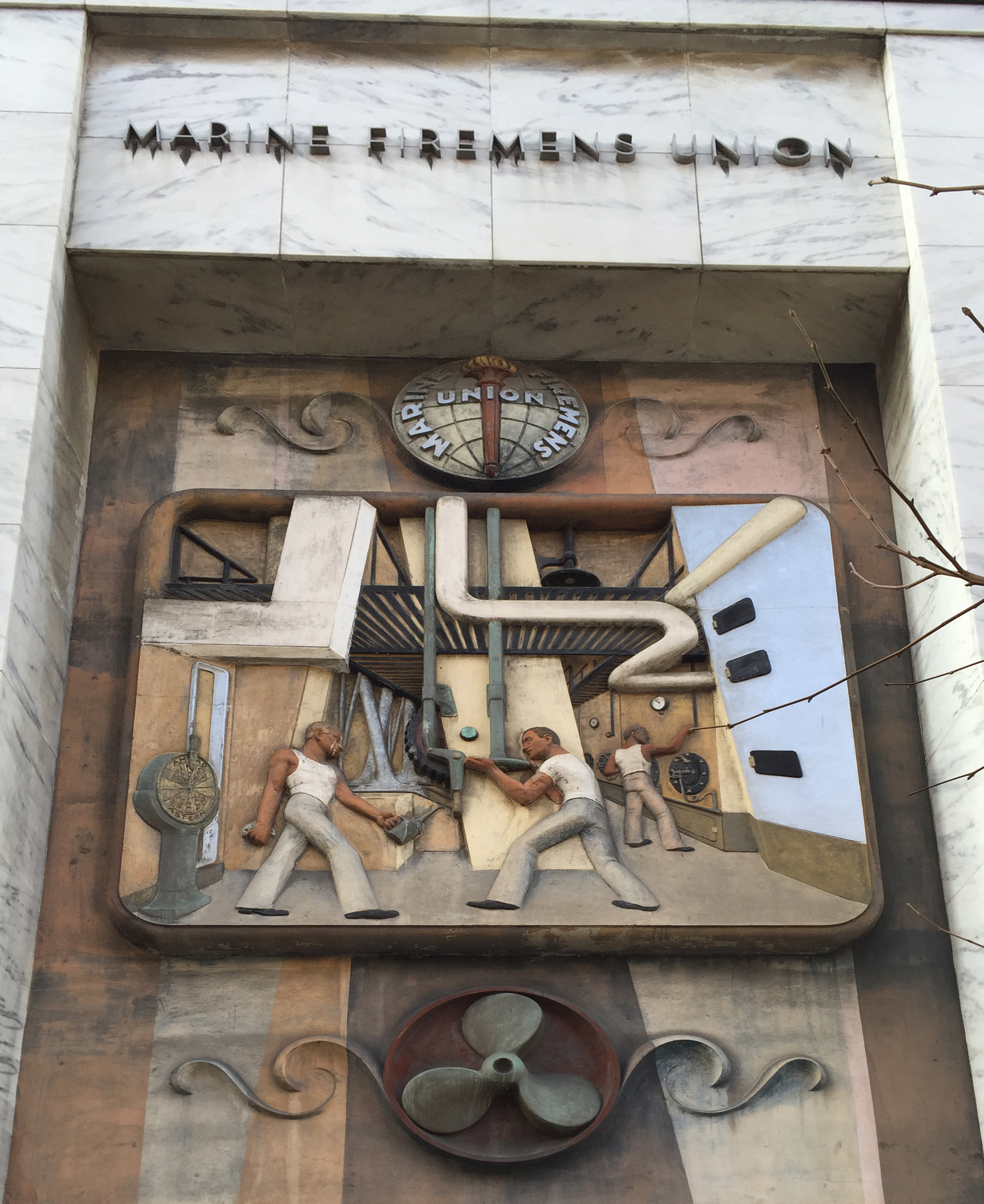
Bas-relief by Malmquist on the Marine Firemen's Union building in San Francisco

Olof Carl Malmquist (October 26, 1894 – August 18, 1975) was an American sculptor. He is best known for his public art in Northern California.

== Early life ==
Malmquist was born in Wallingford, Connecticut in 1894. He studied under Lee Lawrie at Yale University. He graduated from the Yale School of Fine Arts in 1916, received the Wirt Winchester Fellowship that year, and with the fellowship continued his studies at the American Academy in Rome.

== Career ==
He moved to San Francisco in 1922. His noted works in the region include the Marine Firemen's Union building in San Francisco, the San Bruno Public Library, the east entrance of the California State Capitol, and San Francisco's St. Gabriel Church. He contributed much to the sculpture on Treasure Island as part of the Golden Gate International Exposition in 1939.

== Death ==
Malmquist died on August 18, 1975, in San Francisco.
