= Sofia Hotel =

Historic hotel in San Diego, California, U.S.

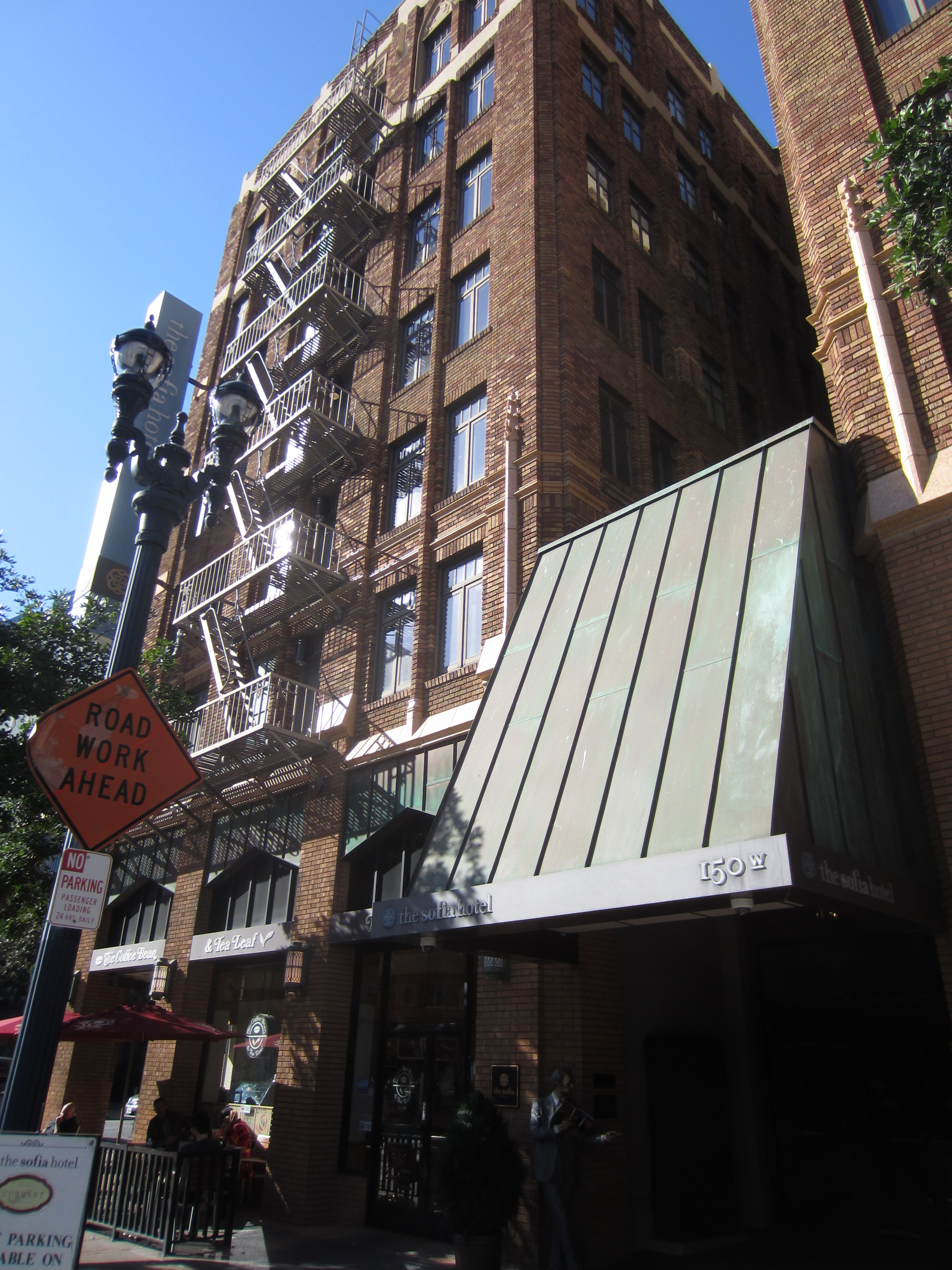

General information
- Type: Hotel
- Location: 150 W Broadway, 92101, San Diego, United States
- Coordinates: 32°42′57.5″N 117°9′51.5″W
- Opened: 1927

Website
- thesofiahotel.com

The Sofia Hotel, formerly the Pickwick Terminal Hotel, is a historic hotel in San Diego, in the U.S. state of California. Construction began in 1926. It opened in May 1927. The hotel was also inducted into Historic Hotels of America, the official program of the National Trust for Historic Preservation, in 2008.

There has been at least one death in this hotel; a WWI veteran, William Frederick "Bill" Foote died by suicide on April 7, 1928 in a room of this hotel, then known as Pickwick.
