= Michael Foster (American writer) =

American journalist

Michael Foster (1904–1956) was an American novelist, journalist, screenwriter and cartoonist.

== Personal ==
Foster was born August 29, 1904, in Hardy, Arkansas, the son of Mr. and Mrs. Carl D. Foster. His nickname was "Gully."

He was a graduate of the University of Washington and the Chicago Art Institute.

Foster married his literary agent, novelist Jane Hardy of New York. Their children were Peter Michael Foster and Garrett Ann Foster of San Francisco.

Foster died of a stroke on March 25, 1956, in Reno, Nevada.

== Career ==
Foster began his journalism career with the Brooklyn Eagle. He was a reporter and cartoonist for newspapers in Salina, Kansas; Los Angeles, California, and, by 1937, Seattle, Washington.

In 1926, he was working on the Los Angeles Express, a daily newspaper. A friend, Charles Harris Garrigues, wrote that Foster

writes, paints, and has been called the second most promising of the young poets in America by the Lit Dig [Literary Digest] — doesn't know one note of music from another and improvises the most beautiful piano music ... He roomed down at the house for a while until we had a fight over a novel he's writing and then he moved out — went on a three weeks' drunk and only started back to work when I threatened to knock his block off if he didn't.

He also worked on the Seattle Post-Intelligencer until 1952, when he resigned to devote all his time to writing fiction.

Foster's first novel, Forgive Adam, was published in 1935 by W. Morrow and Co. Margaret Wallace of the New York Times said of the author:

Michael Foster, a young newspaper man on the Pacific Coast, is the newest recruit to the ranks of the hard-boiled novelists. In the brief declarative sentences of his prose style, in his method of consistent understatement, in his attitude of weary and rather self-conscious disillusionment, he has aligned himself with the school of Hemingway and his imitators.

The second novel, American Dream, came in 1937. American Dream told the story of "a disillusioned newspaperman who discovers through old family letters what America meant to the writers and what America should mean to him. Several scenes are reminiscent of the tawdry political atmosphere rendered in Ben Hecht's and Charles MacArthur's 1928 play, The Front Page.".

Los Angeles Times reviewer Milton Merlin said that the work was:

not an entirely satisfying novel, but it is an ambitious enterprise and an exceptionally compelling story told with feeling and facility. . . . Foster, a Seattle reporter, chooses a member of his profession for his central figure. Shelby Thrall, a disillusioned idealist at 30, reviews three generations of Thralls in an attempt to recapture the meaning of the "American Dream." Shelby's recollections, stirred by a pile of old, crumbling letters in the attic, cover a span of three generations . . . .

Two books followed — To Remember at Midnight (1938) and House Above the River (1946).

About his final book, The Dusty Godmother (1949), reviewer A.C. Spectorsky wrote in the New York Times that Foster had

expanded a slick-magazine short story into a light novel which disappoints largely because it has frequent and unfulfilled intimations and overtones of being far more than just that.

Garrigues wrote in 1957 after Foster's death that when Foster "had done penance to his father by The American Dream, he had done all he had to do. . . . he had written himself out when he made peace with his father, who was dead; after that, he drank himself to death trying to find something that was not in him."

== Filmography ==
- Fireside Theatre, "Second Elopement," story, 1954
- Hallmark Hall of Fame, "The Big Build Up", story, 1952
- Studio One in Hollywood, "The Dusty Godmother," story, 1950
- Collaborated with Winston Miller on the writing of Titanic for Selznick International.
