= King-Ramsay-Conner case =

Merchant seamen convicted of murdering a ship's officer

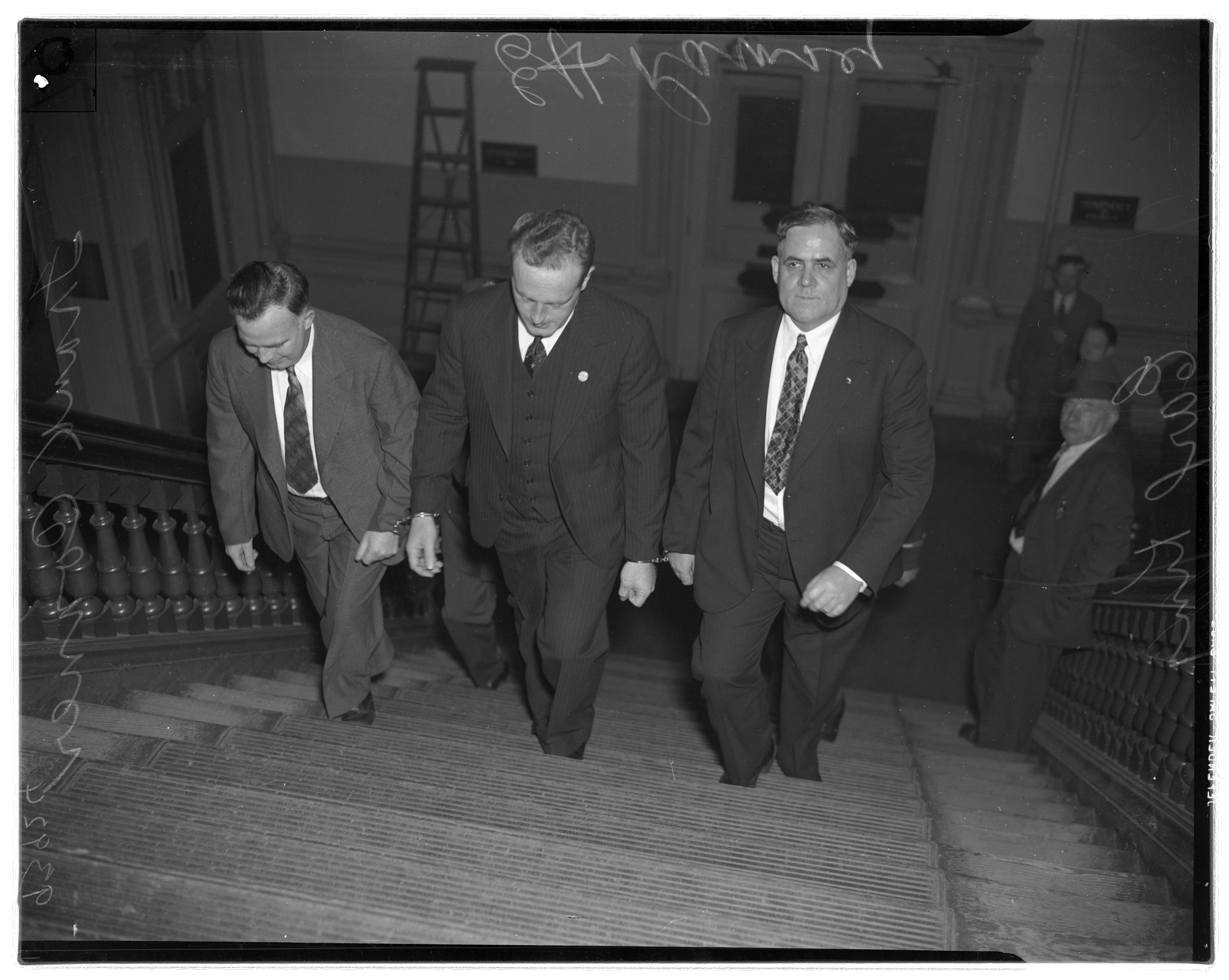
Earl King, Ernest Ramsay, and Frank Conner walking up the courtroom steps

Earl King, Ernest Ramsay, and Frank Conner were three merchant seamen convicted of murdering a ship's officer, George Alberts, aboard a freighter anchored in Alameda, California, on March 22, 1936.

Their trial, appeals, and terms in San Quentin Prison made up a widely reported case that caught the attention of trade unionists, progressives, and radicals. The prosecution was led by Alameda County District Attorney Earl Warren, who would go on to become the Attorney General and Governor of California, and later the Chief Justice of the United States. The sentences of the three men were later commuted to time served by California Governor Culbert Olson, and Warren himself later granted one of the convicted men a full pardon when he was ending his time as governor to join the U.S. Supreme Court as its Chief Justice.

== Background ==
All three men involved in the trial were involved in the Marine Firemen's Union, a maritime workers union based in San Francisco. Earl King was the secretary of the Marine Firemen's Union, Ernest Ramsay was an organizer for the union, and Frank Conner was the engine-room union delegate aboard the steamship Point Lobos, which was berthed in Alameda, while on a trip for Swayne & Hoyt's Pacific to Gulf Coast shipping lane and had crossed the Panama Canal on March 7, heading for Seattle, Washington.

On March 22, 1936, George Alberts, the Chief Engineer on the SS Point Lobos, was found stabbed to death in his cabin. No-one was immediately arrested following the discovery of his body, and the case remained cold for months. After five months of investigation from the Alameda County district attorney's office, four arrests and five indictments were made in the case. On August 27, 1936, George Wallace, was arrested in Brownsville, Texas. On the same day, Earl King and Ernest Ramsay were arrested in San Francisco. Frank Conner was arrested a few days later in Seattle.

Union activists accused the prosecution of engaging in an anti-union plot, alleging prejudice by the judge and other irregularities. At the time, the union was entering negotiations for a new contract, where Earl King was to play a key part at the bargaining table.

== Trial ==
The three were not aboard the ship when the crime was committed. The actual assault was laid to a seaman named Ben "Wimpy" Sackowitiz, who was never apprehended. Another sailor, George Wallace, admitted being aboard the ship with Sakovitz. Wallace admitted taking part in the crime and testified that Conner, who remained on the dock, had given a signal to begin the killing. Conner also confessed but he later attempted to repudiate the confession. The prosecution accused Ramsay and King of planning the crime.

== Aftermath ==
Immediately after their conviction, union and leftist political activists condemned the courts and the prosecution. The Communist Party of the United States published an editorial in their publication Western Worker that the voice of the jury was that of "shipowners and of the District Attorney Earl Warren", and that "Trade unions and other progressive organizations should pass resolutions condemning the frame-up". Later, the same paper published that a group of men from the International Labor Defense, visited Earl King and Ernest Ramsey, while they were imprisoned in San Quentin. The paper went on to encourage other union members to visit the men, to update them on union activities and life outside of the prison. Governor Culbert Olson commuted the sentences of the trio to time served, and in 1953 Warren, who was then the outgoing governor of California, granted Ramsay a full pardon just hours before he left for Washington to take up his new duties as Chief Justice of the United States.

== See also ==
- C.H. Garrigues, defense investigator
