= Toni Strassman =

Toni Strassman (1895–1984) was an authors' representative based in New York City. Her clients included Charles Harris (Brick) Garrigues, John and Martha Clayton, William Goyen, Harry Mark Petrakis and Friderike Zweig, the first wife of Stefan Zweig.

She was born as Fanny Strassman on October 28, 1895. Of delicate health as a young woman, she spent most of 1926 and 1927 in Arizona, Colorado and New Mexico before returning to New York. At that time she wanted to be a dancer or actress, and in 1929 she was an understudy with the Provincetown Players in Greenwich Village, but the group disbanded before her show was mounted.

Strassman then worked for Viking Press; she changed her name to Toni in 1936, shortly before she became a full-time literary agent. She died in New York City on April 15, 1988.

Her papers, which include correspondence, memoranda, contracts, royalty statements, manuscripts, diaries, daybooks and photographs, are in the Rare Book & Manuscript Library at Columbia University.
