= John Bell Clayton and Martha Clayton =

Deceased American husband and wife, known for short story writing

John Bell Clayton
- Born: John Bell Clayton II; October 28, 1906; Craigsville, Virginia, U.S.
- Died: February 10, 1955 (aged 48); Laguna Beach, California, U.S.
- Occupation: Writer
- Spouse: Martha Clayton

Martha Clayton
- Born: Martha Carmichael; 1919; India,
- Died: 1961 (aged 45–46); Beverly Hills, California, U.S.
- Known for: Posthumously posting her husband's works
- Spouse: John Bell Clayton

John Bell Clayton II (October 28, 1906 – February 10, 1955) was a "prolific writer of short stories" who won an O. Henry Short Story Award in 1947. His wife, Martha Carmichael Clayton (c. 1915–1961), oversaw the posthumous publication of her husband's works; she was a sister of songwriter Hoagy Carmichael.

== John Bell Clayton ==
John Clayton was born in Craigsville, Virginia, and was graduated from the University of Virginia before becoming a journalist. In 1938, he had a film credit as the writer on a comedy, The Old Raid Mule.

In the 1940s he ran a lending library in San Francisco and was employed from time to time as a temporary editor on the San Francisco Examiner.

In 1947 he won the O. Henry Short Story Award for The White Circle, originally in Harpers magazine. Ten years later, the story was made into a teleplay for the television series Rendezvous.

His novels, published by Macmillan, were Six Angels at My Back (1952), Wait, Son, October Is Near (1953) and Walk Toward the Rainbow (1954).

According to his friend, Charles Harris (Brick) Garrigues, the Claytons moved from San Francisco to Laguna Beach, where, on Feb. 10, 1955, John Clayton died of a viral infection. John had told his wife when he went into the hospital, "Marthie, if the next ten years are going to be like the last one, I don't think I want to come back."

He was survived by his wife and son, John Bell Clayton III, a West Point cadet, and a sister, Mrs. Mary Bartley of Deerfield, Virginia.

== Martha Carmichael Clayton ==
Martha Clayton was born as Martha Carmichael in Indiana. Her father was Howard, nicknamed "Cyclone," who owned a livery and was an electrician. Her mother, Lida Mary, was a pianist in local movie and vaudeville houses. Besides her brother, Hoagland, Martha had two other siblings — Joanne, who died in childhood, and Georgia.

In 1957, she oversaw the publication of her husband's posthumous book of short stories, The Strangers Were There: Selected Stories (1957). The deal was placed with Macmillan by the Claytons' agent, Toni Strassman.

Of the book, Richard Sullivan wrote in the Chicago Sunday Tribune that John Clayton was "a writer of high, bright excellence."

Martha's body was found on August 6, 1961, by her sister, Georgia, in the Beverly Hills house that their brother had bought for them. Alcohol and a sleeping pill were blamed for her death. Hoagy recalled in his autobiography, Sometimes I Wonder (Farrar, Straus, 1965), that after John Clayton's death Martha "gathered up his papers and manuscript and made another book for him, and then one night while still young and healthy, she quietly let go."
