= 2016 Cactus Bowl (January) =

2016 Motel 6 Cactus Bowl
- 27th Cactus Bowl
West Virginia Mountaineers	Arizona State Sun Devils
(7–5)	(6–6)
Big 12	Pac-12
43	42
Head coach: Dana Holgorsen	Head coach: Todd Graham
	1	2	3	4	Total
West Virginia	9	13	14	7	43
Arizona State	3	15	14	10	42
- Date: January 2, 2016
- Season: 2015
- Stadium: Chase Field
- Location: Phoenix, Arizona
- MVP: Skyler Howard (QB, West Virginia) Offense; Shaq Petteway (LB, West Virginia) Defense
- Favorite: Arizona State by 1
- Referee: Jeff Servinski (Big Ten)
- Attendance: 39,321
- Payout: US$TBD

United States TV coverage
- Network: ESPN/ESPN Radio
- Announcers: Dave Neal, Matt Stinchcomb, & Kayce Smith (ESPN); Drew Goodman, David Diaz-Infante, & Olivia Harlan (ESPN Radio)

The 2016 Cactus Bowl was a post-season American college football bowl game played on January 2, 2016 at Chase Field in Phoenix, Arizona. This was the twenty-seventh edition of the Cactus Bowl, although only the second played under that name. Sponsored by the Motel 6 chain of budget motels, the game was officially known as the Motel 6 Cactus Bowl.

The bowl featured the West Virginia Mountaineers of the Big 12 Conference against the Arizona State Sun Devils of the Pac-12 Conference, and was the concluding game of the season for both teams. It began at 8:15 p.m. MST and aired on ESPN. It was one of the 2015–16 bowl games that concluded the 2015 FBS football season and was the final bowl game prior to the 2016 College Football Playoff National Championship game.

Motel 6 took over as title sponsor of the game replacing TicketCity, who had served as sponsor of the previous year's game.

The 2016 Cactus Bowl marked the game's return to Chase Field, its home from 2000 until 2005, after a ten-year absence during which the game was played at Sun Devil Stadium in Tempe, Arizona. The move was made due to a reconstruction project at Sun Devil Stadium that rendered the facility unusable during the college football offseason and would see Chase Field host the Cactus Bowl through 2018. West Virginia won the game by a final score of 43-42.

== Teams ==
The game featured the West Virginia Mountaineers against the Arizona State Sun Devils.

=== Arizona State Sun Devils ===
After finishing their season 6–6, the Sun Devils accepted their invitation to play in the game.

This was also the Sun Devils' second Cactus Bowl; they had previously won the 2005 Insight Bowl over Rutgers 45–40.

=== West Virginia Mountaineers ===
After finishing their season 7–5, the Mountaineers accepted their invitation to play in the game.

This was the Mountaineers' second Cactus Bowl; they had previously lost the 1998 Insight.com Bowl to Missouri 34–31.

== Game summary ==
=== Scoring summary ===
Scoring summary

Quarter	Time	Drive			Team	Scoring information	Score	
Quarter	Time	Plays	Yards	TOP	Team	Scoring information	WVU	ASU
1	12:02	9	71	2:58	WVU	21-yard field goal by Josh Lambert	3	0
1	8:57	8	56	2:25	WVU	31-yard field goal by Josh Lambert	6	0
1	5:06	4	2	1:30	ASU	37-yard field goal by Zane Gonzalez	6	3
1	3:13	6	55	1:53	WVU	27-yard field goal by Josh Lambert	9	3
2	9:59	4	40	1:06	ASU	Devin Lucien 19-yard touchdown reception from Mike Bercovici, Zane Gonzalez kick good	9	10
2	6:02	3	80	0:39	WVU	Shelton Gibson 59-yard touchdown reception from Skyler Howard, Josh Lambert kick good	16	10
2	2:53	10	80	3:00	ASU	19-yard field goal by Zane Gonzalez	16	13
2	0:28	8	75	2:25	WVU	Daikiel Shorts 10-yard touchdown reception from Skyler Howard, Josh Lambert kick blocked	22	13
2	0:28	—	—	—	ASU	Tim White returns blocked PAT for 2-point conversion	22	15
2	0:01	4	34	0:26	ASU	35-yard field goal by Zane Gonzalez	22	18
3	11:34	8	66	3:17	ASU	Tim White 2-yard touchdown reception from Mike Bercovici, Zane Gonzalez kick good	22	25
3	10:02	5	75	1:32	WVU	Gary Jennings 64-yard touchdown reception from Skyler Howard, Josh Lambert kick good	29	25
3	4:35	6	66	2:26	ASU	Tim White 33-yard touchdown reception from Mike Bercovici, Zane Gonzalez kick good	29	32
3	3:01	4	75	1:34	WVU	Daikiel Shorts 17-yard touchdown reception from Skyler Howard, Josh Lambert kick good	36	32
4	14:09	4	5	1:09	ASU	48-yard field goal by Zane Gonzalez	36	35
4	4:56	4	73	1:23	ASU	Gary Chambers 58-yard touchdown reception from Mike Bercovici, Zane Gonzalez kick good	36	42
4	2:19	10	75	2:37	WVU	David Sills 15-yard touchdown reception from Skyler Howard, Josh Lambert kick good	43	42
"TOP" = time of possession. For other American football terms, see Glossary of American football.							43	42

=== Statistics ===
Statistics	WVU	ASU
First downs	29	23
Total offense, plays – yards	84–676	84–520
Rushes-yards (net)	33–144	32–102
Passing yards (net)	532	418
Passes, Comp-Att-Int	28–51–2	29–52–0
Time of Possession	29:02	30:58
