= Marine Firemen's Union =

American mariner group

- Pacific Coast Marine Firemen, Oilers, Watertenders and Wipers Association
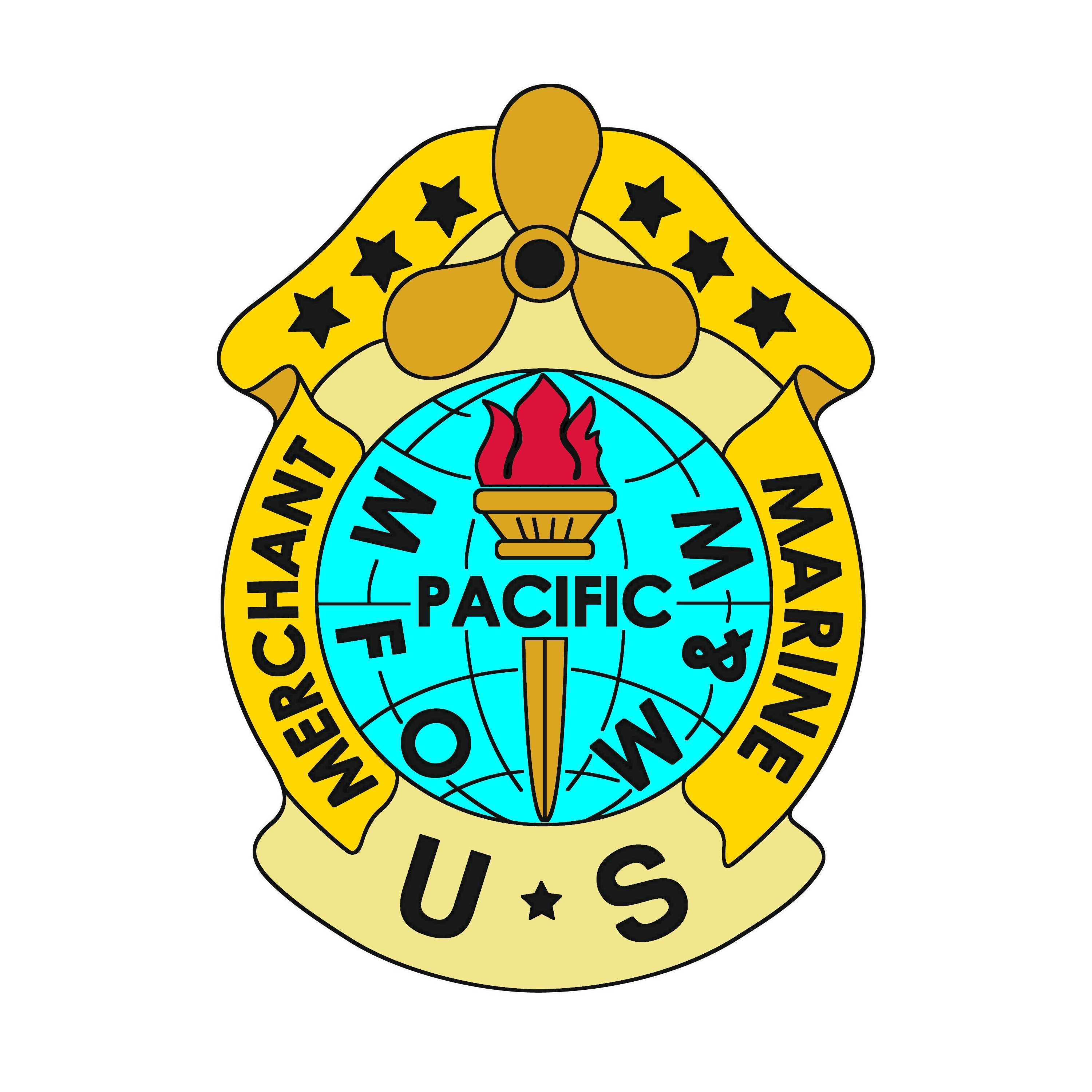
- Founded: October 1883
- Headquarters: San Francisco, CA
- Location: United States
- Members: 516 (2023)
- Key people: Anthony Poplawski, President
- Affiliations: Seafarers International Union of North America AFL–CIO
- Website: www.mfoww.org

The Pacific Coast Marine Firemen, Oilers, Watertenders and Wipers Association (MFOW), commonly referred to as the Marine Firemen's Union, is an American labor union of mariners working aboard U.S. flag vessels. The Marine Firemen's Union is an affiliate union of the Seafarers International Union of North America AFL–CIO.

The union was formed in San Francisco, California in October, 1883, by "firemen on coal-burning steamers."

== Strikes ==
In June 1886, the union led a strike against the Oceanic Steamship Company.

In 1901, the union participated in a San Francisco strike of over 20,000 men to oppose an open shop initiative by employers.

On May 1, 1906, the union participated in a successful strike for better wages and working conditions. The strike lasted until November 1906.

In 1921, faced with threats including a 15 percent reduction in wages, loss of overtime pay, a reduction from three to two watches, the union joined a national strike. The strike was unsuccessful, and by the end of the year unlicensed American mariners were being replaced by subsistence-wage foreign crews.

On May 16, 1934, the union joined the West Coast longshoremen's strike of 1934. Lasting 83 days, it led to the unionization of all of the West Coast ports of the United States. The San Francisco general strike, along with the 1934 Toledo Auto-Lite Strike led by the American Workers Party and the Minneapolis Teamsters Strike of 1934, were important catalysts for the rise of industrial unionism in the 1930s.

West Coast sailors walked off their ships in support of the International Longshoremen's Association longshoremen, leaving more than 50 ships idle in the San Francisco harbor. In clashes with the police between July 3 and July 5, 1934, three picketers were killed and "scores were injured." During negotiations to end the strike, the sailors received concessions such a three-watch system, pay increases, and better living conditions.

In 1936, all the Pacific Maritime Federation unions banded together to strike for wages, working conditions, and a union-controlled hiring hall. The strike was successful.

The union participated in a 1948 West Coast strike that included the longshoremen. The strike lasted for four months with neither side clearly victorious.

On March 16, 1962, the union called a strike and on April 11, 1962, under the Taft–Hartley Act, a federal injunction was issued to stop the strike. After lengthy court battles, an agreement was reached, with the union gaining numerous concessions, including "overtime in port, pension benefits, wages, vacation, and welfare benefits."

== Building in San Francisco ==
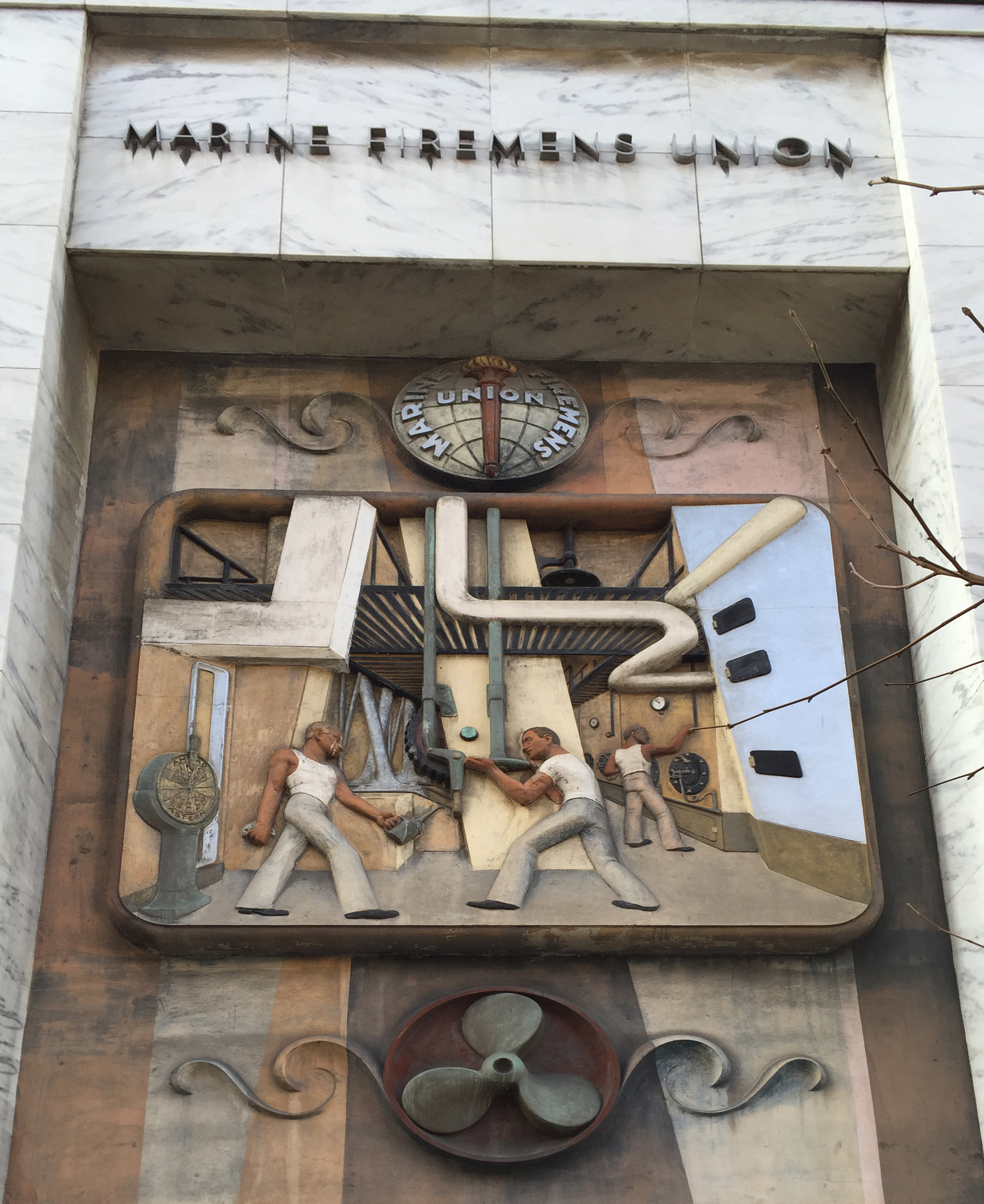
Bas-relief by Olof Carl Malmquist on the Marine Firemen's Union building.

The building currently housing the union, built in 1957, is located at 240 2nd St. in San Francisco, California. The bas-relief sculpture on the front was made by Olof Carl Malmquist, a sculptor who contributed to the Golden Gate International Exposition.

== See also ==
- Maritime Trades Department, AFL–CIO
- National Maritime Union
- United States Merchant Marine
- Earl King, Ernest Ramsay, and Frank Conner murder case
