= Rena Vale =

American screenwriter

Rena Vale at work in 1932, with Wycliffe A. Hill Los Angeles Times photo

Rena Vale, or Rena M. Vale, (1898–1983) was a writer who was a scriptwriter for Universal Studios in Hollywood from 1926 to 1930 and in the 1930s was an investigator for a U.S. House of Representatives committee that later became the House Committee on Un-American Activities.

== Early life ==
Vale was born as Rena Marie Vale in Arizona on January 30, 1898, and graduated from Northern Arizona Normal School in Flagstaff in 1918. She taught school in Arizona for two years and was also a cowgirl in that state. She moved to California in 1920, where she was also a ballroom dancer in Long Beach, California. She worked at the Board of Education and then as a shop assistant, selling men's hosiery.

== Screenwriter ==
In 1916, at age 18, she sold a screenplay to the Lubin Manufacturing Company, for which she received $25. Twelve years later, in March 1928, she was announced as the winner of a national contest sponsored by Photoplay magazine and Paramount Pictures for her scenario for a movie called Swag. She won from 40,000 entries and received a first prize of $5,000.

In 1929, Vale was director of publicity for Pickwick Airways and for several years after was an aviation writer. In November 1932, she was secretary to Wycliffe A. Hill, who was engaged in an endeavor to develop a "robot" process that would help put jokes together from a series of standard formats.

By May 1934, Vale was working as assistant to the screenwriter George Yohalem, hoping to sell some of her own work, but in those days a stenographer could not "even attempt to sell her own stuff without being blacklisted, but she has a chance to sell stuff under other names". She worked for other writers as well, but by 1936 she was unemployed and registered with the California State Emergency Relief Administration.

== In and out of the Communist Party ==
In December 1936, she was put on the payroll of the Works Progress Administration as secretary to R. Frederick Sparks, supervisor of the WPA Historical Records Survey. It was during the period that she became a member of the Communist Party, under the pseudonym Irene Wood, and held various positions and attended various meetings of the party

In August 1937, "in accordance with Communist Party decision, upon which I acted", Vale requested and received transfer to the Federal Theater Project of the WPA and, with others, worked on a play titled Sun Rises in the West, about migratory workers, which was later produced at the Mayan Theater in downtown Los Angeles and the Greek Theater in the Hollywood Hills. In March 1938, she transferred to the Federal Writers' Project, where she was editorial assistant to Robert Brownell, who was in charge of the history essay for the Los Angeles Guide. Vale said she mailed back her party book in resignation in mid-1938, and in October of that year she learned she was expelled from the party. Shortly thereafter, she said, she was fired as editorial assistant and her salary was reduced.

In October 1941, she was secretary for the California State Assembly Committee on Un-American Activities. In November 1942, she filed a lengthy affidavit with the Joint Fact-Finding Committee to the 55th California Legislature detailing her experiences as a member of the Communist Party and giving the names of those she said worked with her, implicating the comedian Lucille Ball, the writer-activist Carey McWilliams, the actress Gale Sondergaard, the author John Steinbeck and the journalist Charles Harris Garrigues, among others. She also worked for Sen. Joseph McCarthy's permanent subcommittee on investigations.

== Science fiction ==
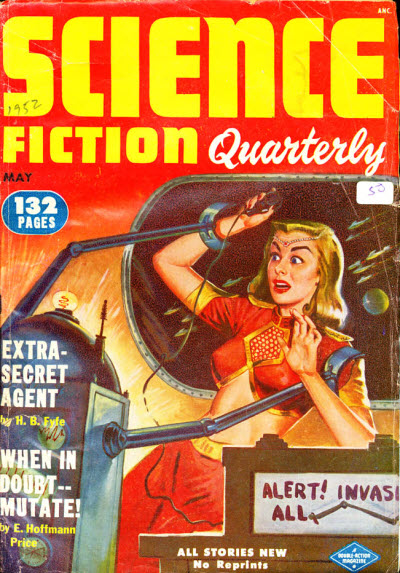
Vale's novella "The Shining City" was the cover story on the May 1952 issue of Science Fiction Quarterly

Later, she became a science-fiction writer:

- Beyond the Sealed World
- Taurus Four
- The Day After Doomsday
- The House on Rainbow Leap
- "The Shining City Medford, Oregon : Armchair Fiction, 2012 OCLC 922733629

== Works ==
- Rena Vale, "Stalin Over California", Los Angeles Times, March 29, 1940, page A-4 (reprinted, in part, from the American Mercury magazine)
- Rena M. Vale, The Red Court, last seat of national government of the United States of America : the story of the revolution to come through communism Detroit : Nelson, 1952. OCLC 3112750
- Rena M. Vale, Against the Red Tide, Los Angeles: Standard Publications (1953), 96 pp.

== Death ==
She died in February 1983 in Tucson, Arizona.
