= The Pickwick Corporation =

California corporation

The Pickwick Corporation was a California corporation that historically encompassed a number of related businesses, including the surviving Pickwick Hotel in San Francisco, California.

== History ==
Prior firms, merged to the Pickwick Corporation, had used the Pickwick Theatre as their departure point. The company was named for its office location, the 1904 San Diego Pickwick Theater, and was built by Louis J. Wilde. Its primary use was for vaudeville, but it converted to movies in 1922. Four years later, it was demolished.

== Constituent companies ==
=== Pickwick Stage Lines ===
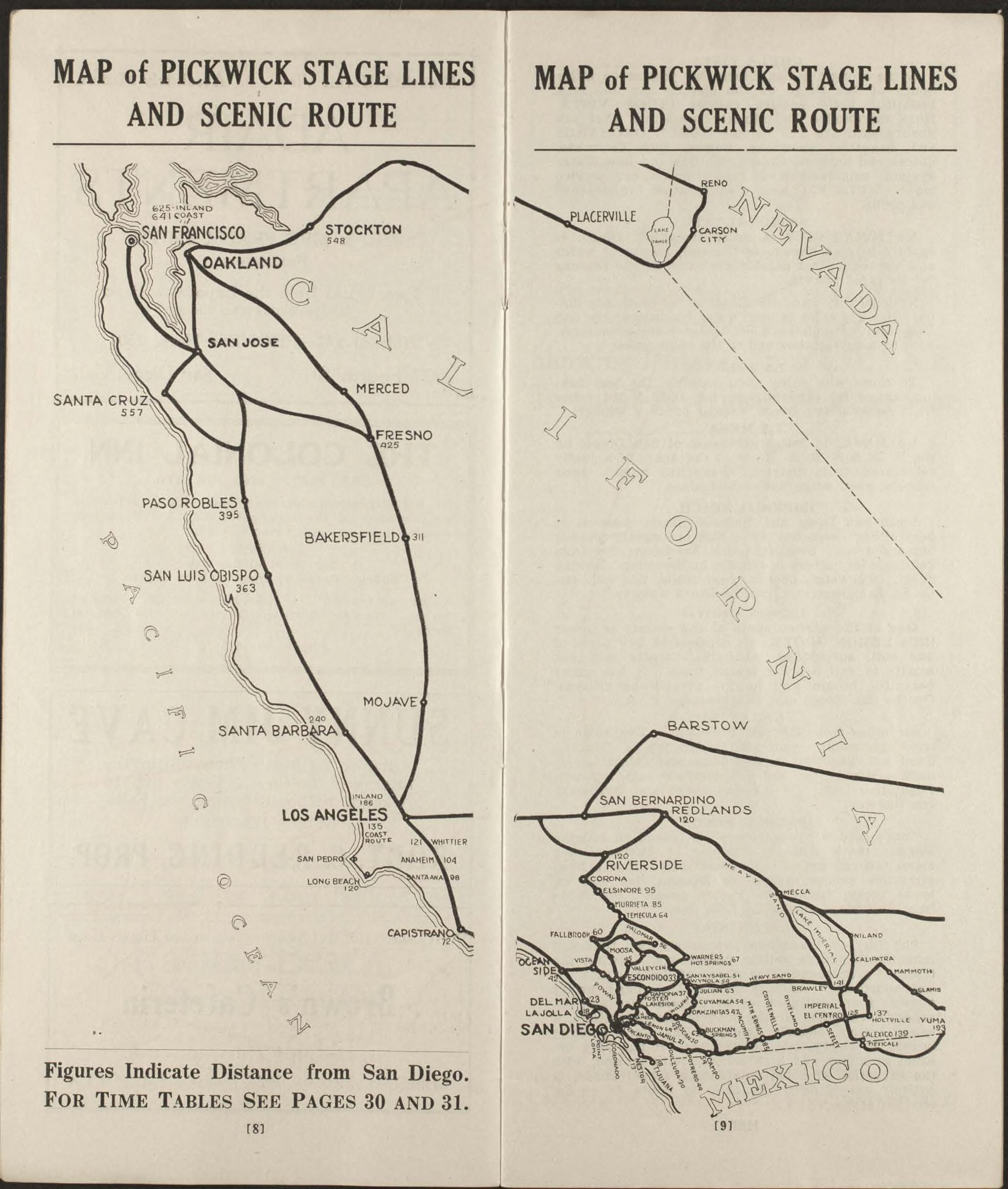
Map of Pickwick Stage Lines, 1915

The Pickwick Stage Lines was one of the major bus companies incorporated into the Greyhound system in its formative years. Pickwick merged with Minnesota-based Northland Transportation in 1929. The newly formed company was named Pickwick Greyhound.

=== Pickwick Motor Coach Works ===
Manufacturer of buses, including a unique sleeper coach called the "Nite Coach". Pickwick's coach factory was located in El Segundo, along what is now Aviation Blvd. just south of Imperial Blvd./Highway. In 1934, this factory was acquired by the Northrup Division of the Douglas Aircraft Co., re-named the El Segundo Division of Douglas Aircraft after John Northrup left the Douglas Co. in 1937. The building remained in use through World War II.

=== Pickwick Airways ===
Pickwick Airways operated a fleet of Bach 3-CT-6 "air yachts", initially between San Diego and Los Angeles, subsequently between San Francisco and Los Angeles, with service eventually extending as far as Mexico City. In 1929, Rena Vale was director of publicity. Gilpin Airlines emerged from the Depression-related failure of Pickwick Airways.

=== Pickwick Broadcasting ===
Pickwick Broadcasting was a network of radio stations in California, including KTAB in San Francisco (now KZAC), KNRC in Los Angeles, KTM (became KEHE, now KABC (AM)) in Santa Monica, and KGB (now KLSD) in San Diego.

=== Pickwick Hotels ===
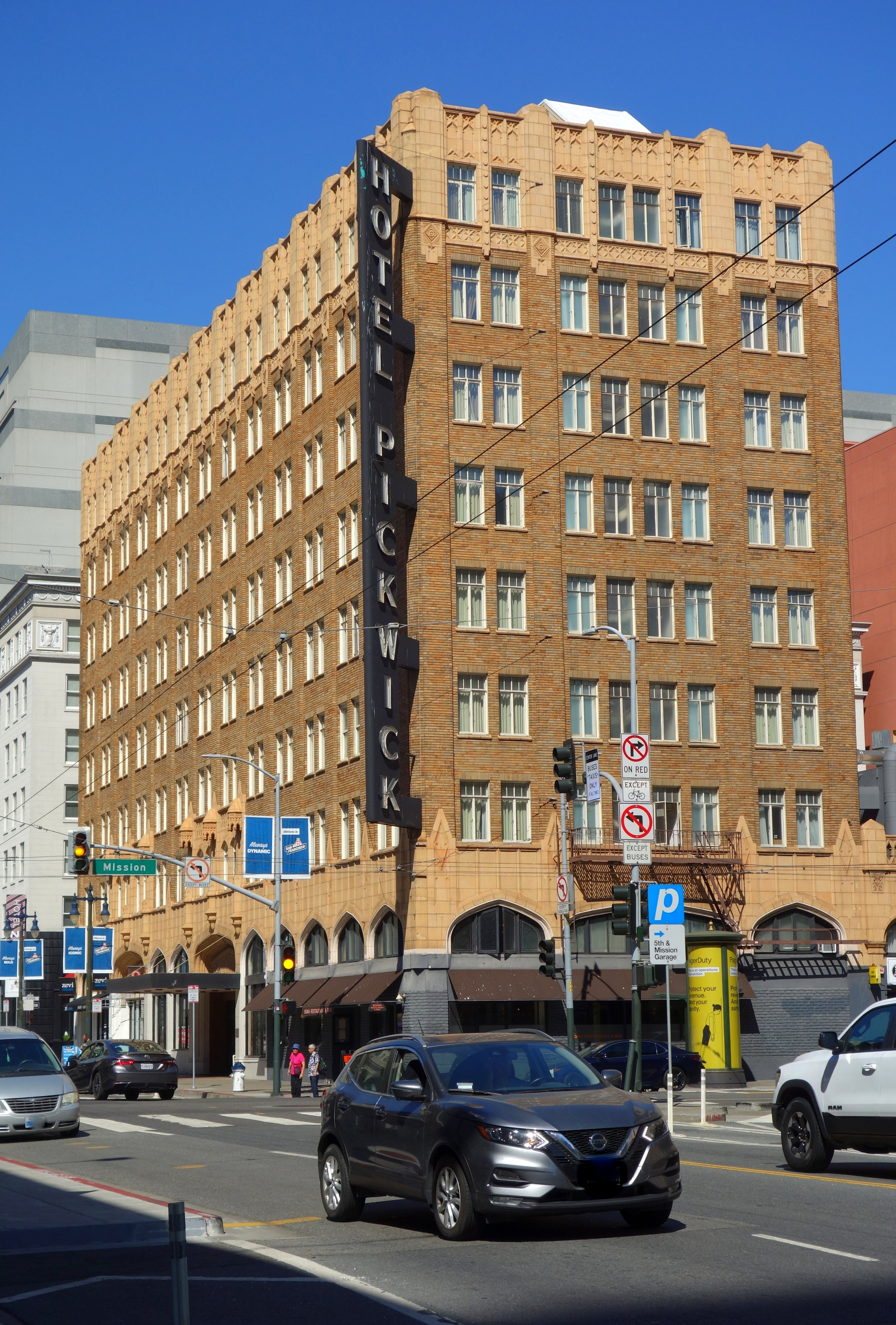
Hotel Pickwick, San Francisco

In 1926, a Pickwick Hotel, was built by the company itself, and located in Anaheim at 225 South Los Angeles (later Anaheim) Blvd. It was initially named the El Torre but was re-named Pickwick in 1929. It suffered some damage in the 1933 Long Beach earthquake, but was repaired. It continued in use under new owners until it was demolished in 1988.

In 1927, the Pickwick Terminal Hotel, opened in San Diego. It was restored and re-named The Sofia Hotel in 2006.

On 22 September 1928, the Pickwick Hotel in San Francisco opened at Fifth and Mission near Union Square. The same building was utilized by the Pickwick Stage Lines as its San Francisco terminal. It was mentioned in the Dashiell Hammett mystery novel “The Maltese Falcon”. The hotel survives under different owners today.

In 1930, a large Pickwick Hotel and bus terminal was built by the company and opened in Kansas City. It was restored in 2015 and re-opened as "East 9 at Pickwick Plaza" in 2016.

In 1930, Pickwick opened another hotel in Salt Lake City.

The Pickwick Hotel in Los Angeles was located at 833 South Grand, adjacent to the Trinity Auditorium Building. The site of the hotel is now a modern parking garage with the address 801 South Grand.
