= Kayce Smith =

American podcaster and reporter (born 1988)

Personal information
- Born: October 25, 1988 (age 37) Arlington, Texas, U.S
- Education: Texas A&M University
- Occupation: Sports reporter
- Years active: 2014–present
- Employer: Barstool Sports
- Children: 1

Kayce Smith (born October 25, 1988) is an American Podcast host for Barstool Sports and formerly a sports reporter with ESPN, Fox Sports, and NBC Sports.

== Early life and education ==
Kayce Smith was born on October 25, 1988 and raised in Arlington, Texas and graduated from Texas A&M University in 2012. While at Texas A&M, Smith would often report on college football star, Johnny Manziel, who was a star football player while she went to school there.

== Media career ==
In 2014, Kayce Smith began working as a sideline reporter for Fox Sports South and the Atlanta Hawks. Soon after, Smith left Fox Sports for ESPN where she worked for the SEC Network and ESPNU where she covered college football, basketball, and gymnastics.

Kayce Smith started working at NBC Sports Boston in March 2017, hosting the Boston Sports Tonight talk show with Tom Curran, Michael Holley, and Tom Giles. Smith left NBC Sports Boston in 2018 to work for Barstool Sports. Smith initially started a podcast with Johnny Manziel at Barstool, the Comeback SZN Podcast whom she knew from her time at Texas A&M University. At Barstool, Kayce Smith is currently the host of the Barstool College Football Show with Dave Portnoy, Dan Katz, and Brandon Walker. In 2025, the Barstool College Football Show began serving as a pre-show on Fox Sports 1 to Big Noon Kickoff. She is the host of the Pro Football Show with Dan Katz, Jon Gruden, and Fred Smoot. Kayce used to be the host of the podcast, Unnecessary Roughness with Brandon Walker and T-Bob Hebert.
