= Imperial Unified School District =

School district in California, United States

Location
- 219 North E St. Imperial, California 92251 United States

Other information
- Website: do.imperialusd.org

Imperial Unified School District is a public school district based in Imperial County, California, United States. It serves the city of Imperial and the unincorporated communities of Boulder Park, Coyote Wells, Dixieland, and Ocotillo.

== Schools ==
=== Elementary ===
- Ben Hulse Elementary School
- T.L. Waggoner Elementary
- Imperial Cross Elementary

=== Secondary ===
- Frank M. Wright Middle School
- Imperial High School
- Imperial Ave. Holbrook Adult School
