= Politics of San Diego County =

United States presidential election results for San Diego County, California
Year	Republican		Democratic		Third party(ies)	
Year	No.	%	No.	%	No.	%
1880	743	56.80%	546	41.74%	19	1.45%
1884	1,120	57.00%	800	40.71%	45	2.29%
1888	4,661	56.88%	3,189	38.92%	344	4.20%
1892	3,525	45.71%	2,334	30.26%	1,853	24.03%
1896	3,631	46.86%	3,908	50.44%	209	2.70%
1900	3,800	54.91%	2,678	38.69%	443	6.40%
1904	4,303	59.52%	1,398	19.34%	1,529	21.15%
1908	5,412	57.56%	2,393	25.45%	1,598	16.99%
1912	63	0.29%	9,731	44.79%	11,934	54.92%
1916	16,978	46.47%	16,815	46.02%	2,744	7.51%
1920	19,826	63.78%	8,478	27.27%	2,783	8.95%
1924	22,726	48.99%	2,944	6.35%	20,721	44.67%
1928	47,769	67.14%	22,749	31.97%	633	0.89%
1932	35,305	41.46%	45,622	53.58%	4,223	4.96%
1936	35,686	35.04%	64,628	63.45%	1,540	1.51%
1940	55,434	43.27%	71,188	55.57%	1,488	1.16%
1944	75,746	45.42%	89,959	53.94%	1,059	0.64%
1948	101,552	49.43%	98,217	47.80%	5,690	2.77%
1952	186,091	63.50%	105,255	35.92%	1,688	0.58%
1956	195,742	64.47%	106,716	35.15%	1,147	0.38%
1960	223,056	56.41%	171,259	43.31%	1,106	0.28%
1964	214,445	50.31%	211,808	49.69%	33	0.01%
1968	261,540	56.26%	167,669	36.07%	35,654	7.67%
1972	371,627	61.82%	206,455	34.34%	23,055	3.84%
1976	353,302	55.74%	263,654	41.60%	16,839	2.66%
1980	435,910	60.81%	195,410	27.26%	85,546	11.93%
1984	502,344	65.30%	257,029	33.41%	9,894	1.29%
1988	523,143	60.19%	333,264	38.34%	12,788	1.47%
1992	352,125	35.69%	367,397	37.24%	267,124	27.07%
1996	402,876	45.57%	389,964	44.11%	91,311	10.33%
2000	475,736	49.63%	437,666	45.66%	45,232	4.72%
2004	596,033	52.45%	526,437	46.33%	13,881	1.22%
2008	541,032	43.79%	666,581	53.95%	27,890	2.26%
2012	536,726	44.95%	626,957	52.51%	30,266	2.53%
2016	477,766	36.43%	735,476	56.07%	98,376	7.50%
2020	600,094	37.46%	964,650	60.21%	37,399	2.33%
2024	593,270	40.28%	841,372	57.13%	38,081	2.59%

San Diego County vote by party in gubernatorial elections
Year	GOP	DEM
2022	44.2% 455,107	55.8% 574,121
2018	43.1% 499,532	56.9% 658,346
2014	48.9% 331,942	51.1% 346,419
2010	49.8% 452,205	44.0% 399,845
2006	65.5% 509,059	30.2% 234,938
2003	59.5% 485,563	23.6% 192,605
2002	51.7% 342,095	40.6% 268,278
1998	46.3% 340,834	49.5% 364,169
1994	63.4% 477,439	32.0% 240,937
1990	57.1% 383,959	36.4% 244,759
1986	65.2% 381,094	31.5% 184,395
1982	52.8% 330,037	44.6% 279,113
1978	35.9% 197,167	57.5% 316,223
1974	54.2% 249,444	42.8% 196,930
1970	60.1% 253,378	37.5% 158,098
1966	63.8% 252,070	36.2% 142,890
1962	55.8% 201,969	42.4% 153,389

Before 2008, San Diego County historically had been a Republican stronghold. The Republican presidential nominee carried the county in every presidential election from 1948 through 2004, except in 1992 when Bill Clinton won a plurality. In 2008, Barack Obama became the first Democratic presidential candidate to win a majority of votes in San Diego County since World War II; he won a majority of county votes again in 2012. In 2016, Hillary Clinton won the county by almost 20%, the largest margin for a Democratic presidential candidate since 1936. In 2020, Joseph R Biden, Jr. won by an even larger 22.7% margin.

The city of San Diego itself is more Democratic than the county's average and has voted for Democrats Clinton, Gore, Kerry, Obama twice, Clinton, and Biden respectively, in the last eight presidential elections. With a few exceptions, areas close to the Mexican border tend to be more Democratic, while North County tends to be more Republican. In the 2004 presidential election, San Diego, Encinitas, National City, Del Mar, and some other areas voted for John Kerry; San Marcos, Escondido, Carlsbad, Oceanside, Coronado, Santee, Poway, El Cajon, and Vista overwhelmingly backed George W. Bush. Chula Vista, La Mesa, Lemon Grove, Solana Beach, and Imperial Beach are considered swing areas of the county – Chula Vista and Imperial Beach narrowly backed Al Gore in 2000 but narrowly voted for Bush in 2004, while Solana Beach switched from Bush in 2000 to Kerry in 2004. La Mesa narrowly voted for Bush both times, and Lemon Grove narrowly went Democratic both times. However, all of these swing areas, along with Oceanside and Carlsbad voted for Obama in 2008 (Carlsbad voted for Obama by a plurality).

Notably, the city of Coronado supported every Republican presidential candidate from 1964 to 2016, and likely earlier given the voting patterns of the county in that era. However, in 2020, the city of Coronado broke its decades-long Republican voting streak by selecting the Democratic candidate, Joe Biden.

== Election Central ==
San Diego County uses Golden Hall, a convention facility next to San Diego's City Hall, as "Election Central." The County Registrar of Voters rents the hall to distribute election results. Supporters and political observers gather to watch the results come in; supporters of the various candidates parade around the hall, carrying signs and chanting; candidates give their victory and concession speeches and host parties for campaign volunteers and donors at the site; and television stations broadcast live from the floor of the convention center. The atmosphere at Election Central on the evening of election day has been compared to the voting portion of a political party national convention.

=== Federal and state representation ===
In the United States House of Representatives, San Diego County is split between five congressional districts:

- California's 48th congressional district, represented by Republican Darrell Issa
- California's 49th congressional district, represented by Democrat Mike Levin
- California's 50th congressional district, represented by Democrat Scott Peters
- California's 51st congressional district, represented by Democrat Sara Jacobs
- California's 52nd congressional district, represented by Democrat Juan Vargas

In the California State Assembly, San Diego County is split between seven legislative districts:

- the 74th Assembly district, represented by Republican Laurie Davies
- the 75th Assembly district, represented by Republican Carl DeMaio
- the 76th Assembly district, represented by Democrat Darshana Patel
- the 77th Assembly district, represented by Democrat Tasha Boerner
- the 78th Assembly district, represented by Democrat Chris Ward
- the 79th Assembly district, represented by Democrat LaShae Sharp-Collins
- the 80th Assembly district, represented by Democrat David Alvarez

In the California State Senate, San Diego County is split between five legislative districts:

- the 18th senatorial district, represented by Democrat Steve Padilla
- the 32nd senatorial district, represented by Republican Kelly Seyarto
- the 38th senatorial district, represented by Democrat Catherine Blakespear
- the 39th senatorial district, represented by Democrat Akilah Weber Pierson
- the 40th senatorial district, represented by Republican Brian Jones

=== Voter registration ===
Registered Voters (2023) (Note: Percentage of registered voters with respect to eligible voters. Percentages of party members with respect to registered voters follow.)
Eligible Voters	2,342,325	–
Registered voters	1,929,903	82.39%
Democratic	803,065	41.61%
Republican	518,458	26.86%
No party preference	470,627	24.39%
American Independent	80,439	4.17%
Libertarian	24,340	1.26%
Peace and Freedom	9,671	0.50%
Unknown	8,581	0.44%
Green	7,911	0.41%
Other	6,811	0.35%

As of February 2023, there are 2,342,325 eligible voters, in which 1,929,903 are registered voters in San Diego County. Of those, 803,065 (41.61%) are registered Democratic, 518,458 (26.86%) are registered Republican, 470,627 (24.39%) declined to state a political party, 80,439 (4.17%) are registered American Independent, 24,340 (1.26%) are registered Libertarian, 9,671 (0.50%) are registered Peace and Freedom, 8,581 (0.44%) are unknown, 7,911 (0.41%) are registered Green, and the remaining 6,811 (0.35%) are other.

==== Voter registration by city ====
Cities by population and voter registration
City	Population	Registered voters	Democratic	Republican	D–R spread	Other	No party preference
Carlsbad	112,008	62.7%	30.6%	37.0%	-6.4%	5.4%	27.0%
Chula Vista	260,598	50.6%	42.5%	22.3%	+20.2%	4.4%	30.8%
Coronado	24,852	41.6%	25.4%	43.3%	-17.9%	5.2%	26.1%
Del Mar	4,312	71.5%	36.2%	32.6%	+3.7%	4.8%	26.4%
El Cajon	102,894	40.7%	33.3%	34.2%	-0.9%	6.0%	26.5%
Encinitas	62,160	65.0%	37.9%	29.1%	+8.8%	5.7%	27.4%
Escondido	149,912	42.8%	31.8%	34.7%	-2.9%	6.0%	27.5%
Imperial Beach	27,180	45.1%	38.0%	23.1%	+14.3%	6.9%	31.4%
La Mesa	59,125	56.9%	39.3%	28.3%	+11.0%	6.5%	25.9%
Lemon Grove	26,421	53.1%	43.8%	22.7%	+21.0%	6.0%	27.5%
National City	60,349	38.0%	47.3%	14.8%	+32.5%	4.6%	33.3%
Oceanside	173,829	50.8%	33.4%	33.4%	-0.0%	6.1%	27.1%
Poway	49,675	58.4%	26.9%	41.5%	-14.6%	5.3%	26.2%
San Diego	1,374,812	52.6%	41.3%	22.9%	+18.4%	5.3%	30.6%
San Marcos	91,479	46.5%	32.3%	34.5%	-2.2%	5.6%	27.6%
Santee	56,839	59.2%	27.2%	42.0%	-14.8%	6.3%	24.5%
Solana Beach	13,312	64.5%	34.9%	33.2%	+1.7%	5.2%	26.8%
Vista	98,560	43.2%	33.6%	31.4%	+2.2%	6.2%	28.8%

== Gay rights ==
On Nov 4, 2008 San Diego County voted 53.71% for Proposition 8 which amended the California Constitution to ban same-sex marriages, thus restoring Proposition 22 which was overturned by a ruling from the California Supreme Court. However the city of San Diego, along with the North County coastal towns of Del Mar, Encinitas, and Solana Beach, voted against Proposition 8. La Mesa was a virtual tie for the proposition, while Carlsbad only supported the proposition by a 2% margin.
