= 2021 California's 79th State Assembly district special election =

- April 6, 2021

California's 79th State Assembly district
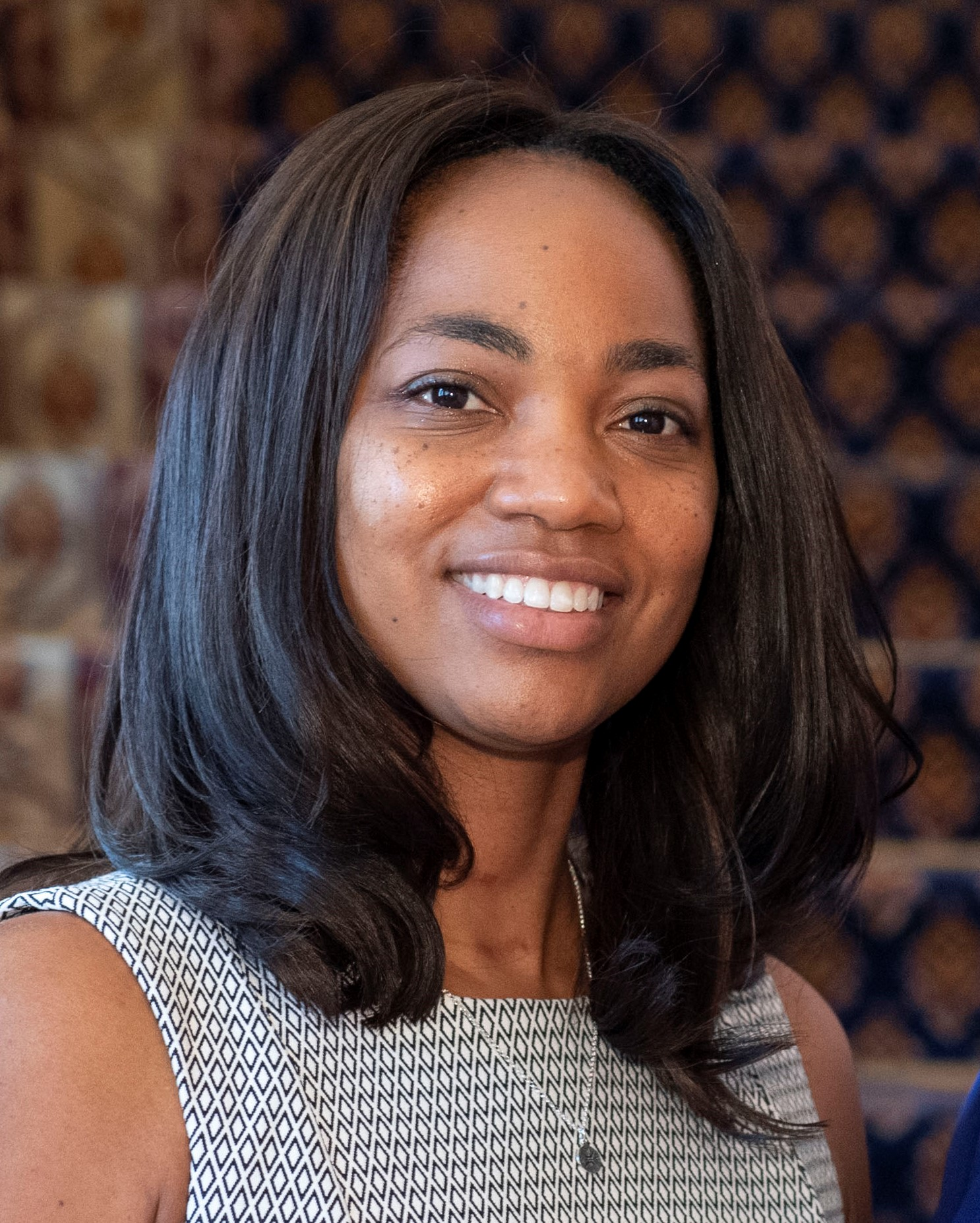

Nominee	Akilah Weber	Marco Contreras
Party	Democratic	Republican
Popular vote	33,197	21,359
Percentage	51.97%	33.44%
Nominee	Leticia Munguia	Shane Parmely
Party	Democratic	Democratic
Popular vote	5,263	3,241
Percentage	8.24%	5.07%
Assemblymember before election
Shirley Weber
Democratic
Elected Assemblymember
Akilah Weber
Democratic

The 2021 California's 79th State Assembly district special election was held on April 6, 2021. Democratic nominee Akilah Weber defeated Republican nominee Marco Contreras and three other Democratic candidates to succeed Shirley Weber in the California State Assembly.

Weber, who had served in the state assembly since her election in 2012, was appointed to serve as Secretary of State of California. Governor Gavin Newsom called a special election which was won by Weber's daughter in the primary without the need of the second top-two election.

== Background ==
Shirley Weber was elected to the California State Assembly from the 79th district during the 2012 election. Alex Padilla, the Secretary of State of California, resigned from his position after being appointed to the United States Senate and James Schwab was selected to serve as interim secretary of state. Weber was appointed by Governor Gavin Newsom on December 22, 2020, to serve as secretary of state and was sworn in on January 29, 2021.

On February 2, Newsom called a special election for the 79th district with a primary held on April 6, and the general held on June 8.

== Campaign ==
Akilah Weber, the daughter of Weber, Aeiramique Glass Blake, a member of the San Diego Chief of Police Board of Advisors and the San Diego City Attorney’s Advisory Board, Leticia Munguia, an investigator for the San Diego Alternate Public Defender, and Shane Suzanne Parmely, a teacher, ran in the election as member of the Democratic Party. Marco Contreras ran as a member of the Republican Party.

Ammar Campa-Najjar, who had unsuccessfully ran for a seat in the United States House of Representatives in the 2018 and 2020 elections, announced that he would not run after having formed an exploratory committee stating that the district should be represented by a woman of color.

Weber won in the primary with over fifty percent of the popular vote which resulted in her becoming a member of the state assembly without the second top-two election being held.

=== Declared ===
- Aeiramique Glass Blake (Democratic), advisor to San Diego Chief of Police and City Attorney
- Marco Contreras (Republican), small business owner
- Leticia Munguia (Democratic), investigator
- Shane Suzanne Parmely (Democratic), educator
- Akilah Weber (Democratic), pediatrician and daughter of Shirley Weber

=== Declined ===
- Ammar Campa-Najjar (Democratic), candidate for California's 50th congressional district in 2018 and 2020

== Endorsements ==
Marco Contreras (R)

State officials

- Shannon Grove, member of the California State Senate from the 16th district
- Shirley Horton, former member of the California State Assembly from the 78th district
- Brian Jones, member of the California State Senate from the 38th district
- Devon Mathis, member of the California State Assembly from the 26th district
- Melissa Melendez, member of the California State Senate from the 28th district
- Lawrence Stirling, former member of the California State Senate
- Suzette Martinez Valladares, member of the California State Assembly from the 38th district
- Marie Waldron, Minority Leader of the California State Assembly

Local officials

- Joel Anderson, member of the San Diego County Board of Supervisors from the 2nd district
- Carl DeMaio, member of the San Diego City Council from the 5th district
- Chris Cate, member of the San Diego City Council from the 6th district
- Jim Desmond, member of the San Diego County Board of Supervisors from the 5th district

Organizations

- California Republican Party
Akilah Weber (D)

Federal officials

- Scott Peters, member of the United States House of Representatives from California's 52nd congressional district

Statewide officials

- Fiona Ma, 34th California State Treasurer

State officials

- Cecilia Aguiar-Curry, member of the California State Assembly from the 4th district
- Toni Atkins, 51st President pro tempore of the California State Senate
- Steven Bradford, member of the California State Senate from the 35th district
- Autumn Burke, member of the California State Assembly from the 62nd district
- Jim Cooper, member of the California State Assembly from the 9th district
- Tom Daly, member of the California State Assembly from the 69th district
- Laura Friedman, member of the California State Assembly from the 43rd district
- Cristina Garcia, member of the California State Assembly from the 58th district
- Mike Gipson, member of the California State Assembly from the 64th district
- Jacqui Irwin, member of the California State Assembly from the 44th district
- Christine Kehoe, former member of the California State Senate from the 39th district
- Evan Low, member of the California State Assembly from the 28th district
- Kevin McCarty, member of the California State Assembly from the 7th district
- Richard Pan, member of the California State Senate from the 6th district
- Cottie Petrie-Norris, member of the California State Assembly from the 74th district
- Blanca Rubio, member of the California State Assembly from the 48th district
- Sharon Quirk-Silva, member of the California State Assembly from the 65th district
- Buffy Wicks, member of the California State Assembly from the 15th district

Local officials

- Todd Gloria, 37th mayor of San Diego
- Holly Mitchell, member of the Los Angeles County Board of Supervisors from the 2nd district
- Steve Padilla, member of the Chula Vista, California city council
- Monica Montgomery Steppe, member of the San Diego City Council from the 4th district

Individuals

- Dolores Huerta, labor leader

Newspapers

- The San Diego Union-Tribune

Organizations

- California Legislative Black Caucus
- Courage California
- League of Conservation Voters
- NARAL Pro-Choice America
- Sierra Club
- Young Democrats of America

== Finance ==
Candidate	Campaign committee		
Candidate	Raised	Spent	COH
Aeiramique Glass Blake	$6,320.71	$4,772.99	$3,908.91
Marco Contreras	$129,232.01	$103,301.30	$77,609.53
Leticia Munguia	$51,617.21	$22,945.97	$33,837.00
Shane Parmely	$23,228.00	$23,228.00	$0.00
Akilah Weber	$307,865.28	$266,945.87	$129,751.20

== Polling ==
Poll source	Date(s) administered	Sample size	Margin of error	Ammar Campa-Najjar (D)	John McCann (R)	Akilah Weber (D)	Others/ Undecided
Strategies 360	January 19, 2021		± ?	22%	26%	14%	38%

== Results ==
2021 California's 79th State Assembly district special election
Party	Candidate	Votes	%
Democratic	Akilah Weber	33,197	51.97
Republican	Marco Contreras	21,359	33.44
Democratic	Leticia Munguia	5,263	8.24
Democratic	Shane Suzanne Parmely	3,241	5.07
Democratic	Aeiramique Glass Blake	818	1.28
Total votes		63,878	100.00
Democratic hold			
