= California Legislative Black Caucus =

American political organization

The California Legislative Black Caucus, also known as the CLBC, is a California political organization composed of African Americans elected to the California State Legislature.

== Priorities ==
The California Legislative Black Caucus represents and advocates for the interests of Black people throughout California. It seeks to increase African American participation and representation in all levels of government. Since the formation of the California Legislative Black Caucus (LBC), the core mission of the LBC has been to close (and, ultimately, to eliminate) disparities that exist between African-Americans and white Americans in every aspect of life. Specific priorities of the LBC include:

- Increase Black representation in all levels of government, including statewide appointments and statewide elected offices.
- Creating employment opportunities and economic security for African Americans.
- Ensure the African American community has equal access to education, social services, health, mental health, and other government programs and services.
- Preserve safety net health, mental health, and social service programs that serve the African American community.
- Strengthen protections against hate crimes and defend the civil rights and liberties of Blacks.
- Fight racial stereotypes and negative portrayals of Blacks in the media.
- Promote greater civic participation and knowledge about major policy issues among the African American communities.
- Closing the achievement and opportunity gaps in education.
- Assuring quality health care for every Californian.
- Building wealth and business development for all Californians.
- Ensuring justice for all.
- Retirement security for all Californians.

== History ==
The California Legislative Black Caucus was formed in 1967 when black members of the California Legislature joined to strengthen their efforts to address the legislative concerns of black and minority citizens. The members believed that a black caucus in the California Legislature, speaking with a single voice, would provide political influence and visibility far beyond their numbers.

In 2007, more than a year before the general election, all but one of the members of the LBC endorsed Barack Obama for president.

== Current membership ==
Officers are elected from within the LBC with representation from both the Assembly and Senate members.

=== Officers ===
Position	Officer	party	District
Chair	Akilah Weber	Democrat	39th State Senate district (Note: Previously served as a representative from the 79th State Assembly district (2021-2024))
Vice-chair	Isaac Bryan	Democrat	55th State Assembly district
Treasurer	Mia Bonta	Democrat	18th State Assembly district
Secretary	Corey Jackson	Democrat	60th State Assembly district

=== Members ===
Member	party	District
Sade Elhawary	Democrat	57th State Assembly district
Mike Gipson	Democrat	65th State Assembly district (Note: Previously served as a representative from the 64th State Assembly district (2014-2022))
Tina McKinnor	Democrat	62st State Assembly district (Note: Previously served as a representative from the 61st State Assembly district (2022))
Rhodesia Ransom	Democrat	13th State Assembly district
Laura Richardson	Democrat	35th State Senate district (Note: Previously served as a representative from the 55th State Assembly district (2006-2007))
LaShae Sharp-Collins	Democrat	79th State Assembly district
Lola Smallwood-Cuevas	Democrat	28th State Senate district
Lori Wilson	Democrat	11th State Assembly district

=== Ex-officio members ===
Ex-officio Member	party	Office
Shirley Weber	Democrat	Secretary of State (Note: Previously served as a representative from the 79th State Assembly district (2012-2021))
Tony Thurmond	Democrat	Superintendent of Public Instruction (Note: Previously served as a representative from the 15th State Assembly district (2014-2018))
Malia Cohen	Democrat	State Treasurer

== Former members ==
Former Member	party	District	Time in office
Frederick Madison Roberts	Republican	74th State Assembly district (1919–1931); 62nd State Assembly district (1931–1935)	1919–1935
Augustus F. Hawkins	Democrat	62nd State Assembly district	1935–1963
William Byron Rumford	Democrat	17th State Assembly district	1949–1967
Mervyn Dymally	Democrat	53rd State Assembly district (1963–1967); 29th State Senate district (1967–1975); 52nd State Assembly district (2002–2008)	1963–1975; 2002-2008
F. Douglas Ferrell	Democrat	55th State Assembly district	1963–1967
Willie Brown	Democrat	18th State Assembly district (1965–1974); 17th State Assembly district (1974–1992); 13th State Assembly district (1992–1995)	1965–1995
Yvonne Brathwaite Burke	Democrat	63rd State Assembly district	1967–1973
Bill Greene	Democrat	53rd State Assembly district (1967–1974); 47th State Assembly district (1974–1975); 29th State Senate district (1975–1984); 27th State Senate district (1984–1992)	1967–1992
John J. Miller	Democrat	17th State Assembly district (1967–1974); 13th State Assembly district (1974–1978)	1967–1978
Leon D. Ralph	Democrat	55th State Assembly district (1967–1974); 48th State Assembly district (1974–1976)	1967–1976
Frank Holoman	Democrat	65th State Assembly district	1973–1974
Julian Dixon	Democrat	63rd State Assembly district (1973–1974); 49th State Assembly district (1974–1978)	1973–1978
Nate Holden	Democrat	30th State Senate district	1974–1978
Curtis R. Tucker, Sr.	Democrat	50th State Assembly district	1974–1988
Teresa Patterson Hughes	Democrat	47th State Assembly district (1975–1992); 25th State Senate district (1992–2000)	1975–2000
Maxine Waters	Democrat	48th State Assembly district	1976-1990
Gwen Moore	Democrat	49th State Assembly district (1978–1992); 47th State Assembly district (1992–1994)	1978-1994
Elihu Harris	Democrat	13th State Assembly district	1978-1990
Diane Watson	Democrat	30th State Senate district (1978–1982); 28th State Senate district (1982–1994); 26th State Senate district (1994–1998)	1978-1998
Willard H. Murray Jr.	Democrat	54th State Assembly district (1978–1992); 52nd State Assembly district (1992–1996)	1988-1996
Curtis R. Tucker, Jr.	Democrat	50th State Assembly district (1989-1992); 51st State Assembly district (1992–1996)	1989–1996
Marguerite Archie-Hudson	Democrat	48th State Assembly district	1990–1996
Barbara Lee	Democrat	13th State Assembly district (1990-1992); 16th State Assembly district (1992-1996); 9th State Senate district (1996-1998)	1990–1998
Steven Bradford	Democrat	51st State Assembly district (2009–2012); 62nd State Assembly district (2009–2012); 35th State Senate district (2016–2024)	2009-2014, and 2016-2024
