= Leon Williams (politician) =

American politician (1922–2025)

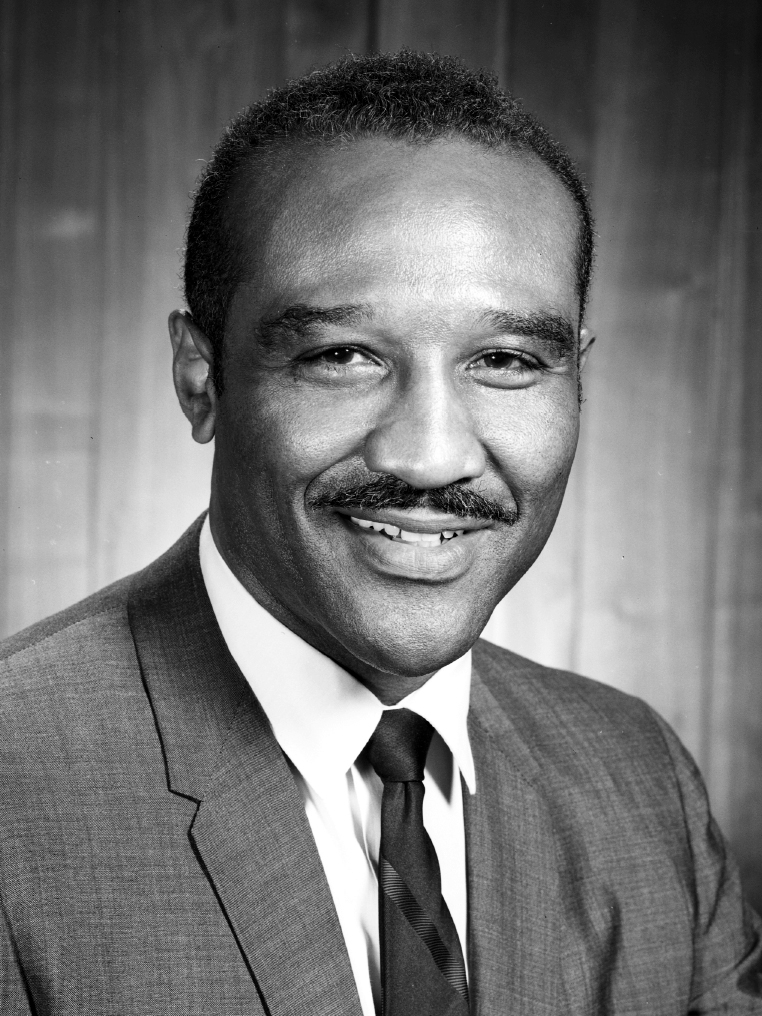
- Official portrait, 1969

Chair of the San Diego County Board of Supervisors
- In office January 5, 1990 – January 5, 1991
- Preceded by: Susan Golding
- Succeeded by: John MacDonald
- In office January 5, 1985 – January 5, 1986
- Preceded by: Tom Hamilton
- Succeeded by: Paul Eckert

Member of the San Diego County Board of Supervisors for the 4th district
- In office December 20, 1982 – 1994
- Preceded by: Jim Bates
- Succeeded by: Ron Roberts

Member of the San Diego City Council from the 4th district
- In office January 7, 1969 – December 20, 1982
- Preceded by: Tom Hom
- Succeeded by: William Jones

Personal details
- Born: July 21, 1922 Oklahoma, U.S.
- Died: March 1, 2025 (aged 102) San Diego, California, U.S.
- Party: Democratic
- Spouse: Margaret Jackson Williams (d. 2016)
- Children: 10
- Education: San Diego State University (B.A.)

Leon Lawson Williams (July 21, 1922 – March 1, 2025) was an American politician. He served as a member of the San Diego City Council starting from 1969 to 1982. He also was elected as a member of the San Diego County Board of Supervisors for three terms from 1982 to 1994, chairing the board in 1985 and 1990. He was the first Black person elected to these positions. Dubbed "Mr. San Diego" by the San Diego Rotary Club, he has been described as having left one of "the most significant legacies in San Diego's history", prioritizing civil rights and equitable development in San Diego.

== Life and career ==
Williams was born on July 21, 1922 in Oklahoma, the oldest of 15 children. His family, amid the Dust Bowl, moved to Bakersfield, California. He would later move to the San Diego area in 1941 as he served in the United States Army Corps of Engineers at North Island Naval Air Station. He encountered racism upon arriving in San Diego, having recounted a racist incident when he had attempted to check into the Hotel Pickwick and was told that they "didn't serve [his] kind".

Williams served in World War II in a segregated Army unit. After returning to San Diego from the war, he became the first Black person to buy a house in the Golden Hill neighborhood in 1947, in defiance of the racial covenant that was part of his house's deed at the time he purchased it. He lived in the house until his death.

He graduated with a degree in psychology from San Diego State College (now San Diego State University) in 1950. He also studied law and public policy. While at San Diego State, he participated in sit-in protests in order to end segregation in San Diego.

Williams was married to Margaret Jackson Williams, a long-time educator, with whom he had 10 children. She died in 2016.

=== Political career ===
==== San Diego City councilman: 1969–1982 ====
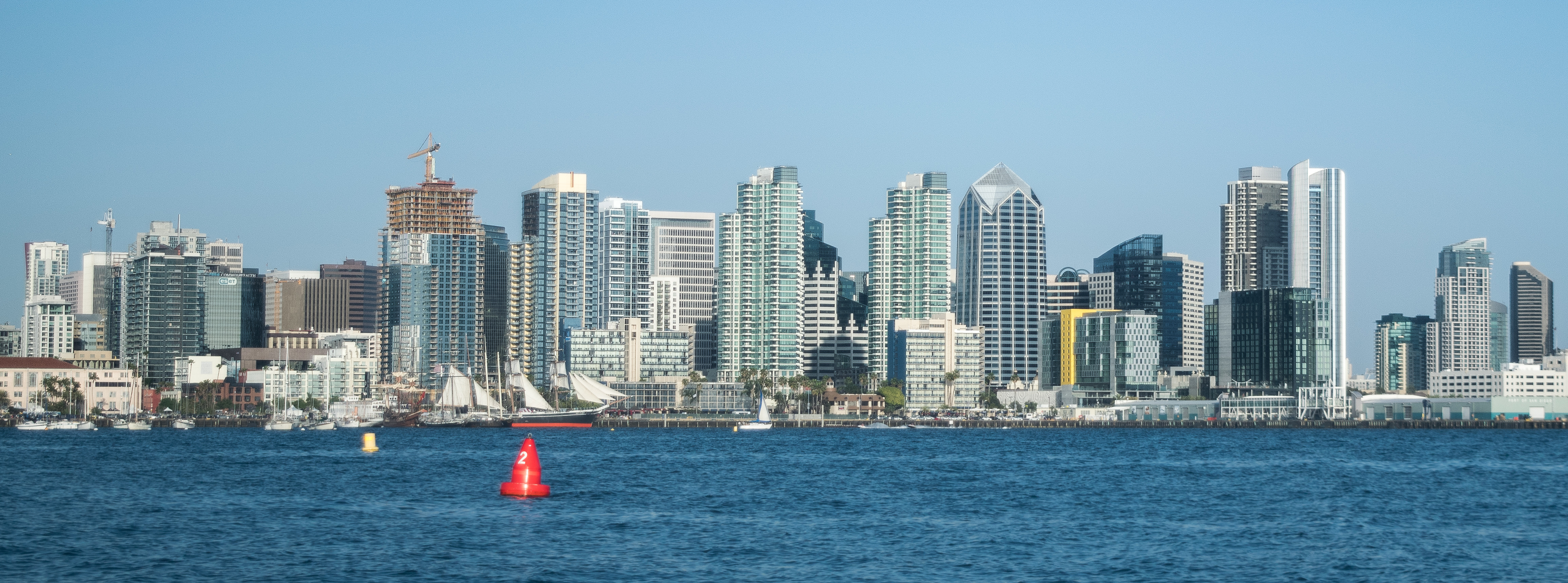
Downtown San Diego, part of the council district that Williams represented. Williams played a major part in the redevelopment of downtown.

Williams, with the support of a multiethnic community group, was appointed to the San Diego City Council in 1969 after Tom Hom resigned following his win to a seat in the California State Assembly. He was the first Black person to serve on the council. He represented the 4th district, which at that time included Downtown San Diego, as well as Southeast San Diego and the San Ysidro neighborhood. Due to the low wages of city council members at the time, he worked part-time as a teacher, as well as at a yogurt shop near San Diego State's campus that he later sold. He was elected to the seat in his own right in 1969. He would continue to face racism, including an incident where a police officer approached his car, with his gun drawn, as he was reviewing city council documents near Balboa Park.

Williams, along with former state senator Jim Mills, helped formulate what would become the San Diego Metropolitan Transit System (MTS) in the 1970s.

As mentioned by former San Diego City Council president Tony Young, he had been prioritizing issues such as the redeveloping of downtown and Southeast San Diego, smart growth policies, as well as health initiatives such as banning smoking and funding HIV/AIDS programs in the city, at a time when such ideas were not widely popular. He would also be responsible for the creation of emergency call boxes along San Diego highways, as well as the Office of Public Defenders and local Hate Crimes Registry. Williams advocated for the revitalization of Balboa Park, the removal of redlining policies from city land use codes, and for community-oriented policing.

Williams would be succeeded by his chief of staff and close friend William Jones, whom he had previously mentored.

==== San Diego County Board of Supervisors: 1982–1994 ====
Williams became a member of the San Diego County Board of Supervisors in 1982, and was elected to three terms. He served as the chairman of the Board from 1985 to 1986, and again from 1990 to 1991. His district, at the time, encompassed much of the city of San Diego.

During his 1986 reelection campaign, he asserted that, as a result of his presence on the Board, there were improvements in the county government, and that the Board became "a more unified body and much less prone to factionalism than it was in the past." He advocated for changes to state and federal laws that he said denied San Diego of "its fair share of tax dollars." He also rebuffed calls by fellow supervisor Paul Eckert for a conservative challenger for Williams' seat. He retired from the office, and from public office in general, in 1994. During his time in public office, he became renowned for never having lost a race.

Williams would be the last Black member of the San Diego County Board of Supervisors until the election of Monica Montgomery Steppe in 2023.

=== Post-political career ===
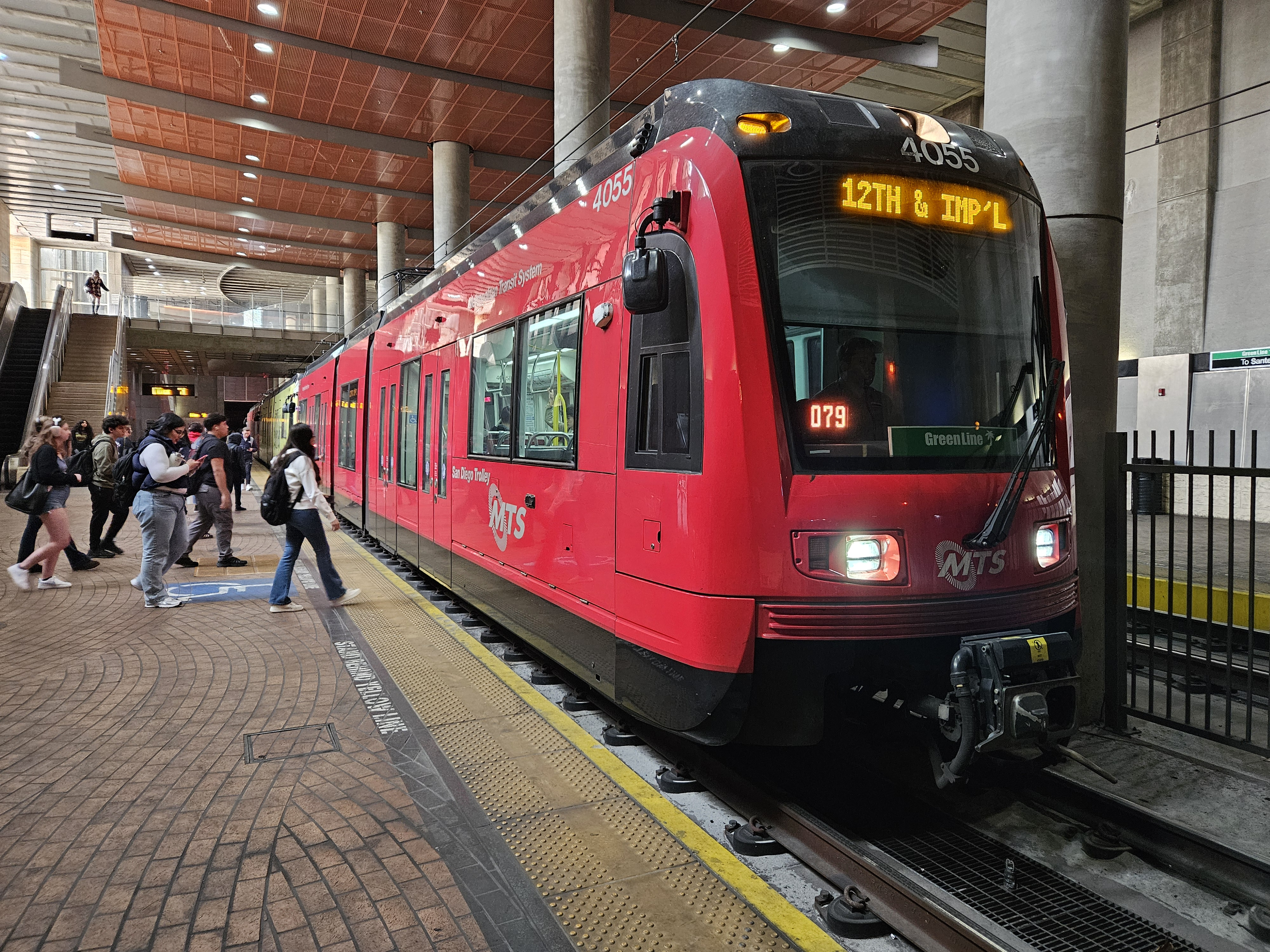
The SDSU Transit Center, of which Williams was a prominent supporter for its construction, in 2024.

In 1992, Williams became the first Black president of the California Association of Counties in 1993 and first Black board member of the National Association of Counties.

In 1999, he established a scholarship fund with the San Diego Foundation with the goal of supporting Black students from San Diego who attend a four-year university, are pursuing degrees in health or healthcare, and who demonstrate commitment to improve health outcomes in the San Diego area. The fund has awarded over $40,000 to students.

He also helped to establish the Southeastern Economic Development Corporation and Centre City Development Corp. He served on the Metropolitan Transit District for 29 years, including having chaired the agency for 12 years. During his time with the agency board, he helped to pass through a project that built a station for the San Diego Trolley in the center of his alma mater, San Diego State. He pushed for the central location as opposed to an alternative location on the northern edge of campus, which he saw as inconvenient. Opened in 2005, the station was dedicated in his name in 2011. He retired from the agency in 2006.

=== Awards and recognition ===
Williams was a lifetime member of the SDSU Alumni Association, and was named as a Distinguished Alumni of the College of Arts and Letters in 2003. In 2007, he received an honorary doctorate in human relations from San Diego State University. He was later chosen for their Diversity Award in 2010. In 2015, a biography, titled Together We Can Do More, was published, with an event to celebrate the book held at the former Hotel Pickwick where had been subject to racism.

In 2020, the San Diego County Board of Supervisors reestablished the county's Human Relations Division and named it the Leon L. Williams San Diego County Human Relations Commission in his honor. The stated purpose of the commission is to "promote positive human relations, respect, and the integrity of every individual regardless of gender, religion, culture, ethnicity, sexual orientation, age, or citizenship status.”

In 2022, Williams received the Life Achievement Award from San Diego County. That same year, he turned 100.

=== Death ===
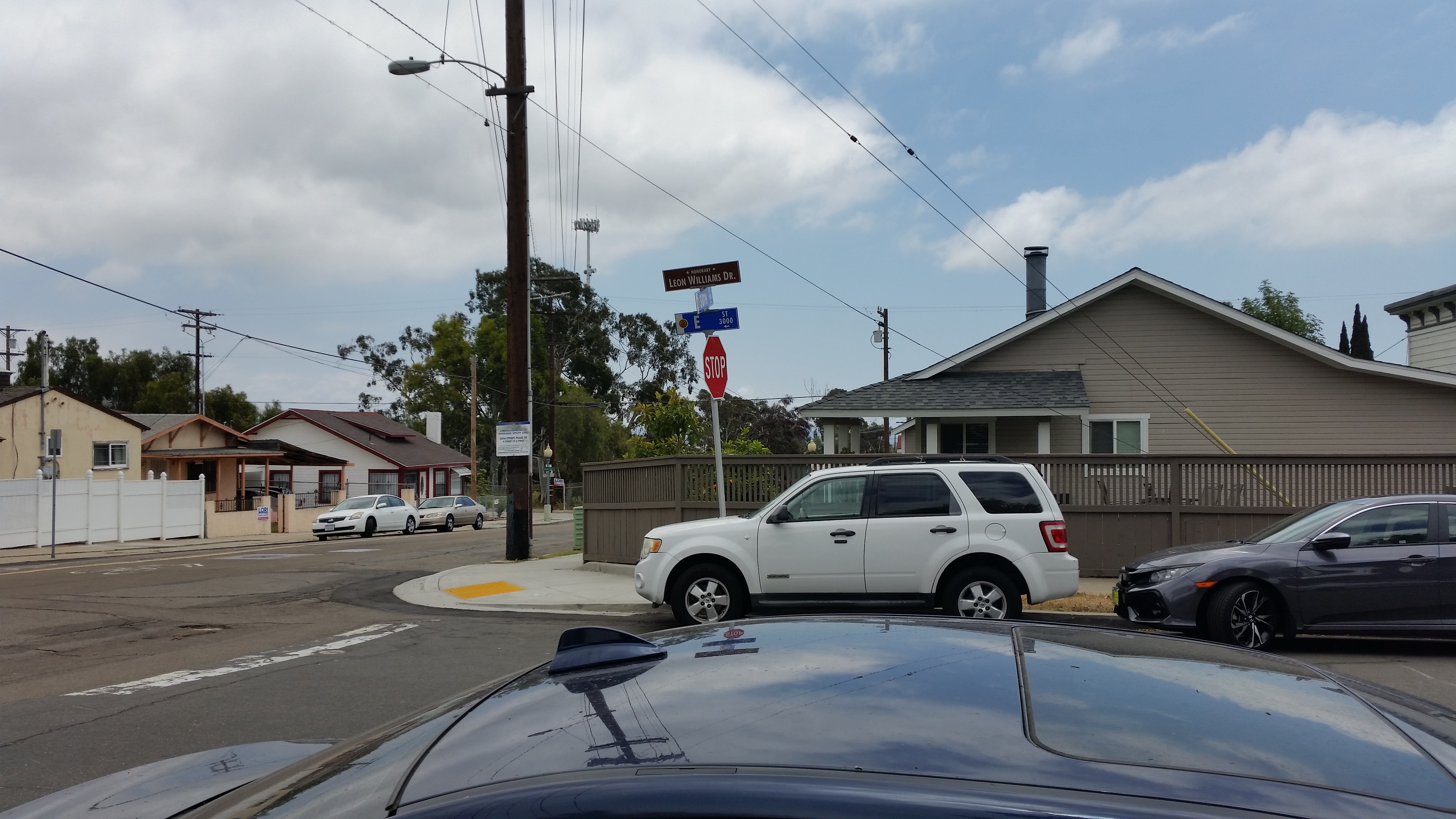
Leon Williams Drive in 2018.

Williams died from cardiac arrest at Scripps Mercy Hospital, on March 1, 2025, at the age of 102. He was survived by four siblings and his ten children. His funeral service took place at Calvary Baptist Church in San Diego, on March 28. Attendees included San Diego mayor Todd Gloria, California Secretary of State Shirley Weber, and former U.S. representative Brian Bilbray.

=== Legacy ===
Williams was described as a "soft spoken but eloquent speaker" who sought to work with anyone in order to achieve common goals. He was known as a "valuable, caring friend", as well as for his fashion sense, often wearing suits and a fedora.

At the time of his death, he was described as having left one of "the most significant legacies in San Diego's history", with him having prioritized civil rights and equitable development in San Diego. Weber described Williams as having opened the doors with "dignity and purpose" and bringing others with him. During his funeral, she further described him as the "moral conscience of the state, the city, and the county of San Diego", and that "we are better and stronger and more courageous because of him." The San Diego Union-Tribune described him as a person who "deeply wanted to improve the world around him."

Monica Montgomery Steppe described Williams in an X (formerly Twitter) post as the "heartbeat of San Diego, embodying the very spirit of our community." U.S. representative Scott Peters also wrote on X, stating that his “work to make San Diego a better, more fair and just place continues to inspire me today.” Former President pro tempore of the California State Senate Toni Atkins described him as “one of the finest individuals” and “a true gentleman” who was “a mentor to so many who followed in his footsteps to become civic leaders and change San Diego for the better.” San Diego city councillor Vivian Moreno would mention as well that Williams "shaped San Diego and paved the way for Black leaders" and sent "love to his family during this difficult time".

In 2017, the block of E Street where Williams lived was renamed "Leon Williams Drive" in his honor. San Diego State holds a collection of records pertaining to his work and legacy in their archives section.
