= Tom Hom =

American politician in the state of California (born 1927)

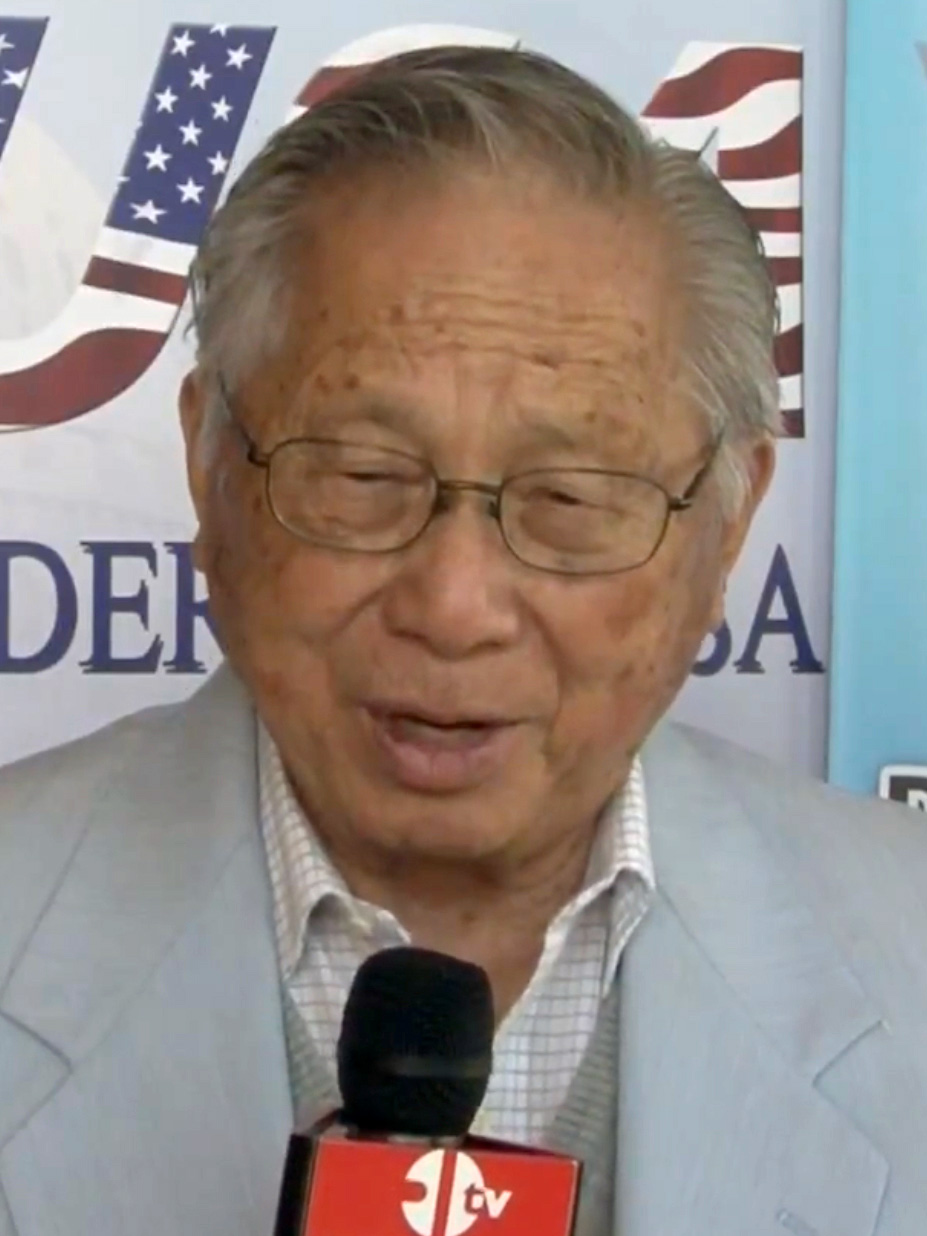
- Hom in 2019

Member of the California State Assembly from the 79th district
- In office January 6, 1969 – January 4, 1971
- Preceded by: Frederick James Bear
- Succeeded by: Peter R. Chacon

Member of the San Diego City Council
- In office December 1963 – January 6, 1969
- Preceded by: Frank Curran
- Succeeded by: Leon Williams
- Constituency: 5th district (1963–1965); 4th district (1965–1969)

Personal details
- Born: Hom Cheuck Ngee; February 15, 1927 (age 99) San Diego, California, U.S.
- Party: Republican
- Spouse(s): Dorothy Hom (m. 1948–1999) Loretta Hom
- Children: 6
- Education: University of California, San Diego
- Occupation: Real estate developer

Thomas Edward Hom (born Hom Cheuck Ngee; February 15, 1927) is an American politician in the state of California. In 1963 he became the first non-caucasian elected to the San Diego City Council. He served in the California State Assembly from 1968 to 1970. Hom represented the 79th Assembly District; he was the second Asian American elected to the California State Legislature.

== Background and early life ==
Hom's father came to the United States when he was only 15 years old with little cash aboard the Manchuria in 1909, changing his name to David due to influence from Presbyterian missionaries in China. In all he fathered 12 children. Hom's father named him after Thomas Edison; he also named his other children after notable Americans, such as Herbert Hoover and Paul Revere. Hom's mother died when Tom was four years old and his father died when Tom was 12. Prior to entering kindergarten, Hom was unable to speak English.

Beginning at the age of 15, he began to work at the family business, David Produce Company, and then graduated from San Diego High School. During World War II, Hom worked on a farm which his family had taken over from a Japanese American family; the farm was located on the present site of SDCCU Stadium. In 1947, he moved to North Park with his stepmother, overcoming racial covenants which would have barred them. Before becoming a politician Hom held multiple jobs, including work in food service, agriculture, and broadcasting. Taking classes at night, Hom went on to earn a degree in business administration from the University of California, San Diego.

== Political career ==
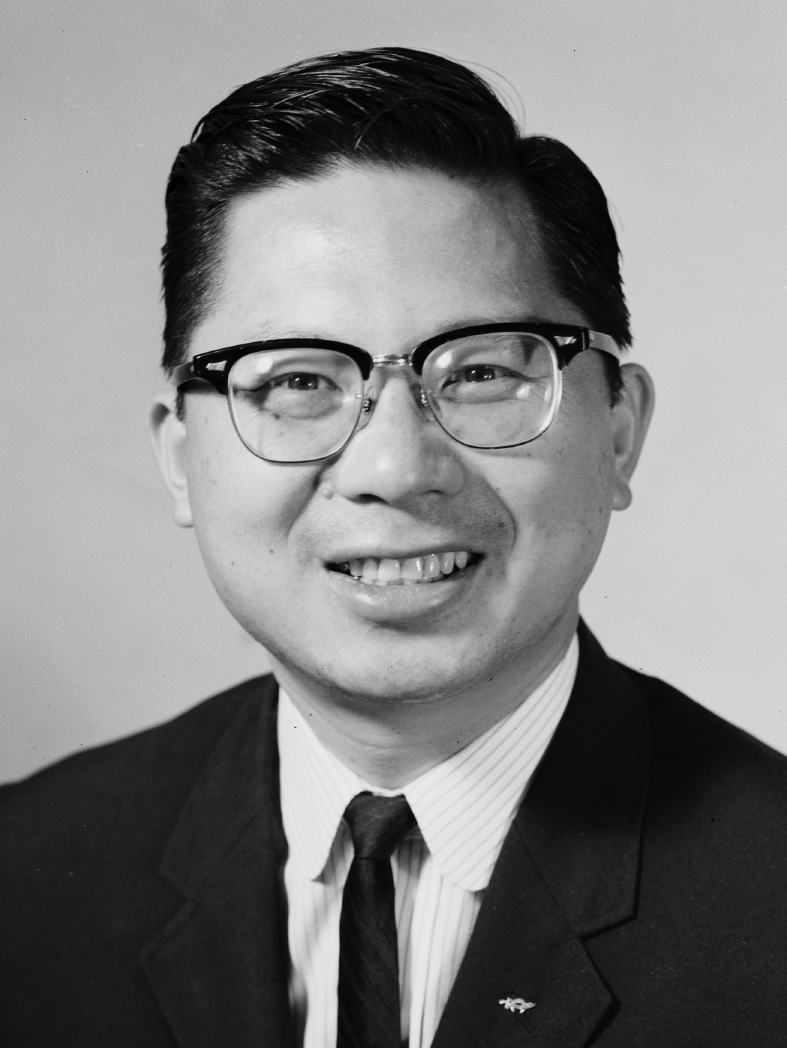
Hom in 1967 as a member of the San Diego City Council.

At the age of 36, Hom was elected to the San Diego City Council; by 1962, he was the deputy mayor of San Diego. When Hom was re-elected in 1967, he won with 87% of the vote, as of 2010 this has been largest plurality of the vote in any election in San Diego. While a politician, Hom was involved in getting San Diego Stadium built, and the gentrification of the Gaslamp Quarter. In 1968, with the encouragement of Ronald Reagan, Hom ran for a seat in the California State Assembly, and won. Until Chris Cate was elected in 2014, Hom had been the only Asian American to have been elected to the San Diego City Council.

== Post-political career ==
Founding a real estate company, named after himself, Hom played a major role in developing downtown San Diego; this began in 1973, when Hom and his brother purchased the building that had housed the Security Pacific National Bank, which was first built in 1884. Hom was the first president of the Gaslamp Quarter Association in 1982. Remaining involved in public policy Hom made an effort to save buildings important to the history of Chinese Americans in San Diego, criticizing reports on historical significance that lacked input from the Chinese American community. In the late 1990s his company went on to expand into projects in the Las Vegas area; this included low cost housing, with the construction of Campaige Place in 2000.

== Personal life ==
His family owned the Western Metal Supply Company, which was integrated into Petco Park when it was constructed. He was married to his wife Dorothy for 48 years until her death from cancer in 1999. In 2013, she was posthumously entered into the Hall of Fame of the Women's Museum of California. He married again, to Loretta, with whom he practices Tai Chi.

In 2014, Hom's autobiography was published; That same year the Rotary Club of San Diego presented to Hom the "Mr. San Diego" award, and San Diego Mayor Kevin Faulconer declared the day when he received the award to be Tom Hom Day. As of July 2015, Hom resides in Southeast Chula Vista. In 2017, his art work was displayed at the San Diego Chinese Historical Museum. As of 2021, Hom continues to live in Chula Vista with his wife.

== Bibliography ==
- Tom Hom (2014). Rabbit on a Bumpy Road: A Story of Courage and Endurance. Sunbelt Publications, Incorporated. ISBN 978-0-932653-44-4.
