= Denise Moreno Ducheny =

American lawyer and politician (born 1952)

Denise M. Ducheny
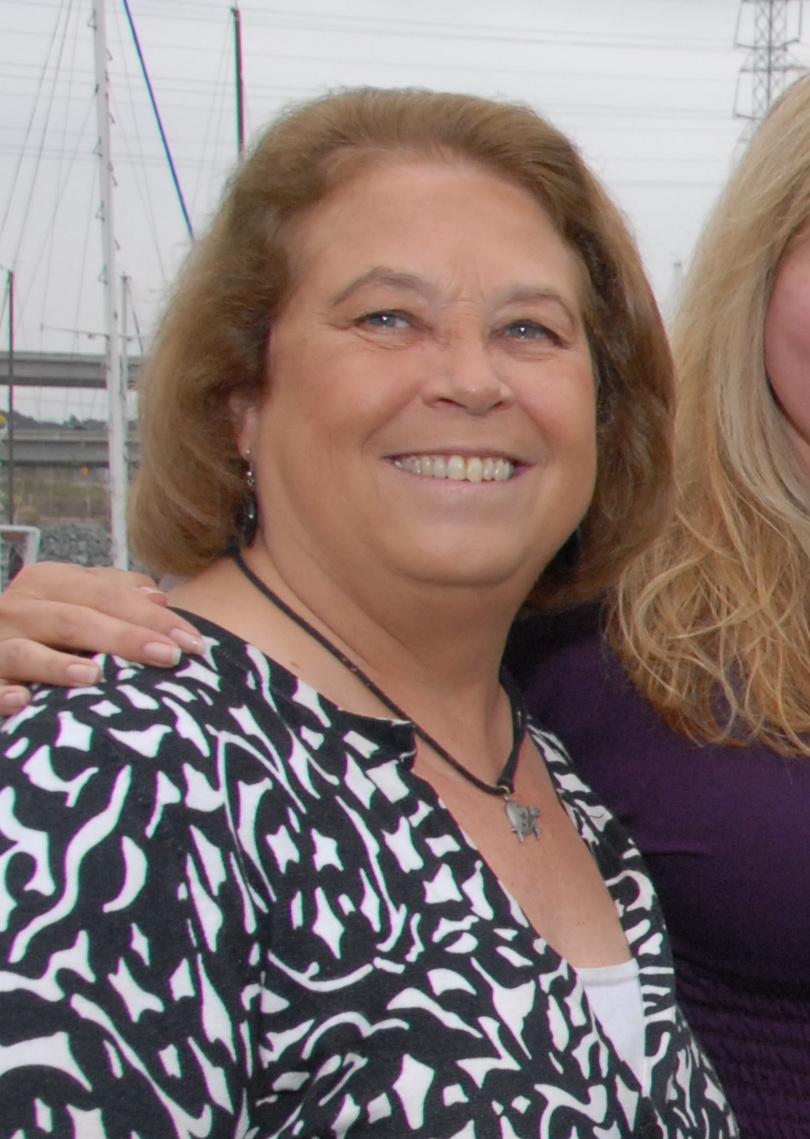

Member of the Board of Directors of the Border Environment Cooperation Commission
- Incumbent
- Assumed office 2014
- Appointed by: Barack Obama

Member of the Board of Directors of the North American Development Bank
- Incumbent
- Assumed office 2014
- Appointed by: Barack Obama

Member of the California Unemployment Insurance Appeals Board
- In office January 2011 – September 2011

Member of the California Senate from the 40th district
- In office December 2, 2002 – November 30, 2010
- Preceded by: James S. "Steve" Peace
- Succeeded by: Juan C. Vargas

Member of the California State Assembly from the 79th district
- In office April 14, 1994 – November 30, 2000
- Preceded by: James S. "Steve" Piece
- Succeeded by: Juan C. Vargas

Personal details
- Born: Denise Moreno; March 21, 1952 (age 74) Los Angeles, California, U.S.
- Party: Democratic
- Spouse: Alvin J. Ducheny (m. 1980)
- Education: Pomona College (BA); Southwestern Law School (JD)

Denise Moreno Ducheny (born March 21, 1952) is an American lawyer and former politician from California. She is a former California State Senator who represented Senate District 40, which includes southern San Diego County, part of Riverside County, and all of Imperial County. Ducheny is a Democrat. She lives with her husband, Al, in San Diego, California. She is now a senior policy advisor at the Center for U.S.-Mexican Studies at the University of California, San Diego.

== Background ==
Ducheny was born in Los Angeles, California. She graduated with a BA in History from Pomona College. She earned her JD in 1979 from Southwestern University School of Law. After graduation, she practiced law from 1979 in south San Diego, California. Ducheny served on the San Diego Community College Board from 1990 to 1994.

== State Assembly ==
Ducheny served as chair of the California State Assembly in 1994 to 2000. She was the first San Diegan, first woman, and first Latino ever to be appointed to this powerful position overseeing the state's $100 billion spending plan. While in the Assembly, Ducheny served as Chair of the Assembly Budget Committee between 1997 and 2000, and as Vice-Chair in 1996. She also served as Chair of the Select Committee on California-Mexico Affairs, Co-Chair of the Special Committee on Welfare Reform, Vice-Chair of the Joint Legislative Budget Committee, and Vice-Chair of the Latino Legislative Caucus.

Ducheny served on numerous committees and authored landmark legislation, including the CAL Works Welfare Reform Act of 1997, which assisted many in the transition from welfare to work; the College Affordability Act, which rolled back student fees at the University of California, California State University, and Community Colleges for the first time in 13 years; the Reverse Mortgage bill, which provided protection to senior homeowners and consumers; the California Public School Library Act, which provided an additional funding source for school libraries; the Indian Child Welfare Act; the California development certificate to teach K-12 students; and legislation regarding vacant residential structures, which enabled local government to rehabilitate vacant dwellings to improve the quality of life in their communities.

== State Senate ==
Ducheny was first elected to represent the 40th District in the California State Senate in November 2002. She chaired the Senate Budget and Fiscal Review Committee and the Joint Legislative Budget Committee. She served as Vice Chair of the Agriculture Committee, was a member of the Joint Legislative Audit Committee, and chairs the Select Committees on California-Mexico Cooperation and Oversight of the UC Energy Labs.

She has been a strong advocate of a so-far unsuccessful effort to repeal California's mandatory motorcycle helmet law.

== 2012 House of Representatives elections ==
In the 2012 congressional elections, Ducheny announced that she would run against Democrat Juan Vargas.

Vargas spent some of his funds on mailers to help Republican Michael Crimmins, who he preferred to face in the general election in this heavily Democratic seat. Vargas spent $40–50,000 helping Crimmins, at least eight times more than Crimmins spent himself.

== 2014 appointment to Border Environment Cooperation Commission ==
In 2014, Ducheny was appointed to the board of directors for the Border Environment Cooperation Commission by President Barack Obama.
