= Peter R. Chacon =

American politician

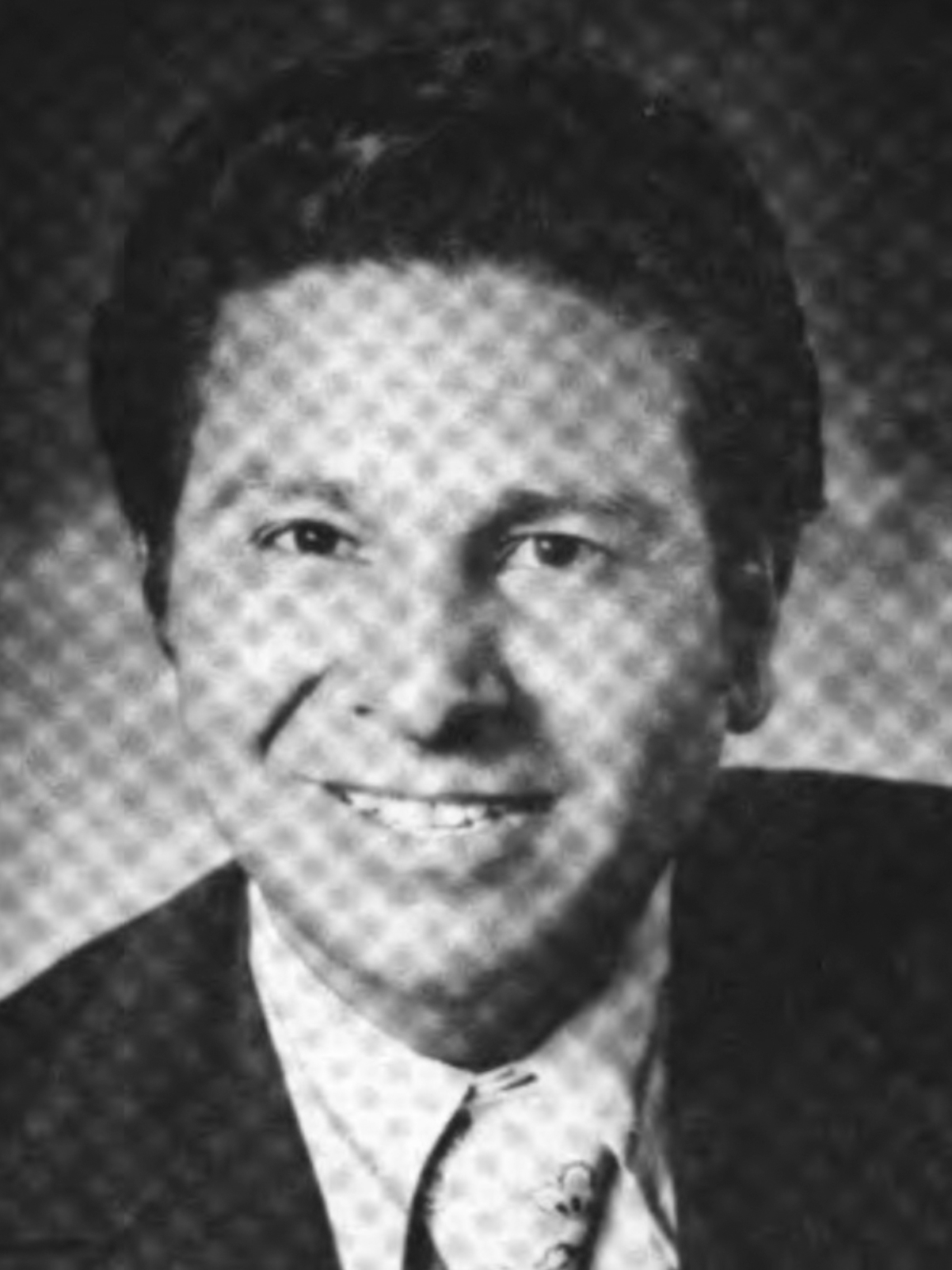
- Official portrait, 1975

Member of the California State Assembly from the 79th district
- In office January 4, 1971 – November 30, 1992
- Preceded by: Tom Hom
- Succeeded by: Stephen Peace

Personal details
- Born: June 10, 1925 Phoenix, Arizona, U.S.
- Died: December 14, 2014 (aged 89) San Diego, California, U.S.
- Party: Democratic
- Spouse: Jean Louise Picone (m. 1953)
- Children: 4
- Education: San Diego State University

Military service
- Branch/service: United States Army
- Battles/wars: World War II

Peter Robert Chacon (June 10, 1925 – December 14, 2014) served in the California State Assembly for the 79th district from 1971 to 1992.

== Early life and education ==
He enlisted in the United States Army Air Forces from 1943 to 1945 and served in Germany during World War II. He attended San Diego Community College and received a Bachelor of Arts and a master's of school administration from San Diego State University.
