= Stephen Peace =

American filmmaker and politician (born 1953)

Steve Peace
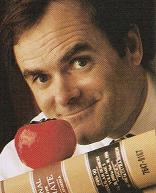

Member of the California Senate from the 40th district
- In office January 10, 1994 – November 30, 2002
- Preceded by: Wadie P. Deddeh
- Succeeded by: Denise Moreno Ducheny

Member of the California State Assembly from the 79th district
- In office December 7, 1992 – January 10, 1994
- Preceded by: Peter R. Chacon
- Succeeded by: Denise Moreno Ducheny

Member of the California State Assembly from the 80th district
- In office December 6, 1982 – November 30, 1992
- Preceded by: Wadie P. Deddeh
- Succeeded by: Julie Bornstein

Personal details
- Born: James Stephen Peace; March 30, 1953 (age 73) San Diego, California, U.S.
- Party: Democratic
- Spouse: Cheryl (m. 1974)
- Children: 3
- Education: University of California, San Diego (Bachelor of Arts)

James Stephen Peace (born March 30, 1953) is an American filmmaker, actor, and former politician. A member of the Democratic Party, Peace served in the California State Assembly from 1982 to 1994 and in the California State Senate from 1994 to 2002. He is also known for co-creating the Attack of the Killer Tomatoes film franchise.

== Early life and education ==
James Stephen Peace was born in San Diego, California to two teachers. He attended Bonita Vista High School, where he played football and basketball and was president of the student body. He attended the University of California, Davis and the University of California, San Diego, majoring in political science.

== Film career ==
Peace's film credits include the Killer Tomatoes series: Attack of the Killer Tomatoes (actor, producer, writer), Return of the Killer Tomatoes! (actor, producer, writer), Killer Tomatoes Strike Back (actor, producer), and Killer Tomatoes Eat France (producer, writer). He also produced, wrote, and acted in the 1987 film Happy Hour.

== Political career ==
Peace got his start in politics as a protégé of State Senator Wadie Deddeh and Assemblyman Larry Kapiloff. He served in the California State Assembly from 1982–1992 and the California Senate from 1993–2002.

In 2000 and 2001, then-Senator Peace authored the first laws in the nation aimed at protecting the privacy of individuals' personal information by requiring companies to inform consumers of data breaches. Senate Bill 129 also created the Office of Privacy Protection within the Department of Consumer Affairs to inform the public of potential options for protecting their privacy, receive complaints concerning persons unlawfully using others' personal information, and help prosecute identity theft and other privacy-related crimes.

Peace was the chairman of the Senate Committee on Energy from 1995–1997. During this time, the Electricity deregulation bill, AB 1890, was passed and signed into law by Governor Pete Wilson. The author was Jim Brulte, a Republican from Rancho Cucamonga. Many believed this bill led to the California electricity crisis of 2000 and 2001. Peace was listed as a "principal co-author" of the bill.

At the time, several prominent California newspapers came out in support of AB 1890, including the San Jose Mercury News. An editorial from 1996 supported the measures taken by the legislature at the time:

Last year, the California Public Utilities Commission rolled out a plan to turn electric power monopolies into free-market competitors. It was a flickering bulb. A half-dozen legislators and their staffs burned the midnight oil this summer to improve it. What they have produced glows brightly. Their plan protects residential and small business customers; it treats public and investor-owned utilities fairly; it maintains important social programs such as energy efficiency and assistance.

The "Steve Peace Death March" (over 200 hours of televised public hearings), produced a measure that passed both houses without any opposing votes. Afterwards, the California market collapsed. The consensus at the time was that the collapse was the result of flawed market design and consumer price caps included in AB1890. The resulting 2000–01 California electricity crisis was enough to cause him to abandon a possible run for California Secretary of State.

In the years after the energy crisis, successful legal challenges and information about market abuse by Enron and claims of ineffective federal oversight by the Federal Energy Regulatory Commission emerged, which Peace, asserts “proved” that the crisis was not a result of his energy bill, but rather companies taking advantage of deregulation to manipulate the market and consumers.

After being term-limited out of the State Senate, he served as Director of the California Department of Finance.

=== Later work ===
After leaving public service, Peace served as Senior Advisor to JMI Inc., the San Diego Padres and former Padres owner John Moores from 2005 to December 2016. He also served as a Founding Director of the California Independent Voter Project during which time he wrote California's Nonpartisan Open Primary Constitutional Amendment which enacted a Nonpartisan blanket primary. He has served on the Board of the UCSD Scripps Institute of Oceanography and as Chairman of the Board of Chicago-based, Authentify, Inc., the privately held company that pioneered dual authentication security for online financial transactions. He currently serves as Chairman of the Board of Killer Tomatoes Entertainment and as a member of the Board of Directors of Preservation Ranch. He is a principal in the consulting firm JSPeace and Associates.

==== Presidential endorsements ====
Peace endorsed Hillary Clinton in 2016 and Amy Klobuchar in the 2020 presidential election. However, in 2024, he crossed the party line and endorsed independent Robert F. Kennedy Jr. for the presidency.

== Trivia ==
- In a Killer Tomatoes DVD making fun of "Where are they now?", Peace was shown wearing a suit and walking into the California Senate with an open parachute attached to his back, spoofing his Killer Tomatoes character Wilbur Finletter, who was usually seen dragging an open parachute in the same manner.
