= LaShae Sharp-Collins =

American educator and politician

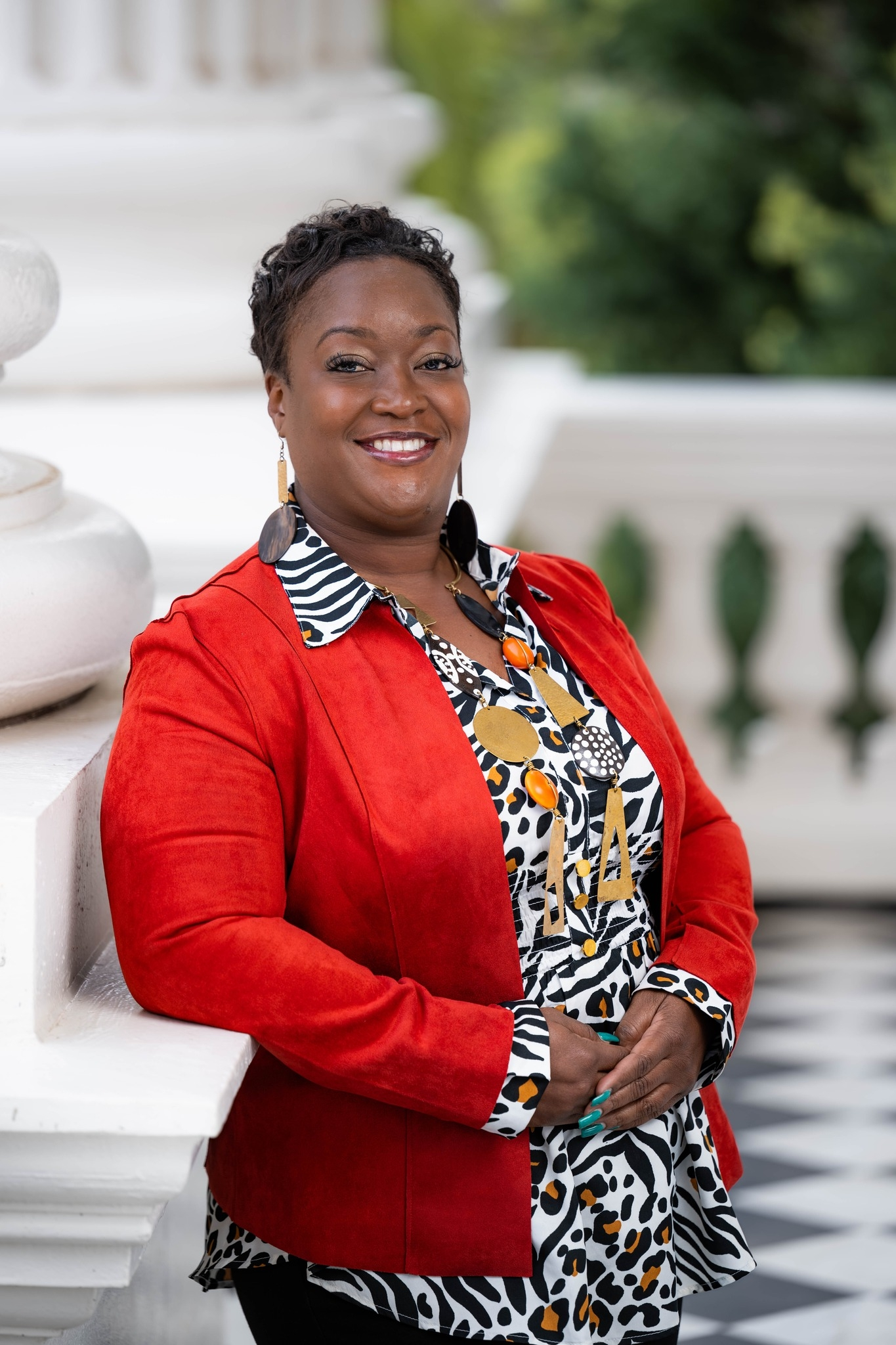
- Official portrait, 2024

Member of the California State Assembly from the 79th district
- Incumbent
- Assumed office December 2, 2024
- Preceded by: Akilah Weber

Personal details
- Born: 1979 or 1980 (age 45–46) San Diego, California
- Party: Democratic
- Education: San Diego State University: (BA; M.Ed.; Ed.D)
- Website: Campaign website

LaShae Sharp-Collins (born 1979/1980) is an American educator and politician who is a member of the California State Assembly representing the 79th district. A Democrat, she previously worked as a professor at San Diego State University.

== Early life and education ==
Sharp-Collins was born and raised in San Diego and graduated from Lincoln High School. She graduated from San Diego State University with a Bachelor of Arts in Africana studies, a master's degree in education, and a Doctor of Education.

== Career ==
Sharp-Collins went on to work as an adjunct professor in the Department of Africana studies at San Diego State University, where she was a member of the California Faculty Association. In 2022, students of her course expressed their discomfort on social media about an assignment asking them to create a "slave narrative" and act like an enslaved persona.

She worked as a Community Engagement Specialist for the San Diego County Office of Education, creating curriculum and reaching out to parents. She also worked as the district Director for Shirley Weber.

== California State Assembly ==
Sharp-Collins ran for the California State Assembly in 2024 to succeed incumbent Akilah Weber, who ran for the California State Senate. She faced La Mesa City Councilman Colin Parent in the general election and was endorsed by the California Democratic Party, Toni Atkins, and Shirley Weber.

== Electoral history ==
2024 California State Assembly 79th district election
Primary election
Party	Candidate	Votes	%
Democratic	Colin Parent	21,992	39.6
Democratic	LaShae Sharp-Collins	16,854	30.3
Democratic	Racquel Vasquez	16,733	30.1
Total votes		55,579	100.0
General election
Democratic	LaShae Sharp-Collins	79,215	54.0
Democratic	Colin Parent	67,390	46.0
Total votes		146,605	100.0
Democratic hold			
