= Juan Vargas =

American politician (born 1961)

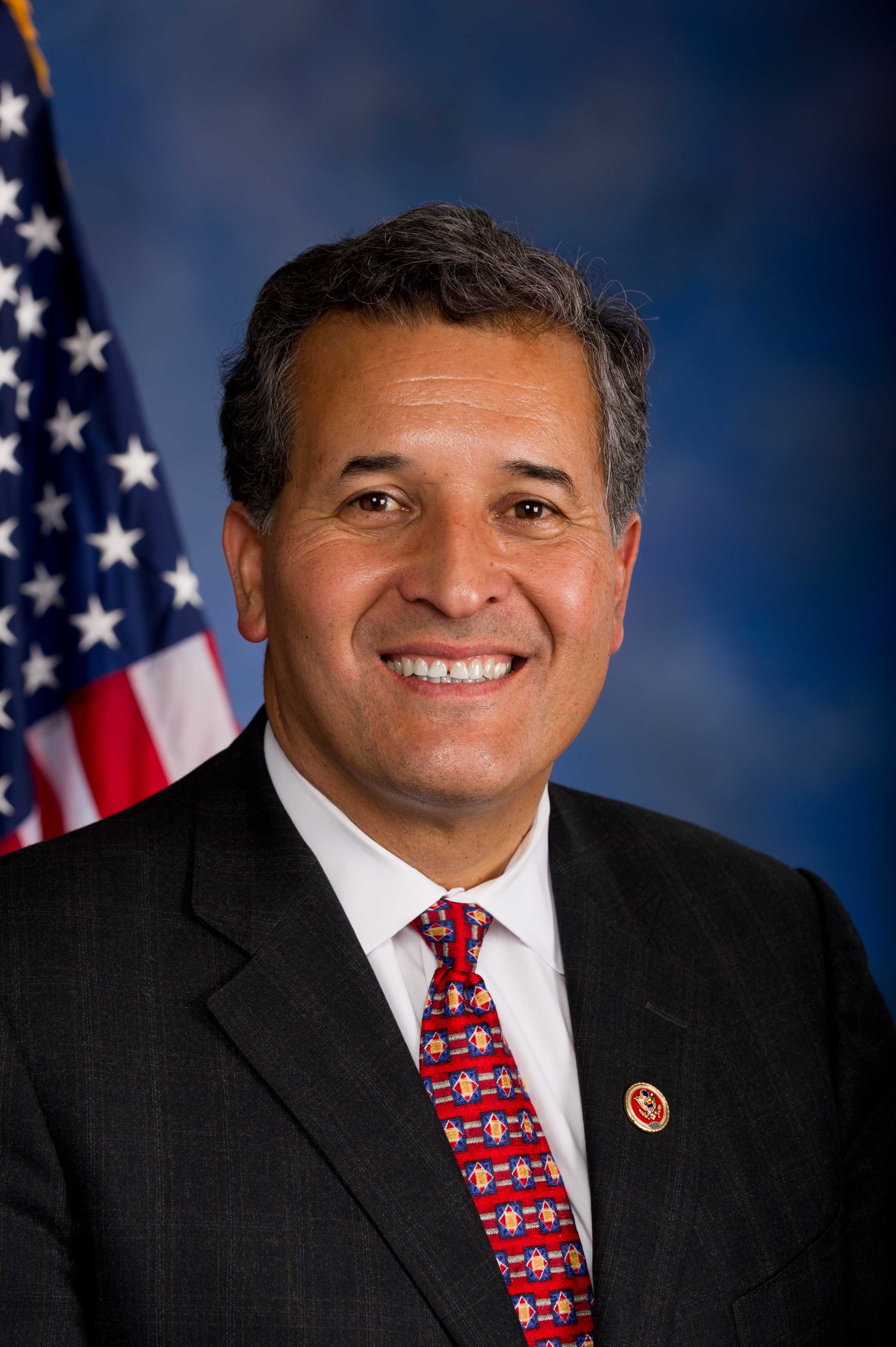
- Official portrait, 2013

Member of the U.S. House of Representatives from California
- Incumbent
- Assumed office January 3, 2013
- Preceded by: Bob Filner
- Constituency: 51st district (2013–2023); 52nd district (2023–present)

Member of the California State Senate from the 40th district
- In office December 6, 2010 – January 2, 2013
- Preceded by: Denise Moreno Ducheny
- Succeeded by: Ben Hueso

Member of the California State Assembly from the 79th district
- In office December 4, 2000 – November 30, 2006
- Preceded by: Denise Moreno Ducheny
- Succeeded by: Mary Salas

Member of San Diego City Council from the 8th district
- In office February 22, 1993 – December 4, 2000
- Preceded by: Bob Filner
- Succeeded by: Ralph Inzunza

Personal details
- Born: Juan Carlos Vargas; March 7, 1961 (age 65) National City, California, U.S.
- Party: Democratic
- Spouse: Adrienne D'Ascoli (m. 1990)
- Children: 2
- Education: University of San Diego (BA); Fordham University (MA); Harvard University (JD)
- Website: House website Campaign website

Juan Carlos Vargas (born March 7, 1961) is an American businessman and politician who has been a U.S. representative for California since 2013. His district includes the southernmost portions of San Diego County.

Vargas previously served as a Democratic member in the California State Senate representing the 40th district, the California State Assembly representing the 79th district, and the San Diego City Council.

== Early life and education ==
Vargas was born on a chicken ranch in National City, California, where he grew up very poor. He is the third of ten children of Tomas and Celina Vargas, who immigrated to the United States from Mexico in the late 1940s as part of the Bracero program. Vargas graduated magna cum laude with a BA from the University of San Diego and earned an MA in humanities from Fordham University.

After college, Vargas joined the Jesuit Novitiate in Santa Barbara. In the Jesuits, Vargas served in an orphanage in El Salvador's civil-war-torn jungles. After leaving the Jesuits, he attended law school, graduating in 1991 with a JD from Harvard Law School.

== Early political career (1992–2000) ==
=== 1992 congressional election ===
In 1992, Vargas ran in the newly created 50th congressional district, based in San Diego. He lost the Democratic primary, ranking fourth with 19% of the vote. Bob Filner won the primary with a plurality of 26% and went on to win the election.

=== San Diego City Council ===
Vargas served on the San Diego City Council from 1993 to 2000. While on the council, he created "Operation Restore" to employ homeless people to remove graffiti and to rehabilitate homes.

=== 1996 congressional election ===
In 1996, Vargas challenged Filner in the Democratic primary. Vargas wouldn't debate Filner, so the incumbent instead sparred with a life-sized Vargas cardboard cutout. Vargas said he agreed with Filner on "99 percent" of issues. Filner defeated him 55%–45%.

== California State Assembly (2000–2007) ==
=== Elections ===
In 2000, Vargas ran in California's 79th State Assembly district. He defeated Republican Jon Parungao 77%–19%. In 2002, he defeated Republican Mark Fast 66%–30%. In 2004, he defeated Libertarian Eli Wallace Conroe 85%–15%.

=== Tenure ===
In his first year in the Assembly, Vargas was appointed Assistant Majority Leader. He authored AB 188, legislation that bans smoking in children's playgrounds. He also introduced legislation aimed at protecting children from arcade video games, and authored legislation to mandate life sentences for people who commit violent sex crimes against children, which served as a model for Chelsea's Law.

=== Committee assignments ===
- Business and Professions
- Insurance (chair)

=== 2006 congressional election ===
In 2006, Vargas challenged Filner a third time, this time in California's 51st congressional district. He accused Filner of being a part of the culture of corruption of Washington, pointing out that Filner had paid his wife more than $500,000 in campaign funds for consulting services performed from their condominium in Washington. Filner argued that Vargas had controversial payments to his brother-in-law, who was a lobbyist for realtors. Filner defeated Vargas 51%–43%, with Danny Ramirez getting 6% of the vote.

== Business career (2007–2009) ==
After leaving the State Assembly in 2006 due to term limits, Vargas took a job with a home, auto and small business insurance company, where he was tasked with creating jobs and outreach in diverse San Diego communities as part of the company's diversity initiative. He left that job at the end of 2009 to run as a Democratic candidate for the California State Senate.

== California State Senate (2010–2013) ==
=== 2010 election ===
In 2010, Vargas narrowly won a seat in the California's 40th State Senate district, defeating Assemblywoman Mary Salas by 22 votes after recounts in San Diego and Riverside counties. He resigned from the Senate effective January 2, 2013, to take his seat in Congress. A special election to fill his seat was held in March 2013.

=== Committee assignments ===
Standing committees

- Banking & Financial Institutions (chair)
- Agriculture
- Business, Professions, and Economic Development
- Education
- Public Employment and Retirement

Subcommittee

- Education: Sustainable School Facilities

Joint Committee

- Rules

Select Committee

- Recovery, Reform, and Re-Alignment

== U.S. House of Representatives (2013–present) ==
=== 2012 election ===
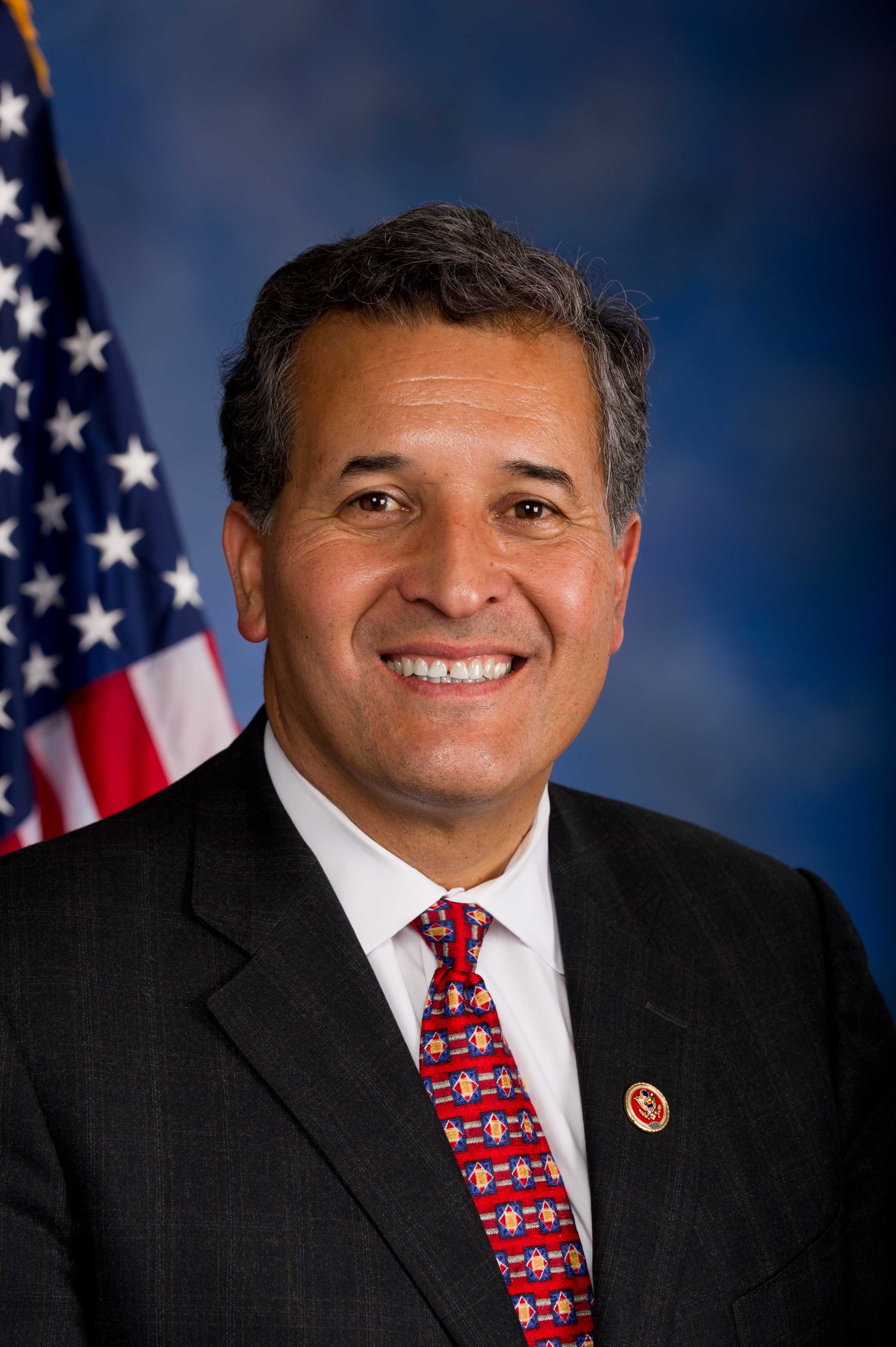
Vargas in 2013

In 2012, when Filner announced he would retire from Congress to run for mayor of San Diego, Vargas endorsed him despite their history of bitter rivalry. Vargas then ran for Filner's seat in the 51st district. In the open primary, he ranked first with 46% of the vote. Republican Michael Crimmins ranked second with 20%, Democratic state senator Denise Moreno Ducheny third with 15%, and four other candidates received single-digit percentages. In November, he defeated Crimmins 71%–29%.

=== 2020 election ===
In 2019, Vargas spent $124,200 of campaign money on photography, printing, postage, mailing and shipping of holiday cards that he sent to constituents.

=== Tenure ===
Vargas was sworn in on January 3, 2013. In 2015, he and his wife, Adrienne, spent five days in Berlin and Elmau, Germany. The trip was paid for by Robert Bosch Stiftung and the German Marshall Fund and cost $18,200. Part of Vargas's congressional work, the trip was to help him develop "a greater understanding of the key legislative topics of the 114th Congress through our [Germany and the United States] transatlantic relationship."

In 2022, Vargas was one of 16 Democrats to vote against the Merger Filing Fee Modernization Act of 2022, an antitrust package that would crack down on corporations for anti-competitive behavior.

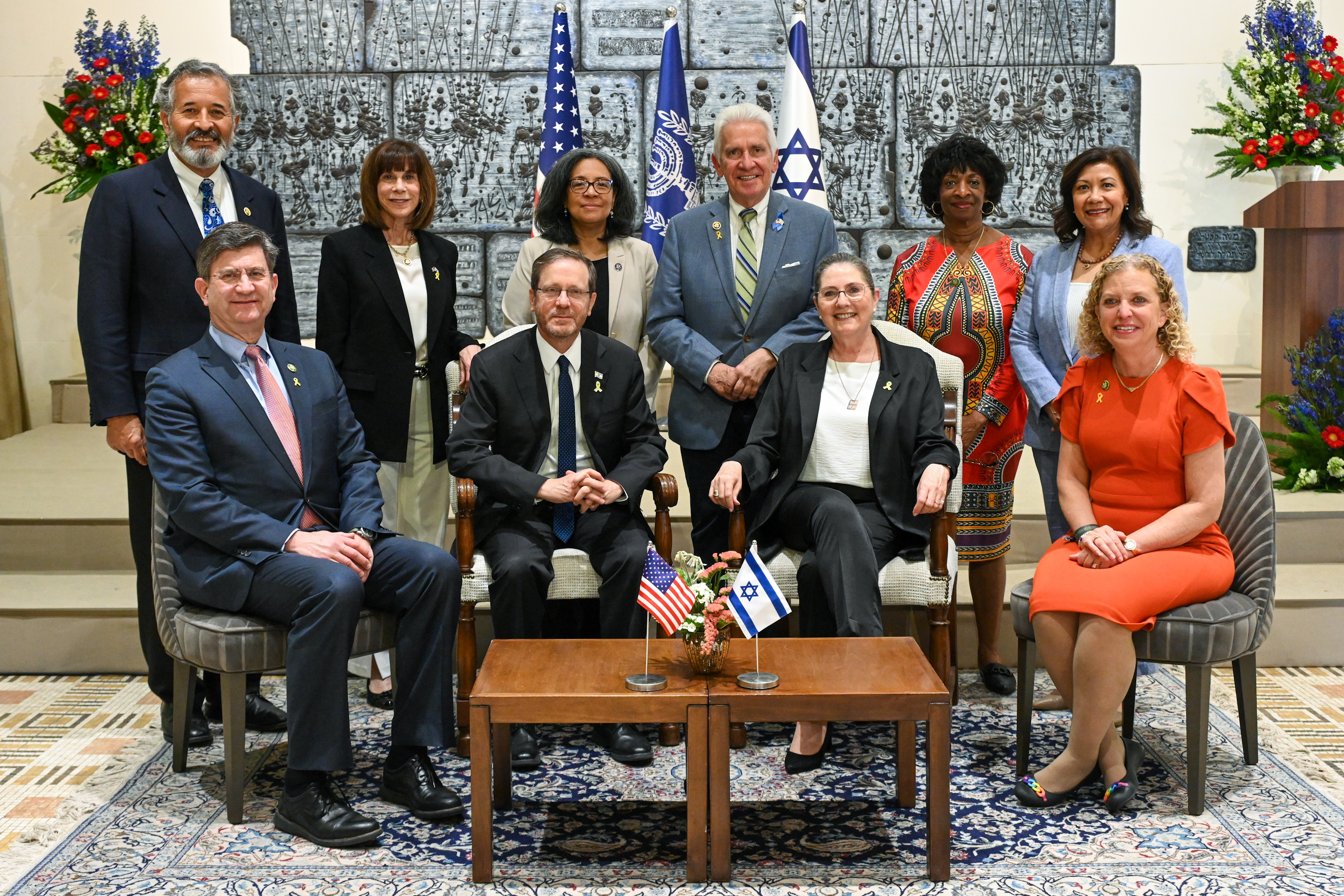
Vargas and other members of the US Congress with Israeli President Isaac Herzog in Jerusalem, March 28, 2024

He voted in favor of a bill that provided an additional $14.3 billion to support Israeli military operations in the Gaza Strip.

=== Committee assignments ===
For the 119th Congress:

- Committee on Financial Services
  - Subcommittee on Capital Markets
  - Subcommittee on Financial Institutions and Monetary Policy
  - Subcommittee on National Security, Illicit Finance and International Financial Institutions

=== Caucus memberships ===
- Congressional Asian Pacific American Caucus
- New Democrat Coalition
- Congressional Hispanic Caucus
- Climate Solutions Caucus
- Congressional Progressive Caucus
- Congressional Caucus on Turkey and Turkish Americans
- Congressional Equality Caucus
- Rare Disease Caucus

== Political positions ==
Vargas has a 100% rating from NARAL Pro-Choice America and an F grade from the Susan B. Anthony List for his abortion-related voting record. He opposed the overturning of Roe v. Wade, calling it "fundamentally wrong and extremely disappointing, impacting millions of women across the country."

In 2023, Vargas was among 56 Democrats to vote in favor of H.Con.Res. 21 which directed President Joe Biden to remove U.S. troops from Syria within 180 days.

In February 2025, Vargas joined a protest against Donald Trump's immigration policies led by religious leaders including Cardinal Robert McElroy, the Bishop of San Diego and Archbishop-designate of the Archdiocese of Washington.

In March 2026, Vargas was one of just four House Democrats who voted against the Massie-Khanna war powers resolution which required authorization from Congress for the 2026 Iran war.

== Personal life ==
Vargas and his wife, Adrienne, have two daughters.

During the 1999 armed conflict in Kosovo, Vargas welcomed a Kosovar refugee family into his family's home for nearly two years.

He had a cameo in the 2023 movie Dumb Money.

== See also ==
- List of Hispanic and Latino Americans in the United States Congress

U.S. House of Representatives
Preceded by Bob Filner	Member of the U.S. House of Representatives from California's 51st congressional district 2013–2023	Succeeded by Sara Jacobs
Preceded by Scott Peters	Member of the U.S. House of Representatives from California's 52nd congressional district 2023–present	Incumbent
U.S. order of precedence (ceremonial)
Preceded by Mark Takano	United States representatives by seniority 114th	Succeeded by Marc Veasey
