= California's 79th State Assembly district =

American legislative district

Current assemblymember
LaShae Sharp-Collins; D–San Diego
- Population (2010) • Voting age • Citizen voting age: 466,416; 351,301; 283,225
- Demographics: 33.47% White; 10.97% Black; 33.83% Latino; 18.96% Asian; 0.58% Native American; 0.82% Hawaiian/Pacific Islander; 0.26% other; 1.10% remainder of multiracial
- Registered voters: 281,241
- Registration: 44.75% Democratic; 22.03% Republican; 26.96% No party preference

California's 79th State Assembly district is one of 80 California State Assembly districts. It is currently represented by Democrat LaShae Sharp-Collins of San Diego.

== District profile ==
The district encompasses southeastern San Diego and its closest eastern suburbs. The ethnically and socioeconomically diverse district is a mix of urban and suburban areas, with density roughly proportional to the distance from downtown San Diego.

San Diego County – 15.1%

- Bonita
- Chula Vista – 36.4%
- La Mesa
- Lemon Grove
- National City – 27.1%
- San Diego – 19.9%

== Election results from statewide races ==
Year	Office	Results
2021	Recall	No 64.5 – 35.5%
2020	President	Biden 65.6 – 32.3%
2018	Governor	Newsom 63.6 – 36.4%
2018	Senator	Feinstein 55.4 – 44.6%
2016	President	Clinton 64.2 – 30.0%
2016	Senator	Harris 57.0 – 43.0%
2014	Governor	Brown 59.4 – 40.6%
2012	President	Obama 61.2 – 36.9%
2012	Senator	Feinstein 63.2 – 36.8%

== List of assembly members representing the district ==
Due to redistricting, the 79th district has been moved around different parts of the state. The current iteration resulted from the 2021 redistricting by the California Citizens Redistricting Commission.

Member	Party	Dates	Electoral history	Counties represented
Truman Reeves (San Bernardino)	Republican	January 5, 1885 – January 3, 1887	Redistricted from the 1st district and re-elected in 1894. [data missing]	San Bernardino
Hiram M. Barton (San Bernardino)	Democratic	January 3, 1887 – January 7, 1889	Elected in 1896. [data missing]	San Bernardino
Elmer W. Holmes (Riverside)	Republican	January 7, 1889 – January 5, 1891	Elected in 1888. [data missing]	San Bernardino
John C. Lynch (San Bernardino)	Republican	January 5, 1891 – January 2, 1893	Elected in 1890. Redistricted to the 78th district.	San Bernardino
William H. Carlson (San Diego)	Independent	January 2, 1893 – January 7, 1895	Elected in 1892. Retired to run for mayor of San Diego.	San Diego
Wilfred R. Guy (San Diego)	Republican	January 7, 1895 – January 2, 1899	Elected in 1894. Re-elected in 1896. [data missing]	San Diego
Lewis R. Works (San Diego)	Republican	January 2, 1899 – January 1, 1901	Elected in 1898. [data missing]	San Diego
Frank W. Barnes (San Diego)	Republican	January 1, 1901 – January 7, 1907	Elected in 1900. Re-elected in 1902. Re-elected in 1904. [data missing]	San Diego
W. F. Ludington (San Diego)	Republican	January 7, 1907 – January 4, 1909	Elected in 1906. [data missing]	San Diego
E. C. Hinkle (San Diego)	Republican	January 4, 1909 – January 4, 1915	Elected in 1908. Re-elected in 1910. Re-elected in 1912. [data missing]	San Diego
Grant Conard (San Diego)	Republican	January 4, 1915 – January 8, 1917	Elected in 1914. [data missing]	San Diego
Hugh J. Baldwin (National City)	Republican	January 8, 1917 – January 6, 1919	Elected in 1916. [data missing]	San Diego
Fred E. Lindley (San Diego)	Republican	January 6, 1919 – January 3, 1921	Elected in 1918. [data missing]	San Diego
James O. Bishop (San Diego)	Republican	January 3, 1921 – January 8, 1923	Elected in 1920. [data missing]	San Diego
P. A. Whitacre (San Diego)	Republican	January 8, 1923 – January 5, 1925	Elected in 1922. [data missing]	San Diego
Byron J. Walters (San Diego)	Republican	January 5, 1925 – January 7, 1929	Elected in 1924. Re-elected in 1926. [data missing]	San Diego
William E. Harper (San Diego)	Republican	January 7, 1929 – January 5, 1931	Elected in 1928. [data missing]	San Diego
Edwin L. Head (San Diego)	Republican	January 5, 1931 – January 2, 1933	Elected in 1930. Lost re-election.	San Diego
Bruce R. Stannard (San Diego)	Republican	January 2, 1933 – January 7, 1935	Elected in 1932. [data missing]	San Diego
Paul A. Richie (San Diego)	Democratic	January 7, 1935 – January 4, 1943	Elected in 1934. Re-elected in 1936. Re-elected in 1938. Re-elected in 1940. Lost re-election.	San Diego
Kathryn Niehouse (San Diego)	Republican	January 4, 1943 – January 3, 1955	Elected in 1942. Re-elected in 1944. Re-elected in 1946. Re-elected in 1948. Re-elected in 1950. Re-elected in 1952. [data missing]	San Diego
Wanda Sankary (San Diego)	Democratic	January 3, 1955 – January 7, 1957	Elected in 1954. Lost re-election.	San Diego
George G. Crawford (San Diego)	Republican	January 7, 1957 – February 15, 1960	Elected in 1956. Re-elected in 1958. Resigned.	San Diego
Vacant		February 15, 1960 – November 30, 1960		San Diego
George J. Lapthorne (San Diego)	Democratic	November 30, 1960 – January 2, 1961	Elected to finish Crawford's term. Not a candidate for the next election.	San Diego
James R. Mills (Coronado)	Democratic	January 2, 1961 – January 2, 1967	Elected in 1960. Re-elected in 1962. Re-elected in 1964. Redistricted to the 40th district.	San Diego
Frederick James Bear (Chula Vista)	Democratic	January 2, 1967 – January 6, 1969	Elected in 1966. Lost re-election.	San Diego
Tom Hom (San Diego)	Republican	January 6, 1969 – January 4, 1971	Elected in 1968. Lost re-election.	San Diego
Peter R. Chacon (San Diego)	Democratic	January 4, 1971 – November 30, 1992	Elected in 1970. Re-elected in 1972. Re-elected in 1974. Re-elected in 1976. Re-elected in 1978. Re-elected in 1980. Re-elected in 1982. Re-elected in 1984. Re-elected in 1986. Re-elected in 1988. Re-elected in 1990. Retired.	San Diego
Stephen Peace (Chula Vista)	Democratic	December 7, 1992 – January 10, 1994	Redistricted from the 80th district and re-elected in 1992. Resigned to become a California State Senator.	San Diego
Vacant		January 10, 1994 – April 14, 1994		San Diego
Denise M. Ducheny (San Diego)	Democratic	April 14, 1994 – November 30, 2000	Elected to finish Peace's term. Re-elected in 1994. Re-elected in 1996. Re-elected in 1998. Retired.	San Diego
Juan Vargas (San Diego)	Democratic	December 4, 2000 – November 30, 2006	Elected in 2000. Re-elected in 2002. Re-elected in 2004. Retired to run for U.S. House of Representatives.	San Diego
Mary Salas (Chula Vista)	Democratic	December 4, 2006 – November 30, 2010	Elected in 2006. Re-elected in 2008. Retired to run for California State Senate.	San Diego
Ben Hueso (San Diego)	Democratic	December 6, 2010 – November 30, 2012	Elected in 2010. Redistricted to the 80th district.	San Diego
Shirley Weber (San Diego)	Democratic	December 3, 2012 – January 28, 2021	Elected in 2012. Re-elected in 2014. Re-elected in 2016. Re-elected in 2018. Re-elected in 2020. Resigned to become Secretary of State of California.	San Diego
Vacant		January 28, 2021 – April 19, 2021		San Diego
Akilah Weber (La Mesa)	Democratic	April 19, 2021 – November 30, 2024	Elected to finish her mother's term. Re-elected in 2022. Retired to run for State Senate.	San Diego
LaShae Sharp-Collins (San Diego)	Democratic	December 2, 2024 – present	Elected in 2024.	San Diego

== Election results (1990-present) ==
=== 2024 ===
2024 California State Assembly 79th district election
Primary election
Party	Candidate	Votes	%
Democratic	Colin Parent	21,992	39.6
Democratic	LaShae Sharp-Collins	16,854	30.3
Democratic	Racquel Vasquez	16,733	30.1
Total votes		55,579	100.0
General election
Democratic	LaShae Sharp-Collins	79,215	54.0
Democratic	Colin Parent	67,390	46.0
Total votes		146,605	100.0
Democratic hold			

=== 2022 ===
2022 California State Assembly 79th district election
Primary election
Party	Candidate	Votes	%
Democratic	Akilah Weber (incumbent)	42,857	64.3
Republican	Corbin Sabol	16,651	25.0
Republican	John Moore	7,159	10.7
Total votes		66,667	100.0
General election
Democratic	Akilah Weber (incumbent)	67,674	63.9
Republican	Corbin Sabol	38,290	36.1
Total votes		105,964	100.0
Democratic hold			

=== 2021 (special) ===
2021 California State Assembly 79th district special election Vacancy resulting from the resignation of Shirley Weber
Primary election
Party	Candidate	Votes	%
Democratic	Akilah Weber	33,197	52.0
Republican	Marco Contreras	21,359	33.4
Democratic	Leticia Munguia	5,263	8.2
Democratic	Shane Suzanne Parmely	3,241	5.1
Democratic	Aeiramique Glass-Blake	818	1.3
Total votes		64,189	100.0
Democratic hold			

=== 2020 ===
2020 California State Assembly 79th district election
Primary election
Party	Candidate	Votes	%
Democratic	Shirley Weber (incumbent)	74,121	65.7
Republican	John Moore	19,619	17.4
Republican	Carmelita "C.L." Larrabaster	19,080	16.9
Total votes		112,820	100.0
General election
Democratic	Shirley Weber (incumbent)	147,994	65.4
Republican	John Moore	78,367	34.6
Total votes		226,361	100.0
Democratic hold			

=== 2018 ===
2018 California State Assembly 79th district election
Primary election
Party	Candidate	Votes	%
Democratic	Shirley Weber (incumbent)	51,395	63.7
Republican	John Moore	29,324	36.3
Total votes		80,719	100.0
General election
Democratic	Shirley Weber (incumbent)	103,533	66.8
Republican	John Moore	51,548	33.2
Total votes		155,081	100.0
Democratic hold			

=== 2016 ===
2016 California State Assembly 79th district election
Primary election
Party	Candidate	Votes	%
Democratic	Shirley Weber (incumbent)	64,395	67.7
Republican	John Moore	30,711	32.3
Total votes		95,106	100.0
General election
Democratic	Shirley Weber (incumbent)	114,080	65.2
Republican	John Moore	60,827	34.8
Total votes		174,907	100.0
Democratic hold			

=== 2014 ===
2014 California State Assembly 79th district election
Primary election
Party	Candidate	Votes	%
Democratic	Shirley Weber (incumbent)	35,886	99.7
American Independent	George R. Williams (write-in)	115	0.3
Total votes		36,001	100.0
General election
Democratic	Shirley Weber (incumbent)	49,264	61.9
American Independent	George R. Williams	30,266	38.1
Total votes		79,530	100.0
Democratic hold			

=== 2012 ===
2012 California State Assembly 79th district election
Primary election
Party	Candidate	Votes	%
Democratic	Shirley Weber	20,293	30.5
Republican	Mary England	19,313	29.1
Republican	Matt Mendoza	8,857	13.3
Democratic	Rudy Ramirez	7,533	11.3
Democratic	Patricia Ann Washington	5,401	8.1
Democratic	Sid Voorakkara	5,060	7.6
Total votes		66,457	100.0
General election
Democratic	Shirley Weber	94,170	61.7
Republican	Mary England	58,424	38.3
Total votes		152,594	100.0
Democratic hold			

=== 2010 ===
2010 California State Assembly 79th district election
Party	Candidate	Votes	%
Democratic	Ben Hueso	46,349	62.8
Republican	Derrick Roach	27,545	37.2
Total votes		73,894	100.0
Democratic hold			

=== 2008 ===
2008 California State Assembly 79th district election
Party	Candidate	Votes	%
Democratic	Mary Salas (incumbent)	74,051	69.5
Republican	Derrick Roach	32,526	30.5
Total votes		106,577	100.0
Democratic hold			

=== 2006 ===
2006 California State Assembly 79th district election
Party	Candidate	Votes	%
Democratic	Mary Salas	39,437	62.8
Republican	Jean Roesch	23,395	37.2
Total votes		62,832	100.0
Democratic hold			

=== 2004 ===
2004 California State Assembly 79th district election
Party	Candidate	Votes	%
Democratic	Juan Vargas (incumbent)	78,565	85.2
Libertarian	Eli Wallace Conroe	13,584	14.7
No party	Petra E. Barajas (write-in)	27	0.0
Total votes		92,176	100.0
Democratic hold			

=== 2002 ===
2002 California State Assembly 79th district election
Party	Candidate	Votes	%
Democratic	Juan Vargas (incumbent)	37,479	65.9
Republican	Mark W. Fast	17,195	30.2
Libertarian	Joshua Castro	2,268	3.9
Total votes		56,942	100.0
Democratic hold			

=== 2000 ===
2000 California State Assembly 79th district election
Party	Candidate	Votes	%
Democratic	Juan Vargas	55,689	77.4
Republican	Jon Parungao	13,708	19.0
Libertarian	Richard J. Cardulla	2,572	3.6
Total votes		71,969	100.0
Democratic hold			

=== 1998 ===
1998 California State Assembly 79th district election
Party	Candidate	Votes	%
Democratic	Denise Moreno Ducheny (incumbent)	39,636	76.4
Republican	Carl Hurum Kinz	12,226	23.6
Total votes		51,862	100.0
Democratic hold			

=== 1996 ===
1996 California State Assembly 79th district election
Party	Candidate	Votes	%
Democratic	Denise Moreno Ducheny (incumbent)	48,509	71.5
Republican	Bob Divine	19,338	28.5
Total votes		67,847	100.0
Democratic hold			

=== 1994 ===
1994 California State Assembly 79th district election
Party	Candidate	Votes	%
Democratic	Denise Moreno Ducheny (incumbent)	34,081	67.5
Republican	John Vogel	14,601	28.9
Peace and Freedom	Lasal Faten	1,835	3.6
Total votes		50,517	100.0
Democratic hold			

=== 1994 (special) ===
1994 California State Assembly 79th district special election Vacancy resulting from the resignation of Stephen Peace
Party	Candidate	Votes	%
Democratic	Denise Moreno Ducheny	5,150	29.9
Democratic	Tim Nader	5,122	29.7
Democratic	David Valladolid	3,790	22.0
Democratic	John E. Warren	2,470	14.3
Democratic	Lettie Rogers	705	4.1
Total votes		17,237	100.0
Democratic hold			

=== 1992 ===
1992 California State Assembly 79th district election
Party	Candidate	Votes	%
Democratic	Stephen Peace (incumbent)	46,739	65.2
Republican	Raul Silva-Martinez	19,855	27.7
Peace and Freedom	James R. Train	2,956	4.1
Peace and Freedom	Edwardo A. Prud-Home	2,103	2.9
Total votes		71,653	100.0
Democratic hold			

=== 1990 ===
1990 California State Assembly 79th district election
Party	Candidate	Votes	%
Democratic	Peter R. Chacon (incumbent)	31,538	56.4
Republican	Roger C. Covalt	20,340	36.4
Peace and Freedom	Dennis Terrill	4,043	7.2
Total votes		55,921	100.0
Democratic hold			

== See also ==
- California State Assembly
- California State Assembly districts
- Districts in California
