= Akilah Weber Pierson =

American politician (born 1978)

Akilah Weber
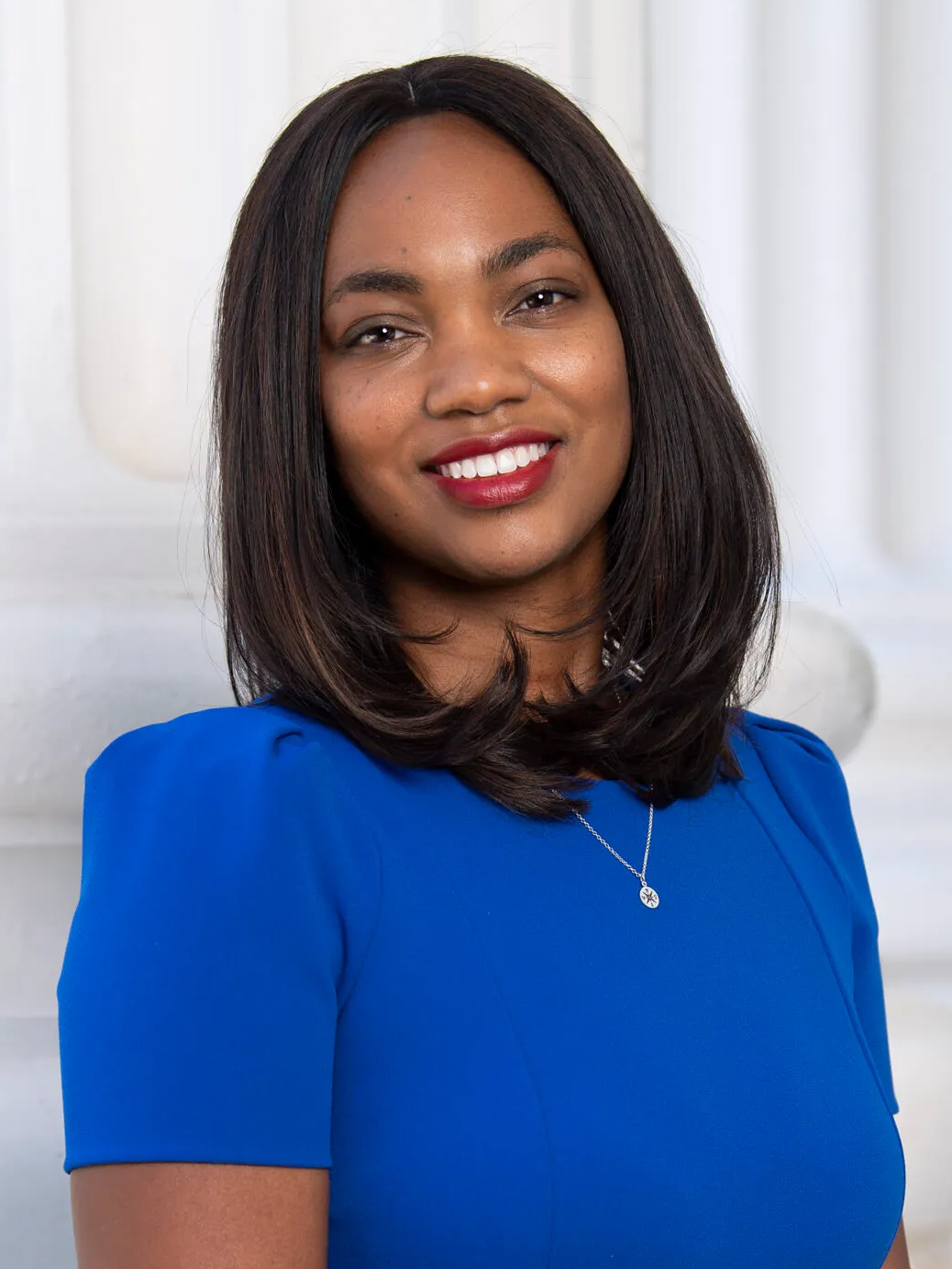
- Official portrait, 2021

Member of the California State Senate from the 39th district
- Incumbent
- Assumed office December 2, 2024
- Preceded by: Toni Atkins

Member of the California State Assembly from the 79th district
- In office April 19, 2021 – December 2, 2024
- Preceded by: Shirley Weber
- Succeeded by: LaShae Sharp-Collins

Personal details
- Born: Akilah Faizah Weber; July 2, 1978 (age 48) San Diego, California, U.S.
- Party: Democratic
- Spouse(s): Dennis Gakunga (divorced) Andrew Paul Pierson (m. 2024)
- Children: 2
- Parent: Shirley Weber (mother)
- Education: Xavier University of Louisiana (BS); University of Rochester (MD)
- Website: State senate website Campaign website

Akilah Faizah Weber Pierson (born July 2, 1978) is an American politician and physician serving as a member of the California State Senate since 2024. A member of the Democratic Party, she represents the 39th district, which includes parts of central San Diego as well as all of La Mesa, El Cajon, and Lemon Grove. She previously served in the California State Assembly from 2021 to 2024 as a representative of the 79th district. She is the daughter of California Secretary of State Shirley Weber, whom she succeeded in the Assembly after winning a special election in 2021.

== Early life and education ==
Weber was born and raised in Oak Park, San Diego. She earned a Bachelor of Science degree in biology from Xavier University of Louisiana and a Doctor of Medicine from the University of Rochester Medical Center.

== Career ==
After graduating from medical school, Weber completed a residency at the John H. Stroger Jr. Hospital of Cook County and a pediatric and adolescent gynecology fellowship at the Cincinnati Children's Hospital Medical Center. Weber is an OBGYN at Rady Children's Hospital.

In 2018, Weber was elected to the La Mesa City Council.

Weber was elected to the Assembly in a special election on April 6, 2021, to fill the vacancy of her mother, Shirley Weber, who resigned to become the Secretary of State of California. She was subsequently sworn in on April 19, 2021.

== Electoral history ==
=== 2021 ===
2021 California State Assembly 79th district special election
Party	Candidate	Votes	%
Democratic	Akilah Weber	33,197	52.0
Republican	Marco Contreras	21,359	33.4
Democratic	Leticia Munguia	5,263	8.2
Democratic	Shane Suzanne Parmely	3,241	5.1
Democratic	Aeiramique Glass Blake	818	1.3
Total votes		63,878	100.0
Democratic hold			

=== 2022 ===
2022 California State Assembly 79th district election
Primary election
Party	Candidate	Votes	%
Democratic	Akilah Weber (incumbent)	42,857	64.3
Republican	Corbin Sabol	16,651	25.0
Republican	John Moore	7,159	10.7
Total votes		66,667	100.0
General election
Democratic	Akilah Weber (incumbent)	67,674	63.9
Republican	Corbin Sabol	38,290	36.1
Total votes		105,964	100.0
Democratic hold			

=== 2024 ===
2024 California State Senate 39th district election
Primary election
Party	Candidate	Votes	%
Democratic	Akilah Weber	121,647	60.7
Republican	Bob Divine	78,637	39.3
Total votes		200,284	100.0
General election
Democratic	Akilah Weber	266,830	63.0
Republican	Bob Divine	156,616	37.0
Total votes		423,446	100.0
Democratic hold			
