= Shirley Weber =

American academic and politician (born 1948)

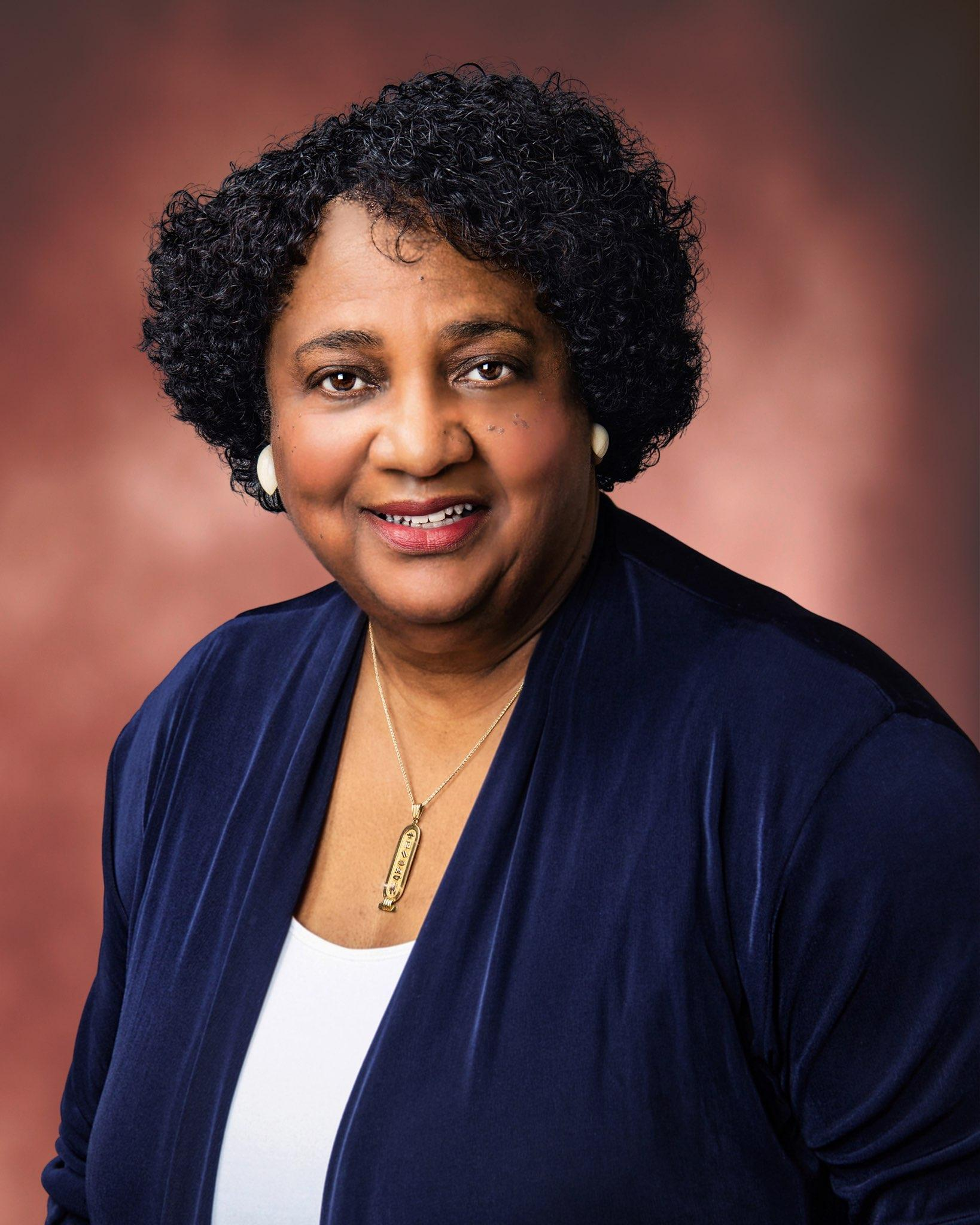
- Official portrait, 2021

30th Secretary of State of California
- Incumbent
- Assumed office January 29, 2021
- Governor: Gavin Newsom; Xavier Becerra (elect)
- Preceded by: Alex Padilla

Member of the California State Assembly from the 79th district
- In office December 3, 2012 – January 28, 2021
- Preceded by: Ben Hueso (redistricted)
- Succeeded by: Akilah Weber

Personal details
- Born: Shirley Nash; September 20, 1948 (age 78) Hope, Arkansas, U.S.
- Party: Democratic
- Spouse: Daniel Weber (m. 1973; died 2002)
- Children: 2, including Akilah
- Education: University of California, Los Angeles (BA, MA, PhD)
- Website: Office website Campaign website

Shirley Weber (née Nash; born September 20, 1948) is an American academic and politician serving as the secretary of state of California. She was previously a member of the California State Assembly for the 79th district, which includes portions of San Diego, Chula Vista, and National City and all of Lemon Grove and La Mesa.

Prior to being elected to the Assembly in 2012, Weber served on the San Diego Board of Education, and as a professor of African-American studies at San Diego State University. She is the first African American to have been elected to the California State Legislature south of Los Angeles.

In December 2020, Governor Gavin Newsom appointed Weber as California's secretary of state, succeeding Alex Padilla, whom he had appointed as California's junior United States senator. Weber is the first African American to serve as California's secretary of state and the fifth to serve in a statewide position. She was elected to a full four-year term in office in 2022 and reelected in 2026.

== Early life and education ==
Weber was born in Hope, Arkansas, and raised in Los Angeles. Her father was a farmer and left school after sixth grade but encouraged Weber and her seven siblings to prioritize their education. At three years old, she and her family fled their farm and moved west after her father refused to back down in a dispute with a white farmer and a lynch mob threatened his life. The family relocated to the Pueblo Del Rio housing projects in South Los Angeles where Weber grew up. She earned a Bachelor of Arts, Master of Arts, and PhD in communication from the University of California, Los Angeles.

== Career ==
=== Academics ===
Weber is a professor emerita of Africana studies at San Diego State University. She helped to establish that department in 1972 and became its chair, teaching there for 40 years. She was president of the National Council for Black Studies from 2002 to 2006.

=== Early political career ===
She served as a board member and later president of the San Diego Board of Education from 1988 to 1996. She also served as chairwoman of the San Diego Citizens’ Equal Opportunity Commission.

=== California State Assembly ===
In Fall 2011, she was recruited to run for office in the California State Assembly by Toni Atkins. In November 2012, Weber won election to the state assembly with 61.7% of the vote, defeating her Republican opponent, Mary England.

During her time in the assembly, Weber was a member of the California Assembly's Committee on Higher Education. She promoted the development of a state university location in Chula Vista as a satellite or extension campus of the California State University system. In 2020, Weber authored Assembly Bill 3121, which created a California Reparations Task Force to study how to redress slavery in California; the task force met for the first time in 2021.

=== California Secretary of State ===
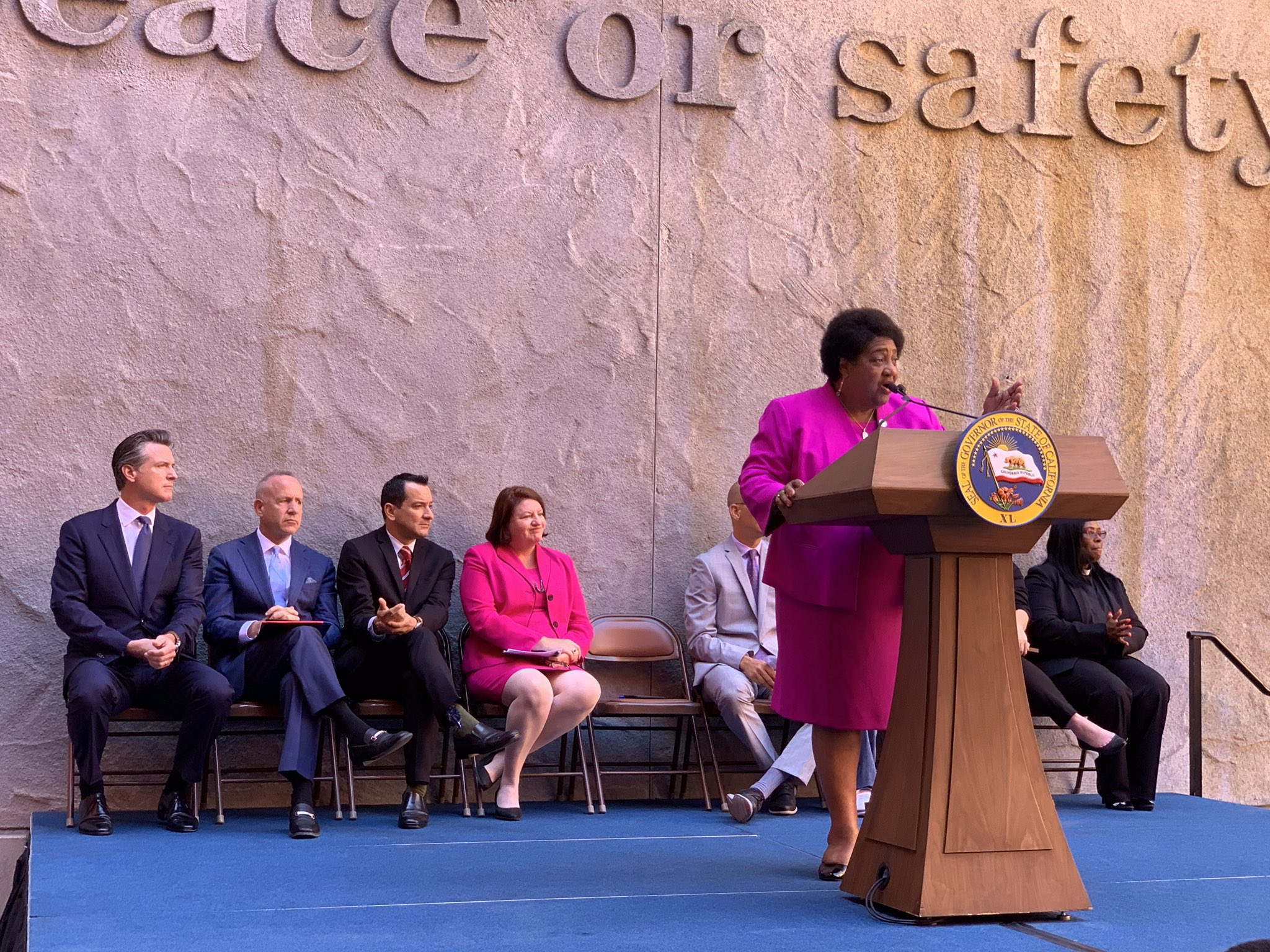
Weber speaks at the signing of the AB392 bill

On December 22, 2020, Governor Gavin Newsom appointed Weber to the position of secretary of state of California, effective upon confirmation by the California State Legislature, to replace Alex Padilla, whom he had just appointed to the United States Senate. Weber is the first African American to serve as secretary of state. Weber was sworn in on January 29, 2021, having been confirmed unanimously by the state senate the day before. As secretary of state, Weber played a central role in administering the 2021 California gubernatorial recall election that targeted Newsom. She won a full term in the 2022 election over businessman Rob Bernosky.

== Personal life ==
Weber's husband, San Diego County Superior Court Judge Daniel Weber, died in 2002. She has two children and three grandchildren. Her daughter, Akilah Weber, is a physician who served as a member of the La Mesa City Council from 2018 to 2021. On April 19, 2021, Akilah was sworn in by her mother to succeed her in the California State Assembly after winning in a special election, before being elected to the California State Senate in 2024.

== Electoral history ==
=== 2012 ===
2012 California State Assembly 79th district election
Primary election
| Party | Candidate | Votes | % |
|---|---|---|---|
| Democratic | Shirley Weber | 20,293 | 30.5 |
| Republican | Mary England | 19,313 | 29.1 |
| Republican | Matt Mendoza | 8,857 | 13.3 |
| Democratic | Rudy Ramirez | 7,533 | 11.3 |
| Democratic | Patricia Ann Washington | 5,401 | 8.1 |
| Democratic | Sid Voorakkara | 5,060 | 7.6 |
| Total votes | | 66,457 | 100.0 |
General election
| Democratic | Shirley Weber | 94,170 | 61.7 |
| Republican | Mary England | 58,424 | 38.3 |
| Total votes | | 152,594 | 100.0 |
| Democratic hold | | | |

=== 2014 ===
2014 California State Assembly 79th district election
Primary election
| Party | Candidate | Votes | % |
|---|---|---|---|
| Democratic | Shirley Weber (incumbent) | 35,886 | 99.7 |
| American Independent | George R. Williams (write-in) | 115 | 0.3 |
| Total votes | | 36,001 | 100.0 |
General election
| Democratic | Shirley Weber (incumbent) | 49,264 | 61.9 |
| American Independent | George R. Williams | 30,266 | 38.1 |
| Total votes | | 79,530 | 100.0 |
| Democratic hold | | | |

=== 2016 ===
2016 California State Assembly 79th district election
Primary election
| Party | Candidate | Votes | % |
|---|---|---|---|
| Democratic | Shirley Weber (incumbent) | 64,395 | 67.7 |
| Republican | John Moore | 30,711 | 32.3 |
| Total votes | | 95,106 | 100.0 |
General election
| Democratic | Shirley Weber (incumbent) | 114,080 | 65.2 |
| Republican | John Moore | 60,827 | 34.8 |
| Total votes | | 174,907 | 100.0 |
| Democratic hold | | | |

=== 2018 ===
2018 California State Assembly 79th district election
Primary election
| Party | Candidate | Votes | % |
|---|---|---|---|
| Democratic | Shirley Weber (incumbent) | 51,395 | 63.7 |
| Republican | John Moore | 29,324 | 36.3 |
| Total votes | | 80,719 | 100.0 |
General election
| Democratic | Shirley Weber (incumbent) | 103,533 | 66.8 |
| Republican | John Moore | 51,548 | 33.2 |
| Total votes | | 155,081 | 100.0 |
| Democratic hold | | | |

=== 2020 ===
2020 California State Assembly 79th district election
Primary election
| Party | Candidate | Votes | % |
|---|---|---|---|
| Democratic | Shirley Weber (incumbent) | 74,121 | 65.7 |
| Republican | John Moore | 19,619 | 17.4 |
| Republican | Carmelita "C.L." Larrabaster | 19,080 | 16.9 |
| Total votes | | 112,820 | 100.0 |
General election
| Democratic | Shirley Weber (incumbent) | 147,994 | 65.4 |
| Republican | John Moore | 78,367 | 34.6 |
| Total votes | | 226,361 | 100.0 |
| Democratic hold | | | |

=== 2022 ===
2022 California Secretary of State election
Primary election
| Party | Candidate | Votes | % |
|---|---|---|---|
| Democratic | Shirley Weber (incumbent) | 4,016,798 | 58.9 |
| Republican | Rob Bernosky | 1,281,587 | 18.8 |
| Republican | Rachel Hamm | 822,978 | 12.0 |
| Republican | James "JW" Paine | 254,222 | 3.7 |
| Green | Gary N. Blenner | 205,630 | 3.0 |
| Republican | Raul Rodriguez Jr. | 176,059 | 2.6 |
| No party preference | Matthew D. Cinquanta | 59,481 | 0.9 |
| No party preference | Desmond A. Silveira (write-in) | 235 | 0.0 |
| Total votes | | 6,816,990 | 100.0 |
General election
| Democratic | Shirley Weber (incumbent) | 6,462,164 | 60.1 |
| Republican | Rob Bernosky | 4,298,530 | 39.9 |
| Total votes | | 10,760,694 | 100.0 |
| Democratic hold | | | |

Political offices
| Preceded by James Schwab; Acting | Secretary of State of California; 2021–present | Incumbent |
