= John Stull =

American politician (1920–2011)

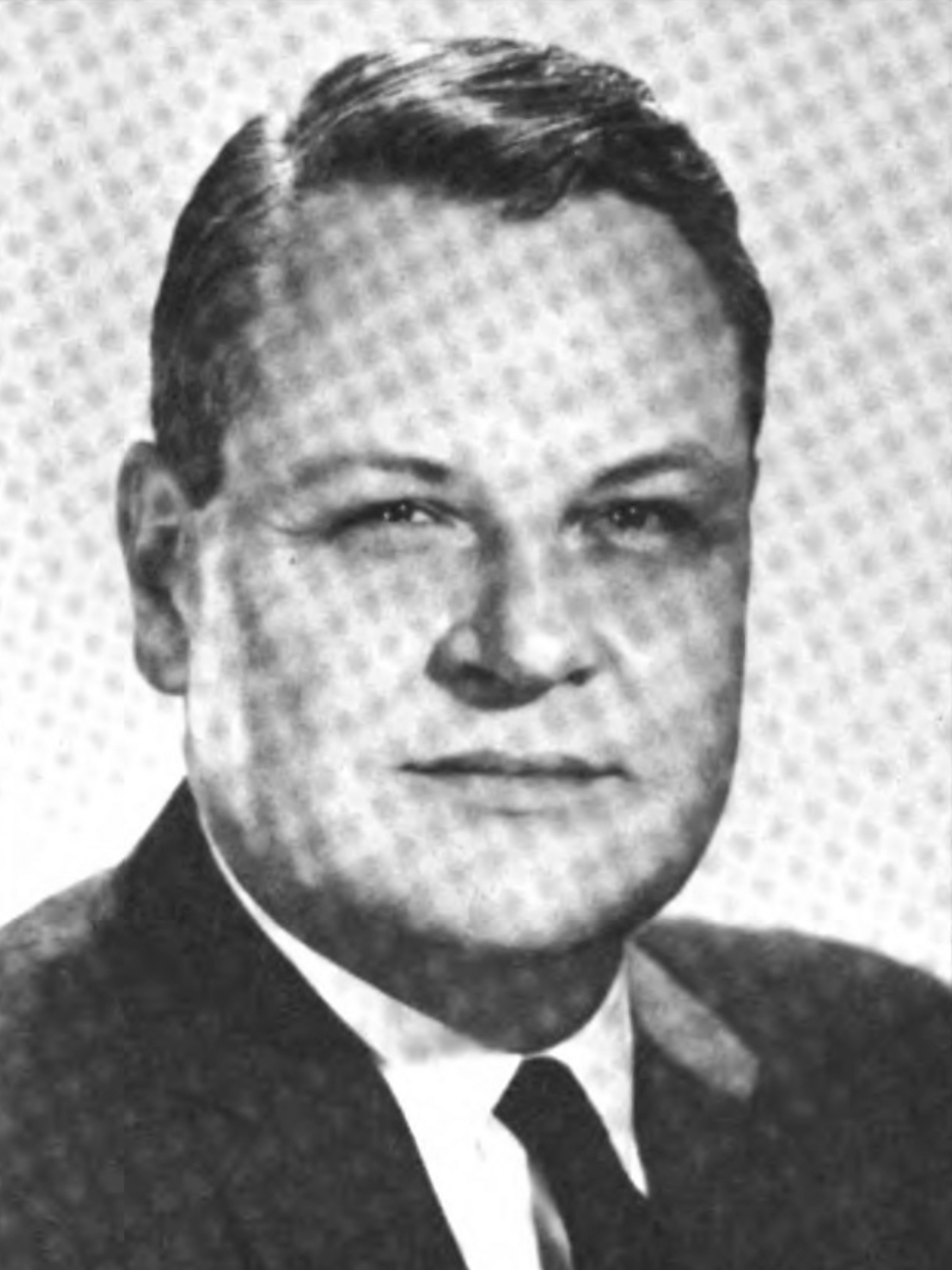
- Stull in 1967

Member of the California State Assembly from the 80th district
- In office January 2, 1967 – March 12, 1973
- Preceded by: Hale Ashcraft
- Succeeded by: Wadie P. Deddeh

Member of the California State Senate from the 38th district
- In office March 12, 1973 – November 30, 1978
- Preceded by: Clair Burgener
- Succeeded by: William A. Craven

Personal details
- Born: August 30, 1920 Corwith, Iowa, U.S.
- Died: June 8, 2011 (aged 90) Hartville, Missouri, U.S.
- Party: Republican
- Education: University of Iowa

John Stull (August 30, 1920 – June 8, 2011) was an American politician. He served as a Republican member for the 80th district of the California State Assembly. He also served as a member for the 38th district of the California State Senate.

== Life and career ==
Stull was born in Corwith, Iowa. He attended the University of Iowa and served in the United States Navy during World War II.

In 1966, Stull was elected to represent the 80th district of the California State Assembly, serving until 1973. In the same year, he was elected to represent the 38th district of the California State Senate, serving until 1978.

Stull died on June 8, 2011 in Hartville, Missouri, at the age of 88.
