= William A. Craven =

American politician (1921–1999)

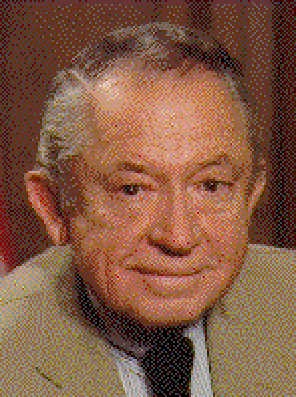

Member of the California Senate from the 38th district
- In office December 4, 1978 - November 30, 1998
- Preceded by: John Stull
- Succeeded by: Bill Morrow

Member of the California State Assembly from the 76th district
- In office December 2, 1974 - November 30, 1978
- Preceded by: Bob Wilson
- Succeeded by: Robert C. Frazee

Member of the California State Assembly from the 80th district
- In office July 16, 1973 - November 30, 1974
- Preceded by: John Stull
- Succeeded by: Wadie P. Deddeh

Personal details
- Born: June 30, 1921 Philadelphia, Pennsylvania, U.S.
- Died: July 11, 1999 (aged 78) San Diego, California, U.S.
- Party: Republican
- Spouse: Marion L. "Mimi" Wahl (m. 1944)
- Children: 2

Military service
- Branch/service: United States Marine Corps
- Battles/wars: World War II

William Anderson Craven (June 30, 1921 – July 11, 1999) served in the California State Assembly for the 80th district from 1973 to 1974, 76th district from 1974 to 1978 and served in the California State Senate from 1978 to 1998. During World War II he served in the United States Marine Corps. In 1970, Craven was elected to the San Diego County Board of Supervisors.
