= California Register of Historical Resources =

California historical preservation program

- Type of project: Online
- Location: California
- Owner: State Historical Resources Commission
- Website: California Register of Historical Resources

The California Register of Historical Resources is a California state government program for use by state and local agencies, private groups, and citizens to identify, evaluate, register, and protect California's historical resources.

The California Register program promotes the public acknowledgment and safeguarding of resources possessing architectural, historical, archaeological, and cultural significance. It plays a role in identifying historical resources for both state and local planning, assessing eligibility for state historic preservation grant funding, and providing specific protections under the California Environmental Quality Act.

== Criteria for Designation ==
- Connected to events that have significantly influenced the narratives of local or regional history, or the cultural heritage of California or the United States (Criterion 1)
- Linked to the lives of individuals who played crucial roles in local, California, or national history (Criterion 2).
- Exemplifies the unique features of a specific type, era, region, or construction method, or showcases the craftsmanship of a master or possesses notable artistic qualities (Criterion 3)
- Has produced, or has the potential to produce, valuable information relevant to the prehistory or history of the local area, California, or the nation (Criterion 4)

== Effects of Designation ==
- Partial safeguards: If a project poses a threat to the property, environmental assessment might be necessary under CEQA. It is advisable to reach out to your local planning agency for additional details
- The State Historical Building Code allows the local building inspector to approve alternative building codes
- The property owner may engage in a contract with the local assessor for a property tax reduction through the Mills Act. Owners have the option to install their own plaque or marker at the resource site

== See also ==
- National Register of Historic Places
- List of National Historic Landmarks in California
