= Julie Bornstein =

American politician (born 1948)

Member of the California State Assembly from the 80th district
- In office December 7, 1992 – November 30, 1994
- Preceded by: David G. Kelley, Steve Clute, Tricia Hunter
- Succeeded by: Jim Battin

Personal details
- Born: July 17, 1948 (age 78) San Diego, California, U.S.
- Party: Democratic
- Spouse: Steve Gordon (m. 1974-2014)
- Children: 2

Julie Bornstein (born July 17, 1948) is an American attorney and politician from California and a member of the Democratic Party.

Bornstein served as a member of the Desert Community College Board of Trustees from 1989 until 1992, when she was elected to the California State Assembly. She is Jewish.

== State Assembly ==
Previously numbered the 73rd, the new 80th Assembly district, had been redrawn during reapportionment and was open after incumbent David G. Kelley (R-Hemet) opted to instead run for State Senate. Initially Bornstein faced a primary challenge from sitting assemblyman Steve Clute (D-Riverside), whose old district had been dismantled and part of which wound up redrawn here. At the last minute, he chose to retire instead, though his name remained on the ballot. In the general election, Bornstein defeated incumbent assemblywoman Tricia Hunter (R-San Diego), who like Clute saw her old district split up by reapportionment and part of which ended up redrawn here.

Bornstein was awarded the prestigious "rookie of the year" from California Journal. Speaker Willie Brown elevated her to Democratic caucus chair, leading to speculation she was being groomed to be a future speaker. All this attention, and the fact that she represented a marginal seat made her the GOP's number one target for the 1994 elections. Even so, they failed to field a top-tier candidate after Hunter declined a rematch. In the 1994 election, the Republican Party did very well in California, and she lost to television advertising executive Jim Battin by 12 points, even though he was not initially seen as a threat.

== Other posts ==
After her stint in the legislature, Bornstein served as Chief of Staff for California Controller Kathleen Connell, as well as Chief Deputy Controller for External Affairs from 1997 until 1999. She was then appointed by Governor Gray Davis as Director of Housing and Community Development, a post she held from 1999 until 2004.

From 2004 to 2006, she served as president for the Campaign for Affordable Housing

== Congressional run ==
In 2008, Bornstein ran for the U.S. House of Representatives 45th district, then represented by Mary Bono (R-Palm Desert). Although that year saw big gains for Democrats, Bornstein scored just 41.7% of the vote against the incumbent.

== Electoral history ==
Member, California State Assembly: 1992–1994
Year	Office	Democrat	Votes	Pct	Republican	Votes	Pct
1992	California State Assembly; District 80	Julie Bornstein	56,760	49.6%	Tricia Hunter	55,971	49%
1994	California State Assembly; District 80	Julie Bornstein	41,671	43.7%	Jim Battin	53,794	56.3%
2008	United States House of Representatives; District 45	Julie Bornstein	111,026	41.7%	Mary Bono	155,166	58.3%

Political offices
Preceded by David G. Kelley	California State Assembly 80th District; December 7, 1992 – November 30, 1994	Succeeded by Jim Battin
