= Richard J. Donovan =

American politician

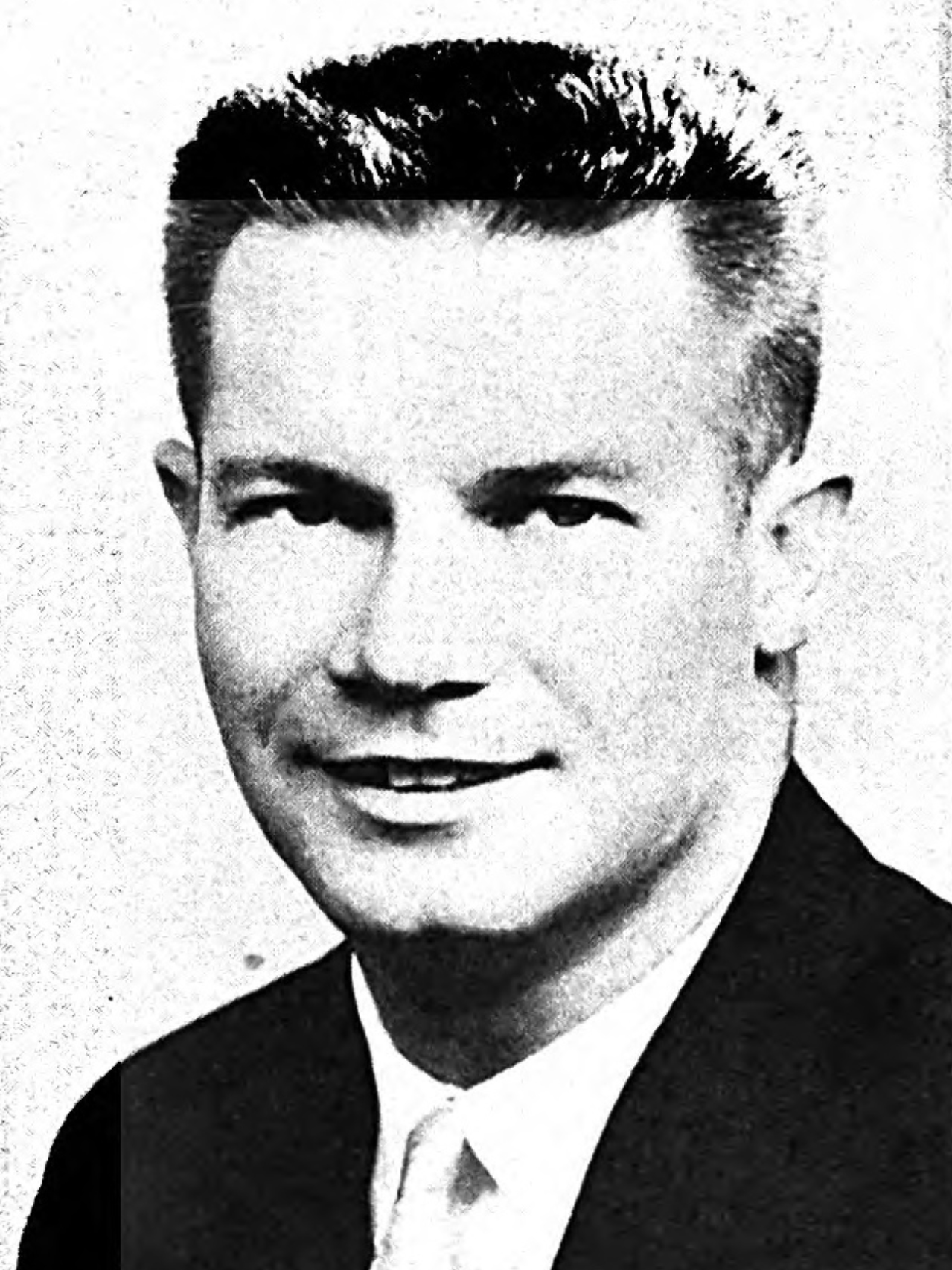

Member of the California State Assembly from the 77th district
- In office January 7, 1963 – July 15, 1966
- Preceded by: Sheridan N. Hegland
- Succeeded by: Wadie P. Deddeh

Personal details
- Born: February 24, 1926 New Rochelle, New York, U.S.
- Died: November 21, 1971 (aged 45) Chula Vista, California, U.S.
- Party: Republican
- Spouse: Peggy Jeanne Pearse (m. 1950)
- Children: 2

Military service
- Branch/service: United States Army
- Battles/wars: World War II

Richard J. Donovan (February 24, 1926 – November 21, 1971) was an American politician who served in the California State Assembly for the 77th district from 1963 to 1966. During World War II, he served in the United States Navy.

California named Richard J. Donovan Correctional Facility after him.
