= James R. Mills =

American politician (1927–2021)

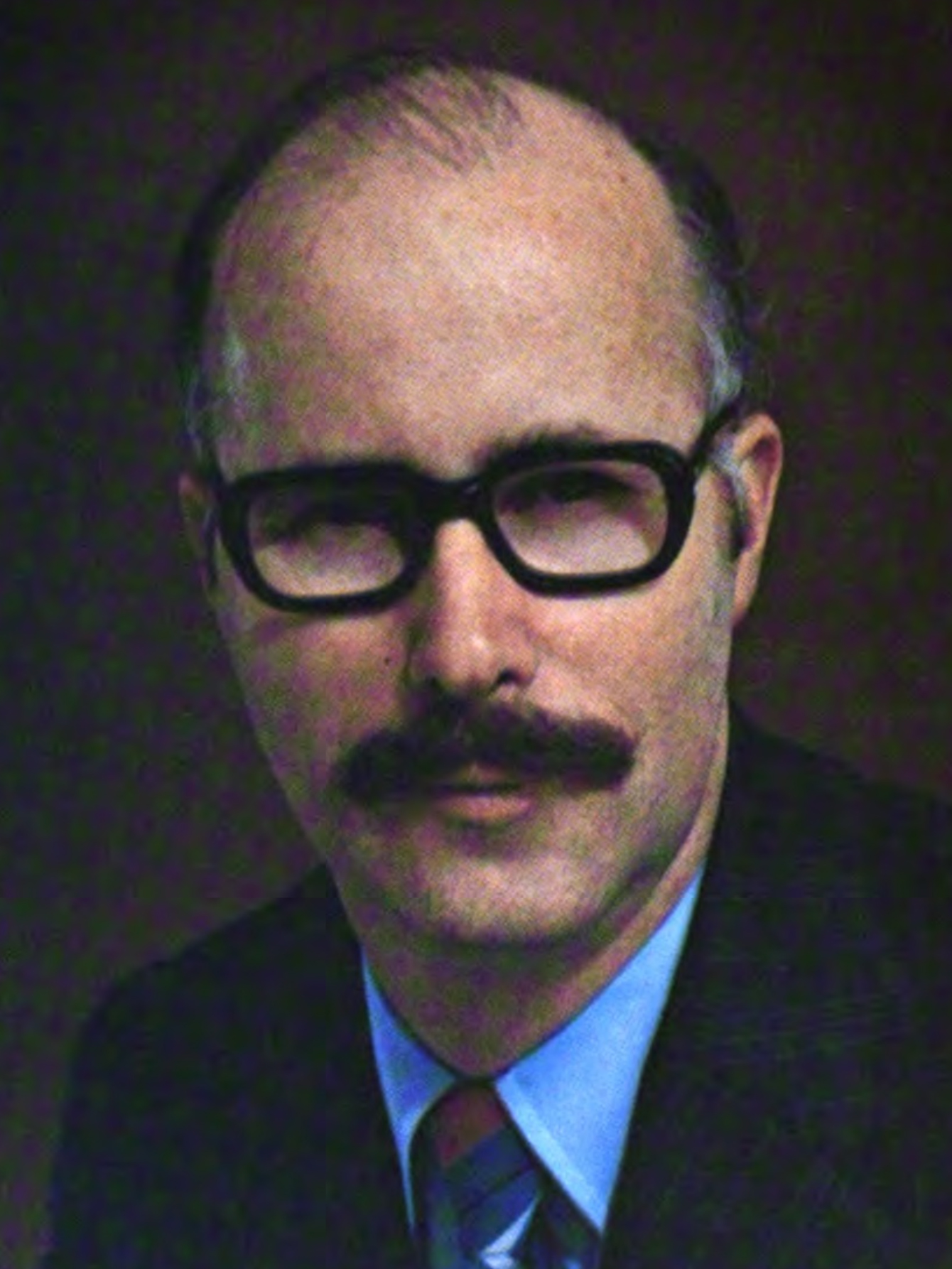
- Official portrait, 1971

44th President pro tempore of the California State Senate
- In office November 30, 1970 – November 30, 1980
- Preceded by: Jack Schrade
- Succeeded by: David Roberti

Member of the California Senate from the 40th district
- In office January 2, 1967 – November 30, 1982
- Preceded by: Jack Schrade
- Succeeded by: Wadie P. Deddeh

Member of the California State Assembly from the 79th district
- In office January 2, 1961 – January 2, 1967
- Preceded by: George J. Lapthorne
- Succeeded by: Frederick James Bear

Personal details
- Born: June 6, 1927 San Diego, California, U.S.
- Died: March 27, 2021 (aged 93) Bonita, California, U.S.
- Party: Democratic
- Spouse: Joanna Rohrbough (m. 1959, divorced)
- Children: 3
- Education: San Diego State College (BA, MA)

Military service
- Allegiance: United States
- Branch/service: United States Army
- Years of service: 1950–1953
- Battles/wars: Korean War

James R. Mills (June 6, 1927 – March 27, 2021) was an American Democratic politician from California, who held elected office from 1960 to 1982, first in the California State Assembly from 1961 to 1965, then in the California State Senate from 1967 to 1982 where he also served as the 44th president pro tempore from November 1970 to November 1980.

== Career ==
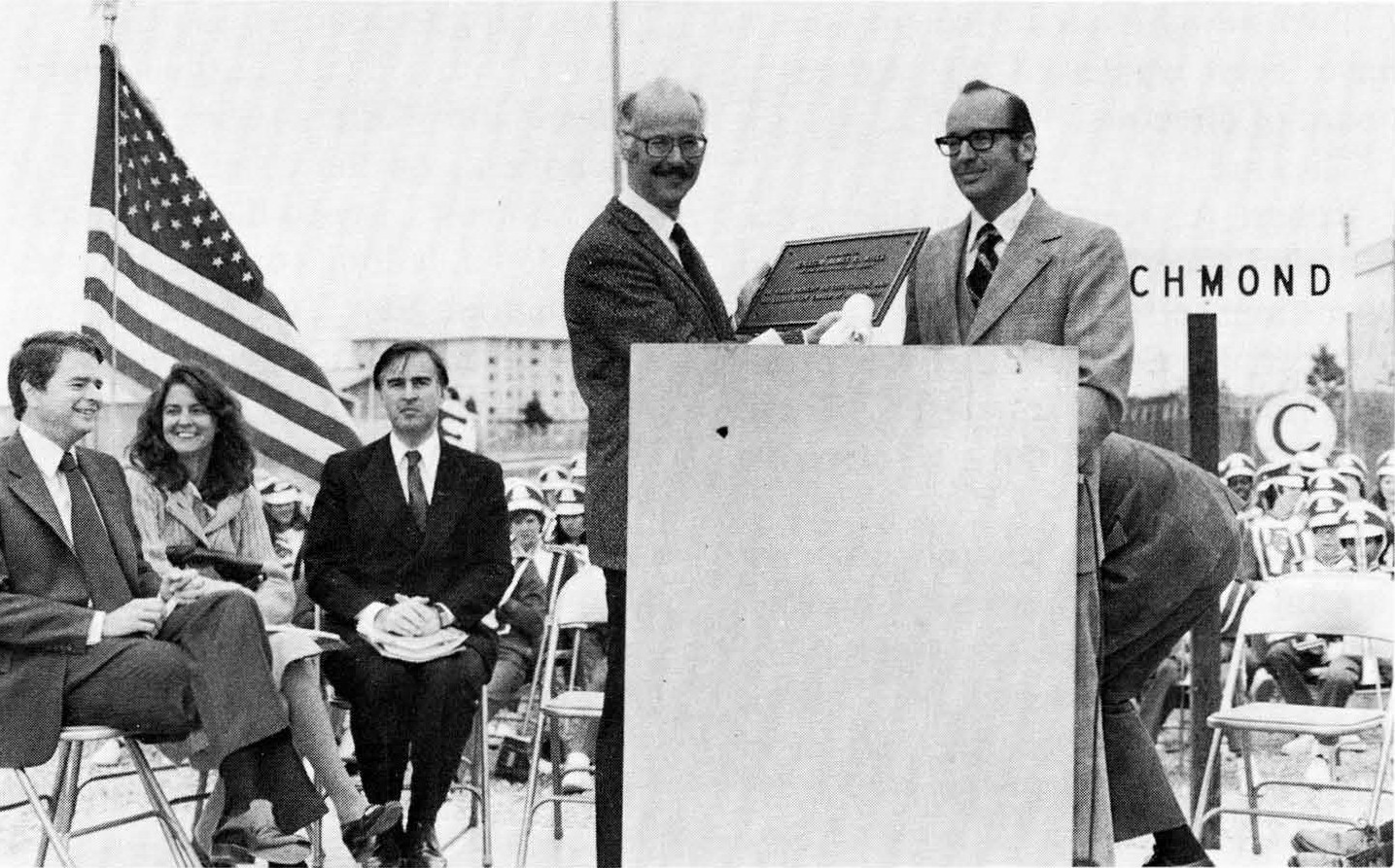
Mills during the opening of Richmond station in 1977.

Mills was first elected to the California State Assembly in 1960 to replace George G. Crawford, who had resigned the 79th District seat on February 15, 1960, to become a San Diego Municipal Court judge and George J. Lapthorne, who won the special election for the seat, but did not seek re-election later that year. Mills would officially take the seat on January 2, 1961, and win re-election to the lower chamber in 1962 and 1964.

Mills ran for California State Senate in 1966 and won the recently redistricted 40th District seat. Mills wrapped up his term in the Assembly in January 1967 and would take the oath of office on the Senate side of the California State Capitol in January 1967. He would later win re-election to the State Senate in 1970, 1974, and 1978 before he retired in 1982. During his time in the upper chamber, his peers elected him the 44th president pro tempore of the California State Senate, a position that he held from November 1970 to November 1980.

In 1966, at the start of his career as a state senator, he introduced a constitutional amendment to make the California State Legislature a full-time operation. Previously, the Assembly and Senate had held a full legislative session every other year. In arguing for the bill, which was later approved by voters, Mills said that a full-time legislature would be able to respond more quickly to the needs of a fast-growing state. Mills would later say that he came to regret the change because it robbed legislators of the time off necessary to reflect on what they were doing, and what they had done.

During his time in the legislature, Mills was also a champion for the preservation of historic buildings and for public transportation authoring several laws that would create lasting changes in the state of California.

In 1972, he authored a state law that would come to be known as the Mills Act, which allowed cities to reduce property tax for owners of a historic building in exchange for its continued preservation. Mills was inspired to write the law when a developer proposed demolishing the historic Hotel del Coronado in his district. The law was deemed unconstitutional in 1973, but voters later approved it as a constitutional amendment in 1976. The Mills Act, named after James Mills, has been credited with saving thousands of historic buildings from destruction in California.

During his career, Mills was an advocate for public transportation. He, along with city council member Leon Williams, helped formulate what would become the San Diego Metropolitan Transit System (MTS) in the 1970s. In 1975, he authored a bill that would lead to the creation of the San Diego Trolley. At the time, the project faced opposition from some local government officials, but it later would become the model for other light rail systems and launched the so-called "second-generation of light rail" in the United States. After his time in the state senate, President Jimmy Carter appointed him to the board of directors of Amtrak in 1977, where he served as chairman from 1980 to 1982, when he stepped down from the board. California Governor George Deukmejian appointed Mills to San Diego's Metropolitan Transit Development Board (now known as the San Diego Metropolitan Transit System) in 1984, where he served as chairman from 1985 to 1994, when he stepped down from the board. The San Diego Metropolitan Transit System headquarters building is named after him.

During his time as a state lawmaker, he also authored legislation that created Old Town San Diego State Historic Park, and secured appropriations for the restoration of the Old Globe Theatre, construction of Malcolm A. Love Library at San Diego State University (his alma mater), and construction of Third College (now known as the Thurgood Marshall College) at the University of California, San Diego.

== Personal life ==
Mills was born in San Diego on June 6, 1927, attended public schools in San Diego and received a B.A. in Social Studies and an M.A. in History from San Diego State College (now known as San Diego State University). He served with United States Army from 1950 to 1953 during the Korean War. On January 9, 1959, he married Joanna Rohrbough. They had three children: Beatrice, William, and Eleanor. The couple would later divorce sometime in the 1980s. Mills was a longtime resident of Coronado, California, a resort city located across San Diego Bay from downtown San Diego.

Mills was the curator of the San Diego History Center's Junípero Serra Museum, from 1955 to 1960, when he left to run for the state assembly. Mills was also a middle school history teacher and the author of several books. Drawing on his time with the San Diego History Center, two of his works deal with the history of San Diego: Historical Landmarks of San Diego County and San Diego: Where California Began. His 1987 book, A Disorderly House: The Brown-Unruh Years in Sacramento looks back on his time in the state capitol and his interactions with Governor Pat Brown and state Assemblyman Jesse "Big Daddy" Unruh. His other two books were about Pontius Pilate: Poems of Inspiration from the Masters and The Gospel According to Pontius Pilate, which was a historical novel, about the compromises the Roman governor of Judea faced in condemning Jesus to death.

He died of kidney cancer on March 27, 2021, at a hospice facility in Bonita, California, at age 93.

California Assembly
Preceded by George J. Lapthorne	California State Assemblymember; 79th district January 2, 1961 – January 2, 1967	Succeeded by Frederick James Bear
California Senate
Preceded by Jack Schrade	California State Senator; 40th district January 2, 1967 – November 30, 1982	Succeeded by Wadie P. Deddeh
Political offices
Preceded by Jack Schrade	44th President Pro Tempore of the California Senate; November 30, 1970 – November 30, 1980	Succeeded by David Roberti
