= Jack Schrade =

American politician (1902–1992)

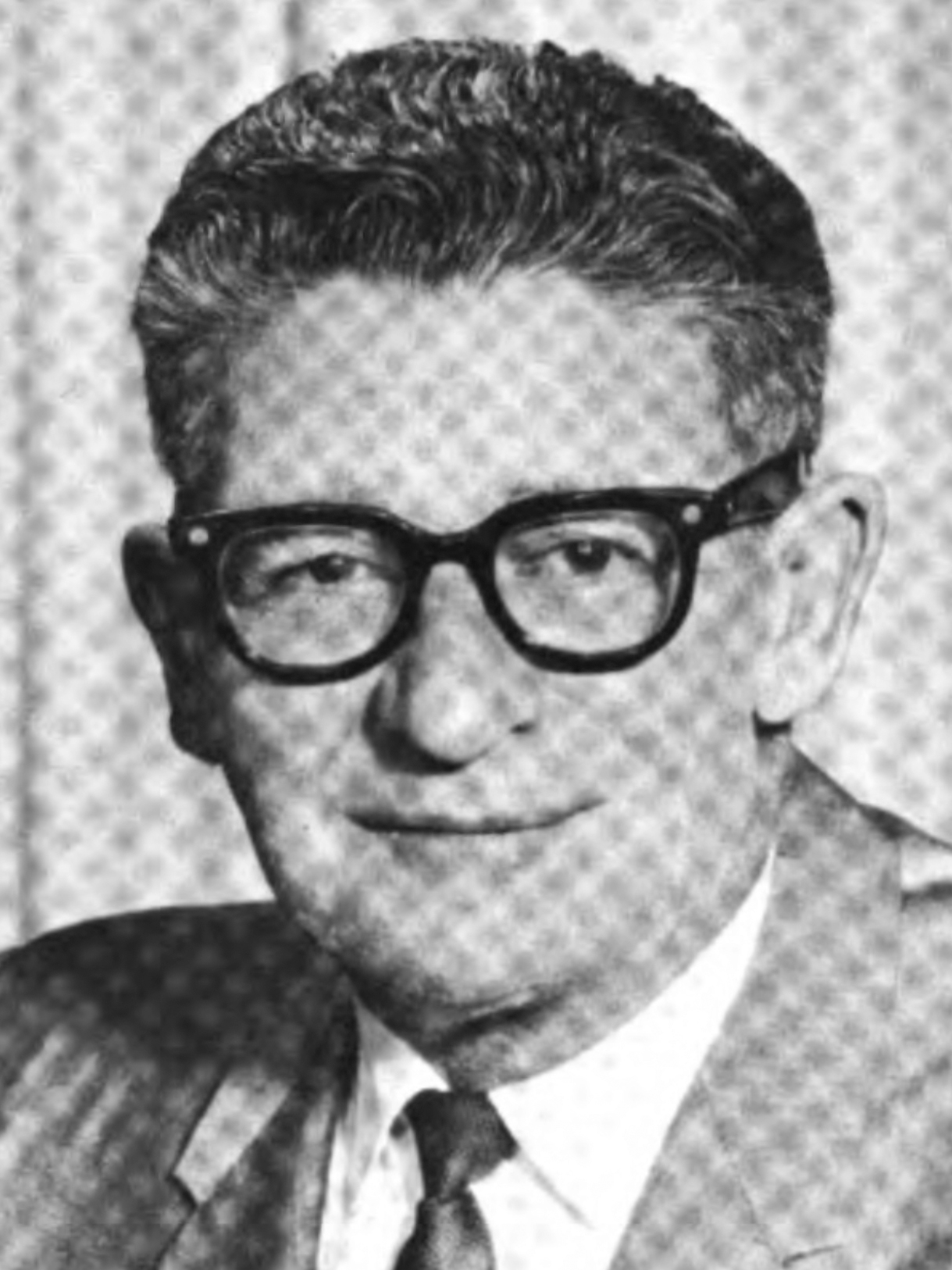
- Official portrait, 1963

43rd President pro tempore of the California State Senate
- In office February 10, 1970 – November 30, 1970
- Preceded by: Howard Way
- Succeeded by: James R. Mills

Member of the California State Senate
- In office January 2, 1967 – November 30, 1976
- Preceded by: Aaron W. Quick
- Succeeded by: Bob Wilson
- Constituency: 39th district
- In office January 7, 1963 – January 2, 1967
- Preceded by: Hugo Mark Fisher
- Succeeded by: James R. Mills
- Constituency: 40th district

Member of the California State Assembly from the 80th district
- In office January 3, 1955 – January 7, 1963
- Preceded by: Ralph R. Cloyed
- Succeeded by: Hale Ashcraft

Personal details
- Born: May 25, 1902 Williamsport, Pennsylvania, U.S.
- Died: April 14, 1992 (aged 89) Yolo County, California, U.S.
- Party: Republican
- Spouse: Margie Schrade

Jack Schrade (May 25, 1902 – April 14, 1992) was an American politician. He served as a Republican member for the 80th district of the California State Assembly. He also served as a member for the 39th and 40th district of the California State Senate.

== Life and career ==
Schrade was born in Williamsport, Pennsylvania.

In 1955, Schrade was elected to represent the 80th district of the California State Assembly, serving until 1963. In the same year, he was elected to represent the 40th district of the California State Senate, serving until 1967, when he was elected to represent the 39th district, serving until 1976.

Schrade died in April 1992 in Yolo County, California, at the age of 89.
