= Tom Suitt =

American businessman and politician

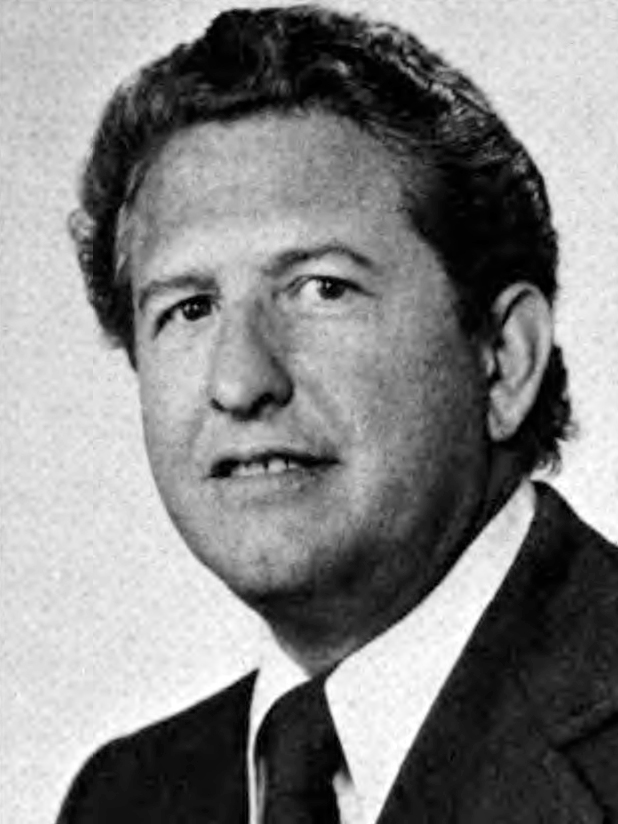
- Official portrait, 1975

Member of the California State Assembly from the 29th district
- In office December 2, 1974 – November 30, 1978
- Preceded by: Raymond T. Seeley
- Succeeded by: David G. Kelley

Personal details
- Born: September 30, 1936 Lake Village, Arkansas
- Died: October 8, 2005 (aged 69) Palm Springs, California
- Party: Democratic
- Spouse: Jaqueline Helen Strauss (m. 1960)
- Children: 4

Noah Thomas Suitt (September 30, 1936 – October 5, 2005) was an American businessman and politician from California and a member of the Democratic Party.

A banker and real estate developer from Palm Springs, Suitt ran for the California State Assembly and unseated GOP incumbent Raymond T. Seeley in the post Watergate 1974 election that proved great for Democrats up and down the ballot. In 1976 he won reelection over Riverside County Supervisor Al McCandless but lost his bid for a third term in 1978 to Republican David G. Kelley, a year that turned out to be a great for down ballot Republicans.

Suitt also served as Chairman of the Board of Desert Regional Medical Center, was a founder of the Palm Springs Economic Development Corporation and was founder and former chairman of Canyon National Bank.

== Electoral history ==
Member, California State Assembly: 1974-1978
Year	Office	Democrat	Votes	Pct	Republican	Votes	Pct
1974	California State Assembly; District 75	Tom Suitt	40,561	50.9%	Raymond T. Seeley	39,132	49.1%
1976	California State Assembly; District 75	Tom Suitt	63,218	56.9%	Al McCandless	47,825	43.1%
1978	California State Assembly; District 75	Tom Suitt	42,191	42.3%	David G. Kelley	57,449	57.7%

Political offices
Preceded by Raymond T. Seeley	California State Assembly 75th District; 1974 – 1978	Succeeded by David G. Kelley
