= Hugo Mark Fisher =

American judge and politician (1921–2015)

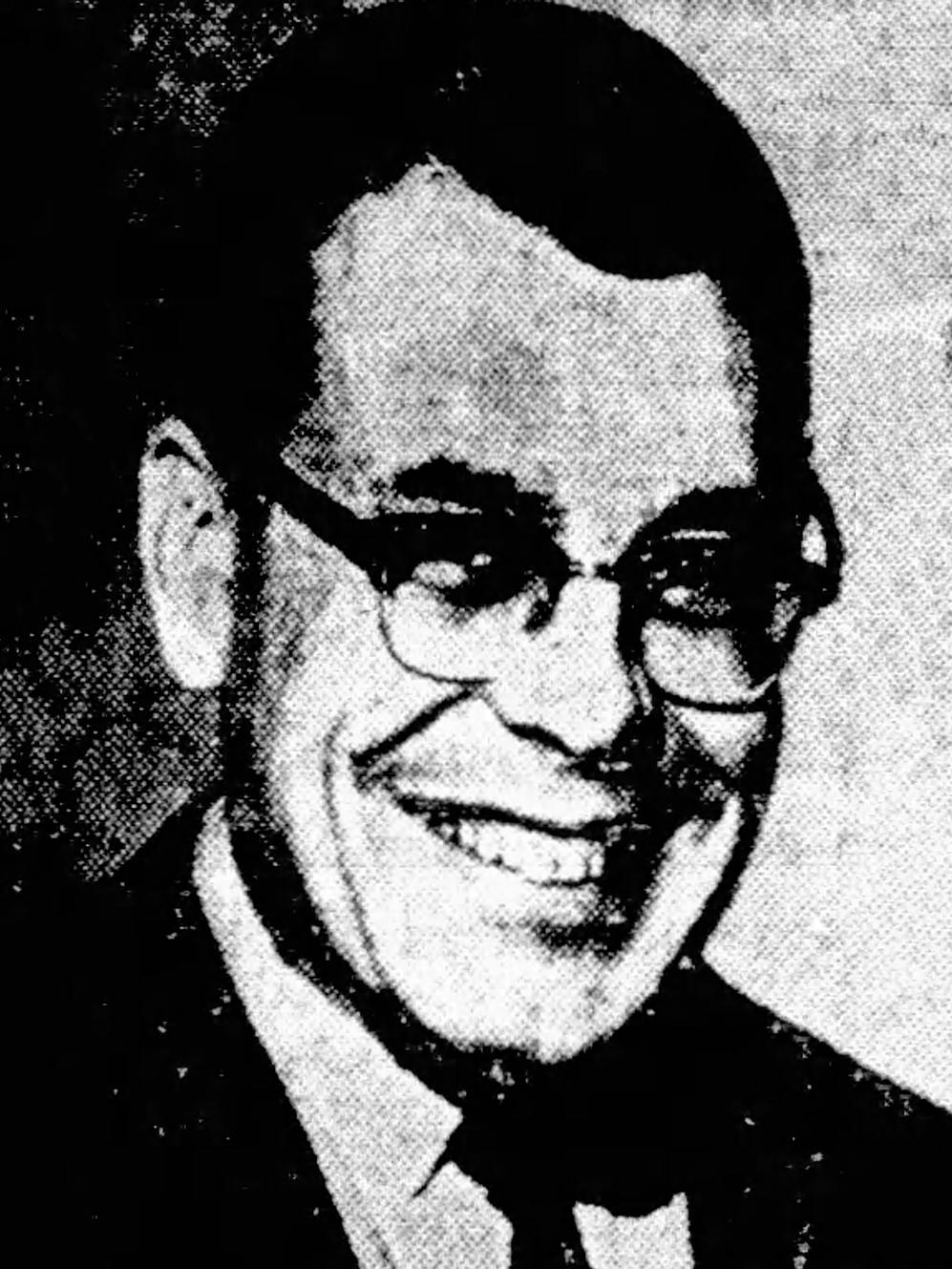

Member of the California State Senate from the 40th district
- In office January 5, 1959 – January 7, 1963
- Preceded by: Fred H. Kraft
- Succeeded by: Jack Schrade

Personal details
- Born: April 30, 1921 San Diego, California, U.S.
- Died: July 8, 2015 (aged 94) San Diego, California, U.S.
- Party: Democratic
- Spouse(s): Lucia Fisher (m. 1942–1970) Phyllis Fisher (m. 1973–1983)
- Children: 3
- Education: San Diego State University; Alliant International University
- Occupation: Judge

Hugo Mark Fisher (April 30, 1921 – July 8, 2015) was an American judge and politician. He served as a Democratic member for the 40th district of the California State Senate.

== Life and career ==
Fisher was born in San Diego, California. He attended San Diego High School. He also attended San Diego State University and Alliant International University.

In 1958, Fisher was elected to represent the 40th district of the California State Senate. He was a campaign manager for John F. Kennedy in 1960. In two years, he was succeeded by Jack Schrade.

In 1966, Fisher was appointed by California Governor Pat Brown to serve as a judge in the superior court in San Diego, California. He served until 1983.

Fisher died in July 2015 in San Diego, California, at the age of 94.
