= Bonnie Garcia =

American politician (born 1962)

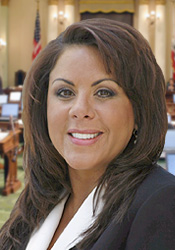

Member of the California State Assembly from the 80th district
- In office December 2, 2002 – November 30, 2008
- Preceded by: David G. Kelley
- Succeeded by: Manuel Perez

Personal details
- Born: August 13, 1962 (age 64) New York, New York, U.S.
- Party: Republican
- Spouse: Javier Garcia
- Children: 2
- Education: Southern Illinois University
- Profession: Politician

Bonnie Garcia (born August 13, 1962) is a California politician. She was the representative for California's 80th State Assembly district, serving eastern Riverside County and all of Imperial County, from 2002 through 2008. In 2014 she was a candidate for the California State Senate to represent the 28th district, centered in Riverside County but lost the Republican primary to Jeff Stone. She is a Republican and lives in Palm Desert, California.

Assemblywoman Garcia was elected to the post in 2002, being the first Hispanic woman to represent the district and the first Puerto Rican elected to statewide office in California. By 2004, Garcia had become a member of Governor Arnold Schwarzenegger's transition team after the recall election against Gray Davis and was named as one of California's delegates to the Republican National Convention.

Garcia was one of five children born in Manhattan's Lower East Side to a young Puerto Rican couple who divorced soon after her birth. At age thirty-eight, after years of night classes, Garcia earned a Bachelor of Science degree in workforce development from Southern Illinois University.

Schwarzenegger made an off-the-cuff comment on September 7, 2006 describing her as having a "hot Latina temperament", which brought him some criticism. But Garcia, a fellow Republican, stated that she was "not offended by the Governor's comments."

She was ineligible to seek reelection to the State Assembly in 2008 due to term limits. On December 31, 2008, Schwarzenegger appointed Garcia to the state's Unemployment Insurance Appeals Board. She also runs her own public affairs firm. In 2014, she ran for the California State Senate, but lost a close election to Riverside County Supervisor Jeff Stone, a fellow Republican.

California Assembly
Preceded by David G. Kelley	California's 80th State Assembly district December 2, 2002 - November 30, 2008	Succeeded by Manuel Perez
