= Kathryn Niehouse =

American politician (1898–1961)

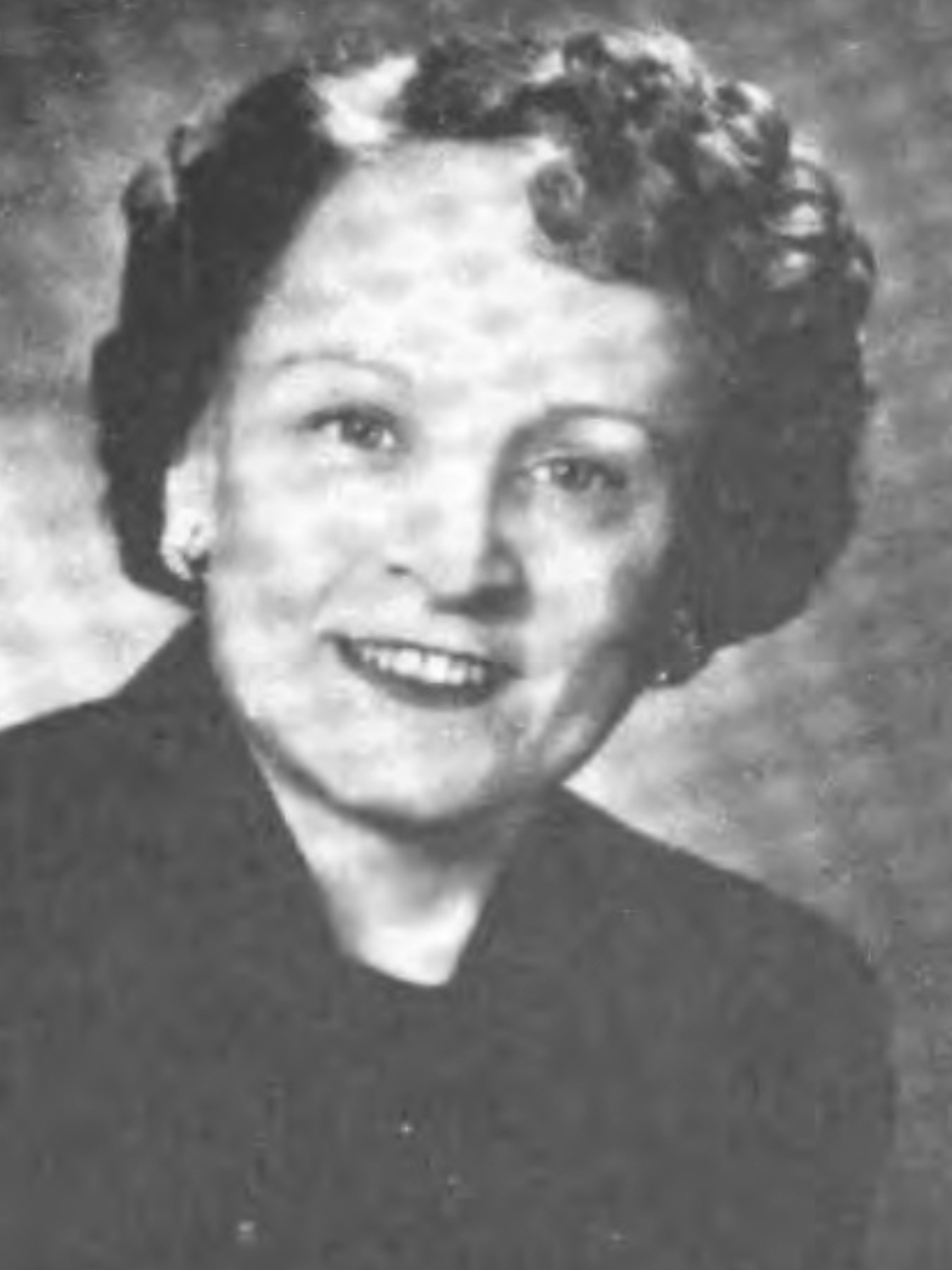

Member of the California State Assembly from the 79th district
- In office January 4, 1943 – January 3, 1955
- Preceded by: Paul A. Richie
- Succeeded by: Wanda Sankary

Personal details
- Born: Kathryn Theresa McBroom; March 23, 1898 Hillsboro, Indiana, U.S.
- Died: February 25, 1961 (aged 62) San Diego, California, U.S.
- Party: Republican
- Children: 1

Kathryn Theresa Niehouse (née McBroom; March 23, 1898 – February 25, 1961) was an American politician and insurance agent.

She was a Republican state legislator in California. She served in the legislature from the 79th district in San Diego, from 1942 to 1954. She had a son.
