= George J. Lapthorne =

American politician

Member of the California State Assembly from the 79th district
- In office November 30, 1960 – January 2, 1961
- Preceded by: George G. Crawford
- Succeeded by: James R. Mills

Personal details
- Born: March 19, 1890 Ohio, U.S.
- Died: December 24, 1984 (aged 94)
- Party: Democratic

George J. Lapthorne (March 19, 1890 – December 24, 1984) was an American politician. He served as a Democratic member for the 79th district of the California State Assembly.

== Life and career ==
Lapthorne was born in Ohio. He was a realtor.

In 1960, Lapthorne was elected to represent the 79th district of the California State Assembly, succeeding George G. Crawford. He served until 1961, when he was succeeded by James R. Mills.

Lapthorne died on December 24, 1984, at the age of 94.
