= George G. Crawford (politician) =

American judge and politician (1920–2012)

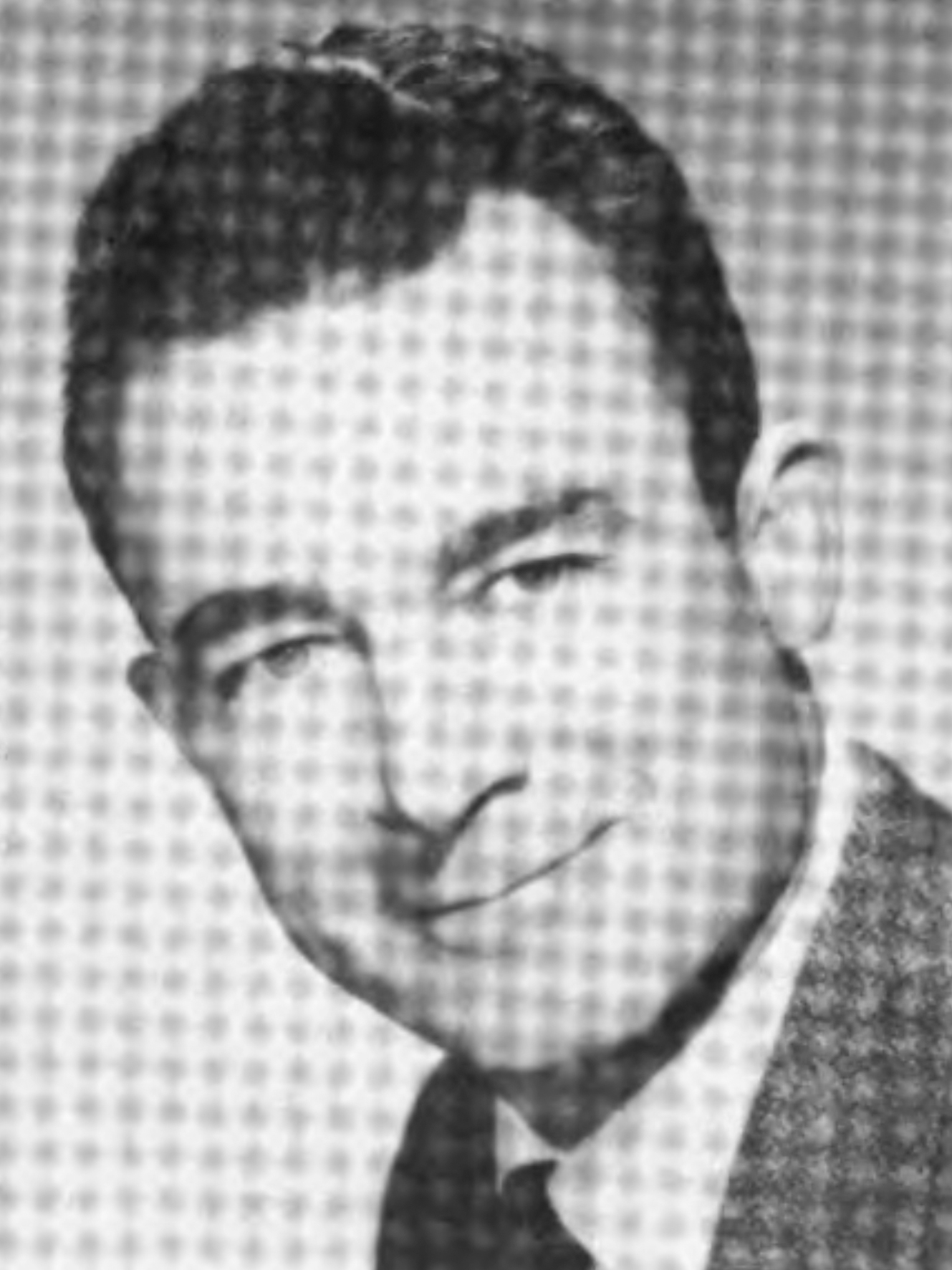
- Crawford in 1958

Member of the California State Assembly from the 79th district
- In office January 7, 1957 – February 15, 1960
- Preceded by: Wanda Sankary
- Succeeded by: George J. Lapthorne

Personal details
- Born: August 9, 1920 San Diego, California, U.S.
- Died: October 31, 2012 (aged 92) San Diego, California, U.S.
- Party: Republican
- Spouse: Esther
- Education: San Diego State University; Balboa University Law School
- Occupation: Judge

George G. Crawford (August 9, 1920 – October 31, 2012) was an American judge and politician. He served as a Republican member for the 79th district of the California State Assembly.

== Life and career ==
Crawford was born in San Diego, California. He attended San Diego State University and Balboa University Law School.

In 1956, Crawford was elected to represent the 79th district of the California State Assembly, succeeding Wanda Sankary. He served until 1960, when he was succeeded by George J. Lapthorne.

Crawford was a municipal court judge in San Diego.

Crawford died on October 31, 2012, at the age of 92.
