= Paul A. Richie =

American politician

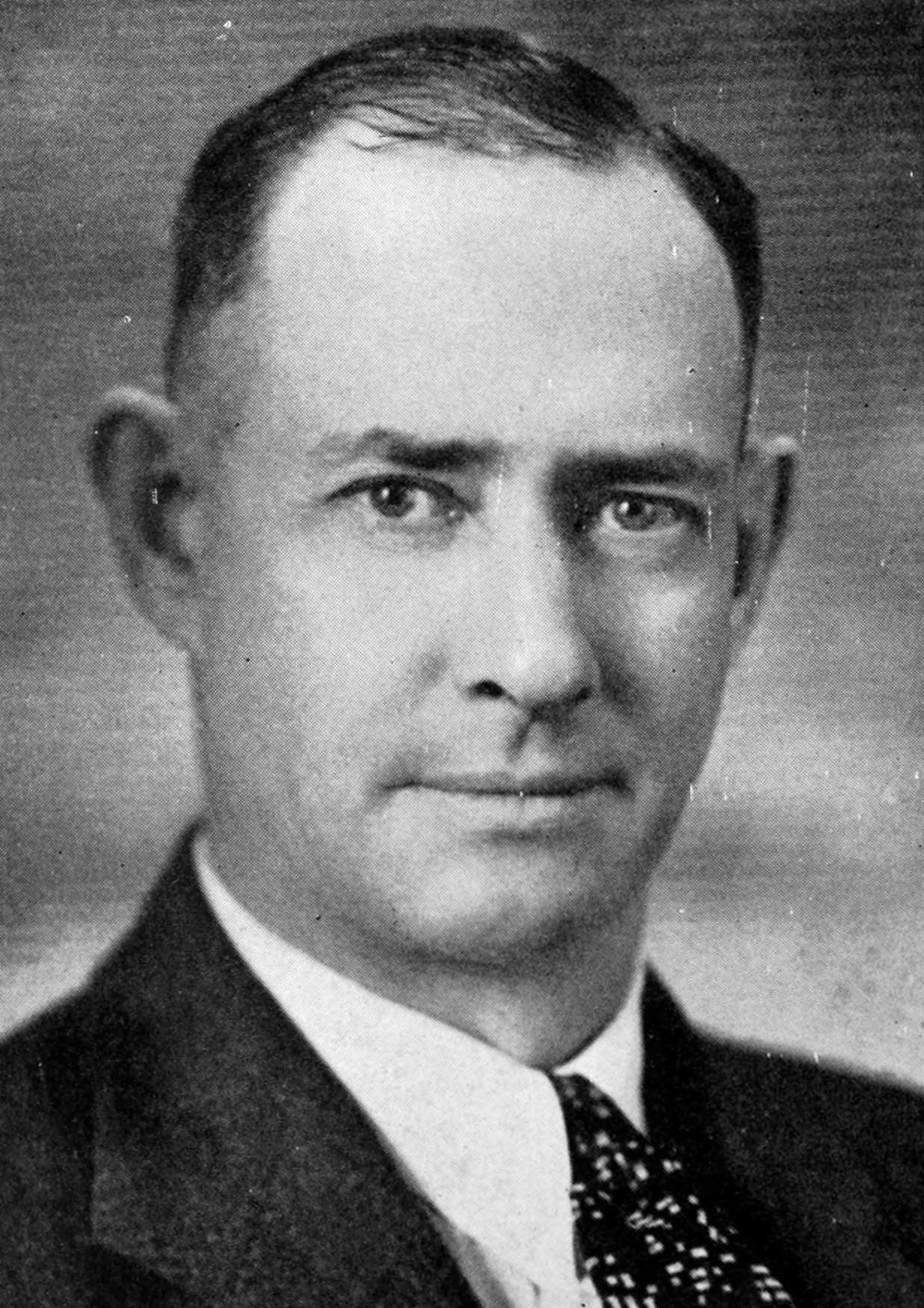
- Richie c. 1940

Member of the California State Assembly from the 79th district
- In office January 7, 1935 – January 4, 1943
- Preceded by: Bruce R. Stannard
- Succeeded by: Kathryn Niehouse

Personal details
- Born: December 20, 1893 Mondovi, Wisconsin, U.S.
- Died: February 7, 1973 (aged 79) El Cajon, California, U.S.
- Party: Democratic (after 1934); Socialist (before 1934)
- Education: University of Michigan; Ferris Institute
- Occupation: Schoolteacher, farmer, laborer

Paul Albert Richie (December 20, 1893 – February 7, 1973) was an American educator, farmer and politician who served four terms in the California State Assembly for the 79th district from 1935 to 1943.

== Career ==
Richie was one of two dozen "EPIC Democrats" elected to the state legislature in 1934. Before his election, he was a member of the Socialist Party. He remained a life-long advocate for socialism. During his time in the Assembly, he was one of only three members to vote against removing the Communist Party's ballot access, and the only one to vote against a bill banning Communists from working for the state of California. He was defeated by Republican Kathryn Niehouse in his bid for a fifth term, after which he returned to citrus farming.

During the 1940 Democratic Party presidential primaries, Richie joined a left-wing slate pledged to lieutenant governor Ellis E. Patterson for president. They opposed incumbent Franklin D. Roosevelt on the grounds he was focusing too much on foreign affairs and not enough on domestic unemployment. The Patterson slate lost to Roosevelt's by a margin of fifteen to one.

== Works ==
- Five Men in a Boat (1933). San Diego: San Diego Printing Co.
