= Clair Burgener =

American politician (1921–2009)

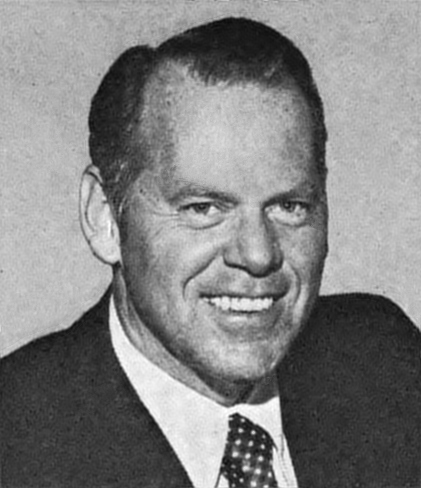

Member of the U.S. House of Representatives from California
- In office January 3, 1973 – January 3, 1983
- Preceded by: Constituency established
- Succeeded by: Ron Packard
- Constituency: 42nd district (1973–1975); 43rd district (1975–1983)

Member of the California State Senate from the 38th district
- In office January 2, 1967 – January 3, 1973
- Preceded by: Thomas M. Rees
- Succeeded by: John Stull

Member of the California State Assembly from the 76th district
- In office January 7, 1963 – January 2, 1967
- Preceded by: Leverette House
- Succeeded by: Pete Wilson

Personal details
- Born: Clair Walter Burgener; December 5, 1921 Vernal, Utah, U.S.
- Died: September 9, 2006 (aged 84) Encinitas, California, U.S.
- Party: Republican
- Spouse: Marvia Hobusch (m. 1941)
- Children: 3
- Education: San Diego State University (BA)

Military service
- Branch/service: United States Army
- Battles/wars: World War II

Clair Walter Burgener (December 5, 1921 – September 9, 2006) was an American World War II veteran and politician who served as a Republican member of the U.S. House of Representatives from 1973 to 1983.

== Early life ==
Clair Burgener was born in Vernal, Utah, and grew up there and in Salt Lake City.

=== World War II ===
He served in the Pacific in the Army Air Corps during World War II as a navigator. He attained second lieutenant and was awarded the Air Medal in 1945. Later, he was recalled for Air Force service during the Korean War.

=== Education and early career ===
Burgener graduated from San Diego State College with a BA in liberal arts. He was a realtor in the early 1950s with his brother. In 1951 Burgener was on the stage of the Old Globe Theatre in Balboa Park, playing Elwood P. Dowd in Harvey for a 33-day run.

Burgener was a Latter-day Saint.

== Political life ==
At a cocktail party one evening, as related by Lionel Van Deerlin, an oilman from Texas said, "I like the cut of your jib, young fella." He continued, "If you do go into politics, I'd like to help. Here's a check for five thousand dollars. Cash it whenever you decide to run." A few months later, Burgener ran for a city council vacancy, but returned the check, writing, "Thank you very much, but I feel it would be improper to accept so large an amount from a single out-of-state contributor."

=== City council and state legislature ===
Burgener was elected to the San Diego City Council in 1953, serving until 1957. On the city council he pushed for the development of Mission Bay Park. Burgener later recalled the office as "the job I enjoyed the least".

Burgener was then elected to the California State Assembly 1963–1967 and California State Senate, 1967–1973. Burgener later said his time in the State Capitol constituted his most productive and rewarding years. He was most proud of state legislation he pushed through in 1963 that mandated classroom training for the intellectually disabled.

=== Congress ===
Burgener was elected to five terms in the U.S. House of Representatives, from 1973 to 1983. He had a mostly conservative voting record, but often crossed party lines to work with Van Deerlin, a Democrat, to further San Diego interests.

In 1980, Ku Klux Klan leader Tom Metzger won the Democratic primary in Burgener's district, at that time the most populous Congressional district in the country. The Democrats, from Gov. Jerry Brown on down, disavowed Metzger and endorsed Burgener, clinching his election to a fifth term. Burgener dug up and publicized Metzger's frequent, ill-conceived statements and won the election with 86% of the vote, breaking a 40-year-old record for votes received in a House race. In 1982 he did not seek reelection and retired.

== Post-political life ==
Burgener remained active in civic and political affairs after his retirement. He was a Regent of the University of California from 1988 to 1997. After Burgener's son Rod was diagnosed as developmentally disabled, Burgener became a champion of mentally-disabled children. He did much work for the cause, leading various associations and committees helping intellectually disabled children, including the Clair Burgener Foundation for the Developmentally Disabled.

After his retirement, Congressman Burgener lived at Rancho Santa Fe, California, with his wife Marvia when he was diagnosed with Alzheimer's disease. Burgener died in 2006 in Encinitas, California. He and his wife were survived by two sons, John and Greg.

== Legacy ==
Named for Burgener are the Clair Burgener Academy, Oceanside, California, the Clair Burgener Clinical Research Diagnostic Unit, University of California, San Diego.

== Electoral results ==
Clair Burgener electoral history

1972 United States House of Representatives elections in California
Party	Candidate	Votes	%
Republican	Clair Burgener (Incumbent)	155,965	67.4
Democratic	Bob Lowe	67,477	29.2
American Independent	Armin R. Moths	7,812	3.4
Total votes		231,254	100.0
Republican win (new seat)			

1974 United States House of Representatives elections in California
Party	Candidate	Votes	%
Republican	Clair Burgener (Incumbent)	114,102	60.4
Democratic	Bill Bandes	74,905	39.6
Total votes		189,007	100.0
Republican hold			

1976 United States House of Representatives elections in California
Party	Candidate	Votes	%
Republican	Clair Burgener (Incumbent)	173,576	65.0
Democratic	Pat Kelly	93,475	35.0
Total votes		267,051	100.0
Republican hold			

1978 United States House of Representatives elections in California
Party	Candidate	Votes	%
Republican	Clair Burgener (Incumbent)	167,150	68.7
Democratic	Reuben B. Brooks	76,308	31.3
Total votes		243,458	100.0
Republican hold			

1980 United States House of Representatives elections in California
Party	Candidate	Votes	%
Republican	Clair Burgener (Incumbent)	298,815	86.6
Democratic	Tom Metzger	46,361	13.4
Total votes		345,176	100.0
Republican hold			

U.S. House of Representatives
New constituency	Member of the U.S. House of Representatives from California's 42nd congressional district 1973–1975	Succeeded by Lionel Van Deerlin
Preceded by Victor Veysey	Member of the U.S. House of Representatives from California's 43rd congressional district 1975–1983	Succeeded by Ron Packard
Party political offices
Preceded by Marjorie Holt	Chair of the Republican Study Committee; 1977–1978	Succeeded by Dave Treen
