= David G. Kelley =

American politician (1928–2025)

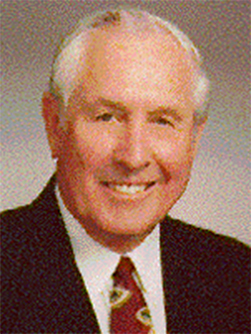

Member of the California Senate from the 37th district
- In office December 7, 1992 – November 30, 2000
- Preceded by: Marian Bergeson
- Succeeded by: Jim Battin

Member of the California State Assembly
- In office December 4, 2000 – November 30, 2002
- Preceded by: Jim Battin
- Succeeded by: Bonnie Garcia
- Constituency: 80th district (2000–2002)
- In office December 4, 1978 – November 30, 1992
- Preceded by: Tom Suitt
- Succeeded by: Julie Bornstein
- Constituency: 75th district (1978–1982); 73rd district (1982–1992)

Personal details
- Born: October 11, 1928 Riverside, California, U.S.
- Died: September 24, 2025 (aged 96)
- Party: Republican
- Spouse: Brigitte
- Children: 4
- Education: California State Polytechnic University, San Luis Obispo
- Occupation: Businessman

Military service
- Branch: United States Air Force
- Conflict: Korean War

David Gerald Kelley (October 11, 1928 – September 24, 2025) was an American farmer and politician from California who was a member of the Republican Party.

A graduate of the Army and Navy Academy Class of 1947, Kelley attended California State Polytechnic University, San Luis Obispo, majoring in citrus fruit production. His education was interrupted by service as a pilot in the U.S. Air Force during the Korean conflict. A successful citrus rancher in the Hemet, California area for more than 40 years, he was active in the Riverside County Farm Bureau from 1955, and served as both president and vice president, as well as on the board of directors of the California Farm Bureau Federation.

Kelley also served as director of the Hemet-San Jacinto Basin Resource Conservation District.

Kelley died on September 24, 2025, at the age of 96.

== State Assembly ==
In 1978, Kelley ran for the 75th district in the California State Assembly and ousted 2-term incumbent Tom Suitt (D-Palm Springs) in what turned out to be a great year for down ballot Republicans across the state. Kelley would hold the seat (renumbered the 73rd after the 1981 reapportionment) with little trouble for 6 more terms. The only time a sitting elected official challenged Kelley was in 1984 when then Democratic Corona city councilman S.R. "Al" Lopez made the run, but failed to make an impression.

== State Senate ==
In 1992, Kelley decided to run for the redrawn (and open) 37th district in the California State Senate. He faced his Assembly colleague Carol Bentley (R-El Cajon) in the primary, both candidates among the more mild-mannered legislators. Nevertheless, the race became heated. Kelley repeatedly hit Bentley over her ethics, with his specific attacks over her "ghost voting" (leaving her voting card behind while she was away from the Capitol and allowing other members to vote for her) throwing her campaign off balance. Kelley prevailed with 52% of the vote.

He was reelected to the state Senate in 1996 and served one additional term in the Assembly (2000–02) before retiring from elective office.

Kelley was an Emeritus Trustee of the Army and Navy Academy.

== Electoral history ==
Member, California State Assembly: 1978–1992; 2001–03 Member, California State Senate : 1992–2000
Year	Office	Democrat	Votes	Pct	Republican	Votes	Pct
1978	California State Assembly; District 75	Tom Suitt	42,191	42.3%	David G. Kelley	57,449	57.7%
1980	California State Assembly; District 75	Daryl Gill	31,397	24.6%	David G. Kelley	88,884	68.7%
1982	California State Assembly; District 73	Julius Scher	37,196	36%	David G. Kelley	84,963	64%
1984	California State Assembly; District 73	S. R. "Al" Lopez	44,037	32%	David G. Kelley	93,545	68%
1986	California State Assembly; District 73	Byron Powell	36,184	33.5%	David G. Kelley	71,795	65.5%
1988	California State Assembly; District 73	Erlinda Rodriguez Parker	45,930	29.9%	David G. Kelley	103,038	67.1%
1990	California State Assembly; District 73	Ray Strait	54,716	43.8%	David G. Kelley	70,161	56.2%
1992	California State Senate; District 37	James Rickard	101,872	37.7%	Carol Bentley 48% David G. Kelley 52%	141,970	52.5%
1996	California State Senate; District 37	Hans Alfred Schroeder	75,943	29.6%	David G. Kelley	157,090	61.1%
2000	California State Assembly; District 80	Joey Acuna Jr.	53,849	44%	David G. Kelley	63,848	52.2%

California Assembly
Preceded by Tom Suitt	Member of the California State Assembly; 75th / 73rd District; December 4, 1978 – November 30, 1992	Succeeded by Julie Bornstein
California Senate
Preceded by Marian Bergeson	Member of the California State from the 37th district November 30, 1992 – November 30, 2000	Succeeded by Jim Battin
