= Bruce R. Stannard =

American politician

Member of the California State Assembly from the 79th district
- In office January 2, 1933 – January 7, 1935
- Preceded by: Edwin L. Head
- Succeeded by: Paul A. Richie

Personal details
- Born: August 20, 1879
- Died: May 30, 1954 (aged 74) St. Louis, Missouri, U.S.
- Party: Republican
- Spouse: Louise A Weber Stannard

Military service
- Branch/service: United States Army
- Rank: First sergeant
- Battles/wars: Spanish–American War; World War I

Bruce Robinson Stannard (August 20, 1879 – May 30, 1954) was a member of the United States Army during the Spanish–American War and World War I; he also served in the California State Assembly for the 79th district from 1933 to 1935.
