= Ralph R. Cloyed =

American politician (?–1955)

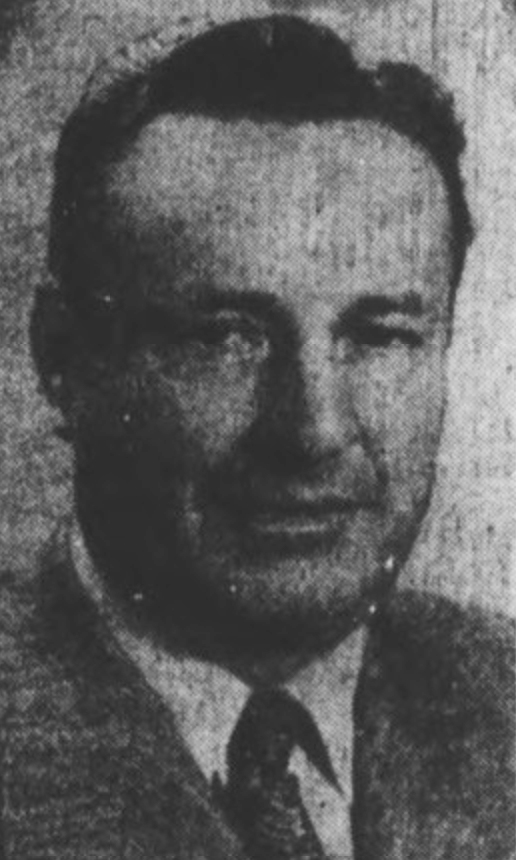
- Cloyed in 1949

Member of the California State Assembly from the 80th district
- In office January 8, 1951 – January 3, 1955
- Preceded by: Howard K. Cramer
- Succeeded by: Jack Schrade

Personal details
- Born: July 26, 1898/1902 Monroe County, Iowa, U.S.
- Died: April 19, 1955 San Diego, California, U.S.
- Party: Republican
- Spouse: Dorothy Powell

Ralph R. Cloyed (July 26, 1898/1902 – April 19, 1955) was an American politician. He served as a Republican member for the 80th district of the California State Assembly.

== Life and career ==
Cloyed was born in Monroe County, Iowa.

In 1951, Cloyed was elected to represent the 80th district of the California State Assembly, succeeding Howard K. Cramer. He served until 1955, when he was succeeded by Jack Schrade.

Cloyed died in April 1955 in San Diego, California.
