= V. Manuel Perez =

American politician

V. Manuel Pérez
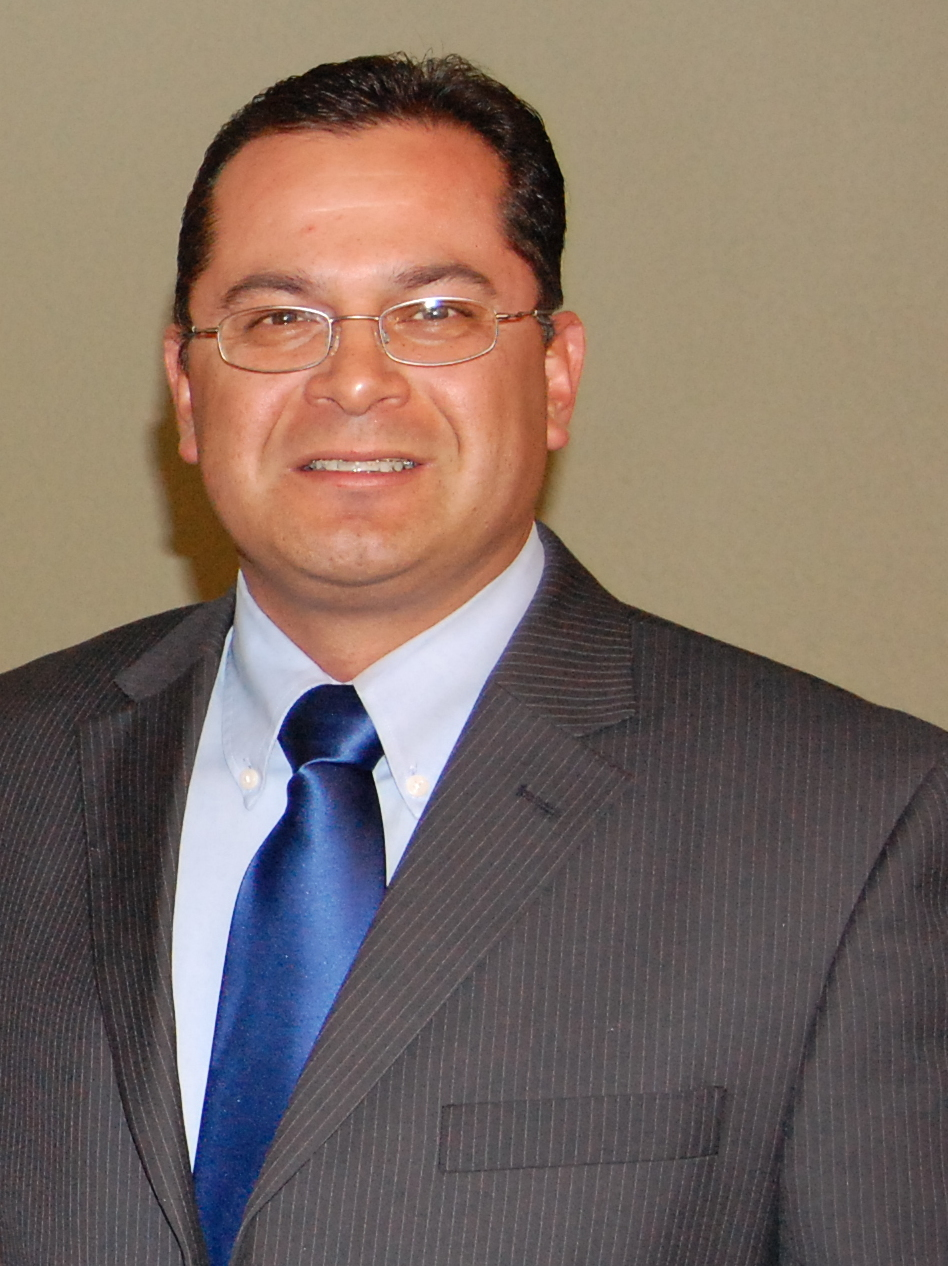

Chair of the Riverside County Board of Supervisors
- In office January 7, 2025 – January 13, 2026
- Preceded by: Chuck Washington
- Succeeded by: Karen Spiegel

Vice Chair of the Riverside County Board of Supervisors
- In office January 9, 2024 – January 7, 2025
- Preceded by: Chuck Washington
- Succeeded by: Karen Spiegel

Member of the Riverside County Board of Supervisors for 4th District
- Incumbent
- Assumed office May 9, 2017
- Preceded by: John J. Benoit

Majority Leader of the California Assembly
- In office May 12, 2014 – November 30, 2014
- Preceded by: Toni Atkins
- Succeeded by: Chris Holden

Member of the California State Assembly
- In office December 1, 2008 – November 30, 2014
- Preceded by: Bonnie Garcia
- Succeeded by: Eduardo Garcia
- Constituency: 80th district (2008–2012); 56th district (2012–2014)

Personal details
- Born: Victor Manuel Perez; June 18, 1973 (age 53) Indio, California
- Party: Democratic
- Spouse: Gladys Pérez
- Children: Rubén Pérez (2)
- Education: Harvard University; University of California, Riverside
- Occupation: Former director of community health

Victor Manuel Pérez (born June 18, 1973) is an American politician who sat in the California State Assembly as a Democrat. On May 9, 2017, California Governor Jerry Brown appointed him to the Riverside County Board of Supervisors, replacing the late John J. Benoit.

== Biography ==
"Manny" Perez was born in Indio, California, and raised in Riverside and Imperial counties by his parents, who met working in the area's agricultural fields. He attended public schools, including UC Riverside, then returned home to teach before earning a master's degree at Harvard University.

He has two sons, Ruben and Alejandro Perez.

== 2008 California State Assembly run ==
In June 2008, Pérez won his party's nomination as the Democratic candidate in California's 80th State Assembly district, which includes the eastern portion of Riverside County and all of Imperial County He was elected to the assembly in November 2008 and took office in December.

Pérez said that his priorities as an assembly member will be economic growth, stronger schools, expanded healthcare and environmental protection.
