= Jim Battin =

American politician

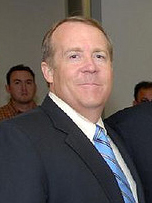

Member of the California Senate from the 37th district
- In office December 4, 2000 – November 30, 2008
- Preceded by: David G. Kelley
- Succeeded by: John J. Benoit

Member of the California State Assembly from the 80th district
- In office December 5, 1994 – November 30, 2000
- Preceded by: Julie Bornstein
- Succeeded by: David G. Kelley

Personal details
- Born: July 28, 1962 (age 64) Billings, Montana, U.S.
- Party: Republican
- Spouse: Mary Battin (m. 1985)
- Children: 3
- Relatives: James F. Battin (father)
- Education: University of Oregon

James Franklin Battin (born July 28, 1962) is a former California State Senator for District 37, which includes much of Riverside County in the inland part of Southern California. Prior to serving in the State Senate, Battin served in the California State Assembly from 1994 until 2000. Battin was term limited from the Senate in 2008.

== Early years ==
Battin was born and raised in Billings, Montana. He gained appreciation and respect for nature and the wilderness during his childhood in Montana. Throughout his youth, Jim was an avid sportsman - backpacking, fishing and hunting regularly.

Battin is the son of five-term Congressman and then U.S. District Court Judge James F. Battin. Battin spent some of the early years of his life in Washington, D.C. where he was introduced to politics at a very young age. Battin often played in then-Congressman Gerald Ford's backyard, and Battin knew Bob Dole as one of his father's congressional freshman classmates. When Battin was just six, he accompanied his father to brunch at the White House, where he met President Richard Nixon.

== Education ==
In high school, Battin competed on the school's debate team - ranking third in the state his junior year and winning the state championship his senior year, qualifying him for the national championship, in which he competed.

Battin attended the University of Oregon, where he earned a degree in psychology. In college, he met and later married his wife Mary. They now have three children; Christopher, Bailey, and Kelsey.

== Move to Riverside County and TV ==
The Battins moved to La Quinta in Riverside County in 1985. Battin worked as a television executive for 10 years with KMIR-TV, the NBC television affiliate in Palm Desert. During this time Battin also began his long "career" as a community volunteer, most notably as the driving force behind 'Bringing Home the Holidays', the largest food donation program in the Coachella Valley at the time. He also became a board member of Martha's Kitchen, a meal-distribution program for those in need, and participated in the Youth Education Motivation Program, where business people share with students their "secrets of success in the world of work." Battin also was active in Junior Achievement, working with his wife to instill the entrepreneurial spirit in elementary school children.

== State Assembly ==
Battin was elected to the California State Assembly, District 80, in 1994. He defeated one term incumbent Julie Bornstein who, according to the California Political Almanac, was on the fast track to be Assembly Speaker Willie Brown's successor. He ran on a platform that included government reform and accountability. In 1994, Battin was named Caucus Whip for the new Republican majority in the Assembly. The next year he became the Majority Caucus Chairman, and served within the leadership ranks of his caucus. As Caucus Chair, Battin directed Republican policy strategy, floor operations, managed the caucus and kept members informed about legislation.

As a member of the Assembly, he passed laws to increase penalties for chronic drunk drivers and co-authored historic legislation that is helping steer welfare recipients into full-time jobs, easing county caseloads. He also supported measures to increase the number of computers in California classrooms. AB2219, the "21st Century California Classrooms Act," will create special tax credits for companies who donate computer equipment to public and private schools. Designed to help introduce California students to new skills and the Internet, the bill is similar to federal legislation passed the year before.

== State Senate ==
Battin was elected to the Senate in 2000. In the Senate, Battin served as the Vice-Chair of the Senate Appropriations Committee and as Vice-Chair of the Senate Rules Committee.

Battin's goals were to streamline government regulations and to reduce taxes to improve the competitiveness of California businesses. Throughout his legislative career, Battin fought to defend Proposition 13, support tax cuts for individuals, families and businesses while never voting for higher taxes.

Battin advocated allowing federal-reformulated gasoline into California to reduce gas prices. Battin helped craft a long-term solutions to our energy supply.

Battin worked to improve public safety. In 2004, a 10-year push by Battin come to fruition with the passage of the online sex offender registry database. Battin is also pushing to add other categories of criminals, like child pornographers, to the database. Battin authored legislation to prohibit convicted child molesters from being paroled near elementary schools. He introduced SB 33 to ensure that the state's incest loophole is closed and that family members who molest children are treated under the law the same as other predators.

Battin authored legislation to expand California's class size reduction program into the 7th and 8th grades. Battin also helped bring more resources to Riverside County schools. He helped bring $4 million in ADA "equalization" funds to local schools and $600,000 for a community college library. He even received the "Golden Apple Award" from a local school district for his work on behalf of "small school" funding.

Political offices
Preceded by Julie Bornstein	California State Assemblyman, 80th District; December 5, 1994–November 30, 2000	Succeeded by David G. Kelley
Preceded by David G. Kelley	California State Senator, 37th District; December 4, 2000–November 30, 2008	Succeeded by John J. Benoit
