= Wanda Sankary =

American lawyer and politician (1919–2005)

Member of the California State Assembly from the 79th district
- In office November 2, 1954 – November 6, 1956
- Preceded by: Kathryn Niehouse
- Succeeded by: George G. Crawford

Personal details
- Born: Wanda Kazmarek; December 22, 1919 near Scranton, North Dakota, U.S.
- Died: September 2, 2005 (aged 85) San Diego, California, U.S.
- Party: Democrat
- Spouse(s): Allen Young (m. 1942–1943; death), Morris Sankary (m. 1952–1972; divorce)
- Children: 2
- Occupation: Lawyer, politician
- Other names: Wanda Kazmarek Young Sankary, Wanda Kazmarek Young, Wanda Young Sankary

Wanda Kazmarek Young Sankary (née Wanda Kazmarek; December 22, 1919 – September 2, 2005) was an American lawyer, and politician. She served as a Democratic state legislator in California. Sankary was elected to the California Assembly in 1954 from San Diego. She also went by the name Wanda Y. Sankary.

== Early life and education ==
Wanda Sankary was born with the name Wanda Kazmarek, on December 22, 1919, near Scranton, North Dakota. She was of Polish heritage. She was born and raised in a sod roofed house on the prairie in North Dakota. Her father was a coal miner. Kazmarek attended Woodrow Wilson Jr. High School (now Wilson Middle School), and Herbert Hoover High School in San Diego, California.

She continued her education at San Diego State College, University of California, Berkeley, and graduated from UCLA School of Law (class of 1950).

== Career ==
Sankary was elected to the California Assembly in November 1954 from San Diego (AD-79), winning out over Chester E. Schneider. She succeeded Kathryn Niehouse. She gave birth the night she was elected. She lost her re-election campaign in 1956. She was active in the League of Women Voters for over 20 years.

In 1976, she was appointed by Governor Jerry Brown to the California State Board of Equalization.

== Death and legacy ==
She died on September 2, 2005, in San Diego.

UCLA Library has a collection of her papers. The Regional Oral History Office at the Bancroft Library at the University of California, Berkeley interviewed her in 1977, part of a series on women legislators. It was released as a book with the title, From Sod House to State House in 1979.

She wrote biographical notes of her life history, which is held at San Diego State University.

== Personal life ==
She was married to Allen Young in 1942, and he died six months later in war while serving as a pilot in the United States Navy. She was married to Morris Sankary from 1952 to 1972, and the marriage ended in divorce. She had two sons.

== See also ==
- California's 79th State Assembly district
