= Hale Ashcraft =

American politician

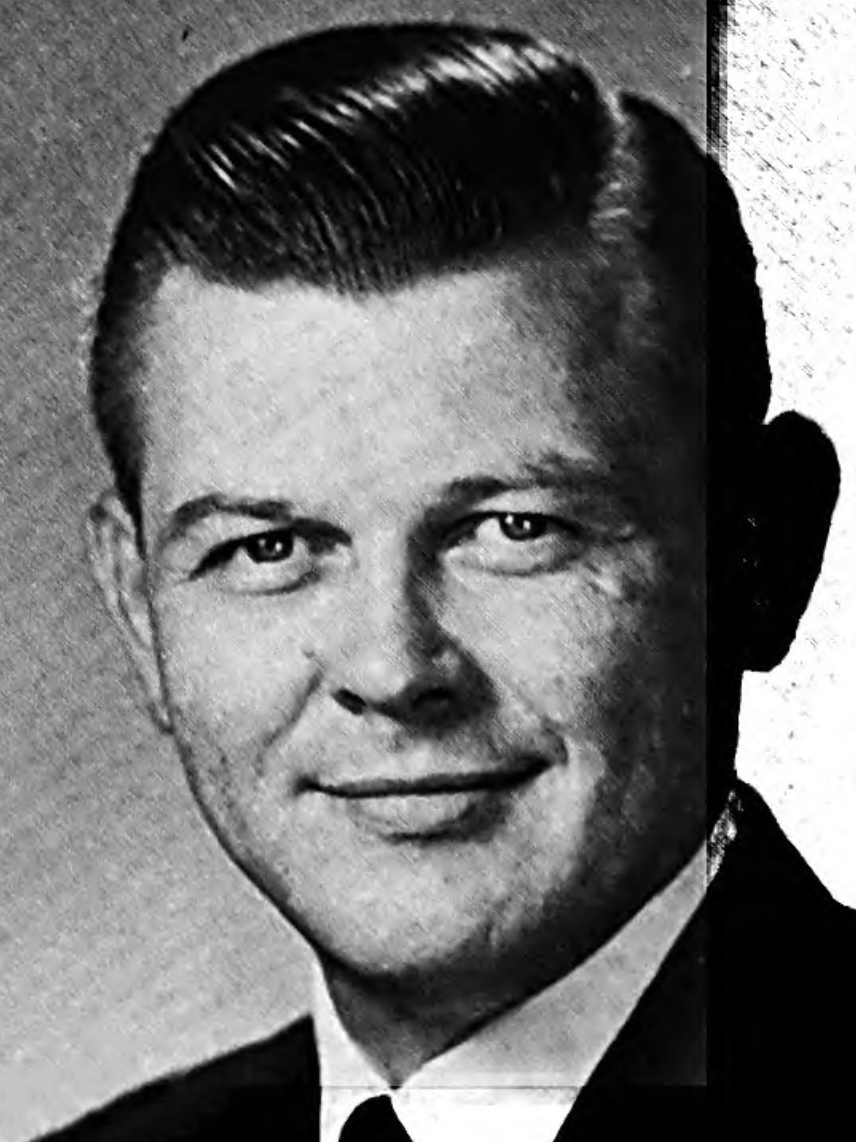

Member of the California State Assembly from the 80th district
- In office January 7, 1963 – January 2, 1967
- Preceded by: Jack Schrade
- Succeeded by: John Stull

Personal details
- Born: March 28, 1920 Portland, Indiana, U.S.
- Died: March 14, 2010 (aged 89) Kalispell, Montana, U.S.
- Party: Republican
- Spouse: Jean Beach (after 1942) Juanita Wentner (after 1970) Jeannine Froman (m. 2009, divorced)
- Children: 7

Military service
- Branch/service: United States Army
- Battles/wars: World War II

Hale Harlan Ashcraft (March 28, 1920 – March 14, 2010) served in the California State Assembly for the 80th district from 1963 to 1967 and during World War II he served in the United States Army.
