= Wadie P. Deddeh =

American politician (1920–2019)

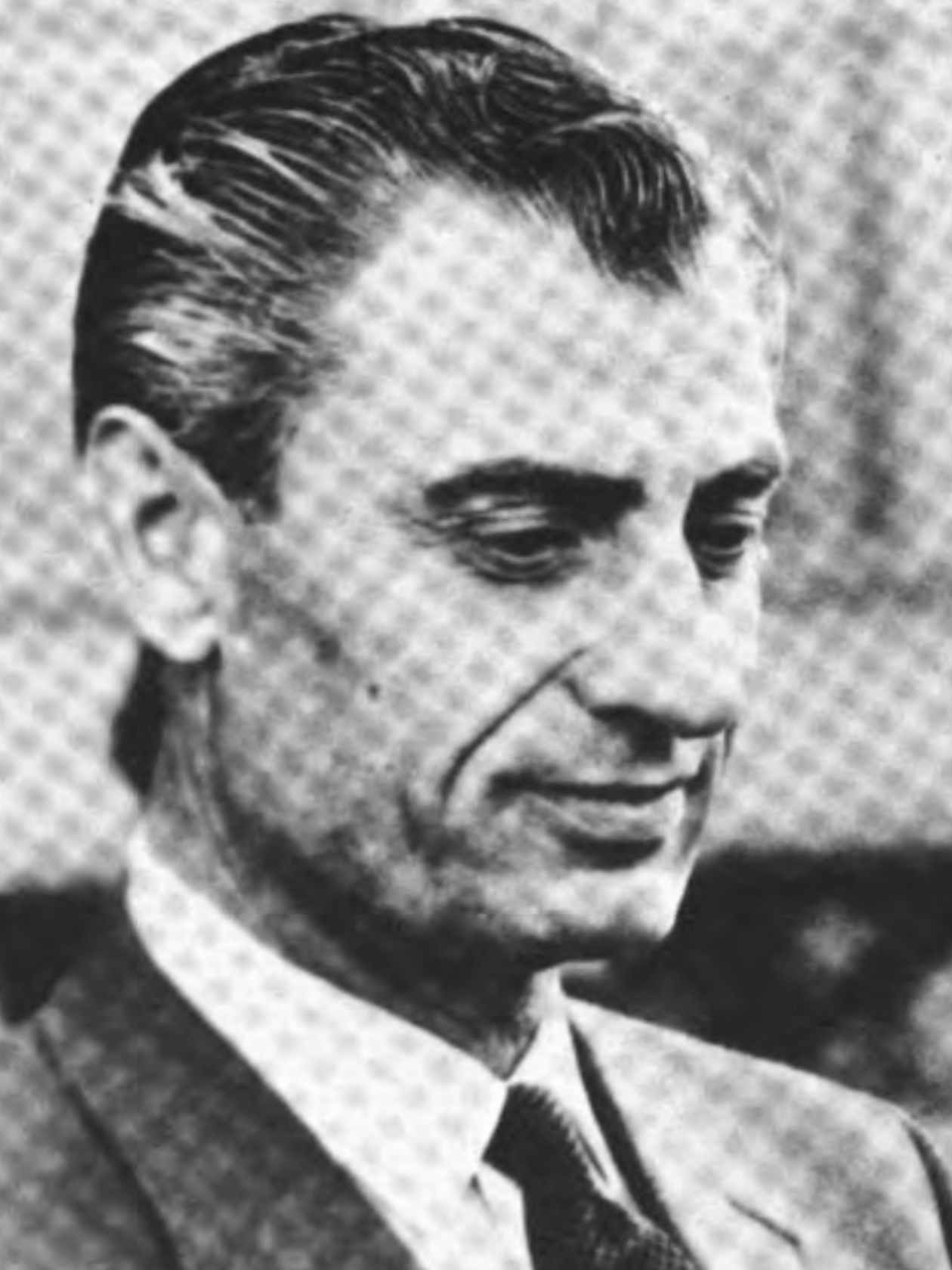
- Official portrait, 1975

Member of the California Senate from the 40th district
- In office December 6, 1982 – August 17, 1993
- Preceded by: James R. Mills
- Succeeded by: Stephen Peace

Member of the California State Assembly from the 80th district
- In office December 2, 1974 – November 30, 1982
- Preceded by: John Stull
- Succeeded by: Stephen Peace

Member of the California State Assembly from the 77th district
- In office January 2, 1967 – November 30, 1974
- Preceded by: Richard J. Donovan
- Succeeded by: Bob Wilson

Personal details
- Born: September 6, 1920 Baghdad, Iraq
- Died: August 27, 2019 (aged 98) San Diego, California, U.S.
- Party: Democratic
- Spouse: Mary-Lynn Drake
- Children: 1
- Education: University of Baghdad; University of Detroit
- Occupation: Political Science Professor

Wadie P. Deddeh (September 6, 1920 – August 27, 2019) was an American politician of Assyrian descent in the state of California. He served in the California State Assembly from 1967 to 1982, and in the California State Senate from 1982 to 1993. He is the first Iraqi-American elected official in the United States. Deddeh wrote the 1972 legislation that created the modern California Department of Transportation, handling the highway functions previously managed by a division of the California Department of Public Works. He died at the age of 98 on August 27, 2019.
