= Mills Act =

The Mills Act is a California state law that allows cities to enter into contracts with the owners of historic structures. Such contracts require a reduction of property taxes in exchange for the continued preservation of the property.

The Mills Act is recognized by the state of California as the "single most important economic development incentive program in California for the restoration and preservation of qualified historic buildings by private property owners." The Mills Act has been credited with saving thousands of historic buildings from destruction in California.

Each local government establishes their own criteria and determines how many contracts they will allow in their jurisdiction.

For example, the City of Pasadena Historic Property Contract Program was established by ordinance in October 2002 under the authority of the Mills Act (California Government Code, Article 12, Sections 50280–50290). Under this act, local governments may enter into historic property contracts with owners of qualifying privately owned historic properties who agree to rehabilitate, restore and/or maintain their property according to the Secretary of Interior Standards.

California's four largest cities (Los Angeles, San Diego, San Francisco, and San Jose) as well as more than 75 other city and county governments have instituted Mills Act programs.

The law is named after its author, James R. Mills who was inspired to write the law when a developer proposed demolishing the historic Hotel del Coronado in his San Diego area district. The law was deemed unconstitutional in 1973, but voters later approved it as a constitutional amendment in 1976.
