= California's 80th State Assembly district =

American legislative district

Current assemblymember
| David Alvarez; D–San Diego |
- Population (2010) • Voting age • Citizen voting age: 464,602; 335,580; 227,429
- Demographics: 14.32% White; 6.46% Black; 67.71% Latino; 9.82% Asian; 0.38% Native American; 0.47% Hawaiian/Pacific Islander; 0.20% other; 0.63% remainder of multiracial
- Registered voters: 233,550
- Registration: 48.86% Democratic; 15.84% Republican; 29.22% No party preference

California's 80th State Assembly district is one of 80 California State Assembly districts. It is currently represented by Democrat David Alvarez of San Diego after winning a special election to succeed Lorena Gonzalez, who resigned on January 5, 2022 to become leader of the California Labor Federation.

== District profile ==
The district encompasses the southern parts of urban San Diego County. It runs up against the Mexican border and takes in the Latino core of the metropolitan area.

San Diego County – 15.0%

- Chula Vista – 63.6%
- National City – 72.9%
- San Diego – 19.9%

== Election results from statewide races ==
| Year | Office | Results |
|---|---|---|
| 2020 | President | Biden 69.3 – 28.4% |
| 2018 | Governor | Newsom 70.0 – 30.0% |
| 2018 | Senator | de Leon 51.1 – 48.9% |
| 2016 | President | Clinton 73.1 – 21.3% |
| 2016 | Senator | Harris 54.1 – 45.9% |
| 2014 | Governor | Brown 66.2 – 33.8% |
| 2012 | President | Obama 69.5 – 28.7% |
| 2012 | Senator | Feinstein 69.9 – 30.1% |

== List of assembly members representing the district ==
Due to redistricting, the 80th district has been moved around different parts of the state. The current iteration resulted from the 2021 redistricting by the California Citizens Redistricting Commission.

| Member | Party | Dates | Electoral history | Counties represented |
|---|---|---|---|---|
| Thomas J. Swayne (National City) | Republican | January 5, 1885 – January 3, 1887 | Elected in 1884. [data missing] | San Diego |
| Nestor A. Young (San Diego) | Republican | January 3, 1887 – January 2, 1893 | Elected in 1886. Re-elected in 1888. Re-elected in 1890. [data missing] | San Diego |
| William M. Casterline (Riverside) | Republican | January 2, 1893 – January 7, 1895 | Elected in 1892. [data missing] | San Diego |
| Alfred Keen (Chula Vista) | Republican | January 7, 1895 – January 4, 1897 | Elected in 1894. [data missing] | San Diego |
| J. L. Dryden (San Diego) | Fusion | January 4, 1897 – January 2, 1899 | Elected in 1896. [data missing] | San Diego |
| A. S. Crowder (La Mesa) | Republican | January 2, 1899 – January 1, 1901 | Elected in 1898. [data missing] | San Diego |
| C. R. Stewart (San Diego) | Republican | January 1, 1901 – January 5, 1903 | Elected in 1900. [data missing] | San Diego |
| John G. Burgess (El Cajon) | Republican | January 5, 1903 – January 2, 1905 | Elected in 1902. [data missing] | San Diego |
| Percy A. Johnson (San Diego) | Republican | January 5, 1905 – January 2, 1911 | Elected in 1904. Re-elected in 1906. Re-elected in 1908. [data missing] | San Diego |
| Percy A. Johnson (San Diego) | Republican | January 5, 1905 – January 2, 1911 | Elected in 1904. Re-elected in 1906. Re-elected in 1908. [data missing] | San Diego, Imperial |
| Fred E. Judson (San Diego) | Republican | January 2, 1911 – January 4, 1915 | Elected in 1910. Re-elected in 1912. Re-elected in 1914. [data missing] | San Diego, Imperial |
| Fred E. Judson (San Diego) | Progressive | January 4, 1915 – January 8, 1917 | Elected in 1910. Re-elected in 1912. Re-elected in 1914. [data missing] | San Diego |
| William A. Doran (San Marcos) | Republican | January 8, 1917 – January 3, 1921 | Elected in 1916. Re-elected in 1918. [data missing] | San Diego |
| Robert W. Colburn (Fallbrook) | Republican | January 3, 1921 – January 8, 1923 | Elected in 1920. [data missing] | San Diego |
| Edwin A. Mueller (El Cajon) | Republican | January 8, 1923 – January 3, 1927 | Elected in 1922. Re-elected in 1924. [data missing] | San Diego |
| Crowell D. Eddy (National City) | Republican | January 3, 1927 – January 5, 1931 | Elected in 1926. Re-elected in 1928. [data missing] | San Diego |
| Arthur R. Honnold (Escondido) | Republican | January 5, 1931 – January 2, 1933 | Elected in 1930. [data missing] | San Diego |
| Charles W. Stream (San Diego) | Republican | January 2, 1933 – January 6, 1947 | Elected in 1932. Re-elected in 1934. Re-elected in 1936. Re-elected in 1938. Re-elected in 1940. Re-elected in 1942. Re-elected in 1944. [data missing] | San Diego |
| Howard K. Cramer (Chula Vista) | Republican | January 6, 1947 – May 28, 1949 | Elected in 1946. Re-elected in 1948. Resigned. | San Diego |
| Vacant | | May 28, 1949 – January 8, 1951 | | San Diego |
| Ralph R. Cloyed (Chula Vista) | Republican | January 8, 1951 – January 3, 1955 | Elected in 1950. Re-elected in 1952. Retired to run for California State Senate. | San Diego |
| Jack Schrade (El Cajon) | Republican | January 3, 1955 – January 7, 1963 | Elected in 1954. Re-elected in 1956. Re-elected in 1958. Re-elected in 1960. Retired to run for California State Senate. | San Diego |
| Hale Ashcraft (Lakeside) | Republican | January 7, 1963 – January 2, 1967 | Elected in 1962. Re-elected in 1964. [data missing] | San Diego |
| John Stull (Escondido) | Republican | January 2, 1967 – March 12, 1973 | Elected in 1966. Re-elected in 1968. Re-elected in 1970. Re-elected in 1972. Resigned to become a California State Senator. | San Diego |
| Vacant | | March 12, 1973 – December 2, 1974 | | San Diego |
| Wadie P. Deddeh (San Diego) | Democratic | December 2, 1974 – November 30, 1982 | Redistricted from the 77th district and re-elected in 1974. Re-elected in 1976. Re-elected in 1978. Re-elected in 1980. Retired to run for California State Senate. | San Diego |
| Stephen Peace (Chula Vista) | Democratic | December 6, 1982 – November 30, 1992 | Elected in 1982. Re-elected in 1984. Re-elected in 1986. Re-elected in 1988. Re-elected in 1990. Redistricted to the 79th district. | San Diego, Imperial |
| Julie Bornstein (Palm Desert) | Democratic | December 7, 1992 – November 30, 1994 | Elected in 1992. Lost re-election. | Imperial, Riverside |
| Jim Battin (La Quinta) | Republican | December 5, 1994 – November 30, 2000 | Elected in 1994. Re-elected in 1996. Re-elected in 1998. Term-limited and ran for California State Senate. | Imperial, Riverside |
| David G. Kelley (Riverside) | Republican | December 4, 2000 – November 30, 2002 | Elected in 2000. Retired. | Imperial, Riverside |
| Bonnie Garcia (Palm Desert) | Republican | December 2, 2002 – November 30, 2008 | Elected in 2002. Re-elected in 2004. Re-elected in 2006. Term-limited and retired. | Imperial, Riverside |
| V. Manuel Perez (Coachella) | Democratic | December 1, 2008 – November 30, 2012 | Elected in 2008. Re-elected in 2010. Redistricted to the 56th district. | Imperial, Riverside |
| Ben Hueso (San Diego) | Democratic | December 3, 2012 – March 21, 2013 | Redistricted from the 79th district and re-elected in 2012. Resigned to become a California State Senator. | San Diego |
| Vacant | | March 21, 2013 – May 28, 2013 | | San Diego |
| Lorena Gonzalez (San Diego) | Democratic | May 28, 2013 – January 5, 2022 | Elected to finish Hueso's term. Re-elected in 2014. Re-elected in 2016. Re-elected in 2018. Resigned. | San Diego |
| Vacant | | January 5, 2022 – June 15, 2022 | | San Diego |
| David Alvarez (San Diego) | Democratic | June 15, 2022 – present | Elected to finish Gonzalez's term. Re-elected in 2022. Re-elected in 2024. | San Diego |

== Election results (1990-present) ==
=== 2024 ===
2024 California State Assembly 80th district election
Primary election
| Party | Candidate | Votes | % |
|---|---|---|---|
| Democratic | David Alvarez (incumbent) | 41,070 | 59.3 |
| Republican | Michael W. Williams | 28,220 | 40.7 |
| Total votes | | 69,290 | 100.0 |
General election
| Democratic | David Alvarez (incumbent) | 113,768 | 61.0 |
| Republican | Michael W. Williams | 72,836 | 39.0 |
| Total votes | | 186,604 | 100.0 |
| Democratic hold | | | |

=== 2022 ===
2022 California State Assembly 80th district election
Primary election
| Party | Candidate | Votes | % |
|---|---|---|---|
| Democratic | Georgette Gómez | 25,308 | 36.4 |
| Democratic | David Alvarez | 21,548 | 31.0 |
| Republican | John Vogel Garcia | 14,162 | 20.3 |
| Republican | Lincoln Pickard | 8,578 | 12.3 |
| Total votes | | 69,596 | 100.0 |
General election
| Democratic | David Alvarez (incumbent) (Note: Candidate was not an incumbent during the primary but was an incumbent in the general election after winning the special election for the seat. The special election was held on the same day as the primary.) | 67,309 | 69.3 |
| Democratic | Georgette Gómez | 29,869 | 30.7 |
| Total votes | | 97,178 | 100.0 |
| Democratic hold | | | |

=== 2022 (special) ===
2022 California State Assembly 80th district special election Vacancy resulting from the resignation of Lorena Gonzalez
Primary election
| Party | Candidate | Votes | % |
|---|---|---|---|
| Democratic | Georgette Gómez | 15,300 | 38.2 |
| Democratic | David Alvarez | 15,132 | 37.8 |
| Republican | Lincoln Pickard | 9,625 | 24.0 |
| Total votes | | 40,353 | 100.0 |
General election
| Democratic | David Alvarez | 26,482 | 54.3 |
| Democratic | Georgette Gómez | 22,297 | 45.7 |
| Total votes | | 48,779 | 100.0 |
| Democratic hold | | | |

=== 2020 ===
2020 California State Assembly 80th district election
Primary election
| Party | Candidate | Votes | % |
|---|---|---|---|
| Democratic | Lorena Gonzalez (incumbent) | 56,872 | 72.7 |
| Republican | John J. Vogel | 13,999 | 17.9 |
| Republican | Lincoln Pickard | 7,334 | 9.4 |
| Total votes | | 78,205 | 100.0 |
General election
| Democratic | Lorena Gonzalez (incumbent) | 121,661 | 71.5 |
| Republican | John J. Vogel | 48,390 | 28.5 |
| Total votes | | 170,051 | 100.0 |
| Democratic hold | | | |

=== 2018 ===
2018 California State Assembly 80th district election
Primary election
| Party | Candidate | Votes | % |
|---|---|---|---|
| Democratic | Lorena Gonzalez (incumbent) | 38,449 | 70.5 |
| Republican | Lincoln Pickard | 16,107 | 29.5 |
| Republican | Joseph Viveiros (write-in) | 3 | 0.0 |
| Total votes | | 54,559 | 100.0 |
General election
| Democratic | Lorena Gonzalez (incumbent) | 82,621 | 75.0 |
| Republican | Lincoln Pickard | 27,563 | 25.0 |
| Total votes | | 110,184 | 100.0 |
| Democratic hold | | | |

=== 2016 ===
2016 California State Assembly 80th district election
Primary election
| Party | Candidate | Votes | % |
|---|---|---|---|
| Democratic | Lorena Gonzalez (incumbent) | 55,150 | 74.6 |
| Republican | Lincoln Pickard | 14,015 | 19.0 |
| No party preference | Louis J. Marinelli | 4,753 | 6.4 |
| Total votes | | 73,918 | 100.0 |
General election
| Democratic | Lorena Gonzalez (incumbent) | 108,655 | 77.8 |
| Republican | Lincoln Pickard | 30,917 | 22.2 |
| Total votes | | 139,572 | 100.0 |
| Democratic hold | | | |

=== 2014 ===
2014 California State Assembly 80th district election
Primary election
| Party | Candidate | Votes | % |
|---|---|---|---|
| Democratic | Lorena Gonzalez (incumbent) | 25,953 | 100.0 |
| Total votes | | 25,953 | 100.0 |
General election
| Democratic | Lorena Gonzalez (incumbent) | 43,362 | 100.0 |
| Total votes | | 43,362 | 100.0 |
| Democratic hold | | | |

=== 2013 (special) ===
2013 California State Assembly 80th district special election Vacancy resulting from the resignation of Ben Hueso
Primary election
| Party | Candidate | Votes | % |
|---|---|---|---|
| Democratic | Lorena Gonzalez | 18,125 | 71.2 |
| Democratic | Steve Castaneda | 6,646 | 26.1 |
| Libertarian | Kaiden Degas (write-in) | 548 | 2.2 |
| Republican | Lincoln Pickard (write-in) | 140 | 0.5 |
| Total votes | | 25,459 | 100.0 |
| Democratic hold | | | |

=== 2012 ===
2012 California State Assembly 80th district election
Primary election
| Party | Candidate | Votes | % |
|---|---|---|---|
| Democratic | Ben Hueso (incumbent) | 26,717 | 61.6 |
| Republican | Derrick W. Roach | 16,623 | 38.4 |
| Total votes | | 43,340 | 100.0 |
General election
| Democratic | Ben Hueso (incumbent) | 76,225 | 69.6 |
| Republican | Derrick W. Roach | 33,260 | 30.4 |
| Total votes | | 109,485 | 100.0 |
| Democratic hold | | | |

=== 2010 ===
2010 California State Assembly 80th district election
| Party | Candidate | Votes | % |
|---|---|---|---|
| Democratic | Manuel Perez (incumbent) | 58,315 | 58.3 |
| Republican | Steve Sanchez | 41,728 | 41.7 |
| Total votes | | 100,043 | 100.0 |
| Democratic hold | | | |

=== 2008 ===
2008 California State Assembly 80th district election
| Party | Candidate | Votes | % |
|---|---|---|---|
| Democratic | Manuel Perez | 70,140 | 52.6 |
| Republican | Gary Jeandron | 63,085 | 47.4 |
| Total votes | | 133,225 | 100.0 |
| Democratic gain from Republican | | | |

=== 2006 ===
2006 California State Assembly 80th district election
| Party | Candidate | Votes | % |
|---|---|---|---|
| Republican | Bonnie Garcia (incumbent) | 42,459 | 51.5 |
| Democratic | Steve Clute | 39,946 | 48.5 |
| Total votes | | 82,405 | 100.0 |
| Republican hold | | | |

=== 2004 ===
2004 California State Assembly 80th district election
| Party | Candidate | Votes | % |
|---|---|---|---|
| Republican | Bonnie Garcia (incumbent) | 66,880 | 58.6 |
| Democratic | Mary Ann Andreas | 47,194 | 41.4 |
| Total votes | | 114,074 | 100.0 |
| Republican hold | | | |

=== 2002 ===
2002 California State Assembly 80th district election
| Party | Candidate | Votes | % |
|---|---|---|---|
| Republican | Bonnie Garcia | 36,254 | 51.8 |
| Democratic | Joey Acuna, Jr. | 33,757 | 48.2 |
| Total votes | | 72,011 | 100.0 |
| Republican hold | | | |

=== 2000 ===
2000 California State Assembly 80th district election
| Party | Candidate | Votes | % |
|---|---|---|---|
| Republican | David G. Kelley (incumbent) | 63,848 | 52.2 |
| Democratic | Joey Acuna, Jr. | 53,849 | 44.0 |
| Libertarian | Susan Marie Weber | 4,728 | 3.9 |
| Total votes | | 122,425 | 100.0 |
| Republican hold | | | |

=== 1998 ===
1998 California State Assembly 80th district election
| Party | Candidate | Votes | % |
|---|---|---|---|
| Republican | Jim Battin (incumbent) | 52,823 | 55.5 |
| Democratic | Joey Acuna, Jr. | 38,892 | 40.8 |
| Libertarian | Susan Marie Weber | 3,504 | 2.7 |
| Total votes | | 95,219 | 100.0 |
| Republican hold | | | |

=== 1996 ===
1996 California State Assembly 80th district election
| Party | Candidate | Votes | % |
|---|---|---|---|
| Republican | Jim Battin (incumbent) | 61,864 | 56.7 |
| Democratic | Steve Clute | 44,480 | 40.8 |
| Natural Law | John R. Borchert | 2,745 | 2.5 |
| Total votes | | 109,089 | 100.0 |
| Republican hold | | | |

=== 1994 ===
1994 California State Assembly 80th district election
| Party | Candidate | Votes | % |
|---|---|---|---|
| Republican | Jim Battin | 53,794 | 56.3 |
| Democratic | Julie Bornstein (incumbent) | 41,671 | 43.7 |
| Total votes | | 95,465 | 100.0 |
| Republican gain from Democratic | | | |

=== 1992 ===
1992 California State Assembly 80th district election
| Party | Candidate | Votes | % |
|---|---|---|---|
| Democratic | Julie Bornstein | 56,760 | 49.6 |
| Republican | Tricia Rae Hunter | 55,971 | 49.0 |
| No party | Philip B. Dreisbach (write-in) | 1,592 | 1.4 |
| Total votes | | 114,323 | 100.0 |
| Democratic hold | | | |

=== 1990 ===
1990 California State Assembly 80th district election
| Party | Candidate | Votes | % |
|---|---|---|---|
| Democratic | Stephen Peace (incumbent) | 36,146 | 57.7 |
| Republican | Kevin B. Kelly | 21,884 | 34.9 |
| American Independent | Lenny Bell | 2,795 | 4.5 |
| Libertarian | Randy Myrseth | 1,865 | 3.0 |
| Total votes | | 62,690 | 100.0 |
| Democratic hold | | | |

== See also ==
- California State Assembly
- California State Assembly districts
- Districts in California
